= 1929 Philadelphia Phillies season =

Major League Baseball season

1929 Philadelphia Phillies
- League: National League
- Ballpark: Baker Bowl
- City: Philadelphia, Pennsylvania
- Owners: William F. Baker
- Managers: Burt Shotton

The following lists the events of the 1929 Philadelphia Phillies season.

== Offseason ==
- December 13, 1928: Heinie Sand and $10,000 were traded by the Phillies to the St. Louis Cardinals for Tommy Thevenow.

== Regular season ==
=== Season standings ===
National League
Team	W	L	Pct.	GB	Home	Road
Chicago Cubs	98	54	.645	—	52‍–‍25	46‍–‍29
Pittsburgh Pirates	88	65	.575	10½	45‍–‍31	43‍–‍34
New York Giants	84	67	.556	13½	39‍–‍37	45‍–‍30
St. Louis Cardinals	78	74	.513	20	43‍–‍32	35‍–‍42
Philadelphia Phillies	71	82	.464	27½	39‍–‍37	32‍–‍45
Brooklyn Robins	70	83	.458	28½	42‍–‍35	28‍–‍48
Cincinnati Reds	66	88	.429	33	38‍–‍39	28‍–‍49
Boston Braves	56	98	.364	43	34‍–‍43	22‍–‍55

=== Record vs. opponents ===
1929 National League record Sources:
Team	BSN	BRO	CHC	CIN	NYG	PHI	PIT	STL
Boston	—	11–11	7–15	8–14	9–13	5–17	8–14	8–14
Brooklyn	11–11	—	6–16	11–11	14–7	9–13	9–13	10–12
Chicago	15–7	16–6	—	14–8–1	12–10–1	17–5–1	9–13	15–5–1
Cincinnati	14–8	11–11	8–14–1	—	10–12	11–11	9–13	3–19
New York	13–9	7–14	10–12–1	12–10	—	16–5	13–8	13–9
Philadelphia	17–5	13–9	5–17–1	11–11	5–16	—	11–11	9–13
Pittsburgh	14–8	13–9	13–9	13–9	8–13	11–11	—	16–6–1
St. Louis	14–8	12–10	5–15–1	19–3	9–13	13–9	6–16–1	—

=== Roster ===
1929 Philadelphia Phillies
Roster
Pitchers: Ray Benge; Phil Collins; Sam Dailey; Hal Elliott; Alex Ferguson; June Greene; Jim Holloway; Lou Koupal; Bob McGraw; Elmer Miller; John Milligan; Luther Roy; Harry Smythe; Les Sweetland; Claude Willoughby	Catchers: Spud Davis; Walt Lerian; George Susce; Infielders: Bernie Friberg; Don Hurst; Terry Lyons; Tommy Thevenow; Fresco Thompson; Pinky Whitney	Outfielders: Chuck Klein; Lefty O'Doul; Homer Peel; Tripp Sigman; Denny Sothern; Cy Williams; Other batters: Joe O'Rourke	Manager: Burt Shotton; Coaches: Fred Hunter

== Player stats ==
= Indicates team leader

= Indicates league leader

=== Batting ===
==== Starters by position ====
Note: Pos = Position; G = Games played; AB = At bats; H = Hits; Avg. = Batting average; HR = Home runs; RBI = Runs batted in

Pos	Player	G	AB	H	Avg.	HR	RBI
C	Walt Lerian	105	273	61	.223	6	25
1B	Don Hurst	154	589	179	.304	31	125
2B	Fresco Thompson	148	623	202	.324	4	53
SS	Tommy Thevenow	90	317	72	.227	0	35
3B	Pinky Whitney	154	612	200	.327	8	115
OF	Chuck Klein	149	616	219	.356	43	145
OF	Lefty O'Doul	154	638	254	.398	32	122
OF	Denny Sothern	76	294	90	.306	5	27

==== Other batters ====
Note: G = Games played; AB = At bats; H = Hits; Avg. = Batting average; HR = Home runs; RBI = Runs batted in

Player	G	AB	H	Avg.	HR	RBI
Bernie Friberg	128	455	137	.301	7	55
Spud Davis	98	263	90	.342	7	48
Homer Peel	53	156	42	.269	0	19
Cy Williams	66	65	19	.292	5	21
Elmer Miller	31	38	9	.237	1	4
Tripp Sigman	10	29	15	.517	2	9
George Susce	17	17	5	.294	1	1
Joe O'Rourke	3	3	0	.000	0	0
Terry Lyons	1	0	0	----	0	0

=== Pitching ===
==== Starting pitchers ====
Note: G = Games pitched; IP = Innings pitched; W = Wins; L = Losses; ERA = Earned run average; SO = Strikeouts

Player	G	IP	W	L	ERA	SO
Claude Willoughby	49	243.1	15	14	4.99	50
Les Sweetland	43	204.1	13	11	5.11	47
Ray Benge	38	199.0	11	14	6.29	78
Lou Koupal	15	86.2	5	5	4.78	18

==== Other pitchers ====
Note: G = Games pitched; IP = Innings pitched; W = Wins; L = Losses; ERA = Earned run average; SO = Strikeouts

Player	G	IP	W	L	ERA	SO
Phil Collins	43	153.1	9	7	5.75	61
Hal Elliott	40	114.1	3	7	6.06	32
Luther Roy	21	88.2	3	7	8.42	16
Harry Smythe	19	68.2	4	6	5.24	12
Sam Dailey	20	51.1	2	2	7.54	18
Alex Ferguson	5	12.2	1	2	12.08	3
Elmer Miller	8	11.1	0	1	11.12	1
John Milligan	8	9.2	0	1	16.76	2

==== Relief pitchers ====
Note: G = Games pitched; W = Wins; L = Losses; SV = Saves; ERA = Earned run average; SO = Strikeouts

Player	G	W	L	SV	ERA	SO
Bob McGraw	41	5	5	4	5.73	22
June Greene	5	0	0	0	19.76	4
Jim Holloway	3	0	0	0	13.50	1
