= 1929 Pittsburgh Pirates season =

1929 Pittsburgh Pirates
- League: National League
- Ballpark: Forbes Field
- City: Pittsburgh, Pennsylvania
- Owners: Barney Dreyfuss
- Managers: Jewel Ens

The 1929 Pittsburgh Pirates season was the 48th season of the Pittsburgh Pirates franchise; the 43rd in the National League. The Pirates finished second in the league standings with a record of 88–65.

== Regular season ==
=== Season standings ===
National League
Team	W	L	Pct.	GB	Home	Road
Chicago Cubs	98	54	.645	—	52‍–‍25	46‍–‍29
Pittsburgh Pirates	88	65	.575	10½	45‍–‍31	43‍–‍34
New York Giants	84	67	.556	13½	39‍–‍37	45‍–‍30
St. Louis Cardinals	78	74	.513	20	43‍–‍32	35‍–‍42
Philadelphia Phillies	71	82	.464	27½	39‍–‍37	32‍–‍45
Brooklyn Robins	70	83	.458	28½	42‍–‍35	28‍–‍48
Cincinnati Reds	66	88	.429	33	38‍–‍39	28‍–‍49
Boston Braves	56	98	.364	43	34‍–‍43	22‍–‍55

=== Record vs. opponents ===
1929 National League record Sources:
Team	BSN	BRO	CHC	CIN	NYG	PHI	PIT	STL
Boston	—	11–11	7–15	8–14	9–13	5–17	8–14	8–14
Brooklyn	11–11	—	6–16	11–11	14–7	9–13	9–13	10–12
Chicago	15–7	16–6	—	14–8–1	12–10–1	17–5–1	9–13	15–5–1
Cincinnati	14–8	11–11	8–14–1	—	10–12	11–11	9–13	3–19
New York	13–9	7–14	10–12–1	12–10	—	16–5	13–8	13–9
Philadelphia	17–5	13–9	5–17–1	11–11	5–16	—	11–11	9–13
Pittsburgh	14–8	13–9	13–9	13–9	8–13	11–11	—	16–6–1
St. Louis	14–8	12–10	5–15–1	19–3	9–13	13–9	6–16–1	—

=== Game log ===
1929 Game Log: 88–65 (Home: 45–31; Away: 43–34)
April: 4–6 (Home: 1–2; Away: 3–4)

#	Date	Opponent	Score	Win	Loss	Save	Attendance	Record
1	April 16	@ Cubs	4–3	**Grimes** (1–0)	Root	—	46,000	1–0
2	April 17	@ Cubs	2–13	Malone	**Kremer** (0–1)	—	—	1–1
3	April 18	@ Cubs	1–11	Blake	**Petty** (0–1)	—	14,000	1–2
4	April 20	@ Reds	5–4	**Grimes** (2–0)	Rixey	—	—	2–2
5	April 22	@ Reds	4–9	Lucas	**Hill** (0–1)	—	—	2–3
6	April 24	Cubs	5–4 (13)	**Swetonic** (1–0)	Horne	—	32,000	3–3
7	April 26	Cubs	6–9	Bush	**Kremer** (0–2)	Cvengros	8,000	3–4
8	April 27	Cubs	7–8	Malone	**Swetonic** (1–1)	Blake	25,000	3–5
9	April 28	@ Cardinals	6–2	**Petty** (1–1)	Alexander	—	—	4–5
10	April 29	@ Cardinals	3–7	Mitchell	**French** (0–1)	—	12,000	4–6

May: 19–8 (Home: 7–3; Away: 12–5)

#	Date	Opponent	Score	Win	Loss	Save	Attendance	Record
11	May 1	@ Cardinals	4–4 (13)			—	—	4–6
12	May 4	@ Braves	3–5	Seibold	**Petty** (1–2)	—	—	4–7
13	May 5	@ Braves	7–2	**Grimes** (3–0)	Smith	—	28,000	5–7
14	May 6	@ Braves	4–3	**Swetonic** (2–1)	Jones	—	—	6–7
15	May 7	@ Giants	3–2 (10)	**French** (1–1)	Benton	—	—	7–7
16	May 8	@ Giants	0–11	Hubbell	**Petty** (1–3)	—	8,000	7–8
17	May 9	@ Giants	4–3	**Grimes** (4–0)	Fitzsimmons	—	7,500	8–8
18	May 10	@ Phillies	13–9	**Brame** (1–0)	Willoughby	**French** (1)	—	9–8
19	May 11	@ Phillies	6–11	Roy	**Hill** (0–2)	—	—	9–9
20	May 13	@ Robins	12–4	**French** (2–1)	Elliott	—	—	10–9
21	May 15	@ Robins	9–4	**Grimes** (5–0)	Clark	—	—	11–9
22	May 16	Cardinals	9–10 (10)	Johnson	**Swetonic** (2–2)	—	—	11–10
23	May 17	Cardinals	6–2	**French** (3–1)	Alexander	—	—	12–10
24	May 18	Cardinals	6–3	**Kremer** (1–2)	Sherdel	—	—	13–10
25	May 19	@ Cubs	4–1	**Grimes** (6–0)	Malone	—	38,000	14–10
26	May 20	@ Cubs	1–6	Bush	**Swetonic** (2–3)	—	—	14–11
27	May 21	@ Cubs	6–8	Horne	**French** (3–2)	Root	—	14–12
28	May 22	Reds	11–2	**Kremer** (2–2)	Ash	—	—	15–12
29	May 23	Reds	6–3	**Grimes** (7–0)	Rixey	—	—	16–12
30	May 25	Reds	6–4	**Brame** (2–0)	Luque	—	—	17–12
31	May 26	@ Cardinals	12–8	**Fussell** (1–0)	Haines	**Grimes** (1)	30,000	18–12
32	May 26	@ Cardinals	7–5	**Kremer** (3–2)	Frankhouse	**Grimes** (2)	30,000	19–12
33	May 27	@ Cardinals	10–1	**Petty** (2–3)	Hallahan	—	—	20–12
34	May 28	@ Cardinals	5–2	**Brame** (3–0)	Mitchell	—	—	21–12
35	May 29	Cubs	7–2	**Swetonic** (3–3)	Malone	**Hill** (1)	5,500	22–12
36	May 30	Cubs	1–5	Nehf	**Kremer** (3–3)	Bush	25,000	22–13
37	May 30	Cubs	4–0	**Grimes** (8–0)	Root	—	30,000	23–13
38	May 31	Phillies	7–10	Willoughby	**Dawson** (0–1)	McGraw	3,500	23–14

June: 17–11 (Home: 10–7; Away: 7–4)

#	Date	Opponent	Score	Win	Loss	Save	Attendance	Record
39	June 1	Phillies	4–9	Benge	**Petty** (2–4)	—	—	23–15
40	June 3	Phillies	14–2	**Grimes** (9–0)	Sweetland	—	—	24–15
41	June 4	Phillies	9–5	**Swetonic** (4–3)	Collins	—	—	25–15
42	June 6	Braves	4–2	**Kremer** (4–3)	Seibold	—	—	26–15
43	June 7	Braves	6–2	**Brame** (4–0)	Brandt	—	—	27–15
44	June 8	Robins	9–2	**Grimes** (10–0)	Clark	—	—	28–15
45	June 9	@ Robins	6–9	Dudley	**Petty** (2–5)	—	20,000	28–16
46	June 10	Robins	6–7	Moore	**Swetonic** (4–4)	Morrison	3,500	28–17
47	June 11	Robins	3–2	**Brame** (5–0)	Dudley	—	—	29–17
48	June 12	Giants	7–6	**Meine** (1–0)	Scott	—	15,000	30–17
49	June 13	Giants	11–7	**Hill** (1–2)	Genewich	**Swetonic** (1)	—	31–17
50	June 14	Giants	2–7	Benton	**Petty** (2–6)	—	10,000	31–18
51	June 15	Giants	15–20 (14)	Mays	**Swetonic** (4–5)	—	22,000	31–19
52	June 16	@ Reds	8–3	**Meine** (2–0)	Luque	—	—	32–19
53	June 16	@ Reds	1–8	Donohue	**Grimes** (10–1)	—	—	32–20
54	June 17	@ Reds	2–1	**Kremer** (5–3)	May	—	—	33–20
55	June 18	@ Reds	1–2	Lucas	**Brame** (5–1)	—	—	33–21
56	June 19	@ Reds	6–5	**Hill** (2–2)	Rixey	—	—	34–21
57	June 21	@ Cubs	14–3	**Grimes** (11–1)	Cvengros	—	35,000	35–21
58	June 22	@ Cubs	7–4	**Kremer** (6–3)	Blake	—	25,000	36–21
59	June 23	@ Cubs	8–7	**Swetonic** (5–5)	Nehf	—	—	37–21
60	June 24	@ Cubs	3–4	Root	**Brame** (5–2)	—	7,000	37–22
61	June 26	Reds	4–6	Luque	**Kremer** (6–4)	—	—	37–23
62	June 27	Reds	5–3	**Meine** (3–0)	May	—	—	38–23
63	June 28	Reds	3–10	Lucas	**Brame** (5–3)	—	—	38–24
64	June 29	Reds	3–0	**Grimes** (12–1)	Donohue	—	—	39–24
65	June 29	Reds	2–3	Kolp	**Swetonic** (5–6)	—	—	39–25
66	June 30	@ Reds	7–6	**Kremer** (7–4)	Luque	**Meine** (1)	—	40–25

July: 18–11 (Home: 7–7; Away: 11–4)

#	Date	Opponent	Score	Win	Loss	Save	Attendance	Record
67	July 2	Cardinals	5–3	**Brame** (6–3)	Mitchell	—	—	41–25
68	July 3	Cardinals	13–2	**Grimes** (13–1)	Sherdel	—	—	42–25
69	July 4	Cardinals	8–4	**Meine** (4–0)	Johnson	—	20,000	43–25
70	July 4	Cardinals	8–2	**Kremer** (8–4)	Haid	—	43,000	44–25
71	July 6	Reds	3–5	Kolp	**Swetonic** (5–7)	May	—	44–26
72	July 7	@ Robins	17–6	**Brame** (7–3)	Dudley	**Fussell** (1)	19,000	45–26
73	July 8	@ Robins	8–4	**Grimes** (14–1)	Morrison	—	—	46–26
74	July 9	@ Robins	3–1	**Kremer** (9–4)	Dudley	—	—	47–26
75	July 10	@ Phillies	15–9	**Fussell** (2–0)	Benge	**Hill** (2)	—	48–26
76	July 11	@ Phillies	6–2	**Brame** (8–3)	Roy	—	—	49–26
77	July 12	@ Phillies	6–4	**Grimes** (15–1)	Sweetland	—	—	50–26
78	July 13	@ Phillies	10–2	**Kremer** (10–4)	Dailey	—	—	51–26
79	July 15	@ Braves	5–4 (11)	**Meine** (5–0)	Brandt	—	—	52–26
80	July 16	@ Braves	1–4	Smith	**Brame** (8–4)	—	—	52–27
81	July 17	@ Braves	4–7	Seibold	**Grimes** (15–2)	—	—	52–28
82	July 17	@ Braves	13–5	**Kremer** (11–4)	Leverett	—	—	53–28
83	July 18	@ Giants	1–4	Hubbell	**Brame** (8–5)	—	—	53–29
84	July 20	@ Giants	5–2	**Grimes** (16–2)	Walker	**Swetonic** (2)	—	54–29
85	July 20	@ Giants	4–8	Mays	**Meine** (5–1)	—	—	54–30
86	July 21	@ Giants	5–3	**Kremer** (12–4)	Benton	—	—	55–30
87	July 22	Robins	13–3	**Brame** (9–5)	Moore	—	10,000	56–30
88	July 23	Robins	7–10	Morrison	**Fussell** (2–1)	—	—	56–31
89	July 24	Robins	4–6	Clark	**Meine** (5–2)	—	—	56–32
90	July 26	Braves	9–8	**Petty** (3–6)	Smith	—	—	57–32
91	July 27	Braves	3–10	Seibold	**French** (3–3)	—	—	57–33
92	July 27	Braves	5–2	**Brame** (10–5)	Smith	—	—	58–33
93	July 29	Braves	9–10	Jones	**Meine** (5–3)	Cantwell	2,500	58–34
94	July 30	Phillies	5–13	Willoughby	**Kremer** (12–5)	—	—	58–35
95	July 31	Phillies	2–6	Koupal	**Brame** (10–6)	—	3,000	58–36

August: 13–16 (Home: 8–4; Away: 5–12)

#	Date	Opponent	Score	Win	Loss	Save	Attendance	Record
96	August 1	Phillies	3–1	**Petty** (4–6)	Elliott	—	3,000	59–36
97	August 2	Phillies	0–2	Sweetland	**French** (3–4)	—	—	59–37
98	August 5	Giants	10–11	Hubbell	**Brame** (10–7)	Benton	—	59–38
99	August 6	Giants	3–5	Walker	**Petty** (4–7)	—	—	59–39
100	August 7	Giants	4–3	**Kremer** (13–5)	Henry	—	—	60–39
101	August 8	Cardinals	5–1	**Brame** (11–7)	Alexander	—	—	61–39
102	August 9	Cardinals	7–6	**Swetonic** (6–7)	Johnson	—	5,000	62–39
103	August 10	@ Robins	6–4	**Petty** (5–7)	Clark	**Hill** (3)	—	63–39
104	August 10	@ Robins	3–6	Vance	**Meine** (5–4)	—	20,000	63–40
105	August 11	@ Robins	3–5	Moss	**Kremer** (13–6)	Morrison	9,000	63–41
106	August 12	@ Robins	2–4 (10)	Morrison	**Hill** (2–3)	—	—	63–42
107	August 14	@ Braves	1–0	**Petty** (6–7)	Jones	—	—	64–42
108	August 15	@ Braves	1–2	Brandt	**Kremer** (13–7)	—	—	64–43
109	August 16	@ Braves	9–3	**Brame** (12–7)	Seibold	—	—	65–43
110	August 17	@ Braves	3–2	**French** (4–4)	Smith	**Swetonic** (3)	—	66–43
111	August 19	@ Phillies	6–7	Smythe	**Swetonic** (6–8)	—	—	66–44
112	August 19	@ Phillies	5–8	McGraw	**Kremer** (13–8)	Smythe	—	66–45
113	August 20	@ Phillies	6–8	Koupal	**Brame** (12–8)	Willoughby	—	66–46
114	August 21	@ Phillies	8–10	Collins	**Swetonic** (6–9)	Smythe	—	66–47
115	August 22	@ Giants	6–2	**Petty** (7–7)	Henry	—	—	67–47
116	August 24	@ Giants	8–14	Fitzsimmons	**Fussell** (2–2)	—	—	67–48
117	August 24	@ Giants	6–7	Hubbell	**Grimes** (16–3)	—	—	67–49
118	August 25	@ Giants	5–10	Benton	**Petty** (7–8)	—	20,000	67–50
119	August 27	@ Phillies	4–7	Smythe	**Brame** (12–9)	—	—	67–51
120	August 28	Cubs	10–3	**Grimes** (17–3)	Malone	—	—	68–51
121	August 28	Cubs	7–6	**Kremer** (14–8)	Cvengros	**Swetonic** (4)	20,000	69–51
122	August 29	Cubs	5–4	**Petty** (8–8)	Carlson	—	—	70–51
123	August 30	Cubs	15–0	**Meine** (6–4)	Bush	—	—	71–51
124	August 31	Cubs	6–7	Malone	**Grimes** (17–4)	Bush	—	71–52

September: 15–12 (Home: 11–7; Away: 4–5)

#	Date	Opponent	Score	Win	Loss	Save	Attendance	Record
125	September 1	@ Reds	9–7 (12)	**Kremer** (15–8)	Lucas	—	—	72–52
126	September 2	Reds	5–7	May	**Petty** (8–9)	—	8,500	72–53
127	September 2	Reds	9–8 (13)	**Swetonic** (7–9)	Kolp	—	12,000	73–53
128	September 4	@ Reds	4–5	Kolp	**Meine** (6–5)	—	1,148	73–54
129	September 5	@ Reds	10–5	**Brame** (13–9)	Lucas	—	—	74–54
130	September 6	Robins	5–6	Clark	**Grimes** (17–5)	Morrison	—	74–55
131	September 6	Robins	8–1	**Petty** (9–9)	Moss	—	4,000	75–55
132	September 7	Robins	6–2	**Kremer** (16–8)	Dudley	—	—	76–55
133	September 8	@ Robins	1–2	Vance	**French** (4–5)	—	10,000	76–56
134	September 9	Robins	9–7	**Brame** (14–9)	Moore	—	—	77–56
135	September 10	Robins	7–6	**French** (5–5)	Morrison	—	—	78–56
136	September 11	Giants	1–2	Walker	**Grimes** (17–6)	—	—	78–57
137	September 11	Giants	5–10	Mays	**Swetonic** (7–10)	—	—	78–58
138	September 12	Giants	5–8	Fitzsimmons	**Kremer** (16–9)	—	—	78–59
139	September 16	Phillies	3–2 (10)	**Petty** (10–9)	Sweetland	—	—	79–59
140	September 16	Phillies	5–2	**Brame** (15–9)	Smythe	—	—	80–59
141	September 17	Phillies	11–7	**French** (6–5)	Smythe	**Swetonic** (5)	—	81–59
142	September 18	Braves	4–5	Brandt	**Kremer** (16–10)	—	—	81–60
143	September 18	Braves	5–2	**Meine** (7–5)	Jones	—	—	82–60
144	September 19	Braves	3–6	Seibold	**Grimes** (17–7)	Cooney	—	82–61
145	September 20	Braves	10–3	**Petty** (11–9)	Peery	—	—	83–61
146	September 21	Braves	4–0	**Brame** (16–9)	Smith	—	—	84–61
147	September 26	@ Cardinals	1–2	Haid	**Petty** (11–10)	—	—	84–62
148	September 27	@ Cardinals	2–4	Frankhouse	**Brame** (16–10)	Johnson	—	84–63
149	September 28	@ Cardinals	8–5	**Swetonic** (8–10)	Sherdel	—	—	85–63
150	September 29	@ Cardinals	5–1	**Kremer** (17–10)	Grabowski	—	—	86–63
151	September 29	@ Cardinals	2–10	Hallahan	**Meine** (7–6)	—	—	86–64

October: 2–1 (Home: 1–1; Away: 1–0)

#	Date	Opponent	Score	Win	Loss	Save	Attendance	Record
152	October 5	Cardinals	1–3	Hallahan	**Brame** (16–11)	—	—	86–65
153	October 5	Cardinals	8–7	**Kremer** (18–10)	Johnson	—	—	87–65
154	October 6	@ Cubs	8–3	**French** (7–5)	Grampp	—	30,000	88–65

Legend: = Win = Loss = Tie
Bold = Pirates team member

=== Roster ===
1929 Pittsburgh Pirates
**Roster**
**Pitchers**: Erv Brame; Leon Chagnon; Joe Dawson; Ralph Erickson; Larry French; Fred Fussell; Burleigh Grimes; Carmen Hill; Ray Kremer; Lee Meadows; Heinie Meine; Jesse Petty; Steve Swetonic	**Catchers**: Charlie Hargreaves; Rollie Hemsley; Bob Linton; John O'Connell; **Infielders**: Sparky Adams; Dick Bartell; Stu Clarke; George Grantham; Cobe Jones; Harry Riconda; Ben Sankey; Earl Sheely; Jim Stroner; Pie Traynor; Bill Windle	**Outfielders**: Fred Brickell; Adam Comorosky; Ira Flagstead; Jim Mosolf; Lloyd Waner; Paul Waner; **Other batters**: Mel Ingram	**Manager**: Jewel Ens

== Player stats ==
=== Batting ===
==== Starters by position ====
Note: Pos = Position; G = Games played; AB = At bats; H = Hits; Avg. = Batting average; HR = Home runs; RBI = Runs batted in

Pos	Player	G	AB	H	Avg.	HR	RBI
C	Charlie Hargreaves	102	328	88	.268	1	44
1B	Earl Sheely	139	485	142	.293	6	88
2B	George Grantham	110	349	107	.307	12	90
SS	Dick Bartell	143	610	184	.302	2	57
3B	Pie Traynor	130	540	192	.356	4	108
OF	Lloyd Waner	151	662	234	.353	5	74
OF	Paul Waner	151	596	200	.336	15	100
OF	Adam Comorosky	127	473	152	.321	6	97

==== Other batters ====
Note: G = Games played; AB = At bats; H = Hits; Avg. = Batting average; HR = Home runs; RBI = Runs batted in

Player	G	AB	H	Avg.	HR	RBI
Rollie Hemsley	88	235	68	.289	0	37
Sparky Adams	74	196	51	.260	0	11
Stu Clarke	57	178	47	.264	2	21
Fred Brickell	60	118	37	.314	0	17
Cobe Jones	25	63	16	.254	0	4
Ira Flagstead	26	50	14	.280	0	6
Bob Linton	17	18	2	.111	0	1
Harry Riconda	8	15	7	.467	0	2
Jim Mosolf	8	13	6	.462	0	2
Jim Stroner	6	8	3	.375	0	0
Ben Sankey	2	7	1	.143	0	0
John O'Connell	2	7	1	.143	0	0
Bill Windle	2	1	0	.000	0	0
Mel Ingram	3	0	0	----	0	0

=== Pitching ===
==== Starting pitchers ====
Note: G = Games pitched; IP = Innings pitched; W = Wins; L = Losses; ERA = Earned run average; SO = Strikeouts

Player	G	IP	W	L	ERA	SO
Burleigh Grimes	33	232.2	17	7	3.13	62
Erv Brame	37	229.2	16	11	4.55	68
Ray Kremer	34	221.2	18	10	4.26	66
Leon Chagnon	1	7.0	0	0	9.00	4

==== Other pitchers ====
Note: G = Games pitched; IP = Innings pitched; W = Wins; L = Losses; ERA = Earned run average; SO = Strikeouts

Player	G	IP	W	L	ERA	SO
Jesse Petty	36	184.1	11	10	3.71	58
Steve Swetonic	41	143.2	8	10	4.82	35
Larry French	30	123.0	7	5	4.90	49
Heinie Meine	22	108.0	7	6	4.50	19
Carmen Hill	27	79.0	2	3	3.99	28
Fred Fussell	21	39.2	2	2	8.62	18

==== Relief pitchers ====
Note: G = Games pitched; W = Wins; L = Losses; SV = Saves; ERA = Earned run average; SO = Strikeouts

Player	G	W	L	SV	ERA	SO
Joe Dawson	4	0	1	0	8.31	2
Ralph Erickson	1	0	0	0	27.00	0
Lee Meadows	1	0	0	0	13.50	0
