= 1929 in baseball =

The following are the baseball events of the year 1929 throughout the world.

== Champions ==
- World Series: Philadelphia Athletics over Chicago Cubs (4–1)

== Awards and honors ==
- League Award
  - Rogers Hornsby, Chicago Cubs, 2B

== Statistical leaders ==
	American League		National League		American Negro League		Negro National League	
Stat	Player	Total	Player	Total	Player	Total	Player	Total
AVG	Lew Fonseca (CLE)	.369	Lefty O'Doul (PHI)	.398	Chino Smith (NYL)	.451	Turkey Stearnes (DTS)	.390
HR	Babe Ruth (NYY)	46	Chuck Klein (PHI)	43	Chino Smith (NYL)	22	Willie Wells (CAG/SLS)	26
RBI	Al Simmons (PHA)	157	Hack Wilson (CHC)	159	Rap Dixon (BBS)	92	Willie Wells (CAG/SLS)	128
W	George Earnshaw (PHA)	24	Pat Malone (CHC)	22	Connie Rector (NYL)	18	John Williams (SLS)	19
ERA	Lefty Grove (PHA)	2.81	Bill Walker (NYG)	3.09	Joe Strong (HIL)	2.71	Chet Brewer (KCM)	1.93
K	Lefty Grove (PHA)	170	Pat Malone (CHC)	166	Laymon Yokely (BBS)	97	Satchel Paige (BBB)	189

== Major league baseball final standings ==
=== American League final standings ===
American League
Team	W	L	Pct.	GB	Home	Road
Philadelphia Athletics	104	46	.693	—	57‍–‍16	47‍–‍30
New York Yankees	88	66	.571	18	49‍–‍28	39‍–‍38
Cleveland Indians	81	71	.533	24	44‍–‍32	37‍–‍39
St. Louis Browns	79	73	.520	26	41‍–‍36	38‍–‍37
Washington Senators	71	81	.467	34	37‍–‍40	34‍–‍41
Detroit Tigers	70	84	.455	36	38‍–‍39	32‍–‍45
Chicago White Sox	59	93	.388	46	35‍–‍41	24‍–‍52
Boston Red Sox	58	96	.377	48	32‍–‍45	26‍–‍51

Locations of teams for the 1923–1931 American League seasons
American League

=== National League final standings ===
National League
Team	W	L	Pct.	GB	Home	Road
Chicago Cubs	98	54	.645	—	52‍–‍25	46‍–‍29
Pittsburgh Pirates	88	65	.575	10½	45‍–‍31	43‍–‍34
New York Giants	84	67	.556	13½	39‍–‍37	45‍–‍30
St. Louis Cardinals	78	74	.513	20	43‍–‍32	35‍–‍42
Philadelphia Phillies	71	82	.464	27½	39‍–‍37	32‍–‍45
Brooklyn Robins	70	83	.458	28½	42‍–‍35	28‍–‍48
Cincinnati Reds	66	88	.429	33	38‍–‍39	28‍–‍49
Boston Braves	56	98	.364	43	34‍–‍43	22‍–‍55

Locations of teams for the 1920–1931 National League seasons
National League

== Negro leagues final standings ==
All Negro leagues standings below are per MLB and Seamheads.

=== American Negro League final standings ===
Baltimore was awarded the Pennant as they reportedly won both halves of the season.

vs. American Negro League						vs. Major Black teams			
American Negro League	W	L	T	Pct.	GB	W	L	T	Pct.
Baltimore Black Sox	49	21	0	.700	—	61	28	0	.685
New York Lincoln Giants	40	26	2	.603	8	45	28	2	.613
Homestead Grays	34	29	3	.538	11½	34	34	3	.500
Hilldale Club	40	35	3	.532	11½	44	36	4	.548
Atlantic City Bacharach Giants	19	45	2	.303	27	20	51	2	.288
Cuban Stars (East)	15	41	2	.276	27	16	43	2	.279

Locations of teams for the 1929 American Negro League season
American Negro League

=== Negro National League final standings ===
This was the fifth split-season, in which a playoff was intended to be held to determine the pennant, for which the first half leader would be matched against the second half winner. Kansas City won both halves of the season, so were automatically awarded their fourth pennant.

vs. Negro National League						vs. Major Black teams			
Negro National League	W	L	T	Pct.	GB	W	L	T	Pct.
Kansas City Monarchs	62	17	0	.785	—	65	17	0	.793
St. Louis Stars	56	31	1	.642	10	64	41	2	.607
Chicago American Giants	48	38	0	.558	17½	62	42	0	.596
Detroit Stars	32	37	0	.464	25	43	45	0	.489
Birmingham Black Barons	32	57	0	.360	35	35	59	1	.374
Memphis Red Sox	21	51	1	.295	37½	25	59	3	.305
Cuban Stars (West)	13	33	0	.308	32½	19	40	1	.325

Locations of teams for the 1929 Negro National League season
Negro National League
Traveling team: Cuban Stars (West)

=== Independent teams final standings ===
A loose confederation of teams existed that were not part of either established leagues.

vs. All Teams
Independent Clubs	W	L	T	Pct.	GB
NNL All Stars	2	1	0	.667	—
Stars of Cuba	2	1	0	.667	—
Brooklyn Royal Giants	3	4	0	.429	1
Nashville Elite Giants	14	23	4	.390	5
Danny McClellan's All Stars	0	2	0	.000	1½

== Events ==
=== January–April ===
- January 22 – The New York Yankees announce they will put numbers on the backs of their uniforms, becoming the first baseball team to start continuous use of the numbers. The first numbers are based on positions in the batting order; thus, Babe Ruth will wear number 3 and Lou Gehrig number 4. In a few weeks, the Cleveland Indians announce that they, too, will put numbers on the uniforms. By 1931, all American League teams will use them. It will be 1933 before all National League players are numbered.
- January 29 – James R. Price, secretary of the Boston Red Sox, commits suicide at Fenway Park.
- February 28 – The Chicago White Sox trade Bibb Falk to the Cleveland Indians for Chick Autry.
- April 16:
  - On opening day, Hall of Famer Earl Averill makes his major league debut in the Cleveland Indians' 5–4 eleven inning victory over the Detroit Tigers. The St. Louis Browns defeat the Chicago White Sox, 3–1; the Pittsburgh Pirates defeat the Chicago Cubs, 4–3, and the St. Louis Cardinals defeat the Cincinnati Reds 5–2.
  - Charlie Gelbert makes his MLB debut for the St. Louis Cardinals.
- April 17 – The Detroit Tigers rout the Cleveland Indians 15–3. Tigers outfielder Harry Heilmann drove in five runs.
- April 18:
  - The Cincinnati Reds trade Val Picinich to the Brooklyn Robins for Rube Ehrhardt and Johnny Gooch.
  - Roy Johnson makes his MLB debut for the Detroit Tigers. Johnson lead the league in doubles with 45 in his rookie season.
- April 19 – Hall of famer Rick Ferrell makes his major league debut in the St. Louis Browns' 5–4 loss to the Chicago White Sox.
- April 27 – Brooklyn Robins relief pitcher Clise Dudley is the first player ever to hit a home run off the first pitch he sees. Regardless of the achievement, Brooklyn loses 8–3 to the Philadelphia Phillies.

=== May–August ===
- May 1
  - The Philadelphia Athletics defeat the Boston Red Sox 24–6 at Fenway Park. The 24 runs matches a franchise record, and the 29 hits set another franchise mark.
  - Both games in the National League (the Chicago Cubs in Cincinnati and the Pittsburgh Pirates in St. Louis) are called 4–4 ties after thirteen innings.
- May 4 – The Chicago Cubs faced the Philadelphia Phillies in a double header. The Cubs swept the double header by a combined score of 25–7. Cubs beat the Phillies 16–0 in the first game, and beat them 9–7 in the nightcap. Neither starter Alex Ferguson, game one or Claude Willoughby, game two, made it to the third inning.
- May 8:
  - Carl Hubbell pitches a no-hitter for the New York Giants in an 11–0 victory over the Pittsburgh Pirates.
  - In an 8–1 victory over the St. Louis Browns, Lou Gehrig, Leo Durocher and Tony Lazzeri combined for a double play. Both Gehrig and Lazzeri would be part of another double play in that game, this time with pitcher Waite Hoyt.
- May 13 – At League Park, the Cleveland Indians defeat the New York Yankees, 4–3, in the first game played in Major League history in which players from both teams wear uniform numbers on the back of their jerseys.
- May 24 – The Detroit Tigers defeat the Chicago White Sox 6–5 in 21 innings. Winning pitcher George Uhle pitches twenty innings to earn his eighth win of the season with no losses. The losing pitcher is Ted Lyons, who pitched all 21 innings for Chicago.
- June 20 – Red Badgro, who had been playing professional football since 1927, makes his major league debut as an outfielder with the St. Louis Browns. Despite modest baseball stats (two home runs, 45 runs batted in and a .257 batting average over two seasons with the Browns), Badgro has a nine-year football career that lands him in the Pro Football Hall of Fame in 1981.
- June 29 - The Brooklyn Robins claimed pitcher Kent Greenfield off waivers from the Boston Braves.
- July 3 – Nine double plays are turned in the Chicago Cubs' 7–5 victory over the Cincinnati Reds.
  - The Pittsburgh Pirates released pitcher Lee Meadows.
- July 6 – After losing 10–6 in the opener of a double header against the Philadelphia Phillies, the St. Louis Cardinals score ten runs in the first inning on their way to a 28–6 victory in the second game. The two teams combine to collect a record 73 hits in a double header.
- July 7 Brooklyn Robins starting pitcher Clise Dudley surrenders seven runs in 1.1 innings in a 17–6 loss to the Pittsburgh Pirates.
- July 24 – With a win over the New York Giants and a 6–4 loss by the Pittsburgh Pirates at the hands of the Brooklyn Robins, the Cubs claim sole possession of first place in the National League by half a game. They hold first place the remainder of the season.
- August 11 – Babe Ruth hit his 500th career home run in the second inning off Willis Hudlin at Cleveland's League Park. The homer was Ruth's 30th of the year, but it wasn't enough as the Indians beat the Yankees, 6–5.
- August 17 – The New York Yankees purchase Lefty Gomez's contract from San Francisco of the Pacific Coast League.

=== September–December ===
- September 1 – The Detroit Tigers signed Hank Greenberg as a free agent. Exact date the team signed him is unknown.
- September 21 – Connie Mack's Philadelphia Athletics win their 100th game of the season, 10–7, over the Detroit Tigers.
- October 5 – The Philadelphia Phillies' Lefty O'Doul goes six-for-nine in a double header with the New York Giants on the last day of the season for the Phillies, ending the season with a .398 batting average.
- October 6 - Johnny Evers appears in his final game as a defensive replacement for the Boston Braves in their 9–4 loss to the New York Giants. Evers replaces Freddie Maguire who shifted from second to shortstop to replace Gene Robertson.
- October 7 – The Brooklyn Robins select pitcher Sloppy Thurston from San Francisco Seals of the Pacific Coast League as part of the rule 5 draft.
- October 8 – Howard Ehmke, who was in the twilight of his career, and had made only eleven appearances for the Philadelphia Athletics during the regular season, is handed the ball for the first game of the 1929 World Series. He gives up just one unearned run in the ninth inning to lead the A's to a 3–1 victory over the Chicago Cubs.
- October 9 – Jimmie Foxx has a pair of home runs to lead the A's to a 9–3 victory in game two of the World Series.
- October 10 – Hall of fame outfielder Max Carey retires after he is released by the Brooklyn Robins.
- October 11 – Philadelphia Athletics game two starting pitcher George Earnshaw is the starter in game three of the World Series as well, and pitches all nine innings. The Cubs win their only game of the World Series, 3–1.
- October 12 – Behind 8–0, the Philadelphia Athletics explode for ten runs in the seventh inning to win game four of the World Series, 10–8. Mule Haas has a three-run inside-the-park home run during the inning.
- October 14 – Down 2–0 with one out in the ninth inning, the A's score three runs to claim their first World Championship since 1913. Bing Miller delivers the World Series winning hit.
- October 18 – The Cincinnati Reds purchase the contract of outfielder Bob Meusel from the New York Yankees.
- October 22 - Walt Lerian, the starting catcher for the Philadelphia Phillies, is leaving mass at St. Martin's Catholic Church in Baltimore, Maryland, when he is struck and pinned against a wall by a runaway truck. It takes several hours to free Lerian, and he dies from his injuries.
- December 11 – The St. Louis Browns trade Wally Schang to the Philadelphia Athletics for Sammy Hale.

== Births ==
=== January ===
- January 2 – Ed Wolfe
- January 4 – Corky Valentine
- January 9 – Lottie Beck
- January 11 – Don Mossi
- January 13 – Moe Savransky
- January 17 – Eilaine Roth
- January 20 – Gale Wade
- January 27:
  - Bobby Kline
  - Samuel Taylor
- January 30 – Bill Abernathie
- January 31 – Duke Maas

=== February ===
- February 5 – Al Worthington
- February 11 – Ralph Beard
- February 16 – Fred Hahn
- February 18 – Cal Neeman
- February 22:
  - Ryne Duren
  - Charlie Peete
- February 23 – Elston Howard
- February 26 – Dorice Reid
- February 28 – Ed Albrecht

=== March ===
- March 7 – Red Wilson
- March 10 – Bud Thomas
- March 21 – Pidge Browne
- March 27 – Milt Smith
- March 28 – Bill Macdonald

=== April ===
- April 1 – Mary Ellen Kimball
- April 3 – Art Ditmar
- April 4 – Tookie Gilbert
- April 6 – Don Elston
- April 9 – Hank Morgenweck
- April 12 – Mel Held
- April 16 – Ed Winceniak
- April 18 – Steve Kraly
- April 20 – Harry Agganis
- April 21 – Charles 'Buzz' Bowers
- April 26 – Walt Kellner
- April 29:
  - Mickey McDermott
  - Steve Ridzik

=== May ===
- May 3 – Helen Walulik
- May 7 – Dick Williams
- May 18 – Jack Sanford
- May 19 – Curt Simmons
- May 23 – Spider Wilhelm
- May 27 – George O'Donnell
- May 29:
  - Velma Abbott
  - Roberto Vargas

=== June ===
- June 2:
  - Louise Erickson
  - René Valdés
- June 8 – Jerry Dahlke
- June 10 – Hank Foiles
- June 11 – Frank Thomas
- June 13 – Bud Swartz
- June 14 – Lillian Shadic
- June 18 – Bill Upton
- June 19 – Don Ferrarese
- June 20 – Wally Burnette
- June 26 – Dick Tettelbach
- June 27 – Dick Marlowe

=== July ===
- July 2 – Chuck Stobbs
- July 4:
  - Bill Tremel
  - Bill Tuttle
- July 6 – Angelo LiPetri
- July 7 – John Romonosky
- July 8 – John Powers
- July 9:
  - Héctor López
  - Wally Post
- July 14:
  - Bob Purkey
  - Pat Scott
- July 17 – Roy McMillan
- July 19 – Alice Pollitt
- July 20 – Mike Ilitch
- July 21 – Jerry Snyder
- July 28 – Ted Lepcio

=== August ===
- August 4 – Joe Pignatano
- August 7 – Don Larsen
- August 9 – Bernice Metesch
- August 14 – Jim Pisoni
- August 16 – Curt Roberts
- August 26 – Tom Poholsky

=== September ===
- September 1 – Mava Lee Thomas
- September 11 – Luis García
- September 12 – Tom Herrin
- September 15 – Lee Wheat
- September 18 – Mary Lou Beschorner
- September 19 – Ray Shearer
- September 22 – Harry Bright
- September 24 – Jim Mangan
- September 30 – Marv Blaylock

=== October ===
- October 1 – Jaynie Krick
- October 3 – Nancy Mudge
- October 8 – Bob Mabe
- October 10 – Bobby Tiefenauer
- October 11 – Skeeter Kell
- October 12 – Cartha Doyle
- October 17 – Hardy Peterson
- October 23 – Bruce Barmes
- October 24 – Jim Brosnan
- October 26 – Roland Hemond
- October 27 – Ange Armato

=== November ===
- November 9 – Don Plarski
- November 11 – Ike Delock
- November 14 – Jimmy Piersall
- November 17 – Norm Zauchin
- November 20 – Lou Berberet
- November 23:
  - John Anderson
  - Shirley Palesh
- November 30 – Leo Kiely

=== December ===
- December 1 – Nino Escalera
- December 13 – Billy Loes
- December 14:
  - Carl Linhart
  - Pete Whisenant
- December 15 – Ray Herbert
- December 18 – Gino Cimoli
- December 23 – Al Cicotte
- December 28 – Jean Marlowe
- December 30 – Bill Taylor

== Deaths ==
=== January ===
- January 2 – Denny Lyons, 62, third baseman who batted .310 lifetime, set record with 255 putouts in 1887; led American Association in slugging in 1890.
- January 3 – Charlie Smith, 48, pitcher who played from 1902 through 1914 for the Cleveland Bronchos, Washington Senators, Boston Red Sox and Chicago Cubs, ending with a 2.81 ERA in 1,349 innings
- January 7 – Law Daniels, 66, catcher/outfielder for two seasons from 1887 to 1888.
- January 9 – Frank Bliss, 76, catcher for the 1878 Milwaukee Grays.
- January 11 – Mike Golden, 77, pitcher and outfielder for the Keokuk Westerns, Chicago White Stockings, and Milwaukee Grays during his two-season career in 1875 and 1878.
- January 13 – Buck West, 68, outfielder for the 1884 Cincinnati Red Stockings and the 1890 Cleveland Spiders.
- January 14 – Fred Hayner, 57, pitcher for the 1890 Pittsburgh Alleghenys.
- January 18 – Michael Scanlon, 85, manager of two different Washington Nationals franchises in the 1880s
- January 23 – Henry Killilea, 65, attorney and team owner nicknamed "Godfather of the American League"; as owner of the Boston Americans (August 1901 to April 1904), he organized, with his Pittsburgh Pirates counterpart Barney Dreyfuss, 1903's first-ever World Series between the champions of the two major leagues
- January 24 – Charlie Hautz, 76, first baseman for the 1875 St. Louis Red Stockings and the 1884 Pittsburgh Alleghenys.
- January 28 – Al Strueve, 68, catcher/outfielder for the 1884 St. Louis Browns.
- January 30 – John Wood, 56, pitcher for the 1896 St. Louis Browns.

=== February ===
- February 1 – Walt Wilmot, 65, who led the National League in homeruns in 1890, and also scored 100 or more runs three times and twice collected 70 or more stolen bases.
- February 2:
  - Thorny Hawkes, 76, second baseman for the 1879 Troy Trojans and the 1884 Washington Nationals.
  - Mike Walsh, 78, Irish umpire in the National inaugural season in 1876, who later officiated in the National Association and the American Association and also managed the 1884 Louisville Colonels.
- February 11 – Dutch Ulrich, 29, native of Habsburg Empire and pitcher for the Philadelphia Phillies from 1925 through 1927.
- February 13 – Joe Straub, 71, German catcher who played in part of three seasons with the Troy Trojans, Philadelphia Athletics and Columbus Buckeyes between 1880 and 1883.
- February 26 – Jim Moroney, 45, pitcher for the Boston Beaneaters, Philadelphia Phillies and Chicago Cubs in part of three seasons spanning 1906–1912.

=== March ===
- March 1 – Ed Foster, 43, pitcher for the 1908 Cleveland Naps.
- March 2 – Tom Smith, 57, pitcher for the Boston Beaneaters, Philadelphia Phillies, Louisville Colonels and St. Louis Browns in four seasons between 1894 and 1898.
- March 5 – Lou Hardie, 64, catcher/outfielder for the Philadelphia Quakers, Chicago White Stockings, Boston Beaneaters and Baltimore Orioles in parts of four seasons spanning 1884–1891.
- March 13 – Sherry Magee, 44, left fielder for the Phillies who led the National League in RBI four times, and in hits, runs and doubles once each; also a batting champion in 1910, while his 441 career stolen bases included 23 thefts of home plate, and later became a NL umpire in 1928.
- March 23 – Denny Williams, 32, outfielder who played from 1921 to 1928 for the Cincinnati Reds and Boston Red Sox.
- March 25 – Roy Meeker, 28, pitcher for the Philadelphia Athletics and Cincinnati Reds over parts of the three seasons between 1923 and 1926,
- March 30 – Phil Redding, 39, pitcher who played with the St. Louis Cardinals from 1912 to 1923.

=== April ===
- April 5 – Tom Crooke, first baseman for the Washington Senators during the 1909 and 1910 seasons.
- April 12 – Tom Phillips, 40, pitcher for the St. Louis Browns, Cleveland Indians and Washington Senators in parts of four seasons spanning 1915–1922.
- April 13:
  - John Castle, 49, outfielder for the 1910 Philadelphia Phillies.
  - John Kelty, 58, outfielder for the 1890 Pittsburgh Alleghenys.
- April 20 – Bill Kissinger, 57, pitcher who played from 1895 through 1897 with the Baltimore Orioles and St. Louis Browns.
- April 30 – Dan Long, 61, outfielder for the 1890 Baltimore Orioles.

=== May ===
- May 13 – George Stallings, 61, manager who led the Miracle Braves to the 1914 World Series title, who also skippered the Phillies, Tigers and New York Highlanders.
- May 25 – Harvey Blauvelt, 61, relief pitcher for the 1890 Rochester Broncos.
- May 28 – Ollie Beard, 67, shortstop for the Cincinnati Red Stockings/Reds from 1889 to 1890 and third baseman for the 1891 Louisville Colonels; it is claimed that his family invented the Kentucky dish, Burgoo.

=== June ===
- June 4 – Harry Frazee, 48, Broadway theater impresario who owned the Boston Red Sox from November 2, 1916, to August 2, 1923; infamous for selling many star players — including the immortal Babe Ruth — to the New York Yankees to finance Broadway shows and pay off his debts, turning the Red Sox from World Series champions to pitiable cellar-dwellers within four years.
- June 15 – Tim Flood, 52, second baseman for the St. Louis Perfectos in 1899 and the Brooklyn Superbas from 1902 to 1903.
- June 16:
  - George Carman, 63, shortstop for the 1890 Philadelphia Athletics.
  - Mike Sullivan, 69, outfielder for the 1888 Philadelphia Athletics.
- June 18 – Frank Bishop, 68, infielder for the 1884 Chicago Browns.

=== July ===
- July 2 – Buck Hooker, 48, pitcher who played from 1902 through 1903 for the Cincinnati Reds.
- July 3 – Bill McClellan, 73, second baseman/shortstop for five teams between 1878 and 1888, primarily for the Brooklyn Grays/Bridegrooms from 1885 to 1888.
- July 5 – Ted Sullivan, 78, Irish outfielder/manager in the 1880s, who led the St. Louis Maroons of the Union Association to an astonishing 94–19 record in the 1884 season.
- July 8 – Joe Kappel, 72, backup outfielder/infielder for the 1884 Philadelphia Quakers and the 1890 Philadelphia Athletics.
- July 9 – Pete Cassidy, 56, first baseman who played with the Louisville Colonels, Brooklyn Superbas and Washington Senators in parts of two seasons spanning 1896–1899.
- July 12 – Jack Cronin, 55, pitcher who played seven seasons with seven teams in two different leagues between 1895 and 1904.
- July 19 – Tom O'Rourke, 63, backup catcher for the Boston Beaneaters, New York Giants and Syracuse Stars in parts of four seasons spanning 1887–1890.
- July 20 – Rupert Mills, 36, first baseman for the 1915 Newark Peppers of the Federal League, who, due to a term in his contract, "played" the non-existent 1916 season by showing up at the ballpark each day in uniform and ready to play, thereby earning his 1916 salary.
- July 21 – Frank Gilmore, 65, pitcher who played from 1886 through 1888 for the Washington Nationals.
- July 24 – George Miller, 76, backup catcher for the 1877 Cincinnati Reds and the 1884 Cincinnati Red Stockings.

=== August ===
- August 5 – Tony Brottem, 38, catcher/first baseman for the St. Louis Cardinals. Washington Senators and Pittsburgh Pirates during three seasons between 1916 and 1921.
- August 6 – Andy Cusick, 71, Irish catcher who played from 1884 through 1887 with the Wilmington Quicksteps and the Philadelphia Quakers.
- August 8 – Dan Minnehan, 63, third baseman for the 1895 Louisville Colonels.
- August 11 – Red Long, 52, Canadian pitcher for the 1902 Boston Beaneaters.
- August 15 – Jack Manning, 75, right fielder/pitcher for eight teams during 12 seasons in three different leagues, who in 1884 became the third player the collect a three-homerun game, behind Ned Williamson and Cap Anson.
- August 27 – Charlie Snow, 80, catcher for the 1874 Brooklyn Atlantics.
- August 28 – Ed Flynn, 65, catcher for the 1887 Cleveland Blues.

=== September ===
- September 2 – Bert Blue, 51, backup catcher who played for the St. Louis Browns and the Philadelphia Athletics during the 1908 season.
- September 22 – Ice Box Chamberlain, 61, pitcher who played for six teams in 10 seasons between 1886 and 1896, who led the American Association in shutouts (1890) and ranks 64th on the all-time complete games list (265).
- September 25 – Miller Huggins, 50, Hall of Fame manager who guided the New York Yankees to its first six American League pennants (1921–23; 1926–28) and three World Series titles (1923, 1927–28), including the legendary 1927 Murderers' Row squad. He died of blood poisoning on September 25.
- September 27 – John Gochnaur, 54, shortstop for the Brooklyn Superbas and the Cleveland Bronchos/Naps, who committed 98 errors in 1903, undoubtedly the worst major league single-season ever for a defensive player.

=== October ===
- October 1 – Lee Richmond, 72, pitcher whose 32 victories for the 1880 Worcesters Ruby Legs included the first perfect game in major league history.
- October 2 – Buck Hopkins, 46, backup outfielder for the St. Louis Cardinals in the 1907 season.
- October 9 – Red Kleinow, 42, catcher from 1904 through 1911 for the New York Highlanders, Boston Red Sox and Philadelphia Phillies.
- October 14 – Joe Borden, 75, pitcher with just a two-season career, who hurled the first no-hitter in professional organized baseball (1875), and later won the first game in National League history (1876).
- October 22:
  - Walt Lerian, 26, promising catcher of the Philadelphia Phillies from 1928 through 1929, who died just days after the conclusion of the 1929 season, when he was hit by out-of-control truck while standing on a Baltimore street.
  - Jim Manning, 67, outfielder/infielder for the Boston Beaneaters, Detroit Wolverines and Kansas City Cowboys in parts of five seasons spanning 1884–1889, who later managed the Washington Senators during the inaugural season of the American League in 1901.

=== November ===
- November 8 – Red Bittmann, 67, second baseman for the 1889 Kansas City Cowboys.
- November 10 – Mark Baldwin, 66, pitcher for five teams in three different leagues from 1887 to 1893, who posted a 154–165 record and a 3.37 ERA in 346 games, while leading the American Association with 33 wins in 1890 and for the most innings pitched in 1889 (513.2) and 1890 (492), and collected 296 complete games, which ranks him 46th on the all-time career list.
- November 11 – Sam White, 36, English catcher for the Boston Braves during the 1919 season.
- November 14 – Joe McGinnity, 58, Hall of Fame pitcher whose 246 victories included eight 20-win seasons, while leading the National League in wins five times, in innings four times and games six times, as his 31 wins for the 1903 New York Giants included three complete August doubleheaders, and also won 239 games in the minor leagues.
- November 15 – Billy Nash, 64, prominent third baseman for the Richmond Virginians, Boston Beaneaters and Philadelphia Phillies from 1884 through 1898, who posted a .275 batting average with 60 home runs and 979 runs batted in for 1550 games, while scoring 100 runs four times and collecting 110 or more RBI two times, also leading the National League in putouts, double plays and fielding average four times each.
- November 20:
  - Babe Doty, 61, pitcher who played for the 1890 Toledo Maumees.
  - Jim Powell, 70, first baseman who played from 1884 to 1885 with the Richmond Virginians and the Philadelphia Athletics.
- November 29 – Jimmy Whelan, 39, who appeared as a pinch-hitter in one game for the 1913 St. Louis Cardinals.

=== December ===
- December 11 – Doc McMahon, 42, pitcher for the 1908 Boston Red Sox in their inaugural season, who defeated the New York Highlanders, 11–3, in his only major league appearance.
- December 12 – Dick Buckley, backup catcher in 524 games for the Indianapolis Hoosiers, New York Giants, St. Louis Browns and Philadelphia Phillies from 1888 through 1895.
