= Heine Meine =

American baseball player (1896–1968)

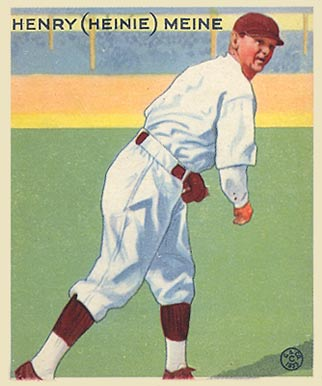
- Pitcher
- Born: May 1, 1896; St. Louis, Missouri, U.S.
- Died: March 18, 1968 (aged 71); St. Louis, Missouri, U.S.
- Batted: Right Threw: Right

MLB debut
- August 16, 1922, for the St. Louis Browns

Last MLB appearance
- September 18, 1934, for the Pittsburgh Pirates

MLB statistics
- Win–loss record: 66–50
- Earned run average: 3.95
- Strikeouts: 199
- Stats at Baseball Reference

Teams
- St. Louis Browns (1922); Pittsburgh Pirates (1929–1934)

Career highlights and awards
- NL wins leader (1931)

Henry William "Heine" Meine (May 1, 1896 – March 18, 1968), sometimes "Heinie" Meine, was an American professional baseball player. Meine was a right-handed pitcher who played for the St. Louis Browns in 1922 and for the Pittsburgh Pirates from 1929 to 1934. He was given the nickname "The Count of Luxemburg" on account of his operating a speakeasy/tavern in the Luxemburg section of St. Louis. He led the National League in wins and innings pitched in 1931 and compiled a 66–50 record in seven seasons of Major League Baseball.

== Spitball years ==
Born to parents of German descent and raised in St. Louis, Missouri, Meine served in the United States Army during World War I. After a tip that Meine, who was playing semipro ball in 1920, threw "a good spitball", he was signed to play professional baseball for Beaumont in the Texas League. Meine made his professional baseball debut in 1921 at age 25. He entered professional baseball the same year that the spitball, Meine's mainstay, was outlawed. Interviewed in 1963, Meine recalled:

After the Carl Mays–Ray Chapman accident in 1920, baseball outlawed all freak pitches and trick deliveries. I had one break. Either the news was slow in reaching Texas or they didn't care what the rest of the world did. The spitball was still a legal pitch in the Texas League in 1921. I could use it, but I knew if I wanted to go to the majors I'd have to change over completely.

In the years that followed, Meine was forced to develop new pitches. He became a control pitcher who did not pitch with great velocity, but could hit his spots. Some referred to him as a "junk man" or a "junkballer."

== St. Louis Browns and minor leagues ==
In 1922, Meine was sold to the St. Louis Browns but he appeared in only one game for the club, pitching four innings in relief. After the 1922 season, Meine spent three years in the minor leagues, pitching for the Syracuse Stars and Kansas City Blues. In 1926, he compiled a 17–14 record with a 3.27 ERA. Despite the 17-win season, Meine quit baseball after the 1926 season. He recalled, "It didn't look like I was going up, and I just retired. I had other income and didn't have to play baseball."

== Speakeasy operator ==
Meine owned a speakeasy in the St. Louis area. Sportswriter Red Smith recalled spending a few hours there as a young reporter and later wrote: "Heinie's store was genteel in a knock-down-drag-out way, and the specialty of the house in those prohibition days was a brand of Moose Milk that would peel the paint off a battleship." He was known through his career "The Count of Luxemburg," because he lived and operated his tavern in the unincorporated area south of St. Louis that was known as Luxemburg. When Pittsburgh outfielder Paul Waner showed up smelling of liquor and with eyes squinting for a 1932 game at Sportsman's Park in St Louis, the Cardinals' manager asked if Waner had a rough night. Waner replied, "Rough night? What a host that Meine is." In 1930, with Prohibition still in effect, one newspaper account reported that Meine owned "a soft drink parlor" in St. Louis. St. Louis sportswriter Bob Broeg noted that Meine's tavern was known for its "gemütlichkeit."

== Return to baseball in 1928 ==
Meine later recalled that the patrons at his drinking establishment motivated him to return to baseball: "In 1928, some of the boys in the tavern kept riding me, saying that I could win in semipro ball and in the minors, but never in the majors. So I rejoined Kansas City for part of the season and was up with Pittsburgh in '29." Meine compiled a 7–4 record for the Kansas City Blues in 1928. In 1929, he signed with the Pirates at age 33. He appeared in 22 games, 13 as a starter, for the 1929 Pirates, compiling a 7–6 record.

== Second retirement ==
A throat condition limited Meine's playing time during the 1930 season. He had been scheduled to pitch the season opener, but was unable to play due to an attack of tonsillitis. He did not appear in a game for the Pirates until May 5, when he gave up three runs in relief against the New York Giants. He left the team in mid-August due to illness, and was "placed on the voluntary retired list." In December 1930, it was determined that his tonsils had caused his illness, and he had them removed. Having been placed on the retired list, Meine was required to apply to Commissioner Kenesaw Mountain Landis seeking reinstatement. A total of 12 Pirates players, including future Hall of Famers Pie Traynor, Paul Waner, and Lloyd Waner, also had their tonsils removed. An Associated Press story in January 1931 noted: "The Pittsburgh Pirates think the reason they didn't finish higher in the National League race last season was because their tonsils were not so good. And if they're right, the boys point out, they should be one of the healthiest teams in the land this year."

== Comeback in 1931 at age 34 ==
Returning to baseball sans tonsils, Meine had the best year of his career in 1931. Having never won more than seven games in a season for the Pirates, Meine compiled a 19–13 record for the 1931 Pirates. In his first two games against the 1931 St. Louis Cardinals, he pitched shutouts against the group that went on to win 101 games and the 1931 World Series. He won his 19th game on September 23, 1931, pitching 13 innings in a 3–2 win over the Phillies. His 1931 performance led the National League in wins (19), innings pitched (284), and batters faced (1,202), and ranked fourth in earned run average (2.98).

After the 1931 season, Meine participated in an exhibition game at St. Louis between Max Carey's All-Stars (an all-star team of major leaguers) and the St. Louis Stars of the Negro leagues. Meine gave up 10 runs as the Stars won 10–8. The game may have inspired Kevin King's 2007 fictional account of a Negro leagues team defeating a team of major league all-stars. In King's account, Negro leagues star Mule Suttles tries to recall the list of major league all-stars who played in the game: "Heinie Manush, Heinie Meine, Heinie Schuble. They had Heinies coming out of the hiney, and we kicked their hineys."

== Holdout season of 1932 ==
In 1932, Meine was a holdout, refusing to accept the contract terms offered by the Pirates and declining to report to spring training in Paso Robles, California, with the rest of the team. Meine's holdout continued into May, making him the last player continuing to hold out for better contract terms. On May 16, 1932, The Pittsburgh Press referred to Meine as the "obstinate Pittsburgh holdout" and reported that the Pirates were trying to strike a deal to send Meine to the Brooklyn Dodgers. Meine ultimately reached terms with the Pirates in late May. After his holdout, Grantland Rice reported that Meine was being paid $11,500 for the year. Rice wrote a column praising Meine:

Meine was the hardest working pitcher in the National League last season. He hurled 22 complete games, worked 284 innings, won 19 games against 13 lost, and yielded an earned run average of 2.98. And all of this he did with a fifth place club.

When he led the Pirates to a 2–1 victory over Brooklyn in June 1932, The New York Times opened its game coverage as follows: "Heine Meine came to Ebbets Field with the Pirates yesterday and gave 18,000 fans an exhibition of his very best pitching by holding the Carey clan to five hits in seven innings." Meine compiled a 12–9 record and a 3.86 ERA in 1932.

== 1933 and 1934 seasons ==
When Meine signed his 1933 contract with the Pirates in January, the Associated Press noted that "such well-known exponents of the art of arguing over salary matters as Floyd Caves Herman and Heinie Meine, meekly came to terms." The New York Times referred to Meine as the "ace of the Pirates' pitching staff" and reported that his contract was for five figures and was for one year. He opened the season with a record of 5–0 to lead the National League in late May. When the Pirates honored Honus Wagner with a tribute day in May 1933, Meine pitched a 2–1 victory over the Brooklyn Dodgers. After a mid-season slump, Meine began to turn things around in late July. After pitching three shutout innings in relief to help the Pirates come from behind against the Giants, The Pittsburgh Press reported: "Just when all hope was being lost for him, Heinie Meine came back yesterday to confound the critics with a brilliant bit of relief pitching. The Duke of Luxembourg throttled the Giants ..." Meine finished the 1933 season with a 15–8 record and a 3.65 ERA, helping lead the Pirates to an 87–67 record and a second-place finish in the National League.

Meine returned to the Pirates in 1934 for his final year in Major League Baseball. He was the Pirates' starter in the season opener, but allowed seven runs in a 7–1 loss to the Cardinals at St. Louis. Used increasingly in relief, Meine appeared in 26 games, 14 as a starter. He compiled a 7–6 record and a 4.32 ERA. When Meine pitched a complete game, 4–1 victory over the Cubs in August 1934, the Chicago Daily Tribune reported: "Heinie Meine, a wobbly old timer who had pitched only one complete game this year, this afternoon felt no aches and pains in standing the Cubs on their heads for nine innings." His final major league appearance came in a 9–4 loss to the Dodgers on September 18, 1934, at Ebbets Field. Meine pitched one-third of an inning in relief and gave up four earned runs.

For his career, he compiled a 66–50 record in 165 appearances, with a 3.95 ERA and 199 strikeouts.

== Family and later years ==
Meine was married to Grace Bonds in November 1921. Their son, Howard Meine, pitched in St. Louis municipal baseball for several years.

After retiring from baseball, Meine returned to his tavern business. He also operated a baseball school at 153 Lemay Ferry Road south of St. Louis. He constructed a building with locker facilities for 50 to 60 boys. He hired former major league players, including Marty McManus, Vern Stephens, Phil Todt, and Monty Stratton, to work at the school and advertised his courses in The Sporting News. Meine also helped develop the Lemay Baseball Association in St. Louis, building a field next to his tavern and maintaining it himself. Heine Meine Field, built by Meine, remains in use as a baseball field.

Meine's hobbies in his later years included hunting, fishing and bowling.

In March 1968, Meine died of cancer at the Alexian Brothers Hospital in St. Louis.

== See also ==
- List of Major League Baseball annual wins leaders
