= 1929 St. Louis Cardinals season =

Major League Baseball season

1929 St. Louis Cardinals
- League: National League
- Ballpark: Sportsman's Park
- City: St. Louis, Missouri
- Record: 78–74 (.513)
- League place: 4th
- Owners: Sam Breadon
- General managers: Branch Rickey
- Managers: Billy Southworth, Gabby Street, Bill McKechnie
- Radio: KMOX (France Laux); KWK (Thomas Patrick)

The 1929 St. Louis Cardinals season was the team's 48th season in St. Louis, Missouri and the 38th season in the National League. The Cardinals went 78–74 during the season and finished fourth in the National League.

== Offseason ==
- December 13, 1928: Tommy Thevenow was traded by the Cardinals to the Philadelphia Phillies for Heinie Sand and $10,000.

== Regular season ==
=== Season standings ===
National League
Team	W	L	Pct.	GB	Home	Road
Chicago Cubs	98	54	.645	—	52‍–‍25	46‍–‍29
Pittsburgh Pirates	88	65	.575	10½	45‍–‍31	43‍–‍34
New York Giants	84	67	.556	13½	39‍–‍37	45‍–‍30
St. Louis Cardinals	78	74	.513	20	43‍–‍32	35‍–‍42
Philadelphia Phillies	71	82	.464	27½	39‍–‍37	32‍–‍45
Brooklyn Robins	70	83	.458	28½	42‍–‍35	28‍–‍48
Cincinnati Reds	66	88	.429	33	38‍–‍39	28‍–‍49
Boston Braves	56	98	.364	43	34‍–‍43	22‍–‍55

=== Record vs. opponents ===
1929 National League record Sources:
Team	BSN	BRO	CHC	CIN	NYG	PHI	PIT	STL
Boston	—	11–11	7–15	8–14	9–13	5–17	8–14	8–14
Brooklyn	11–11	—	6–16	11–11	14–7	9–13	9–13	10–12
Chicago	15–7	16–6	—	14–8–1	12–10–1	17–5–1	9–13	15–5–1
Cincinnati	14–8	11–11	8–14–1	—	10–12	11–11	9–13	3–19
New York	13–9	7–14	10–12–1	12–10	—	16–5	13–8	13–9
Philadelphia	17–5	13–9	5–17–1	11–11	5–16	—	11–11	9–13
Pittsburgh	14–8	13–9	13–9	13–9	8–13	11–11	—	16–6–1
St. Louis	14–8	12–10	5–15–1	19–3	9–13	13–9	6–16–1	—

=== Roster ===
1929 St. Louis Cardinals
Roster
Pitchers: Pete Alexander; Hi Bell; Bill Doak; Fred Frankhouse; Hal Goldsmith; Al Grabowski; Hal Haid; Jesse Haines; Bill Hallahan; Carmen Hill; Mul Holland; Syl Johnson; Jim Lindsey; Clarence Mitchell; Bill Sherdel	Catchers: Bubber Jonnard; Earl Smith; Jimmie Wilson; Infielders: Jim Bottomley; Johnny Butler; Eddie Delker; Frankie Frisch; Charlie Gelbert; Fred Haney; Andy High; Carey Selph	Outfielders: Taylor Douthit; Chick Hafey; Wattie Holm; Ernie Orsatti; Wally Roettger; Billy Southworth	Manager: Bill McKechnie; Billy Southworth; Gabby Street; Coaches: Greasy Neale

== Player stats ==
=== Batting ===
==== Starters by position ====
Note: Pos = Position; G = Games played; AB = At bats; H = Hits; Avg. = Batting average; HR = Home runs; RBI = Runs batted in

Pos	Player	G	AB	H	Avg.	HR	RBI
C	Jimmie Wilson	120	394	128	.325	4	71
1B	Jim Bottomley	146	560	176	.314	29	137
2B	Frankie Frisch	138	527	176	.334	5	74
SS	Charlie Gelbert	146	512	134	.262	3	65
3B	Andy High	146	603	178	.295	10	63
OF	Chick Hafey	134	517	175	.338	29	125
OF	Taylor Douthit	150	613	206	.336	9	62
OF	Ernie Orsatti	113	346	115	.332	3	39

==== Other batters ====
Note: G = Games played; AB = At bats; H = Hits; Avg. = Batting average; HR = Home runs; RBI = Runs batted in

Player	G	AB	H	Avg.	HR	RBI
Wally Roettger	79	269	68	.253	3	42
Wattie Holm	64	176	41	.233	0	14
Earl Smith	57	145	50	.345	1	22
Johnny Butler	17	55	9	.164	0	5
Carey Selph	25	51	12	.235	0	7
Eddie Delker	22	40	6	.150	0	3
Billy Southworth	19	32	6	.188	0	3
Bubber Jonnard	18	31	3	.097	0	2
Fred Haney	10	26	3	.115	0	2

=== Pitching ===
==== Starting pitchers ====
Note: G = Games pitched; IP = Innings pitched; W = Wins; L = Losses; ERA = Earned run average; SO = Strikeouts

Player	G	IP	W	L	ERA	SO
Bill Sherdel	33	195.2	10	15	5.93	69
Jesse Haines	28	179.2	13	10	5.71	59
Clarence Mitchell	25	173.0	8	11	4.27	39
Pete Alexander	22	132.0	9	8	3.89	38
Al Grabowski	6	50.0	3	2	2.52	22
Jim Lindsey	2	16.1	1	1	5.51	8

==== Other pitchers ====
Note: G = Games pitched; IP = Innings pitched; W = Wins; L = Losses; ERA = Earned run average; SO = Strikeouts

Player	G	IP	W	L	ERA	SO
Syl Johnson	42	182.1	13	7	3.60	80
Hal Haid	38	154.2	9	9	4.07	41
Fred Frankhouse	30	133.1	7	2	4.12	37
Bill Hallahan	20	93.2	4	4	4.42	52
Bill Doak	3	9.0	1	2	12.00	3
Carmen Hill	3	8.2	0	0	8.31	1

==== Relief pitchers ====
Note: G = Games pitched; W = Wins; L = Losses; SV = Saves; ERA = Earned run average; SO = Strikeouts

Player	G	W	L	SV	ERA	SO
Mul Holland	8	0	1	0	9.42	5
Hi Bell	7	0	2	0	6.92	4
Hal Goldsmith	2	0	0	0	6.75	0

== Farm system ==
Level	Team	League	Manager
AA	Rochester Red Wings	International League	Bill McKechnie and Billy Southworth
A	Houston Buffaloes	Texas League	Frank Snyder and Gene Bailey
B	Danville Veterans	Illinois–Indiana–Iowa League	Joe Schultz, Sr.
C	Scottdale Scotties	Middle Atlantic League	Eddie Dyer
C	Shawnee Robins	Western Association	Ray Powell
D	Waynesboro Red Birds	Blue Ridge League	Kenzie Kirkham and Irwin Wimer
D	Laurel Cardinals	Cotton States League	Clay Hopper

LEAGUE CHAMPIONS: Rochester
