= Bob Linton =

American baseball player (1902–1980)

- Catcher
- Born: April 18, 1902; Emerson, Arkansas, U.S.
- Died: April 3, 1980 (aged 77); Destin, Florida, U.S.
- Batted: Left Threw: Right

MLB debut
- April 26, 1929, for the Pittsburgh Pirates

Last MLB appearance
- September 11, 1929, for the Pittsburgh Pirates

MLB statistics
- Batting average: .111
- Home runs: 0
- Runs batted in: 1
- Stats at Baseball Reference

Teams
- Pittsburgh Pirates (1929)

Claud Clarence "Bob" Linton (April 18, 1902 – April 3, 1980) was an American Major League Baseball catcher who appeared in 17 games with the 1929 Pittsburgh Pirates.
