= Ray Lucas (baseball) =

American baseball player (1908-1969)

- Pitcher
- Born: October 2, 1908; Springfield, Ohio, U.S.
- Died: October 9, 1969 (aged 61); Harrison, Michigan, U.S.
- Batted: Right Threw: Right

MLB debut
- September 28, 1929, for the New York Giants

Last MLB appearance
- June 6, 1934, for the Brooklyn Dodgers

MLB statistics
- Win–loss record: 1–1
- Earned run average: 5.79
- Strikeouts: 5
- Stats at Baseball Reference

Teams
- New York Giants (1929–1931); Brooklyn Dodgers (1933–1934)

Ray Wesley Lucas (October 2, 1908 – October 9, 1969) was an American Major League Baseball pitcher, and a minor league baseball manager and scout.

Lucas pitched in parts of five Major league seasons with the New York Giants and the Brooklyn Dodgers. He posted a 1–1 record in 22 games, with one save and a 5.79 ERA. At the plate, Lucas went three for nine for a .333 lifetime batting average.

Lucas had some managerial stints in the minor leagues in Tampa including part of a season with the Kinston Eagles. He pitched in the minors from 1929 to 1941. Lucas' best seasons were his last two when he went 37–22 in the West Texas–New Mexico League. His playing career ended abruptly after he lost the fingers of his left hand in a hunting accident.

After retiring as a player, Lucas worked as a scout for the Toledo Mud Hens.

He was born in Springfield, Ohio, and died in Harrison, Michigan.
