= Mel Ingram =

American baseball player (1904–1979)

- Pinch runner
- Born: July 4, 1904; Asheville, North Carolina
- Died: October 28, 1979 (aged 75); Medford, Oregon
- Batted: Right Threw: Right

MLB debut
- July 24, 1929, for the Pittsburgh Pirates

Last MLB appearance
- August 28, 1929, for the Pittsburgh Pirates

MLB statistics
- Games: 3
- At bats: 0
- Runs: 1
- Stats at Baseball Reference

Teams
- Pittsburgh Pirates (1929)

Melvin David Ingram (July 4, 1904 – October 28, 1979) was a Major League Baseball player. Ingram played for the Pittsburgh Pirates in 1929 as a pinch runner in 3 games.

Ingram was born in Asheville, North Carolina and died in Medford, Oregon. He attended Gonzaga University from 1925 to 1929 where he played football, basketball, baseball and also ran track. He lettered in all four sports - resulting in 15 of 16 total letters in his days at Gonzaga. After college he signed with Pittsburgh, only after being guaranteed an early release to go into coaching college baseball in Wallace, Idaho for the Bulldogs from 1925-1928.
