= Terry Lyons (baseball) =

American baseball player

- First baseman
- Born: December 14, 1908; New Holland, Ohio
- Died: September 9, 1959 (aged 50); Dayton, Ohio
- Batted: Right Threw: Right

MLB debut
- April 19, 1929, for the Philadelphia Phillies

Last MLB appearance
- April 19, 1929, for the Philadelphia Phillies

MLB statistics
- Games played: 1
- At bats: 0
- Hits: 0
- Stats at Baseball Reference

Teams
- Philadelphia Phillies (1929)

Terrance Hillbert Lyons (December 14, 1908 – September 9, 1959) was a Major League Baseball first baseman. Lyons played in one game for the Philadelphia Phillies on April 19, 1929, coming into the game as a Defensive substitution.
