= 1929 New York Giants (MLB) season =

1929 New York Giants
- League: National League
- Ballpark: Polo Grounds
- City: New York City
- Record: 84–67 (.556)
- League place: 3rd
- Owners: Charles Stoneham
- Managers: John McGraw

The 1929 New York Giants season was the franchise's 47th season. The team finished in third place in the National League with an 84–67 record, 13½ games behind the Chicago Cubs. In a home game against the Pittsburgh Pirates on July 5 at the Polo Grounds, the Giants used the first public address system to be used in a major league ballpark.

== Regular season ==
=== Season standings ===
National League
Team	W	L	Pct.	GB	Home	Road
Chicago Cubs	98	54	.645	—	52‍–‍25	46‍–‍29
Pittsburgh Pirates	88	65	.575	10½	45‍–‍31	43‍–‍34
New York Giants	84	67	.556	13½	39‍–‍37	45‍–‍30
St. Louis Cardinals	78	74	.513	20	43‍–‍32	35‍–‍42
Philadelphia Phillies	71	82	.464	27½	39‍–‍37	32‍–‍45
Brooklyn Robins	70	83	.458	28½	42‍–‍35	28‍–‍48
Cincinnati Reds	66	88	.429	33	38‍–‍39	28‍–‍49
Boston Braves	56	98	.364	43	34‍–‍43	22‍–‍55

=== Record vs. opponents ===
1929 National League record Sources:
Team	BSN	BRO	CHC	CIN	NYG	PHI	PIT	STL
Boston	—	11–11	7–15	8–14	9–13	5–17	8–14	8–14
Brooklyn	11–11	—	6–16	11–11	14–7	9–13	9–13	10–12
Chicago	15–7	16–6	—	14–8–1	12–10–1	17–5–1	9–13	15–5–1
Cincinnati	14–8	11–11	8–14–1	—	10–12	11–11	9–13	3–19
New York	13–9	7–14	10–12–1	12–10	—	16–5	13–8	13–9
Philadelphia	17–5	13–9	5–17–1	11–11	5–16	—	11–11	9–13
Pittsburgh	14–8	13–9	13–9	13–9	8–13	11–11	—	16–6–1
St. Louis	14–8	12–10	5–15–1	19–3	9–13	13–9	6–16–1	—

=== Roster ===
1929 New York Giants
Roster
Pitchers: Larry Benton; Freddie Fitzsimmons; Joe Genewich; Dutch Henry; Carl Hubbell; Ralph Judd; Ray Lucas; Carl Mays; Roy Parmelee; Jack Scott; Jim Tennant; Bill Walker	Catchers: Jack Cummings; Shanty Hogan; Bob O'Farrell; Ray Schalk; Pat Veltman; Infielders: Andy Cohen; Pat Crawford; Doc Farrell; Travis Jackson; Buck Jordan; Freddie Lindstrom; Doc Marshall; Andy Reese; Bill Terry	Outfielders: Chick Fullis; Tony Kaufmann; Freddy Leach; Sam Leslie; Mel Ott; Edd Roush; Jimmy Welsh	Manager: John McGraw; Coaches: Bert Niehoff

== Player stats ==
= Indicates team leader

=== Batting ===
==== Starters by position ====
Note: Pos = Position; G = Games played; AB = At bats; H = Hits; Avg. = Batting average; HR = Home runs; RBI = Runs batted in

Pos	Player	G	AB	H	Avg.	HR	RBI
C	Shanty Hogan	102	317	95	.300	5	45
1B	Bill Terry	150	607	226	.372	14	117
2B	Andy Cohen	101	347	102	.294	5	47
SS	Travis Jackson	149	551	162	.294	21	94
3B	Freddie Lindstrom	130	549	175	.319	15	91
OF	Mel Ott	150	545	179	.328	42	151
OF	Edd Roush	115	450	146	.324	8	52
OF	Freddy Leach	113	411	119	.290	8	47

==== Other batters ====
Note: G = Games played; AB = At bats; H = Hits; Avg. = Batting average; HR = Home runs; RBI = Runs batted in

Player	G	AB	H	Avg.	HR	RBI
Chick Fullis	86	274	79	.288	7	29
Bob O'Farrell	91	248	76	.306	4	42
Andy Reese	58	209	55	.263	0	21
Doc Farrell	63	178	38	.213	0	16
Jimmy Welsh	38	129	32	.248	2	8
Pat Crawford	65	57	17	.298	3	24
Tony Kaufmann	39	32	1	.031	0	1
Doc Marshall	5	15	6	.400	0	2
Jack Cummings	3	3	1	.333	0	0
Ray Schalk	5	2	0	.000	0	0
Buck Jordan	2	2	1	.500	0	0
Pat Veltman	3	1	0	.000	0	0
Sam Leslie	1	1	0	.000	0	1

=== Pitching ===
= Indicates league leader

==== Starting pitchers ====
Note: G = Games pitched; IP = Innings pitched; W = Wins; L = Losses; ERA = Earned run average; SO = Strikeouts

Player	G	IP	W	L	ERA	SO
Carl Hubbell	39	268.0	18	11	3.69	106
Larry Benton	39	237.0	11	17	4.14	63
Freddie Fitzsimmons	37	221.2	15	11	4.10	55
Bill Walker	29	177.2	14	7	3.09	65

==== Other pitchers ====
Note: G = Games pitched; IP = Innings pitched; W = Wins; L = Losses; ERA = Earned run average; SO = Strikeouts

Player	G	IP	W	L	ERA	SO
Carl Mays	37	123.0	6	2	4.32	32
Dutch Henry	27	101.1	5	6	3.82	27
Jack Scott	30	91.2	7	6	3.53	40
Joe Genewich	21	85.0	3	7	6.78	19
Roy Parmelee	2	7.0	1	0	9.00	1

==== Relief pitchers ====
Note: G = Games pitched; W = Wins; L = Losses; SV = Saves; ERA = Earned run average; SO = Strikeouts

Player	G	W	L	SV	ERA	SO
Ralph Judd	18	3	0	0	2.66	21
Ray Lucas	3	0	0	1	0.00	1
Jim Tennant	1	0	0	0	0.00	1

== Farm system ==
Level	Team	League	Manager
A	Bridgeport Bears	Eastern League	Hans Lobert
