= Jim Stroner =

American baseball player (1901–1975)

- Third baseman
- Born: May 29, 1901; Chicago, Illinois
- Died: December 6, 1975 (aged 74); Tarboro, North Carolina
- Batted: Right Threw: Right

MLB debut
- May 1, 1929, for the Pittsburgh Pirates

Last MLB appearance
- May 31, 1929, for the Pittsburgh Pirates

MLB statistics
- Games played: 6
- At bats: 8
- Hits: 3
- Stats at Baseball Reference

Teams
- Pittsburgh Pirates (1929)

James Melvin Stroner (May 29, 1901 – December 6, 1975) was a third baseman in Major League Baseball. He played for the Pittsburgh Pirates.
