= Elmer Miller (pitcher) =

American baseball player (1903-1987)

- Pitcher/Outfielder
- Born: April 17, 1903; Detroit, Michigan
- Died: January 8, 1987 (aged 83); Corona, California
- Batted: Left Threw: Left

MLB debut
- June 21, 1929, for the Philadelphia Phillies

Last MLB appearance
- August 22, 1929, for the Philadelphia Phillies

MLB statistics
- Win–loss record: 0-1
- Strikeouts: 5
- Earned run average: 11.12
- Batting average: .237
- Home runs: 1
- Runs batted in: 4
- Stats at Baseball Reference

Teams
- Philadelphia Phillies (1929)

Elmer Joseph "Lefty" Miller (April 17, 1903 – January 8, 1987) was an American professional baseball player. He appeared in 31 games in Major League Baseball for the Philadelphia Phillies in 1929. Although he was best known as a pinch hitter, he appeared in eight games as a pitcher and four games as a right fielder.

Miller was born in Detroit, Michigan and died in Corona, California.
