= Dutch Kemner =

American baseball player (1899–1988)

- Pitcher
- Born: March 4, 1899; Quincy, Illinois
- Died: January 16, 1988 (aged 88); Quincy, Illinois
- Batted: Right Threw: Right

MLB debut
- April 19, 1929, for the Cincinnati Reds

Last MLB appearance
- June 8, 1929, for the Cincinnati Reds

MLB statistics
- Win–loss record: 0-0
- Earned run average: 7.63
- Strikeouts: 10
- Stats at Baseball Reference

Teams
- Cincinnati Reds (1929)

Herman John "Dutch" Kemner (March 4, 1899 – January 16, 1988) was a pitcher in Major League Baseball. He played for the Cincinnati Reds.
