= Ben Sankey (baseball) =

American baseball player (1907–2001)

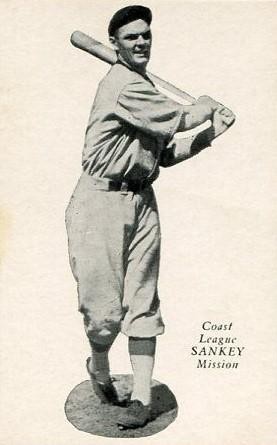
- Shortstop
- Born: September 2, 1907; Nauvoo, Alabama, U.S.
- Died: October 14, 2001 (aged 94); Washington, Georgia, U.S.
- Batted: Right Threw: Right

MLB debut
- October 5, 1929, for the Pittsburgh Pirates

Last MLB appearance
- September 27, 1931, for the Pittsburgh Pirates

MLB statistics
- Batting average: .213
- Home runs: 0
- Runs batted in: 14
- On Base Percentage: .281
- Slugging Percentage: .284
- On-base plus slugging: .565
- Stats at Baseball Reference

Teams
- Pittsburgh Pirates (1929–1931)

Benjamin Turner Sankey (September 2, 1907 – October 14, 2001) was an American Major League Baseball shortstop who played for the Pittsburgh Pirates over parts of three seasons from 1929 to 1931.Sankey played professional baseball until 1941 and retired at the age of 33. During his 13-year professional career he played across six leagues on nine teams. Although his MLB career was short lived, he gained popularity during his tenure with the Montreal Royals. During his six seasons in Montreal he learned French and became very popular among the people of Montreal. He was inducted in the International League Hall of Fame in 1947 as part of the inaugural class.
