= 1929 Brooklyn Robins season =

1929 Brooklyn Robins
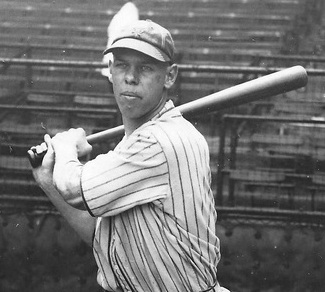
- Floyd "Babe" Herman, outfielder with the Brooklyn Robins, circa 1929.
- League: National League
- Ballpark: Ebbets Field
- City: Brooklyn, New York
- Record: 70–83 (.458)
- League place: 6th
- Owners: Stephen McKeever, Brooklyn Trust Company
- President: Wilbert Robinson
- Managers: Wilbert Robinson

The 1929 Brooklyn Robins finished the season in sixth place for the fifth straight season.

== Offseason ==
- December 11, 1929: Jesse Petty and Harry Riconda were traded by the Robins to the Pittsburgh Pirates for Glenn Wright.

== Regular season ==
=== Season standings ===
National League
| Team | W | L | Pct. | GB | Home | Road |
|---|---|---|---|---|---|---|
| Chicago Cubs | 98 | 54 | .645 | — | 52‍–‍25 | 46‍–‍29 |
| Pittsburgh Pirates | 88 | 65 | .575 | 10½ | 45‍–‍31 | 43‍–‍34 |
| New York Giants | 84 | 67 | .556 | 13½ | 39‍–‍37 | 45‍–‍30 |
| St. Louis Cardinals | 78 | 74 | .513 | 20 | 43‍–‍32 | 35‍–‍42 |
| Philadelphia Phillies | 71 | 82 | .464 | 27½ | 39‍–‍37 | 32‍–‍45 |
| Brooklyn Robins | 70 | 83 | .458 | 28½ | 42‍–‍35 | 28‍–‍48 |
| Cincinnati Reds | 66 | 88 | .429 | 33 | 38‍–‍39 | 28‍–‍49 |
| Boston Braves | 56 | 98 | .364 | 43 | 34‍–‍43 | 22‍–‍55 |

=== Record vs. opponents ===
1929 National League record Sources:
| Team | BSN | BRO | CHC | CIN | NYG | PHI | PIT | STL |
|---|---|---|---|---|---|---|---|---|
| Boston | — | 11–11 | 7–15 | 8–14 | 9–13 | 5–17 | 8–14 | 8–14 |
| Brooklyn | 11–11 | — | 6–16 | 11–11 | 14–7 | 9–13 | 9–13 | 10–12 |
| Chicago | 15–7 | 16–6 | — | 14–8–1 | 12–10–1 | 17–5–1 | 9–13 | 15–5–1 |
| Cincinnati | 14–8 | 11–11 | 8–14–1 | — | 10–12 | 11–11 | 9–13 | 3–19 |
| New York | 13–9 | 7–14 | 10–12–1 | 12–10 | — | 16–5 | 13–8 | 13–9 |
| Philadelphia | 17–5 | 13–9 | 5–17–1 | 11–11 | 5–16 | — | 11–11 | 9–13 |
| Pittsburgh | 14–8 | 13–9 | 13–9 | 13–9 | 8–13 | 11–11 | — | 16–6–1 |
| St. Louis | 14–8 | 12–10 | 5–15–1 | 19–3 | 9–13 | 13–9 | 6–16–1 | — |

=== Notable transactions ===
- April 18, 1929: Johnny Gooch and Rube Ehrhardt were traded by the Robins to the Cincinnati Reds for Val Picinich.
- July 24, 1929: Lou Koupal was traded by the Robins to the Philadelphia Phillies for Luther Roy.

=== Roster ===
1929 Brooklyn Robins
Roster
| Pitchers: Win Ballou; Clarence Blethen; Joe Bradshaw; Watty Clark; Clise Dudley; Jumbo Elliott; Alex Ferguson; Kent Greenfield; Lou Koupal; Doug McWeeny; Cy Moore; Johnny Morrison; Ray Moss; Bobo Newsom; Jimmy Pattison; Luther Roy; Dazzy Vance | Catchers: Hank DeBerry; Johnny Gooch; Butch Henline; Val Picinich; Infielders: Dave Bancroft; Del Bissonette; Jake Flowers; Wally Gilbert; Eddie Moore; Billy Rhiel; Jack Warner; Glenn Wright | Outfielders: Rube Bressler; Max Carey; Nick Cullop; Johnny Frederick; Harvey Hendrick; Babe Herman; Max West; Other batters: Johnny Gooch | Manager: Wilbert Robinson; Coaches: Otto Miller |

== Player stats ==
| = Indicates team leader |

| = Indicates league leader |

=== Batting ===
==== Starters by position ====
Note: Pos = Position; G = Games played; AB = At bats; H = Hits; Avg. = Batting average; HR = Home runs; RBI = Runs batted in

| Pos | Player | G | AB | H | Avg. | HR | RBI |
|---|---|---|---|---|---|---|---|
| C | Val Picinich | 93 | 273 | 71 | .260 | 4 | 31 |
| 1B | Del Bissonette | 116 | 431 | 121 | .281 | 12 | 75 |
| 2B | Eddie Moore | 111 | 402 | 119 | .296 | 0 | 48 |
| 3B | Wally Gilbert | 143 | 569 | 173 | .304 | 3 | 58 |
| SS | Dave Bancroft | 104 | 358 | 99 | .277 | 1 | 44 |
| OF | Johnny Frederick | 148 | 628 | 206 | .328 | 24 | 75 |
| OF | Babe Herman | 146 | 569 | 217 | .381 | 21 | 113 |
| OF | Rube Bressler | 136 | 456 | 145 | .318 | 9 | 77 |

==== Other batters ====
Note: G = Games played; AB = At bats; H = Hits; Avg. = Batting average; HR = Home runs; RBI = Runs batted in

| Player | G | AB | H | Avg. | HR | RBI |
|---|---|---|---|---|---|---|
| Harvey Hendrick | 110 | 384 | 136 | .354 | 14 | 82 |
| Hank DeBerry | 68 | 210 | 55 | .262 | 1 | 25 |
| Billy Rhiel | 76 | 205 | 57 | .278 | 4 | 25 |
| Jake Flowers | 46 | 130 | 26 | .200 | 1 | 16 |
| Butch Henline | 27 | 62 | 15 | .242 | 1 | 7 |
| Jack Warner | 17 | 62 | 17 | .274 | 0 | 4 |
| Nick Cullop | 13 | 41 | 8 | .195 | 1 | 5 |
| Glenn Wright | 24 | 25 | 5 | .200 | 1 | 6 |
| Max Carey | 19 | 23 | 7 | .304 | 0 | 1 |
| Max West | 5 | 8 | 2 | .250 | 0 | 1 |
| Johnny Gooch | 1 | 1 | 0 | .000 | 0 | 0 |

=== Pitching ===
| = Indicates league leader |

==== Starting pitchers ====
Note: G = Games pitched; IP = Innings pitched; W = Wins; L = Losses; ERA = Earned run average; SO = Strikeouts

| Player | G | IP | W | L | ERA | SO |
|---|---|---|---|---|---|---|
| Watty Clark | 41 | 279.0 | 16 | 19 | 3.74 | 140 |
| Dazzy Vance | 31 | 231.1 | 14 | 13 | 3.89 | 126 |
| Doug McWeeny | 36 | 146.0 | 4 | 10 | 6.10 | 59 |
| Alex Ferguson | 3 | 2.0 | 0 | 1 | 22.50 | 1 |

==== Other pitchers ====
Note: G = Games pitched; IP = Innings pitched; W = Wins; L = Losses; ERA = Earned run average; SO = Strikeouts

| Player | G | IP | W | L | ERA | SO |
|---|---|---|---|---|---|---|
| Ray Moss | 39 | 182.0 | 11 | 6 | 5.04 | 59 |
| Clise Dudley | 35 | 156.2 | 6 | 14 | 5.69 | 33 |
| Johnny Morrison | 39 | 136.2 | 13 | 7 | 4.48 | 57 |
| Jumbo Elliott | 6 | 19.0 | 1 | 2 | 6.63 | 7 |
| Bobo Newsom | 3 | 9.1 | 0 | 3 | 10.61 | 6 |

==== Relief pitchers ====
Note: G = Games pitched; W = Wins; L = Losses; SV = Saves; ERA = Earned run average; SO = Strikeouts

| Player | G | W | L | SV | ERA | SO |
|---|---|---|---|---|---|---|
| Cy Moore | 32 | 3 | 3 | 2 | 5.56 | 17 |
| Win Ballou | 25 | 2 | 3 | 0 | 6.71 | 20 |
| Lou Koupal | 18 | 0 | 1 | 4 | 5.36 | 17 |
| Kent Greenfield | 6 | 0 | 0 | 0 | 8.31 | 1 |
| Jimmy Pattison | 6 | 0 | 1 | 0 | 4.63 | 5 |
| Joe Bradshaw | 2 | 0 | 0 | 0 | 4.50 | 1 |
| Luther Roy | 2 | 0 | 0 | 0 | 4.91 | 0 |
| Clarence Blethen | 2 | 0 | 0 | 0 | 9.00 | 0 |
