= Sam Dailey =

American baseball player

- Pitcher
- Born: March 31, 1904; Oakford, Illinois, U.S.
- Died: December 2, 1979 (aged 75); Columbia, Missouri, U.S.
- Batted: Left Threw: Right

MLB debut
- July 4, 1929, for the Philadelphia Phillies

Last MLB appearance
- October 5, 1929, for the Philadelphia Phillies

MLB statistics
- Win–loss record: 2–2
- Earned run average: 7.54
- Strikeouts: 18
- Stats at Baseball Reference

Teams
- Philadelphia Phillies (1929)

Samuel Lawrence Dailey (March 31, 1904 – December 2, 1979) was an American pitcher in Major League Baseball. Dailey pitched for the Philadelphia Phillies in 1929, with 20 appearances, including four starts.
