= 1929 Boston Braves season =

1929 Boston Braves
- League: National League
- Ballpark: Braves Field
- City: Boston, Massachusetts
- Record: 56–98 (.364)
- League place: 8th
- Owners: Emil Fuchs
- Managers: Emil Fuchs
- Radio: WNAC (Fred Hoey)

The 1929 Boston Braves season was the 59th season of the franchise.

== Offseason ==
- November 7, 1928: Rogers Hornsby was traded by the Braves to the Chicago Cubs for Socks Seibold, Percy Jones, Lou Legett, Freddie Maguire, Bruce Cunningham, and $200,000.

== Regular season ==
=== Season standings ===
National League
Team	W	L	Pct.	GB	Home	Road
Chicago Cubs	98	54	.645	—	52‍–‍25	46‍–‍29
Pittsburgh Pirates	88	65	.575	10½	45‍–‍31	43‍–‍34
New York Giants	84	67	.556	13½	39‍–‍37	45‍–‍30
St. Louis Cardinals	78	74	.513	20	43‍–‍32	35‍–‍42
Philadelphia Phillies	71	82	.464	27½	39‍–‍37	32‍–‍45
Brooklyn Robins	70	83	.458	28½	42‍–‍35	28‍–‍48
Cincinnati Reds	66	88	.429	33	38‍–‍39	28‍–‍49
Boston Braves	56	98	.364	43	34‍–‍43	22‍–‍55

=== Record vs. opponents ===
1929 National League record Sources:
Team	BSN	BRO	CHC	CIN	NYG	PHI	PIT	STL
Boston	—	11–11	7–15	8–14	9–13	5–17	8–14	8–14
Brooklyn	11–11	—	6–16	11–11	14–7	9–13	9–13	10–12
Chicago	15–7	16–6	—	14–8–1	12–10–1	17–5–1	9–13	15–5–1
Cincinnati	14–8	11–11	8–14–1	—	10–12	11–11	9–13	3–19
New York	13–9	7–14	10–12–1	12–10	—	16–5	13–8	13–9
Philadelphia	17–5	13–9	5–17–1	11–11	5–16	—	11–11	9–13
Pittsburgh	14–8	13–9	13–9	13–9	8–13	11–11	—	16–6–1
St. Louis	14–8	12–10	5–15–1	19–3	9–13	13–9	6–16–1	—

=== Roster ===
1929 Boston Braves
Roster
Pitchers: Ed Brandt; Ben Cantwell; Bill Clarkson; Bruce Cunningham; Art Delaney; Kent Greenfield; Bunny Hearn; Bonnie Hollingsworth; Percy Jones; Dixie Leverett; Red Peery; Socks Seibold; Bob Smith; Clay Touchstone; Johnny Werts	Catchers: Pat Collins; Bill Cronin; Jack Cummings; Hank Gowdy; Lou Legett; Al Spohrer; Zack Taylor; Infielders: Les Bell; Joe Dugan; Johnny Evers; Doc Farrell; Bernie James; Freddie Maguire; Rabbit Maranville; Henry Peploski; Gene Robertson; George Sisler	Outfielders: Red Barron; Buzz Boyle; Earl Clark; Johnny Cooney; Bill Dunlap; George Harper; Heinie Mueller; Lance Richbourg; Jack Smith; Phil Voyles; Jimmy Welsh; Other batters: Al Weston	Manager: Emil Fuchs

== Player stats ==
=== Batting ===
==== Starters by position ====
Note: Pos = Position; G = Games played; AB = At bats; H = Hits; Avg. = Batting average; HR = Home runs; RBI = Runs batted in

Pos	Player	G	AB	H	Avg.	HR	RBI
C	Al Spohrer	114	342	93	.272	2	48
1B	George Sisler	154	629	205	.326	2	79
2B	Freddie Maguire	138	496	125	.252	0	41
SS	Rabbit Maranville	146	560	159	.284	0	55
3B	Les Bell	139	483	144	.298	9	72
OF	Lance Richbourg	139	557	170	.305	3	56
OF	George Harper	136	457	133	.291	10	68
OF	Earl Clark	84	279	88	.315	1	30

==== Other batters ====
Note: G = Games played; AB = At bats; H = Hits; Avg. = Batting average; HR = Home runs; RBI = Runs batted in

Player	G	AB	H	Avg.	HR	RBI
Jimmy Welsh	53	186	54	.290	2	16
Joe Dugan	60	125	38	.304	0	15
Zack Taylor	34	101	25	.248	0	10
Bernie James	46	101	31	.307	0	9
Heinie Mueller	46	93	19	.204	0	11
Lou Legett	39	81	13	.160	0	6
Johnny Cooney	41	72	23	.319	0	6
Phil Voyles	20	68	16	.235	0	14
Buzz Boyle	17	57	15	.263	1	2
Bill Dunlap	10	29	12	.414	1	4
Gene Robertson	8	28	8	.286	0	6
Red Barron	10	21	4	.190	0	1
Jack Smith	19	20	5	.250	0	2
Hank Gowdy	10	16	7	.438	0	3
Henry Peploski	6	10	2	.200	0	1
Bill Cronin	6	9	1	.111	0	0
Doc Farrell	5	8	1	.125	0	2
Jack Cummings	3	6	1	.167	0	1
Pat Collins	7	5	0	.000	0	2
Al Weston	3	3	0	.000	0	0
Johnny Evers	1	0	0	----	0	0

=== Pitching ===
==== Starting pitchers ====
Note: G = Games pitched; IP = Innings pitched; W = Wins; L = Losses; ERA = Earned run average; SO = Strikeouts

Player	G	IP	W	L	ERA	SO
Bob Smith	34	231.0	11	17	4.68	65
Socks Seibold	33	205.2	12	17	4.73	54
Ed Brandt	26	167.2	8	13	5.53	50
Ben Cantwell	27	157.0	4	13	4.47	25

==== Other pitchers ====
Note: G = Games pitched; IP = Innings pitched; W = Wins; L = Losses; ERA = Earned run average; SO = Strikeouts

Player	G	IP	W	L	ERA	SO
Percy Jones	35	188.1	7	15	4.64	69
Dixie Leverett	24	97.2	3	7	6.36	28
Bruce Cunningham	17	91.2	4	6	4.52	22
Art Delaney	20	75.0	3	5	6.12	17
Red Peery	9	44.0	0	1	5.11	3
Bunny Hearn	10	18.1	2	0	4.42	12
Kent Greenfield	6	15.2	0	0	10.91	7
Bill Clarkson	2	7.0	0	1	10.29	0

==== Relief pitchers ====
Note: G = Games pitched; W = Wins; L = Losses; SV = Saves; ERA = Earned run average; SO = Strikeouts

Player	G	W	L	SV	ERA	SO
Johnny Cooney	14	2	3	3	5.00	11
Johnny Werts	4	0	0	1	10.50	2
Clay Touchstone	1	0	0	0	16.88	1

== Farm system ==
Level	Team	League	Manager
A	Providence Grays	Eastern League	King Bader
