= 1929 Cincinnati Reds season =

1929 Cincinnati Reds
- League: National League
- Ballpark: Redland Field
- City: Cincinnati, Ohio
- Owners: C. J. McDiarmid, Sidney Weil
- Managers: Jack Hendricks

The 1929 Cincinnati Reds season was a season in American baseball. The team finished seventh in the National League with a record of 66–88, 33 games behind the Chicago Cubs.

== Off-season ==
On December 13, 1928, the Reds traded away catcher Bubbles Hargrave to the St. Paul Saints of the American Association. Hargrave had been with the team since 1921, and he led the National League with a .353 batting average in 1926. In 766 games with the club, Hargrave batted .314 with 29 home runs and 359 RBI. The Reds received pitcher Paul Zahniser, who had a 13–10 record with a 3.57 ERA in 30 games with the Saints. Zahniser had previous experience in the American League, as he pitched with the Washington Senators from 1923 to 1924 and the Boston Red Sox from 1925 to 1926. Between the two clubs, Zahniser had a 26–47 record with a 4.62 ERA in 124 games, and he led the AL in losses with 18 in 1926.

== Regular season ==
Very early in the season, the Reds traded catcher Val Picinich to the Brooklyn Robins in exchange for pitcher Rube Ehrhardt and catcher Johnny Gooch. Ehrhardt had a 1–3 record with a 4.67 ERA in 28 games during the 1928 season with Brooklyn. In his five years with Brooklyn, Ehrhardt had a 21–32 record with a 4.10 ERA in 169 games, twice leading the NL in games finished in both 1926 and 1927. Gooch split the 1928 season between the Robins and Pittsburgh Pirates, batting .282 with 17 RBI in 73 games.

Following a bad start to the season with a 6–11 record in their first 17 games, the Reds won five of their next six games to improve to only one game under .500. The Reds then lost 14 of their next 15 games to fall into the NL cellar with a 12–26 record, 12.5 games out of first place.

The Reds would struggle throughout the season, batting the Philadelphia Phillies, Brooklyn Robins and Boston Braves to stay out of last place. A highlight during the season was a 21–4 victory over the Phillies in June, while the Reds shutout the pennant winning Chicago Cubs 9–0 in a late-season game.

Cincinnati finished the 1929 season in seventh place with a 66–88 record, 33 games behind the Cubs for first place. The 66 wins was the fewest by the club in a season since 1916, when they had a 60–93 record. The Reds attendance dropped by nearly 200,000 fans, as the club drew 295,040, their lowest total since 1918.

Outfielder Curt Walker led the team with a .313 batting average and in home runs with seven, while finishing second with 83 RBI in 141 games. First baseman High Pockets Kelly hit .293 with five home runs and a team best 103 RBI in 147 games. Rookie outfielder Evar Swanson hit .300 with four home runs and 43 RBI, while leading the team with 172 hits, 100 runs, and 33 stolen bases.

On the mound, Red Lucas had a breakout season, leading the Reds with a 19–12 record and a team best 3.60 ERA and 270 innings pitched in 32 games. Lucas led the National League with 28 complete games.

=== Season standings ===
National League
Team	W	L	Pct.	GB	Home	Road
Chicago Cubs	98	54	.645	—	52‍–‍25	46‍–‍29
Pittsburgh Pirates	88	65	.575	10½	45‍–‍31	43‍–‍34
New York Giants	84	67	.556	13½	39‍–‍37	45‍–‍30
St. Louis Cardinals	78	74	.513	20	43‍–‍32	35‍–‍42
Philadelphia Phillies	71	82	.464	27½	39‍–‍37	32‍–‍45
Brooklyn Robins	70	83	.458	28½	42‍–‍35	28‍–‍48
Cincinnati Reds	66	88	.429	33	38‍–‍39	28‍–‍49
Boston Braves	56	98	.364	43	34‍–‍43	22‍–‍55

=== Record vs. opponents ===
1929 National League record Sources:
Team	BSN	BRO	CHC	CIN	NYG	PHI	PIT	STL
Boston	—	11–11	7–15	8–14	9–13	5–17	8–14	8–14
Brooklyn	11–11	—	6–16	11–11	14–7	9–13	9–13	10–12
Chicago	15–7	16–6	—	14–8–1	12–10–1	17–5–1	9–13	15–5–1
Cincinnati	14–8	11–11	8–14–1	—	10–12	11–11	9–13	3–19
New York	13–9	7–14	10–12–1	12–10	—	16–5	13–8	13–9
Philadelphia	17–5	13–9	5–17–1	11–11	5–16	—	11–11	9–13
Pittsburgh	14–8	13–9	13–9	13–9	8–13	11–11	—	16–6–1
St. Louis	14–8	12–10	5–15–1	19–3	9–13	13–9	6–16–1	—

=== Roster ===
1929 Cincinnati Reds
Roster
Pitchers: Ken Ash; Pete Donohue; Rube Ehrhardt; Benny Frey; Marv Gudat; Si Johnson; Dutch Kemner; Ray Kolp; Red Lucas; Dolf Luque; Jakie May; Eppa Rixey; Paul Zahniser	Catchers: Leo Dixon; Johnny Gooch; Hugh McMullen; Clyde Sukeforth; Ivey Wingo; Infielders: Hughie Critz; Chuck Dressen; Hod Ford; George Kelly; Pinky Pittinger; Wally Shaner; Joe Stripp	Outfielders: Ethan Allen; Pid Purdy; Evar Swanson; Curt Walker; Billy Zitzmann; Other batters: Estel Crabtree	Manager: Jack Hendricks; Coaches: Ivey Wingo

== Player stats ==
= Indicates team leader

=== Batting ===
==== Starters by position ====
Note: Pos = Position; G = Games played; AB = At bats; H = Hits; Avg. = Batting average; HR = Home runs; RBI = Runs batted in

Pos	Player	G	AB	H	Avg.	HR	RBI
C	Johnny Gooch	92	287	86	.300	0	34
1B	High Pockets Kelly	147	577	169	.293	5	103
2B	Hughie Critz	107	425	105	.247	1	50
SS	Hod Ford	148	529	146	.276	3	50
3B	Chuck Dressen	110	401	98	.244	1	36
OF	Curt Walker	141	492	154	.313	7	83
OF	Ethan Allen	143	538	157	.292	6	64
OF	Evar Swanson	148	574	172	.300	4	43

==== Other batters ====
Note: G = Games played; AB = At bats; H = Hits; Avg. = Batting average; HR = Home runs; RBI = Runs batted in

Player	G	AB	H	Avg.	HR	RBI
Clyde Sukeforth	84	237	84	.354	1	33
Pinky Pittenger	77	210	62	.295	0	27
Joe Stripp	64	187	40	.214	3	20
Pid Purdy	82	181	49	.271	1	16
Billy Zitzmann	47	84	19	.226	0	6
Leo Dixon	14	30	5	.167	0	2
Wally Shaner	13	28	9	.321	1	4
Ivey Wingo	1	1	0	.000	0	0
Hugh McMullen	1	1	0	.000	0	0
Estel Crabtree	1	1	0	.000	0	0

=== Pitching ===
==== Starting pitchers ====
Note: G = Games pitched; IP = Innings pitched; W = Wins; L = Losses; ERA = Earned run average; SO = Strikeouts

Player	G	IP	W	L	ERA	SO
Red Lucas	32	270.0	19	12	3.60	72
Eppa Rixey	35	201.0	10	13	4.16	37
Jakie May	41	199.0	10	14	4.61	92
Pete Donohue	32	177.2	10	13	5.42	30
Dolf Luque	32	176.0	5	16	4.50	43
Benny Frey	3	24.0	1	2	4.13	1

==== Other pitchers ====
Note: G = Games pitched; IP = Innings pitched; W = Wins; L = Losses; ERA = Earned run average; SO = Strikeouts

Player	G	IP	W	L	ERA	SO
Ray Kolp	30	145.1	8	10	4.03	27
Ken Ash	29	82.0	1	5	4.83	26
Marv Gudat	7	26.2	1	1	3.38	0

==== Relief pitchers ====
Note: G = Games pitched; W = Wins; L = Losses; SV = Saves; ERA = Earned run average; SO = Strikeouts

Player	G	W	L	SV	ERA	SO
Rube Ehrhardt	24	1	2	1	4.74	9
Dutch Kemner	9	0	0	1	7.63	10
Si Johnson	1	0	0	0	4.50	0
Paul Zahniser	1	0	0	0	27.00	0
