= Tommy Thevenow =

American baseball player (1903–1957)

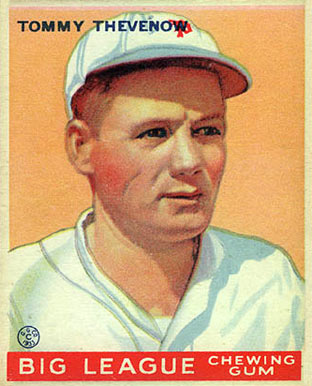
- Shortstop
- Born: September 6, 1903; Madison, Indiana, U.S.
- Died: July 29, 1957 (aged 53); Madison, Indiana, U.S.
- Batted: Right Threw: Right

MLB debut
- September 4, 1924, for the St. Louis Cardinals

Last MLB appearance
- October 2, 1938, for the Pittsburgh Pirates

MLB statistics
- Batting average: .247
- Hits: 1,030
- Home runs: 2
- Runs batted in: 456
- Stats at Baseball Reference

Teams
- St. Louis Cardinals (1924–1928); Philadelphia Phillies (1929–1930); Pittsburgh Pirates (1931–1935); Cincinnati Reds (1936); Boston Bees (1937); Pittsburgh Pirates (1938)

Career highlights and awards
- World Series champion (1926)

Thomas Joseph Thevenow (September 6, 1903 – July 29, 1957) was an American professional baseball shortstop. He played in Major League Baseball (MLB) from 1924 to 1938 for the St. Louis Cardinals, Philadelphia Phillies, Pittsburgh Pirates, Cincinnati Reds, and Boston Bees. Thevenow epitomized the good-fielding / weak-hitting shortstops that prevailed in the era, ending his career with a fielding percentage of .947, but a batting average of .247 while hitting only two home runs in his 15-year career. He hit two home runs in 1926, both inside-the-park home runs, and then never hit another home run in his next 12 seasons, setting a major league record of 3,347 consecutive at bats without a home run.

== Baseball career ==
Thevenow was acquired by the Cardinals on September 3, 1924, when he was purchased from the Syracuse Stars of the Class AA International League, where he played 140 games that season. He played 23 games for the Cardinals that season, debuting on September 4 and finishing the season with a batting average of .202. He played 50 games with St. Louis in 1925, concluding the season with a .269 average, in addition to 112 games played for Syracuse.

During the 1926 season, Thevenow hit the first home run of his major league career on September 17 off Cincinnati Reds pitcher Jack Knight, an inside-the-park homer that was part of 10–1 win over fading Cincinnati; the Reds went on to lose seven of their last nine games down the stretch. Five days later, Thevenow would hit another inside-the-park home run, the second and final regular season home run of his career, as the Cardinals beat the Brooklyn Dodgers by a score of 15–7, putting the Cardinals 2 1/2 games ahead of the Reds for first place in the National League. Over the rest of the 1926 season and the next 12 years of his major league career, Thevenow would not hit another home run (his final 3,347 at-bats), the most consecutive at bats without a home run in major league history. He finished the 1926 season with a .256 batting average and came in fourth in balloting for that season's National League Most Valuable Player, an award won by teammate Bob O'Farrell.

The Cardinals won the NL pennant and faced the New York Yankees in the 1926 World Series. In the second game of the series, Thevenow hit a ball to right field off Yankee pitcher Sad Sam Jones which Babe Ruth could not corral as he ran towards the ball at full speed. Thevenow rounded the bases and scored ahead of Ruth's throw to the plate. The official scorer's ruling was an inside-the-park home run. Thevenow would go on to get 10 hits in 24 at-bats for a .417 batting average, leading the Cardinals to win the series in seven games.

Thevenow's hitting dropped below the Mendoza Line in 1927, with an average of .194 in 59 games. He picked it up a bit in 1928, ending the season having played 69 games and finishing with a .205 batting average. Following the season, the Cardinals traded him to the Philadelphia Phillies in exchange for shortstop Heinie Sand and $10,000.

== Personal life ==
Thevenow died at age 53 on July 29, 1957, due to a cerebral hemorrhage. He had operated a grocery store in his hometown of Madison, Indiana following his retirement from baseball.
