= John Williams (pitcher) =

American baseball player

- Pitcher
- Born: December 3, 1904; South Bend, Indiana, U.S.
- Died: Unknown
- Threw: Right

Negro league baseball debut
- 1926, for the Dayton Marcos

Last appearance
- 1930, for the St. Louis Stars

Teams
- Dayton Marcos (1926); St. Louis Stars (1927–1930)

John Wesley Williams (December 3, 1904 – death unknown), nicknamed "Big Boy", was an American Negro league baseball player, primarily a pitcher, between 1926 and 1936.

A native of South Bend, Indiana, Williams made his Negro leagues debut in 1926 with the Dayton Marcos. He spent 1927 through 1930 with the St. Louis Stars, and was credited with a win and a loss in 12 innings pitched in the Stars' 1928 Negro National League championship series victory over the Chicago American Giants. He also played in the outfield when not pitching.
