= 1929 Chicago Cubs season =

1929 Chicago Cubs
- National League champions
- League: National League
- Ballpark: Wrigley Field
- City: Chicago
- Record: 98–54 (.645)
- League place: 1st
- Owners: William Wrigley Jr.
- Managers: Joe McCarthy
- Radio: WBBM (Pat Flanagan); WCFL (Johnny O'Hara); WGN (Quin Ryan); WMAQ (Hal Totten)

The 1929 Chicago Cubs season was the 58th season of the Chicago Cubs franchise, the 54th in the National League and the 14th at Wrigley Field. The Cubs finished first in the National League with a record of 98–54, 10.5 games ahead of the second place Pittsburgh Pirates. The team was defeated four games to one by the Philadelphia Athletics in the 1929 World Series.

== Offseason ==
- October 3, 1928: Mike Cvengros was drafted by the Cubs from the Wichita Falls Spudders in the 1928 rule 5 draft.
- November 7, 1928: Socks Seibold, Percy Jones, Lou Legett, Freddie Maguire, Bruce Cunningham, and $200,000 were traded by the Cubs to the Boston Braves for Rogers Hornsby.

== Regular season ==
Rogers Hornsby, who was acquired from the Boston Braves in an offseason deal, had a career year, hitting .380. In the process, he hit 39 home runs with 149 RBIs and led the league with a .679 slugging percentage. The 156 runs scored by Hornsby in 1929 were the most by a right-handed batter in the National League during the 20th century. Hornsby collected his second Most Valuable Player award that year, and for the second time he won a National League pennant.

=== Season standings ===
National League
Team	W	L	Pct.	GB	Home	Road
Chicago Cubs	98	54	.645	—	52‍–‍25	46‍–‍29
Pittsburgh Pirates	88	65	.575	10½	45‍–‍31	43‍–‍34
New York Giants	84	67	.556	13½	39‍–‍37	45‍–‍30
St. Louis Cardinals	78	74	.513	20	43‍–‍32	35‍–‍42
Philadelphia Phillies	71	82	.464	27½	39‍–‍37	32‍–‍45
Brooklyn Robins	70	83	.458	28½	42‍–‍35	28‍–‍48
Cincinnati Reds	66	88	.429	33	38‍–‍39	28‍–‍49
Boston Braves	56	98	.364	43	34‍–‍43	22‍–‍55

=== Record vs. opponents ===
1929 National League record Sources:
Team	BSN	BRO	CHC	CIN	NYG	PHI	PIT	STL
Boston	—	11–11	7–15	8–14	9–13	5–17	8–14	8–14
Brooklyn	11–11	—	6–16	11–11	14–7	9–13	9–13	10–12
Chicago	15–7	16–6	—	14–8–1	12–10–1	17–5–1	9–13	15–5–1
Cincinnati	14–8	11–11	8–14–1	—	10–12	11–11	9–13	3–19
New York	13–9	7–14	10–12–1	12–10	—	16–5	13–8	13–9
Philadelphia	17–5	13–9	5–17–1	11–11	5–16	—	11–11	9–13
Pittsburgh	14–8	13–9	13–9	13–9	8–13	11–11	—	16–6–1
St. Louis	14–8	12–10	5–15–1	19–3	9–13	13–9	6–16–1	—

=== Roster ===
1929 Chicago Cubs
Roster
Pitchers: Sheriff Blake; Guy Bush; Hal Carlson; Mike Cvengros; Hank Grampp; Trader Horne; Claude Jonnard; Pat Malone; Art Nehf; Bob Osborn; Ken Penner; Charlie Root	Catchers: Tom Angley; Mike González; Earl Grace; Gabby Hartnett; Johnny Schulte; Zack Taylor; Infielders: Clyde Beck; Footsie Blair; Woody English; Charlie Grimm; Rogers Hornsby; Norm McMillan; Chick Tolson	Outfielders: Kiki Cuyler; Cliff Heathcote; Johnny Moore; Riggs Stephenson; Danny Taylor; Hack Wilson	Manager: Joe McCarthy; Coaches: Jimmy Burke; Mickey Doolan; Grover Land

== Player stats ==
= Indicates league leader

=== Batting ===
==== Starters by position ====
Note: Pos = Position; G = Games played; AB = At bats; H = Hits; Avg. = Batting average; HR = Home runs; RBI = Runs batted in

Pos	Player	G	AB	H	Avg.	HR	RBI
C	Zack Taylor	64	215	59	.274	1	31
1B	Charlie Grimm	120	463	138	.298	10	91
2B	Rogers Hornsby	156	602	229	.380	39	149
SS	Woody English	144	608	168	.276	1	52
3B	Norm McMillan	124	495	134	.271	5	55
OF	Riggs Stephenson	136	495	179	.362	17	110
OF	Kiki Cuyler	139	509	183	.360	15	102
OF	Hack Wilson	150	574	198	.345	39	159

==== Other batters ====
Note: G = Games played; AB = At bats; H = Hits; Avg. = Batting average; HR = Home runs; RBI = Runs batted in

Player	G	AB	H	Avg.	HR	RBI
Cliff Heathcote	82	224	70	.313	2	31
Clyde Beck	54	190	40	.211	0	9
Mike González	60	167	40	.240	0	18
Chick Tolson	32	109	28	.257	1	19
Earl Grace	27	80	20	.250	2	17
Footsie Blair	26	72	23	.319	1	8
Johnny Schulte	31	69	18	.261	0	9
Johnny Moore	37	63	18	.286	2	8
Gabby Hartnett	25	22	6	.273	1	9
Tom Angley	5	16	4	.250	0	6
Danny Taylor	2	3	0	.000	0	0

=== Pitching ===
==== Starting pitchers ====
Note: G = Games pitched; IP = Innings pitched; W = Wins; L = Losses; ERA = Earned run average; SO = Strikeouts

Player	G	IP	W	L	ERA	SO
Charlie Root	43	272.0	19	6	3.47	124
Pat Malone	40	267.0	22	10	3.57	166
Sheriff Blake	35	218.1	14	13	4.29	70
Hank Grampp	1	2.0	0	1	27.00	0

==== Other pitchers ====
Note: G = Games pitched; IP = Innings pitched; W = Wins; L = Losses; ERA = Earned run average; SO = Strikeouts

Player	G	IP	W	L	ERA	SO
Guy Bush	50	270.2	18	7	3.66	82
Art Nehf	32	120.2	8	5	5.59	27
Hal Carlson	31	111.2	11	5	5.16	35
Bob Osborn	3	9.0	0	0	3.00	1

==== Relief pitchers ====
Note: G = Games pitched; W = Wins; L = Losses; SV = Saves; ERA = Earned run average; SO = Strikeouts

Player	G	W	L	SV	ERA	SO
Mike Cvengros	32	5	4	2	4.64	23
Claude Jonnard	12	0	1	0	7.48	11
Trader Horne	11	1	1	0	5.59	3
Ken Penner	5	0	1	0	2.84	3

== 1929 World Series ==
AL Philadelphia Athletics (4) vs. NL Chicago Cubs (1)

Game	Score	Date	Location	Attendance
1	Philadelphia Athletics – 3, Chicago Cubs – 1	October 8	Wrigley Field	50,740
2	Philadelphia Athletics – 9, Chicago Cubs – 3	October 9	Wrigley Field	49,987
3	Chicago Cubs – 3, Philadelphia Athletics – 1	October 11	Shibe Park	29,921
4	Chicago Cubs – 8, Philadelphia Athletics – 10	October 12	Shibe Park	29,921
5	Chicago Cubs – 2, Philadelphia Athletics – 3	October 14	Shibe Park	29,921

== Awards and honors ==
=== Records ===
- Rogers Hornsby, National League record, Most runs by a second baseman, (156).

== Farm system ==
Level	Team	League	Manager
AA	Los Angeles Angels	Pacific Coast League	Marty Krug and Jack Lelivelt
