= Carmen Hill =

American baseball player (1895–1990)

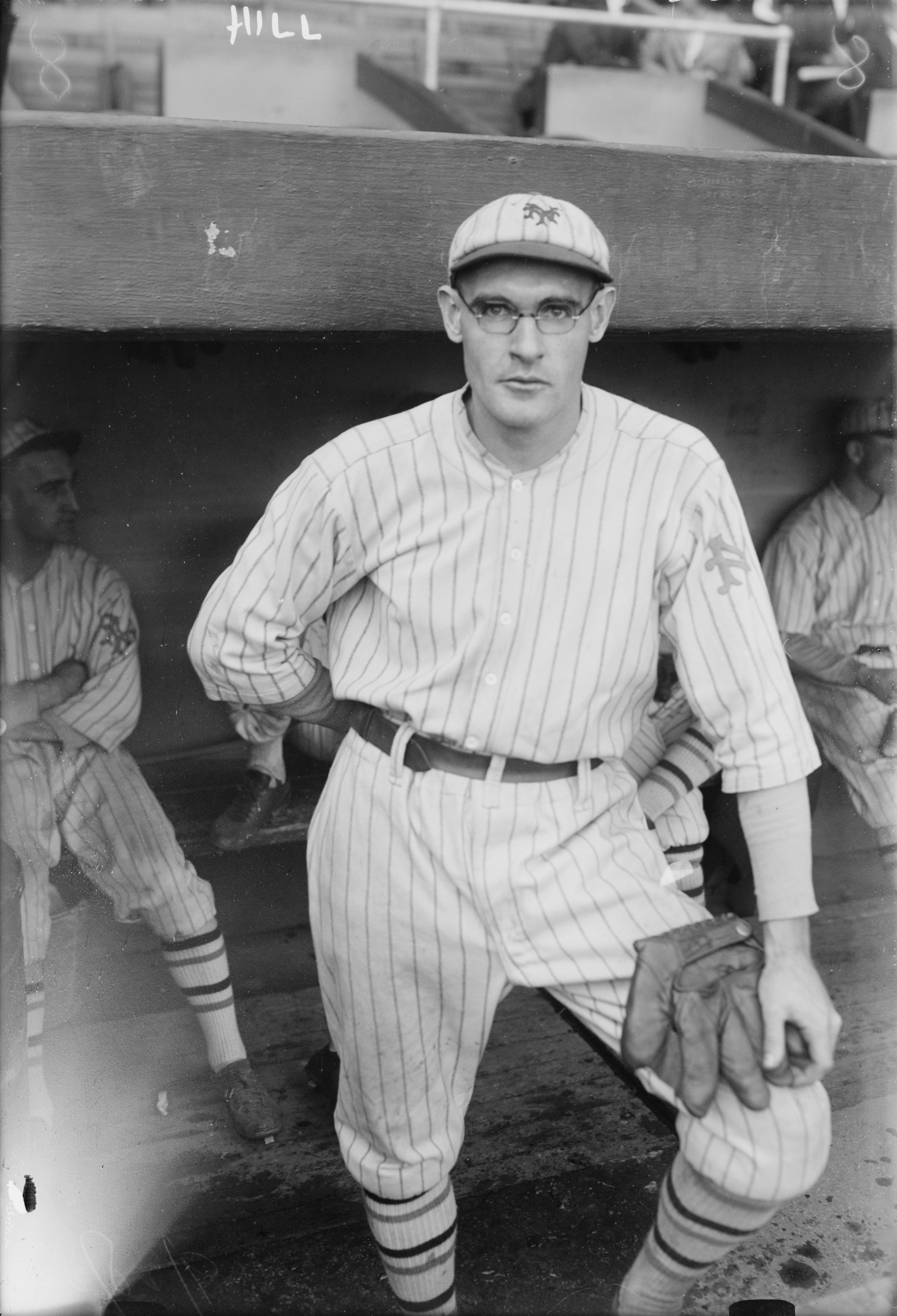
- Hill in 1922, with the New York Giants
- Pitcher
- Born: October 1, 1895; Royalton, Minnesota, U.S.
- Died: January 1, 1990 (aged 94); Indianapolis, Indiana, U.S.
- Batted: Right Threw: Right

MLB debut
- August 24, 1915, for the Pittsburgh Pirates

Last MLB appearance
- May 3, 1930, for the St. Louis Cardinals

MLB statistics
- Win–loss record: 49–33
- Earned run average: 3.44
- Strikeouts: 264
- Stats at Baseball Reference

Teams
- Pittsburgh Pirates (1915–1916, 1918–1919); New York Giants (1922); Pittsburgh Pirates (1926–1929); St. Louis Cardinals (1929–1930)

Carmen Proctor Hill (October 1, 1895 – January 1, 1990) was an American professional baseball player. He was a Major League Baseball (MLB) pitcher for the Pittsburgh Pirates (1915–16, 1918–1919 and 1926–1919), New York Giants (1922) and St. Louis Cardinals (1929–1930).

Hill helped the Giants win the 1922 World Series, the Pirates win the 1927 National League (NL) pennant, and the Cardinals win the 1930 NL pennant. He finished 23rd in voting for the 1927 National League MVP for having a 22–11 win–loss record, 43 games, 31 games started, 22 complete games, 2 shutouts, 7 games finished, 3 saves, 277 2/3 innings pitched, 260 hits allowed, 100 earned runs, 80 walks, 95 strikeouts, and a 3.24 ERA.

In 10 seasons he had a 49–33 win–loss record, 147 games, 85 games started, 47 complete games, 5 shutouts, 34 games finished, 8 saves, 787 innings pitched, 769 hits allowed, 301 earned runs allowed, 38 home runs allowed, 267 walks, 264 strikeouts, and a 3.44 ERA. In addition, Hill won 202 minor league games over 14 seasons with 7 teams.

Hill was a screwball pitcher.

Hill died in Indianapolis at the age of 94.
