= Kent Greenfield (baseball) =

American baseball player (1902–1978)

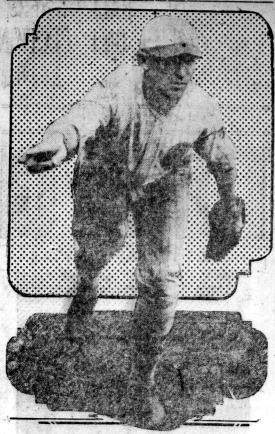
- Pitcher
- Born: July 1, 1902; Guthrie, Kentucky, U.S.
- Died: March 14, 1978 (aged 75); Guthrie, Kentucky, U.S.
- Batted: Right Threw: Right

MLB debut
- September 28, 1924, for the New York Giants

Last MLB appearance
- September 6, 1929, for the Brooklyn Robins

MLB statistics
- Win–loss record: 41–48
- Earned run average: 4.54
- Strikeouts: 242
- Stats at Baseball Reference

Teams
- New York Giants (1924–1927); Boston Braves (1927–1929); Brooklyn Robins (1929)

Kent Greenfield (July 1, 1902 – March 14, 1978) was an American pitcher in Major League Baseball for six seasons, from 1924 to 1929. Greenfield was born in Guthrie, Kentucky, and was a childhood friend of author Robert Penn Warren.
