= 1929 Major League Baseball season =

1929 MLB season
- League: American League (AL); National League (NL)
- Sport: Baseball
- Duration: Regular season: April 16 – October 6, 1929; World Series: October 8–14, 1929
- Games: 154
- Teams: 16 (8 per league)

Regular Season
- Season MVP: NL: Rogers Hornsby (CHC)
- AL champions: Philadelphia Athletics
- AL runners-up: New York Yankees
- NL champions: Chicago Cubs
- NL runners-up: Pittsburgh Pirates

World Series
- Champions: Philadelphia Athletics
- Runners-up: Chicago Cubs

MLB seasons
- ← 1928 1930 →

Locations of teams for the 1923–1931 American League seasons
American League
Locations of teams for the 1920–1931 National League seasons
National League

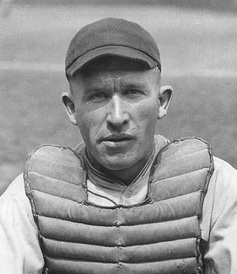
American Baseball Player Zack Taylor - 1929

The 1929 major league baseball season began on April 16, 1929. The regular season ended on October 6, with the Chicago Cubs and Philadelphia Athletics as the regular season champions of the National League and American League, respectively. The postseason began with Game 1 of the 26th World Series on October 8 and ended with Game 5 on October 14. In the second iteration of this World Series matchup, the Athletics defeated the Cubs, four games to one, capturing their fourth championship in franchise history, since their previous in 1913. Going into the season, the defending World Series champions were the New York Yankees from the 1928 season.

This was the last of eight seasons that "League Awards", a precursor to the Major League Baseball Most Valuable Player Award (introduced in 1931), were issued. Only a National League award was given in 1929.

== Schedule ==
The 1929 schedule consisted of 154 games for all teams in the American League and National League, each of which had eight teams. Each team was scheduled to play 22 games against the other seven teams of their respective league. This continued the format put in place since the 1904 season (except for 1919) and would be used until 1961 in the American League and 1962 in the National League.

Opening Day took place on April 16 and saw eight teams across both leagues play. The final day of the regular season was on October 6. The World Series took place between October 8 and October 14.

== Rule changes ==
The 1929 season saw the following rule changes:

- For all ballparks, foul poles must be constructed to be at least 25 feet above the outer barrier, to aid umpires in calling balls fair or foul. The poles were to be constructed either on top of the grandstand roof, or the outer fence of the ballpark. This was coupled with the home run rule, the interpretation of which follows the early-1920 rule, which states that balls are to be called based on where the ball crosses the outfield fence. This rule now accounts for all balls which leave the ballpark, including those which completely leave the ballpark. The American League would implement this home run rule in 1931.
- The American League implements the ground rule double rule, which states that balls that bounce over the fence entitle the batter to two bases. The rule would be implemented by the National League in 1931.
- The Cleveland Indians and the New York Yankees are the first teams to make uniform numbers on the back of the jersey permanent. In the past teams, such as the St Louis Cardinals and the Cleveland Indians, had experimented with numbers before, but only on the sleeves and only for a few weeks.
- A rule change ended the practice of minor-league teams selling a star prospect to a friendly major-league club for a high price, having the player returned at a later date and then, when it put him back on the open market, forcing another big-league club to pay the already established price.
- The signing of any player under the age of 17 was banned.
- A price tag of $7,500 (equivalent to $140,625 in 2025) on any first-year player was implemented.

== Teams ==
An asterisk (*) denotes the ballpark a team played the minority of their home games at

League	Team	City	Ballpark	Capacity	Manager
American League	Boston Red Sox	Boston, Massachusetts	Fenway Park	27,000	Bill Carrigan
American League	Boston Red Sox	Boston, Massachusetts	Braves Field*	46,500*	Bill Carrigan
American League	Chicago White Sox	Chicago, Illinois	Comiskey Park	52,000	Lena Blackburne
American League	Cleveland Indians	Cleveland, Ohio	Dunn Field	21,414	Roger Peckinpaugh
American League	Detroit Tigers	Detroit, Michigan	Navin Field	30,000	Bucky Harris
American League	New York Yankees	New York, New York	Yankee Stadium	62,000	Miller Huggins
American League	New York Yankees	New York, New York	Yankee Stadium	62,000	Art Fletcher
American League	Philadelphia Athletics	Philadelphia, Pennsylvania	Shibe Park	30,000	Connie Mack
American League	St. Louis Browns	St. Louis, Missouri	Sportsman's Park	34,023	Dan Howley
American League	Washington Senators	Washington, D.C.	Griffith Stadium	27,000	Walter Johnson
National League	Boston Braves	Boston, Massachusetts	Braves Field	46,500	Emil Fuchs
National League	Brooklyn Robins	New York, New York	Ebbets Field	28,000	Wilbert Robinson
National League	Chicago Cubs	Chicago, Illinois	Wrigley Field	40,000	Joe McCarthy
National League	Cincinnati Reds	Cincinnati, Ohio	Redland Field	26,060	Jack Hendricks
National League	New York Giants	New York, New York	Polo Grounds	55,000	John McGraw
National League	Philadelphia Phillies	Philadelphia, Pennsylvania	Baker Bowl	20,000	Burt Shotton
National League	Pittsburgh Pirates	Pittsburgh, Pennsylvania	Forbes Field	41,000	Donie Bush
National League	Pittsburgh Pirates	Pittsburgh, Pennsylvania	Forbes Field	41,000	Jewel Ens
National League	St. Louis Cardinals	St. Louis, Missouri	Sportsman's Park	34,023	Billy Southworth
National League	St. Louis Cardinals	St. Louis, Missouri	Sportsman's Park	34,023	Gabby Street
National League	St. Louis Cardinals	St. Louis, Missouri	Sportsman's Park	34,023	Bill McKechnie

== Standings ==
=== American League ===
American League
Team	W	L	Pct.	GB	Home	Road
Philadelphia Athletics	104	46	.693	—	57‍–‍16	47‍–‍30
New York Yankees	88	66	.571	18	49‍–‍28	39‍–‍38
Cleveland Indians	81	71	.533	24	44‍–‍32	37‍–‍39
St. Louis Browns	79	73	.520	26	41‍–‍36	38‍–‍37
Washington Senators	71	81	.467	34	37‍–‍40	34‍–‍41
Detroit Tigers	70	84	.455	36	38‍–‍39	32‍–‍45
Chicago White Sox	59	93	.388	46	35‍–‍41	24‍–‍52
Boston Red Sox	58	96	.377	48	32‍–‍45	26‍–‍51

=== National League ===
National League
Team	W	L	Pct.	GB	Home	Road
Chicago Cubs	98	54	.645	—	52‍–‍25	46‍–‍29
Pittsburgh Pirates	88	65	.575	10½	45‍–‍31	43‍–‍34
New York Giants	84	67	.556	13½	39‍–‍37	45‍–‍30
St. Louis Cardinals	78	74	.513	20	43‍–‍32	35‍–‍42
Philadelphia Phillies	71	82	.464	27½	39‍–‍37	32‍–‍45
Brooklyn Robins	70	83	.458	28½	42‍–‍35	28‍–‍48
Cincinnati Reds	66	88	.429	33	38‍–‍39	28‍–‍49
Boston Braves	56	98	.364	43	34‍–‍43	22‍–‍55

=== Tie games ===
8 tie games (3 in AL, 5 in NL), which are not factored into winning percentage or games behind (and were often replayed again) occurred throughout the season.

==== American League ====
- Boston Red Sox, 1
- Detroit Tigers, 1
- Philadelphia Athletics, 1
- St. Louis Browns, 2
- Washington Senators, 1

==== National League ====
- Chicago Cubs, 4
- Cincinnati Reds, 1
- New York Giants, 1
- Philadelphia Phillies, 1
- Pittsburgh Pirates, 1
- St. Louis Cardinals, 2

== Postseason ==
The postseason began on October 8 and ended on October 14 with the Philadelphia Athletics defeating the Chicago Cubs in the 1929 World Series in five games.

=== Bracket ===
World Series
AL	Philadelphia Athletics	4
NL	Chicago Cubs	1

== Managerial changes ==
=== Off-season ===
Team	Former Manager	New Manager
Boston Braves	Rogers Hornsby	Emil Fuchs
Detroit Tigers	George Moriarty	Bucky Harris
St. Louis Cardinals	Bill McKechnie	Billy Southworth
Washington Senators	Bucky Harris	Walter Johnson

=== In-season ===
Team	Former Manager	New Manager
New York Yankees	Miller Huggins	Art Fletcher
Pittsburgh Pirates	Donie Bush	Jewel Ens
St. Louis Cardinals	Billy Southworth	Gabby Street
St. Louis Cardinals	Gabby Street	Bill McKechnie

== League leaders ==
=== American League ===
Hitting leaders
Stat	Player	Total
AVG	Lew Fonseca (CLE)	.369
OPS	Babe Ruth (NYY)	1.128
HR	Babe Ruth (NYY)	46
RBI	Al Simmons (PHA)	157
R	Charlie Gehringer (DET)	131
H	Dale Alexander (DET); Charlie Gehringer (DET)	215
SB	Charlie Gehringer (DET)	27

Pitching leaders
Stat	Player	Total
W	George Earnshaw (PHA)	24
L	Red Ruffing (BOS)	22
ERA	Lefty Grove (PHA)	2.81
K	Lefty Grove (PHA)	170
IP	Sam Gray (SLB)	305.0
SV	Firpo Marberry (WSH); Wilcy Moore (NYY)	9
WHIP	Firpo Marberry (WSH)	1.206

=== National League ===
Hitting leaders
Stat	Player	Total
AVG	Lefty O'Doul (PHI)	.398
OPS	Rogers Hornsby (CHC)	1.139
HR	Chuck Klein (PHI)	43
RBI	Hack Wilson (CHC)	159
R	Rogers Hornsby (CHC)	156
H	Lefty O'Doul (PHI)	254
SB	Kiki Cuyler (CHC)	43

Pitching leaders
Stat	Player	Total
W	Pat Malone (CHC)	22
L	Watson Clark (BRO)	19
ERA	Bill Walker (NYG)	3.09
K	Pat Malone (CHC)	166
IP	Watson Clark (BRO)	279.0
SV	Guy Bush (CHC); Johnny Morrison (BRO)	8
WHIP	Red Lucas (CIN)	1.204

== Milestones ==
=== Batters ===
==== Cycles ====
- Mel Ott (NYG):
  - Ott hit for his first cycle and ninth in franchise history, in game two of a doubleheader on May 16 against the Boston Braves.
- Ski Melillo (SLB):
  - Melillo hit for his first cycle and fourth in franchise history, in game two of a doubleheader on May 23 against the Cleveland Indians.
- Joe Cronin (WSH):
  - Cronin hit for his first cycle and third in franchise history, in game one of a doubleheader on September 2 against the Boston Red Sox.

==== Other batting accomplishments ====
- Babe Ruth (NYY):
  - Became the first player in Major League history to hit 500 home runs in the second inning against the Cleveland Indians on August 11.

=== Pitchers ===
==== No-hitters ====
- Carl Hubbell (NYG):
  - Hubbell threw his first career no-hitter and the eighth no-hitter in franchise history, by defeating the Pittsburgh Pirates 11–0 on May 8. Hubbell walked one and struck out four.

=== Miscellaneous ===
- New York Giants:
  - Set a major league record for most runs scored in the 14th inning, by scoring eight runs against the Pittsburgh Pirates on June 15.
- Chicago Cubs / Philadelphia Athletics:
  - For the first time since 1912, that both pennant winners won by more than 10 games.
- Philadelphia Athletics:
  - On October 12, Game 4 of the World Series featured a historic 10-run rally by the Athletics in the seventh inning to comeback from a 8–0 deficit, nicknamed "The Mack Attack," after the team's manager, Connie Mack. He commented that it was "The greatest thrill [he] had in 29 years of managing." At the time, this was a record.

== Awards and honors ==
- League Award: Rogers Hornsby (CHC)
- The Sporting News Most Valuable Player Award: Al Simmons (PHA)

== Home field attendance ==
Team name	Wins	%±	Home attendance	%±	Per game
Chicago Cubs	98	7.7%	1,485,166	29.9%	19,041
New York Yankees	88	−12.9%	960,148	−10.4%	12,469
Detroit Tigers	70	2.9%	869,318	83.3%	11,290
New York Giants	84	−9.7%	868,806	−5.2%	11,283
Philadelphia Athletics	104	6.1%	839,176	21.7%	11,340
Brooklyn Robins	70	−9.1%	731,886	10.1%	9,505
Cleveland Indians	81	30.6%	536,210	42.6%	7,055
Pittsburgh Pirates	88	3.5%	491,377	−0.7%	6,465
Chicago White Sox	59	−18.1%	426,795	−13.6%	5,616
St. Louis Cardinals	78	−17.9%	399,887	−47.5%	5,193
Boston Red Sox	58	1.8%	394,620	−0.6%	5,059
Boston Braves	56	12.0%	372,351	64.0%	4,836
Washington Senators	71	−5.3%	355,506	−6.1%	4,558
Cincinnati Reds	66	−15.4%	295,040	−39.8%	3,783
Philadelphia Phillies	71	65.1%	281,200	54.4%	3,700
St. Louis Browns	79	−3.7%	280,697	−17.3%	3,645

== Venues ==
Across 78 homes games, the Boston Red Sox played their Monday, September 2 doubleheader against the Washington Senators, as well as all 15 of their Sunday games at the Boston Braves home field of Braves Field (the remaining 61 home games were played at Fenway Park). This was the 1st of three consecutive seasons playing all Sunday games at Braves Field and 1st of four consecutive season playing some games at Braves Field.

== See also ==
- 1929 in baseball (Events, Births, Deaths)
