= 1930 Pittsburgh Pirates season =

1930 Pittsburgh Pirates
- League: National League
- Ballpark: Forbes Field
- City: Pittsburgh, Pennsylvania
- Owners: Barney Dreyfuss
- Managers: Jewel Ens

The 1930 Pittsburgh Pirates season was the 49th season of the Pittsburgh Pirates franchise; the 44th in the National League. The Pirates finished fifth in the league standings with a record of 80–74.

== Regular season ==
=== Season standings ===
National League
Team	W	L	Pct.	GB	Home	Road
St. Louis Cardinals	92	62	.597	—	53‍–‍24	39‍–‍38
Chicago Cubs	90	64	.584	2	51‍–‍26	39‍–‍38
New York Giants	87	67	.565	5	46‍–‍31	41‍–‍36
Brooklyn Robins	86	68	.558	6	49‍–‍28	37‍–‍40
Pittsburgh Pirates	80	74	.519	12	42‍–‍35	38‍–‍39
Boston Braves	70	84	.455	22	39‍–‍38	31‍–‍46
Cincinnati Reds	59	95	.383	33	37‍–‍40	22‍–‍55
Philadelphia Phillies	52	102	.338	40	35‍–‍42	17‍–‍60

=== Record vs. opponents ===
1930 National League record Sources:
Team	BSN	BRO	CHC	CIN	NYG	PHI	PIT	STL
Boston	—	9–13	5–17	13–9	11–11	14–8	10–12	8–14
Brooklyn	13–9	—	8–14	13–9	13–9	15–7	13–9	11–11
Chicago	17–5	14–8	—	11–11	10–12	16–6–2	11–11	11–11
Cincinnati	9–13	9–13	11–11	—	7–15	12–10	8–14	3–19
New York	11–11	9–13	12–10	15–7	—	16–6	14–8	10–12
Philadelphia	8–14	7–15	6–16–2	10–12	6–16	—	9–13	6–16
Pittsburgh	12–10	9–13	11–11	14–8	8–14	13–9	—	13–9
St. Louis	14–8	11–11	11–11	19–3	12–10	16–6	9–13	—

=== Game log ===
1930 Game Log: 80–74 (Home: 42–35; Away: 38–39)
April: 9–3 (Home: 2–0; Away: 7–3)

#	Date	Opponent	Score	Win	Loss	Save	Attendance	Record
1	April 15	@ Reds	7–6	**Swetonic** (1–0)	Lucas	—	30,112	1–0
2	April 16	@ Reds	1–3	Donohue	**Brame** (0–1)	—	4,412	1–1
3	April 17	@ Reds	7–1	**French** (1–0)	Rixey	—	—	2–1
4	April 18	@ Reds	5–3	**Petty** (1–0)	May	**Swetonic** (1)	—	3–1
5	April 19	@ Cardinals	5–4 (10)	**Kremer** (1–0)	Sherdel	—	—	4–1
6	April 21	@ Cardinals	6–4	**Brame** (1–1)	Hill	—	—	5–1
7	April 25	Cardinals	6–1	**Kremer** (2–0)	Sherdel	—	—	6–1
8	April 26	Cardinals	9–7	**Brame** (2–1)	Hallahan	—	—	7–1
9	April 27	@ Cubs	9–5	**French** (2–0)	Bush	**Swetonic** (2)	—	8–1
10	April 28	@ Cubs	4–7	Root	**Spencer** (0–1)	—	—	8–2
11	April 29	@ Cubs	13–9	**Erickson** (1–0)	Blake	**Swetonic** (3)	—	9–2
12	April 30	@ Cubs	2–5	Malone	**Jones** (0–1)	—	—	9–3

May: 11–15 (Home: 8–13; Away: 3–2)

#	Date	Opponent	Score	Win	Loss	Save	Attendance	Record
13	May 1	Braves	3–4	Seibold	**French** (2–1)	—	—	9–4
14	May 2	Braves	3–2	**Kremer** (3–0)	Cantwell	**Petty** (1)	—	10–4
15	May 3	Braves	7–12	Cunningham	**Swetonic** (1–1)	—	—	10–5
16	May 5	Giants	1–9	Walker	**French** (2–2)	—	5,000	10–6
17	May 6	Giants	9–11	Hubbell	**Kremer** (3–1)	Heving	—	10–7
18	May 7	Giants	16–8	**Swetonic** (2–1)	Parmelee	—	—	11–7
19	May 8	Giants	10–13 (10)	Walker	**French** (2–3)	—	—	11–8
20	May 9	Robins	4–7	Clark	**Petty** (1–1)	Dudley	—	11–9
21	May 10	Robins	0–7	Elliott	**Kremer** (3–2)	—	11,000	11–10
22	May 11	@ Robins	2–10	Vance	**French** (2–4)	—	26,000	11–11
23	May 12	Robins	6–2	**Brame** (3–1)	Dudley	—	2,000	12–11
24	May 13	Phillies	8–14	Benge	**Petty** (1–2)	—	—	12–12
25	May 17	Reds	7–5	**Kremer** (4–2)	Donohue	**Swetonic** (4)	—	13–12
26	May 18	@ Reds	2–1	**Brame** (4–1)	Frey	—	—	14–12
27	May 20	@ Reds	5–0	**French** (3–4)	Lucas	—	—	15–12
28	May 21	Cubs	10–3	**Kremer** (5–2)	Teachout	**Meine** (1)	—	16–12
29	May 22	Cubs	5–12	Osborn	**Petty** (1–3)	Moss	—	16–13
30	May 23	Cubs	7–6	**Meine** (1–0)	Carlson	**Spencer** (1)	—	17–13
31	May 24	Cubs	3–5	Malone	**French** (3–5)	—	—	17–14
32	May 25	@ Reds	6–5 (10)	**Spencer** (1–1)	Kolp	—	—	18–14
33	May 25	@ Reds	3–4	Lucas	**Chagnon** (0–1)	—	—	18–15
34	May 26	Cardinals	4–10	Sherdel	**Petty** (1–4)	Lindsey	—	18–16
35	May 27	Cardinals	8–5	**French** (4–5)	Grabowski	—	—	19–16
36	May 30	Reds	1–9	Lucas	**Chagnon** (0–2)	—	—	19–17
37	May 30	Reds	7–6	**Kremer** (6–2)	Benton	**Spencer** (2)	—	20–17
38	May 31	Reds	4–10	Rixey	**French** (4–6)	Kolp	—	20–18

June: 10–16 (Home: 6–5; Away: 4–11)

#	Date	Opponent	Score	Win	Loss	Save	Attendance	Record
39	June 1	@ Cubs	4–16	Bush	**Meine** (1–1)	—	—	20–19
40	June 3	@ Robins	5–6	Clark	**Spencer** (1–2)	—	18,000	20–20
41	June 4	@ Robins	12–6	**French** (5–6)	Dudley	—	—	21–20
42	June 5	@ Robins	5–6	Elliott	**Petty** (1–5)	Luque	—	21–21
43	June 6	@ Braves	4–3	**Meine** (2–1)	Cantwell	—	—	22–21
44	June 7	@ Braves	4–6	Zachary	**Kremer** (6–3)	—	—	22–22
45	June 8	@ Braves	6–10	Seibold	**French** (5–7)	—	—	22–23
46	June 11	@ Giants	2–9	Hubbell	**Meine** (2–2)	—	—	22–24
47	June 12	@ Giants	10–7	**Kremer** (7–3)	Fitzsimmons	—	—	23–24
48	June 13	@ Giants	2–7	Walker	**French** (5–8)	—	—	23–25
49	June 14	@ Phillies	19–12	**Spencer** (2–2)	Smythe	—	—	24–25
50	June 14	@ Phillies	4–5	Collins	**Petty** (1–6)	—	—	24–26
51	June 16	@ Phillies	14–18	Collard	**Kremer** (7–4)	Collins	—	24–27
52	June 17	@ Phillies	4–5 (10)	Nichols	**French** (5–9)	—	—	24–28
53	June 18	Giants	3–4	Walker	**Meine** (2–3)	Pruett	—	24–29
54	June 20	Giants	8–4	**Kremer** (8–4)	Fitzsimmons	—	—	25–29
55	June 21	Giants	5–6 (10)	Donohue	**Spencer** (2–3)	—	—	25–30
56	June 22	@ Robins	6–9	Luque	**French** (5–10)	—	—	25–31
57	June 23	Robins	6–19	Elliott	**Meine** (2–4)	—	—	25–32
58	June 25	Robins	5–1	**Kremer** (9–4)	Dudley	—	—	26–32
59	June 26	Phillies	1–0	**French** (6–10)	Collins	—	—	27–32
60	June 26	Phillies	11–5	**Brame** (5–1)	Collard	—	4,000	28–32
61	June 27	Phillies	6–4	**Meine** (3–4)	Willoughby	—	—	29–32
62	June 28	Phillies	6–3	**Spencer** (3–3)	Nichols	—	12,000	30–32
63	June 28	Phillies	4–6	Benge	**Chagnon** (0–3)	—	12,000	30–33
64	June 30	Braves	5–6	Cantwell	**Kremer** (9–5)	Seibold	2,000	30–34

July: 18–15 (Home: 7–4; Away: 11–11)

#	Date	Opponent	Score	Win	Loss	Save	Attendance	Record
65	July 1	Braves	8–3	**French** (7–10)	Brandt	—	—	31–34
66	July 2	Braves	4–6	Seibold	**Brame** (5–2)	—	—	31–35
67	July 3	Braves	0–8	Smith	**Spencer** (3–4)	—	—	31–36
68	July 4	Cubs	1–10	Teachout	**Meine** (3–5)	—	12,000	31–37
69	July 4	Cubs	5–1	**Kremer** (10–5)	Root	—	14,000	32–37
70	July 5	Cubs	3–12	Osborn	**French** (7–11)	—	—	32–38
71	July 6	@ Cardinals	1–2	Haines	**Spencer** (3–5)	—	—	32–39
72	July 6	@ Cardinals	4–12	Grimes	**Brame** (5–3)	—	—	32–40
73	July 7	@ Cardinals	9–5	**French** (8–11)	Haid	—	—	33–40
74	July 8	@ Cardinals	10–5	**Kremer** (11–5)	Rhem	—	—	34–40
75	July 9	@ Cardinals	6–7	Haid	**Meine** (3–6)	—	—	34–41
76	July 11	Cardinals	6–2	**Brame** (6–3)	Hallahan	—	—	35–41
77	July 12	Cardinals	3–2	**Kremer** (12–5)	Haines	—	—	36–41
78	July 13	@ Robins	1–0	**French** (9–11)	Elliott	—	18,000	37–41
79	July 14	@ Robins	8–12	Vance	**Spencer** (3–6)	—	—	37–42
80	July 15	@ Robins	0–5	Clark	**Brame** (6–4)	—	—	37–43
81	July 16	@ Braves	3–4	Zachary	**Kremer** (12–6)	—	—	37–44
82	July 16	@ Braves	9–5	**Meine** (4–6)	Sherdel	—	—	38–44
83	July 17	@ Braves	6–2	**French** (10–11)	Cantwell	—	—	39–44
84	July 18	@ Braves	12–4	**Spencer** (4–6)	Seibold	—	—	40–44
85	July 19	@ Braves	9–4	**Brame** (7–4)	Smith	—	—	41–44
86	July 21	@ Phillies	2–7	Sweetland	**Kremer** (12–7)	—	—	41–45
87	July 22	@ Phillies	5–11	Collins	**French** (10–12)	—	—	41–46
88	July 23	@ Phillies	2–1	**Meine** (5–6)	Hansen	—	—	42–46
89	July 23	@ Phillies	16–15 (13)	**French** (11–12)	Sweetland	—	—	43–46
90	July 24	@ Giants	0–1 (7)	Hubbell	**Kremer** (12–8)	—	—	43–47
91	July 25	@ Giants	1–3	Mitchell	**French** (11–13)	—	—	43–48
92	July 26	@ Giants	4–10	Fitzsimmons	**Brame** (7–5)	—	—	43–49
93	July 27	@ Giants	10–8	**Meine** (6–6)	Walker	**Swetonic** (5)	—	44–49
94	July 27	@ Giants	8–4	**Spencer** (5–6)	Donohue	—	—	45–49
95	July 29	Cardinals	6–5	**Kremer** (13–8)	Grabowski	—	—	46–49
96	July 30	Cardinals	6–5	**Brame** (8–5)	Haines	—	3,000	47–49
97	July 31	Cardinals	4–3	**French** (12–13)	Lindsey	—	—	48–49

August: 20–12 (Home: 16–7; Away: 4–5)

#	Date	Opponent	Score	Win	Loss	Save	Attendance	Record
98	August 1	@ Cubs	7–10	Osborn	**Spencer** (5–7)	—	30,000	48–50
99	August 2	@ Cubs	14–8	**Kremer** (14–8)	Bush	—	—	49–50
100	August 3	@ Cubs	12–8	**Brame** (9–5)	Root	—	—	50–50
101	August 6	Robins	4–7	Thurston	**French** (12–14)	Heimach	—	50–51
102	August 7	Robins	4–6	Vance	**Spencer** (5–8)	Clark	—	50–52
103	August 8	Giants	1–9	Walker	**Meine** (6–7)	—	—	50–53
104	August 8	Giants	2–7	Hubbell	**Brame** (9–6)	—	11,000	50–54
105	August 9	Giants	6–10	Pruett	**Kremer** (14–9)	—	7,000	50–55
106	August 11	Giants	8–5	**French** (13–14)	Chaplin	—	—	51–55
107	August 12	Phillies	8–7 (14)	**Swetonic** (3–1)	Elliott	—	—	52–55
108	August 12	Phillies	8–3	**Spencer** (6–8)	Sweetland	—	5,000	53–55
109	August 13	Phillies	8–4	**Kremer** (15–9)	Collard	—	—	54–55
110	August 15	Phillies	5–7	Collins	**Meine** (6–8)	—	—	54–56
111	August 15	Phillies	3–2 (10)	**Swetonic** (4–1)	Sweetland	—	—	55–56
112	August 16	Robins	5–7	Moss	**Wood** (0–1)	Clark	—	55–57
113	August 16	Robins	6–2	**Kremer** (16–9)	Thurston	—	—	56–57
114	August 17	@ Robins	0–5	Vance	**French** (13–15)	—	18,000	56–58
115	August 18	Robins	4–3	**Brame** (10–6)	Clark	—	—	57–58
116	August 19	Robins	8–0	**Swetonic** (5–1)	Phelps	—	—	58–58
117	August 20	Braves	5–0	**Kremer** (17–9)	Seibold	—	—	59–58
118	August 22	Braves	10–3	**French** (14–15)	Zachary	—	—	60–58
119	August 23	Braves	5–0	**Wood** (1–1)	Smith	—	—	61–58
120	August 23	Braves	2–1	**Brame** (11–6)	Cantwell	—	—	62–58
121	August 24	@ Reds	9–6	**Kremer** (18–9)	Frey	—	—	63–58
122	August 24	@ Reds	0–2	Kolp	**Swetonic** (5–2)	—	9,000	63–59
123	August 26	@ Cubs	5–7	Blake	**French** (14–16)	—	25,000	63–60
124	August 27	@ Cubs	10–8	**Brame** (12–6)	Root	—	—	64–60
125	August 28	Reds	16–12	**Kremer** (19–9)	Lucas	**Spencer** (3)	—	65–60
126	August 28	Reds	11–2	**Swetonic** (6–2)	Frey	—	—	66–60
127	August 30	Reds	5–0	**Wood** (2–1)	Kolp	—	—	67–60
128	August 30	Reds	3–2	**French** (15–16)	Benton	—	—	68–60
129	August 31	@ Reds	1–4	Rixey	**Brame** (12–7)	—	—	68–61

September: 12–13 (Home: 3–6; Away: 9–7)

#	Date	Opponent	Score	Win	Loss	Save	Attendance	Record
130	September 1	Cardinals	6–11	Rhem	**Swetonic** (6–3)	—	8,000	68–62
131	September 1	Cardinals	1–5	Grimes	**Kremer** (19–10)	—	12,000	68–63
132	September 3	Cubs	9–6	**Spencer** (7–8)	Blake	**Swetonic** (6)	5,000	69–63
133	September 4	Cubs	7–10 (10)	Petty	**Swetonic** (6–4)	Malone	—	69–64
134	September 5	Cubs	8–7	**Brame** (13–7)	Osborn	—	—	70–64
135	September 6	Cubs	14–19	Bush	**Swetonic** (6–5)	Petty	—	70–65
136	September 7	@ Cubs	9–7	**Brame** (14–7)	Bush	—	35,000	71–65
137	September 10	@ Braves	0–5	Zachary	**Kremer** (19–11)	—	—	71–66
138	September 11	@ Braves	5–2	**Brame** (15–7)	Sherdel	—	—	72–66
139	September 12	@ Braves	4–5 (10)	Frankhouse	**French** (15–17)	—	—	72–67
140	September 14	@ Giants	8–6 (10)	**Spencer** (8–8)	Heving	—	—	73–67
141	September 14	@ Giants	7–3 (7)	**Wood** (3–1)	Walker	**French** (1)	30,000	74–67
142	September 15	@ Giants	1–6	Fitzsimmons	**Swetonic** (6–6)	—	3,000	74–68
143	September 16	@ Phillies	14–15 (10)	Collins	**Wood** (3–2)	—	—	74–69
144	September 17	@ Phillies	12–5	**Brame** (16–7)	Collard	—	—	75–69
145	September 18	@ Phillies	6–5	**Kremer** (20–11)	Milligan	—	—	76–69
146	September 20	@ Robins	6–2	**French** (16–17)	Elliott	**Spencer** (4)	—	77–69
147	September 21	@ Robins	7–6	**Brame** (17–7)	Clark	—	—	78–69
148	September 23	Reds	0–8	May	**Spencer** (8–9)	—	—	78–70
149	September 23	Reds	2–5	Ash	**Wood** (3–3)	—	—	78–71
150	September 24	Reds	5–1 (6)	**French** (17–17)	Carroll	—	—	79–71
151	September 25	@ Cardinals	0–9	Grimes	**Kremer** (20–12)	—	20,000	79–72
152	September 26	@ Cardinals	5–10	Haines	**Brame** (17–8)	—	10,000	79–73
153	September 27	@ Cardinals	11–8	**Wood** (4–3)	Kaufmann	—	—	80–73
154	September 28	@ Cardinals	1–3	Dean	**French** (17–18)	—	—	80–74

Legend: = Win = Loss
Bold = Pirates team member

=== Opening Day lineup ===
- Brickell-CF
- Grantham-2B
- Waner-RF
- Comorosky-LF
- Suhr-1B
- Bartell-SS
- Hemsley-C
- Engle-3B
- Kremer-P

=== Roster ===
1930 Pittsburgh Pirates
**Roster**
**Pitchers**: Andy Bednar; Erv Brame; Leon Chagnon; Ralph Erickson; Larry French; Percy Jones; Ray Kremer; Marty Lang; Heinie Meine; Jesse Petty; Glenn Spencer; Lil Stoner; Steve Swetonic; Bernie Walter; Spades Wood	**Catchers**: Al Bool; Charlie Hargreaves; Rollie Hemsley; **Infielders**: Dick Bartell; Stu Clarke; Charlie Engle; George Grantham; Howdy Groskloss; Ben Sankey; Gus Suhr; Pie Traynor	**Outfielders**: Fred Brickell; Adam Comorosky; Gus Dugas; Ira Flagstead; Jim Mosolf; Denny Sothern; Lloyd Waner; Paul Waner	**Manager**: Jewel Ens; **Coaches**: Max Carey; Oscar Stanage

== Player stats ==
=== Batting ===
==== Starters by position ====
Note: Pos = Position; G = Games played; AB = At bats; H = Hits; Avg. = Batting average; HR = Home runs; RBI = Runs batted in

Pos	Player	G	AB	H	Avg.	HR	RBI
C	Rollie Hemsley	104	324	82	.253	2	45
1B	Gus Suhr	151	542	155	.286	17	107
2B	George Grantham	146	552	179	.324	18	99
SS	Dick Bartell	129	475	152	.320	4	75
3B	Pie Traynor	130	497	182	.366	9	119
OF	Lloyd Waner	68	260	94	.362	1	36
OF	Paul Waner	145	589	217	.368	8	77
OF	Adam Comorosky	152	597	187	.313	12	119

==== Other batters ====
Note: G = Games played; AB = At bats; H = Hits; Avg. = Batting average; HR = Home runs; RBI = Runs batted in

Player	G	AB	H	Avg.	HR	RBI
Fred Brickell	68	219	65	.297	1	14
Charlie Engle	67	216	57	.264	0	15
Al Bool	78	216	56	.259	7	46
Ira Flagstead	44	156	39	.250	2	21
Jim Mosolf	40	51	17	.333	0	9
Denny Sothern	17	51	9	.176	1	4
Gus Dugas	9	31	9	.290	0	1
Charlie Hargreaves	11	31	7	.226	0	2
Ben Sankey	13	30	5	.167	0	0
Stu Clarke	4	9	4	.444	0	2
Howdy Groskloss	2	3	1	.333	0	1

=== Pitching ===
==== Starting pitchers ====
Note: G = Games pitched; IP = Innings pitched; W = Wins; L = Losses; ERA = Earned run average; SO = Strikeouts

Player	G	IP	W	L	ERA	SO
Ray Kremer	39	276.0	20	12	5.02	58
Larry French	42	274.2	17	18	4.36	90
Erv Brame	32	235.2	17	8	4.70	55
Heinie Meine	20	117.1	6	8	6.14	18
Spades Wood	9	58.0	4	3	5.12	23

==== Other pitchers ====
Note: G = Games pitched; IP = Innings pitched; W = Wins; L = Losses; ERA = Earned run average; SO = Strikeouts

Player	G	IP	W	L	ERA	SO
Glenn Spencer	41	156.2	8	9	5.40	60
Steve Swetonic	23	96.2	6	6	4.47	35
Leon Chagnon	18	62.0	0	3	6.82	27
Jesse Petty	10	41.1	1	6	8.27	16
Percy Jones	9	19.0	0	1	6.63	3

==== Relief pitchers ====
Note: G = Games pitched; W = Wins; L = Losses; SV = Saves; ERA = Earned run average; SO = Strikeouts

Player	G	W	L	SV	ERA	SO
Ralph Erickson	7	1	0	0	7.07	2
Lil Stoner	5	0	0	0	4.76	1
Marty Lang	2	0	0	0	54.00	2
Andy Bednar	2	0	0	0	27.00	1
Bernie Walter	1	0	0	0	0.00	1
Jim Mosolf	1	0	0	0	27.00	1

== Farm system ==
Level	Team	League	Manager
A	Wichita Aviators	Western League	Art Griggs
B	Columbia Comers	Sally League	Marty Fiedler and Lee Stebbins

LEAGUE CHAMPIONS: Wichita Aviators
