= 1930 Boston Braves season =

1930 Boston Braves
- League: National League
- Ballpark: Braves Field
- City: Boston, Massachusetts
- Record: 70–84 (.455)
- League place: 6th
- Owners: Emil Fuchs
- Managers: Bill McKechnie
- Radio: WNAC (Fred Hoey)

The 1930 Boston Braves season was the 60th season of the franchise.

== Offseason ==
- February 18, 1930: Owen Kahn was purchased by the Braves from the Manchester Blue Sox.

== Regular season ==
=== Season standings ===
National League
Team	W	L	Pct.	GB	Home	Road
St. Louis Cardinals	92	62	.597	—	53‍–‍24	39‍–‍38
Chicago Cubs	90	64	.584	2	51‍–‍26	39‍–‍38
New York Giants	87	67	.565	5	46‍–‍31	41‍–‍36
Brooklyn Robins	86	68	.558	6	49‍–‍28	37‍–‍40
Pittsburgh Pirates	80	74	.519	12	42‍–‍35	38‍–‍39
Boston Braves	70	84	.455	22	39‍–‍38	31‍–‍46
Cincinnati Reds	59	95	.383	33	37‍–‍40	22‍–‍55
Philadelphia Phillies	52	102	.338	40	35‍–‍42	17‍–‍60

=== Record vs. opponents ===
1930 National League record Sources:
Team	BSN	BRO	CHC	CIN	NYG	PHI	PIT	STL
Boston	—	9–13	5–17	13–9	11–11	14–8	10–12	8–14
Brooklyn	13–9	—	8–14	13–9	13–9	15–7	13–9	11–11
Chicago	17–5	14–8	—	11–11	10–12	16–6–2	11–11	11–11
Cincinnati	9–13	9–13	11–11	—	7–15	12–10	8–14	3–19
New York	11–11	9–13	12–10	15–7	—	16–6	14–8	10–12
Philadelphia	8–14	7–15	6–16–2	10–12	6–16	—	9–13	6–16
Pittsburgh	12–10	9–13	11–11	14–8	8–14	13–9	—	13–9
St. Louis	14–8	11–11	11–11	19–3	12–10	16–6	9–13	—

=== Notable transactions ===
- June 9, 1930: Owen Kahn was sold by the Braves to the Pittsfield Hillies.

=== Roster ===
1930 Boston Braves
Roster
Pitchers: Ed Brandt; Bob Brown; Ben Cantwell; Johnny Cooney; Bruce Cunningham; Fred Frankhouse; Burleigh Grimes; Ken Jones; Socks Seibold; Bill Sherdel; Bob Smith; Tom Zachary	Catchers: Bill Cronin; Hank Gowdy; Al Spohrer; Infielders: Buster Chatham; Bernie James; Freddie Maguire; Rabbit Maranville; Johnny Neun; Billy Rhiel; Gene Robertson; Red Rollings; George Sisler	Outfielders: Wally Berger; Buzz Boyle; Earl Clark; Bill Dunlap; Randy Moore; Lance Richbourg; Jimmy Welsh; Other batters: Owen Kahn	Manager: Bill McKechnie; Coaches: Hank Gowdy; George Sisler

== Player stats ==
=== Batting ===
==== Starters by position ====
Note: Pos = Position; G = Games played; AB = At bats; H = Hits; Avg. = Batting average; HR = Home runs; RBI = Runs batted in

Pos	Player	G	AB	H	Avg.	HR	RBI
C	Al Spohrer	112	356	113	.317	2	37
1B	George Sisler	116	431	133	.309	3	67
2B	Freddie Maguire	146	516	138	.267	0	52
SS	Rabbit Maranville	142	558	157	.281	2	43
3B	Buster Chatham	112	404	108	.267	5	56
OF	Lance Richbourg	130	529	161	.304	3	54
OF	Jimmy Welsh	113	422	116	.275	3	36
OF	Wally Berger	151	555	172	.310	38	119

==== Other batters ====
Note: G = Games played; AB = At bats; H = Hits; Avg. = Batting average; HR = Home runs; RBI = Runs batted in

Player	G	AB	H	Avg.	HR	RBI
Earl Clark	82	233	69	.296	3	28
Johnny Neun	81	212	69	.325	2	23
Randy Moore	83	191	55	.288	2	34
Bill Cronin	66	178	45	.253	0	17
Red Rollings	52	123	29	.236	0	10
Gene Robertson	21	59	11	.186	0	7
Billy Rhiel	20	47	8	.170	0	4
Bill Dunlap	16	29	2	.069	0	0
Hank Gowdy	16	25	5	.200	0	2
Bernie James	8	11	2	.182	0	1
Buzz Boyle	1	1	0	.000	0	0
Owen Kahn	1	0	0	----	0	0

=== Pitching ===
==== Starting pitchers ====
Note: G = Games pitched; IP = Innings pitched; W = Wins; L = Losses; ERA = Earned run average; SO = Strikeouts

Player	G	IP	W	L	ERA	SO
Socks Seibold	36	251.0	15	16	4.12	70
Bob Smith	38	219.2	10	14	4.26	84
Ben Cantwell	31	173.1	9	15	4.88	43
Tom Zachary	24	151.1	11	5	4.58	57
Bill Sherdel	21	119.1	6	5	4.75	26
Burleigh Grimes	11	49.0	3	5	7.35	15

==== Other pitchers ====
Note: G = Games pitched; IP = Innings pitched; W = Wins; L = Losses; ERA = Earned run average; SO = Strikeouts

Player	G	IP	W	L	ERA	SO
Ed Brandt	41	147.1	4	11	5.01	65
Fred Frankhouse	27	110.2	7	6	5.61	30
Bruce Cunningham	36	106.2	5	6	5.48	28

==== Relief pitchers ====
Note: G = Games pitched; W = Wins; L = Losses; SV = Saves; ERA = Earned run average; SO = Strikeouts

Player	G	W	L	SV	ERA	SO
Ken Jones	8	0	1	0	5.95	4
Bob Brown	3	0	0	0	10.50	1
Johnny Cooney	2	0	0	0	18.00	1
