= 1930 Philadelphia Phillies season =

Major League Baseball season

1930 Philadelphia Phillies
- League: National League
- Ballpark: Baker Bowl
- City: Philadelphia, Pennsylvania
- Owners: William F. Baker
- Managers: Burt Shotton

The following lists the events of the 1930 Philadelphia Phillies season.

The Phillies tallied 1,783 hits, the most ever recorded by a team during a major league season. They recorded a .315 team batting average during the season, which was second in the National League and major league baseball. Only the 1930 New York Giants who batted .319 and the 1921 Detroit Tigers at .316 posted higher team averages in the modern era (since 1901).

However, their pitching is why the Phillies finished in last place. The pitching staff allowed 1,199 runs in 156 games (2 games ended in a tie), an average of 7.69 runs per game. 1,024 of those runs were earned runs, their team earned run average of 6.71 is the highest in the modern era.

== Regular season ==
=== Season standings ===
National League
Team	W	L	Pct.	GB	Home	Road
St. Louis Cardinals	92	62	.597	—	53‍–‍24	39‍–‍38
Chicago Cubs	90	64	.584	2	51‍–‍26	39‍–‍38
New York Giants	87	67	.565	5	46‍–‍31	41‍–‍36
Brooklyn Robins	86	68	.558	6	49‍–‍28	37‍–‍40
Pittsburgh Pirates	80	74	.519	12	42‍–‍35	38‍–‍39
Boston Braves	70	84	.455	22	39‍–‍38	31‍–‍46
Cincinnati Reds	59	95	.383	33	37‍–‍40	22‍–‍55
Philadelphia Phillies	52	102	.338	40	35‍–‍42	17‍–‍60

=== Record vs. opponents ===
1930 National League record Sources:
Team	BSN	BRO	CHC	CIN	NYG	PHI	PIT	STL
Boston	—	9–13	5–17	13–9	11–11	14–8	10–12	8–14
Brooklyn	13–9	—	8–14	13–9	13–9	15–7	13–9	11–11
Chicago	17–5	14–8	—	11–11	10–12	16–6–2	11–11	11–11
Cincinnati	9–13	9–13	11–11	—	7–15	12–10	8–14	3–19
New York	11–11	9–13	12–10	15–7	—	16–6	14–8	10–12
Philadelphia	8–14	7–15	6–16–2	10–12	6–16	—	9–13	6–16
Pittsburgh	12–10	9–13	11–11	14–8	8–14	13–9	—	13–9
St. Louis	14–8	11–11	11–11	19–3	12–10	16–6	9–13	—

=== Roster ===
1930 Philadelphia Phillies
Roster
Pitchers: Pete Alexander; Ray Benge; Hap Collard; Phil Collins; Hal Elliott; Snipe Hansen; Lou Koupal; John Milligan; Chet Nichols, Sr.; Buz Phillips; Harry Smythe; By Speece; Les Sweetland; Claude Willoughby	Catchers: Spud Davis; Harry McCurdy; Tony Rensa; Jim Spotts; Infielders: Bernie Friberg; Don Hurst; Monk Sherlock; Tommy Thevenow; Fresco Thompson; Pinky Whitney	Outfielders: Fred Brickell; Chuck Klein; Lefty O'Doul; Tripp Sigman; Denny Sothern; Cy Williams	Manager: Burt Shotton; Coaches: Fred Hunter

== Player stats ==
=== Batting ===
==== Starters by position ====
Note: Pos = Position; G = Games played; AB = At bats; H = Hits; Avg. = Batting average; HR = Home runs; RBI = Runs batted in

Pos	Player	G	AB	H	Avg.	HR	RBI
C	Spud Davis	106	329	103	.313	14	65
1B	Don Hurst	119	391	128	.327	17	78
2B	Fresco Thompson	122	478	135	.282	4	46
SS	Tommy Thevenow	156	573	164	.286	0	78
3B	Pinky Whitney	149	606	207	.342	8	117
OF	Chuck Klein	156	648	250	.386	40	170
OF	Lefty O'Doul	140	528	202	.383	22	97
OF	Denny Sothern	90	347	97	.280	5	36

==== Other batters ====
Note: G = Games played; AB = At bats; H = Hits; Avg. = Batting average; HR = Home runs; RBI = Runs batted in

Player	G	AB	H	Avg.	HR	RBI
Bernie Friberg	105	331	113	.341	4	42
Monk Sherlock	92	299	97	.324	0	38
Fred Brickell	53	240	59	.246	0	17
Tony Rensa	54	172	49	.285	3	31
Harry McCurdy	80	148	49	.331	1	25
Tripp Sigman	52	100	27	.270	4	6
Cy Williams	21	17	8	.471	0	2
Jim Spotts	3	2	0	.000	0	0

=== Pitching ===
==== Starting pitchers ====
Note: G = Games pitched; IP = Innings pitched; W = Wins; L = Losses; ERA = Earned run average; SO = Strikeouts

Player	G	IP	W	L	ERA	SO
Phil Collins	47	239.0	16	11	4.78	87
Ray Benge	38	225.2	11	15	5.70	70
Les Sweetland	34	167.0	7	15	7.71	36

==== Other pitchers ====
Note: G = Games pitched; IP = Innings pitched; W = Wins; L = Losses; ERA = Earned run average; SO = Strikeouts

Player	G	IP	W	L	ERA	SO
Claude Willoughby	41	153.0	4	17	7.59	38
Hap Collard	30	127.0	6	12	6.80	25
Hal Elliott	48	117.1	6	11	7.67	37
Snipe Hansen	22	84.1	0	7	6.72	25
Chet Nichols Sr.	16	59.2	1	2	6.79	15
Lou Koupal	13	36.2	0	4	8.59	11
John Milligan	9	28.1	1	2	3.18	7
Pete Alexander	9	21.2	0	3	9.14	6

==== Relief pitchers ====
Note: G = Games pitched; W = Wins; L = Losses; SV = Saves; ERA = Earned run average; SO = Strikeouts

Player	G	W	L	SV	ERA	SO
Harry Smythe	25	0	3	2	7.79	9
Buz Phillips	14	0	0	0	8.04	9
By Speece	11	0	0	0	13.27	9
