= 1930 Chicago Cubs season =

1930 Chicago Cubs
- League: National League
- Ballpark: Wrigley Field
- City: Chicago
- Record: 90–64 (.584)
- League place: 3rd
- Owners: William Wrigley Jr.
- Managers: Joe McCarthy, Rogers Hornsby
- Radio: WCFL (Johnny O'Hara); WGN (Quin Ryan); WBBM (Pat Flanagan); WMAQ (Hal Totten)

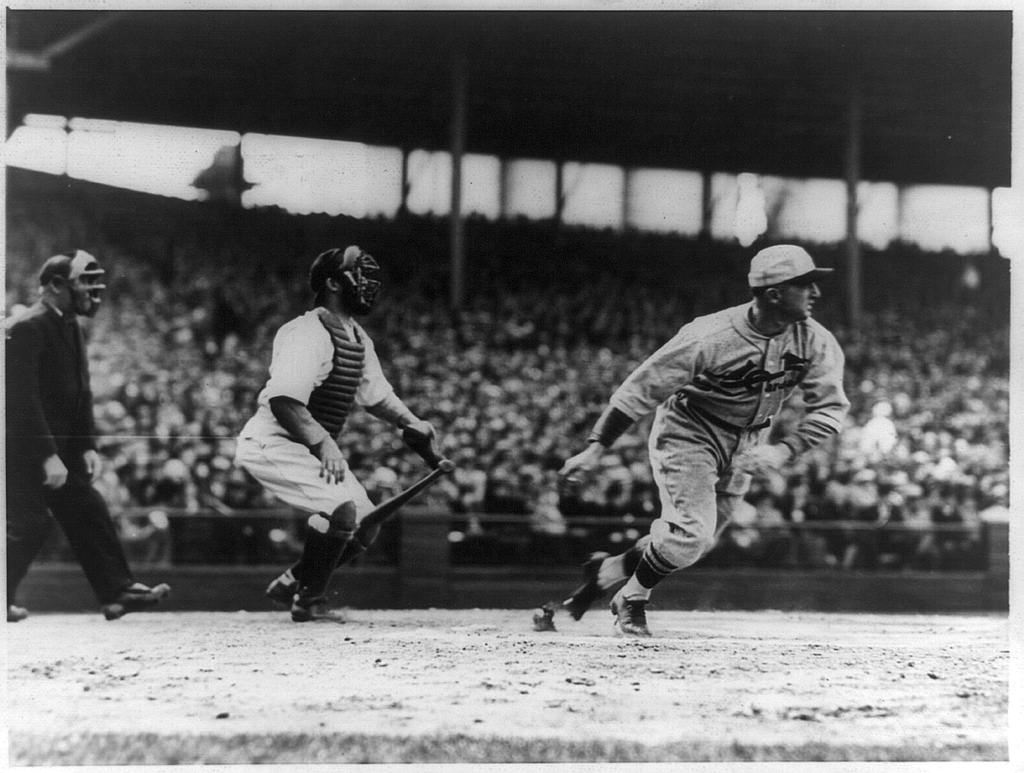
First game of the season (April 22, 1930): Photograph shows Frankie Frisch of St. Louis at bat, with Charles (Gabby) Leo Hartnett catching for the Cubs and umpire William J.(?) Klem.

The 1930 Chicago Cubs season was the 59th season of the Chicago Cubs franchise, the 55th in the National League and the 15th at Wrigley Field. The Cubs were managed by Joe McCarthy and Rogers Hornsby for the final four games of the season. They finished in second place in Major League Baseball's National League with a record of 90–64. In the peak year of the lively ball era, the Cubs scored 998 runs, third most in the majors. Future Hall of Famers Kiki Cuyler, Gabby Hartnett, and Hack Wilson led the offense.

== Regular season ==
Hack Wilson set a major league record for most RBIs in one season with 191. Wilson's 1930 season was considered one of the best ever by a hitter. In addition to hitting 56 home runs, leading the league with 105 walks, and boasting a batting average of .356, he drove in 191 runs, a mark that remains one of the most untouchable MLB records. (For years, record books gave the total as 190, until research in 1999 showed that an RBI credited by an official scorer to Charlie Grimm actually belonged to Wilson.) He recorded that total without hitting a grand slam.

=== Season standings ===
National League
Team	W	L	Pct.	GB	Home	Road
St. Louis Cardinals	92	62	.597	—	53‍–‍24	39‍–‍38
Chicago Cubs	90	64	.584	2	51‍–‍26	39‍–‍38
New York Giants	87	67	.565	5	46‍–‍31	41‍–‍36
Brooklyn Robins	86	68	.558	6	49‍–‍28	37‍–‍40
Pittsburgh Pirates	80	74	.519	12	42‍–‍35	38‍–‍39
Boston Braves	70	84	.455	22	39‍–‍38	31‍–‍46
Cincinnati Reds	59	95	.383	33	37‍–‍40	22‍–‍55
Philadelphia Phillies	52	102	.338	40	35‍–‍42	17‍–‍60

=== Record vs. opponents ===
1930 National League record Sources:
Team	BSN	BRO	CHC	CIN	NYG	PHI	PIT	STL
Boston	—	9–13	5–17	13–9	11–11	14–8	10–12	8–14
Brooklyn	13–9	—	8–14	13–9	13–9	15–7	13–9	11–11
Chicago	17–5	14–8	—	11–11	10–12	16–6–2	11–11	11–11
Cincinnati	9–13	9–13	11–11	—	7–15	12–10	8–14	3–19
New York	11–11	9–13	12–10	15–7	—	16–6	14–8	10–12
Philadelphia	8–14	7–15	6–16–2	10–12	6–16	—	9–13	6–16
Pittsburgh	12–10	9–13	11–11	14–8	8–14	13–9	—	13–9
St. Louis	14–8	11–11	11–11	19–3	12–10	16–6	9–13	—

== Roster ==
1930 Chicago Cubs
Roster
Pitchers: Sheriff Blake; Guy Bush; Hal Carlson; Pat Malone; Bill McAfee; Mal Moss; Lynn Nelson; Bob Osborn; Jesse Petty; Charlie Root; Al Shealy; Bud Teachout; Lon Warneke	Catchers: Gabby Hartnett; Zack Taylor; Infielders: Clyde Beck; Les Bell; Footsie Blair; Woody English; Doc Farrell; Charlie Grimm; Rogers Hornsby; George Kelly; Chick Tolson	Outfielders: Kiki Cuyler; Cliff Heathcote; Riggs Stephenson; Danny Taylor; Hack Wilson	Manager: Rogers Hornsby; Joe McCarthy; Coaches: Jimmy Burke; Grover Land; Ray Schalk

== Player stats ==
= Indicates team leader

= Indicates league leader

= Indicates single season record

=== Batting ===
==== Starters by position ====
Note: Pos = Position; G = Games played; AB = At bats; H = Hits; Avg. = Batting average; HR = Home runs; RBI = Runs batted in

Pos	Player	G	AB	H	Avg.	HR	RBI
C	Gabby Hartnett	141	508	172	.339	37	122
1B	Charlie Grimm	114	429	124	.289	6	66
2B	Footsie Blair	134	578	158	.273	6	59
3B	Woody English	156	638	214	.335	14	59
SS	Clyde Beck	83	244	52	.213	6	34
OF	Riggs Stephenson	109	341	125	.367	5	68
OF	Kiki Cuyler	156	642	228	.355	13	134
OF	Hack Wilson	155	585	208	.356	56	191

==== Other batters ====
Note: G = Games played; AB = At bats; H = Hits; Avg. = Batting average; HR = Home runs; RBI = Runs batted in

Player	G	AB	H	Avg.	HR	RBI
Les Bell	74	248	69	.278	5	47
Danny Taylor	74	219	62	.283	2	37
High Pockets Kelly	39	166	55	.331	3	19
Cliff Heathcote	70	150	39	.260	9	18
Doc Farrell	46	113	33	.292	1	16
Rogers Hornsby	42	104	32	.308	2	18
Zack Taylor	32	95	22	.232	1	11
Chick Tolson	13	20	6	.300	0	1

=== Pitching ===
==== Starting pitchers ====
Note: G = Games pitched; IP = Innings pitched; W = Wins; L = Losses; ERA = Earned run average; SO = Strikeouts

Player	G	IP	W	L	ERA	SO
Pat Malone	45	271.2	20	9	3.14	142
Charlie Root	37	220.1	16	14	4.33	124
Sheriff Blake	34	186.2	10	14	4.82	80
Hal Carlson	8	51.2	4	2	5.05	14

==== Other pitchers ====
Note: G = Games pitched; IP = Innings pitched; W = Wins; L = Losses; ERA = Earned run average; SO = Strikeouts

Player	G	IP	W	L	ERA	SO
Guy Bush	46	225.0	15	10	6.20	75
Bud Teachout	40	153.0	11	4	4.06	59
Bob Osborn	35	126.2	10	6	4.97	42
Hal Carlson	8	51.2	4	2	5.05	14
Jesse Petty	9	39.1	1	3	2.97	18

==== Relief pitchers ====
Note: G = Games pitched; W = Wins; L = Losses; SV = Saves; ERA = Earned run average; SO = Strikeouts

Player	G	W	L	SV	ERA	SO
Lynn Nelson	37	3	2	0	5.09	29
Al Shealy	24	0	0	0	8.00	14
Mal Moss	12	0	0	1	6.27	4
Bill McAfee	2	0	0	0	0.00	0
Lon Warneke	1	0	0	0	33.75	0

== Awards and honors ==
=== League top five finishers ===
Kiki Cuyler

- MLB leader in stolen bases (37)
- #2 in NL in runs scored (155)
- #3 in NL in RBI (134)

Woody English

- #3 in NL in runs scored (152)

Gabby Hartnett

- #4 in NL in home runs (37)

Pat Malone

- NL leader in wins (20)
- #3 in NL in strikeouts (142)
- #4 in NL in ERA (3.94)

Charlie Root

- #4 in NL in strikeouts (124)

Hack Wilson

- MLB leader in home runs (56)
- MLB leader in RBI (191)
- NL leader in slugging percentage (.723)
- #3 in NL in on-base percentage (.454)
- #4 in NL in runs scored (146)

== Farm system ==
Level	Team	League	Manager
AA	Reading Keys	International League	Harry Hinchman and Bob Jones
AA	Los Angeles Angels	Pacific Coast League	Jack Lelivelt
