= Mal Moss =

American baseball player (1905–1983)

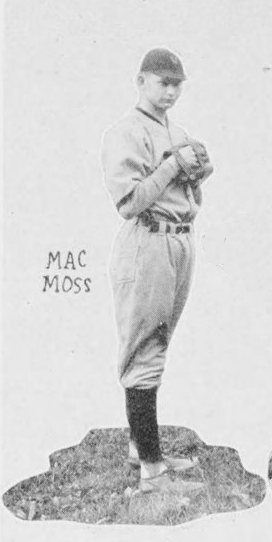
- Pitcher
- Born: April 18, 1905; Sullivan, Indiana, U.S.
- Died: February 6, 1983 (aged 77); Savannah, Georgia, U.S.
- Batted: Right Threw: Left

MLB debut
- April 29, 1930, for the Chicago Cubs

Last MLB appearance
- August 13, 1930, for the Chicago Cubs

MLB statistics
- Win–loss record: 0–0
- Earned run average: 6.27
- Strikeouts: 4
- Stats at Baseball Reference

Teams
- Chicago Cubs (1930)

Charles Malcolm Moss (April 18, 1905 – February 6, 1983) was an American professional athlete and attorney. He was a pitcher who appeared in Major League Baseball in twelve games for the Chicago Cubs in 1930. Born in Sullivan, Indiana, he threw left-handed, batted right-handed, stood 6 feet (1.8 m) tall and weighed 175 pounds (79 kg). He attended Vanderbilt University, graduating in 1927, and earned a J.D. degree from the University of Chicago in 1930.

Moss' professional baseball career lasted for six seasons, 1927 through 1932. In his lone MLB stint, he posted no decisions with one save and two games finished. In one starting pitcher assignment, on July 5, 1930, at Forbes Field against the Pittsburgh Pirates, he worked 41/3 innings and allowed six hits, three earned runs and three bases on balls, with three strikeouts. He departed the game with a 10–3 lead—having helped his own cause by going two for three at the plate with two runs batted in. But because he failed to complete five full innings as the starter, he was not eligible for the victory; the official scorer awarded the win to reliever Bob Osborn, who shut out the Bucs the rest of the way.

In his 12 MLB games, Moss allowed 18 hits, 14 bases on balls, and 13 earned runs in 182/3 innings pitched, notching four strikeouts and posting a 6.27 career earned run average. He batted .273 in 11 at bats, with three singles and two career RBI.

Moss maintained a Chicago law practice after his baseball career; he died at age 77 in Savannah, Georgia, on February 6, 1983.
