= 1930 New York Giants (MLB) season =

1930 New York Giants
- League: National League
- Ballpark: Polo Grounds
- City: New York City
- Record: 87–67 (.565)
- League place: 3rd
- Owners: Charles Stoneham
- Managers: John McGraw

The 1930 New York Giants season was the 48th in franchise history. The team finished third in the National League with a record of 87–67, five games behind the St. Louis Cardinals.

== Regular season ==
Giants player Bill Terry was the last member of the Giants, and the last National League player in the 20th century, to have a batting average of .400 in one season. In the process, he tied the National League record – set the previous year by Lefty O'Doul – for most hits in a single season with 254. As of the end of the 2020 season, that record still stands.

The Giants set a record for the highest team batting average (.319) in the modern era (since 1901). The team's totals of 1,769 hits and 2,628 total bases both set single season franchise records.

=== Season standings ===
National League
Team	W	L	Pct.	GB	Home	Road
St. Louis Cardinals	92	62	.597	—	53‍–‍24	39‍–‍38
Chicago Cubs	90	64	.584	2	51‍–‍26	39‍–‍38
New York Giants	87	67	.565	5	46‍–‍31	41‍–‍36
Brooklyn Robins	86	68	.558	6	49‍–‍28	37‍–‍40
Pittsburgh Pirates	80	74	.519	12	42‍–‍35	38‍–‍39
Boston Braves	70	84	.455	22	39‍–‍38	31‍–‍46
Cincinnati Reds	59	95	.383	33	37‍–‍40	22‍–‍55
Philadelphia Phillies	52	102	.338	40	35‍–‍42	17‍–‍60

=== Record vs. opponents ===
1930 National League record Sources:
Team	BSN	BRO	CHC	CIN	NYG	PHI	PIT	STL
Boston	—	9–13	5–17	13–9	11–11	14–8	10–12	8–14
Brooklyn	13–9	—	8–14	13–9	13–9	15–7	13–9	11–11
Chicago	17–5	14–8	—	11–11	10–12	16–6–2	11–11	11–11
Cincinnati	9–13	9–13	11–11	—	7–15	12–10	8–14	3–19
New York	11–11	9–13	12–10	15–7	—	16–6	14–8	10–12
Philadelphia	8–14	7–15	6–16–2	10–12	6–16	—	9–13	6–16
Pittsburgh	12–10	9–13	11–11	14–8	8–14	13–9	—	13–9
St. Louis	14–8	11–11	11–11	19–3	12–10	16–6	9–13	—

=== Roster ===
1930 New York Giants
Roster
Pitchers: Larry Benton; Tiny Chaplin; Pete Donohue; Freddie Fitzsimmons; Joe Genewich; Joe Heving; Carl Hubbell; Ralph Judd; Ray Lucas; Clarence Mitchell; Bill Morrell; Roy Parmelee; Hub Pruett; Bill Walker	Catchers: Francis Healy; Shanty Hogan; Bob O'Farrell; Infielders: Dave Bancroft; Pat Crawford; Hughie Critz; Travis Jackson; Freddie Lindstrom; Doc Marshall; Bill Terry	Outfielders: Ethan Allen; Chick Fullis; Freddy Leach; Jo-Jo Moore; Mel Ott; Andy Reese; Wally Roettger; Harry Rosenberg; Other batters: Sam Leslie	Manager: John McGraw; Coaches: Dave Bancroft; Irish Meusel

== Player stats ==
=== Batting ===
==== Starters by position ====
Note: Pos = Position; G = Games played; AB = At bats; H = Hits; Avg. = Batting average; HR = Home runs; RBI = Runs batted in

Pos	Player	G	AB	H	Avg.	HR	RBI
C	Shanty Hogan	122	389	132	.339	13	75
1B	Bill Terry	154	633	254	.401	23	129
2B	Hughie Critz	124	558	148	.265	4	50
SS	Travis Jackson	116	431	146	.339	13	82
3B	Freddie Lindstrom	148	609	231	.379	22	106
OF	Mel Ott	148	521	182	.349	25	119
OF	Freddy Leach	126	544	178	.327	13	71
OF	Wally Roettger	121	420	119	.283	5	51

==== Other batters ====
Note: G = Games played; AB = At bats; H = Hits; Avg. = Batting average; HR = Home runs; RBI = Runs batted in

Player	G	AB	H	Avg.	HR	RBI
Bob O'Farrell	94	249	75	.301	4	54
Ethan Allen	76	238	73	.307	7	31
Doc Marshall	78	223	69	.309	0	21
Andy Reese	67	172	47	.273	4	25
Pat Crawford	25	76	21	.276	3	17
Dave Bancroft	10	17	1	.059	0	0
Chick Fullis	13	6	0	.000	0	0
Harry Rosenberg	9	5	0	.000	0	0
Jo-Jo Moore	3	5	1	.200	0	0
Francis Healy	7	2	0	.000	0	0
Sam Leslie	2	2	1	.500	0	0

=== Pitching ===
==== Starting pitchers ====
Note: G = Games pitched; IP = Innings pitched; W = Wins; L = Losses; ERA = Earned run average; SO = Strikeouts

Player	G	IP	W	L	ERA	SO
Bill Walker	39	245.1	17	15	3.93	105
Carl Hubbell	37	241.2	17	12	3.87	117
Freddie Fitzsimmons	41	224.1	19	7	4.25	76
Clarence Mitchell	24	129.0	10	3	3.98	40

==== Other pitchers ====
Note: G = Games pitched; IP = Innings pitched; W = Wins; L = Losses; ERA = Earned run average; SO = Strikeouts

Player	G	IP	W	L	ERA	SO
Hub Pruett	45	135.0	5	4	4.78	49
Pete Donohue	18	86.2	7	6	6.13	26
Tiny Chaplin	19	73.0	2	6	5.18	20
Joe Genewich	18	61.0	2	5	5.61	13
Larry Benton	8	30.0	1	3	7.80	16

==== Relief pitchers ====
Note: G = Games pitched; W = Wins; L = Losses; SV = Saves; ERA = Earned run average; SO = Strikeouts

Player	G	W	L	SV	ERA	SO
Joe Heving	41	7	5	6	5.22	37
Roy Parmelee	11	0	1	0	9.43	19
Ray Lucas	6	0	0	0	6.97	1
Bill Morrell	2	0	0	0	1.13	3
Ralph Judd	2	0	0	0	5.87	0

== Awards and honors ==
=== League records ===
- Bill Terry, National League record, most hits in a single season (tied with Lefty O'Doul)

=== League leaders ===
- Bill Terry, National League batting champion

== Farm system ==
Level	Team	League	Manager
AA	Toledo Mud Hens	American Association	Casey Stengel
A	Bridgeport Bears	Eastern League	Hans Lobert
