= 1930 Cincinnati Reds season =

1930 Cincinnati Reds
- League: National League
- Ballpark: Redland Field
- City: Cincinnati
- Owners: Sidney Weil
- Managers: Dan Howley
- Radio: WSAI (Bob Burdette, Sidney Ten-Eyck)

The 1930 Cincinnati Reds season was a season in American baseball. The team finished seventh in the National League with a record of 59–95, 33 games behind the St. Louis Cardinals.

== Off-season ==
During the off-season, the Reds fired manager Jack Hendricks after a 66-88 season in 1929. Hendricks had managed the club since 1924, and posted a 469-450 record during that span. The Reds failed to qualify for the World Series during his tenure, although the team did finish in second place, just three games out of first, during 1926.

The Reds named Dan Howley as their new manager. Howley had managed the St. Louis Browns from 1927 until 1929, as the club had a record of 220-239. His best season with the Browns was in 1928, when the club finished in third place as they had a record of 82-72. Howley also had managerial experience with the Toronto Maple Leafs of the International League, leading the club to the pennant in 1918 and 1926.

On October 24, Cincinnati purchased outfielder Harry Heilmann from the Detroit Tigers. Heilmann, who had played with the Tigers since 1914, had a career batting average of .342 with 164 home runs and 1446 RBI in 1990 games. Heilmann led the American League in batting average four times, including a career high .403 average in 1923. He also led the AL in doubles in 1924 with 45, and in RBI in 1925 with 134. In 1929 with the Tigers, Heilmann hit .344 with 15 home runs and 120 RBI in 125 games.

On October 29, the Reds made another transaction, as the team purchased outfielder Bob Meusel from the New York Yankees. Meusel had played with New York since 1920, in which he played in 1294 games, hit .311 with 146 home runs, 1009 RBI and stole 134 bases. His best season was in 1925, as Meusel led the American League with 33 home runs and 134 RBI. Meusel also appeared in six World Series with the Yankees, playing in 34 games. He had a batting average of .225 with a home run and 17 RBI, as New York won the World Series in 1923, 1927 and 1928. In 1929, Meusel played in 100 games, hitting .261 with 10 home runs and 57 RBI.

On February 5, the Reds purchased infielder Leo Durocher from the New York Yankees for cash and a player to be named. Durocher, who would turn 25 during the 1930 season, batted .246 with 32 RBI in 106 games with the Yankees in 1929.

On the same day, Cincinnati dealt pitcher Dolf Luque to the Brooklyn Robins in exchange for pitcher Doug McWeeny. Luque had been with the Reds since 1918, posting a record of 154-152 with a 3.09 ERA in 395 games. Luque's best season came in 1923, as he led the National League with 27 wins, a 1.93 ERA and six shutouts. Luque again led the league in ERA in 1925 at 2.63. He struggled during the 1929 season, as he had a 5-16 record with a 4.50 ERA. McWeeny struggled for the Robins in 1929, as he went 4-10 with a 6.10 ERA in 36 games. In 1928, McWeeny led the league with four shutouts.

== Regular season ==
The rebuilding Reds got off to a good start, as the team was 12-11 in their first 23 games, and in a tie for third place, just three games behind the first place New York Giants. Cincinnati then lost 10 consecutive games, dropping them into seventh place with a 12-21 record. Cincinnati did win six of their next eight ballgames to get within five games of the .500 level, however, the losses continued to pile up as the season went on.

The club made a few notable transactions during the season, as on May 21, Cincinnati traded second baseman Hughie Critz to the New York Giants for pitcher Larry Benton. Benton led the league in wins in 1928 with 25, and in complete games with 28. He struggled with the Giants in 1930, as he had a 1-3 record with a 7.80 ERA in eight games at the time of the trade.

Less than a week later, on May 27 the Reds dealt outfielder Ethan Allen and pitcher Pete Donohue to the Giants for second baseman Pat Crawford. Crawford was hitting .276 with three home runs and 17 RBI in 25 games with New York.

On July 10, the Reds released first baseman High Pockets Kelly. At the time of his release, Kelly had a .287 batting average with five home runs and 35 RBI in 51 games.

Wins were scarce for the club during the season, although the Reds did sweep a five game series against the Brooklyn Robins in August. Cincinnati narrowly avoided last place in the National League, as they finished in seventh with a 59-95 record, finishing only ahead of the Philadelphia Phillies.

The 59 wins and .383 winning percentage was the fewest by the team since they won only 52 games and had a .374 winning percentage during the 1901 season. The Reds 95 losses set a club record, which was previously held in 1914 when they lost 94 games. The seventh place finish was the lowest the worst showing by the Reds since 1916, in which they also finished in seventh.

Outfielder Harry Heilmann had an excellent season with the club, as he led the Reds in batting average at .333, home runs with 19, RBI with 91, and runs with 79, as he appeared in 142 games. Rookie third baseman Tony Cuccinello hit .312 with 10 home runs and 78 RBI in 125 games. First baseman Joe Stripp hit .306 with three home runs, 64 RBI and a team high 15 stolen bases. Outfielder Bob Meusel batted .289 with 10 home runs and 62 RBI in 113 games, while outfielder Curt Walker batted .307 with eight home runs and 51 RBI in 134 games in his final major league season.

Rookie Benny Frey anchored the pitching staff, as he led the club with 245 innings pitched in 44 games. He finished the season with a record of 11-18 with a 4.70 ERA. His 18 losses led the league. Red Lucas led the Reds in wins, as he finished the year with a 14-16 record with a 5.38 ERA in 210.2 innings pitched. His 18 complete games and 53 strikeouts led the team. Mid-season acquisition Larry Benton struggled to a 7-12 record with a 5.12 ERA in 35 games with the Reds.

=== Season standings ===
National League
Team	W	L	Pct.	GB	Home	Road
St. Louis Cardinals	92	62	.597	—	53‍–‍24	39‍–‍38
Chicago Cubs	90	64	.584	2	51‍–‍26	39‍–‍38
New York Giants	87	67	.565	5	46‍–‍31	41‍–‍36
Brooklyn Robins	86	68	.558	6	49‍–‍28	37‍–‍40
Pittsburgh Pirates	80	74	.519	12	42‍–‍35	38‍–‍39
Boston Braves	70	84	.455	22	39‍–‍38	31‍–‍46
Cincinnati Reds	59	95	.383	33	37‍–‍40	22‍–‍55
Philadelphia Phillies	52	102	.338	40	35‍–‍42	17‍–‍60

=== Record vs. opponents ===
1930 National League record Sources:
Team	BSN	BRO	CHC	CIN	NYG	PHI	PIT	STL
Boston	—	9–13	5–17	13–9	11–11	14–8	10–12	8–14
Brooklyn	13–9	—	8–14	13–9	13–9	15–7	13–9	11–11
Chicago	17–5	14–8	—	11–11	10–12	16–6–2	11–11	11–11
Cincinnati	9–13	9–13	11–11	—	7–15	12–10	8–14	3–19
New York	11–11	9–13	12–10	15–7	—	16–6	14–8	10–12
Philadelphia	8–14	7–15	6–16–2	10–12	6–16	—	9–13	6–16
Pittsburgh	12–10	9–13	11–11	14–8	8–14	13–9	—	13–9
St. Louis	14–8	11–11	11–11	19–3	12–10	16–6	9–13	—

=== Roster ===
1930 Cincinnati Reds
Roster
Pitchers: Ken Ash; Larry Benton; Archie Campbell; Ownie Carroll; Pete Donohue; Al Eckert; Benny Frey; Si Johnson; Ray Kolp; Red Lucas; Jakie May; Doug McWeeny; Eppa Rixey; Biff Wysong	Catchers: Johnny Gooch; Lena Styles; Clyde Sukeforth; Infielders: Pat Crawford; Hughie Critz; Tony Cuccinello; Chuck Dressen; Leo Durocher; Hod Ford; George Kelly; Joe Stripp	Outfielders: Ethan Allen; Marty Callaghan; Nick Cullop; Harry Heilmann; Bob Meusel; Evar Swanson; Curt Walker; Other batters: Harry Riconda	Manager: Dan Howley; Coaches: Mickey Doolan; Otto Williams

== Player stats ==
=== Batting ===
==== Starters by position ====
Note: Pos = Position; G = Games played; AB = At bats; H = Hits; Avg. = Batting average; HR = Home runs; RBI = Runs batted in

Pos	Player	G	AB	H	Avg.	HR	RBI
C	Clyde Sukeforth	94	296	84	.284	1	19
1B	Joe Stripp	130	464	142	.306	3	64
2B	Hod Ford	132	424	98	.231	1	34
SS	Leo Durocher	119	354	86	.243	3	32
3B	Tony Cuccinello	125	443	138	.312	10	78
OF	Bob Meusel	113	443	128	.289	10	62
OF	Curt Walker	134	472	145	.307	8	51
OF	Harry Heilmann	142	459	153	.333	19	91

==== Other batters ====
Note: G = Games played; AB = At bats; H = Hits; Avg. = Batting average; HR = Home runs; RBI = Runs batted in

Player	G	AB	H	Avg.	HR	RBI
Evar Swanson	95	301	93	.309	2	22
Johnny Gooch	82	276	67	.243	2	30
Marty Callaghan	79	225	62	.276	0	16
Pat Crawford	76	224	65	.290	3	26
High Pockets Kelly	51	188	54	.287	5	35
Hughie Critz	28	104	24	.231	0	11
Ethan Allen	21	46	10	.217	3	7
Nick Cullop	7	22	4	.182	1	5
Chuck Dressen	33	19	4	.211	0	1
Lena Styles	7	12	3	.250	0	1
Harry Riconda	1	1	0	.000	0	0

=== Pitching ===
==== Starting pitchers ====
Note: G = Games pitched; IP = Innings pitched; W = Wins; L = Losses; ERA = Earned run average; SO = Strikeouts

Player	G	IP	W	L	ERA	SO
Red Lucas	33	210.2	14	16	5.38	53
Biff Wysong	1	2.1	0	1	19.29	1

==== Other pitchers ====
Note: G = Games pitched; IP = Innings pitched; W = Wins; L = Losses; ERA = Earned run average; SO = Strikeouts

Player	G	IP	W	L	ERA	SO
Benny Frey	44	245.0	11	18	4.70	43
Larry Benton	35	177.2	7	12	5.12	47
Ray Kolp	37	168.1	7	12	4.22	40
Eppa Rixey	32	164.0	9	13	5.10	37
Jakie May	26	112.1	3	11	5.77	44
Pete Donohue	8	34.1	1	3	6.29	4
Doug McWeeny	8	25.2	0	2	7.36	10
Ownie Carroll	3	14.0	0	1	4.50	0
Al Eckert	2	5.0	0	1	7.20	1

==== Relief pitchers ====
Note: G = Games pitched; W = Wins; L = Losses; SV = Saves; ERA = Earned run average; SO = Strikeouts

Player	G	W	L	SV	ERA	SO
Si Johnson	35	3	1	0	4.94	47
Archie Campbell	23	2	4	3	5.43	19
Ken Ash	16	2	0	0	3.43	15

== Farm system ==
Level	Team	League	Manager
B	Peoria Tractors	Illinois–Indiana–Iowa League	Lester "Pat" Patterson and Deeby Foss
