= 1930 St. Louis Cardinals season =

Major League Baseball season

1930 St. Louis Cardinals
- National League champions
- League: National League
- Ballpark: Sportsman's Park III
- City: St. Louis, Missouri
- Record: 92–62 (.597)
- League place: 1st
- Owner: Sam Breadon
- General manager: Branch Rickey
- Manager: Gabby Street
- Radio: KMOX (France Laux); KWK (Thomas Patrick); WIL (Eddie Benson)

The 1930 St. Louis Cardinals season was the team's 49th season in St. Louis, Missouri and the 39th season in the National League. The Cardinals went 92–62 during the season and finished first in the National League. In the World Series, they lost to the Philadelphia Athletics in six games.

== Regular season ==
In the 1930 season, every Cardinals player with over 300 at bats had a batting average over .300, the only time in history this has happened.

=== Season standings ===
National League
Team	W	L	Pct.	GB	Home	Road
St. Louis Cardinals	92	62	.597	—	53‍–‍24	39‍–‍38
Chicago Cubs	90	64	.584	2	51‍–‍26	39‍–‍38
New York Giants	87	67	.565	5	46‍–‍31	41‍–‍36
Brooklyn Robins	86	68	.558	6	49‍–‍28	37‍–‍40
Pittsburgh Pirates	80	74	.519	12	42‍–‍35	38‍–‍39
Boston Braves	70	84	.455	22	39‍–‍38	31‍–‍46
Cincinnati Reds	59	95	.383	33	37‍–‍40	22‍–‍55
Philadelphia Phillies	52	102	.338	40	35‍–‍42	17‍–‍60

=== Record vs. opponents ===
1930 National League record Sources:
Team	BSN	BRO	CHC	CIN	NYG	PHI	PIT	STL
Boston	—	9–13	5–17	13–9	11–11	14–8	10–12	8–14
Brooklyn	13–9	—	8–14	13–9	13–9	15–7	13–9	11–11
Chicago	17–5	14–8	—	11–11	10–12	16–6–2	11–11	11–11
Cincinnati	9–13	9–13	11–11	—	7–15	12–10	8–14	3–19
New York	11–11	9–13	12–10	15–7	—	16–6	14–8	10–12
Philadelphia	8–14	7–15	6–16–2	10–12	6–16	—	9–13	6–16
Pittsburgh	12–10	9–13	11–11	14–8	8–14	13–9	—	13–9
St. Louis	14–8	11–11	11–11	19–3	12–10	16–6	9–13	—

=== Roster ===
1930 St. Louis Cardinals
Roster
Pitchers: Hi Bell; Dizzy Dean; Fred Frankhouse; Al Grabowski; Burleigh Grimes; Hal Haid; Jesse Haines; Bill Hallahan; Carmen Hill; Syl Johnson; Tony Kaufmann; Jim Lindsey; Clarence Mitchell; Flint Rhem; Bill Sherdel	Catchers: Gus Mancuso; Earl Smith; Jimmie Wilson; Infielders: Sparky Adams; Jim Bottomley; Doc Farrell; Frankie Frisch; Charlie Gelbert; Andy High; Ernie Orsatti	Outfielders: Ray Blades; Taylor Douthit; Showboat Fisher; Chick Hafey; Homer Peel; George Puccinelli; George Watkins; Other batters: Pepper Martin	Manager: Gabby Street; Coaches: Ray Blades; Buzzy Wares

== Player stats ==
=== Batting ===
==== Starters by position ====
Note: Pos = Position; G = Games played; AB = At bats; H = Hits; Avg. = Batting average; HR = Home runs; RBI = Runs batted in

Pos	Player	G	AB	H	Avg.	HR	RBI
C	Jimmie Wilson	107	362	115	.318	1	58
1B	Jim Bottomley	131	487	148	.304	15	97
2B	Frankie Frisch	133	540	187	.346	10	114
SS	Charlie Gelbert	139	513	156	.304	3	72
3B	Sparky Adams	137	570	179	.314	0	55
OF	Chick Hafey	120	446	150	.336	26	107
OF	Taylor Douthit	154	664	201	.303	7	93
OF	George Watkins	119	391	146	.373	17	87

==== Other batters ====
Note: G = Games played; AB = At bats; H = Hits; Avg. = Batting average; HR = Home runs; RBI = Runs batted in

Player	G	AB	H	Avg.	HR	RBI
Showboat Fisher	92	254	95	.374	8	61
Gus Mancuso	76	227	83	.366	7	59
Andy High	72	215	60	.279	2	29
Ernie Orsatti	48	131	42	.321	1	15
Ray Blades	45	101	40	.396	4	25
Homer Peel	26	73	12	.164	0	10
Doc Farrell	23	61	13	.213	0	6
George Puccinelli	11	16	9	.563	3	8
Earl Smith	8	10	0	.000	0	0
Pepper Martin	6	1	0	.000	0	0

=== Pitching ===
==== Starting pitchers ====
Note: G = Games pitched; IP = Innings pitched; W = Wins; L = Losses; ERA = Earned run average; SO = Strikeouts

Player	G	IP	W	L	ERA	SO
Bill Hallahan	35	237.1	15	9	4.66	177
Syl Johnson	32	187.2	12	10	4.65	92
Jesse Haines	29	182.0	13	8	4.30	68
Burleigh Grimes	22	152.1	13	6	3.01	58
Flint Rhem	26	139.2	12	8	4.45	47

==== Other pitchers ====
Note: G = Games pitched; IP = Innings pitched; W = Wins; L = Losses; ERA = Earned run average; SO = Strikeouts

Player	G	IP	W	L	ERA	SO
Fred Frankhouse	8	19.2	2	3	7.32	4
Carmen Hill	4	14.2	0	1	7.36	8
Tony Kaufmann	2	10.1	0	1	7.84	2
Dizzy Dean	1	9.0	1	0	1.00	5
Clarence Mitchell	1	3.0	1	0	6.00	1

==== Relief pitchers ====
Note: G = Games pitched; W = Wins; L = Losses; SV = Saves; ERA = Earned run average; SO = Strikeouts

Player	G	W	L	SV	ERA	SO
Hi Bell	39	4	3	8	3.90	42
Jim Lindsey	39	7	5	6	4.43	50
Al Grabowski	33	6	4	3	4.79	43
Hal Haid	20	3	2	2	4.09	13
Bill Sherdel	13	3	2	0	4.64	29

== 1930 World Series ==
AL Philadelphia Athletics (4) vs. NL St. Louis Cardinals (2)

Game	Score	Date	Location	Attendance
1	Cardinals – 2, Athletics – 5	October 1	Shibe Park	32,295
2	Cardinals – 1, Athletics – 6	October 2	Shibe Park	32,295
3	Athletics – 0, Cardinals – 5	October 4	Sportsman's Park	36,944
4	Athletics – 1, Cardinals – 3	October 5	Sportsman's Park	39,946
5	Athletics – 2, Cardinals – 0	October 6	Sportsman's Park	38,844
6	Cardinals – 1, Athletics – 7	October 8	Shibe Park	32,295

== Farm system ==
Level	Team	League	Manager
AA	Rochester Red Wings	International League	Billy Southworth
A	Houston Buffaloes	Texas League	Joe Schultz, Sr.
A	St. Joseph Saints	Western League	Gene Bailey, Joe Sugden and Everitt Booe
B	Danville Veterans	Illinois–Indiana–Iowa League	Frank Murphy
C	Scottdale Scotties	Middle Atlantic League	Eddie Dyer
C	Greensboro Patriots	Piedmont League	Everitt Booe, Hobe Brummitt and Clay Hopper
D	Waynesboro Red Birds	Blue Ridge League	Bob Rice

LEAGUE CHAMPIONS: Rochester
