= Doc Marshall =

Doc Marshall may refer to:

- Doc Marshall (catcher) (1875–1959), American baseball catcher who played between 1904 and 1909
- Doc Marshall (infielder) (1906–1999), American baseball infielder who played between 1929 and 1932
- Roger Marshall (b. 1960), American politician and physician from Kansas
