= Tripp Sigman =

American baseball player

- Pinch hitter / Center fielder
- Born: January 17, 1899; Mooresville, North Carolina, U.S.
- Died: March 8, 1971 (aged 72); Augusta, Georgia, U.S.
- Batted: Left Threw: Right

MLB debut
- September 18, 1929, for the Philadelphia Phillies

Last MLB appearance
- August 28, 1930, for the Philadelphia Phillies

MLB statistics
- Batting average: .326
- Home runs: 6
- Runs batted in: 15
- Stats at Baseball Reference

Teams
- Philadelphia Phillies (1929–1930)

Wesley Triplett Sigman (January 17, 1899 – March 8, 1971) was an American professional baseball player who played as an outfielder in Major League Baseball for the Philadelphia Phillies from 1929 to 1930.
