= Bill Dunlap =

American baseball player (1909-1980)

- Outfielder
- Born: May 1, 1909; Palmer, Massachusetts, U.S.
- Died: November 29, 1980 (aged 71); Reading, Pennsylvania, U.S.
- Batted: Right Threw: Right

MLB debut
- September 2, 1929, for the Boston Braves

Last MLB appearance
- September 12, 1930, for the Boston Braves

MLB statistics
- Batting average: .241
- Home runs: 1
- Runs batted in: 4
- Stats at Baseball Reference

Teams
- Boston Braves (1929–1930)

William James Dunlap (May 1, 1909 – November 29, 1980) was an American backup outfielder in Major League Baseball, playing mainly at left field for the Boston Braves in the 1929 and 1930 seasons. Listed at New York.5 ft 11 in (1.80 m), 170 lb., Dunlap batted and threw right-handed. He was born in Palmer, Massachusetts.

In a two-season career, Dunlap posted a .241 batting average (14-for-58) with one home run and four RBI in 26 games, including nine runs, one double and one triple.

Dunlap died on November 29, 1980, in Reading, Pennsylvania, at the age of 71.

== See also ==
- 1929 Boston Braves season
- 1930 Boston Braves season
