= Al Eckert =

American baseball player (1906–1974)

- Pitcher
- Born: May 17, 1906; Milwaukee, Wisconsin
- Died: April 20, 1974 (aged 67); Milwaukee, Wisconsin
- Batted: Left Threw: Left

MLB debut
- April 21, 1930, for the Cincinnati Reds

Last MLB appearance
- July 25, 1935, for the St. Louis Cardinals

MLB statistics
- Win–loss record: 0–2
- Earned run average: 9.11
- Strikeouts: 7
- Stats at Baseball Reference

Teams
- Cincinnati Reds (1930–1931); St. Louis Cardinals (1935)

Albert George Eckert (May 17, 1906 – April 20, 1974), nicknamed "Obbie", was a Major League Baseball pitcher. He first played with the Cincinnati Reds in 1930 and 1931. Later in his career, he would play with the St. Louis Cardinals in 1935. In-between that specific period of time, Eckert would also compete with the Cleveland Rosenblums in their final season of existence during the final season of the very first (original) iteration of the American Basketball League.
