= Marty Lang =

American baseball player (1905–1968)

- Pitcher
- Born: September 27, 1905; Hooper, Nebraska, U.S.
- Died: January 13, 1968 (aged 62); Lakewood, Colorado, U.S.
- Batted: Right Threw: Left

MLB debut
- July 4, 1930, for the Pittsburgh Pirates

Last MLB appearance
- July 14, 1930, for the Pittsburgh Pirates

MLB statistics
- Win–loss record: 0-0
- Earned run average: 54.00
- Strikeouts: 2
- Stats at Baseball Reference

Teams
- Pittsburgh Pirates (1930)

Martin John Lang (September 27, 1905—January 13, 1968) was an American pitcher in Major League Baseball. He played for the 1930 Pittsburgh Pirates. He batted right-handed and threw left-handed. He was 5'11 and weighed 160 lbs (pounds). He attended Concordia University.

Lang was born on September 27, 1905, in Hooper, Nebraska, and died on January 13, 1968, in Lakewood, Colorado.
