= Al Shealy =

American baseball player (1900–1967)

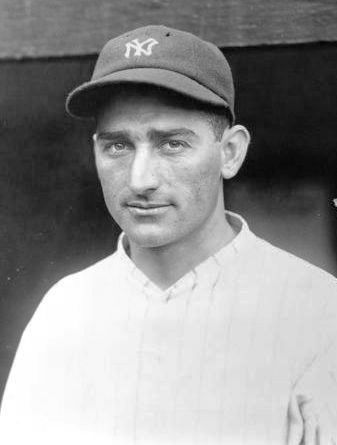
- Pitcher
- Born: May 24, 1900; Chapin, South Carolina, U.S.
- Died: March 7, 1967 (aged 66); Hagerstown, Maryland, U.S.
- Batted: Right Threw: Right

MLB debut
- April 13, 1928, for the New York Yankees

Last MLB appearance
- September 3, 1930, for the Chicago Cubs

MLB statistics
- Win–loss record: 8-6
- Strikeouts: 53
- Earned run average: 5.71
- Stats at Baseball Reference

Teams
- New York Yankees (1928); Chicago Cubs (1930)

Career highlights and awards
- World Series champion (1928)

Albert Berley Shealy (May 24, 1900 – March 7, 1967) was an American professional baseball pitcher. He played parts of two seasons in Major League Baseball, 1928 for the New York Yankees and 1930 for the Chicago Cubs.

After being a baseball player, Shealy became a teacher for the school district in Chester, South Carolina from 1946–1966. He also served as the baseball coach for Chester High School and principal of Chester Junior High School. He moved to Hagerstown, Maryland after retiring and died at Washington County Hospital on March 7, 1967 at the age of 66.
