= Biff Wysong =

American baseball player (1905–1951)

- Pitcher
- Born: April 13, 1905; Clarksville, Ohio, U.S.
- Died: August 7, 1951 (aged 46); Xenia, Ohio, U.S.
- Batted: Left Threw: Left

MLB debut
- August 10, 1930, for the Cincinnati Reds

Last MLB appearance
- May 7, 1932, for the Cincinnati Reds

MLB statistics
- Win–loss record: 1–3
- Earned run average: 7.18
- Strikeouts: 11
- Stats at Baseball Reference

Teams
- Cincinnati Reds (1930–1932)

Harlan "Biff" Wysong (April 13, 1905 – August 7, 1951) was an American professional baseball pitcher. He played all or part of three seasons in Major League Baseball for the Cincinnati Reds. He appeared in 20 games from 1930 to 1932.
