= Ralph Judd =

American baseball player (1901-1957)

- Pitcher
- Born: December 7, 1901; Perrysburg, Ohio, U.S.
- Died: May 6, 1957 (aged 55); Lapeer, Michigan, U.S.
- Batted: Left Threw: Right

MLB debut
- October 2, 1927, for the Washington Senators

Last MLB appearance
- May 7, 1930, for the New York Giants

MLB statistics
- Win–loss record: 3–0
- Earned run average: 3.32
- Strikeouts: 23
- Stats at Baseball Reference

Teams
- Washington Senators (1927); New York Giants (1929–1930)

Ralph Wesley Judd (December 7, 1901 – May 6, 1957) was an American professional baseball player. He was a right-handed pitcher over parts of three seasons (1927, 1929–30) with the Washington Senators and New York Giants. For his career, he compiled a 3–0 record, with a 3.32 earned run average, and 23 strikeouts in 62⅓ innings pitched.

He was born in Perrysburg, Ohio, and died in Lapeer, Michigan, at the age of 55. He married Rosa Lee Atkins on 14 October 1929 in Birmingham, Jefferson County, Alabama. They had at least one child, a son, born July 9, 1932 in Houston, Harris County, Texas.
