= Buster Chatham =

American baseball player (1901-1975)

- Third baseman / Shortstop
- Born: December 25, 1901; West, Texas, U.S.
- Died: December 15, 1975 (aged 73); Waco, Texas, U.S.
- Batted: Right Threw: Right

MLB debut
- June 1, 1930, for the Boston Braves

Last MLB appearance
- June 13, 1931, for the Boston Braves

MLB statistics
- Batting average: .263
- Home runs: 6
- Runs batted in: 59
- Stats at Baseball Reference

Teams
- Boston Braves (1930–1931)

Charles Lorenzo Chatham (December 25, 1901 – December 15, 1975) was an American Major League Baseball infielder. He played two seasons with the Boston Braves from 1930 to 1931.

Chatham's height was 5 feet 7 inches (1.70 m) and he weighed 150 pounds (68 kg), but he was known as the "Little Giant". After his Major League career finished, Chatham played for many years in the Texas League, hitting over .300 in seven seasons and playing shortstop for the championship winning Fort Worth team in 1939 and 1940. Chatham later worked as a scout for the Pittsburgh Pirates, San Francisco Giants, Detroit Tigers and Texas Rangers.
