= Marty Callaghan =

American baseball player (1900–1975)

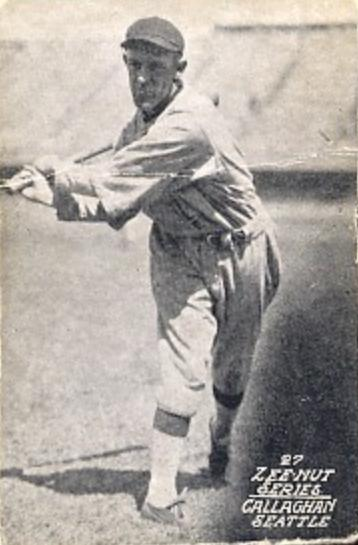
- Outfielder
- Born: June 9, 1900; Norwood, Massachusetts, U.S.
- Died: June 23, 1975 (aged 75); Norfolk, Massachusetts, U.S.
- Batted: Left Threw: Left

MLB debut
- April 13, 1922, for the Chicago Cubs

Last MLB appearance
- September 28, 1930, for the Cincinnati Reds

MLB statistics
- Batting average: .267
- Hits: 205
- Runs batted in: 74
- Stats at Baseball Reference

Teams
- Chicago Cubs (1922–1923); Cincinnati Reds (1928, 1930)

Martin Francis Callaghan (June 9, 1900 – June 23, 1975) was an American Major League Baseball outfielder who played for four seasons. He played for the Chicago Cubs from 1922 to 1923 and the Cincinnati Reds in 1928 and 1930.

A 1916 graduate of Norwood High School, Callaghan was highly celebrated in his hometown of Norwood, Massachusetts. A "Marty Callaghan Day" was once held, which attracted many spectators and the Norwood Brass Band.

In addition to his 4 major league seasons, Callaghan played 11 seasons in the minor leagues, playing until 1934. Callaghan has the distinction of being one of few players in major league history that have batted three times in one inning, a feat that Callaghan accomplished on August 25, 1922. He had two singles and a strikeout during the fourth inning of a 26-23 victory over the Philadelphia Phillies
