= 1930 Brooklyn Robins season =

1930 Brooklyn Robins
- League: National League
- Ballpark: Ebbets Field
- City: Brooklyn, New York
- Record: 86–68 (.558)
- League place: 4th
- Owners: Stephen McKeever, Brooklyn Trust Company
- President: Frank York
- Managers: Wilbert Robinson

The 1930 Brooklyn Robins were in first place from mid-May through mid-August but faded down the stretch and finished the season in fourth place.

== Offseason ==
- February 5, 1930: Doug McWeeny was traded by the Robins to the Cincinnati Reds for Dolf Luque.

== Regular season ==
This team featured one of the best offensive players in the game in Babe Herman and one of the best pitchers in Hall of Famer Dazzy Vance. Herman was arguably the second-best National League hitter in 1930, after Hack Wilson. He finished in the top three in batting average, on-base percentage, and slugging percentage.

Vance was even more impressive. He led the NL in ERA by more than a full run, at 2.61. Considering that 1930 was a great year for hitters, statistically, this number is far better than it actually seems. Vance was also second in strikeouts and anchored a pitching staff that allowed the fewest runs in the league.

=== Season standings ===
National League
Team	W	L	Pct.	GB	Home	Road
St. Louis Cardinals	92	62	.597	—	53‍–‍24	39‍–‍38
Chicago Cubs	90	64	.584	2	51‍–‍26	39‍–‍38
New York Giants	87	67	.565	5	46‍–‍31	41‍–‍36
Brooklyn Robins	86	68	.558	6	49‍–‍28	37‍–‍40
Pittsburgh Pirates	80	74	.519	12	42‍–‍35	38‍–‍39
Boston Braves	70	84	.455	22	39‍–‍38	31‍–‍46
Cincinnati Reds	59	95	.383	33	37‍–‍40	22‍–‍55
Philadelphia Phillies	52	102	.338	40	35‍–‍42	17‍–‍60

=== Record vs. opponents ===
1930 National League record Sources:
Team	BSN	BRO	CHC	CIN	NYG	PHI	PIT	STL
Boston	—	9–13	5–17	13–9	11–11	14–8	10–12	8–14
Brooklyn	13–9	—	8–14	13–9	13–9	15–7	13–9	11–11
Chicago	17–5	14–8	—	11–11	10–12	16–6–2	11–11	11–11
Cincinnati	9–13	9–13	11–11	—	7–15	12–10	8–14	3–19
New York	11–11	9–13	12–10	15–7	—	16–6	14–8	10–12
Philadelphia	8–14	7–15	6–16–2	10–12	6–16	—	9–13	6–16
Pittsburgh	12–10	9–13	11–11	14–8	8–14	13–9	—	13–9
St. Louis	14–8	11–11	11–11	19–3	12–10	16–6	9–13	—

=== Roster ===
1930 Brooklyn Robins
Roster
Pitchers: Watty Clark; Clise Dudley; Jumbo Elliott; Jim Faulkner; Fred Heimach; Dolf Luque; Cy Moore; Johnny Morrison; Ray Moss; Bobo Newsom; Ray Phelps; Sloppy Thurston; Dazzy Vance	Catchers: Hank DeBerry; Al López; Val Picinich; Infielders: Del Bissonette; Neal Finn; Jake Flowers; Wally Gilbert; Eddie Moore; Gordon Slade; Jack Warner; Glenn Wright	Outfielders: Ike Boone; Rube Bressler; Johnny Frederick; Harvey Hendrick; Babe Herman; Hal Lee	Manager: Wilbert Robinson; Coaches: Otto Miller; Ivy Olson

== Player stats ==
= Indicates team leader

=== Batting ===
==== Starters by position ====
Note: Pos = Position; G = Games played; AB = At bats; R = Runs; H = Hits; Avg. = Batting average; HR = Home runs; RBI = Runs batted in; SB = Stolen bases

Pos	Player	G	AB	R	H	Avg.	HR	RBI	SB
C	Al López	128	421	60	130	.309	6	57	3
1B	Del Bissonette	146	572	102	192	.336	16	113	4
2B	Neal Finn	87	273	42	76	.278	3	30	3
3B	Wally Gilbert	150	623	92	183	.294	3	67	7
SS	Glenn Wright	135	532	83	171	.321	22	126	2
OF	Babe Herman	153	614	143	241	.393	35	130	18
OF	Johnny Frederick	142	616	120	206	.334	17	76	1
OF	Rube Bressler	109	335	53	100	.299	3	52	4

==== Other batters ====
Note: G = Games played; AB = At bats; R = Runs; H = Hits; Avg. = Batting average; HR = Home runs; RBI = Runs batted in; SB = Stolen bases

Player	G	AB	R	H	Avg.	HR	RBI	SB
Jake Flowers	89	253	37	81	.320	2	50	5
Eddie Moore	76	196	24	55	.281	1	20	1
Harvey Hendrick	68	167	29	43	.257	5	28	2
Ike Boone	40	101	13	30	.297	3	13	0
Hank DeBerry	35	95	11	28	.295	0	14	0
Val Picinich	23	46	4	10	.217	0	3	1
Hal Lee	22	37	5	6	.162	1	4	0
Gordon Slade	25	37	8	8	.216	1	2	0
Jack Warner	21	25	4	8	.320	0	0	1

=== Pitching ===
= Indicates league leader

==== Starting pitchers ====
Note: G = Games pitched; GS = Games started; CG = Complete games; IP = Innings pitched; W = Wins; L = Losses; ERA = Earned run average; BB = Bases on balls; SO = Strikeouts

Player	G	GS	CG	IP	W	L	ERA	BB	SO
Dazzy Vance	35	31	20	258.2	17	15	2.61	55	173
Dolf Luque	31	24	16	199.0	14	8	4.30	58	62
Ray Phelps	36	24	11	179.2	14	7	4.11	52	64

==== Other pitchers ====
Note: G = Games pitched; GS = Games started; CG = Complete games; IP = Innings pitched; W = Wins; L = Losses; ERA = Earned run average; BB = Bases on balls; SO = Strikeouts

Player	G	GS	CG	IP	W	L	ERA	BB	SO
Watty Clark	44	24	9	200.0	13	13	4.18	38	81
Jumbo Elliott	35	21	6	198.1	10	7	3.95	70	59
Ray Moss	36	11	5	118.1	9	6	5.10	55	30
Sloppy Thurston	24	11	5	106.0	6	4	3.40	17	26
Clise Dudley	21	7	2	66.2	2	4	6.35	27	18
Jim Faulkner	2	1	0	0.1	0	0	81.00	1	0

==== Relief pitchers ====
Note: G = Games pitched; IP = Innings pitched; W = Wins; L = Losses; SV = Saves; ERA = Earned run average; BB = Bases on balls; SO = Strikeouts

Player	G	IP	W	L	SV	ERA	BB	SO
Johnny Morrison	16	34.2	1	2	1	5.45	16	11
Fred Heimach	9	7.1	0	2	2	4.91	3	1
Bobo Newsom	2	3	0	0	0	0.00	2	1
Cy Moore	1	0	0	0	0	----	0	0

== Awards and honors ==
=== League top five finishers ===
Babe Herman

- #2 in NL in batting average (.393)
- #2 in NL in on-base percentage (.455)
- #3 in NL in slugging percentage (.678)
- #3 in NL in doubles (48)
- #4 in NL in RBI (130)

Dazzy Vance

- Led NL in ERA (2.61)
- #3 in NL in strikeouts (173)
