= Spades Wood =

American baseball player (1909–1986)

- Pitcher
- Born: January 13, 1909; Spartanburg, South Carolina, U.S.
- Died: May 18, 1986 (aged 77); Wichita, Kansas, U.S.
- Batted: Left Threw: Left

MLB debut
- August 16, 1930, for the Pittsburgh Pirates

Last MLB appearance
- September 21, 1931, for the Pittsburgh Pirates

MLB statistics
- Win–loss record: 6-9
- Strikeouts: 56
- Earned run average: 5.61
- Stats at Baseball Reference

Teams
- Pittsburgh Pirates (1930–31)

Charles Asher "Spades" Wood (January 13, 1909 – May 18, 1986) was an American professional baseball pitcher. He attended Wofford College and played two seasons in Major League Baseball from 1930 to 1931 for the Pittsburgh Pirates.
