= Bernie Walter =

American baseball player (1908–1988)

- Pitcher
- Born: August 15, 1908; Dover, Tennessee, U.S.
- Died: October 30, 1988 (aged 80); Nashville, Tennessee, U.S.
- Batted: Right Threw: Right

MLB debut
- August 16, 1930, for the Pittsburgh Pirates

Last MLB appearance
- August 16, 1930, for the Pittsburgh Pirates

MLB statistics
- Win–loss record: 0–0
- Earned run average: 0.00
- Strikeouts: 1
- Stats at Baseball Reference

Teams
- Pittsburgh Pirates (1930)

James Bernard Walter (August 15, 1908 – October 30, 1988) was a Major League Baseball pitcher who played in 1930 with the Pittsburgh Pirates. He batted and threw right-handed.

He was born in Dover, Tennessee and died in Nashville, Tennessee.
