= Owen Kahn =

American baseball player (1903-1981)

- Pinch runner
- Born: June 15, 1903; Richmond, Virginia, U.S.
- Died: January 17, 1981 (aged 77); Richmond, Virginia, U.S.
- Batted: Right Threw: Right

MLB debut
- May 24, 1930, for the Boston Braves

Last MLB appearance
- May 24, 1930, for the Boston Braves

MLB statistics
- Games played: 1
- At bats: 0
- Runs scored: 1
- Stats at Baseball Reference

Teams
- Boston Braves (1930)

Owen Earle Kahn (June 15, 1903 - January 17, 1981) was an American Major League Baseball player. He played in one game for the Boston Braves in 1930, serving as a pinch runner and scoring a run in his only major league appearance.

Kahn's professional career began in 1927 as a shortstop for the Marshalltown Ansons of the Mississippi Valley League. Prior to the 1930 season, Kahn was purchased by the Braves from the Manchester Blue Sox of the New England League. At that point in his career, Kahn was primarily a third baseman, but he never played a fielding position in the majors.

Kahn made his only major league appearance on May 24, when he pinch-ran for George Sisler in a game against the Brooklyn Robins. After scoring, he was replaced in the field by Billy Rhiel. On June 9, Kahn's contract was sold to the Pittsfield Hillies of the Eastern League. He continued to play in the minors until 1933, ending his career with the Wilmington Pirates.

== Sources ==
- Career statistics from Baseball Reference · Baseball Reference (Minors) · Retrosheet · Baseball Almanac
