= Bernie James (baseball) =

American baseball player (1905-1994)

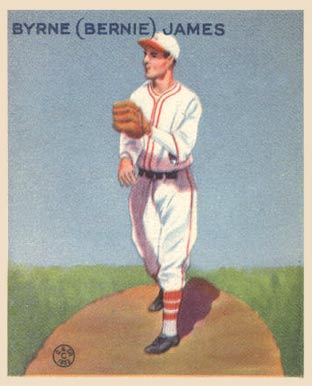
- James in 1933
- Infielder
- Born: September 2, 1905; Angleton, Texas, U.S.
- Died: August 1, 1994 (aged 88); San Antonio, Texas, U.S.
- Batted: Switch Threw: Right

MLB debut
- April 24, 1929, for the Boston Braves

Last MLB appearance
- October 1, 1933, for the New York Giants

MLB statistics
- Batting average: .257
- Home runs: 1
- Runs batted in: 20
- Stats at Baseball Reference

Teams
- Boston Braves (1929–1930); New York Giants (1933)

Robert Byrne James (September 2, 1905 – August 1, 1994) was an American Major League Baseball infielder who played three seasons for the Boston Braves and New York Giants in the National League from 1929 to 1930 and 1933.

In 114 games over three seasons, James posted a .257 batting average (61-for-237) with 35 runs, 1 home run, 20 RBI and 8 stolen bases. Defensively, he recorded an overall .943 fielding percentage.
