= Jim Spotts =

American baseball player (1909-1964)

- Catcher
- Born: April 10, 1909; Honey Brook, Pennsylvania, U.S.
- Died: June 15, 1964 (aged 55); Medford, New Jersey, U.S.
- Batted: Right Threw: Right

MLB debut
- April 23, 1930, for the Philadelphia Phillies

Last MLB appearance
- June 22, 1930, for the Philadelphia Phillies

MLB statistics
- Games played: 3
- At bats: 2
- Hits: 0
- Stats at Baseball Reference

Teams
- Philadelphia Phillies (1930)

James Russell Spotts (April 10, 1909 – June 15, 1964) was an American Major League Baseball catcher.

== Life and career ==
Spotts played for the Philadelphia Phillies in 1930. In three games, Spotts had no hits in two at-bats. He batted and threw right-handed.

Spotts was born in Honey Brook, Pennsylvania, and died in Medford, New Jersey.
