= Stu Clarke =

American baseball player (1906–1985)

- Shortstop
- Born: January 24, 1906; San Francisco, California
- Died: August 26, 1985 (aged 79); Hayward, California
- Batted: Right Threw: Right

MLB debut
- July 12, 1929, for the Pittsburgh Pirates

Last MLB appearance
- May 8, 1930, for the Pittsburgh Pirates

MLB statistics
- Batting average: .273
- Home runs: 2
- Runs batted in: 23
- Stats at Baseball Reference

Teams
- Pittsburgh Pirates (1929–1930)

William Stuart Clarke (January 24, 1906 – August 26, 1985) was a Major League Baseball shortstop who played for the Pittsburgh Pirates in 1929 and 1930.
