= Al Grabowski =

American baseball player (1901–1966)

- Pitcher
- Born: September 4, 1901; Syracuse, New York, U.S.
- Died: October 29, 1966 (aged 65); Memphis, New York, U.S.
- Batted: Left Threw: Left

MLB debut
- September 11, 1929, for the St. Louis Cardinals

Last MLB appearance
- September 19, 1930, for the St. Louis Cardinals

MLB statistics
- Win–loss record: 9-6
- Earned run average: 4.07
- Strikeouts: 65
- Stats at Baseball Reference

Teams
- St. Louis Cardinals (1929–1930)

Alfons Francis Grabowski (September 4, 1901 – October 29, 1966) was an American pitcher in Major League Baseball. He played for the St. Louis Cardinals.

He was an exceptional hitting pitcher in his brief stint in the majors, posting a .327 batting average (16-for-49) with 10 runs, 4 doubles, 1 triple and 6 RBI in 39 games pitched.
