= Hal Haid =

American baseball player (1897–1952)

- Pitcher
- Born: December 21, 1897; Barberton, Ohio, U.S.
- Died: August 13, 1952 (aged 54); Los Angeles, California, U.S.
- Batted: Right Threw: Right

MLB debut
- September 19, 1919, for the St. Louis Browns

Last MLB appearance
- August 25, 1933, for the Chicago White Sox

MLB statistics
- Win–loss record: 14–15
- Earned run average: 4.16
- Strikeouts: 103
- Stats at Baseball Reference

Teams
- St. Louis Browns (1919); St. Louis Cardinals (1928–1930); Boston Braves (1931); Chicago White Sox (1932)

Career highlights and awards
- National League pennant: 1928, 1930

Harold Augustine Haid (December 21, 1897 – August 13, 1952) was an American professional baseball player. He was a right-handed pitcher over parts of six seasons (1919, 1928–1931, 1933) with the St. Louis Browns, St. Louis Cardinals, Boston Braves and Chicago White Sox. For his career, he compiled a 14–15 record in 119 appearances, most as a relief pitcher, with a 4.16 earned run average and 103 strikeouts.

An alumnus of Belmont Abbey College, Haid was born in Barberton, Ohio and later died in Los Angeles at the age of 54.

== See also ==
- List of Major League Baseball annual saves leaders
