= Andy Bednar =

American baseball player (1908–1937)

- Pitcher
- Born: August 16, 1908; Streator, Illinois
- Died: November 26, 1937 (aged 29); Graham, Texas
- Batted: Right Threw: Right

MLB debut
- September 6, 1930, for the Pittsburgh Pirates

Last MLB appearance
- May 3, 1931, for the Pittsburgh Pirates

MLB statistics
- Win–loss record: 0–0
- Earned run average: 15.19
- Strikeouts: 3
- Stats at Baseball Reference

Teams
- Pittsburgh Pirates (1930–1931)

Andrew Jackson Bednar (August 16, 1908 – November 26, 1937) was an American professional baseball pitcher. He played in Major League Baseball (MLB) during the 1930 and 1931 seasons for the Pittsburgh Pirates. Bednar died 20 miles (32 km) from Graham, Texas on November 26, 1937 when his car flipped. He was en route to Caddo, Texas to begin work on an oil well there, two years after leaving baseball due to arm injuries. His body would be returned to Nokomis, Illinois, where it would be buried.
