= Ken Jones (baseball) =

American baseball player (1903–1991)

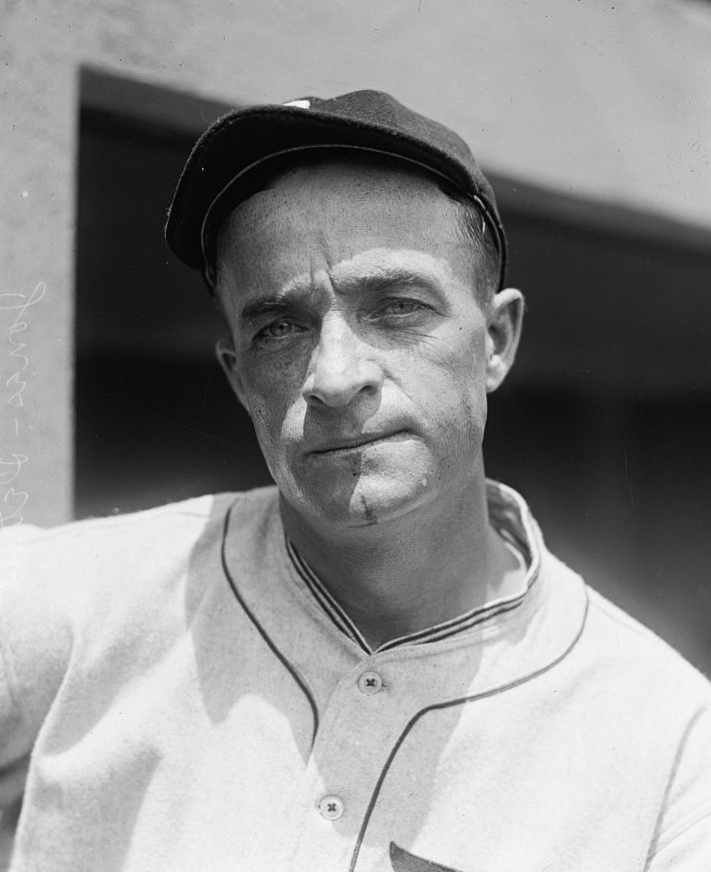
- Pitcher
- Born: April 13, 1903; Dover, New Jersey, U.S.
- Died: May 15, 1991 (aged 88); Hartford, Connecticut, U.S.
- Batted: Right Threw: Right

MLB debut
- May 19, 1924, for the Detroit Tigers

Last MLB appearance
- September 17, 1930, for the Boston Braves

MLB statistics
- Win–loss: 0-1
- Earned run average: 5.40
- Strikeouts: 4
- Stats at Baseball Reference

Teams
- Detroit Tigers (1924); Boston Braves (1930)

Kenneth Frederick Jones (April 13, 1903 – May 15, 1991), nicknamed "Broadway", was an American professional baseball player.

== Life ==
An alumnus of Georgetown University, he was born in Dover, New Jersey and died in Hartford, Connecticut at the age of 88.

== Career ==
He was a right-handed pitcher over parts of two seasons (1924, 1930) with the Detroit Tigers and Boston Braves. For his career, he compiled a 0–1 record, with a 5.40 earned run average, and 4 strikeouts in 21 2/3 innings pitched.
