= Chick Tolson =

American baseball player (1895–1965)

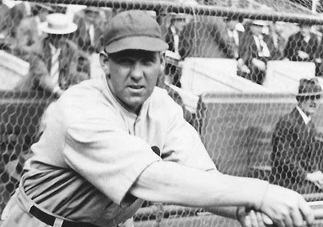
- Tolson, circa 1929
- First baseman
- Born: May 3, 1895; Washington, D.C., U.S.
- Died: April 16, 1965 (aged 69); Washington, D.C., U.S.
- Batted: Right Threw: Right

MLB debut
- July 3, 1925, for the Cleveland Indians

Last MLB appearance
- August 16, 1930, for the Chicago Cubs

MLB statistics
- Batting average: .284
- Home runs: 4
- Runs batted in: 45
- Stats at Baseball Reference

Teams
- Cleveland Indians (1925); Chicago Cubs (1926–1927, 1929–1930)

Charles Julius "Chick" Tolson (May 3, 1895 – April 16, 1965) was an American professional baseball player who played first base in the Major Leagues over parts of five seasons from 1925 to 1930, for the Chicago Cubs and Cleveland Indians.

In 144 games over five seasons, Tolson posted a .284 batting average (78-for-275) with 23 runs, 4 home runs and 45 RBIs. Defensively, he recorded a .985 fielding percentage playing every inning in the majors at first base.
