= Ray Phelps =

American baseball player (1903–1971)

- Pitcher
- Born: December 11, 1903; Dunlap, Tennessee, U.S.
- Died: July 7, 1971 (aged 67); Fort Pierce, Florida, U.S.
- Batted: Right Threw: Right

MLB debut
- April 23, 1930, for the Brooklyn Robins

Last MLB appearance
- June 28, 1936, for the Chicago White Sox

MLB statistics
- Win–loss record: 33–35
- Earned run average: 4.93
- Strikeouts: 190
- Stats at Baseball Reference

Teams
- Brooklyn Robins/Dodgers (1930–1932); Chicago White Sox (1935–1936)

Raymond Clifford Phelps (December 11, 1903 – July 7, 1971) was an American professional baseball pitcher in Major League Baseball. He pitched from 1930 to 1936.
