= William Bell Jr. (baseball) =

American baseball player (1930–2021)

William Bell, Jr.
- Pitcher
- Born: July 30, 1930; Des Moines, Iowa, U.S.
- Died: March 6, 2021 (aged 90); Des Moines, Iowa, U.S.
- Batted: Left Threw: Left

Teams
- Kansas City Monarchs (1949–1951; 1954); Birmingham Black Barons (1950)

William Bell Jr. (July 30, 1930 – March 6, 2021) was an American pitcher who played in the Negro American League in all or part of four seasons spanning from 1949 to 1954. Born in Des Moines, Iowa, he batted and threw left handed.

== Career ==
'Bill Lefty', as he was nicknamed, was renowned for his ability to work the corners of the plate. He started his career with the Kansas City Monarchs in 1949, pitching with both the Monarchs and the Birmingham Black Barons in 1950 and continuing with the Monarchs until early 1951, when his career was interrupted for military service in the Korean War from 1951 to 1953.

During service, Bell continued to pitching in games that were played between mixed teams of whites and blacks. Among others, he had teammates like Vernon Law and Syd Thrift, both Pittsburgh Pirates pitchers, as well as New York Giants outfielder Willie Mays. Following his discharge, Bell pitched briefly for the Monarchs in 1954.

In 2008, Major League Baseball staged a special draft of the surviving Negro league players, doing a tribute for the surviving Negro leaguers who were kept out of the Big Leagues because of their race. Hall of Fame Baseball player Dave Winfield hatched the idea to have this draft, which was held before the 2008 MLB draft. MLB clubs each selected a former NLB player, and Bell was drafted as a pitcher by the Minnesota Twins.

== Personal life ==
After his baseball days, Bell returned to his hometown of Des Moines, Iowa and worked in the U.S. Postal Service, serving in various supervisory and management positions during 34 years. In addition, he was the co-chairman of the Committee for Better Race Relations at Des Moines East High School between 1972 and 1974.

Besides, Bell coached a local youth baseball team in the Babe Ruth League for three years, and guided the squad to one Iowa State tournament title.

Bell died on March 6, 2021, at the age of 90.
