= Jim Mosolf =

American baseball player (1905–1979)

- Outfielder
- Born: August 21, 1905; Puyallup, Washington
- Died: December 28, 1979 (aged 74); Dallas, Oregon
- Batted: Left Threw: Right

MLB debut
- September 9, 1929, for the Pittsburgh Pirates

Last MLB appearance
- September 19, 1933, for the Chicago Cubs

MLB statistics
- Batting average: .295
- Home runs: 2
- Runs batted in: 28
- Stats at Baseball Reference

Teams
- Pittsburgh Pirates (1929–1931); Chicago Cubs (1933)

James Frederick Mosolf (August 21, 1905 – December 28, 1979) was an outfielder in Major League Baseball. He played for the Pittsburgh Pirates and Chicago Cubs.

In 118 games over four seasons, Mosolf posted a .295 batting average (56-for-190) with 39 runs, 2 home runs and 28 RBI.
