= Bruce Cunningham =

American baseball player (1905–1984)

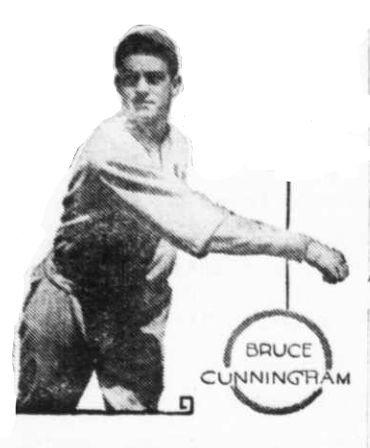
- Pitcher
- Born: September 29, 1905; San Francisco
- Died: March 8, 1984 (aged 78); Hayward, California
- Batted: Right Threw: Right

MLB debut
- May 7, 1929, for the Boston Braves

Last MLB appearance
- August 5, 1932, for the Boston Braves

MLB statistics
- Earned run average: 4.64
- Win–loss record: 13–24
- Stats at Baseball Reference

Teams
- Boston Braves (1929–1932)

Bruce Lee Cunningham (September 29, 1905, San Francisco – March 8, 1984, Hayward, California) was a Major League Baseball pitcher from 1929-1932 for the Boston Braves.
