= Bob Osborn =

American baseball player (1903–1960)

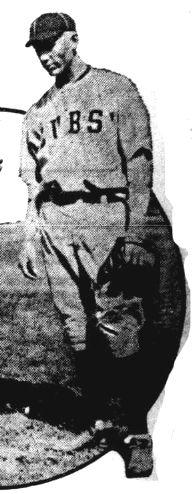
- Pitcher
- Born: April 17, 1903; San Diego, Texas, U.S.
- Died: April 19, 1960 (aged 57); Paris, Arkansas, U.S.
- Batted: Right Threw: Right

MLB debut
- September 16, 1925, for the Chicago Cubs

Last MLB appearance
- September 24, 1931, for the Pittsburgh Pirates

MLB statistics
- Win–loss record: 27–17
- Earned run average: 4.32
- Strikeouts: 140
- Stats at Baseball Reference

Teams
- Chicago Cubs (1925–1927, 1929–1930); Pittsburgh Pirates (1931)

John Bode "Bob" Osborn (April 17, 1903 – April 19, 1960) was an American professional baseball player and right-handed pitcher who appeared in 121 games pitched, 43 as a starter, for the Chicago Cubs and Pittsburgh Pirates in six seasons (1925–1927 and 1929–1931). Born in San Diego, Texas, he was listed as 6 feet 1 inch (1.85 m) tall and 175 pounds (79 kg).

On May 17, 1927, Osborn was called into a game between the Cubs and Boston at Braves Field in the ninth inning of a 3–3 tie. He proceeded to throw 14 shutout frames of relief, allowing six hits and two bases on balls (and going 2-for-5 at the plate). The game was decided in the visitors' half of the 22nd inning, when Charlie Grimm put Chicago ahead with an RBI single. When Osborn retired Boston in order in the bottom half of the 22nd, he earned the 4–3 triumph.

In his six MLB seasons, Osborn compiled a 27–17 won–lost record, two saves, and 4.32 career earned run average. In 4461/3 innings pitched, he allowed 528 hits and 181 bases on balls, with 140 strikeouts. He retired from baseball after the 1931 season.

He died in Paris, Arkansas, in 1960, two days after his 57th birthday.
