= Frank Dezelan =

American baseball umpire (1929–2011)

- Born: December 29, 1929; Johnstown, Pennsylvania, U.S.
- Died: March 7, 2011 (aged 81); Monroeville, Pennsylvania, U.S.
- Occupation: Umpire
- Years active: 1966–1970
- Employer: National League

Frank John Dezelan (December 29, 1929 – March 7, 2011) was an American umpire in Major League Baseball who worked in the National League for five seasons between September 23, 1966, and October 1, 1970. He was born in Johnstown, Pennsylvania.

Born to immigrants from Slovenia who settled in Johnstown, Dezelan served in the United States Navy during the Korean War. He played baseball during military service, and on the sandlots of Cambria County. He spent thirteen years umpiring in professional baseball, before ending his career due to a brain tumor.

While being treated by his dentist, Richard Goldberg, Frank discussed his love of baseball, and Goldberg suggested that he become an umpire. Dezelan decided to heed the advice and was accepted into the Al Somers Academy of Professional Umpiring in Daytona Beach, Florida.

After graduating in 1958, Dezelan began his umpiring career in the Northern League that year and returned for the 1959 season. Dezelan moved up to the South Atlantic League in 1960 and 1961 and to the Pacific Coast League from 1962 to 1963. He then worked in the Southern League in 1964 and 1965 and in the International League from 1966 through 1968. In addition, he would be an umpire in the National League for the last weeks of the season from 1966 to 1968, then full-time from 1969 to 1970. He officiated in 370 NL games. When the National League umpires began wearing numbers in 1970, Dezelan was assigned number 6.

Frank Dezelan worked with some of the baseball greats, including Roberto Clemente, Hank Aaron, and Willie Mays. Dezelan had the home plate when Mays hit his 600th home run on September 22, 1969. Dezelan umpired during the All Star Game at the new Riverfront Stadium in Cincinnati, Ohio on July 14, 1970. This game was a victory for the National League, and the first MLB All Star Game played at night. The most memorable moment of the game was the final run, scored in the 12th inning when Pete Rose slid into the plate, knocked the catcher, Ray Fosse over, causing him to drop the ball, which enabled the game-winning run.

Dezelan's umpiring career ended after he was diagnosed with a brain tumor at the age of 42. Frank Dezelan died in Monroeville, Pennsylvania, at the age of 81. He is noted in the archives of The Baseball Hall of Fame in Cooperstown, New York.
