= John Milligan (baseball) =

American baseball player (1904-1972)

- Pitcher
- Born: January 22, 1904; Schuylerville, New York, U.S.
- Died: May 15, 1972 (aged 68); Fort Pierce, Florida, U.S.
- Batted: Right Threw: Left

MLB debut
- August 11, 1928, for the Philadelphia Phillies

Last MLB appearance
- June 23, 1934, for the Washington Senators

MLB statistics
- Win–loss record: 3–8
- Earned run average: 5.17
- Strikeouts: 38
- Stats at Baseball Reference

Teams
- Philadelphia Phillies (1928–1931); Washington Senators (1934)

John Alexander Milligan (January 22, 1904 – May 15, 1972) was an American pitcher in Major League Baseball who played from 1928 through 1934 for the Philadelphia Phillies (1928–1931) and Washington Senators (1934). Listed at 5 ft 10 in (1.78 m), 172 lb., Milligan batted left-handed and threw right-handed. A native of Schuylerville, New York, he attended Cornell University.

In a five-season career, Mulligan posted a 3–8 record with 38 strikeouts and a 5.17 earned run average in 35 appearances, including 12 starts, four complete games and 116 2/3 innings of work.

Milligan died at the age of 68 in Fort Pierce, Florida.
