= Francis Healy (baseball) =

American baseball player (1910–1997)

- Catcher
- Born: July 29, 1910; Holyoke, Massachusetts, U.S.
- Died: February 12, 1997 (aged 86); Springfield, Massachusetts, U.S.
- Batted: Right Threw: Right

MLB debut
- April 29, 1930, for the New York Giants

Last MLB appearance
- September 26, 1934, for the St. Louis Cardinals

MLB statistics
- Batting average: .241
- Home runs: 0
- Runs batted in: 5
- Stats at Baseball Reference

Teams
- New York Giants (1930–32); St. Louis Cardinals (1934)

Francis Xavier Paul Healy (July 29, 1910 – February 12, 1997) was an American Major League Baseball catcher who played in parts of four seasons for the New York Giants and St. Louis Cardinals. He made it into 15 games for the 1934 World Series winners, mostly as a pinch hitter, but did not play in the series.

Healy is the uncle of former major-league catcher and broadcaster Fran Healy.

== Sources ==
- Career statistics from Baseball Reference · Baseball Reference (Minors) · Retrosheet · Baseball Almanac
