= Sam Jackson (second baseman) =

English baseball player (1849–1930)

- Second baseman
- Born: March 24, 1849; Ripon, England
- Died: August 4, 1930 (aged 81); Clifton Springs, New York
- Batted: Right Threw: Right

MLB debut
- May 9, 1871, for the Boston Red Stockings

Last MLB appearance
- May 7, 1872, for the Brooklyn Atlantics

MLB statistics
- Batting average: .216
- Runs scored: 17
- Runs batted in: 11
- Stats at Baseball Reference

Teams
- Boston Red Stockings (1871); Brooklyn Atlantics (1872)

Samuel Jackson (March 24, 1849 – August 4, 1930) was an English born professional baseball player. He played second base for the 1871 Boston Red Stockings and the 1872 Brooklyn Atlantics of the National Association.
