= Doc Marshall (infielder) =

American baseball player (1906-1999)

- Infielder
- Born: June 4, 1906; New Albany, Mississippi, U.S.
- Died: September 1, 1999 (aged 93); Lake San Marcos, California, U.S.
- Batted: Right Threw: Right

MLB debut
- September 28, 1929, for the New York Giants

Last MLB appearance
- September 3, 1932, for the New York Giants

MLB statistics
- Batting average: .258
- Home runs: 0
- Runs batted in: 61
- Stats at Baseball Reference

Teams
- New York Giants (1929–1932)

Edward Harbert "Doc" Marshall (June 4, 1906 – September 1, 1999) was an American infielder in Major League Baseball. He played for the New York Giants from 1929 to 1932.
