= 1930 in baseball =

The following are the baseball events of the year 1930 throughout the world.

== Champions ==
- World Series: Philadelphia Athletics over St. Louis Cardinals (4–2)
- NNL Championship Series: St. Louis Stars over Detroit Stars (4–3)

== Statistical leaders ==
	American League		National League		Negro National League	
Stat	Player	Total	Player	Total	Player	Total
AVG	Al Simmons (PHA)	.381	Bill Terry (NYG)	.401	Willie Wells^{3} (SLS)	.411
HR	Babe Ruth (NYY)	49	Hack Wilson (CHC)	56	Willie Wells^{3} (SLS)	17
RBI	Lou Gehrig (NYY)	173	Hack Wilson^{2} (CHC)	191	Willie Wells^{3} (SLS)	114
W	Lefty Grove^{1} (PHA)	28	Ray Kremer (PIT); Pat Malone (CHC)	20	Logan Hensley (SLS)	19
ERA	Lefty Grove^{1} (PHA)	2.54	Dazzy Vance (BRO)	2.61	Ted Radcliffe (SLS)	2.58
K	Lefty Grove^{1} (PHA)	209	Bill Hallahan (STL)	177	Bill Foster (CAG)	133

^{1} Major league Triple Crown pitching winner
^{2} All-time single-season runs batted in record
^{3} Negro National League Triple Crown batting winner

== Major league baseball final standings ==
=== American League final standings ===
American League
Team	W	L	Pct.	GB	Home	Road
Philadelphia Athletics	102	52	.662	—	58‍–‍18	44‍–‍34
Washington Senators	94	60	.610	8	56‍–‍21	38‍–‍39
New York Yankees	86	68	.558	16	47‍–‍29	39‍–‍39
Cleveland Indians	81	73	.526	21	44‍–‍33	37‍–‍40
Detroit Tigers	75	79	.487	27	45‍–‍33	30‍–‍46
St. Louis Browns	64	90	.416	38	38‍–‍40	26‍–‍50
Chicago White Sox	62	92	.403	40	34‍–‍44	28‍–‍48
Boston Red Sox	52	102	.338	50	30‍–‍46	22‍–‍56

Locations of teams for the 1923–1931 American League seasons
American League

=== National League final standings ===
National League
Team	W	L	Pct.	GB	Home	Road
St. Louis Cardinals	92	62	.597	—	53‍–‍24	39‍–‍38
Chicago Cubs	90	64	.584	2	51‍–‍26	39‍–‍38
New York Giants	87	67	.565	5	46‍–‍31	41‍–‍36
Brooklyn Robins	86	68	.558	6	49‍–‍28	37‍–‍40
Pittsburgh Pirates	80	74	.519	12	42‍–‍35	38‍–‍39
Boston Braves	70	84	.455	22	39‍–‍38	31‍–‍46
Cincinnati Reds	59	95	.383	33	37‍–‍40	22‍–‍55
Philadelphia Phillies	52	102	.338	40	35‍–‍42	17‍–‍60

Locations of teams for the 1920–1931 National League seasons
National League

== Negro leagues final standings ==
All Negro leagues standings below are per MLB and Seamheads.

=== Negro National League final standings ===
This was the eleventh of twelve seasons of the original Negro National League. This was the sixth split-season and fifth season in which a playoff was held to determine the pennant, for which the first half leader would be matched against the second half winner. St. Louis won the first half while Detroit won the second half. As such, they met for a best-of-seven Championship Series. The playoff was held September 13–22 and would see St. Louis would win the series in seven games to win their second pennant, their second ever in three years.

vs. Negro National League						vs. Major Black teams			
Negro National League	W	L	T	Pct.	GB	W	L	T	Pct.
^{(1)} St. Louis Stars	65	22	1	.744	—	74	27	1	.730
Kansas City Monarchs	35	23	0	.603	15½	40	37	0	.519
^{(2)} Detroit Stars	47	33	0	.588	14½	54	41	0	.568
Chicago American Giants	43	46	0	.483	23	53	55	0	.491
Birmingham Black Barons	42	47	2	.473	24	46	50	2	.480
Memphis Red Sox	28	40	0	.412	27½	33	54	1	.381
Cuban Stars (West)	21	37	0	.362	29½	24	39	0	.381
Nashville Elite Giants	20	53	1	.277	38	28	58	1	.328

^{(1)} First half champion ^{(2)} Second half champion

Locations of teams for the 1930 Negro National League season
Negro National League
Traveling team: Cuban Stars

=== Independent teams final standings ===
A loose confederation of teams were gathered mostly in the East to compete with the West, however East teams did not organize a formal league as the West did.

vs. All Teams
Independent Clubs	W	L	T	Pct.	GB
Homestead Grays	44	15	1	.742	—
New York Lincoln Giants	41	14	1	.741	1
Baltimore Black Sox	24	20	2	.543	12½
Louisville Black Caps	16	28	0	.364	20½
Stars of Cuba	5	13	0	.278	18½
Hilldale Club	8	30	1	.218	25½
Brooklyn Royal Giants	2	11	0	.154	19

=== Negro league postseason ===
By 1930, there had been no organized league for East Coast baseball in the Negro leagues (owing to the dissolution of the Eastern Colored League in 1928 and American Negro League in 1929). The remaining teams from the ANL and ECL played independent ball together, but they also played against teams from the Midwest. As such, the Homestead Grays challenged two teams from the NNL two distinct Series that were held over various stadiums and dates. The Grays challenged the St. Louis Stars in St. Louis on April 19 and April 22 and won twice. They challenged the Detroit Stars to four games held from August 21 to August 28 (two in Akron and two in Detroit), which Homestead won three. On August 30–September 3, they challenged the Stars to five games (all in St. Louis), and the Stars won four of five. At any rate, the independent East teams then had an "East Coast Championship Series", which matched the Grays and the New York Lincoln Giants (in that same month, the Negro National League had their Championship Series), with ten games spread out over Pittsburgh, New York, and Philadelphia.

- 1930 East Coast Championship Series: Homestead Grays over New York Lincoln Giants, 6–4
- 1930 Negro National League Championship Series: St. Louis Stars over Detroit Stars, 4–3

== Events ==
=== January–June ===
- April 14 – The 1930 season opens with the Boston Red Sox defeating the Washington Senators 4–3 at Griffith Stadium.
- April 27 – Chicago White Sox first baseman Bud Clancy is the first player at first base since Al McCauley of Washington (American Association) in 1891 to have no chances in a nine-inning game.
- April 29 – Lefty Gomez pitches four innings and takes the loss in his major league debut.
- May 6 – The Boston Red Sox trade Red Ruffing to the New York Yankees for Cedric Durst and $50,000.
- May 9 – The Detroit Tigers defeat the New York Yankees 5–4 at Yankee Stadium. They set a record with only two outfield putouts.
- May 11 – The Cleveland Indians defeat the Philadelphia Athletics 25–7.
- May 12 – New York Giants pitcher Larry Benton surrenders six home runs to the Chicago Cubs, yet still gets the win.
- May 30 – The New York Yankees trade Waite Hoyt and Mark Koenig to the Detroit Tigers for Ownie Carroll, Harry Rice and Yats Wuestling.
- June 13 – The St. Louis Browns trade General Crowder and Heinie Manush to the Washington Senators for Goose Goslin.

=== July–September ===
- July 8 – The New York Yankees are shut out, 4–0, by Rube Walberg and the Philadelphia Athletics. It is the Yankees' seventh loss in a row, and second shut out in that stretch (July 4 against the Washington Senators). They are the only two shut outs the Yankees suffer all season.
- July 23–24 – On consecutive days in July 1930, the Philadelphia Phillies managed to score 15 runs in a game but were losers in both games. On July 23, the Phillies lost to the Pittsburgh Pirates 16–15, and on July 24, they lost to the Chicago Cubs 19–15. The July 24 game still holds the record for the most runs scored in a game without a home run.
- August 31 – The St. Louis Cardinals defeat the first place Chicago Cubs, 8–3. In the final 26 games of the season, the Cards go 22–4, and from fourth place in the National League to first.
- September 10 – Hall of fame shortstop Luke Appling goes one-for-four in his major league debut as his Chicago White Sox fall 6–2 to the Boston Red Sox.
- September 12 – Brooklyn Robins catcher Al López bounces one over the left field wall for his sixth home run of the season. It is the last such home run before the implementation of the ground rule double.

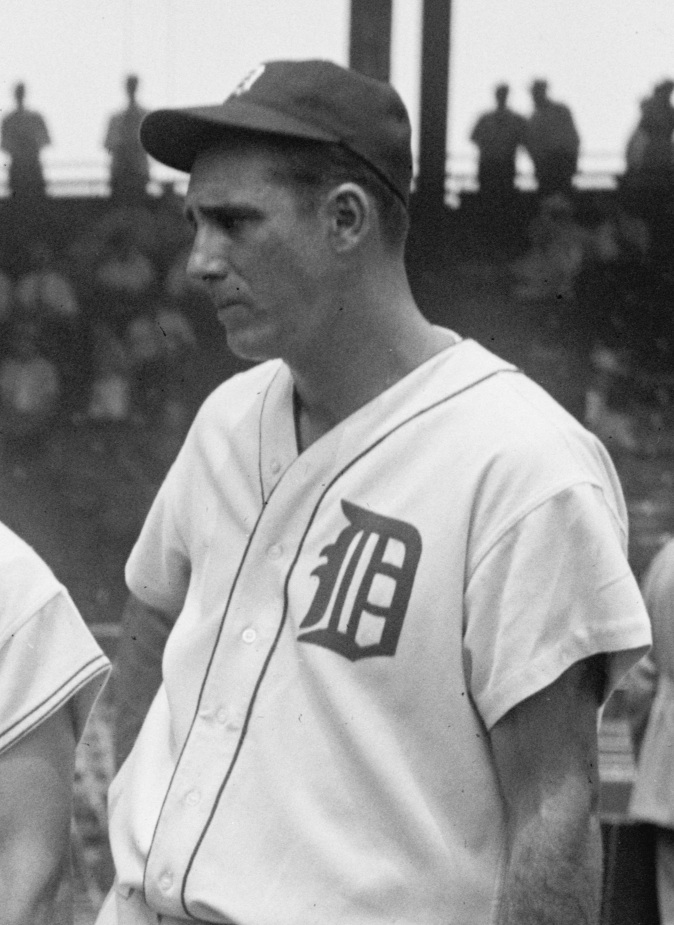
Hank Greenberg, Hall of Famer and 2-time MVP

- September 14 – Detroit Tigers Hall of famer Hank Greenberg makes his major league debut in a 10–3 loss to the New York Yankees.
- September 20 – Bill Terry goes four-for-five in the first game of a double header and two-for-four in the second to raise his season average to .402. He goes five-for-seven in a double header the next day to see his average go as high as .406. He ends the season with a .401 batting average. He is the last National Leaguer to bat over .400.
- September 28
  - Dizzy Dean gives up just three hits and one earned run in his major league debut to lead the St. Louis Cardinals to a 3–1 victory over the Pittsburgh Pirates.
  - Babe Ruth picks up a complete game victory against his former team, the Boston Red Sox on the final day of the season.

=== October–December ===
- October 1 – The Philadelphia Athletics defeat the St. Louis Cardinals 5–2 in game one of the 1930 World Series despite being out hit 9–5. All five hits by the A's are for extra bases (a double, two triples & two home runs).
- October 2 – A two out error by Cardinals second baseman Frankie Frisch leads to two unearned runs in the third inning as the A's cruise to a 6–1 victory in game two of the World Series.
- October 4 – Bill Hallahan gets out of a bases loaded jam in the first inning by striking out Bing Miller. From there, he settles in, and leads the Cardinals to a 5–0 victory in game three of the World Series.
- October 5 – Jimmie Dykes' throwing error in the fourth leads to two unearned runs as the Cardinals even up the series with a 3–1 victory.
- October 6 – Jimmie Foxx breaks open a scoreless game with a two-run home run in the ninth to give the A's the 2–0 victory in game five.
- October 8 – The Philadelphia Athletics defeated the St. Louis Cardinals, 7–1, in Game six of the World Series to win their second consecutive World championship, and fifth overall, four games to two. This would be the Athletics' last World Series championship in the city of Philadelphia.
- October 14 – The Chicago Cubs trade Bill McAfee and Wes Schulmerich to the Boston Braves for Bob Smith and Jimmy Welsh. In a separate transaction, they also purchase Jakie May's contract from the Cincinnati Reds.
- November 10 – Veteran pitcher Hippo Vaughn is reinstated by Judge Landis after eight years of ineligibility. Vaughn, who had lost a double no-hitter duel to Fred Toney in the 1917 season, had jumped the Chicago Cubs in 1922. Vaughn chose to pitch for a semi-professional team following a salary dispute with Chicago. He will go to spring training with the Cubs in 1931 but will fail to make the team at age 43.
- November 23 – At the Polo Grounds, St. Louis Browns outfielder Red Badgro, playing for the NFL New York Giants, catches a touchdown pass against the Green Bay Packers. It is the third TD catch of the season for Badgro, all from quarterback Benny Friedman. In 1981, Badgro will be elected to the Pro Football Hall of Fame.
- November 25 – The Sporting News, acting to fill the Most Valuable Player void, announces its selection of Washington Senators shortstop Joe Cronin in the American League and New York Giants first baseman Bill Terry in the National League.
- December 1 – Shano Collins, a native New Englander, is appointed manager of the perennial last-place Boston Red Sox.

== Births ==
=== January ===
- January 4 – Don McMahon
- January 13 – Joe Margoneri
- January 14 – Pete Daley
- January 23 – Frank Sullivan
- January 30 – Sandy Amorós

=== February ===
- February 1 – Chuck Churn
- February 5 – Eric Rodin
- February 13 – Al Grunwald
- February 17 – Roger Craig
- February 18 – Frank House
- February 22 – Lyle Luttrell
- February 23 – Beatrice Kemmerer
- February 26:
  - Vic Janowicz
  - Ron Negray
- February 28:
  - Frank Malzone
  - Dolan Nichols
  - Ron Samford

=== March ===
- March 5 – Del Crandall
- March 7 – Tom Acker
- March 8 – Bob Grim
- March 9 – Larry Raines
- March 11 – Bobby Winkles
- March 12 – Vern Law
- March 13 – Doug Harvey
- March 16 – Hobie Landrith
- March 25 – Rudy Minarcin

=== April ===
- April 2:
  - Art Ceccarelli
  - Gordon Jones
- April 3 – Wally Moon
- April 7 – Richie Myers
- April 10 – Frank Lary
- April 12 – Johnny Antonelli
- April 17 – Hattie Peterson
- April 28 – Tom Sturdivant

=== May ===
- May 1 – Stan Palys
- May 5 – Harley Grossman
- May 12 – Tom Umphlett
- May 20 – Tom Morgan
- May 21 – Rudy Regalado

=== June ===
- June 2 – Bob Lillis
- June 8 – Phil Paine
- June 12 – Dutch Rennert
- June 20 – Rod Graber
- June 24 – Neale Henderson
- June 25:
  - Memo Luna
  - Humberto Robinson
- June 27 – Bob Trowbridge

=== July ===
- July 2:
  - Pete Burnside
  - Jane Moffet
  - Magdalen Redman
- July 3:
  - Al Pilarcik
  - Jim Westlake
- July 4 – George Steinbrenner
- July 6:
  - Angelo LiPetri
  - Karl Olson
- July 8:
  - Glen Gorbous
  - Eddie Phillips
- July 10 – Beatrice Allard
- July 15 – Betty Wagoner
- July 17 – Jerry Lynch
- July 19 – Marcelino Solis
- July 21 – Danny Morejón
- July 26 – Glenn Mickens
- July 30:
  - William Bell Jr.
  - Gus Triandos

=== August ===
- August 4 – Gabe Gabler
- August 9:
  - Milt Bolling
  - Román Mejías
- August 11 – Josh Gibson, Jr.
- August 13:
  - Vinegar Bend Mizell
  - Jerry Neudecker
  - Bob Wiesler
- August 14:
  - Dale Coogan
  - Earl Weaver
- August 15 – Bob Martyn
- August 17 – Buck Varner
- August 22:
  - Frank Ernaga
  - Bob Speake
- August 23 – Zeke Bella
- August 29 – Dave Cole
- August 30 – Frances Vukovich

=== September ===
- September 1 – Dean Stone
- September 5 – Wayne Belardi
- September 16 – Ron Mrozinski
- September 17 – Jim Umbricht
- September 19:
  - Bob Turley
  - Billy Williams
- September 21:
  - Agnes Allen
  - Billy Muffett
- September 22 – Bob Harrison
- September 27 – Dick Hall
- September 28 – Audrey Deemer

=== October ===
- October 2:
  - John Gabler
  - Jim Heise
- October 9 – Barbara Anne Davis
- October 11 – Bill Fischer
- October 12 – Joe Trimble
- October 15 – Don Robertson
- October 19 – Joe Koppe
- October 20 – Bill Froats
- October 23 – Solly Drake
- October 30 – Don Nicholas

=== November ===
- November 4:
  - Dick Groat
  - Guy Morton
- November 6 – Bob Darnell
- November 8 – Mike Roarke
- November 10:
  - Gene Conley
  - Chick King
- November 15 – Harold Bevan
- November 16 – Paul Foytack
- November 19 – Joe Morgan
- November 20 – Don Leppert
- November 23 – Jack McKeon
- November 24 – Bob Friend

=== December ===
- December 4 – Harvey Kuenn
- December 6 – Barbara Berger
- December 7:
  - Mark Freeman
  - Hal Smith
- December 9 – Bob Hazle
- December 11:
  - Eddie O'Brien
  - Johnny O'Brien
  - Andy Varga
- December 12 – Raúl Sánchez
- December 15 – Haywood Sullivan
- December 18:
  - Mike Baxes
  - Moose Skowron
- December 20 – Troy Herriage
- December 21 – Danny Kravitz
- December 27 – Norm Larker
- December 29 – Frank Dezelan
- December 30 – Milt Graff

== Deaths ==
=== January ===
- January 8 – Charlie Flannigan, 38, third baseman/outfielder for the 1913 St. Louis Browns.
- January 20 – Jumbo Schoeneck, 57, first baseman for the Chicago Browns, Pittsburgh Stogies, Baltimore Monumentals and Indianapolis Hoosiers from 1884 to 1889, who finished in the top ten in 10 offensive categories of the Union Association in his rookie season.
- January 25 – Spencer Heath, 36, relief pitcher for the 1920 Chicago White Sox.
- January 30 – Rip Hagerman, 41, pitcher for the Chicago Cubs (1909) and Cleveland Indians (1914–1916).

=== February ===
- February 3 – Gus Sandberg, 34, backup catcher for the Cincinnati Reds from 1923 to 1924.
- February 13 – Dan Abbott, 67, pitcher for the 1890 Toledo Maumees.
- February 14 – Pete Kilduff, 36, second baseman for the New York Giants, Chicago Cubs and Brooklyn Robins from 1917 to 1921, who in the 1920 World Series became one of three outs in Bill Wambsganss's unassisted triple play, the only in Series history.

=== March ===
- March 11 – Bob Barr, 73, pitcher who played for six different teams of the American Association and National League between 1883 and 1891.
- March 12 – Jack Powell, 38, Major League Baseball pitcher
- March 15 – George Townsend, 62, catcher who played from 1887 to 1891 with the Philadelphia Athletics and Baltimore Orioles of the American Association.
- March 21 – Bill Fagan, pitcher for the New York Metropolitans (1887) and Kansas City Cowboys (1888) of the American Association.
- March 25 – Bill Krieg, 71, catcher/outfielder/third baseman for the St. Louis, Pittsburgh, Chicago, Brooklyn and Washington teams from 1884 to 1887, who also won three minor league batting titles in the 1880s.

=== April ===
- April 5 – Jack McGeachey, 65, backup outfielder who hit .245 with 164 stolen bases in 608 games for six teams from 1886 to 1891.
- April 11 – Wayland Dean, 27, pitcher who posted a 24–36 record with a 4.87 ERA for the Giants, Phillies and Cubs from 1924 to 1927.
- April 14:
  - Frank Kitson, 60, pitcher who won 128 games with a 3.18 ERA for six teams from 1898 to 1907.
  - John B. Sheridan, 61, sportswriter for St. Louis newspapers whose column "Back of the Home Plate" appeared in The Sporting News for many years.
- April 18 – Jack Stivetts, 62, pitcher for St. Louis Cardinals, Boston Beaneaters and Cleveland Spiders from 1889 to 1899, who collected six 20-win seasons, including 30-win campaigns in 1891 and 1892, and also hurled a no-hitter and won two games in the 1892 championship playoff.
- April 23:
  - Rube Manning, 46, pitcher who posted a 22–32 record with a 3.14 ERA in 84 games for the New York Yankees from 1907 through 1910.
  - Larry Twitchell, 66, outfielder and one of the early sluggers in major league history, who played from 1886 through 1894 with seven different teams, most prominently for the Detroit Wolverines.
- April 26 – Harry Mace, 63, pitcher for the 1891 Washington Statesmen.

=== May ===
- May 28 – Hal Carlson, 38, National League pitcher, winner of 114 games with the Pirates, Phillies and Cubs from 1917 through 1930, who was stricken with a fatal stomach hemorrhage in his hotel room, five days after his last MLB appearance.

=== June ===
- June 3 – George Hemming, 61, pitcher who posted a 91–82 record for six different clubs from 1891 through 1897.
- June 5 – Lou Say, shortstop who hit .232 in 298 games for eight teams in four different leagues from 1873 to 1884.
- June 9:
  - Lew McCarty, 41, catcher who hit .266 for the Brooklyn, New York and St. Louis National League teams from 1913 to 1921.
  - Harry Patton, 45, relief pitcher who appeared in one game for the 1910 St. Louis Cardinals.
- June 10 – Wally Smith, 42, valuable man at all four infield positions, who hit .229 in 201 games for the Cardinals and Senators between 1911 and 1914.
- June 22 – Bill Dam, 45, utility outfielder for the 1909 Boston Doves.

=== July ===
- July 5 – Frederick Fass, 70, pitcher for the 1887 Indianapolis Hoosiers.
- July 16 – Zeke Rosebraugh, 53, pitcher for the Pittsburgh Pirates in 1888 and 1889.
- July 19 – Will Holland, 68, outfielder for the Baltimore Orioles of the American Association in 1889.
- July 26 – Tommy Madden, 46, outfielder for the Boston Beaneaters and New York Highlanders in the early 20th century.

=== August ===
- August 4 – Sam Jackson, 81, second baseman for the Boston Red Stockings (1871) and the Brooklyn Atlantics (1872), who also became the third English player to reach the majors.
- August 7 – Emmett Seery, 69, outfielder who played for seven different teams in all four active leagues during the 19th century.
- August 15 – Guy Tutwiler, 41, first baseman for the Detroit Tigers between 1911 and 1913.
- August 17 – Harry Maskrey, 68, outfielder who appeared in one game for the Louisville Eclipse of the American Association in 1882.
- August 29 – Ben Sanders, 65, pitcher for five seasons, 1888–1892, threw no-hitter on August 22, 1892.

=== September ===
- September 1 – John Reccius, 70, pitcher and center fielder for the 1882–1883 Louisville Eclipse.
- September 7 – Mickey Keliher, 40, first baseman for the Pittsburgh Pirates from 1911 to 1912.
- September 14 – Jim McCauley, 67, backup catcher for the St. Louis Browns, Buffalo Bisons, Chicago White Stockings and Brooklyn Grays from 1884 to 1886.
- September 19 – Arlie Pond, 57, pitcher for the Baltimore Orioles from 1895 to 1898, as well as a doctor in the U.S. Army between 1898 and 1919.
- September 25 – Joe Wilhoit, 44, right fielder for the Boston Braves, Pittsburgh Pirates, New York Giants and Boston Red Sox from 1916 to 1919, who posted the longest hitting streak in baseball history with 69 games in 1919, while playing for the Wichita Jobbers of the Western League.

=== October ===
- October 9 – Lem Cross, 58, pitcher who posted a 3–6 record with the Cincinnati Reds from 1893 to 1894.
- October 29 – Gene Wright, 51, pitcher for the Brooklyn, Cleveland and St. Louis teams from 1901 to 1904.

=== November ===
- November 7:
  - Warren Fitzgerald, 62, pitcher who posted a 15–20 record with a 3.66 ERA for the Louisville Colonels from 1891 to 1892.
  - John Hanna, 67, catcher for the Washington Nationals and Richmond Virginians during the 1884 season.
- November 19 – John Russell, pitcher for the Brooklyn Robins and Chicago White Sox between 1917 and 1922.
- November 20 – William B. Hanna, 68, sportswriter for various New York newspapers since 1888, known for his florid writing style.
- November 28 – Ed Hendricks, 45, pitcher for the 1910 New York Giants.

=== December ===
- December 3 – Harry Baumgartner, 38, relief pitcher who went 0–1 in nine games for the 1920 Detroit Tigers.
- December 4 – William Baker, 64, owner of the Philadelphia Phillies from 1913 until his death.
- December 5 – Ben Guiney, 72, backup catcher for the Detroit Wolverines during the 1883 and 1884 seasons.
- December 9:
  - Rube Foster, 51, pioneer and driving force in the Negro leagues, as owner and manager of the Chicago American Giants from 1911 to 1925, who in 1920 founded the first stable Negro league, the Negro National League, and won its first three pennants, also regarded as the premier pitcher in black baseball in the century's first decade.
  - Dave Rowe, 76, center fielder for five teams in six seasons between 1877 and 1888, who also managed the Kansas City Cowboys in 1885 and 1888.
- December 14 – Al Hubbard, 70, catcher/shortstop for the 1883 Philadelphia Athletics.
- December 25 – Fred Clement, 63, shortstop for the 1890 Pittsburgh Alleghenys.
- December 29:
  - Sandy Piez, 42, backup outfielder who spent most of his career as a specialist pinch-runner with the 1914 New York Giants.
  - Ginger Shinault, 38, backup catcher who hit .295 in 35 games for the Cleveland Indians from 1921 to 1922.
  - George Stutz, 37, shortstop who appeared in six games with the 1926 Philadelphia Phillies.
