= 1930 Major League Baseball season =

1930 MLB season
- League: American League (AL); National League (NL)
- Sport: Baseball
- Duration: Regular season: April 14 – September 28, 1930 (AL); April 15 – September 28, 1930 (NL); World Series: October 1–8, 1930
- Games: 154
- Teams: 16 (8 per league)

Pennant Winners
- AL champions: Philadelphia Athletics
- AL runners-up: Washington Senators
- NL champions: St. Louis Cardinals
- NL runners-up: Chicago Cubs

World Series
- Champions: Philadelphia Athletics
- Runners-up: St. Louis Cardinals

MLB seasons
- ← 1929 1931 →

Locations of teams for the 1923–1931 American League seasons
American League
Locations of teams for the 1920–1931 National League seasons
National League

The 1930 major league baseball season began on April 14, 1930. The regular season ended on September 28, with the St. Louis Cardinals and Philadelphia Athletics as the regular season champions of the National League and American League, respectively. The postseason began with Game 1 of the 27th World Series on October 1 and ended with Game 6 on October 8. The Athletics defeated the Cardinals, four games to two, capturing their fifth championship in franchise history, winning back-to-back World Series.

Offense dominated this season. The National League batted .303, with six teams batting better than .300. The American League came in at .288, with three teams batting over .300.

== Schedule ==
The 1930 schedule consisted of 154 games for all teams in the American League and National League, each of which had eight teams. Each team was scheduled to play 22 games against the other seven teams of their respective league. This continued the format put in place since the 1904 season (except for 1919) and would be used until 1961 in the American League and 1962 in the National League.

American League Opening Day took place on April 14 with the Boston Red Sox and Washington Senators playing, while National League Opening Day took place the following day. The final day of the regular season was on September 28, which saw all sixteen teams play on the final day for the first time. The World Series took place between October 1 and October 8.

== Rule changes ==
The 1930 season saw the following rule changes:

- Any player who was transferred to another team must report with their new team within 72 hours, with exceptions to those who had to travel from one coast to another.
- League presidents must now appoint the official scorers for each team based on the recommendations of the team presidents and local BBWAA chapters.

== Teams ==
An asterisk (*) denotes the ballpark a team played the minority of their home games at

League	Team	City	Ballpark	Capacity	Manager
American League	Boston Red Sox	Boston, Massachusetts	Fenway Park	27,000	Heinie Wagner
American League	Boston Red Sox	Boston, Massachusetts	Braves Field*	46,500*	Heinie Wagner
American League	Chicago White Sox	Chicago, Illinois	Comiskey Park	52,000	Donie Bush
American League	Cleveland Indians	Cleveland, Ohio	League Park	21,414	Roger Peckinpaugh
American League	Detroit Tigers	Detroit, Michigan	Navin Field	30,000	Bucky Harris
American League	New York Yankees	New York, New York	Yankee Stadium	62,000	Bob Shawkey
American League	Philadelphia Athletics	Philadelphia, Pennsylvania	Shibe Park	33,000	Connie Mack
American League	St. Louis Browns	St. Louis, Missouri	Sportsman's Park	34,023	Bill Killefer
American League	Washington Senators	Washington, D.C.	Griffith Stadium	27,000	Walter Johnson
National League	Boston Braves	Boston, Massachusetts	Braves Field	46,500	Bill McKechnie
National League	Brooklyn Robins	New York, New York	Ebbets Field	28,000	Wilbert Robinson
National League	Chicago Cubs	Chicago, Illinois	Wrigley Field	40,000	Joe McCarthy
National League	Chicago Cubs	Chicago, Illinois	Wrigley Field	40,000	Rogers Hornsby
National League	Cincinnati Reds	Cincinnati, Ohio	Redland Field	26,060	Dan Howley
National League	New York Giants	New York, New York	Polo Grounds	56,000	John McGraw
National League	Philadelphia Phillies	Philadelphia, Pennsylvania	Baker Bowl	18,800	Burt Shotton
National League	Pittsburgh Pirates	Pittsburgh, Pennsylvania	Forbes Field	41,000	Jewel Ens
National League	St. Louis Cardinals	St. Louis, Missouri	Sportsman's Park	34,023	Gabby Street

== Standings ==
=== American League ===
American League
Team	W	L	Pct.	GB	Home	Road
Philadelphia Athletics	102	52	.662	—	58‍–‍18	44‍–‍34
Washington Senators	94	60	.610	8	56‍–‍21	38‍–‍39
New York Yankees	86	68	.558	16	47‍–‍29	39‍–‍39
Cleveland Indians	81	73	.526	21	44‍–‍33	37‍–‍40
Detroit Tigers	75	79	.487	27	45‍–‍33	30‍–‍46
St. Louis Browns	64	90	.416	38	38‍–‍40	26‍–‍50
Chicago White Sox	62	92	.403	40	34‍–‍44	28‍–‍48
Boston Red Sox	52	102	.338	50	30‍–‍46	22‍–‍56

=== National League ===
National League
Team	W	L	Pct.	GB	Home	Road
St. Louis Cardinals	92	62	.597	—	53‍–‍24	39‍–‍38
Chicago Cubs	90	64	.584	2	51‍–‍26	39‍–‍38
New York Giants	87	67	.565	5	46‍–‍31	41‍–‍36
Brooklyn Robins	86	68	.558	6	49‍–‍28	37‍–‍40
Pittsburgh Pirates	80	74	.519	12	42‍–‍35	38‍–‍39
Boston Braves	70	84	.455	22	39‍–‍38	31‍–‍46
Cincinnati Reds	59	95	.383	33	37‍–‍40	22‍–‍55
Philadelphia Phillies	52	102	.338	40	35‍–‍42	17‍–‍60

=== Tie games ===
2 tie games (0 in AL, 2 in NL), which are not factored into winning percentage or games behind (and were often replayed again) occurred throughout the season.

==== National League ====
The Chicago Cubs and Philadelphia Phillies had two tie games each.

- August 16 (game 2), Philadelphia Phillies vs. Chicago Cubs, tied at 3 after 11 innings on account of darkness.
- August 19 (game 2), Philadelphia Phillies vs. Chicago Cubs, tied at 6 after 16 innings on account of darkness.

== Postseason ==
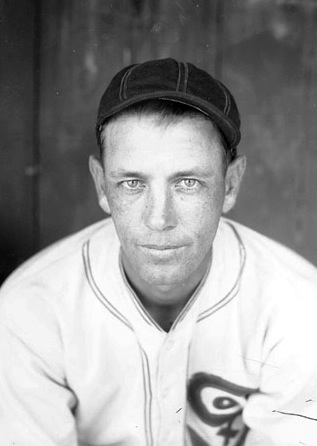
Ted Lyons

The postseason began on October 1 and ended on October 8 with the Philadelphia Athletics defeating the St. Louis Cardinals in the 1930 World Series in six games.

=== Bracket ===
World Series
AL	Philadelphia Athletics	4
NL	St. Louis Cardinals	2

== Managerial changes ==
=== Off-season ===
Team	Former Manager	New Manager
Boston Braves	Emil Fuchs	Bill McKechnie
Boston Red Sox	Bill Carrigan	Heinie Wagner
Chicago White Sox	Lena Blackburne	Donie Bush
Cincinnati Reds	Jack Hendricks	Dan Howley
New York Yankees	Art Fletcher	Bob Shawkey
St. Louis Browns	Dan Howley	Bill Killefer
St. Louis Cardinals	Bill McKechnie	Gabby Street

=== In-season ===
Team	Former Manager	New Manager
Chicago Cubs	Joe McCarthy	Rogers Hornsby

== League leaders ==
=== American League ===
Hitting leaders
Stat	Player	Total
AVG	Al Simmons (PHA)	.381
OPS	Babe Ruth (NYY)	1.225
HR	Babe Ruth (NYY)	49
RBI	Lou Gehrig (NYY)	173
R	Al Simmons (PHA)	152
H	Johnny Hodapp (CLE)	225
SB	Marty McManus (DET)	23

Pitching leaders
Stat	Player	Total
W	Lefty Grove^{1} (PHA)	28
L	Milt Gaston (BOS); Jack Russell (BOS)	20
ERA	Lefty Grove^{1} (PHA)	2.54
K	Lefty Grove^{1} (PHA)	209
IP	Ted Lyons (CWS)	297.2
SV	Lefty Grove (PHA)	9
WHIP	Lefty Grove (PHA)	1.144

^{1} American League Triple Crown pitching winner

=== National League ===
Hitting leaders
Stat	Player	Total
AVG	Bill Terry (NYG)	.401
OPS	Hack Wilson (CHC)	1.177
HR	Hack Wilson (CHC)	56
RBI	Hack Wilson^{2} (CHC)	191
R	Chuck Klein (PHI)	158
H	Bill Terry (NYG)	254
SB	Kiki Cuyler (CHC)	37

^{2} All-time single-season runs batted in record

Pitching leaders
Stat	Player	Total
W	Ray Kremer (PIT); Pat Malone (CHC)	20
L	Larry French (PIT); Benny Frey (CIN)	18
ERA	Dazzy Vance (BRO)	2.61
K	Bill Hallahan (STL)	177
IP	Ray Kremer (PIT)	276.0
SV	Herman Bell (STL)	8
WHIP	Dazzy Vance (BRO)	1.144

== Milestones ==
=== Batters ===
==== Cycles ====
- Freddie Lindstrom (NYG):
  - Lindstrom hit for his first cycle and 10th in franchise history, on May 8 against the Pittsburgh Pirates.
- Hack Wilson (CHC):
  - Wilson hit for his first cycle and third in franchise history, on June 23 against the Philadelphia Phillies.
- Chick Hafey (STL):
  - Hafey hit for his first cycle and sixth in franchise history, on August 21 against the Philadelphia Phillies.

== Awards and honors ==
The Sporting News Awards
Award	National League	American League
Most Valuable Player	Bill Terry (NYG)	Joe Cronin (WSH)

== Home field attendance ==
Team name	Wins	%±	Home attendance	%±	Per game
Chicago Cubs	90	−8.2%	1,463,624	−1.5%	18,527
New York Yankees	86	−2.3%	1,169,230	21.8%	15,385
Brooklyn Robins	86	22.9%	1,097,329	49.9%	14,251
New York Giants	87	3.6%	868,714	0.0%	11,282
Philadelphia Athletics	102	−1.9%	721,663	−14.0%	9,496
Detroit Tigers	75	7.1%	649,450	−25.3%	8,326
Washington Senators	94	32.4%	614,474	72.8%	7,980
Cleveland Indians	81	0.0%	528,657	−1.4%	6,866
St. Louis Cardinals	92	17.9%	508,501	27.2%	6,604
Boston Braves	70	25.0%	464,835	24.8%	6,037
Boston Red Sox	52	−10.3%	444,045	12.5%	5,843
Chicago White Sox	62	5.1%	406,123	−4.8%	5,207
Cincinnati Reds	59	−10.6%	386,727	31.1%	5,022
Pittsburgh Pirates	80	−9.1%	357,795	−27.2%	4,647
Philadelphia Phillies	52	−26.8%	299,007	6.3%	3,883
St. Louis Browns	64	−19.0%	152,088	−45.8%	1,950

== Venues ==
Across 76 homes games, the Boston Red Sox played their Saturday, April 19 doubleheader against the New York Yankees, Friday, July 4 doubleheader against the Philadelphia Athletics, as well as all 16 of their Sunday games at the Boston Braves home field of Braves Field (the remaining 56 home games were played at Fenway Park). This was the 2nd of three consecutive seasons playing all Sunday games at Braves Field and 2nd of four consecutive season playing some games at Braves Field.

== See also ==
- 1930 in baseball (Events, Births, Deaths)
