= 1928 Chicago White Sox season =

1928 Chicago White Sox
- League: American League
- Ballpark: Comiskey Park
- City: Chicago, Illinois
- Record: 72–82 (.468)
- League place: 5th
- Owners: Charles Comiskey
- Managers: Ray Schalk, Lena Blackburne
- Radio: WCFL (Johnny O'Hara); WGN (Quin Ryan); WMAQ (Hal Totten)

The 1928 Chicago White Sox season was a season in Major League Baseball. The team finished fifth in the American League with a record of 72–82, 29 games behind the pennant-winning New York Yankees.

== Offseason ==
=== Notable transactions ===
- November 5, 1927: The White Sox traded Ike Boone, Bert Cole, a player to be named later and $75,000 to the Portland Beavers for Bill Cissell. The White Sox completed the trade on February 6, 1928, by sending Ike Davis to the Beavers.

== Regular season ==
=== Season standings ===
American League
Team	W	L	Pct.	GB	Home	Road
New York Yankees	101	53	.656	—	52‍–‍25	49‍–‍28
Philadelphia Athletics	98	55	.641	2½	52‍–‍25	46‍–‍30
St. Louis Browns	82	72	.532	19	43‍–‍34	39‍–‍38
Washington Senators	75	79	.487	26	37‍–‍43	38‍–‍36
Chicago White Sox	72	82	.468	29	37‍–‍40	35‍–‍42
Detroit Tigers	68	86	.442	33	36‍–‍41	32‍–‍45
Cleveland Indians	62	92	.403	39	28‍–‍49	34‍–‍43
Boston Red Sox	57	96	.373	43½	26‍–‍47	31‍–‍49

=== Record vs. opponents ===
1928 American League record Sources:
Team	BOS	CWS	CLE	DET	NYY	PHA	SLB	WSH
Boston	—	10–12	9–13	7–15	6–16	3–18	9–13	13–9–1
Chicago	12–10	—	12–10–1	13–9	9–13	6–16	10–12	10–12
Cleveland	13–9	10–12–1	—	10–12	6–16	6–16	7–15	10–12
Detroit	15–7	9–13	12–10	—	7–15	8–14	9–13	8–14
New York	16–6	13–9	16–6	15–7	—	16–6	12–10	13–9
Philadelphia	18–3	16–6	16–6	14–8	6–16	—	16–6	12–10
St. Louis	13–9	12–10	15–7	13–9	10–12	6–16	—	13–9
Washington	9–13–1	12–10	12–10	14–8	9–13	10–12	9–13	—

=== Roster ===
1928 Chicago White Sox roster
Roster
Pitchers: Grady Adkins; Charlie Barnabe; Ted Blankenship; Sarge Connally; George Cox; Dan Dugan; Red Faber; John Goodell; Rudy Leopold; Ted Lyons; Tommy Thomas; Ed Walsh, Jr.; Bob Weiland; Al Williamson; Roy Wilson	Catchers: Moe Berg; Buck Crouse; Harry McCurdy; Ray Schalk; Infielders: Bill Cissell; Bud Clancy; Bill Hunnefield; Willie Kamm; Johnny Mann; Buck Redfern; Art Shires; Karl Swanson	Outfielders: Bill Barrett; George Blackerby; Bibb Falk; Alex Metzler; Randy Moore; Johnny Mostil; Carl Reynolds	Manager: Lena Blackburne; Ray Schalk; Coaches: Lena Blackburne; Ed Walsh

== Player stats ==
=== Batting ===
==== Starters by position ====
Note: Pos = Position; G = Games played; AB = At bats; H = Hits; Avg. = Batting average; HR = Home runs; RBI = Runs batted in

Pos	Player	G	AB	H	Avg.	HR	RBI
C	Moe Berg	76	224	55	.246	0	29
1B	Bud Clancy	130	487	132	.271	2	37
2B	Bill Hunnefield	94	333	98	.294	2	24
SS	Bill Cissell	125	443	115	.260	1	60
3B	Willie Kamm	155	552	170	.308	1	84
OF	Johnny Mostil	133	503	136	.270	0	51
OF	Alex Metzler	139	464	141	.304	3	55
OF	Carl Reynolds	84	291	94	.323	2	36

==== Other batters ====
Note: G = Games played; AB = At bats; H = Hits; Avg. = Batting average; HR = Home runs; RBI = Runs batted in

Player	G	AB	H	Avg.	HR	RBI
Bibb Falk	98	286	83	.290	1	37
Buck Redfern	86	261	61	.234	0	35
Bill Barrett	76	235	65	.277	3	26
Buck Crouse	78	218	55	.252	2	20
Art Shires	33	123	42	.341	1	11
Harry McCurdy	49	103	27	.262	2	13
George Blackerby	30	83	21	.253	0	12
Karl Swanson	22	64	9	.141	0	6
Randy Moore	24	61	13	.213	0	5
Johnny Mann	6	6	2	.333	0	1
Ray Schalk	2	1	1	1.000	0	1

=== Pitching ===
==== Starting pitchers ====
Note: G = Games pitched; IP = Innings pitched; W = Wins; L = Losses; ERA = Earned run average; SO = Strikeouts

Player	G	IP	W	L	ERA	SO
Tommy Thomas	36	283.0	17	16	3.08	129
Ted Lyons	39	240.0	15	14	3.98	60
Grady Adkins	36	224.2	10	16	3.73	54
Red Faber	27	201.1	13	9	3.75	43
Ted Blankenship	27	158.0	9	11	4.61	36
Ed Walsh Jr.	14	78.0	4	7	4.96	32
Bob Weiland	1	9.0	1	0	0.00	9

==== Other pitchers ====
Note: G = Games pitched; IP = Innings pitched; W = Wins; L = Losses; ERA = Earned run average; SO = Strikeouts

Player	G	IP	W	L	ERA	SO
Sarge Connally	28	74.1	2	5	4.84	28
Charlie Barnabe	7	9.2	0	2	6.52	3

==== Relief pitchers ====
Note: G = Games pitched; W = Wins; L = Losses; SV = Saves; ERA = Earned run average; SO = Strikeouts

Player	G	W	L	SV	ERA	SO
George Cox	26	1	2	0	5.26	22
John Goodell	2	0	0	0	18.00	0
Rudy Leopold	2	0	0	0	3.86	0
Roy Wilson	1	0	0	0	0.00	2
Al Williamson	1	0	0	0	0.00	0
Dan Dugan	1	0	0	0	0.00	0
