= 1929 Chicago White Sox season =

1929 Chicago White Sox
- League: American League
- Ballpark: Comiskey Park
- City: Chicago, Illinois
- Record: 59–93 (.388)
- League place: 7th
- Owners: Charles Comiskey
- Managers: Lena Blackburne
- Radio: WCFL (Johnny O'Hara); WGN (Quin Ryan); WMAQ (Hal Totten)

The 1929 Chicago White Sox season was the White Sox's 29th season in the major leagues, and its 30th season overall.

== League performance ==
The team finished with a record of 59–93, good enough for seventh place in the American League, 46 games behind the first place Philadelphia Athletics.

== Regular season ==
=== Season standings ===
American League
Team	W	L	Pct.	GB	Home	Road
Philadelphia Athletics	104	46	.693	—	57‍–‍16	47‍–‍30
New York Yankees	88	66	.571	18	49‍–‍28	39‍–‍38
Cleveland Indians	81	71	.533	24	44‍–‍32	37‍–‍39
St. Louis Browns	79	73	.520	26	41‍–‍36	38‍–‍37
Washington Senators	71	81	.467	34	37‍–‍40	34‍–‍41
Detroit Tigers	70	84	.455	36	38‍–‍39	32‍–‍45
Chicago White Sox	59	93	.388	46	35‍–‍41	24‍–‍52
Boston Red Sox	58	96	.377	48	32‍–‍45	26‍–‍51

=== Record vs. opponents ===
1929 American League record Sources:
Team	BOS	CWS	CLE	DET	NYY	PHA	SLB	WSH
Boston	—	11–11	9–13	8–14	5–17	4–18	11–11–1	10–12
Chicago	11–11	—	9–12	10–12	6–16	9–13	4–17	10–12
Cleveland	13–9	12–9	—	11–11	14–8	7–14	10–12	14–8
Detroit	14–8	12–10	11–11	—	9–13	4–18	10–12	10–12–1
New York	17–5	16–6	8–14	13–9	—	8–14	14–8	12–10
Philadelphia	18–4	13–9	14–7	18–4	14–8	—	11–10–1	16–4
St. Louis	11–11–1	17–4	12–10	12–10	8–14	10–11–1	—	9–13
Washington	12–10	12–10	8–14	12–10–1	10–12	4–16	13–9	—

=== Roster ===
1929 Chicago White Sox
Roster
Pitchers: Grady Adkins; Lena Blackburne; Ted Blankenship; Jerry Byrne; Sarge Connally; Dan Dugan; Red Faber; Dutch Henry; Ted Lyons; Hal McKain; Tommy Thomas; Ed Walsh, Jr.; Bob Weiland	Catchers: Chick Autry; Moe Berg; Buck Crouse; Infielders: Bill Cissell; Bud Clancy; Bill Hunnefield; Willie Kamm; John Kerr; Buck Redfern; Art Shires; Frank Sigafoos	Outfielders: Dutch Hoffman; Alex Metzler; Johnny Mostil; Carl Reynolds; Doug Taitt; Johnny Watwood; Other batters: Bill Barrett; Karl Swanson	Manager: Lena Blackburne; Coaches: Ed Walsh

== Player stats ==
=== Batting ===
==== Starters by position ====
Note: Pos = Position; G = Games played; AB = At bats; H = Hits; Avg. = Batting average; HR = Home runs; RBI = Runs batted in

Pos	Player	G	AB	H	Avg.	HR	RBI
C	Moe Berg	107	352	101	.287	0	47
1B	Art Shires	100	353	110	.312	3	41
2B	John Kerr	127	419	108	.258	1	39
SS	Bill Cissell	152	618	173	.280	5	62
3B	Willie Kamm	147	523	140	.268	3	63
OF	Dutch Hoffman	107	337	87	.258	3	37
OF	Alex Metzler	146	568	156	.275	2	49
OF	Carl Reynolds	131	517	164	.317	11	67

==== Other batters ====
Note: G = Games played; AB = At bats; H = Hits; Avg. = Batting average; HR = Home runs; RBI = Runs batted in

Player	G	AB	H	Avg.	HR	RBI
Bud Clancy	92	290	82	.283	3	45
Johnny Watwood	85	278	84	.302	2	28
Bill Hunnefield	47	127	23	.181	0	9
Doug Taitt	47	124	21	.169	0	12
Buck Crouse	45	107	29	.271	2	12
Chick Autry	43	96	20	.208	1	12
Buck Redfern	21	46	6	.130	0	3
Johnny Mostil	12	35	8	.229	0	3
Frank Sigafoos	7	3	1	.333	0	1
Bill Barrett	3	1	0	.000	0	0
Karl Swanson	2	1	0	.000	0	0

=== Pitching ===
==== Starting pitchers ====
Note: G = Games pitched; IP = Innings pitched; W = Wins; L = Losses; ERA = Earned run average; SO = Strikeouts

Player	G	IP	W	L	ERA	SO
Tommy Thomas	36	259.2	14	18	3.19	62
Ted Lyons	37	259.1	14	20	4.10	57
Red Faber	31	234.0	13	13	3.88	68
Ed Walsh Jr.	24	129.0	6	11	5.65	31

==== Other pitchers ====
Note: G = Games pitched; IP = Innings pitched; W = Wins; L = Losses; ERA = Earned run average; SO = Strikeouts

Player	G	IP	W	L	ERA	SO
Hal McKain	34	158.0	6	9	3.65	33
Grady Adkins	31	138.1	2	11	5.33	24
Bob Weiland	15	62.0	2	4	5.81	25
Ted Blankenship	8	18.1	0	2	8.84	7
Dutch Henry	2	15.0	1	0	6.00	2
Jerry Byrne	3	7.1	0	1	7.36	1

==== Relief pitchers ====
Note: G = Games pitched; W = Wins; L = Losses; SV = Saves; ERA = Earned run average; SO = Strikeouts

Player	G	W	L	SV	ERA	SO
Dan Dugan	19	1	4	1	6.65	15
Sarge Connally	11	0	0	1	4.76	3
Lena Blackburne	1	0	0	0	0.00	0
