= 1929 Philadelphia Athletics season =

1929 Philadelphia Athletics
- World Series champions American League champions
- League: American League
- Ballpark: Shibe Park
- City: Philadelphia
- Record: 104–46 (.693)
- League place: 1st
- Owners: Connie Mack, Tom Shibe and John Shibe
- Managers: Connie Mack

The 1929 Philadelphia Athletics season involved the A's finishing first in the American League with a record of 104 wins and 46 losses. After finishing in second place to the New York Yankees in 1927 and 1928, the club won the 1929 pennant by a large 18-game margin. The club won the World Series over the National League champion Chicago Cubs, four games to one.

== Offseason ==
- January 5, 1929: Homer Summa was purchased by the Athletics from the Cleveland Indians.

== Regular season ==
Led by longtime owner-manager Connie Mack, the Athletics dominated during the regular season. Mack had purchased quite a few players from the Baltimore Orioles minor league club, and many of them would contribute to the A's 1929–31 dynasty.

The most famous of these players was ace Lefty Grove. In 1929, Grove led the American League in ERA and strikeouts on his way to a 20–6 record. Big George Earnshaw was the number two pitcher on the squad. He led the league in wins (24) and was second in strikeouts. Led by these two, Philadelphia allowed the fewest runs of any AL team.

On the offensive side, the A's boasted future Hall of Famers Mickey Cochrane, Jimmie Foxx, and Al Simmons. Simmons beat out Babe Ruth for the RBI crown in 1929.

=== Season standings ===
American League
Team	W	L	Pct.	GB	Home	Road
Philadelphia Athletics	104	46	.693	—	57‍–‍16	47‍–‍30
New York Yankees	88	66	.571	18	49‍–‍28	39‍–‍38
Cleveland Indians	81	71	.533	24	44‍–‍32	37‍–‍39
St. Louis Browns	79	73	.520	26	41‍–‍36	38‍–‍37
Washington Senators	71	81	.467	34	37‍–‍40	34‍–‍41
Detroit Tigers	70	84	.455	36	38‍–‍39	32‍–‍45
Chicago White Sox	59	93	.388	46	35‍–‍41	24‍–‍52
Boston Red Sox	58	96	.377	48	32‍–‍45	26‍–‍51

=== Record vs. opponents ===
1929 American League record Sources:
Team	BOS	CWS	CLE	DET	NYY	PHA	SLB	WSH
Boston	—	11–11	9–13	8–14	5–17	4–18	11–11–1	10–12
Chicago	11–11	—	9–12	10–12	6–16	9–13	4–17	10–12
Cleveland	13–9	12–9	—	11–11	14–8	7–14	10–12	14–8
Detroit	14–8	12–10	11–11	—	9–13	4–18	10–12	10–12–1
New York	17–5	16–6	8–14	13–9	—	8–14	14–8	12–10
Philadelphia	18–4	13–9	14–7	18–4	14–8	—	11–10–1	16–4
St. Louis	11–11–1	17–4	12–10	12–10	8–14	10–11–1	—	9–13
Washington	12–10	12–10	8–14	12–10–1	10–12	4–16	13–9	—

=== Roster ===
1929 Philadelphia Athletics
Roster
Pitchers: Bill Breckinridge; George Earnshaw; Howard Ehmke; Lefty Grove; Ossie Orwoll; Jack Quinn; Eddie Rommel; Bill Shores; Rube Walberg; Carroll Yerkes	Catchers: Mickey Cochrane; Cloy Mattox; Cy Perkins; Infielders: Max Bishop; Jim Cronin; Joe Boley; George Burns; Jimmy Dykes; Jimmie Foxx; Sammy Hale; Joe Hassler; Eric McNair; Rudy Miller; Bud Morse	Outfielders: Doc Cramer; Walter French; Mule Haas; Bevo LeBourveau; Bing Miller; Al Simmons; Homer Summa; Other batters: Eddie Collins	Manager: Connie Mack

== Player stats ==
= Indicates team leader

= Indicates league leader

=== Batting ===
==== Starters by position ====
Note: Pos = Position; G = Games played; AB = At bats; H = Hits; Avg. = Batting average; HR = Home runs; RBI = Runs batted in

Pos	Player	G	AB	H	Avg.	HR	RBI
C	Mickey Cochrane	135	514	170	.331	7	95
1B	Jimmie Foxx	149	517	183	.354	33	118
2B	Max Bishop	129	475	110	.232	3	36
3B	Sammy Hale	101	379	105	.277	1	40
SS	Joe Boley	91	303	76	.251	2	47
LF	Al Simmons	143	581	212	.365	34	157
CF	Mule Haas	139	578	181	.313	16	82
RF	Bing Miller	147	556	184	.331	8	93

==== Other batters ====
Note: Pos = Position; G = Games played; AB = At bats; H = Hits; Avg. = Batting average; HR = Home runs; RBI = Runs batted in

Pos	Player	G	AB	H	Avg.	HR	RBI
INF	Jimmy Dykes	119	401	131	.327	13	79
OF	Homer Summa	37	81	22	.272	0	10
C	Cy Perkins	38	76	16	.211	0	9
INF	Joe Cronin	25	56	13	.232	0	4
OF	Ossie Orwoll	30	51	13	.255	0	6
IB	George Burns	29	49	13	.265	1	11
OF	Walter French	45	45	12	.267	1	9
2B	Bud Morse	8	27	2	.074	0	0
OF	Bevo LeBourveau	12	16	5	.313	0	2
SS	Eric McNair	4	8	4	.500	0	3
PH	Eddie Collins	9	7	0	.000	0	0
C	Cloy Mattox	3	6	1	.167	0	0
OF	Doc Cramer	2	6	0	.000	0	0
3B	Rudy Miller	2	4	1	.250	0	1
SS	Joe Hassler	4	4	0	.000	0	0

=== Pitching ===
==== Starting pitchers ====
Note: G = Games pitched; GS = Games started; IP = Innings pitched; W = Wins; L = Losses; ERA = Earned run average; SO = Strikeouts

Player	G	GS	IP	W	L	ERA	SO
Lefty Grove	42	37	275.1	20	6	2.81	170
Rube Walberg	40	33	267.2	18	11	3.60	94
George Earnshaw	44	33	254.2	24	8	3.29	149
Jack Quinn	35	18	161.0	11	9	3.97	41

==== Other pitchers ====
Note: G = Games pitched; IP = Innings pitched; W = Wins; L = Losses; ERA = Earned run average; SO = Strikeouts

Player	G	IP	W	L	ERA	SO
Bill Shores	39	152.2	11	6	3.60	49
Eddie Rommel	32	113.2	12	2	2.85	25
Howard Ehmke	11	54.2	7	2	3.29	20
Bill Breckinridge	3	10.0	0	0	8.10	2

Note: Bill Shores was team leader in saves with 7.

==== Relief pitchers ====
Note: G = Games pitched; W = Wins; L = Losses; SV = Saves; ERA = Earned run average; SO = Strikeouts

Player	G	W	L	SV	ERA	SO
Carroll Yerkes	19	1	0	1	4.58	11
Ossie Orwoll	12	0	2	1	4.80	12

== 1929 World Series ==
AL Philadelphia Athletics (4) vs. NL Chicago Cubs (1)

Game	Score	Date	Location	Attendance
1	Athletics – 3, Cubs – 1	October 8	Wrigley Field	50,740
2	Athletics – 9, Cubs – 3	October 9	Wrigley Field	49,987
3	Cubs – 3, Athletics – 1	October 11	Shibe Park	29,921
4	Cubs – 8, Athletics – 10	October 12	Shibe Park	29,921
5	Cubs – 2, Athletics – 3	October 14	Shibe Park	29,921

== Farm system ==
Level	Team	League	Manager
AA	Baltimore Orioles	International League	Fritz Maisel
D	Martinsburg Blue Sox	Blue Ridge League	Dan O'Leary

== Awards and honors ==
=== League leaders ===
- Lefty Grove, American League leader, strikeouts

=== More recent honors ===
Al Simmons and the 1929–1931 Athletics were the subject of an August 19, 1996, cover story in Sports Illustrated with the teaser, "The Team that Time Forgot". Author William Nack wrote, "according to most old-timers who played in that era, the 1927 and '28 Yankees and the 1929 and '30 Athletics matched up so closely that they were nearly equal, with the A's given the nod in fielding and pitching and the Yankees in hitting."

On August 16, 2009, the Oakland Athletics celebrated the 80th anniversary of the 1929 team by wearing 1929 home uniforms against the Chicago White Sox. First pitches were thrown out by Kathleen Kelly, the granddaughter of Connie Mack, and Jim Conlin, the grandson of Jimmie Foxx. The A's won the game on a walk-off home run by Mark Ellis.
