= Art Shires =

American baseball player (1906–1967)

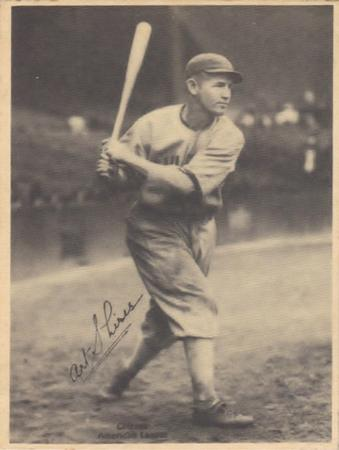
- First baseman
- Born: August 13, 1906; Italy, Texas, U.S.
- Died: July 13, 1967 (aged 60); Italy, Texas, U.S.
- Batted: Left Threw: Right

MLB debut
- August 20, 1928, for the Chicago White Sox

Last MLB appearance
- July 31, 1932, for the Boston Braves

MLB statistics
- Batting average: .291
- Home runs: 11
- Runs batted in: 119
- Stats at Baseball Reference

Teams
- Chicago White Sox (1928–1930); Washington Senators (1930); Boston Braves (1932)

Charles Arthur Shires (August 13, 1906 – July 13, 1967) was an American professional baseball player. He played in Major League Baseball as a first baseman for the Chicago White Sox, Washington Senators and Boston Braves. In a four-year major league career, Shires played in 290 games, accumulating 287 hits in 986 at bats for a .291 career batting average along with 11 home runs, 119 runs batted in, an on-base percentage of .347, and a .988 fielding percentage. Shires was a colorful personality with a penchant for self-praise, earning himself the nickname, Arthur The Great Shires.

== Early life ==
Art Shires was born on August 13, 1906, to Josh and Sallee Shires. He was one of nine children; his brother, Leonard, played professional baseball for nine seasons. He attended Waxahachie High School and played for the school's baseball team. While still in high school, he first tried out for the Washington Senators, who chose not to sign him, before beginning his professional career in Texas after graduation. Shires began his professional baseball career in 1926 at the age of 19 with the Waco Cubs of the Texas League. During this time, Shires assumed the fake identity of “Dana Prince” and enrolled at Marshall University where he joined the football team as a punter. His ruse was discovered shortly thereafter by Athletic Director Roy Hawley who immediately made him ineligible, ending his collegiate football career barely after it had begun. In his short career though, he kicked an 80 yard punt which set a school record until it was eventually beaten in 2017 by Kaare Vedvik. In 1928 he had a .387 batting average with 11 home runs in 108 games for Waco and, on July 31, his contract was purchased by the Chicago White Sox.

== MLB career ==
Shires made his major league debut with the White Sox on August 20, 1928 at the age of 21, delivering four hits in five at-bats off future Hall of Fame pitcher, Red Ruffing. He replaced Bud Clancy as the starting first baseman and ended the 1928 season with a .341 average in 33 games that year. On December 28, 1928, a 53-year-old man from Shreveport, Louisiana, died from head injuries after being hit by a baseball thrown by Shires on May 20, 1928, in a game between Waco and Shreveport. Shires had allegedly thrown the baseball in anger at a group of disapproving Shreveport fans. On March 27, 1929, Shires was sued by the dead man's wife for $25,411 (equivalent to $476,456 in 2025). One day after the lawsuit was reported in the papers, Shires was exonerated by a grand jury on March 29, 1929. The suit was dropped after an agreed judgment for $500 (equivalent to $9,600 in 2025) on January 11, 1930.

White Sox manager Lena Blackburne named Shires to be the team captain before the 1929 season, succeeding third baseman Willie Kamm who asked to step down from the role to concentrate on his hitting. Only two weeks later, Blackburne stripped him of his captain's role and sent him home from spring training, due to his being out of shape as well as keeping late hours and breaking training rules.

Shires made national news in May 1929 when he gave Blackburne a black eye during a fist fight and was suspended from the team. One week later, a contrite Shires apologized to Blackburne and was reinstated. Shires' troubles with Blackburne had him reduced to a part-time role with an occasional pinch hitting assignment. He eventually regained his role as a starting player when Clancy was injured in late June. On September 14, the two men fought again when Blackburne tried to reprimand Shires for breaking team rules, resulting in Shires' third suspension of the season. Although it was thought that Shires might lose his job over the altercation, it was Blackburne who would lose his job at the end of the season. Shires ended the 1929 season with a .312 batting average along with 3 home runs and 41 runs batted in.

In December 1929, Shires tried his hand at boxing, taking 21 seconds to knockout an unknown fighter named Dan Daly. Shires entered the arena wearing a robe with the words "Arthur The Great Shires" printed on back. It was reported on December 14 that Chicago Cubs player Hack Wilson signed a contract to meet Shires in the ring in January. On December 18, Shires' boxing career suffered a setback when he lost a bout to Chicago Bears football player George Trafton. Seeing no benefit in fighting a defeated boxer, Wilson backed out of his proposed bout with Shires. In late December, Shires was suspended by the Michigan State Boxing Commission and the National Boxing Association after his boxing manager was alleged to have offered money to a future Shires opponent to lose a fight on purpose. Soon after that revelation, Dan Daly admitted to the Illinois State Boxing Commission that he too had lost his fight to Shires on purpose. Shires was eventually cleared from any wrongdoing by the boxing commissions after no evidence was found that he had fixed the fights.

In January 1930, Shires defeated Boston Braves player Al Spohrer in four rounds by technical knockout at the Boston Garden. There was a move made to have Shires fight Boston Bruins hockey player, Eddie Shore, who was well known for his fighting skills, having set a single-season record for penalty minutes in 1928, however, in the wake of his previous bouts, Baseball Commissioner Kenesaw Mountain Landis ruled that any baseball player engaging in boxing matches could consider himself retired from baseball as "the activities do not mix," thus putting a stop to Shires' fighting career. However, rumors later surfaced that the ban was a preventive measure to avoid match fixing.

Although Shires was still suspended from the White Sox after his altercation with Blackburne, he had the audacity to demand a contract for $25,000 (equivalent to $482,000 in 2025). When White Sox owner Charles Comiskey failed to meet this demand, an angered Shires threatened to quit baseball. Eventually, he relented and signed a contract for $7,500 (equivalent to $144,500 in 2025) and rejoined the team. Having worn out his welcome with the White Sox, Shires was hitting for a .258 average in June 1930 when he was traded to the Washington Senators.

After the trade, Shires hit for a .369 average in 38 games for the Senators. The Senators already had two first basemen in Joe Judge and Joe Kuhel and, when reports surfaced that Shires was complaining about being a reserve player and that his work ethic was lacking, Senators owner Clark Griffith sold Shires to the minor league Milwaukee Brewers for a reported $10,000 in November 1930. With typical bombast, Shires claimed that he was too good a player to be sitting on a major league bench and predicted that he would hit, "around .350" for Milwaukee. In December 1930, Shires was arrested in Hollywood, California, on charges of drunkenness and carrying concealed weapons. The arrest was accompanied by Shires bragging that he had succumbed to movie offers.

Shires proceeded to back up his claims with the Brewers in 1931, posting a .384 average with 11 home runs in 157 games, winning the American Association batting championship. His performance earned him a return to the major leagues when the Brewers traded him to the Boston Braves for Al Bool and $10,000 on November 9, 1931.

Ironically, Shires' roommate with the Braves was his former boxing foe, Al Spohrer. On April 22, 1932, Shires suffered a torn ligament in a collision with baserunner Joe Stripp. When he returned from the injury, he failed to live up to expectations, producing just a .238 batting average. In August 1932, Shires was fired by Braves manager Bill McKechnie after he objected to plans to be sent back to the minor leagues. Shires eventually returned to the minor leagues and played for the Rochester Red Wings and the Columbus Red Birds in 1933. In 1934, Shires played for the Fort Worth Cats in the Texas League and, in 1935 he served as a player-manager for the Harrisburg Senators in the New York–Pennsylvania League.

== Post-baseball career ==
Shires announced plans to fight Max Baer for the World Heavyweight Boxing title and returned to the boxing ring in January 1935 but, was out of shape and was knocked out in the second round of a scheduled six round fight against Sid Hunter.

Shires was charged with murder following the beating death of a man in December 1948. The two men had fought after drinking together. The charge was later reduced to aggravated assault. A jury later found him guilty of aggravated assault and fined him $25.

Shires died on July 13, 1967 at the age of 60.
