= Art Fletcher =

American baseball player and manager (1884-1950)

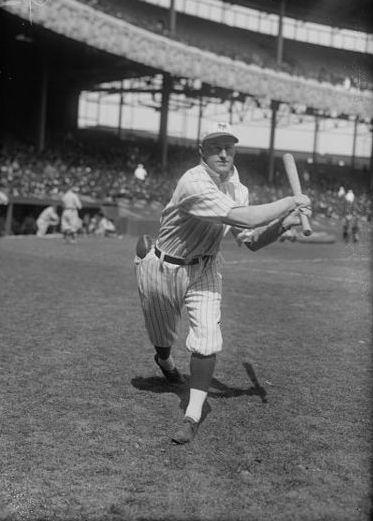
- Fletcher in 1920
- Shortstop / Manager
- Born: January 5, 1885; Collinsville, Illinois, U.S.
- Died: February 6, 1950 (aged 65); Los Angeles California, U.S.
- Batted: Right Threw: Right

MLB debut
- April 15, 1909, for the New York Giants

Last MLB appearance
- September 16, 1922, for the Philadelphia Phillies

MLB statistics
- Batting average: .277
- Home runs: 32
- Runs batted in: 676
- Managerial record: 237–383
- Winning %: .382
- Stats at Baseball Reference

Teams
- As player: New York Giants (1909–1920); Philadelphia Phillies (1920, 1922); As manager: Philadelphia Phillies (1923–1926); New York Yankees (1929); As coach: New York Yankees (1927–1928, 1929–1945)

Career highlights and awards
- 9× World Series champion (1927, 1928, 1932, 1936–1939, 1941, 1943)

Arthur Fletcher (January 5, 1885 – February 6, 1950) was an American shortstop, manager and coach in Major League Baseball. Fletcher was associated with two New York City baseball dynasties: the Giants of John McGraw as a player; and the Yankees of Miller Huggins and Joe McCarthy as a coach.

== Career ==
Born in Collinsville, Illinois, he batted and threw right-handed, stood 5 feet 10 inches (1.78 m) tall and weighed 170 pounds (77 kg).

Fletcher came to the Giants in 1909 after only one season of minor league experience, and became the club's regular shortstop two years later. He played in four World Series while performing for McGraw (1911, 1912, 1913 and 1917). Traded to the Philadelphia Phillies in the midst of the 1920 season, he retired after the 1922 campaign with 1,534 hits, 32 home runs, 676 RBI and a .277 batting average. Fletcher is the Giants' career leader in being hit by pitches (132) and ranks 29th on the MLB career list (141) for the same statistic.

In 1923 he replaced Kaiser Wilhelm as manager of the seventh-place Phillies and led the club through four losing seasons, bookended by last-place finishes in 1923 and 1926. In October 1926, he was replaced by Stuffy McInnis.

Fletcher then began a 19-year tenure (1927–1945) as a coach for the Yankees, where, beginning with the legendary 1927 team, he would participate on ten American League pennant winners and nine World Series champions.

Miller Huggins was sent to St. Vincent's Hospital in Greenwich Village on September 20, 1929 with a case of influenza on recommendation of Dr. Edward King, the Yankees' team doctor. With that, Fletcher and Charley O'Leary would take control of the team in his absence. Despite a blood transfusion on September 23, Ed Barrow stated that the health of the Yankees' manager was in bad shape due to erysipelas and that a priest had been called. Fletcher and O'Leary, coaching the Yankees at a game at Fenway Park in Boston, Massachusetts on September 25, were told by team secretary Mark Roth that Huggins died in Manhattan. Fletcher, O'Leary and pitching coach Bob Shawkey felt heartbroken about their passing and kept it quiet when they were notified on the news. Players for the Boston Red Sox were made aware as well about what had happened and the game had become quiet. After the fifth inning, players from both teams went to home plate with the umpires and watched as the American flag at Fenway was lowered to half-mast in honor of Huggins. Fletcher, enthralled with the opportunity Huggins gave him, turned down three opportunities to become a manager for different American League teams to be able to stay with Huggins. Fletcher, speaking for the team, who also talked to the press, chose to comment on the upcoming World Series and predicted that the Philadelphia Athletics would win it over the Chicago Cubs. Fletcher and O'Leary took a train from Boston after the game for Washington D.C. but were going to attend the funeral of Huggins first.

Immediate speculation was that Fletcher would replace Huggins as the manager for the 1930 season. Fletcher was considered the likeliest candidate and that while O'Leary was given the position as manager for the rest of the 1929 season, he felt Jacob Ruppert would put in Fletcher to continue the clubhouse Huggins had built. Huggins' funeral was held in Manhattan at the Church of the Transfiguration on September 27. Fletcher, Shawkey and O'Leary, along with Babe Ruth, Herb Pennock, Lou Gehrig, Earle Combs and Tony Lazzeri served as pallbearers of their manager's coffin before it was sent to Cincinnati, Ohio by train for burial. On October 17, 1929, Ruppert announced that Shawkey would become the manager of the Yankees for 1930 after Fletcher rejected the position. Ruppert noted that Huggins asked the owner c. 1924–1925 that his successor should be decided and pressured him to choose Fletcher. Before the death of Huggins, Ruppert asked Fletcher to take the position and he refused the position then. Following Huggins' death, Ruppert approached Fletcher with the option to manage in 1930, but rejected it a third time, stating that he would rather be a coach and not have the extra responsibility of being the manager.

=== Managerial record ===
Team	Year	Regular season					Postseason			
Team	Year	Games	Won	Lost	Win %	Finish	Won	Lost	Win %	Result
PHI	1923	154	50	104	.325	8th in NL	–	–	–	–
PHI	1924	151	55	96	.364	7th in NL	–	–	–	–
PHI	1925	153	68	85	.444	6th in NL	–	–	–	–
PHI	1926	151	58	93	.384	8th in NL	–	–	–	–
PHI total		609	231	378	.379		0	0	–	
NYY	1929	11	6	5	.545	2nd in AL	–	–	–	–
NYY total		11	6	5	.545		0	0	–	
Total		620	237	383	.382		0	0	–	

== Career after baseball ==
Fletcher, who had been serving as a part-time manager in 1945 with Joe McCarthy ill, suffered a heart attack on September 10 during a game against the Cleveland Indians while standing in the third base coach box. He suffered a second heart attack and he was rushed to St. Elizabeth's Hospital in Washington Heights, Manhattan, where he was placed in serious condition. Dr. Robert Walsh, who was serving as the team's physician told Fletcher that the heart attack was not a serious one but that he would have to stop coaching for the 1945 season to recover from it. At that time period, Fletcher had been considered a candidate to manage the team in the 1946 season if McCarthy chose to retire.

Fletcher suffered a third heart attack and was considered out of danger by September 18. However, he told the Yankees that he intended to retire after the 1945 season due to losing his interest for the travel and preparation for each season. He planned on moving to California and purchasing home in retirement. With a large inheritance from his father, a banker from Collinsville, he felt that he could move on. Fletcher would also end up suffering from pneumonia at the hospital, but by the beginning of October 1945, he was able to have visitors, with McCarthy the first to visit. On October 12, 1945, McCarthy announced that Bill Dickey would replace Fletcher as the second-level coach on the Yankees. Fletcher was released from the hospital on October 30 to his home in New York a week before he would leave for his home in Collinsville.

Fletcher died of another heart attack on February 6, 1950 while sitting in a car in Los Angeles, California with his wife, Irene on vacation from Collinsville. His funeral was held at Presbyterian Church in Collinsville on February 12. Fletcher would be buried in Glenwood Cemetery. McCarthy visited for the funeral, staying in St. Louis, Missouri before attending the service. It was while in the area he learned about the death of former teammate Kiki Cuyler.

== See also ==
- List of Major League Baseball career stolen bases leaders
