= 1929 Detroit Tigers season =

Major League Baseball season

1929 Detroit Tigers
- League: American League
- Ballpark: Navin Field
- City: Detroit, Michigan
- Record: 70–84 (.455)
- League place: 6th
- Owners: Frank Navin
- Managers: Bucky Harris
- Radio: WWJ (AM) (Ty Tyson)

The 1929 Detroit Tigers season was a season in American baseball. The team finished sixth in the American League with a record of 70–84, 36 games behind the Philadelphia Athletics.

== Regular season ==
=== Season standings ===
American League
Team	W	L	Pct.	GB	Home	Road
Philadelphia Athletics	104	46	.693	—	57‍–‍16	47‍–‍30
New York Yankees	88	66	.571	18	49‍–‍28	39‍–‍38
Cleveland Indians	81	71	.533	24	44‍–‍32	37‍–‍39
St. Louis Browns	79	73	.520	26	41‍–‍36	38‍–‍37
Washington Senators	71	81	.467	34	37‍–‍40	34‍–‍41
Detroit Tigers	70	84	.455	36	38‍–‍39	32‍–‍45
Chicago White Sox	59	93	.388	46	35‍–‍41	24‍–‍52
Boston Red Sox	58	96	.377	48	32‍–‍45	26‍–‍51

=== Record vs. opponents ===
1929 American League record Sources:
Team	BOS	CWS	CLE	DET	NYY	PHA	SLB	WSH
Boston	—	11–11	9–13	8–14	5–17	4–18	11–11–1	10–12
Chicago	11–11	—	9–12	10–12	6–16	9–13	4–17	10–12
Cleveland	13–9	12–9	—	11–11	14–8	7–14	10–12	14–8
Detroit	14–8	12–10	11–11	—	9–13	4–18	10–12	10–12–1
New York	17–5	16–6	8–14	13–9	—	8–14	14–8	12–10
Philadelphia	18–4	13–9	14–7	18–4	14–8	—	11–10–1	16–4
St. Louis	11–11–1	17–4	12–10	12–10	8–14	10–11–1	—	9–13
Washington	12–10	12–10	8–14	12–10–1	10–12	4–16	13–9	—

=== Roster ===
1929 Detroit Tigers
Roster
Pitchers: Frank Barnes; Josh Billings; Ownie Carroll; Skinny Graham; Art Herring; Elon Hogsett; Phil Page; Augie Prudhomme; George Smith; Vic Sorrell; Lil Stoner; George Uhle; Elam Vangilder; Earl Whitehill; Whit Wyatt; Emil Yde	Catchers: Pinky Hargrave; Ray Hayworth; Eddie Phillips; Merv Shea; Infielders: Bill Akers; Dale Alexander; Charlie Gehringer; Bucky Harris; Marty McManus; Nolen Richardson; Heinie Schuble; Frank Sigafoos; Yats Wuestling	Outfielders: Bob Fothergill; Harry Heilmann; Roy Johnson; Harry Rice; John Stone; Other batters: Larry Woodall	Manager: Bucky Harris; Coaches: George McBride; Benny Meyer

== Player stats ==
= Indicates team leader

= Indicates league leader

=== Batting ===
==== Starters by position ====
Note: Pos = Position; G = Games played; AB = At bats; H = Hits; Avg. = Batting average; HR = Home runs; RBI = Runs batted in

Pos	Player	G	AB	H	Avg.	HR	RBI
C	Eddie Phillips	68	221	52	.235	2	21
1B	Dale Alexander	155	626	215	.343	25	137
2B	Charlie Gehringer	155	634	215	.339	13	106
SS	Heinie Schuble	92	258	60	.233	2	28
3B	Marty McManus	154	599	168	.280	18	90
OF	Harry Heilmann	125	453	156	.344	15	120
OF	Harry Rice	130	536	163	.304	6	69
OF	Roy Johnson	148	640	201	.314	10	69

==== Other batters ====
Note: G = Games played; AB = At bats; H = Hits; Avg. = Batting average; HR = Home runs; RBI = Runs batted in

Player	G	AB	H	Avg.	HR	RBI
Bob Fothergill	115	277	98	.354	6	62
Pinky Hargrave	76	185	61	.330	3	26
Merv Shea	50	162	47	.290	3	24
Yats Wuestling	54	150	30	.200	0	16
John Stone	51	150	39	.260	2	15
Bill Akers	24	83	22	.265	1	9
Ray Hayworth	14	43	11	.256	0	4
Frank Sigafoos	14	23	4	.174	0	2
Nolen Richardson	13	21	4	.190	0	2
Bucky Harris	7	11	1	.091	0	0
Larry Woodall	1	1	0	.000	0	0

=== Pitching ===
==== Starting pitchers ====
Note: G = Games pitched; IP = Innings pitched; W = Wins; L = Losses; ERA = Earned run average; SO = Strikeouts

Player	G	IP	W	L	ERA	SO
George Uhle	32	249.0	15	11	4.08	100
Earl Whitehill	38	245.1	14	15	4.62	103
Vic Sorrell	36	226.0	14	15	5.18	81
Ownie Carroll	34	202.0	9	17	4.63	54
Art Herring	4	32.0	2	1	4.78	15
Elon Hogsett	4	28.2	1	2	2.83	9
Whit Wyatt	4	25.1	0	1	6.75	14

==== Other pitchers ====
Note: G = Games pitched; IP = Innings pitched; W = Wins; L = Losses; ERA = Earned run average; SO = Strikeouts

Player	G	IP	W	L	ERA	SO
Augie Prudhomme	34	94.0	1	6	6.22	26
Emil Yde	29	86.2	7	3	5.30	23
Skinny Graham	13	51.2	1	3	5.57	7
George Smith	14	35.2	3	2	5.80	13
Phil Page	10	25.1	0	2	8.17	6
Frank Barnes	4	5.0	0	1	7.20	0

==== Relief pitchers ====
Note: G = Games pitched; W = Wins; L = Losses; SV = Saves; ERA = Earned run average; SO = Strikeouts

Player	G	W	L	SV	ERA	SO
Lil Stoner	24	3	3	4	5.26	12
Josh Billings	8	0	1	0	5.12	1
Elam Vangilder	6	0	1	0	6.35	3

== Farm system ==
Level	Team	League	Manager
A	Fort Worth Panthers	Texas League	Jake Atz and Frank Snyder
B	Evansville Hubs	Illinois–Indiana–Iowa League	Bob Coleman
C	Wheeling Stogies	Middle Atlantic League	Raymond Haley
C	Fort Smith Twins	Western Association	John Cimpi
D	Hanover Raiders	Blue Ridge League	Bobby Prysock

LEAGUE CHAMPIONS: Fort Smith
