= Dan Dugan =

Dan Dugan may refer to:

- Dan Dugan (baseball) (1907–1968), American baseball pitcher for the Chicago White Sox in 1928–29
- Dan Dugan (audio engineer) (born 1943), American audio engineer, the inventor of the automixer
- Dan Dugan, television producer associated with The Random Years and The Game
