= Mule Haas =

American baseball player and coach (1903–1974)

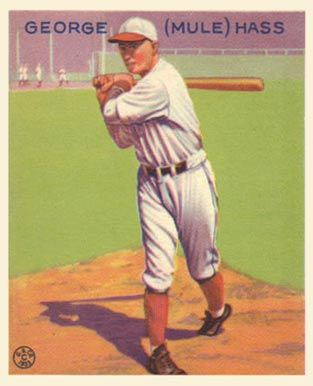
- Center fielder
- Born: October 15, 1903; Montclair, New Jersey, U.S.
- Died: June 30, 1974 (aged 70); New Orleans, Louisiana, U.S.
- Batted: Left Threw: Right

MLB debut
- August 15, 1925, for the Pittsburgh Pirates

Last MLB appearance
- September 1, 1938, for the Philadelphia Athletics

MLB statistics
- Batting average: .292
- Home runs: 43
- Runs batted in: 496
- Stats at Baseball Reference

Teams
- Pittsburgh Pirates (1925); Philadelphia Athletics (1928–1932); Chicago White Sox (1933–1937); Philadelphia Athletics (1938)

Career highlights and awards
- 2× World Series champion (1929, 1930)

George William "Mule" Haas (October 15, 1903 – June 30, 1974) was an American professional baseball player. He played as a center fielder in Major League Baseball from 1925 through 1938, most notably as a member of the Philadelphia Athletics dynasty that won three consecutive American League pennants from 1929 to 1931 and won the World Series in 1929 and 1930.

== Professional baseball career ==
Haas was born in Montclair, New Jersey, and attended Montclair High School. He left school to play for a local semi-pro team. Haas was signed by the Pittsburgh Pirates as an amateur free agent in 1923 and, after three seasons spent playing in the minor leagues, he made his major league debut with the Pirates on August 15, 1925 at the age of 21. He appeared in four games for the Pirates but, was not on the team's roster when the Pirates defeated the Washington Senators in the 1925 World Series. His contract was then sold to the Atlanta Crackers of the Southern Association and he returned to the minor leagues for two more seasons.

In 1928, Haas joined the Philadelphia Athletics and became a member of one of the most feared batting orders in the history of baseball featuring three future Baseball Hall of Fame members (Al Simmons, Jimmie Foxx, and Mickey Cochrane). He was one of six Athletics players to post batting averages above .310 during the 1929 season when he produced career-highs in batting average (.323), home runs (16) and runs batted in (82). The Athletics won the 1929 American League pennant by 18 games over the vaunted New York Yankees of Babe Ruth and Lou Gehrig.

Haas is notable for his hitting performance during the 1929 World Series against the Chicago Cubs. In Game 4 at Philadelphia, as the Athletics trailed 8–0 in the seventh inning, Haas hit a three-run inside-the-park home run as the Athletics rallied by scoring ten runs in the inning to win, 10–8. This was the ninth inside-the-park home run in World Series history, and the last until Alcides Escobar did so in Game 1 of the 2015 World Series. Two days later, in what was to be the final game of the Series, Haas hit a two-run home run in the bottom of the ninth inning to tie the score, 2–2, as the Athletics later won the game on Bing Miller's RBI-double.

With the onset of the Great Depression and declining attendance, Connie Mack sought to reduce expenses by selling or trading his best players. In September 1932, he sold Haas, Simmons and Jimmy Dykes to the Chicago White Sox for $100,000. After five seasons in Chicago, Haas ended his career back in Philadelphia, playing in his final major league game on September 1, 1938 at the age of 34.

== Career statistics ==
In a twelve-year major league career, Haas played in 1,168 games, accumulating 1,257 hits in 4,303 at bats for a .292 career batting average, along with 43 home runs, 496 runs batted in and a career on-base percentage of .359. Haas had a career fielding percentage of .983; he played at all three outfield positions and first base.

== Later life ==
Haas died in New Orleans, Louisiana, on June 30, 1974, at the age of 70. He was buried in the Roman Catholic Immaculate Conception Cemetery in his native Montclair, New Jersey.
