= Jake Dunn =

American baseball player (1909–1984)

- Shortstop / Outfielder / Manager
- Born: November 5, 1909; Luther, Oklahoma, U.S.
- Died: July 24, 1984 (aged 74); Los Angeles, California, U.S.
- Batted: Right Threw: Right

Negro league baseball debut
- 1930, for the Detroit Stars

Last appearance
- 1940, for the Philadelphia Stars
- Stats at Baseball Reference

Teams
- Detroit Stars (1930); Washington Pilots (1932); Baltimore Black Sox (1933); Nashville Elite Giants (1933); Philadelphia Stars (1934–1940)

Joseph P. Dunn, Jr. (November 5, 1909 – July 24, 1984) was an American professional baseball shortstop and outfielder in the Negro leagues. He played from 1930 to 1940, mostly with the Philadelphia Stars. He served in the United States military during World War II for four years. He also managed the Stars in 1939 and 1940.
