= Grif Teller =

American painter (1899–1993)

- Born: December 9, 1899; Newark, New Jersey
- Died: April 8, 1993 (aged 93); Westfield, New Jersey
- Resting place: Immaculate Conception Cemetery
- Occupation: Artist
- Known for: Pennsylvania Railroad wall calendar paintings
- Spouse: Mabel
- Children: Robert, John and Ruth
- Parent(s): Albert D. and Mary H. Teller

Griffith Harold "Grif" Teller (December 9, 1899 – April 8, 1993) was an artist best known for his paintings for the Pennsylvania Railroad.

== Early life ==
Teller was born on December 9, 1899, in Newark, New Jersey. Teller attended the Barringer High School until his junior year, when he transferred to the Fawcett School of Industrial Arts. With what started as a temporary job with the Osborne Company, an advertising and color calendar company, towards the end of World War I, Teller was hired permanently after showing the head of Osborne's Designing Department some of his paintings.

He was a long-time resident of Little Falls, New Jersey.

== Career ==
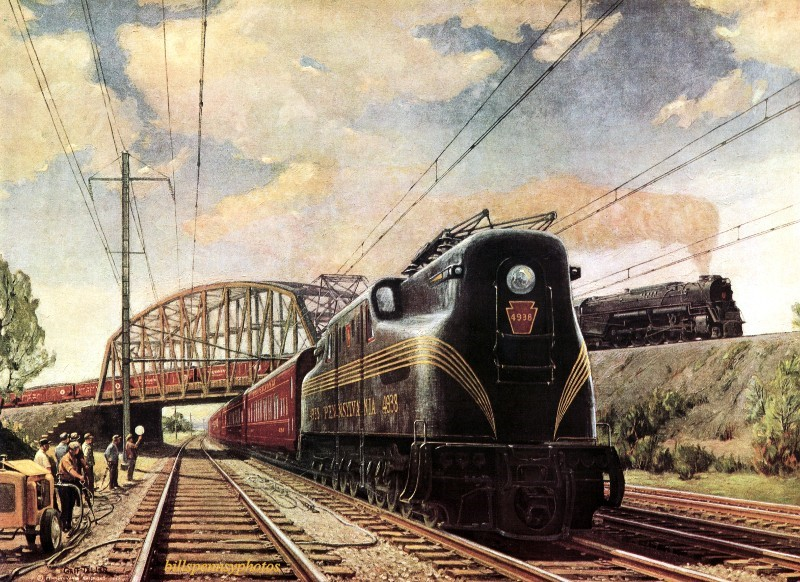
Painting for the 1949 calendar, titled Main Lines—Freight and Passenger

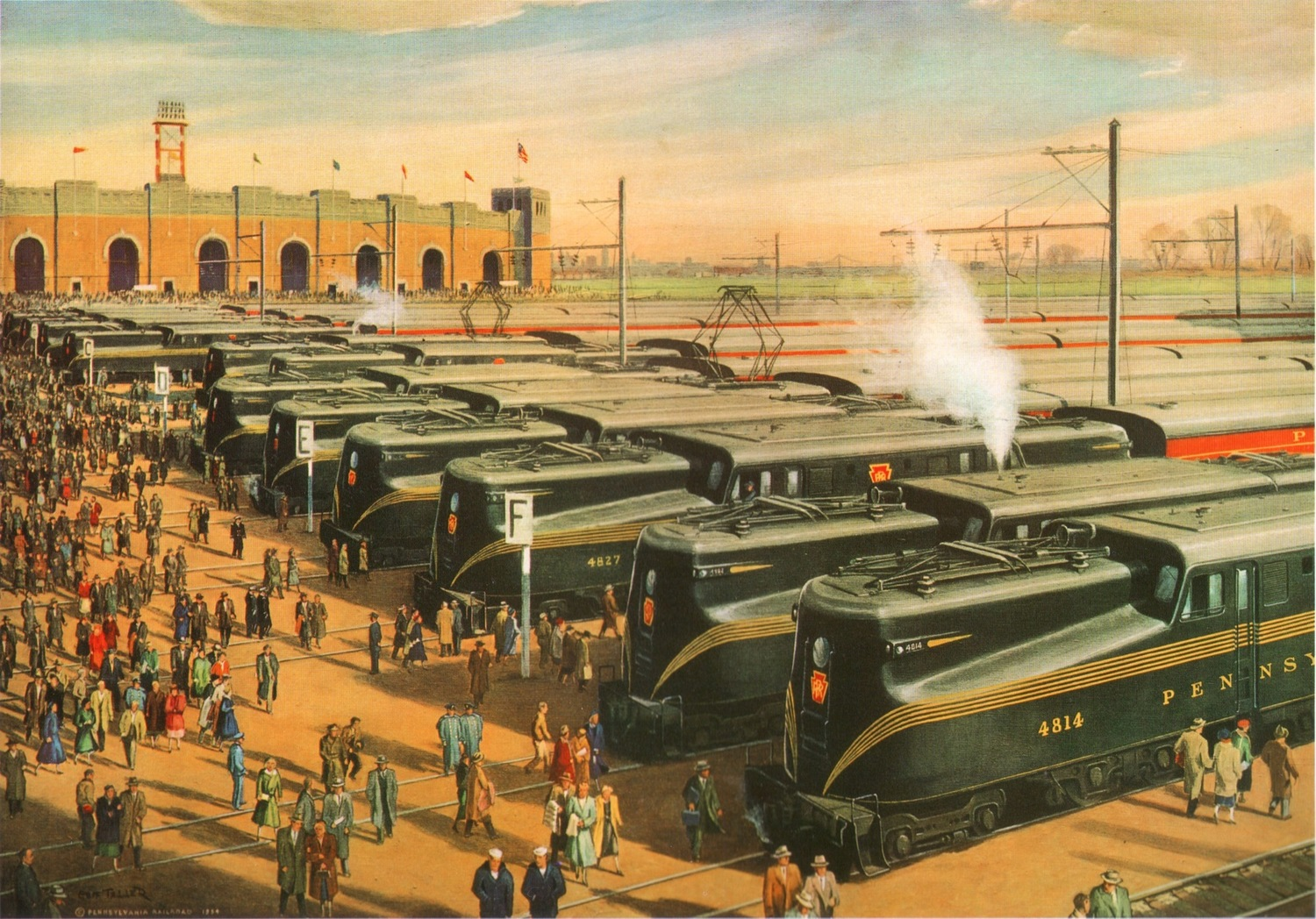
Painting for the 1955 calendar, titled Mass Transportation

In 1927, Teller was given an assignment to paint the 1928 wall calendar scene for the Pennsylvania Railroad. The Pennsylvania returned to Teller the next year, and he eventually painted all of the calendar scenes for their calendars up to 1942. Other artists were contracted to paint the artwork for the calendar during World War II, as the Pennsylvania was favoring more patriotic scenes. Teller painted for the Pennsylvania once again after the war, starting with the 1947 calendar. The Osborne Company was sold to a competitor in 1953, eventually causing Teller to be laid off. He continued to paint for the Pennsylvania as a freelancer, until the railroad discontinued full-size wall calendars in 1959. His freelance work, which encompassed both railroad and non-railroad subjects, continued into the 1980s.

Teller's 1928 painting When the Broadway Meets the Dawn was used as the background for the "Preserve Our Heritage" special-fund license plate introduced in 1998 by PennDOT to help fund Pennsylvania Historical and Museum Commission programs, which are still sold as of 2025.
