= Luther, Oklahoma =

- Town
- Seal

- Location in Oklahoma County and the state of Oklahoma.
- Coordinates: 35°39′38″N 97°11′29″W
- Country: United States
- State: Oklahoma
- County: Oklahoma

Area
  - Total: 15.76 sq mi (40.82 km^{2})
  - Land: 15.76 sq mi (40.82 km^{2})
  - Water: 0 sq mi (0.00 km^{2})
- Elevation: 902 ft (275 m)

Population (2020)
  - Total: 1,492
  - Density: 94.7/sq mi (36.55/km^{2})
- Time zone: UTC-6 (Central (CST))
  - Summer (DST): UTC-5 (CDT)
- ZIP code: 73054
- Area code: 405
- FIPS code: 40-44500
- GNIS feature ID: 2412925
- Website: townoflutherok.com

Luther is a town in Oklahoma County, Oklahoma, United States, and a part of the Oklahoma City Metropolitan Area. As of the 2020 census, Luther had a population of 1,492.

Luther owes its existence to Charles Gasham "Gristmill" Jones, who platted the land and sold it for a profit. The town of Luther would be named after Charles Gasham "Gristmill" Jones's son from his first marriage.

== Geography ==
According to the United States Census Bureau, the town has a total area of 45 square miles (120 km^{2}), all land.

Luther is located in the Cross Timbers ecoregion and the Frontier Country tourism region.

== Demographics ==
Historical population
Census	Pop.	Note	%±
1910	310		—
1920	601		93.9%
1930	613		2.0%
1940	425		−30.7%
1950	409		−3.8%
1960	517		26.4%
1970	836		61.7%
1980	1,159		38.6%
1990	1,560		34.6%
2000	612		−60.8%
2010	1,221		99.5%
2020	1,492		22.2%
U.S. Decennial Census

=== 2020 census ===
As of the 2020 census, Luther had a population of 1,492. The median age was 35.2 years. 26.9% of residents were under the age of 18 and 13.2% of residents were 65 years of age or older. For every 100 females there were 98.9 males, and for every 100 females age 18 and over there were 96.2 males age 18 and over.

0.0% of residents lived in urban areas, while 100.0% lived in rural areas.

There were 513 households in Luther, of which 41.1% had children under the age of 18 living in them. Of all households, 57.3% were married-couple households, 16.4% were households with a male householder and no spouse or partner present, and 18.5% were households with a female householder and no spouse or partner present. About 16.8% of all households were made up of individuals and 5.8% had someone living alone who was 65 years of age or older.

There were 569 housing units, of which 9.8% were vacant. The homeowner vacancy rate was 1.9% and the rental vacancy rate was 7.2%.

Racial composition as of the 2020 census
Race	Number	Percent
White	1,061	71.1%
Black or African American	77	5.2%
American Indian and Alaska Native	87	5.8%
Asian	4	0.3%
Native Hawaiian and Other Pacific Islander	1	0.1%
Some other race	43	2.9%
Two or more races	219	14.7%
Hispanic or Latino (of any race)	128	8.6%

== Transportation ==
Luther is located northeast of Oklahoma City on Oklahoma State Highway 66, formerly U.S. 66. Like many towns between Oklahoma City and Tulsa, Luther was bypassed by opening of the Turner Turnpike in 1953. After decades of planning, a new interchange 11 miles (18 km) east of I-35 was opened at Hogback Road south of Luther in 2011, granting more commuter access between Luther and Oklahoma City.

== Notable people ==
- George Blackerby, Major League Baseball player
- Jake Dunn, Negro league baseball player
