= Rudy Miller =

American college athlete and professional baseball player

- Miller during his time with the Western Michigan Broncos football team
- Infielder
- Born: July 12, 1900; Kalamazoo, Michigan
- Died: January 22, 1994 (aged 93); Kalamazoo, Michigan
- Batted: Right Threw: Right

MLB debut
- September 19, 1929, for the Philadelphia Athletics

Last MLB appearance
- September 20, 1929, for the Philadelphia Athletics

MLB statistics
- Batting average: .250
- Home runs: 0
- Runs batted in: 1
- Stats at Baseball Reference

Teams
- Philadelphia Athletics (1929)

Rudel Charles Miller (July 12, 1900 – January 22, 1994) was an multi-sport college athlete at Western Michigan University and a professional baseball infielder. He played two games for the 1929 Philadelphia Athletics of Major League Baseball (MLB).

== Biography ==
Miller earner 15 varsity letters with the Western Michigan Broncos, a school record. He earned letters in football (4; 1920–1923), basketball (4; 1921–1924), baseball (4; 1921–1924), and track (3; 1920, 1921, 1924). In his senior year on the baseball team, he had a .441 batting average.

Miller played a total of 448 games in minor league baseball across four seasons from 1925–1929. Primarily a second baseman, he also played four games as an outfielder.

During the 1929 season, Miller played two games with the Philadelphia Athletics. He had one hit in four at bats, three walks, and one RBI. His only hit was thrown by Ownie Carroll of the Detroit Tigers. Defensively, Miller played both games at third base, making two errors in eight total chances for a .750 fielding percentage.

In 1900, Miller owned a sporting goods store his home city of Kalamazoo. He was inducted to the Western Michigan University athletic hall of fame in 1974. Miller died and was interred in 1994 in Kalamazoo.
