= Immaculate Conception Cemetery, Montclair =

Immaculate Conception Cemetery
- Interactive map of Immaculate Conception Cemetery

Details
- Location: Montclair, New Jersey
- Coordinates: 40.854°N 74.194°W
- Type: Roman Catholic
- No. of interments: >27,000
- Website: Official website
- Find a Grave: 641095

Immaculate Conception Cemetery is a Roman Catholic cemetery in the Upper Montclair neighborhood of Montclair in New Jersey, United States.

== Notable burials ==
- Angelo Bertelli (1921–1999), 1943 Heisman Trophy winner.
- Mule Haas (1903–1974), MLB center fielder.
- Lou Monte (1917–1989), singer of funny Italian songs, like "Pepino, the Italian Mouse" (1962).
- Bob Hooper (1922–1980), MLB pitcher
- Ed Reulbach (1882–1961), MLB pitcher.
- Grif Teller (1899–1993), artist famous for his paintings for the Pennsylvania Railroad.
