= Al Simmons =

American baseball player (1902–1956)

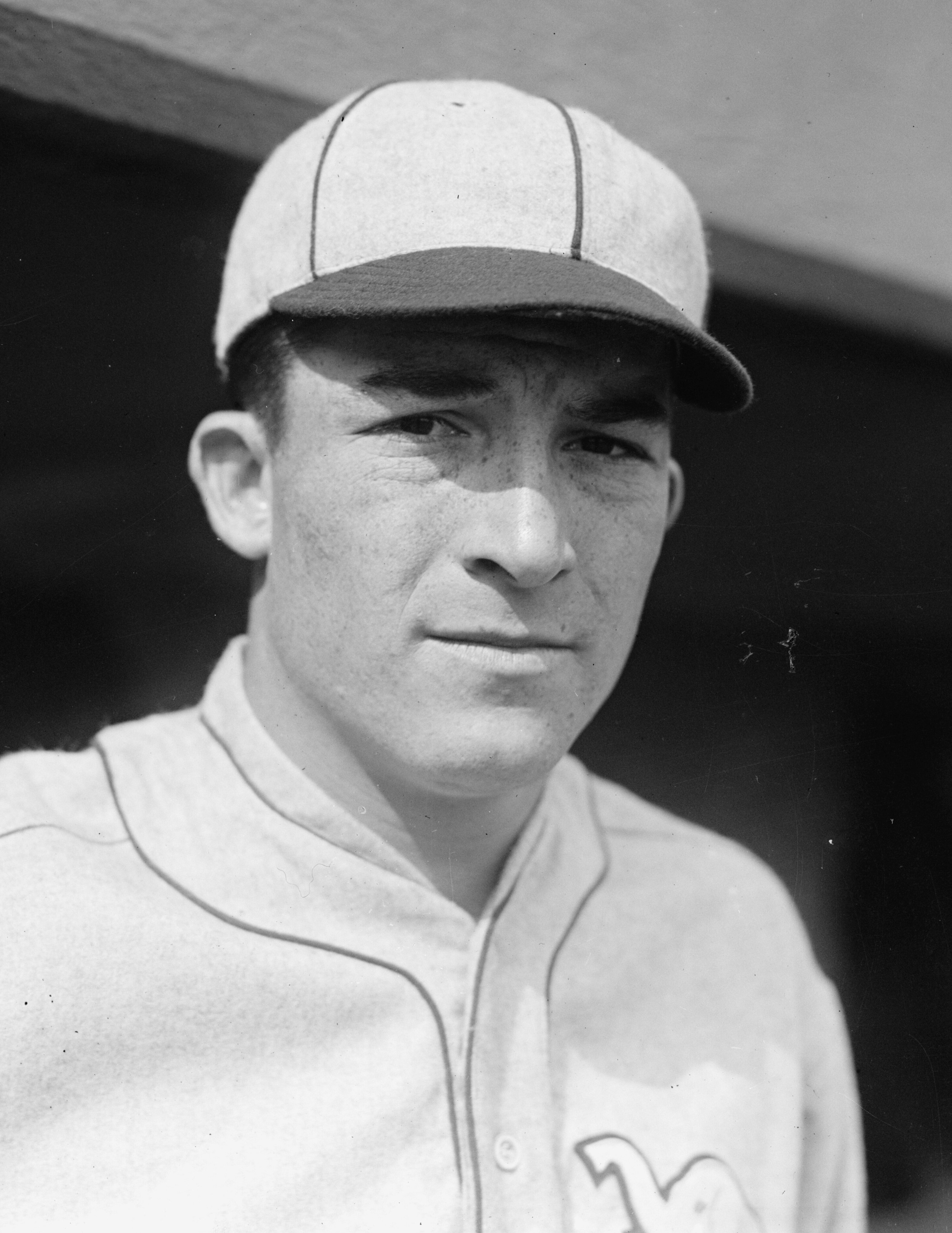
- Simmons in 1924
- Outfielder
- Born: Alois Szymanski; May 22, 1902; Milwaukee, Wisconsin, U.S.
- Died: May 26, 1956 (aged 54); Milwaukee, Wisconsin, U.S.
- Batted: Right Threw: Right

MLB debut
- April 15, 1924, for the Philadelphia Athletics

Last MLB appearance
- July 1, 1944, for the Philadelphia Athletics

MLB statistics
- Batting average: .334
- Hits: 2,927
- Home runs: 307
- Runs batted in: 1,828
- Stats at Baseball Reference

Teams
- Philadelphia Athletics (1924–1932); Chicago White Sox (1933–1935); Detroit Tigers (1936); Washington Senators (1937–1938); Boston Bees (1939); Cincinnati Reds (1939); Philadelphia Athletics (1940–1941); Boston Red Sox (1943); Philadelphia Athletics (1944)

Career highlights and awards
- 3× All-Star (1933–1935); 2× World Series champion (1929, 1930); 2× AL batting champion (1930, 1931); AL RBI leader (1929); Philadelphia Baseball Wall of Fame; Athletics Hall of Fame

Member of the National

Baseball Hall of Fame
- Induction: 1953
- Vote: 75.4% (ninth ballot)

Aloysius Harry Simmons (born Alois Szymanski; May 22, 1902 – May 26, 1956) was an American professional baseball outfielder who played 20 seasons in Major League Baseball (MLB). Nicknamed "Bucketfoot Al", he had his best years with Connie Mack's Philadelphia Athletics during the late 1920s and early 1930s, winning two World Series with the team. Simmons also played for the Chicago White Sox, Detroit Tigers, Washington Senators, Boston Bees, Cincinnati Reds and Boston Red Sox. After his playing career, Simmons served as a coach for the Athletics and Cleveland Indians. A career .334 hitter, Simmons was inducted into the Baseball Hall of Fame in 1953.

== Early life ==
Simmons was born in Milwaukee and grew up as a fan of the Philadelphia Athletics. In the fourth grade, he received a spanking from his father for insisting that he wanted to play professional baseball. When he persisted in asserting his desire to be a baseball player, his father replied that he had better become a good player. Simmons was known by his birth surname (Szymanski), until he was playing for a local minor league team and he was tired of hearing people mispronounce it. He saw an advertisement for a company named Simmons Hardware and decided to take on the last name of Simmons.

== Playing career ==
=== Philadelphia Athletics (1924–1932) ===
In 1925, his second season with Philadelphia, Simmons led the AL with 253 hits and 392 total bases, while posting a .387 batting average, 24 home runs and 129 runs batted in (RBI). He scored 122 runs, hit 43 doubles, and finished with a .599 slugging percentage. Simmons's 85 multi-hit games constitute a single-season MLB record. He earned the second-most votes for the league's Most Valuable Player Award. In the following three seasons, he hit .341, .392 and .351 and drove in 110, 108 and 107 runs in those respective years, while finishing fifth in 1926 MVP voting and fourth in 1927.

Simmons led the A's to the AL pennant in 1929, as Philadelphia went 104–46, finishing 18 games ahead of the New York Yankees. The A's went on to defeat the Chicago Cubs in five games to win the World Series. That season, he hit .365 with 34 home runs and led the AL with 157 RBI. He also scored 114 runs, had 212 hits with 41 doubles and a .642 slugging percentage. In the 1929 World Series, Simmons batted .300 with two home runs, five RBIs and scored six runs.

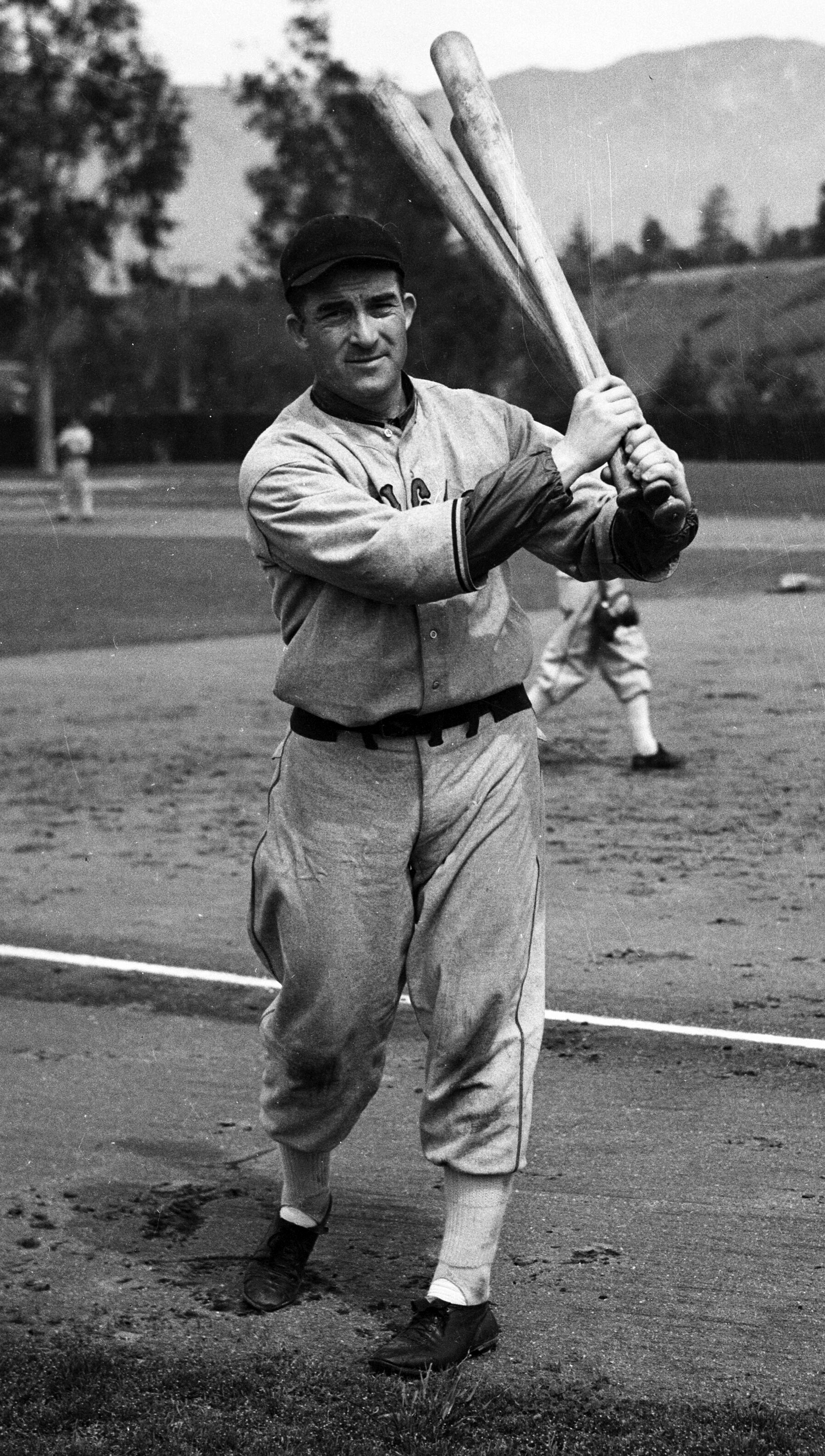
Simmons in an undated 1930s photograph

Simmons's best year as a player was in 1930, when he won his first of successive batting titles, hitting .381 with 36 home runs, 211 hits, 41 doubles and 16 triples. He had a slugging percentage of .708, drove in 165 runs and scored 152 runs in 138 games. The A's won the AL pennant again, going 102–52, and defeated the St. Louis Cardinals to win back-to-back World Series titles. In the 1930 World Series, Simmons batted .364 with two home runs and four RBI with a .727 slugging percentage.

In 1931, the A's won their third straight AL pennant, by 13.5 games over the Yankees, going 107–45. Simmons won his second batting title, hitting .390 with 22 home runs, 128 RBI, 100 runs scored, 200 hits, 37 doubles, 13 triples and a .641 slugging percentage while playing in only 128 games. He finished third in AL MVP voting behind his MVP teammate Lefty Grove and the Yankees' Lou Gehrig. The A's were upset in their quest for a third consecutive World Series title, losing the 1931 World Series in seven games to the Cardinals. Simmons hit .333 with two home runs and eight RBI in the series.

In a final season with Philadelphia, Simmons led the AL with 216 hits. He batted .322, with 35 home runs, 151 RBIs and 144 runs scored in 1932. Simmons finished his Athletics tenure with a .356 batting average, 209 home runs, 1,179 RBI and 969 runs scored in 1,290 games. He drove in 100+ runs in all nine seasons and scored 100 or more runs in five seasons. In three World Series appearances for the A's, Simmons hit .333 with six home runs, 17 RBI and 15 runs scored in 18 games.

=== Later career (1933–1944) ===
In late September 1932, the Athletics sold Simmons, Mule Haas and Jimmy Dykes to the Chicago White Sox for cash. The amount of the purchase was not disclosed at the time the sale was reported, though it was said to be the largest cash purchase ever made by the White Sox and possibly the largest purchase in AL history. Newspaper reports speculated that Athletics owner Connie Mack might be breaking apart the Athletics team that had been so successful between 1929 and 1931.

During his first season in Chicago, Simmons batted .331 with 14 home runs, 119 RBI and 200 hits. In 1934, he batted .344 with 18 home runs, 104 RBI, 102 runs scored and 192 hits in 138 games. After a disappointing final season with the White Sox, which saw Simmons bat just. 267 with 16 home runs and 79 RBI in 128 games (the first time in his 11-year career he did not reach .300 and 100+ RBI), he rebounded by hitting .327 with 13 home runs, 112 RBI and 96 runs scored in 1936 for the Detroit Tigers.

In 1937, he struggled again, this time with the Washington Senators, batting just .279 with 8 home runs and 84 RBIs in 103 games. He rebounded with a stellar season in 1938, batting .302 with 21 home runs and 95 RBI in just 125 games for Washington. His 21 home runs that year gave Simmons the distinction of being the first player to hit 20 home runs in a year for the Senators.

Simmons was purchased from the Senators by the Boston Bees in December 1938. The purchase price was not immediately revealed, though Simmons was reported as not getting along with Senators owner Clark Griffith.

Simmons was purchased from the Bees by the Cincinnati Reds on August 31, 1939. The Reds won the NL pennant that year, and Simmons got to play in his final World Series. He played in one game in the 1939 World Series, going one for four with a double and a run scored.

Simmons played in the major leagues until 1944, when he finished his career with his original team, the Philadelphia Athletics.

=== Overview ===
Simmons was one of the best hitters in MLB history. He had a career batting average of .334. He hit .340 or better in eight different seasons, with four seasons of better than .380. He recorded a .300 batting average and 100 or more RBI in his first 11 major league seasons.

Simmons accumulated 1,500 hits in 1,040 games and 2,000 hits in 1,393 games, numbers that remain the fewest games needed to attain both marks in major league history. He compiled 200 hits or better in a season six times, with five of those being consecutive (1929–33), and had 199 and 192 hits in 1926 and 1934. He compiled more hits than any right-handed batter in AL history until he was surpassed by Al Kaline.

Simmons recorded 8 five-hit games and 60 four-hit games in the majors; he still ranks in the top ten for each category.

Simmons hit 307 career home runs, finishing in the top six in AL in home runs for seven consecutive seasons (1925–32). In 19 World Series games, he hit .329 with 6 home runs, 17 RBI, 15 runs scored and a .658 slugging percentage. He was also a fine outfielder in his era, recording a career .982 fielding percentage. He recorded exactly 5,000 putouts in his MLB career.

Simmons was nicknamed "Bucketfoot Al" because he strode toward third base when hitting, hence hitting "with his foot in the bucket", an old baseball term.

=== Career statistics ===
Category	Years	G	AB	R	H	2B	3B	HR	RBI	SB	BB	AVG	OBP	SLG	OPS	FLD%
Total	20	2,215	8,759	1,507	2,927	539	149	307	1,828	88	615	.334	.380	.535	.915	.982

== Later life and legacy ==
After his playing days ended, Simmons served as a coach for Mack's Athletics (1945–49) and the Cleveland Indians (1950). In early April 1951, Simmons announced he was dealing with an undisclosed illness and would be stepping down as a coach of the Indians. While Cleveland manager Al López encouraged Simmons to think about his decision, Simmons said he could no longer help the team.

Simmons died on May 26, 1956. He had collapsed on a sidewalk near the Milwaukee Athletic Club, where he lived, and was thought to have suffered a heart attack. He was pronounced dead at a hospital a short time later. He was buried at St. Adalbert's Cemetery in Milwaukee.

Simmons was elected to the Wisconsin Athletic Hall of Fame in 1951, the National Baseball Hall of Fame in 1953, and the National Polish-American Sports Hall of Fame in 1975.

In 1999, Simmons ranked number 43 on The Sporting News' list of the 100 Greatest Baseball Players, and was a nominee for the Major League Baseball All-Century Team. In the 2001 book The New Bill James Historical Baseball Abstract, Bill James ranked Simmons as the 71st greatest baseball player of all time and the seventh greatest MLB left fielder of all time.

== See also ==
- List of Major League Baseball career home run leaders
- List of Major League Baseball career hits leaders
- List of Major League Baseball career doubles leaders
- List of Major League Baseball career triples leaders
- List of Major League Baseball career runs scored leaders
- List of Major League Baseball career runs batted in leaders
- List of Major League Baseball career total bases leaders
- List of Major League Baseball career batting average leaders
- List of Major League Baseball career slugging percentage leaders
- List of Major League Baseball career OPS leaders
- List of Major League Baseball batting champions
- List of Major League Baseball annual runs scored leaders
- List of Major League Baseball annual runs batted in leaders
