= 1929 New York Yankees season =

Season for the Major League Baseball team the New York Yankees

1929 New York Yankees
- League: American League
- Ballpark: Yankee Stadium
- City: New York City, New York
- Record: 88–66 (.571)
- League place: 2nd
- Owners: Jacob Ruppert
- General managers: Ed Barrow
- Managers: Miller Huggins (12th season, 82–61, .573); Art Fletcher (1st season, 6–5, .545)

The 1929 New York Yankees season was the team's 27th season. The team finished with a record of 88–66, finishing in second place, 18 games behind the Philadelphia Athletics. This ended a streak of three straight World Series appearances for the club. New York was managed by Miller Huggins until his death on September 25. They played at Yankee Stadium.

== Regular season ==
- April 16, 1929: The New York Yankees took to the field with uniform numbers for the first time on the backs on their uniforms, the first team to make them permanent.

=== Season standings ===
American League
Team	W	L	Pct.	GB	Home	Road
Philadelphia Athletics	104	46	.693	—	57‍–‍16	47‍–‍30
New York Yankees	88	66	.571	18	49‍–‍28	39‍–‍38
Cleveland Indians	81	71	.533	24	44‍–‍32	37‍–‍39
St. Louis Browns	79	73	.520	26	41‍–‍36	38‍–‍37
Washington Senators	71	81	.467	34	37‍–‍40	34‍–‍41
Detroit Tigers	70	84	.455	36	38‍–‍39	32‍–‍45
Chicago White Sox	59	93	.388	46	35‍–‍41	24‍–‍52
Boston Red Sox	58	96	.377	48	32‍–‍45	26‍–‍51

=== Record vs. opponents ===
1929 American League record Sources:
Team	BOS	CWS	CLE	DET	NYY	PHA	SLB	WSH
Boston	—	11–11	9–13	8–14	5–17	4–18	11–11–1	10–12
Chicago	11–11	—	9–12	10–12	6–16	9–13	4–17	10–12
Cleveland	13–9	12–9	—	11–11	14–8	7–14	10–12	14–8
Detroit	14–8	12–10	11–11	—	9–13	4–18	10–12	10–12–1
New York	17–5	16–6	8–14	13–9	—	8–14	14–8	12–10
Philadelphia	18–4	13–9	14–7	18–4	14–8	—	11–10–1	16–4
St. Louis	11–11–1	17–4	12–10	12–10	8–14	10–11–1	—	9–13
Washington	12–10	12–10	8–14	12–10–1	10–12	4–16	13–9	—

=== Roster ===
Beginning from that year onward the Yankees put the players' jersey numbers on the backs of their white home and grey road uniforms, making them the first MLB team to put player numbers in their uniforms on a permanent basis.

1929 New York Yankees
Roster
Pitchers: 17 Fred Heimach; 12 Waite Hoyt; 15 Hank Johnson; 18 Wilcy Moore; 30 Bots Nekola; 11 Herb Pennock; 14 George Pipgras; 21,30 Gordon Rhodes; 31 Roy Sherid; 20 Myles Thomas; 19 Ed Wells; 16 Tom Zachary	Catchers: 9 Benny Bengough; 10 Bill Dickey; 8 Johnny Grabowski; 15,32 Arndt Jorgens; Infielders: 7 Leo Durocher; 4 Lou Gehrig; 2 Mark Koenig; 24 Lyn Lary; 6 Tony Lazzeri; 22 Gene Robertson; 20 Julie Wera	Outfielders: 27 Sammy Byrd; 1 Earle Combs; 26 Cedric Durst; 5 Bob Meusel; 25 Ben Paschal; 3 Babe Ruth; Other batters: 21 George Burns; 28 Liz Funk	Manager: 34 Art Fletcher; -- Miller Huggins; Coaches: 34 Art Fletcher; -- Harry Mathews; 33 Charley O'Leary; 29 Bob Shawkey

== Player stats ==
= Indicates team leader

= Indicates league leader

=== Batting ===
==== Starters by position ====
Note: Pos = Position; G = Games played; AB = At bats; H = Hits; Avg. = Batting average; HR = Home runs; RBI = Runs batted in

Pos	Player	G	AB	H	Avg.	HR	RBI
C	Bill Dickey	130	447	145	.324	10	65
1B	Lou Gehrig	154	553	166	.300	35	126
2B	Tony Lazzeri	147	545	193	.354	18	106
3B	Gene Robertson	90	309	92	.298	0	35
SS	Leo Durocher	100	341	84	.246	0	32
LF	Earle Combs	142	586	202	.345	3	65
CF	Bob Meusel	100	391	102	.261	10	57
RF	Babe Ruth	135	499	172	.345	46	154

==== Other batters ====
Note: G = Games played; AB = At bats; H = Hits; Avg. = Batting average; HR = Home runs; RBI = Runs batted in

Player	G	AB	H	Avg.	HR	RBI
Mark Koenig	116	373	109	.292	3	41
Lyn Lary	80	236	73	.309	5	26
Cedric Durst	92	202	52	.257	4	31
Samuel Byrd	62	170	53	.312	5	28
Ben Paschal	42	72	15	.208	2	11
Benny Bengough	23	62	12	.194	0	7
Johnny Grabowski	22	59	12	.203	0	2
Arndt Jorgens	18	34	11	.324	0	4
Julie Wera	5	12	5	.417	0	2
George Burns	9	9	0	.000	0	0
Liz Funk	1	0	0	----	0	0

=== Pitching ===
==== Starting pitchers ====
Note: G = Games pitched; IP = Innings pitched; W = Wins; L = Losses; ERA = Earned run average; SO = Strikeouts

Player	G	IP	W	L	ERA	SO
George Pipgras	39	225.1	18	12	4.23	125
Waite Hoyt	30	201.2	10	9	4.24	57
Ed Wells	31	193.1	13	9	4.33	78
Herb Pennock	27	157.1	9	11	4.92	49

==== Other pitchers ====
Note: G = Games pitched; IP = Innings pitched; W = Wins; L = Losses; ERA = Earned run average; SO = Strikeouts

Player	G	IP	W	L	ERA	SO
Roy Sherid	33	154.2	6	6	3.61	51
Fred Heimach	35	134.2	11	6	4.01	26
Tom Zachary	26	119.2	12	0	2.48	35
Hank Johnson	12	42.2	3	3	5.06	24
Gordon Rhodes	10	42.2	0	4	4.85	13
Myles Thomas	5	15.0	0	2	10.80	3

==== Relief pitchers ====
Note: G = Games pitched; W = Wins; L = Losses; SV = Saves; ERA = Earned run average; SO = Strikeouts

Player	G	W	L	SV	ERA	SO
Wilcy Moore	41	6	4	9	4.13	21
Bots Nekola	9	0	0	0	4.34	2

== Awards and honors ==
=== League top ten finishers ===
Lou Gehrig

- #2 in AL in home runs (35)
- #2 in AL in on-base percentage (.431)
- #3 in AL in runs scored (127)
- #3 in AL in walks (122)
- #4 in AL in RBI (126)
- #4 in AL in slugging percentage (.584)

Tony Lazzeri

- #4 in AL in on-base percentage (.429)

George Pipgras

- #3 in AL in strikeouts (125)

Babe Ruth

- MLB leader in home runs (46)
- MLB leader in slugging percentage (.697)
- #2 in AL in RBI (154)
- #3 in AL in on-base percentage (.430)

== Farm system ==
Level	Team	League	Manager
D	Chambersburg Young Yanks	Blue Ridge League	Tommy Clarke
