= Lena Blackburne =

American baseball player, coach, and manager (1886–1968)

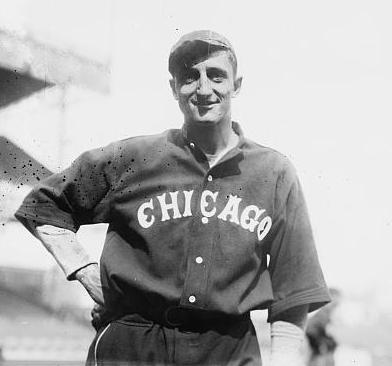
- Infielder / Coach / Manager
- Born: October 23, 1886; Clifton Heights, Pennsylvania, U.S.
- Died: February 29, 1968 (aged 81); Riverside Township, New Jersey, U.S.
- Batted: Right Threw: Right

MLB debut
- April 14, 1910, for the Chicago White Sox

Last MLB appearance
- June 5, 1929, for the Chicago White Sox

MLB statistics
- Batting average: .214
- Home runs: 4
- Runs batted in: 139
- Games managed: 232
- Managerial record: 99–133
- Winning %: .427
- Stats at Baseball Reference

Teams
- As player: Chicago White Sox (1910, 1912, 1914–1915); Cincinnati Reds (1918); Boston Braves (1919); Philadelphia Phillies (1919); Chicago White Sox (1927, 1929); As coach: Chicago White Sox (1927); St. Louis Browns (1930); Philadelphia Athletics (1933–1938, 1940, 1942–1943; As manager: Chicago White Sox (1928–1929)

Russell Aubrey "Lena" Blackburne (October 23, 1886 – February 29, 1968) was an American baseball infielder, manager, coach, and scout in Major League Baseball (MLB). He is best known for the creation of his baseball rubbing mud, used to remove the finish on new baseballs and give better grip and control to the pitcher.

== Career ==
Between 1910 and 1929, Blackburne played for the Chicago White Sox (1910, 1912, 1914–1915, 1927, 1929), Cincinnati Reds (1918), Boston Braves (1919) and Philadelphia Phillies (1919). He batted and threw right-handed. Following his playing career, Blackburne managed the White Sox (1928–29) and coached for the White Sox (1927–28), St. Louis Browns (1930) and Philadelphia Athletics (1933–38; 1940–45; 1947–48).

Blackburne was a native of Clifton Heights, Pennsylvania, and moved to Palmyra, New Jersey with his family at a very young age. While living in Palmyra, as a youth, Blackburne played football for the Palmyra Field Club in 1906.

Blackburne broke into the majors with the White Sox in 1910, appearing in part of five seasons, and split the 1919 season with the Braves and Phillies. In an eight-season playing career, Blackburne was a .214 hitter with four home runs and 139 runs batted in in 550 games played. As a fielder, he appeared in 539 games at shortstop (213), third base (180) and second (144) and first (2), and also relieved in one game.

In 1933, he went on to become a coach with the Philadelphia Athletics of Connie Mack. Blackburne stayed with the Athletics as a scout when the club moved to Kansas City. As a manager in the major leagues, he posted a 99–133 record for a .427 winning percentage. He managed the Toronto Maple Leafs of the International League for parts of three seasons: 1916, 1921, and 1932. In each case he was hired as a mid-season replacement.

Blackburne died in Riverside Township, New Jersey at age 81, and is buried in Morgan Cemetery on the outskirts of Palmyra, not far from where he lived on Henry and Cinnaminson Avenues.

=== Managerial record ===
Team	Year	Regular season					Postseason			
Team	Year	Games	Won	Lost	Win %	Finish	Won	Lost	Win %	Result
CWS	1928	80	40	40	.500	5th in AL	–	–	–	–
CWS	1929	152	59	93	.388	7th in AL	–	–	–	–
Total		232	99	133	.427		0	0	–	

== See also ==
- Chicago White Sox all-time roster
- List of Major League Baseball player–managers
