= George Blackerby =

American baseball player (1903–1987)

- Left fielder
- Born: November 18, 1903; Luther, Oklahoma, U.S.
- Died: March 30, 1987 (aged 83); Wichita Falls, Texas, U.S.
- Batted: Right Threw: Right

MLB debut
- August 10, 1928, for the Chicago White Sox

Last MLB appearance
- September 29, 1928, for the Chicago White Sox

MLB statistics
- Batting average: .253
- Home runs: 0
- Runs batted in: 12
- Stats at Baseball Reference

Teams
- Chicago White Sox (1928)

George Franklin Blackerby (November 18, 1903 – March 30, 1987) was an American professional baseball player. He was an outfielder for one season (1928) with the Chicago White Sox. For his career, he compiled a .253 batting average in 83 at-bats, with 12 runs batted in.

He was born in Luther, Oklahoma and died in Wichita Falls, Texas at the age of 83.
