= 1929 Cleveland Indians season =

1929 Cleveland Indians
- League: American League
- Ballpark: League Park
- City: Cleveland, Ohio
- Owners: Alva Bradley
- General managers: Billy Evans
- Managers: Roger Peckinpaugh
- Radio: WTAM (Tom Manning)

The 1929 Cleveland Indians season was a season in American baseball. The team finished third in the American League with a record of 81–71, 24 games behind the Philadelphia Athletics.

== Offseason ==
- January 5, 1929: Homer Summa was purchased from the Indians by the Philadelphia Athletics.

== Regular season ==
=== Season standings ===
American League
Team	W	L	Pct.	GB	Home	Road
Philadelphia Athletics	104	46	.693	—	57‍–‍16	47‍–‍30
New York Yankees	88	66	.571	18	49‍–‍28	39‍–‍38
Cleveland Indians	81	71	.533	24	44‍–‍32	37‍–‍39
St. Louis Browns	79	73	.520	26	41‍–‍36	38‍–‍37
Washington Senators	71	81	.467	34	37‍–‍40	34‍–‍41
Detroit Tigers	70	84	.455	36	38‍–‍39	32‍–‍45
Chicago White Sox	59	93	.388	46	35‍–‍41	24‍–‍52
Boston Red Sox	58	96	.377	48	32‍–‍45	26‍–‍51

=== Record vs. opponents ===
1929 American League record Sources:
Team	BOS	CWS	CLE	DET	NYY	PHA	SLB	WSH
Boston	—	11–11	9–13	8–14	5–17	4–18	11–11–1	10–12
Chicago	11–11	—	9–12	10–12	6–16	9–13	4–17	10–12
Cleveland	13–9	12–9	—	11–11	14–8	7–14	10–12	14–8
Detroit	14–8	12–10	11–11	—	9–13	4–18	10–12	10–12–1
New York	17–5	16–6	8–14	13–9	—	8–14	14–8	12–10
Philadelphia	18–4	13–9	14–7	18–4	14–8	—	11–10–1	16–4
St. Louis	11–11–1	17–4	12–10	12–10	8–14	10–11–1	—	9–13
Washington	12–10	12–10	8–14	12–10–1	10–12	4–16	13–9	—

=== Roster ===
1929 Cleveland Indians
Roster
Pitchers: -- Clint Brown; 22 Wes Ferrell; -- George Grant; 49 Mel Harder; 17 Ken Holloway; 15 Willis Hudlin; 18 Johnny Miljus; 14 Jake Miller; -- Jim Moore; 12 Joe Shaute; 23 Milt Shoffner; 21 Jimmy Zinn	Catchers: 11 Grover Hartley; 9 Glenn Myatt; 8 Luke Sewell; Infielders: -- Johnny Burnett; 6 Lew Fonseca; 34 Ray Gardner; 57 Joe Hauser; 71 Johnny Hodapp; 2 Carl Lind; 4 Joe Sewell; 1 Jackie Tavener	Outfielders: 5 Earl Averill; 51 Bibb Falk; 7 Charlie Jamieson; 61 Ed Morgan; 3 Dick Porter; Other batters: -- Dan Jessee	Manager: Roger Peckinpaugh; Coaches: 11 Grover Hartley; 10 Howie Shanks

== Player stats ==
= Indicates team leader

= Indicates league leader

=== Batting ===
==== Starters by position ====
Note: Pos = Position; G = Games played; AB = At bats; H = Hits; Avg. = Batting average; HR = Home runs; RBI = Runs batted in

Pos	Player	G	AB	H	Avg.	HR	RBI
C	Luke Sewell	124	406	96	.236	1	39
1B	Lew Fonseca	148	566	209	.369	6	103
2B	Johnny Hodapp	90	294	96	.327	4	51
SS	Ray Gardner	82	256	67	.262	1	24
3B	Joe Sewell	152	578	182	.315	7	73
OF	Charlie Jamieson	102	364	106	.291	0	26
OF	Earl Averill	152	597	198	.332	18	96
OF	Bibb Falk	125	426	133	.312	13	93

==== Other batters ====
Note: G = Games played; AB = At bats; H = Hits; Avg. = Batting average; HR = Home runs; RBI = Runs batted in

Player	G	AB	H	Avg.	HR	RBI
Ed Morgan	93	318	101	.318	3	37
Jackie Tavener	92	250	53	.212	2	27
Carl Lind	66	225	54	.240	0	13
Dick Porter	71	192	63	.328	1	24
Glenn Myatt	59	129	30	.233	1	17
Joe Hauser	37	48	12	.250	3	9
Johnny Burnett	19	33	5	.152	0	2
Grover Hartley	24	33	9	.273	0	8
Dan Jessee	1	0	0	----	0	0

=== Pitching ===
==== Starting pitchers ====
Note: G = Games pitched; IP = Innings pitched; W = Wins; L = Losses; ERA = Earned run average; SO = Strikeouts

Player	G	IP	W	L	ERA	SO
Willis Hudlin	40	280.1	17	15	3.34	60
Jake Miller	29	206.0	14	12	3.58	58
Joe Shaute	26	162.0	8	8	4.28	43

==== Other pitchers ====
Note: G = Games pitched; IP = Innings pitched; W = Wins; L = Losses; ERA = Earned run average; SO = Strikeouts

Player	G	IP	W	L	ERA	SO
Wes Ferrell	43	242.2	21	10	3.60	100
Johnny Miljus	34	128.1	8	8	5.19	42
Ken Holloway	25	119.0	6	5	3.03	32
Jimmy Zinn	18	105.1	4	6	5.04	29
Milt Shoffner	11	44.2	2	3	5.04	15
Clint Brown	3	16.1	0	2	3.31	1

==== Relief pitchers ====
Note: G = Games pitched; W = Wins; L = Losses; SV = Saves; ERA = Earned run average; SO = Strikeouts

Player	G	W	L	SV	ERA	SO
George Grant	12	0	2	0	10.50	5
Jim Moore	2	0	0	0	9.53	0

== Farm system ==
Level	Team	League	Manager
B	Terre Haute Tots	Illinois–Indiana–Iowa League	Earl Wolgamot
D	Frederick Warriors	Blue Ridge League	Bob Wells
