= 1929 World Series =

1929 Major League Baseball championship series

Team (Wins)	Managers	Season
Philadelphia Athletics (4)	Connie Mack	104–46, .693, GA: 18
Chicago Cubs (1)	Joe McCarthy	98–54, .645, GA: 10 1/2
- Dates: October 8–14
- Venue(s): Wrigley Field (Chicago); Shibe Park (Philadelphia)
- Umpires: Bill Klem (NL), Bill Dinneen (AL), Charley Moran (NL), Roy Van Graflan (AL)
- Hall of Famers: Umpire: Bill Klem; Athletics: Connie Mack (manager); Mickey Cochrane; Jimmie Foxx; Lefty Grove; Eddie Collins; Al Simmons; Cubs: Joe McCarthy (manager); Kiki Cuyler; Gabby Hartnett; Rogers Hornsby; Hack Wilson

Broadcast
- Radio: NBC; CBS
- Radio announcers: NBC: Graham McNamee; CBS: Ted Husing

The 1929 World Series was the championship series of Major League Baseball for the 1929 season. The 26th edition of the World Series, it was a best-of-seven playoff that pitted the American League (AL) champion Philadelphia Athletics against the National League (NL) champion Chicago Cubs. The Athletics defeated the Cubs in five games to win the Series.

== Summary ==
AL Philadelphia Athletics (4) vs. NL Chicago Cubs (1)

Game	Date	Score	Location	Time	Attendance
1	October 8	Philadelphia Athletics – 3, Chicago Cubs – 1	Wrigley Field	2:03	50,740
2	October 9	Philadelphia Athletics – 9, Chicago Cubs – 3	Wrigley Field	2:29	49,987
3	October 11	Chicago Cubs – 3, Philadelphia Athletics – 1	Shibe Park	2:09	29,921
4	October 12	Chicago Cubs – 8, Philadelphia Athletics – 10	Shibe Park	2:12	29,921
5	October 14	Chicago Cubs – 2, Philadelphia Athletics – 3	Shibe Park	1:42	29,921

== Matchups ==
=== Game 1 ===
October 8, 1929 1:30 pm (CT) at Wrigley Field in Chicago, Illinois
Team	1	2	3	4	5	6	7	8	9	R	H	E
Philadelphia	0	0	0	0	0	0	1	0	2	3	6	1
Chicago	0	0	0	0	0	0	0	0	1	1	8	2
WP: Howard Ehmke (1–0) LP: Charlie Root (0–1); Home runs: PHA: Jimmie Foxx (1); CHC: None

This was the first World Series game ever played at Wrigley Field.

Because seven of the eight regulars in the Cubs' lineup hit right-handed, Athletics manager Connie Mack started only right-handed pitchers during the series and kept all his left-handed pitchers in the bullpen, even though two of his best starters, Lefty Grove and Rube Walberg, were left-handed.

The Athletics' Howard Ehmke, who started his major league career in 1915, had been a good starting pitcher, but by 1929, he was suffering from a sore arm. Pitching only occasionally, he finished the regular season with a 7–2 record, a 3.29 earned run average, and 20 strikeouts in 54.2 innings. Meanwhile, the Athletics had a big lead in the AL standings. In August, Mack told Ehmke that he was going to be released after the season. Ehmke accepted the decision but said that he would like to pitch in a World Series game, having never done so before. In mid-September, with both league pennant races wrapped up, Mack had Ehmke leave the team and go on the road to scout the NL champion Cubs for the last few weeks of the season, telling him to be prepared to start game 1 of the World Series.

Mack kept the pitching decision a secret until the day of the game. The Athletics had plenty of good pitchers available, and players on both teams were surprised that Ehmke was starting. However, with his knowledge of the Cubs' batters and a rested arm, Ehmke pitched a complete game, winning 3–1 with no earned runs allowed and 13 strikeouts. The strikeout total broke the World Series record that had been set by Ed Walsh in 1906; Ehmke's record then stood until it was broken by Carl Erskine in 1953. This ended up being the last win of Ehmke's career and also became one of the most famous games in baseball history.

Attending the game was nine-year-old John Paul Stevens, who would grow up to become a Supreme Court Justice. A lifelong Cubs fan, Stevens later said, "And that was my first game, a tragic game for a young boy to go and see in person!"

=== Game 2 ===
October 9, 1929 1:30 pm (CT) at Wrigley Field in Chicago, Illinois
Team	1	2	3	4	5	6	7	8	9	R	H	E
Philadelphia	0	0	3	3	0	0	1	2	0	9	12	0
Chicago	0	0	0	0	3	0	0	0	0	3	11	1
WP: George Earnshaw (1–0) LP: Pat Malone (0–1) Sv: Lefty Grove (1); Home runs: PHA: Jimmie Foxx (2), Al Simmons (1); CHC: None

Behind the pitching of George Earnshaw and Grove, the Athletics won 9–3 and took a 2–0 lead in the series. Jimmie Foxx became the first player to homer in his first two World Series games. Al Simmons also homered and had four runs batted in.

=== Game 3 ===
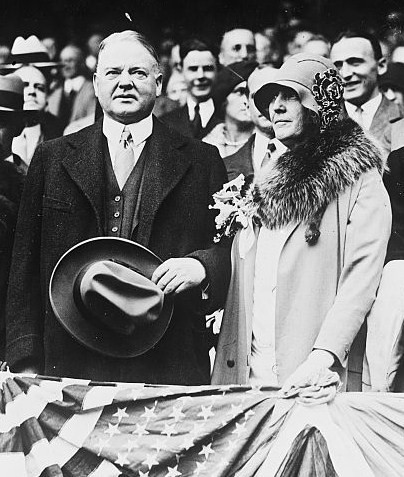
President Herbert Hoover attends a game at Shibe Park

October 11, 1929 1:30 pm (ET) at Shibe Park in Philadelphia, Pennsylvania
Team	1	2	3	4	5	6	7	8	9	R	H	E
Chicago	0	0	0	0	0	3	0	0	0	3	6	1
Philadelphia	0	0	0	0	1	0	0	0	0	1	9	1
WP: Guy Bush (1–0) LP: George Earnshaw (1–1)

Game 3 was a pitchers' duel that featured many tense moments. Guy Bush won this game for the Cubs' only victory, holding the Athletics to one run despite allowing nine hits and two walks. Earnshaw started his second straight game for the Athletics and allowed only one earned run himself.

=== Game 4 ===
October 12, 1929 1:30 pm (ET) at Shibe Park in Philadelphia, Pennsylvania
Team	1	2	3	4	5	6	7	8	9	R	H	E
Chicago	0	0	0	2	0	5	1	0	0	8	10	2
Philadelphia	0	0	0	0	0	0	10	0	X	10	15	2
WP: Eddie Rommel (1–0) LP: Sheriff Blake (0–1) Sv: Lefty Grove (2); Home runs: CHC: Charlie Grimm (1); PHA: Al Simmons (2), Mule Haas (1)

Sticking to his right-handed-pitchers-only policy, Mack again made a risky move in Game 4 by starting 46-year-old Jack Quinn. Unlike Ehmke, however, Quinn was no challenge to the Cubs' hitters, who scored seven runs off him before Mack pulled him in the sixth inning.

Trailing 8–0, the Athletics then scored 10 runs in the bottom of the seventh inning and won the game. In the middle of the rally that became known as the "Mack Attack", Cubs center fielder Hack Wilson lost Mule Haas's fly ball in the sun, and Haas circled the bases for a three-run inside-the-park home run, bringing the Athletics to within a run at 8–7. This was the last inside-the-park home run in a World Series game until Game 1 of the 2015 World Series. The eight-run deficit overcome by the Athletics is still the largest in postseason history.

Art Nehf's relief pitching appearance in this game was his last in the major leagues.

=== Game 5 ===
October 14, 1929 1:30 pm (ET) at Shibe Park in Philadelphia, Pennsylvania
Team	1	2	3	4	5	6	7	8	9	R	H	E
Chicago	0	0	0	2	0	0	0	0	0	2	8	1
Philadelphia	0	0	0	0	0	0	0	0	3	3	6	0
WP: Rube Walberg (1–0) LP: Pat Malone (0–2); Home runs: CHC: None; PHA: Mule Haas (2)

Mack gave Ehmke his second start of the Series, but without the advantage of surprise, he was less effective, touched for two runs, and taken out in the fourth inning. The Athletics trailed 2–0 going into the bottom of the ninth. However, Haas tied the game up with a two-run homer. Then, after a double by Simmons and an intentional walk to Foxx, Bing Miller's double scored Simmons to give the Athletics their first World Series championship in 16 years.

== Composite line score ==
1929 World Series (4–1): Philadelphia Athletics (A.L.) over Chicago Cubs (N.L.)

Team	1	2	3	4	5	6	7	8	9	R	H	E
Philadelphia Athletics	0	0	3	3	1	0	12	2	5	26	48	4
Chicago Cubs	0	0	0	4	3	8	1	0	1	17	43	7
Total attendance: 190,490 Average attendance: 38,098; Winning player's share: $5,621 Losing player's share: $3,782
