= Lefty Grove =

American baseball player (1900–1975)

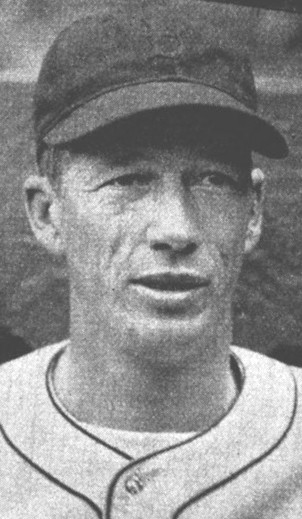
- Grove in 1939
- Pitcher
- Born: March 6, 1900; Lonaconing, Maryland, U.S.
- Died: May 22, 1975 (aged 75); Norwalk, Ohio, U.S.
- Batted: Left Threw: Left

MLB debut
- April 14, 1925, for the Philadelphia Athletics

Last MLB appearance
- September 28, 1941, for the Boston Red Sox

MLB statistics
- Win–loss record: 300–141
- Earned run average: 3.06
- Strikeouts: 2,266
- Stats at Baseball Reference

Teams
- Philadelphia Athletics (1925–1933); Boston Red Sox (1934–1941)

Career highlights and awards
- 6× All-Star (1933, 1935–1939); 2× World Series champion (1929, 1930); AL MVP (1931); 2× Triple Crown (1930, 1931); 4× AL wins leader (1928, 1930, 1931, 1933); 9× AL ERA leader (1926, 1929–1932, 1935, 1936, 1938, 1939); 7× AL strikeout leader (1925–1931); Philadelphia Baseball Wall of Fame; Athletics Hall of Fame; Boston Red Sox Hall of Fame; Major League Baseball All-Century Team

Member of the National

Baseball Hall of Fame
- Induction: 1947
- Vote: 76.4% (fourth ballot)

Robert Moses "Lefty" Grove (March 6, 1900 – May 22, 1975) was an American professional baseball pitcher. After having success in the minor leagues during the early 1920s, Grove became a star in Major League Baseball (MLB) with the American League's Philadelphia Athletics and Boston Red Sox. One of the greatest pitchers in history, Grove led the American League in wins in four separate seasons, in strikeouts seven consecutive seasons, and had the league's lowest earned run average a record nine times. Over the course of the three years from 1929 to 1931, he twice won the pitcher's Triple Crown, leading the league in wins, strikeouts, and ERA, while amassing a 79–15 record and leading the Athletics to three straight AL championships. Overall, Grove won 300 games in his 17-year MLB career. He was elected to the National Baseball Hall of Fame in 1947.

== Early life ==
Grove was born in Lonaconing, Maryland, one of eight children of John Robert Grove (1865–1957) and Emma Catherine Beeman (1872–1959). His father and brothers mined coal.

Grove was a sandlot star in the Baltimore area during the 1910s. He did not play organized baseball until he was 19 years old. Grove purportedly gained the ability to throw hard by hurling rocks. In 1920, he made his professional debut with the Martinsburg Mountaineers of the class-D Blue Ridge League, where he appeared in six games. In 59 innings pitched, Grove gave up just 30 hits, and he had an earned run average (ERA) of 1.68. His performance attracted the attention of Jack Dunn, Sr. (1872–1928), the manager/owner of the minor league Baltimore Orioles, who also discovered Babe Ruth. Dunn acquired Grove's services by giving Martinsburg enough cash to replace their center field wall.

== Baltimore Orioles (minor league) ==
Grove joined the Baltimore Orioles in 1920, while they were playing a half-century in the minor leagues of first the old Eastern League (1903–1914) and then after 1916, in the reorganized International League of AAA ball. Grove broke into the team's pitching rotation at midseason and had a 12–2 record the rest of the way. The Orioles were in the middle of winning six straight IL titles from 1919 to 1925. Over the next four seasons, Grove posted marks of 25–10, 18–8, 27–10 and 26–6, leading the International League in strikeouts each season.

Grove remained in the minor leagues through 1924, as owner Jack Dunn refused several offers from the majors to acquire him. At the time, the Orioles were an independent operation with no major league affiliation and the International League had declared its players not subject to a major league draft. Since the reserve clause in all contracts was honored throughout organized baseball, this meant that Grove had no way to reach the majors until the Orioles became willing to trade or sell his contract. Knowing he had such a talented pitcher in Grove, Dunn kept his contract until 1925, when he finally agreed to sell Grove's rights to Connie Mack (1862–1956) and his Philadelphia Athletics in the American League for $100,600 (equivalent to $1.85 million in 2025), the highest amount ever paid for a player at the time.

== Philadelphia Athletics ==
Grove battled injuries as a major league rookie and posted a 10–12 mark (which would prove his only losing record in 17 major league seasons). He led the league in strikeouts but posted a high 4.75 ERA. Grove then settled down in 1926 and won the first of a record nine earned run average (ERA) titles with a mark of 2.51. In 1927, Grove won 20 games for the first time, and a year later he tied George Pipgras for the AL lead in wins with 24.

The Athletics won the AL pennant in three consecutive seasons (1929 to 1931), as well as consecutive World Series championships in 1929 and 1930. During the Athletics' championship run, Grove led the way as the league's top pitcher, posting records of 20–6, 28–5 and 31–4. In 1931, Grove led the league in wins, ERA (2.06), strikeouts (175), winning percentage, complete games, and shutouts. His 2.06 ERA was 2.32 runs below the league average. He was also chosen as league MVP in 1931, making him one of only a handful of pitchers to achieve this honor. His MVP award is the only one not enshrined in the National Baseball Hall of Fame in Cooperstown, New York, instead being housed at the George's Creek Library in Lonaconing, Maryland.

During the 1931 season, Grove tied Smokey Joe Wood's and Walter Johnson's AL record with 16 straight wins. He was attempting to win his 17th straight decision when a rookie outfielder filling in for Al Simmons, who had the day off, committed an error that led to the only run of the game. Grove stated, "After that game I went in and tore the clubhouse up. Wrecked the place. Tore those stall lockers off the wall, giving Al Simmons hell all the while." He followed the loss with eight straight wins. He led the league in strikeouts for a record seven straight years to start his major league career.

The Athletics contended for the next two seasons, but finished second to the New York Yankees in 1932 and third behind the Washington Senators and Yankees in 1933. In 1933, Grove became the first player in Major League Baseball history to strike out five times in a nine-inning game. On December 12, 1933, team owner Connie Mack traded Grove, along with Max Bishop and Rube Walberg, to the Boston Red Sox for Bob Kline, Rabbit Warstler and $125,000.

== Boston Red Sox ==
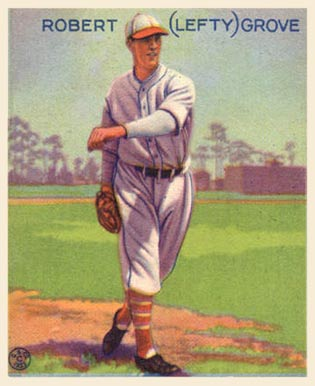
A 1933 Goudey baseball card of Grove

Grove was unable to contribute substantially during his first year in Boston, an arm injury holding him to an 8–8 record. In 1935, however, Grove returned to form with a 20–12 record and a league-leading 2.70 ERA. In the 1936 season, he had a 2.81 ERA (winning his seventh ERA title) while recording a 17–12 record and 130 strikeouts. Grove won his eighth ERA title a year later, while having a 17–9 record along with 153 strikeouts. He pitched 262 innings for the season; this was his 11th and final season where he pitched over 200 innings. Grove continued to post outstanding records, including 14–4 in 1938 and 15–4 in 1939, as well as leading the AL in ERA four times between 1935 and 1939. He had a 7–6 record in 1940 while recording a 3.99 ERA with 62 strikeouts in 153.1 innings. In Grove's last season, he won and lost seven games, winning his 300th game on July 25 (giving up six runs on 12 hits, but winning 10–6), before losing his last three major league games, ending his career on September 28, pitching just one inning in the second game of a doubleheader.

== Personal life ==
Grove married his childhood sweetheart, Ethel Gardner, in 1921. They had two children, Robert and Doris. The couple would later divorce after Grove had an affair with another woman.

Grove was elected to the town council in his native Lonaconing in the 1950s and also served as the town's police chief. During offseasons and after retiring, Grove operated a bowling alley in Lonaconing. Grove befriended a sandlot baseball team whose games he passed on the way home from MLB games, purchasing new jerseys and equipment for the team. He often donated equipment to local youth baseball players in his retirement.

== Legacy ==
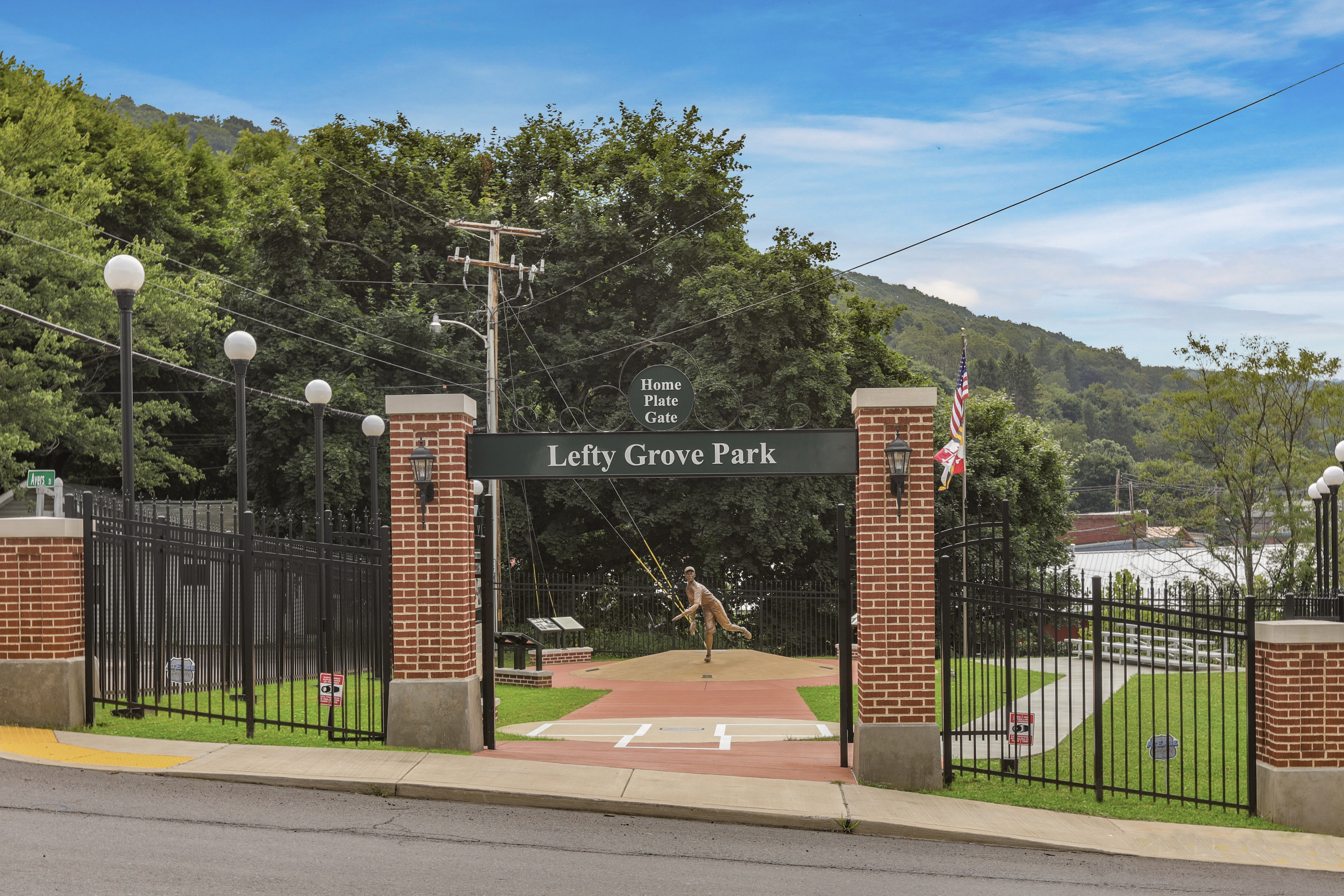
Lefty Grove Memorial from Main Street

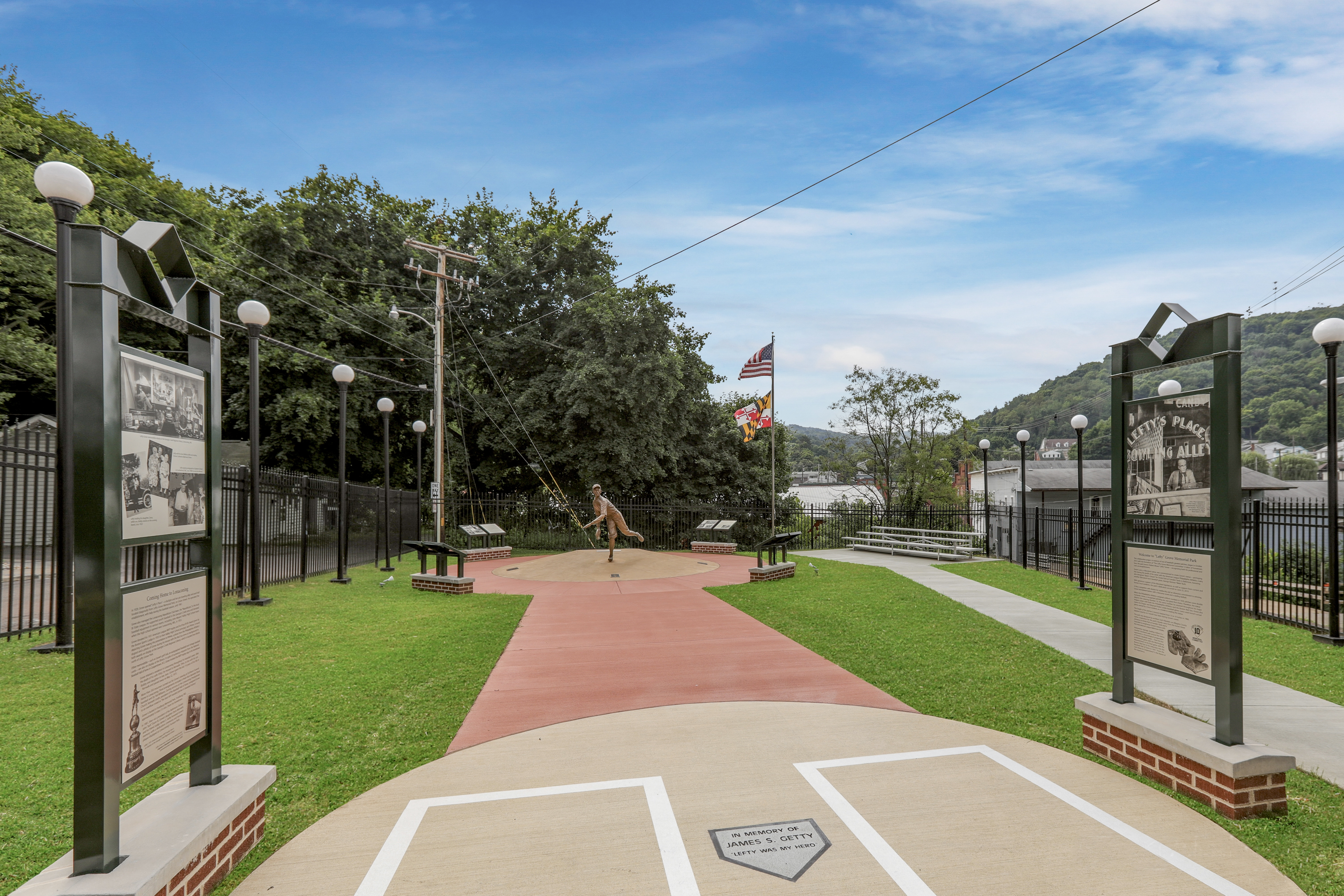
Lefty Grove Memorial looking from home plate

Grove retired in 1941 with a career record of 300–141. His .680 lifetime winning percentage is eighth all-time; however, none of the seven men ahead of him won more than 236 games. His lifetime ERA of 3.06, when normalized to overall league ERA and adjusted for the parks in which Grove played during his career, is fifth all-time among pitchers with at least 1,000 innings pitched (behind Mariano Rivera, Clayton Kershaw, Jim Devlin, and Pedro Martínez) at 48 percent better than average.

As a hitter, Grove posted a .148 batting average (202-for-1,369) with 119 runs, 15 home runs, 121 RBI and 105 bases on balls. From 1929 through 1932, Grove had 56 RBI. Defensively, he recorded a .954 fielding percentage.

Grove was elected to the National Baseball Hall of Fame in 1947. He died in Norwalk, Ohio, of a heart attack while watching a televised baseball game at his daughter-in-law's home on May 22, 1975. Grove was interred in Section 9, Lot 94, of the Frostburg Memorial Park Cemetery in Frostburg, Maryland.

In 1969, Grove was voted the left-handed starting pitcher for Major League Baseball's 100th anniversary team. In 1999, Grove was ranked number 23 on The Sporting News list of Baseball's Greatest Players. He ranked second, behind only Warren Spahn, among left-handed pitchers. That year, he was elected to the Major League Baseball All-Century Team. In the 2001 book The New Bill James Historical Baseball Abstract, Bill James ranked Grove as the 19th best baseball player of all time and the second-best MLB pitcher of all time. According to baseball historian Frank Russo, Grove is usually thought to be the best left-handed pitcher in the history of the American League. Russo also writes, "Normalized for league average and adjusted for home park, his 3.06 ERA is quite simply the best in baseball history."

At Game #4 of the 1972 World Series in Oakland, Grove threw out the ceremonial first pitch.

=== Memorial Park ===
The objective of the Lefty Grove Memorial Committee is to preserve the memory of Grove. The Lefty Grove Memorial committee is based in Grove's hometown of Lonaconing, Maryland. The memorial was completed and opened to the public on June 22, 2019.

== See also ==
- List of Major League Baseball career wins leaders
- List of Major League Baseball career strikeout leaders
- List of Major League Baseball annual wins leaders
- List of Major League Baseball annual ERA leaders
- List of Major League Baseball annual strikeout leaders
- List of Major League Baseball annual shutout leaders
- List of Major League Baseball annual saves leaders
- List of Major League Baseball all-time leaders in home runs by pitchers
- List of Major League Baseball pitchers who have thrown an immaculate inning
- Major League Baseball titles leaders

Preceded by Walter Johnson	American League Pitching Triple Crown; 1930 and 1931	Succeeded by Lefty Gomez
