= Johnny Mann (baseball) =

American baseball player (1898–1977)

- Pinch hitter / Third baseman
- Born: February 4, 1898; Fontanet, Indiana, U.S.
- Died: March 31, 1977 (aged 79); Terre Haute, Indiana, U.S.
- Batted: Right Threw: Right

MLB debut
- April 18, 1928, for the Chicago White Sox

Last MLB appearance
- May 23, 1928, for the Chicago White Sox

MLB statistics
- Games played: 6
- At bats: 6
- Hits: 3
- Stats at Baseball Reference

Teams
- Chicago White Sox (1928)

John Leo Mann (February 4, 1898 – March 31, 1977) was an American Major League Baseball player who played for the Chicago White Sox in 1928. He was used as a pinch hitter and a third baseman.
