= Willie Kamm =

American baseball player (1900–1988)

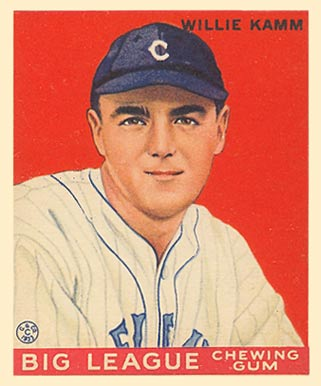
- Third baseman
- Born: February 2, 1900; San Francisco, California, U.S.
- Died: December 21, 1988 (aged 88); Belmont, California, U.S.
- Batted: Right Threw: Right

MLB debut
- April 18, 1923, for the Chicago White Sox

Last MLB appearance
- May 21, 1935, for the Cleveland Indians

MLB statistics
- Batting average: .281
- Home runs: 29
- Runs batted in: 827
- Stats at Baseball Reference

Teams
- Chicago White Sox (1923–1931); Cleveland Indians (1931–1935)

William Edward Kamm (February 2, 1900 – December 21, 1988) was an American professional baseball player. He played as a third baseman in Major League Baseball from 1923 to 1935. Kamm played most of his career for the Chicago White Sox before finishing his playing days with the Cleveland Indians. He was the dominant defensive third baseman in the American League for most of his career.

== Major league career ==
Born in San Francisco, California, Kamm was the first player in major league baseball history to be contracted from the minor leagues for $100,000. He made his major league debut at the age of 23 with the Chicago White Sox in 1923, hitting 39 doubles with 89 runs batted in. He increased his runs batted in total to 93 in 1924, and led American League third basemen in putouts, assists and fielding percentage.

Kamm had his best season offensively in 1928 when he posted a .308 batting average along with 84 runs batted in. He finished fifth in the 1928 American League Most Valuable Player Award voting, despite the fact that the White Sox finished the year in fifth place. He was traded to the Cleveland Indians in the middle of the 1931 season, where he continued to perform well in the field. In 1933, Kamm set a single-season record for third basemen with a .984 fielding percentage, which stood for fourteen years until it was surpassed by Hank Majeski in 1947. He retired as a player after the 1935 season.

Kamm was considered a master of the hidden ball trick. On April 30, 1929, in a game against the Cleveland Indians, Kamm was involved in a rare triple play that involved a hidden ball trick. The Indians had baserunners on second and third bases when Carl Lind grounded out to the shortstop, who then threw to first base to retire the batter. Johnny Hodapp, who had been the baserunner on second base, erroneously thought the runner on third base, Charlie Jamieson had scored, so he advanced to third base on the ground out. Kamm retrieved the ball from the first baseman and tagged both runners at third base, whereupon the umpire ruled Hodapp out. Kamm then hid the ball under his arm and waited for Jamieson to step off the base. When he did so, Kamm tagged him out to complete the triple play.

== Career statistics ==
In a thirteen-year major league career, Kamm played in 1,693 games, accumulating 1,643 hits in 5,851 at bats for a .281 career batting average along with 29 home runs and 827 runs batted in. At the time of his retirement, only Heinie Groh had a higher career fielding percentage among retired major league third basemen, and as of 2010, his .967 career fielding percentage is the 15th highest by a third baseman in major league baseball history. Kamm led the league in fielding average eight times, including six times in a row, and in putouts seven times. Kamm still holds the American League single-season record for putouts by a third baseman with 243 set in 1928, and ranks eighth overall in putouts by third basemen. He also led American League third basemen four times in assists and twice in range factor.

Kamm is one of only 18 players in major league baseball history to have more than 60 runs batted in during a season, without hitting a home run. He is the only player to have ever accomplished the feat twice, with 62 runs batted in during the 1926 season, and 75 runs batted in during the 1931 season.

Sabermetrician Bill James, in his baseball reference book The New Bill James Historical Baseball Abstract, noted that after trading Willie Kamm, the Chicago White Sox did not stabilize the third base position until 1989—a period of 58 years.

== Career as manager ==
After his retirement as a player, Kamm became the manager of the Mission Reds in the Pacific Coast League from 1936 to 1937.

Kamm died at age 88 in Belmont, California.
