= Rudy Leopold =

American baseball player (1905–1965)

- Pitcher
- Born: July 27, 1905; Grand Cane, Louisiana, U.S.
- Died: September 3, 1965 (aged 60); Baton Rouge, Louisiana, U.S.
- Batted: Left Threw: Left

MLB debut
- July 4, 1928, for the Chicago White Sox

Last MLB appearance
- July 25, 1928, for the Chicago White Sox

MLB statistics
- Games pitched: 2
- Earned run average: 3.86
- Strikeouts: 0
- Stats at Baseball Reference

Teams
- Chicago White Sox (1928)

Rudolph Matas Leopold (July 27, 1905 – September 3, 1965) was an American Major League Baseball (MLB) pitcher who played for the Chicago White Sox in 1928.
