= Bill Breckinridge =

American baseball player (1907–1958)

- Pitcher
- Born: October 16, 1907; Tulsa, Oklahoma
- Died: August 23, 1958 (aged 50); Tulsa, Oklahoma
- Batted: Right Threw: Right

MLB debut
- Jun 30, 1929, for the Philadelphia Athletics

Last MLB appearance
- September 21, 1929, for the Philadelphia Athletics

MLB statistics
- Win–loss record: 0-0
- Earned run average: 8.10
- Strikeouts: 2
- Stats at Baseball Reference

Teams
- Philadelphia Athletics (1929)

William Robertson Breckinridge (October 16, 1907 – August 23, 1958) was a pitcher in Major League Baseball. He played three games for the Philadelphia Athletics in 1929. He later practiced law in Tulsa, Oklahoma.

== Personal life ==
Breckinridge was the son-in-law of oil entrepreneur Waite Phillips, marrying his daughter Helen Jane Phillips on December 22, 1932, in Benton, Arkansas. The couple had two sons, Phillips and Peyton Anthony.

Both his sons also became attorneys. His son Phillips worked as a federal prosecutor before his election as a Tulsa County judge in 1968. His son Peyton was elected an Oklahoma legislator in 1968, serving the 38th house district in the 32nd Oklahoma Legislature, and then 8 years as a state senator. His grandson, Phillips' son Flint, served the 78th house district in the 43rd and 44th Oklahoma legislatures.
