= Roy Wilson (baseball) =

American baseball player (1896–1969)

- Pitcher
- Born: September 13, 1896; Foster, Iowa
- Died: December 3, 1969 (aged 73); Clarion, Iowa
- Batted: Left Threw: Left

MLB debut
- April 18, 1928, for the Chicago White Sox

Last MLB appearance
- April 18, 1928, for the Chicago White Sox

MLB statistics
- Win–loss record: 0-0
- Strikeouts: 2
- Earned run average: 0.00
- Stats at Baseball Reference

Teams
- Chicago White Sox (1928)

Roy Edward "Lefty" Wilson (September 13, 1896 – December 3, 1969) was a professional baseball pitcher. He appeared in one game in Major League Baseball for the Chicago White Sox during the 1928 season. Wilson batted and threw left-handed.

In his lone major league appearance, Wilson pitched 3.1 innings in relief against the Cleveland Indians. He gave up three hits and two walks, but no runs, and struck out two batters.
