= Jerry Byrne (baseball) =

American baseball player (1907–1955)

- Pitcher
- Born: February 2, 1907; Parnell, Michigan
- Died: August 11, 1955 (aged 48); Lansing, Michigan
- Batted: Right Threw: Right

MLB debut
- August 31, 1929, for the Chicago White Sox

Last MLB appearance
- October 5, 1929, for the Chicago White Sox

MLB statistics
- Win–loss record: 0–1
- Earned run average: 7.36
- Strikeouts: 1
- Stats at Baseball Reference

Teams
- Chicago White Sox (1929)

Gerald Wilford Byrne (February 2, 1907 – August 11, 1955) was a pitcher in Major League Baseball. He played for the Chicago White Sox in 1929.
