= John Goodell =

American baseball player (1907–1993)

- Pitcher
- Born: April 5, 1907; Muskogee, Oklahoma, U.S.
- Died: September 21, 1993 (aged 86); Mesquite, Texas, U.S.
- Batted: Right Threw: Left

MLB debut
- April 19, 1928, for the Chicago White Sox

Last MLB appearance
- April 27, 1928, for the Chicago White Sox

MLB statistics
- Win–loss record: 0-0
- Earned run average: 18.00
- Strikeouts: 0
- Stats at Baseball Reference

Teams
- Chicago White Sox (1928)

John Henry William Goodell (April 5, 1907 – September 21, 1993) was an American pitcher in Major League Baseball. He played for the Chicago White Sox.
