= George Cox (baseball) =

American baseball player (1904–1995)

- Pitcher
- Born: November 15, 1904; Sherman, Texas, U.S.
- Died: December 17, 1995 (aged 91); Bedford, Texas, U.S.
- Batted: Right Threw: Right

MLB debut
- April 12, 1928, for the Chicago White Sox

Last MLB appearance
- September 29, 1928, for the Chicago White Sox

MLB statistics
- Win–loss record: 1–2
- Earned run average: 5.26
- Strikeouts: 22
- Stats at Baseball Reference

Teams
- Chicago White Sox (1928)

George Melvin Cox (November 15, 1904 – December 17, 1995) was an American Major League Baseball pitcher who played for the Chicago White Sox in 1928.
