= Tommy Thomas (pitcher) =

American baseball player (1899–1988)

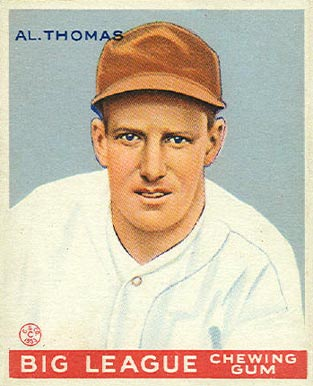
- Pitcher
- Born: December 23, 1899; Baltimore, Maryland, U.S.
- Died: April 27, 1988 (aged 88); Dallastown, Pennsylvania, U.S.
- Batted: Right Threw: Right

MLB debut
- April 17, 1926, for the Chicago White Sox

Last MLB appearance
- September 27, 1937, for the Boston Red Sox

MLB statistics
- Win–loss record: 117–128
- Earned run average: 4.11
- Strikeouts: 736
- Stats at Baseball Reference

Teams
- Chicago White Sox (1926–1932); Washington Senators (1932–1935); Philadelphia Phillies (1935); St. Louis Browns (1936–1937); Boston Red Sox (1937)

Alphonse "Tommy" Thomas (December 23, 1899 – April 27, 1988) was an American professional baseball pitcher who played in Major League Baseball for the Chicago White Sox (1926–1932), Washington Senators (1932–1935), Philadelphia Phillies (1935), St. Louis Browns (1936–1937) and Boston Red Sox (1937). He batted and threw right-handed.

== Background ==
Thomas was born in Baltimore, Maryland, and graduated from the Baltimore City College high school.

== Career ==
Thomas played for the Chicago White Sox, Washington Senators, Philadelphia Phillies, St. Louis Browns, and Boston Red Sox. From 1926 through 1929 with the White Sox, Thomas finished in the top 10 in the American League in earned run average three times and in wins three times. In 1927 he led the American League with 36 games started and tied for the American League lead with 307 2/3 innings pitched, and in 1929 he led the league with 24 complete games. In 1926 he held opposing hitters to a .244 batting average, leading all American League pitchers. In 1928, he finished 15th in the balloting for American League Most Valuable Player.

As a hitter, Thomas was better than average, posting a .195 batting average (141-for-722) with 57 runs, 3 home runs, 71 RBIs and 40 bases on balls. Defensively, he was better than average, recording a .975 fielding percentage which was 19 points higher than the league average at his position.

The Baltimore native was also a pitching star and, later, the manager of the Baltimore Orioles of the International League. Thomas pitched for the Orioles from 1921 to 1925, winning 24 games in 1921 and 32 contests in 1925. Thomas had held out for a higher salary at the start of the 1925 season, and after the season Oriole owner Jack Dunn sold him to the White Sox for a reported $15,000. He later returned briefly to Baltimore as a pitcher in 1935, and then as a pitcher-manager during the 1940s. He won 108 games and lost 56 (.659) as an Oriole pitcher, and counting his time with the Buffalo Bisons from 1918 to 1920 has a career 138–85 (.613) record in the International League. In ten seasons (1940–1949) as a manager, his Orioles posted a 638–734 record (.475) with three winning campaigns.

Thomas served as a scout for the Boston Red Sox from 1949 to 1973, except for a brief stint as general manager of Boston's American Association affiliate, the Minneapolis Millers. He died at his home in Dallastown, Pennsylvania, at age 88.
