= Buck Redfern =

American baseball player (1902–1964)

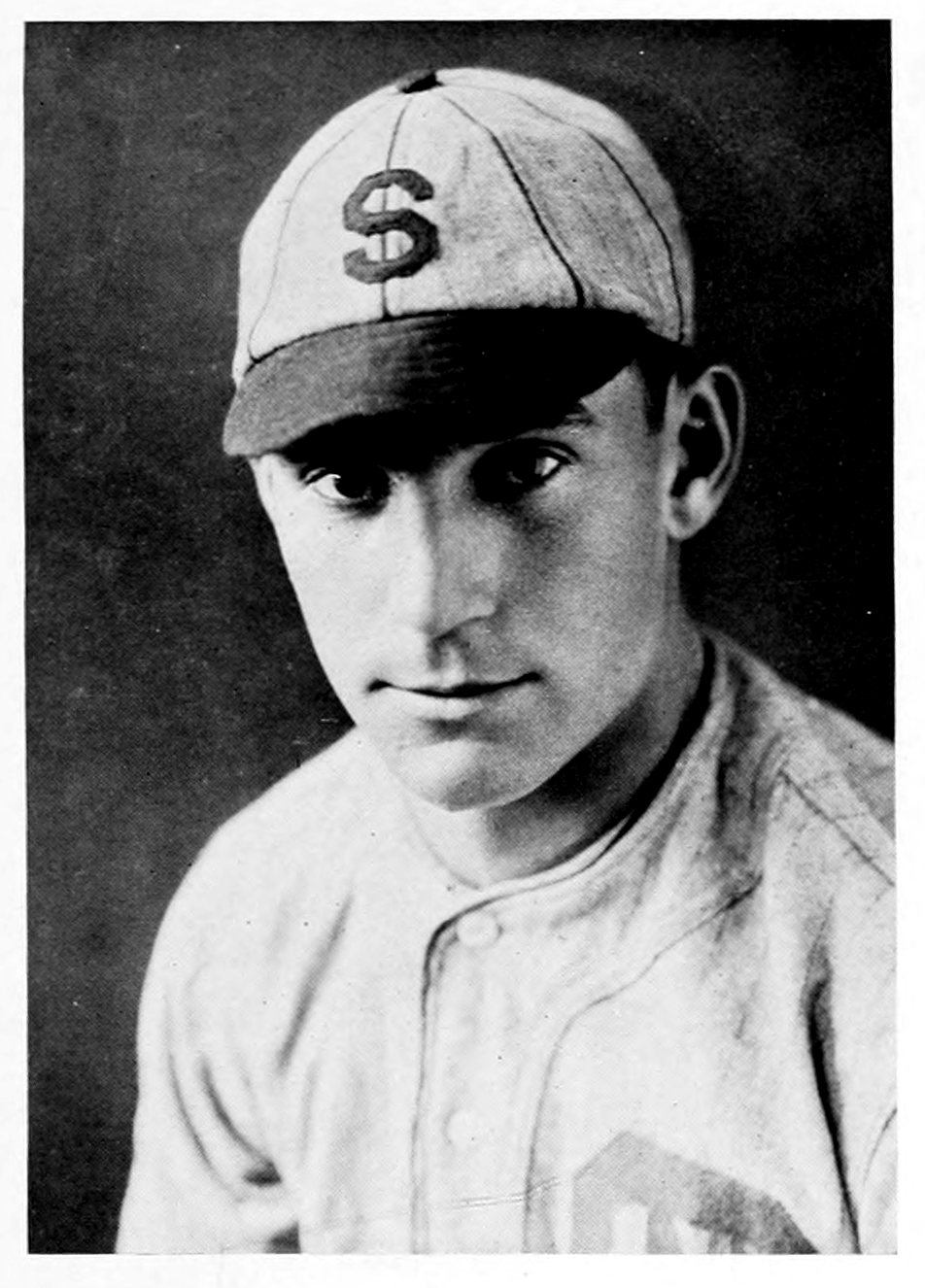
- Infielder
- Born: April 7, 1902; Asheville, North Carolina, U.S.
- Died: September 8, 1964 (aged 62); Asheville, North Carolina, U.S.
- Batted: Right Threw: Right

MLB debut
- April 11, 1928, for the Chicago White Sox

Last MLB appearance
- October 6, 1929, for the Chicago White Sox

MLB statistics
- Batting average: .218
- Home runs: 0
- Runs batted in: 38
- Stats at Baseball Reference

Teams
- Chicago White Sox (1928–1929)

George Howard "Buck" Redfern (April 7, 1902 – September 8, 1964) was an American infielder in Major League Baseball. He played for the Chicago White Sox.

Redfern attended North Carolina State College (now North Carolina State University), where he played college baseball for the Wolfpack.
