= Frank Sigafoos =

American baseball player (1904–1968)

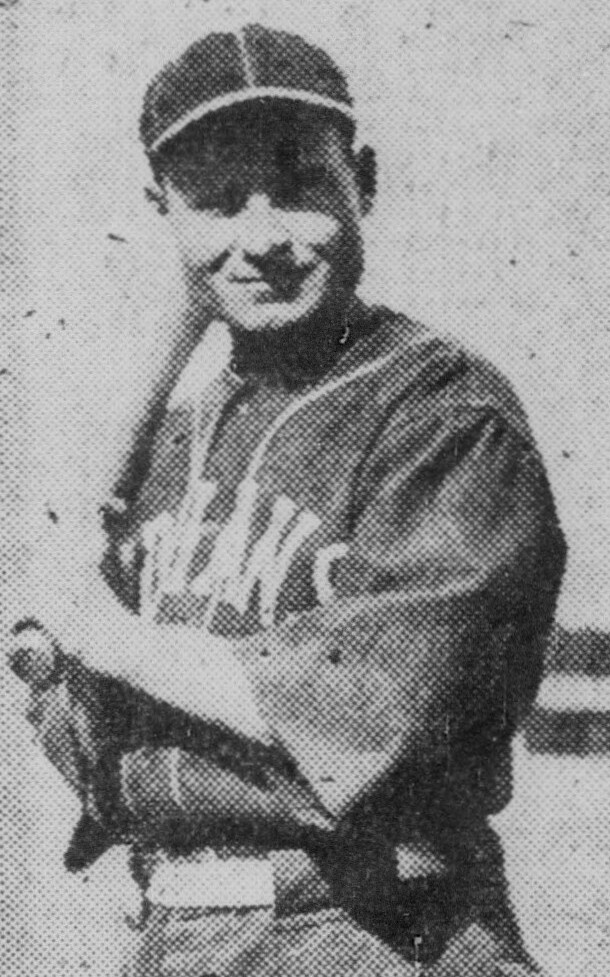
- Sigafoos, circa 1934
- Third baseman
- Born: March 21, 1904; Easton, Pennsylvania, U.S.
- Died: April 12, 1968 (aged 64); Indianapolis, Indiana, U.S.
- Batted: Right Threw: Right

MLB debut
- September 3, 1926, for the Philadelphia Athletics

Last MLB appearance
- May 30, 1931, for the Cincinnati Reds

MLB statistics
- Batting average: .201
- Hits: 27
- Runs batted in: 13
- Stats at Baseball Reference

Teams
- Philadelphia Athletics (1926); Detroit Tigers (1929); Chicago White Sox (1929); Cincinnati Reds (1931)

Francis Leonard Sigafoos (March 21, 1904 – April 12, 1968) was an American third baseman who played for the Philadelphia Athletics, Detroit Tigers, Chicago White Sox, and the Cincinnati Reds of Major League Baseball. Prior to his professional career, Sigafoos attended Purdue University, where he played college baseball for the Boilermakers from 1923–1926.
