= Bill Cissell =

American baseball player (1904–1949)

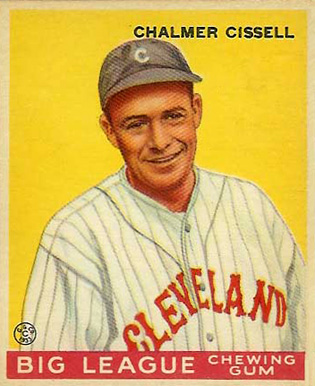
- Bill Cissell 1933 Goudey baseball card
- Infielder
- Born: January 3, 1904; Perryville, Missouri, U.S.
- Died: March 15, 1949 (aged 45); Chicago, Illinois, U.S.
- Batted: Right Threw: Right

MLB debut
- April 11, 1928, for the Chicago White Sox

Last MLB appearance
- September 25, 1938, for the New York Giants

MLB statistics
- Batting average: .267
- Home runs: 29
- Runs batted in: 423
- Stats at Baseball Reference

Teams
- Chicago White Sox (1928–1932); Cleveland Indians (1932–1933); Boston Red Sox (1934); Philadelphia Athletics (1937); New York Giants (1938)

Chalmer William Cissell (January 3, 1904 – March 15, 1949) born in Perryville, Missouri, was an American professional baseball infielder in Major League Baseball for the Chicago White Sox (1928–32), Cleveland Indians (1932–33), Boston Red Sox (1934), Philadelphia Athletics (1937) and New York Giants (1938).

He finished 15th in voting for the 1928 American League MVP for playing in 125 Games and having 443 At Bats, 66 Runs, 115 Hits, 22 Doubles, 3 Triples, 60 RBI, 18 Stolen Bases, and a .260 Batting Average. Cissell finished 11th in voting for the 1932 AL MVP for playing in 143 Games and having 584 At Bats, 85 Runs, 184 Hits, 36 Doubles, 7 Triples, 7 Home Runs, 98 RBI, 18 Stolen Bases, and a .315 Batting Average. In 9 seasons he played in 956 Games and had 3,707 At Bats, 516 Runs, 990 Hits, 173 Doubles, 43 Triples, 29 Home Runs, 423 RBI, 113 Stolen Bases, 212 Walks, and a .267 Batting Average.

Cissell died in Chicago at the age of 45.

== Sources ==
- Career statistics from Baseball Reference · Retrosheet · Baseball Almanac
