= Ed Walsh Jr. =

American baseball player (1905–1937)

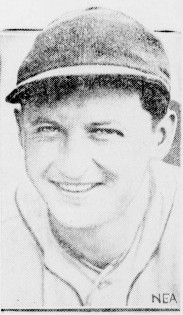
- Pitcher
- Born: February 11, 1905; Meriden, Connecticut, U.S.
- Died: October 31, 1937 (aged 32); Meriden, Connecticut, U.S.
- Batted: Right Threw: Right

MLB debut
- July 4, 1928, for the Chicago White Sox

Last MLB appearance
- September 25, 1932, for the Chicago White Sox

MLB statistics
- Win–loss record: 11–24
- Earned run average: 5.57
- Strikeouts: 107
- Stats at Baseball Reference

Teams
- Chicago White Sox (1928–1930, 1932)

Edward Arthur Walsh (February 11, 1905 – October 31, 1937) was an American professional baseball pitcher in Major League Baseball. He was from Meriden, Connecticut, and was the son of Hall of Famer Ed Walsh. He played four seasons in the Majors, all with Chicago White Sox, from 1928 through 1932.

== Career ==
After his graduation from the University of Notre Dame, where he also played college baseball, he joined the Chicago White Sox, the team that his father had become famous playing for years earlier. Over the first two years of his career, he spent most of time as a starting pitcher, with infrequent performances out of the bullpen. He found little success though, as his ERA totals were 4.96, and 5.65, with a combined record of 10–18 for the 1928 and 1929 seasons. The following year, he was no longer part of the pitching rotation, and spent most of his time as a relief pitcher, appearing in 37 games, also without much success. After the 1930 season, he only had one more showing with the Sox and the Majors, pitching in four games in 1932.

Before the 1933 season, he was bought by Oakland Oaks of the Pacific Coast League, where he has the claim to fame for stopping young Joe DiMaggio's minor league record 61-game hitting streak.

== Death ==
He suddenly became ill in late 1937, and he returned to his parents' home in Meriden, where he lapsed into a coma and died at the age of 32. It was determined that he had suffered from an acute heart ailment caused by chronic rheumatism. He was interred at Sacred Heart Cemetery in Meriden.

== See also ==
- List of second-generation Major League Baseball players
