= Grady Adkins =

American baseball player (1897–1966)

- Starting pitcher
- Born: June 29, 1897; Jacksonville, Arkansas, U.S.
- Died: March 31, 1966 (aged 68); Little Rock, Arkansas, U.S.
- Batted: Right Threw: Right

MLB debut
- April 13, 1928, for the Chicago White Sox

Last MLB appearance
- October 5, 1929, for the Chicago White Sox

MLB statistics
- Win–loss record: 12–27
- Earned run average: 4.34
- Strikeouts: 78
- Stats at Baseball Reference

Teams
- Chicago White Sox (1928–1929)

Grady Emmett Adkins (June 29, 1897 – March 31, 1966), nicknamed "Butcher Boy", was an American professional baseball player who played two seasons for the Chicago White Sox of Major League Baseball.
