= Dan Dugan (baseball) =

American baseball player (1907–1968)

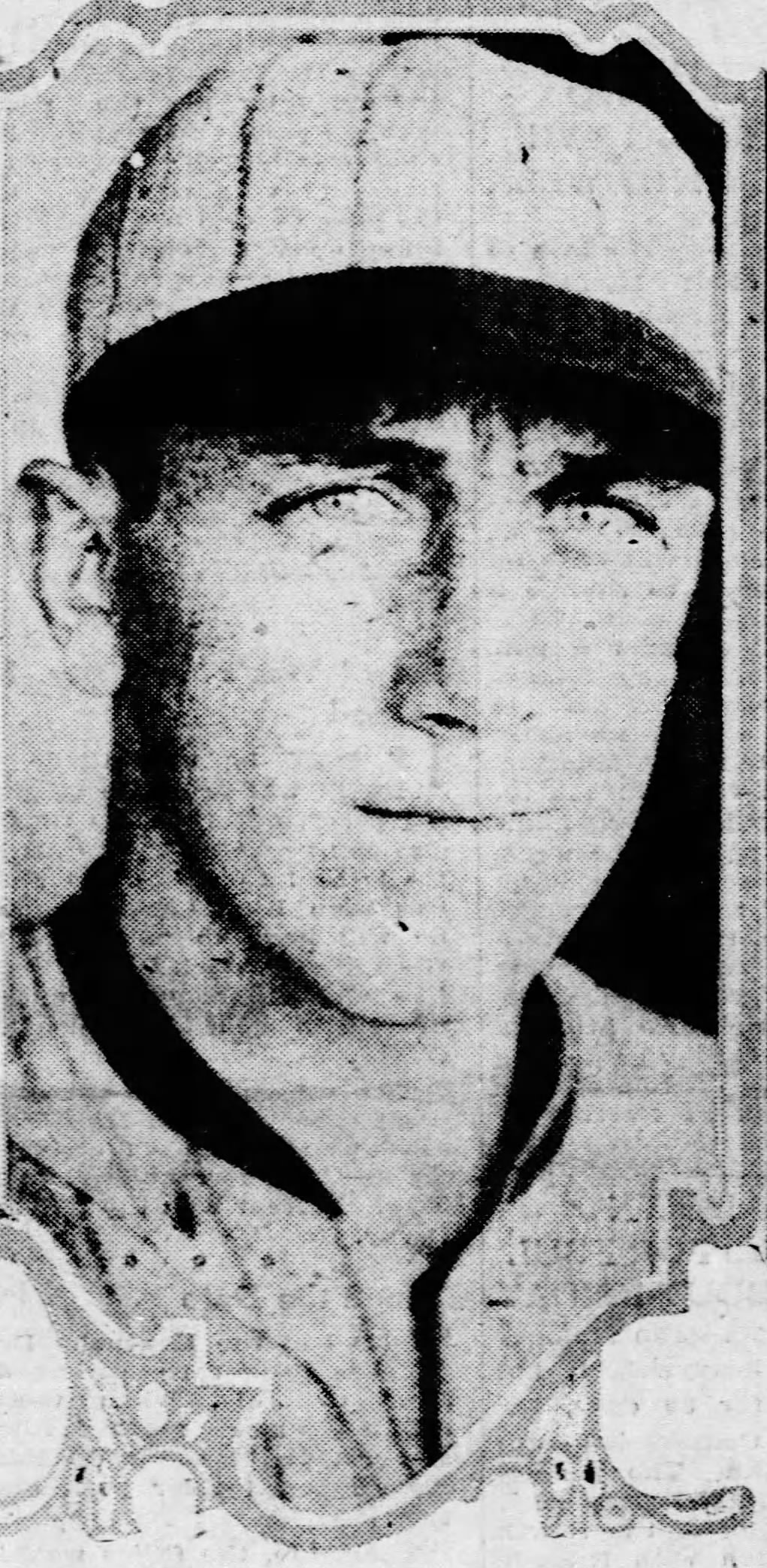
- Pitcher
- Born: February 22, 1907; Plainfield, New Jersey
- Died: June 25, 1968 (aged 61); Green Brook Township, New Jersey
- Batted: Left Threw: Left

MLB debut
- September 5, 1928, for the Chicago White Sox

Last MLB appearance
- July 16, 1929, for the Chicago White Sox

MLB statistics
- Win–loss record: 1–4
- Earned run average: 6.61
- Strikeouts: 15
- Stats at Baseball Reference

Teams
- Chicago White Sox (1928–1929)

Daniel Phillip Dugan (February 22, 1907 – June 25, 1968) was a pitcher in Major League Baseball. He played for the Chicago White Sox.
