= 1931 Boston Braves season =

1931 Boston Braves
- League: National League
- Ballpark: Braves Field
- City: Boston, Massachusetts
- Record: 64–90 (.416)
- League place: 7th
- Owners: Emil Fuchs
- Managers: Bill McKechnie
- Radio: WNAC (Fred Hoey)

The 1931 Boston Braves season was the 61st season of the franchise. The team finished seventh place in the National League with a record of 64 wins and 90 losses, 37 games behind the Saint Louis Cardinals.

== Offseason ==
- October 14, 1930: Bob Smith and Jimmy Welsh were traded by the Braves to the Chicago Cubs for Bill McAfee and Wes Schulmerich.

== Regular season ==
=== Season standings ===
National League
Team	W	L	Pct.	GB	Home	Road
St. Louis Cardinals	101	53	.656	—	54‍–‍24	47‍–‍29
New York Giants	87	65	.572	13	50‍–‍27	37‍–‍38
Chicago Cubs	84	70	.545	17	50‍–‍27	34‍–‍43
Brooklyn Robins	79	73	.520	21	46‍–‍29	33‍–‍44
Pittsburgh Pirates	75	79	.487	26	44‍–‍33	31‍–‍46
Philadelphia Phillies	66	88	.429	35	40‍–‍36	26‍–‍52
Boston Braves	64	90	.416	37	36‍–‍41	28‍–‍49
Cincinnati Reds	58	96	.377	43	38‍–‍39	20‍–‍57

=== Record vs. opponents ===
1931 National League record Sources:
Team	BSN	BRO	CHC	CIN	NYG	PHI	PIT	STL
Boston	—	11–11–1	8–14–1	8–14	6–16	11–11	11–11	9–13
Brooklyn	11–11–1	—	14–8	10–12	10–10	13–9	11–11	10–12
Chicago	14–8–1	8–14	—	14–8	12–10	14–8	14–8–1	8–14
Cincinnati	14–8	12–10	8–14	—	7–15	9–13	6–16	2–20
New York	16–6	10–10	10–12	15–7	—	14–8–1	12–10	10–12
Philadelphia	11–11	9–13	8–14	13–9	8–14–1	—	13–9	4–18
Pittsburgh	11–11	11–11	8–14–1	16–6	10–12	9–13	—	10–12
St. Louis	13–9	12–10	14–8	20–2	12–10	18–4	12–10	—

=== Roster ===
1931 Boston Braves
Roster
Pitchers: Ed Brandt; Bob Brown; Ben Cantwell; Bruce Cunningham; Fred Frankhouse; Hal Haid; Bill McAfee; Ray Moss; Socks Seibold; Bill Sherdel; Tom Zachary	Catchers: Al Bool; Bill Cronin; Al Spohrer; Infielders: Buster Chatham; Bill Dreesen; Bill Hunnefield; Freddie Maguire; Rabbit Maranville; Johnny Neun; Earl Sheely; Billy Urbanski; Bucky Walters; Charlie Wilson	Outfielders: Wally Berger; Earl Clark; Randy Moore; Lance Richbourg; Wes Schulmerich; Red Worthington; Other batters: Johnny Scalzi; Pat Veltman	Manager: Bill McKechnie; Coaches: Hank Gowdy

== Player stats ==
=== Batting ===
==== Starters by position ====
Note: Pos = Position; G = Games played; AB = At bats; H = Hits; Avg. = Batting average; HR = Home runs; RBI = Runs batted in

Pos	Player	G	AB	H	Avg.	HR	RBI
C	Al Spohrer	114	350	84	.240	0	27
1B	Earl Sheely	147	538	147	.273	1	77
2B	Freddie Maguire	148	492	112	.228	0	26
SS	Rabbit Maranville	145	562	146	.260	0	33
3B	Billy Urbanski	82	303	72	.238	0	17
OF	Red Worthington	128	491	143	.291	4	44
OF	Wes Schulmerich	95	327	101	.309	2	43
OF	Wally Berger	156	617	199	.323	19	84

==== Other batters ====
Note: G = Games played; AB = At bats; H = Hits; Avg. = Batting average; HR = Home runs; RBI = Runs batted in

Player	G	AB	H	Avg.	HR	RBI
Lance Richbourg	97	286	82	.287	2	29
Randy Moore	83	192	50	.260	3	34
Bill Dreesen	48	180	40	.222	1	10
Bill Cronin	51	107	22	.206	0	10
Johnny Neun	79	104	23	.221	0	11
Al Bool	49	85	16	.188	0	6
Charlie Wilson	16	58	11	.190	1	11
Earl Clark	16	50	11	.220	0	4
Buster Chatham	17	44	10	.227	1	3
Bucky Walters	9	38	8	.211	0	0
Bill Hunnefield	11	21	6	.286	0	1
Pat Veltman	1	1	0	.000	0	0
Johnny Scalzi	2	1	0	.000	0	0

=== Pitching ===
==== Starting pitchers ====
Note: G = Games pitched; IP = Innings pitched; W = Wins; L = Losses; ERA = Earned run average; SO = Strikeouts

Player	G	IP	W	L	ERA	SO
Ed Brandt	33	250.0	18	11	2.92	112
Tom Zachary	33	229.0	11	15	3.10	64
Socks Seibold	33	206.1	10	18	4.67	50

==== Other pitchers ====
Note: G = Games pitched; IP = Innings pitched; W = Wins; L = Losses; ERA = Earned run average; SO = Strikeouts

Player	G	IP	W	L	ERA	SO
Ben Cantwell	33	156.1	7	9	3.63	32
Bill Sherdel	27	137.2	6	10	4.25	34
Bruce Cunningham	33	136.2	3	12	4.48	32
Fred Frankhouse	26	127.1	8	8	4.03	50
Ray Moss	12	45.0	1	3	4.60	14
Bob Brown	3	6.1	0	1	8.53	2

==== Relief pitchers ====
Note: G = Games pitched; W = Wins; L = Losses; SV = Saves; ERA = Earned run average; SO = Strikeouts

Player	G	W	L	SV	ERA	SO
Hal Haid	27	0	2	1	4.50	20
Bill McAfee	18	0	1	0	6.37	9

== Farm system ==
Level	Team	League	Manager
B	Hazleton Mountaineers	New York–Pennsylvania League	Hugh Fitzgerald and Jake Pitler
