= 1931 in baseball =

The following are the baseball events of the year 1931 throughout the world.

== Champions ==
- World Series: St. Louis Cardinals over Philadelphia Athletics (4–3)

== Awards and honors ==
- MLB Most Valuable Player Award
  - Lefty Grove, Philadelphia Athletics, P
  - Frankie Frisch, St. Louis Cardinals, 2B

== Statistical leaders ==
	American League		National League		Negro National League	
Stat	Player	Total	Player	Total	Player	Total
AVG	Al Simmons (PHA)	.390	Chick Hafey (STL)	.349	Turkey Stearnes (DTS)	.411
HR	Lou Gehrig (NYY); Babe Ruth (NYY)	46	Chuck Klein (PHI)	31	Turkey Stearnes (DTS)	8
RBI	Lou Gehrig (NYY)	185	Chuck Klein (PHI)	121	Mule Suttles (SLS)	36
W	Lefty Grove^{1} (PHA)	31	Jumbo Elliott (PHI); Bill Hallahan (STL); Heinie Meine (PIT)	19	Ray Brown (ABC); Nelson Dean (DTS); George Mitchell (ABC)	7
ERA	Lefty Grove^{1} (PHA)	2.06	Bill Walker (NYG)	2.26	Logan Hensley (SLS)	1.63
K	Lefty Grove^{1} (PHA)	175	Bill Hallahan (STL)	159	Ray Brown (ABC)	79

^{1} American League Triple Crown pitching winner

== Major league baseball final standings ==
=== American League final standings ===
American League
Team	W	L	Pct.	GB	Home	Road
Philadelphia Athletics	107	45	.704	—	60‍–‍15	47‍–‍30
New York Yankees	94	59	.614	13½	51‍–‍25	43‍–‍34
Washington Senators	92	62	.597	16	55‍–‍22	37‍–‍40
Cleveland Indians	78	76	.506	30	45‍–‍31	33‍–‍45
St. Louis Browns	63	91	.409	45	39‍–‍38	24‍–‍53
Boston Red Sox	62	90	.408	45	39‍–‍40	23‍–‍50
Detroit Tigers	61	93	.396	47	36‍–‍41	25‍–‍52
Chicago White Sox	56	97	.366	51½	31‍–‍45	25‍–‍52

Locations of teams for the 1923–1931 American League seasons
American League

=== National League final standings ===
National League
Team	W	L	Pct.	GB	Home	Road
St. Louis Cardinals	101	53	.656	—	54‍–‍24	47‍–‍29
New York Giants	87	65	.572	13	50‍–‍27	37‍–‍38
Chicago Cubs	84	70	.545	17	50‍–‍27	34‍–‍43
Brooklyn Robins	79	73	.520	21	46‍–‍29	33‍–‍44
Pittsburgh Pirates	75	79	.487	26	44‍–‍33	31‍–‍46
Philadelphia Phillies	66	88	.429	35	40‍–‍36	26‍–‍52
Boston Braves	64	90	.416	37	36‍–‍41	28‍–‍49
Cincinnati Reds	58	96	.377	43	38‍–‍39	20‍–‍57

Locations of teams for the 1920–1931 National League seasons
National League

== Negro leagues final standings ==
All Negro leagues standings below are per MLB and Seamheads.

=== Negro National League final standings ===
This was the twelfth and final season of the original Negro National League. The season did not finish all games, which meant that while St. Louis was awarded the title, non-member Pittsburgh Crawford Giants disputed their status as champion.

vs. Negro National League						vs. Major Black teams			
Negro National League	W	L	T	Pct.	GB	W	L	T	Pct.
St. Louis Stars	44	11	1	.795	—	51	19	1	.725
Indianapolis ABCs	32	26	1	.551	13½	34	36	1	.486
Cleveland Cubs	23	21	0	.523	15½	27	26	0	.509
Detroit Stars	22	33	0	.400	22	25	36	0	.410
Louisville White Sox	17	34	1	.337	25	24	36	1	.402
Chicago Columbia Giants	6	19	1	.250	23	6	19	1	.250

Locations of teams for the 1931 Negro National League season
Negro National League

=== East (independent teams) final standings ===
A loose confederation of teams were gathered in the East to compete with the West, however East teams did not organize a formal league as the West did.

vs. All Teams
Independent Clubs	W	L	T	Pct.	GB
Hilldale Club	38	14	1	.726	—
Homestead Grays	34	21	1	.616	5½
Pittsburgh Crawford Giants	8	6	0	.571	11
Kansas City Monarchs	10	9	0	.526	11½
Stars of Cuba	5	7	1	.423	13
Baltimore Black Sox	22	38	1	.369	20
Harlem Stars	6	12	0	.333	15
Cuban House of David	5	14	0	.263	16½
Brooklyn Royal Giants	0	2	0	.000	13

== Events ==
=== January–April ===
- January 24 – Following his release from the Cleveland Indians four days earlier, Joe Sewell joins the New York Yankees.
- February 5 – Chicago Cubs outfielder Hack Wilson, who set National League marks for home runs (56) and runs batted in (191) the previous season, signs for $35,000. His RBI record is still standing today.
- February 21 – The Chicago White Sox and New York Giants play a ten inning exhibition game at Buffalo Stadium in Houston, Texas. It is the first major league night game.
- April 2 – Seventeen-year-old female Chattanooga Lookouts pitcher Jackie Mitchell takes the mound against the New York Yankees in a Spring training game. She strikes out the first two batters she faces: Babe Ruth and Lou Gehrig.
- April 24:
  - Rogers Hornsby has three home runs and eight runs batted in during the Cubs' 10–6 victory over the Pittsburgh Pirates.
  - The New York Giants and Philadelphia Phillies play to a twelve inning 7–7 tie at the Polo Grounds.
- April 27 – Boston Braves centerfielder Wally Berger ties a modern record with four assists in a 2–0 victory over the Philadelphia Phillies.
- April 29 – Wes Ferrell pitches a no-hitter as the Cleveland Indians defeat the St. Louis Browns, 9–0.

=== May–August ===
- May 26 – The New York Yankees defeat the Philadelphia Athletics 6–2, snapping the A's seventeen-game winning streak.
- June 13 – Pittsburgh Pirates outfielder Adam Comorosky makes an unassisted double play in a 6–4 loss to the New York Giants. It is his second unassisted double play of the season (May 31 against the Chicago Cubs).
- June 30 – The Philadelphia Athletics purchased Waite Hoyt from the Detroit Tigers. Despite a 3–8 record with Detroit, Hoyt wins his first four starts with the A's.
- July 1 – Chuck Klein hit for a cycle as he bats in 5 runs in the Phillies 11–6 victory over the Chicago Cubs.
- July 6 – The Philadelphia Athletics and Washington Senators play to a 0–0 eight inning tie.
- July 7 – The Chicago White Sox defeat the St. Louis Browns 10–8 in twelve innings. No one on either team strikes out all game.
- July 11 – The New York Giants gets 28 hits in a 23–8 victory over the Philadelphia Phillies in Game 1 of the doubleheader.
- July 12 – the Chicago Cubs–St. Louis doubleheader has 33 doubles. Due to the large crowd spilling onto the field, any ball hit into them is a ground-rule double.
- August 8 – Washington Senators pitcher Bobby Burke tosses a no-hitter in a 5–0 win over the Boston Red Sox.
- August 18 – Claude Passeau pitches a 7–0 3-hit victory over the Boston Braves to end the Phillies' 14-game losing streak, the second longest in team history.
- August 23 – Dick Coffman holds the Philadelphia Athletics to three hits on his way to a 1–0 victory, snapping Lefty Grove's sixteen-game winning streak. It is one of only two times the A's are shut out all season (the other being the 0–0 tie with the Senators on July 6).
- August 29 – Facing Cincinnati Reds pitcher Si Johnson in his second at bat in the major leagues, Chicago Cubs player Billy Herman hits Johnson's pitch, which ricochets off the bat and hits Herman in the head, knocking him out.

=== September ===
- September 1 – The New York Yankees sweep a doubleheader over the Boston Red Sox 11–3 and 5–1. But the big story was the home run race as Lou Gehrig hit 2 home runs to extended the American League lead in home runs to 2 over Babe Ruth who hit his 38th of the season.
- September 3 – In a key pennant race, the Cincinnati Reds and the Chicago Cubs were in a pitchers' duel between Owen Carroll and Pat Malone with the former having a slight edge. With two out in the tenth Taylor Douthit singled, stole second and scored home on an Edd Roush single to give the Reds a 3–2 victory over the Cubs.
- September 6 – The New York Yankees scored 8 runs in the first inning en route to a 15–3 win over The Philadelphia Athletics.
- September 8 – Hack Wilson of the Chicago Cubs who one year ago set 191 runs batted in to set an MLB record, who failed miserably this year, is exiled from the club and has been ordered to remove his belongings from the clubhouse.
- September 16 – The Philadelphia A's defeat the Cleveland Indians 7–5 for their 100th victory of the season.
- September 18 – Lefty Grove wins his 30th game of the season, 3–1 over the Chicago White Sox.
- September 27:
  - In a doubleheader on the last day of the season, the St. Louis Cardinals win their 100th & 101st game of the season. The Cardinals spent eight games out of first place all season, and were never more than 1.5 games back.
  - Lou Gehrig drives in his 184th and 185th runs of the season in a 13–1 blowout victory over the American League champion Philadelphia A's. His 185 runs batted in during the season is still an American League record to this day.

=== October–December ===
- October 1 – The Reigning World Champion Philadelphia A's take game one of the World Series, 6–2 over the team they defeated in the 1930 World Series, the St. Louis Cardinals.
- October 2 – George Earnshaw grounds into a double play and strikes out to end two potential rallies for the Athletics. The Cards take game two of the Series, 2–0, behind Bill Hallahan's three hit performance.
- October 5 – Burleigh Grimes gives up just two hits, including a two-run home run by Al Simmons in the ninth, to lead the Cardinals to a 5–2 victory in game three.
- October 6 – George Earnshaw two hits the Cards to even the series at two games apiece.
- October 7 – Bill Hallahan wins his second start of the series, 5–1.
- October 9 – Sloppy play in the fifth and seventh innings leads to five unearned runs as the A's cruise to an 8–1 victory behind Lefty Grove.
- October 10 – The St. Louis Cardinals defeat the Philadelphia Athletics, 4–2, in Game seven of the 1931 World Series, earning their second World Championship title. Bill Hallahan pitches the final out for the Cards to end the series with a 0.49 ERA.
- October 31 – The St. Louis Cardinals release pitcher Burleigh Grimes. Though Grimes would continue his MLB career, Grimes was the last pitcher who was legally allowed to throw a spitball.
- November 30 – George Gibson comes out of retirement to manage the Pittsburgh Pirates. Ten years earlier, Gibson had led the Pirates to three first-division finishes.
- December 4 – The Washington Senators trade Bump Hadley, Jackie Hayes and Sad Sam Jones to the Chicago White Sox for John Kerr and Carl Reynolds.
- December 9 – At the Winter meetings, owners, worried about the effect the Great Depression will have on baseball, vote to reduce rosters from 25 players, to 23.
- December 11 – The Chicago Cubs trade future Hall of Famer Hack Wilson and pitcher Bud Teachout to the St. Louis Cardinals in exchange for pitcher Burleigh Grimes. Wilson slumped to .261 with 13 home runs and 61 RBI, after he hit .356 with 56 HR and set a major league record with 191 RBI a year earlier.

== Births ==
=== January ===
- January 1 – Foster Castleman
- January 3 – Laurie Ann Lee
- January 6:
  - Fern Battaglia
  - Dick Tomanek
- January 7:
  - Ray Semproch
  - Bunky Stewart
- January 9 – Roy Dietzel
- January 17 – Don Zimmer
- January 18:
  - Barbara Hoffman
  - Laurin Pepper
- January 19 – Ed Sadowski
- January 29:
  - Jim Baumer
  - Hy Cohen
- January 30 – Charlie Neal
- January 31:
  - Hank Aguirre
  - Ernie Banks
  - Ruth Matlack

=== February ===
- February 1 – Bob Smith
- February 2 – Ted Tappe
- February 3 – Glenn Cox
- February 14 – Joe Caffie
- February 16 – Maurice Fisher
- February 22 – Chet Nichols Jr.
- February 25 – Jim Dunn

=== March ===
- March 7 – Dick Rand
- March 12 – Chuck Oertel
- March 13:
  - Don Bessent
  - Carlos Pascual
- March 18 – Shirley Stovroff
- March 19:
  - Al Salerno
  - Paul Smith
- March 20 – Hank Izquierdo
- March 23 – Stan Pitula
- March 27 – Bobby Prescott
- March 31 – Gene Snyder

=== April ===
- April 1 – Betty Bays
- April 5 – Fred Besana
- April 6 – Sonny Senerchia
- April 14:
  - Don Minnick
  - Kal Segrist
- April 15 – Ed Bailey
- April 23 – Patricia Brown

=== May ===
- May 6 – Willie Mays
- May 10 – Bob Bowman
- May 13 – Jack Shepard
- May 14 – Terry Rukavina
- May 15 – Ben Johnson
- May 20 – Ken Boyer
- May 25 – Jim Marshall
- May 26 – Jim Frey
- May 29 – John Baumgartner
- May 31 – Betty McKenna

=== June ===
- June 1 – Hal Smith
- June 2:
  - Marshall Bridges
  - Larry Jackson
- June 6:
  - Rudy Árias
  - Carl Willey
- June 8 – Mary McCarty
- June 9 – Bill Virdon
- June 19 – Hank Mason
- June 22 – Faye Throneberry
- June 23:
  - Doris Cook
  - Ulysses Hollimon
  - Karl Spooner
- June 27 – Chuck Coles
- June 30 – Don Gross

=== July ===
- July 3 – Ed Roebuck
- July 4 – Bobby Malkmus
- July 5 – Arnie Portocarrero
- July 7 – Betty Francis
- July 8:
  - Zach Monroe
  - Eddie Phillips
- July 9 – Gene Fodge
- July 11 – Dick Gray
- July 12 – Paul Penson
- July 15 – Bob Will
- July 16 – Norm Sherry
- July 23 – Joe Stanka
- July 24 – Marguerite Kerrigan
- July 28 – Gus Keriazakos
- July 31:
  - Rip Coleman
  - Joe Durham

=== August ===
- August 7:
  - Ray Crone
  - Motoshi Fujita
- August 9 – Chuck Essegian
- August 13 – William D. Mullins
- August 16 – Don Rudolph
- August 22 – Curt Barclay
- August 27 – Joe Cunningham

=== September ===
- September 3 – Tom Brewer
- September 6 – Stan Pawloski
- September 9:
  - Earl Averill Jr.
  - Pete Naton
- September 10 – Harry Anderson
- September 13 – George Susce
- September 14 – Don Williams
- September 16 – Jerry Schypinski
- September 19 – Ron Shoop
- September 22 – Ken Aspromonte
- September 24 – Mike Krsnich
- September 29 – Margaret Russo
- September 30 – Helen Ketola

=== October ===
- October 1 – Fred Kipp
- October 3 – Bob Skinner
- October 4 – Joe Kirrene
- October 8 – Patricia Courtney
- October 11 – Gary Blaylock
- October 13 – Eddie Mathews
- October 15 – Gail Harris
- October 16:
  - Janet Rumsey
  - Dave Sisler
- October 17 – Dan Porter
- October 18 – Andy Carey
- October 19 – Don Leppert
- October 20 – Mickey Mantle
- October 23 – Jim Bunning
- October 25 – Dick Murphy
- October 28 – Gair Allie

=== November ===
- November 1 – Russ Kemmerer
- November 4 – Marie Mansfield
- November 5 – Bill Guilfoile
- November 9 – Whitey Herzog
- November 11 – Dutch Dotterer
- November 16 – Frank Bolling
- November 22 – Neal Hertweck
- November 24 – Dick Phillips
- November 25 – John Pyecha
- November 29 – Paul Pettit
- November 30 – Ed Mayer

=== December ===
- December 3 – Bill Harris
- December 4 – Jean Buckley
- December 10 – Rudy Hernández
- December 10 – Bob Roselli
- December 13:
  - Don Erickson
  - Bubba Morton
- December 15 – Sammy Esposito
- December 16 – Neil Chrisley
- December 20 – Julio Bécquer
- December 24 – Evelio Hernández
- December 30 – Frank Torre

== Deaths ==
=== January ===
- January 4 – Roger Connor, 73, Hall of Fame first baseman, an outstanding slugger for the New York Giants who posted a .317 career average and held major league home run record until 1921, ranking first all-time in triples and second in hits, runs and RBI and upon retirement, while leading the National League in batting, hits, HRs, RBI and doubles once each, and hitting the first grand slam in major league history.
- January 14 – Hardy Richardson, 75, second baseman and outfielder who batted .300 seven times, led National League in hits and home runs with the 1886 Detroit team, and also was among to first ten players to reach 1,500 hits.

=== February ===
- February 11 – Charles Dryden, 71, sportswriter who made his name with an idiosyncratic style that emphasized personalities in the game for the many nicknames he created, including "The Peerless Leader", "The Old Roman", "Hitless Wonders".
- February 13 – Dick Phelan, 76, second baseman for the Baltimore Monumentals, Buffalo Bisons and St. Louis Maroons between the 1884 and 1885 seasons.
- February 15 – Billy Kinloch, 56, third baseman for the 1895 St. Louis Browns.

=== March ===
- March 17 – Tom Gunning, 69, catcher who played from 1884 through 1889 for the Boston Beaneaters and the Philadelphia Quakers/Athletics teams.
- March 19 – Joe Gannon, 54, pitcher for the 1898 St. Louis Browns.
- March 27 – Ernest Barnard, 56, who served as general manager of the Cleveland Indians from 1903 to 1926, and effectively ran the team following the death of owner James Dunn in 1922, while becoming the second president of the American League in following the retirement of Ban Johnson in 1927.
- March 28 – Ban Johnson, 67, founder and president of the American League from 1901 to 1927, who played major role in eradicating rowdyism prevalent in the game of the 1890s, and fiercely protected authority of umpires.

=== April ===
- April 10 – Mickey Hughes, 64, pitcher from 1888 to 1890 for the Brooklyn Bridegrooms and Philadelphia Athletics.
- April 16 – Bucky Veil, 49, pitcher for the 1903–1904 Pittsburgh Pirates. first World Series relief pitcher
- April 17 – George Daisy, 74, left fielder for the 1884 Altoona Mountain City.
- April 22 – Bill Otey, 44, pitcher for the Pittsburgh Pirates and Washington Senators during three seasons between 1907 and 1911.
- April 25 – August "Garry" Herrmann, 71, owner of the Cincinnati Reds from 1902 to 1927, who led the sport as chairman of the National Commission from 1903 to 1920, and ensured that the World Series would be held annually.
- April 28 – Mike Mattimore, 72, pitcher/outfielder for four seasons from 1887 to 1890.
- April 29:
  - Jimmy McAleer, 66, center fielder for the Cleveland Spiders who later managed American League teams in Cleveland, St. Louis and Washington, and also was part owner of the Boston Red Sox in the 1910s.
  - John Waltz, 71, manager for the Baltimore Orioles of the National League in 1892, and also an American Association executive.

=== May ===
- May 5 – John Riddle, 67, catcher/outfielder in 11 games from 1889 to 1890 for the Washington Nationals and the Philadelphia Athletics.
- May 8 – George Noftsker, 71, outfielder/catcher for the 1884 Altoona Mountain City.
- May 14 – Doc Newton, 53, pitcher for the Cincinnati Reds, Brooklyn Superbas and New York Highlanders in part of seven seasons spanning 1901–1909.
- May 17 – Charlie Ferguson, 56, pitcher for the 1901 Chicago Orphans who later umpired 122 games in the American League in 1913 and 1914.
- May 18 – Charlie Hamburg, 64, outfielder for the 1890 Louisville Colonels.
- May 23 – Bob Miller, 62, pitcher/outfielder from 1890 to 1891 for the Rochester Broncos and the Washington Statesmen.

=== June ===
- June 8 – Ed Ford, 69, infielder for the 1884 Richmond Virginians.
- June 13 – Bill O'Hara, 47, Canadian center fielder who played from 1909 to 1910 with the New York Giants and St. Louis Cardinals.
- June 16 – Andy Sommerville, 55, pitcher for the 1894 Brooklyn Grooms.
- June 23 – Clarence Cross, 75, shortstop for the Altoona Mountain City, Philadelphia Keystones, Kansas City Cowboys and New York Metropolitans in a span of four seasons from 1884 to 1887.
- June 25 – Con Lucid, 57, Irish pitcher who played from 1893 through 1897 with the Louisville Colonels, Brooklyn Grooms, Philadelphia Phillies, and St. Louis Browns.
- June 30 – Lee Dressen, 41, shortstop for the 1914 St. Louis Cardinals and the 1918 Detroit Tigers.

=== July ===
- July 11 – Alexander Donoghue, 67, outfielder/shortstop for the 1891 Philadelphia Phillies.
- July 14 – Babe Danzig, 44, first baseman for the 1909 Boston Red Sox.
- July 26 – Ben Ellis, 61, infielder for the 1896 Philadelphia Phillies.
- July 29 – Conny Doyle, 69, outfielder from 1883 to 1884 for the Philadelphia Quakers and Pittsburgh Alleghenys.

=== August ===
- August 14 – Bob Edmundson, 52, outfielder who played for the Washington Senators between the 1906 and 1908 seasons.
- August 30 – Tinsley Ginn, 39, outfielder who played with the 1914 Cleveland Naps.

=== September ===
- September 11:
  - Joe Marshall, 55, outfielder for the 1903 Pittsburgh Pirates and the 1906 St. Louis Cardinals.
  - Carl Sitton, 49, pitcher for the 1909 Cleveland Naps.
- September 12 – Pop Dillon, 57, first baseman who played with the Pittsburgh Pirates, Detroit Tigers and Brooklyn Superbas in parts of five seasons spanning 1899–1904.
- September 21 – Walter Byrne, 82, American Association umpire.

=== October ===
- October 2 – George Bradley, 79, St. Louis Brown Stockings pitcher who hurled the first no-hitter in the National's League 1876 inaugural season, also winning 45 games and leading the league with a 1.23 ERA, while setting a major league season record with 16 shutouts tied only by Grover Alexander 40 years later.
- October 6 – John Kirby, 66, National League pitcher from 1884 to 1888 for the Kansas City Cowboys, St. Louis Maroons, Indianapolis Hoosiers and Cleveland Blues.
- October 14 – Al Niehaus, 32, first baseman who played with the Pittsburgh Pirates and Cincinnati Reds during the 1925 season.
- October 15 – Oscar Graham, 53, pitcher for the 1907 Washington Senators.
- October 16 – Charles Murphy, 63, owner of the Chicago Cubs from 1906 to 1913.
- October 24 – Pete Lamer, 57, catcher for the 1902 Chicago Orphans and the 1907 Cincinnati Reds.
- October 26 – Charles Comiskey, 72, Hall of Fame first baseman/manager and owner of the Chicago White Sox since the team's formation in 1901, during which time they won four American League pennants and two World Series (1906, 1917), who previously became the first manager to win four consecutive pennants, with the St. Louis Browns (1885–1888), including the 1886 World Series title. and posted the highest winning percentage (.608) among managers of at least 1200 games.
- October 30:
  - Joe Hornung, 74, solid left fielder and speedy base runner, who played for the Buffalo Bisons, Boston Red Caps/Beaneaters, Baltimore Orioles and New York Giants in a span of 11 seasons between 1879 and 1890.
  - Jim Tyng, 75, known as the first baseball player to wear a catcher's mask while playing for Harvard University (1877), who later pitched in the National League for the Boston Red Caps (1879) and the Philadelphia Phillies (1888).

=== November ===
- November 6 – Jack Chesbro, 57, Hall of Fame pitcher; a five-time 20-games winner in 12 seasons who led both leagues in wins and winning percentage, topped the National League in shutouts twice, guided the Pittsburgh Pirates to their first pennant in 1901 and the World Series in 1902, and holds modern records with 41 wins and 48 complete games while pitching for the 1904 New York Highlanders of the American League, though he is best remembered for the wild pitch he tossed to score the Boston Red Sox pennant-clinching run on the final day of that season.
- November 8:
  - Sam Brown, 53, catcher for the 1906/1907 Boston Beaneaters/Doves of the National League.
  - Frank Meinke, 68, pitcher who played from 1884 to 1885 for the Detroit Wolverines of the National League.
- November 9 – Chris Fulmer, 73, National League catcher who played with the Washington Nationals and the Baltimore Orioles in parts of three seasons spanning 1884–1889.
- November 24 – Fred Lake, 65, Canadian catcher for the Boston Beaneaters, Louisville Colonels, Pittsburgh Pirates and Boston Doves in five season between 1891 and 1910, who also managed the Boston Red Sox in part of the 1909 season.
- November 27 – Jack Burdock, 79, National Association second baseman for three teams from 1872 to 1875, and then part of the National League's inaugural year in 1876 while playing for the Hartford Dark Blues, who later played 14 more seasons for the Boston Red Stockings/Beaneaters and the Brooklyn Bridegrooms between 1877 and 1881, became the third out of the first triple play in National League history during the 1876 season, and also batted the first unassisted triple play two years later.

=== December ===
- December 8 – Jack Bellman, 67, backup catcher for the 1889 St. Louis Browns.
- December 10 – Tex Covington, 44, pitcher for the Detroit Tigers from 1911 to 1912.
- December 11 – George Harper, 65, pitcher who played with the Philadelphia Phillies in 1894 and the Brooklyn Bridegrooms in 1896.
- December 13 – Al Schulz, 42, pitcher for the New York Highlanders/Yankees, Buffalo Buffeds/Blues and Cincinnati Reds from 1912 through 1916.
- December 18 – C. V. Matteson, 70, who pitched one game for the 1884 St. Louis Maroons of the Union Association.
