= 1931 Chicago Cubs season =

1931 Chicago Cubs
- League: National League
- Ballpark: Wrigley Field
- City: Chicago
- Record: 84–70 (.545)
- League place: 3rd
- Owners: William Wrigley Jr.
- Managers: Rogers Hornsby
- Radio: WCFL (Johnny O'Hara); WGN (Bob Elson); WBBM (Pat Flanagan); WMAQ (Hal Totten); WLS; WJJD; WENR

The 1931 Chicago Cubs season was the 60th season of the Chicago Cubs franchise, the 56th in the National League and the 16th at Wrigley Field. The Cubs finished third in the National League with a record of 84–70, 17 games behind the St. Louis Cardinals.

== Offseason ==
- October 14, 1930: Bill McAfee and Wes Schulmerich were traded by the Cubs to the Boston Braves for Bob Smith and Jimmy Welsh.

== Regular season ==
1931 was one of player-manager Rogers Hornsby's last productive seasons. He managed to drive in 90 runs and collect 37 doubles in only 100 games, while recording a batting average of .331. He led the league in on-base percentage (.421) for the ninth and last time in his career.

=== Season standings ===
National League
Team	W	L	Pct.	GB	Home	Road
St. Louis Cardinals	101	53	.656	—	54‍–‍24	47‍–‍29
New York Giants	87	65	.572	13	50‍–‍27	37‍–‍38
Chicago Cubs	84	70	.545	17	50‍–‍27	34‍–‍43
Brooklyn Robins	79	73	.520	21	46‍–‍29	33‍–‍44
Pittsburgh Pirates	75	79	.487	26	44‍–‍33	31‍–‍46
Philadelphia Phillies	66	88	.429	35	40‍–‍36	26‍–‍52
Boston Braves	64	90	.416	37	36‍–‍41	28‍–‍49
Cincinnati Reds	58	96	.377	43	38‍–‍39	20‍–‍57

=== Record vs. opponents ===
1931 National League record Sources:
Team	BSN	BRO	CHC	CIN	NYG	PHI	PIT	STL
Boston	—	11–11–1	8–14–1	8–14	6–16	11–11	11–11	9–13
Brooklyn	11–11–1	—	14–8	10–12	10–10	13–9	11–11	10–12
Chicago	14–8–1	8–14	—	14–8	12–10	14–8	14–8–1	8–14
Cincinnati	14–8	12–10	8–14	—	7–15	9–13	6–16	2–20
New York	16–6	10–10	10–12	15–7	—	14–8–1	12–10	10–12
Philadelphia	11–11	9–13	8–14	13–9	8–14–1	—	13–9	4–18
Pittsburgh	11–11	11–11	8–14–1	16–6	10–12	9–13	—	10–12
St. Louis	13–9	12–10	14–8	20–2	12–10	18–4	12–10	—

=== Notable transactions ===
- June 13, 1931: Earl Grace was traded by the Cubs to the Pittsburgh Pirates for Rollie Hemsley.

=== Roster ===
1931 Chicago Cubs
Roster
Pitchers: Ed Baecht; Sheriff Blake; Guy Bush; Pat Malone; Jakie May; Charlie Root; Bob Smith; Les Sweetland; Bud Teachout; Lon Warneke; Johnny Welch	Catchers: Earl Grace; Gabby Hartnett; Rollie Hemsley; Zack Taylor; Infielders: Jimmy Adair; Les Bell; Footsie Blair; Woody English; Charlie Grimm; Billy Herman; Rogers Hornsby; Billy Jurges	Outfielders: Vince Barton; Kiki Cuyler; Mike Kreevich; Johnny Moore; Riggs Stephenson; Danny Taylor; Hack Wilson	Manager: Rogers Hornsby; Coaches: Charley O'Leary; Ray Schalk

== Player stats ==
=== Batting ===
==== Starters by position ====
Note: Pos = Position; G = Games played; AB = At bats; H = Hits; Avg. = Batting average; HR = Home runs; RBI = Runs batted in

Pos	Player	G	AB	H	Avg.	HR	RBI
C	Gabby Hartnett	116	380	107	.282	8	70
1B	Charlie Grimm	146	531	176	.331	4	66
2B	Rogers Hornsby	100	357	118	.331	16	90
SS	Woody English	156	634	202	.319	2	53
3B	Les Bell	75	252	71	.282	4	32
OF	Danny Taylor	88	270	81	.300	5	41
OF	Kiki Cuyler	154	613	202	.330	9	88
OF	Hack Wilson	112	395	103	.261	13	61

==== Other batters ====
Note: G = Games played; AB = At bats; H = Hits; Avg. = Batting average; HR = Home runs; RBI = Runs batted in

Player	G	AB	H	Avg.	HR	RBI
Bill Jurges	88	293	59	.201	0	23
Riggs Stephenson	80	263	84	.319	1	52
Footsie Blair	86	240	62	.258	3	29
Vince Barton	66	239	57	.238	13	50
Rollie Hemsley	66	204	63	.309	3	31
Johnny Moore	39	104	25	.240	2	16
Billy Herman	25	98	32	.327	0	16
Jimmy Adair	18	76	21	.276	0	3
Mike Kreevich	5	12	2	.167	0	0
Earl Grace	7	9	1	.111	0	1
Zack Taylor	8	4	1	.250	0	0

=== Pitching ===
==== Starting pitchers ====
Note: G = Games pitched; IP = Innings pitched; W = Wins; L = Losses; ERA = Earned run average; SO = Strikeouts

Player	G	IP	W	L	ERA	SO
Charlie Root	39	251.0	17	14	3.48	131
Bob Smith	36	240.1	15	12	3.22	63
Pat Malone	36	228.1	16	9	3.90	112

==== Other pitchers ====
Note: G = Games pitched; IP = Innings pitched; W = Wins; L = Losses; ERA = Earned run average; SO = Strikeouts

Player	G	IP	W	L	ERA	SO
Guy Bush	39	180.1	16	8	4.49	54
Les Sweetland	26	130.1	8	7	5.04	32
Ed Baecht	22	67.0	2	4	3.76	34
Lon Warneke	20	64.1	2	4	3.22	27
Sheriff Blake	16	50.0	0	4	5.22	29
Johnny Welch	8	33.2	2	1	3.74	7

==== Relief pitchers ====
Note: G = Games pitched; W = Wins; L = Losses; SV = Saves; ERA = Earned run average; SO = Strikeouts

Player	G	W	L	SV	ERA	SO
Jakie May	31	5	5	2	3.87	38
Bud Teachout	27	1	2	0	5.72	14

== Farm system ==
Level	Team	League	Manager
AA	Los Angeles Angels	Pacific Coast League	Jack Lelivelt
D	Bisbee Bees	Arizona–Texas League	Roy Johnson
