= 1931 Pittsburgh Pirates season =

1931 Pittsburgh Pirates
- League: National League
- Ballpark: Forbes Field
- City: Pittsburgh, Pennsylvania
- Owners: Barney Dreyfuss
- Managers: Jewel Ens

The 1931 Pittsburgh Pirates season was the 50th season of the Pittsburgh Pirates franchise; the 45th in the National League. The Pirates finished fifth in the league standings with a record of 75–79.

== Offseason ==
- November 6, 1930: Dick Bartell was traded by the Pirates to the Philadelphia Phillies for Tommy Thevenow and Claude Willoughby.

== Regular season ==
=== Notable transactions ===
- June 13, 1931: Rollie Hemsley was traded by the Pirates to the Chicago Cubs for Earl Grace.

=== Season standings ===
National League
Team	W	L	Pct.	GB	Home	Road
St. Louis Cardinals	101	53	.656	—	54‍–‍24	47‍–‍29
New York Giants	87	65	.572	13	50‍–‍27	37‍–‍38
Chicago Cubs	84	70	.545	17	50‍–‍27	34‍–‍43
Brooklyn Robins	79	73	.520	21	46‍–‍29	33‍–‍44
Pittsburgh Pirates	75	79	.487	26	44‍–‍33	31‍–‍46
Philadelphia Phillies	66	88	.429	35	40‍–‍36	26‍–‍52
Boston Braves	64	90	.416	37	36‍–‍41	28‍–‍49
Cincinnati Reds	58	96	.377	43	38‍–‍39	20‍–‍57

=== Record vs. opponents ===
1931 National League record Sources:
Team	BSN	BRO	CHC	CIN	NYG	PHI	PIT	STL
Boston	—	11–11–1	8–14–1	8–14	6–16	11–11	11–11	9–13
Brooklyn	11–11–1	—	14–8	10–12	10–10	13–9	11–11	10–12
Chicago	14–8–1	8–14	—	14–8	12–10	14–8	14–8–1	8–14
Cincinnati	14–8	12–10	8–14	—	7–15	9–13	6–16	2–20
New York	16–6	10–10	10–12	15–7	—	14–8–1	12–10	10–12
Philadelphia	11–11	9–13	8–14	13–9	8–14–1	—	13–9	4–18
Pittsburgh	11–11	11–11	8–14–1	16–6	10–12	9–13	—	10–12
St. Louis	13–9	12–10	14–8	20–2	12–10	18–4	12–10	—

=== Game log ===
1931 Game Log: 75–79 (Home: 44–33; Away: 31–46)
April: 6–8 (Home: 1–2; Away: 5–6)

#	Date	Opponent	Score	Win	Loss	Save	Attendance	Record
1	April 14	@ Cubs	2–6	Root	**French** (0–1)	—	45,000	0–1
2	April 15	@ Cubs	5–6	Smith	**Willoughby** (0–1)	—	—	0–2
3	April 16	@ Cubs	4–3	**Spencer** (1–0)	Blake	—	—	1–2
4	April 17	@ Cubs	4–5	Bush	**Wood** (0–1)	Smith	30,000	1–3
5	April 18	@ Reds	9–6	**French** (1–1)	Wysong	—	—	2–3
6	April 19	@ Reds	5–1	**Kremer** (1–0)	Johnson	—	—	3–3
7	April 20	@ Reds	5–7	Lucas	**Meine** (0–1)	—	—	3–4
8	April 24	Cubs	6–10	Sweetland	**French** (1–2)	—	—	3–5
9	April 25	Cubs	3–8	Malone	**Kremer** (1–1)	May	—	3–6
10	April 26	@ Cardinals	1–0	**Meine** (1–1)	Hallahan	—	—	4–6
11	April 27	@ Cardinals	5–3	**French** (2–2)	Rhem	—	—	5–6
12	April 28	@ Cardinals	2–8	Grimes	**Wood** (0–2)	—	—	5–7
13	April 29	@ Cardinals	1–7	Haines	**Kremer** (1–2)	—	—	5–8
14	April 30	Reds	8–3	**Meine** (2–1)	Rixey	—	—	6–8

May: 11–14 (Home: 2–6; Away: 9–8)

#	Date	Opponent	Score	Win	Loss	Save	Attendance	Record
15	May 1	Reds	5–4 (11)	**Spencer** (2–0)	Carroll	—	—	7–8
16	May 2	Reds	11–5	**Osborn** (1–0)	Ogden	—	—	8–8
17	May 3	@ Reds	6–3	**Kremer** (2–2)	Lucas	—	—	9–8
18	May 3	@ Reds	5–10	Kolp	**Wood** (0–3)	—	—	9–9
19	May 6	Cardinals	5–6 (13)	Grimes	**Meine** (2–2)	Lindsey	—	9–10
20	May 7	Cardinals	5–11	Haines	**French** (2–3)	—	—	9–11
21	May 9	Cardinals	2–4	Johnson	**Kremer** (2–3)	—	—	9–12
22	May 10	@ Robins	3–1	**French** (3–3)	Phelps	—	28,000	10–12
23	May 11	@ Robins	4–2	**Meine** (3–2)	Vance	—	5,000	11–12
24	May 15	@ Giants	3–2 (10)	**French** (4–3)	Mitchell	—	8,000	12–12
25	May 16	@ Braves	2–9	Zachary	**Kremer** (2–4)	—	15,000	12–13
26	May 17	@ Braves	5–3	**Meine** (4–2)	Seibold	—	—	13–13
27	May 18	@ Braves	1–3	Brandt	**Brame** (0–1)	—	—	13–14
28	May 19	@ Phillies	2–3	Elliott	**French** (4–4)	Elliott	—	13–15
29	May 20	@ Phillies	7–11	Shields	**Willoughby** (0–2)	—	—	13–16
30	May 23	@ Cubs	4–3	**Meine** (5–2)	Malone	**Spencer** (1)	—	14–16
31	May 24	@ Cubs	10–7	**Brame** (1–1)	Root	**Spencer** (2)	—	15–16
32	May 25	@ Cubs	6–9	Sweetland	**Kremer** (2–5)	—	—	15–17
33	May 26	@ Cardinals	9–11	Derringer	**Spencer** (2–1)	—	—	15–18
34	May 27	@ Cardinals	4–0	**Meine** (6–2)	Johnson	—	—	16–18
35	May 28	@ Cardinals	11–8 (7)	**Osborn** (2–0)	Rhem	—	—	17–18
36	May 29	Cubs	3–4 (10)	Root	**Kremer** (2–6)	—	—	17–19
37	May 30	Cubs	2–9	Sweetland	**Spencer** (2–2)	—	10,000	17–20
38	May 30	Cubs	5–6	May	**Brame** (1–2)	Root	18,000	17–21
39	May 31	@ Cubs	0–5	Smith	**Meine** (6–3)	—	30,000	17–22

June: 8–18 (Home: 4–7; Away: 4–11)

#	Date	Opponent	Score	Win	Loss	Save	Attendance	Record
40	June 2	Braves	4–3	**Osborn** (3–0)	Brandt	—	—	18–22
41	June 3	Braves	3–4 (10)	Seibold	**Brame** (1–3)	—	—	18–23
42	June 4	Braves	2–1 (13)	**Spencer** (3–2)	Haid	—	—	19–23
43	June 5	Braves	0–4	Zachary	**Meine** (6–4)	—	—	19–24
44	June 6	Phillies	3–2	**Kremer** (3–6)	Elliott	—	—	20–24
45	June 9	Phillies	3–7	Dudley	**Brame** (1–4)	Elliott	—	20–25
46	June 10	Giants	5–1	**French** (5–4)	Walker	—	—	21–25
47	June 11	Giants	6–8 (11)	Berly	**Spencer** (3–3)	—	5,000	21–26
48	June 12	Giants	2–8	Fitzsimmons	**Kremer** (3–7)	—	—	21–27
49	June 13	Giants	4–6	Mitchell	**Brame** (1–5)	—	—	21–28
50	June 14	@ Robins	3–6	Shaute	**French** (5–5)	Quinn	15,000	21–29
51	June 17	Robins	0–2	Clark	**Meine** (6–5)	—	—	21–30
52	June 18	@ Giants	1–3	Hubbell	**French** (5–6)	—	—	21–31
53	June 19	@ Giants	4–1	**Kremer** (4–7)	Mitchell	—	—	22–31
54	June 20	@ Giants	1–3	Walker	**Spencer** (3–4)	—	30,000	22–32
55	June 20	@ Giants	0–10	Fitzsimmons	**Brame** (1–6)	—	30,000	22–33
56	June 21	@ Giants	5–4 (11)	**French** (6–6)	Heving	—	—	23–33
57	June 22	@ Robins	2–3 (10)	Clark	**Wood** (0–4)	—	—	23–34
58	June 24	@ Robins	4–6	Shaute	**French** (6–7)	—	—	23–35
59	June 24	@ Robins	3–5	Heimach	**Kremer** (4–8)	—	20,000	23–36
60	June 25	@ Phillies	1–5	Dudley	**Brame** (1–7)	—	—	23–37
61	June 26	@ Phillies	2–13	Watt	**Meine** (6–6)	—	—	23–38
62	June 27	@ Phillies	10–6	**Wood** (1–4)	Elliott	**Swetonic** (1)	15,000	24–38
63	June 27	@ Phillies	4–5	Benge	**French** (6–8)	Collins	15,000	24–39
64	June 29	@ Braves	4–2	**Kremer** (5–8)	Zachary	—	—	25–39
65	June 30	@ Braves	1–5	Frankhouse	**Brame** (1–8)	—	—	25–40

July: 19–10 (Home: 16–8; Away: 3–2)

#	Date	Opponent	Score	Win	Loss	Save	Attendance	Record
66	July 1	@ Braves	4–1	**Spencer** (4–4)	Seibold	—	—	26–40
67	July 2	@ Braves	1–0	**Meine** (7–6)	Cunningham	—	—	27–40
68	July 4	Cardinals	9–8 (11)	**Osborn** (4–0)	Lindsey	—	—	28–40
69	July 4	Cardinals	3–4 (12)	Hallahan	**Kremer** (5–9)	—	—	28–41
70	July 5	@ Reds	6–4	**Brame** (2–8)	Johnson	—	—	29–41
71	July 8	Cubs	5–2	**Meine** (8–6)	Warneke	—	—	30–41
72	July 9	Cubs	4–2	**Kremer** (6–9)	Teachout	—	—	31–41
73	July 11	Cubs	2–9	Sweetland	**Spencer** (4–5)	—	—	31–42
74	July 11	Cubs	5–5 (10)			—	—	31–42
75	July 12	@ Reds	7–14	Lucas	**Meine** (8–7)	—	—	31–43
76	July 12	@ Reds	5–6 (11)	Benton	**Swetonic** (0–1)	—	—	31–44
77	July 13	Phillies	0–1	Elliott	**Kremer** (6–10)	—	—	31–45
78	July 14	Phillies	9–4	**Meine** (9–7)	Dudley	—	—	32–45
79	July 14	Phillies	4–3 (10)	**Spencer** (5–5)	Collins	—	—	33–45
80	July 15	Phillies	4–2	**French** (7–8)	Benge	—	—	34–45
81	July 16	Phillies	12–8	**Brame** (3–8)	Bolen	—	—	35–45
82	July 17	Phillies	1–4	Elliott	**Kremer** (6–11)	—	—	35–46
83	July 18	Braves	9–3	**Meine** (10–7)	Seibold	—	—	36–46
84	July 18	Braves	0–1	Cantwell	**Spencer** (5–6)	—	—	36–47
85	July 22	Robins	10–6	**French** (8–8)	Shaute	—	—	37–47
86	July 22	Robins	2–3	Heimach	**Kremer** (6–12)	—	8,000	37–48
87	July 23	Robins	17–6	**Brame** (4–8)	Vance	—	3,000	38–48
88	July 24	Robins	8–7	**Osborn** (5–0)	Clark	**French** (1)	—	39–48
89	July 25	Robins	5–2	**Wood** (2–4)	Luque	—	12,000	40–48
90	July 25	Robins	3–2 (14)	**French** (9–8)	Heimach	—	17,000	41–48
91	July 27	Giants	8–6	**Kremer** (7–12)	Mitchell	**Spencer** (3)	—	42–48
92	July 28	Giants	2–6	Hubbell	**Brame** (4–9)	—	—	42–49
93	July 29	Giants	4–5	Walker	**Meine** (10–8)	—	—	42–50
94	July 30	Giants	9–0	**French** (10–8)	Morrell	—	—	43–50
95	July 31	Reds	5–0	**Kremer** (8–12)	Benton	—	—	44–50

August: 15–20 (Home: 6–4; Away: 9–16)

#	Date	Opponent	Score	Win	Loss	Save	Attendance	Record
96	August 1	Reds	1–0	**Spencer** (6–6)	Rixey	—	—	45–50
97	August 2	@ Reds	3–0	**Brame** (5–9)	Lucas	—	—	46–50
98	August 4	Cardinals	1–7	Haines	**Meine** (10–9)	—	—	46–51
99	August 5	Cardinals	5–4 (12)	**French** (11–8)	Lindsey	—	—	47–51
100	August 5	Cardinals	2–16	Hallahan	**Wood** (2–5)	—	—	47–52
101	August 6	Reds	2–3	Benton	**Spencer** (6–7)	—	—	47–53
102	August 7	Reds	9–3	**Kremer** (9–12)	Lucas	—	—	48–53
103	August 8	Reds	4–3	**Meine** (11–9)	Johnson	—	—	49–53
104	August 9	@ Reds	2–6	Benton	**French** (11–9)	—	—	49–54
105	August 9	@ Reds	8–4	**Brame** (6–9)	Frey	—	—	50–54
106	August 10	Cubs	4–3	**Spencer** (7–7)	Sweetland	—	—	51–54
107	August 12	@ Giants	6–4	**Kremer** (10–12)	Hubbell	—	—	52–54
108	August 12	@ Giants	0–9	Walker	**Meine** (11–10)	—	—	52–55
109	August 13	@ Giants	7–5	**Brame** (7–9)	Fitzsimmons	—	—	53–55
110	August 13	@ Giants	1–6	Mitchell	**French** (11–10)	—	10,000	53–56
111	August 14	@ Giants	1–2	Mooney	**Spencer** (7–8)	—	—	53–57
112	August 15	@ Phillies	4–5	Dudley	**Wood** (2–6)	Collins	—	53–58
113	August 15	@ Phillies	1–3	Bolen	**Meine** (11–11)	Watt	—	53–59
114	August 17	@ Phillies	4–2	**French** (12–10)	Blake	—	—	54–59
115	August 17	@ Phillies	0–3	Collins	**Brame** (7–10)	—	—	54–60
116	August 18	@ Phillies	14–5	**Spencer** (8–8)	Bolen	—	—	55–60
117	August 20	@ Braves	1–2 (10)	Brandt	**Swetonic** (0–2)	—	—	55–61
118	August 20	@ Braves	5–4	**Meine** (12–11)	Sherdel	—	—	56–61
119	August 21	@ Braves	1–2	Cantwell	**Brame** (7–11)	—	—	56–62
120	August 22	@ Braves	1–2	Zachary	**Spencer** (8–9)	—	—	56–63
121	August 23	@ Robins	4–5	Shaute	**Meine** (12–12)	—	—	56–64
122	August 23	@ Robins	4–5	Quinn	**Osborn** (5–1)	—	15,000	56–65
123	August 25	@ Robins	5–3	**Meine** (13–12)	Clark	—	—	57–65
124	August 25	@ Robins	0–5	Heimach	**Kremer** (10–13)	—	25,000	57–66
125	August 27	Cubs	3–2	**Spencer** (9–9)	Sweetland	—	—	58–66
126	August 27	Cubs	4–11	Welch	**Brame** (7–12)	—	—	58–67
127	August 28	@ Cardinals	4–6	Lindsey	**French** (12–11)	Hallahan	25,000	58–68
128	August 29	@ Cardinals	8–2	**Meine** (14–12)	Johnson	—	7,500	59–68
129	August 30	@ Cardinals	0–5	Derringer	**Kremer** (10–14)	—	—	59–69
130	August 30	@ Cardinals	1–4	Hallahan	**Spencer** (9–10)	—	—	59–70

September: 16–9 (Home: 15–6; Away: 1–3)

#	Date	Opponent	Score	Win	Loss	Save	Attendance	Record
131	September 3	Cardinals	6–4	**Osborn** (6–1)	Grimes	—	—	60–70
132	September 4	Cardinals	3–1	**Meine** (15–12)	Hallahan	—	—	61–70
133	September 5	Cardinals	8–5	**Kremer** (11–14)	Lindsey	—	—	62–70
134	September 6	@ Cubs	5–4	**Spencer** (10–10)	Root	—	—	63–70
135	September 7	Reds	6–1	**French** (13–11)	Carroll	—	—	64–70
136	September 7	Reds	4–2	**Brame** (8–12)	Rixey	—	—	65–70
137	September 8	Reds	3–0	**Harris** (1–0)	Ogden	—	—	66–70
138	September 9	Robins	5–1	**Meine** (16–12)	Heimach	—	—	67–70
139	September 10	Giants	1–6	Hubbell	**Kremer** (11–15)	—	—	67–71
140	September 11	Giants	3–2	**French** (14–11)	Parmelee	—	—	68–71
141	September 12	Giants	5–1	**Harris** (2–0)	Mooney	—	—	69–71
142	September 13	@ Robins	5–6	Heimach	**Spencer** (10–11)	—	10,000	69–72
143	September 15	Robins	5–2	**Meine** (17–12)	Clark	—	—	70–72
144	September 15	Robins	2–1	**French** (15–11)	Vance	—	4,000	71–72
145	September 16	Robins	5–11	Clark	**Brame** (8–13)	—	—	71–73
146	September 17	Braves	0–1	Zachary	**Harris** (2–1)	—	—	71–74
147	September 17	Braves	4–2 (8)	**Spencer** (11–11)	Brown	—	—	72–74
148	September 18	Braves	2–6	Brandt	**French** (15–12)	—	—	72–75
149	September 18	Braves	4–1	**Meine** (18–12)	Sherdel	—	—	73–75
150	September 19	Braves	7–0	**Brame** (9–13)	Frankhouse	—	—	74–75
151	September 21	Phillies	4–6	Elliott	**Harris** (2–2)	Benge	—	74–76
152	September 22	Phillies	3–2 (13)	**Meine** (19–12)	Collins	—	—	75–76
153	September 24	Phillies	1–5	Elliott	**French** (15–13)	—	—	75–77
154	September 27	@ Cubs	1–3	Root	**Meine** (19–13)	Smith	—	75–78
155	September 27	@ Cubs	4–8	Malone	**Spencer** (11–12)	—	—	75–79

Legend: = Win = Loss = Tie
Bold = Pirates team member

=== Roster ===
1931 Pittsburgh Pirates
**Roster**
**Pitchers**: Andy Bednar; Erv Brame; Larry French; George Grant; Bill Harris; Ray Kremer; Heinie Meine; Bob Osborn; Glenn Spencer; Steve Swetonic; Claude Willoughby; Spades Wood	**Catchers**: Hal Finney; Earl Grace; Rollie Hemsley; Eddie Phillips; Bill Steinecke; **Infielders**: George Grantham; Howdy Groskloss; Tony Piet; Bill Regan; Ben Sankey; Gus Suhr; Tommy Thevenow; Pie Traynor	**Outfielders**: Fred Bennett; Adam Comorosky; Woody Jensen; Jim Mosolf; Lloyd Waner; Paul Waner; **Other batters**: Pete McClanahan	**Manager**: Jewel Ens; **Coaches**: Doc Crandall; Grover Hartley; Oscar Stanage

== Player stats ==
=== Batting ===
==== Starters by position ====
Note: Pos = Position; G = Games played; AB = At bats; H = Hits; Avg. = Batting average; HR = Home runs; RBI = Runs batted in

Pos	Player	G	AB	H	Avg.	HR	RBI
C	Eddie Phillips	106	353	82	.232	7	44
1B	George Grantham	127	465	142	.305	10	46
2B	Tony Piet	44	167	50	.299	0	24
SS	Tommy Thevenow	120	404	86	.213	0	38
3B	Pie Traynor	155	615	183	.298	2	103
OF	Lloyd Waner	154	681	214	.314	4	57
OF	Paul Waner	150	559	180	.322	6	70
OF	Adam Comorosky	99	350	85	.243	1	48

==== Other batters ====
Note: G = Games played; AB = At bats; H = Hits; Avg. = Batting average; HR = Home runs; RBI = Runs batted in

Player	G	AB	H	Avg.	HR	RBI
Gus Suhr	87	270	57	.211	4	32
Woody Jensen	73	267	65	.243	3	17
Howdy Groskloss	53	161	45	.280	0	20
Earl Grace	47	150	42	.280	1	20
Ben Sankey	57	132	30	.227	0	14
Bill Regan	28	104	21	.202	1	10
Fred Bennett	32	89	25	.281	1	7
Jim Mosolf	39	44	11	.250	1	8
Rollie Hemsley	10	35	6	.171	0	1
Hal Finney	10	26	8	.308	0	2
Pete McClanahan	7	4	2	.500	0	0
Bill Steinecke	4	4	0	.000	0	0

=== Pitching ===
==== Starting pitchers ====
Note: G = Games pitched; IP = Innings pitched; W = Wins; L = Losses; ERA = Earned run average; SO = Strikeouts

Player	G	IP	W	L	ERA	SO
Heinie Meine	36	284.0	19	13	2.98	58
Larry French	39	275.2	15	13	3.26	73
Ray Kremer	30	230.0	11	15	3.33	58
Erv Brame	26	179.2	9	13	4.21	33
Bill Harris	4	31.0	2	2	0.87	10

==== Other pitchers ====
Note: G = Games pitched; IP = Innings pitched; W = Wins; L = Losses; ERA = Earned run average; SO = Strikeouts

Player	G	IP	W	L	ERA	SO
Glenn Spencer	38	186.2	11	12	3.42	51
Spades Wood	15	64.0	2	6	6.05	33
Claude Willoughby	9	25.2	0	2	6.31	4

==== Relief pitchers ====
Note: G = Games pitched; W = Wins; L = Losses; SV = Saves; ERA = Earned run average; SO = Strikeouts

Player	G	W	L	SV	ERA	SO
Bob Osborn	27	6	1	0	5.01	9
Steve Swetonic	14	0	2	1	3.90	8
George Grant	11	0	0	0	7.41	6
Andy Bednar	3	0	0	0	11.25	2

== Farm system ==
Level	Team	League	Manager
A	Wichita Aviators	Western League	Art Griggs & Howie Gregory
