= Emil Planeta =

American baseball player (1909–1963)

- Pitcher
- Born: January 31, 1909; Higganum, Connecticut
- Died: February 2, 1963 (aged 54); Rocky Hill, Connecticut
- Batted: Right Threw: Right

MLB debut
- September 20, 1931, for the New York Giants

Last MLB appearance
- September 27, 1931, for the New York Giants

MLB statistics
- Games played: 2
- Innings pitched: 5.1
- Earned run average: 10.13
- Stats at Baseball Reference

Teams
- New York Giants (1931)

Emil Joseph Planeta (January 31, 1909 – February 2, 1963) was a pitcher in Major League Baseball who appeared in two games for the 1931 New York Giants.
