= Bill Cronin (baseball) =

American baseball player (1902–1966)

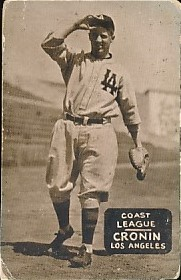
- Catcher
- Born: December 26, 1902; West Newton, Massachusetts, U.S.
- Died: October 26, 1966 (aged 63); Newton, Massachusetts, U.S.
- Batted: Right Threw: Right

MLB debut
- July 4, 1928, for the Boston Braves

Last MLB appearance
- September 21, 1931, for the Boston Braves

MLB statistics
- Batting average: .230
- Home runs: 0
- Runs batted in: 27
- Stats at Baseball Reference

Teams
- Boston Braves (1928–1931)

William Patrick Cronin (December 26, 1902 – October 26, 1966) was an American professional baseball player and manager. He played in Major League Baseball as a catcher for the Boston Braves between 1928 and 1931. He threw and batted right-handed and was listed as 5 feet 9 inches (1.75 m) tall and 167 pounds (76 kg).

== Biography ==
Nicknamed "Crungy", Cronin was born in the village of West Newton, Massachusetts, and played college baseball for Boston College. In 1923 and 1924, he played summer baseball for Falmouth of the Cape Cod Baseball League, batting .420 in 1923.

Cronin made his major league debut with the Braves in 1928. Over parts of four seasons with Boston, he collected 68 hits, including 15 doubles and two triples, in 126 games played. In 1930 and 1931, he served as the primary backup catcher to regular Al Spohrer. For most of the rest of that decade, Cronin toiled in the top-level Pacific Coast League. He became a player-manager in 1942, and skippered four minor league clubs over all or parts of four seasons.

Cronin died in his home city of Newton at the age of 63.
