= Red Worthington =

American baseball player (1906-1963)

- Left fielder
- Born: April 24, 1906; Alhambra, California, U.S.
- Died: December 8, 1963 (aged 57); Sepulveda, California, U.S.
- Batted: Right Threw: Right

MLB debut
- April 14, 1931, for the Boston Braves

Last MLB appearance
- September 14, 1934, for the St. Louis Cardinals

MLB statistics
- Batting average: .287
- Home runs: 12
- Runs batted in: 111
- Stats at Baseball Reference

Teams
- Boston Braves (1931–1934); St. Louis Cardinals (1934)

Robert Lee "Red" Worthington (April 24, 1906 – December 8, 1963) was an American professional baseball player. The outfielder, a native of Alhambra, California, appeared in 292 games and four seasons in Major League Baseball with the Boston Braves (1931–1934) and St. Louis Cardinals (1934). Worthington batted and threw right-handed, and was listed as 5 feet 11 inches (1.80 m) tall and 170 pounds (77 kg).

Worthington's 13-year professional career began in 1925. Acquired by the Cardinals' farm system in 1927, he put up three outstanding seasons in the upper levels of the minor leagues from 1928 to 1930, with seasons of 212, 202 and 175 hits, and batting averages of .352, .327 and .375; in the last of those years, 1930, he missed the batting title of the top-level International League by .001 to his Rochester teammate, Ripper Collins. Despite his minor-league production, he could not earn a roster spot on the major-league Cardinals, and his contract was sold to the Boston Braves on September 15, 1930. He was the Braves' regular left fielder in both 1931 and 1932, batting .291 and .303, and leading National League left fielders in assists in 1932, a testament to his powerful throwing arm. Then injury and illness struck: he broke his ankle while sliding on August 7, 1932, putting him out of action for the remainder of that campaign; and in 1933, vertigo limited him to only 17 games played all year. The 1934 season saw him play in only 41 games for Boston, and—after he was sold back to St. Louis in September—one game for the Cardinals. He played in the top-level Pacific Coast League for three more years, 1935–1937, before leaving the game, and after his baseball career he served in the United States Army during World War II.

In his four MLB seasons, Red Worthington batted .287 lifetime, and collected 298 hits, with 69 doubles, 18 triples and 12 home runs. He was credited with 111 runs batted in. He died in Sepulveda, California, at the age of 57.
