= Fred Bennett (baseball) =

American baseball player (1902–1957)

- Right fielder
- Born: March 15, 1902; Atkins, Arkansas, U.S.
- Died: May 12, 1957 (aged 55); Atkins, Arkansas, U.S.
- Batted: Right Threw: Right

MLB debut
- April 13, 1928, for the St. Louis Browns

Last MLB appearance
- July 28, 1931, for the Pittsburgh Pirates

MLB statistics
- Batting average: .278
- Home runs: 1
- Runs batted in: 7
- Stats at Baseball Reference

Teams
- St. Louis Browns (1928); Pittsburgh Pirates (1931)

James Fred "Red" Bennett (March 15, 1902 – May 12, 1957) was an American Major League Baseball (MLB) right fielder who played with the St. Louis Browns in 1928 and the Pittsburgh Pirates in 1931.

He made his Major League debut at the age of 26 on April 13, 1928, and played his last game on July 28, 1931.
