= Les Sweetland =

American baseball player (1901–1974)

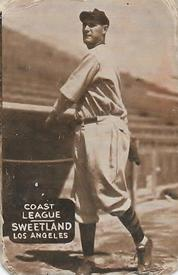
- Pitcher
- Born: August 15, 1901; St. Ignace, Michigan, U.S.
- Died: March 24, 1974 (aged 72); Melbourne, Florida, U.S.
- Batted: Right Threw: Left

MLB debut
- July 4, 1927, for the Philadelphia Phillies

Last MLB appearance
- September 21, 1931, for the Chicago Cubs

MLB statistics
- Win–loss record: 33–58
- Earned run average: 6.10
- Strikeouts: 159
- Stats at Baseball Reference

Teams
- Philadelphia Phillies (1927–1930); Chicago Cubs (1931)

Lester Leo Sweetland (August 15, 1901 – March 4, 1974) was a professional baseball pitcher in the Major Leagues from 1927 to 1931. He played for the Philadelphia Phillies and Chicago Cubs. Sweetland's 7.71 ERA in 1930 is the highest in the modern era for a full season in which the pitcher qualified for the ERA title.

After impressing scouts with a string of sturdy years in Class B baseball, the Phillies picked up Sweetland in the middle of the 1927 season. As the perennial bottom-feeders in the standings throughout the 1920s, the hard-pressed Phillies stuck with Sweetland for four seasons. However, his poor performances occasionally led to his reassignment from the rotation to the bullpen. During his tenure in Philadelphia, he posted a .329 winning percentage, a 6.33 ERA, and a 1.856 WHIP. The Cubs picked him up with high hopes for the 1931 season. Despite winning eight of his fifteen decisions, the Cubs were disappointed by Sweetland's subpar year, which ultimately led to a demotion to Chicago's farm system. Sweetland never returned to the Major Leagues.
