= Pete McClanahan =

American baseball player (1906–1987)

- Pinch hitter
- Born: October 24, 1906; Coldspring, Texas, U.S.
- Died: October 28, 1987 (aged 81); Mont Belvieu, Texas, U.S.
- Batted: Right Threw: Right

MLB debut
- April 24, 1931, for the Pittsburgh Pirates

Last MLB appearance
- May 28, 1931, for the Pittsburgh Pirates

MLB statistics
- Games played: 7
- At bats: 4
- Hits: 2
- Stats at Baseball Reference

Teams
- Pittsburgh Pirates (1931)

Robert Hugh "Pete" McClanahan (October 24, 1906 – October 28, 1987) was an American pinch hitter in Major League Baseball. He played in seven games for the Pittsburgh Pirates during the 1931 season.
