= 1931 St. Louis Cardinals season =

Major League Baseball season

1931 St. Louis Cardinals
- World Series champions National League champions
- League: National League
- Ballpark: Sportsman's Park
- City: St. Louis, Missouri
- Record: 101–53 (65.6%)
- League place: 1st place
- Owners: Sam Breadon
- General managers: Branch Rickey
- Managers: Gabby Street
- Radio: KMOX (France Laux); KWK (Thomas Patrick); WIL (Eddie Benson)

The 1931 St. Louis Cardinals season was the team's 50th season in St. Louis, Missouri and the 40th season in the National League. The Cardinals went 101 wins and 53 losses during the season and finished first in the National League. In the World Series, they beat the Philadelphia Athletics in 7 games.

== Regular season ==
Second baseman Frankie Frisch won the MVP Award this year, batting .311, with 4 home runs and 82 RBIs.

=== Season standings ===
National League
Team	W	L	Pct.	GB	Home	Road
St. Louis Cardinals	101	53	.656	—	54‍–‍24	47‍–‍29
New York Giants	87	65	.572	13	50‍–‍27	37‍–‍38
Chicago Cubs	84	70	.545	17	50‍–‍27	34‍–‍43
Brooklyn Robins	79	73	.520	21	46‍–‍29	33‍–‍44
Pittsburgh Pirates	75	79	.487	26	44‍–‍33	31‍–‍46
Philadelphia Phillies	66	88	.429	35	40‍–‍36	26‍–‍52
Boston Braves	64	90	.416	37	36‍–‍41	28‍–‍49
Cincinnati Reds	58	96	.377	43	38‍–‍39	20‍–‍57

=== Record vs. opponents ===
1931 National League record Sources:
Team	BSN	BRO	CHC	CIN	NYG	PHI	PIT	STL
Boston	—	11–11–1	8–14–1	8–14	6–16	11–11	11–11	9–13
Brooklyn	11–11–1	—	14–8	10–12	10–10	13–9	11–11	10–12
Chicago	14–8–1	8–14	—	14–8	12–10	14–8	14–8–1	8–14
Cincinnati	14–8	12–10	8–14	—	7–15	9–13	6–16	2–20
New York	16–6	10–10	10–12	15–7	—	14–8–1	12–10	10–12
Philadelphia	11–11	9–13	8–14	13–9	8–14–1	—	13–9	4–18
Pittsburgh	11–11	11–11	8–14–1	16–6	10–12	9–13	—	10–12
St. Louis	13–9	12–10	14–8	20–2	12–10	18–4	12–10	—

=== Roster ===
1931 St. Louis Cardinals
Roster
Pitchers: Paul Derringer; Burleigh Grimes; Jesse Haines; Bill Hallahan; Syl Johnson; Tony Kaufmann; Jim Lindsey; Flint Rhem; Allyn Stout	Catchers: Mike González; Gus Mancuso; Gabby Street; Jimmie Wilson; Infielders: Sparky Adams; Joe Benes; Jim Bottomley; Ripper Collins; Ray Cunningham; Eddie Delker; Jake Flowers; Frankie Frisch; Charlie Gelbert; Andy High	Outfielders: Ray Blades; Taylor Douthit; Chick Hafey; Joel Hunt; Pepper Martin; Ernie Orsatti; Wally Roettger; George Watkins	Manager: Gabby Street; Coaches: Ray Blades; Buzzy Wares

== Player stats ==
=== Batting ===
==== Starters by position ====
Note: Pos = Position; G = Games played; AB = At bats; H = Hits; Avg. = Batting average; HR = Home runs; RBI = Runs batted in

Pos	Player	G	AB	H	Avg.	HR	RBI
C	Jimmie Wilson	115	383	105	.274	0	51
1B	Jim Bottomley	108	382	133	.348	9	75
2B	Frankie Frisch	131	518	161	.311	4	82
SS	Charlie Gelbert	131	447	129	.289	1	62
3B	Sparky Adams	143	608	178	.293	1	40
OF	George Watkins	131	503	145	.288	13	51
OF	Chick Hafey	122	450	157	.349	16	95
OF	Pepper Martin	123	413	124	.300	7	75

==== Other batters ====
Note: G = Games played; AB = At bats; H = Hits; Avg. = Batting average; HR = Home runs; RBI = Runs batted in

Player	G	AB	H	Avg.	HR	RBI
Ripper Collins	89	279	84	.301	4	59
Gus Mancuso	67	187	49	.262	1	23
Ernie Orsatti	70	158	46	.291	0	19
Wally Roettger	45	151	43	.285	0	17
Jake Flowers	45	137	34	.248	2	19
Taylor Douthit	36	133	44	.331	1	21
Andy High	63	131	35	.267	0	19
Ray Blades	35	67	19	.284	1	5
Mike González	15	19	2	.105	0	3
Joe Benes	10	12	2	.167	0	0
Ray Cunningham	3	4	0	.000	0	1
Eddie Delker	1	2	1	.500	0	2
Gabby Street	1	1	0	.000	0	0
Joel Hunt	4	1	0	.000	0	0

=== Pitching ===
==== Starting pitchers ====
Note: G = Games pitched; IP = Innings pitched; W = Wins; L = Losses; ERA = Earned run average; SO = Strikeouts

Player	G	IP	W	L	ERA	SO
Bill Hallahan	37	248.2	19	9	3.29	159
Burleigh Grimes	29	212.1	17	9	3.65	67

==== Other pitchers ====
Note: G = Games pitched; IP = Innings pitched; W = Wins; L = Losses; ERA = Earned run average; SO = Strikeouts

Player	G	IP	W	L	ERA	SO
Paul Derringer	35	211.2	18	8	3.36	134
Flint Rhem	33	207.1	11	10	3.56	72
Syl Johnson	32	186.0	11	9	3.00	82
Jesse Haines	19	122.1	12	3	3.02	27

==== Relief pitchers ====
Note: G = Games pitched; W = Wins; L = Losses; SV = Saves; ERA = Earned run average; SO = Strikeouts

Player	G	W	L	SV	ERA	SO
Jim Lindsey	35	6	4	7	2.77	32
Allyn Stout	30	6	0	3	4.21	40
Tony Kaufmann	15	1	1	1	6.06	13

== 1931 World Series ==
NL St. Louis Cardinals (4) vs. AL Philadelphia Athletics (3)

Game	Score	Date	Location	Attendance
1	Athletics – 6, Cardinals – 2	October 1	Sportsman's Park	38,529
2	Athletics – 0, Cardinals – 2	October 2	Sportsman's Park	35,947
3	Cardinals – 5, Athletics – 2	October 5	Shibe Park	32,295
4	Cardinals – 0, Athletics – 3	October 6	Shibe Park	32,295
5	Cardinals – 5, Athletics – 1	October 7	Shibe Park	32,295
6	Athletics – 8, Cardinals – 1	October 9	Sportsman's Park	39,401
7	Athletics – 2, Cardinals – 4	October 10	Sportsman's Park	20,805

== Awards and honors ==
- Pepper Martin, Associated Press Athlete of the Year

=== League leaders ===
- Chick Hafey, NL Batting Champion, .349
- Bill Hallahan, NL Leader (tied), 19 Wins
- Bill Hallahan NL Leader, 159 strikeouts
- Frankie Frisch, NL Leader, 28 stolen bases

== Farm system ==
Level	Team	League	Manager
AA	Columbus Red Birds	American Association	Nemo Leibold
AA	Rochester Red Wings	International League	Billy Southworth
A	Houston Buffaloes	Texas League	Joe Schultz, Sr.
B	Elmira Colonels	New York–Pennsylvania League	Jake Pitler, Fritz Coumbe and Joe Sugden
B	Danville Veterans	Illinois–Indiana–Iowa League	Franklin Murphy
C	Scottdale Cardinals	Middle Atlantic League	Clay Hopper
C	Greensboro Patriots	Piedmont League	John Kane
C	Springfield Red Wings	Western Association	Eddie Dyer
D	Keokuk Indians	Mississippi Valley League	Bob Rice

LEAGUE CHAMPIONS: Rochester, Houston, Springfield, Keokuk
