= 1931 New York Giants (MLB) season =

1931 New York Giants
- League: National League
- Ballpark: Polo Grounds
- City: New York City
- Record: 87–65 (.572)
- League place: 2nd
- Owners: Charles Stoneham
- Managers: John McGraw

The 1931 New York Giants season was the franchise's 49th season. The team finished in second place in the National League with an 87–65 record, 13 games behind the World Champion St. Louis Cardinals. This was John McGraw's final full season as manager.

== Regular season ==
=== Season standings ===
National League
Team	W	L	Pct.	GB	Home	Road
St. Louis Cardinals	101	53	.656	—	54‍–‍24	47‍–‍29
New York Giants	87	65	.572	13	50‍–‍27	37‍–‍38
Chicago Cubs	84	70	.545	17	50‍–‍27	34‍–‍43
Brooklyn Robins	79	73	.520	21	46‍–‍29	33‍–‍44
Pittsburgh Pirates	75	79	.487	26	44‍–‍33	31‍–‍46
Philadelphia Phillies	66	88	.429	35	40‍–‍36	26‍–‍52
Boston Braves	64	90	.416	37	36‍–‍41	28‍–‍49
Cincinnati Reds	58	96	.377	43	38‍–‍39	20‍–‍57

=== Record vs. opponents ===
1931 National League record Sources:
Team	BSN	BRO	CHC	CIN	NYG	PHI	PIT	STL
Boston	—	11–11–1	8–14–1	8–14	6–16	11–11	11–11	9–13
Brooklyn	11–11–1	—	14–8	10–12	10–10	13–9	11–11	10–12
Chicago	14–8–1	8–14	—	14–8	12–10	14–8	14–8–1	8–14
Cincinnati	14–8	12–10	8–14	—	7–15	9–13	6–16	2–20
New York	16–6	10–10	10–12	15–7	—	14–8–1	12–10	10–12
Philadelphia	11–11	9–13	8–14	13–9	8–14–1	—	13–9	4–18
Pittsburgh	11–11	11–11	8–14–1	16–6	10–12	9–13	—	10–12
St. Louis	13–9	12–10	14–8	20–2	12–10	18–4	12–10	—

=== Roster ===
1931 New York Giants
Roster
Pitchers: Jack Berly; Tiny Chaplin; Pete Donohue; Freddie Fitzsimmons; Joe Heving; Carl Hubbell; Ray Lucas; Clarence Mitchell; Jim Mooney; Bill Morrell; Roy Parmelee; Emil Planeta; Hal Schumacher; Bill Walker	Catchers: Francis Healy; Shanty Hogan; Bob O'Farrell; Infielders: Hughie Critz; Gil English; Bill Hunnefield; Travis Jackson; Sam Leslie; Doc Marshall; Bill Terry; Johnny Vergez	Outfielders: Ethan Allen; Chick Fullis; Freddy Leach; Freddie Lindstrom; Jo-Jo Moore; Mel Ott	Manager: John McGraw; Coaches: Dave Bancroft; Chief Bender; George Burns; Irish Meusel

== Player stats ==
=== Batting ===
==== Starters by position ====
Note: Pos = Position; G = Games played; AB = At bats; H = Hits; Avg. = Batting average; HR = Home runs; RBI = Runs batted in

Pos	Player	G	AB	H	Avg.	HR	RBI
C	Shanty Hogan	123	396	119	.301	12	65
1B	Bill Terry	153	611	213	.349	9	112
2B	Hughie Critz	66	238	69	.290	4	17
SS	Travis Jackson	145	555	172	.310	5	71
3B	Johnny Vergez	152	565	157	.278	13	81
OF	Mel Ott	138	497	145	.292	29	115
OF	Freddie Lindstrom	78	303	91	.300	5	36
OF	Freddy Leach	129	515	159	.309	6	61

==== Other batters ====
Note: G = Games played; AB = At bats; H = Hits; Avg. = Batting average; HR = Home runs; RBI = Runs batted in

Player	G	AB	H	Avg.	HR	RBI
Chick Fullis	89	302	99	.328	3	28
Ethan Allen	94	298	98	.329	5	43
Bill Hunnefield	64	196	53	.270	1	17
Doc Marshall	68	194	39	.201	0	10
Bob O'Farrell	85	174	39	.224	1	19
Sam Leslie	53	53	16	.302	3	5
Gil English	3	8	0	.000	0	0
Jo-Jo Moore	4	8	2	.250	0	3
Francis Healy	6	7	1	.143	0	0

=== Pitching ===
==== Starting pitchers ====
Note: G = Games pitched; IP = Innings pitched; W = Wins; L = Losses; ERA = Earned run average; SO = Strikeouts

Player	G	IP	W	L	ERA	SO
Freddie Fitzsimmons	35	253.2	18	11	3.05	78
Carl Hubbell	36	248.0	14	12	2.65	155
Bill Walker	37	239.1	16	9	2.26	121
Clarence Mitchell	27	190.1	13	11	4.07	39
Jim Mooney	10	71.2	7	1	2.01	38

==== Other pitchers ====
Note: G = Games pitched; IP = Innings pitched; W = Wins; L = Losses; ERA = Earned run average; SO = Strikeouts

Player	G	IP	W	L	ERA	SO
Jack Berly	27	111.1	7	8	3.88	45
Bill Morrell	20	66.0	5	3	4.36	16
Roy Parmelee	13	58.2	2	2	3.68	30
Tiny Chaplin	16	42.1	3	0	3.19	7
Hal Schumacher	8	18.1	1	1	10.80	11
Pete Donohue	4	11.1	0	1	5.56	4

==== Relief pitchers ====
Note: G = Games pitched; W = Wins; L = Losses; SV = Saves; ERA = Earned run average; SO = Strikeouts

Player	G	W	L	SV	ERA	SO
Joe Heving	22	1	6	4	4.89	26
Emil Planeta	2	0	0	0	10.13	0
Ray Lucas	1	0	0	0	4.50	0

== Farm system ==
Level	Team	League	Manager
A	Bridgeport Bears	Eastern League	Hans Lobert
