= 1931 Cincinnati Reds season =

1931 Cincinnati Reds
- League: National League
- Ballpark: Redland Field
- City: Cincinnati
- Owners: Sidney Weil
- Managers: Dan Howley
- Radio: WFBE (Harry Hartman, Sidney Ten-Eyck)

The 1931 Cincinnati Reds season was a season in American baseball. The team finished eighth and last in the National League with a record of 58–96, 43 games behind the St. Louis Cardinals.

== Off-season ==
On November 24, the Reds were involved in a minor trade, trading infielder Pat Crawford and outfielder Marty Callaghan to the Hollywood Stars of the Pacific Coast League for first baseman Mickey Heath. Heath hit .324 with 37 home runs with the Stars in the 1930 season.

In January, the club selected infielder Clyde Beck off of waivers from the Chicago Cubs. Beck hit .213 with six home runs and 34 RBI during 83 games with Chicago in the 1930 season.

During spring training, outfielder Harry Heilmann was incapacitated due to arthritis of his wrist. He would miss the entire 1931 season due to his injury.

To off-set the loss of Heilmann, the Reds selected outfielder Cliff Heathcote off of waivers from the Chicago Cubs on March 22. Heathcote hit .260 with nine home runs and 18 RBI in 70 games with Chicago in 1930. In nine seasons with the Cubs from 1922 to 1930, he had a .280 batting average with 33 home runs and 275 RBI, while stealing 121 bases. Heathcote also played with the St. Louis Cardinals from 1918 until being traded to Chicago in 1922.

On March 26, the Reds went back to the waiver wire, selecting former Reds legend Edd Roush from the New York Giants. Roush sat out the 1930 season due to a salary dispute with the Giants. In 1929 with New York, Roush hit .324 with eight home runs and 52 RBI in 115 games. Roush played with the Reds from 1916 until 1926. During his time with Cincinnati, he led the National League in hitting in 1917 with a .341 average and in 1919 when he hit .321. In 1923, he led the NL with 43 doubles, and in 1924, he led the league with 21 triples. Roush won the 1919 World Series with the Reds, when they defeated the Chicago White Sox.

== Regular season ==
Cincinnati stumbled out of the gate, losing 12 of their first 13 games, quickly falling into last place in the National League. After a 2-17 start to the season, the Reds managed to win three games in a row, including sweeping a double header against the Philadelphia Phillies on May 15.

Wins continued to be few and far between, as the club finally won their 10th game of the season on June 3, defeating the Phillies 3-1 to improve to 10-32. This started a five game winning streak, and a nine game stretch where Cincinnati won eight games.

On June 15, the Reds traded outfielder Wally Roettger to the St. Louis Cardinals for outfielder Taylor Douthit. Douthit had a .331 average with a home run and 21 RBI in 36 games with the Cardinals during the season. In 1929 with the Cardinals, Douthit was among the National League leaders with a .336 batting average.

The club continued to struggle for wins during the rest of the season, as they never were able to climb out of the basement. Cincinnati finished the 1931 season with a league worst record of 58-96, finishing six games behind the Boston Braves for seventh place. The Reds finished 43 games behind the pennant winning St. Louis Cardinals.

The 58 wins by Cincinnati was one fewer than they had in 1930, and the lowest win total in team history since they won 52 games in 1901. The Reds last place finish was the first time the finished that low since 1914.

Third baseman Joe Stripp led the Reds with a .324 average, while hitting three home runs and 42 RBI in 105 games. First baseman Harvey Hendrick hit .315 with a home run and 75 RBI in 137 games, while leading the club with 74 runs. Second baseman Tony Cuccinello also hit .315 while two home runs and a team best 93 RBI in 154 games. Outfielder Edd Roush hit .271 with a home run and 41 RBI in 101 games in his return with the Reds. Overall, Cincinnati hit an NL low 21 home runs during the season.

On the mound, Red Lucas led the club with a 14-13 record and a 3.59 ERA in 238 innings pitched in 29 starts. Lucas had 24 complete games and three shutouts. Si Johnson had a record of 11-19, leading the NL in losses, however, he led the Reds with 262.1 innings pitched and 95 strikeouts in 42 games. Larry Benton had a team-low 3.35 ERA, while posting a 10-15 record, while pitching 204.1 innings pitched.

=== Season standings ===
National League
Team	W	L	Pct.	GB	Home	Road
St. Louis Cardinals	101	53	.656	—	54‍–‍24	47‍–‍29
New York Giants	87	65	.572	13	50‍–‍27	37‍–‍38
Chicago Cubs	84	70	.545	17	50‍–‍27	34‍–‍43
Brooklyn Robins	79	73	.520	21	46‍–‍29	33‍–‍44
Pittsburgh Pirates	75	79	.487	26	44‍–‍33	31‍–‍46
Philadelphia Phillies	66	88	.429	35	40‍–‍36	26‍–‍52
Boston Braves	64	90	.416	37	36‍–‍41	28‍–‍49
Cincinnati Reds	58	96	.377	43	38‍–‍39	20‍–‍57

=== Record vs. opponents ===
1931 National League record Sources:
Team	BSN	BRO	CHC	CIN	NYG	PHI	PIT	STL
Boston	—	11–11–1	8–14–1	8–14	6–16	11–11	11–11	9–13
Brooklyn	11–11–1	—	14–8	10–12	10–10	13–9	11–11	10–12
Chicago	14–8–1	8–14	—	14–8	12–10	14–8	14–8–1	8–14
Cincinnati	14–8	12–10	8–14	—	7–15	9–13	6–16	2–20
New York	16–6	10–10	10–12	15–7	—	14–8–1	12–10	10–12
Philadelphia	11–11	9–13	8–14	13–9	8–14–1	—	13–9	4–18
Pittsburgh	11–11	11–11	8–14–1	16–6	10–12	9–13	—	10–12
St. Louis	13–9	12–10	14–8	20–2	12–10	18–4	12–10	—

=== Roster ===
1931 Cincinnati Reds
Roster
Pitchers: Larry Benton; Ownie Carroll; Al Eckert; Benny Frey; Whitey Hilcher; Si Johnson; Ray Kolp; Red Lucas; Jack Ogden; Eppa Rixey; Ed Strelecki; Biff Wysong	Catchers: Casper Asbjornson; Lena Styles; Clyde Sukeforth; Infielders: Clyde Beck; Tony Cuccinello; Chuck Dressen; Leo Durocher; Hod Ford; Mickey Heath; Harvey Hendrick; Frank Sigafoos; Joe Stripp	Outfielders: Estel Crabtree; Nick Cullop; Taylor Douthit; Cliff Heathcote; Gene Moore; Wally Roettger; Edd Roush; Other batters: Ray Fitzgerald	Manager: Dan Howley; Coaches: Mickey Doolan

== Player stats ==
=== Batting ===
==== Starters by position ====
Note: Pos = Position; G = Games played; AB = At bats; H = Hits; Avg. = Batting average; HR = Home runs; RBI = Runs batted in

Pos	Player	G	AB	H	Avg.	HR	RBI
C	Clyde Sukeforth	112	351	90	.256	0	25
1B	Harvey Hendrick	137	530	167	.315	1	75
2B	Tony Cuccinello	154	575	181	.315	2	93
SS	Leo Durocher	121	361	82	.227	1	29
3B	Joe Stripp	105	426	138	.324	3	42
OF	Edd Roush	101	376	102	.271	1	41
OF	Taylor Douthit	95	374	98	.262	0	24
OF	Estel Crabtree	117	443	119	.269	4	37

==== Other batters ====
Note: G = Games played; AB = At bats; H = Hits; Avg. = Batting average; HR = Home runs; RBI = Runs batted in

Player	G	AB	H	Avg.	HR	RBI
Nick Cullop	104	334	88	.263	8	48
Cliff Heathcote	90	252	65	.258	0	28
Wally Roettger	44	185	65	.351	1	20
Hod Ford	84	175	40	.229	0	13
Clyde Beck	53	136	21	.154	0	19
Casper Asbjornson	45	118	36	.305	0	22
Lena Styles	34	87	21	.241	0	5
Frank Sigafoos	21	65	11	.169	0	8
Mickey Heath	7	26	7	.269	0	3
Chuck Dressen	5	15	1	.067	0	0
Gene Moore	4	14	2	.143	0	1
Ray Fitzgerald	1	1	0	.000	0	0

=== Pitching ===
==== Starting pitchers ====
Note: G = Games pitched; IP = Innings pitched; W = Wins; L = Losses; ERA = Earned run average; SO = Strikeouts

Player	G	IP	W	L	ERA	SO
Si Johnson	42	262.1	11	19	3.77	95
Red Lucas	29	238.0	14	13	3.59	56
Eppa Rixey	22	126.2	4	7	3.91	22

==== Other pitchers ====
Note: G = Games pitched; IP = Innings pitched; W = Wins; L = Losses; ERA = Earned run average; SO = Strikeouts

Player	G	IP	W	L	ERA	SO
Larry Benton	38	204.1	10	15	3.35	35
Benny Frey	34	133.2	8	12	4.92	19
Ownie Carroll	29	107.1	3	9	5.53	24
Ray Kolp	30	107.0	4	9	4.96	24
Jack Ogden	22	89.0	4	8	2.93	24
Biff Wysong	12	21.2	0	2	7.89	5
Whitey Hilcher	2	12.0	0	1	3.00	5

==== Relief pitchers ====
Note: G = Games pitched; W = Wins; L = Losses; SV = Saves; ERA = Earned run average; SO = Strikeouts

Player	G	W	L	SV	ERA	SO
Al Eckert	14	0	1	0	9.16	5
Ed Strelecki	13	0	0	0	9.25	3

== Farm system ==
Level	Team	League	Manager
B	Peoria Tractors	Illinois–Indiana–Iowa League	Chick Fraser
C	Bartlesville Broncos	Western Association	Art Ewoldt
D	Davenport Blue Sox	Mississippi Valley League	Ed Reichle and Cletus Dixon
