= Rollie Hemsley =

American baseball player (1907–1972)

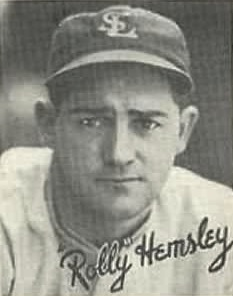
- Catcher
- Born: June 24, 1907; Syracuse, Ohio, U.S.
- Died: July 31, 1972 (aged 65); Washington, D.C., U.S.
- Batted: Right Threw: Right

MLB debut
- April 19, 1928, for the Pittsburgh Pirates

Last MLB appearance
- April 17, 1947, for the Philadelphia Phillies

MLB statistics
- Batting average: .262
- Home runs: 31
- Runs batted in: 555
- Stats at Baseball Reference

Teams
- Pittsburgh Pirates (1928–1931); Chicago Cubs (1931–1932); Cincinnati Reds (1933); St. Louis Browns (1933–1937); Cleveland Indians (1938–1941); Cincinnati Reds (1942); New York Yankees (1942–1944); Philadelphia Phillies (1946–1947)

Career highlights and awards
- 5× All-Star (1935, 1936, 1939, 1940, 1944)

Ralston Burdett Hemsley (June 24, 1907 – July 31, 1972) was an American professional baseball player. He played in Major League Baseball as a catcher for 19 seasons from 1928 to 1947. Born in Syracuse, Ohio, he was nicknamed "Rollicking Rollie". Hemsley batted and threw right-handed.

== Major league career ==
Hemsley began his major league career in 1928 for the Pittsburgh Pirates, playing 50 games. After spending his first two seasons backing up Charlie Hargreaves, he became the starting catcher for the Pirates for the 1930 season. The following season, Hemsley played 10 games before he was traded to the Chicago Cubs for Earl Grace. He spent his time as a Cub backing up Hall of Famer Gabby Hartnett, though was able to bat .309 during his tenure on the Cubs for the 1931 season. He played with the Cubs during their run to the 1932 World Series, though Hemsley ended up without a hit in three pinch hit appearances. At the end of the 1932 season, Hemsley was traded to the Cincinnati Reds along with Johnny Moore, Lance Richbourg, and Bob Smith for Babe Herman. He struggled in Cincinnati, hitting under .200 while playing under another Hall of Famer, Ernie Lombardi. On August 12, 1933, he was traded to the St. Louis Browns for Jack Crouch.

Hemsley became the starting catcher for the Browns in the 1934 season, and his best years were with the St. Louis Browns in 1934 and 1935, when he hit .309 and .290 respectively. He also hit 7 triples both years, a career high. His effort in 1935 also earned him his first spot on the All-Star team, as well as 9th place in MVP voting. He played well for two more seasons for the Browns, but a batting average of .222 in 1937, as well as a suspension for violation of team rules on July 2, 1937, led to a trade on February 10, 1938. Hemsley was traded to the Cleveland Indians for Ed Cole, Roy Hughes, and Billy Sullivan, Jr. on the recommendation of Bob Feller, who had been impressed with Hemsley's catching skills. He spent the 1938 season backing up Frankie Pytlak but, became known as Feller's personal catcher. Hemsley became the starter in 1939 after Pytlak went down with an injury, and played well enough to earn his third All-Star bid. On opening day of the 1940 season, Hemsley caught Feller's no-hitter, becoming the only catcher to catch an opening day no-hit game. He also drove in the only run of the game with a triple. His consistency in the 1940 season saw him lead the American League catchers with a .994 fielding percentage, and led to a couple MVP votes as well as his fourth All-Star appearance.

After playing another season in Cleveland, Hemsley was purchased by the Cincinnati Reds for a second stint on December 4, 1941. He was a disappointing stint with the Reds, playing 36 games and ending with a batting average of only .113, and was released by the Reds on July 17 as a result. However, two days later he was signed to a contract by the New York Yankees. His signing by the Yankees came when starter Bill Dickey went down with a shoulder injury. When Dickey's backup, Buddy Rosar, left the team without permission to take examinations to join the Buffalo police force and, to be with his wife who was about to have a baby, Yankees manager Joe McCarthy signed Hemsley to be the second string catcher, relegating Rosar to the third string position. Hemsley hit safely in his first six games as a Yankee, and raised his average back to nearly .200 by season's end. He served the 1943 season as a backup to Dickey as the Yankees won the 1943 World Series. Hemsley played well in 1944 for the Yankees. Despite only playing in 81 games that season, he received a few MVP votes and made it to his 5th All-Star game. He left the team mid-season to join the U.S. Navy. He did not play during the 1945 season but he was signed by the Philadelphia Phillies on March 25, 1946. After backing up Andy Seminick for a season, he was released, only to be re-signed again by the Phillies. He only played in two games during the 1947 season before being released and retired at the age of 40.

== Career statistics ==
In a nineteen-year major league career, Hemsley played in 1,593 games accumulating 1,321 hits in 5,047 at bats for a .262 career batting average along with 31 home runs, 555 runs batted in, a .311 on-base percentage and a .360 slugging percentage. He had a .978 career fielding percentage. Hemsley led American League catchers twice in assists, once in fielding percentage, once in baserunners caught stealing and once in range factor.

== Battle with alcoholism ==
Hemsley was known for having a drinking problem, one which caused him to be kicked off four separate clubs. Hemsley would later attend Alcoholics Anonymous meetings to help himself sober up. He revealed his membership to the press in 1940, becoming the first AA member to break their anonymity on a national level. Hemsley's anonymity break was one of the first developments to raise questions and concern about personal anonymity in the organization.

== Post-playing career ==
After retiring, Hemsley operated a real estate office in Langley Park, Maryland, was a coach for the Philadelphia Athletics (1954) and Washington Senators (1961–62) and managed in the minor leagues. He was selected Minor League Manager of the Year by The Sporting News in 1950 while serving as pilot of the Columbus Red Birds. He died of a heart attack at age 65 on July 31, 1972, in Washington, D.C.
