= Wes Schulmerich =

American baseball player (1901–1985)

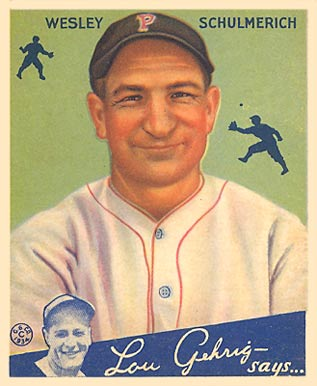
- Schulmerich 1934 Goudey card
- Outfielder
- Born: August 21, 1901; Hillsboro, Oregon, U.S.
- Died: June 26, 1985 (aged 83); Corvallis, Oregon, U.S.
- Batted: Right Threw: Right

MLB debut
- May 1, 1931, for the Boston Braves

Last MLB appearance
- September 30, 1934, for the Cincinnati Reds

MLB statistics
- Batting average: .289
- Home runs: 27
- Runs batted in: 192
- Stats at Baseball Reference

Teams
- Boston Braves (1931–1933); Philadelphia Phillies (1933–1934); Cincinnati Reds (1934)

Edward Wesley Schulmerich (August 21, 1901 – June 26, 1985) was an American Major League Baseball player from the state of Oregon. A native of the state, he played baseball and football at what is now Oregon State University where he participated in three sports. On the football team, he played three positions and earned the nickname of Ironhorse and all-conference honors. In baseball, he was a right-handed outfielder and after leaving school started his professional career in the minor leagues. Schulmerich then became the first player from the school to make it to the Major Leagues, playing for three teams in the early 1930s. He is a member of the Oregon State University Sports Hall of Fame and the Oregon Sports Hall of Fame.

== Early life ==
Edward Wesley "Wes" Schulmerich was born to German immigrants in Hillsboro, Oregon, on August 21, 1901. He was one of seven children raised on a farm near the city by his father William and mother Annie (née Schmidt). His grandfather Conrad brought the family to the United States in 1856, a family that included politician Edward Schulmerich, Wes' uncle. Wes Schulmerich went to high school in Hillsboro, a city west of Portland. After two years he dropped out of the school and worked on his father's farm.

In 1921, he enrolled at the Columbia Prep school in Portland, the predecessor to the University of Portland, a Catholic school. He had been recruited to play football for the school, and did, earning a scholarship to Oregon Agricultural College (now Oregon State University). Schulmerich had been recruited to play football at the University of Notre Dame by Knute Rockne, but declined. He graduated from Columbia Prep in 1923 and headed south to Corvallis and college. There he participated in three sports: football, baseball, and track.

Schulmerich earned the nickname of Ironhorse on the football field as he played fullback on offense, linebacker on defense, and on special teams was the placekicker. As a junior and senior he earned all-conference honors for his play on the team. On the track team he ran the 100 yard dash, clocking in at 10.5 seconds. In baseball, he played in the outfield and hit for a .459 average his senior year. Schulmerich graduated with a bachelor's degree in business in 1927 from Oregon State.

== Professional career ==
Schulmerich was recruited to play in the National Football League after leaving college, but decided to play baseball instead. He began his career playing for the Clarks in the Butte Mining League in Montana, a semi-professional league. Ralph Coleman, the Oregon State coach got him the job, along with his second job with the Los Angeles Angels of the Pacific Coast League (PCL). In 1927, he hit for a .322 average with no home runs (HRs) and 14 runs batted in (RBIs) in 31 games for the team. The next season, he hit .317 with 19 home runs and 96 RBIs in 192 games. For the 1929 season he played in 134 games at hit .328 with 19 home runs and 77 RBIs. Then in 1930 he hit .380, 28 home runs, and 130 RBIs in 189 games.

He was signed by the Chicago Cubs, but before he played for the team he was traded on October 14, 1930, to the Boston Braves along with Bill McAfee for pitcher Bob Smith and outfielder Jimmy Welsh. On May 1, 1931, Schulmerich made his Major League debut with the Boston Braves. He was the first person from Oregon State University to play in the Major Leagues. In his first season, he batted .309 with two home runs and 43 RBIs in 95 games, mainly in right field. The next season, he hit .260, and in 1933 he batted .247 in 29 games before he was traded to the Philadelphia Phillies. Schulmerich was traded on June 17 along with Fritz Knothe in exchange for outfielder Hal Lee and third baseman Pinky Whitney.

Finishing the 1933 season with the Phillies, he hit .334 with 8 home runs and 59 RBIs in 97 games. Overall that year he hit .318 for fifth best in the National League. The next year, he played 15 games for the Phillies before being traded to the Cincinnati Reds on May 16, 1934. The Phillies included outfielder Art Ruble and pitcher Ted Kleinhans in the deal to acquire fellow Oregonian Syl Johnson (a pitcher) and outfielder Johnny Moore. Schulmerich played 74 games for the Reds, batting .263 with 5 home runs and 19 RBIs. He played his last major league game on September 30, 1934. He never returned to the Major Leagues, and in 429 career games he hit 27 home runs, drove in 192 runs, and had a .289 batting average.

Schulmerich was sent to the Toronto Maple Leafs of the International League where he spent one season. Schulmerich returned to the Los Angeles Angels for the 1936 season and played in 142 games, batting .301 with 14 home runs and 85 RBIs. In 1937, he was traded to the Portland Beavers of the PCL upon his request. He played in only 19 games that year, hitting .241. Schulmerich was let go early in the season after an error cost the team a game, an error he laughed at during the play. He then signed with the Lewiston Broncos in Idaho of the Western International League as a player-manager, winning the triple crown on the field, but doing poorly as manager. After the 1937 season, the team relocated to Bellingham, Washington, and Schulmerich became just a player. Halfway through the 1938 season he was traded to Spokane in the same league where he also spent 45 games of the 1939 season. The rest of the season was spent playing in the Pioneer League for the Twin Falls Cowboys. The next year, he retired, though he did play in several games in 1941, again for Twin Falls.

== Later years and family ==
During his final years as a player, Schulmerich began acting as an on-field jester, a routine he continued for several years after retirement. In 1929, Schulmerich was married to Cecile Hobro, and they had two daughters, Betty and Cecile. After leaving baseball he worked for Shell Oil until joining the United States Navy during World War II. He served from 1942 to 1945, leaving as a lieutenant commander. Schulmerich bought property in Beaver, Oregon, in Tillamook County where he ran a fishing resort. He also became a big Oregon State University fan, never missing a home football game in 62 years.

Schulmerich served as a county commissioner in Tillamook for 11 years before moving to North Albany in 1958. He bought the Albany Golf Course that year, and sold it in 1960, using the profits to pay for retirement. In addition to OSU football games, he and his wife also attended most baseball, basketball, and track home events, as well as many road games. Schulmerich was inducted into the inaugural class of the Oregon Sports Hall of Fame in 1980 followed in 1991 by induction into OSU's Sports Hall of Fame. He was diagnosed with cancer in the late 1970s and went through chemotherapy, but never regained his health. Edward Wesley Schulmerich died in Corvallis on June 26, 1985, at the age of 83 and was buried in his hometown of Hillsboro at the Valley Memorial Mausoleum.
