= Joe Benes =

American baseball player (1901–1975)

- Infielder
- Born: January 8, 1901; Long Island City, New York, U.S.
- Died: March 7, 1975 (aged 74); Elmhurst, New York, U.S.
- Batted: Right Threw: Right

MLB debut
- May 9, 1931, for the St. Louis Cardinals

Last MLB appearance
- June 14, 1931, for the St. Louis Cardinals

MLB statistics
- Batting average: .167
- Home runs: 0
- Runs batted in: 0
- Stats at Baseball Reference

Teams
- St. Louis Cardinals (1931)

Joseph Anthony "Bananas" Benes (January 8, 1901 – March 7, 1975) was an American infielder in Major League Baseball. He played for the St. Louis Cardinals in 1931.

Branch Rickey added Benes to the Cardinals' roster in May 1931. Given that Benes was 30 years old at the time, Rickey stated that Benes was not regarded as a future prospect but as "reserve strength" to back up shortstop Charlie Gelbert. By June 17, 1931, however, he was replaced on the roster by infielder Jakie Flowers and returned to the minors.
