= 1931 Brooklyn Robins season =

1931 Brooklyn Robins
- League: National League
- Ballpark: Ebbets Field
- City: Brooklyn, New York
- Record: 79–73 (.520)
- League place: 4th
- Owners: Stephen McKeever, Brooklyn Trust Company
- President: Frank York
- Managers: Wilbert Robinson

The 1931 Brooklyn Robins finished in fourth place, after which longtime manager Wilbert Robinson announced his retirement with 1,399 career victories.

== Offseason ==
- October 14, 1930: Clise Dudley, Jumbo Elliott, Hal Lee and cash were traded by the Robins to the Philadelphia Phillies for Lefty O'Doul and Fresco Thompson.

== Regular season ==
Jack Quinn became the oldest person in baseball history to pitch on Opening Day. He was 47 when he started for Brooklyn on Opening Day in 1931. It would be Quinn's only start of the season, as he pitched the rest of the year in relief.

=== Season standings ===
National League
Team	W	L	Pct.	GB	Home	Road
St. Louis Cardinals	101	53	.656	—	54‍–‍24	47‍–‍29
New York Giants	87	65	.572	13	50‍–‍27	37‍–‍38
Chicago Cubs	84	70	.545	17	50‍–‍27	34‍–‍43
Brooklyn Robins	79	73	.520	21	46‍–‍29	33‍–‍44
Pittsburgh Pirates	75	79	.487	26	44‍–‍33	31‍–‍46
Philadelphia Phillies	66	88	.429	35	40‍–‍36	26‍–‍52
Boston Braves	64	90	.416	37	36‍–‍41	28‍–‍49
Cincinnati Reds	58	96	.377	43	38‍–‍39	20‍–‍57

=== Record vs. opponents ===
1931 National League record Sources:
Team	BSN	BRO	CHC	CIN	NYG	PHI	PIT	STL
Boston	—	11–11–1	8–14–1	8–14	6–16	11–11	11–11	9–13
Brooklyn	11–11–1	—	14–8	10–12	10–10	13–9	11–11	10–12
Chicago	14–8–1	8–14	—	14–8	12–10	14–8	14–8–1	8–14
Cincinnati	14–8	12–10	8–14	—	7–15	9–13	6–16	2–20
New York	16–6	10–10	10–12	15–7	—	14–8–1	12–10	10–12
Philadelphia	11–11	9–13	8–14	13–9	8–14–1	—	13–9	4–18
Pittsburgh	11–11	11–11	8–14–1	16–6	10–12	9–13	—	10–12
St. Louis	13–9	12–10	14–8	20–2	12–10	18–4	12–10	—

=== Notable transactions ===
- May 7, 1931: Harvey Hendrick was traded by the Robins to the Cincinnati Reds for Mickey Heath.
- May 23, 1931: Ray Moss was purchased from the Robins by the Boston Braves.

=== Roster ===
1931 Brooklyn Robins
Roster
Pitchers: Watty Clark; Pea Ridge Day; Phil Gallivan; Fred Heimach; Dolf Luque; Earl Mattingly; Cy Moore; Ray Moss; Van Mungo; Ray Phelps; Jack Quinn; Joe Shaute; Sloppy Thurston; Dazzy Vance	Catchers: Ernie Lombardi; Al López; Val Picinich; Infielders: Del Bissonette; Neal Finn; Jake Flowers; Wally Gilbert; Bobby Reis; Gordon Slade; Fresco Thompson; Jack Warner; Glenn Wright	Outfielders: Rube Bressler; Alta Cohen; Johnny Frederick; Babe Herman; Lefty O'Doul; Max Rosenfeld; Denny Sothern; Other batters: Ike Boone; Harvey Hendrick	Manager: Wilbert Robinson; Coaches: Jimmy Johnston; Otto Miller; Ivy Olson

== Player stats ==
=== Batting ===
==== Starters by position ====
Note: Pos = Position; G = Games played; AB = At bats; R = Runs; H = Hits; Avg. = Batting average; HR = Home runs; RBI = Runs batted in; SB = Stolen bases

Pos	Player	G	AB	R	H	Avg.	HR	RBI	SB
C	Al López	112	360	38	97	.269	0	40	1
1B	Del Bissonette	152	587	90	170	.290	12	87	4
2B	Neal Finn	118	413	46	113	.274	0	45	2
3B	Wally Gilbert	145	552	60	147	.266	0	46	3
SS	Gordon Slade	85	272	27	65	.239	1	29	2
LF	Lefty O'Doul	134	512	85	172	.336	7	75	5
CF	Johnny Frederick	146	611	81	165	.270	17	71	2
RF	Babe Herman	151	610	93	191	.313	18	97	17

==== Other batters ====
Note: G = Games played; AB = At bats; R = Runs; H = Hits; Avg. = Batting average; HR = Home runs; RBI = Runs batted in; SB = Stolen bases

Player	G	AB	R	H	Avg.	HR	RBI	SB
Glenn Wright	77	268	36	76	.284	9	32	1
Ernie Lombardi	73	182	20	54	.297	4	23	1
Fresco Thompson	74	181	26	48	.265	1	21	5
Rube Bressler	67	153	22	43	.281	0	26	0
Val Picinich	24	45	5	12	.267	1	4	1
Jake Flowers	22	31	3	7	.226	0	1	1
Denny Sothern	19	31	10	5	.161	0	0	0
Bobby Reis	6	17	3	5	.294	0	2	0
Max Rosenfeld	3	9	0	2	.222	0	0	0
Ike Boone	6	5	0	1	.200	0	0	0
Jack Warner	9	4	2	2	.500	0	0	0
Alta Cohen	1	3	1	2	.667	0	0	0
Harvey Hendrick	1	1	0	0	.000	0	0	0

=== Pitching ===
==== Starting pitchers ====
Note: G = Games pitched; GS = Games started; CG = Complete games; IP = Innings pitched; W = Wins; L = Losses; ERA = Earned run average; BB = Bases on balls; SO = Strikeouts

Player	G	GS	CG	IP	W	L	ERA	BB	SO
Watty Clark	34	28	16	233.1	14	10	3.20	52	96
Dazzy Vance	30	29	12	218.2	11	13	3.38	53	150
Ray Phelps	28	26	3	149.1	7	9	5.00	44	50
Sloppy Thurston	24	17	11	143.0	9	9	3.97	39	23
Joe Shaute	25	19	6	128.2	11	8	4.83	32	50
Dolf Luque	19	15	5	102.2	7	6	4.56	27	25
Van Mungo	5	4	2	31.0	3	1	2.32	13	12

==== Other pitchers ====
Note: G = Games pitched; GS = Games started; CG = Complete games; IP = Innings pitched; W = Wins; L = Losses; ERA = Earned run average; BB = Bases on balls; SO = Strikeouts

Player	G	GS	CG	IP	W	L	ERA	BB	SO
Fred Heimach	31	10	7	135.1	9	7	3.46	23	43
Phil Gallivan	6	1	0	15.1	0	1	5.28	7	1

==== Relief pitchers ====
Note: G = Games pitched; IP = Innings pitched; W = Wins; L = Losses; SV = Saves; ERA = Earned run average; BB = Bases on balls; SO = Strikeouts

Player	G	IP	W	L	SV	ERA	BB	SO
Jack Quinn	39	64.1	5	4	15	2.66	24	25
Cy Moore	23	61.2	1	2	0	3.79	13	35
Pea Ridge Day	22	57.1	2	2	1	4.55	13	30
Earl Mattingly	8	14.1	0	1	0	2.51	10	6
Ray Moss	1	1.0	0	0	0	0.00	1	0

== Awards and honors ==
=== League top five finishers ===
Babe Herman

- #2 in NL in stolen bases (17)

Dazzy Vance

- #3 in NL in strikeouts (150)
