= Ray Fitzgerald (baseball) =

American baseball player (1904–1977)

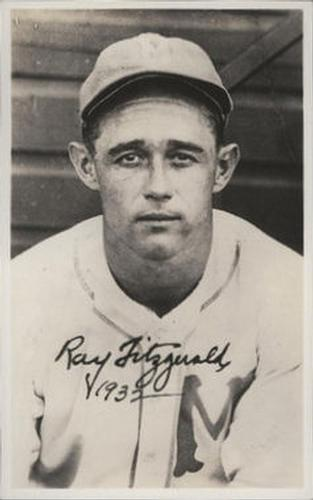
- Pinch hitter
- Born: December 5, 1904; Chicopee, Massachusetts, U.S.
- Died: September 6, 1977 (aged 72); Westfield, Massachusetts, U.S.
- Batted: Right Threw: Right

MLB debut
- April 18, 1931, for the Cincinnati Reds

Last MLB appearance
- April 18, 1931, for the Cincinnati Reds

MLB statistics
- Games played: 1
- At bats: 1
- Hits: 0
- Stats at Baseball Reference

Teams
- Cincinnati Reds (1931)

Raymond Francis Fitzgerald (December 5, 1904 – September 6, 1977) was an American professional baseball player. An outfielder who batted from the right side and threw with his right hand, Fitzgerald had a listed height of 5 ft 9 in (1.75 m) and a listed weight of 168 pounds (76 kg).

Fitzgerald played in only one game in the major leagues, appearing as a pinch hitter for the Cincinnati Reds on April 18, 1931, in a 9–6 loss to the Pittsburgh Pirates. He was active for several years in the minor leagues, however, with clubs such as the Toronto Maple Leafs.
