= Billy Kinloch =

American baseball player (1874–1931)

- Third baseman
- Born: March 21, 1874; Providence, Rhode Island, U.S.
- Died: February 15, 1931 (aged 56); New York City, New York, U.S.
- Batted: Unknown Threw: Unknown

MLB debut
- August 1, 1895, for the St. Louis Browns

Last MLB appearance
- August 1, 1895, for the St. Louis Browns

MLB statistics
- Batting average: .333
- At bats: 3
- Hits: 1
- Stats at Baseball Reference

Teams
- St. Louis Browns (1895)

William Francis Kinloch (March 21, 1874 – February 15 1931) was an American Major League Baseball player. He played one game at third base for the 1895 St. Louis Browns. He was born on March 21, 1874, in Providence, Rhode Island, and he died on February 15, 1931, in New York City. He is buried at the Calvary Cemetery in Woodside, New York. He played his first game at the age of 21 years.
