= Don Minnick =

American baseball player (1931–2016)

- Pitcher
- Born: April 14, 1931; Lynchburg, Virginia, U.S.
- Died: September 2, 2016 (aged 85); Rocky Mount, Virginia, U.S.
- Batted: Right Threw: Right

MLB debut
- September 23, 1957, for the Washington Senators

Last MLB appearance
- September 28, 1957, for the Washington Senators

MLB statistics
- Win–loss record: 0–1
- Earned run average: 4.82
- Strikeouts: 7
- Stats at Baseball Reference

Teams
- Washington Senators (1957)

Donald Athey Minnick (April 14, 1931 – September 2, 2016) was an American professional baseball pitcher who played in two Major League Baseball (MLB) games for the Washington Senators in 1957. A right-hander, Minnick was listed as 6 feet 3 inches (1.91 m) tall and 195 pounds (88 kg).

Born in Lynchburg, Virginia, Minnick began his professional career in the Cleveland Indians' organization in 1949. He missed the 1952 and 1953 minor-league seasons performing United States Army service during the Korean War. He also attended Duke University.

When he returned to baseball, he posted back-to-back strong seasons (earned run averages of 2.88 and 2.78) in the Eastern League, including a 20–4 won–lost record in 1955. But after a poor 1956 campaign in higher-classification leagues, Cleveland released him. The Senators picked him up and sent him to Double-A Chattanooga for 1957. Minnick made the Southern Association All-Star team during a season in which he won 17 games and lost 6, with a 3.09 ERA.

Recalled by Washington in September, Minnick's debut came in relief on the 23rd against the Boston Red Sox at Griffith Stadium. He entered the game in the sixth inning with Washington trailing 9–3, and Minnick retired six of the seven batters he faced, issuing only a base on balls to Hall of Famer Ted Williams. He was rewarded with a start five days later against the Baltimore Orioles, again at Griffith Stadium. Minnick struggled in the first inning, allowing a three-run home run to Gus Triandos. But he held Baltimore to those three runs for the next six innings, allowing only two hits. But in the eighth, Baltimore pulled away to an 8–1 lead, scoring five runs (though only two were earned) off Minnick. The Senators eventually fell 9–1, with Minnick taking the loss.

It was his last MLB opportunity. Minnick pitched into 1959 in the Washington organization. In Minnick's two MLB games, he posted an 0–1 (4.82) record, permitting 14 hits and two bases on balls, with seven strikeouts, in 91/3 innings pitched. After baseball, Minnick and his wife, Helen, settled in Rocky Mount, Virginia, where he operated a trucking company and they raised their family. He died in 2016, aged 85.
