= Gair Allie =

American baseball player (1931–2016)

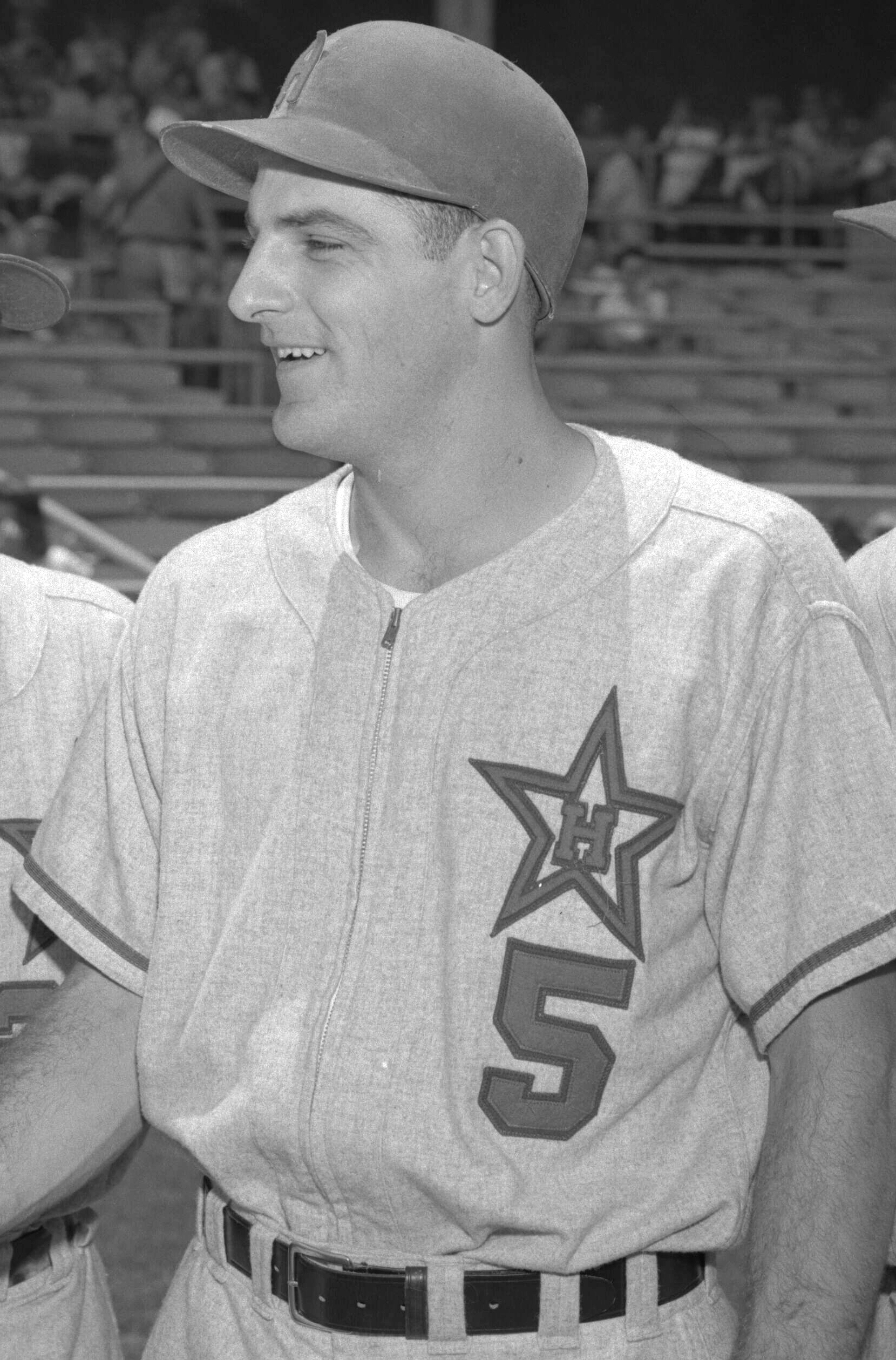
- Allie with the Hollywood Stars in 1956
- Infielder
- Born: October 28, 1931; Statesville, North Carolina, U.S.
- Died: October 4, 2016 (aged 84); San Antonio, Texas, U.S.
- Batted: Right Threw: Right

MLB debut
- April 13, 1954, for the Pittsburgh Pirates

Last MLB appearance
- September 26, 1954, for the Pittsburgh Pirates

MLB statistics
- Batting average: .199
- Hits: 83
- Runs batted in: 30
- Stats at Baseball Reference

Teams
- Pittsburgh Pirates (1954)

Gair Roosevelt Allie (October 28, 1931 – October 4, 2016) was an American professional baseball player. A shortstop and third baseman born in Statesville, North Carolina, he played professional baseball between 1952 and 1961, including 121 games in Major League Baseball for the 1954 Pittsburgh Pirates. Allie threw and batted right-handed, stood 6 feet 1 inch (1.85 m) tall and weighed 190 pounds (86 kg).

Allie was born in 1931 in Statesville, North Carolina, and attended Statesville High School and Wake Forest University. He played baseball for the Wake Forest frosh team in the spring of 1951.

During the summer of 1951, at age 19, Allie played semi-pro baseball for Whiteville in the Eastern North Carolina League and for Stellarton, Nova Scotia in a Canadian league. While playing in Canada, Allie compiled a .400 batting average and led the league with 19 home runs.

In September 1951, Allie signed a contract with the Pittsburgh Pirates and was paid a $20,000 bonus. He was assigned to the Double-A New Orleans Pelicans where he played during the 1952 and 1953 seasons. He was expected to land a spot with the Pirates in 1953, but he sustained a fracture of his right ankle while playing in Cuba during the off-season. As a result of the fracture, Allie was limited to 32 games with the Pelicans in 1953.

After two seasons at New Orleans, Allie spent the entire 1954 National League season with the Pirates, starting 92 games at shortstop while incumbent Dick Groat was serving in the military. Allie also started 18 games at third base. He collected 83 hits, including eight doubles, six triples and three home runs, batting .199 with 30 runs batted in.

He returned to New Orleans in 1955 and spent the rest of his baseball career in the minor leagues, retiring in 1961.

Gair Allie died in San Antonio, Texas, at the age of 84.
