= Bud Teachout =

American baseball player (1904–1985)

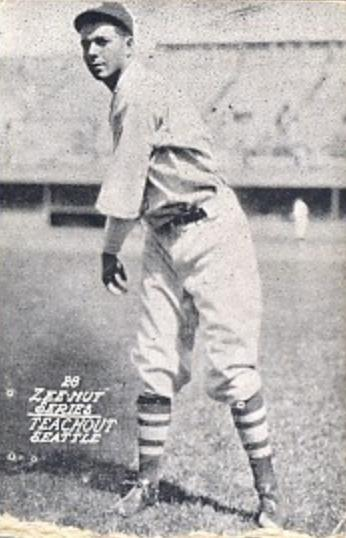
- Pitcher
- Born: February 27, 1904; Los Angeles, California, U.S.
- Died: May 11, 1985 (aged 81); Laguna Beach, California, U.S.
- Batted: Right Threw: Left

MLB debut
- May 12, 1930, for the Chicago Cubs

Last MLB appearance
- April 15, 1932, for the St.Louis Cardinals

MLB statistics
- Win–loss record: 12-6
- Earned run average: 4.51
- Strikeouts: 73
- Stats at Baseball Reference

Teams
- Chicago Cubs (1930–1931); St.Louis Cardinals (1932)

Arthur John "Bud" Teachout (February 27, 1904 – May 11, 1985) was an American pitcher in Major League Baseball. He played for the Chicago Cubs and St.Louis Cardinals.
