= Earl Mattingly =

American baseball player (1904-1993)

- Pitcher
- Born: November 4, 1904; Newport, Maryland, U.S.
- Died: September 8, 1993 (aged 88); Brookeville, Maryland, U.S.
- Batted: Right Threw: Right

MLB debut
- April 15, 1931, for the Brooklyn Robins

Last MLB appearance
- June 9, 1931, for the Brooklyn Robins

MLB statistics
- Win–loss record: 0-1
- Earned run average: 3.82
- Strikeouts: 6
- Stats at Baseball Reference

Teams
- Brooklyn Robins (1931)

Laurence Earl Mattingly (November 4, 1904 – September 8, 1993) was an American professional baseball pitcher in Major League Baseball. He pitched in eight games for the 1931 Brooklyn Robins.
