= Bill Hunnefield =

American baseball player (1899–1976)

- Infielder
- Born: January 5, 1899; Dedham, Massachusetts, U.S.
- Died: August 28, 1976 (aged 77); Nantucket, Massachusetts, U.S.
- Batted: Switch Threw: Right

MLB debut
- April 17, 1926, for the Chicago White Sox

Last MLB appearance
- September 27, 1931, for the New York Giants

MLB statistics
- Batting average: .272
- Home runs: 9
- Runs batted in: 144
- Stats at Baseball Reference

Teams
- Chicago White Sox (1926–1930); Cleveland Indians (1931); Boston Braves (1931); New York Giants (1931)

William Fenton Hunnefield (January 5, 1899 – August 28, 1976) was an American Major League Baseball infielder. He was a switch hitter, threw with his right hand, was 5 ft 10 in (1.78 m) tall, and weighed 165 pounds (75 kg).

== Baseball career ==
Hunnefield was a member of the Massachusetts state champion baseball team from Framingham High School in 1916 (as reported in the Middlesex News on February 14, 1993), and graduated from Framingham High in 1918.

Hunnefield attended Northeastern University, where he played on the baseball team. He was an infielder who played for the Chicago White Sox and Cleveland Indians of the American League and the Boston Braves and New York Giants of the National League in a six-season career from 1926 to 1931.

Playing in a total of 511 games, his batting average was .272 and his fielding percentage was .944. He finished second in the league in stolen bases in 1926. He played on the winning side in two no-hitters: Ted Lyons (1926) and Wes Ferrell (1931).

There is a vintage "exhibit" card issued in 1927 that pictures Chicago White Sox pitcher Tommy Thomas, and was mislabeled as "Wm. Hunnefield". Bill Hunnefield does appear in a 1993 baseball card set created from photo archives of the Sporting News on card #696.

After his major league career, he was a manager in the semi-pro Boston Parks League in the early 1940s.

In the off-season, Hunnefield was an accountant and often reported late to spring training because it coincided with tax season.

In the late 1940s he moved to New York City with his wife, Jean Nathan, where they founded the Jean Nate company. They operated this company successfully until its sale in 1963 to Lanvin.
