= 1931 Philadelphia Phillies season =

Major League Baseball season

1931 Philadelphia Phillies
- League: National League
- Ballpark: Baker Bowl
- City: Philadelphia, Pennsylvania
- Owners: Charlie Ruch
- Managers: Burt Shotton

The following lists the events of the 1931 Philadelphia Phillies season.

== Offseason ==
- November 6, 1930: Tommy Thevenow and Claude Willoughby were traded by the Phillies to the Pittsburgh Pirates for Dick Bartell.

== Regular season ==
=== Season standings ===
National League
| Team | W | L | Pct. | GB | Home | Road |
|---|---|---|---|---|---|---|
| St. Louis Cardinals | 101 | 53 | .656 | — | 54‍–‍24 | 47‍–‍29 |
| New York Giants | 87 | 65 | .572 | 13 | 50‍–‍27 | 37‍–‍38 |
| Chicago Cubs | 84 | 70 | .545 | 17 | 50‍–‍27 | 34‍–‍43 |
| Brooklyn Robins | 79 | 73 | .520 | 21 | 46‍–‍29 | 33‍–‍44 |
| Pittsburgh Pirates | 75 | 79 | .487 | 26 | 44‍–‍33 | 31‍–‍46 |
| Philadelphia Phillies | 66 | 88 | .429 | 35 | 40‍–‍36 | 26‍–‍52 |
| Boston Braves | 64 | 90 | .416 | 37 | 36‍–‍41 | 28‍–‍49 |
| Cincinnati Reds | 58 | 96 | .377 | 43 | 38‍–‍39 | 20‍–‍57 |

=== Record vs. opponents ===
1931 National League record Sources:
| Team | BSN | BRO | CHC | CIN | NYG | PHI | PIT | STL |
|---|---|---|---|---|---|---|---|---|
| Boston | — | 11–11–1 | 8–14–1 | 8–14 | 6–16 | 11–11 | 11–11 | 9–13 |
| Brooklyn | 11–11–1 | — | 14–8 | 10–12 | 10–10 | 13–9 | 11–11 | 10–12 |
| Chicago | 14–8–1 | 8–14 | — | 14–8 | 12–10 | 14–8 | 14–8–1 | 8–14 |
| Cincinnati | 14–8 | 12–10 | 8–14 | — | 7–15 | 9–13 | 6–16 | 2–20 |
| New York | 16–6 | 10–10 | 10–12 | 15–7 | — | 14–8–1 | 12–10 | 10–12 |
| Philadelphia | 11–11 | 9–13 | 8–14 | 13–9 | 8–14–1 | — | 13–9 | 4–18 |
| Pittsburgh | 11–11 | 11–11 | 8–14–1 | 16–6 | 10–12 | 9–13 | — | 10–12 |
| St. Louis | 13–9 | 12–10 | 14–8 | 20–2 | 12–10 | 18–4 | 12–10 | — |

=== Roster ===
1931 Philadelphia Phillies
Roster
| Pitchers: Bob Adams; Ray Benge; Sheriff Blake; Stew Bolen; Phil Collins; Clise Dudley; Hal Elliott; Jumbo Elliott; Ed Fallenstein; John Milligan; Chet Nichols; Dutch Schesler; Ben Shields; Lil Stoner; Frank Watt; Hal Wiltse | Catchers: Gene Connell; Spud Davis; Harry McCurdy; Tony Rensa; Infielders: Dick Bartell; Bernie Friberg; Don Hurst; Les Mallon; Bobby Stevens; Pinky Whitney; Hugh Willingham | Outfielders: Buzz Arlett; Fred Brickell; Chuck Klein; Fred Koster; Hal Lee; Doug Taitt | Manager: Burt Shotton; Coaches: Fred Hunter; Jack Onslow |

== Player stats ==
=== Batting ===
==== Starters by position ====
Note: Pos = Position; G = Games played; AB = At bats; H = Hits; Avg. = Batting average; HR = Home runs; RBI = Runs batted in

| Pos | Player | G | AB | H | Avg. | HR | RBI |
|---|---|---|---|---|---|---|---|
| C | Spud Davis | 120 | 393 | 128 | .326 | 4 | 51 |
| 1B | Don Hurst | 137 | 489 | 149 | .305 | 11 | 91 |
| 2B | Les Mallon | 122 | 375 | 116 | .309 | 1 | 45 |
| SS | Dick Bartell | 135 | 554 | 160 | .289 | 0 | 34 |
| 3B | Pinky Whitney | 130 | 501 | 144 | .287 | 9 | 74 |
| OF | Buzz Arlett | 121 | 418 | 131 | .313 | 18 | 72 |
| OF | Fred Brickell | 130 | 514 | 130 | .253 | 1 | 31 |
| OF | Chuck Klein | 148 | 594 | 200 | .337 | 31 | 121 |

==== Other batters ====
Note: G = Games played; AB = At bats; H = Hits; Avg. = Batting average; HR = Home runs; RBI = Runs batted in

| Player | G | AB | H | Avg. | HR | RBI |
|---|---|---|---|---|---|---|
| Bernie Friberg | 103 | 353 | 92 | .261 | 1 | 26 |
| Fred Koster | 76 | 151 | 34 | .225 | 0 | 8 |
| Doug Taitt | 38 | 151 | 34 | .225 | 1 | 15 |
| Harry McCurdy | 66 | 150 | 43 | .287 | 1 | 25 |
| Hal Lee | 44 | 131 | 29 | .221 | 2 | 12 |
| Bobby Stevens | 12 | 35 | 12 | .343 | 0 | 4 |
| Hugh Willingham | 23 | 35 | 9 | .257 | 1 | 3 |
| Tony Rensa | 19 | 29 | 3 | .103 | 0 | 2 |
| Gene Connell | 6 | 12 | 3 | .250 | 0 | 0 |

=== Pitching ===
==== Starting pitchers ====
Note: G = Games pitched; IP = Innings pitched; W = Wins; L = Losses; ERA = Earned run average; SO = Strikeouts

| Player | G | IP | W | L | ERA | SO |
|---|---|---|---|---|---|---|
| Jumbo Elliott | 52 | 249.0 | 19 | 14 | 4.27 | 99 |
| Ray Benge | 38 | 247.0 | 14 | 18 | 3.17 | 117 |
| Phil Collins | 42 | 240.1 | 12 | 16 | 3.86 | 73 |
| Clise Dudley | 30 | 179.0 | 8 | 14 | 3.52 | 50 |
| Bob Adams | 1 | 6.0 | 0 | 1 | 9.00 | 3 |

==== Other pitchers ====
Note: G = Games pitched; IP = Innings pitched; W = Wins; L = Losses; ERA = Earned run average; SO = Strikeouts

| Player | G | IP | W | L | ERA | SO |
|---|---|---|---|---|---|---|
| Frank Watt | 38 | 122.2 | 5 | 5 | 4.84 | 25 |
| Stew Bolen | 28 | 98.2 | 3 | 12 | 6.39 | 55 |
| Sheriff Blake | 14 | 71.0 | 4 | 5 | 5.58 | 31 |
| Hal Elliott | 16 | 33.0 | 0 | 2 | 9.55 | 8 |
| Lil Stoner | 7 | 13.2 | 0 | 0 | 6.59 | 2 |

==== Relief pitchers ====
Note: G = Games pitched; W = Wins; L = Losses; SV = Saves; ERA = Earned run average; SO = Strikeouts

| Player | G | W | L | SV | ERA | SO |
|---|---|---|---|---|---|---|
| Ed Fallenstein | 24 | 0 | 0 | 0 | 7.13 | 15 |
| Dutch Schesler | 17 | 0 | 0 | 0 | 7.28 | 14 |
| Ben Shields | 4 | 1 | 0 | 0 | 15.19 | 0 |
| John Milligan | 3 | 0 | 0 | 0 | 3.38 | 6 |
| Chet Nichols Sr. | 3 | 0 | 1 | 0 | 9.53 | 1 |
| Hal Wiltse | 1 | 0 | 0 | 0 | 9.00 | 0 |
