= Bill Dreesen =

American baseball player (1904-1971)

- Third baseman
- Born: July 26, 1904; New York City
- Died: November 9, 1971 (aged 67); Mount Vernon, New York
- Batted: Left Threw: Right

MLB debut
- May 1, 1931, for the Boston Braves

Last MLB appearance
- June 29, 1931, for the Boston Braves

MLB statistics
- Batting average: .222
- Home runs: 1
- Runs batted in: 10
- Stats at Baseball Reference

Teams
- Boston Braves (1931)

William Richard Dreesen (July 26, 1904 – November 9, 1971) was a third baseman in Major League Baseball. He played for the Boston Braves in 1931.
