= Gene Snyder (baseball) =

American baseball player (1931–1996)

- Pitcher
- Born: March 31, 1931; York, Pennsylvania, U.S.
- Died: June 2, 1996 (aged 65); York, Pennsylvania, U.S.
- Batted: Right Threw: Left

MLB debut
- April 26, 1959, for the Los Angeles Dodgers

Last MLB appearance
- July 14, 1959, for the Los Angeles Dodgers

MLB statistics
- Record: 1-1
- Earned run average: 5.47
- Strikeouts: 20
- Stats at Baseball Reference

Teams
- Los Angeles Dodgers (1959)

Gene Walter Snyder (March 31, 1931 – June 2, 1996) was an American professional baseball player, a left-handed pitcher who appeared in 11 games for the Los Angeles Dodgers of Major League Baseball during the 1959 season. A native of York, Pennsylvania, Snyder was listed as 5 feet 11 inches (1.80 m) tall and 175 pounds (79 kg).

Snyder entered baseball in 1950 as a member of the Philadelphia Phillies' organization; his career interrupted by military service during the Korean War, he never played for the Phillies. But at the end of the 1958 minor-league season, he was traded to the Dodgers along with fellow pitcher Jim Golden and veteran outfielder Rip Repulski for Sparky Anderson, the future Hall-of-Fame manager, who was then a young second baseman in the Dodger farm system.

Snyder gained a spot on the 1959 Dodgers' roster and pitched sporadically during the season's first four months. After winning his debut game with 32/3 innings of relief against the St. Louis Cardinals in a wild 17–11 Dodger triumph on April 26 at Busch Stadium, he was given two starting assignments by Dodger manager Walter Alston.

On May 2, against the Cincinnati Reds at Crosley Field, Snyder hurled two scoreless innings before being driven from the mound in the fourth, when the Reds erupted for seven runs. Snyder took the loss in a 16–4 Cincinnati rout. Four days later, against the Milwaukee Braves at County Stadium, Snyder was far more effective; despite issuing five bases on balls, he allowed only one unearned run in five innings pitched and exited with a 4–1 lead. But he was denied his second major-league victory when the Dodger bullpen faltered and allowed the Braves to come back to win, 5–4. Milwaukee and Los Angeles would finish in a dead heat at the end of the year, necessitating a three-game tie-breaker series to determine the National League champion.

The Dodgers would win that tie-breaker and the 1959 World Series championship, but Snyder's last appearance for them happened July 14, when he was touched for three earned runs in only one-third of an inning in a 9–1 loss to the Pittsburgh Pirates. He worked in nine games for the Triple-A Spokane Indians in 1959, then spent three more years in the minor leagues before retiring after the 1962 season.

In his 11 big-league games, Snyder posted a 1–1 record and an earned run average of 5.47. In 261/3 innings pitched, he allowed 32 hits and 20 bases on balls, with 20 strikeouts. He finished two games without earning a save.
