= Jimmy Welsh =

American baseball player (1902-1970)

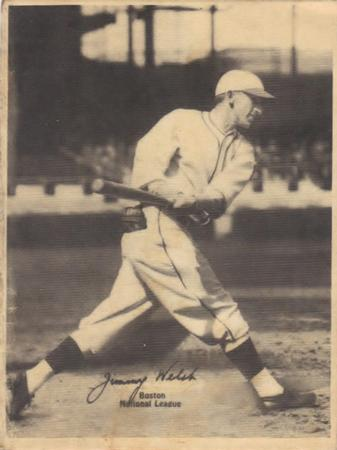
- Outfielder
- Born: October 9, 1902; Denver, Colorado, U.S.
- Died: October 20, 1970 (aged 68); Oakland, California, U.S.
- Batted: Left Threw: Right

MLB debut
- April 14, 1925, for the Boston Braves

Last MLB appearance
- September 28, 1930, for the Boston Braves

MLB statistics
- Batting average: .290
- Home runs: 35
- Runs batted in: 288
- Stats at Baseball Reference

Teams
- Boston Braves (1925–1927); New York Giants (1928–1929); Boston Braves (1929–1930)

James Daniel Welsh (October 9, 1902 – October 20, 1970), was a Major League Baseball player who played outfield from 1925-1930. Welsh played for the Boston Braves and New York Giants.

Welsh was traded, along with Shanty Hogan from the Braves to the Giants on January 10, 1928 for future Hall Of Famer Rogers Hornsby. The Giants would send Welsh back to the Braves the following year in exchange for Doc Farrell.

In 715 games over 6 seasons, Welsh posted a .290 batting average (778-for-2684) with 387 runs, 35 home runs, and 288 RBI. He finished his career with a .971 fielding percentage, having played all three outfield positions and a few games at first and second base.
