= 1931 Major League Baseball season =

1931 MLB season
- League: American League (AL); National League (NL)
- Sport: Baseball
- Duration: Regular season: April 14 – September 27, 1931; World Series: October 1–10, 1931
- Games: 154
- Teams: 16 (8 per league)

Regular season
- Season MVP: AL: Lefty Grove (PHA); NL: Frankie Frisch (STL)
- AL champions: Philadelphia Athletics
- AL runners-up: New York Yankees
- NL champions: St. Louis Cardinals
- NL runners-up: New York Giants

World Series
- Champions: St. Louis Cardinals
- Runners-up: Philadelphia Athletics

MLB seasons
- ← 1930 1932 →

Locations of teams for the 1923–1931 American League seasons
American League
Locations of teams for the 1920–1931 National League seasons
National League

The 1931 major league baseball season began on April 14, 1931. The regular season ended on September 27, with the St. Louis Cardinals and Philadelphia Athletics as the regular season champions of the National League and American League, respectively. The postseason began with Game 1 of the 28th World Series on October 1 and ended with Game 7 on October 10. In the second iteration of this World Series matchup (and a rematch of the previous year), the Cardinals defeated the Athletics, four games to three, capturing their second championship in franchise history, since their previous in 1926. Going into the season, the defending World Series champions were the Philadelphia Athletics from the 1930 season.

This was the first season that the Baseball Writers' Association of America (BBWAA) selected a Most Valuable Player in each league.

== Schedule ==
The 1931 schedule consisted of 154 games for all teams in the American League and National League, each of which had eight teams. Each team was scheduled to play 22 games against the other seven teams of their respective league. This continued the format put in place since the 1904 season (except for 1919) and would be used until 1961 in the American League and 1962 in the National League.

Opening Day, April 14, featured all sixteen teams, the first time since the 1926 season. The final day of the regular season was on September 27, which also saw all sixteen teams play on the final day continuing the trend which began the previous season. This was the first time that both Opening Day and the final day of the season saw all sixteen teams play. The World Series took place between October 1 and October 10.

== Rule changes ==
The 1931 season saw the following rule changes:

- The rule previously implemented in 1926, that a sacrifice hit was awarded when any base runner advanced on a fly out, was eliminated.
- Regulations referring to a batter contacting his own ball were clarified as was the area of bases awarded a batter when a defensive player threw his glove at a batted or thrown ball or in the case of spectator interference.
- In the National League:
  - The ground rule double rule was implemented, which states that balls that bounce over the fence entitle the batter to two bases. The rule was previously implemented by the American League in 1929.
  - Barnstorming rules were loosened, allowing a squad of players to go to Japan.
  - A rule that only people in uniform be allowed on the playing field after ballpark gates were open was approved.
- The American League adopted the early-1920 rule that when calling home runs, balls are to be called based on where the ball crosses the outfield fence, no matter if the ball lands in the stands or leaves the ballpark. The National League previously implemented this rule in 1929.

== Teams ==
An asterisk (*) denotes the ballpark a team played the minority of their home games at

League	Team	City	Ballpark	Capacity	Manager
American League	Boston Red Sox	Boston, Massachusetts	Fenway Park	27,000	Shano Collins
American League	Boston Red Sox	Boston, Massachusetts	Braves Field*	46,500*	Shano Collins
American League	Chicago White Sox	Chicago, Illinois	Comiskey Park	52,000	Donie Bush
American League	Cleveland Indians	Cleveland, Ohio	League Park	21,414	Roger Peckinpaugh
American League	Detroit Tigers	Detroit, Michigan	Navin Field	30,000	Bucky Harris
American League	New York Yankees	New York, New York	Yankee Stadium	62,000	Joe McCarthy
American League	Philadelphia Athletics	Philadelphia, Pennsylvania	Shibe Park	33,000	Connie Mack
American League	St. Louis Browns	St. Louis, Missouri	Sportsman's Park	34,023	Bill Killefer
American League	Washington Senators	Washington, D.C.	Griffith Stadium	27,000	Walter Johnson
National League	Boston Braves	Boston, Massachusetts	Braves Field	46,500	Bill McKechnie
National League	Brooklyn Robins	New York, New York	Ebbets Field	28,000	Wilbert Robinson
National League	Chicago Cubs	Chicago, Illinois	Wrigley Field	40,000	Rogers Hornsby
National League	Cincinnati Reds	Cincinnati, Ohio	Redland Field	26,060	Dan Howley
National League	New York Giants	New York, New York	Polo Grounds	56,000	John McGraw
National League	Philadelphia Phillies	Philadelphia, Pennsylvania	Baker Bowl	18,800	Burt Shotton
National League	Pittsburgh Pirates	Pittsburgh, Pennsylvania	Forbes Field	41,000	Jewel Ens
National League	St. Louis Cardinals	St. Louis, Missouri	Sportsman's Park	34,023	Gabby Street

== Standings ==
=== American League ===
American League
Team	W	L	Pct.	GB	Home	Road
Philadelphia Athletics	107	45	.704	—	60‍–‍15	47‍–‍30
New York Yankees	94	59	.614	13½	51‍–‍25	43‍–‍34
Washington Senators	92	62	.597	16	55‍–‍22	37‍–‍40
Cleveland Indians	78	76	.506	30	45‍–‍31	33‍–‍45
St. Louis Browns	63	91	.409	45	39‍–‍38	24‍–‍53
Boston Red Sox	62	90	.408	45	39‍–‍40	23‍–‍50
Detroit Tigers	61	93	.396	47	36‍–‍41	25‍–‍52
Chicago White Sox	56	97	.366	51½	31‍–‍45	25‍–‍52

=== National League ===
National League
Team	W	L	Pct.	GB	Home	Road
St. Louis Cardinals	101	53	.656	—	54‍–‍24	47‍–‍29
New York Giants	87	65	.572	13	50‍–‍27	37‍–‍38
Chicago Cubs	84	70	.545	17	50‍–‍27	34‍–‍43
Brooklyn Robins	79	73	.520	21	46‍–‍29	33‍–‍44
Pittsburgh Pirates	75	79	.487	26	44‍–‍33	31‍–‍46
Philadelphia Phillies	66	88	.429	35	40‍–‍36	26‍–‍52
Boston Braves	64	90	.416	37	36‍–‍41	28‍–‍49
Cincinnati Reds	58	96	.377	43	38‍–‍39	20‍–‍57

=== Tie games ===
9 tie games (5 in AL, 4 in NL), which are not factored into winning percentage or games behind (and were often replayed again) occurred throughout the season.

==== American League ====
- Boston Red Sox, 1
- Chicago White Sox, 3
- Cleveland Indians, 1
- New York Yankees, 2
- Philadelphia Athletics, 1
- Washington Senators, 2

==== National League ====
- Boston Braves, 2
- Brooklyn Robins, 1
- Chicago Cubs, 2
- New York Giants, 1
- Philadelphia Phillies, 1
- Pittsburgh Pirates, 1

== Postseason ==
The postseason began on October 1 and ended on October 10 with the St. Louis Cardinals defeating the Philadelphia Athletics in the 1931 World Series in seven games.

=== Bracket ===
World Series
AL	Philadelphia Athletics	3
NL	St. Louis Cardinals	4

== Managerial changes ==
=== Off-season ===
Team	Former Manager	New Manager
Boston Red Sox	Heinie Wagner	Shano Collins
New York Yankees	Bob Shawkey	Joe McCarthy

== League leaders ==
=== American League ===
Hitting leaders
Stat	Player	Total
AVG	Al Simmons (PHA)	.390
OPS	Babe Ruth (NYY)	1.195
HR	Lou Gehrig (NYY); Babe Ruth (NYY)	46
RBI	Lou Gehrig (NYY)	185
R	Lou Gehrig (NYY)	163
H	Lou Gehrig (NYY)	211
SB	Ben Chapman (NYY)	61

Pitching leaders
Stat	Player	Total
W	Lefty Grove^{1} (PHA)	31
L	Pat Caraway (CWS); Sam Gray (SLB)	24
ERA	Lefty Grove^{1} (PHA)	2.06
K	Lefty Grove^{1} (PHA)	175
IP	Rube Walberg (PHA)	291.0
SV	Firpo Marberry (WSH); Wilcy Moore (BOS)	8
WHIP	Lefty Grove (PHA)	1.077

^{1} American League Triple Crown pitching winner

=== National League ===
Hitting leaders
Stat	Player	Total
AVG	Chick Hafey (STL)	.349
OPS	Rogers Hornsby (CHC)	.996
HR	Chuck Klein (PHI)	31
RBI	Chuck Klein (PHI)	121
R	Chuck Klein (PHI); Bill Terry (NYG)	121
H	Lloyd Waner (PIT)	214
SB	Frankie Frisch (STL)	28

Pitching leaders
Stat	Player	Total
W	Jumbo Elliott (PHI); Bill Hallahan (STL); Heinie Meine (PIT)	19
L	Si Johnson (CIN)	19
ERA	Bill Walker (NYG)	2.26
K	Bill Hallahan (STL)	159
IP	Heinie Meine (PIT)	284.0
SV	Jack Quinn (BRO)	13
WHIP	Carl Hubbell (NYG)	1.121

== Milestones ==
=== Batters ===
==== Cycles ====
- Babe Herman (BRO):
  - Herman hit for his first cycle and third in franchise history, on May 18 against the Cincinnati Reds.
  - Herman hit for his second cycle and fourth in franchise history, on July 24 against the Pittsburgh Pirates. He is the third player in major league history to hit two in one season.
- Chuck Klein (PHI):
  - Klein hit for his first cycle and fourth in franchise history, on July 1 against the Chicago Cubs.

==== Other batting accomplishments ====
- Babe Ruth (NYY):
  - Became the first player in Major League history to hit 600 home runs on August 21 against the St. Louis Browns.
- Lou Gehrig (NYY):
  - Tied a Major League record by becoming the third player and second American League player to hit home runs in six consecutive games between August 28 and September 1.

=== Pitchers ===
==== No-hitters ====
- Wes Ferrell (CLE):
  - Ferrell threw his first career no-hitter and the fifth no-hitter in franchise history, by defeating the St. Louis Browns 9–0 on April 29. Ferrell walked three and struck out eight.
- Bobby Burke (WSH):
  - Burke threw his first career no-hitter and the second no-hitter in franchise history, by defeating the Boston Red Sox 5–0 on August 8. Burke walked five and struck out eight.

== Awards and honors ==
=== Regular season ===
Baseball Writers' Association of America Awards
BBWAA Award	National League	American League
Most Valuable Player	Frankie Frisch (STL)	Lefty Grove (PHA)

The Sporting News Awards
Award	National League	American League
Most Valuable Player	Chuck Klein (PHI)	Lou Gehrig (NYY)

== Home field attendance ==
Team name	Wins	%±	Home attendance	%±	Per game
Chicago Cubs	84	−6.7%	1,086,422	−25.8%	14,109
New York Yankees	94	9.3%	912,437	−22.0%	11,850
New York Giants	87	0.0%	812,163	−6.5%	10,412
Brooklyn Robins	79	−8.1%	753,133	−31.4%	9,910
Philadelphia Athletics	107	4.9%	627,464	−13.1%	8,366
St. Louis Cardinals	101	9.8%	608,535	19.7%	7,802
Boston Braves	64	−8.6%	515,005	10.8%	6,603
Washington Senators	92	−2.1%	492,657	−19.8%	6,236
Cleveland Indians	78	−3.7%	483,027	−8.6%	6,356
Detroit Tigers	61	−18.7%	434,056	−33.2%	5,637
Chicago White Sox	56	−9.7%	403,550	−0.6%	5,241
Boston Red Sox	62	19.2%	350,975	−21.0%	4,387
Philadelphia Phillies	66	26.9%	284,849	−4.7%	3,748
Cincinnati Reds	58	−1.7%	263,316	−31.9%	3,420
Pittsburgh Pirates	75	−6.3%	260,392	−27.2%	3,338
St. Louis Browns	63	−1.6%	179,126	17.8%	2,326

== Venues ==
Across 80 homes games, the Boston Red Sox played all 15 of their Sunday games at the Boston Braves home field of Braves Field (the remaining 65 home games were played at Fenway Park). This was the last of three consecutive seasons playing all Sunday games at Braves Field and 3rd of four consecutive season playing some games at Braves Field.

This was the last of 31 consecutive seasons that the Cleveland Indians played at their inaugural field, League Park (they would play full seasons at the Park in 1934 and 1935, while 1932, and 1936 to 1946 saw home games split with Cleveland Stadium.

== See also ==
- 1931 in baseball (Events, Births, Deaths)
