= 1934 in baseball =

The following are the baseball events of the year 1934 throughout the world.

== Champions ==
=== Major League Baseball ===
- World Series: St. Louis Cardinals over Detroit Tigers (4–3)
- All-Star Game, July 10 at Polo Grounds: American League, 9–7

=== Other champions ===
- Negro League Baseball All-Star Game: East, 1–0

== Awards and honors ==
- Most Valuable Player:
  - American League: Mickey Cochrane, Detroit Tigers, C
  - National League: Dizzy Dean, St. Louis Cardinals, P

== Statistical leaders ==
	American League		National League		Negro National League	
Stat	Player	Total	Player	Total	Player	Total
AVG	Lou Gehrig^{1} (NYY)	.363	Paul Waner (PIT)	.362	Buddy Burbage (ND)	.438
HR	Lou Gehrig^{1} (NYY)	49	Ripper Collins (STL); Mel Ott (NYG)	35	Josh Gibson (PC)	15
RBI	Lou Gehrig^{1} (NYY)	166	Mel Ott (NYG)	135	Josh Gibson (PC)	59
W	Lefty Gomez^{2} (NYY)	26	Dizzy Dean (STL)	30	Slim Jones^{3} (PHS)	20
ERA	Lefty Gomez^{2} (NYY)	2.33	Carl Hubbell (NYG)	2.30	Slim Jones^{3} (PHS)	1.29
K	Lefty Gomez^{2} (NYY)	158	Dizzy Dean (STL)	195	Slim Jones^{3} (PHS)	164

^{1} American League Triple Crown batting winner
^{2} American League Triple Crown pitching winner
^{3} Negro National League Triple Crown pitching winner

== Major league baseball final standings ==
=== American League final standings ===
American League
Team	W	L	Pct.	GB	Home	Road
Detroit Tigers	101	53	.656	—	54‍–‍26	47‍–‍27
New York Yankees	94	60	.610	7	53‍–‍24	41‍–‍36
Cleveland Indians	85	69	.552	16	47‍–‍31	38‍–‍38
Boston Red Sox	76	76	.500	24	42‍–‍35	34‍–‍41
Philadelphia Athletics	68	82	.453	31	34‍–‍40	34‍–‍42
St. Louis Browns	67	85	.441	33	36‍–‍39	31‍–‍46
Washington Senators	66	86	.434	34	34‍–‍40	32‍–‍46
Chicago White Sox	53	99	.349	47	29‍–‍46	24‍–‍53

Locations of teams for the 1934–1939 American League seasons
American League

=== National League final standings ===
National League
Team	W	L	Pct.	GB	Home	Road
St. Louis Cardinals	95	58	.621	—	48‍–‍29	47‍–‍29
New York Giants	93	60	.608	2	49‍–‍26	44‍–‍34
Chicago Cubs	86	65	.570	8	47‍–‍30	39‍–‍35
Boston Braves	78	73	.517	16	40‍–‍35	38‍–‍38
Pittsburgh Pirates	74	76	.493	19½	45‍–‍32	29‍–‍44
Brooklyn Dodgers	71	81	.467	23½	43‍–‍33	28‍–‍48
Philadelphia Phillies	56	93	.376	37	35‍–‍36	21‍–‍57
Cincinnati Reds	52	99	.344	42	30‍–‍47	22‍–‍52

Locations of teams for the 1932–1935 National League seasons
National League

== Negro leagues final standings ==
All Negro leagues standings below are per Seamheads.

=== Negro National League final standings ===
vs. Negro National League						vs. Major Black teams			
Negro National League	W	L	T	Pct.	GB	W	L	T	Pct.
^{(2)} Philadelphia Stars	30	13	1	.693	—	50	26	3	.652
^{(1)} Chicago American Giants	29	16	2	.638	2	37	26	3	.583
Pittsburgh Crawfords	32	20	1	.613	2½	53	29	3	.641
Newark Dodgers	13	14	1	.482	9	19	19	1	.500
Nashville Elite Giants	16	21	1	.434	11	23	33	1	.412
Baltimore Black Sox	2	7	0	.222	11	4	9	2	.333
Philadelphia Bacharach Giants	3	12	0	.200	13	5	21	0	.192
Cleveland Red Sox	3	25	0	.107	19½	4	27	0	.129

^{(1)} First half champion ^{(2)} Second half champion

==== Post-season ====
- Chicago won the first half, Philadelphia won the second half.
- Philadelphia beat Chicago 4 games to 3 games (1 tie) in a play-off.
Locations of teams for the 1934 Negro National League season
Negro National League

=== Independent teams final standings ===
A loose confederation of teams existed that were not part of the Negro National League.

vs. All Teams
Independent Clubs	W	L	T	Pct.	GB
Homestead Grays	17	13	1	.565	—
New York Black Yankees	12	15	0	.444	3½
Cuban Stars (East)	3	6	0	.333	3½
Kansas City Monarchs	3	6	0	.333	3½

== Events ==
=== January–June ===
- January 19 – Baseball commissioner Kenesaw Mountain Landis denies Shoeless Joe Jackson's appeal for reinstatement. Jackson was one of eight Chicago White Sox players banned for their part in throwing the 1919 World Series against the Cincinnati Reds.
- February 5 – Hank Aaron is born in Mobile, Alabama. Aaron will later set a major league record 755 home runs.
- April 5 – New Reds owner Powel Crosley, for whom the Cincinnati park was renamed Crosley Field, hires Red Barber to broadcast the Reds' games on WSAI, a radio station owned by Crosley.
- April 8 – In front of 15,000 fans, the Philadelphia Phillies defeat the Philadelphia A's 8–1. What made this inter-city exhibition game significant is that it is the first major league game of any kind to take place on a Sunday.
- April 17 – Opening day:
  - Casey Stengel makes his Major League managerial debut, as his Brooklyn Dodgers lose to the Boston Braves, 8–7 at Ebbets Field.
  - Lon Warneke of the Chicago Cubs throws first of two consecutive complete game one-hit victories, defeating the Cincinnati Reds, 6–0. Warneke will throw his second consecutive one-hit victory on April 22, defeating Dizzy Dean and the St. Louis Cardinals, 15–2.
- April 18 – Paul Dean, younger brother of Dizzy Dean, makes his major league debut on the mound for the St. Louis Cardinals, while allowing four earned runs in just two innings.
- April 22 – Moe Berg's American League record of 117 consecutive errorless games for a catcher, dating back to 1931, comes to an end. Nevertheless, Berg bats three-for-four to lead the Washington Senators to a victory over the Philadelphia Athletics, 4–3.
- April 29 – The Pittsburgh Pirates defeat the Cincinnati Reds 9–5 at Forbes Field, in the team's first ever Sunday home game after Pennsylvania's "Blue Law" prohibiting games on Sundays was repealed.
- May 25 – The Cleveland Indians trade Wes Ferrell and Dick Porter to the Boston Red Sox in exchange for Bob Seeds, Bob Weiland and $25,000.
- June 3 – In the sixth inning with two outs, the St. Louis Browns string together nine consecutive hits to beat the first place Cleveland Indians, 12–8.
- June 6 – Myril Hoag of the New York Yankees hits six singles against the Boston Red Sox.
- June 9 – In the eighth inning of their game against the Boston Red Sox, the Washington Senators hit 5 consecutive doubles – the most ever hit consecutively in an inning.

=== July–September ===
- July 4 – The Pittsburgh Crawfords' Satchel Paige pitches a 4–0 no-hitter against the Homestead Grays in Pittsburgh, then drove to Chicago to shut out the Chicago American Giants 1–0 in twelve innings, giving him two shutouts in two different cities on the same day.
- July 6 – Jocko Conlan makes his major league debut in right field for the Chicago White Sox. After two seasons as a part-time player with the White Sox, Conlan retires in order to pursue a career as an umpire.
- July 8 – In the course of the Philadelphia Athletics–Boston Red Sox game, Athletics player Bob Johnson hits a fly ball off Red Sox pitcher Hank Johnson, which is caught by center fielder Roy Johnson
- July 10 – At the All-Star Game held at the Polo Grounds in New York City, New York Giants pitcher Carl Hubbell strikes out five consecutive American League batters: Babe Ruth, Lou Gehrig, Jimmie Foxx, Al Simmons, and Joe Cronin, all future Hall-of-Famers. The American League defeated the National League, however, 9–7.
- July 13 – Babe Ruth founds the 700 home run club. He will be the only member for almost 40 years.
- August 4 – Already up 10–4 in the second game of a double header, the New York Giants score eleven runs in the ninth inning.
- August 14 – The Detroit Tigers sweep the New York Yankees in a double header to bring their winning streak to fourteen games. The Yankees beat them the following day to end the streak.
- September 16 – In the first game of a double header with the Brooklyn Dodgers, Phil Cavarretta makes his major league debut for the Chicago Cubs at barely eighteen years old. He strikes out in one at-bat as a pinch hitter.
- September 21 – St. Louis Cardinals pitcher Dizzy Dean throws a three hitter in the first game of a doubleheader against the Brooklyn Dodgers. In the nightcap, his younger brother Paul no-hits them.
- September 23 – With a 2½ games lead in the National League, the New York Giants lose the second game of a double header to the Boston Braves. The Giants lose their last five games of the season, to end two games back of the St. Louis Cardinals, who win their last four.
- September 26 – The Detroit Tigers sweep a double header from the Chicago White Sox, giving Chicago ten losses in a row, and 97 losses for the season. The White Sox, however, go 2–2 in their final four games to avoid 100 losses for the season.
- September 30 – Dizzy Dean of the St. Louis Cardinals shuts out the Cincinnati Reds, 9–0, to reach his 30th win of the season.

=== October–December ===
- October 3 – Sloppy play by the Detroit Tigers (five errors) helps the Cardinals cruise to an 8–3 victory in game one of the 1934 World Series.
- October 4 – Goose Goslin's single in the twelfth wins it, as the Tigers take game two, 3–2.
- October 5 – With two outs in the ninth inning, Paul Dean allows the Detroit Tigers their only run of the game. The Cards take a 2–1 series advantage with both wins come with one of the Dean brothers on the mound.
- October 6 – This time it is the Cardinals who commit five errors in one game, two of which came in the Tigers' five run eighth inning, as Detroit wins game four, 10–4.
- October 7 – The Detroit Tigers take game five of the World Series, 3–1. Dizzy Dean in the losing pitcher.
- October 8 – Daffy Dean pitches nine innings, and again just gives up one earned run. Sloppy play, however, allows the Tigers to plate two more. Dean helps his own cause with a single in the seventh to drive in the game-winning run as the Cardinals win 4–3 to even up the series.
- October 9 – The St. Louis Cardinals defeat the Detroit Tigers, 11–0, in Game seven of the World Series to win their third World Championship, four games to three. All four games are won by one of the Dean brothers (Dizzy is 2–1, Paul is 2–0). The St. Louis "Gashouse Gang" collected 73 hits in the series.
- November 21 – The New York Yankees acquire Joe DiMaggio from San Francisco of the Pacific Coast League.
- December 26 – Matsutaro Shoriki, head of Yomiuri Shimbun, announces the formation of the first professional baseball team in Japan, the Yomiuri Giants. The team is composed primarily of players who had played the American All-Stars who had toured Japan.

== Births ==
=== January ===
- January 8 – Gene Freese
- January 16 – Jim Owens
- January 20 – Camilo Pascual
- January 23 – Joey Amalfitano
- January 24 – John Briggs
- January 25 – Ted Kazanski
- January 28 – Bill White

=== February ===
- February 1 – Bob Conley
- February 3 – Noboru Akiyama
- February 5 – Hank Aaron
- February 9 – Ted Wills
- February 16 – Don Eaddy
- February 17 – Willie Kirkland
- February 22 – Sparky Anderson
- February 25 – Johnny Schaive
- February 26 – Don Lee

=== March ===
- March 3 – Bobby Locke
- March 8:
  - Marv Breeding
  - Willard Hunter
- March 9 – Jim Landis
- March 10 – Ken MacKenzie
- March 18 – Charley Pride

=== April ===
- April 1 – Rod Kanehl
- April 8 – Turk Farrell
- April 10 – Wes Stock
- April 14 – Marty Keough
- April 15 – J. C. Hartman
- April 18 – Deacon Jones
- April 26 – Mary Weddle
- April 28 – Jackie Brandt
- April 29 – Luis Aparicio
- April 30 – Ken Retzer

=== May ===
- May 3 – Chuck Hinton
- May 4 – Barbara Gates
- May 5 – Don Buddin
- May 6:
  - Tom Baker
  - Leo Burke
- May 12 – Louise Clapp
- May 13:
  - Arlene Buszka
  - Don LeJohn
  - Leon Wagner
- May 15 – Bill Conlin
- May 21 – Moe Thacker
- May 22:
  - Arlene Kotil
  - José Valdivielso
- May 26 – Jim Mahoney
- May 27 – Ray Daviault
- May 28 – Bob Smith

=== June ===
- June 3 – Jim Gentile
- June 8 – Bill Smith
- June 10 – Gloria Schweigerdt
- June 16 – Pancho Herrera
- June 22 – Russ Snyder
- June 27 – Ed Hobaugh
- June 29 – Duane Wilson

=== July ===
- July 5 – Gordy Coleman
- July 11 – Bob Allison
- July 13 – Ken Hunt
- July 19 – Bill Kirk
- July 22 – R. C. Stevens
- July 29 – Félix Mantilla
- July 30 – Bud Selig

=== August ===
- August 4 – Dallas Green
- August 9 – Eli Grba
- August 15 – Seth Morehead
- August 18:
  - Roberto Clemente
  - Billy Consolo
- August 22 – Angelo Dagres
- August 23 – Johnny Romano
- August 25 – Ralph Mauriello
- August 26 – Mary Froning
- August 27 – Em Lindbeck
- August 28 – Shirley Crites

=== September ===
- September 2 – Margaret Jurgensmeier
- September 6 – Tom Flanigan
- September 10 – Roger Maris
- September 11 – Marlan Coughtry
- September 12 – Albie Pearson
- September 13 – Tom Hughes
- September 14 – Bob Perry
- September 18 – Marilyn Jenkins
- September 21 – Jerry Zimmerman
- September 22 – Lou Johnson

=== October ===
- October 1 – Chuck Hiller
- October 2 – Earl Wilson
- October 4 – Don Bradey
- October 7 – Sammy Drake
- October 8 – Mickey Harrington
- October 14 – Tom Cheney
- October 26 – Barbara Galdonik
- October 31 – Carl Boles

=== November ===
- November 1 – Howie Goss
- November 10 – Norm Cash
- November 25 – Cholly Naranjo
- November 30 – Steve Hamilton

=== December ===
- December 2 – Andre Rodgers
- December 6 – Dan Dobbek
- December 11 – Lee Maye
- December 16 – Jim Bailey
- December 17 – Kent Hadley
- December 19 – Al Kaline
- December 25 – Charlie Beamon
- December 29 – Ramón Conde

== Deaths ==
=== January ===
- January 9 – Perry Werden, 68, first baseman who played for the St. Louis Maroons, Washington Nationals, Toledo Maumees, Baltimore Orioles, St. Louis Browns and Louisville Colonels in parts of seven seasons spanning 1884–1897.
- January 16 – Wiley Dunham, 56, pitcher for the 1902 St. Louis Cardinals.
- January 28 – John Kane, 51, outfielder who played with the Cincinnati Reds in 1907 and the Chicago Cubs in 1910.
- January 29 – Bill Schenck, 79, infielder who played for the Louisville Eclipse, Richmond Virginians and Brooklyn Grays in a span of three seasons from 1882 to 1885.
- January 30 – Frank McGee, 34, first baseman who played two games for the 1925 Washington Senators.

=== February ===
- February 8 – Tom Sexton, 68, shortstop for the 1884 Milwaukee Brewers.
- February 12 – Rowdy Elliott, 43, catcher who spent 23 years in baseball between 1907 and 1929, which included stints in the majors with the Boston Doves (1910), Chicago Cubs (1916–1918) and Brooklyn Robins (1920), being also a World War I veteran.
- February 20 – George Mappes, 68, backup catcher and second baseman who played from 1885 to 1886 for the Baltimore Orioles and the St. Louis Maroons.
- February 21:
  - Doc Adkins, 61, pitcher who played with the Boston Americans in 1902 and the New York Highlanders in 1903.
- February 25 – John McGraw, 60, Hall of Fame manager who from 1902 through 1932 led the New York Giants to three World Series championships, 10 National League pennants, and 21 first-or second-place finishes, whose 2,763 managerial victories rank him third only to Connie Mack's career-best total of 3,731 and Tony La Russa; previously he was the star third baseman of the 1890s Baltimore Orioles, batting .336 in 848 games and playing on three NL pennant-winning clubs between 1892 and 1899.
- February 27 – Frank Shannon, 60, shortstop who played with the Washington Senators in 1892 and the Louisville Colonels in 1896.
- February 28 – John Irwin, 72, third baseman who played for the Worcester Ruby Legs, Boston Reds, Philadelphia Athletics, Washington Nationals, Buffalo Bisons, Boston Reds and Louisville Colonels in parts of eight seasons spanning 1882–1891.

=== March ===
- March 3 – Mike O'Rourke, 65, pitcher for the Baltimore Orioles during the 1890 season.
- March 7 – Bill Rotes, 62, pitcher for the Louisville Colonels in 1893.
- March 9 – Dan Dugdale, 69, catcher who played with the Kansas City Cowboys in 1886 and the Washington Senators in 1894.
- March 13 – Fielder Jones, 62, center fielder and manager; played for Brooklyn Superbas (1896–1900), including 1899–1900 National League champs, and Chicago White Sox (1901–1908), including 1901 and 1906 American League pennant-winners; as manager, guided the 1906 "Hitless Wonders" White Sox to World Series title; batted over .300 in six seasons and collected 683 victories as a manager of White Sox, St. Louis Terriers (Federal League), and St. Louis Browns over ten seasons spanning 1904 to 1918.
- March 16 – Adrian Lynch, 37, pitcher for the St. Louis Browns in the 1920 season.
- March 19 – Ray Jansen, 45, third baseman who played with the St. Louis Browns in 1910.
- March 20 – Herm Doscher, 81, third baseman for five teams between 1872 and 1882, who also umpired during five seasons in the National League and the American Association.
- March 21 – Pea Ridge Day, 34, pitcher who played from 1924 through 1926 for the St. Louis Cardinals and the Cincinnati Reds, and with the Brooklyn Robins in the 1931 season.
- March 28 – Ed Larkin, 48, catcher for the 1909 Philadelphia Athletics.

=== April ===
- April 1 – Barney Gilligan, 78, catcher who played from 1879 through 1888 for the Cleveland Blues, Providence Grays, Washington Nationals and Detroit Wolverines.
- April 2 – John Roach, 66, pitcher for the 1887 New York Giants.
- April 4 – Dick Johnston, 70, center fielder who played eight seasons from 1884 to 1891, while appearing for five different teams in three different leagues, which included stints with the Richmond Virginians, Boston Beaneaters, Boston Reds, New York Giants and Cincinnati Kelly's Killers.
- April 10 – Bill Hunter, 46, outfielder who played with the Cleveland Naps in the 1912 season.
- April 11 – Charles Moran, 55, backup infielder who played from 1903 through 1905 for the Washington Senators and St. Louis Browns.
- April 19 – Charlie Hickman, 57, valuable utility and smart bases runner who played for nine different clubs in the American and National leagues from 1897 to 1908, amassing 91 career triples and several inside-the-park home runs, while leading the AL with 193 hits and 288 total bases in the 1902 season.
- April 22 – Gus Creely, 63, shortstop who played for the St. Louis Browns during the 1890 season.
- April 27 – Joe Vila, 67, journalist and editor for Boston and New York newspapers, who has been regarded as one of the most influential sportswriters during the first third of the 20th century, while setting fundamental changes in sports coverage during the decades to come.

=== May ===
- May 3 – Lew Graulich, 70, minor league first baseman.
- May 10 – Ed Willett, 50, pitcher for the Detroit Tigers from 1906 through 1913, who posted a 21–10 record and a 2.34 ERA to lead Detroit to the 1909 American League pennant, pitching later for the St. Louis Terriers of the outlaw Federal League in 1914 and 1915.
- May 14 – Lou Criger, 62, the first Opening Day catcher in Boston American League franchise's history, who was behind plate for most of Cy Young's 511 victories, and also caught every inning of eight games in the first-ever World Series in 1903, helping Boston win the championship.
- May 18 – Jumbo McGinnis, 80, ace pitcher for the original St. Louis Brown Stockings from 1882 to 1886, who hurled for them over 350 innings and averaged 26 wins in three consecutives seasons, while leading the American Association with six shutouts in 1883.

=== June ===
- June 2 – James Pirie, 81, shortstop for the 1883 Philadelphia Quakers.
- June 9 – Charlie Dexter, 57, catcher who played from 1896 through 1903 for the Louisville Colonels, Chicago Orphans and Boston Beaneaters.
- June 10 – Les German, 65, pitcher who played with the Baltimore Orioles, New York Giants and Washington Senators, in all or part of six seasons spanning 1890–1896.
- June 11 – Tim Manning, 80, second baseman who played for the Providence Grays and the Baltimore Orioles from 1882 to 1885.
- June 21 – Monte Cross, 64, slick shortstop and speedy base runner during 15 seasons for five different franchises in the National and American leagues between 1892 and 1907, who played mostly for the Philadelphia Athletics and Phillies clubs from 1897 through 1907, earning six titles in putouts and three in assists while amassing a career 328 stolen bases.
- June 29 – Charles Somers, 65, founding member of the American League in 1901 and also its principal financier, who owned the Cleveland Indians and also helped the junior circuit establish clubs in the cities of Boston, Chicago and Philadelphia.

=== July ===
- July 6 – Ray Francis, 41, left-hander who pitched for the 1922 Washington Senators and the 1923 Detroit Tigers, and for the New York Yankees and Boston Red Sox in the 1925 season.
- July 18 – Sy Sanborn, 67, sportswriter for the Chicago Tribune from 1900 to 1920 and one of the founding members of the Baseball Writers' Association of America in 1908, who later collaborated for several years for The Sporting News.
- July 19 – Ed Hutchinson, 67, second baseman for the Chicago Colts in the 1890 season.
- July 29:
  - Walt McCredie, 57, outfielder for the 1903 Brooklyn Superbas of the National League, who later played and managed in the minor leagues for many years, leading his Portland team to Pacific Coast League pennants in 1906, 1910, 1911, 1913, and 1914.
  - Dan Phelan, 81, first baseman who played for the Louisville Colonels of the American Association in 1890.

=== August ===
- August 2 – Reggie Richter, 45, German pitcher for the Chicago Cubs in the 1911 season, who also spent four seasons in the minors with the Louisville Colonels, Montreal Royals and Newark Indians.
- August 3 – Charlie Hastings, 63, pitcher for the Cleveland Spiders in 1893 and the Pittsburgh Pirates from 1896 through 1898.
- August 8 – Wilbert Robinson, 70, Hall of Fame player and manager who spent 35 years in the majors, first as an outstanding catcher for the Baltimore Orioles during the 1890s, and later managing the Brooklyn Robins to two National League pennants in 1916 and 1920, while compiling a 1,399–1,398 managing record from 1914 to 1931.
- August 11 – Joe Ward, 49, backup infielder who played with the Philadelphia Phillies in 1906, and for the New York Highlanders and the Philadelphia Phillies from 1909 to 1910.
- August 12 – Ed Andrews, 75, outfielder and second baseman for the Philadelphia Quakers, Indianapolis Hoosiers, Brooklyn Ward's Wonders and Cincinnati Kelly's Killers in parts of nine seasons spanning 1884–1891, who led the National League with 56 stolen bases in 1896, and topped American Association outfielders with a .961 fielding average in 1891.
- August 14 – Guy Morrison, 38, pitcher for the Boston Braves in the 1927 and 1928 seasons.
- August 17 – Doc Potts, 65, catcher who appeared in one game for the 1892 Washington Senators of the National League.
- August 21 – Carl Lundgren, 54, pitcher who posted a 91–55 record and a 2.42 ERA in 178 games for the Chicago Cubs, while helping his team win three consecutive National League pennants from 1906 to 1908, and two World Series championships in 1907 and 1908.
- August 26 – Bill Kling, 67, pitcher who played from 1891 through 1892 for the Philadelphia Phillies and Baltimore Orioles, and with the Louisville Colonels in 1895.
- August 27 – Henry Kohler, 82, National Association catcher/infielder for the Fort Wayne Kekiongas in 1871, and the Baltimore Marylands/Canaries from 1873 to 1874.

=== September ===
- September 9 – John Dobbs, 53, outfielder who played from 1901 through 1905 for the Cincinnati Reds, Chicago Orphans, Chicago Cubs and Brooklyn Superbas.
- September 22 – Tom Messitt, 60, catcher for the 1889 Louisville Colonels.

=== October ===
- October 4 – Nixey Callahan, 60, one of the most versatile figures in the late 1800s and early 1900s, who averaged 16 wins in six full seasons, including two 20-wins seasons in 1903–1904 and the first no-hitter in American League history in 1902, while also playing the outfield and four infield positions between pitching appearances, to later manage the Chicago White Sox and the Pittsburgh Pirates.
- October 6 – Tom Mansell, 79, outfielder who played for the Troy Trojans, Syracuse Stars, Detroit Wolverines, St. Louis Browns, Cincinnati Red Stockings and Columbus Buckeyes in parts of three seasons spanning 1879–1884.
- October 8 – Bill Snyder, 36, pitcher for the Washington Senators from 1919 to 1920.
- October 9 – Pat Pettee, 71, second baseman who played for the Louisville Colonels in 1891.
- October 11 – Sandy Burk, 47, pitcher who played for the Brooklyn Superbas, Brooklyn Dodgers, St. Louis Cardinals and Pittsburgh Rebels in a span of five seasons from 1910 to 1915.
- October 14 – Les Cox, 30, pitcher for the 1926 Chicago White Sox.
- October 16 – Highball Wilson, 56, pitcher who played for the Cleveland Spiders in 1899, the Philadelphia Athletics in 1902, and the Washington Senators from 1903 to 1904.
- October 18 – Guy Morton, 41, pitcher for the Cleveland Naps and Cleveland Indians from 1914 to 1924.
- October 20 – Paddy Greene, 59, third baseman who played from 1902 through 1903 for the Philadelphia Phillies, New York Highlanders and Detroit Tigers.
- October 22 – Belden Hill, 70, third baseman for the 1890 Baltimore Orioles of the American Association.

=== November ===
- November 8 – Reddy Grey, 59, outfielder who appeared in one game with the 1903 Pittsburgh Pirates.
- November 15 – Barney Reilly, 50, second baseman for the Chicago White Sox in the 1909 season.
- November 17 – Kid McLaughlin, 46, center fielder who played for the Cincinnati Reds in 1914.
- November 18 – Tuffy Stewart, 51, right fielder for the Chicago Cubs in 1913 and 1914.
- November 21 – Fred Glade, 58, pitcher for the Chicago Orphans, St. Louis Browns and New York Highlanders at the turn of the 20th century.
- November 22 – Pop Swett, 64, catcher who played in 37 games for the 1890 Boston Reds.

=== December ===
- December 2:
  - Tom Daley, 60, outfielder who played for the Cincinnati Reds in 1908, the Philadelphia Athletics in 1912 and 1913, and the New York Yankees from 1914 to 1915.
  - Scotty Barr, 48, outfielder who played for the Philadelphia Athletics in the 1908 and 1909 seasons.
- December 13 – Doc Shanley, 45, shortstop who played for the St. Louis Browns in 1912.
- December 20 – Parke Wilson, 67, catcher for the New York Giants from 1893 to 1899.
- December 22 – Kitty Brashear, 57, pitcher for the 1899 Louisville Colonels.
- December 26:
  - George Kopshaw, 39, catcher who played for the St. Louis Cardinals in the 1923 season.
  - Jule Mallonee, 34, outfielder for the 1925 Chicago White Sox.
- December 30 – George Henry, 71, outfielder for the 1893 Cincinnati Reds.
