= Steamboat Struss =

American baseball player (1909–1985)

- Pitcher
- Born: February 24, 1909; Riverdale, Illinois
- Died: September 12, 1985 (aged 76); Grand Rapids, Michigan
- Batted: Right Threw: Right

MLB debut
- September 30, 1934, for the Pittsburgh Pirates

Last MLB appearance
- September 30, 1934, for the Pittsburgh Pirates

MLB statistics
- Win–loss record: 0–1
- Earned run average: 6.43
- Strikeouts: 3
- Stats at Baseball Reference

Teams
- Pittsburgh Pirates (1934)

Clarence Herbert "Steamboat" Struss (February 24, 1909 – September 12, 1985), was a Major League Baseball pitcher who played in 1934 with the Pittsburgh Pirates. He batted and threw right-handed. He was the starting pitcher for the final game of Pittsburgh's 1934 season and was tagged with the loss, giving up 6 runs (5 earned) in 7 innings. At the plate, he was rather more successful, going 1-for-3, with his lone hit being a 2-RBI double.

Struss was born in Riverdale, Illinois, and died in Grand Rapids, Michigan.
