= Lloyd Johnson (baseball) =

American baseball player (1910–1980)

- Pitcher
- Born: December 24, 1910; Santa Rosa, California, U.S.
- Died: October 8, 1980 (aged 69); Stockton, California, U.S.
- Batted: Left Threw: Left

MLB debut
- April 21, 1934, for the Pittsburgh Pirates

Last MLB appearance
- April 21, 1934, for the Pittsburgh Pirates

MLB statistics
- Games pitched: 1
- Innings pitched: 1.0
- Batters faced: 3
- Win–loss record: 0–0
- Earned run average: 0.00
- Strikeouts: 0
- Stats at Baseball Reference

Teams
- Pittsburgh Pirates (1934)

Lloyd William "Eppa" Johnson (December 24, 1910 – October 8, 1980) was an American professional baseball pitcher in Major League Baseball. He played in one game with the Pittsburgh Pirates on April 21, 1934. In his only inning of work, he faced only 3 Cincinnati Reds batters although he surrendered a single to Gordon Slade, the first batter he faced. His entire minor league career spanned 1930 to 1941.
