= Dizzy Dean =

American baseball player and coach (1910–1974)

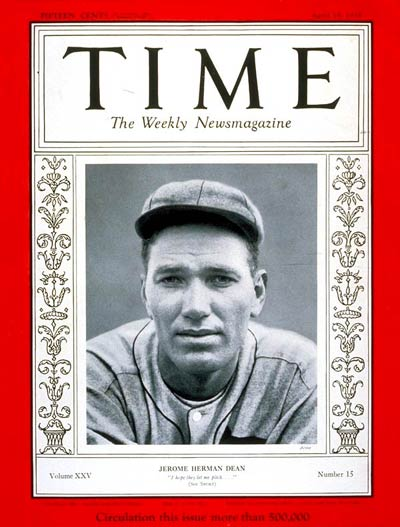
- Dean on the cover of Time magazine in 1935
- Pitcher
- Born: January 16, 1910; Lucas, Arkansas, U.S.
- Died: July 17, 1974 (aged 64); Reno, Nevada, U.S.
- Batted: Right Threw: Right

MLB debut
- September 28, 1930, for the St. Louis Cardinals

Last MLB appearance
- September 28, 1947, for the St. Louis Browns

MLB statistics
- Win–loss record: 150–83
- Earned run average: 3.02
- Strikeouts: 1,163
- Stats at Baseball Reference

Teams
- St. Louis Cardinals (1930, 1932–1937); Chicago Cubs (1938–1941); St. Louis Browns (1947)

Career highlights and awards
- 4× All-Star (1934–1937); World Series champion (1934); NL MVP (1934); 2× MLB wins leader (1934, 1935); 4× MLB strikeout leader (1932–1935); St. Louis Cardinals No. 17 retired; St. Louis Cardinals Hall of Fame

Member of the National

Baseball Hall of Fame
- Induction: 1953
- Vote: 79.2% (ninth ballot)

Jay Hanna "Dizzy" Dean (January 16, 1910 – July 17, 1974), also known as Jerome Herman Dean (both the 1910 and the 1920 Censuses show his name as "Jay"), was an American professional baseball pitcher. During his Major League Baseball (MLB) career, he played for the St. Louis Cardinals, Chicago Cubs, and St. Louis Browns.

A brash and colorful personality, Dean is the last National League (NL) pitcher to win 30 games in one season (1934). After his playing career, Dean became a popular television sports commentator. Dean was elected to the Baseball Hall of Fame in 1953. When the Cardinals reopened the team Hall of Fame in 2014, he was inducted in the inaugural class.

== Early life ==
Jay Hanna "Dizzy" Dean was born on January 16, 1910, in Lucas, Arkansas, and attended public school only through second grade. He earned his nickname in 1929 in San Antonio, Texas, while in the U.S. Army and pitching for the Fort Sam Houston baseball team. The 19-year-old Dean was on the mound as it took on the MLB's Chicago White Sox. As Dean worked his way through the Sox lineup, an exasperated Chicago manager reportedly yelled "Knock that dizzy kid out the box!" He proceeded to call him "dizzy kid" through the rest of the game, and the moniker stuck.

== Professional career ==
=== St. Louis Cardinals (1930, 1932–1937) ===
Dean made his professional debut in 1930 and worked his way up to the major leagues that same year, throwing a complete game three-hitter for the Cardinals.

==== Ace of the Gashouse Gang ====
Dean made his major league debut on September 28, 1930, the final day of the 1930 regular season. The 20 year-old earned a complete game win against the Pittsburgh Pirates, allowing only three hits and one run. He did not pitch in the major leagues the following year. Dean pitched his first full season in 1932 and turned in a stellar rookie campaign, leading the major leagues with 191 strikeouts and four shutouts. He improved again the following year, when he pitched a 3.04 ERA and again led the league with 199 strikeouts. Perhaps his finest game of the 1933 season came on July 30, when he set a modern-era record by striking out 17 batters in the first game of a doubleheader against the Chicago Cubs.

Dean was best known for winning 30 games in 1934 while leading the "Gashouse Gang" Cardinals to the National League pennant and the World Series win over the Detroit Tigers. He had a 30–7 record with a 2.66 ERA during the regular season. His brother, Paul, was also on the team, with a record of 19–11, and was nicknamed "Daffy", although this was usually only done for press consumption. Though "Diz" sometimes called his brother "Daf", he typically referred to himself and his brother as "Me an' Paul." Continuing the theme, the team included Dazzy Vance and Joe "Ducky" Medwick.

St. Louis was the southernmost and westernmost city in the major leagues at the time, and the Gashouse Gang became a de facto "America's Team." Team members, particularly Southerners such as the Dean brothers and Pepper Martin, became folk heroes in the Depression-ravaged United States. Americans saw in these players a spirit of hard work and perseverance, as opposed to the haughty, highly paid New York Giants, whom the Cardinals chased for the National League pennant.

Much like later sports legends Joe Namath and Muhammad Ali, Dean liked to brag about his prowess and make public predictions. In 1934, Dean predicted, "Me an' Paul are gonna win 45 games." On September 21, Dean pitched no-hit ball for eight innings against the Brooklyn Dodgers, finishing with a three-hit shutout in the first game of a doubleheader, his 27th win of the season. Paul then threw a no-hitter in the nightcap to win his 18th, matching the 45 that Dean had predicted. "Gee, Paul," Dean was heard to say in the locker room afterward, "if I'd a-known you was gonna throw a no-hitter, I'd a-throw'ed one too!" On May 5, 1937, he bet he could strike out Vince DiMaggio four times in the game. He struck him out his first three at-bats, but when DiMaggio hit a popup behind the plate at his fourth, Dean screamed at his catcher, Bruce Ogrodowski, "Drop it!, Drop it!" Ogrodowski did and Dean fanned DiMaggio, winning the bet. Few in the press now doubted Dean's boast, as he was also fond of saying, "If ya done it, it ain't braggin'." Dean finished with 30 wins, the only NL pitcher to do so in the post-1920 live-ball era, and Paul finished with 19, for a total of 49. The Cards needed them all to edge the Giants for the pennant, setting up a matchup with the American League champion Detroit Tigers. After the season, Dean was awarded the National League's Most Valuable Player Award.

Dean was known for antics which inspired his nickname. In time, perception became reality. In Game 4 of the 1934 World Series against Detroit, Dean was sent to first base as a pinch runner. The next batter hit a potential double play ground ball. Intent on avoiding the double play, Dean threw himself in front of the throw to first. The ball struck him on the head, and Dean was knocked unconscious and taken to a hospital. Dean later told reporters, "They X-rayed my head and found nothing". The St. Louis Post-Dispatch and the Detroit Free Press merely stated that the X-rays "revealed no lasting injury."

Although the Tigers went on to win the game 10–4, Dean recovered in time to pitch in Game 5, which he lost. After the Cardinals won Game 6, Dean came back and pitched a complete-game shutout in Game 7 to win the game and the Series for the Cardinals. The Dean brothers accounted for all four wins, with two each.

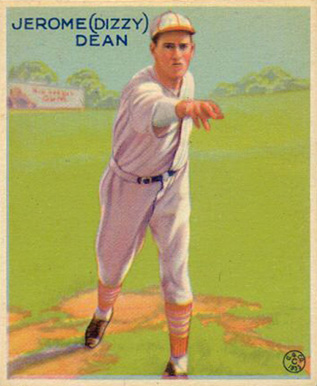
Dizzy Dean 1933 Goudey baseball card

While pitching for the NL in the 1937 All-Star Game, Dean faced Earl Averill of the American League Cleveland Indians. Averill hit a line drive back at the mound, hitting Dean on the foot. Told that his big toe was fractured, Dean responded, "Fractured, hell, the damn thing's broken!" Coming back too soon from the injury, Dean changed his pitching motion to avoid landing as hard on his sore toe enough to affect his mechanics. As a result, he hurt his arm, losing his great fastball. At the time Dean was injured he sported a 12–7 record. He finished the season 13–10.

=== Chicago Cubs (1938–1941) ===
By 1938, Dean's arm had not recovered. Hopeful it would, Chicago Cubs owner Philip K. Wrigley ordered scout Clarence "Pants" Rowland to buy Dean's contract at any cost. On April 16, Rowland obtained Dean in a trade for three players (pitchers Clyde Shoun and Curt Davis and outfielder Tuck Stainback) plus $185,000 in cash—an enormous sum then. In limited use Dean proved exceptional—going 7–1 and posting a 1.81 ERA, by far the best of his career—helping the Cubs win the 1938 National League pennant. The Cubs had been in third place, six games behind the first place Pittsburgh Pirates. By September 27, with one week left in the season, the Cubs had battled back to within a game and a half of the Pirates in the National League standings as the two teams met for a crucial three-game series.

Dean pitched the opening game of the series and with an ailing arm, relied more on his experience and grit to defeat the Pirates by a score of 2–1. Dean would later call it the greatest outing of his career. The victory cut the Pirates' lead to a half game and, set the stage for one of baseball's most memorable moments when in the next game of the series, Cubs player-manager, Gabby Hartnett, hit his famous "Homer in the Gloamin'" to put the Cubs into first place. The Cubs clinched the pennant three days later. Dean pitched gamely in Game 2 of the 1938 World Series before losing to the New York Yankees in what became known as "Ol' Diz's Last Stand".

Returning to the Cubs in 1939, Dean made 19 appearances (13 starts) resulting in a 6–4 record with 7 complete games, 2 shutouts, and a still well above league average 3.36 ERA. The team finished fourth in the NL. Beginning to fail badly, he was limited to just 10 games (nine starts) in 1940 and posted a 3–3 record with a 5.17 ERA, as the Cubs finished fifth in the league. He appeared in a single game during the 1941 season, pitching just one inning while allowing three runs. In mid-May, he announced his retirement as a player.

In 1942, Dean appeared in one game for the Superior Blues, a Class C team in the Northern League; as the starting pitcher, he allowed three runs in two innings, and then played in the outfield.

=== Semi-professional appearance ===
In July 1943, Dean agreed to pitch in a semipro game between the Green Sox of Fremont, Ohio, and the Detroit Cubs. His opponent was popular Negro Leagues pitcher and funnyman Peanuts Davis, who had been playing for the Cincinnati Clowns previously. The game, played in Toledo, drew a large crowd that expected to see a pitching duel. However, Davis was driven from the mound after one inning. Dean pitched the first four innings, giving up four hits and one run, and then played in right field for the remainder of the game, which the Green Sox won, 14–5.

=== St. Louis Browns (1947) ===
==== One-game comeback ====
Dean made a one-game major-league comeback on September 28, 1947. After retiring as a player, the still-popular Dean was hired as a broadcaster by the perennially cash-poor St. Louis Browns to drum up some badly needed publicity. After broadcasting several poor pitching performances in a row, he grew frustrated, saying on the air, "Doggone it, I can pitch better than nine out of the ten guys on this staff!" The wives of the Browns pitchers complained, and management, needing to sell tickets somehow, took him up on his offer and had him pitch the last game of the season versus the Chicago White Sox. At age 37, Dean pitched four innings, allowing no runs, and rapped a single in his only at-bat. Rounding first base, he pulled his hamstring. Returning to the broadcast booth at the end of the game, he said, "I said I can pitch better than nine of the ten guys on the staff, and I can. But I'm done. Talking's my game now, and I'm just glad that muscle I pulled wasn't in my throat."

== Broadcasting career ==
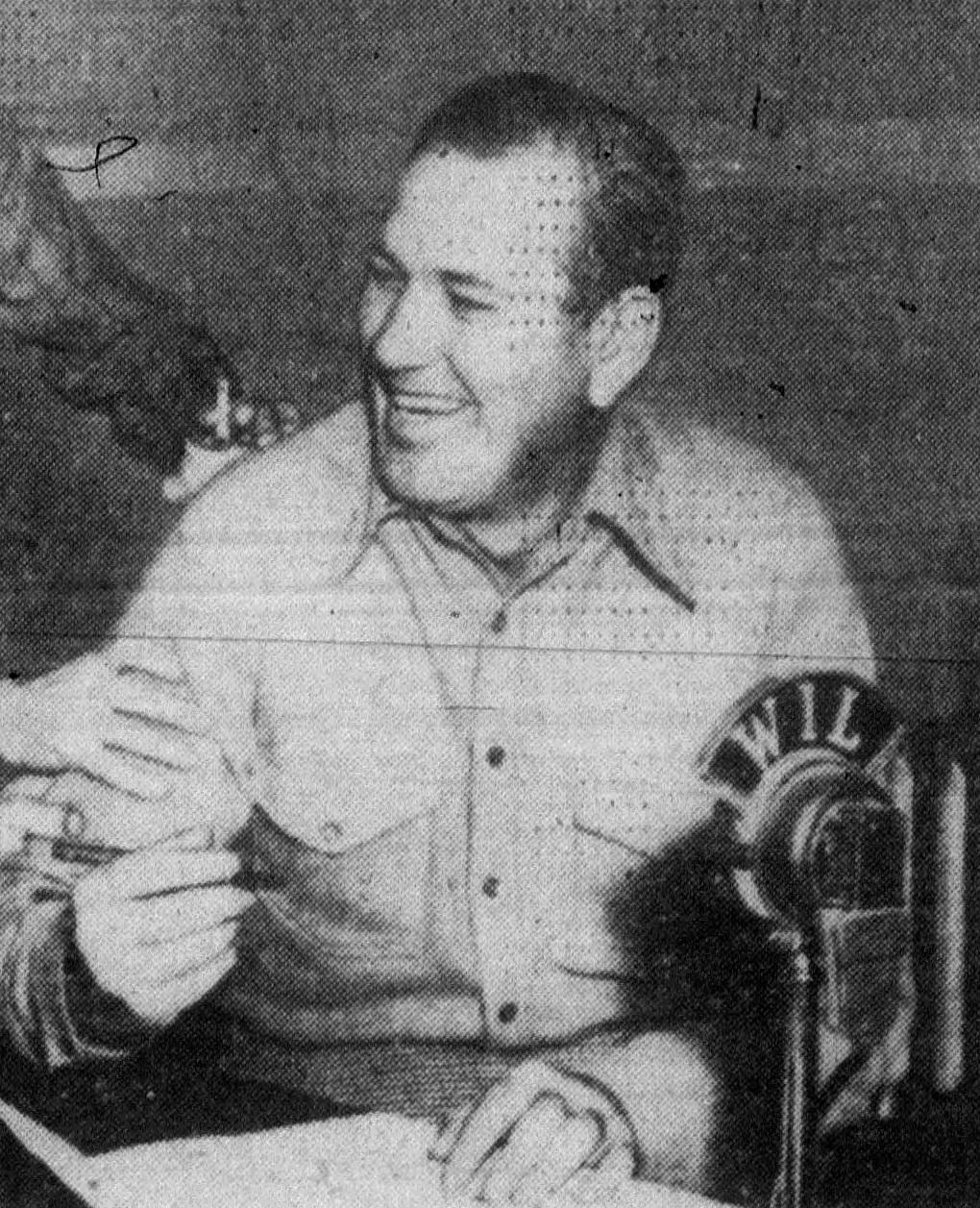
Dizzy Dean in 1947

Following his playing career, Dean became a well-known radio and television sportscaster, calling baseball for the Cardinals (1941–1946), Browns (1941–1948), Yankees (1950–1951), and Atlanta Braves (1966–1968) and nationally with Mutual (1952), ABC (1953–1954), and CBS (1955–1965), where he teamed first with Buddy Blattner then with Pee Wee Reese. As a broadcaster, Dean was famous for his wit and his often-colorful butchering of the English language. Much like football star-turned-sportscaster Terry Bradshaw years later, he chose to build on, rather than counter, his image as a not-too-bright country boy, as a way of entertaining fans: "The Good Lord was good to me. He gave me a strong right arm, a good body, and a weak mind." He once saw Browns outfielder Al Zarilla slide into a base, and said, "Zarilla slud into third!" "Slud" instead of "slid" became a frequently used Dean expression. Thanks to baseball fan Charles Schulz, another Dean expression found its way into a Peanuts strip, as Lucy commented on a batter who swung at a pitch outside the strike zone: "He shouldn't hadn't ought-a swang!"

While broadcasting a game on CBS, Dizzy Dean was once heard over an open microphone remarking that he did not know why the broadcast was being called the "Game of the Week", noting that another matchup between the Los Angeles Dodgers and San Francisco Giants was airing on NBC. Dean was also known for humorous on-air expressions, occasionally signing off with the phrase "Don't fail to miss tomorrow's game". During rain delays he sometimes entertained viewers with off-key renditions of the folk song Wabash Cannonball.

An English teacher once wrote to him, complaining that he shouldn't use the word "ain't" on the air, as it was a bad example to children. On the air, Dean said, "A lot of folks who ain't sayin' 'ain't,' ain't eatin'. So, Teach, you learn 'em English, and I'll learn 'em baseball."

In the 1950s, Dean appeared in guest roles on Faye Emerson's Wonderful Town on CBS and on The Guy Mitchell Show on ABC.

== Accomplishments ==
Dizzy Dean's number 17 was retired by the St. Louis Cardinals in 1974.

- Four time All-Star selection (1934, 1935, 1936, 1937)
- Four consecutive strikeout titles (1934–1937)
- Led National League in complete games four consecutive years (1934–1937)
- World Series champion (1934) – starter and winner of two games
- Three time 20-game winner; won 30 games in 1934
- Elected to the Baseball Hall of Fame in 1953
- MVP in 1934
- Inducted into the St. Louis Walk of Fame
- Despite having what amounted to only half a career, in 1999, he ranked Number 85 on "The Sporting News list of the 100 Greatest Baseball Players", and was nominated as a finalist for the Major League Baseball All-Century Team.
- St. Louis Cardinals retired his number 17 on Sunday September 22, 1974, 67 days after his death.
- In January, 2014, the Cardinals announced Dean among 22 former players and personnel to be inducted into the St. Louis Cardinals Hall of Fame Museum for the inaugural class of 2014.
- Dean was inducted into the Baseball Reliquary's Shrine of the Eternals in 2014.

== Later life and death ==
In October 1961, Dean announced that a company with which he was associated as vice-president, Dizzy Dean Enterprises, would construct a $350,000 charcoal briquette plant in Pachuta, Mississippi shortly after the beginning of 1962. The plant was anticipated to use $200,000 worth of low-quality hardwood scraps each year in the production of 10,000 tons of briquets annually when fully on line.

After leaving sportscasting in the late 1960s, Dean retired with his wife, Patricia, to her hometown of Bond, Mississippi.

After retiring to Mississippi, Dean was investigated for his role in an interstate gambling ring but was ultimately not charged. The indictments handed down in the United States District Court for the Eastern District of Michigan in 1970 named him and his nephew, Paul, as co-conspirators but not defendants. He denied any wrongdoing and cooperated as a witness.

Dean died July 17, 1974, at age 64 in Reno, Nevada, of a heart attack, and was buried in the Bond Cemetery. Dean's home in Bond was named Deanash, a combination of his name and his wife's maiden name (Nash); it was willed by Dean's wife to the Mississippi Baptist Convention, which operates foster homes for children in a rural setting.

== Recognition ==
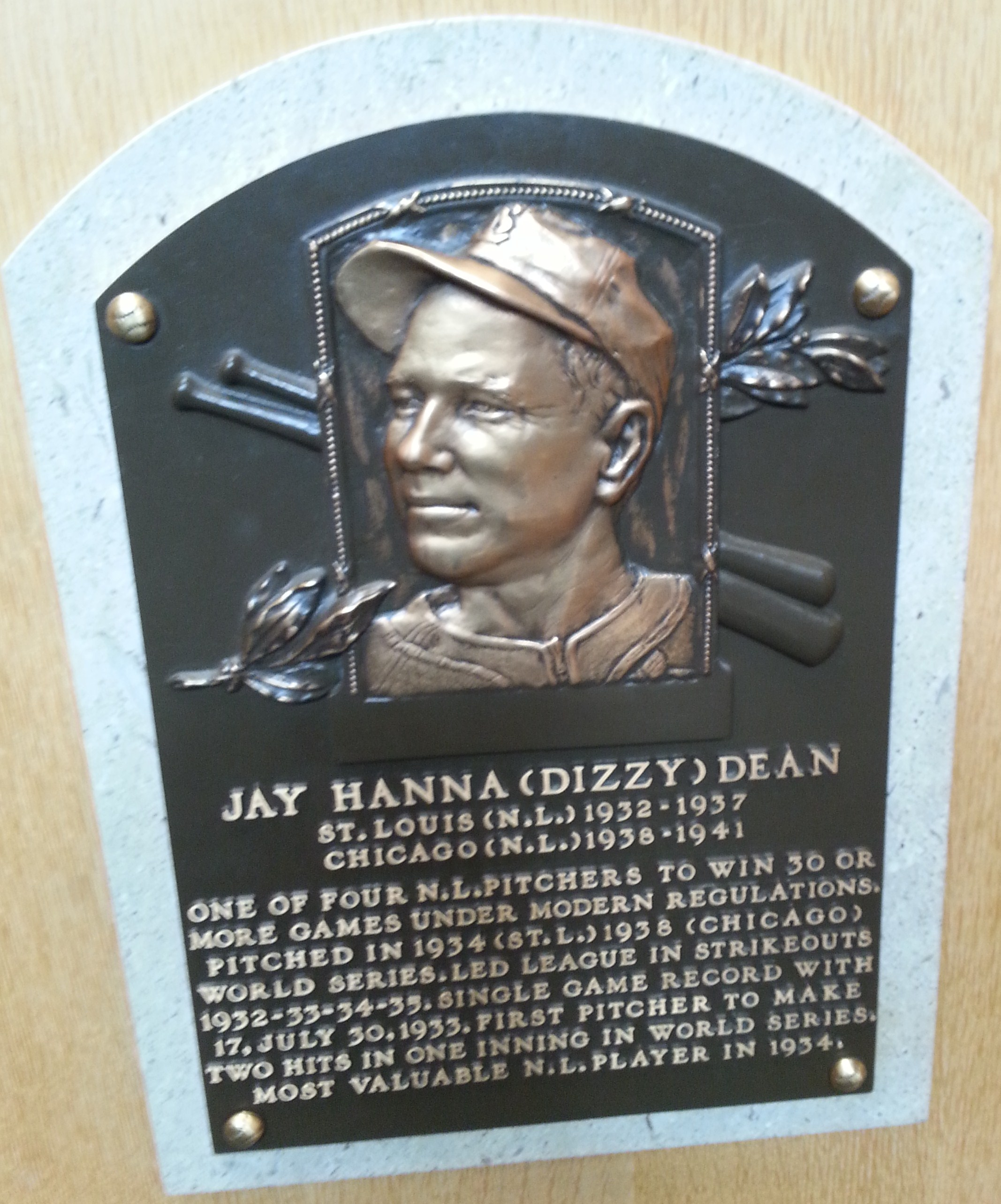
Dizzy Dean's plaque at the National Baseball Hall of Fame and Museum

The Pride of St. Louis, a motion picture loosely based on Dean's career, was released in 1952. Dan Dailey portrayed Dean. Chet Huntley, who would later gain fame as an NBC News anchorman, played an uncredited role in the movie as Dean's radio announcing sidekick.

A Dizzy Dean Museum was established at 1152 Lakeland Drive in Jackson, Mississippi. The Dean exhibit is now part of the Mississippi Sports Hall of Fame & Museum, located adjacent to Smith-Wills Stadium, a former minor-league baseball park.

In the 1971 sci-fi movie The Resurrection of Zachary Wheeler, Leslie Nielsen answers incorrectly "Dizzy Dean, 1935" when asked in which season did a pitcher win 30 games before Denny McLain.

Dean was mentioned in the 1949 poem "Line-Up for Yesterday" by Ogden Nash:

Line-Up for Yesterday

D is for Dean,
The grammatical Diz,
When they asked, Who's the tops?
Said correctly, I is.

— Ogden Nash, Sport magazine (January 1949)

Dean was referenced in the classic TV sitcom The Honeymooners by the character Ed Norton, who justified mooching a second dinner off of Ralph Kramden by saying, "Look, let's face it, Ralph. Dizzy Dean warms up in the bullpen before the game, but he still pitches." Later in the scene, when tensions rise, Kramden quips "Shut up, Dizzy Dean, and eat your spaghetti!"

Dean was parodied in the 1936 Merrie Melodies cartoon Boulevardier from the Bronx with a character named Dizzy Dan.

Dean was also referenced in the 1939 Laurel and Hardy film A Chump at Oxford, when Oliver Hardy unknowingly called the character of the actual dean at the famous Oxford University a "dizzy dean".

Dean is also featured prominently in some versions of Abbott and Costello's "Who's on First?" comedy sketch. In the sketch, Abbott is explaining to Costello that many ballplayers have unusual nicknames including Dizzy Dean, his brother Daffy Dean, and their "French cousin Goofé Dean" ("goofy" pronounced with a French accent).

Actor Ben Jones wrote and performed a one-man play about Dean, entitled Ol' Diz.

The United States Congress designated the U.S. Post Office in Wiggins, Mississippi as the "Jay Hanna 'Dizzy' Dean Post Office" in 2000 by Public Law 106–236. On October 22, 2007, a rest area on U.S. Route 49 in Wiggins, Mississippi, 5 miles (8.0 km) south of Dean's home in Bond, was named "Dizzy Dean Rest Area" after Dean.

In Morrison Bluff, Arkansas, about 2 miles (3.2 km) south of Clarksville, there is a restaurant, Porky's, with Dizzy Dean memorabilia.

In 2015, author Carolyn E. Mueller and illustrator Ed Koehler published an animated book titled Dizzy Dean and the Gashouse Gang (ISBN 978-1-68106-002-6). The book showcases the antics of Dizzy and his brother Paul Dean, Joe Medwick, Pepper Martin, player/manager Frankie Frisch, and the 1934 St. Louis Cardinals season in their quest to win their third World Series.

Dizzy Dean in one of the characters of Mr. Vértigo, the novel written by the American author Paul Auster in 1994.

Branch Rickey, who was the Cardinals' general manager during Dean's time with the club, had a high regard for both Dean's talent and his character, while remaining bemused by Dean's casual interpersonal skills. After one of their talks, the well-educated Rickey said, "Tell me why I spent four mortal hours today conversing with a person named Dizzy Dean."

== Career statistics ==
W	L	ERA	G	GS	CG	SHO	SV	IP	H	ER	HR	BB	SO	Win Pct.	ERA+
150	83	3.02	317	230	154	26	30	1,967	1,919	661	95	453	1,163	.644	130

Dean was an effective hitting pitcher. He posted a .225 batting average (161-for-717) with 76 runs, 8 home runs, 76 RBI and 5 stolen bases. In five World Series pitching appearances (he was also used in one game as a pinch runner), he hit .333 (5-for-15) with 3 runs, 2 doubles and 1 RBI. Defensively, he was about average, recording a .960 fielding percentage which was one point higher than the league average at his position.

== See also ==
- List of St. Louis Cardinals team records
- List of Major League Baseball annual saves leaders
- List of Major League Baseball annual strikeout leaders
- List of Major League Baseball annual wins leaders
- Major League Baseball titles leaders
