= 1934 Pittsburgh Pirates season =

1934 Pittsburgh Pirates
- League: National League
- Ballpark: Forbes Field
- City: Pittsburgh, Pennsylvania
- Owners: Bill Benswanger
- Managers: George Gibson, Pie Traynor
- Radio: KQV; Jimmy Murray; WWSW; Walt Sickles

The 1934 Pittsburgh Pirates season was the 53rd season of the Pittsburgh Pirates franchise; the 48th in the National League. The Pirates finished fifth in the league standings with a record of 74–76.

== Regular season ==
The roster featured seven future Hall of Famers: player-manager Pie Traynor, pitcher Waite Hoyt, pitcher Burleigh Grimes, shortstop Arky Vaughan, outfielder Freddie Lindstrom, center fielder Lloyd Waner, and right fielder Paul Waner.

=== Season standings ===
National League
Team	W	L	Pct.	GB	Home	Road
St. Louis Cardinals	95	58	.621	—	48‍–‍29	47‍–‍29
New York Giants	93	60	.608	2	49‍–‍26	44‍–‍34
Chicago Cubs	86	65	.570	8	47‍–‍30	39‍–‍35
Boston Braves	78	73	.517	16	40‍–‍35	38‍–‍38
Pittsburgh Pirates	74	76	.493	19½	45‍–‍32	29‍–‍44
Brooklyn Dodgers	71	81	.467	23½	43‍–‍33	28‍–‍48
Philadelphia Phillies	56	93	.376	37	35‍–‍36	21‍–‍57
Cincinnati Reds	52	99	.344	42	30‍–‍47	22‍–‍52

=== Record vs. opponents ===
1934 National League record Sources:
Team	BSN	BRO	CHC	CIN	NYG	PHI	PIT	STL
Boston	—	16–6–1	12–10	15–7	7–15	14–8	9–11	5–16
Brooklyn	6–16–1	—	8–12	13–9	8–14	13–9	16–6	7–15
Chicago	10–12	12–8	—	14–8	11–10	13–9	14–8–1	12–10
Cincinnati	7–15	9–13	8–14	—	6–16	9–10	7–15	6–16–1
New York	15–7	14–8	10–11	16–6	—	15–7	14–8	9–13
Philadelphia	8–14	9–13	9–13	10–9	7–15	—	7–13	6–16
Pittsburgh	11–9	6–16	8–14–1	15–7	8–14	13–7	—	13–9
St. Louis	16–5	15–7	10–12	16–6–1	13–9	16–6	9–13	—

=== Game log ===
1934 Game Log: 74–76 (Home: 45–32; Away: 29–44)
April: 5–5 (Home: 2–3; Away: 3–2)

#	Date	Opponent	Score	Win	Loss	Save	Attendance	Record
1	April 17	@ Cardinals	1–7	Dean	**Meine** (0–1)	—	—	0–1
2	April 18	@ Cardinals	7–6	**French** (1–0)	Grimes	**Chagnon** (1)	—	1–1
3	April 19	@ Cardinals	14–4	**Birkofer** (1–0)	Hallahan	—	—	2–1
4	April 21	@ Reds	3–8	Stout	**Swift** (0–1)	Shaute	—	2–2
5	April 22	@ Reds	5–4	**Smith** (1–0)	Shaute	—	—	3–2
6	April 24	Cardinals	5–4	**Chagnon** (1–0)	Haines	—	15,000	4–2
7	April 26	Cardinals	1–10	Hallahan	**Birkofer** (1–1)	—	—	4–3
8	April 28	Reds	4–7	Frey	**Swift** (0–2)	Derringer	—	4–4
9	April 29	Reds	9–5	**Lucas** (1–0)	Shaute	—	20,000	5–4
10	April 30	Cubs	6–8 (12)	Bush	**French** (1–1)	—	—	5–5

May: 15–11 (Home: 10–2; Away: 5–9)

#	Date	Opponent	Score	Win	Loss	Save	Attendance	Record
11	May 1	Cubs	4–1	**Birkofer** (2–1)	Root	—	—	6–5
12	May 2	Cubs	4–2	**Meine** (1–1)	Warneke	—	—	7–5
13	May 3	Giants	3–5	Bell	**Smith** (1–1)	—	—	7–6
14	May 4	Giants	4–3	**Lucas** (2–0)	Hubbell	—	—	8–6
15	May 5	Giants	6–3	**Birkofer** (3–1)	Fitzsimmons	—	—	9–6
16	May 6	Dodgers	8–5	**Meine** (2–1)	Leonard	**Hoyt** (1)	12,000	10–6
17	May 7	Dodgers	7–6 (10)	**Chagnon** (2–0)	Leonard	—	—	11–6
18	May 8	Dodgers	5–2	**Swift** (1–2)	Mungo	—	—	12–6
19	May 9	Phillies	2–6	Davis	**Lucas** (2–1)	—	—	12–7
20	May 11	Phillies	6–4 (10)	**Hoyt** (1–0)	Collins	—	—	13–7
21	May 12	Phillies	11–6	**Chagnon** (3–0)	Holley	**Hoyt** (2)	—	14–7
22	May 13	Braves	9–2	**Smith** (2–1)	Brandt	—	14,000	15–7
23	May 17	@ Dodgers	1–2 (10)	Mungo	**Swift** (1–3)	—	—	15–8
24	May 18	@ Dodgers	8–3	**Birkofer** (4–1)	Perkins	**French** (1)	—	16–8
25	May 19	@ Dodgers	5–8	Herring	**Lucas** (2–2)	—	—	16–9
26	May 20	@ Phillies	4–16	Davis	**Smith** (2–2)	Hansen	—	16–10
27	May 21	@ Phillies	11–4	**French** (2–1)	Pearce	—	—	17–10
28	May 22	@ Phillies	13–4 (7)	**Birkofer** (5–1)	Darrow	—	—	18–10
29	May 23	@ Braves	1–6	Frankhouse	**Meine** (2–2)	—	—	18–11
30	May 24	@ Braves	7–3	**Swift** (2–3)	Brandt	—	—	19–11
31	May 27	@ Giants	7–3	**Lucas** (3–2)	Smith	—	35,000	20–11
32	May 28	@ Giants	2–3 (11)	Luque	**French** (2–2)	—	—	20–12
33	May 28	@ Giants	0–1	Hubbell	**Birkofer** (5–2)	—	—	20–13
34	May 30	@ Cubs	2–7	Warneke	**Meine** (2–3)	—	—	20–14
35	May 30	@ Cubs	4–5 (11)	Root	**French** (2–3)	—	40,000	20–15
36	May 31	@ Cubs	5–11	Bush	**Swift** (2–4)	—	—	20–16

June: 14–13 (Home: 11–11; Away: 3–2)

#	Date	Opponent	Score	Win	Loss	Save	Attendance	Record
37	June 1	Cardinals	4–3	**Hoyt** (2–0)	Hallahan	—	—	21–16
38	June 2	Cardinals	4–13	Dean	**Lucas** (3–3)	—	—	21–17
39	June 2	Cardinals	6–3	**French** (3–3)	Winford	—	—	22–17
40	June 3	Cardinals	4–2	**Meine** (3–3)	Carleton	**Hoyt** (3)	—	23–17
41	June 6	@ Reds	3–1	**Swift** (3–4)	Derringer	—	—	24–17
42	June 6	@ Reds	5–1	**Birkofer** (6–2)	Frey	—	—	25–17
43	June 7	@ Reds	2–1	**Lucas** (4–3)	Kleinhans	—	—	26–17
44	June 8	@ Cardinals	2–6	Carleton	**French** (3–4)	—	—	26–18
45	June 10	@ Cardinals	2–3	Dean	**French** (3–5)	—	—	26–19
46	June 12	Dodgers	7–9	Smythe	**Hoyt** (2–1)	—	—	26–20
47	June 13	Dodgers	15–2	**Swift** (4–4)	Herring	—	—	27–20
48	June 14	Dodgers	2–3 (10)	Mungo	**Birkofer** (6–3)	—	—	27–21
49	June 15	Dodgers	4–6	Zachary	**Lucas** (4–4)	—	—	27–22
50	June 16	Giants	2–5	Hubbell	**Birkofer** (6–4)	—	—	27–23
51	June 17	Giants	3–9	Bell	**Meine** (3–4)	Luque	10,000	27–24
52	June 19	Giants	3–5	Schumacher	**French** (3–6)	Hubbell	—	27–25
53	June 20	Braves	6–5	**Chagnon** (4–0)	Smith	—	—	28–25
54	June 21	Braves	1–4	Frankhouse	**Birkofer** (6–5)	—	—	28–26
55	June 21	Braves	7–8	Mangum	**French** (3–7)	Smith	—	28–27
56	June 22	Braves	7–6	**Birkofer** (7–5)	Mangum	—	—	29–27
57	June 23	Braves	4–0	**French** (4–7)	Brandt	—	—	30–27
58	June 24	Phillies	11–5	**Hoyt** (3–1)	Lohrman	—	—	31–27
59	June 25	Phillies	7–1	**Swift** (5–4)	Grabowski	—	—	32–27
60	June 26	Phillies	4–5	Collins	**Birkofer** (7–6)	—	—	32–28
61	June 26	Phillies	4–2 (6)	**Lucas** (5–4)	Holley	—	—	33–28
62	June 27	Phillies	4–1	**French** (5–7)	Davis	—	—	34–28
63	June 29	Cubs	8–8 (8)			—	—	34–28
64	June 30	Cubs	4–6	Lee	**Birkofer** (7–7)	—	—	34–29

July: 11–19 (Home: 5–2; Away: 6–17)

#	Date	Opponent	Score	Win	Loss	Save	Attendance	Record
65	July 1	Cubs	5–4	**Hoyt** (4–1)	Tinning	—	—	35–29
66	July 3	Reds	10–0	**Lucas** (6–4)	Kleinhans	—	—	36–29
67	July 4	Reds	5–1	**French** (6–7)	Johnson	—	—	37–29
68	July 4	Reds	3–4	Derringer	**Swift** (5–5)	—	—	37–30
69	July 6	@ Cubs	1–9	Bush	**Hoyt** (4–2)	—	27,000	37–31
70	July 7	@ Cubs	2–4	Warneke	**Lucas** (6–5)	—	—	37–32
71	July 8	@ Cubs	11–4	**Birkofer** (8–7)	Lee	—	—	38–32
72	July 8	@ Cubs	3–12	Weaver	**Swift** (5–6)	—	47,138	38–33
73	July 11	@ Giants	2–3	Schumacher	**Hoyt** (4–3)	—	—	38–34
74	July 12	@ Giants	3–1	**French** (7–7)	Parmelee	—	—	39–34
75	July 12	@ Giants	1–11	Hubbell	**Birkofer** (8–8)	—	—	39–35
76	July 13	@ Giants	6–7	Fitzsimmons	**Lucas** (6–6)	Smith	—	39–36
77	July 14	@ Braves	4–3 (12)	**Swift** (6–6)	Smith	—	—	40–36
78	July 15	@ Braves	5–0	**Hoyt** (5–3)	Rhem	—	—	41–36
79	July 15	@ Braves	0–4	Brandt	**Meine** (3–5)	—	—	41–37
80	July 18	@ Braves	1–3	Frankhouse	**French** (7–8)	—	—	41–38
81	July 18	@ Braves	5–7	Betts	**Holley** (0–1)	Brandt	—	41–39
82	July 19	@ Dodgers	2–4	Leonard	**Swift** (6–7)	—	—	41–40
83	July 21	@ Dodgers	7–8	Carroll	**Lucas** (6–7)	—	—	41–41
84	July 22	@ Dodgers	2–3	Babich	**French** (7–9)	—	—	41–42
85	July 22	@ Dodgers	10–13	Benge	**Holley** (0–2)	Leonard	15,000	41–43
86	July 23	@ Phillies	2–3	Moore	**Swift** (6–8)	—	—	41–44
87	July 24	@ Phillies	0–9	Johnson	**Lucas** (6–8)	—	—	41–45
88	July 26	@ Phillies	3–0	**French** (8–9)	Collins	—	—	42–45
89	July 26	@ Phillies	3–5	Davis	**Smith** (2–3)	—	—	42–46
90	July 27	Cardinals	4–0	**Swift** (7–8)	Haines	—	—	43–46
91	July 28	Cardinals	5–4	**Hoyt** (6–3)	Dean	—	—	44–46
92	July 29	Cardinals	5–9	Carleton	**Swift** (7–9)	Dean	—	44–47
93	July 31	@ Reds	4–6	Kleinhans	**French** (8–10)	—	—	44–48
94	July 31	@ Reds	7–5 (11)	**Hoyt** (7–3)	Freitas	—	5,500	45–48

August: 14–16 (Home: 11–13; Away: 3–3)

#	Date	Opponent	Score	Win	Loss	Save	Attendance	Record
95	August 1	@ Reds	6–7	Derringer	**Chagnon** (4–1)	Johnson	—	45–49
96	August 2	@ Reds	13–3	**Lucas** (7–8)	Frey	—	—	46–49
97	August 3	@ Cardinals	3–9	Dean	**Hoyt** (7–4)	—	—	46–50
98	August 4	@ Cardinals	4–6	Carleton	**French** (8–11)	Dean	—	46–51
99	August 5	@ Cardinals	6–4	**French** (9–11)	Dean	—	—	47–51
100	August 5	@ Cardinals	7–2	**Hoyt** (8–4)	Hallahan	—	—	48–51
101	August 7	Cubs	4–1	**Meine** (4–5)	Lee	—	—	49–51
102	August 8	Cubs	4–7	Malone	**Holley** (0–3)	Warneke	—	49–52
103	August 8	Cubs	3–14	Bush	**Swift** (7–10)	—	—	49–53
104	August 10	Reds	8–7	**Meine** (5–5)	Derringer	—	—	50–53
105	August 11	Reds	3–4	Johnson	**French** (9–12)	Freitas	—	50–54
106	August 11	Reds	8–3	**Lucas** (8–8)	Kleinhans	—	—	51–54
107	August 12	Reds	9–6	**Hoyt** (9–4)	Derringer	—	—	52–54
108	August 14	Giants	3–2	**Hoyt** (10–4)	Hubbell	—	—	53–54
109	August 15	Giants	4–5	Fitzsimmons	**French** (9–13)	Smith	—	53–55
110	August 15	Giants	4–3	**Hoyt** (11–4)	Bell	—	18,000	54–55
111	August 17	Giants	3–7	Parmelee	**Lucas** (8–9)	Smith	—	54–56
112	August 17	Giants	3–8	Hubbell	**Meine** (5–6)	—	—	54–57
113	August 18	Dodgers	2–6	Clark	**Grimes** (0–1)	—	—	54–58
114	August 19	Dodgers	1–2	Benge	**Hoyt** (11–5)	—	3,000	54–59
115	August 20	Dodgers	6–2	**Swift** (8–10)	Babich	—	—	55–59
116	August 21	Dodgers	5–9	Mungo	**French** (9–14)	Zachary	—	55–60
117	August 23	Phillies	6–5	**Meine** (6–6)	Davis	—	—	56–60
118	August 25	Phillies	4–1	**Hoyt** (12–5)	Hansen	—	—	57–60
119	August 25	Phillies	8–12	Moore	**Swift** (8–11)	Collins	—	57–61
120	August 26	Braves	5–8	Mangum	**Smith** (2–4)	Cantwell	—	57–62
121	August 27	Braves	8–5	**Birkofer** (9–8)	Smith	**Hoyt** (4)	—	58–62
122	August 28	Braves	3–5	Brandt	**Grimes** (0–2)	—	—	58–63
123	August 29	Braves	0–11	Betts	**French** (9–15)	—	—	58–64
124	August 29	Braves	7–0	**Hoyt** (13–5)	Mangum	—	—	59–64

September: 15–12 (Home: 6–1; Away: 9–11)

#	Date	Opponent	Score	Win	Loss	Save	Attendance	Record
125	September 2	@ Reds	1–2	Derringer	**Birkofer** (9–9)	—	—	59–65
126	September 2	@ Reds	11–4	**Swift** (9–11)	Freitas	—	10,147	60–65
127	September 3	Cardinals	12–2	**French** (10–15)	Dean	—	—	61–65
128	September 3	Cardinals	6–5	**Meine** (7–6)	Dean	—	—	62–65
129	September 5	@ Braves	8–2	**Swift** (10–11)	Cantwell	—	—	63–65
130	September 6	@ Braves	4–1	**Birkofer** (10–9)	Brandt	—	—	64–65
131	September 9	@ Giants	1–0	**French** (11–15)	Fitzsimmons	—	20,000	65–65
132	September 10	@ Giants	9–7	**Grimes** (1–2)	Schumacher	**Birkofer** (1)	—	66–65
133	September 11	@ Giants	1–3	Parmelee	**Swift** (10–12)	—	—	66–66
134	September 12	@ Giants	2–3	Hubbell	**Birkofer** (10–10)	—	—	66–67
135	September 15	@ Phillies	6–1	**French** (12–15)	Davis	—	—	67–67
136	September 15	@ Phillies	4–1	**Hoyt** (14–5)	Hansen	—	—	68–67
137	September 18	@ Dodgers	4–9	Leonard	**Swift** (10–13)	—	—	68–68
138	September 19	@ Dodgers	1–4	Mungo	**Birkofer** (10–11)	—	—	68–69
139	September 19	@ Dodgers	4–8	Babich	**French** (12–16)	—	—	68–70
140	September 20	@ Dodgers	1–2	Munns	**Hoyt** (14–6)	—	—	68–71
141	September 21	Reds	9–3	**Lucas** (9–9)	Richmond	—	—	69–71
142	September 21	Reds	16–3	**Swift** (11–13)	Johnson	—	—	70–71
143	September 22	Cubs	2–1	**Birkofer** (11–11)	Lee	—	—	71–71
144	September 22	Cubs	11–7	**Smith** (3–4)	Tinning	**Hoyt** (5)	—	72–71
145	September 23	Cubs	2–3	Weaver	**Blanton** (0–1)	—	—	72–72
146	September 25	@ Cardinals	2–3	Dean	**French** (12–17)	—	—	72–73
147	September 26	@ Cardinals	3–0	**Hoyt** (15–6)	Dean	—	—	73–73
148	September 27	@ Cubs	2–4	Lee	**Birkofer** (11–12)	—	—	73–74
149	September 29	@ Cubs	6–3	**Lucas** (10–9)	Weaver	—	—	74–74
150	September 30	@ Cubs	2–8	Warneke	**French** (12–18)	—	—	74–75
151	September 30	@ Cubs	5–7	Bush	**Struss** (0–1)	—	10,000	74–76

Legend: = Win = Loss = Tie
Bold = Pirates team member

=== Roster ===
1934 Pittsburgh Pirates
**Roster**
**Pitchers**: 49 Ralph Birkofer; 43 Cy Blanton; 46 Leon Chagnon; 42 Larry French; -- Burleigh Grimes; 44 Bill Harris; -- Ed Holley; 48 Waite Hoyt; 50 Lloyd Johnson; 40 Red Lucas; 41 Heinie Meine; 47 Hal Smith; -- Steamboat Struss; 45 Bill Swift	**Catchers**: 32 Hal Finney; 30 Earl Grace; 31 Tom Padden; 35 Pat Veltman; **Infielders**: 23 Bill Brubaker; 22 Cookie Lavagetto; 24 Gus Suhr; 25 Tommy Thevenow; 20 Pie Traynor; 21 Arky Vaughan; 26 Pep Young	**Outfielders**: 16 Woody Jensen; 12 Freddie Lindstrom; 14 Wally Roettger; 10 Lloyd Waner; 11 Paul Waner	**Manager**: 33 George Gibson; 20 Pie Traynor; **Coaches**: 34 Doc Crandall; 36 Honus Wagner

== Player stats ==
=== Batting ===
==== Starters by position ====
Note: Pos = Position; G = Games played; AB = At bats; H = Hits; Avg. = Batting average; HR = Home runs; RBI = Runs batted in

Pos	Player	G	AB	H	Avg.	HR	RBI
C	Earl Grace	95	289	78	.270	4	24
1B	Gus Suhr	151	573	162	.283	13	103
2B	Cookie Lavagetto	87	304	67	.220	3	46
3B	Pie Traynor	119	444	137	.309	1	61
SS	Arky Vaughan	149	558	186	.333	12	94
OF	Paul Waner	146	599	217	.362	14	90
OF	Lloyd Waner	140	611	173	.283	1	48
OF	Freddie Lindstrom	97	383	111	.290	4	49

==== Other batters ====
Note: G = Games played; AB = At bats; H = Hits; Avg. = Batting average; HR = Home runs; RBI = Runs batted in

Player	G	AB	H	Avg.	HR	RBI
Tommy Thevenow	122	446	121	.271	0	54
Woody Jensen	88	283	82	.290	0	27
Tom Padden	82	237	76	.321	0	22
Wally Roettger	47	106	26	.245	0	11
Pat Veltman	12	28	3	.107	0	2
Pep Young	19	17	4	.235	0	2
Bill Brubaker	3	6	2	.333	0	1
Hal Finney	5	0	0	----	0	0

=== Pitching ===
==== Starting pitchers ====
Note: G = Games pitched; IP = Innings pitched; W = Wins; L = Losses; ERA = Earned run average; SO = Strikeouts

Player	G	IP	W	L	ERA	SO
Larry French	49	263.2	12	18	3.58	103
Bill Swift	37	212.2	11	13	3.98	81
Red Lucas	29	172.2	10	9	4.38	44
Cy Blanton	1	8.0	0	1	3.38	5
Steamboat Struss	1	7.0	0	1	6.43	3

==== Other pitchers ====
Note: G = Games pitched; IP = Innings pitched; W = Wins; L = Losses; ERA = Earned run average; SO = Strikeouts

Player	G	IP	W	L	ERA	SO
Ralph Birkofer	41	204.0	11	12	4.10	71
Waite Hoyt	48	190.2	15	6	2.93	105
Heinie Meine	26	106.1	7	6	4.32	22
Hal Smith	20	50.0	3	4	7.20	15
Burleigh Grimes	8	27.1	1	2	7.24	9
Ed Holley	5	9.1	0	3	15.43	2

==== Relief pitchers ====
Note: G = Games pitched; W = Wins; L = Losses; SV = Saves; ERA = Earned run average; SO = Strikeouts

Player	G	W	L	SV	ERA	SO
Leon Chagnon	33	4	1	1	4.81	19
Bill Harris	11	0	0	0	6.63	8
Lloyd Johnson	1	0	0	0	0.00	0

== Farm system ==
Level	Team	League	Manager
A	Little Rock Travelers	Southern Association	Doc Prothro
C	Springfield Pirates	Middle Atlantic League	Al DeVormer and Rube Bressler
D	McKeesport Tubers	Pennsylvania State Association	Leo Mackey
