= 1934 St. Louis Cardinals season =

Major League Baseball season

1934 St. Louis Cardinals
- World Series champions National League champions
- League: National League
- Ballpark: Sportsman's Park
- City: St. Louis, Missouri
- Record: 95–58 (.621)
- League place: 1st
- Owners: Sam Breadon
- General managers: Branch Rickey
- Managers: Frankie Frisch
- Radio: KMOX (France Laux); KWK (Bob Thomas, Ray Schmidt)

The 1934 St. Louis Cardinals season was the team's 53rd season in St. Louis, Missouri and the 43rd season in the National League. The Cardinals went 95–58 during the season and finished first in the National League. St. Louis won 18 of their last 23 games to overtake the New York Giants the last two days of the season. In the World Series, they defeated the Detroit Tigers in seven games, winning the last 11–0.

== Offseason ==
- December 15, 1933: Ray Pepper was purchased from the Cardinals by the St. Louis Browns.

== Regular season ==
Pitcher Dizzy Dean won the MVP Award this year, with 30 wins, 195 strikeouts, and a 2.66 ERA. He was also named the Associated Press Athlete of the Year.

=== The Gashouse Gang ===
The Gashouse Gang was a nickname applied to the Cardinals team of 1934. The Cardinals, by most accounts, earned this nickname from the team's generally very shabby appearance and rough-and-tumble tactics. An opponent once stated that the Cardinals players usually went into the field in unwashed, dirty, and smelly uniforms, which alone spread horror among their rivals.

According to one account, scrappy shortstop Leo Durocher coined the term. He and his teammates were speaking derisively of the American League, and the consensus was that the Redbirds – should they prevail in the National League race – would handle whoever won the AL pennant. "Why, they wouldn't even let us in that league over there", Durocher, who had played for the New York Yankees, observed. "They think we're just a bunch of gashousers." The phrase "gas house" referred to plants that manufactured town gas for lighting and cooking from coal, which were common fixtures in US cities prior to the widespread use of natural gas. The plants were noted for their foul smell and were typically located near railroad yards in the poorest neighborhood in the city.

Led by playing manager Frankie Frisch and the hard-nosed Durocher, as well as stars like Joe Medwick, Ripper Collins, Pepper Martin, Bill DeLancey and brothers Dizzy and Paul Dean, the '34 Cardinals won 95 games, the NL pennant, and the World Series in seven games over the Detroit Tigers.

The team featured five regulars who hit at least .300, a 30-game winner in Dizzy Dean (the last National League pitcher to win 30 games in a single season, and the last pitcher in Major League Baseball to do so until Denny McLain accomplished the feat for the 1968 Detroit Tigers), and four All-Stars, including player-manager Frisch. Not among the All-Stars was Collins, the first baseman who led the team in 16 offensive categories, with stats like a .333 batting average, a .615 slugging percentage, 35 home runs, and 128 runs batted in.

=== Season standings ===
National League
Team	W	L	Pct.	GB	Home	Road
St. Louis Cardinals	95	58	.621	—	48‍–‍29	47‍–‍29
New York Giants	93	60	.608	2	49‍–‍26	44‍–‍34
Chicago Cubs	86	65	.570	8	47‍–‍30	39‍–‍35
Boston Braves	78	73	.517	16	40‍–‍35	38‍–‍38
Pittsburgh Pirates	74	76	.493	19½	45‍–‍32	29‍–‍44
Brooklyn Dodgers	71	81	.467	23½	43‍–‍33	28‍–‍48
Philadelphia Phillies	56	93	.376	37	35‍–‍36	21‍–‍57
Cincinnati Reds	52	99	.344	42	30‍–‍47	22‍–‍52

=== Record vs. opponents ===
1934 National League record Sources:
Team	BSN	BRO	CHC	CIN	NYG	PHI	PIT	STL
Boston	—	16–6–1	12–10	15–7	7–15	14–8	9–11	5–16
Brooklyn	6–16–1	—	8–12	13–9	8–14	13–9	16–6	7–15
Chicago	10–12	12–8	—	14–8	11–10	13–9	14–8–1	12–10
Cincinnati	7–15	9–13	8–14	—	6–16	9–10	7–15	6–16–1
New York	15–7	14–8	10–11	16–6	—	15–7	14–8	9–13
Philadelphia	8–14	9–13	9–13	10–9	7–15	—	7–13	6–16
Pittsburgh	11–9	6–16	8–14–1	15–7	8–14	13–7	—	13–9
St. Louis	16–5	15–7	10–12	16–6–1	13–9	16–6	9–13	—

=== Notable transactions ===
- May 4, 1934: Francis Healy was purchased by the Cardinals from the New York Giants.

=== Roster ===
1934 St. Louis Cardinals
Roster
Pitchers: 15 Tex Carleton; 17 Dizzy Dean; 21 Daffy Dean; 20 Burleigh Grimes; 16 Jesse Haines; 22 Bill Hallahan; 27 Clarence Heise; 31 Jim Lindsey; 28 Jim Mooney; 31 Flint Rhem; 19 Dazzy Vance; 18 Bill Walker; 19 Jim Winford	Catchers: 8 Spud Davis; 9 Bill DeLancey; 27 Francis Healy; Infielders: 12 Ripper Collins; 11 Pat Crawford; 2 Leo Durocher; 3 Frankie Frisch; 1 Pepper Martin; 14 Burgess Whitehead	Outfielders: 4 Kiddo Davis; 4 Chick Fullis; 7 Joe Medwick; 10 Buster Mills; 24 Gene Moore; 5 Ernie Orsatti; 6 Jack Rothrock; Other batters: 29 Lew Riggs; 31 Red Worthington	Manager: 3 Frankie Frisch; Coaches: 25 Mike González; 26 Buzzy Wares

== Player stats ==
=== Batting ===
==== Starters by position ====
Note: Pos = Position; G = Games played; AB = At bats; H = Hits; Avg. = Batting average; HR = Home runs; RBI = Runs batted in

Pos	Player	G	AB	H	Avg.	HR	RBI
C	Spud Davis	107	347	104	.300	9	65
1B	Ripper Collins	154	600	200	.333	35	128
2B	Frankie Frisch	140	550	168	.305	3	75
3B	Pepper Martin	110	454	131	.289	5	49
SS	Leo Durocher	146	500	130	.260	3	70
OF	Jack Rothrock	154	647	184	.284	11	72
OF	Joe Medwick	149	620	198	.319	18	106
OF	Ernie Orsatti	105	337	101	.300	0	31

==== Other batters ====
Note: G = Games played; AB = At bats; H = Hits; Avg. = Batting average; HR = Home runs; RBI = Runs batted in

Player	G	AB	H	Avg.	HR	RBI
Burgess Whitehead	100	332	92	.277	1	24
Bill DeLancey	93	253	80	.316	13	40
Chick Fullis	69	199	52	.261	0	26
Buster Mills	29	72	17	.236	1	8
Pat Crawford	61	70	19	.271	0	16
Kiddo Davis	16	33	10	.303	1	4
Gene Moore	9	18	5	.278	0	1
Francis Healy	15	13	4	.308	0	1
Lew Riggs	2	1	0	.000	0	0
Red Worthington	1	1	0	.000	0	0

=== Pitching ===
==== Starting pitchers ====
Note: G = Games pitched; IP = Innings pitched; W = Wins; L = Losses; ERA = Earned run average; SO = Strikeouts

Player	G	IP	W	L	ERA	SO
Dizzy Dean	50	311.2	30	7	2.66	195
Tex Carleton	40	240.2	16	11	4.26	103
Paul Dean	39	233.1	19	11	3.43	150
Bill Hallahan	32	162.2	8	12	4.26	70

==== Other pitchers ====
Note: G = Games pitched; IP = Innings pitched; W = Wins; L = Losses; ERA = Earned run average; SO = Strikeouts

Player	G	IP	W	L	ERA	SO
Bill Walker	24	153.0	12	4	3.12	76
Flint Rhem	5	15.2	1	0	4.60	6
Jim Winford	5	12.2	0	2	7.82	3

==== Relief pitchers ====
Note: G = Games pitched; W = Wins; L = Losses; SV = Saves; ERA = Earned run average; SO = Strikeouts

Player	G	W	L	SV	ERA	SO
Jesse Haines	37	4	4	1	3.50	17
Jim Mooney	32	2	4	1	5.47	27
Dazzy Vance	19	1	1	1	3.66	33
Jim Lindsey	11	0	1	1	6.43	7
Burleigh Grimes	4	2	1	0	3.52	1
Pepper Martin	1	0	0	0	4.50	0
Clarence Heise	1	0	0	0	4.50	1

== 1934 World Series ==
In the World Series, the Cards and Tigers split the first two games in Detroit, and the Tigers took two of the next three in St. Louis. St. Louis proceeded to win the next two, including an 11–0 embarrassment of the Tigers in Detroit to win the Series. The stars for the Cardinals were Medwick, who had a .379 batting average with one of St. Louis' two home runs and a series-high five RBI, and the Dean brothers, who combined for all four of the teams wins with 28 strikeouts and a minuscule 1.43 earned run average.

NL St. Louis Cardinals (4) vs. AL Detroit Tigers (3)

Game	Score	Date	Location	Attendance
1	Cardinals – 8, Tigers – 3	October 3	Navin Field	42,505
2	Cardinals – 2, Tigers – 3 (12 innings)	October 4	Navin Field	43,451
3	Tigers – 1, Cardinals – 4	October 5	Sportsman's Park	37,073
4	Tigers – 10, Cardinals – 4	October 6	Sportsman's Park	37,492
5	Tigers – 3, Cardinals – 1	October 7	Sportsman's Park	38,536
6	Cardinals – 4, Tigers – 3	October 8	Navin Field	44,551
7	Cardinals – 11, Tigers – 0	October 9	Navin Field	40,902

== League leaders ==
Ripper Collins

- #1 in NL in home runs (35)
- #1 in NL in slugging percentage (.615)
- #2 in NL in runs batted in (128)
- #3 in NL in hits (200)
- #3 in NL in runs scored (116)

Dizzy Dean

- #1 in MLB in wins (30)
- #1 in MLB in strikeouts (195)
- #1 in MLB in shutouts (7)
- #2 in NL in earned run average (2.66)

Paul Dean

- #2 in NL in shutouts (5)
- #3 in NL in strikeouts (150)

Pepper Martin

- #1 in NL in stolen bases (23)

== Farm system ==
Level	Team	League	Manager
AA	Columbus Red Birds	American Association	Ray Blades
AA	Rochester Red Wings	International League	Specs Toporcer
A	Elmira Red Wings	New York–Pennsylvania League	Ira Smith and Joe Mathes
A	Houston Buffaloes	Texas League	Carey Selph
B	Springfield Red Birds	Central League	Joe Mathes
B	Greensboro Patriots	Piedmont League	Bob Rice
C	Huntington Red Birds	Middle Atlantic League	Eddie Dyer
C	Paris Pirates/Lufkin Lumbermen	West Dixie League	Wayne Windle
C	Springfield Red Wings	Western Association	Mike Ryba
D	Martinsville Manufacturers	Bi-State League	Jimmie Sanders
D	Beatrice Blues	Nebraska State League	Sonny Brookhaus
D	Lincoln Links	Nebraska State League	Cy Lingle and Pug Griffin
D	Norfolk Elkhorns	Nebraska State League	Joe McDermott
D	Sioux Falls Canaries	Nebraska State League	Rex Stucker and Ralph Brandon
D	Greensburg Trojans	Pennsylvania State Association	Clay Hopper

LEAGUE CHAMPIONS: Columbus, Springfield (Western Assn.), Lincoln, Greensburg
Central League folded, June 10, 1934; Paris franchise transferred to Lufkin and renamed, June 27
