= Lew Graulich =

American baseball player (1863–1934)

- First baseman / Catcher
- Born: July 17, 1863; Philadelphia, Pennsylvania, U.S.
- Died: May 3, 1934 (aged 70); Philadelphia, Pennsylvania, U.S.
- Batted: Unknown Threw: Unknown
- Stats at Baseball Reference

Lewis Graulich (July 17, 1863 – May 3, 1934) was an American professional baseball first baseman and catcher. He played in the minor leagues from 1887 to 1892.
