= 1934 Boston Braves season =

1934 Boston Braves
- League: National League
- Ballpark: Braves Field
- City: Boston, Massachusetts
- Record: 78–73 (.517)
- League place: 4th
- Owners: Emil Fuchs
- Managers: Bill McKechnie
- Radio: WNAC (Fred Hoey)

The 1934 Boston Braves season was the 64th season of the franchise. The Braves finished in fourth place in the National League with a record of 78 wins and 73 losses.

== Regular season ==
=== Season standings ===
National League
Team	W	L	Pct.	GB	Home	Road
St. Louis Cardinals	95	58	.621	—	48‍–‍29	47‍–‍29
New York Giants	93	60	.608	2	49‍–‍26	44‍–‍34
Chicago Cubs	86	65	.570	8	47‍–‍30	39‍–‍35
Boston Braves	78	73	.517	16	40‍–‍35	38‍–‍38
Pittsburgh Pirates	74	76	.493	19½	45‍–‍32	29‍–‍44
Brooklyn Dodgers	71	81	.467	23½	43‍–‍33	28‍–‍48
Philadelphia Phillies	56	93	.376	37	35‍–‍36	21‍–‍57
Cincinnati Reds	52	99	.344	42	30‍–‍47	22‍–‍52

=== Record vs. opponents ===
1934 National League record Sources:
Team	BSN	BRO	CHC	CIN	NYG	PHI	PIT	STL
Boston	—	16–6–1	12–10	15–7	7–15	14–8	9–11	5–16
Brooklyn	6–16–1	—	8–12	13–9	8–14	13–9	16–6	7–15
Chicago	10–12	12–8	—	14–8	11–10	13–9	14–8–1	12–10
Cincinnati	7–15	9–13	8–14	—	6–16	9–10	7–15	6–16–1
New York	15–7	14–8	10–11	16–6	—	15–7	14–8	9–13
Philadelphia	8–14	9–13	9–13	10–9	7–15	—	7–13	6–16
Pittsburgh	11–9	6–16	8–14–1	15–7	8–14	13–7	—	13–9
St. Louis	16–5	15–7	10–12	16–6–1	13–9	16–6	9–13	—

=== Roster ===
1934 Boston Braves
Roster
Pitchers: 16 Dick Barrett; 15 Huck Betts; 11 Ed Brandt; 20 Bob Brown; 12 Ben Cantwell; 18 Jumbo Elliott; 14 Fred Frankhouse; 21 Leo Mangum; 26 Clarence Pickrel; 29 Flint Rhem; 17 Bob Smith; 16 Tom Zachary	Catchers: 8 Shanty Hogan; 9 Al Spohrer; Infielders: 16 Elbie Fletcher; 24 Dick Gyselman; 5 Buck Jordan; 30 Les Mallon; 23 Dan McGee; 28 Marty McManus; 2 Billy Urbanski; 6 Pinky Whitney	Outfielders: 3 Wally Berger; 10 Hal Lee; 4 Randy Moore; 7,23 Joe Mowry; 25 Tommy Thompson; 23 Johnnie Tyler; 7 Red Worthington	Manager: 33 Bill McKechnie; Coaches: -- Jewel Ens; 31 Hank Gowdy; 32 Duffy Lewis

== Player stats ==
=== Batting ===
==== Starters by position ====
Note: Pos = Position; G = Games played; AB = At bats; H = Hits; Avg. = Batting average; HR = Home runs; RBI = Runs batted in

Pos	Player	G	AB	H	Avg.	HR	RBI
C	Al Spohrer	100	265	59	.223	0	17
1B	Buck Jordan	124	489	152	.311	2	58
2B	Marty McManus	119	435	120	.276	8	47
3B	Pinky Whitney	146	563	146	.259	12	79
SS	Billy Urbanski	146	605	177	.293	7	53
OF	Wally Berger	150	615	183	.298	34	121
OF	Hal Lee	139	521	152	.292	8	79
OF	Tommy Thompson	105	343	91	.265	0	37

==== Other batters ====
Note: G = Games played; AB = At bats; H = Hits; Avg. = Batting average; HR = Home runs; RBI = Runs batted in

Player	G	AB	H	Avg.	HR	RBI
Randy Moore	123	422	120	.284	7	64
Shanty Hogan	92	279	73	.262	4	34
Les Mallon	42	166	49	.295	0	18
Joe Mowry	25	79	17	.215	1	4
Red Worthington	41	65	16	.246	0	6
Dick Gyselman	24	36	6	.167	0	4
Dan McGee	7	22	3	.136	0	1
Johnnie Tyler	3	6	1	.167	0	1
Elbie Fletcher	8	4	2	.500	0	0

=== Pitching ===
==== Starting pitchers ====
Note: G = Games pitched; IP = Innings pitched; W = Wins; L = Losses; ERA = Earned run average; SO = Strikeouts

Player	G	IP	W	L	ERA	SO
Ed Brandt	40	255.0	16	14	3.53	106
Fred Frankhouse	37	233.2	17	9	3.20	78
Huck Betts	40	213.0	17	10	4.06	69
Flint Rhem	25	152.2	8	8	3.60	56
Ben Cantwell	27	143.1	5	11	4.33	45

==== Other pitchers ====
Note: G = Games pitched; IP = Innings pitched; W = Wins; L = Losses; ERA = Earned run average; SO = Strikeouts

Player	G	IP	W	L	ERA	SO
Bob Brown	16	58.1	1	3	5.71	21
Dick Barrett	15	32.1	1	3	6.68	14
Tom Zachary	5	24.0	1	2	3.38	4
Jumbo Elliott	7	15.1	1	1	5.87	6

==== Relief pitchers ====
Note: G = Games pitched; W = Wins; L = Losses; SV = Saves; ERA = Earned run average; SO = Strikeouts

Player	G	W	L	SV	ERA	SO
Bob Smith	39	6	9	5	4.66	26
Leo Mangum	29	5	3	0	5.72	28
Clarence Pickrel	10	0	0	0	5.06	9

== Farm system ==
Level	Team	League	Manager
A	Harrisburg Senators	New York–Pennsylvania League	Les Mann
