= 1934 Major League Baseball season =

1934 MLB season
- League: American League (AL); National League (NL)
- Sport: Baseball
- Duration: Regular season: April 17 – September 30, 1934; World Series: October 3–9, 1934
- Games: 154
- Teams: 16 (8 per league)

Regular season
- Season MVP: AL: Mickey Cochrane (DET); NL: Dizzy Dean (STL)
- AL champions: Detroit Tigers
- AL runners-up: New York Yankees
- NL champions: St. Louis Cardinals
- NL runners-up: New York Giants

World Series
- Champions: St. Louis Cardinals
- Runners-up: Detroit Tigers

MLB seasons
- ← 1933 1935 →

Locations of teams for the 1934–1939 American League seasons
American League
Locations of teams for the 1932–1935 National League seasons
National League

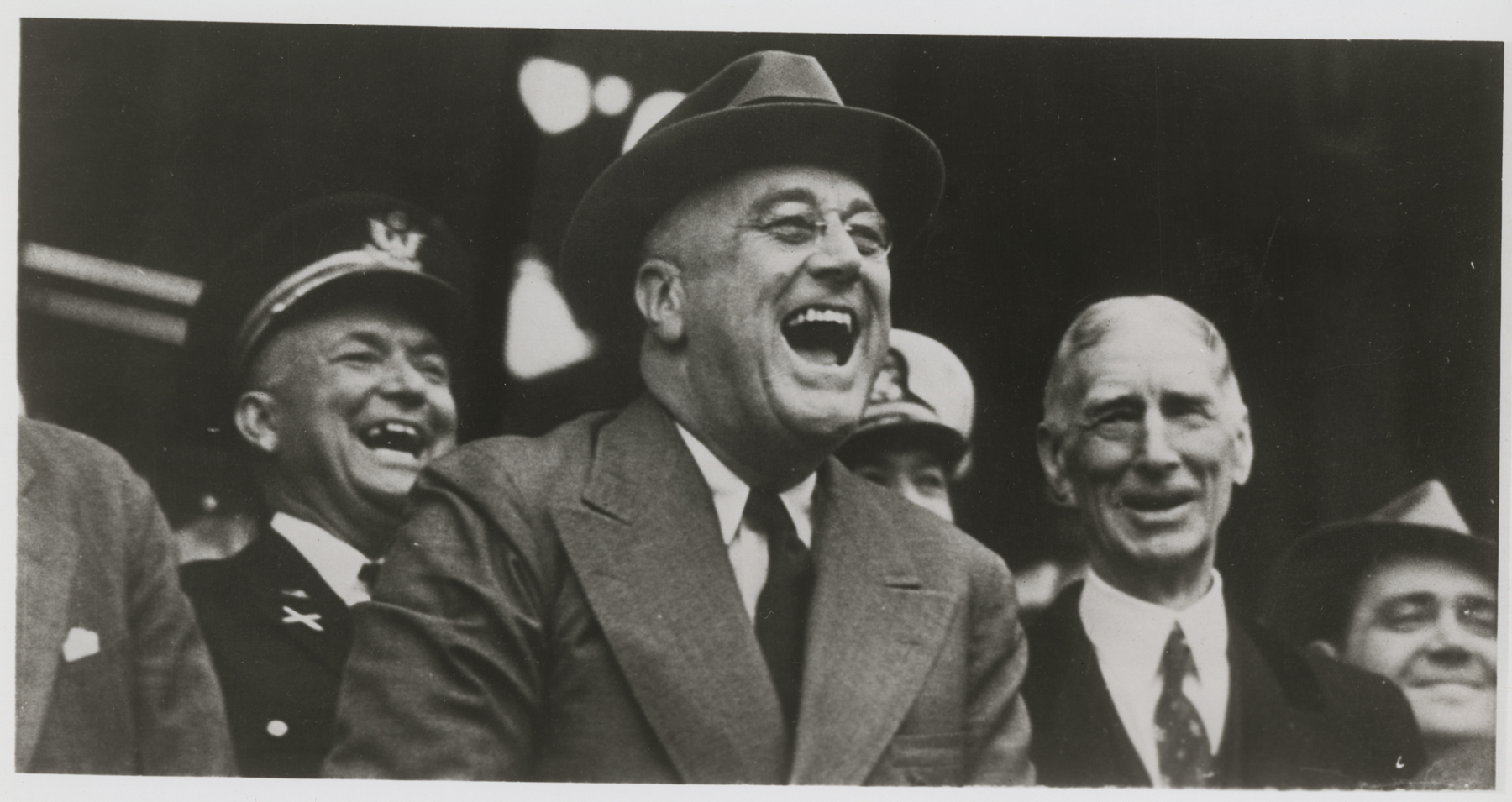
President Franklin D. Roosevelt at Griffith Stadium in Washington, D.C. during a Boston Red Sox vs. Washington Senators game, April 24.

The 1934 major league baseball season began on April 17, 1934. The regular season ended on September 30, with the St. Louis Cardinals and Detroit Tigers as the regular season champions of the National League and American League, respectively. The postseason began with Game 1 of the 31st World Series on October 3 and ended with Game 7 on October 9. The Cardinals then defeated the Tigers, four games to three, capturing their third championship in franchise history, since their previous in 1931. Going into the season, the defending World Series champions were the New York Giants from the 1933 season.

The second All-Star Game was held on July 10 at the Polo Grounds in New York, New York, home of the New York Giants. The American League won, 9–7.

== Schedule ==
The 1934 schedule consisted of 154 games for all teams in the American League and National League, each of which had eight teams. Each team was scheduled to play 22 games against the other seven teams of their respective league. This continued the format put in place since the 1904 season (except for 1919) and would be used until 1961 in the American League and 1962 in the National League.

Opening Day, April 17, featured all sixteen teams, the first since the 1931 season. The final day of the regular season was on September 30, which also saw all sixteen teams play, continued the trend which began with the 1930 season. This was the second time that both Opening Day and the final day of the season saw all sixteen teams play, the previous being in 1931. The World Series took place between October 3 and October 9.

== Rule changes ==
The 1934 season saw the following rule changes:

- The National and American Leagues agree to adopt a uniform ball, authorizing respective Presidents John Heydler and Will Harridge to meet with manufactures and settle on a ball for both leagues.
- Both leagues agreed to prohibit "synthetic" doubleheaders (which is when teams would postpone weekday games to have two games on a weekend day) on Sundays until after June 15.
- Both leagues altered the practices governing counting players on option toward team limits and salary responsibility for optioned players.

== Teams ==
League	Team	City	Ballpark	Capacity	Manager
American League	Boston Red Sox	Boston, Massachusetts	Fenway Park	33,817	Bucky Harris
American League	Chicago White Sox	Chicago, Illinois	Comiskey Park	52,000	Lew Fonseca
American League	Chicago White Sox	Chicago, Illinois	Comiskey Park	52,000	Jimmy Dykes
American League	Cleveland Indians	Cleveland, Ohio	League Park	21,414	Walter Johnson
American League	Detroit Tigers	Detroit, Michigan	Navin Field	30,000	Mickey Cochrane
American League	New York Yankees	New York, New York	Yankee Stadium	62,000	Joe McCarthy
American League	Philadelphia Athletics	Philadelphia, Pennsylvania	Shibe Park	33,000	Connie Mack
American League	St. Louis Browns	St. Louis, Missouri	Sportsman's Park	34,023	Rogers Hornsby
American League	Washington Senators	Washington, D.C.	Griffith Stadium	32,000	Joe Cronin
National League	Boston Braves	Boston, Massachusetts	Braves Field	46,500	Bill McKechnie
National League	Brooklyn Dodgers	New York, New York	Ebbets Field	32,000	Casey Stengel
National League	Chicago Cubs	Chicago, Illinois	Wrigley Field	40,000	Charlie Grimm
National League	Cincinnati Reds	Cincinnati, Ohio	Crosley Field	26,060	Bob O'Farrell
National League	Cincinnati Reds	Cincinnati, Ohio	Crosley Field	26,060	Burt Shotton
National League	Cincinnati Reds	Cincinnati, Ohio	Crosley Field	26,060	Chuck Dressen
National League	New York Giants	New York, New York	Polo Grounds	56,000	Bill Terry
National League	Philadelphia Phillies	Philadelphia, Pennsylvania	Baker Bowl	18,800	Jimmie Wilson
National League	Pittsburgh Pirates	Pittsburgh, Pennsylvania	Forbes Field	41,000	George Gibson
National League	Pittsburgh Pirates	Pittsburgh, Pennsylvania	Forbes Field	41,000	Pie Traynor
National League	St. Louis Cardinals	St. Louis, Missouri	Sportsman's Park	34,023	Frankie Frisch

== Standings ==
=== American League ===
American League
Team	W	L	Pct.	GB	Home	Road
Detroit Tigers	101	53	.656	—	54‍–‍26	47‍–‍27
New York Yankees	94	60	.610	7	53‍–‍24	41‍–‍36
Cleveland Indians	85	69	.552	16	47‍–‍31	38‍–‍38
Boston Red Sox	76	76	.500	24	42‍–‍35	34‍–‍41
Philadelphia Athletics	68	82	.453	31	34‍–‍40	34‍–‍42
St. Louis Browns	67	85	.441	33	36‍–‍39	31‍–‍46
Washington Senators	66	86	.434	34	34‍–‍40	32‍–‍46
Chicago White Sox	53	99	.349	47	29‍–‍46	24‍–‍53

=== National League ===
National League
Team	W	L	Pct.	GB	Home	Road
St. Louis Cardinals	95	58	.621	—	48‍–‍29	47‍–‍29
New York Giants	93	60	.608	2	49‍–‍26	44‍–‍34
Chicago Cubs	86	65	.570	8	47‍–‍30	39‍–‍35
Boston Braves	78	73	.517	16	40‍–‍35	38‍–‍38
Pittsburgh Pirates	74	76	.493	19½	45‍–‍32	29‍–‍44
Brooklyn Dodgers	71	81	.467	23½	43‍–‍33	28‍–‍48
Philadelphia Phillies	56	93	.376	37	35‍–‍36	21‍–‍57
Cincinnati Reds	52	99	.344	42	30‍–‍47	22‍–‍52

=== Tie games ===
8 tie games (5 in AL, 3 in NL), which are not factored into winning percentage or games behind (and were often replayed again) occurred throughout the season.

==== American League ====
- Boston Red Sox, 1
- Chicago White Sox, 1
- Philadelphia Athletics, 3
- St. Louis Browns, 2
- Washington Senators, 3

==== National League ====
- Boston Braves, 1
- Brooklyn Dodgers, 1
- Chicago Cubs, 1
- Cincinnati Reds, 1
- Pittsburgh Pirates, 1
- St. Louis Cardinals, 1

== Postseason ==
The postseason began on October 3 and ended on October 9 with the St. Louis Cardinals defeating the Detroit Tigers in the 1934 World Series in seven games.

=== Bracket ===
World Series
AL	Detroit Tigers	3
NL	St. Louis Cardinals	4

== Managerial changes ==
=== Off-season ===
Team	Former Manager	New Manager
Boston Red Sox	Marty McManus	Bucky Harris
Brooklyn Dodgers	Max Carey	Casey Stengel
Cincinnati Reds	Donie Bush	Bob O'Farrell
Detroit Tigers	Del Baker	Mickey Cochrane
Philadelphia Phillies	Burt Shotton	Jimmie Wilson

=== In-season ===
Team	Former Manager	New Manager
Chicago White Sox	Lew Fonseca	Jimmy Dykes
Cincinnati Reds	Bob O'Farrell	Burt Shotton
Cincinnati Reds	Burt Shotton	Chuck Dressen
Pittsburgh Pirates	George Gibson	Pie Traynor

== League leaders ==
=== American League ===
Hitting leaders
Stat	Player	Total
AVG	Lou Gehrig^{1} (NYY)	.363
OPS	Lou Gehrig (NYY)	1.172
HR	Lou Gehrig^{1} (NYY)	49
RBI	Lou Gehrig^{1} (NYY)	166
R	Charlie Gehringer (DET)	135
H	Charlie Gehringer (DET)	214
SB	Billy Werber (BOS)	40

^{1} American League Triple Crown batting winner

Pitching leaders
Stat	Player	Total
W	Lefty Gomez^{2} (NYY)	26
L	Bobo Newsom (SLB)	20
ERA	Lefty Gomez^{2} (NYY)	2.33
K	Lefty Gomez^{2} (NYY)	158
IP	Lefty Gomez (NYY)	281.2
SV	Jack Russell (WSH)	8
WHIP	Lefty Gomez (NYY)	1.133

^{2} American League Triple Crown pitching winner

=== National League ===
Hitting leaders
Stat	Player	Total
AVG	Paul Waner (PIT)	.362
OPS	Ripper Collins (STL)	1.008
HR	Ripper Collins (STL); Mel Ott (NYG)	35
RBI	Mel Ott (NYG)	135
R	Paul Waner (PIT)	122
H	Paul Waner (PIT)	217
SB	Pepper Martin (STL)	23

Pitching leaders
Stat	Player	Total
W	Dizzy Dean (STL)	30
L	Si Johnson (CIN)	22
ERA	Carl Hubbell (NYG)	2.30
K	Dizzy Dean (STL)	195
IP	Van Mungo (BRO)	315.1
SV	Carl Hubbell (NYG)	8
WHIP	Carl Hubbell (NYG)	1.032

== Milestones ==
=== Batters ===
==== Cycles ====
- Doc Cramer (PHA):
  - Cramer hit for his first cycle and eighth in franchise history, on June 10 against the New York Yankees.
- Lou Gehrig (NYY):
  - Gehrig hit for his first cycle and sixth in franchise history, on June 25 against the Chicago White Sox.
- Moose Solters (BOS):
  - Solters hit for his first cycle and sixth in franchise history, in game one of a doubleheader on August 19 against the Detroit Tigers.

==== Other batting accomplishments ====
- Goose Goslin (DET):
  - Sets a major league record when he grounds into four double plays in a single game against the Cleveland Indians on April 28.
- Babe Ruth (NYY):
  - Became the first player in Major League history to hit 700 home runs on July 13 against the Detroit Tigers.

=== Pitchers ===
==== No-hitters ====
- Paul Dean (STL):
  - Dean threw his first career no-hitter and third no-hitter in franchise history, by defeating the Brooklyn Dodgers 3–0 in game two of a doubleheader on September 21. Dean walked one and struck out six.

== Awards and honors ==
=== Regular season ===
Baseball Writers' Association of America Awards
BBWAA Award	National League	American League
Most Valuable Player	Dizzy Dean (STL)	Mickey Cochrane (DET)

The Sporting News Awards
Award	National League	American League
Most Valuable Player	Dizzy Dean (STL)	Lou Gehrig (NYY)

== Home field attendance ==
Team name	Wins	%±	Home attendance	%±	Per game
Detroit Tigers	101	34.7%	919,161	186.4%	11,490
New York Yankees	94	3.3%	854,682	17.4%	11,100
New York Giants	93	2.2%	730,851	20.9%	9,745
Chicago Cubs	86	0.0%	707,525	19.1%	9,189
Boston Red Sox	76	20.6%	610,640	127.2%	7,930
Brooklyn Dodgers	71	9.2%	434,188	−17.6%	5,639
Cleveland Indians	85	13.3%	391,338	0.9%	5,017
Washington Senators	66	−33.3%	330,074	−24.6%	4,343
St. Louis Cardinals	95	15.9%	325,056	26.9%	4,222
Pittsburgh Pirates	74	−14.9%	322,622	11.7%	4,136
Philadelphia Athletics	68	−13.9%	305,847	2.9%	4,024
Boston Braves	78	−6.0%	303,205	−41.4%	4,043
Chicago White Sox	53	−20.9%	236,559	−40.5%	3,154
Cincinnati Reds	52	−10.3%	206,773	−5.3%	2,651
Philadelphia Phillies	56	−6.7%	169,885	8.6%	2,393
St. Louis Browns	67	21.8%	115,305	30.9%	1,517

== Venues ==
After moving into Cleveland Stadium mid-way through the 1932 season, the Cleveland Indians move back into League Park due to plummeting attendance caused by the Great Depression.

The Cincinnati Reds' Redland Field is renamed to Crosley Field following the February 1934 purchase of the Reds by local businessman Powel Crosley Jr.

== See also ==
- 1934 in baseball (Events, Births, Deaths)
