= Bert Hogg =

American baseball player (1913-1973)

- Third baseman
- Born: April 21, 1913; Detroit, Michigan, U.S.
- Died: November 5, 1973 (aged 60); Detroit, Michigan, U.S.
- Batted: Right Threw: Right

MLB debut
- June 1, 1934, for the Brooklyn Dodgers

Last MLB appearance
- June 2, 1934, for the Brooklyn Dodgers

MLB statistics
- Batting average: .000
- Home runs: 0
- Runs batted in: 0
- Stats at Baseball Reference

Teams
- Brooklyn Dodgers (1934)

Wilbert George Hogg (April 21, 1913 – November 5, 1973) was an American professional baseball player who played third base in the Major Leagues for the 1934 Brooklyn Dodgers. He appeared in two games for the Dodgers on June 1 and June 2, recording one official at bat.
