= 1934 Chicago Cubs season =

1934 Chicago Cubs
- League: National League
- Ballpark: Wrigley Field
- City: Chicago
- Record: 86–65 (.570)
- League place: 3rd
- Owners: Philip K. Wrigley
- General managers: Charles Weber
- Managers: Charlie Grimm
- Radio: WGN (Bob Elson); WBBM (Pat Flanagan)

The 1934 Chicago Cubs season was the 63rd season of the Chicago Cubs franchise, the 59th in the National League and the 19th at Wrigley Field. The Cubs finished third in the National League with a record of 86–65.

== Regular season ==
=== Season standings ===
National League
Team	W	L	Pct.	GB	Home	Road
St. Louis Cardinals	95	58	.621	—	48‍–‍29	47‍–‍29
New York Giants	93	60	.608	2	49‍–‍26	44‍–‍34
Chicago Cubs	86	65	.570	8	47‍–‍30	39‍–‍35
Boston Braves	78	73	.517	16	40‍–‍35	38‍–‍38
Pittsburgh Pirates	74	76	.493	19½	45‍–‍32	29‍–‍44
Brooklyn Dodgers	71	81	.467	23½	43‍–‍33	28‍–‍48
Philadelphia Phillies	56	93	.376	37	35‍–‍36	21‍–‍57
Cincinnati Reds	52	99	.344	42	30‍–‍47	22‍–‍52

=== Record vs. opponents ===
1934 National League record Sources:
Team	BSN	BRO	CHC	CIN	NYG	PHI	PIT	STL
Boston	—	16–6–1	12–10	15–7	7–15	14–8	9–11	5–16
Brooklyn	6–16–1	—	8–12	13–9	8–14	13–9	16–6	7–15
Chicago	10–12	12–8	—	14–8	11–10	13–9	14–8–1	12–10
Cincinnati	7–15	9–13	8–14	—	6–16	9–10	7–15	6–16–1
New York	15–7	14–8	10–11	16–6	—	15–7	14–8	9–13
Philadelphia	8–14	9–13	9–13	10–9	7–15	—	7–13	6–16
Pittsburgh	11–9	6–16	8–14–1	15–7	8–14	13–7	—	13–9
St. Louis	16–5	15–7	10–12	16–6–1	13–9	16–6	9–13	—

=== Roster ===
1934 Chicago Cubs
Roster
Pitchers: 17 Guy Bush; 21 Roy Joiner; 19 Bill Lee; 18 Pat Malone; 23 Lynn Nelson; 14 Charlie Root; 22 Bud Tinning; 15 Dick Ward; 16 Lon Warneke; 12,15 Jim Weaver; 14 Charlie Wiedemeyer	Catchers: 9 Gabby Hartnett; 12 Bob O'Farrell; 61 Babe Phelps; 11 Bennie Tate; Infielders: 41 Dolph Camilli; 43 Phil Cavarretta; 1 Woody English; 31 Augie Galan; 7 Charlie Grimm; 34 Stan Hack; 2 Billy Herman; 41 Don Hurst; 8 Billy Jurges	Outfielders: 3 Kiki Cuyler; 4 Babe Herman; 6 Chuck Klein; 42 Tuck Stainback; 5 Riggs Stephenson	Manager: 7 Charlie Grimm; Coaches: 51 Red Corriden; 56 Mike Kelly

== Player stats ==
=== Batting ===
==== Starters by position ====
Note: Pos = Position; G = Games played; AB = At bats; H = Hits; Avg. = Batting average; HR = Home runs; RBI = Runs batted in

Pos	Player	G	AB	H	Avg.	HR	RBI
C	Gabby Hartnett	130	438	131	.299	22	90
1B	Charlie Grimm	75	267	79	.296	5	47
2B	Billy Herman	113	456	138	.303	3	42
3B	Stan Hack	111	402	116	.289	1	21
SS	Billy Jurges	100	358	88	.246	8	33
OF	Kiki Cuyler	142	559	189	.338	6	69
OF	Babe Herman	125	467	142	.304	14	84
OF	Chuck Klein	115	435	131	.301	20	80

==== Other batters ====
Note: G = Games played; AB = At bats; H = Hits; Avg. = Batting average; HR = Home runs; RBI = Runs batted in

Player	G	AB	H	Avg.	HR	RBI
Woody English	109	421	117	.278	3	31
Tuck Stainback	104	359	110	.306	2	46
Augie Galan	66	192	50	.260	5	22
Don Hurst	51	151	30	.199	3	12
Dolph Camilli	32	120	33	.275	4	19
Riggs Stephenson	38	74	16	.216	0	7
Babe Phelps	44	70	20	.286	2	12
Bob O'Farrell	22	67	15	.224	0	5
Bennie Tate	11	24	3	.125	0	0
Phil Cavarretta	7	21	8	.381	1	6

=== Pitching ===
==== Starting pitchers ====
Note: G = Games pitched; IP = Innings pitched; W = Wins; L = Losses; ERA = Earned run average; SO = Strikeouts

Player	G	IP	W	L	ERA	SO
Lon Warneke	43	291.1	22	10	3.21	143
Bill Lee	35	214.1	13	14	3.40	104
Jim Weaver	27	159.0	11	9	3.91	98

==== Other pitchers ====
Note: G = Games pitched; IP = Innings pitched; W = Wins; L = Losses; ERA = Earned run average; SO = Strikeouts

Player	G	IP	W	L	ERA	SO
Guy Bush	40	209.1	18	10	3.83	75
Pat Malone	34	191.0	14	7	3.53	111
Bud Tinning	39	129.1	4	6	3.34	44
Charlie Root	34	117.2	4	7	4.28	46
Charlie Wiedemeyer	4	8.1	0	0	9.72	2
Lynn Nelson	2	1.0	0	1	36.00	0

==== Relief pitchers ====
Note: G = Games pitched; W = Wins; L = Losses; SV = Saves; ERA = Earned run average; SO = Strikeouts

Player	G	W	L	SV	ERA	SO
Roy Joiner	20	0	1	0	8.21	9
Dick Ward	3	0	0	0	3.00	1

== Farm system ==
Level	Team	League	Manager
AA	Los Angeles Angels	Pacific Coast League	Jack Lelivelt
C	Ponca City Angels	Western Association	Roy Johnson

LEAGUE CHAMPIONS: Los Angeles
