= 1934 Philadelphia Phillies season =

Major League Baseball season

1934 Philadelphia Phillies
- League: National League
- Ballpark: Baker Bowl
- City: Philadelphia
- Owners: Gerald Nugent
- Managers: Jimmie Wilson

The 1934 Philadelphia Phillies season was a season in Major League Baseball. The Phillies finished seventh in the National League with a record of 56 wins and 93 losses.

== Offseason ==
On April 14, 1934, the Phillies entered into an affiliation agreement with the New York–Penn League Hazelton Mountaineers. This was the first minor league affiliation for the Phillies.

=== Notable transactions ===
- October 30, 1933: Jack Warner, a player to be named later, and cash were traded by the Phillies to the St. Paul Saints for Marty Hopkins. The Phillies completed the deal by sending Otto Bluege to the Saints on January 6, 1934.

== Regular season ==
=== Season standings ===
National League
Team	W	L	Pct.	GB	Home	Road
St. Louis Cardinals	95	58	.621	—	48‍–‍29	47‍–‍29
New York Giants	93	60	.608	2	49‍–‍26	44‍–‍34
Chicago Cubs	86	65	.570	8	47‍–‍30	39‍–‍35
Boston Braves	78	73	.517	16	40‍–‍35	38‍–‍38
Pittsburgh Pirates	74	76	.493	19½	45‍–‍32	29‍–‍44
Brooklyn Dodgers	71	81	.467	23½	43‍–‍33	28‍–‍48
Philadelphia Phillies	56	93	.376	37	35‍–‍36	21‍–‍57
Cincinnati Reds	52	99	.344	42	30‍–‍47	22‍–‍52

=== Record vs. opponents ===
1934 National League record Sources:
Team	BSN	BRO	CHC	CIN	NYG	PHI	PIT	STL
Boston	—	16–6–1	12–10	15–7	7–15	14–8	9–11	5–16
Brooklyn	6–16–1	—	8–12	13–9	8–14	13–9	16–6	7–15
Chicago	10–12	12–8	—	14–8	11–10	13–9	14–8–1	12–10
Cincinnati	7–15	9–13	8–14	—	6–16	9–10	7–15	6–16–1
New York	15–7	14–8	10–11	16–6	—	15–7	14–8	9–13
Philadelphia	8–14	9–13	9–13	10–9	7–15	—	7–13	6–16
Pittsburgh	11–9	6–16	8–14–1	15–7	8–14	13–7	—	13–9
St. Louis	16–5	15–7	10–12	16–6–1	13–9	16–6	9–13	—

=== Notable transactions ===
- May 10, 1934: Marty Hopkins was acquired from the Phillies by the St. Paul Saints.

=== Roster ===
1934 Philadelphia Phillies
Roster
Pitchers: 40 Phil Collins; 41 George Darrow; 42 Curt Davis; 43 Jumbo Elliott; 44 Reggie Grabowski; 45 Snipe Hansen; 46 Ed Holley; 47 Syl Johnson; 47 Ted Kleinhans; -- Bill Lohrman; 49 Cy Malis; 48 Cy Moore; 43 Euel Moore; 49 Frank Pearce	Catchers: 10 Joe Holden; 11 Al Todd; 12 Jimmie Wilson; Infielders: 20 Dick Bartell; 24 Dolph Camilli; 21 Lou Chiozza; -- Bud Clancy; 22 Mickey Haslin; 23 Andy High; 23 Marty Hopkins; 24 Don Hurst; 25 Irv Jeffries; 35 Bucky Walters	Outfielders: 30 Ethan Allen; -- Ed Boland; 31 Kiddo Davis; 34 Fred Frink; 31 Chick Fullis; 32 Harvey Hendrick; 33 Johnny Moore; 33 Prince Oana; 34 Art Ruble; 35 Wes Schulmerich; 34 Hack Wilson	Manager: 12 Jimmie Wilson; Coaches: Hans Lobert; Dick Spalding

== Player stats ==
=== Batting ===
==== Starters by position ====
Note: Pos = Position; G = Games played; AB = At bats; H = Hits; Avg. = Batting average; HR = Home runs; RBI = Runs batted in

Pos	Player	G	AB	H	Avg.	HR	RBI
C	Al Todd	91	302	96	.318	4	41
1B	Dolph Camilli	102	378	100	.265	12	68
2B	Lou Chiozza	134	484	147	.304	0	44
3B	Bucky Walters	83	300	78	.260	4	38
SS	Dick Bartell	146	604	187	.310	0	37
OF	Ethan Allen	145	581	192	.330	10	85
OF	Johnny Moore	116	458	157	.343	11	93
OF	Kiddo Davis	100	393	115	.293	3	48

==== Other batters ====
Note: G = Games played; AB = At bats; H = Hits; Avg. = Batting average; HR = Home runs; RBI = Runs batted in

Player	G	AB	H	Avg.	HR	RBI
Jimmie Wilson	91	277	81	.292	3	35
Irv Jeffries	56	175	43	.246	4	19
Mickey Haslin	72	166	44	.265	1	11
Don Hurst	40	130	34	.262	2	21
Harvey Hendrick	59	116	34	.293	0	19
Chick Fullis	28	102	23	.225	0	12
Andy High	47	68	14	.206	0	7
Art Ruble	19	54	15	.278	0	8
Wes Schulmerich	15	52	13	.250	0	1
Bud Clancy	20	49	12	.245	1	7
Ed Boland	8	30	9	.300	0	5
Marty Hopkins	10	25	3	.120	0	3
Prince Oana	6	21	5	.238	0	3
Hack Wilson	7	20	2	.100	0	3
Joe Holden	10	14	1	.071	0	0
Fred Frink	2	0	0	----	0	0

=== Pitching ===
==== Starting pitchers ====
Note: G = Games pitched; IP = Innings pitched; W = Wins; L = Losses; ERA = Earned run average; SO = Strikeouts

Player	G	IP	W	L	ERA	SO
Phil Collins	45	254.0	13	18	4.18	72
Euel Moore	20	122.1	5	7	4.05	38
Ed Holley	15	72.2	1	8	7.18	14

==== Other pitchers ====
Note: G = Games pitched; IP = Innings pitched; W = Wins; L = Losses; ERA = Earned run average; SO = Strikeouts

Player	G	IP	W	L	ERA	SO
Curt Davis	51	274.1	19	17	2.95	99
Snipe Hansen	50	151.0	6	12	5.42	40
Syl Johnson	42	133.2	5	9	3.50	54
Cy Moore	35	126.2	4	9	6.47	55
George Darrow	17	49.0	2	6	5.51	14
Frank Pearce	7	20.0	0	2	7.20	4
Bucky Walters	2	7.0	0	0	1.29	7
Jumbo Elliott	3	5.1	0	1	10.13	1

==== Relief pitchers ====
Note: G = Games pitched; W = Wins; L = Losses; SV = Saves; ERA = Earned run average; SO = Strikeouts

Player	G	W	L	SV	ERA	SO
Reggie Grabowski	27	1	3	0	9.23	13
Ted Kleinhans	5	0	0	0	9.00	2
Bill Lohrman	4	0	1	1	4.50	2
Cy Malis	1	0	0	0	4.91	1

== Farm system ==
Level	Team	League	Manager
A	Hazleton Mountaineers	New York–Pennsylvania League	Frank Uzmann
