= 1934 Brooklyn Dodgers season =

1934 Brooklyn Dodgers
- League: National League
- Ballpark: Ebbets Field
- City: Brooklyn, New York
- Record: 71–81 (.467)
- League place: 6th
- Owners: Stephen McKeever, Brooklyn Trust Company
- President: Stephen McKeever
- Managers: Casey Stengel

Casey Stengel took over as manager for the 1934 Brooklyn Dodgers, but the team still finished in sixth place.

== Offseason ==
- December 1933: Art Herring was purchased by the Dodgers from the Detroit Tigers.
- December 1933: Joe Shaute was purchased from the Dodgers by the Cincinnati Reds.

== Regular season ==
=== Season standings ===
National League
Team	W	L	Pct.	GB	Home	Road
St. Louis Cardinals	95	58	.621	—	48‍–‍29	47‍–‍29
New York Giants	93	60	.608	2	49‍–‍26	44‍–‍34
Chicago Cubs	86	65	.570	8	47‍–‍30	39‍–‍35
Boston Braves	78	73	.517	16	40‍–‍35	38‍–‍38
Pittsburgh Pirates	74	76	.493	19½	45‍–‍32	29‍–‍44
Brooklyn Dodgers	71	81	.467	23½	43‍–‍33	28‍–‍48
Philadelphia Phillies	56	93	.376	37	35‍–‍36	21‍–‍57
Cincinnati Reds	52	99	.344	42	30‍–‍47	22‍–‍52

=== Record vs. opponents ===
1934 National League record Sources:
Team	BSN	BRO	CHC	CIN	NYG	PHI	PIT	STL
Boston	—	16–6–1	12–10	15–7	7–15	14–8	9–11	5–16
Brooklyn	6–16–1	—	8–12	13–9	8–14	13–9	16–6	7–15
Chicago	10–12	12–8	—	14–8	11–10	13–9	14–8–1	12–10
Cincinnati	7–15	9–13	8–14	—	6–16	9–10	7–15	6–16–1
New York	15–7	14–8	10–11	16–6	—	15–7	14–8	9–13
Philadelphia	8–14	9–13	9–13	10–9	7–15	—	7–13	6–16
Pittsburgh	11–9	6–16	8–14–1	15–7	8–14	13–7	—	13–9
St. Louis	16–5	15–7	10–12	16–6–1	13–9	16–6	9–13	—

=== Notable transactions ===
- April 13, 1934: Marty McManus was purchased from the Dodgers by the Boston Braves.
- June 29, 1934: Watty Clark was purchased by the Dodgers from the New York Giants.
- September 1934: Johnny Vander Meer was purchased from the Dodgers by the Boston Braves.

=== Roster ===
1934 Brooklyn Dodgers
Roster
Pitchers: 26 Johnny Babich; 30 Boom-Boom Beck; 28 Ray Benge; 15 Ownie Carroll; 24 Watty Clark; 29 Art Herring; 27 Dutch Leonard; 26 Ray Lucas; 16 Van Mungo; 25 Les Munns; 21 Phil Page; 23 Charlie Perkins; 21 Harry Smythe; 34 Tom Zachary	Catchers: 22 Ray Berres; 10 Al López; 14 Wally Millies; 11 Clyde Sukeforth; Infielders: 2 Jim Bucher; 5 Tony Cuccinello; 8 Lonny Frey; -- Bert Hogg; 12 Jimmy Jordan; 6 Sam Leslie; 7 Johnny McCarthy; 3 Joe Stripp	Outfielders: 17 Buzz Boyle; 20 Glenn Chapman; 1 Johnny Frederick; 18 Len Koenecke; 9 Danny Taylor; 11 Nick Tremark; 4 Hack Wilson	Manager: 31 Casey Stengel; Coaches: 32 Otto Miller

== Player stats ==
=== Batting ===
==== Starters by position ====
Note: Pos = Position; G = Games played; AB = At bats; H = Hits; Avg. = Batting average; HR = Home runs; RBI = Runs batted in

Pos	Player	G	AB	H	Avg.	HR	RBI
C	Al López	140	439	120	.273	7	54
1B	Sam Leslie	146	546	181	.332	9	102
2B	Tony Cuccinello	140	528	138	.261	14	94
3B	Joe Stripp	104	384	121	.315	1	40
SS	Lonny Frey	125	490	139	.284	8	57
OF	Buzz Boyle	128	472	144	.305	7	48
OF	Len Koenecke	123	460	147	.320	14	73
OF	Danny Taylor	120	405	121	.299	7	57

==== Other batters ====
Note: G = Games played; AB = At bats; H = Hits; Avg. = Batting average; HR = Home runs; RBI = Runs batted in

Player	G	AB	H	Avg.	HR	RBI
Jimmy Jordan	97	369	98	.266	0	43
Johnny Frederick	104	307	91	.296	4	35
Hack Wilson	67	172	45	.262	6	27
Glenn Chapman	67	93	26	.280	1	10
Jim Bucher	47	84	19	.226	0	8
Ray Berres	39	79	17	.215	0	3
Clyde Sukeforth	27	43	7	.163	0	1
Johnny McCarthy	17	39	7	.179	1	5
Nick Tremark	17	28	7	.250	0	6
Wally Millies	2	7	0	.000	0	0
Bert Hogg	2	1	0	.000	0	0

=== Pitching ===
==== Starting pitchers ====
Note: G = Games pitched; IP = Innings pitched; W = Wins; L = Losses; ERA = Earned run average; SO = Strikeouts

Player	G	IP	W	L	ERA	SO
Van Mungo	45	315.1	18	16	3.37	184
Ray Benge	36	227.0	14	12	4.32	64
Johnny Babich	25	135.0	7	11	4.20	62

==== Other pitchers ====
Note: G = Games pitched; IP = Innings pitched; W = Wins; L = Losses; ERA = Earned run average; SO = Strikeouts

Player	G	IP	W	L	ERA	SO
Dutch Leonard	44	183.2	14	11	3.28	58
Tom Zachary	22	101.2	5	6	4.43	28
Les Munns	33	99.1	3	7	4.71	41
Ownie Carroll	26	74.1	1	3	6.42	17
Boom-Boom Beck	22	57.0	2	6	7.42	24
Art Herring	14	49.1	2	4	6.20	15
Ray Lucas	10	30.2	1	1	6.75	3
Charlie Perkins	11	24.1	0	3	8.51	5

==== Relief pitchers ====
Note: G = Games pitched; W = Wins; L = Losses; SV = Saves; ERA = Earned run average; SO = Strikeouts

Player	G	W	L	SV	ERA	SO
Watty Clark	17	2	0	0	5.33	10
Harry Smythe	8	1	1	0	5.91	5
Phil Page	6	1	0	0	5.40	4

== Awards and honors ==
- 1934 Major League Baseball All-Star Game
  - Al López reserve
  - Van Mungo reserve

== Farm system ==
Level	Team	League	Manager
C	Dayton Ducks	Middle Atlantic League	Howard Holmes
