= 1934 Cincinnati Reds season =

1934 Cincinnati Reds
- League: National League
- Ballpark: Crosley Field
- City: Cincinnati
- Owners: Powel Crosley Jr.
- General managers: Larry MacPhail
- Managers: Bob O'Farrell, Burt Shotton, Chuck Dressen
- Radio: WFBE (Harry Hartman); WKRC (C.O. "Oatmeal" Brown); WSAI (Red Barber)

The 1934 Cincinnati Reds season was a season in American baseball. The team finished eighth and last in the National League with a record of 52–99, 42 games behind the St. Louis Cardinals. Their .344 winning percentage remains the lowest in franchise history and the 99 losses were the worst in franchise history until the 1982 Reds lost 101 games. Because the schedule did not have 162 games at this time, and the Reds only won 52 games this season compared to 1982, when they lost 101 games, when at the same time winning 61 games, nine more than this team, the 1934 Reds are actually a weaker team than the 1982 team, thus making this team the worst in franchise history overall.

== Off-season ==
In February 1934, Powel Crosley Jr. purchased the Reds from Sidney Weil. He kept the team from going bankrupt and possibly leaving Cincinnati. General manager Larry MacPhail insisted that Redland Field be renamed in honor of the man who had saved the team. The park was renamed Crosley Field, and Crosley himself took the opportunity to advertise his Crosley automobiles.

After purchasing the team, the owner hired Red Barber as the Reds play-by-play commentator on WSAI.

Following the 1933 season, the club fired manager Donie Bush after a 58–94 season. The Reds did not name a replacement until later in the off-season.

On November 15, 1933, the Reds traded second baseman George Grantham to the New York Giants in exchange for pitcher Glenn Spencer. Spencer had a record of 0–2 with a 5.13 ERA in 17 games with the Giants in 1933. He previously pitched with the Pittsburgh Pirates, and led the league in games finished in 1930 with 22.

Two days later, on November 17, Cincinnati traded away pitcher Red Lucas and outfielder Wally Roettger to the Pittsburgh Pirates for outfielder Adam Comorosky and second baseman Tony Piet. Lucas, who had been with the Reds since 1926, earned a record of 109–99 and a 3.64 ERA in 257 games with the team. He led the National League in complete games on three occasions (1929, 1931 and 1932), and led the league in shutouts in 1928. Comorosky played in 64 games with the Pirates in 1933, hitting .284 with a home run and 15 RBI. His best season was in 1930, when Comorosky hit .313 with 12 home runs, 119 RBI and leading the league with 23 triples and 33 sacrifice bunts. Piet had an average of .323 with a home run and 42 RBI in 107 games with Pittsburgh in 1933.

Less than a week later, on November 23, the Reds selected shortstop Gordon Slade off of waivers from the St. Louis Cardinals. Slade struggled in 1933, hitting .113 with 3 RBI in 39 games.

In December, Cincinnati purchased pitcher Joe Shaute from the Brooklyn Dodgers. Shaute had a 3–4 record with a 4.29 ERA in 41 games with Brooklyn in 1933.

On December 20, the club acquired infielder Mark Koenig from the Chicago Cubs in exchange for infielders Irv Jeffries and Otto Bluege. Koenig hit .284 with three home runs and 25 RBI in 80 games with Chicago. Koenig was a two time World Series champion, as he was part of the 1927 and 1928 New York Yankees.

On January 11, the Reds traded away recently acquired Glenn Spencer to the St. Louis Cardinals for catcher Bob O'Farrell and pitcher Syl Johnson. The Reds then named O'Farrell as the player/manager of the team. O'Farrell had previous player/managerial experience, as he led the Cardinals to a 92–61 and a second-place finish in the National League in 1927. As a player, O'Farrell hit .239 with two home runs and 20 RBI in 55 games in 1933. O'Farrell was named the National League Most Valuable Player in 1926. Johnson finished the previous season with a 5–9 record with a 3.46 ERA in 44 games.

On February 6, Cincinnati selected pitcher Dazzy Vance off of waivers from the St. Louis Cardinals. Vance, who would turn 43 before the season began, had a 6–2 record with a 3.55 ERA in 28 games with the Cardinals in 1933. Vance played with the Brooklyn Dodgers from 1922 to 1932, during which he led the National League in strikeouts in seven consecutive seasons (1922–1928), wins twice (28 in 1924, 22 in 1925), ERA three times (2.16 in 1924, 2.09 in 1928, and 2.61 in 1930), shutouts four times (1922, 1925, 1928, and 1930) and complete games two times (1924 and 1927). Vance was the National League Most Valuable Player in 1924.

In March, the team purchased pitcher Don Brennan from the New York Yankees. Brennan was 5–1 with a 4.98 ERA in 18 games during his rookie season in 1933 with New York.

== Regular season ==
The rebuilding Reds struggled to begin the season, winning only five of their first 24 games to quickly find themselves in last place. On May 12, in a game against the Boston Braves, player/manager Bob O'Farrell submitted a lineup card with the last names of his starting nine in alphabetical order, the only time this has happened in MLB history. Although the Reds got 12 hits with this lineup, they lost 8–2. On May 16, Cincinnati traded pitcher Syl Johnson and outfielder Johnny Moore to the Philadelphia Phillies for pitcher Ted Kleinhans, outfielder Art Ruble and outfielder Wes Schulmerich. Less than a week later, the Reds traded Ruble to the Oakland Oaks of the Pacific Coast League for outfielder Harlin Pool. By the end of May, Cincinnati had a record of 8–27 and was 15.5 games behind the St. Louis Cardinals for first place.

The Reds played better baseball in June, posting a 13–16 record during the month; however, Cincinnati remained in last place with a 21–43 record, 19.5 games behind the pennant leading New York Giants. On June 25, the Reds lost pitcher Dazzy Vance to the St. Louis Cardinals off of waivers.

In July, Cincinnati acquired infielder Alex Kampouris from the Sacramento Senators of the Pacific Coast League. Kampouris had a .277 average with 19 home runs with the Senators at the time of the trade.

On July 27, O'Farrell asked for and was granted his release from the team after the team had a record of 30–60. Coach Burt Shotton was named the interim manager for one game. After a win of 11–2 over the Chicago Cubs on July 28, the Reds named former player Chuck Dressen as manager. Dressen had played with Cincinnati from 1925 to 1931, hitting .273 with 11 home runs and 218 RBI in 630 games. He had previously managed the Nashville Vols of the Southern Association since 1932, although he briefly left the Vols to play with the New York Giants late in 1933.

Under Dressen, the Reds continued to struggle; in 60 games as manager, the team had a 21–39 record. Overall, Cincinnati finished the season with a 52–99 record, in last place for the fourth consecutive season. The 52 wins tied the 1901 club for the fewest in a season in club history, while the 99 losses and .344 winning percentage were the worst in team history.

Outfielder Harlin Pool, who was acquired by the Reds during the season, led the team with a .327 batting average while hitting two home runs and 50 RBI in 99 games. Outfielder Chick Hafey hit .293 with a team high 18 home runs in 140 games. First baseman Jim Bottomley hit .284 with 11 home runs, a team high 78 RBI and 11 triples, in 142 games.

Paul Derringer led the Reds pitching staff, earning a record of 15–21 with a 3.59 ERA in 47 games. He led the Reds with 122 strikeouts and 18 complete games. Benny Frey earned a record of 11–16 with a team best 3.52 ERA in 39 games. Si Johnson led the NL in losses, as he was 7–22 with a 5.22 ERA in 46 games. Johnson had also previously led the NL in losses in 1931.

=== Season standings ===
National League
Team	W	L	Pct.	GB	Home	Road
St. Louis Cardinals	95	58	.621	—	48‍–‍29	47‍–‍29
New York Giants	93	60	.608	2	49‍–‍26	44‍–‍34
Chicago Cubs	86	65	.570	8	47‍–‍30	39‍–‍35
Boston Braves	78	73	.517	16	40‍–‍35	38‍–‍38
Pittsburgh Pirates	74	76	.493	19½	45‍–‍32	29‍–‍44
Brooklyn Dodgers	71	81	.467	23½	43‍–‍33	28‍–‍48
Philadelphia Phillies	56	93	.376	37	35‍–‍36	21‍–‍57
Cincinnati Reds	52	99	.344	42	30‍–‍47	22‍–‍52

=== Record vs. opponents ===
1934 National League record Sources:
Team	BSN	BRO	CHC	CIN	NYG	PHI	PIT	STL
Boston	—	16–6–1	12–10	15–7	7–15	14–8	9–11	5–16
Brooklyn	6–16–1	—	8–12	13–9	8–14	13–9	16–6	7–15
Chicago	10–12	12–8	—	14–8	11–10	13–9	14–8–1	12–10
Cincinnati	7–15	9–13	8–14	—	6–16	9–10	7–15	6–16–1
New York	15–7	14–8	10–11	16–6	—	15–7	14–8	9–13
Philadelphia	8–14	9–13	9–13	10–9	7–15	—	7–13	6–16
Pittsburgh	11–9	6–16	8–14–1	15–7	8–14	13–7	—	13–9
St. Louis	16–5	15–7	10–12	16–6–1	13–9	16–6	9–13	—

=== Roster ===
1934 Cincinnati Reds
Roster
Pitchers: -- Junie Barnes; 16 Larry Benton; 19 Don Brennan; 14 Paul Derringer; -- Sherman Edwards; 23 Tony Freitas; 28 Benny Frey; 24 Lee Grissom; 15 Si Johnson; 20 Syl Johnson; 20 Ted Kleinhans; 21 Ray Kolp; 24 Jim Lindsey; -- Beryl Richmond; 22 Joe Shaute; 18 Allyn Stout; 17 Dazzy Vance; 19 Whitey Wistert	Catchers: 27 Ernie Lombardi; 25 Clyde Manion; 26 Bob O'Farrell; Infielders: 4 Sparky Adams; 1 Jim Bottomley; 30 Alex Kampouris; 3 Mark Koenig; 31 Bill Marshall; -- Frank McCormick; 22 Harry McCurdy; 2 Tony Piet; 12 Jimmy Shevlin; 6 Gordon Slade	Outfielders: 12 Linc Blakely; 8 Adam Comorosky; 9 Chick Hafey; 10 Johnny Moore; 2 Ted Petoskey; 10 Harlin Pool; 7 Wes Schulmerich; 11 Ivey Shiver; Other batters: 5 Jake Flowers; 23 Tony Robello	Manager: 26 Chuck Dressen; 26 Bob O'Farrell; 32 Burt Shotton; Coaches: -- Val Picinich; 32 Burt Shotton

== Player stats ==
=== Batting ===
==== Starters by position ====
Note: Pos = Position; G = Games played; AB = At bats; H = Hits; Avg. = Batting average; HR = Home runs; RBI = Runs batted in

Pos	Player	G	AB	H	Avg.	HR	RBI
C	Ernie Lombardi	132	417	127	.305	9	62
1B	Jim Bottomley	142	556	158	.284	11	78
2B	Tony Piet	106	421	109	.259	1	38
3B	Mark Koenig	151	633	172	.272	1	67
SS	Gordon Slade	138	555	158	.285	4	52
OF	Chick Hafey	140	535	157	.293	18	67
OF	Adam Comorosky	127	446	115	.258	0	40
OF	Harlin Pool	99	358	117	.327	2	50

==== Other batters ====
Note: G = Games played; AB = At bats; H = Hits; Avg. = Batting average; HR = Home runs; RBI = Runs batted in

Player	G	AB	H	Avg.	HR	RBI
Sparky Adams	87	278	70	.252	0	14
Wes Schulmerich	74	209	55	.263	5	19
Bob O'Farrell	44	123	30	.244	1	9
Linc Blakely	34	102	23	.225	0	10
Alex Kampouris	19	66	13	.197	0	3
Ivey Shiver	19	59	12	.203	2	6
Clyde Manion	25	54	10	.185	0	4
Johnny Moore	16	42	8	.190	0	5
Jimmy Shevlin	18	39	12	.308	0	6
Frank McCormick	12	16	5	.313	0	5
Jake Flowers	13	9	3	.333	0	0
Bill Marshall	6	8	1	.125	0	0
Ted Petoskey	6	7	0	.000	0	1
Harry McCurdy	3	6	0	.000	0	1
Tony Robello	2	2	0	.000	0	0

=== Pitching ===
==== Starting pitchers ====
Note: G = Games pitched; IP = Innings pitched; W = Wins; L = Losses; ERA = Earned run average; SO = Strikeouts

Player	G	IP	W	L	ERA	SO
Paul Derringer	47	261.0	15	21	3.59	122
Benny Frey	39	245.1	11	16	3.52	33

==== Other pitchers ====
Note: G = Games pitched; IP = Innings pitched; W = Wins; L = Losses; ERA = Earned run average; SO = Strikeouts

Player	G	IP	W	L	ERA	SO
Si Johnson	46	215.2	7	22	5.22	89
Tony Freitas	30	152.2	6	12	4.01	37
Allyn Stout	41	140.2	6	8	4.86	51
Ted Kleinhans	24	80.0	2	6	5.74	23
Don Brennan	28	78.0	4	3	3.81	31
Beryl Richmond	6	19.1	1	2	3.72	9
Dazzy Vance	6	18.0	0	2	7.50	9
Joe Shaute	8	17.1	0	2	4.15	2
Whitey Wistert	2	8.0	0	1	1.13	1
Lee Grissom	4	7.0	0	1	15.43	4

==== Relief pitchers ====
Note: G = Games pitched; W = Wins; L = Losses; SV = Saves; ERA = Earned run average; SO = Strikeouts

Player	G	W	L	SV	ERA	SO
Ray Kolp	28	0	2	3	4.52	19
Larry Benton	16	0	1	2	6.52	5
Jim Lindsey	4	0	0	0	4.50	2
Syl Johnson	2	0	0	0	2.70	0
Junie Barnes	2	0	0	0	0.00	0
Sherman Edwards	1	0	0	0	3.00	1

== Farm system ==
Level	Team	League	Manager
AA	Toronto Maple Leafs	International League	Ike Boone
A	Topeka Senators	Western League	Art Ewoldt and Jimmy Payton
B	Wilmington Pirates	Piedmont League	Blackie Carter and Harry McCurdy
C	Beckley Black Knights	Middle Atlantic League	Milt Stock
C	Bartlesville Reds	Western Association	Marty Purtell
D	Mt. Airy Graniteers	Bi-State League	Cecil Harris and C. G. Thomas
D	Jeannette Reds	Pennsylvania State Association	Ray Ryan

LEAGUE CHAMPIONS: Toronto
