= 1934 New York Giants (MLB) season =

1934 New York Giants
- League: National League
- Ballpark: Polo Grounds
- City: New York City
- Record: 93–60 (.608)
- League place: 2nd
- Owners: Charles Stoneham
- Managers: Bill Terry

The 1934 New York Giants season was the franchise's 52nd season. Although they led in the standings for most of the season, the team finished in second place in the National League with a 93–60 record, 2 games behind the St. Louis Cardinals.

On September 6, the Giants were leading the Cardinals by 7 games with an 85–47 record, but went 8–13 the rest of the season to lose the lead on the final day of the season. The Cardinals went 18–5 in the same time span to win the NL pennant. The Giants became the first team in the modern era to lose the pennant after holding a seven-game lead in September.

== Regular season ==
=== Season standings ===
National League
Team	W	L	Pct.	GB	Home	Road
St. Louis Cardinals	95	58	.621	—	48‍–‍29	47‍–‍29
New York Giants	93	60	.608	2	49‍–‍26	44‍–‍34
Chicago Cubs	86	65	.570	8	47‍–‍30	39‍–‍35
Boston Braves	78	73	.517	16	40‍–‍35	38‍–‍38
Pittsburgh Pirates	74	76	.493	19½	45‍–‍32	29‍–‍44
Brooklyn Dodgers	71	81	.467	23½	43‍–‍33	28‍–‍48
Philadelphia Phillies	56	93	.376	37	35‍–‍36	21‍–‍57
Cincinnati Reds	52	99	.344	42	30‍–‍47	22‍–‍52

=== Record vs. opponents ===
1934 National League record Sources:
Team	BSN	BRO	CHC	CIN	NYG	PHI	PIT	STL
Boston	—	16–6–1	12–10	15–7	7–15	14–8	9–11	5–16
Brooklyn	6–16–1	—	8–12	13–9	8–14	13–9	16–6	7–15
Chicago	10–12	12–8	—	14–8	11–10	13–9	14–8–1	12–10
Cincinnati	7–15	9–13	8–14	—	6–16	9–10	7–15	6–16–1
New York	15–7	14–8	10–11	16–6	—	15–7	14–8	9–13
Philadelphia	8–14	9–13	9–13	10–9	7–15	—	7–13	6–16
Pittsburgh	11–9	6–16	8–14–1	15–7	8–14	13–7	—	13–9
St. Louis	16–5	15–7	10–12	16–6–1	13–9	16–6	9–13	—

=== Roster ===
1934 New York Giants
Roster
Pitchers: 15 Hi Bell; 19 Joe Bowman; 14 Slick Castleman; 28 Watty Clark; 12 Freddie Fitzsimmons; 11 Carl Hubbell; 20 Dolf Luque; 18 Roy Parmelee; 25 Jack Salveson; 17 Hal Schumacher; 21 Al Smith	Catchers: 10 Harry Danning; 8 Gus Mancuso; 9 Paul Richards; Infielders: 6 Hughie Critz; 22 George Grantham; 5 Travis Jackson; 23 Blondy Ryan; 3 Bill Terry; 7 Johnny Vergez	Outfielders: 27 Hank Leiber; 1 Jo-Jo Moore; 16 Lefty O'Doul; 4 Mel Ott; 26 Homer Peel; 2 George Watkins; 22 Phil Weintraub; Other batters: 24 Fresco Thompson	Manager: 3 Bill Terry; Coaches: 31 Tommy Clarke; 32 Frank Snyder

== Player stats ==
=== Batting ===
==== Starters by position ====
Note: Pos = Position; G = Games played; AB = At bats; H = Hits; Avg. = Batting average; HR = Home runs; RBI = Runs batted in

Pos	Player	G	AB	H	Avg.	HR	RBI
C	Gus Mancuso	122	383	94	.245	7	46
1B	Bill Terry	153	602	213	.354	8	83
2B	Hughie Critz	137	571	138	.242	6	40
3B	Johnny Vergez	108	320	64	.200	7	27
SS	Travis Jackson	137	523	140	.268	16	101
OF	Mel Ott	153	582	190	.326	35	135
OF	Jo-Jo Moore	139	580	192	.331	15	61
OF	George Watkins	105	296	73	.247	6	33

==== Other batters ====
Note: G = Games played; AB = At bats; H = Hits; Avg. = Batting average; HR = Home runs; RBI = Runs batted in

Player	G	AB	H	Avg.	HR	RBI
Blondy Ryan	110	385	93	.242	2	41
Hank Leiber	63	187	45	.241	2	25
Lefty O'Doul	83	177	56	.316	9	46
Harry Danning	53	97	32	.330	1	7
Paul Richards	42	75	12	.160	0	3
Phil Weintraub	31	74	26	.351	0	15
Homer Peel	21	41	8	.195	1	3
George Grantham	32	29	7	.241	1	4
Fresco Thompson	1	1	0	.000	0	0

=== Pitching ===
==== Starting pitchers ====
Note: G = Games pitched; IP = Innings pitched; W = Wins; L = Losses; ERA = Earned run average; SO = Strikeouts

Player	G	IP	W	L	ERA	SO
Carl Hubbell	49	313.0	21	12	2.30	118
Hal Schumacher	41	297.0	23	10	3.18	112
Freddie Fitzsimmons	38	263.1	18	14	3.04	73
Roy Parmelee	22	152.2	10	6	3.42	83

==== Other pitchers ====
Note: G = Games pitched; IP = Innings pitched; W = Wins; L = Losses; ERA = Earned run average; SO = Strikeouts

Player	G	IP	W	L	ERA	SO
Joe Bowman	30	107.1	5	4	3.61	36
Jack Salveson	12	38.1	3	1	3.52	18
Watty Clark	5	18.2	1	2	6.75	6
Slick Castleman	7	16.2	1	0	5.40	5

==== Relief pitchers ====
Note: G = Games pitched; W = Wins; L = Losses; SV = Saves; ERA = Earned run average; SO = Strikeouts

Player	G	W	L	SV	ERA	SO
Al Smith	30	3	5	5	4.32	27
Dolf Luque	26	4	3	7	3.83	12
Hi Bell	22	4	3	6	3.67	9

== Farm system ==
Level	Team	League	Manager
A	Nashville Vols	Southern Association	Chuck Dressen and Lance Richbourg
C	Jacksonville Jax	West Dixie League	Wally Dashiell

LEAGUE CHAMPIONS: Jacksonville
