= 1932 Pittsburgh Pirates season =

1932 Pittsburgh Pirates
- League: National League
- Ballpark: Forbes Field
- City: Pittsburgh, Pennsylvania
- Owners: Barney Dreyfuss, Bill Benswanger
- Managers: George Gibson

The 1932 Pittsburgh Pirates season was the 51st season of the Pittsburgh Pirates franchise; the 46th in the National League. The Pirates finished second in the league standings with a record of 86–68.

== Regular season ==
The Pirates' starting lineup included four future Hall of Famers: Pie Traynor, Arky Vaughan, Lloyd Waner, and Paul Waner. At just 20 years old, Vaughan was the youngest player in the majors in 1932.

=== Season standings ===
National League
| Team | W | L | Pct. | GB | Home | Road |
|---|---|---|---|---|---|---|
| Chicago Cubs | 90 | 64 | .584 | — | 53‍–‍24 | 37‍–‍40 |
| Pittsburgh Pirates | 86 | 68 | .558 | 4 | 45‍–‍31 | 41‍–‍37 |
| Brooklyn Dodgers | 81 | 73 | .526 | 9 | 44‍–‍34 | 37‍–‍39 |
| Philadelphia Phillies | 78 | 76 | .506 | 12 | 45‍–‍32 | 33‍–‍44 |
| Boston Braves | 77 | 77 | .500 | 13 | 44‍–‍33 | 33‍–‍44 |
| St. Louis Cardinals | 72 | 82 | .468 | 18 | 42‍–‍35 | 30‍–‍47 |
| New York Giants | 72 | 82 | .468 | 18 | 37‍–‍40 | 35‍–‍42 |
| Cincinnati Reds | 60 | 94 | .390 | 30 | 33‍–‍44 | 27‍–‍50 |

=== Record vs. opponents ===
1932 National League record Sources:
| Team | BSN | BRO | CHC | CIN | NYG | PHI | PIT | STL |
|---|---|---|---|---|---|---|---|---|
| Boston | — | 15–7 | 8–14 | 9–13 | 11–11 | 11–11 | 10–12 | 13–9–1 |
| Brooklyn | 7–15 | — | 10–12 | 15–7 | 15–7 | 8–14 | 12–10 | 14–8 |
| Chicago | 14–8 | 12–10 | — | 12–10 | 15–7 | 16–6 | 9–13 | 12–10 |
| Cincinnati | 13–9 | 7–15 | 10–12 | — | 7–15 | 9–13 | 8–14 | 6–16–1 |
| New York | 11–11 | 7–15 | 7–15 | 15–7 | — | 11–11 | 7–15 | 14–8 |
| Philadelphia | 11–11 | 14–8 | 6–16 | 13–9 | 11–11 | — | 14–8 | 9–13 |
| Pittsburgh | 12–10 | 10–12 | 13–9 | 14–8 | 15–7 | 8–14 | — | 14–8 |
| St. Louis | 9–13–1 | 8–14 | 10–12 | 16–6–1 | 8–14 | 13–9 | 8–14 | — |

=== Game log ===
1932 Game Log: 86–68 (Home: 45–31; Away: 41–37)
April: 6–9 (Home: 3–3; Away: 3–6)

| # | Date | Opponent | Score | Win | Loss | Save | Attendance | Record |
|---|---|---|---|---|---|---|---|---|
| 1 | April 12 | @ Cardinals | 2–10 | Rhem | **French** (0–1) | — | 5,924 | 0–1 |
| 2 | April 13 | @ Cardinals | 8–9 | Lindsey | **Spencer** (0–1) | — | — | 0–2 |
| 3 | April 14 | @ Cardinals | 5–4 | **French** (1–1) | Derringer | — | — | 1–2 |
| 4 | April 15 | @ Cardinals | 9–7 | **Brame** (1–0) | Johnson | — | 1,988 | 2–2 |
| 5 | April 16 | @ Reds | 0–5 | Johnson | **Harris** (0–1) | — | — | 2–3 |
| 6 | April 17 | @ Reds | 4–3 | **Spencer** (1–1) | Benton | **Swift** (1) | — | 3–3 |
| 7 | April 18 | @ Reds | 0–5 | Kolp | **French** (1–2) | — | — | 3–4 |
| 8 | April 20 | Cardinals | 7–0 | **Swetonic** (1–0) | Hallahan | — | — | 4–4 |
| 9 | April 21 | Cardinals | 7–6 (10) | **French** (2–2) | Frey | — | — | 5–4 |
| 10 | April 22 | Cardinals | 3–5 (10) | Johnson | **French** (2–3) | — | — | 5–5 |
| 11 | April 23 | Cardinals | 10–9 | **Swift** (1–0) | Dean | — | — | 6–5 |
| 12 | April 24 | @ Cubs | 3–12 | Root | **Spencer** (1–2) | — | 8,000 | 6–6 |
| 13 | April 27 | @ Cubs | 4–8 | Malone | **Swetonic** (1–1) | — | — | 6–7 |
| 14 | April 28 | Reds | 6–7 | Ogden | **French** (2–4) | — | — | 6–8 |
| 15 | April 29 | Reds | 4–6 | Rixey | **Brame** (1–1) | — | — | 6–9 |

May: 14–11 (Home: 7–8; Away: 7–3)

| # | Date | Opponent | Score | Win | Loss | Save | Attendance | Record |
|---|---|---|---|---|---|---|---|---|
| 16 | May 1 | @ Reds | 5–7 | Lucas | **French** (2–5) | — | 21,000 | 6–10 |
| 17 | May 2 | Cubs | 2–0 | **Swetonic** (2–1) | Malone | — | — | 7–10 |
| 18 | May 3 | Cubs | 6–8 | Smith | **Swift** (1–1) | — | — | 7–11 |
| 19 | May 4 | Cubs | 1–4 | Warneke | **French** (2–6) | — | — | 7–12 |
| 20 | May 6 | Phillies | 2–4 | Elliott | **Harris** (0–2) | — | — | 7–13 |
| 21 | May 7 | Phillies | 3–5 | Hansen | **Spencer** (1–3) | Benge | — | 7–14 |
| 22 | May 9 | Braves | 5–6 (12) | Frankhouse | **French** (2–7) | Cantwell | — | 7–15 |
| 23 | May 15 | @ Dodgers | 2–0 | **Swetonic** (3–1) | Shaute | — | 25,000 | 8–15 |
| 24 | May 16 | Dodgers | 1–11 | Mungo | **French** (2–8) | — | — | 8–16 |
| 25 | May 17 | Dodgers | 3–1 | **Harris** (1–2) | Phelps | — | — | 9–16 |
| 26 | May 18 | Dodgers | 2–4 | Clark | **Swift** (1–2) | — | — | 9–17 |
| 27 | May 19 | Dodgers | 3–2 | **Chagnon** (1–0) | Shaute | — | — | 10–17 |
| 28 | May 20 | @ Cardinals | 5–0 | **French** (3–8) | Derringer | — | — | 11–17 |
| 29 | May 22 | @ Cardinals | 5–1 | **Swetonic** (4–1) | Dean | — | — | 12–17 |
| 30 | May 22 | @ Cardinals | 3–5 | Hallahan | **Harris** (1–3) | — | — | 12–18 |
| 31 | May 24 | @ Reds | 5–3 (12) | **Spencer** (2–3) | Frey | — | — | 13–18 |
| 32 | May 25 | @ Reds | 9–4 | **Kremer** (1–0) | Carroll | **Swift** (2) | — | 14–18 |
| 33 | May 26 | @ Reds | 3–2 | **Harris** (2–3) | Lucas | **Swift** (3) | 11,633 | 15–18 |
| 34 | May 27 | Cardinals | 8–4 | **French** (4–8) | Haines | — | — | 16–18 |
| 35 | May 28 | Cardinals | 8–6 | **Swetonic** (5–1) | Dean | — | — | 17–18 |
| 36 | May 29 | @ Cubs | 3–7 | Malone | **Chagnon** (1–1) | — | — | 17–19 |
| 37 | May 29 | @ Cubs | 2–0 | **Spencer** (3–3) | Smith | — | 36,000 | 18–19 |
| 38 | May 30 | Reds | 2–4 | Rixey | **Harris** (2–4) | — | — | 18–20 |
| 39 | May 30 | Reds | 5–2 | **Swift** (2–2) | Benton | — | — | 19–20 |
| 40 | May 31 | Reds | 4–1 | **French** (5–8) | Lucas | — | — | 20–20 |

June: 14–7 (Home: 6–1; Away: 8–6)

| # | Date | Opponent | Score | Win | Loss | Save | Attendance | Record |
|---|---|---|---|---|---|---|---|---|
| 41 | June 2 | Cubs | 5–9 | Root | **Spencer** (3–4) | — | — | 20–21 |
| 42 | June 3 | Cubs | 6–5 (11) | **Swetonic** (6–1) | May | — | — | 21–21 |
| 43 | June 4 | Cubs | 12–4 | **Meine** (1–0) | Grimes | — | — | 22–21 |
| 44 | June 7 | @ Phillies | 7–4 | **French** (6–8) | Hansen | — | — | 23–21 |
| 45 | June 8 | @ Phillies | 10–11 | Berly | **Spencer** (3–5) | Benge | — | 23–22 |
| 46 | June 9 | @ Phillies | 4–3 | **Swetonic** (7–1) | Holley | **French** (1) | — | 24–22 |
| 47 | June 10 | @ Phillies | 5–6 | Benge | **Meine** (1–1) | — | — | 24–23 |
| 48 | June 11 | @ Giants | 4–6 | Walker | **French** (6–9) | — | — | 24–24 |
| 49 | June 15 | @ Braves | 5–2 | **Swift** (3–2) | Brandt | — | — | 25–24 |
| 50 | June 18 | @ Braves | 2–0 (11) | **Swetonic** (8–1) | Brown | — | — | 26–24 |
| 51 | June 18 | @ Braves | 1–2 | Betts | **Kremer** (1–1) | — | — | 26–25 |
| 52 | June 19 | @ Dodgers | 2–1 | **Meine** (2–1) | Clark | **Swift** (4) | 18,000 | 27–25 |
| 53 | June 20 | @ Dodgers | 1–2 | Mungo | **Harris** (2–5) | — | — | 27–26 |
| 54 | June 21 | @ Dodgers | 2–9 | Heimach | **Swift** (3–3) | — | — | 27–27 |
| 55 | June 22 | @ Dodgers | 7–6 | **French** (7–9) | Shaute | **Spencer** (1) | — | 28–27 |
| 56 | June 24 | Reds | 4–3 | **Meine** (3–1) | Rixey | — | — | 29–27 |
| 57 | June 25 | Reds | 5–4 (11) | **Swift** (4–3) | Lucas | — | — | 30–27 |
| 58 | June 25 | Reds | 8–5 | **Kremer** (2–1) | Kolp | **Meine** (1) | — | 31–27 |
| 59 | June 26 | @ Reds | 5–0 | **French** (8–9) | Johnson | — | — | 32–27 |
| 60 | June 26 | @ Reds | 9–5 | **Swift** (5–3) | Carroll | — | — | 33–27 |
| 61 | June 30 | Cardinals | 9–6 | **Swift** (6–3) | Stout | — | — | 34–27 |

July: 25–13 (Home: 16–9; Away: 9–4)

| # | Date | Opponent | Score | Win | Loss | Save | Attendance | Record |
|---|---|---|---|---|---|---|---|---|
| 62 | July 1 | Cardinals | 3–5 | Dean | **Swetonic** (8–2) | Lindsey | — | 34–28 |
| 63 | July 2 | Cardinals | 4–5 | Hallahan | **Kremer** (2–2) | — | — | 34–29 |
| 64 | July 3 | @ Cubs | 5–4 (6) | **Meine** (4–1) | Malone | — | 18,000 | 35–29 |
| 65 | July 4 | Cubs | 9–6 | **Harris** (3–5) | Grimes | — | — | 36–29 |
| 66 | July 4 | Cubs | 6–5 (11) | **Chagnon** (2–1) | Bush | — | — | 37–29 |
| 67 | July 5 | Giants | 4–3 (10) | **Swift** (7–3) | Walker | — | — | 38–29 |
| 68 | July 6 | Giants | 4–2 | **Swetonic** (9–2) | Mooney | — | — | 39–29 |
| 69 | July 6 | Giants | 3–1 | **French** (9–9) | Luque | — | — | 40–29 |
| 70 | July 7 | Giants | 3–4 | Hoyt | **Meine** (4–2) | — | — | 40–30 |
| 71 | July 8 | Giants | 8–7 | **Chagnon** (3–1) | Mooney | — | — | 41–30 |
| 72 | July 9 | Dodgers | 3–9 | Vance | **Harris** (3–6) | — | — | 41–31 |
| 73 | July 10 | @ Dodgers | 8–7 | **Swift** (8–3) | Quinn | — | 15,000 | 42–31 |
| 74 | July 11 | Dodgers | 5–3 | **Swetonic** (10–2) | Heimach | — | — | 43–31 |
| 75 | July 12 | Dodgers | 8–7 (12) | **Harris** (4–6) | Moore | — | — | 44–31 |
| 76 | July 13 | Braves | 1–5 | Brandt | **French** (9–10) | — | — | 44–32 |
| 77 | July 13 | Braves | 5–10 | Zachary | **Chagnon** (3–2) | — | — | 44–33 |
| 78 | July 14 | Braves | 6–1 | **Swift** (9–3) | Seibold | — | — | 45–33 |
| 79 | July 15 | Braves | 1–0 | **Kremer** (3–2) | Pruett | — | — | 46–33 |
| 80 | July 16 | Braves | 2–1 | **Meine** (5–2) | Betts | — | — | 47–33 |
| 81 | July 16 | Braves | 9–8 (10) | **Chagnon** (4–2) | Brandt | — | — | 48–33 |
| 82 | July 18 | Phillies | 4–5 (11) | Collins | **French** (9–11) | — | — | 48–34 |
| 83 | July 19 | Phillies | 5–2 | **Swift** (10–3) | Hansen | — | — | 49–34 |
| 84 | July 19 | Phillies | 5–6 (11) | Collins | **Harris** (4–7) | — | — | 49–35 |
| 85 | July 20 | Phillies | 2–6 | Holley | **Meine** (5–3) | — | — | 49–36 |
| 86 | July 21 | Phillies | 3–2 | **Kremer** (4–2) | Elliott | — | — | 50–36 |
| 87 | July 22 | Cubs | 3–1 | **Swetonic** (11–2) | Malone | — | — | 51–36 |
| 88 | July 23 | Cubs | 11–8 | **Brame** (2–1) | Smith | **Harris** (1) | — | 52–36 |
| 89 | July 24 | @ Cubs | 2–7 | Warneke | **Meine** (5–4) | — | — | 52–37 |
| 90 | July 24 | @ Cubs | 7–5 | **Harris** (5–7) | Bush | — | 48,000 | 53–37 |
| 91 | July 26 | @ Giants | 3–7 | Hubbell | **French** (9–12) | — | 20,000 | 53–38 |
| 92 | July 26 | @ Giants | 7–5 (10) | **Chagnon** (5–2) | Schumacher | — | 20,000 | 54–38 |
| 93 | July 27 | @ Giants | 9–8 | **Harris** (6–7) | Gibson | **French** (2) | — | 55–38 |
| 94 | July 27 | @ Giants | 4–2 | **Harris** (7–7) | Hoyt | — | — | 56–38 |
| 95 | July 28 | @ Giants | 10–7 | **Brame** (3–1) | Fitzsimmons | **French** (3) | 10,000 | 57–38 |
| 96 | July 28 | @ Giants | 9–1 | **Meine** (6–4) | Bell | — | — | 58–38 |

August: 10–20 (Home: 9–10; Away: 1–10)

| # | Date | Opponent | Score | Win | Loss | Save | Attendance | Record |
|---|---|---|---|---|---|---|---|---|
| 100 | August 1 | @ Phillies | 5–18 | Rhem | **Meine** (6–5) | — | — | 59–41 |
| 101 | August 2 | @ Phillies | 6–11 | Elliott | **French** (9–13) | Hansen | — | 59–42 |
| 102 | August 4 | @ Dodgers | 4–7 | Clark | **Swetonic** (11–3) | — | — | 59–43 |
| 103 | August 4 | @ Dodgers | 5–6 (10) | Thurston | **Swift** (10–5) | — | 25,000 | 59–44 |
| 104 | August 6 | @ Dodgers | 1–2 | Heimach | **Meine** (6–6) | — | 10,000 | 59–45 |
| 105 | August 7 | @ Braves | 1–2 | Brandt | **Swetonic** (11–4) | — | — | 59–46 |
| 106 | August 7 | @ Braves | 6–7 | Cantwell | **Swift** (10–6) | — | 29,000 | 59–47 |
| 107 | August 9 | @ Braves | 0–4 | Betts | **Kremer** (4–3) | — | — | 59–48 |
| 108 | August 10 | @ Braves | 5–2 | **Meine** (7–6) | Zachary | — | — | 60–48 |
| 109 | August 10 | @ Braves | 2–3 | Brandt | **French** (9–14) | — | — | 60–49 |
| 110 | August 11 | Cubs | 2–3 (10) | Bush | **Swetonic** (11–5) | — | — | 60–50 |
| 111 | August 13 | Reds | 0–3 | Rixey | **Swift** (10–7) | — | — | 60–51 |
| 112 | August 15 | Dodgers | 6–11 | Shaute | **Meine** (7–7) | — | — | 60–52 |
| 113 | August 16 | Dodgers | 4–0 | **French** (10–14) | Clark | — | — | 61–52 |
| 114 | August 17 | Dodgers | 1–4 | Heimach | **Swift** (10–8) | Mungo | — | 61–53 |
| 115 | August 19 | Giants | 4–10 | Hubbell | **Meine** (7–8) | — | 6,000 | 61–54 |
| 116 | August 20 | Giants | 3–2 | **French** (11–14) | Walker | — | — | 62–54 |
| 117 | August 20 | Giants | 1–8 | Bell | **Harris** (8–8) | — | — | 62–55 |
| 118 | August 21 | @ Reds | 0–2 | Rixey | **Swift** (10–9) | — | — | 62–56 |
| 119 | August 22 | Giants | 6–1 | **Meine** (8–8) | Mooney | — | — | 63–56 |
| 120 | August 22 | Giants | 3–4 | Hoyt | **Chagnon** (5–3) | — | — | 63–57 |
| 121 | August 23 | Giants | 4–3 | **French** (12–14) | Hubbell | — | — | 64–57 |
| 122 | August 24 | Phillies | 6–9 | Collins | **Spencer** (3–7) | — | — | 64–58 |
| 123 | August 25 | Phillies | 3–11 | Hansen | **Meine** (8–9) | — | — | 64–59 |
| 124 | August 25 | Phillies | 5–6 (10) | Elliott | **French** (12–15) | — | — | 64–60 |
| 125 | August 26 | Phillies | 8–0 | **Chagnon** (6–3) | Collins | — | — | 65–60 |
| 126 | August 27 | Braves | 7–4 | **French** (13–15) | Brandt | — | — | 66–60 |
| 127 | August 30 | Braves | 10–7 | **Harris** (9–8) | Brandt | **French** (4) | — | 67–60 |
| 128 | August 30 | Braves | 3–2 | **Swift** (11–9) | Frankhouse | — | — | 68–60 |
| 129 | August 31 | Braves | 2–1 | **Chagnon** (7–3) | Betts | — | — | 69–60 |

September: 17–8 (Home: 4–0; Away: 13–8)

| # | Date | Opponent | Score | Win | Loss | Save | Attendance | Record |
|---|---|---|---|---|---|---|---|---|
| 130 | September 2 | Reds | 2–1 | **French** (14–15) | Lucas | — | — | 70–60 |
| 131 | September 3 | Reds | 7–1 | **Swift** (12–9) | Rixey | — | — | 71–60 |
| 132 | September 4 | @ Reds | 5–2 | **Chagnon** (8–3) | Benton | **Harris** (2) | — | 72–60 |
| 133 | September 5 | Cardinals | 4–3 | **Meine** (9–9) | Stout | — | — | 73–60 |
| 134 | September 5 | Cardinals | 3–1 | **French** (15–15) | Derringer | — | — | 74–60 |
| 135 | September 7 | @ Dodgers | 8–3 | **Swift** (13–9) | Mungo | — | 12,500 | 75–60 |
| 136 | September 7 | @ Dodgers | 2–4 | Heimach | **Harris** (9–9) | — | 12,500 | 75–61 |
| 137 | September 8 | @ Dodgers | 2–12 | Clark | **Chagnon** (8–4) | — | 1,000 | 75–62 |
| 138 | September 10 | @ Phillies | 5–2 | **French** (16–15) | Hansen | — | — | 76–62 |
| 139 | September 10 | @ Phillies | 5–4 | **Meine** (10–9) | Elliott | — | — | 77–62 |
| 140 | September 12 | @ Phillies | 4–2 | **Swift** (14–9) | Rhem | — | — | 78–62 |
| 141 | September 13 | @ Braves | 0–3 | Brandt | **Chagnon** (8–5) | — | — | 78–63 |
| 142 | September 14 | @ Braves | 2–5 | Brown | **French** (16–16) | — | — | 78–64 |
| 143 | September 15 | @ Braves | 3–2 | **Meine** (11–9) | Betts | — | — | 79–64 |
| 144 | September 17 | @ Giants | 4–7 | Walker | **Swift** (14–10) | Luque | — | 79–65 |
| 145 | September 18 | @ Giants | 7–4 | **French** (17–16) | Schumacher | — | 15,000 | 80–65 |
| 146 | September 18 | @ Giants | 6–3 | **Chagnon** (9–5) | Parmelee | — | 15,000 | 81–65 |
| 147 | September 20 | @ Cubs | 2–5 | Bush | **Swetonic** (11–6) | — | — | 81–66 |
| 148 | September 20 | @ Cubs | 5–0 | **Meine** (12–9) | Tinning | — | — | 82–66 |
| 149 | September 21 | @ Cubs | 9–6 | **Spencer** (4–7) | Herrmann | — | — | 83–66 |
| 150 | September 22 | @ Cubs | 7–0 | **Smith** (1–0) | Grimes | — | — | 84–66 |
| 151 | September 23 | @ Cardinals | 4–8 | Derringer | **Chagnon** (9–6) | — | — | 84–67 |
| 152 | September 24 | @ Cardinals | 7–4 | **French** (18–16) | Winford | — | — | 85–67 |
| 153 | September 25 | @ Cardinals | 7–1 | **Harris** (10–9) | Starr | — | — | 86–67 |
| 154 | September 25 | @ Cardinals | 4–7 | Dean | **Spencer** (4–8) | — | — | 86–68 |

Legend: = Win = Loss
Bold = Pirates team member

=== Roster ===
1932 Pittsburgh Pirates
**Roster**
| **Pitchers**: 48 Erv Brame; 46 Leon Chagnon; 42 Larry French; 44 Bill Harris; 40 Ray Kremer; 41 Heinie Meine; -- Hal Smith; 47 Glenn Spencer; 43 Steve Swetonic; 45 Bill Swift | **Catchers**: -- Bill Brenzel; 32 Hal Finney; 30 Earl Grace; 31 Tom Padden; **Infielders**: 25 Bill Brubaker; 26 Howdy Groskloss; 22 Tony Piet; 24 Gus Suhr; 25 Tommy Thevenow; 20 Pie Traynor; 21 Arky Vaughan | **Outfielders**: 14 Dave Barbee; 12 Adam Comorosky; 15 Gus Dugas; -- Woody Jensen; 10 Lloyd Waner; 11 Paul Waner | **Manager**: 33 George Gibson; **Coaches**: 34 Doc Crandall; 35 Grover Hartley |

== Player stats ==
=== Batting ===
==== Starters by position ====
Note: Pos = Position; G = Games played; AB = At bats; H = Hits; Avg. = Batting average; HR = Home runs; RBI = Runs batted in

| Pos | Player | G | AB | H | Avg. | HR | RBI |
|---|---|---|---|---|---|---|---|
| C | Earl Grace | 115 | 390 | 107 | .274 | 8 | 55 |
| 1B | Gus Suhr | 154 | 581 | 153 | .263 | 5 | 81 |
| 2B | Tony Piet | 154 | 574 | 162 | .282 | 7 | 85 |
| 3B | Pie Traynor | 135 | 513 | 169 | .329 | 2 | 68 |
| SS | Arky Vaughan | 129 | 497 | 158 | .318 | 4 | 61 |
| OF | Lloyd Waner | 134 | 565 | 188 | .333 | 2 | 38 |
| OF | Paul Waner | 154 | 630 | 215 | .341 | 8 | 82 |
| OF | Adam Comorosky | 108 | 370 | 106 | .286 | 4 | 46 |

==== Other batters ====
Note: G = Games played; AB = At bats; H = Hits; Avg. = Batting average; HR = Home runs; RBI = Runs batted in

| Player | G | AB | H | Avg. | HR | RBI |
|---|---|---|---|---|---|---|
| Dave Barbee | 97 | 327 | 84 | .257 | 5 | 55 |
| Tommy Thevenow | 59 | 194 | 46 | .237 | 0 | 26 |
| Tom Padden | 47 | 118 | 31 | .263 | 0 | 10 |
| Gus Dugas | 55 | 97 | 23 | .237 | 3 | 12 |
| Hal Finney | 31 | 33 | 7 | .212 | 0 | 4 |
| Bill Brubaker | 7 | 24 | 10 | .417 | 0 | 4 |
| Bill Brenzel | 9 | 24 | 1 | .042 | 0 | 2 |
| Howdy Groskloss | 17 | 20 | 2 | .100 | 0 | 0 |
| Woody Jensen | 5 | 5 | 0 | .000 | 0 | 0 |

=== Pitching ===
==== Starting pitchers ====
Note: G = Games pitched; IP = Innings pitched; W = Wins; L = Losses; ERA = Earned run average; SO = Strikeouts

| Player | G | IP | W | L | ERA | SO |
|---|---|---|---|---|---|---|
| Larry French | 47 | 274.1 | 18 | 16 | 3.02 | 72 |
| Heinie Meine | 28 | 172.1 | 12 | 9 | 3.86 | 32 |
| Steve Swetonic | 24 | 162.2 | 11 | 6 | 2.82 | 39 |
| Ray Kremer | 11 | 56.2 | 4 | 3 | 4.29 | 6 |

==== Other pitchers ====
Note: G = Games pitched; IP = Innings pitched; W = Wins; L = Losses; ERA = Earned run average; SO = Strikeouts

| Player | G | IP | W | L | ERA | SO |
|---|---|---|---|---|---|---|
| Bill Swift | 39 | 214.1 | 14 | 10 | 3.61 | 64 |
| Bill Harris | 37 | 168.0 | 10 | 9 | 3.64 | 63 |
| Glenn Spencer | 39 | 137.2 | 4 | 8 | 4.97 | 35 |
| Leon Chagnon | 30 | 128.0 | 9 | 6 | 3.94 | 52 |
| Hal Smith | 2 | 12.0 | 1 | 0 | 0.75 | 4 |

==== Relief pitchers ====
Note: G = Games pitched; W = Wins; L = Losses; SV = Saves; ERA = Earned run average; SO = Strikeouts

| Player | G | W | L | SV | ERA | SO |
|---|---|---|---|---|---|---|
| Erv Brame | 23 | 3 | 1 | 0 | 7.41 | 10 |

== Awards and honors ==
=== League top five finishers ===
Tony Piet

- #2 in NL in stolen bases (19)

Steve Swetonic

- #4 in NL in ERA (2.82)

Paul Waner

- #4 in NL in batting average (.341)
- #4 in NL in hits (215)

== Farm system ==
| Level | Team | League | Manager |
|---|---|---|---|
| A | Tulsa Oilers | Western League | Art Griggs |

LEAGUE CHAMPIONS: Tulsa
