= 1932 in baseball =

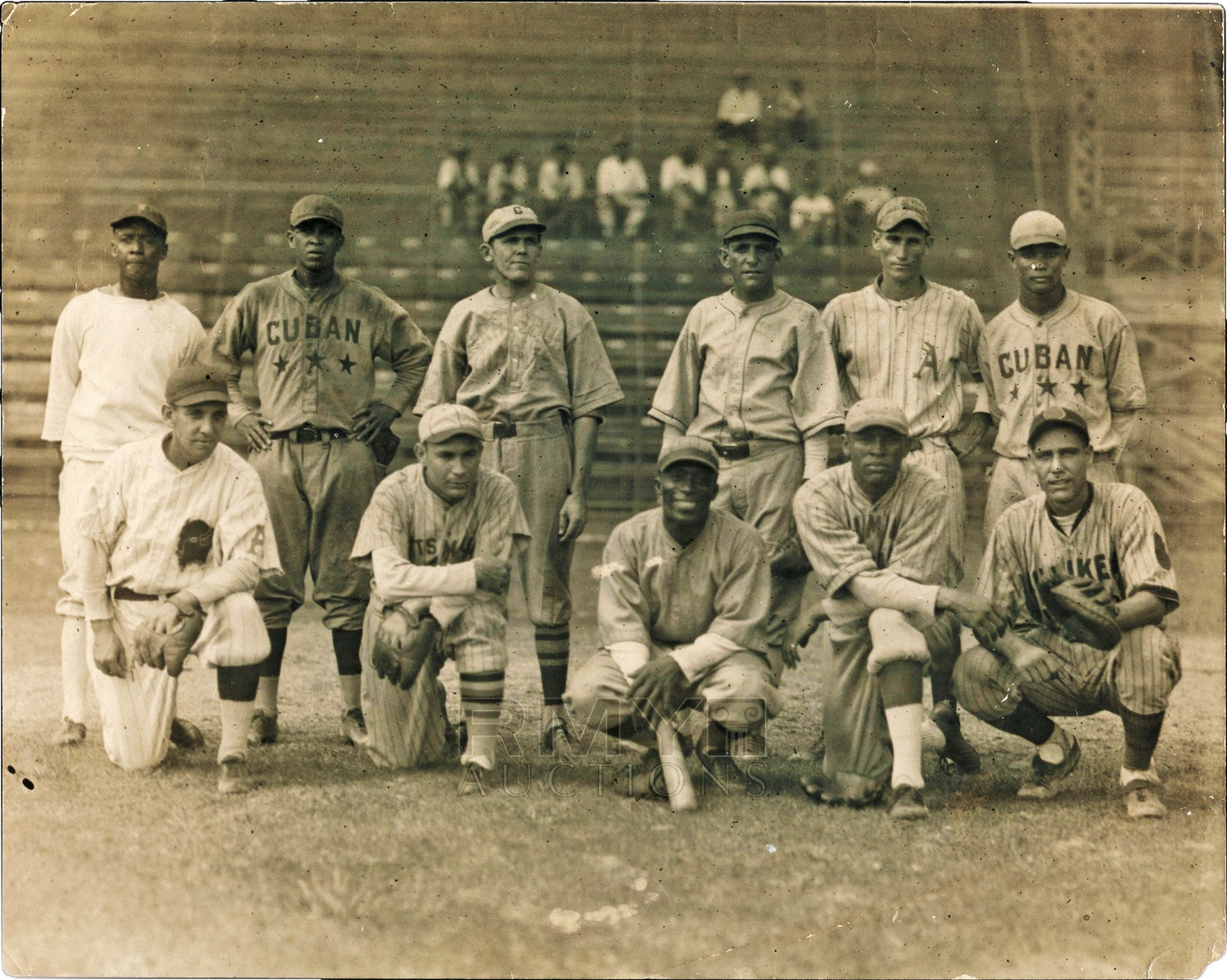
Various players in a group photo, 1932

The following are the baseball events of the year 1932 throughout the world.

== Champions ==
- World Series: New York Yankees over Chicago Cubs (4–0)

== Awards and honors ==
- MLB Most Valuable Player Award
  - Jimmie Foxx, Philadelphia Athletics, 1B
  - Chuck Klein, Philadelphia Phillies, OF

== Statistical leaders ==
Any team shown in small text indicates a previous team a player was on during the season.

| | American League | | National League | | East–West League | | Negro Southern League | |
| Stat | Player | Total | Player | Total | Player | Total | Player | Total |
|---|---|---|---|---|---|---|---|---|
| AVG | Dale Alexander (BOS/DET) | .367 | Lefty O'Doul (BRO) | .368 | Dick Lundy (BBS) | .381 | Leroy Morney (MON) | .378 |
| HR | Jimmie Foxx (PHA) | 58 | Chuck Klein (PHI); Mel Ott (NYG) | 38 | Tom Finley (BBS) | 7 | Steel Arm Davis (CAG); Turkey Stearnes (CAG) | 4 |
| RBI | Jimmie Foxx (PHA) | 169 | Don Hurst (PHI) | 143 | Mule Suttles (WPI/DTW) | 48 | Roy Parnell (MON) | 50 |
| W | Alvin Crowder (WSH) | 26 | Lon Warneke (CHC) | 22 | Bertrum Hunter (HOM/DTW) | 10 | Dick Matthews (MON) | 11 |
| ERA | Lefty Grove (PHA) | 2.84 | Lon Warneke (CHC) | 2.37 | Joseph Strong (HOM) | 2.07 | Roy Parnell (MON) | 0.83 |
| K | Red Ruffing (NYY) | 190 | Dizzy Dean (STL) | 191 | Bertrum Hunter (HOM/DTW) | 72 | Barney Morris (MON) | 81 |

== Major league baseball final standings ==
=== American League final standings ===
American League
| Team | W | L | Pct. | GB | Home | Road |
|---|---|---|---|---|---|---|
| New York Yankees | 107 | 47 | .695 | — | 62‍–‍15 | 45‍–‍32 |
| Philadelphia Athletics | 94 | 60 | .610 | 13 | 51‍–‍26 | 43‍–‍34 |
| Washington Senators | 93 | 61 | .604 | 14 | 51‍–‍26 | 42‍–‍35 |
| Cleveland Indians | 87 | 65 | .572 | 19 | 43‍–‍33 | 44‍–‍32 |
| Detroit Tigers | 76 | 75 | .503 | 29½ | 42‍–‍34 | 34‍–‍41 |
| St. Louis Browns | 63 | 91 | .409 | 44 | 33‍–‍42 | 30‍–‍49 |
| Chicago White Sox | 49 | 102 | .325 | 56½ | 28‍–‍49 | 21‍–‍53 |
| Boston Red Sox | 43 | 111 | .279 | 64 | 27‍–‍50 | 16‍–‍61 |

Locations of teams for the 1932 American League season
American League

=== National League final standings ===
National League
| Team | W | L | Pct. | GB | Home | Road |
|---|---|---|---|---|---|---|
| Chicago Cubs | 90 | 64 | .584 | — | 53‍–‍24 | 37‍–‍40 |
| Pittsburgh Pirates | 86 | 68 | .558 | 4 | 45‍–‍31 | 41‍–‍37 |
| Brooklyn Dodgers | 81 | 73 | .526 | 9 | 44‍–‍34 | 37‍–‍39 |
| Philadelphia Phillies | 78 | 76 | .506 | 12 | 45‍–‍32 | 33‍–‍44 |
| Boston Braves | 77 | 77 | .500 | 13 | 44‍–‍33 | 33‍–‍44 |
| St. Louis Cardinals | 72 | 82 | .468 | 18 | 42‍–‍35 | 30‍–‍47 |
| New York Giants | 72 | 82 | .468 | 18 | 37‍–‍40 | 35‍–‍42 |
| Cincinnati Reds | 60 | 94 | .390 | 30 | 33‍–‍44 | 27‍–‍50 |

Locations of teams for the 1932–1935 National League seasons
National League

== Negro leagues final standings ==
All Negro leagues standings below are per MLB and Seamheads.

=== East–West League standings ===
| vs. East–West League | | | | | | vs. Major Black teams | | | |
| East–West League | W | L | T | Pct. | GB | W | L | T | Pct. |
|---|---|---|---|---|---|---|---|---|---|
| Detroit Wolves | 20 | 5 | 0 | .800 | — | 28 | 9 | 0 | .757 |
| Homestead Grays | 19 | 11 | 1 | .629 | 3½ | 44 | 33 | 1 | .571 |
| Baltimore Black Sox | 24 | 17 | 0 | .585 | 4 | 36 | 33 | 0 | .522 |
| Pollock's Cuban Stars | 11 | 13 | 0 | .458 | 8½ | 22 | 21 | 0 | .512 |
| Hilldale Club | 11 | 16 | 0 | .407 | 10 | 11 | 21 | 0 | .344 |
| Washington Pilots | 13 | 22 | 0 | .371 | 12 | 24 | 41 | 0 | .369 |
| Cleveland Stars | 5 | 13 | 1 | .289 | 11½ | 11 | 16 | 1 | .411 |
| Newark Browns | 0 | 6 | 0 | .000 | 10½ | 0 | 6 | 0 | .000 |

Locations of teams for the 1932 East–West League season
East–West League
Traveling team: Pollock's Cuban Stars

=== Negro Southern League standings ===
1932 was the only time the Negro Southern League was considered a major league. Chicago won the first half while Nashville won the second half. They matched up against each other in a best-of-seven postseason series, which Chicago won four to three.

| vs. Negro Southern League | | | | | | vs. Major Black teams | | | |
| Negro Southern League | W | L | T | Pct. | GB | W | L | T | Pct. |
|---|---|---|---|---|---|---|---|---|---|
| ^{(1)} Chicago American Giants | 33 | 10 | 0 | .767 | — | 50 | 32 | 0 | .610 |
| Monroe Monarchs | 34 | 14 | 0 | .708 | 1½ | 42 | 20 | 1 | .675 |
| ^{(2)} Nashville Elite Giants | 24 | 22 | 0 | .522 | 10½ | 26 | 27 | 0 | .491 |
| Birmingham Black Barons | 10 | 9 | 0 | .526 | 11 | 12 | 15 | 0 | .444 |
| Montgomery Grey Sox | 22 | 24 | 1 | .479 | 12½ | 22 | 24 | 1 | .479 |
| Memphis Red Sox | 23 | 27 | 0 | .460 | 13½ | 29 | 28 | 0 | .509 |
| Indianapolis ABCs | 16 | 20 | 4 | .450 | 13½ | 25 | 32 | 4 | .443 |
| Columbus Turf Club | 3 | 5 | 2 | .400 | 12½ | 3 | 5 | 2 | .400 |
| Louisville Black Caps | 12 | 27 | 1 | .313 | 19 | 12 | 31 | 1 | .284 |
| Little Rock Grays | 4 | 11 | 0 | .267 | 15 | 8 | 11 | 0 | .421 |
| Atlanta Black Crackers | 5 | 17 | 0 | .227 | 17½ | 6 | 18 | 0 | .250 |

Locations of teams for the 1932 Negro Southern League season.

=== Independent teams final standings ===
A loose confederation of teams existed that were not part of either established leagues.

vs. All Teams
| Independent Clubs | W | L | T | Pct. | GB |
|---|---|---|---|---|---|
| Kansas City Monarchs | 13 | 5 | 0 | .722 | 5½ |
| Cuban Stars (East) | 4 | 2 | 0 | .667 | 8½ |
| Pittsburgh Crawfords | 55 | 36 | 2 | .602 | — |
| New York Black Yankees | 17 | 14 | 1 | .547 | 8 |
| Philadelphia Bacharach Giants | 2 | 3 | 0 | .400 | 10 |
| Donaldson's All Stars | 1 | 6 | 0 | .143 | 12 |
| Foster Memorial Giants / Cleveland Cubs | 1 | 15 | 0 | .063 | 16½ |

== Events ==
=== January–May ===
- January 23 – The St. Louis Cardinals trade Hack Wilson to the Brooklyn Dodgers for a minor leaguer and $45,000.
- February 27 – Waite Hoyt joins the Brooklyn Dodgers.
- March 14 – The Brooklyn Dodgers trade Wally Gilbert, Babe Herman and Ernie Lombardi to the Cincinnati Reds for Tony Cuccinello, Joe Stripp and Clyde Sukeforth.
- April 11 – The first game of the season goes extra innings. Heinie Manush's tenth inning double carries the Washington Senators to a 1–0 victory over the Boston Red Sox.
- April 17 – New York Giants First baseman Bill Terry ties a National League record with 21 putouts in the New York Giants' 6–0 victory over the Boston Braves.
- May 12 – Carey Selph of the Chicago White Sox collects his ninth strikeout of the season. But it won't happen again. Selph will go another 89 games without striking out, to set a major league record, hitting a .283 average in 396 at-bats in his second and last season. Selph's record will last until 1958 when another White Sox, Nellie Fox, sets a new mark with 98 consecutive games without striking out.
- May 16 – The New York Yankees defeat the Cleveland Indians, 8–0, for their fourth shut out in a row.
- May 19 – With first place in the American League on the line, the Washington Senators sweep both games from the New York Yankees to advance to first place by half a game. The Yankees, however, win the following day's game, and both games of the May 21 double header to end the series up 2.5 games. They maintain first place for the rest of the season.
- May 20 – The Pirates' Paul Waner hits four doubles, tying a major league record held by many players.
- May 30 – The New York Yankees unveil a plaque dedicated to former manager Miller Huggins. It is the first of what will eventually be a large number of plaques and other monuments to Yankee personnel.

=== June–July ===
- June 3:
  - Lou Gehrig hits four home runs and narrowly misses a fifth, while Tony Lazzeri hits for the cycle as the New York Yankees beat the Philadelphia Athletics, 20–13. Gehrig becomes the third player to accomplish the feat in Major League history and the first to do so in the American League in 36 years. The Yankees set a major league record for total bases with 50 and both teams set a still-standing record for extra bases with 41.
  - New York Giants manager John McGraw resigns. He had been the team's manager since the 1902 season.
- June 9 – In a pitchers transaction, the St. Louis Browns send Dick Coffman to the Washington Senators in exchange for Carl Fischer. Both teams trade the two hurlers back for each other on December 13.
- June 22 – National League club presidents approve the addition of numbers on player uniforms. The New York Yankees had initiated the concept in 1929 in the American League.
- June 23 – Pitcher Waite Hoyt joins the New York Giants.
- July 10 – Philadelphia Athletics, manager Connie Mack brings only two pitchers to face the Cleveland Indians. As luck would have it, Philadelphia's starter Lew Krausse is lifted after giving up four hits in the first inning, and is replaced by Eddie Rommel. A slugfest emerges, with the Athletics taking a 15–14 lead in the ninth inning only to have the Indians tie it in the bottom of the inning. The A's score two more in the sixteenth only to have Cleveland score two as well in the bottom of the inning. The A's eventually win it in eighteen, 18–17. While Rommel gives up 29 hits, he is still the winning pitcher. Johnny Burnett goes 9-for-11 for the Indians, setting a Major League record for most hits in a single game. Rommel sets a record for the most batters faced by a relief pitcher, after facing 87 batters in an 18–17, 18 innings victory over the Cleveland Indians.
- July 31 – The Cleveland Indians lose the inaugural game in Cleveland Municipal Stadium, 1–0, to the Philadelphia Athletics.

=== August–September ===
- August 2 – Rogers Hornsby is fired as manager of the Chicago Cubs.
- August 5 – Against the Washington Senators at Navin Field, Tommy Bridges of the Detroit Tigers has a bid for a perfect game broken up with two out in the ninth on a Dave Harris single. The hit is the only one Bridges allows in defeating the Senators 13–0.
- August 14 – Despite a woeful 27–85 record, the Boston Red Sox defeat the Philadelphia Athletics 2–0 behind the pitching of Johnny Welch. It is one of only two shut outs the A's endure all season (July 9 against the Chicago White Sox).
- August 17 – The New York Yankees defeat the Detroit Tigers, 8–3, for their tenth victory in a row.
- September 11 – The St. Louis Browns defeat the Boston Red Sox 7–1 in the first game of a double header to give Boston their 100th loss of the season. The BoSox come back to win the second game, but go on to lose 111 games by the end of the season.
- September 13 – The New York Yankees defeat the Cleveland Indians 9–3 for their 100th win of the season.
- September 18 – The St. Louis Browns defeat the New York Yankees 2–1. It is the eleventh time all season the Yankees are held to just one run. The Yankees are never shut out all season.
- September 19 – The Chicago White Sox lose their 100th game of the season, 9–6 to the Philadelphia Athletics.
- September 28:
  - The Chicago Cubs jump out to a 2–0 lead in game one of the 1932 World Series, however, a three-run fourth inning capped off by a two-run home run by Lou Gehrig gives the Yankees the lead, as they take game one, 12–6.
  - The Philadelphia A's sell Mule Haas, Al Simmons & Jimmy Dykes to the Chicago White Sox for $100,000.
- September 29 – The Cubs again score in the first; however, their lead is short lived, as the Yankees score two in the bottom of the inning, and go on to win 5–2.

=== October–December ===
- October 1 – Lou Gehrig hits two home runs, as does teammate Babe Ruth, as the New York Yankees defeat the Chicago Cubs, 7–5 in Game 3 of the World Series. It is Ruth's second home run that is historic. Batting against Charlie Root in the fifth inning, with two strikes, Ruth is seen to gesture, according to some toward the outfield fence, before hitting the home run. While it is not universally accepted that Ruth was predicting a home run, it is referred to as "Babe Ruth's called shot".
- October 2 – The New York Yankees defeat the Chicago Cubs, 13–6, in Game four of the World Series to win their fourth World Championship, four games to none. This would be Ruth's tenth, and final, World Series appearance.
- October 19 – The Baseball Writers' Association of America MVP awards are announced, with Athletics' Jimmie Foxx winning in the American League and Phillies' Chuck Klein in the National League.
- October 25 – Rogers Hornsby rejoins the St. Louis Cardinals.
- November 10 – Donie Bush, who managed the Minneapolis Millers to the American Association this past season, is named to manage the Cincinnati Reds the next year.
- November 22 – St. Louis Cardinals shortstop Charlie Gelbert shatters his leg in a hunting accident. He will return as a part-time infielder in 1935, playing until 1940.
- November 29 – The New York Giants release pitcher Waite Hoyt.
- December 12 – In a rarity for 1932, a three team trade is struck between the New York Giants, Philadelphia Phillies and Pittsburgh Pirates. The Phillies send Kiddo Davis to the Giants, and receive Chick Fullis from the Giants. The Giants sent Freddie Lindstrom to the Pirates, and the Pirates sent Glenn Spencer to the New York Giants and Gus Dugas to the Phillies.
- December 15 – Farm systems, originally known as "Chain store baseball" is approved by a joint meeting of American and National League owners despite objections by Baseball Commissioner Kenesaw Mountain Landis.
- December 17 – The St. Louis Cardinals trade Jim Bottomley to the Chicago Cubs for Ownie Carroll and Estel Crabtree.

== Births ==
=== January ===
- January 3 – George Piktuzis
- January 15 – Georges Maranda
- January 18 – Mike Fornieles
- January 24 – Ernie Oravetz

=== February ===
- February 6 – Bill Koski
- February 9 – Tatsuro Hirooka
- February 10 – Jim Stump
- February 15 – Footer Johnson
- February 19 – Don Taussig
- February 23 – Jim Bolger

=== March ===
- March 1 – Dom Zanni
- March 2 – Chico Fernández
- March 9:
  - Ron Kline
  - Paul Martin
- March 16 – Don Blasingame
- March 18:
  - Anna Kunkel
  - Lee Tate
- March 22:
  - Nancy DeShone
  - Al Schroll
- March 23:
  - Jack Meyer
  - Helen Nordquist
- March 25:
  - Walt Craddock
  - Woodie Held
- March 27 – Wes Covington

=== May ===
- May 1:
  - Félix Torres
  - Kazuhiro Yamauchi
- May 2 – Ed Bressoud
- May 5 – Chuck Locke
- May 6 – Charlie Rabe
- May 9:
  - Tony Bartirome
  - Tom Yewcic
- May 16:
  - Isora del Castillo
  - Mary Louise Kolanko
- May 17:
  - Billy Hoeft
  - Ozzie Virgil, Sr.
- May 21 – Earl Hersh
- May 25 – Jim Archer
- May 26:
  - Joe Altobelli
  - Delores Brumfield
- May 27 – Mack Pride
- May 28 – Carl Thomas

=== June ===
- June 1 – Chuck Templeton
- June 2 – Lou Skizas
- June 4 – John McNamara
- June 7 – Mary Moore
- June 13:
  - Tom Gastall
  - Billy Williams
- June 17 – Bennie Daniels
- June 18 – Ron Necciai
- June 20 – Cuno Barragan
- June 27 – Eddie Kasko

=== July ===
- July 9:
  - Bud Black
  - Tex Clevenger
  - Coot Veal
- July 22 – Carl Duser
- July 25 – Jack McMahan
- July 26 – Dick Brodowski
- July 27 – Johnny Kucks

=== August ===
- August 2 – John Pregenzer
- August 4 – Jim Coates
- August 6 – Donna Becker
- August 8 – Vicente Amor
- August 11 – Steve Korcheck
- August 15 – Jim Snyder
- August 24 – Hal Woodeshick
- August 27 – Jim King
- August 29:
  - Eric MacKenzie
  - Roger McCardell

=== September ===
- September 6 – Marguerite Pearson
- September 8 – Casey Wise
- September 11 – Donna Jogerst
- September 18 – Barbara Payne
- September 29 – Paul Giel
- September 30 – Johnny Podres

=== October ===
- October 2 – Maury Wills
- October 3 – Phil Clark
- October 7 – Bud Daley
- October 10 – Hal Raether
- October 13 – Dick Barone
- October 27 – Dolores Moore

=== November ===
- November 1 – Jim Pyburn
- November 6 – John Oldham
- November 7 – Dick Stuart
- November 9 – Connie Grob
- November 18 – Bob Mitchell
- November 14 – Marty Kutyna
- November 16 – Harry Chiti
- November 18 – Danny McDevitt
- November 21 – Bill Valentine
- November 24 – Betty Jane Cornett

=== December ===
- December 10 – Ed Donnelly
- December 22 – Norma Berger

== Deaths ==
=== January ===
- January 1 – Tom Parrott, 63, pitcher who played from 1893 through 1896 for the Chicago Colts, Cincinnati Reds and St. Louis Browns.
- January 5 – George Sharrott, 62, pitcher for the Brooklyn Grooms between the 1893 and 1894 seasons.
- January 17 – Mark Stewart, 42, backup catcher for the 1913 Cincinnati Reds.
- January 22 – Bob Hogan, 71, pitcher for the St. Louis Brown Stockings in the 1882 season.
- January 27 – Ed Appleton, 39, pitcher for the Brooklyn Robins in the 1915 and 1916 seasons.

=== February ===
- February 5 – Barney Dreyfuss, 66, Hall of Fame executive and owner of the Pittsburgh Pirates since 1900; the main force behind creation of the World Series in 1903; his Pirates won six National League pennants and two World Series titles (1909, 1925); constructed Forbes Field, the first modern steel and concrete ballpark (1909); previously owned the Louisville Colonels when they were a major-league team.
- February 6 – Lyman Drake, 79, outfielder for the 1884 Washington Nationals.
- February 12 – John Shearon, 61, outfielder who played with the Cleveland Spiders in the 1891 and 1896 seasons.
- February 21 – John Peters, 48, catcher for the Detroit Tigers, Cleveland Indians and Philadelphia Phillies between 1915 and 1922.

=== March ===
- March 3 – Ed Morris, 32, pitcher for the Chicago Cubs and Boston Red Sox between 1922 and 1931, who won 19 games for the last place Red Sox in 1928.
- March 7 – Bill Carrick, 58, curveball specialist pitcher for the New York Giants and the Washington Senators of the National League between 1898 and 1902, who started the most games in 1899 (43) and 1900 (41), while leading in complete games in 1899 (40) and for the most games pitched in 1900 (45).
- March 13 – Sammy Strang, 55, utility-man who played all-positions except pitcher and catcher for the New York Giants, Brooklyn Superbas, Chicago WhiteSox, Chicago Orphans and Louisville Colonels in a span of 10 years from 1896 to 1908.
- March 23 – Charles F. Daniels, 83, one of the original umpires of the National League in its inaugural 1876 season, whose umpiring career of 25 years included ten major league seasons.

=== April ===
- April 2:
  - John Graff, 65, pitcher who played for the Washington Senators during the 1893 season.
  - John Morrill, 79, versatile sort who could play every position and one of the first ten players to reach 1000 hits, who also managed the Boston Red Stockings to the 1877 National League title while batting a .319 average during the season.
- April 5 – Harry Koons, 69, third baseman who played with the Altoona Mountain City and the Chicago Browns in the 1884 season.
- April 10 – Fred Pfeffer, 72, outstanding second baseman who played from 1882 through 1907 for four National League teams, principally with the Chicago Cubs, who in 1884 became one of the first players to hit 25 home runs in a season, while leading the National League in putouts nine times, assists four times, and double plays seven times.
- April 18 – Ike Benners, 75, left fielder who played for the Brooklyn Atlantics and the Wilmington Quicksteps during the 1884 season.
- April 23 – Lon Knight, 78, right fielder and manager of Philadelphia's 1883 American Association champions.

=== May ===
- May 23 – Doug Neff, 40, infielder for the Washington Senators in the 1914 and 1915 seasons.
- May 25 – Henry Boyle, 71, pitcher who played from 1884 through 1889 for the St. Louis Maroons and Indianapolis Hoosiers.
- May 29 – Frank Lobert, 48, first baseman for the 1915 Baltimore Terrapins of the Federal League.
- May 30 – Tom Lipp, 61, pitcher for the Philadelphia Phillies during the 1897 season.

=== June ===
- June 10 – Frank Berkelbach, 78, outfielder for the 1884 Cincinnati Red Stockings.
- June 19:
  - Alonzo Breitenstein, 74, pitcher for the Philadelphia Quakers in the 1883 season.
  - Charlie Getzien, 68, German pitcher who won 145 games from 1884 to 1892 for the Detroit Wolverines, Indianapolis Hoosiers, Boston Beaneaters, Cleveland Spiders and St. Louis Browns.
- June 25 – Pop Tate, 71, catcher who played from 1885 through 1890 for the National League Boston Beaneaters and the American Association Baltimore Orioles.

=== July ===
- July 18 – Howard Freigau, 29, third baseman who played from 1922 through 1928 for the St. Louis Cardinals, Chicago Cubs, Brooklyn Robins and Boston Braves.
- July 21 – Bill Gleason, 73, shortstop for three different teams of the American Association from 1882 to 1889, and a member of three St. Louis Browns champion teams from 1885 to 1887.
- July 24 – Tom Quinn, 68, backup catcher who played for the Pittsburgh Alleghenys, Baltimore Orioles and Pittsburgh Burghers in parts of three seasons spanning 1886–1890.

=== August ===
- August 1 – Haddie Gill, 33, pitcher who played for the Cincinnati Reds during the 1923 season.
- August 2 – Dan Brouthers, 74, Hall of Fame first baseman considered the greatest slugger in the 19th century, who led the National League in home runs twice, in doubles three times, becoming the third player to hit 100 home runs and the fourth to reach 2000 hits. In addition, batted a .338 average and scored a league-leading 153 runs for the 1887 Detroit Wolverines champion team, while retiring with a .342 career average and a slugging of .519, which was the highest recorded until the 1920s.
- August 6 – Ducky Holmes, 63, outfielder and a fine hitter and basestealer for seven teams between 1895 and 1905, better known as a notorious troublemaker that led him to be suspended several times during his 10-season career.
- August 8 – Steve Bellán, 82, Cuban third baseman who played from 1868 through 1873 with four different teams, most prominently for the Troy Haymakers, who is regarded as the first Hispanic ballplayer to play in the majors.
- August 12 – Jake Boyd, 58, utility infielder/outfielder and pitcher who played from 1894 to 1896 for the Washington Senators of the National League.
- August 16 – Candy LaChance, 63, first baseman for four teams between 1893 and 1905 and a member of the 1903 Boston Americans World Series champions, who hit .280 and drove in 693 runs in 1265 career games, while leading the American League in putouts from 1902 to 1904.
- August 17 – James E. Gaffney, 64, owner of Boston's National League franchise from 1912 to 1916, responsible for nicknaming the club the Braves; under his ownership, the 1914 "Miracle Braves" won the World Series, and Braves Field was built, opening in 1915.

=== September ===
- September 6 – Frank West, 59, relief pitcher for the 1894 Boston Beaneaters.
- September 14 – Henry Jackson, 71, first baseman who played with the Indianapolis Hoosiers in 1887.
- September 15 – Harry Kane, 49, pitcher who played for the St. Louis Browns, Detroit Tigers and Philadelphia Phillies in parts of four seasons spanning 1902–1906.
- September 19 – Otto Neu, 38, shortstop for the 1917 St. Louis Browns.
- September 22 – Hughie Hearne, 59, catcher for the Brooklyn Superbas from 1901 to 1903.
- September 23 – Oliver Brown, outfield for the Brooklyn Atlantics in the 1872 and 1875 seasons.
- September 26 – Henry Gruber, 68, pitcher who played from 1887 through 1891 for the Detroit Wolverines and the Cleveland Spiders/Infants clubs.

=== October ===
- October 11 – Ed Spurney, 60, shortstop for the 1891 Pittsburgh Pirates.
- October 16 – Frank Eustace, 58, catcher for the Louisville Colonels during the 1896 season.
- October 18 – Mac MacArthur, 70, Scottish pitcher who played in 1884 for the Indianapolis Hoosiers.

=== November ===
- November 2 – Frank Cross, 59, outfielder for the 1901 Cleveland Blues of the American League.
- November 13 – Willie Clark, 60, first baseman who played from 1895 through 1899 for the New York Giants and Pittsburgh Pirates.
- November 14 – Boss Schmidt, 52, catcher who played six seasons with the Detroit Tigers from 1906 to 1911, helping them to clinch three American League pennants from 1907 to 1909.
- November 24 – Redleg Snyder, 77, outfielder who played for the 1876 Cincinnati Reds and the 1884 Wilmington Quicksteps.
- November 25 – Charlie Carr, 55, first baseman who played for six teams in three different leagues between 1898 and 1914, mostly for the Cleveland Indians and Detroit Tigers, and a member of the Indianapolis Hoosiers team that won the 1914 Federal League pennant.

=== December ===
- December 8 – Bill Gray, 61, valuable utility who played all positions except pitcher for the Philadelphia Phillies, Cincinnati Reds and Pittsburgh Pirates in a span of five seasons from 1890 to 1898.
- December 12 – Jim Long, 70, outfielder for the 1891 Baltimore Orioles and the 1893 Louisville Colonels.
- December 15 – Bill Bishop, 62, pitcher for the Pittsburgh Alleghenys and Chicago White Stockings over parts of three seasons from 1886 to 1889.
- December 27:
  - Pop Schriver, 67, solid catcher who retired a 40% of potential basestealers in a 14-season career from 1886 to 1901, while playing for the Brooklyn Grays, Chicago Colts, Reds, New York Giants, Phillies, Pirates and Cardinals.
  - Andy Piercy, 76, backup infielder who played for the 1881 Chicago White Stockings.
