= 1932 Philadelphia Phillies season =

Major League Baseball season

1932 Philadelphia Phillies
- League: National League
- Ballpark: Baker Bowl
- City: Philadelphia, Pennsylvania
- Owners: Charlie Ruch
- President: Charlie Ruch
- Managers: Burt Shotton

The 1932 Philadelphia Phillies season was the 48th in franchise history. They finished fourth in the National League with a 78–76 record. It was the Phillies' only winning season between 1917 and 1949. This was the first season the Philadelphia Phillies wore numbers on the team's uniforms, allowing staff, coaches, and spectators to more easily identify players at a distance.

Don Hurst led the National League this season with 143 runs batted in.

== Regular season ==
On August 15, 1932, the Phillies defeated a team of Grand Rapids All-Stars 2 to 0 at Ramona Park in Grand Rapids, Michigan in a mid season exhibition.

=== Season standings ===
National League
Team	W	L	Pct.	GB	Home	Road
Chicago Cubs	90	64	.584	—	53‍–‍24	37‍–‍40
Pittsburgh Pirates	86	68	.558	4	45‍–‍31	41‍–‍37
Brooklyn Dodgers	81	73	.526	9	44‍–‍34	37‍–‍39
Philadelphia Phillies	78	76	.506	12	45‍–‍32	33‍–‍44
Boston Braves	77	77	.500	13	44‍–‍33	33‍–‍44
St. Louis Cardinals	72	82	.468	18	42‍–‍35	30‍–‍47
New York Giants	72	82	.468	18	37‍–‍40	35‍–‍42
Cincinnati Reds	60	94	.390	30	33‍–‍44	27‍–‍50

=== Record vs. opponents ===
1932 National League record Sources:
Team	BSN	BRO	CHC	CIN	NYG	PHI	PIT	STL
Boston	—	15–7	8–14	9–13	11–11	11–11	10–12	13–9–1
Brooklyn	7–15	—	10–12	15–7	15–7	8–14	12–10	14–8
Chicago	14–8	12–10	—	12–10	15–7	16–6	9–13	12–10
Cincinnati	13–9	7–15	10–12	—	7–15	9–13	8–14	6–16–1
New York	11–11	7–15	7–15	15–7	—	11–11	7–15	14–8
Philadelphia	11–11	14–8	6–16	13–9	11–11	—	14–8	9–13
Pittsburgh	12–10	10–12	13–9	14–8	15–7	8–14	—	14–8
St. Louis	9–13–1	8–14	10–12	16–6–1	8–14	13–9	8–14	—

=== Roster ===
1932 Philadelphia Phillies
Roster
Pitchers: 29 Bob Adams; 16 Ray Benge; 17 Jack Berly; 20 Stew Bolen; 18 Phil Collins; 19 Clise Dudley; 20 Hal Elliott; 21 Jumbo Elliott; 28 Reggie Grabowski; 22 Snipe Hansen; 24 Ed Holley; 30 Ad Liska; 18 Chet Nichols; 25 Flint Rhem	Catchers: 7 Spud Davis; 8 Harry McCurdy; 9 Al Todd; Infielders: 2 Dick Bartell; 10 Eddie Delker; 11 Bernie Friberg; 15 Cliff Heathcote; 4 Don Hurst; 23 George Knothe; 12 Les Mallon; 5 Pinky Whitney	Outfielders: 28 Rube Bressler; 14 Fred Brickell; 1 Kiddo Davis; 3 Chuck Klein; 6 Hal Lee; 25 Russ Scarritt; Other batters: -- Doug Taitt; 20 Hugh Willingham	Manager: 26 Burt Shotton; Coaches: Newt Hunter; Jack Onslow

== Player stats ==
=== Batting ===
==== Starters by position ====
Note: Pos = Position; G = Games played; AB = At bats; H = Hits; Avg. = Batting average; HR = Home runs; RBI = Runs batted in

Pos	Player	G	AB	H	Avg.	HR	RBI
C	Spud Davis	125	402	135	.336	14	70
1B	Don Hurst	150	579	196	.339	24	143
2B	Les Mallon	103	347	90	.259	5	31
SS	Dick Bartell	154	614	189	.308	1	53
3B	Pinky Whitney	154	624	186	.298	13	124
OF	Kiddo Davis	137	576	178	.309	5	57
OF	Chuck Klein	154	650	226	.348	38	137
OF	Hal Lee	149	595	180	.303	18	85

==== Other batters ====
Note: G = Games played; AB = At bats; H = Hits; Avg. = Batting average; HR = Home runs; RBI = Runs batted in

Player	G	AB	H	Avg.	HR	RBI
Bernie Friberg	61	154	37	.240	0	14
Harry McCurdy	62	136	32	.235	1	14
Rube Bressler	27	83	19	.229	0	6
Al Todd	33	70	16	.229	0	9
Fred Brickell	45	66	22	.333	0	2
Eddie Delker	30	62	10	.161	1	7
Cliff Heathcote	30	39	11	.282	1	5
George Knothe	6	12	1	.083	0	0
Russ Scarritt	11	11	2	.182	0	0
Doug Taitt	4	2	0	.000	0	1
Hugh Willingham	4	2	0	.000	0	0

=== Pitching ===
==== Starting pitchers ====
Note: G = Games pitched; IP = Innings pitched; W = Wins; L = Losses; ERA = Earned run average; SO = Strikeouts

Player	G	IP	W	L	ERA	SO
Ed Holley	34	228.0	11	14	3.95	87
Ray Benge	41	222.1	13	12	4.05	89
Flint Rhem	26	168.2	11	7	3.74	35

==== Other pitchers ====
Note: G = Games pitched; IP = Innings pitched; W = Wins; L = Losses; ERA = Earned run average; SO = Strikeouts

Player	G	IP	W	L	ERA	SO
Snipe Hansen	39	191.0	10	10	3.72	56
Phil Collins	43	184.1	14	12	5.27	66
Jumbo Elliott	39	166.0	11	10	5.42	62
Hal Elliott	16	57.2	2	4	5.77	13

==== Relief pitchers ====
Note: G = Games pitched; W = Wins; L = Losses; SV = Saves; ERA = Earned run average; SO = Strikeouts

Player	G	W	L	SV	ERA	SO
Jack Berly	21	1	2	2	7.63	15
Reggie Grabowski	14	2	2	0	3.67	15
Clise Dudley	13	1	1	1	7.13	5
Chet Nichols Sr.	11	0	2	1	6.98	5
Ad Liska	8	2	0	1	1.69	6
Stew Bolen	5	0	0	0	2.81	3
Bob Adams	4	0	0	0	1.50	2

== Farm system ==
Level	Team	League	Manager
B	Durham Bulls	Piedmont League	Possum Whitted
