= 1932 Brooklyn Dodgers season =

1932 Brooklyn Dodgers
- League: National League
- Ballpark: Ebbets Field
- City: Brooklyn, New York
- Record: 81–73 (.526)
- League place: 3rd
- Owners: Stephen McKeever, Brooklyn Trust Company
- President: Frank York
- Managers: Max Carey

The 1932 Brooklyn Dodgers season was the first season the franchise was officially known as the Dodgers, with the name making its first appearance on some of the team's jerseys. The Dodgers nickname had been in use since the 1890s and was used interchangeably with other nicknames in media reports, particularly "Robins" in reference to longtime manager Wilbert Robinson. With Robinson's retirement after the 1931 season and the arrival of Max Carey, the nickname "Robins" was no longer used. The team wound up finishing the season in third place.

== Offseason ==
- January 23, 1932: Bob Parham (minors) and cash were traded by the Dodgers to the St. Louis Cardinals for Hack Wilson.
- March 14, 1932: Babe Herman, Wally Gilbert and Ernie Lombardi were traded by the Robins to the Cincinnati Reds for Tony Cuccinello, Joe Stripp and Clyde Sukeforth.

== Regular season ==
=== Season standings ===
National League
Team	W	L	Pct.	GB	Home	Road
Chicago Cubs	90	64	.584	—	53‍–‍24	37‍–‍40
Pittsburgh Pirates	86	68	.558	4	45‍–‍31	41‍–‍37
Brooklyn Dodgers	81	73	.526	9	44‍–‍34	37‍–‍39
Philadelphia Phillies	78	76	.506	12	45‍–‍32	33‍–‍44
Boston Braves	77	77	.500	13	44‍–‍33	33‍–‍44
St. Louis Cardinals	72	82	.468	18	42‍–‍35	30‍–‍47
New York Giants	72	82	.468	18	37‍–‍40	35‍–‍42
Cincinnati Reds	60	94	.390	30	33‍–‍44	27‍–‍50

=== Record vs. opponents ===
1932 National League record Sources:
Team	BSN	BRO	CHC	CIN	NYG	PHI	PIT	STL
Boston	—	15–7	8–14	9–13	11–11	11–11	10–12	13–9–1
Brooklyn	7–15	—	10–12	15–7	15–7	8–14	12–10	14–8
Chicago	14–8	12–10	—	12–10	15–7	16–6	9–13	12–10
Cincinnati	13–9	7–15	10–12	—	7–15	9–13	8–14	6–16–1
New York	11–11	7–15	7–15	15–7	—	11–11	7–15	14–8
Philadelphia	11–11	14–8	6–16	13–9	11–11	—	14–8	9–13
Pittsburgh	12–10	10–12	13–9	14–8	15–7	8–14	—	14–8
St. Louis	9–13–1	8–14	10–12	16–6–1	8–14	13–9	8–14	—

=== Notable transactions ===
- May 7, 1932: Danny Taylor was purchased by the Dodgers from the Chicago Cubs.

=== Roster ===
1932 Brooklyn Dodgers
Roster
Pitchers: 17 Watty Clark; 18 Fred Heimach; -- Waite Hoyt; 24 Art Jones; 24 Cy Moore; 16 Van Mungo; 19 Ray Phelps; 24 Ed Pipgras; 22 Jack Quinn; 21 Joe Shaute; 26 Fay Thomas; 20 Sloppy Thurston; 15 Dazzy Vance	Catchers: 10 Al López; 12 Val Picinich; -- Paul Richards; 11 Clyde Sukeforth; Infielders: -- Bruce Caldwell; 14 Bud Clancy; 5 Tony Cuccinello; 2 Neal Finn; 14 George Kelly; 24 Bobby Reis; 28 Dick Siebert; 8 Gordon Slade; 3 Joe Stripp; 7 Glenn Wright	Outfielders: -- Ike Boone; -- Alta Cohen; 1 Johnny Frederick; 6 Lefty O'Doul; 25 Max Rosenfeld; 9 Danny Taylor; 4 Hack Wilson; Other batters: -- Fresco Thompson	Manager: 33 Max Carey; Coaches: 32 Otto Miller; 31 Casey Stengel

== Player stats ==
=== Batting ===
==== Starters by position ====
Note: Pos = Position; G = Games played; AB = At bats; H = Hits; Avg. = Batting average; HR = Home runs; RBI = Runs batted in

Pos	Player	G	AB	H	Avg.	HR	RBI
C	Al López	126	404	111	.275	1	43
1B	George Kelly	64	202	49	.243	4	22
2B	Tony Cuccinello	154	597	168	.281	12	77
3B	Joe Stripp	138	534	162	.303	6	64
SS	Glenn Wright	127	446	122	.274	11	60
OF	Danny Taylor	105	395	128	.324	11	48
OF	Lefty O'Doul	148	595	219	.368	21	90
OF	Hack Wilson	135	481	143	.297	23	123

==== Other batters ====
Note: G = Games played; AB = At bats; H = Hits; Avg. = Batting average; HR = Home runs; RBI = Runs batted in

Player	G	AB	H	Avg.	HR	RBI
Johnny Frederick	118	384	115	.299	16	56
Gordon Slade	79	250	60	.240	1	23
Bud Clancy	53	196	60	.306	0	16
Neal Finn	65	189	45	.238	0	14
Clyde Sukeforth	59	111	26	.234	0	12
Val Picinich	41	70	18	.257	1	11
Max Rosenfeld	34	39	14	.359	2	7
Alta Cohen	9	32	5	.156	0	1
Ike Boone	13	21	3	.143	0	2
Bruce Caldwell	7	11	1	.091	0	2
Paul Richards	3	8	0	.000	0	0
Dick Siebert	6	7	2	.286	0	0
Bobby Reis	1	4	1	.250	0	0
Fresco Thompson	3	1	0	.000	0	0

=== Pitching ===
==== Starting pitchers ====
Note: G = Games pitched; IP = Innings pitched; W = Wins; L = Losses; ERA = Earned run average; SO = Strikeouts

Player	G	IP	W	L	ERA	SO
Watty Clark	40	273.0	20	12	3.49	99
Van Mungo	39	223.1	13	11	4.43	107
Dazzy Vance	27	175.2	12	11	4.20	103
Sloppy Thurston	28	153.0	12	8	4.06	35

==== Other pitchers ====
Note: G = Games pitched; IP = Innings pitched; W = Wins; L = Losses; ERA = Earned run average; SO = Strikeouts

Player	G	IP	W	L	ERA	SO
Fred Heimach	36	167.2	9	4	3.97	30
Joe Shaute	34	117.0	7	7	4.54	32
Ray Phelps	20	79.1	4	5	5.90	21
Waite Hoyt	8	26.2	1	3	7.76	7
Fay Thomas	7	17.0	0	1	7.41	9
Ed Pipgras	5	10.0	0	1	5.40	5

==== Relief pitchers ====
Note: G = Games pitched; W = Wins; L = Losses; SV = Saves; ERA = Earned run average; SO = Strikeouts

Player	G	W	L	SV	ERA	SO
Jack Quinn	42	3	7	9	3.30	28
Cy Moore	20	0	3	0	4.81	21
Art Jones	1	0	0	0	18.00	0

== Awards and honors ==
- TSN Major League All-Star Team
  - Lefty O'Doul

== Farm system ==
Level	Team	League	Manager
AA	Jersey City Skeeters	International League	Hans Lobert/Charley Moore
A	Hartford Senators	Eastern League	Charley Moore/Bill Marlotte
