= Otto Bluege =

American baseball player (1909–1977)

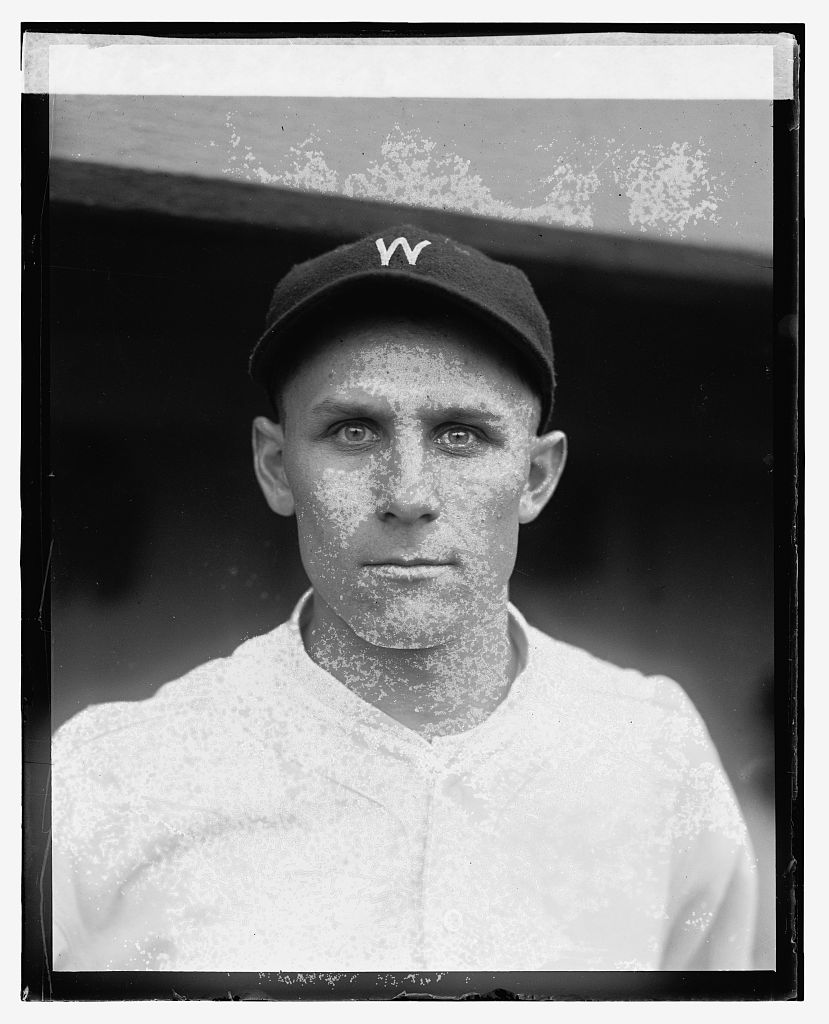
- Shortstop
- Born: July 20, 1909; Chicago, Illinois, U.S.
- Died: June 28, 1977 (aged 67); Chicago, Illinois, U.S.
- Batted: Right Threw: Right

MLB debut
- April 12, 1932, for the Cincinnati Reds

Last MLB appearance
- October 1, 1933, for the Cincinnati Reds

MLB statistics
- Batting average: .213
- Home runs: 0
- Runs batted in: 18
- Stats at Baseball Reference

Teams
- Cincinnati Reds (1932–1933)

Otto Adam Bluege (July 20, 1909 – June 28, 1977) was an American professional baseball player. Nicknamed "Squeaky", he was a shortstop over parts of two seasons (1932–1933) with the Cincinnati Reds. The native and lifelong resident of Chicago, Illinois, was the younger brother of Ossie Bluege, who had a lengthy career as a third baseman, coach, manager and front-office executive with the Washington Senators/Minnesota Twins.

Otto Bluege threw and batted right-handed, and was listed as standing 5 feet 10 inches (1.78 m) and weighing 154 pounds (70 kg). His professional playing career lasted for 13 seasons (1928–1938; 1940–1941).

In 109 games played in the majors, he compiled a .213 batting average in 291 at-bats, with 18 runs batted in. His 62 big-league hits included six doubles and two triples.

After retiring from the field, he scouted for the Senators and Twins. Otto Bluege died in Chicago at the age of 67.
