= 1932 St. Louis Cardinals season =

Major League Baseball season

1932 St. Louis Cardinals
- League: National League
- Ballpark: Sportsman's Park
- City: St. Louis, Missouri
- Record: 72–82 (.468)
- League place: 6th
- Owners: Sam Breadon
- General managers: Branch Rickey
- Managers: Gabby Street
- Radio: KMOX (France Laux); KWK (Thomas Patrick, John Harrington)

The 1932 St. Louis Cardinals season was the team's 51st season in St. Louis, Missouri and its 41st season in the National League. The Cardinals went 72–82 during the season and finished sixth in the National League. This was the first season to feature numbers on the back of the Cardinals' uniforms.

== Offseason ==
- September 30, 1931: Carey Selph was drafted from the Cardinals by the Chicago White Sox in the 1931 rule 5 draft.

== Regular season ==
=== Season standings ===
National League
Team	W	L	Pct.	GB	Home	Road
Chicago Cubs	90	64	.584	—	53‍–‍24	37‍–‍40
Pittsburgh Pirates	86	68	.558	4	45‍–‍31	41‍–‍37
Brooklyn Dodgers	81	73	.526	9	44‍–‍34	37‍–‍39
Philadelphia Phillies	78	76	.506	12	45‍–‍32	33‍–‍44
Boston Braves	77	77	.500	13	44‍–‍33	33‍–‍44
St. Louis Cardinals	72	82	.468	18	42‍–‍35	30‍–‍47
New York Giants	72	82	.468	18	37‍–‍40	35‍–‍42
Cincinnati Reds	60	94	.390	30	33‍–‍44	27‍–‍50

=== Record vs. opponents ===
1932 National League record Sources:
Team	BSN	BRO	CHC	CIN	NYG	PHI	PIT	STL
Boston	—	15–7	8–14	9–13	11–11	11–11	10–12	13–9–1
Brooklyn	7–15	—	10–12	15–7	15–7	8–14	12–10	14–8
Chicago	14–8	12–10	—	12–10	15–7	16–6	9–13	12–10
Cincinnati	13–9	7–15	10–12	—	7–15	9–13	8–14	6–16–1
New York	11–11	7–15	7–15	15–7	—	11–11	7–15	14–8
Philadelphia	11–11	14–8	6–16	13–9	11–11	—	14–8	9–13
Pittsburgh	12–10	10–12	13–9	14–8	15–7	8–14	—	14–8
St. Louis	9–13–1	8–14	10–12	16–6–1	8–14	13–9	8–14	—

=== Roster ===
1932 St. Louis Cardinals
Roster
Pitchers: 18 Tex Carleton; 17 Dizzy Dean; 20 Paul Derringer; -- Benny Frey; 16 Jesse Haines; 22 Bill Hallahan; 23 Syl Johnson; 19 Jim Lindsey; -- Flint Rhem; -- Bill Sherdel; -- Ray Starr; 21 Allyn Stout; -- Bud Teachout; 31 Dick Terwilliger; -- Jim Winford	Catchers: -- Bill DeLancey; 15 Mike González; 14 Gus Mancuso; 12 Jimmie Wilson; Infielders: 1 Sparky Adams; 4 Jim Bottomley; 8 Ripper Collins; -- Ray Cunningham; -- Eddie Delker; 23 Jake Flowers; -- Hod Ford; 3 Frankie Frisch; 11 Charlie Gelbert; -- Harvey Hendrick; 9 Jimmie Reese; 1 Skeeter Webb; 33 Charlie Wilson	Outfielders: 7 Ray Blades; 24 Rube Bressler; 24 Wattie Holm; -- Joel Hunt; 2 Pepper Martin; 28 Joe Medwick; 5 Ernie Orsatti; 29 Ray Pepper; 30 George Puccinelli; 38 George Watkins	Manager: 25 Gabby Street; Coaches: 7 Ray Blades; 26 Buzzy Wares

== Player stats ==
=== Batting ===
==== Starters by position ====
Note: Pos = Position; G = Games played; AB = At bats; H = Hits; Avg. = Batting average; HR = Home runs; RBI = Runs batted in

Pos	Player	G	AB	H	Avg.	HR	RBI
C	Gus Mancuso	103	310	88	.284	5	43
1B	Ripper Collins	149	549	153	.279	21	91
2B	Frankie Frisch	115	486	142	.292	3	60
SS	Charlie Gelbert	122	455	122	.268	1	45
3B	Jake Flowers	67	247	63	.255	2	18
OF	Pepper Martin	85	323	77	.238	4	34
OF	George Watkins	127	458	143	.312	9	63
OF	Ernie Orsatti	101	375	126	.336	2	44

==== Other batters ====
Note: G = Games played; AB = At bats; H = Hits; Avg. = Batting average; HR = Home runs; RBI = Runs batted in

Player	G	AB	H	Avg.	HR	RBI
Jim Bottomley	91	311	92	.296	11	48
Jimmie Reese	90	309	82	.265	2	26
Jimmie Wilson	92	274	68	.248	2	28
Ray Blades	80	201	46	.229	3	29
Sparky Adams	31	127	35	.276	0	13
George Puccinelli	31	108	30	.278	3	11
Joe Medwick	26	106	37	.349	2	12
Charlie Wilson	24	96	19	.198	1	2
Harvey Hendrick	28	72	18	.250	1	5
Ray Pepper	21	57	14	.246	0	7
Eddie Delker	20	42	5	.119	0	2
Bill DeLancey	8	26	5	.192	0	2
Ray Cunningham	11	22	4	.182	0	0
Joel Hunt	12	21	4	.190	0	3
Rube Bressler	10	19	3	.158	0	2
Wattie Holm	11	17	3	.176	0	1
Mike González	17	14	2	.143	0	3
Hod Ford	1	2	0	.000	0	0
Skeeter Webb	1	0	0	----	0	0

=== Pitching ===
==== Starting pitchers ====
Note: G = Games pitched; IP = Innings pitched; W = Wins; L = Losses; ERA = Earned run average; SO = Strikeouts

Player	G	IP	W	L	ERA	SO
Dizzy Dean	46	286.0	18	15	3.30	191
Paul Derringer	39	233.1	11	14	4.05	78
Bill Hallahan	25	176.1	12	7	3.11	108
Syl Johnson	32	164.2	5	14	4.92	70
Flint Rhem	6	50.0	4	2	3.06	18

==== Other pitchers ====
Note: G = Games pitched; IP = Innings pitched; W = Wins; L = Losses; ERA = Earned run average; SO = Strikeouts

Player	G	IP	W	L	ERA	SO
Tex Carleton	44	196.1	10	13	4.08	113
Jesse Haines	20	85.1	3	5	4.75	27
Ray Starr	3	20.0	1	1	2.70	6
Jim Winford	4	8.1	1	1	6.48	4

==== Relief pitchers ====
Note: G = Games pitched; W = Wins; L = Losses; SV = Saves; ERA = Earned run average; SO = Strikeouts

Player	G	W	L	SV	ERA	SO
Allyn Stout	36	4	5	1	4.40	32
Jim Lindsey	33	3	3	4	4.94	31
Bill Sherdel	3	0	0	0	4.76	1
Benny Frey	2	0	2	0	12.00	0
Dick Terwilliger	1	0	0	0	0.00	2
Bud Teachout	1	0	0	0	0.00	0

== Farm system ==
Level	Team	League	Manager
AA	Columbus Red Birds	American Association	Nemo Leibold and Billy Southworth
AA	Rochester Red Wings	International League	Billy Southworth and Specs Toporcer
A	Houston Buffaloes	Texas League	Joe Schultz Sr.
A	Denver Bears	Western League	Earl Smith
B	Elmira Red Birds	New York–Pennsylvania League	Jack Bentley and Clay Hopper
B	Danville Veterans	Illinois–Indiana–Iowa League	Elmer Yoter and Wattie Holm
B	Greensboro Patriots	Piedmont League	Fred Myers
B	Mobile Red Warriors	Southeastern League	Clay Hopper
C	Springfield Cardinals	Western Association	Eddie Dyer
D	Monroe Twins	Cotton States League	Pop Kitchens and Clay Hopper
D	Keokuk Indians	Mississippi Valley League	Bob Rice

LEAGUE CHAMPIONS: Greensboro, Springfield
Illinois–Indiana–Iowa League folded, July 15; Southeastern League folded, May 21; Cotton States League folded, July 13, 1932
