= Harry Taylor (1930s first baseman) =

American baseball player (1907–1969)

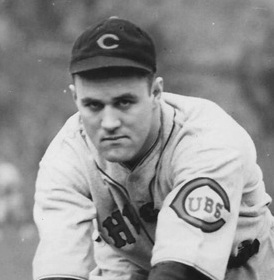
- Taylor with the Chicago Cubs, c. 1932
- First baseman
- Born: December 26, 1907; McKeesport, Pennsylvania, US
- Died: April 27, 1969 (aged 61); Toledo, Ohio, US
- Batted: Left Threw: Left

MLB debut
- April 14, 1932, for the Chicago Cubs

Last MLB appearance
- May 28, 1932, for the Chicago Cubs

MLB statistics
- Batting average: .125
- Home runs: 0
- Runs batted in: 0
- Stats at Baseball Reference

Teams
- Chicago Cubs (1932)

Harry Warren Taylor (December 26, 1907 – April 27, 1969) was an American professional baseball player who played as a first baseman for the 1932 Chicago Cubs of Major League Baseball (MLB). Listed at 6 feet 1.5 inches (1.867 m) and 185 pounds (84 kg), he batted and threw left-handed.

== Biography ==
Taylor's minor league baseball career spanned 1928 to 1943; he appeared in 1099 minor league games while playing for more than 10 different teams. He appeared in 10 games in the major leagues, with the Chicago Cubs in 1932, batting .125 (1-for-8) with one run scored. The Cubs released Taylor to the Reading Keystones of the International League at the end of May 1932. Late in his career, he served as player-manager of the Tiffin Mud Hens in 1941 and Jackson Senators in 1942.

"Handsome Harry" volunteered into the United States Navy during World War II and, although he took all of the combat training, because of his age and background as a professional athlete, he was made a fitness officer. After the war he rejoined the Cubs organization for a short time and then became a businessman until his death from leukemia in 1969. At the time of his death he was survived by his second wife, a son, a daughter and a granddaughter.
