= Ed Pipgras =

American baseball player (1904-1964)

- Pitcher
- Born: June 15, 1904; Schleswig, Iowa, U.S.
- Died: April 13, 1964 (aged 59); Currie, Minnesota, U.S.
- Batted: Right Threw: Right

MLB debut
- August 25, 1932, for the Brooklyn Dodgers

Last MLB appearance
- September 25, 1932, for the Brooklyn Dodgers

MLB statistics
- Win–loss record: 0–1
- Earned run average: 5.40
- Strikeouts: 5
- Stats at Baseball Reference

Teams
- Brooklyn Dodgers (1932)

Edward John Pipgras (June 15, 1904 – April 13, 1964) was an American right-handed pitcher in Major League Baseball who played for the 1932 Brooklyn Dodgers. He appeared in five games, going 0–1 with a 5.40 earned run average. His older brother George Pipgras was also a major league pitcher. Born in Schleswig, Iowa, he died at age 59 in Currie, Minnesota when he crashed into a bridge abutment on Minnesota State Highway 30 5 miles (8.0 km) north of Slayton. He had two children.
