= Bob Adams (1930s pitcher) =

American baseball player (1907-1970)

- Pitcher
- Born: January 20, 1907; Birmingham, Alabama
- Died: March 6, 1970 (aged 63); Jacksonville, Florida
- Batted: Right Threw: Right

MLB debut
- September 27, 1931, for the Philadelphia Phillies

Last MLB appearance
- September 17, 1932, for the Philadelphia Phillies

MLB statistics
- Win–loss record: 0–1
- Earned run average: 5.25
- Strikeouts: 5
- Stats at Baseball Reference

Teams
- Philadelphia Phillies (1931–1932)

Robert Andrew Adams (January 20, 1907 – March 6, 1970) was a Major League Baseball pitcher. Adams played for the Philadelphia Phillies in 1931 and 1932. He batted and threw right-handed.

He was born in Birmingham, Alabama and died in Jacksonville, Florida.
