= Adam Comorosky =

American baseball player (1905–1951)

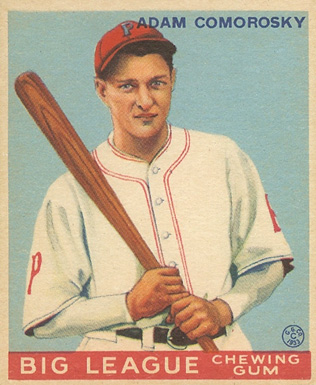
- Outfielder
- Born: December 9, 1905; Swoyersville, Pennsylvania, U.S.
- Died: March 2, 1951 (aged 45); Swoyersville, Pennsylvania, U.S.
- Batted: Right Threw: Right

MLB debut
- September 13, 1926, for the Pittsburgh Pirates

Last MLB appearance
- September 18, 1935, for the Cincinnati Reds

MLB statistics
- Batting average: .285
- Home runs: 28
- Runs batted in: 417
- Stats at Baseball Reference

Teams
- Pittsburgh Pirates (1926–1933); Cincinnati Reds (1934–1935)

Adam Anthony Comorosky (December 9, 1905 – March 2, 1951) was an American Major League Baseball player.

Comorosky started working in the coal mines of Swoyersville, Pennsylvania, at the age of 12, where he worked as a breaker boy. His lesson from the experience was that it "teach[es] you values. If you're ever lucky enough to get a good job outside, you value that job."

His best season in the majors came in 1930, when he drove in 119 runs, hit 47 doubles, and led the National League with 23 triples, a total that has not been surpassed since. His health declined the following year, and he was never the same ballplayer.

He was traded to the Cincinnati Reds November 1933 along with Tony Piet for Red Lucas and Wally Roettger.

His minor league career included stops with the Williamsport Grays in 1926 and the Minneapolis Millers in 1936 After his baseball career was over, he owned a store in the town of Swoyersville, Pennsylvania, until his death at the age of 45.

== Pro career ==
Comorosky made his pro debut for the Williamsport Grays of the New York-Penn League. With the Grays, Comorosky appeared in a handful of games and batted just .196. However, he also earned a trip to play for Waynesboro Villagers of the Blue Ridge League. On September 13, 1926, Comorosky made his major league debut for the Pittsburgh Pirates appearing in one at bat, going hitless versus the New York Giants. Over the course of the next few seasons, Comorosky split his time between the parent club Pittsburgh, and the minors, playing in cities like Wichita and Indianapolis. In 1929, he made the Pirates roster to stay. That season, he appeared in 127 and batted .321 with six home runs. He made the starting outfield, after platooning with former starter Clyde Barnhart the previous season. In the outfield, he played alongside Paul and Lloyd Warner, two brothers and future Hall of Famers. The Pirates ended the 1929 season in second place.

The next season Comorosky lead the team in games played, appearing in 152 games that season. Along with the Warners, each outfielder batted over .300, with Comorosky hitting .316. However, under manager Jewel Ens. the Pirates slipped from second place down to 5th. Statistically, it was a great season for Comorosky. He was 4th in the league with doubles (47), led the league in triples (23) and sacrifice hits (33). he followed up his best season with one of his worst. Appearing in only 99 games the following season, Comorosky also saw his batting average dip to, down 70 points to .243. While he rebounded the next two season, he could not duplicate the success he had in 1930. After the 1933 season was over, the Pirates traded Comorosky to the Cincinnati Reds along with infielder Tony Piet in exchange for pitcher Red Lucas and outfielder Wally Roettger. Comorosky played for the Reds the next two seasons before drawing his release from the big league club at the conclusion of the 1935 season, ending his time in the major leagues. It was back to the minors and playing in cities like Toronto and Wilkes-Barre before retiring at the end of the 1938 season. However, his career wasn't exactly over. In 1940 he signed a contract to play for the Clinton Giants, a farm club of the New York Giants.

In 813 games over 10 seasons, Comorosky posted a .285 batting average (795-for-2787) with 404 runs, 134 doubles, 51 baseball, 28 home runs, 417 RBI, 57 stolen bases and 214 bases on balls. Defensively, he recorded a .972 fielding percentage playing at all three outfield positions.

== See also ==
- List of Major League Baseball annual triples leaders
