= Bill Brubaker =

American baseball player (1910–1978)

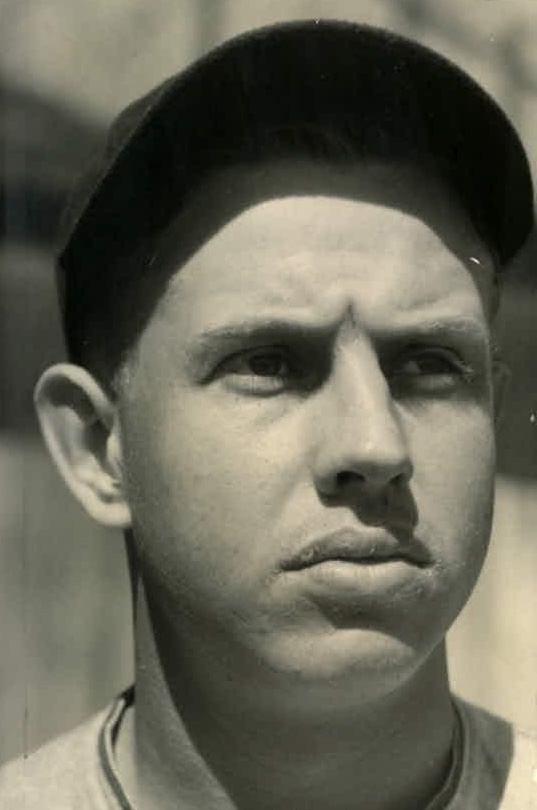
- Brubaker in 1932
- Third baseman
- Born: November 7, 1910; Cleveland, Ohio, U.S.
- Died: April 2, 1978 (aged 67); Laguna Hills, California, U.S.
- Batted: Right Threw: Right

MLB debut
- September 8, 1932, for the Pittsburgh Pirates

Last MLB appearance
- July 11, 1943, for the Boston Braves

MLB statistics
- Batting average: .264
- Home runs: 22
- Runs batted in: 225
- Stats at Baseball Reference

Teams
- Pittsburgh Pirates (1932–1940); Boston Braves (1943)

Wilbur Lee "Bill" Brubaker (November 7, 1910 – April 2, 1978) was a professional American baseball player from 1932 to 1943, although he did not play the 1941 or 1942 seasons. Of his ten years of play, Brubaker played nine with the Pittsburgh Pirates, playing third base. His best year was in 1936, when he hit for a .289 batting average and knocked in an impressive 102 RBIs. Brubaker's career fell apart after that, never even getting 50 RBIs again. His last year, in 1943, was with the Boston Braves.

His grandson, Dennis Rasmussen, also played in the major leagues.

The picture of another baseball player, Dave Barbee, appears on some cards and photographs attributed to Bill Brubaker. This appears to follow from a misnamed 1932 photo of Barbee taken by the baseball photographer George Burke. Tom Shieber, curator at the Baseball Hall of Fame, detected this error in 2018 based on details of Barbee's uniform.
