= Dave Barbee =

American baseball player (1905–1968)

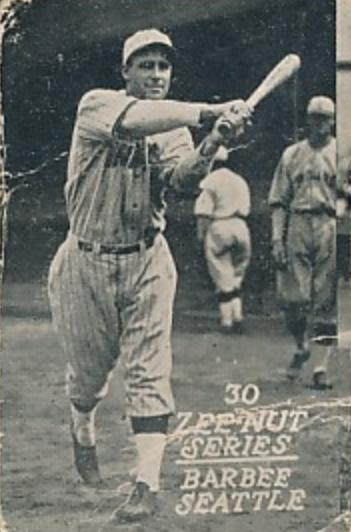
- Barbee in 1930
- Outfielder
- Born: May 7, 1905; Greensboro, North Carolina, U.S.
- Died: July 1, 1968 (aged 63); Albemarle, North Carolina, U.S.
- Batted: Right Threw: Right

MLB debut
- July 29, 1926, for the Philadelphia Athletics

Last MLB appearance
- September 25, 1932, for the Pittsburgh Pirates

MLB statistics
- Batting average: .246
- Home runs: 6
- Runs batted in: 60
- Stats at Baseball Reference

Teams
- Philadelphia Athletics (1926); Pittsburgh Pirates (1932)

David Monroe Barbee (May 7, 1905 – July 1, 1968) was an American outfielder in Major League Baseball. He played for the Philadelphia Athletics and Pittsburgh Pirates, finishing his MLB career with a .246 batting average. He also won three home run titles in the minor leagues. Barbee was 5 feet, 11 inches tall and weighed 178 pounds.

== Career ==
Barbee was born in Greensboro, North Carolina, in 1905. He attended Pomona High School in Greensboro. In 1923, he led the Pomona baseball team to the NCHSAA state title.

He started his professional baseball career in 1925 with the Piedmont League's Greensboro Patriots. In 16 games that season, he batted .333. Barbee hit well in 1926, and he was batting .372 with 29 home runs before being acquired by the major league Philadelphia Athletics in July. The 29 homers were good enough to lead the Piedmont League, even though he did not play there the entire season. With the Athletics, he appeared in 19 games and batted .190.

Barbee then spent 1927 in the International League before going to the Pacific Coast League in 1928. He hit 16 home runs during his first PCL campaign, 22 during his second, and then 41 in 1930 to lead the league. In 1931, while playing for the Hollywood Stars, he batted .332, and his 47 home runs were 10 more than any other PCL player.

In 1932, Barbee received another shot in the majors, this time with the Pittsburgh Pirates. He was the Pirates' starting left fielder in the middle of the season but lost the job in August and was a pinch hitter for the last two months. In 97 games played, he batted .257 with five home runs.

Barbee went back down to the minor leagues in 1933. His batting average stayed under .300, and he retired in 1935. He returned to professional baseball for one more season, in 1942, and hit 17 home runs in 58 games.

Barbee died in Albemarle, North Carolina, in 1968 and was buried in Guilford Memorial Park.
