= Dick Matthews =

American baseball player

- Pitcher
- Born: Unknown; Unknown
- Died: Unknown; Unknown
- Batted: Unknown Threw: Unknown

Negro league baseball debut
- 1932, for the Monroe Monarchs

Last appearance
- 1932, for the Monroe Monarchs

Negro Southern League statistics
- Win–loss record: 11–2
- Earned run average: 2.17
- Strikeouts: 59
- Stats at Baseball Reference

Teams
- Monroe Monarchs (1932)

Dick Matthews is an American former professional baseball pitcher in the Negro leagues who played in the 1930s.

Matthews played for the Monroe Monarchs in 1932. In 16 recorded appearances on the mound, he posted an 11–2 record with a 2.17 ERA over 116.1 innings.
