= Dick Terwilliger =

American baseball player (1906–1969)

- Pitcher
- Born: June 27, 1906; Sand Lake, Michigan, U.S.
- Died: January 21, 1969 (aged 62); Greenville, Michigan, U.S.
- Batted: Right Threw: Right

MLB debut
- August 18, 1932, for the St. Louis Cardinals

Last MLB appearance
- August 18, 1932, for the St. Louis Cardinals

MLB statistics
- Games played: 1
- Innings pitched: 3
- Earned run average: 0.00
- Stats at Baseball Reference

Teams
- St. Louis Cardinals (1932)

Richard Martin Terwilliger (June 27, 1906 – January 21, 1969) was an American pitcher in Major League Baseball. He played for the St. Louis Cardinals in 1932, making just one big league appearance on August 18, 1932. In his lone MLB appearance, Terwilliger pitched three scoreless innings in a game that the famous Dizzy Dean had started, a 10–4 loss to the Phillies in which Terwilliger pitched the final three frames for St. Louis.
