= 1932 New York Giants (MLB) season =

1932 New York Giants
- League: National League
- Ballpark: Polo Grounds
- City: New York City
- Record: 72–82 (.468)
- League place: 7th
- Owners: Charles Stoneham
- Managers: John McGraw, Bill Terry

The 1932 New York Giants season was the 50th for the franchise. The team finished in a tie for sixth place in the National League with a 72–82 record, 18 games behind the Chicago Cubs.

Although the Giants did not contend for the National League pennant, 1932 was still a significant season in the future of the franchise. Firstly, midway through the season, longtime manager John McGraw stepped down, and he named hard-hitting star first baseman Bill Terry as his successor. Secondly, converted outfielder and future Hall of Famer Freddie Lindstrom was in his final season with the Giants before a trade to the Pirates prior to the 1933 season. Finally, this was the first season in which the Giants featured numbers on the uniforms.

== Regular season ==
=== Season standings ===
National League
Team	W	L	Pct.	GB	Home	Road
Chicago Cubs	90	64	.584	—	53‍–‍24	37‍–‍40
Pittsburgh Pirates	86	68	.558	4	45‍–‍31	41‍–‍37
Brooklyn Dodgers	81	73	.526	9	44‍–‍34	37‍–‍39
Philadelphia Phillies	78	76	.506	12	45‍–‍32	33‍–‍44
Boston Braves	77	77	.500	13	44‍–‍33	33‍–‍44
St. Louis Cardinals	72	82	.468	18	42‍–‍35	30‍–‍47
New York Giants	72	82	.468	18	37‍–‍40	35‍–‍42
Cincinnati Reds	60	94	.390	30	33‍–‍44	27‍–‍50

=== Record vs. opponents ===
1932 National League record Sources:
Team	BSN	BRO	CHC	CIN	NYG	PHI	PIT	STL
Boston	—	15–7	8–14	9–13	11–11	11–11	10–12	13–9–1
Brooklyn	7–15	—	10–12	15–7	15–7	8–14	12–10	14–8
Chicago	14–8	12–10	—	12–10	15–7	16–6	9–13	12–10
Cincinnati	13–9	7–15	10–12	—	7–15	9–13	8–14	6–16–1
New York	11–11	7–15	7–15	15–7	—	11–11	7–15	14–8
Philadelphia	11–11	14–8	6–16	13–9	11–11	—	14–8	9–13
Pittsburgh	12–10	10–12	13–9	14–8	15–7	8–14	—	14–8
St. Louis	9–13–1	8–14	10–12	16–6–1	8–14	13–9	8–14	—

=== Roster ===
1932 New York Giants
Roster
Pitchers: 15 Hi Bell; 11 Freddie Fitzsimmons; 17 Sam Gibson; 19 Waite Hoyt; 10 Carl Hubbell; 16 Dolf Luque; 25 Clarence Mitchell; 14 Jim Mooney; 35 Roy Parmelee; 18 Hal Schumacher; 12 Bill Walker	Catchers: 24 Francis Healy; 7 Shanty Hogan; 9 Bob O'Farrell; Infielders: 1 Hughie Critz; 23 Gil English; 6 Travis Jackson; 20 Sam Leslie; 24 Doc Marshall; 28 Art McLarney; -- Eddie Moore; 4 Bill Terry; 8 Johnny Vergez	Outfielders: 22 Ethan Allen; 21 Chick Fullis; 31 Len Koenecke; 3 Freddie Lindstrom; 2 Jo-Jo Moore; 5 Mel Ott; Other batters: 30 Tip Tobin; 31 Pat Veltman	Manager: -- John McGraw; 4 Bill Terry; Coaches: ?? Dave Bancroft; 27 Tommy Clarke; 25 Clarence Mitchell; ?? Ivy Olson

== Player stats ==
=== Batting ===
==== Starters by position ====
Note: Pos = Position; G = Games played; AB = At bats; H = Hits; Avg. = Batting average; HR = Home runs; RBI = Runs batted in

Pos	Player	G	AB	H	Avg.	HR	RBI
C	Shanty Hogan	140	502	144	.287	8	77
1B	Bill Terry	154	643	225	.350	28	117
2B	Hughie Critz	151	659	182	.276	2	50
3B	Johnny Vergez	118	376	98	.261	6	43
SS	Doc Marshall	68	226	56	.248	0	28
OF	Mel Ott	154	566	180	.318	38	123
OF	Freddie Lindstrom	144	595	161	.271	15	92
OF	Jo-Jo Moore	86	361	110	.305	2	27

==== Other batters ====
Note: G = Games played; AB = At bats; H = Hits; Avg. = Batting average; HR = Home runs; RBI = Runs batted in

Player	G	AB	H	Avg.	HR	RBI
Chick Fullis	96	235	70	.298	1	21
Gil English	59	204	46	.225	2	19
Travis Jackson	52	195	50	.256	4	38
Len Koenecke	42	137	35	.255	4	14
Ethan Allen	54	103	18	.175	1	7
Eddie Moore	37	87	23	.264	1	6
Sam Leslie	77	75	22	.293	1	15
Bob O'Farrell	50	67	16	.239	0	8
Francis Healy	14	32	8	.250	0	4
Art McLarney	9	23	3	.130	0	3
Pat Veltman	2	1	0	.000	0	0
Tip Tobin	1	1	0	.000	0	0

=== Pitching ===
==== Starting pitchers ====
Note: G = Games pitched; IP = Innings pitched; W = Wins; L = Losses; ERA = Earned run average; SO = Strikeouts

Player	G	IP	W	L	ERA	SO
Carl Hubbell	40	284.0	18	11	2.50	137
Freddie Fitzsimmons	35	237.2	11	11	4.43	65
Bill Walker	31	163.0	8	12	4.14	74
Waite Hoyt	18	97.1	5	7	3.42	29

==== Other pitchers ====
Note: G = Games pitched; IP = Innings pitched; W = Wins; L = Losses; ERA = Earned run average; SO = Strikeouts

Player	G	IP	W	L	ERA	SO
Jim Mooney	29	124.2	6	10	5.05	37
Hi Bell	35	120.0	8	4	3.68	25
Hal Schumacher	27	101.1	5	6	3.55	38
Clarence Mitchell	8	30.1	1	3	4.15	7
Roy Parmelee	8	25.1	0	3	3.91	23

==== Relief pitchers ====
Note: G = Games pitched; W = Wins; L = Losses; SV = Saves; ERA = Earned run average; SO = Strikeouts

Player	G	W	L	SV	ERA	SO
Sam Gibson	41	4	8	3	4.85	39
Dolph Luque	38	6	7	5	4.01	32

== Farm system ==
Level	Team	League	Manager
A	Bridgeport Bears	Eastern League	Bud Stapleton and Harry Layne
B	Winston-Salem Twins/High Point Pointers	Piedmont League	Harry Wilke

Eastern League folded, July 17, 1932; Winston-Salem franchise transferred to High Point and renamed, August 20, 1932
