= Hal Smith (pitcher) =

American baseball player (1902–1992)

- Pitcher
- Born: June 30, 1902; Creston, Iowa, U.S.
- Died: September 27, 1992 (aged 90); Fort Lauderdale, Florida, U.S.
- Batted: Right Threw: Right

MLB debut
- September 14, 1932, for the Pittsburgh Pirates

Last MLB appearance
- April 18, 1935, for the Pittsburgh Pirates

MLB statistics
- Win–loss record: 12–11
- Earned run average: 3.77
- Strikeouts: 59
- Stats at Baseball Reference

Teams
- Pittsburgh Pirates (1932–1935)

Harold Laverne Smith (June 30, 1902 – September 27, 1992) was an American Major League Baseball pitcher who played with the Pittsburgh Pirates from 1932 to 1935. Appearing in 51 games, he compiled a 12–11 record, posting a 3.77 earned run average, striking out 59, while walking 52.
