= Bruce Caldwell (American football/baseball) =

American sportsman (1906–1959)

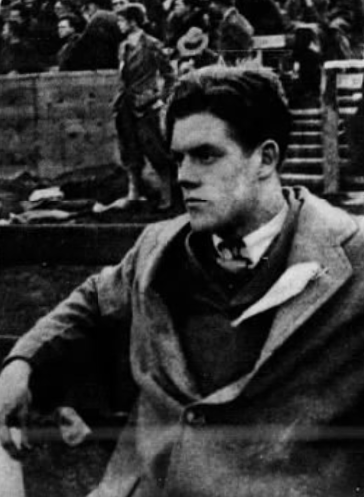
- Caldwell in 1927
- Outfielder / First baseman
- Born: February 8, 1906; Ashton, Rhode Island, U.S.
- Died: February 15, 1959 (aged 53); West Haven, Connecticut, U.S.
- Batted: Right Threw: Right

MLB debut
- June 30, 1928, for the Cleveland Indians

Last MLB appearance
- June 6, 1932, for the Brooklyn Dodgers

MLB statistics
- Batting average: .184
- Hits: 7
- Runs batted in: 5
- Stats at Baseball Reference

Teams
- Cleveland Indians (1928); Brooklyn Dodgers (1932)
Football career
Profile
Position	Running back
Career information
College	Brown (1924); Yale (1925–1927)
Career history
1928	New York Giants
Awards and highlights
National champion (1927)
Stats at Pro Football Reference

Bruce Caldwell (February 8, 1906 – February 15, 1959) was an American sportsman. He played as an outfielder and first baseman for the Cleveland Indians and Brooklyn Dodgers, as well as a football running back in the National Football League (NFL) for the New York Giants. He played college football for the Brown Bears and college football and baseball for the Yale Bulldogs.
