= Reggie Grabowski =

American baseball player (1907–1955)

- Pitcher
- Born: July 16, 1907; Syracuse, New York
- Died: April 2, 1955 (aged 47); Syracuse, New York
- Batted: Right Threw: Right

MLB debut
- April 15, 1932, for the Philadelphia Phillies

Last MLB appearance
- September 24, 1934, for the Philadelphia Phillies

MLB statistics
- Win–loss record: 4–8
- Earned run average: 5.73
- Strikeouts: 37
- Stats at Baseball Reference

Teams
- Philadelphia Phillies (1932–1934)

Reginald John Grabowski (July 16, 1907 – April 2, 1955) was a pitcher in Major League Baseball. He played for the Philadelphia Phillies. Grabowski played for the Syracuse Chiefs, Minneapolis Millers and Montreal Dodgers after pitching for the Phillies. After baseball, worked for the city of Syracuse, New York as a staff member in the city traffic and lighting department. He died at his home on April 2, 1955 of a heart attack while preparing for a bowling tournament in Elmira, New York.
