= 1932 Cincinnati Reds season =

1932 Cincinnati Reds
- League: National League
- Ballpark: Redland Field
- City: Cincinnati
- Owners: Sidney Weil
- Managers: Dan Howley
- Radio: WFBE (Harry Hartman, Sidney Ten-Eyck)

The 1932 Cincinnati Reds season was a season in American baseball. The team finished eighth and last in the National League with a record of 60–94, 30 games behind the Chicago Cubs.

== Offseason ==
In December, the Reds purchased outfielder Wally Roettger from the St. Louis Cardinals. Roettger, who began the 1931 season with the Reds before being traded to St. Louis, finished the season with a .321 batting average with a home run and 37 RBI in 89 games split between the two clubs. In three World Series games Roettger hit .286, helping the Cardinals win the 1931 World Series over the Philadelphia Athletics.

On December 2, Cincinnati acquired third baseman Andy High from the St. Louis Cardinals in exchange for outfielder Nick Cullop and cash. High had a .267 average with 19 RBI in 63 games with St. Louis in 1931. His best seasons came in 1924 when he played for the Brooklyn Robins, as High had a .328 batting average with six home runs and 61 RBI in 144 games, finishing in 12th place in National League MVP voting. In the 1931 World Series, High hit .267 in four games, helping the Cardinals to the championship.

The Reds sold infielder Hod Ford to the St. Louis Cardinals in late January. Ford had been with the Reds since 1926, and in 685 games with the club, he hit .256 with five home runs and 215 RBI.

On February 4, Cincinnati purchased infielder George Grantham from the Pittsburgh Pirates. Grantham hit .305 with 10 home runs and 46 RBI in 127 games with the Pirates in 1931. In 1930, Grantham hit .324 with 18 home runs and 99 RBI. Grantham won the 1925 World Series with the Pirates, as they defeated the Washington Senators.

On March 14, the Reds and Brooklyn Dodgers made a big trade. Cincinnati traded away second baseman Tony Cuccinello, third baseman Joe Stripp and catcher Clyde Sukeforth to Brooklyn in exchange for outfielder Babe Herman, third baseman Wally Gilbert and catcher Ernie Lombardi. Herman was coming off of a season in which he hit .313 with 18 home runs, 97 RBI and 17 stolen bases in 151 games. In 1930, Herman hit .393 with 35 home runs and 130 RBI, and stole 18 bases with the Dodgers. In 888 games with Brooklyn, Herman had a .339 batting average with 112 home runs and 594 RBI. Gilbert had a .266 average with 46 RBI in 145 games during the 1931 season, while Lombardi hit .297 with four home runs and 23 RBI in 73 games.

The Reds and St. Louis Cardinals made another deal in April, as Cincinnati traded pitcher Benny Frey, first baseman Harvey Hendrick and cash to St. Louis in exchange for outfielder Chick Hafey. Hafey led the National League with a .349 batting average in 1931, while hitting 16 home runs and earning 95 RBI in 122 games. Hafey won the World Series with the Cardinals in 1926 and 1931.

== Regular season ==
The Reds had a solid start to the regular season, winning five of their first eight games, to sit in a tie with the Boston Braves for first place in the National League. The Reds then won only three of their next eight games to finish April in third place with a record of 8-8.

The Reds continued to play good baseball into May, and following a 4–3 win over the Philadelphia Phillies on May 9, the Reds had a record of 14–11, remaining in third place, 3.5 games behind the pennant leading Chicago Cubs. On this date, the Reds purchased pitcher Benny Frey from the St. Louis Cardinals. Frey, who pitched for the Reds from 1929 to 1931 before being purchased by the Cardinals in the off-season, had a record of 0–2 with a 12.00 ERA in two games with St. Louis in 1932.

On May 22, the Reds completed a three-game series sweep against the first place Chicago Cubs, to improve their record to 21–17, cutting the Cubs lead to only three games over the third place Reds. Following the series, the Reds slumped to a record of 4–17 in their next 21 games, as the team sank into last place.

On June 5, Cincinnati sold first baseman Mickey Heath to the St. Louis Cardinals, then purchased first baseman Harvey Hendrick from the Cardinals. Hendrick, who was the Reds starting first baseman in 1931, had a .250 average with a home run and five RBI in 28 games with St. Louis. On June 6, the Reds released outfielder Harry Heilmann. Heilmann, who missed the entire 1931 season due to arthritis of the wrist, struggled in 1932, hitting .258 with no home runs and six RBI in 15 games. This marked the end of Heilmann's career, as in 2147 games, he hit .342 with 183 home runs and 1543 RBI, while stealing 111 bases. Heilmann spent the majority of his career with the Detroit Tigers.

Cincinnati would remain in last place for the rest of the season. The club finished the season with a record of 60–94, 30 games behind the pennant winning Chicago Cubs, and 12 games behind the St. Louis Cardinals and New York Giants, who finished in a tie for sixth place. The 60 victories was the Reds highest total since winning 66 games in 1929, and was a two-game improvement over the 1931 club. Despite the last place finish, the Reds attendance rose by nearly 100,000 fans over 1931, as Cincinnati drew 356,950, good for fifth in the National League.

Outfielder Babe Herman had an excellent season with Cincinnati, as he led the club with a .326 batting average with 16 home runs and 87 RBI in 148 games. Catcher Ernie Lombardi hit .303 with 11 home runs and 68 RBI in 118 games in his first season with the team. First baseman Harvey Hendrick hit .302 with four home runs and 40 RBI in 94 games after being acquired from the St. Louis Cardinals during the season.

Red Lucas anchored the pitching staff, as in 31 starts, he had a record of 13–17 with a 2.94 ERA in 269.1 innings pitched. Lucas pitched an NL leading 28 complete games. Si Johnson finished the season with a 13–15 record with a 3.27 ERA in 42 games. Johnson struck out a team high 94 batters.

=== Season standings ===
National League
Team	W	L	Pct.	GB	Home	Road
Chicago Cubs	90	64	.584	—	53‍–‍24	37‍–‍40
Pittsburgh Pirates	86	68	.558	4	45‍–‍31	41‍–‍37
Brooklyn Dodgers	81	73	.526	9	44‍–‍34	37‍–‍39
Philadelphia Phillies	78	76	.506	12	45‍–‍32	33‍–‍44
Boston Braves	77	77	.500	13	44‍–‍33	33‍–‍44
St. Louis Cardinals	72	82	.468	18	42‍–‍35	30‍–‍47
New York Giants	72	82	.468	18	37‍–‍40	35‍–‍42
Cincinnati Reds	60	94	.390	30	33‍–‍44	27‍–‍50

=== Record vs. opponents ===
1932 National League record Sources:
Team	BSN	BRO	CHC	CIN	NYG	PHI	PIT	STL
Boston	—	15–7	8–14	9–13	11–11	11–11	10–12	13–9–1
Brooklyn	7–15	—	10–12	15–7	15–7	8–14	12–10	14–8
Chicago	14–8	12–10	—	12–10	15–7	16–6	9–13	12–10
Cincinnati	13–9	7–15	10–12	—	7–15	9–13	8–14	6–16–1
New York	11–11	7–15	7–15	15–7	—	11–11	7–15	14–8
Philadelphia	11–11	14–8	6–16	13–9	11–11	—	14–8	9–13
Pittsburgh	12–10	10–12	13–9	14–8	15–7	8–14	—	14–8
St. Louis	9–13–1	8–14	10–12	16–6–1	8–14	13–9	8–14	—

=== Roster ===
1932 Cincinnati Reds
Roster
Pitchers: 19 Larry Benton; 17 Ownie Carroll; 16 Benny Frey; 21 Whitey Hilcher; 14 Si Johnson; 15 Ray Kolp; 12 Red Lucas; 20 Jack Ogden; 18 Eppa Rixey; 30 Biff Wysong	Catchers: 22 Casper Asbjornson; 7 Ernie Lombardi; 11 Clyde Manion; Infielders: 10 Leo Durocher; 2 Wally Gilbert; 1 George Grantham; 7 Mickey Heath; 22 Harry Heilmann; 4 Harvey Hendrick; 23 Andy High; 24 Jo-Jo Morrissey; 18 Jimmy Shevlin	Outfielders: 3 Estel Crabtree; 9 Taylor Douthit; 6 Chick Hafey; 5 Babe Herman; 8 Wally Roettger; Other batters: 17 Otto Bluege; 21 Cliff Heathcote	Manager: 31 Dan Howley; Coaches: -- Mickey Doolan; 22 Harry Heilmann

== Player stats ==
=== Batting ===
==== Starters by position ====
Note: Pos = Position; G = Games played; AB = At bats; H = Hits; Avg. = Batting average; HR = Home runs; RBI = Runs batted in

Pos	Player	G	AB	H	Avg.	HR	RBI
C	Ernie Lombardi	118	413	125	.303	11	68
1B	Harvey Hendrick	94	398	120	.302	4	40
2B	George Grantham	126	493	144	.292	6	39
SS	Leo Durocher	143	457	99	.217	1	33
3B	Wally Gilbert	114	420	90	.214	1	40
OF	Babe Herman	148	577	188	.326	16	87
OF	Wally Roettger	106	347	96	.277	3	43
OF	Estel Crabtree	108	402	110	.274	2	35

==== Other batters ====
Note: G = Games played; AB = At bats; H = Hits; Avg. = Batting average; HR = Home runs; RBI = Runs batted in

Player	G	AB	H	Avg.	HR	RBI
Taylor Douthit	96	333	81	.243	0	25
Jo-Jo Morrissey	89	269	65	.242	0	13
Chick Hafey	83	253	87	.344	2	36
Andy High	84	191	36	.188	0	12
Clyde Manion	49	135	28	.207	0	12
Mickey Heath	39	134	27	.201	0	15
Casper Asbjornson	29	58	10	.172	1	4
Harry Heilmann	15	31	8	.258	0	6
Jimmy Shevlin	7	24	5	.208	0	4
Cliff Heathcote	8	3	0	.000	0	0
Otto Bluege	1	0	0	----	0	0

=== Pitching ===
==== Starting pitchers ====
Note: G = Games pitched; IP = Innings pitched; W = Wins; L = Losses; ERA = Earned run average; SO = Strikeouts

Player	G	IP	W	L	ERA	SO
Red Lucas	31	269.1	13	17	2.94	63
Ownie Carroll	32	210.0	10	19	4.50	55

==== Other pitchers ====
Note: G = Games pitched; IP = Innings pitched; W = Wins; L = Losses; ERA = Earned run average; SO = Strikeouts

Player	G	IP	W	L	ERA	SO
Si Johnson	42	245.0	13	15	3.27	94
Larry Benton	35	179.2	6	13	4.31	35
Ray Kolp	32	159.2	6	10	3.89	42
Benny Frey	28	131.1	4	10	4.32	27
Eppa Rixey	25	111.2	5	5	2.66	14

==== Relief pitchers ====
Note: G = Games pitched; W = Wins; L = Losses; SV = Saves; ERA = Earned run average; SO = Strikeouts

Player	G	W	L	SV	ERA	SO
Jack Ogden	24	2	2	0	5.21	20
Whitey Hilcher	11	0	3	0	7.71	4
Biff Wysong	7	1	0	0	3.65	5

== Farm system ==
Level	Team	League	Manager
C	Bartlesville Broncos	Western Association	Art Schmidt and Art Ewoldt
D	Cedar Rapids Bunnies	Mississippi Valley League	Paul Speraw
