= Tip Tobin =

American baseball player

- Pinch hitter
- Born: September 15, 1906; Jamaica Plain, Massachusetts, U.S.
- Died: August 6, 1983 (aged 76); Rhinebeck, New York, U.S.
- Batted: Right Threw: Right

MLB debut
- September 22, 1932, for the New York Giants

Last MLB appearance
- September 22, 1932, for the New York Giants

MLB statistics
- Games played: 1
- At bats: 1
- Hits: 0
- Stats at Baseball Reference

Teams
- New York Giants (1932)

John Martin "Tip" Tobin (September 15, 1906 – August 6, 1983) was an American pinch hitter for the New York Giants baseball team in 1932.
