= 1932 Boston Braves season =

1932 Boston Braves
- League: National League
- Ballpark: Braves Field
- City: Boston, Massachusetts
- Record: 77–77 (.500)
- League place: 5th
- Owners: Emil Fuchs
- Managers: Bill McKechnie
- Radio: WNAC (Fred Hoey)

The 1932 Boston Braves season was the 62nd season of the franchise.

== Regular season ==
=== Season standings ===
National League
| Team | W | L | Pct. | GB | Home | Road |
|---|---|---|---|---|---|---|
| Chicago Cubs | 90 | 64 | .584 | — | 53‍–‍24 | 37‍–‍40 |
| Pittsburgh Pirates | 86 | 68 | .558 | 4 | 45‍–‍31 | 41‍–‍37 |
| Brooklyn Dodgers | 81 | 73 | .526 | 9 | 44‍–‍34 | 37‍–‍39 |
| Philadelphia Phillies | 78 | 76 | .506 | 12 | 45‍–‍32 | 33‍–‍44 |
| Boston Braves | 77 | 77 | .500 | 13 | 44‍–‍33 | 33‍–‍44 |
| St. Louis Cardinals | 72 | 82 | .468 | 18 | 42‍–‍35 | 30‍–‍47 |
| New York Giants | 72 | 82 | .468 | 18 | 37‍–‍40 | 35‍–‍42 |
| Cincinnati Reds | 60 | 94 | .390 | 30 | 33‍–‍44 | 27‍–‍50 |

=== Record vs. opponents ===
1932 National League record Sources:
| Team | BSN | BRO | CHC | CIN | NYG | PHI | PIT | STL |
|---|---|---|---|---|---|---|---|---|
| Boston | — | 15–7 | 8–14 | 9–13 | 11–11 | 11–11 | 10–12 | 13–9–1 |
| Brooklyn | 7–15 | — | 10–12 | 15–7 | 15–7 | 8–14 | 12–10 | 14–8 |
| Chicago | 14–8 | 12–10 | — | 12–10 | 15–7 | 16–6 | 9–13 | 12–10 |
| Cincinnati | 13–9 | 7–15 | 10–12 | — | 7–15 | 9–13 | 8–14 | 6–16–1 |
| New York | 11–11 | 7–15 | 7–15 | 15–7 | — | 11–11 | 7–15 | 14–8 |
| Philadelphia | 11–11 | 14–8 | 6–16 | 13–9 | 11–11 | — | 14–8 | 9–13 |
| Pittsburgh | 12–10 | 10–12 | 13–9 | 14–8 | 15–7 | 8–14 | — | 14–8 |
| St. Louis | 9–13–1 | 8–14 | 10–12 | 16–6–1 | 8–14 | 13–9 | 8–14 | — |

=== Roster ===
1932 Boston Braves
Roster
| Pitchers: 19 Huck Betts; 11 Ed Brandt; 18 Bob Brown; 15 Ben Cantwell; 17 Bruce Cunningham; 16 Fred Frankhouse; 27 Leo Mangum; 21 Hub Pruett; 12 Socks Seibold; -- Bill Sherdel; 14 Tom Zachary | Catchers: 9 Pinky Hargrave; 23 Johnny Schulte; 8 Al Spohrer; Infielders: 6 Bill Akers; 24 Hod Ford; 5 Buck Jordan; 7 Fritz Knothe; 1 Rabbit Maranville; 5 Art Shires; 10 Billy Urbanski; 9 Bucky Walters | Outfielders: 3 Wally Berger; 30 Earl Clark; 28 Dutch Holland; 22 Freddy Leach; 20 Randy Moore; 4 Wes Schulmerich; 2 Red Worthington; Other batters: -- Ox Eckhardt | Manager: 34 Bill McKechnie; Coaches: 32 Hank Gowdy; 33 Duffy Lewis |

== Player stats ==
=== Batting ===
==== Starters by position ====
Note: Pos = Position; G = Games played; AB = At bats; H = Hits; Avg. = Batting average; HR = Home runs; RBI = Runs batted in

| Pos | Player | G | AB | H | Avg. | HR | RBI |
|---|---|---|---|---|---|---|---|
| C | Al Spohrer | 104 | 335 | 90 | .269 | 0 | 33 |
| 1B | Art Shires | 82 | 298 | 71 | .238 | 5 | 30 |
| 2B | Rabbit Maranville | 149 | 571 | 134 | .235 | 0 | 37 |
| SS | Billy Urbanski | 136 | 563 | 153 | .272 | 8 | 46 |
| 3B | Fritz Knothe | 89 | 344 | 82 | .238 | 1 | 36 |
| OF | Wes Schulmerich | 119 | 404 | 105 | .260 | 11 | 57 |
| OF | Wally Berger | 145 | 602 | 185 | .307 | 17 | 73 |
| OF | Red Worthington | 105 | 435 | 132 | .303 | 8 | 61 |

==== Other batters ====
Note: G = Games played; AB = At bats; H = Hits; Avg. = Batting average; HR = Home runs; RBI = Runs batted in

| Player | G | AB | H | Avg. | HR | RBI |
|---|---|---|---|---|---|---|
| Randy Moore | 107 | 351 | 103 | .293 | 3 | 43 |
| Freddy Leach | 84 | 223 | 55 | .247 | 1 | 29 |
| Pinky Hargrave | 82 | 217 | 57 | .263 | 4 | 33 |
| Buck Jordan | 49 | 212 | 68 | .321 | 2 | 29 |
| Dutch Holland | 39 | 156 | 46 | .295 | 1 | 18 |
| Hod Ford | 40 | 95 | 26 | .274 | 0 | 6 |
| Bill Akers | 36 | 93 | 24 | .258 | 1 | 17 |
| Bucky Walters | 22 | 75 | 14 | .187 | 0 | 4 |
| Earl Clark | 50 | 44 | 11 | .250 | 0 | 4 |
| Johnny Schulte | 10 | 9 | 2 | .222 | 1 | 2 |
| Ox Eckhardt | 8 | 8 | 2 | .250 | 0 | 1 |

=== Pitching ===
==== Starting pitchers ====
Note: G = Games pitched; IP = Innings pitched; W = Wins; L = Losses; ERA = Earned run average; SO = Strikeouts

| Player | G | IP | W | L | ERA | SO |
|---|---|---|---|---|---|---|
| Ed Brandt | 35 | 254.0 | 16 | 16 | 3.97 | 79 |
| Huck Betts | 31 | 221.2 | 13 | 11 | 2.80 | 32 |
| Bob Brown | 35 | 213.0 | 14 | 7 | 3.30 | 110 |
| Tom Zachary | 32 | 212.0 | 12 | 11 | 3.10 | 67 |

==== Other pitchers ====
Note: G = Games pitched; IP = Innings pitched; W = Wins; L = Losses; ERA = Earned run average; SO = Strikeouts

| Player | G | IP | W | L | ERA | SO |
|---|---|---|---|---|---|---|
| Ben Cantwell | 37 | 146.0 | 13 | 11 | 2.96 | 33 |
| Socks Seibold | 28 | 136.2 | 3 | 10 | 4.68 | 33 |
| Fred Frankhouse | 37 | 108.2 | 4 | 6 | 3.56 | 35 |
| Hub Pruett | 18 | 63.0 | 1 | 5 | 5.14 | 27 |
| Bruce Cunningham | 18 | 47.0 | 1 | 0 | 3.45 | 21 |

==== Relief pitchers ====
Note: G = Games pitched; W = Wins; L = Losses; SV = Saves; ERA = Earned run average; SO = Strikeouts

| Player | G | W | L | SV | ERA | SO |
|---|---|---|---|---|---|---|
| Leo Mangum | 7 | 0 | 0 | 0 | 5.23 | 3 |
| Bill Sherdel | 1 | 0 | 0 | 0 | 0.00 | 0 |

== Farm system ==
| Level | Team | League | Manager |
|---|---|---|---|
| B | Harrisburg Senators | New York–Pennsylvania League | Eddie Onslow |
