= Glenn Spencer (baseball) =

American baseball player (1905–1958)

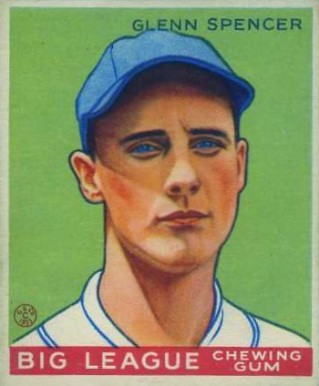
- Pitcher
- Born: September 11, 1905; Corning, New York, U.S.
- Died: December 30, 1958 (aged 53); Binghamton, New York, U.S.
- Batted: Right Threw: Right

MLB debut
- April 11, 1928, for the Pittsburgh Pirates

Last MLB appearance
- September 24, 1933, for the New York Giants

MLB statistics
- Win–loss record: 23–31
- Earned run average: 4.53
- Strikeouts: 162
- Stats at Baseball Reference

Teams
- Pittsburgh Pirates (1928, 1930–1932); New York Giants (1933)

Glenn Spencer (September 11, 1905 – December 30, 1958) was an American Major League Baseball pitcher who played five seasons with the Pittsburgh Pirates and the New York Giants of the National League from 1928 to 1933. His best season came in 1931 when he went 11–12 with a 3.42 earned run average in 38 games.
