= Art Jones (baseball) =

American baseball player and politician (1906-1980)

- Pitcher
- Born: February 7, 1906; Kershaw, South Carolina, U.S.
- Died: November 25, 1980 (aged 74); Columbia, South Carolina, U.S.
- Batted: Right Threw: Right

MLB debut
- April 23, 1932, for the Brooklyn Dodgers

Last MLB appearance
- April 23, 1932, for the Brooklyn Dodgers

MLB statistics
- Win–loss record: 0-0
- Earned run average: 18.00
- Strikeouts: 0
- Stats at Baseball Reference

Teams
- Brooklyn Dodgers (1932)

Arthur Lennox Jones (February 7, 1906 – November 25, 1980) was an American pitcher in Major League Baseball. He pitched in one game for the Brooklyn Dodgers on April 23, 1932. He worked one inning and gave up two hits and two runs. He attended Furman University, later served in the US Army during World War II, was a member of the South Carolina House of Representatives and was elected Mayor of Kershaw, South Carolina.
