= 1932 Chicago Cubs season =

1932 Chicago Cubs
- National League champions
- League: National League
- Ballpark: Wrigley Field
- City: Chicago
- Record: 90–64 (.584)
- League place: 1st
- Owners: William Wrigley Jr., Philip K. Wrigley
- Managers: Rogers Hornsby, Charlie Grimm
- Radio: WGN (Bob Elson); WBBM (Pat Flanagan); WMAQ (Hal Totten); WJKS (Johnny O'Hara)

The 1932 Chicago Cubs season was the 61st season of the Chicago Cubs franchise, the 57th in the National League and the 17th at Wrigley Field. The Cubs finished first in the National League with a record of 90–64, four games ahead of the second place Pittsburgh Pirates. The team was swept four games to none by the New York Yankees in the 1932 World Series.

== Regular season ==
=== Season standings ===
National League
Team	W	L	Pct.	GB	Home	Road
Chicago Cubs	90	64	.584	—	53‍–‍24	37‍–‍40
Pittsburgh Pirates	86	68	.558	4	45‍–‍31	41‍–‍37
Brooklyn Dodgers	81	73	.526	9	44‍–‍34	37‍–‍39
Philadelphia Phillies	78	76	.506	12	45‍–‍32	33‍–‍44
Boston Braves	77	77	.500	13	44‍–‍33	33‍–‍44
St. Louis Cardinals	72	82	.468	18	42‍–‍35	30‍–‍47
New York Giants	72	82	.468	18	37‍–‍40	35‍–‍42
Cincinnati Reds	60	94	.390	30	33‍–‍44	27‍–‍50

=== Record vs. opponents ===
1932 National League record Sources:
Team	BSN	BRO	CHC	CIN	NYG	PHI	PIT	STL
Boston	—	15–7	8–14	9–13	11–11	11–11	10–12	13–9–1
Brooklyn	7–15	—	10–12	15–7	15–7	8–14	12–10	14–8
Chicago	14–8	12–10	—	12–10	15–7	16–6	9–13	12–10
Cincinnati	13–9	7–15	10–12	—	7–15	9–13	8–14	6–16–1
New York	11–11	7–15	7–15	15–7	—	11–11	7–15	14–8
Philadelphia	11–11	14–8	6–16	13–9	11–11	—	14–8	9–13
Pittsburgh	12–10	10–12	13–9	14–8	15–7	8–14	—	14–8
St. Louis	9–13–1	8–14	10–12	16–6–1	8–14	13–9	8–14	—

=== Notable transactions ===
- August 3, 1932: Rogers Hornsby was released by the Cubs.

=== Roster ===
1932 Chicago Cubs
Roster
Pitchers: 16 Ed Baecht; 14 Guy Bush; 16 Burleigh Grimes; 23 Leroy Herrmann; 15 Pat Malone; 19 Jakie May; 27 Bobo Newsom; 12 Charlie Root; 18 Bob Smith; 21 Bud Tinning; 17 Lon Warneke; 41 Carroll Yerkes	Catchers: 7 Gabby Hartnett; 8 Rollie Hemsley; 34 Zack Taylor; Infielders: 1 Woody English; 6 Charlie Grimm; 31 Stan Hack; 2 Billy Herman; 11 Billy Jurges; 9 Mark Koenig; 19 Harry Taylor	Outfielders: 49 Vince Barton; 3 Kiki Cuyler; 51 Frank Demaree; 22 Marv Gudat; 9 Rogers Hornsby; 5 Johnny Moore; 56 Lance Richbourg; 4 Riggs Stephenson; -- Danny Taylor	Manager: 6 Charlie Grimm; 9 Rogers Hornsby; Coaches: 41 Red Corriden; 42 Charley O'Leary

== Player stats ==
=== Batting ===
==== Starters by position ====
Note: Pos = Position; G = Games played; AB = At bats; H = Hits; Avg. = Batting average; HR = Home runs; RBI = Runs batted in

Pos	Player	G	AB	H	Avg.	HR	RBI
C	Gabby Hartnett	121	406	110	.271	12	52
1B	Charlie Grimm	149	570	175	.307	7	80
2B	Billy Herman	154	656	206	.314	1	51
SS	Billy Jurges	115	396	100	.253	2	52
3B	Woody English	127	522	142	.272	3	47
OF	Riggs Stephenson	147	583	189	.324	4	85
OF	Kiki Cuyler	110	446	130	.291	10	77
OF	Johnny Moore	119	443	135	.305	13	64

==== Other batters ====
Note: G = Games played; AB = At bats; H = Hits; Avg. = Batting average; HR = Home runs; RBI = Runs batted in

Player	G	AB	H	Avg.	HR	RBI
Stan Hack	72	178	42	.236	2	19
Rollie Hemsley	60	151	36	.238	4	20
Lance Richbourg	44	148	38	.257	1	21
Vince Barton	36	134	30	.224	3	15
Mark Koenig	33	102	36	.353	3	11
Marv Gudat	60	94	24	.255	1	15
Rogers Hornsby	19	58	13	.224	1	7
Frank Demaree	23	56	14	.250	0	6
Zach Taylor	21	30	6	.200	0	3
Danny Taylor	6	22	5	.227	0	3
Harry Taylor	10	8	1	.125	0	0

=== Pitching ===
==== Starting pitchers ====
Note: G = Games pitched; IP = Innings pitched; W = Wins; L = Losses; ERA = Earned run average; SO = Strikeouts

Player	G	IP	W	L	ERA	SO
Lon Warneke	35	277.0	22	6	2.37	106
Guy Bush	40	238.2	19	11	3.21	73
Pat Malone	37	237.0	15	17	3.38	120

==== Other pitchers ====
Note: G = Games pitched; IP = Innings pitched; W = Wins; L = Losses; ERA = Earned run average; SO = Strikeouts

Player	G	IP	W	L	ERA	SO
Charlie Root	39	216.1	15	10	3.58	96
Burleigh Grimes	30	141.1	6	11	4.78	36
Bob Smith	34	119.0	4	3	4.61	35
Bud Tinning	24	93.1	5	3	2.80	30

==== Relief pitchers ====
Note: G = Games pitched; W = Wins; L = Losses; SV = Saves; ERA = Earned run average; SO = Strikeouts

Player	G	W	L	SV	ERA	SO
Jakie May	35	2	2	1	4.36	20
Leroy Herrmann	7	2	1	0	6.39	5
Carroll Yerkes	2	0	0	0	3.00	4
Ed Baecht	1	0	0	0	0.00	0
Bobo Newsome	1	0	0	0	0.00	0

== 1932 World Series ==
AL New York Yankees (4) vs. NL Chicago Cubs (0)

"Babe Ruth's called shot" was the home run hit by Babe Ruth in the fifth inning of Game 3 of the 1932 World Series, held on October 1, 1932, at Wrigley Field in Chicago. During the at bat, which came against Charlie Root, Ruth made a pointing gesture, which existing film confirms, but the exact nature of his gesture is ambiguous. Although neither fully confirmed nor refuted, the story goes that Ruth pointed to the center field bleachers during the at bat. It was supposedly a declaration that he would hit a home run to this part of the park. On the next pitch, Ruth hit a home run to center field.

Game	Score	Date	Location	Attendance
1	Cubs – 6, Yankees – 12	September 28	Yankee Stadium	41,459
2	Cubs – 2, Yankees – 5	September 29	Yankee Stadium	50,709
3	Yankees – 7, Cubs – 5	October 1	Wrigley Field	49,986
4	Yankees – 13, Cubs – 6	October 2	Wrigley Field	49,844

== Farm system ==
Level	Team	League	Manager
AA	Los Angeles Angels	Pacific Coast League	Jack Lelivelt
A	Wichita Aviators	Western League	Jimmy Payton
