= Eddie Delker =

American baseball player (1906–1997)

- Second baseman
- Born: April 17, 1906; Palo Alto, Pennsylvania, U.S.
- Died: May 14, 1997 (aged 91); Pottsville, Pennsylvania, U.S.
- Batted: Right Threw: Right

MLB debut
- April 28, 1929, for the St. Louis Cardinals

Last MLB appearance
- September 26, 1933, for the Philadelphia Phillies

MLB statistics
- Batting average: .155
- Home runs: 1
- Runs batted in: 15
- Stats at Baseball Reference

Teams
- St. Louis Cardinals (1929, 1931–1932); Philadelphia Phillies (1932–1933)

Edward Alberts Delker (April 17, 1906 – May 14, 1997) was an American Major League Baseball infielder. Delker made his debut for the St. Louis Cardinals on April 18, 1929. After playing for the Cardinals in parts of three major league seasons, his contract was purchased by the Philadelphia Phillies in 1932. In 1933, Delker was traded by the Phillies to the Cardinals with Spud Davis for Jimmy Wilson, but never played another major league game.
