= Tony Piet =

American baseball player (1906–1981)

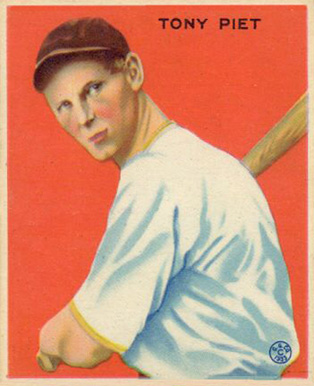
- Second baseman / Third baseman
- Born: December 7, 1906; Berwick, Pennsylvania, U.S.
- Died: December 1, 1981 (aged 74); Hinsdale, Illinois, U.S.
- Batted: Right Threw: Right

MLB debut
- August 15, 1931, for the Pittsburgh Pirates

Last MLB appearance
- October 2, 1938, for the Detroit Tigers

MLB statistics
- Batting average: .277
- Home runs: 23
- Runs batted in: 312
- Stats at Baseball Reference

Teams
- Pittsburgh Pirates (1931–1933); Cincinnati Reds (1934–1935); Chicago White Sox (1935–1937); Detroit Tigers (1938)

Anthony Francis Piet, born Anthony Francis Pietruszka (December 7, 1906 – December 1, 1981) was an American professional baseball infielder in Major League Baseball from 1931 to 1938.

== Biography ==
Piet played for the Pittsburgh Pirates, Cincinnati Reds, Chicago White Sox, and Detroit Tigers. He truncated his surname to Piet because Pietruszka couldn't fit on the Forbes Field scoreboard.

An all-around player, Piet was second in the National League in stolen bases (19) in 1932, and played the most games (154) of any player in the NL that year. In 1933, his batting average (.323) was the third highest in the NL. After retiring from baseball, he went on to found a car dealership in Chicago, whose slogan was "Shop for it anywhere, you'll buy it at Piet".

In 744 games, Piet batted .277 (717-2585) with 352 runs, 23 home runs and 312 RBI in an eight-year major league career.

== Illness and death ==
Piet died of a heart ailment at age 74 at Hinsdale Sanitarium and Hospital in Hinsdale, Illinois on December 1, 1981.
