= 1932 Major League Baseball season =

1932 MLB season
- League: American League (AL); National League (NL)
- Sport: Baseball
- Duration: Regular season: April 11 – September 25, 1932 (AL); April 12 – September 25, 1932 (NL); World Series: September 28 – October 2, 1932
- Games: 154
- Teams: 16 (8 per league)

Regular season
- Season MVP: AL: Jimmie Foxx (PHA); NL: Chuck Klein (PHI)
- AL champions: New York Yankees
- AL runners-up: Philadelphia Athletics
- NL champions: Chicago Cubs
- NL runners-up: Pittsburgh Pirates

World Series
- Champions: New York Yankees
- Runners-up: Chicago Cubs

MLB seasons
- ← 1931 1933 →

Locations of teams for the 1932 American League season
American League
Locations of teams for the 1932–1935 National League seasons
National League

The 1932 major league baseball season began on April 11, 1932. The regular season ended on September 25, with the Chicago Cubs and New York Yankees as the regular season champions of the National League and American League, respectively. The postseason began with Game 1 of the 29th World Series on September 28 and ended with Game 4 on October 2. The Yankees swept the Cubs in four games, capturing their fourth championship in franchise history, since their previous in 1928. Going into the season, the defending World Series champions were the St. Louis Cardinals from the 1931 season.

In the National League, the Brooklyn Robins reverted to their 1913 name, the Brooklyn Dodgers.

== Schedule ==
The 1932 schedule consisted of 154 games for all teams in the American League and National League, each of which had eight teams. Each team was scheduled to play 22 games against the other seven teams of their respective league. This continued the format put in place since the 1904 season (except for 1919) and would be used until 1961 in the American League and 1962 in the National League.

American League Opening Day took place on April 11 with the Boston Red Sox and Washington Senators playing, while National League Opening Day took place the following day. The final day of the regular season was on September 25 and featured all sixteen teams, continuing the trend which began with the 1930 season. The World Series took place between September 28 and October 2.

== Teams ==
An asterisk (*) denotes the ballpark a team played the minority of their home games at

League	Team	City	Ballpark	Capacity	Manager
American League	Boston Red Sox	Boston, Massachusetts	Fenway Park	27,000	Shano Collins
American League	Boston Red Sox	Boston, Massachusetts	Braves Field*	46,500*	Marty McManus
American League	Chicago White Sox	Chicago, Illinois	Comiskey Park	52,000	Lew Fonseca
American League	Cleveland Indians	Cleveland, Ohio	League Park	21,414	Roger Peckinpaugh
American League	Cleveland Indians	Cleveland, Ohio	Cleveland Stadium*	78,811*	Roger Peckinpaugh
American League	Detroit Tigers	Detroit, Michigan	Navin Field	30,000	Bucky Harris
American League	New York Yankees	New York, New York	Yankee Stadium	62,000	Joe McCarthy
American League	Philadelphia Athletics	Philadelphia, Pennsylvania	Shibe Park	33,000	Connie Mack
American League	St. Louis Browns	St. Louis, Missouri	Sportsman's Park	34,023	Bill Killefer
American League	Washington Senators	Washington, D.C.	Griffith Stadium	27,000	Walter Johnson
National League	Boston Braves	Boston, Massachusetts	Braves Field	46,500	Bill McKechnie
National League	Brooklyn Dodgers	New York, New York	Ebbets Field	32,000	Max Carey
National League	Chicago Cubs	Chicago, Illinois	Wrigley Field	40,000	Rogers Hornsby
National League	Chicago Cubs	Chicago, Illinois	Wrigley Field	40,000	Charlie Grimm
National League	Cincinnati Reds	Cincinnati, Ohio	Redland Field	26,060	Dan Howley
National League	New York Giants	New York, New York	Polo Grounds	56,000	John McGraw
National League	New York Giants	New York, New York	Polo Grounds	56,000	Bill Terry
National League	Philadelphia Phillies	Philadelphia, Pennsylvania	Baker Bowl	18,800	Burt Shotton
National League	Pittsburgh Pirates	Pittsburgh, Pennsylvania	Forbes Field	41,000	George Gibson
National League	St. Louis Cardinals	St. Louis, Missouri	Sportsman's Park	34,023	Gabby Street

== Standings ==
=== American League ===
American League
Team	W	L	Pct.	GB	Home	Road
New York Yankees	107	47	.695	—	62‍–‍15	45‍–‍32
Philadelphia Athletics	94	60	.610	13	51‍–‍26	43‍–‍34
Washington Senators	93	61	.604	14	51‍–‍26	42‍–‍35
Cleveland Indians	87	65	.572	19	43‍–‍33	44‍–‍32
Detroit Tigers	76	75	.503	29½	42‍–‍34	34‍–‍41
St. Louis Browns	63	91	.409	44	33‍–‍42	30‍–‍49
Chicago White Sox	49	102	.325	56½	28‍–‍49	21‍–‍53
Boston Red Sox	43	111	.279	64	27‍–‍50	16‍–‍61

=== National League ===
National League
Team	W	L	Pct.	GB	Home	Road
Chicago Cubs	90	64	.584	—	53‍–‍24	37‍–‍40
Pittsburgh Pirates	86	68	.558	4	45‍–‍31	41‍–‍37
Brooklyn Dodgers	81	73	.526	9	44‍–‍34	37‍–‍39
Philadelphia Phillies	78	76	.506	12	45‍–‍32	33‍–‍44
Boston Braves	77	77	.500	13	44‍–‍33	33‍–‍44
St. Louis Cardinals	72	82	.468	18	42‍–‍35	30‍–‍47
New York Giants	72	82	.468	18	37‍–‍40	35‍–‍42
Cincinnati Reds	60	94	.390	30	33‍–‍44	27‍–‍50

=== Tie games ===
5 tie games (3 in AL, 2 in NL), which are not factored into winning percentage or games behind (and were often replayed again) occurred throughout the season.

==== American League ====
- Chicago White Sox, 1
- Cleveland Indians, 1
- Detroit Tigers, 2
- New York Yankees, 2

==== National League ====
- Boston Braves, 1
- Cincinnati Reds, 1
- St. Louis Cardinals, 2

== Postseason ==
The postseason began on September 28 and ended on October 2 with the New York Yankees sweeping the Chicago Cubs in the 1932 World Series in four games.

=== Bracket ===
World Series
AL	New York Yankees	4
NL	Chicago Cubs	0

== Managerial changes ==
=== Off-season ===
Team	Former Manager	New Manager
Brooklyn Dodgers	Wilbert Robinson	Max Carey
Chicago White Sox	Donie Bush	Lew Fonseca
Pittsburgh Pirates	Jewel Ens	George Gibson

=== In-season ===
Team	Former Manager	New Manager
Boston Red Sox	Shano Collins	Marty McManus
Chicago Cubs	Rogers Hornsby	Charlie Grimm
New York Giants	John McGraw	Bill Terry

== League leaders ==
Any team shown in small text indicates a previous team a player was on during the season.

=== American League ===
Hitting leaders
Stat	Player	Total
AVG	Dale Alexander (BOS/DET)	.367
OPS	Jimmie Foxx (PHA)	1.218
HR	Jimmie Foxx (PHA)	58
RBI	Jimmie Foxx (PHA)	169
R	Jimmie Foxx (PHA)	151
H	Al Simmons (PHA)	216
SB	Ben Chapman (NYY)	38

Pitching leaders
Stat	Player	Total
W	Alvin Crowder (WSH)	26
L	Bump Hadley (SLB/CWS)	21
ERA	Lefty Grove (PHA)	2.84
K	Red Ruffing (NYY)	190
IP	Alvin Crowder (WSH)	327.0
SV	Firpo Marberry (WSH)	13
WHIP	Lefty Grove (PHA)	1.193

=== National League ===
Hitting leaders
Stat	Player	Total
AVG	Lefty O'Doul (BRO)	.368
OPS	Chuck Klein (PHI)	1.050
HR	Chuck Klein (PHI); Mel Ott (NYG)	38
RBI	Don Hurst (PHI)	143
R	Chuck Klein (PHI)	152
H	Chuck Klein (PHI)	226
SB	Chuck Klein (PHI)	20

Pitching leaders
Stat	Player	Total
W	Lon Warneke (CHC)	22
L	Ownie Carroll (CIN)	19
ERA	Lon Warneke (CHC)	2.37
K	Dizzy Dean (STL)	191
IP	Dizzy Dean (STL)	286.0
SV	Jack Quinn (BRO)	9
WHIP	Carl Hubbell (NYG)	1.056

== Milestones ==
=== Batters ===
==== Four home runs in one game ====
- Lou Gehrig (NYY):
  - Became the third player to hit four home runs in one game in a 20–13 win against the Philadelphia Athletics on June 3.

==== Cycles ====
- Tony Lazzeri (NYY):
  - Lazzeri hit for his first cycle, fifth in franchise history, and fourth natural cycle in major league history on June 3 against the Philadelphia Athletics.
- Mickey Cochrane (PHA):
  - Cochrane hit for his first cycle and fourth in franchise history, on July 22 against the Washington Senators.

==== Other batting accomplishments ====
- Johnny Burnett (CLE):
  - Set a Major League record for most hits in a single game when hit nine times in an 18-inning game against the Philadelphia Athletics on July 10.

== Awards and honors ==
=== Regular season ===
Baseball Writers' Association of America Awards
BBWAA Award	National League	American League
Most Valuable Player	Chuck Klein (PHI)	Jimmie Foxx (PHA)

The Sporting News Awards
Award	National League	American League
Most Valuable Player	Chuck Klein (PHI)	Jimmie Foxx (PHA)

== Home field attendance ==
Team name	Wins	%±	Home attendance	%±	Per game
Chicago Cubs	90	7.1%	974,688	−10.3%	12,658
New York Yankees	107	13.8%	962,320	5.5%	12,498
Brooklyn Dodgers	81	2.5%	681,827	−9.5%	8,741
Boston Braves	77	20.3%	507,606	−1.4%	6,592
New York Giants	72	−17.2%	484,868	−40.3%	6,297
Cleveland Indians	87	11.5%	468,953	−2.9%	6,090
Philadelphia Athletics	94	−12.1%	405,500	−35.4%	5,266
Detroit Tigers	76	24.6%	397,157	−8.5%	5,092
Washington Senators	93	1.1%	371,396	−24.6%	4,823
Cincinnati Reds	60	3.4%	356,950	35.6%	4,636
Pittsburgh Pirates	86	14.7%	287,262	10.3%	3,780
St. Louis Cardinals	72	−28.7%	279,219	−54.1%	3,534
Philadelphia Phillies	78	18.2%	268,914	−5.6%	3,492
Chicago White Sox	49	−12.5%	233,198	−42.2%	3,029
Boston Red Sox	43	−30.6%	182,150	−48.1%	2,366
St. Louis Browns	63	0.0%	112,558	−37.2%	1,501

== Venues ==
Across 77 homes games, the Boston Red Sox played their Tuesday, April 19 doubleheader against the New York Yankees and their first four of their 16 Sunday games at the Boston Braves home field of Braves Field (the remaining 71 home games were played at Fenway Park). This was the last of four consecutive season playing some (mostly Sunday) games at Braves Field.

Following their July 30 game against the Philadelphia Athletics, the Cleveland Indians leave League Park after playing 45 home games, and play the rest of their 32 home games at Cleveland Stadium, with the hopes of permanently moving in, starting with a game against the Athletics on July 31 (due to falling attendance, the Indians would move back to League Park full-time in 1934. The stadium was previously home of the single-season National Football League team that was also named the Cleveland Indians. This would be the 1st of 12 seasons since that saw the Indians play at both venues, occurring again in every season from 1936 to 1946. To this point, the Indians played all 32 of their seasons since their inaugural 1901 season at League Park.

== See also ==
- 1932 in baseball (Events, Births, Deaths)
