= 1933 Philadelphia Phillies season =

Major League Baseball season

1933 Philadelphia Phillies
- League: National League
- Ballpark: National League Park
- City: Philadelphia, Pennsylvania
- Owners: Gerald Nugent
- Managers: Burt Shotton

The 1933 Philadelphia Phillies season was the team's 51st season in Major League Baseball (MLB).

== Regular season ==
On May 1, 1933, the Phillies celebrated the franchise's fiftieth anniversary. The Phillies welcomed back former players to be introduced and cheered by the crowd, and play a five inning exhibition game prior to their regularly scheduled game against the Pittsburgh Pirates. Following the practice of the 1880s before the presence of a home clubhouse, the old timers dressed at The Bellevue-Stratford Hotel and were conveyed by a tallyho and horse-drawn carriages up Broad Street to National League Park accompanied by the Police and Fireman's Bands. Present were former Phillies players of the late 19th century and first decades of the 20th century including John Titus, Roy Thomas, Otto Knabe, Hans Lobert, Kitty Bransfield, Dick Hartley, Mickey Doolan, Red Dooin, Harry Coveleski, Al Maul, Jerry Donovan, George Andrews, Jack Clements, Monte Cross, Jess Pernell, Stan Baumgartner, and Charles Fulmer, who was 82-years old and had played for the 1875 Philadelphia White Stockings in the National Association.

=== Season standings ===
National League
| Team | W | L | Pct. | GB | Home | Road |
|---|---|---|---|---|---|---|
| New York Giants | 91 | 61 | .599 | — | 48‍–‍27 | 43‍–‍34 |
| Pittsburgh Pirates | 87 | 67 | .565 | 5 | 50‍–‍27 | 37‍–‍40 |
| Chicago Cubs | 86 | 68 | .558 | 6 | 56‍–‍23 | 30‍–‍45 |
| Boston Braves | 83 | 71 | .539 | 9 | 45‍–‍31 | 38‍–‍40 |
| St. Louis Cardinals | 82 | 71 | .536 | 9½ | 47‍–‍30 | 35‍–‍41 |
| Brooklyn Dodgers | 65 | 88 | .425 | 26½ | 36‍–‍41 | 29‍–‍47 |
| Philadelphia Phillies | 60 | 92 | .395 | 31 | 32‍–‍40 | 28‍–‍52 |
| Cincinnati Reds | 58 | 94 | .382 | 33 | 37‍–‍42 | 21‍–‍52 |

=== Record vs. opponents ===
1933 National League record Sources:
| Team | BSN | BRO | CHC | CIN | NYG | PHI | PIT | STL |
|---|---|---|---|---|---|---|---|---|
| Boston | — | 13–9–1 | 7–15 | 12–10 | 12–10–1 | 11–11 | 13–9 | 15–7 |
| Brooklyn | 9–13–1 | — | 9–13 | 10–12–1 | 8–14–2 | 13–9 | 7–15 | 9–12 |
| Chicago | 15–7 | 13–9 | — | 11–11 | 9–13 | 15–7 | 12–10 | 11–11 |
| Cincinnati | 10–12 | 12–10–1 | 11–11 | — | 4–17 | 7–14 | 7–15 | 7–15 |
| New York | 10–12–1 | 14–8–2 | 13–9 | 17–4 | — | 15–6 | 13–9 | 9–13–1 |
| Philadelphia | 11–11 | 9–13 | 7–15 | 14–7 | 6–15 | — | 7–15 | 6–16 |
| Pittsburgh | 9–13 | 15–7 | 10–12 | 15–7 | 9–13 | 15–7 | — | 14–8 |
| St. Louis | 7–15 | 12–9 | 11–11 | 15–7 | 13–9–1 | 16–6 | 8–14 | — |

=== Roster ===
1933 Philadelphia Phillies
Roster
| Pitchers: 20 Jack Berly; -- Charlie Butler; 16 Phil Collins; 17 Jumbo Elliott; 18 Reggie Grabowski; 19 Snipe Hansen; 21 Ed Holley; 28 John Jackson; 22 Ad Liska; 23 Cy Moore; 25 Frank Pearce; 18 Clarence Pickrel; 4 Frank Ragland; 24 Flint Rhem | Catchers: 8 Spud Davis; 9 Harry McCurdy; 10 Al Todd; Infielders: 2 Dick Bartell; 11 Eddie Delker; 4 Gus Dugas; 7 Neal Finn; 5 Mickey Haslin; 15 Don Hurst; 5 Fritz Knothe; 7 Jim McLeod; 12 Jack Warner; 5 Pinky Whitney | Outfielders: 14 Fred Brickell; 14 Alta Cohen; 1 Chick Fullis; 3 Chuck Klein; 6 Hal Lee; 6 Wes Schulmerich; Other batters: 31 Hugh Willingham | Manager: 26 Burt Shotton; Coaches: 27 Newt Hunter |

== Player stats ==
=== Batting ===
==== Starters by position ====
Note: Pos = Position; G = Games played; AB = At bats; H = Hits; Avg. = Batting average; HR = Home runs; RBI = Runs batted in

| Pos | Player | G | AB | H | Avg. | HR | RBI |
|---|---|---|---|---|---|---|---|
| C | Spud Davis | 141 | 495 | 173 | .349 | 9 | 65 |
| 1B | Don Hurst | 147 | 550 | 147 | .267 | 8 | 76 |
| 2B | Jack Warner | 107 | 340 | 76 | .224 | 0 | 22 |
| SS | Dick Bartell | 152 | 587 | 159 | .271 | 1 | 37 |
| 3B | Jim McLeod | 67 | 232 | 45 | .194 | 0 | 15 |
| OF | Chuck Klein | 152 | 606 | 223 | .368 | 28 | 120 |
| OF | Wes Schulmerich | 97 | 365 | 122 | .334 | 8 | 59 |
| OF | Chick Fullis | 151 | 647 | 200 | .309 | 1 | 45 |

==== Other batters ====
Note: G = Games played; AB = At bats; H = Hits; Avg. = Batting average; HR = Home runs; RBI = Runs batted in

| Player | G | AB | H | Avg. | HR | RBI |
|---|---|---|---|---|---|---|
| Neal Finn | 51 | 169 | 40 | .237 | 0 | 13 |
| Hal Lee | 46 | 167 | 48 | .287 | 0 | 12 |
| Al Todd | 73 | 136 | 28 | .206 | 0 | 10 |
| Pinky Whitney | 31 | 121 | 32 | .264 | 3 | 19 |
| Fritz Knothe | 41 | 113 | 17 | .150 | 0 | 11 |
| Mickey Haslin | 26 | 89 | 21 | .236 | 0 | 9 |
| Gus Dugas | 37 | 71 | 12 | .169 | 0 | 9 |
| Harry McCurdy | 73 | 54 | 15 | .278 | 2 | 12 |
| Eddie Delker | 25 | 41 | 7 | .171 | 0 | 1 |
| Alta Cohen | 19 | 32 | 6 | .188 | 0 | 1 |
| Fred Brickell | 8 | 13 | 4 | .308 | 0 | 1 |
| Hugh Willingham | 1 | 1 | 0 | .000 | 0 | 0 |

=== Pitching ===
==== Starting pitchers ====
Note: G = Games pitched; IP = Innings pitched; W = Wins; L = Losses; ERA = Earned run average; SO = Strikeouts

| Player | G | IP | W | L | ERA | SO |
|---|---|---|---|---|---|---|
| Ed Holley | 30 | 206.2 | 13 | 15 | 3.53 | 56 |
| Snipe Hansen | 32 | 168.1 | 6 | 14 | 4.44 | 47 |
| John Jackson | 10 | 54.0 | 2 | 2 | 6.00 | 11 |

==== Other pitchers ====
Note: G = Games pitched; IP = Innings pitched; W = Wins; L = Losses; ERA = Earned run average; SO = Strikeouts

| Player | G | IP | W | L | ERA | SO |
|---|---|---|---|---|---|---|
| Jumbo Elliott | 35 | 161.2 | 6 | 10 | 3.84 | 43 |
| Cy Moore | 36 | 161.1 | 8 | 9 | 3.74 | 53 |
| Phil Collins | 42 | 151.0 | 8 | 13 | 4.11 | 40 |
| Flint Rhem | 28 | 125.0 | 5 | 14 | 6.62 | 27 |
| Frank Pearce | 20 | 82.0 | 5 | 4 | 3.62 | 18 |
| Jack Berly | 13 | 50.0 | 2 | 3 | 5.04 | 4 |
| Reggie Grabowski | 10 | 48.0 | 1 | 3 | 2.44 | 9 |
| Frank Ragland | 11 | 38.1 | 0 | 4 | 6.81 | 4 |

==== Relief pitchers ====
Note: G = Games pitched; W = Wins; L = Losses; SV = Saves; ERA = Earned run average; SO = Strikeouts

| Player | G | W | L | SV | ERA | SO |
|---|---|---|---|---|---|---|
| Ad Liska | 45 | 3 | 1 | 1 | 4.52 | 23 |
| Clarence Pickrel | 9 | 1 | 0 | 0 | 3.95 | 6 |
| Charlie Butler | 1 | 0 | 0 | 0 | 9.00 | 0 |
