= 1933 Boston Braves season =

1933 Boston Braves
- League: National League
- Ballpark: Braves Field
- City: Boston, Massachusetts
- Record: 83–71 (.539)
- League place: 4th
- Owners: Emil Fuchs
- Managers: Bill McKechnie
- Radio: WNAC (Fred Hoey)

The 1933 Boston Braves season was the 63rd season of the franchise.

== Offseason ==
- December 29, 1932: Shanty Hogan was purchased by the Braves from the New York Giants for $25,000.

== Regular season ==
=== Season standings ===
National League
Team	W	L	Pct.	GB	Home	Road
New York Giants	91	61	.599	—	48‍–‍27	43‍–‍34
Pittsburgh Pirates	87	67	.565	5	50‍–‍27	37‍–‍40
Chicago Cubs	86	68	.558	6	56‍–‍23	30‍–‍45
Boston Braves	83	71	.539	9	45‍–‍31	38‍–‍40
St. Louis Cardinals	82	71	.536	9½	47‍–‍30	35‍–‍41
Brooklyn Dodgers	65	88	.425	26½	36‍–‍41	29‍–‍47
Philadelphia Phillies	60	92	.395	31	32‍–‍40	28‍–‍52
Cincinnati Reds	58	94	.382	33	37‍–‍42	21‍–‍52

=== Record vs. opponents ===
1933 National League record Sources:
Team	BSN	BRO	CHC	CIN	NYG	PHI	PIT	STL
Boston	—	13–9–1	7–15	12–10	12–10–1	11–11	13–9	15–7
Brooklyn	9–13–1	—	9–13	10–12–1	8–14–2	13–9	7–15	9–12
Chicago	15–7	13–9	—	11–11	9–13	15–7	12–10	11–11
Cincinnati	10–12	12–10–1	11–11	—	4–17	7–14	7–15	7–15
New York	10–12–1	14–8–2	13–9	17–4	—	15–6	13–9	9–13–1
Philadelphia	11–11	9–13	7–15	14–7	6–15	—	7–15	6–16
Pittsburgh	9–13	15–7	10–12	15–7	9–13	15–7	—	14–8
St. Louis	7–15	12–9	11–11	15–7	13–9–1	16–6	8–14	—

=== Notable transactions ===
- July 31, 1933: Bob Smith was selected off waivers by the Braves from the Cincinnati Reds.

=== Roster ===
1933 Boston Braves
Roster
Pitchers: 18 Huck Betts; 11,14 Ed Brandt; 17 Bob Brown; 16 Ben Cantwell; 24 Ed Fallenstein; 20 Fred Frankhouse; 21 Leo Mangum; 19 Socks Seibold; 12 Bob Smith; 26 Ray Starr; 15 Tom Zachary	Catchers: 23 Pinky Hargrave; 8 Shanty Hogan; 9 Al Spohrer; Infielders: 12 Hod Ford; 27 Dick Gyselman; 5 Buck Jordan; 7 Fritz Knothe; 1 Rabbit Maranville; 6 Billy Urbanski; 7 Pinky Whitney; 26 Al Wright	Outfielders: 3 Wally Berger; 22 Earl Clark; 10 Dutch Holland; 14 Hal Lee; 4 Randy Moore; 10 Joe Mowry; 11,14 Wes Schulmerich; 22 Tommy Thompson; 2 Red Worthington	Manager: 33 Bill McKechnie; Coaches: 31 Hank Gowdy; 32 Duffy Lewis

== Player stats ==
=== Batting ===
==== Starters by position ====
Note: Pos = Position; G = Games played; AB = At bats; H = Hits; Avg. = Batting average; HR = Home runs; RBI = Runs batted in

Pos	Player	G	AB	H	Avg.	HR	RBI
C	Shanty Hogan	96	328	83	.253	3	30
1B	Buck Jordan	152	588	168	.286	4	46
2B	Rabbit Maranville	143	478	104	.218	0	38
SS	Billy Urbanski	144	566	142	.251	0	35
3B	Pinky Whitney	100	382	94	.246	8	49
OF	Hal Lee	88	312	69	.221	1	28
OF	Randy Moore	135	497	150	.302	8	70
OF	Wally Berger	137	528	165	.313	27	106

==== Other batters ====
Note: G = Games played; AB = At bats; H = Hits; Avg. = Batting average; HR = Home runs; RBI = Runs batted in

Player	G	AB	H	Avg.	HR	RBI
Joe Mowry	86	249	55	.221	0	20
Al Spohrer	67	184	46	.250	1	12
Fritz Knothe	44	158	36	.228	1	6
Dick Gyselman	58	155	37	.239	0	12
Tommy Thompson	24	97	18	.186	0	6
Wes Schulmerich	29	85	21	.247	1	13
Pinky Hargrave	45	73	13	.178	0	6
Red Worthington	17	45	7	.156	0	0
Dutch Holland	13	31	8	.258	0	3
Earl Clark	7	23	8	.348	0	1
Hod Ford	5	15	1	.067	0	1
Al Wright	4	1	1	1.000	0	0

=== Pitching ===
==== Starting pitchers ====
Note: G = Games pitched; IP = Innings pitched; W = Wins; L = Losses; ERA = Earned run average; SO = Strikeouts

Player	G	IP	W	L	ERA	SO
Ed Brandt	41	287.2	18	14	2.60	104
Ben Cantwell	40	254.2	20	10	2.62	57
Fred Frankhouse	43	244.2	16	15	3.16	83
Huck Betts	35	242.0	11	11	2.79	40
Tom Zachary	26	125.0	7	9	3.53	22

==== Other pitchers ====
Note: G = Games pitched; IP = Innings pitched; W = Wins; L = Losses; ERA = Earned run average; SO = Strikeouts

Player	G	IP	W	L	ERA	SO
Leo Mangum	25	84.0	4	3	3.32	28
Bob Smith	14	58.2	4	3	3.22	16
Socks Seibold	11	36.2	1	5	3.68	10
Ed Fallenstein	9	35.0	2	1	3.60	5

==== Relief pitchers ====
Note: G = Games pitched; W = Wins; L = Losses; SV = Saves; ERA = Earned run average; SO = Strikeouts

Player	G	W	L	SV	ERA	SO
Ray Starr	9	0	1	0	3.86	15
Bob Brown	5	0	0	0	2.70	3

== Farm system ==
Level	Team	League	Manager
A	Harrisburg Senators	New York–Pennsylvania League	Eddie Onslow
B	New Bedford Whalers	New England League	Freddie Maguire
