= 1933 Brooklyn Dodgers season =

1933 Brooklyn Dodgers
- League: National League
- Ballpark: Ebbets Field
- City: Brooklyn, New York
- Record: 65–88 (.425)
- League place: 6th
- Owners: Stephen McKeever, Brooklyn Trust Company
- President: Stephen McKeever
- Managers: Max Carey

The 1933 Brooklyn Dodgers finished in sixth place. After the season, manager Max Carey was fired and replaced by coach Casey Stengel.

== Offseason ==
- December 15, 1932: Cy Moore, Neal Finn and Jack Warner were traded by the Dodgers to the Philadelphia Phillies for Ray Benge and cash.
- January 7, 1933: Ike Boone was purchased from the Dodgers by the Detroit Tigers.
- February 8, 1933: Dazzy Vance and Gordon Slade were traded by the Dodgers to the St. Louis Cardinals for Jake Flowers and Ownie Carroll.

== Regular season ==
=== Season standings ===
National League
Team	W	L	Pct.	GB	Home	Road
New York Giants	91	61	.599	—	48‍–‍27	43‍–‍34
Pittsburgh Pirates	87	67	.565	5	50‍–‍27	37‍–‍40
Chicago Cubs	86	68	.558	6	56‍–‍23	30‍–‍45
Boston Braves	83	71	.539	9	45‍–‍31	38‍–‍40
St. Louis Cardinals	82	71	.536	9½	47‍–‍30	35‍–‍41
Brooklyn Dodgers	65	88	.425	26½	36‍–‍41	29‍–‍47
Philadelphia Phillies	60	92	.395	31	32‍–‍40	28‍–‍52
Cincinnati Reds	58	94	.382	33	37‍–‍42	21‍–‍52

=== Record vs. opponents ===
1933 National League record Sources:
Team	BSN	BRO	CHC	CIN	NYG	PHI	PIT	STL
Boston	—	13–9–1	7–15	12–10	12–10–1	11–11	13–9	15–7
Brooklyn	9–13–1	—	9–13	10–12–1	8–14–2	13–9	7–15	9–12
Chicago	15–7	13–9	—	11–11	9–13	15–7	12–10	11–11
Cincinnati	10–12	12–10–1	11–11	—	4–17	7–14	7–15	7–15
New York	10–12–1	14–8–2	13–9	17–4	—	15–6	13–9	9–13–1
Philadelphia	11–11	9–13	7–15	14–7	6–15	—	7–15	6–16
Pittsburgh	9–13	15–7	10–12	15–7	9–13	15–7	—	14–8
St. Louis	7–15	12–9	11–11	15–7	13–9–1	16–6	8–14	—

=== Notable transactions ===
- May 14, 1933: Max Rosenfeld was purchased from the Dodgers by the Washington Senators.
- June 16, 1933: Lefty O'Doul and Watty Clark were traded by the Dodgers to the New York Giants for Sam Leslie.

=== Roster ===
1933 Brooklyn Dodgers
Roster
Pitchers: 30 Boom-Boom Beck; 28 Ray Benge; 15 Ownie Carroll; 17 Watty Clark; 18 Fred Heimach; 27 Dutch Leonard; 39 Ray Lucas; 16 Van Mungo; 35 Rosy Ryan; 21 Joe Shaute; 20 Sloppy Thurston	Catchers: 10 Al López; 19 Chink Outen; 12 Val Picinich; 11 Clyde Sukeforth; Infielders: 14 Del Bissonette; -- Lu Blue; 5 Tony Cuccinello; 18 Bert Delmas; 8 Jake Flowers; 11 Lonny Frey; 24 Jimmy Jordan; 2 Joe Judge; 6 Sam Leslie; 3 Joe Stripp; 7 Glenn Wright	Outfielders: 17 Buzz Boyle; 1 Johnny Frederick; 14 Joe Hutcheson; 6 Lefty O'Doul; 25 Max Rosenfeld; 9 Danny Taylor; 4 Hack Wilson	Manager: 33 Max Carey; Coaches: 32 Otto Miller; 31 Casey Stengel

== Player stats ==
=== Batting ===
==== Starters by position ====
Note: Pos = Position; G = Games played; AB = At bats; H = Hits; Avg. = Batting average; HR = Home runs; RBI = Runs batted in

Pos	Player	G	AB	H	Avg.	HR	RBI
C	Al López	126	372	112	.301	3	41
1B	Sam Leslie	96	361	104	.286	5	46
2B	Tony Cuccinello	134	485	122	.252	9	65
3B	Joe Stripp	141	537	149	.277	1	51
SS	Jimmy Jordan	70	211	54	.256	0	17
OF	Johnny Frederick	147	556	171	.308	7	64
OF	Danny Taylor	103	358	102	.285	9	40
OF	Buzz Boyle	93	338	101	.299	0	31

==== Other batters ====
Note: G = Games played; AB = At bats; H = Hits; Avg. = Batting average; HR = Home runs; RBI = Runs batted in

Player	G	AB	H	Avg.	HR	RBI
Hack Wilson	117	360	96	.267	9	54
Jake Flowers	78	210	49	.233	2	22
Glenn Wright	71	192	49	.255	1	18
Joe Hutcheson	55	184	43	.234	6	21
Lefty O'Doul	43	159	40	.252	5	21
Chink Outen	93	153	38	.248	4	17
Lonny Frey	34	135	43	.319	0	12
Del Bissonette	35	114	28	.246	1	10
Joe Judge	42	112	24	.214	0	9
Clyde Sukeforth	20	36	2	.056	0	0
Bert Delmas	12	28	7	.250	0	0
Max Rosenfeld	5	9	1	.111	0	0
Val Picinich	6	6	1	.167	0	0
Lu Blue	1	1	0	.000	0	0

=== Pitching ===
==== Starting pitchers ====
Note: G = Games pitched; IP = Innings pitched; W = Wins; L = Losses; ERA = Earned run average; SO = Strikeouts

Player	G	IP	W	L	ERA	SO
Boom-Boom Beck	43	257.0	12	20	3.54	89
Van Mungo	41	248.0	16	15	2.72	110
Ray Benge	37	228.2	10	17	3.42	74
Ownie Carroll	33	226.1	13	15	3.78	45
Watty Clark	11	50.2	2	4	4.80	14

==== Other pitchers ====
Note: G = Games pitched; IP = Innings pitched; W = Wins; L = Losses; ERA = Earned run average; SO = Strikeouts

Player	G	IP	W	L	ERA	SO
Sloppy Thurston	32	131.1	6	8	4.52	22
Dutch Leonard	10	40.0	2	3	2.93	6
Fred Heimach	10	29.2	0	1	10.01	7

==== Relief pitchers ====
Note: G = Games pitched; W = Wins; L = Losses; SV = Saves; ERA = Earned run average; SO = Strikeouts

Player	G	W	L	SV	ERA	SO
Joe Shaute	41	3	4	2	3.49	26
Rosy Ryan	30	1	1	2	4.55	22
Ray Lucas	2	0	0	0	7.20	0

== Awards and honors ==
- 1933 Major League Baseball All-Star Game
  - Tony Cuccinello reserve

== Farm system ==
Level	Team	League	Manager
A	York White Roses	New York–Pennsylvania League	Hans Lobert; Charley Moore
