= 1933 in baseball =

The following are the baseball events of the year 1933 throughout the world.

== Headline Events of the Year ==
- First Major League Baseball All-Star Game, July 6 at Comiskey Park: American League, 4–2.
- First Negro League Baseball All-Star Game, September 10, also at Comiskey Park: West, 11–7.

== Champions ==
=== Major League Baseball ===
- World Series: New York Giants over Washington Senators (4–1)
- First All-Star Game, July 6 at Comiskey Park: American League, 4–2

=== Other champions ===
- The Negro National League was the only Negro league operating this season. The Chicago American Giants won the pennant.
- First Negro League Baseball All-Star Game, September 10 at Comiskey Park: West, 11–7

== Awards and honors ==
- Most Valuable Player
  - Jimmie Foxx, Philadelphia Athletics, 1B (AL)
  - Carl Hubbell, New York Giants, P (NL)

== Statistical leaders ==
	American League		National League		Negro National League	
Stat	Player	Total	Player	Total	Player	Total
AVG	Jimmie Foxx^{1} (PHA)	.356	Chuck Klein^{2} (PHI)	.368	Jabbo Andrews (CBB)	.398
HR	Jimmie Foxx^{1} (PHA)	48	Chuck Klein^{2} (PHI)	28	Josh Gibson (PC)	18
RBI	Jimmie Foxx^{1} (PHA)	163	Chuck Klein^{2} (PHI)	120	Josh Gibson (PC)	74
W	Alvin Crowder (WSH); Lefty Grove (PHA)	24	Carl Hubbell (NYG)	23	Bertrum Hunter (PC/AKR)	11
ERA	Mel Harder (CLE)	2.95	Carl Hubbell (NYG)	1.66	Satchel Paige (PC)	1.94
K	Lefty Gomez (NYY)	163	Dizzy Dean (STL)	199	Leroy Matlock (PC)	100

^{1} American League Triple Crown batting winner
^{2} National League Triple Crown batting winner

== Major league baseball final standings ==
=== American League final standings ===
American League
Team	W	L	Pct.	GB	Home	Road
Washington Senators	99	53	.651	—	46‍–‍30	53‍–‍23
New York Yankees	91	59	.607	7	51‍–‍23	40‍–‍36
Philadelphia Athletics	79	72	.523	19½	46‍–‍29	33‍–‍43
Cleveland Indians	75	76	.497	23½	45‍–‍32	30‍–‍44
Detroit Tigers	75	79	.487	25	43‍–‍35	32‍–‍44
Chicago White Sox	67	83	.447	31	35‍–‍41	32‍–‍42
Boston Red Sox	63	86	.423	34½	32‍–‍40	31‍–‍46
St. Louis Browns	55	96	.364	43½	30‍–‍46	25‍–‍50

Locations of teams for the 1933 American League season
American League

=== National League final standings ===
National League
Team	W	L	Pct.	GB	Home	Road
New York Giants	91	61	.599	—	48‍–‍27	43‍–‍34
Pittsburgh Pirates	87	67	.565	5	50‍–‍27	37‍–‍40
Chicago Cubs	86	68	.558	6	56‍–‍23	30‍–‍45
Boston Braves	83	71	.539	9	45‍–‍31	38‍–‍40
St. Louis Cardinals	82	71	.536	9½	47‍–‍30	35‍–‍41
Brooklyn Dodgers	65	88	.425	26½	36‍–‍41	29‍–‍47
Philadelphia Phillies	60	92	.395	31	32‍–‍40	28‍–‍52
Cincinnati Reds	58	94	.382	33	37‍–‍42	21‍–‍52

Locations of teams for the 1932–1935 National League seasons
National League

== Negro leagues final standings ==
All Negro leagues standings below are per Seamheads.

=== Negro National League final standings ===
vs. Negro National League						vs. Major Black Teams			
Negro National League	W	L	T	Pct.	GB	W	L	T	Pct.
^{(2)} Chicago American Giants	36	15	0	.706	½	40	24	1	.623
^{(1)} Pittsburgh Crawfords	38	16	0	.704	—	56	37	2	.600
Nashville Elite Giants	21	24	1	.467	12½	23	27	1	.461
Baltimore Sox	11	13	0	.458	12	20	23	1	.466
Homestead Grays	7	12	1	.375	13½	16	14	3	.530
Indianapolis ABCs / Detroit Stars	19	33	0	.365	18	19	34	0	.358
Columbus Blue Birds†	14	28	0	.333	18	15	29	0	.341
Akron Grays / Cleveland Giants†	3	8	0	.273	13½	3	8	0	.273

^{(1)} First half champion ^{(2)} Second half champion
†Columbus folds mid-season, after the end of the first half of the split season. The remnants merged with the Akron Black Tyrites as the Akron Grays. Homestead was expelled for raiding players.

==== Post-season ====
- Chicago won the first half, Pittsburgh won the second half.
- Pittsburgh beat Chicago 1 game to 0 games (1 tie) in a play-off.
Locations of teams for the 1933 Negro National League season
Negro National League
Notes: Chicago American Giants were forced out of Chicago early in the season, finishing their season in Indianapolis.
Indianapolis ABCs early in the season move to Detroit.
Columbus Blue Birds disband mid-season. Remnants merge with Akron Black Tyrites as Akron Grays, eventually move to Cleveland as Cleveland Giants for one game.

=== Independent teams final standings ===
A loose confederation of teams existed that were not part of the Negro National League.

vs. All Teams
Independent Clubs	W	L	T	Pct.	GB
Brooklyn Royal Giants	1	0	0	1.000	4
Kansas City Monarchs	4	2	0	.667	3½
Philadelphia Stars	22	13	0	.629	—
New York Black Yankees	10	9	0	.526	4
Cuban Stars (East)	4	4	0	.500	4½
Pollock's Cuban Stars	2	4	1	.357	5½
Philadelphia Bacharach Giants	1	8	1	.150	8

== Events ==
- As a rookie with the San Francisco Seals of the Pacific Coast League, Joe DiMaggio hit safely in 61 consecutive games, breaking the PCL record of 49 games set by Jack Ness in 1914.

=== January ===
- January 7 – The Cleveland Indians trade Luke Sewell to the Washington Senators for Roy Spencer.

=== February ===
- February 9 – Brooklyn Dodgers and future Hall of Fame pitcher Dazzy Vance is traded to the St. Louis Cardinals along with infielder Gordon Slade in exchange for pitcher Ownie Carroll and infielder Jake Flowers.

=== March ===
- March 11 – An earthquake hits the Los Angeles area, interrupting an exhibition game between the Chicago Cubs and New York Giants. Players from both teams were forced to huddle around the center of the diamond until the tremors stopped.
- March 24 – Babe Ruth, another victim of the Great Depression, takes a pay cut of $23,000 from his previous salary of $75,000.

=== April ===
- April 12 – The Cleveland Indians defeat the Detroit Tigers, 4–1, in thirteen innings on Opening Day.
- April 25 :
  - During the New York Yankees' 16–0 drubbing of the Washington Senators, speedy Yankee outfielder Ben Chapman spikes Senators' second baseman Buddy Myer, leading to a wild 20-minute brawl. 300 fans join in, and all the involved players are suspended for five games and fined $100.
  - Philadelphia Phillies shortstop Dick Bartell is four-for-four with four doubles in the Phillies' 7–1 victory over the Boston Braves.

=== May ===
- May 16 – The Washington Senators beat the Cleveland Indians, 11–10, in twelve innings. Cleveland uses five pitchers; Washington uses six. The combined eleven pitchers used was at the time a record.
- May 30 – John Stone of the Detroit Tigers becomes the first player in major league history to collect six extra base hits in a regulation length doubleheader‚ as he hit four doubles and two home runs against the St. Louis Browns.

=== June ===
- June 14 – Both New York Yankees manager Joe McCarthy and first baseman Lou Gehrig are ejected from a game. McCarthy is suspended for three games. Gehrig is luckily not suspended, thus keeping his iron man streak intact.
- June 16 – The New York Giants trade Sam Leslie to the Brooklyn Dodgers for Watty Clark and Lefty O'Doul.
- June 17 – The Philadelphia Phillies trade Hal Lee and Pinky Whitney to the Boston Braves for Wes Schulmerich and Fritz Knothe.

=== July ===
- July 2 – The New York Giants' Carl Hubbell tied an MLB record for the longest shutout when he needed 18 innings to beat the St Louis Cardinals 1–0.
- July 6 – The first Major League Baseball All-Star Game was held in Comiskey Park, Chicago, home of the Chicago White Sox. The American League defeated the National League, 4–2, highlighted by Babe Ruth's third inning home run.
- July 19 – Rick and Wes Ferrell become the first brothers on opposing teams to hit home runs in the same game, as Wes' Indians defeat Rick's BoSox, 8–7, in thirteen innings.
- July 22 – The Washington Senators and New York Yankees are tied for first with 55–32 records. Washington beats the Detroit Tigers 4–3, while the Yanks fall to the Cleveland Indians 2–1. Washington maintains sole possession of first place for the remainder of the season.
- July 26 – Rogers Hornsby joins the St. Louis Browns.
- July 30 – St. Louis Cardinals pitcher Dizzy Dean set a modern major league record striking out 17 Chicago Cubs batters. Besides, his battery teammate Jimmie Wilson also sets a new mark for a catcher while recording 18 putouts.

=== August ===
- August 4 – For the second game in a row, the New York Giants defeat the Philadelphia Phillies 18–1.
- August 14 – 1933 American League MVP Jimmie Foxx hits for the cycle, and drives in nine runs to lead the Philadelphia Athletics to an 11–5 victory over the Cleveland Indians.
- August 22 – The Detroit Tigers defeat the Washington Senators 10–8, snapping Washington's thirteen-game winning streak.
- August 29 – The Chicago Cubs team that played the Brooklyn Dodgers featured Billy Herman playing second base, Babe Herman playing right field and Leroy Herrmann pitching.
- August 31 – Right-handed Dutch Leonard makes his major league debut, pitching 7.1 innings and giving up three earned runs in the Brooklyn Dodgers' 10–3 loss to the St. Louis Cardinals.

=== September ===
- September 1 – New York Giants pitcher Carl Hubbell throws a 10-inning, four-hit shutout and drives in the winning run in a 2–0 victory over the Boston Braves. Hubbell does not walk a batter and never goes as deep as a 3–2 count on any of them. It is both his 20th win and his 10th shutout of the year, while five of the shutouts are 1–0, to set a National League season-record. Braves' pitcher Fred Frankhouse is the hard-luck loser when his mates make two crucial errors in the 10th inning.
- September 8 - In the second game of a double header against the Detroit Tigers, Mel Almada makes his MLB debut for the Boston Red Sox. Almada makes history as the first player born in Mexico to play in the major leagues.

=== October ===
- October 1 :
  - At Yankee Stadium, Babe Ruth attracts 25‚000 fans as he takes the mound against the Boston Red Sox. Ruth hits a fifth-inning home run and takes a 6–0 lead into the sixth inning‚ then hangs on for a 6–5, complete-game victory. Boston pitcher Bob Kline takes the loss. The Yankees back the Babe with 18 outfield putouts. It is the final pitching appearance of his career. Ruth now has ten winning seasons in ten years as a pitcher‚ a mark that will be matched in 2004 by Andy Pettitte. Ruth's record on the mound for the Yankees is a perfect 5–0.
  - At 57 years old, former Washington Senators pitcher and current coach Nick Altrock takes a pinch hit at-bat in the Senators' eleven inning 3–0 loss to the Philadelphia A's.
- October 3 – Mel Ott's two-run home run in the first gives the New York Giants the early lead in game one of the 1933 World Series at the Polo Grounds. They go on to win 4–2.
- October 4 – A six-run sixth inning and superb pitching by Hal Schumacher carry the Giants to victory in game two of the World Series.
- October 5 – Earl Whitehill shuts out the Giants in game three of the World Series, as Washington takes game three, 4–0.
- October 6 – Blondy Ryan's eleventh-inning single gives the Giants the 2–1 victory in game four of the World Series.
- October 7 – In Game 5 of the World Series, the Giants defeat the Senators 4–3 in ten innings, to win their fourth World Championship, four games to one. This would be the last World Series the Senators franchise would play in the nation's capital.

=== November ===
- November 15:
  - The St. Louis Cardinals trade Jimmie Wilson to the Philadelphia Phillies for Spud Davis and Eddie Delker.
  - The New York Giants trade Glenn Spencer to the Cincinnati Reds for George Grantham.
- November 21 – Philadelphia Phillies right fielder Chuck Klein, who won the National League Triple Crown after hitting .368 with 28 home runs and 120 RBI, is sold to the Cubs for $125,000 and three players. Klein, who also led the NL in hits (223), doubles (44), extra bases (79), total bases (365), slugging (.602), on-base % (.422) and OPS (1.025), and finished second in runs (102) and fourth in stolen bases (15), is the only player in major league history to be traded after a Triple Crown season.

=== December ===
- December 12 – The Philadelphia Athletics trade Lefty Grove, Max Bishop, and Rube Walberg to the Boston Red Sox for Bob Kline, Rabbit Warstler and $125,000. They also send Mickey Cochrane to the Detroit Tigers for Johnny Pasek and $100,000, then package Pasek with George Earnshaw, and send them to the Chicago White Sox for Charlie Berry and $20,000.
- December 20 – The Washington Senators trade Goose Goslin to the Detroit Tigers for John Stone.

== Movies ==
- Elmer, the Great

== Births ==
=== January ===
- January 1 – Gene Host
- January 2 – Bill Oster
- January 4 – Ramón Monzant
- January 6:
  - Lenny Green
  - Lee Walls
- January 8 – Willie Tasby
- January 12 – Audrey Bleiler
- January 15 – Bobby Durnbaugh
- January 17 – Jay Porter
- January 20 – Gene Stephens
- January 21 – Rita Keller
- January 23 – Wally Shannon
- January 25 – Mel Roach

=== February ===
- February 2 – Jack Reed
- February 4 – Shirley Burkovich
- February 10:
  - Jerry Davie
  - Russ Heman
  - Billy O'Dell
- February 14 – Tom Borland
- February 26 – Johnny Blanchard
- February 27 – Sammy Taylor
- February 28 – Bill Kern

=== March ===
- March 4 – John Easton
- March 6 – Ted Abernathy
- March 7 – Ed Bouchee
- March 11:
  - Ann Garman
  - Jack Spring
- March 15 – Dick Scott
- March 20 – George Altman
- March 25 – Nelson Chittum
- March 27 – Don Lassetter

=== April ===
- April 3:
  - Jerry Dale
  - Renae Youngberg
- April 4 – Ted Wieand
- April 7:
  - Bobby Del Greco
  - Joe Hicks
- April 8 – Lloyd Merritt
- April 11 – Futoshi Nakanishi
- April 12:
  - Terry Cooney
  - Charley Lau
- April 22 – Bob Schmidt
- April 25 – Joyce Ricketts
- April 29 – Ed Charles

=== May ===
- May 5 – Joe McClain
- May 13 – John Roseboro
- May 16 – Bob Bruce
- May 18 – Carroll Hardy
- May 22 – Miguel Sotelo
- May 26 – Ramón López

=== June ===
- June 2:
  - Jerry Lumpe
  - Benny Valenzuela
- June 4 – Arnold Earley
- June 7 – Herb Score
- June 9 – Jesús Mora
- June 10 – Ed Palmquist
- June 14 – Jim Constable
- June 16 – Ken Johnson
- June 18 – Taylor Phillips
- June 23 – Dave Bristol
- June 26:
  - Joe Albanese
  - Gene Green
- June 29 – Bob Shaw
- June 30 – Dave Roberts

=== July ===
- July 1 – Frank Baumann
- July 8 – Al Spangler
- July 9 – Ray Rippelmeyer
- July 11 – Katherine Herring
- July 23 – Johnny James
- July 26 – Norm Siebern

=== August ===
- August 10 – Rocky Colavito
- August 13 – Bob Giggie
- August 17 – Jim Davenport
- August 19 – Walter Owens

=== September ===
- September 2:
  - Glenna Sue Kidd
  - Marv Throneberry
- September 11 – Bob Davis
- September 12 – Dave Stenhouse
- September 14 – Fred Green
- September 15 – John Fitzgerald
- September 17 – Chuck Daniel
- September 26 – Roy Wright
- September 27 – Jerry Casale

=== October ===
- October 9 – Joan Berger
- October 12 – Janet Wiley
- October 17 – Bob Powell
- October 19 – Ossie Álvarez
- October 21 – Johnny Goryl
- October 22 – Ron Jackson
- October 23:
  - Jake Striker
  - Lois Youngen
- October 24 – Bill Bell
- October 27 – Pumpsie Green

=== November ===
- November 4 – Tito Francona
- November 7 – Bob Hale
- November 9 – George Witt
- November 11 – Ken Walters
- November 16 – Minnie Mendoza
- November 17:
  - Dan Osinski
  - Orlando Peña
- November 18 – Curt Raydon
- November 25 – Jim Waugh
- November 26 – Minnie Rojas
- November 27 – Billy Moran

=== December ===
- December 4 – Dick Ricketts
- December 14 – Jerry Schoonmaker
- December 19 – Gordie Windhorn
- December 23 – Noella Leduc
- December 23 – Elder White
- December 31 – Ken Rowe

== Deaths ==
=== January ===
- January 2 – Kid Gleason, 66, best known as the betrayed manager of the infamous 1919 Chicago White Sox; who previously collected four 20-wins seasons as a pitcher from 1890 to 1893, with a career-high 38 victories in 1890, and later became a timely hitter and steady second baseman, hitting a .300 average four times, while helping the Baltimore Orioles win a pennant in 1895; later serving as a coach, then winning the American League pennant as a rookie manager for the White Sox in 1919, when his heart was broken by his eight players implicated in the 1919 World Series scandal.
- January 4 – Hal Deviney, 39, relief pitcher for the Boston Red Sox during the 1920 season.
- January 14 – Jesse Hoffmeister, 60, third baseman for the 1897 Pittsburgh Pirates.
- January 18 – Dan Marion, 43, pitcher who played with the Brooklyn Tip-Tops in the 1914 and 1915 seasons.
- January 19:
  - Con Starkel, 52, pitcher for the 1906 Washington Senators.
  - Harry Hinchman, 54, pitcher for the Cleveland Naps in the 1907 season.
- January 27 – Art Madison, 62, second baseman/shortstop who played for the Philadelphia Phillies in 1895 and the Pittsburgh Pirates in 1899.
- January 31 – Beany Jacobson, 51, pitcher for the Washington Senators, St. Louis Browns and Boston Americans in the 1900s decade.

=== February ===
- February 17 – Harry Smith, 59, British-born baseball player and manager, who caught from 1901 through 1909 for the Philadelphia Athletics, Pittsburgh Pirates and Boston Doves, also managing the Doves in 1909, and later in the minor leagues in a span of five seasons from 1913 to 1917.
- February 22 – Bill Shettsline, 69, manager for the Philadelphia Phillies during five seasons spanning 1898–1902, who later owned the team from 1905 to 1909.

=== March ===
- March 15 – Otis Stocksdale, 61, valuable utility who played all-positions except catcher for the Washington Senators, Boston Beaneaters and Baltimore Orioles from 1893 to 1896, while helping the Orioles win the National League pennant in 1896.
- March 16 – Jack Wieneke, 39, pitcher who played briefly for the Chicago White Sox during the 1921 season.
- March 20 – Dan Burke, 64, catcher/outfielder who played from 1890 to 1892 for the Rochester Broncos, Syracuse Stars and Boston Beaneaters.
- March 21 – Bob Black, 70, outfielder/pitcher who played for the Kansas City Cowboys of the Union Association in 1884.
- March 25 – Tom Donovan, 60, outfielder for the 1901 Cleveland Blues of the American League.
- March 28 – Tom McCarthy, 48, pitcher who played from 1908 to 1909 with the Cincinnati Reds, Pittsburgh Pirates and Boston Doves.
- March 29:
  - Harry Salisbury, 77, pitcher for the 1879 Troy Trojans of the National League and the 1882 Pittsburgh Alleghenys of the American Association, who finished in the top ten in eighteen categories during the 1882 season, including wins (20), strikeouts (135), earned run average (2.63), complete games (32), and innings pitched (335).
  - Ed Watkins, 55, outfielder for the 1902 Philadelphia Phillies.

=== April ===
- April 2 – Joe Cross, 75, right fielder who played briefly for the Louisville Colonels during the 1888 season.
- April 13 – Ody Abbott, 44, outfielder for the 1910 St. Louis Cardinals.
- April 17 – Thomas Griffin, 76, first baseman for the Milwaukee Brewers of the Union Association in 1884.
- April 19 – Joseph A. Roxburgh, 76, catcher for the 1884 Baltimore Orioles and the 1887 Philadelphia Athletics.
- April 23 – Tim Keefe, 76, Hall of Fame pitcher who posted a 342–225 record and a 2.63 ERA in 600 games, including six 30-win campaigns for the New York Metropolitans/Giants teams from 1883 to 1888, with 40-win seasons in 1883 and 1886, while leading the National League in ERA three times and strikeouts twice, with career strikeout mark (2500+) being record until 1908, also winning 19 straight in 1888, leading the Giants to their first pennant while going 4–0 with 0.51 ERA in the championship series.
- April 26 – Roy Graham, 38, backup catcher who played from 1922 to 1923 for the Chicago White Sox.

=== May ===
- May 1 – Bobby Mitchell, 77, National League pitcher who played for the Cincinnati Reds, Cleveland Blues and St. Louis Brown Stockings in parts of four seasons spanning 1877–1882.
- May 3 – Lefty James, 43, pitcher who played from 1912 through 1914 for the Cleveland Naps of the American League.
- May 5 – Steve Dunn, 74, Canadian first baseman who played for the 1884 St. Paul Saints of the Union Association.
- May 17 – Bill Van Dyke, 69, outfielder who played with the Toledo Maumees, St. Louis Browns and Boston Beaneaters in a span of three years from 1890 to 1893.
- May 19 – Wes Curry, 73, American Association umpire for six seasons between 1885 and 1898, who previously pitched two games for the Richmond Virginians in the 1884 season.
- May 20 – Billy Lauder, 59, third baseman who played four seasons between 1898 and 1903 for the Philadelphia Phillies, Philadelphia Athletics and New York Giants, and later coached for the Chicago White Sox.
- May 21 – Charlie Osterhout76, outfielder/catcher for the 1879 Syracuse Stars.of the National League.
- May 22 – Bunny Pearce, 48, backup catcher for the Cincinnati Reds from 1908 to 1909.
- May 24 – Phonney Martin, 87, player/manager for the 1872 Brooklyn Eckfords of the National Association, who also played for the 1872 Troy Trojans and the 1873 New York Mutuals.
- May 30 – Burley Bayer, 59, shortstop for the 1889 Louisville Colonels of the American Association.

=== June ===
- June 3 – Jack O'Brien, 60, outfielder for four clubs between 1899 and 2003, who became the first player to pinch-hit in World Series history, as a member of the 1903 Boston Americans.
- June 5 – Sam LaRocque, 70, Canadian second baseman for the Detroit Wolverines, Pittsburgh Alleghenys/Pirates and Louisville Colonels in parts of three seasons spanning 1888–1891.
- June 13 – Gat Stires, 83, outfielder who played from 1868 to 1871 for the Rockford Forest Citys of the National Association.

=== July ===
- July 2 – Tommy Dowd, 64, center fielder for seven clubs in two different leagues between 1891 and 1901, mainly for the St. Louis Browns of the National League, who posted a career average of .271 with 368 stolen bases and also managed the Browns from 1896 to 1897.
- July 7 – Neal Finn, 29, second baseman who played for the Brooklyn Robins/Dodgers and the Philadelphia Phillies from 1930 through 193s; played his last MLB game on June 17, twenty days before his death.
- July 12 – Joseph Herr, 68, National League infielder/outfielder during three seasons from 1887 to 1890 for the Cleveland Blues and the St. Louis Browns.
- July 23 – Rip Williams, 51, versatile utility who played in four seasons for the Boston Red Sox, Washington Senators and Cleveland Indians between 1911 and 1918.
- July 30 – Frank Allen, 44, National League pitcher who played from 1912 to 1917 for the Brooklyn Dodgers/Robins, Pittsburgh Rebels and Boston Braves.

=== August ===
- August 7 – Bill Irwin, 73, pitcher for the 1886 Cincinnati Red Stockings of the American Association.
- August 10 – George Mangus, 43, outfielder who played for the 1912 Philadelphia Phillies.
- August 13 – Elliot Bigelow, 35, outfielder for the Boston Red Sox in the 1929 season.

=== September ===
- September 3 – Ed Cartwright, 73, first baseman for the St. Louis Browns in 1890 and the Washington Senators from 1894 to 1897, who collected seven runs batted in in one inning of an American Association game in 1890, setting a major league record that would stand for 109 years until it was broken by St. Louis Cardinals' Fernando Tatís, who belted two grand slams in one inning during a 1999 game to drive in eight runs.
- September 13:
  - Bill Brennan, 52, umpire who worked during seven seasons in the National League (1909–1913, 1921) and the Federal League (1914–1915), including the 1911 World Series, and also spent many years of umpiring in the minor leagues with the American Association and the Southern Association.
  - Joe Harrington, 63, infielder for the Boston Beaneaters from 1895 to 1896, who in 1895 became the first major league ballplayer ever to hit a home run in his first at bat.
- September 16 – George Gore, 76, center fielder who played 14 seasons in three leagues from 1879 to 1892, who batted a career .301 average, won the 1880 National League batting title and appeared in four World Series, while leading the league in walks three times and runs twice, and setting a single-game record with seven stolen bases.
- September 22 – George Fields, 80, third baseman who played briefly for the Middletown Mansfields of the National Association during the 1872 season.
- September 24 – Mike Donlin, 36, outfielder for six teams between 1899 and 1912; a superb hitter during the deadball era who topped the .300 mark in 10 of his 12 major league seasons, hitting .356 and leading the National League with 124 runs in 1905, then guiding the New York Giants with six hits in their 1905 World Series victory over the Philadelphia Athletics, while retiring with a .333 career average in 1050 games.
- September 25 – Ring Lardner, 48, sports columnist and short story writer for several newspapers since 1907, mainly for the Chicago Tribune, who pioneered the satirical cynic's view of sports reporting in the early 1920s.

=== October ===
- October 5 – William Veeck, Sr., 55, sports writer and baseball executive, who was president of the Chicago Cubs from 1919 until the time of his death, whose leadership led the Cubs win three National League pennants in the 1918, 1929 and 1932 seasons.
- October 10 – Joe Kostal, 57, pitcher who played briefly for the 1896 Louisville Colonels.
- October 13 – Al Mannassau, 67, minor league outfielder/manager during six seasons from 1890 to 1895, who later served as an umpire in the National League (1899), American League (1901), and the Federal League (1914).
- October 20 – Lou Gertenrich, 58. outfielder who played with the Milwaukee Brewers and the Pittsburgh Pirates in a span of two seasons from 1901 to 1903.
- October 22:
  - Philip DeCatesby Ball, 70, owner of the St. Louis Terriers of the "outlaw" Federal League from 1914 to 1915, and the St. Louis Browns of the American League from 1916 until his death.
  - Bobby Clack, 83, English outfielder the Brooklyn Atlantics and the Cincinnati Reds from 1874 through 1876, who also served as an umpire during five games in 1876.
- October 31 – Charlie Loudenslager, 52, second baseman who played in one game for the 1904 Brooklyn Superbas of the National League.

=== November ===
- November 1 – Ed Scott, 63, pitcher from 1900 to 1901 for the Cincinnati Reds and Cleveland Blues.
- November 2 – Lou Phelan, 69, manager for the 1895 St. Louis Browns of the National League.
- November 5 – Frank Freund, 58, backup catcher for the 1896 Louisville Colonels.
- November 18 – Charles Strick, 75, catcher/second baseman/centerfielder who played for the 1882 Louisville Eclipse of the American Association.
- November 29 – John Humphries, 72, Canadian catcher/outfielder/first baseman who played from 1883 through 1885 for the New York Gothams of the National League and the Washington Nationals of the American Association.

=== December ===
- December 7 – Fred Hoey, 68, manager for the 1899 New York Giants of the National League.
- December 11 – Harry Croft, 58, National League OF/IF utility man who played in 1899 with the Louisville Colonels and the Philadelphia Phillies, before joining the Chicago Orphans in 1901.
- December 17 – Charlie DeArmond, 56, third baseman for the 1903 Cincinnati Reds.
- December 18 – Fred Robinson, 77, second baseman for the 1884 Cincinnati Outlaw Reds of the Union Association.
- December 21 – Louie Heilbroner, 72, manager for the St. Louis Cardinals during the 1902 season.
- December 22:
  - Nin Alexander, 75, catcher who played in 1884 for the Kansas City Unions of the Union Association and the St. Louis Browns of the American Association.
  - Joe Flynn, 71, outfielder who played in 1884 for the Philadelphia Keystones and Boston Reds of the Union Association.
- December 27 – Fritz Buelow, 57, fine defensive catcher during nine seasons from 1899 to 1907 for the St. Louis Perfectos/Cardinals, Detroit Tigers, Cleveland Naps and St. Louis Browns, who is regarded as the first ballplayer born in Berlin, Germany, to appear in a major league game.
- December 31 – James Donnelly, 66, third baseman for the 1884 Kansas City Cowboys of the Union Association.
