= 1933 Cincinnati Reds season =

1933 Cincinnati Reds
- League: National League
- Ballpark: Redland Field
- City: Cincinnati
- Owners: Sidney Weil
- General managers: Larry MacPhail
- Managers: Donie Bush
- Radio: WFBE (Harry Hartman, Sidney Ten-Eyck); WKRC (C.O. "Oatmeal" Brown); WSAI

In the 1933 American baseball season, the Cincinnati Reds finished eighth and last in the National League with a record of 58–94, 33 games behind the New York Giants.

== Offseason ==
The Reds hired Larry MacPhail as chief executive and general manager during the off-season. MacPhail had previously purchased an interest in the Columbus Red Birds, a minor league affiliate of the St. Louis Cardinals before being hired by the Reds after being recommended for the position by Cardinals general manager Branch Rickey.

Following two consecutive last place finishes with a combined record of 177-285, the Reds replaced manager Dan Howley. The club hired Donie Bush as his replacement for the 1933 season. Bush had previous managerial experience, as in 1923, he was a player/manager with the Washington Senators, leading the club to a 75-78 record and a fourth-place finish in the American League. Bush was the manager of the Pittsburgh Pirates from 1927 to 1929, leading them to the National League pennant in 1927 with a 94-60 record. Bush also managed the Chicago White Sox from 1930 to 1931.

On November 30, the Reds traded away outfielder Babe Herman to the Chicago Cubs, getting pitcher Bob Smith, catcher Rollie Hemsley, outfielder Johnny Moore and outfielder Lance Richbourg. Smith had a 4-3 record with a 4.61 ERA in 34 games with the Cubs in 1932. Hemsley split the 1932 season between the Cubs and the Pittsburgh Pirates, batting .289 with three home runs and 32 RBI in 76 games split between the two clubs. Moore had a .305 batting average with 13 home runs and 64 RBI in 119 games, and Richbourg hit .257 with a home run and 21 RBI in 44 games.

On December 17, Cincinnati and the St. Louis Cardinals made a trade, in which the Reds traded pitcher Ownie Carroll and outfielder Estel Crabtree in exchange for first baseman Jim Bottomley. Bottomley hit .296 with 11 home runs and 48 RBI in 91 games with the Cardinals during the 1932 season. During his career with St. Louis, Bottomley hit .325 with 181 home runs and 1105 RBI in 1392 games since the 1922 season. Bottomley won the National League Most Valuable Player award in 1928 when he hit .325 with a league leading 31 home runs and 136 RBI and 20 triples in 149 games. In 1925, Bottomley led the NL with 227 hits and 44 doubles, while in 1925, he again led the NL in doubles with 40, and in runs batted in with 120.

The Reds sold pitcher Al Eckert and outfielder Lance Richbourg to the St. Louis Cardinals on January 3, then on January 23, the Reds sold infielder Wally Gilbert to the Cardinals.

On February 4, the Reds purchased outfielder Harry Rice and pitcher Dutch Henry from the Minneapolis Millers of the American Association. In 1932, Rice hit .345 with 11 home runs with the Millers. He previously played in the American League, with his last season with the Washington Senators in 1931. Rice's best season in the AL was in 1925, as he finished fifth in American League Most Valuable Player voting after hitting .359 with 11 home runs and 47 RBI in 103 games with the St. Louis Browns. Henry appeared in only 10 games with the Millers in 1932, going 2-4. In 1931 with Minneapolis, Henry had a 23-10 record with a 4.41 ERA in 50 games. Henry last played in the American League with the Chicago White Sox in 1930, struggling to a 2-17 record with a 4.88 ERA in 35 games. His best season was in 1927, as Henry posted a record of 11-6 with a 4.23 ERA with the New York Giants.

== Regular season ==
The rebuilding Reds got off to a mediocre start to the season, going 8-8 in their first 16 games to sit in a tie for third place, 4.5 games behind the pennant leading Pittsburgh Pirates. On May 6, the Reds signed 48 year old free agent pitcher Jack Quinn. Quinn, who began his major league career with the New York Highlanders in 1909, had pitched with the Brooklyn Dodgers in 1932, going 3-7 with a 3.30 ERA in 42 games.

The Reds made a trade on May 7, trading shortstop Leo Durocher and pitchers Dutch Henry and Jack Ogden to the St. Louis Cardinals for infielder Sparky Adams and pitchers Paul Derringer and Allyn Stout. At the time of the trade, Adams was hitting .167 in eight games with the Cardinals. In 1931, Adams led the National League with 46 doubles. Derringer was 0-2 with a 4.24 ERA in three games with St. Louis in 1933. In 1931, Derringer was 18-8 with a league best .692 winning percentage with the Cardinals. Stout had appeared in one game with St. Louis, pitching a scoreless two innings. In 1931, Stout went 6-0 with a 4.21 ERA in 30 games.

Cincinnati continued to hover around the .500 mark through the middle of June, as after a 6-5 win over the St. Louis Cardinals in the second game of a doubleheader on June 18, the Reds had a record of 28-29, sitting in fifth place and 7 games behind the pennant leading New York Giants. The team then went 6-18 in their next 24 games, falling to 34-47 and into last place in the NL on July 11. Cincinnati released struggling infielder Andy High on this date, then two days later, the team released pitcher Jack Quinn.

As the season went on, the losses continued to pile on, as the Reds finished in last place for the third consecutive season with a record of 58-94, 33 games behind the pennant winning New York Giants and two games behind the seventh place Philadelphia Phillies. The Reds attendance dropped by nearly 150,000 fans from the 1932 season, as Cincinnati drew 218,281 fans, their lowest total since the 1918 season.

Outfielder Chick Hafey led the team with a .303 batting average, while hitting seven home runs and 62 RBI in 144 games. Hafey led Cincinnati with 172 hits. First baseman Jim Bottomley hit .250 with a team high 13 home runs and 83 RBI in 145 games, his first season with the club. Catcher Ernie Lombardi hit .283 with four home runs and 47 RBI in 107 games.

Paul Derringer, who was acquired early in the season in a trade with the St. Louis Cardinals, had a record of 7-25 with a team best 3.23 ERA and 85 strikeouts in 33 games. Derringer, who lost two games with St. Louis, led the National League with 27 losses in 1933. Red Lucas went 10-16 with a 3.40 ERA while throwing a team high 21 complete games, while Larry Benton tied Lucas for the team lead in wins, as he was 10-11 with a 3.71 ERA in 34 games. Eppa Rixey had a record of 6-3 with a 3.15 ERA in 16 games as a 42 year old.

=== Season standings ===
National League
Team	W	L	Pct.	GB	Home	Road
New York Giants	91	61	.599	—	48‍–‍27	43‍–‍34
Pittsburgh Pirates	87	67	.565	5	50‍–‍27	37‍–‍40
Chicago Cubs	86	68	.558	6	56‍–‍23	30‍–‍45
Boston Braves	83	71	.539	9	45‍–‍31	38‍–‍40
St. Louis Cardinals	82	71	.536	9½	47‍–‍30	35‍–‍41
Brooklyn Dodgers	65	88	.425	26½	36‍–‍41	29‍–‍47
Philadelphia Phillies	60	92	.395	31	32‍–‍40	28‍–‍52
Cincinnati Reds	58	94	.382	33	37‍–‍42	21‍–‍52

=== Record vs. opponents ===
1933 National League record Sources:
Team	BSN	BRO	CHC	CIN	NYG	PHI	PIT	STL
Boston	—	13–9–1	7–15	12–10	12–10–1	11–11	13–9	15–7
Brooklyn	9–13–1	—	9–13	10–12–1	8–14–2	13–9	7–15	9–12
Chicago	15–7	13–9	—	11–11	9–13	15–7	12–10	11–11
Cincinnati	10–12	12–10–1	11–11	—	4–17	7–14	7–15	7–15
New York	10–12–1	14–8–2	13–9	17–4	—	15–6	13–9	9–13–1
Philadelphia	11–11	9–13	7–15	14–7	6–15	—	7–15	6–16
Pittsburgh	9–13	15–7	10–12	15–7	9–13	15–7	—	14–8
St. Louis	7–15	12–9	11–11	15–7	13–9–1	16–6	8–14	—

=== Notable transactions ===
- July 31, 1933: Bob Smith was selected off waivers from the Reds by the Boston Braves.

=== Roster ===
1933 Cincinnati Reds
Roster
Pitchers: 19 Larry Benton; 21 Paul Derringer; 16 Benny Frey; 14 Si Johnson; 15 Ray Kolp; 12 Red Lucas; 29 Jack Quinn; 18 Eppa Rixey; 27 Bob Smith; 11 Allyn Stout	Catchers: 6 Jack Crouch; 6 Rollie Hemsley; 7 Ernie Lombardi; 24 Clyde Manion; Infielders: 10 Sparky Adams; 31 Otto Bluege; 3 Jim Bottomley; 10 Leo Durocher; 1 George Grantham; 23 Andy High; -- Eddie Hunter; 2 Jo-Jo Morrissey; 27 Tony Robello	Outfielders: 4 Chick Hafey; 5 Johnny Moore; 9 Harry Rice; 8 Wally Roettger; Other batters: 11 Taylor Douthit	Manager: 35 Donie Bush; Coaches: 34 Jewel Ens

== Player stats ==
=== Batting ===
==== Starters by position ====
Note: Pos = Position; G = Games played; AB = At bats; H = Hits; Avg. = Batting average; HR = Home runs; RBI = Runs batted in

Pos	Player	G	AB	H	Avg.	HR	RBI
C	Ernie Lombardi	107	350	99	.283	4	47
1B	Jim Bottomley	145	549	137	.250	13	83
2B	Jo-Jo Morrissey	148	534	123	.230	0	26
SS	Otto Bluege	108	291	62	.213	0	18
3B	Sparky Adams	137	538	141	.262	1	22
OF	Harry Rice	143	510	133	.261	0	54
OF	Chick Hafey	144	568	172	.303	7	62
OF	Johnny Moore	135	514	135	.263	1	44

==== Other batters ====
Note: G = Games played; AB = At bats; H = Hits; Avg. = Batting average; HR = Home runs; RBI = Runs batted in

Player	G	AB	H	Avg.	HR	RBI
George Grantham	87	260	53	.204	4	28
Wally Roettger	84	209	50	.239	1	17
Rollie Hemsley	49	116	22	.190	0	7
Clyde Manion	36	84	14	.167	0	3
Leo Durocher	16	51	11	.216	1	3
Andy High	24	43	9	.209	1	6
Tony Robello	14	30	7	.233	0	3
Jack Crouch	10	16	2	.125	0	1
Eddie Hunter	1	0	0	----	0	0
Taylor Douthit	1	0	0	----	0	0

=== Pitching ===
==== Starting pitchers ====
Note: G = Games pitched; IP = Innings pitched; W = Wins; L = Losses; ERA = Earned run average; SO = Strikeouts

Player	G	IP	W	L	ERA	SO
Paul Derringer	33	231.0	7	25	3.23	86
Red Lucas	29	219.2	10	16	3.40	40
Si Johnson	34	211.1	7	18	3.49	51
Eppa Rixey	16	94.1	6	3	3.15	10

==== Other pitchers ====
Note: G = Games pitched; IP = Innings pitched; W = Wins; L = Losses; ERA = Earned run average; SO = Strikeouts

Player	G	IP	W	L	ERA	SO
Larry Benton	34	152.2	10	11	3.71	33
Ray Kolp	30	150.1	6	9	3.53	28
Benny Frey	37	132.0	6	4	3.82	12
Bob Smith	16	73.2	4	4	2.20	18
Allyn Stout	23	71.1	2	3	3.79	29

==== Relief pitchers ====
Note: G = Games pitched; W = Wins; L = Losses; SV = Saves; ERA = Earned run average; SO = Strikeouts

Player	G	W	L	SV	ERA	SO
Jack Quinn	14	0	1	1	4.02	3

== Farm system ==
Level	Team	League	Manager
A	Topeka Senators	Western League	Art Ewoldt
B	Rock Island Islanders	Mississippi Valley League	Riley Parker
