= 1933 St. Louis Cardinals season =

Major League Baseball season

1933 St. Louis Cardinals
- League: National League
- Ballpark: Sportsman's Park
- City: St. Louis, Missouri
- Record: 82–71 (.536)
- League place: 5th
- Owners: Sam Breadon
- General managers: Branch Rickey
- Managers: Gabby Street, Frankie Frisch
- Radio: KMOX (France Laux); KWK (Thomas Patrick, John Harrington, Bob Thomas)

The 1933 St. Louis Cardinals season was the team's 52nd season in St. Louis, Missouri and its 42nd season in the National League. The Cardinals went 82–71 during the season and finished fifth in the National League.

== Offseason ==
- October 25, 1932: Rogers Hornsby was signed as a free agent by the Cardinals.

== Regular season ==
=== Season standings ===
National League
Team	W	L	Pct.	GB	Home	Road
New York Giants	91	61	.599	—	48‍–‍27	43‍–‍34
Pittsburgh Pirates	87	67	.565	5	50‍–‍27	37‍–‍40
Chicago Cubs	86	68	.558	6	56‍–‍23	30‍–‍45
Boston Braves	83	71	.539	9	45‍–‍31	38‍–‍40
St. Louis Cardinals	82	71	.536	9½	47‍–‍30	35‍–‍41
Brooklyn Dodgers	65	88	.425	26½	36‍–‍41	29‍–‍47
Philadelphia Phillies	60	92	.395	31	32‍–‍40	28‍–‍52
Cincinnati Reds	58	94	.382	33	37‍–‍42	21‍–‍52

=== Record vs. opponents ===
1933 National League record Sources:
Team	BSN	BRO	CHC	CIN	NYG	PHI	PIT	STL
Boston	—	13–9–1	7–15	12–10	12–10–1	11–11	13–9	15–7
Brooklyn	9–13–1	—	9–13	10–12–1	8–14–2	13–9	7–15	9–12
Chicago	15–7	13–9	—	11–11	9–13	15–7	12–10	11–11
Cincinnati	10–12	12–10–1	11–11	—	4–17	7–14	7–15	7–15
New York	10–12–1	14–8–2	13–9	17–4	—	15–6	13–9	9–13–1
Philadelphia	11–11	9–13	7–15	14–7	6–15	—	7–15	6–16
Pittsburgh	9–13	15–7	10–12	15–7	9–13	15–7	—	14–8
St. Louis	7–15	12–9	11–11	15–7	13–9–1	16–6	8–14	—

=== Notable transactions ===
- July 26, 1933: Rogers Hornsby was released by the Cardinals.

=== Roster ===
1933 St. Louis Cardinals
Roster
Pitchers: 15 Tex Carleton; 17 Dizzy Dean; 20 Paul Derringer; 20 Burleigh Grimes; 19 Walter Purcey; 16 Jesse Haines; 22 Bill Hallahan; 30 Syl Johnson; 20 Jim Lindsey; 21 Jim Mooney; 21 Allyn Stout; 18 Dazzy Vance; 10 Bill Walker	Catchers: 31 Bill Lewis; 8 Bob O'Farrell; 31 Joe Sprinz; 9 Jimmie Wilson; Infielders: 1 Sparky Adams; 12 Ripper Collins; 11 Pat Crawford; 2 Leo Durocher; 3 Frankie Frisch; 4 Rogers Hornsby; 28 Pepper Martin; 14 Gordon Slade; 14 Burgess Whitehead; 33 Charlie Wilson	Outfielders: 24 Ethan Allen; 27 Estel Crabtree; 7 Joe Medwick; 21 Gene Moore; 6 Ernie Orsatti; 29 Ray Pepper; 38 George Watkins	Manager: 3 Frankie Frisch; 25 Gabby Street; Coaches: 26 Buzzy Wares

== Player stats ==
=== Batting ===
==== Starters by position ====
Note: Pos = Position; G = Games played; AB = At bats; H = Hits; Avg. = Batting average; HR = Home runs; RBI = Runs batted in

Pos	Player	G	AB	H	Avg.	HR	RBI
C	Jimmie Wilson	113	369	94	.255	1	45
1B	Ripper Collins	132	493	153	.310	10	68
2B	Frankie Frisch	147	585	177	.303	4	66
SS	Leo Durocher	123	395	102	.258	2	41
3B	Pepper Martin	145	599	189	.316	8	57
OF	Joe Medwick	148	595	182	.306	18	98
OF	George Watkins	138	525	146	.278	5	62
OF	Ernie Orsatti	120	436	130	.298	0	38

==== Other batters ====
Note: G = Games played; AB = At bats; H = Hits; Avg. = Batting average; HR = Home runs; RBI = Runs batted in

Player	G	AB	H	Avg.	HR	RBI
Ethan Allen	91	261	63	.241	0	36
Pat Crawford	91	224	60	.268	0	21
Bob O'Farrell	55	163	39	.239	2	20
Rogers Hornsby	46	83	27	.325	2	21
Gordon Slade	39	62	7	.113	0	3
Gene Moore	11	38	15	.395	0	8
Bill Lewis	15	35	14	.400	1	8
Estel Crabtree	23	34	9	.265	0	3
Sparky Adams	8	30	5	.167	0	0
Ray Pepper	3	9	2	.222	1	2
Burgess Whitehead	12	7	2	.286	0	1
Joe Sprinz	3	5	1	.200	0	0
Charlie Wilson	1	1	0	.000	0	0

=== Pitching ===
==== Starting pitchers ====
Note: G = Games pitched; IP = Innings pitched; W = Wins; L = Losses; ERA = Earned run average; SO = Strikeouts

Player	G	IP	W	L	ERA	SO
Dizzy Dean	48	293.0	20	18	3.04	199
Tex Carleton	44	277.0	17	11	3.38	147
Bill Hallahan	36	244.1	16	13	3.50	93

==== Other pitchers ====
Note: G = Games pitched; IP = Innings pitched; W = Wins; L = Losses; ERA = Earned run average; SO = Strikeouts

Player	G	IP	W	L	ERA	SO
Bill Walker	29	158.0	9	10	3.42	41
Jesse Haines	32	115.1	9	6	2.50	37
Dazzy Vance	28	99.0	6	2	3.55	67
Jim Mooney	21	77.1	2	5	3.72	14
Paul Derringer	3	17.0	1	2	4.24	3
Burleigh Grimes	4	13.2	0	1	5.27	4

==== Relief pitchers ====
Note: G = Games pitched; W = Wins; L = Losses; SV = Saves; ERA = Earned run average; SO = Strikeouts

Player	G	W	L	SV	ERA	SO
Syl Johnson	35	3	3	3	4.29	28
Jim Lindsey	1	0	0	0	4.50	1
Allyn Stout	1	0	0	0	0.00	1

== Farm system ==
Level	Team	League	Manager
AA	Columbus Red Birds	American Association	Ray Blades
AA	Rochester Red Wings	International League	Specs Toporcer
A	Elmira Red Wings	New York-Pennsylvania League	Bob Rice and Eddie Dyer
A	Houston Buffaloes	Texas League	Carey Selph
A	Springfield Cardinals	Western League	Joe Schultz Sr.
B	Springfield Senators	Mississippi Valley League	Clay Hopper
B	Greensboro Patriots	Piedmont League	Eddie Dyer and Bob Rice
D	Beatrice Blues	Nebraska State League	Sonny Brookhaus
D	Lincoln Links	Nebraska State League	Doc Bennett and John Hruska
D	Norfolk Elks	Nebraska State League	Joe McDermott
D	Sioux Falls Canaries	Nebraska State League	Rex Stucker

LEAGUE CHAMPIONS: Columbus, Greensboro, Beatrice
