= Ed Fallenstein =

American baseball player (1908-1971)

- Pitcher
- Born: December 22, 1908; Newark, New Jersey, U.S.
- Died: November 24, 1971 (aged 62); Orange, New Jersey, U.S.
- Batted: Right Threw: Right

MLB debut
- April 16, 1931, for the Philadelphia Phillies

Last MLB appearance
- July 23, 1933, for the Boston Braves

MLB statistics
- Win–loss record: 2–1
- Strikeouts: 20
- Earned run average: 5.52
- Stats at Baseball Reference

Teams
- Philadelphia Phillies (1931); Boston Braves (1933)

Edward Joseph "Ace" Fallenstein (December 22, 1908 – November 24, 1971) was an American Major League Baseball pitcher. He played two seasons with the Philadelphia Phillies (1931) and Boston Braves (1933).
