= 1933 New York Giants (MLB) season =

1933 New York Giants
- World Series champions National League champions
- League: National League
- Ballpark: Polo Grounds
- City: New York City
- Record: 91–61 (.599)
- League place: 1st
- Owners: Charles Stoneham
- Managers: Bill Terry

The 1933 New York Giants season was the franchise's 51st season. The team won the National League pennant and defeated the American League pennant winner Washington Senators in the World Series in five games.

== Offseason ==
- December 29, 1932: Shanty Hogan was purchased from the Giants by the Boston Braves.

== Regular season ==
=== Season standings ===
National League
| Team | W | L | Pct. | GB | Home | Road |
|---|---|---|---|---|---|---|
| New York Giants | 91 | 61 | .599 | — | 48‍–‍27 | 43‍–‍34 |
| Pittsburgh Pirates | 87 | 67 | .565 | 5 | 50‍–‍27 | 37‍–‍40 |
| Chicago Cubs | 86 | 68 | .558 | 6 | 56‍–‍23 | 30‍–‍45 |
| Boston Braves | 83 | 71 | .539 | 9 | 45‍–‍31 | 38‍–‍40 |
| St. Louis Cardinals | 82 | 71 | .536 | 9½ | 47‍–‍30 | 35‍–‍41 |
| Brooklyn Dodgers | 65 | 88 | .425 | 26½ | 36‍–‍41 | 29‍–‍47 |
| Philadelphia Phillies | 60 | 92 | .395 | 31 | 32‍–‍40 | 28‍–‍52 |
| Cincinnati Reds | 58 | 94 | .382 | 33 | 37‍–‍42 | 21‍–‍52 |

=== Record vs. opponents ===
1933 National League record Sources:
| Team | BSN | BRO | CHC | CIN | NYG | PHI | PIT | STL |
|---|---|---|---|---|---|---|---|---|
| Boston | — | 13–9–1 | 7–15 | 12–10 | 12–10–1 | 11–11 | 13–9 | 15–7 |
| Brooklyn | 9–13–1 | — | 9–13 | 10–12–1 | 8–14–2 | 13–9 | 7–15 | 9–12 |
| Chicago | 15–7 | 13–9 | — | 11–11 | 9–13 | 15–7 | 12–10 | 11–11 |
| Cincinnati | 10–12 | 12–10–1 | 11–11 | — | 4–17 | 7–14 | 7–15 | 7–15 |
| New York | 10–12–1 | 14–8–2 | 13–9 | 17–4 | — | 15–6 | 13–9 | 9–13–1 |
| Philadelphia | 11–11 | 9–13 | 7–15 | 14–7 | 6–15 | — | 7–15 | 6–16 |
| Pittsburgh | 9–13 | 15–7 | 10–12 | 15–7 | 9–13 | 15–7 | — | 14–8 |
| St. Louis | 7–15 | 12–9 | 11–11 | 15–7 | 13–9–1 | 16–6 | 8–14 | — |

=== Roster ===
1933 New York Giants
Roster
| Pitchers: 15 Hi Bell; 10 Watty Clark; 12 Freddie Fitzsimmons; 11 Carl Hubbell; 20 Dolf Luque; 18 Roy Parmelee; 25 Jack Salveson; 17 Hal Schumacher; 22 Bill Shores; 19 Glenn Spencer; 16 Ray Starr; 28 George Uhle | Catchers: 28 Harry Danning; 8 Gus Mancuso; 9 Paul Richards; Infielders: 6 Hughie Critz; 7 Chuck Dressen; 5 Travis Jackson; 24 Bernie James; 22 Sam Leslie; 27 Joe Malay; 23 Blondy Ryan; 3 Bill Terry; 7 Johnny Vergez | Outfielders: 2 Kiddo Davis; 27 Hank Leiber; 1 Jo-Jo Moore; 16 Lefty O'Doul; 4 Mel Ott; 26 Homer Peel; 14 Phil Weintraub | Manager: 3 Bill Terry; Coaches: 31 Tommy Clarke; -- Clarence Mitchell; 21 Al Smith; 32 Frank Snyder; -- Billy Southworth |

== Player stats ==
| = Indicates team leader |

| = Indicates league leader |

=== Batting ===
==== Starters by position ====
Note: Pos = Position; G = Games played; AB = At bats; H = Hits; Avg. = Batting average; HR = Home runs; RBI = Runs batted in

| Pos | Player | G | AB | H | Avg. | HR | RBI |
|---|---|---|---|---|---|---|---|
| C | Gus Mancuso | 144 | 481 | 127 | .264 | 6 | 56 |
| 1B | Bill Terry | 123 | 475 | 153 | .322 | 6 | 58 |
| 2B | Hughie Critz | 133 | 558 | 137 | .246 | 2 | 33 |
| SS | Blondy Ryan | 146 | 525 | 125 | .238 | 3 | 48 |
| 3B | Johnny Vergez | 123 | 458 | 124 | .271 | 16 | 72 |
| OF | Mel Ott | 152 | 580 | 164 | .283 | 23 | 103 |
| OF | Jo-Jo Moore | 132 | 524 | 153 | .292 | 0 | 42 |
| OF | Kiddo Davis | 126 | 434 | 112 | .258 | 7 | 37 |

==== Other batters ====
Note: G = Games played; AB = At bats; H = Hits; Avg. = Batting average; HR = Home runs; RBI = Runs batted in

| Player | G | AB | H | Avg. | HR | RBI |
|---|---|---|---|---|---|---|
| Lefty O'Doul | 78 | 229 | 70 | .306 | 9 | 35 |
| Homer Peel | 84 | 148 | 38 | .257 | 1 | 12 |
| Sam Leslie | 40 | 137 | 44 | .321 | 3 | 27 |
| Bernie James | 60 | 125 | 28 | .224 | 1 | 10 |
| Travis Jackson | 53 | 122 | 30 | .246 | 0 | 12 |
| Paul Richards | 92 | 87 | 17 | .195 | 0 | 10 |
| Chuck Dressen | 16 | 45 | 10 | .222 | 0 | 3 |
| Joe Malay | 8 | 24 | 3 | .125 | 0 | 2 |
| Phil Weintraub | 8 | 15 | 3 | .200 | 1 | 1 |
| Hank Leiber | 6 | 10 | 2 | .200 | 0 | 0 |
| Harry Danning | 3 | 2 | 0 | .000 | 0 | 0 |

=== Pitching ===
==== Starting pitchers ====
Note: G = Games pitched; IP = Innings pitched; W = Wins; L = Losses; ERA = Earned run average; SO = Strikeouts

| Player | G | IP | W | L | ERA | SO |
|---|---|---|---|---|---|---|
| Carl Hubbell | 45 | 308.2 | 23 | 12 | 1.66 | 156 |
| Hal Schumacher | 35 | 258.2 | 19 | 12 | 2.16 | 96 |
| Freddie Fitzsimmons | 36 | 251.2 | 16 | 11 | 2.90 | 65 |
| Roy Parmelee | 32 | 218.1 | 13 | 8 | 3.17 | 132 |

Note: Hubbell tied with Hi Bell with most team saves with 5.

==== Other pitchers ====
Note: G = Games pitched; IP = Innings pitched; W = Wins; L = Losses; ERA = Earned run average; SO = Strikeouts

| Player | G | IP | W | L | ERA | SO |
|---|---|---|---|---|---|---|
| Jack Salveson | 8 | 30.2 | 0 | 2 | 3.82 | 8 |
| George Uhle | 6 | 13.2 | 1 | 1 | 7.90 | 4 |
| Ray Starr | 6 | 13.1 | 0 | 1 | 5.40 | 2 |

==== Relief pitchers ====
Note: G = Games pitched; W = Wins; L = Losses; SV = Saves; ERA = Earned run average; SO = Strikeouts

| Player | G | W | L | SV | ERA | SO |
|---|---|---|---|---|---|---|
| Hi Bell | 38 | 6 | 5 | 5 | 2.05 | 24 |
| Dolf Luque | 35 | 8 | 2 | 4 | 2.69 | 23 |
| Glenn Spencer | 17 | 0 | 2 | 0 | 5.13 | 14 |
| Watty Clark | 16 | 3 | 4 | 0 | 4.70 | 11 |
| Bill Shores | 8 | 2 | 1 | 0 | 3.93 | 20 |

== World series ==
=== Game 1 ===
October 3, 1933, at the Polo Grounds in New York City

| Team | 1 | 2 | 3 | 4 | 5 | 6 | 7 | 8 | 9 | R | H | E |
|---|---|---|---|---|---|---|---|---|---|---|---|---|
| Washington (A) | 0 | 0 | 0 | 1 | 0 | 0 | 0 | 0 | 1 | 2 | 5 | 3 |
| New York (N) | 2 | 0 | 2 | 0 | 0 | 0 | 0 | 0 | x | 4 | 10 | 2 |
W: Carl Hubbell (1–0) L: Lefty Stewart (0–1)
HR: NYG – Mel Ott (1)

=== Game 2 ===
October 4, 1933, at the Polo Grounds in New York City

| Team | 1 | 2 | 3 | 4 | 5 | 6 | 7 | 8 | 9 | R | H | E |
|---|---|---|---|---|---|---|---|---|---|---|---|---|
| Washington (A) | 0 | 0 | 1 | 0 | 0 | 0 | 0 | 0 | 0 | 1 | 5 | 0 |
| New York (N) | 0 | 0 | 0 | 0 | 0 | 6 | 0 | 0 | x | 6 | 10 | 0 |
W: Hal Schumacher (1–0) L: Alvin Crowder (0–1)
HR: WAS – Goose Goslin (1)

=== Game 3 ===
October 5, 1933, at Griffith Stadium in Washington, D.C.

| Team | 1 | 2 | 3 | 4 | 5 | 6 | 7 | 8 | 9 | R | H | E |
|---|---|---|---|---|---|---|---|---|---|---|---|---|
| New York (N) | 0 | 0 | 0 | 0 | 0 | 0 | 0 | 0 | 0 | 0 | 5 | 0 |
| Washington (A) | 2 | 1 | 0 | 0 | 0 | 0 | 1 | 0 | x | 4 | 9 | 1 |
W: Earl Whitehill (1–0) L: Freddie Fitzsimmons (0–1) S: Hi Bell (1)

=== Game 4 ===
October 6, 1933, at Griffith Stadium in Washington, D.C.

| Team | 1 | 2 | 3 | 4 | 5 | 6 | 7 | 8 | 9 | 10 | 11 | R | H | E |
|---|---|---|---|---|---|---|---|---|---|---|---|---|---|---|
| New York (N) | 0 | 0 | 0 | 1 | 0 | 0 | 0 | 0 | 0 | 0 | 1 | 2 | 11 | 1 |
| Washington (A) | 0 | 0 | 0 | 0 | 0 | 0 | 1 | 0 | 0 | 0 | 0 | 1 | 8 | 0 |
W: Carl Hubbell (2–0) L: Monte Weaver (0–1)
HR: NYG – Bill Terry (1)

=== Game 5 ===
October 7, 1933, at Griffith Stadium in Washington, D.C.

| Team | 1 | 2 | 3 | 4 | 5 | 6 | 7 | 8 | 9 | 10 | R | H | E |
|---|---|---|---|---|---|---|---|---|---|---|---|---|---|
| New York (N) | 0 | 2 | 0 | 0 | 0 | 1 | 0 | 0 | 0 | 1 | 4 | 11 | 1 |
| Washington (A) | 0 | 0 | 0 | 0 | 0 | 3 | 0 | 0 | 0 | 0 | 3 | 10 | 0 |
W: Dolf Luque (2–0) L: Jack Russell (baseball) (0–1)
HR: NYG – Mel Ott (2) WAS – Fred Schulte (1)

== Awards and honors ==
- Carl Hubbell, Associated Press Athlete of the Year

== Farm system ==
| Level | Team | League | Manager |
|---|---|---|---|
| B | Attleboro/Lawrence/Woonsocket Weavers | New England League | Bill Hunnefield and Mark Devlin. |

Attleboro club moved to Lawrence, May 26, 1933, and then to Woonsocket, July 18
