= Frank Ragland =

American baseball player (1904–1959)

- Pitcher
- Born: May 26, 1904; Water Valley, Mississippi, U.S.
- Died: July 28, 1959 (aged 55); Paris, Mississippi, U.S.
- Batted: Right Threw: Right

MLB debut
- April 17, 1932, for the Washington Senators

Last MLB appearance
- September 24, 1933, for the Philadelphia Phillies

MLB statistics
- Win–loss record: 1–4
- Earned run average: 7.11
- Strikeouts: 15
- Stats at Baseball Reference

Teams
- Washington Senators (1932); Philadelphia Phillies (1933)

Frank Roland Ragland (May 26, 1904 – July 28, 1959) was an American professional baseball player.

He was a right-handed pitcher over parts of two seasons (1932–1933) with the Washington Senators and Philadelphia Phillies.

For his career, he compiled a 1–4 record, with a 7.11 earned run average, and 15 strikeouts in 76 innings pitched.

He was born in Water Valley, Mississippi and died in Paris, Mississippi at the age of 55.
