= Frank Pearce (1930s pitcher) =

American baseball player (1905–1950)

- Pitcher
- Born: August 31, 1905; Middletown, Kentucky, U.S.
- Died: September 3, 1950 (aged 45); Van Buren, New York, U.S.
- Batted: Right Threw: Right

MLB debut
- April 20, 1933, for the Philadelphia Phillies

Last MLB appearance
- May 15, 1935, for the Philadelphia Phillies

MLB statistics
- Win–loss record: 5–6
- Earned run average: 4.77
- Strikeouts: 29
- Stats at Baseball Reference

Teams
- Philadelphia Phillies (1933–1935)

Franklin Thomas Pearce (August 31, 1905 – September 3, 1950) was an American Major League Baseball pitcher. He played parts of three seasons, from 1933 until 1935, for the Philadelphia Phillies. Pearce was effective as a reliever in a game played at Wrigley Field on September 12, 1933. In an afternoon game he relieved Ed Holley in the eighth inning for Philadelphia. The Phillies lost, 2–0, but the two pitchers gave up only six hits combined. Pearce died of a self-inflicted gunshot wound in 1950.
