= Al Wright (second baseman) =

American baseball player (1912-1998)

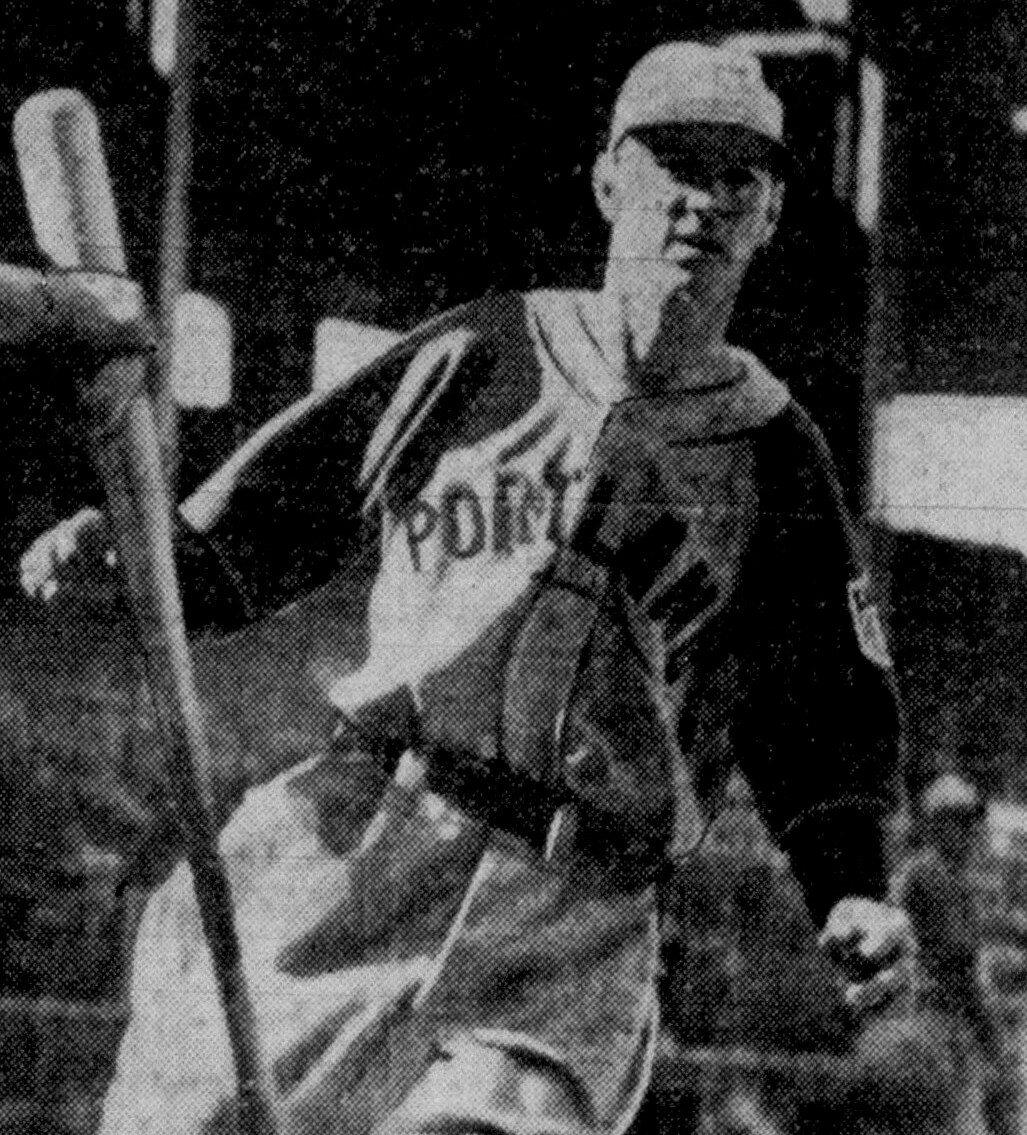
- Wright in 1942
- Second baseman
- Born: November 11, 1912; San Francisco, California, U.S.
- Died: November 12, 1998 (aged 86); Oakland, California, U.S.
- Batted: Right Threw: Right

MLB debut
- April 25, 1933, for the Boston Braves

Last MLB appearance
- May 5, 1933, for the Boston Braves

MLB statistics
- Batting average: 1.000
- At bats: 1
- Hits: 1
- Stats at Baseball Reference

Teams
- Boston Braves (1933)

Albert Edgar Wright (November 11, 1912 – November 13, 1998), nicknamed "A-1", was an American professional baseball player. He appeared in four games in Major League Baseball for the Boston Braves in the 1933 season, three as a second baseman and one as a pinch runner. He was born in San Francisco, California.

In his major league career, Wright was a 1.000 hitter (1-for-1). He also had an extensive minor league baseball career, playing in the Pacific Coast League from 1930 until 1944, retiring in 1946.

Wright died in Oakland, California, at the age of 86.
