= Eddie Hunter (baseball) =

American baseball player (1905–1967)

- Third baseman
- Born: February 6, 1905; Bellevue, Kentucky
- Died: March 14, 1967 (aged 62); Colerain, Ohio
- Batted: Right Threw: Right

MLB debut
- August 5, 1933, for the Cincinnati Reds

Last MLB appearance
- August 5, 1933, for the Cincinnati Reds

MLB statistics
- Games played: 1
- At bats: 0
- Stats at Baseball Reference

Teams
- Cincinnati Reds (1933)

Edison Franklin "Eddie" Hunter (February 6, 1905 – March 14, 1967) was a Major League Baseball third baseman who played with the Cincinnati Reds in 1933. He played one game, as a defensive replacement. He did not get an at bat.
