= 1933 Pittsburgh Pirates season =

1933 Pittsburgh Pirates
- League: National League
- Ballpark: Forbes Field
- City: Pittsburgh, Pennsylvania
- Owners: Bill Benswanger
- Managers: George Gibson

The 1933 Pittsburgh Pirates season was the 52nd season of the Pittsburgh Pirates franchise; the 47th in the National League. The Pirates finished second in the league standings with a record of 87–67.

== Regular season ==
=== Season standings ===
National League
Team	W	L	Pct.	GB	Home	Road
New York Giants	91	61	.599	—	48‍–‍27	43‍–‍34
Pittsburgh Pirates	87	67	.565	5	50‍–‍27	37‍–‍40
Chicago Cubs	86	68	.558	6	56‍–‍23	30‍–‍45
Boston Braves	83	71	.539	9	45‍–‍31	38‍–‍40
St. Louis Cardinals	82	71	.536	9½	47‍–‍30	35‍–‍41
Brooklyn Dodgers	65	88	.425	26½	36‍–‍41	29‍–‍47
Philadelphia Phillies	60	92	.395	31	32‍–‍40	28‍–‍52
Cincinnati Reds	58	94	.382	33	37‍–‍42	21‍–‍52

=== Record vs. opponents ===
1933 National League record Sources:
Team	BSN	BRO	CHC	CIN	NYG	PHI	PIT	STL
Boston	—	13–9–1	7–15	12–10	12–10–1	11–11	13–9	15–7
Brooklyn	9–13–1	—	9–13	10–12–1	8–14–2	13–9	7–15	9–12
Chicago	15–7	13–9	—	11–11	9–13	15–7	12–10	11–11
Cincinnati	10–12	12–10–1	11–11	—	4–17	7–14	7–15	7–15
New York	10–12–1	14–8–2	13–9	17–4	—	15–6	13–9	9–13–1
Philadelphia	11–11	9–13	7–15	14–7	6–15	—	7–15	6–16
Pittsburgh	9–13	15–7	10–12	15–7	9–13	15–7	—	14–8
St. Louis	7–15	12–9	11–11	15–7	13–9–1	16–6	8–14	—

=== Game log ===
1933 Game Log: 87–67 (Home: 50–27; Away: 37–40)
April: 10–3 (Home: 4–1; Away: 6–2)

#	Date	Opponent	Score	Win	Loss	Save	Attendance	Record
1	April 12	@ Reds	4–1	**Swift** (1–0)	Johnson	—	25,305	1–0
2	April 13	@ Reds	5–2	**French** (1–0)	Rixey	—	—	2–0
3	April 15	@ Cubs	6–4 (10)	**Harris** (1–0)	Grimes	—	—	3–0
4	April 18	@ Cubs	1–3	Warneke	**Swetonic** (0–1)	—	—	3–1
5	April 21	Reds	5–1	**Swift** (2–0)	Johnson	**Harris** (1)	—	4–1
6	April 22	Reds	6–5 (10)	**French** (2–0)	Smith	—	—	5–1
7	April 23	@ Cardinals	4–0	**Meine** (1–0)	Vance	—	—	6–1
8	April 23	@ Cardinals	6–2	**Hoyt** (1–0)	Walker	—	—	7–1
9	April 25	@ Cardinals	3–10	Hallahan	**Swetonic** (0–2)	—	—	7–2
10	April 27	Cubs	2–3	Bush	**Swift** (2–1)	—	—	7–3
11	April 28	Cardinals	2–0	**French** (3–0)	Mooney	—	—	8–3
12	April 29	Cardinals	6–4	**Meine** (2–0)	Walker	—	—	9–3
13	April 30	@ Reds	8–1	**Hoyt** (2–0)	Johnson	—	—	10–3

May: 14–12 (Home: 8–6; Away: 6–6)

#	Date	Opponent	Score	Win	Loss	Save	Attendance	Record
14	May 1	@ Phillies	10–0	**Swift** (3–1)	Collins	—	—	11–3
15	May 2	@ Phillies	5–6	Rhem	**French** (3–1)	—	—	11–4
16	May 4	@ Dodgers	2–1 (10)	**Meine** (3–0)	Clark	—	—	12–4
17	May 5	@ Dodgers	4–2	**Swift** (4–1)	Mungo	—	—	13–4
18	May 8	@ Braves	3–0	**French** (4–1)	Zachary	—	—	14–4
19	May 9	@ Braves	0–7	Frankhouse	**Hoyt** (2–1)	—	—	14–5
20	May 11	@ Giants	7–6	**Meine** (4–0)	Hubbell	**Harris** (2)	—	15–5
21	May 12	@ Giants	3–11	Schumacher	**Swift** (4–2)	—	—	15–6
22	May 13	@ Giants	1–2 (11)	Luque	**French** (4–2)	—	6,000	15–7
23	May 14	@ Giants	1–5	Parmelee	**Hoyt** (2–2)	—	—	15–8
24	May 15	Phillies	5–4	**Meine** (5–0)	Elliott	—	—	16–8
25	May 16	Phillies	8–4	**Swift** (5–2)	Moore	—	—	17–8
26	May 17	Phillies	6–4	**Smith** (1–0)	Collins	—	—	18–8
27	May 18	Phillies	6–2	**Swetonic** (1–2)	Rhem	—	—	19–8
28	May 19	Braves	3–5	Zachary	**Hoyt** (2–3)	Seibold	—	19–9
29	May 20	Braves	2–4	Cantwell	**Meine** (5–1)	—	—	19–10
30	May 20	Braves	7–6	**Harris** (2–0)	Betts	—	—	20–10
31	May 22	Dodgers	0–3	Clark	**French** (4–3)	—	—	20–11
32	May 23	Dodgers	3–0	**Swetonic** (2–2)	Carroll	—	—	21–11
33	May 24	Dodgers	6–5 (10)	**Chagnon** (1–0)	Mungo	—	2,000	22–11
34	May 26	Giants	5–6	Bell	**Harris** (2–1)	—	—	22–12
35	May 28	@ Reds	4–2	**French** (5–3)	Lucas	—	—	23–12
36	May 28	@ Reds	0–4	Rixey	**Swetonic** (2–3)	—	—	23–13
37	May 30	Cubs	2–1	**Swift** (6–2)	Grimes	—	—	24–13
38	May 30	Cubs	2–6	Malone	**Meine** (5–2)	—	—	24–14
39	May 31	Cubs	1–5	Root	**Swetonic** (2–4)	—	—	24–15

June: 12–18 (Home: 3–3; Away: 9–15)

#	Date	Opponent	Score	Win	Loss	Save	Attendance	Record
40	June 3	Reds	5–9	Benton	**Harris** (2–2)	—	—	24–16
41	June 3	Reds	4–5	Kolp	**Swift** (6–3)	Quinn	—	24–17
42	June 4	@ Cubs	9–3	**Swetonic** (3–4)	Grimes	**Harris** (3)	—	25–17
43	June 4	@ Cubs	2–9	Malone	**Meine** (5–3)	—	—	25–18
44	June 6	@ Cubs	3–5	Tinning	**Chagnon** (1–1)	Bush	—	25–19
45	June 7	@ Cubs	2–7	Bush	**Swift** (6–4)	—	—	25–20
46	June 8	Reds	2–8	Rixey	**French** (5–4)	—	—	25–21
47	June 9	Reds	2–0	**Swetonic** (4–4)	Derringer	—	—	26–21
48	June 10	Reds	4–3	**Swift** (7–4)	Kolp	—	—	27–21
49	June 11	@ Cardinals	11–7	**Kremer** (1–0)	Carleton	**Harris** (4)	—	28–21
50	June 11	@ Cardinals	3–0	**French** (6–4)	Walker	—	—	29–21
51	June 13	@ Cardinals	3–4	Dean	**Swetonic** (4–5)	—	—	29–22
52	June 14	@ Cardinals	2–3	Hallahan	**Meine** (5–4)	—	—	29–23
53	June 15	@ Cubs	0–5	Tinning	**Smith** (1–1)	—	—	29–24
54	June 16	@ Cubs	1–9	Bush	**Swift** (7–5)	—	26,000	29–25
55	June 17	Cubs	4–3	**Swetonic** (5–5)	Malone	—	—	30–25
56	June 18	@ Braves	5–3	**Meine** (6–4)	Brandt	—	—	31–25
57	June 18	@ Braves	4–3 (8)	**French** (7–4)	Betts	—	—	32–25
58	June 20	@ Braves	6–2	**Swift** (8–5)	Zachary	—	—	33–25
59	June 21	@ Braves	5–6	Cantwell	**Harris** (2–3)	Zachary	—	33–26
60	June 21	@ Braves	3–5	Mangum	**Swetonic** (5–6)	—	—	33–27
61	June 22	@ Dodgers	0–9	Benge	**Meine** (6–5)	—	4,000	33–28
62	June 23	@ Dodgers	4–5	Carroll	**French** (7–5)	Shaute	—	33–29
63	June 24	@ Dodgers	15–3	**Swift** (9–5)	Thurston	—	10,000	34–29
64	June 25	@ Dodgers	5–2	**Chagnon** (2–1)	Mungo	—	—	35–29
65	June 25	@ Dodgers	1–9	Beck	**Hoyt** (2–4)	—	25,000	35–30
66	June 28	@ Giants	5–2	**Swetonic** (6–6)	Hubbell	—	—	36–30
67	June 28	@ Giants	4–7 (10)	Uhle	**French** (7–6)	—	15,000	36–31
68	June 29	@ Phillies	4–6	Elliott	**Meine** (6–6)	Rhem	—	36–32
69	June 30	@ Phillies	4–5	Pickrel	**French** (7–7)	—	—	36–33

July: 20–10 (Home: 17–7; Away: 3–3)

#	Date	Opponent	Score	Win	Loss	Save	Attendance	Record
70	July 1	@ Phillies	8–13	Hansen	**Chagnon** (2–2)	—	—	36–34
71	July 1	@ Phillies	4–3	**Smith** (2–1)	Collins	—	—	37–34
72	July 4	Cardinals	1–5	Hallahan	**Swetonic** (6–7)	—	—	37–35
73	July 4	Cardinals	4–2	**French** (8–7)	Mooney	—	—	38–35
74	July 5	Cardinals	7–6	**Hoyt** (3–4)	Johnson	**French** (1)	7,000	39–35
75	July 8	Phillies	7–8	Liska	**Swetonic** (6–8)	Rhem	—	39–36
76	July 8	Phillies	3–0	**Smith** (3–1)	Jackson	—	—	40–36
77	July 10	Phillies	3–2	**French** (9–7)	Holley	—	—	41–36
78	July 11	Braves	3–5	Zachary	**Swetonic** (6–9)	—	—	41–37
79	July 12	Braves	9–8 (10)	**French** (10–7)	Betts	—	—	42–37
80	July 13	Braves	8–3	**Smith** (4–1)	Cantwell	—	—	43–37
81	July 14	Braves	3–4 (10)	Frankhouse	**French** (10–8)	—	—	43–38
82	July 17	Dodgers	14–2	**Swift** (10–5)	Carroll	—	7,500	44–38
83	July 17	Dodgers	7–0	**Swetonic** (7–9)	Benge	—	—	45–38
84	July 18	Dodgers	11–8	**Hoyt** (4–4)	Thurston	—	2,500	46–38
85	July 19	Giants	4–1	**French** (11–8)	Fitzsimmons	—	—	47–38
86	July 19	Giants	3–7	Hubbell	**Smith** (4–2)	—	20,000	47–39
87	July 20	Giants	6–5	**Meine** (7–6)	Luque	—	—	48–39
88	July 21	Giants	5–6	Clark	**Hoyt** (4–5)	—	3,000	48–40
89	July 22	Giants	0–1	Hubbell	**French** (11–9)	—	25,000	48–41
90	July 22	Giants	7–2	**Meine** (8–6)	Parmelee	—	27,000	49–41
91	July 23	@ Reds	1–6	Lucas	**Swift** (10–6)	—	—	49–42
92	July 23	@ Reds	4–6	Rixey	**Chagnon** (2–3)	Kolp	—	49–43
93	July 25	Cubs	4–3	**Swetonic** (8–9)	Bush	**Hoyt** (1)	8,000	50–43
94	July 25	Cubs	4–1	**Smith** (5–2)	Tinning	—	10,000	51–43
95	July 27	Cubs	2–0	**French** (12–9)	Root	—	—	52–43
96	July 29	Reds	9–8	**Harris** (3–3)	Benton	—	—	53–43
97	July 29	Reds	6–4	**Chagnon** (3–3)	Rixey	**Harris** (5)	—	54–43
98	July 30	@ Reds	5–4	**Chagnon** (4–3)	Derringer	—	—	55–43
99	July 30	@ Reds	8–6	**Harris** (4–3)	Benton	**Chagnon** (1)	—	56–43

August: 12–13 (Home: 4–3; Away: 8–10)

#	Date	Opponent	Score	Win	Loss	Save	Attendance	Record
100	August 1	Cardinals	9–3	**Swetonic** (9–9)	Walker	**Hoyt** (2)	—	57–43
101	August 2	Cardinals	3–4 (12)	Haines	**French** (12–10)	—	—	57–44
102	August 3	Cardinals	1–4 (6)	Dean	**Swift** (10–7)	—	—	57–45
103	August 4	Cardinals	5–4	**Meine** (9–6)	Walker	—	—	58–45
104	August 5	@ Cubs	6–2	**Smith** (6–2)	Warneke	—	—	59–45
105	August 6	@ Cubs	0–6	Malone	**Swetonic** (9–10)	—	—	59–46
106	August 11	Cubs	2–8	Bush	**French** (12–11)	—	—	59–47
107	August 12	Cubs	5–2	**Smith** (7–2)	Malone	—	—	60–47
108	August 12	Cubs	3–2	**Meine** (10–6)	Root	—	—	61–47
109	August 13	@ Cubs	2–3	Warneke	**Swift** (10–8)	—	—	61–48
110	August 16	@ Dodgers	1–2 (11)	Mungo	**French** (12–12)	—	14,000	61–49
111	August 16	@ Dodgers	11–7	**Swetonic** (10–10)	Carroll	**Smith** (1)	—	62–49
112	August 19	@ Braves	2–5	Brandt	**Meine** (10–7)	—	—	62–50
113	August 20	@ Braves	4–5 (11)	Smith	**Swetonic** (10–11)	—	—	62–51
114	August 20	@ Braves	1–8	Cantwell	**Swift** (10–9)	—	—	62–52
115	August 22	@ Braves	4–5 (14)	Frankhouse	**Hoyt** (4–6)	—	—	62–53
116	August 25	@ Giants	5–8 (11)	Luque	**Swetonic** (10–12)	—	—	62–54
117	August 25	@ Giants	2–6	Parmelee	**Meine** (10–8)	—	—	62–55
118	August 26	@ Giants	1–2	Hubbell	**Smith** (7–3)	—	—	62–56
119	August 26	@ Giants	7–2	**Birkofer** (1–0)	Clark	**Hoyt** (3)	45,000	63–56
120	August 28	@ Phillies	9–5	**Chagnon** (5–3)	Elliott	—	—	64–56
121	August 28	@ Phillies	9–1	**French** (13–12)	Holley	—	—	65–56
122	August 29	@ Phillies	4–1	**Meine** (11–8)	Hansen	—	—	66–56
123	August 30	@ Phillies	5–1	**Birkofer** (2–0)	Ragland	—	—	67–56
124	August 31	@ Phillies	13–11	**Swetonic** (11–12)	Rhem	**Hoyt** (4)	—	68–56

September: 17–11 (Home: 14–7; Away: 3–4)

#	Date	Opponent	Score	Win	Loss	Save	Attendance	Record
125	September 1	Cardinals	2–1 (11)	**French** (14–12)	Hallahan	—	—	69–56
126	September 2	Cardinals	4–1	**Meine** (12–8)	Walker	—	—	70–56
127	September 3	@ Reds	3–9	Lucas	**Birkofer** (2–1)	—	—	70–57
128	September 4	Reds	1–0	**Smith** (8–3)	Johnson	—	—	71–57
129	September 5	Giants	6–1	**French** (15–12)	Hubbell	—	5,000	72–57
130	September 6	Giants	6–5 (10)	**Swift** (11–9)	Bell	—	—	73–57
131	September 6	Giants	1–9	Schumacher	**Birkofer** (2–2)	—	20,000	73–58
132	September 7	Giants	14–2	**Meine** (13–8)	Parmelee	—	9,000	74–58
133	September 8	Giants	1–2	Hubbell	**Smith** (8–4)	—	—	74–59
134	September 9	Dodgers	6–2	**French** (16–12)	Benge	—	—	75–59
135	September 9	Dodgers	7–8	Carroll	**Chagnon** (5–4)	Ryan	9,000	75–60
136	September 10	@ Dodgers	2–1	**Swift** (12–9)	Beck	—	—	76–60
137	September 10	@ Dodgers	2–3	Mungo	**Harris** (4–4)	—	15,000	76–61
138	September 12	Dodgers	1–0	**Meine** (14–8)	Thurston	—	—	77–61
139	September 12	Dodgers	2–0	**Hoyt** (5–6)	Leonard	—	2,000	78–61
140	September 13	Braves	1–0	**French** (17–12)	Cantwell	—	—	79–61
141	September 15	Braves	1–10	Brandt	**Smith** (8–5)	—	—	79–62
142	September 16	Braves	4–6	Betts	**Swift** (12–10)	—	—	79–63
143	September 16	Braves	10–0	**Birkofer** (3–2)	Zachary	—	—	80–63
144	September 18	Phillies	2–1	**Meine** (15–8)	Ragland	—	—	81–63
145	September 18	Phillies	0–6	Holley	**Hoyt** (5–7)	—	—	81–64
146	September 19	Phillies	2–1	**French** (18–12)	Grabowski	—	—	82–64
147	September 19	Phillies	2–3	Collins	**Smith** (8–6)	—	—	82–65
148	September 20	Dodgers	3–0	**Swift** (13–10)	Beck	—	—	83–65
149	September 23	@ Cardinals	9–3	**Birkofer** (4–2)	Hallahan	—	—	84–65
150	September 24	@ Cardinals	4–5	Carleton	**French** (18–13)	—	—	84–66
151	September 24	@ Cardinals	5–4 (10)	**Chagnon** (6–4)	Dean	—	—	85–66
152	September 25	@ Cardinals	3–6	Walker	**Smith** (8–7)	—	—	85–67

October: 2–0 (Home: 0–0; Away: 2–0)

#	Date	Opponent	Score	Win	Loss	Save	Attendance	Record
153	October 1	@ Reds	7–5	**Swift** (14–10)	Lucas	—	—	86–67
154	October 1	@ Reds	6–5 (10)	**Swetonic** (12–12)	Kolp	—	—	87–67

Legend: = Win = Loss
Bold = Pirates team member

=== Roster ===
1933 Pittsburgh Pirates
**Roster**
**Pitchers**: 49 Ralph Birkofer; 46 Leon Chagnon; 50 Clise Dudley; 42 Larry French; 44 Bill Harris; 48 Waite Hoyt; -- Ray Kremer; 41 Heinie Meine; 47 Hal Smith; 43 Steve Swetonic; 45 Bill Swift	**Catchers**: 32 Hal Finney; 30 Earl Grace; 31 Tom Padden; 23 Val Picinich; **Infielders**: 15 Bill Brubaker; 22 Tony Piet; 24 Gus Suhr; 25 Tommy Thevenow; 20 Pie Traynor; 21 Arky Vaughan; 26 Pep Young	**Outfielders**: 14 Adam Comorosky; 16 Woody Jensen; 12 Freddie Lindstrom; 10 Lloyd Waner; 11 Paul Waner; **Other batters**: 40 Red Nonnenkamp	**Manager**: 33 George Gibson; **Coaches**: 34 Doc Crandall; 35 Grover Hartley; 36 Honus Wagner

== Player stats ==
=== Batting ===
==== Starters by position ====
Note: Pos = Position; G = Games played; AB = At bats; H = Hits; Avg. = Batting average; HR = Home runs; RBI = Runs batted in

Pos	Player	G	AB	H	Avg.	HR	RBI
C	Earl Grace	93	291	84	.289	3	44
1B	Gus Suhr	154	566	151	.267	10	75
2B	Tony Piet	107	362	117	.323	1	42
3B	Pie Traynor	154	624	190	.304	1	82
SS	Arky Vaughan	152	573	180	.314	9	97
LF	Lloyd Waner	121	500	138	.276	0	26
CF	Freddie Lindstrom	138	538	167	.310	5	55
RF	Paul Waner	154	618	191	.309	7	70

==== Other batters ====
Note: G = Games played; AB = At bats; H = Hits; Avg. = Batting average; HR = Home runs; RBI = Runs batted in

Player	G	AB	H	Avg.	HR	RBI
Tommy Thevenow	73	253	79	.312	0	34
Woody Jensen	70	196	58	.296	0	15
Adam Comorosky	64	162	46	.284	1	15
Hal Finney	56	133	31	.233	1	18
Tom Padden	30	90	19	.211	0	8
Val Picinich	16	52	13	.250	1	7
Pep Young	25	20	6	.300	0	0
Bill Brubaker	2	2	0	.000	0	0
Red Nonnenkamp	1	1	0	.000	0	0

=== Pitching ===
==== Starting pitchers ====
Note: G = Games pitched; IP = Innings pitched; W = Wins; L = Losses; ERA = Earned run average; SO = Strikeouts

Player	G	IP	W	L	ERA	SO
Larry French	47	291.1	18	13	2.72	88
Bill Swift	37	218.1	14	10	3.13	64
Heinie Meine	32	207.1	15	8	3.65	50
Ralph Birkofer	9	50.2	4	2	2.31	20

==== Other pitchers ====
Note: G = Games pitched; IP = Innings pitched; W = Wins; L = Losses; ERA = Earned run average; SO = Strikeouts

Player	G	IP	W	L	ERA	SO
Steve Swetonic	31	164.2	12	12	3.50	37
Hal Smith	28	145.0	8	7	2.86	40
Waite Hoyt	36	117.0	5	7	2.92	44

==== Relief pitchers ====
Note: G = Games pitched; W = Wins; L = Losses; SV = Saves; ERA = Earned run average; SO = Strikeouts

Player	G	W	L	SV	ERA	SO
Leon Chagnon	39	6	4	1	3.69	35
Bill Harris	31	4	4	5	3.22	19
Ray Kremer	7	1	0	0	10.35	4
Clise Dudley	1	0	0	0	135.00	0

== Awards and honors ==
1933 Major League Baseball All-Star Game

- Pie Traynor, reserve
- Paul Waner, reserve

=== League top five finishers ===
Tony Piet

- #3 in NL in batting average (.323)

Pie Traynor

- #4 in NL in hits (190)

Arky Vaughan

- #3 in NL in on-base percentage (.388)
- #5 in NL in RBI (97)
- #5 in NL in slugging percentage (.478)

Paul Waner

- #2 in NL in runs scored (101)
- #3 in NL in hits (191)

== Farm system ==
Level	Team	League	Manager
A	Tulsa Oilers	Texas League	Art Griggs
