= Bert Delmas =

American baseball player (1911-1979)

- Second baseman
- Born: May 20, 1911; San Francisco, California
- Died: December 4, 1979 (aged 68); Huntington Beach, California
- Batted: Left Threw: Right

MLB debut
- September 10, 1933, for the Brooklyn Dodgers

Last MLB appearance
- October 1, 1933, for the Brooklyn Dodgers

MLB statistics
- Batting average: .250
- Home runs: 0
- Runs batted in: 0
- Stats at Baseball Reference

Teams
- Brooklyn Dodgers (1933)

Albert Charles Delmas (May 20, 1911 in San Francisco, California – December 4, 1979 in Huntington Beach, California), is a former professional baseball player who played second base in the major leagues for the Brooklyn Dodgers. He attended Stanford University.

After his brief stint with the Dodgers, he played minor league ball with four teams in the International League in 1934 and 1935. Delmas died on December 4, 1979. He was interred at Pacific View Memorial Park.
