= 1933 Chicago Cubs season =

1933 Chicago Cubs
- League: National League
- Ballpark: Wrigley Field
- City: Chicago
- Record: 86–68 (.558)
- League place: 3rd
- Owners: Philip K. Wrigley
- Managers: Charlie Grimm
- Radio: WGN; WBBM (Pat Flanagan); WMAQ; WCFL; WIBO

The 1933 Chicago Cubs season was the 62nd season of the Chicago Cubs franchise, the 58th in the National League and the 18th at Wrigley Field. The Cubs finished third in the National League with a record of 86–68.

== Offseason ==
- November 30, 1932: Bob Smith, Rollie Hemsley, Johnny Moore and Lance Richbourg were traded by the Cubs to the Cincinnati Reds for Babe Herman.

== Regular season ==
=== Season standings ===
National League
Team	W	L	Pct.	GB	Home	Road
New York Giants	91	61	.599	—	48‍–‍27	43‍–‍34
Pittsburgh Pirates	87	67	.565	5	50‍–‍27	37‍–‍40
Chicago Cubs	86	68	.558	6	56‍–‍23	30‍–‍45
Boston Braves	83	71	.539	9	45‍–‍31	38‍–‍40
St. Louis Cardinals	82	71	.536	9½	47‍–‍30	35‍–‍41
Brooklyn Dodgers	65	88	.425	26½	36‍–‍41	29‍–‍47
Philadelphia Phillies	60	92	.395	31	32‍–‍40	28‍–‍52
Cincinnati Reds	58	94	.382	33	37‍–‍42	21‍–‍52

=== Record vs. opponents ===
1933 National League record Sources:
Team	BSN	BRO	CHC	CIN	NYG	PHI	PIT	STL
Boston	—	13–9–1	7–15	12–10	12–10–1	11–11	13–9	15–7
Brooklyn	9–13–1	—	9–13	10–12–1	8–14–2	13–9	7–15	9–12
Chicago	15–7	13–9	—	11–11	9–13	15–7	12–10	11–11
Cincinnati	10–12	12–10–1	11–11	—	4–17	7–14	7–15	7–15
New York	10–12–1	14–8–2	13–9	17–4	—	15–6	13–9	9–13–1
Philadelphia	11–11	9–13	7–15	14–7	6–15	—	7–15	6–16
Pittsburgh	9–13	15–7	10–12	15–7	9–13	15–7	—	14–8
St. Louis	7–15	12–9	11–11	15–7	13–9–1	16–6	8–14	—

=== Roster ===
1933 Chicago Cubs
Roster
Pitchers: 17 Guy Bush; 21 Burleigh Grimes; 34 Roy Henshaw; 21 Leroy Herrmann; 18 Pat Malone; 23 Lynn Nelson; 42 Beryl Richmond; 19 Charlie Root; 22 Bud Tinning; 16 Lon Warneke; 41 Carroll Yerkes	Catchers: 15 Gilly Campbell; 9 Gabby Hartnett; 61 Babe Phelps; 14 Zack Taylor; Infielders: 41 Dolph Camilli; 1 Woody English; 7 Charlie Grimm; 49 Stan Hack; 8 Harvey Hendrick; 2 Billy Herman; 11 Billy Jurges; 12 Mark Koenig	Outfielders: 3 Kiki Cuyler; 6 Frank Demaree; 31 Taylor Douthit; 4 Babe Herman; 31 Jim Mosolf; 5 Riggs Stephenson	Manager: 7 Charlie Grimm; Coaches: 51 Red Corriden; 42 Charley O'Leary; 56 Johnny Schulte

== Player stats ==
=== Batting ===
==== Starters by position ====
Note: Pos = Position; G = Games played; AB = At bats; H = Hits; Avg. = Batting average; HR = Home runs; RBI = Runs batted in

Pos	Player	G	AB	H	Avg.	HR	RBI
C	Gabby Hartnett	140	490	135	.276	16	88
1B	Charlie Grimm	107	384	95	.247	3	37
2B	Billy Herman	153	619	173	.279	0	44
SS	Billy Jurges	143	487	131	.269	5	50
3B	Woody English	105	398	104	.261	3	41
OF	Riggs Stephenson	97	346	114	.329	4	51
OF	Babe Herman	137	508	147	.289	16	93
OF	Frank Demaree	134	515	140	.272	6	51

==== Other batters ====
Note: G = Games played; AB = At bats; H = Hits; Avg. = Batting average; HR = Home runs; RBI = Runs batted in

Player	G	AB	H	Avg.	HR	RBI
Kiki Cuyler	70	262	83	.317	5	35
Mark Koenig	80	218	62	..284	3	25
Harvey Hendrick	69	189	55	.291	4	23
Gilly Campbell	46	89	25	.281	1	10
Jim Mosolf	31	82	22	.268	1	9
Taylor Douthit	27	71	16	.225	0	5
Stan Hack	20	60	21	.350	1	2
Dolph Camilli	16	58	13	.224	2	7
Zack Taylor	16	11	0	.000	0	0
Babe Phelps	3	7	2	.286	0	2

=== Pitching ===
==== Starting pitchers ====
Note: G = Games pitched; IP = Innings pitched; W = Wins; L = Losses; ERA = Earned run average; SO = Strikeouts

Player	G	IP	W	L	ERA	SO
Lon Warneke	36	287.1	18	13	2.00	133
Guy Bush	41	259.0	20	12	2.75	84
Charlie Root	35	242.1	15	10	2.60	86
Pat Malone	31	186.1	10	14	3.91	72

==== Other pitchers ====
Note: G = Games pitched; IP = Innings pitched; W = Wins; L = Losses; ERA = Earned run average; SO = Strikeouts

Player	G	IP	W	L	ERA	SO
Bud Tinning	32	175.1	13	6	3.18	59
Burleigh Grimes	17	69.2	3	6	3.49	12

==== Relief pitchers ====
Note: G = Games pitched; W = Wins; L = Losses; SV = Saves; ERA = Earned run average; SO = Strikeouts

Player	G	W	L	SV	ERA	SO
Lynn Nelson	24	5	5	1	3.21	20
Roy Henshaw	21	2	1	0	4.19	16
Leroy Herrmann	9	0	1	1	5.57	4
Beryl Richmond	4	0	0	0	1.93	2
Carroll Yerkes	1	0	0	0	4.50	0

== Farm system ==
Level	Team	League	Manager
AA	Los Angeles Angels	Pacific Coast League	Jack Lelivelt

LEAGUE CHAMPIONS: Los Angeles
