= Pep Young =

American baseball player (1907–1962)

- Second baseman
- Born: August 29, 1907; Jamestown, North Carolina, U.S.
- Died: January 14, 1962 (aged 54); Jamestown, North Carolina, U.S.
- Batted: Right Threw: Right

MLB debut
- April 25, 1933, for the Pittsburgh Pirates

Last MLB appearance
- September 30, 1945, for the St. Louis Cardinals

MLB statistics
- Batting average: .262
- Home runs: 32
- Runs batted in: 347
- Stats at Baseball Reference

Teams
- Pittsburgh Pirates (1933–1940); Cincinnati Reds (1941); St. Louis Cardinals (1941, 1945)

Lemuel Floyd Young (August 29, 1907 – January 14, 1962) was an American professional baseball player. He played all or part of ten years in Major League Baseball for the Pittsburgh Pirates (1933–40), Cincinnati Reds (1941) and St. Louis Cardinals (1941 and 1945), primarily as a second baseman.

The high point of his career was when he finished 14th in voting for the 1938 National League MVP for playing in 149 games and having 562 at bats, 58 runs, 156 hits, 36 doubles, 5 triples, 4 home runs, 79 RBI, 7 stolen bases, 40 walks, .278 batting average, .329 on-base percentage, .381 slugging percentage, 214 total bases and 5 sacrifice hits.

In 10 seasons he played in 730 games and had 2,466 at bats, 274 runs, 645 hits, 128 doubles, 34 triples, 32 home runs, 347 RBI, 18 stolen bases, 152 walks, .262 batting average, .308 on-base percentage, .380 slugging percentage, 937 total bases and 38 sacrifice hits.

He died in his hometown at the age of 54.
