= Harry McCurdy =

American baseball player (1899–1972)

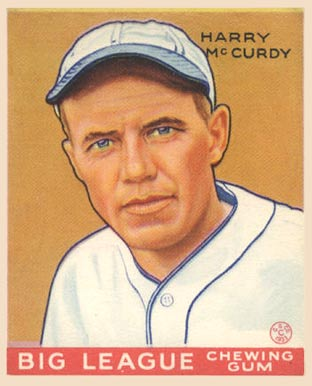
- Harry McCurdy 1933 Goudey baseball card
- Catcher
- Born: September 15, 1899; Stevens Point, Wisconsin, U.S.
- Died: July 21, 1972 (aged 72); Houston, Texas, U.S.
- Batted: Left Threw: Right

MLB debut
- July 1, 1922, for the St. Louis Cardinals

Last MLB appearance
- July 1, 1934, for the Cincinnati Reds

MLB statistics
- Batting average: .282
- Home runs: 9
- Runs batted in: 148
- Stats at Baseball Reference

Teams
- St. Louis Cardinals (1922–1923); Chicago White Sox (1926–1928); Philadelphia Phillies (1930–1933); Cincinnati Reds (1934)

Harry Henry McCurdy (September 15, 1899 – July 21, 1972), born in Stevens Point, Wisconsin, was a catcher for the St. Louis Cardinals (1922–1923), Chicago White Sox (1926–1928), Philadelphia Phillies (1930–1933) and Cincinnati Reds (1934).

In 10 seasons he played in 543 games and had 1,157 at bats, 148 runs, 326 hits, 71 doubles, 12 triples, 9 home runs, 148 RBI, 12 stolen bases, 129 walks, .282 batting average, .355 on-base percentage, .387 slugging percentage, 448 total bases and 25 sacrifice hits.

He died in Houston, Texas at the age of 72.
