= Charlie Butler (baseball) =

American baseball player (1906-1964)

- Pitcher
- Born: May 12, 1906; Green Cove Springs, Florida, U.S.
- Died: May 10, 1964 (aged 57); Brunswick, Georgia, U.S.
- Batted: Right Threw: Left

MLB debut
- May 1, 1933, for the Philadelphia Phillies

Last MLB appearance
- May 1, 1933, for the Philadelphia Phillies

MLB statistics
- Games: 1
- Innings pitched: 1.0
- Earned run average: 9.00
- Stats at Baseball Reference

Teams
- Philadelphia Phillies (1933)

Charles Thomas Butler (May 12, 1906 – May 10, 1964) was an American Major League Baseball pitcher. Butler played for the Philadelphia Phillies in 1933. In 1 career game, he had a 0–0 record with a 9.00 ERA. He batted right and threw left-handed.

Butler was born in Green Cove Springs, Florida, and died in Brunswick, Georgia, at the age of 57.
