= John Jackson (baseball) =

American baseball player (1909-1956)

- Pitcher
- Born: July 15, 1909; Philadelphia, Pennsylvania, U.S.
- Died: October 22, 1956 (aged 47); Somers Point, New Jersey, U.S.
- Batted: Right Threw: Right

MLB debut
- June 20, 1933, for the Philadelphia Phillies

Last MLB appearance
- August 2, 1933, for the Philadelphia Phillies

MLB statistics
- Win–loss record: 2–2
- Earned run average: 6.00
- Strikeouts: 11
- Stats at Baseball Reference

Teams
- Philadelphia Phillies (1933)

John Lewis Jackson (July 15, 1909 – October 22, 1956) was an American pitcher in Major League Baseball. He played for the Philadelphia Phillies in 1933.
