= Jack Berly =

American baseball player (1903–1977)

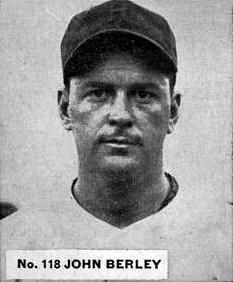
- Pitcher
- Born: May 24, 1903; Natchitoches, Louisiana, U.S.
- Died: June 26, 1977 (aged 74); Houston, Texas, U.S.
- Batted: Right Threw: Right

MLB debut
- April 22, 1924, for the St. Louis Cardinals

Last MLB appearance
- September 24, 1933, for the Philadelphia Phillies

MLB statistics
- Win–loss record: 10–13
- Earned run average: 5.02
- Strikeouts: 66
- Stats at Baseball Reference

Teams
- St. Louis Cardinals (1924); New York Giants (1931); Philadelphia Phillies (1932–1933)

John Chambers Berly, Sr. (May 24, 1903 – June 26, 1977) was an American Major League Baseball pitcher.

Berly was born in Natchitoches, Louisiana. He made his Major league debut for the St. Louis Cardinals on April 22, 1924. Making four appearances, all in late-inning relief, he gave up five runs over eight innings pitched. Berly would not return to the Majors for seven seasons.

In 1928, Berly joined the Rochester Red Wings of the Triple-A International League, then managed by Billy Southworth. The Red Wings won three straight IL pennants from 1928–1930, and Berly went 33–22 in those seasons, winning the IL earned run average title in 1930 (2.49).

In 1931, the New York Giants acquired Berly. He had seven wins with eight losses in 27 games. In 1932–1933 he pitched for the Philadelphia Phillies, mostly in relief.

Berly returned to Rochester in 1934, beginning a period of eight years' service in the International League with the Red Wings, Baltimore Orioles and Toronto Maple Leafs. He returned to Rochester in late 1940, just in time to play on his fourth IL pennant winner. His IL career ended in 1941. Over 11 IL seasons, he had a win-loss record of 101–84, with a 3.68 ERA in 1,610 innings pitched.

Berly was inducted into the International League Hall of Fame in 1955. In 1977, he died in Houston, Texas.
