= Dutch Holland =

American baseball player (1903–1967)

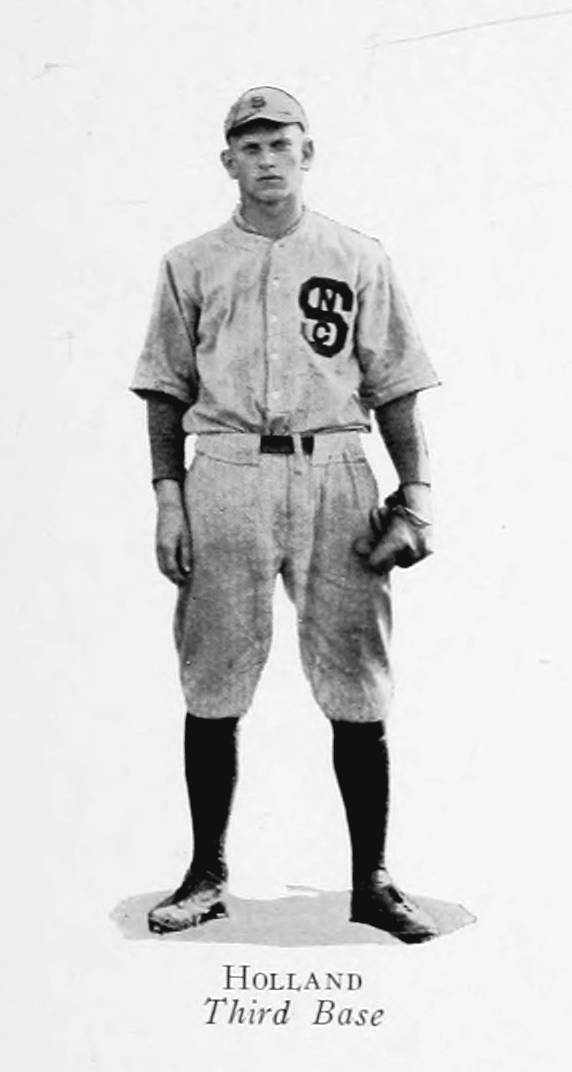
- Holland in the North Carolina State University "Agromeck" yearbook in 1923
- Outfielder
- Born: October 1, 1894; Middlesex, North Carolina, U.S.
- Died: July 5, 1974 (aged 79); Lumberton, North Carolina, U.S.
- Batted: Right Threw: Right

MLB debut
- August 16, 1932, for the Boston Braves

Last MLB appearance
- August 10, 1934, for the Cleveland Indians

MLB statistics
- Batting average: .273
- Home runs: 3
- Runs batted in: 34
- Stats at Baseball Reference

Teams
- Boston Braves (1932–1933); Cleveland Indians (1934)

Robert Clyde "Dutch" Holland (October 12, 1903 – June 16, 1967) was an American outfielder in Major League Baseball. He played for the Boston Braves from 1932 to 1933 and the Cleveland Indians in 1934.

Holland attended North Carolina State College, where he played college baseball for the Wolfpack from 1923 to 1925.

In 102 MLB games over three seasons (1932–1934), Holland posted a .273 batting average (86-for-315) with 37 runs, 3 home runs, and 34 runs batted in. He had a .969 career fielding percentage playing at left and right field.
