= Joe Mowry =

American baseball player (1908-1994)

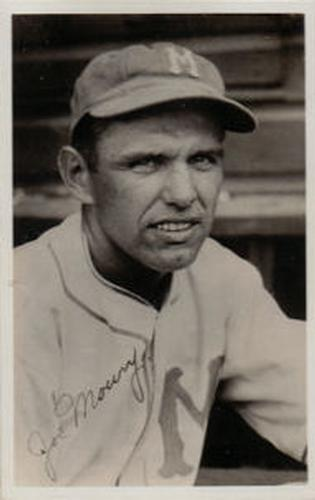
- Mowry with the Minneapolis Millers in 1932
- Outfielder
- Born: April 6, 1908; St. Louis, Missouri
- Died: February 9, 1994 (aged 85); St. Louis, Missouri
- Batted: Both Threw: Right

MLB debut
- May 13, 1933, for the Boston Braves

Last MLB appearance
- September 29, 1935, for the Boston Braves

MLB statistics
- Batting average: .233
- Home runs: 2
- Runs batted in: 37
- Stats at Baseball Reference

Teams
- Boston Braves (1933–1935)

Joseph Aloysius Mowry (April 6, 1908 – February 9, 1994) was an American outfielder in Major League Baseball. He played for the Boston Braves.
