= Ray Starr =

American baseball player (1906–1963)

- Pitcher
- Born: April 23, 1906; Nowata, Oklahoma, U.S.
- Died: February 9, 1963 (aged 56); Baylis, Illinois, U.S.
- Batted: Right Threw: Right

MLB debut
- September 11, 1932, for the St. Louis Cardinals

Last MLB appearance
- September 26, 1945, for the Chicago Cubs

MLB statistics
- Win–loss record: 37–35
- Earned run average: 3.53
- Strikeouts: 189
- Stats at Baseball Reference

Teams
- St. Louis Cardinals (1932); New York Giants (1933); Boston Braves (1933); Cincinnati Reds (1941–1943); Pittsburgh Pirates (1944–1945); Chicago Cubs (1945)

Career highlights and awards
- All-Star (1942)

Raymond Francis Starr (April 23, 1906 – February 9, 1963) was an American professional baseball player who played pitcher in the Major Leagues from 1932 to 1945. Starr was named to the All-Star team in 1942. He would play for the New York Giants, St. Louis Cardinals, Boston Braves, Cincinnati Reds, Pittsburgh Pirates, and Chicago Cubs.

Although born in Nowata, Oklahoma, Starr lived most of his life in Centralia, Illinois. After baseball he opened "Ray Starr's Home Plate", a local eatery. He died in 1963, aged 56, of an apparent heart attack in Baylis, Illinois.
