= Joe Hutcheson =

American baseball player (1905–1993)

- Outfielder
- Born: February 5, 1905; Springtown, Texas, U.S.
- Died: February 23, 1993 (aged 88); Tyler, Texas, U.S.
- Batted: Left Threw: Right

MLB debut
- July 8, 1933, for the Brooklyn Dodgers

Last MLB appearance
- October 1, 1933, for the Brooklyn Dodgers

MLB statistics
- Batting average: .234
- Home runs: 6
- Runs batted in: 21
- Stats at Baseball Reference

Teams
- Brooklyn Dodgers (1933)

Joseph Johnson Hutcheson (February 5, 1905 – February 23, 1993) was an American professional baseball player who played outfield for the 1933 Brooklyn Dodgers. He attended the University of North Texas.
