= Ramón López (baseball) =

Cuban baseball player (1933–1982)

- Pitcher
- Born: May 26, 1933; Las Villas, Cuba
- Died: September 4, 1982 (aged 49); Miami, Florida, U.S.
- Batted: Right Threw: Right

MLB debut
- August 21, 1966, for the California Angels

Last MLB appearance
- September 22, 1966, for the California Angels

MLB statistics
- Win–loss record: 0–1
- Earned run average: 5.14
- Strikeouts: 2
- Stats at Baseball Reference

Teams
- California Angels (1966)

José Ramón López Hevia (May 26, 1933 – September 4, 1982) was a Cuban professional baseball player who played one season for the California Angels of Major League Baseball.

López also played in Mexico in the Mexican League and the Mexican Pacific League. In 1966, he established the Mexican League record for strikeouts in a single season, recording 309 strikeouts while playing for the Sultanes de Monterrey. The record is still unbroken as of 2024.
