= Fritz Knothe =

American baseball player (1903-1963)

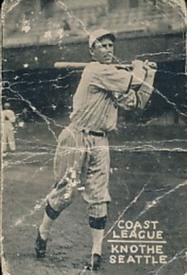
- Third baseman / Shortstop
- Born: May 1, 1903; Passaic, New Jersey, U.S.
- Died: March 27, 1963 (aged 59); Passaic, New Jersey, U.S.
- Batted: Right Threw: Right

MLB debut
- April 12, 1932, for the Boston Braves

Last MLB appearance
- August 30, 1933, for the Philadelphia Phillies

MLB statistics
- Batting average: .220
- Home runs: 2
- Runs batted in: 53
- Stats at Baseball Reference

Teams
- Boston Braves (1932–1933); Philadelphia Phillies (1933)

Wilfred Edgar Knothe (May 1, 1903 – March 27, 1963) was an American Major League Baseball player. He played two seasons with the Boston Braves (1932–1933) and Philadelphia Phillies (1933). Before being a professional baseball player, Knothe would briefly play professional basketball within the original American Basketball League.
