= Cy Moore =

American baseball player (1905-1972)

- Pitcher
- Born: February 7, 1905; Elberton, Georgia, U.S.
- Died: March 28, 1972 (aged 67); Augusta, Georgia, U.S.
- Batted: Right Threw: Right

MLB debut
- June 7, 1929, for the Brooklyn Robins

Last MLB appearance
- September 24, 1934, for the Philadelphia Phillies

MLB statistics
- Win–loss record: 16–26
- Earned run average: 4.86
- Strikeouts: 181
- Stats at Baseball Reference

Teams
- Brooklyn Robins/Dodgers (1929–1932); Philadelphia Phillies (1933–1934)

William Austin Moore (February 7, 1905 – March 28, 1972) was an American pitcher in Major League Baseball. He pitched from 1929 to 1934 in the National League.

In October 1933, Moore hit and killed a pedestrian with his car in Henrico County, Virginia. Moore was charged criminally but ultimately acquitted.
