= Jack Warner (third baseman) =

American baseball player (1903–1986)

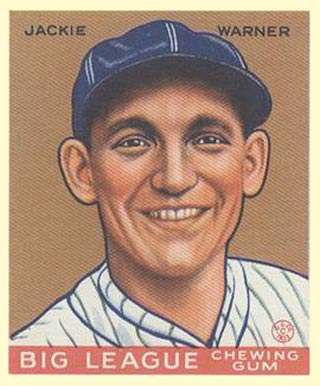
- Third baseman
- Born: August 29, 1903; Evansville, Indiana, U.S.
- Died: March 13, 1986 (aged 82); Mt. Vernon, Illinois, U.S.
- Batted: Right Threw: Right

MLB debut
- September 24, 1925, for the Detroit Tigers

Last MLB appearance
- September 30, 1933, for the Philadelphia Phillies

MLB statistics
- Batting average: .250
- Home runs: 1
- Runs batted in: 120
- Stats at Baseball Reference

Teams
- Detroit Tigers (1925–1928); Brooklyn Robins (1929–1931); Philadelphia Phillies (1933)

John Ralph Warner (August 29, 1903 – March 13, 1986) was an American baseball infielder. He played professional baseball player from 1921 to 1946, including eight seasons in Major League Baseball with the Detroit Tigers (1925–1928), Brooklyn Robins (1929–1931), and Philadelphia Phillies (1932).

== Early years ==
Warner was born in Evansville, Indiana, in 1903.

== Professional baseball ==
=== Minor leagues ===
Warner began playing professional baseball in 1921 for Waynesboro in the Blue Ridge League. From 1923 to 1925, he played for the Vernon Tigers in the Pacific Coast League. He compiled a .303 batting average in 159 games for Vernon in 1924 and .296 in 166 games in 1925.

=== Detroit Tigers ===
Warner made his major league debut with the Detroit Tigers at age 22 on September 24, 1925. He became the Tigers' regular third baseman for the 1926 and 1927 seasons. His best year was 1927, when he appeared in 138 games at third base and finished among the American League leaders in at bats (559), outs (431), and hit by pitch (6). In the 1927 season, he also scored 78 runs and had 149 hits, including 32 extra base hits, 45 RBIs, and 14 stolen bases. Warner did not hit for high average (.250 career batting average), but he was adept at drawing walks and had on-base percentages of .381, .342, and .330 in his first three major league seasons.

=== Brooklyn and Philadelphia ===
Warner spent most of the 1929 season with Toledo, compiling a .330 batting average in 145 games. He joined the Brooklyn Robins late in the 1929 season. In three seasons with the Robins, Warner became a utility infielder, playing in 47 games in three years. He finished his career with the Phillies in 1933, where he played in 107 games, mostly at second base, but saw his batting average drop to .224. Warner played his final major league game on September 30, 1933.

Over his eight-year major league career, Warner appeared in 478 major games, including 334 games at third base, 71 at second base and 30 at shortstop. He had 949 assists, 582 putouts, 482 total bases, 387 hits, 199 runs, 120 RBIs, 73 extra base hits, and one home run.

== Later years ==
Warner was married to Wave (Bruce) Warner in approximately 1925. They lived in Mt. Vernon, Illinois, by the time of the 1930 U. S. Census.

After his playing career, Warner was a scout for the Chicago Cubs and managed and coached in their farm system. He spent 12 seasons as a coach for the Los Angeles Angels of the Pacific Coast League, a longtime Cub farm team, and also scouted for other MLB organizations. Warner died in Mt. Vernon, Illinois, at age 82 in 1986.
