= Allyn Stout =

American baseball player (1904–1974)

- Pitcher
- Born: October 31, 1904; Peoria, Illinois, U.S.
- Died: December 22, 1974 (aged 70); Sikeston, Missouri, U.S.
- Batted: Right Threw: Right

MLB debut
- May 16, 1931, for the St. Louis Cardinals

Last MLB appearance
- June 27, 1943, for the Boston Braves

MLB statistics
- Win–loss record: 20–20
- Earned run average: 4.54
- Strikeouts: 185
- Stats at Baseball Reference

Teams
- St. Louis Cardinals (1931–1933); Cincinnati Reds (1933–1934); New York Giants (1935); Boston Braves (1943)

Allyn McClelland Stout (October 31, 1904 – December 22, 1974) was a pitcher in Major League Baseball. He played for the St. Louis Cardinals, Cincinnati Reds, New York Giants, and Boston Braves. On May 7, 1933, he was involved in the trade that brought future Hall of Famer Leo Durocher to the St. Louis Cardinals.
