= Estel Crabtree =

American baseball player (1903–1967)

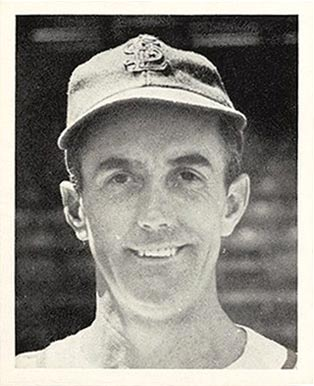
- Outfielder
- Born: August 19, 1903; Scioto County, Ohio, U.S.
- Died: January 4, 1967 (aged 63); Logan, Ohio, U.S.
- Batted: Left Threw: Right

MLB debut
- April 18, 1929, for the Cincinnati Reds

Last MLB appearance
- October 1, 1944, for the Cincinnati Reds

MLB statistics
- Batting average: .281
- Home runs: 13
- Runs batted in: 142
- Stats at Baseball Reference

Teams
- Cincinnati Reds (1929, 1931–1932); St. Louis Cardinals (1933, 1941–1942); Cincinnati Reds (1943–1944)

Estel Crayton Crabtree (August 19, 1903 – January 4, 1967) was an American Major League Baseball outfielder for the Cincinnati Reds (1929; 1931–1932; 1943–1944) and the St. Louis Cardinals (1933; 1941–1942). His playing career was unusual in that he went eight years between major league appearances. He was a native of Crabtree, Ohio, a populated place within Scioto County.

Crabtree made his major league debut on April 18, 1929, as a pinch-hitter in a 3–1 loss to the Cardinals at Crosley Field. Though his most regular playing time came in 1931 and 1932, his best season was 1941, when he returned to the big leagues at age 37. He finished 32nd in voting for National League MVP for playing in 77 games and having 167 at bats, 27 runs, 57 hits, 6 doubles, 3 triples, 5 home runs, 28 RBI, 1 stolen base, 26 walks, .341 batting average, .439 on-base percentage, .503 slugging percentage, 84 total bases and 2 sacrifice hits.

In 1931, he finished seventh in the league with 12 triples, and from 1941 to 1944 finished in the league's top ten in the oldest-player category.

In eight seasons, he played in 489 games, had 1,408 at bats, 174 runs, 396 hits, 53 doubles, 25 triples, 13 home runs, 142 RBI, 8 stolen bases, 113 walks, .281 batting average, .339 on-base percentage, .382 slugging percentage, 538 total bases and 23 sacrifice hits. Often used as a pinch-hitter during his career, he was an average defensive outfielder for his era, handling 813 out of 833 total chances for a .976 fielding percentage.

Crabtree lived in Nelsonville, Ohio, for many years. Crabtree, better known as "Crabby", was one of the most highly regarded sports personalities ever to have lived in Nelsonville. In addition to being a former major leaguer who played for the St. Louis Cardinals and Cincinnati Reds, he was a player-coach for Rochester Red Wings, and was posthumously inducted into the Red Wings Hall of Fame in 1989. He retired in 1944 and returned to Nelsonville. "Crabby" helped organize Little League baseball for youngsters in the Nelsonville area. He was also active in the Nelsonville Band Boosters and served as their president, and was the founder of the annual "Old-Timers Baseball Day" held each year during the Parade of the Hills, an annual festival held each year in Nelsonville. Crabtree Field, a baseball field in Nelsonville, is dedicated to him.

Crabtree died in nearby Logan, Ohio at Hocking Valley Hospital at the age of 63 after a brief illness and is buried in Greenlawn Cemetery in Nelsonville.
