= Ed Holley =

American baseball player (1899–1986)

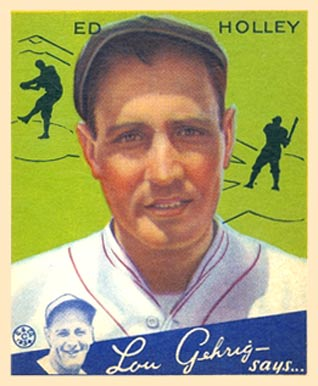
- Holley 1934 Goudey baseball card
- Pitcher
- Born: July 23, 1899; Benton, Kentucky, U.S.
- Died: October 26, 1986 (aged 87); Paducah, Kentucky, U.S.
- Batted: Right Threw: Right

MLB debut
- May 24, 1928, for the Chicago Cubs

Last MLB appearance
- August 8, 1934, for the Pittsburgh Pirates

MLB statistics
- Win–loss record: 25–40
- Earned run average: 4.40
- Strikeouts: 169
- Stats at Baseball Reference

Teams
- Chicago Cubs (1928); Philadelphia Phillies (1932–1934); Pittsburgh Pirates (1934)

Edward Edgar Holley (July 23, 1899 – October 26, 1986) was an American professional baseball pitcher. He played four seasons in Major League Baseball with the Chicago Cubs in 1928 and the Philadelphia Phillies and Pittsburgh Pirates 1932–34, in the National League. Holley pitched with a sidearm delivery.
