= Leroy Herrmann =

American baseball player (1906–1972)

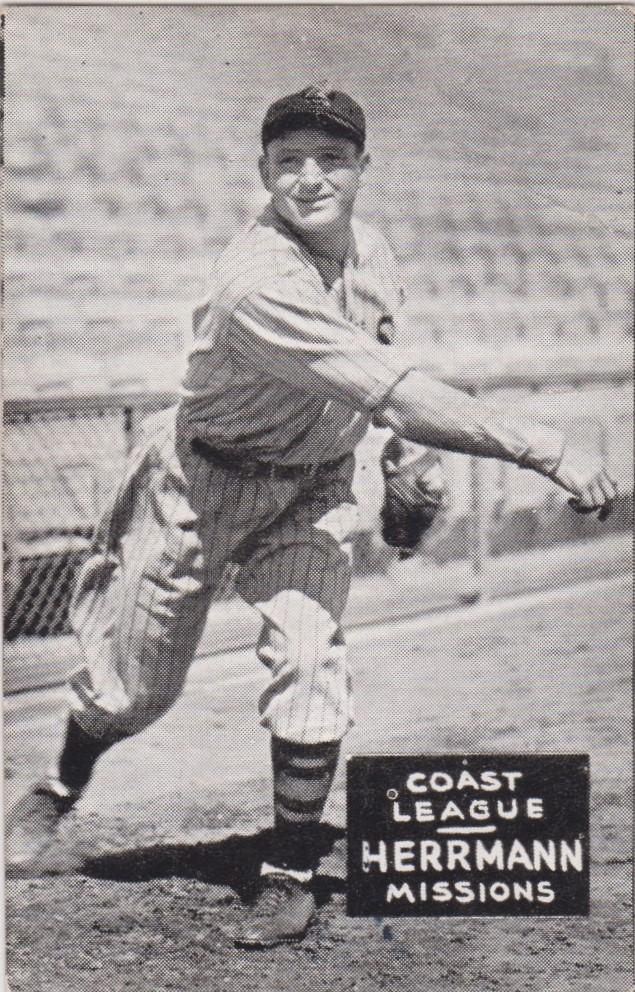
- Pitcher
- Born: February 27, 1906; Steward, Illinois
- Died: July 3, 1972 (aged 66); Livermore, California
- Batted: Right Threw: Right

MLB debut
- July 30, 1932, for the Chicago Cubs

Last MLB appearance
- September 17, 1935, for the Cincinnati Reds

MLB statistics
- Win–loss record: 5–7
- Earned run average: 4.13
- Strikeouts: 39
- Stats at Baseball Reference

Teams
- Chicago Cubs (1932–1933); Cincinnati Reds (1935)

Leroy George Herrmann (February 27, 1906 – July 3, 1972), was an American professional baseball pitcher. He played in Major League Baseball for the Chicago Cubs and Cincinnati Reds between 1932 and 1935.
