= Gordon Slade =

American baseball player (1904–1974)

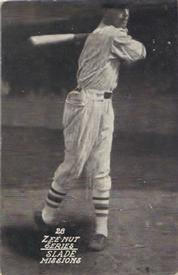
- Shortstop
- Born: October 9, 1904; Salt Lake City, Utah, U.S.
- Died: January 2, 1974 (aged 69); Long Beach, California, U.S.
- Batted: Right Threw: Right

MLB debut
- April 21, 1930, for the Brooklyn Robins

Last MLB appearance
- September 10, 1935, for the Cincinnati Reds

MLB statistics
- Batting average: .257
- Home runs: 8
- Runs batted in: 123
- Stats at Baseball Reference

Teams
- Brooklyn Robins / Dodgers (1930–1932); St. Louis Cardinals (1933); Cincinnati Reds (1934–1935)

Gordon Leigh Slade (October 9, 1904 – January 2, 1974), nicknamed Oskie, was an American professional baseball shortstop. He played six seasons in Major League Baseball (MLB) from 1930 to 1935 for the Brooklyn Robins/Dodgers, St. Louis Cardinals, and Cincinnati Reds. As a member of the Brooklyn Dodgers in 1932, Slade was thrown out of a game for arguing by National League umpire Charlie Moran.

In 437 games over six seasons, Slade posted a .257 batting average (353-for-1372) with 147 runs, 60 doubles, 11 triples, 8 home runs, 123 RBI and 84 bases on balls. He finished his career with an overall .953 fielding percentage.

== See also ==
- List of Major League Baseball players with a home run in their first major league at bat
