= Hal Lee =

American baseball player (1905-1989)

- Outfielder
- Born: February 15, 1905; Ludlow, Mississippi, U.S.
- Died: September 4, 1989 (aged 84); Pascagoula, Mississippi, U.S.
- Batted: Right Threw: Right

MLB debut
- April 29, 1930, for the Brooklyn Robins

Last MLB appearance
- September 27, 1936, for the Boston Braves

MLB statistics
- Batting average: .275
- Home runs: 33
- Runs batted in: 323
- Stats at Baseball Reference

Teams
- Brooklyn Robins (1930); Philadelphia Phillies (1931–1933); Boston Braves / Bees (1933–1936)

Harold Burnham "Sheriff" Lee (February 15, 1905 – September 4, 1989) was an American professional baseball outfielder. He played Major League Baseball (MLB) for the Brooklyn Robins, Philadelphia Phillies, and Boston Braves / Bees between 1930 and 1936.

In 752 games over seven seasons, Lee posted a .275 batting average (755-for-2750) with 316 runs, 144 doubles, 40 triples, 33 home runs, 323 RBI, 15 stolen bases, and 203 bases on balls. He finished his career with an overall .970 fielding percentage.

On May 30, 1935, Lee replaced Babe Ruth in left field for the Boston Braves in what would be Ruth's last game.

After his time in the major leagues, Lee went to the Texas League in 1939-40, where he was a player-manager for Dallas.

Hal Lee was a 1928 graduate of Mississippi College, where he played football, basketball, and baseball. Lee was Captain of the Mississippi College football team in 1927 and the baseball team in 1928. Lee is a member of the Mississippi College Athletics Hall of Fame and the Mississippi Sports Hall of Fame.
