= Neal Finn =

American baseball player (1904–1933)

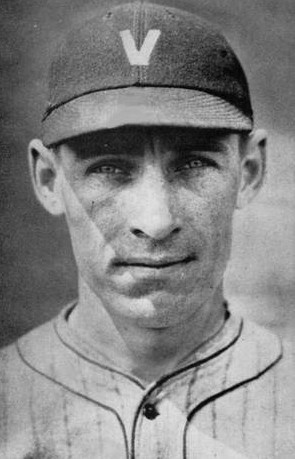
- Second baseman
- Born: January 24, 1904; Brooklyn, New York, U.S.
- Died: July 7, 1933 (aged 29); Allentown, Pennsylvania, U.S.
- Batted: Right Threw: Right

MLB debut
- April 21, 1930, for the Brooklyn Robins

Last MLB appearance
- June 17, 1933, for the Philadelphia Phillies

MLB statistics
- Batting average: .262
- Home runs: 3
- Runs batted in: 102
- Stats at Baseball Reference

Teams
- Brooklyn Robins/Dodgers (1930–1932); Philadelphia Phillies (1933)

Cornelius Francis "Neal" Finn (January 24, 1904 – July 7, 1933) was an American professional baseball second baseman. He played in Major League Baseball (MLB) for the Brooklyn Robins / Dodgers and Philadelphia Phillies. Finn was born in Brooklyn, New York.

Finn was also an alternate for the silver medal winning USA II bobsled team at the 1932 Winter Olympic Games. He died during the 1933 season after surgery to repair an ulcer.

In 321 games over four seasons, Finn posted a .262 batting average (274-for-1044) with 125 runs, 3 home runs and 102 RBI. He finished his career with a .961 fielding percentage playing at second and third base.

== See also ==
- List of baseball players who died during their careers
