= 1951 Baseball Hall of Fame balloting =

Elections to the Baseball Hall of Fame

National Baseball

Hall of Fame and Museum
- New inductees: 2
- via BBWAA: 2
- Total inductees: 60
- Induction date: July 23, 1951

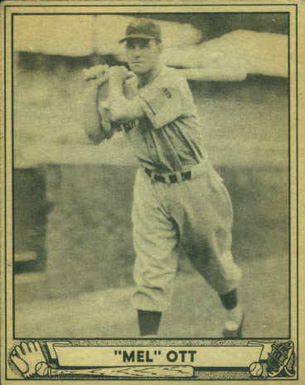
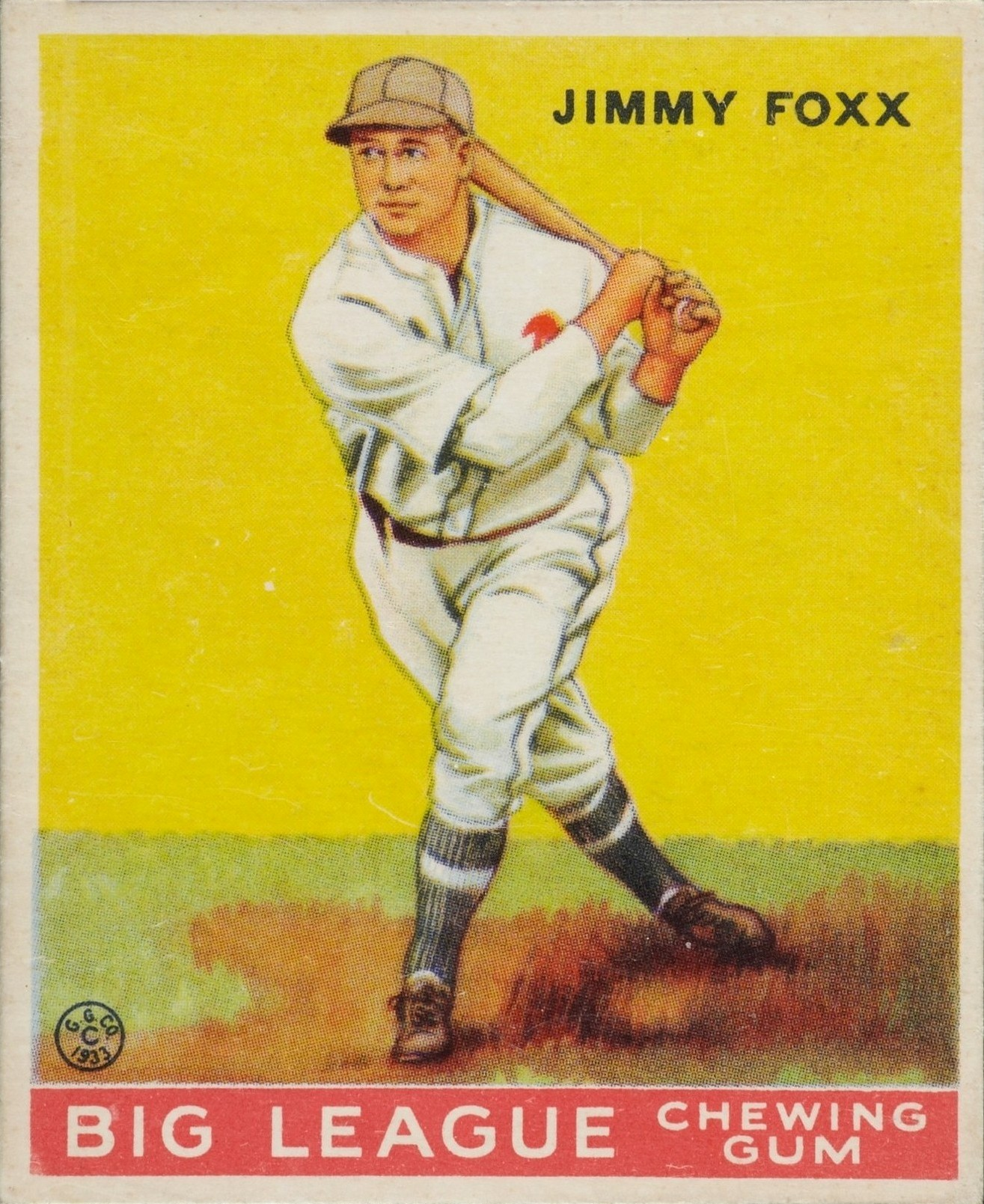
1951 inductees Mel Ott (left) and Jimmie Foxx

Elections to the Baseball Hall of Fame for 1951 followed the same rules as 1950. The Baseball Writers' Association of America (BBWAA) voted once by mail to select from major league players retired less than 25 years. It elected two, Jimmie Foxx and Mel Ott. Meanwhile, the Old-Timers Committee, with jurisdiction over earlier players and other figures, did not meet. A formal induction ceremony was held in Cooperstown, New York, on July 23, 1951, with National League president Ford Frick in attendance.

== BBWAA election ==
The 10-year members of the BBWAA had the authority to select any players active in 1926 or later, provided they had not been active in 1950. Voters were instructed to cast votes for 10 candidates; any candidate receiving votes on at least 75% of the ballots would be honored with induction to the Hall.

A total of 226 ballots were cast, with 2,167 individual votes for 86 specific candidates, an average of 9.59 per ballot; 170 votes were required for election. The two candidates who received at least 75% of the vote and were elected are indicated in bold italics.

The voters' focus this year was on sluggers. Mel Ott and Jimmie Foxx both had over 500 home runs on their resumes. Rounding out the top five were batting average champions Paul Waner, Harry Heilmann, and Bill Terry. Popular hurler Dizzy Dean was sixth.

Player	Votes	Percent	Change
**Mel Ott**	197	87.2	▲18.7%
**Jimmie Foxx**	179	79.2	▲17.9%
Paul Waner	162	71.7	▲15.2%
Harry Heilmann	153	67.7	▲15.9%
Bill Terry	148	65.5	▲3.0%
Dizzy Dean	145	64.2	▲13.6%
Bill Dickey	118	52.2	▲5.8%
Al Simmons	116	51.3	▼2.3%
Rabbit Maranville	110	48.7	▲9.4%
Ted Lyons	71	31.4	▲6.4%
Dazzy Vance	70	31.0	Steady
Hank Greenberg	67	29.6	▼8.5%
Gabby Hartnett	57	25.2	▼6.9%
Joe Cronin	44	19.5	▼0.1%
Ray Schalk	37	16.4	▲6.9%
Chief Bender	35	15.5	▲11.9%
Ross Youngs	34	15.0	▲4.9%
Max Carey	27	11.9	▲3.6%
Tony Lazzeri	27	11.9	▼3.6%
Hank Gowdy	26	11.5	-
Lefty Gomez	23	10.2	▼0.5%
Edd Roush	21	9.3	▼0.2%
Hack Wilson	21	9.3	▼0.2%
Pepper Martin	19	8.4	▲4.2%
Zack Wheat	19	8.4	▼1.7%
Chuck Klein	15	6.6	▼1.7%
Waite Hoyt	13	5.8	▼0.7%
Lefty O'Doul	13	5.8	▲0.4%
Babe Adams	12	5.3	▲1.7%
Dave Bancroft	9	4.0	▼1.4%
Charlie Grimm	9	4.0	▼3.7%
Bucky Harris	9	4.0	▲1.6%
Red Ruffing	9	4.0	▼3.1%
Frank Baker	8	3.5	▲1.1%
Kiki Cuyler	8	3.5	▼3.0%
Red Faber	8	3.5	▼1.9%
Bill McKechnie	8	3.5	▲2.9%
Casey Stengel	8	3.5	▲1.7%
Cy Williams	7	3.1	▼2.3%
Jim Bottomley	6	2.7	▼2.1%
Red Rolfe	6	2.7	▼1.5%
Burleigh Grimes	5	2.2	▼1.4%
Eppa Rixey	5	2.2	▼1.4%
Smoky Joe Wood	5	2.2	▲1.6%
Art Fletcher	4	1.8	▲1.2%
Travis Jackson	4	1.8	▼1.8%
Art Nehf	4	1.8	▲0.6%
Al Schacht	4	1.8	-
Billy Southworth	4	1.8	▲1.2%
Jimmy Dykes	3	1.3	▲0.1%
Stan Hack	3	1.3	▼3.5%
Harry Hooper	3	1.3	▲0.1%
Dickey Kerr	3	1.3	-
Ernie Lombardi	3	1.3	▼0.5%
Rube Marquard	3	1.3	-
Stuffy McInnis	3	1.3	▲0.7%
Steve O'Neill	3	1.3	▲0.7%
Duffy Lewis	2	0.9	-
Sherry Magee	2	0.9	▲0.3%
Everett Scott	2	0.9	▼0.9%
George Selkirk	2	0.9	▲0.3%
Jimmie Wilson	2	0.9	▼1.5%
Dick Bartell	1	0.4	-
Spud Chandler	1	0.4	▼0.8%
Jack Coombs	1	0.4	-
Wilbur Cooper	1	0.4	-
Jake Daubert	1	0.4	-
Paul Derringer	1	0.4	▼0.2%
Howard Ehmke	1	0.4	-
Charlie Gelbert	1	0.4	▼0.2%
Chick Hafey	1	0.4	▼2.0%
Mel Harder	1	0.4	▼0.8%
Babe Herman	1	0.4	▼0.8%
Pinky Higgins	1	0.4	▼0.8%
Tim Jordan	1	0.4	-
Joe McCarthy	1	0.4	-
Clyde Milan	1	0.4	▼0.2%
Satchel Paige	1	0.4	-
Hub Pruett	1	0.4	▼0.2%
Sam Rice	1	0.4	▼0.2%
Eddie Rommel	1	0.4	▼0.2%
Dick Rudolph	1	0.4	-
Muddy Ruel	1	0.4	▼2.0%
Bill Sherdel	1	0.4	▼0.2%
Lloyd Waner	1	0.4	▼0.2%
Glenn Wright	1	0.4	▼0.8%

Key to colors
Elected to the Hall. These individuals are also indicated in **bold italics**.
Players who were elected in future elections. These individuals are also indicated in plain italics.

== Sources ==
- James, Bill (1994). The Politics of Glory: How Baseball's Hall of Fame Really Works. Macmillan. ISBN 0025107747. "Note: reissued in paperback as Whatever Happened to the Hall of Fame?"
