= Gabby Hartnett =

American baseball player and manager (1900–1972)

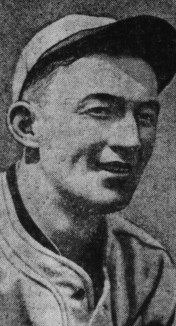
- Hartnett in 1925
- Catcher / Manager
- Born: December 20, 1900; Woonsocket, Rhode Island, U.S.
- Died: December 20, 1972 (aged 72); Park Ridge, Illinois, U.S.
- Batted: Right Threw: Right

MLB debut
- April 12, 1922, for the Chicago Cubs

Last MLB appearance
- September 24, 1941, for the New York Giants

MLB statistics
- Batting average: .297
- Home runs: 236
- Runs batted in: 1,179
- Managerial record: 203–176
- Winning %: .536
- Stats at Baseball Reference

Teams
- As player: Chicago Cubs (1922–1940); New York Giants (1941); As manager: Chicago Cubs (1938–1940)

Career highlights and awards
- 6× All-Star (1933–1938); NL MVP (1935); Chicago Cubs Hall of Fame

Member of the National

Baseball Hall of Fame
- Induction: 1955
- Vote: 77.7% (12th ballot)

Charles Leo "Gabby" Hartnett (December 20, 1900 – December 20, 1972), also nicknamed "Old Tomato Face", was an American professional baseball player and manager. He played almost his entire career in Major League Baseball as a catcher with the Chicago Cubs, from 1922 to 1940. He spent the final season of his career as a player-coach with the New York Giants in 1941. After his playing career, Hartnett continued his involvement in baseball as a coach and as a minor league manager.

Hartnett was an all-around player, performing well both offensively and defensively. Known for his strong and accurate throwing arm, he routinely led the National League's catchers in caught stealing percentage and was the first major league catcher to hit more than 20 home runs in a season. During the course of his career, Hartnett took part in some of the more memorable events in Major League Baseball history including: being behind the plate for Babe Ruth allegedly calling his shot during the 1932 World Series, Carl Hubbell's strike-out performance in the 1934 All-Star Game and Dizzy Dean's career-altering injury during the 1937 All-Star Game. However, the greatest moment of Hartnett's career came with one week left in the 1938 season, when he hit a game-winning home run in the bottom of the ninth inning to put the Cubs in first place. The event, which occurred as darkness descended onto Wrigley Field, became immortalized as the "Homer in the Gloamin'".

Prior to the career of Johnny Bench, Hartnett was considered the greatest catcher in the history of the National League. A six-time All-Star, he appeared in four World Series during his playing career. At the time of his retirement, Hartnett held the career records for catchers in home runs, runs batted in, hits, doubles and most games played as a catcher. Hartnett was inducted into the Baseball Hall of Fame in 1955.

== Life and career ==
=== Early life ===
Hartnett was born in Woonsocket, Rhode Island, as the eldest of 14 children. His father moved the family to Millville, Massachusetts, just over the state line from Woonsocket, when he took a job at Banigan's Millville Rubber Shop. He began his professional baseball career at the age of 20 with the Worcester Boosters of the Eastern League in 1921. New York Giants manager John McGraw sent scout Jesse Burkett to appraise Hartnett's talent as a player. Burkett reported back to McGraw that Hartnett's hands were too small for a major league catcher.

=== Professional career ===
Hartnett joined the Cubs in 1922, serving as a backup catcher to Bob O'Farrell. He was given his ironic nickname of "Gabby" as a rookie due to his shy, reticent nature. On July 22, O'Farrell suffered a fractured skull during a game against the Boston Braves and Hartnett took over as the Cubs starting catcher, posting a .299 batting average along with 16 home runs and 67 runs batted in. After the retirement of catcher Bill Killefer, Hartnett became the favorite catcher of Baseball Hall of Fame pitcher Grover Cleveland Alexander and caught Alexander's 300th career win on September 20, 1924. Hartnett played well enough during O'Farrell's absence the Cubs decided to keep him as their starting catcher, trading O'Farrell to the St. Louis Cardinals in May 1925.

=== Rise to stardom ===
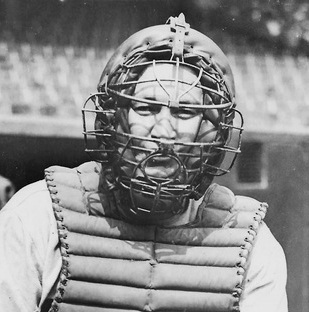
Hartnett, c. 1932

Hartnett hit 24 home runs in 1925, breaking the single-season home run record for catchers set by Jack Clements in 1893. He finished second overall in the National League behind the 39 home runs hit by Rogers Hornsby. Although Hartnett led National League catchers in errors, he also led in range factor and in putouts, while his strong throwing arm helped him lead the league in assists and caught stealing percentage. Leo Durocher, who played against Hartnett and was a National League manager during Johnny Bench's career, stated that the two catchers had similarly strong throwing arms. During the major league baseball winter meetings in December 1925, it was rumored Hartnett might be traded to the New York Giants for catcher Frank Snyder and outfielder Irish Meusel; however, Cubs president Bill Veeck Sr., squelched the rumors saying Hartnett would not be traded for anybody.

The young catcher had a disappointing year in 1926 as his batting average dropped to .275 with only 41 runs batted in. Hartnett's offensive statistics rebounded in 1927, producing a .294 batting average with 10 home runs and 80 runs batted in. Although he led the league's catchers in putouts, assists and in baserunners caught stealing, his inexperience showed as he also led the league in errors and in passed balls. He finished tenth in the balloting for the 1927 National League Most Valuable Player Award.

=== Career prime ===
In 1928, Hartnett hit above .300 for the first time, posting a .302 batting average with 14 home runs. He also surpassed Jack Clements' major league record of 72 career home runs by a catcher. Hartnett also led National League catchers in assists, caught stealing percentage and in fielding percentage. As he matured as a player, he became more disciplined on the field and committed fewer errors. He threw the baseball around the infield in a fearless manner, throwing out baserunners with a high degree of accuracy. Between 1928 and 1938, Hartnett led the league's catchers in fielding percentage seven times.

In 1929, Hartnett injured his throwing arm by making a hard throw without warming up. The arm ailment limited him to one game behind the plate and 24 games as a pinch hitter as the Cubs won the National League pennant. Hartnett struck out in all three of his at bats in the 1929 World Series against the Philadelphia Athletics. He rebounded with his best season in 1930, hitting for a .339 batting average with career highs of 122 runs batted in, a .630 slugging percentage and 37 home runs, breaking his own single-season home run record for catchers. Hartnett led all National League catchers in putouts, assists, fielding percentage and in baserunners caught stealing. His single-season home run record for catchers stood for 23 years, until Roy Campanella hit 40 home runs in 1953.

In a stunt on April 1, 1930, in Los Angeles, he caught a baseball dropped either 550 or 800 feet (170 or 240 m) from a Goodyear Blimp. If dropped from 800 feet, it would have been traveling 95.5 miles per hour (153.7 km/h) at the time it was caught.

During an exhibition game against the Chicago White Sox on September 9, 1931, Hartnett was photographed while signing an autograph for gangster Al Capone. After the photograph was published in newspapers across the United States, Hartnett received a telegram from Baseball Commissioner Kenesaw Mountain Landis instructing him not to have his photograph taken with Capone in the future. Hartnett replied with a telegram to the Commissioner whimsically stating, "OK, but if you don't want me to have my picture taken with Al Capone, you tell him."

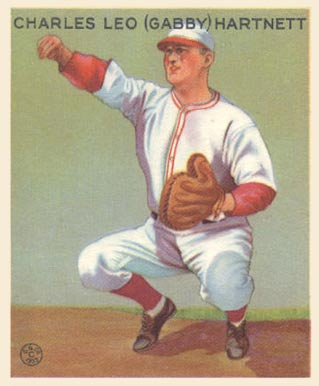
Hartnett on a 1933 Goudey card

In 1932, Hartnett guided the Cubs' pitching staff to the lowest team earned run average in the league, as the Cubs clinched the National League pennant by 4 games over the Pittsburgh Pirates. Hartnett was the Cubs' catcher on October 1, in Game 3 of the 1932 World Series against the New York Yankees when Babe Ruth hit his debated "called shot." Although he hit for a .313 batting average with 1 home run, the Yankees won the series in a four-game sweep.

In 1933, Hartnett was selected to be a reserve catcher for the National League team in the inaugural Major League Baseball All-Star Game held on July 6, 1933. It was the first of six consecutive All-Star game selections for Hartnett. At the mid-season point of the 1934 season, Hartnett was hitting for a .336 batting average with 13 home runs to earn the starting catcher's role for the National League team in the 1934 All-Star Game. Hartnett was calling the pitches for Carl Hubbell in the 1934 All-Star Game when the Giants pitcher set a record by striking out future Hall of Fame members Babe Ruth, Lou Gehrig, Jimmie Foxx, Al Simmons, and Joe Cronin in succession. Hartnett ended the 1934 season with another strong offensive performance, hitting for a .299 batting average with 22 home runs and 90 runs batted in. He dominated the defensive statistics, leading the league's catchers in assists, putouts, baserunners caught stealing, caught stealing percentage, range factor and in fielding percentage.

Hartnett had another impressive season in 1935 when he produced a .344 batting average, third-highest in the league and led the league's catchers in assists, double plays, and fielding percentage. He also led the Cubs pitching staff to the lowest earned run average in the league as they won the National League pennant by 4 games over the St. Louis Cardinals. For his performance, Hartnett was named the recipient of the 1935 National League Most Valuable Player Award. The Cubs lost to the Detroit Tigers led by Mickey Cochrane in the 1935 World Series.

The Cubs fell to third place in 1936, as Hartnett had a sub-standard year for him, hitting only 7 home runs with 64 runs batted in, although he still hit above .300 with a .307 average, and earned his fourth consecutive All-Star selection. Defensively, he led the league's catchers in fielding percentage, and his pitch-calling skills helped the Cubs pitching staff lead the league with 18 shutouts. In the 1937 All-Star Game, pitcher Dizzy Dean kept shaking off Hartnett's signs for a curve ball resulting in a hit by Joe DiMaggio, a home run by Lou Gehrig and finally, a line drive off the bat of Earl Averill that struck Dean on his toe. Dean had been one of the preeminent pitchers in the National League until the injury to his toe eventually led to the end of his baseball playing career. Hartnett ended the 1937 season with a career-high .354 batting average and finished second to Joe Medwick in voting for the National League Most Valuable Player Award. His .354 batting average in 1937 was the highest batting average by a major league catcher for 60 years until 1997, when Mike Piazza posted a .362 average.

=== Homer in the Gloamin' ===
1939 card of Hartnett

On July 20, 1938, Cubs owner Philip K. Wrigley named the 37-year-old Hartnett as the team's player-manager, replacing Charlie Grimm. When Hartnett took over as manager, the Cubs had been in third place, six games behind the first place Pittsburgh Pirates led by Pie Traynor. By September 27, with one week left in the season, the Cubs had battled back to within a game and a half game of the Pirates in the National League standings as the two teams met for a crucial three-game series. The Cubs won the first game of the series with a 2–1 victory by pitcher Dizzy Dean, cutting the Pirates' lead to a half game and setting the stage for one of baseball's most memorable moments.

On September 28, 1938, the two teams met for the second game of the series, where Hartnett experienced the highlight of his career. With darkness descending on the lightless Wrigley Field and the score tied at 5 runs apiece, the umpires ruled that the ninth inning would be the last to be played. The entire game would have to be replayed the following day if the score remained tied. Hartnett came to bat with two out in the bottom of the ninth inning. With a count of 0 balls and 2 strikes, Hartnett connected on a Mace Brown pitch, launching the ball into the darkness, before it eventually landed in the left-center field bleachers. The stadium erupted into pandemonium as players and fans stormed the field to escort Hartnett around the bases. Hartnett's walk-off home run became immortalized as the "Homer in the Gloamin'".

The Cubs were in first place, culminating an impressive 19–3–1 record in September, and the pennant was clinched three days later. Hartnett once again led the Cubs pitching staff to the lowest earned run average in the league and led National League catchers with a .995 fielding percentage. However, the Cubs were swept in the 1938 World Series by the New York Yankees, their fourth Series loss in ten years.

=== Later career ===
Hartnett felt the strain of managing a team during the 1939 season as he faced player discontent over the pampering of Dizzy Dean while pitcher Larry French went over his head to complain to owner Philip Wrigley about his lack of pitching assignments. French felt he was being punished for requesting to have Gus Mancuso as his catcher. In addition, Hartnett was forced to pencil himself into the lineup more often because the Cubs' other catchers had little luck at the plate. On August 28, 1939, he broke Ray Schalk's major league record of 1,727 career games as a catcher. His record for longevity was surpassed by Al López during the 1945 season.

After two disappointing seasons, Hartnett was dismissed by the Cubs on November 13, 1940, after 19 years with the club. On December 3, he signed a contract with the New York Giants to be a player-coach. Hartnett hit for a .300 average in 64 games as a backup catcher to Harry Danning in the 1941 season. Hartnett played his final game on September 24, 1941, retiring as a player at the age of 40.

== Career statistics ==
In a 20-year major league career, Hartnett played in 1,990 games, accumulating 1,912 hits in 6,432 at bats for a .297 career batting average along with 867 runs, 396 doubles, 64 triples, 236 home runs, 1,179 runs batted in, 703 bases on balls, .370 on-base percentage and .489 slugging percentage. He retired with a .984 career fielding percentage. Hartnett caught 100 or more games for a league record 12 times, including a record eight seasons in a row. He led the National League in putouts four times and in assists and fielding percentage six times. Hartnett led the league seven times in double plays and set a National league record with 163 career double plays. He set a since-broken major league record for catchers of 452 consecutive chances without committing an error.

He was also a solid pinch hitter in his MLB career, recording a .281 batting average (43-for-153) including four home runs and 41 RBI's in 190 pinch-hitting appearances. In 1929, he had 11 RBI in a pinch-hitting role.

At the time of his retirement, Hartnett's 236 home runs, 1,179 runs batted in, 1,912 hits, and 396 doubles were all records for catchers. Bill Dickey surpassed his records for most runs batted in and hits in 1943, while his career home run record for catchers was broken by Yogi Berra in 1956. His career mark for doubles stood until 1983 when it was broken by Ted Simmons. Hartnett also finished among the National League's top ten in slugging percentage seven times in his career. A six-time All-Star, he was the recipient of one Most Valuable Player Award and played on four pennant-winning teams. Hartnett's .370 career on-base percentage was higher than the .342 posted by Johnny Bench and the .348 posted by Yogi Berra. His 56.11% career caught stealing percentage ranks second to Roy Campanella among major league catchers. Hartnett's bat and catcher's mask were the first artifacts sent to the newly constructed Baseball Hall of Fame in 1938. In his book, The Bill James Historical Baseball Abstract, baseball historian Bill James ranked Hartnett 9th all-time among major league catchers.

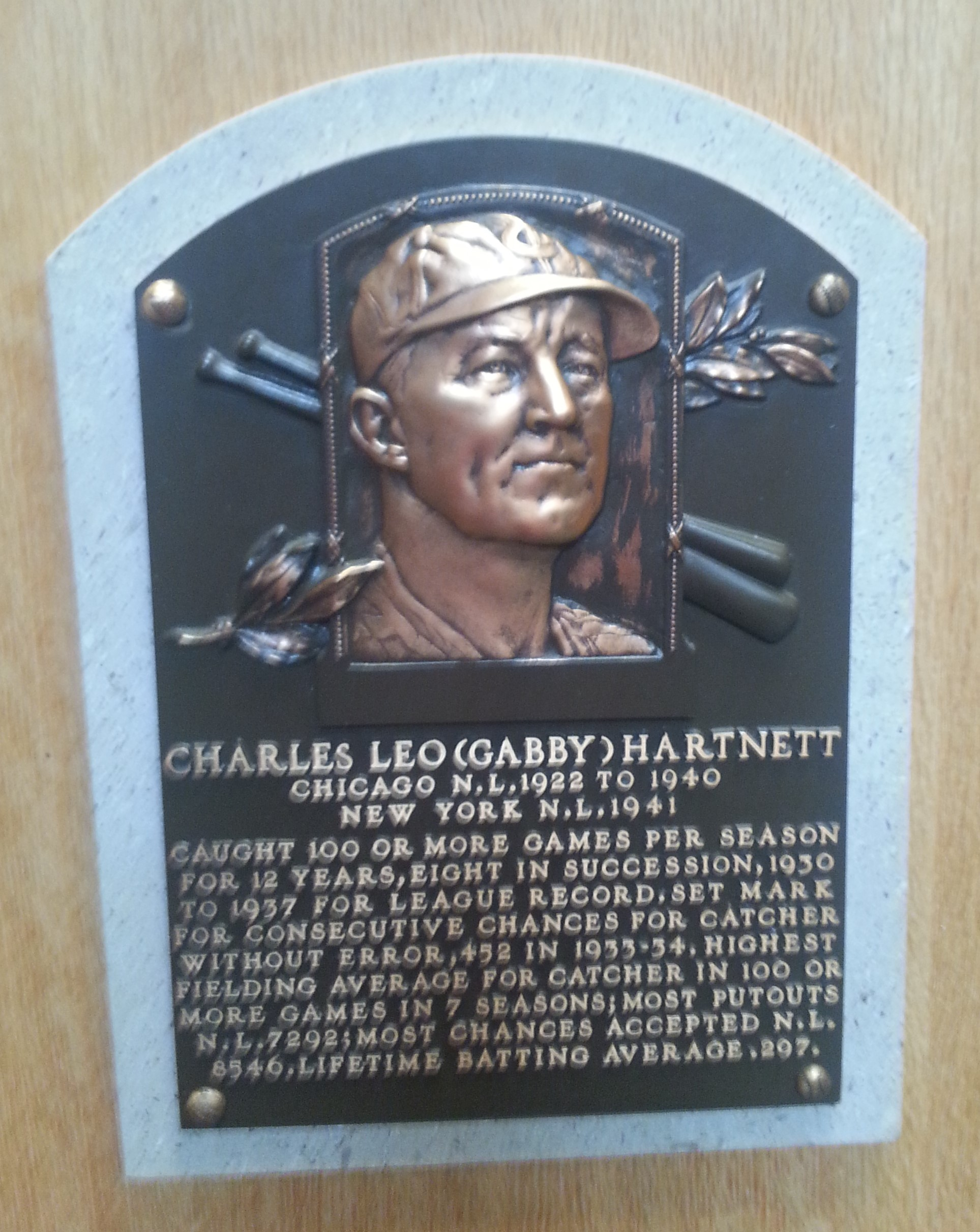
Hartnett's plaque at the Baseball Hall of Fame

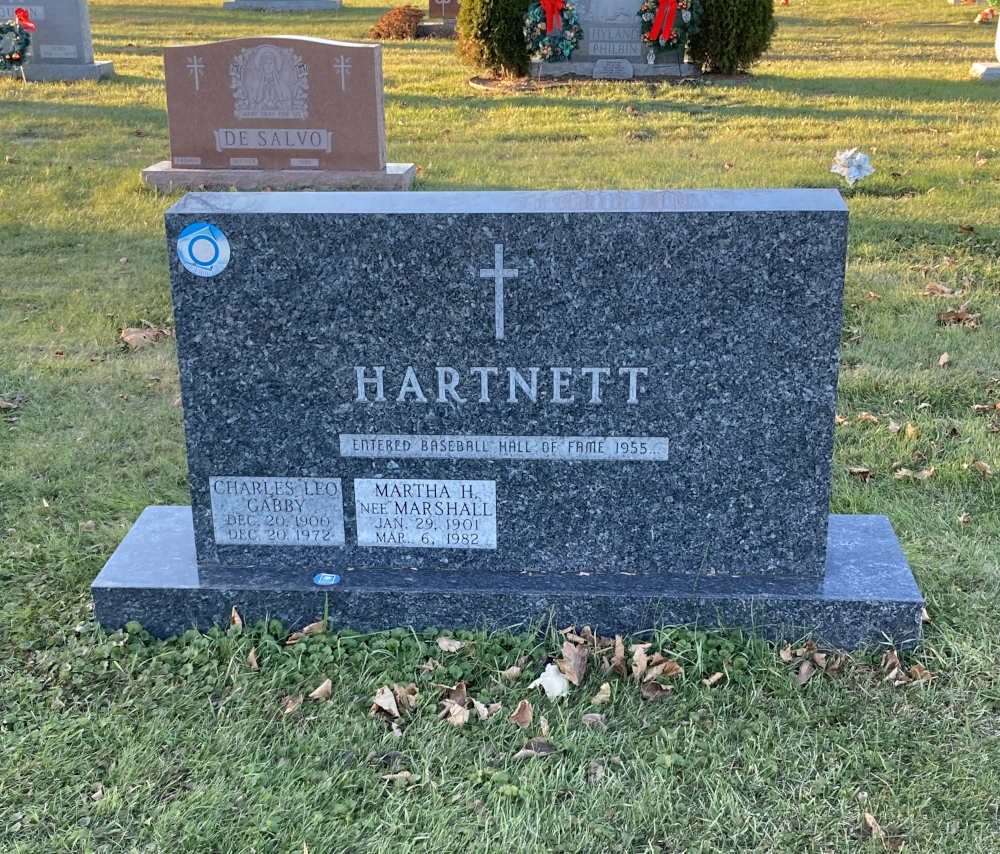
Hartnett's grave at All Saints Cemetery

== Post-playing career and retirement ==
Afterwards, Hartnett managed in the minor leagues for five seasons, retiring to Lincolnwood, Illinois, in 1946. On January 26, 1955, he was elected to the Baseball Hall of Fame along with Joe DiMaggio, Ted Lyons and Dazzy Vance. In 1981, Lawrence Ritter and Donald Honig included Hartnett in their book The 100 Greatest Baseball Players of All Time. In 1999, he was named as a finalist to the Major League Baseball All-Century Team.

Hartnett also served as a color commentator for CBS' Major League Baseball telecasts. Hartnett in particular, alongside Bob Finnegan called the April 11, 1959, contest between Los Angeles Dodgers and Chicago Cubs and the June 12, 1960, contest between the Philadelphia Phillies and the Cubs.

In his last job in the majors Hartnett worked as a coach and scout with the Kansas City Athletics for two years in the mid-1960s.

Hartnett died of cirrhosis in Park Ridge, Illinois, on his 72nd birthday in 1972, and is interred in All Saints Cemetery in Des Plaines, Illinois.

== See also ==
- List of Major League Baseball career home run leaders
- List of Major League Baseball career runs batted in leaders
- List of Major League Baseball player-managers
