= Mel Ott =

American baseball player and manager (1909–1958)

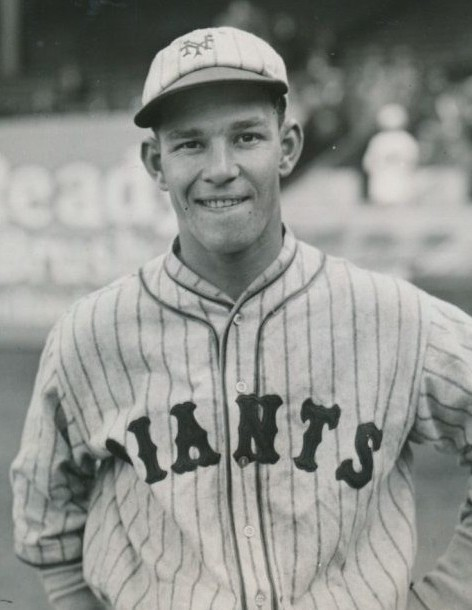
- Ott in 1927
- Right fielder / Manager
- Born: March 2, 1909; Gretna, Louisiana, U.S.
- Died: November 21, 1958 (aged 49); New Orleans, Louisiana, U.S.
- Batted: Left Threw: Right

MLB debut
- April 27, 1926, for the New York Giants

Last MLB appearance
- July 11, 1947, for the New York Giants

MLB statistics
- Batting average: .304
- Hits: 2,876
- Home runs: 511
- Runs batted in: 1,860
- Managerial record: 464–530
- Winning %: .467
- Stats at Baseball Reference
- Managerial record at Baseball Reference

Teams
- As player: New York Giants (1926–1947); As manager: New York Giants (1942–1948)

Career highlights and awards
- 12× All-Star (1934–1945); World Series champion (1933); 6× NL home run leader (1932, 1934, 1936–1938, 1942); NL RBI leader (1934); San Francisco Giants No. 4 retired

Member of the National

Baseball Hall of Fame
- Induction: 1951
- Vote: 87.2% (third ballot)

Melvin Thomas Ott (March 2, 1909 – November 21, 1958), nicknamed "Master Melvin", was an American professional baseball right fielder, who played in Major League Baseball (MLB) for the New York Giants, from 1926 through 1947.

He batted left-handed and threw right-handed. Though unusually slight in stature for a power hitter, at 5 feet 9 inches (1.75 m), 170 pounds (77 kg), Ott led the National League in home runs a then-record six times. He was an All-Star for 11 consecutive seasons, (Note: MLB cancelled the 1945 All-Star Game and did not name All-Stars that season.) and was the first National League player to surpass 500 career home runs.

Ott was elected to the National Baseball Hall of Fame in 1951.

== Early life ==
Ott was born in Gretna, Louisiana, a suburb of New Orleans. He was a second cousin of the Roman Catholic Bishop of Baton Rouge, Stanley Joseph Ott. Despite his average height, he quickly established himself as a gifted athlete, especially in baseball. During high school, he played on a semi-pro team three or four days a week. He already showed considerable power at a young age and was getting paid for it. His team had a tradition of passing the hat whenever a player hit a home run that figured in a victory, meaning Ott was taking home money for playing baseball as early as 14.

== Playing career ==
Despite his power, Ott's hometown minor league team, the New Orleans Pelicans, refused to sign him because of concerns about his size. He then found a job at a lumber company in Patterson, near Morgan City, where he became a sensation on the company baseball team. Company owner Henry Williams was particularly impressed with Ott. While visiting New York, he suggested that Giants manager John McGraw give him a tryout. Ott was skeptical at first, so Williams bought Ott a train ticket to New York.

After a brief college career at the University of Alabama in 1924, Ott arrived in New York in early September. He quickly impressed observers with his hitting, especially McGraw, who predicted that he would be "one of the greatest lefthand hitters the National League has ever seen." He formally signed Ott to a contract in January 1926.

=== Regular season ===
Ott had originally been a catcher, but McGraw concluded that Ott was too small to be a major league catcher and converted him into an outfielder. On July 27 of the 1927 season, Ott recorded his first career home run, doing so on a line drive to center field for an inside-the-park home run. After two years as a part-time player, he became the regular right fielder in 1929 at the age of 20. He didn't disappoint, hitting .328 in 150 games while setting career highs in home runs (42) and RBI (151)—both records for players who were 20 years old or younger at the start of the season. Ott's 1929 batting average of .328 is his second highest season average for a full-time player trailing only his 1930 campaign with a .349 average. By the time Ott reached the age of 25, he had accumulated 1,249 hits, the second highest total for a 25-year-old in MLB history, behind only Ty Cobb (1,433).

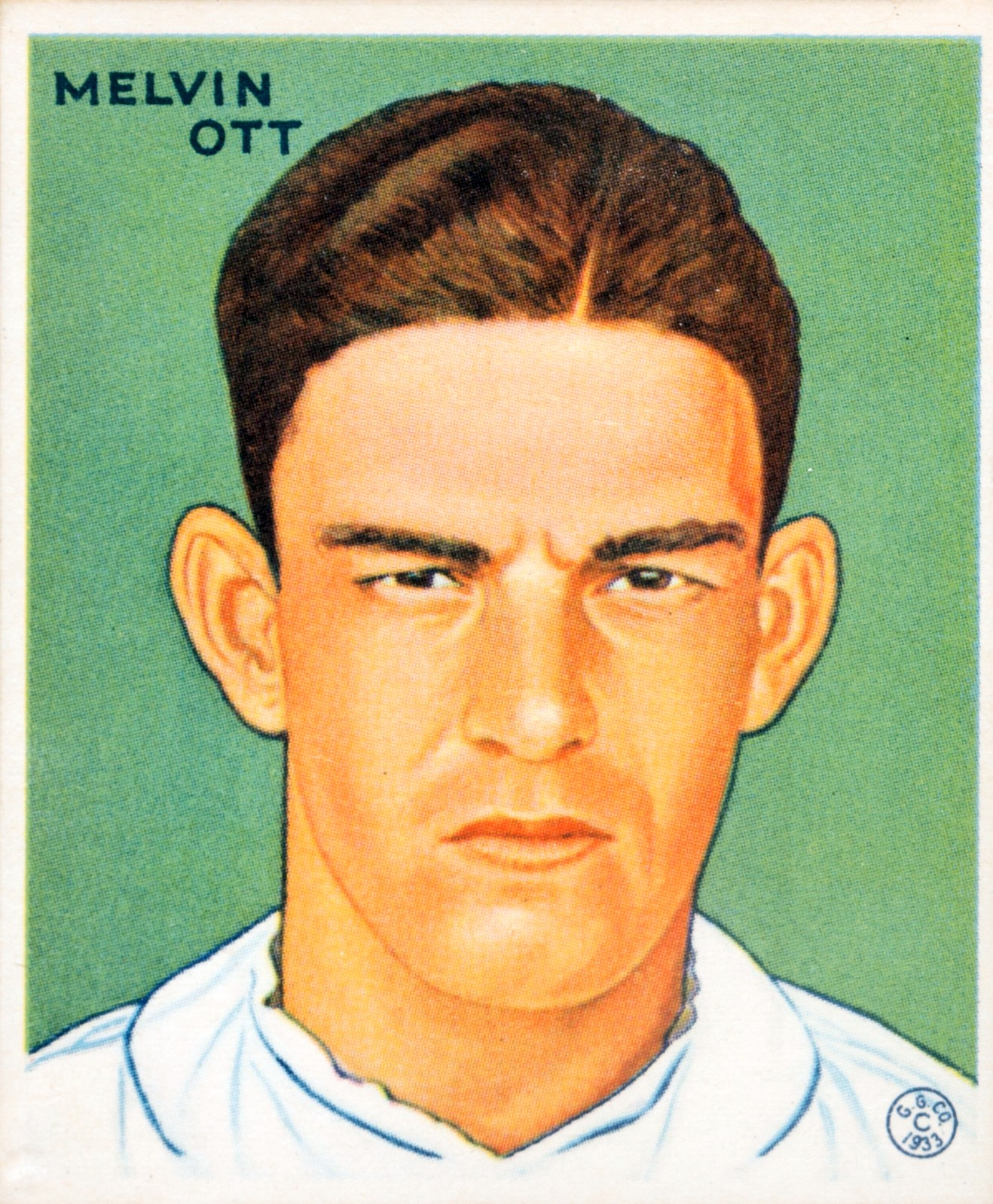
Ott's 1933 Goudey baseball card

Ott was a six-time NL home run leader, in 1932, 1934, 1936–1938, and 1942. From 1928 through 1945, he led the New York Giants in home runs. This 18-season consecutive dominance is a record; no other player has ever led his team in more consecutive years in a single Triple Crown category. He was both the youngest player to hit 100 home runs and the first National Leaguer to hit 500 home runs. He passed Rogers Hornsby to become the all-time NL home run leader in 1937 and held that title until Willie Mays passed him in 1966.

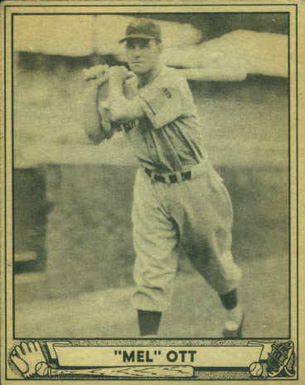
Ott's 1940 Bowman Play Ball baseball card

Ott was noted for reaching base via the walk. He drew five walks in a game four times, which remains a major league record. He set the National League record for most walks in a doubleheader, with six, on October 5, 1929, and did it again on April 30, 1944. He tied an MLB record by drawing a walk in seven consecutive plate appearances (June 16–18, 1943). He also led the NL in walks six times: in 1929, 1931–1933, 1937, and 1942.

He twice scored six runs in a game, on August 4, 1934, and on April 30, 1944. He is the only player with multiple 6-run games in MLB history. He is the youngest major leaguer to ever hit for the cycle. Ott was the first NL player to post eight consecutive 100-RBI seasons, and only Willie Mays, Sammy Sosa, Chipper Jones, and Albert Pujols have since joined him.

He used a batting style that was then considered unorthodox, lifting his forward (right) foot prior to impact. When McGraw first saw Ott's style, he called it "the most natural swing I've seen in years. Alvin Dark said that Ott "lifted his lead foot right off the ground like he was getting ready to kick at a dog". This style helped him hit for power. More recent players who used a similar style include Harold Baines and Kirby Puckett, as well as the Japanese home run king, Sadaharu Oh.

In 1943, all of his 18 home runs came at home; only two other players ever had a greater number of all-homefield home runs. Of Ott's 511 career home runs, 323 of them, or 63%, came at home. He had seven seasons where he hit at least twenty home runs at the Polo Grounds, with the most being 24 in the 1932 season. Because of this, his home run record historically has been downplayed, suggesting that a 257-foot (78 m) foul line at the Polo Grounds resulted in higher numbers at home. Sportswriters often jokingly referred to him as the master of the "Chinese home run" as such short homers were called at the time; Ott would often respond by noting that if it was so easy to inflate his homer totals by hitting over that fence, all other hitters in the league would be doing it.

As a balance, the Polo Grounds had the deepest power alleys in baseball. Also, Ott hit more career home runs in foreign stadiums than any other National League hitter at the time of his retirement. In some of his better seasons, he hit more homers on the road than in the Polo Grounds.

There may be reason to believe that he was a better hitter than his record suggests because of differences in National League and American League ball specifications. Those differences are considered the greatest in the history of the game and made it considerably harder for National League hitters to achieve home runs.

Ott was also a skilled fielder. He was a master at playing balls that bounced off the fences at the Polo Grounds, allowing him to garner 26 assists in 1929, his first full season as a full-time player. He would never even approach that figure again, as baserunners quickly realized it was far too risky to run on balls hit in Ott's direction.

During the prime of Ott's career, 11 seasons from 1931 to 1941, American League batters averaged 21% more home runs—peaking at 41% more home runs—than their National League counterparts. Babe Ruth and Jimmie Foxx, contemporaries, and both American League players, were the only batters to surpass Ott's record during this time.

=== Post-season ===
Ott played in the World Series in 1933, 1936, and 1937, winning in 1933. He hit two home runs during the 1933 World Series. In Game 1, he had four hits, including a two-run home run in the first inning. In Game 5, he drove in the series-winning run with two outs in the top of the 10th, driving a pitch into the center-field bleachers. In the 1936 World Series, Ott had seven hits and one home run. In 1937, he had four hits and one home run. Playing in 16 World Series games, Ott batted .295 (18-for-61) with eight runs, four home runs and 10 RBI.

=== Career statistics ===
In his 22-season career, Ott batted .304 with 511 home runs, 1,860 RBI, 1,859 runs, 2,876 hits, 488 doubles, 72 triples, 89 stolen bases, 1,708 BB, .414 on-base percentage and a .533 slugging percentage. Defensively, he recorded a .974 fielding percentage. He hit better than .300 10 times in his major league career. At the time of his retirement, he had hit 200 more home runs than the next-highest National Leaguer.

== Managerial career ==
After longtime teammate Bill Terry retired as manager in 1941, he named Ott as player-manager. Ott continued as a regular player for another five years, and remained productive at the plate for much of that time. In 1942, he led the league in home runs (30), runs scored (118), and walks (109). He finished second in home runs (26) and third in slugging percentage (.544) in 1944. In 1945, he hit .308 and finished tied for fourth in home runs (21).

On the second day of the 1946 season, a day after hitting what would be his final career home run, he injured his knee while diving for a fly ball. The injury effectively ended his career; he only appeared in 29 more games for the rest of 1946, and retired after making only four cameo appearances in 1947. He stayed on as manager until Leo Durocher replaced him midway through the 1948 season.

The Giants' best finish during Ott's tenure was third place in 1942, one of only three times he finished with a winning record. However, his 1943 and 1944 teams were decimated by World War II, which saw a number of established players drafted into the military.

It was in reference to Ott's supposedly easy-going managing style that then-Dodgers manager Durocher made the oft-quoted and somewhat out-of-context comment, "Nice guys finish last!" Ott was the first manager to be ejected from both games of a doubleheader, when the Giants lost both games to the Pittsburgh Pirates on June 9, 1946.

Ott spent the remaining two-and-a-half years of his contract helping his former teammate Carl Hubbell run the Giants' farm system. In 1951, Ott succeeded Chuck Dressen as manager of the Oakland Oaks of the Pacific Coast League, leading the club to an 80–88 record and seventh-place finish. In 1952, the Oaks finished 104–76 under Ott, good for second place in the PCL.

== MLB honors ==
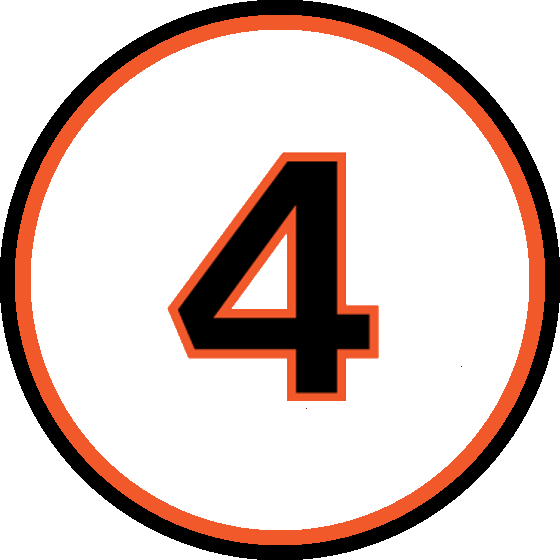
Mel Ott's number 4 was retired by the New York Giants in 1949.

Ott was elected to the Baseball Hall of Fame in 1951 with 87.2% of the vote. His number "4" was also retired by the Giants in 1949, and it is posted on the facade of the upper deck in the left field corner of Oracle Park.

He was a National League All-Star for 12 consecutive seasons, from 1934 through 1945 (All-Star selections only began in 1933; Ott had at least three All-Star caliber seasons prior to that, as well as in 1945, when MLB cancelled the 1945 contest and selections).

He is one of only six National League players to spend a 20+ year career with one team (Cap Anson, Stan Musial, Willie Stargell, Tony Gwynn, and Craig Biggio being the others). Ott shares the record with Musial for most seasons spent entirely with one team in the National League with 22.

In 1999, Ott was a nominee for the Major League Baseball All-Century Team. That same year, The Sporting News placed Ott at number 42 on its list of "Baseball's 100 Greatest Players". In 2020, The Athletic ranked Ott at number 32 on its "Baseball 100" list, compiled by sportswriter Joe Posnanski.

== Broadcasting career ==
Ott (left) in the broadcast booth with Van Patrick, 1957

Ott spent the 1953 and 1954 seasons out of baseball for the first time since coming to New York in 1925. In 1955, he joined the Mutual radio network to recreate baseball games. From 1956 to 1958, Ott teamed with Van Patrick to broadcast the games of the Detroit Tigers on radio and television.

== Death ==
Ott and his wife, Mildred, were injured in an auto accident in Bay Saint Louis, Mississippi, on November 14, 1958. He was transferred to Touro Infirmary in New Orleans, where he died a week later at the age of 49; Mrs. Ott also succumbed to her injruies. He was interred in Metairie Cemetery. Ott died in a similar manner to two other New York Giants Hall of Famers: Frankie Frisch in 1973 and Carl Hubbell in 1988, both of whom had been teammates with Ott (Frisch in Ott's rookie season in 1926 and Hubbell for his entire career from 1928 to 1943).

== Legacy ==
Ott is remembered in his hometown of Gretna, where a park is named in his honor. Since 1959, the National League has honored the league's annual home run champion with the Mel Ott Award. In the 1989 film Field of Dreams, Ott was one of several deceased players portrayed in farmer Ray Kinsella's Iowa cornfield. In 2006, Ott was featured on a United States postage stamp, as one of a block of four honoring "Baseball Sluggers" — the others being Mickey Mantle, Hank Greenberg, and Roy Campanella. In announcing the stamps, the U.S. Postal Service stated, "Remembered as powerful hitters who wowed fans with awesome and often record-breaking home runs, these four men were also versatile players who helped to lead their teams to victory and set impressive standards for subsequent generations." Ott is also remembered in the name of the Little League of Amherst, New York. The Mel Ott Little League began in 1959, named for Ott soon after his death.

Mel Ott Park in Gretna hosts numerous high school and youth baseball games every season.

Ott's name frequently appears in crossword puzzles, on account of its letter combination and brevity.

Ott is mentioned in the poem "Line-Up for Yesterday" by Ogden Nash, first published in Sport magazine in January 1949:

O is for Ott
Of the restless right foot.
When he leaned on the pellet,
The pellet stayed put.

Ott is mentioned in Frank D. Gilroy's 1964 Pulitzer Prize-winning play “The Subject was Roses” near the beginning of Act 1, Scene 2, when John and Timmy have just returned home from a 1946 Giants vs. Cubs game.

JOHN: What'll we drink to?

TIMMY: The Chicago Cubs.

JOHN: Think it'll help them?

TIMMY: Can it hurt?

JOHN: To the Cubs.

TIMMY: To the Cubs.

JOHN: Sixteen to three.

TIMMY: I'm still glad we went.

JOHN: So am I. That was a beautiful catch Ott made.

TIMMY: Yes.

JOHN: For a moment I thought he lost it in the sun.

== See also ==
- Major League Baseball titles leaders
- List of Major League Baseball annual runs batted in leaders
- List of Major League Baseball annual home run leaders
- List of Major League Baseball annual runs scored leaders
- List of Major League Baseball career home run leaders
- List of Major League Baseball career hits leaders
- List of Major League Baseball career doubles leaders
- List of Major League Baseball career runs scored leaders
- List of Major League Baseball career runs batted in leaders
- List of Major League Baseball career total bases leaders
- List of Major League Baseball players to hit for the cycle
- List of Major League Baseball player-managers
- List of Major League Baseball players who spent their entire career with one franchise
- List of baseball players who went directly to Major League Baseball

== Notes ==
Achievements
Preceded by Bob Meusel	Hitting for the cycle May 16, 1929	Succeeded by Ski Melillo
