= 1955 Baseball Hall of Fame balloting =

Elections to the Baseball Hall of Fame

National Baseball

Hall of Fame and Museum
- New inductees: 6
- via BBWAA: 4
- via Veterans Committee: 2
- Total inductees: 79
- Induction date: July 25, 1955

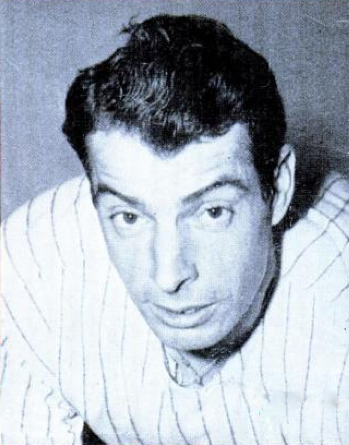
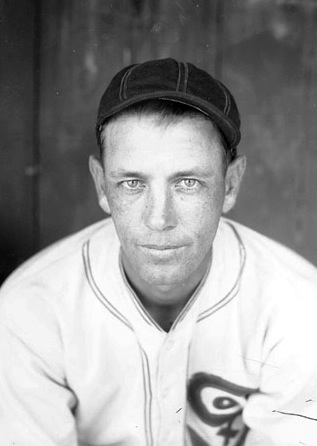
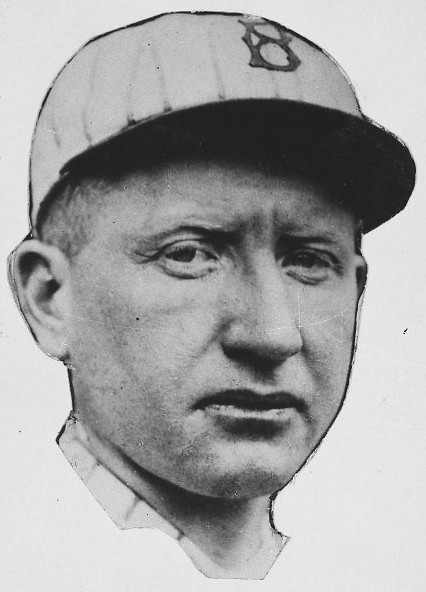
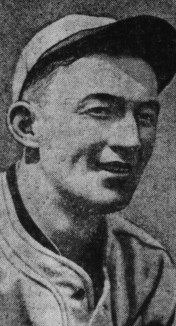
1955 BBWAA inductees (L-R): Joe DiMaggio, Ted Lyons, Dazzy Vance, and Gabby Hartnett

Elections to the Baseball Hall of Fame for 1955 followed a system established for odd-number years in 1953. The eligibility of retired players was extended; previously, a player could not be on the BBWAA ballot if he had retired more than 25 years prior. The ballot could now include those who had been retired for up to 30 years.

The Baseball Writers' Association of America (BBWAA) voted by mail to select from recent major league players and elected four: Joe DiMaggio, Gabby Hartnett, Ted Lyons, and Dazzy Vance. The Veterans Committee met in closed sessions to consider executives, managers, umpires, and earlier players. It selected two players, Frank Baker and Ray Schalk. A formal induction ceremony was held in Cooperstown, New York, on July 25, 1955, with Commissioner of Baseball Ford Frick presiding.

== BBWAA election ==
The BBWAA was authorized to elect players active in 1925 or later, but not after 1949. All 10-year members of the BBWAA were eligible to vote.

Any candidate receiving votes on at least 75% of the ballots would be honored with induction to the Hall. Votes were cast for 65 players; a total of 251 ballots were cast, with 189 votes required for election. A total of 2,391 individual votes were cast, an average of 9.53 per ballot. For the third time, the election produced at least four inductees, a feat that would not be repeated for another 60 years, in 2015.

The four candidates who received 75% of the vote and were elected are indicated in bold italics; candidates who have since been elected in subsequent elections are indicated in italics.

Player	Votes	Percent	Change
**Joe DiMaggio**	223	88.8	▲19.4%
**Ted Lyons**	217	86.5	▲19.0%
**Dazzy Vance**	205	81.7	▲19.0%
**Gabby Hartnett**	195	77.7	▲17.8%
Hank Greenberg	157	62.5	▲24.0%
Joe Cronin	135	53.8	▲20.1%
Max Carey	119	47.4	▲25.6%
Ray Schalk	113	45.0	▲23.6%
Edd Roush	97	38.6	▲18.0%
Hank Gowdy	90	35.9	▲15.7%
Hack Wilson	81	32.3	▲13.3%
Lefty Gomez	71	28.3	▲13.2%
Tony Lazzeri	66	26.3	▲14.4%
Red Ruffing	60	23.9	▲12.4%
Zack Wheat	51	20.3	▲7.2%
Ross Youngs	48	19.1	▲5.6%
Kiki Cuyler	35	13.9	▲6.0%
Rube Marquard	35	13.9	▲7.9%
Duffy Lewis	34	13.5	▲5.6%
Waite Hoyt	33	13.1	▲7.5%
Sam Rice	28	11.2	▲7.6%
Red Faber	27	10.8	▲6.0%
Jim Bottomley	26	10.4	▲4.1%
Dickey Kerr	25	10.0	▲4.8%
Chuck Klein	25	10.0	▲5.6%
Babe Adams	24	9.6	▲4.4%
Dave Bancroft	19	7.6	▲3.6%
Jimmie Wilson	13	5.2	▲2.0%
Wilbur Cooper	11	4.4	▲1.6%
Muddy Ruel	11	4.4	▲2.4%
Jesse Haines	10	4.0	▲1.6%
Howard Ehmke	8	3.2	▲1.6%
Eppa Rixey	8	3.2	▲1.2%
Everett Scott	8	3.2	▲1.6%
Goose Goslin	7	2.8	▲2.4%
Art Nehf	7	2.8	Steady
Clyde Milan	6	2.4	▲1.2%
Heinie Groh	5	2.0	▲1.6%
Babe Herman	5	2.0	▲1.6%
Travis Jackson	5	2.0	▲1.6%
Bill Wambsganss	5	2.0	▲0.4%
Chick Hafey	4	1.6	▲0.8%
Arky Vaughan	4	1.6	▲0.8%
Glenn Wright	4	1.6	▲1.2%
Luke Appling	3	1.2	-
Burleigh Grimes	3	1.2	-
Cy Williams	3	1.2	▼0.4%
Earl Averill	2	0.8	-
George Earnshaw	2	0.8	-
Joe Judge	2	0.8	-
Bob Meusel	2	0.8	-
Johnny Allen	1	0.4	-
Charlie Berry	1	0.4	-
Max Bishop	1	0.4	-
Earle Combs	1	0.4	-
Jake Daubert	1	0.4	-
Paul Derringer	1	0.4	-
Jimmy Dykes	1	0.4	-
Joe Gordon	1	0.4	-
Mule Haas	1	0.4	-
Sam Jones	1	0.4	-
Roger Peckinpaugh	1	0.4	Steady
Hal Schumacher	1	0.4	-
Joe Sewell	1	0.4	Steady
Bill Sherdel	1	0.4	-

Key to colors
Elected to the Hall. These individuals are also indicated in **bold italics**.
Players who were elected in future elections. These individuals are also indicated in plain italics.

== Voting patterns ==
- When there is an influx of qualified candidates, like there were for many years after the Hall was opened, voters tend to spread their votes out more. Joe DiMaggio's 88.8% is not an aberration of the time, and a player of his caliber would probably receive over 95% if voted on today (Ripken, Gwynn, Henderson, etc.).
- The only player who received at least 15% of the vote and has not, as of 2019, been elected is Hank Gowdy, at 35.9%. Perhaps because of his heroics in the 1914 World Gowdy and World War I, Gowdy had name recognition above and beyond his regular season accomplishments. Gowdy also played during a period when defensive skills were given absolute priority for the catching position. However, as time passed, voters have focused more and more upon total regular season offensive accomplishments. As a result, offensive stars with much lower BBWAA support (e.g. Arky Vaughan and Chuck Klein) received greater respect from subsequent Veterans' Committees.
- Dickie Kerr's 10% vote total is very surprising in retrospect, especially considering his four years in the majors should have made him ineligible. His success is attributed to being one of the "clean" Sox of the 1919 World Series.
