= List of Major League Baseball career total bases leaders =

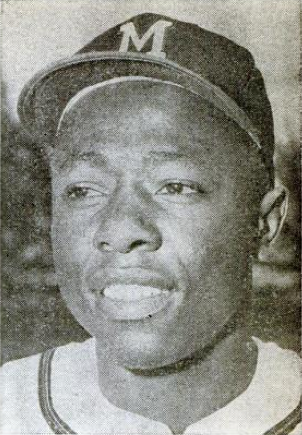
Hank Aaron, the all-time leader in total bases.

In baseball statistics, total bases (TB) is the number of bases a player has gained with hits. It is a weighted sum for which the weight value is 1 for a single, 2 for a double, 3 for a triple, and 4 for a home run. Only bases attained from hits count toward this total. Reaching base by other means (such as a base on balls) or advancing further after the hit (such as on a stolen base) does not increase the player's total bases.

The total bases divided by the number of at bats is the player's slugging average.

Hank Aaron is the career leader in total bases with 6,856. Albert Pujols (6,211), Stan Musial (6,134), and Willie Mays (6,080) are the only other players with at least 6,000 career total bases.

As of September 27, 2026, there are only two active players in the top 100 for career total bases. Los Angeles Dodgers first baseman Freddie Freeman is the active leader in career total bases and 58th overall with 4,394.

== Key ==
**Rank**	Rank amongst leaders in career total bases. A blank field indicates a tie.
**Player (2027 TBs)**	Number of total bases during the 2027 Major League Baseball season
**TB**	Total career total bases
*	Denotes elected to National Baseball Hall of Fame.
**Bold**	Denotes active player. (Note: A player is considered inactive if he has announced his retirement or has not played for a full season.)

== List ==
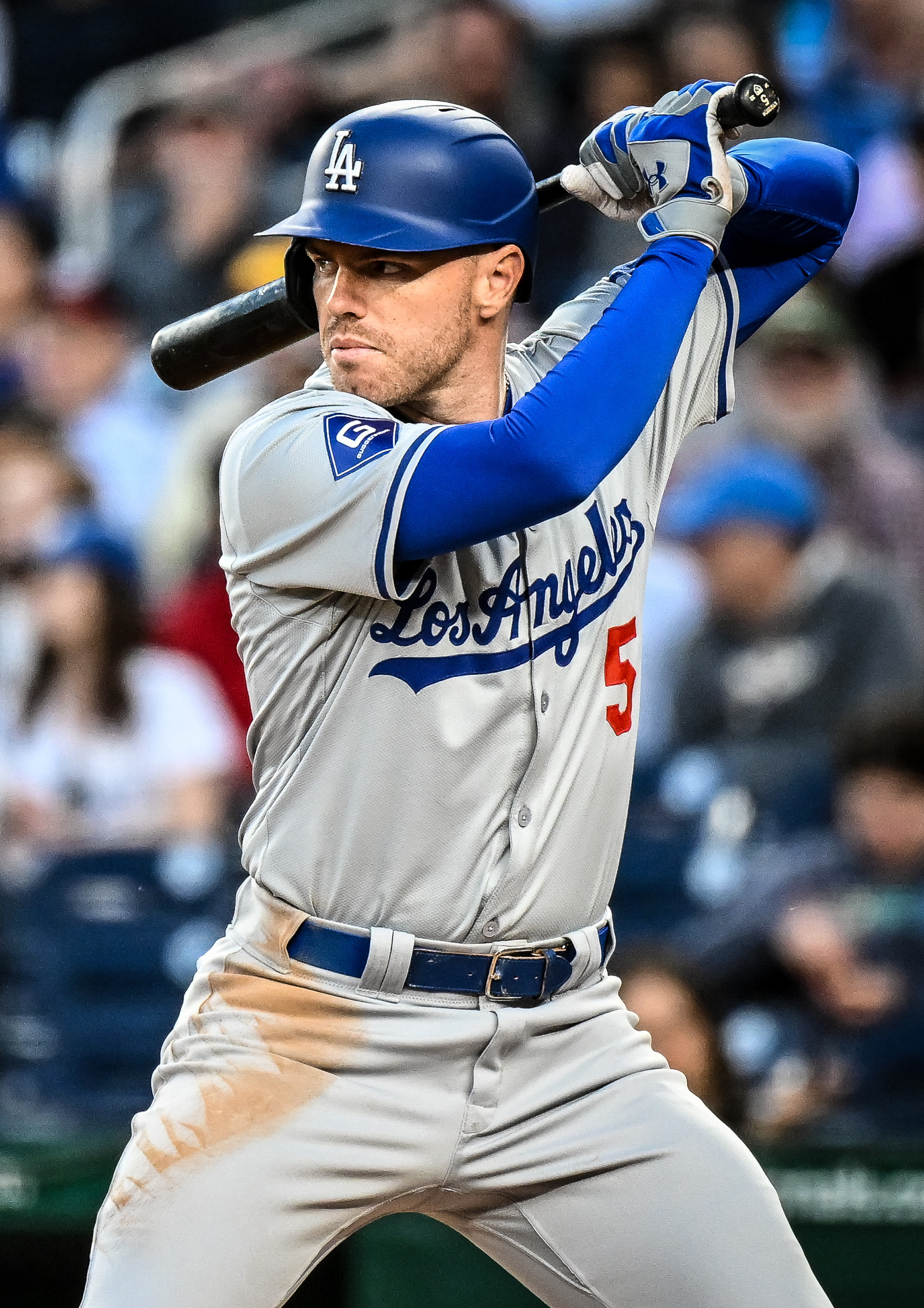
Freddie Freeman, the active leader and 58th all-time in career total bases.

- Stats updated through the 2026 season.

Rank	Player (2027 TBs)	TB
1	Hank Aaron*	6,856
2	Albert Pujols	6,211
3	Stan Musial*	6,134
4	Willie Mays*	6,080
5	Barry Bonds	5,976
6	Ty Cobb*	5,854
7	Alex Rodriguez	5,813
8	Babe Ruth*	5,793
9	Pete Rose	5,752
10	Carl Yastrzemski*	5,539
11	Eddie Murray*	5,397
12	Rafael Palmeiro	5,388
13	Frank Robinson*	5,373
14	Miguel Cabrera	5,368
15	Adrián Beltré*	5,309
16	Ken Griffey Jr.*	5,271
17	Dave Winfield*	5,221
18	Cal Ripken Jr.*	5,168
19	Tris Speaker*	5,101
20	Lou Gehrig*	5,060
21	George Brett*	5,044
22	Mel Ott*	5,041
23	Jimmie Foxx*	4,956
24	Derek Jeter*	4,921
25	Ted Williams*	4,884
26	Honus Wagner*	4,870
27	Paul Molitor*	4,854
28	Al Kaline*	4,852
29	Reggie Jackson*	4,834
30	Manny Ramirez	4,826
31	Andre Dawson*	4,787
32	David Ortiz*	4,765
33	Chipper Jones*	4,755
34	Carlos Beltrán*	4,751
35	Gary Sheffield	4,737
36	Robin Yount*	4,730
37	Rogers Hornsby*	4,712
38	Craig Biggio*	4,711
39	Ernie Banks*	4,706
40	Sammy Sosa	4,704
41	Al Simmons*	4,685
42	Jim Thome*	4,667
43	Harold Baines*	4,604
44	Billy Williams*	4,599
45	Cap Anson*	4,592
46	Rickey Henderson*	4,588
47	Frank Thomas*	4,550
48	Tony Pérez*	4,532
49	Mickey Mantle*	4,511
50	Vladimir Guerrero*	4,506

Rank	Player (2027 TBs)	TB
51	Roberto Clemente*	4,492
52	Paul Waner*	4,478
53	Nap Lajoie*	4,472
54	Fred McGriff*	4,458
55	Iván Rodríguez*	4,451
56	Dave Parker*	4,405
57	Mike Schmidt*	4,404
58	**Freddie Freeman (0)**	4,394
59	Luis Gonzalez	4,385
60	Eddie Mathews*	4,349
61	Sam Crawford*	4,328
62	Goose Goslin*	4,325
63	Todd Helton*	4,292
64	Robinson Canó	4,282
65	Brooks Robinson*	4,270
66	Eddie Collins*	4,268
67	Vada Pinson	4,264
68	Tony Gwynn*	4,259
69	Charlie Gehringer*	4,257
70	Jeff Kent*	4,246
71	Lou Brock*	4,238
72	Dwight Evans	4,230
73	Willie McCovey*	4,219
74	Johnny Damon	4,214
75	Jeff Bagwell*	4,213
76	Willie Stargell*	4,190
77	Rusty Staub	4,185
78	Jake Beckley*	4,160
79	Steve Finley	4,157
80	Harmon Killebrew*	4,143
81	Jim Rice*	4,129
82	Zack Wheat*	4,100
83	Torii Hunter	4,087
84	Paul Konerko	4,083
	Al Oliver	4,083
86	Wade Boggs*	4,064
87	Harry Heilmann*	4,053
88	Andrés Galarraga	4,038
89	Bobby Abreu	4,026
90	Roberto Alomar*	4,018
91	Aramis Ramírez	4,004
92	Carlton Fisk*	3,999
93	Rod Carew*	3,998
94	Ichiro Suzuki*	3,994
95	**Paul Goldschmidt (0)**	3,987
96	Garret Anderson	3,984
97	Carlos Delgado	3,976
98	Joe Morgan*	3,962
99	Orlando Cepeda*	3,959
100	Sam Rice*	3,955

== General references ==
- Baseball's Top 100: The Game's Greatest Records, page 32
- 10 Hank Aaron numbers that aren't 715
