= Line-Up for Yesterday =

1949 poem by Ogden Nash

"Line-Up for Yesterday: An ABC of Baseball Immortals" is a poem written by Ogden Nash for the January 1949 issue of Sport. In the poem, Nash dedicates each letter of the alphabet to a legendary Major League Baseball player. The poem pays tribute to 24 players altogether, plus one winking reference to himself (under "I") as a fan of the game, and concludes with a final stanza in homage to the players collectively.

== Baseball players referred to in the poem ==
- Grover Cleveland Alexander
- Roger Bresnahan
- Ty Cobb
- Dizzy Dean
- Johnny Evers
- Frankie Frisch
- Lou Gehrig
- Rogers Hornsby
- Carl Hubbell
- Walter Johnson
- Willie Keeler
- Nap Lajoie
- Christy Mathewson
- Bobo Newsom
- Mel Ott
- Eddie Plank
- Connie Mack
- Babe Ruth
- Tris Speaker
- Bill Terry
- Dazzy Vance
- Honus Wagner
- Jimmie Foxx
- Cy Young

== Statistics ==
- Eighteen of the players were also in the Hall of Fame at the time, and all but one (Bobo Newsom) would eventually be inducted.
- Eight players—Cobb, Gehrig, Hornsby, Johnson, Mathewson, Ruth, Wagner, and Young—would be elected to the All Century Team in 1999.
