= Ray Schalk =

American baseball player and coach (1892–1970)

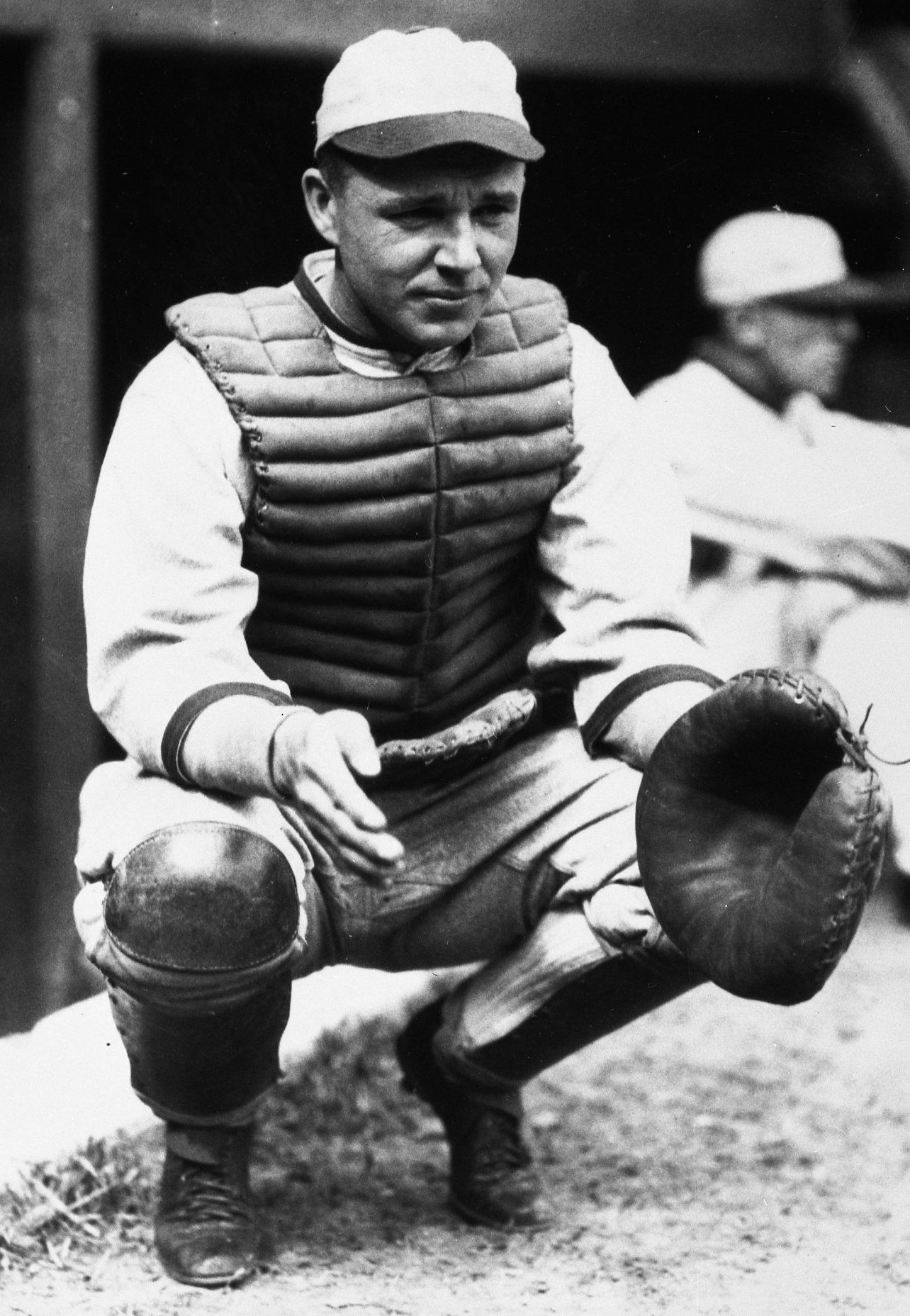
- Schalk with the Chicago White Sox in 1920
- Catcher / Manager
- Born: August 12, 1892; Harvel, Illinois, U.S.
- Died: May 19, 1970 (aged 77); Chicago, Illinois, U.S.
- Batted: Right Threw: Right

MLB debut
- August 11, 1912, for the Chicago White Sox

Last MLB appearance
- September 15, 1929, for the New York Giants

MLB statistics
- Batting average: .253
- Home runs: 11
- Runs batted in: 594
- Managerial record: 102–125
- Winning %: .449
- Stats at Baseball Reference
- Managerial record at Baseball Reference

Teams
- As player: Chicago White Sox (1912–1928); New York Giants (1929); As manager: Chicago White Sox (1927–1928)

Career highlights and awards
- World Series champion (1917)

Member of the National

Baseball Hall of Fame
- Induction: 1955
- Election method: Veterans Committee

Raymond William Schalk (August 12, 1892 – May 19, 1970) was an American professional baseball player, coach, manager and scout. He played as a catcher in Major League Baseball for the Chicago White Sox for the majority of his career. Known for his fine handling of pitchers and outstanding defensive ability, Schalk was considered the greatest defensive catcher of his era. He revolutionized the way the catching position was played by using his speed and agility to expand the previously accepted defensive capabilities for his position. Schalk was elected to the Baseball Hall of Fame in 1955.

== Early life ==
Born in Harvel, Illinois to German immigrant parents, Schalk grew up in Litchfield, Illinois. He dropped out of high school to enter the printer's trade, learning to operate a linotype machine. When career advancement proved difficult in that trade, and after excelling in local baseball games, he began to play professional baseball.

== Baseball career ==
By the age of 18 in 1911, Schalk split time between the Class D Taylorville Christians in the Illinois–Missouri League, where he hit .387, and the Class A Milwaukee Brewers of the American Association. In 1912, he posted a .271 batting average in 80 games for Milwaukee and attracted the attention of the Chicago White Sox because of his aggressive approach to the catching position. The White Sox purchased his contract from the Brewers for $10,000 and two other players.

Schalk made his major league debut the day before his twentieth birthday on August 11, 1912. He appeared in 23 games that season, batting .286, but it was his defense behind the plate that impressed the most. White Sox coach Kid Gleason helped him hone his skills, and by the following year Schalk had become the starting catcher in place of Billy Sullivan and led the American League catchers in putouts.

He soon developed a reputation as one of the best defensive catchers in major league baseball. Before Schalk, most catchers were large and slow of foot. Schalk was a small, agile man, he was only 5 feet 9 inches (1.75 m) tall, who caught with the energy and mobility of a fifth infielder. Due to his small size and youthful appearance, he was often the butt of jokes from opposing players. One time, a policeman refused to let him into the locker room at Comiskey Park, mistaking Schalk for a child.

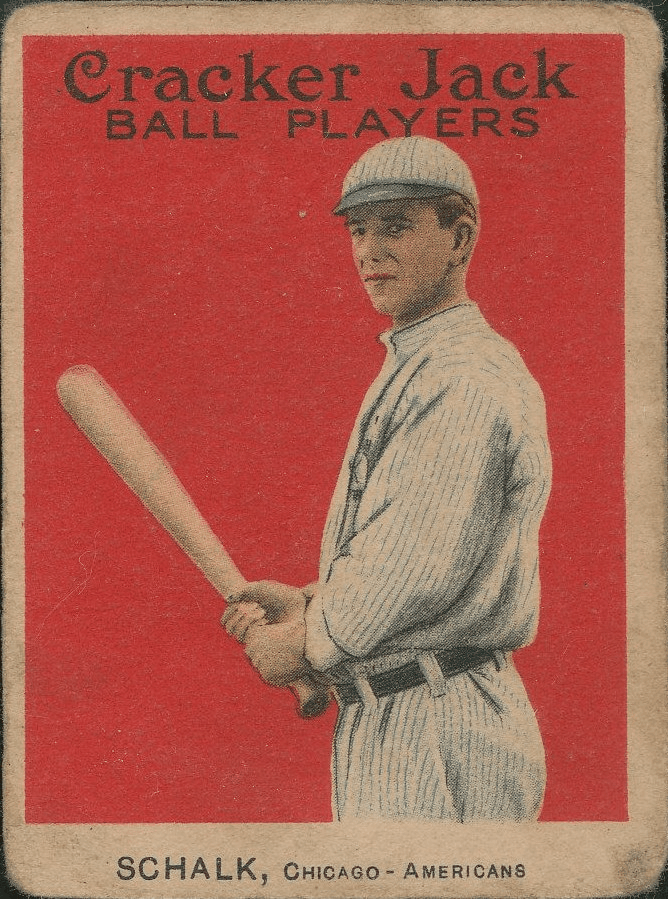
1914 E145-1 Cracker Jack baseball card

In 1914, he batted .270 in 136 games and once again led the league in putouts by a catcher. Despite the White Sox's sixth-place finish, he ranked sixth in voting for the 1914 American League Most Valuable Player Award. He continued to improve in 1915, batting .266 with a .366 on-base percentage and leading American League catchers in fielding percentage, caught stealing percentage, and putouts as the White Sox rose to third place.

In 1916, Schalk had a career-high 30 stolen bases (a record for a catcher until John Wathan broke it in 1982) and led the league in fielding percentage, putouts, assists, and range factor as the White Sox finished in second place, only two games behind the Boston Red Sox. His pitch-calling skills were evident as he guided the White Sox pitching staff to the lowest earned run average in the league.

He batted only .226 in 1917, but his on-base percentage was .331 and he led all American League catchers in putouts for a fifth consecutive year. He once again guided the White Sox pitching staff to the lowest earned run average in the league as they won 100 games to win the American League pennant by 9 games over the Boston Red Sox and went on to defeat John McGraw's New York Giants in the 1917 World Series four games to two for their last world championship until 2005.

In 1918, he recorded his first putout at second base against the St. Louis Browns. On a hit and run play, the Browns' Ray Demmitt ran past second base as Shoeless Joe Jackson made a catch in deep left field off the bat of Joe Gedeon. Schalk, in the middle of the diamond, ran to second base to take the relay from White Sox shortstop Swede Risberg and tagged Demmitt out. The White Sox fell to sixth place in the 1918 season, however, as Schalk batted only .219.

They rebounded in 1919 to recapture the American League pennant, with Schalk hitting a career-high .282 and leading the league in putouts for a seventh consecutive season. The 1919 World Series, which the White Sox lost to the Cincinnati Reds, was shrouded in a controversy which became known as the Black Sox Scandal. Several White Sox players were accused of intentionally throwing games. This was in sharp contrast to Schalk; it is said that Schalk's reputation as an honest and honorable man led the gamblers not even to consider approaching him. Schalk played to win, hitting for a Series .304 batting average and did not face punishment in the wake of the scandal. He told investigators he knew something was wrong when pitchers Eddie Cicotte and Lefty Williams did not throw the pitches he had called for. The White Sox lost the series five games to three, and eight of their players were banned for life from major league baseball as complicit in the scandal, though not Schalk. Years later, Schalk said that the conspirators caught a break when one of the "Clean Sox," pitcher Red Faber, was forced to sit out the Series with the flu. Schalk believed that had Faber been available, there would have never been a fix since Faber would have likely gotten starts that went to Cicotte and Williams.

He had another good year in 1920, hitting .270 with a .362 on-base percentage and a career-high 61 runs batted in. He led the American League for an eighth consecutive year in putouts as the White Sox finished in second place. The 1922 season was one of his finest. On April 30, 1922, he caught Charlie Robertson's perfect game against the Detroit Tigers, the last perfect game in the major leagues until Don Larsen's in the 1956 World Series. Two months later, on June 27, he hit for the cycle. He ended the season with a .281 average, hit 4 home runs and drove in 60 runs. He led the league in putouts, and tied the American League record for fielding percentage for a catcher at .989. He finished third in voting for the 1922 American League's Most Valuable Player Award.

Schalk, circa 1926

By 1924, the wear and tear of catching began to catch up with him. He had played in 100 games or more in 11 consecutive seasons, but injured three fingers on his throwing hand which limited him to 57 games and a career-low .197 batting average in 1924. He rebounded in 1925 to play in 125 games, bat .274 with a career-high .382 on-base percentage, and lead the league in baserunners caught stealing. In November 1926, he succeeded Eddie Collins as the White Sox player-manager at the age of 33. His playing time diminished in 1927, as he appeared in only 16 games while concentrating on managing the team. Over the two seasons he played and managed, he won 102 and lost 125 for a .449 won-lost percentage. He then had a salary disagreement with team owner Charles Comiskey, and left the White Sox to become a player-coach with the New York Giants in 1929, but appeared in only five games before retiring as a player at the age of 36.

== Managerial record ==
Team	Year	Regular season					Postseason			
Team	Year	Games	Won	Lost	Win %	Finish	Won	Lost	Win %	Result
CWS	1927	153	70	83	.458	5th in AL	–	–	–	–
CWS	1928	74	32	42	.432	resigned	–	–	–	–
Total		227	102	125	.449		0	0	–	

== Career statistics and legacy ==
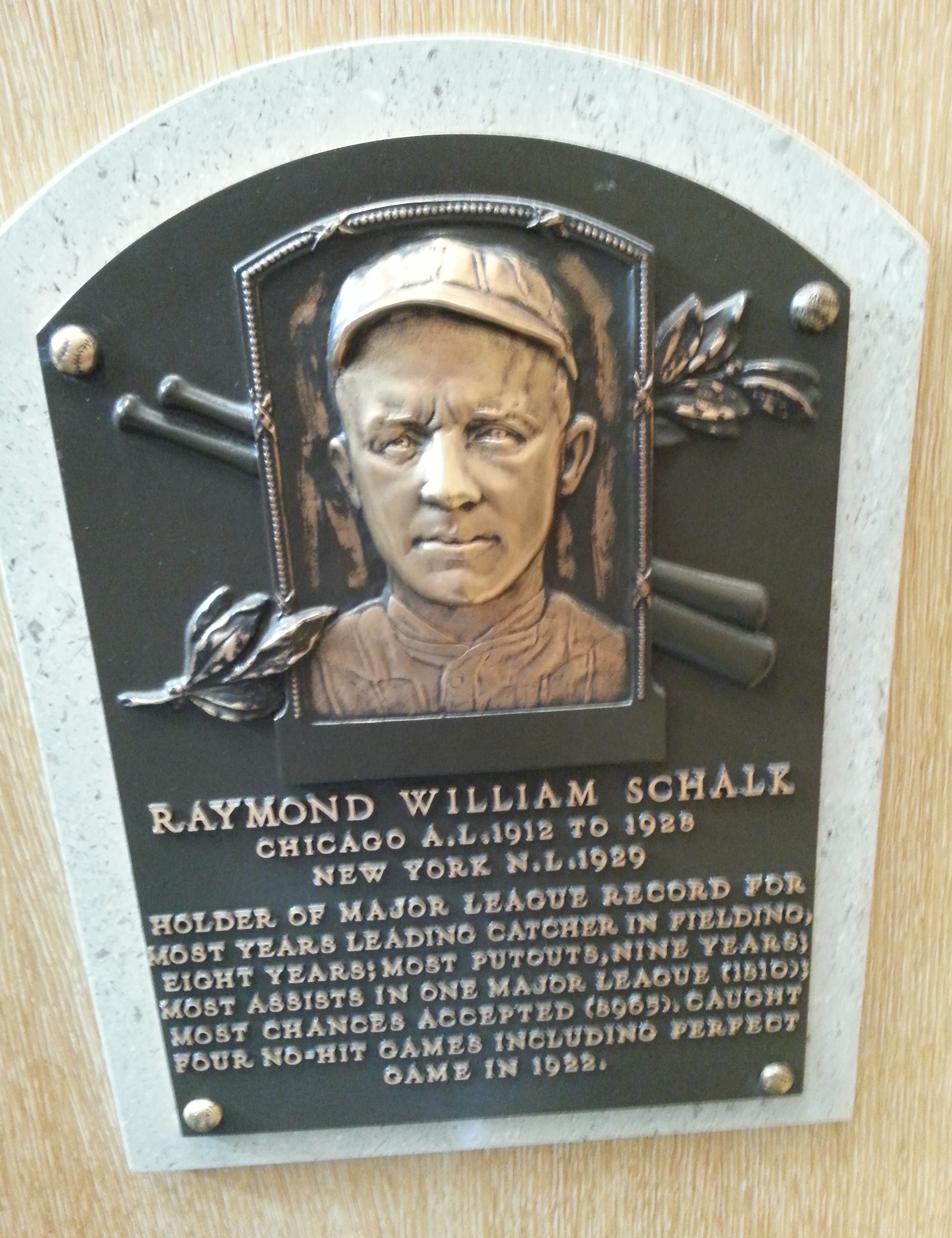
Schalk's plaque at the National Baseball Hall of Fame and Museum

In an 18-year major league career, Schalk played in 1,762 games, accumulating 1,345 hits in 5,306 at bats for a .253 career batting average along with 11 home runs, 594 runs batted in, 579 runs, 177 stolen bases, an on-base percentage of .340 and a .981 fielding percentage. He established himself as one of the American League's outstanding defensive catchers by leading AL catchers in fielding percentage eight times, putouts nine times, double plays four times and assists twice. He set major league catching records for putouts, and still holds the major league career record for double plays (217) and the American League career mark for assists. No catcher has approached Schalk's record for career double plays, and none has led the league in fielding percentage eight times. He held the record for most no-hitters caught (four), until a scoring change in 1991 eliminated one of them that was broken up in extra innings. Schalk's 51.32% career caught stealing percentage ranks eighth all-time among major league catchers. He caught 144 shutouts in his career, ranking third all-time among catchers behind Yogi Berra and Carlton Fisk.

Schalk set standards for longevity for catchers, catching 100 or more games for 11 straight seasons. His major league record of 1,726 games caught stood until 1945 when it was broken by Rick Ferrell. He also established himself as one of the finest baserunning catchers, setting a single-season stolen base record for the position in 1916 with 30, which stood until John Wathan stole 36 bases in 1982.

Schalk helped revolutionize the way the catcher's position was played. He is credited with being the first catcher to back up infield throws to first base and outfield throws to third base. He claimed to be the only major league catcher to have made a putout at every base, and once made three assists in one inning. He also became known for his handling of the White Sox pitching staff and his pitch-calling skills. His reputation as a defensive standout is enhanced due to the era in which he played: in the deadball era, catchers played a much greater defensive role than subsequently, given the large number of bunts and stolen base attempts, as well as the difficulty of handling the spitball pitchers who dominated pitching staffs. He had to catch every type of pitch imaginable, including shine balls, spitballs, knuckleballs and emory balls from pitchers such as Ed Walsh, Eddie Cicotte, Dickie Kerr, Urban Faber, and Ted Lyons.

Schalk's career batting average of .253 is the lowest of any position player in the Hall of Fame. That he was selected by the Veterans Committee for enshrinement in 1955 is largely a tribute to his outstanding defensive skills and to the fact that he played to win the infamous 1919 World Series for the White Sox.

Schalk and pitcher Red Faber started 306 games as a battery, fourth-most of any such duo since 1900.

== Post-playing career ==
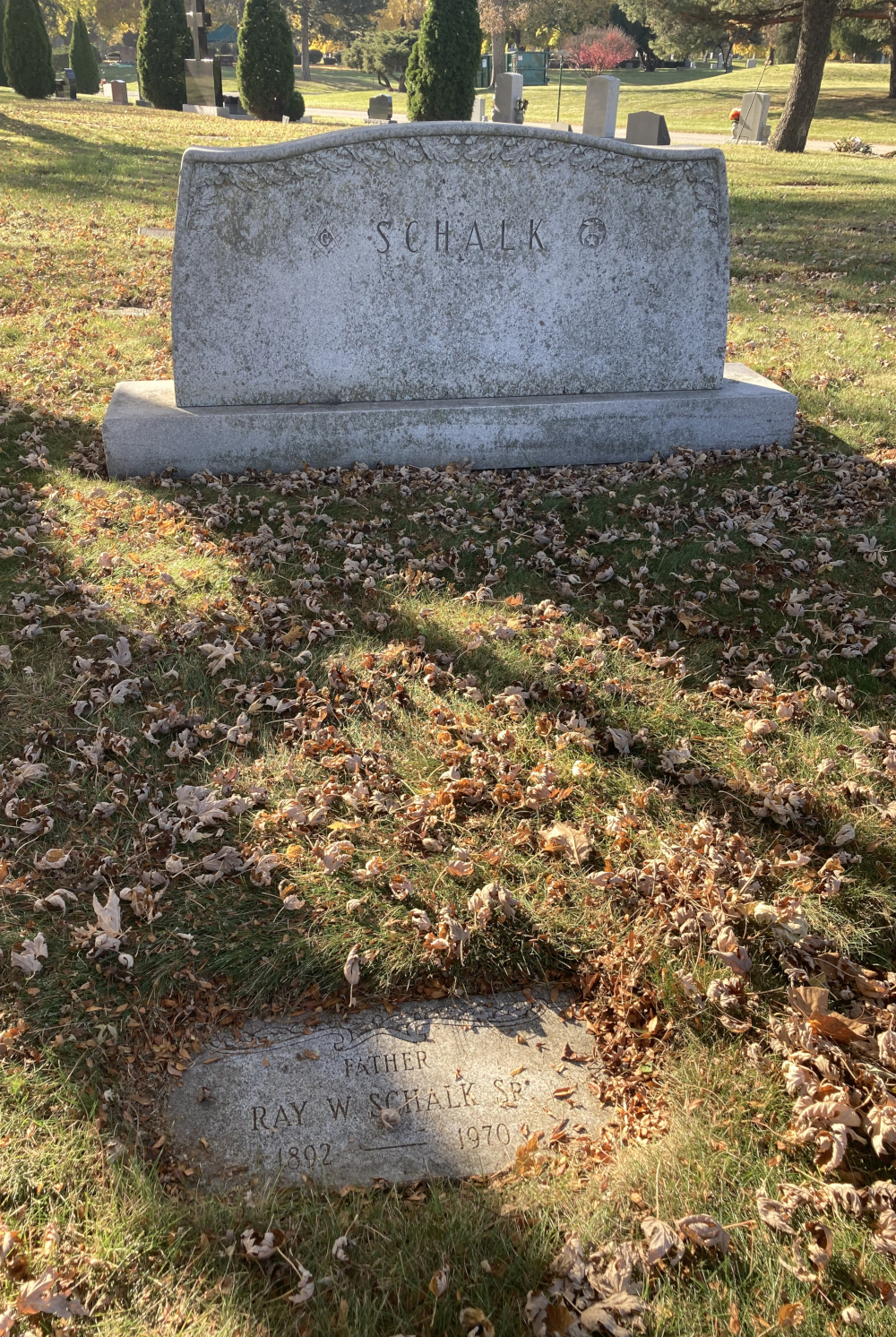
Schalk's grave at Evergreen Cemetery

Schalk became a coach for the Chicago Cubs in 1930 and 1931 and then managed the Buffalo Bisons in the Double-A International League from 1932 to 1937. He also managed the Indianapolis Indians, the Oklahoma City Indians, and the Milwaukee Brewers minor league teams. In 1944, he became a scout for the Chicago Cubs. He was an assistant baseball coach at Purdue University for 18 seasons, on the staff of luminaries such as Ward Lambert and Hank Stram. He retired from baseball at 72.

After his retirement as an active MLB player, Schalk invested in a successful bowling alley located in Evergreen Park, Illinois. He named the business "Schalk's Evergreen Towers". In 1948, Schalk, his wife Lavinia, and 34 others were taken down to the basement, locked inside various rooms, and held hostage inside the bowling alley by 6 armed robbers. After 2 hours of confinement and people passing out from lack of air inside the rooms, several pin-boys were able to knock a door down and free everyone. The robbers were never caught.

In 1955, he was elected to the Baseball Hall of Fame by the Veterans Committee. He was invited to catch the first ball of the 1959 World Series–the White Sox' first appearance in the World Series in 40 years–thrown out by fellow Hall of Fame member and former White Sox pitcher Red Faber.

A museum in Nokomis, Illinois, is dedicated to Schalk and two other Hall of Famers, Jim Bottomley and Red Ruffing. The Little League ball fields in Litchfield, Illinois, near his birthplace of Harvel, are named for him. He died of cancer on May 19, 1970, at the age of 78, and is buried in Evergreen Cemetery in Evergreen Park, Illinois.

== In popular culture ==
Schalk was portrayed by Gordon Clapp in the 1988 film Eight Men Out.

== See also ==
- List of Major League Baseball career stolen bases leaders
- List of Major League Baseball player-managers
- List of players who have hit for the cycle

Preceded by Jimmy Johnston	Hitting for the cycle June 27, 1922	Succeeded by Bob Meusel
