= Dazzy Vance =

American baseball player (1891–1961)

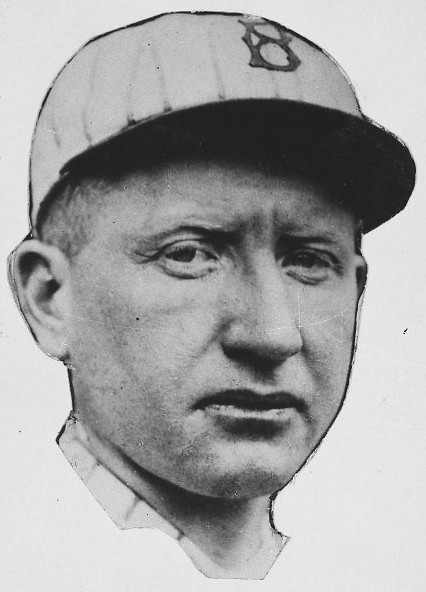
- Vance in 1922
- Pitcher
- Born: March 4, 1891; Orient, Iowa, U.S.
- Died: February 16, 1961 (aged 69); Homosassa Springs, Florida, U.S.
- Batted: Right Threw: Right

MLB debut
- April 16, 1915, for the Pittsburgh Pirates

Last MLB appearance
- August 14, 1935, for the Brooklyn Dodgers

MLB statistics
- Win–loss record: 197–140
- Earned run average: 3.24
- Strikeouts: 2,045
- Stats at Baseball Reference

Teams
- Pittsburgh Pirates (1915); New York Yankees (1915, 1918); Brooklyn Robins / Dodgers (1922–1932); St. Louis Cardinals (1933); Cincinnati Reds (1934); St. Louis Cardinals (1934); Brooklyn Dodgers (1935)

Career highlights and awards
- World Series champion (1934); NL MVP (1924); Triple Crown (1924); 2× MLB wins leader (1924, 1925); 3× NL ERA leader (1924, 1928, 1930); 7× NL strikeout leader (1922–1928); Pitched a no-hitter on September 13, 1925

Member of the National

Baseball Hall of Fame
- Induction: 1955
- Vote: 81.7% (16th ballot)

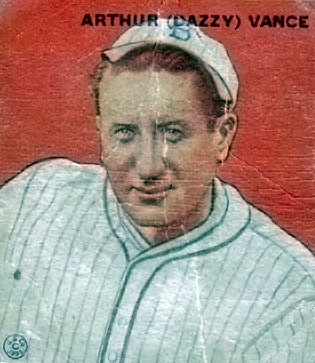
1933 Goudey Baseball Card of Dazzy Vance #2

Charles Arthur "Dazzy" Vance (March 4, 1891 – February 16, 1961) was an American professional baseball player. He played as a pitcher for five different franchises in Major League Baseball (MLB) in a career that spanned 16 seasons over 21 years. A late bloomer, Vance pitched his first full season in 1922 at age 31 and, aided by his impressive fastball, became the only pitcher to lead the National League in strikeouts for seven consecutive seasons. Vance was inducted into the Baseball Hall of Fame in 1955.

== Early life ==
Born in Orient, Iowa, Vance spent most of his childhood in Nebraska. He played semipro baseball there, then signed on with a minor league baseball team out of Red Cloud, Nebraska, a member of the Nebraska State League, in 1912. After pitching for two other Nebraska State League teams in 1913 (Superior) and 1914 (Hastings Giants), Vance made a brief major league debut with the Pittsburgh Pirates in 1915 and appeared with the New York Yankees that year as well. However, it took several years before he established himself as a major league player.

Vance was discovered to have an arm injury in 1916 and was given medical treatment. He continued to work on his pitching in the minor leagues, appearing with teams in Columbus, Ohio; Toledo, Ohio; Memphis, Tennessee; Rochester, New York; and Sacramento, California. Vance reappeared in the major leagues only once for the Yankees, pitching two games in 1918. Vance said he was suddenly able to throw hard again in 1921 while pitching for the New Orleans Pelicans of the Southern Association: he struck out 163 batters and finished the season with a 21–11 win–loss record. The Pelicans sold his contract to the Brooklyn Robins in 1922. The Robins wanted to acquire catcher Hank DeBerry, but the Pelicans refused to complete the deal unless Vance was included in the transaction.

== Major league career ==
Vance and DeBerry formed a successful battery during their tenure with Brooklyn. In 1922, Vance produced an 18–12 record with a 3.70 earned run average (ERA) and a league-leading 134 strikeouts. His best individual season came in 1924, when he led the National League in wins (28), strikeouts (262) and ERA (2.16)—the pitching Triple Crown—en route to winning the National League Most Valuable Player Award. Vance set the then-National League record for strikeouts in a nine-inning game when he fanned 15 Chicago Cubs in a game on August 23, 1924. He later struck-out 17 batters in a 10-inning game in 1925.

On September 24, 1924, Vance became the sixth pitcher in major-league history to pitch an immaculate inning, striking out all three batters on nine total pitches in the third inning of a game against the Cubs. He finished the season with 262 strikeouts, more than any two National League pitchers combined (Burleigh Grimes with 135 and Dolf Luque with 86 were second and third respectively). That season, Vance had one out of every 13 strikeouts in the entire National League. Vance pitched a no-hitter on September 13, 1925, against the Philadelphia Phillies, winning 10–1.

Vance was involved in one of the most famous flubs in baseball history, the "three men on third" incident during the 1926 season. With Vance on second and Chick Fewster on first, Babe Herman hit a long ball and began racing around the bases. As Herman rounded second, the third base coach yelled at him to go back, since Fewster had not yet passed third. Vance, having rounded third, misunderstood and reversed course, returning to third. Fewster arrived at third. Herman ignored the instruction and also arrived at third. The third baseman tagged out Herman and Fewster; Vance was declared safe by rule.

Vance's play began to decline in the early 1930s and he bounced to the St. Louis Cardinals (becoming a member of the team known as the Gashouse Gang), Cincinnati Reds and back to the Dodgers. On September 12, 1934, Vance hit his seventh and final major league home run at 43 years and 6 months, the second oldest pitcher to do so to this day. However, just a week later commenting for a newspaper article, Vance said that he did not recommend baseball as a career to young men. Vance pointed out that very few people could make a good living out of it, especially during a time when increasing major league salaries were attracting many college-educated men who would have previously chosen other work.

Vance retired after the 1935 season. He led the league in ERA three times, wins twice, and established a National League record by leading the league in strikeouts in seven consecutive years (1922–1928). Vance retired with a 197–140 record, 2,045 strikeouts and a 3.24 ERA — remarkable numbers considering he saw only 33 innings of big league play during his twenties.

== Later life ==
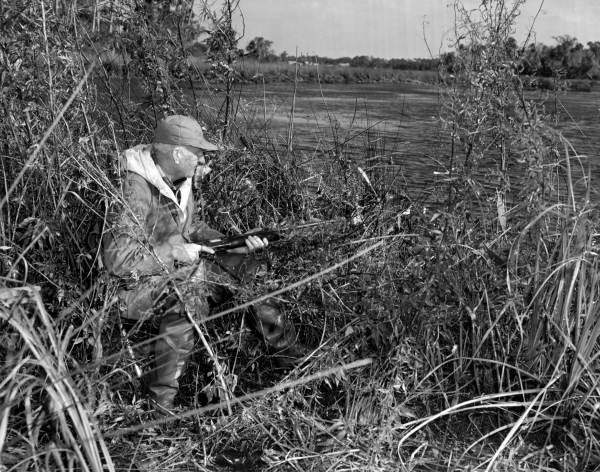
Vance duck hunting in Crystal River, Florida, January 1952

Vance enjoyed hunting and fishing when he retired to Homosassa Springs, Florida, where he had lived since the 1920s. In 1938, Vance became ill with pneumonia. The illness worsened and kept him hospitalized for several months. Vance recovered and became a frequent guest at Brooklyn old-timers games.

Vance was inducted into the Baseball Hall of Fame in 1955. He learned of his election when a highway patrolman got his attention on a local highway and told him that a photographer was at his house. A Dazzy Vance Day celebration was held in Brooklyn. Biographer John Skipper characterized his Hall of Fame induction as "subdued" compared to the celebration in Brooklyn.

Vance died of a heart attack in 1961 in Homosassa Springs. His obituary in The Sporting News said that he had been under a doctor's care but that he was active and thought to be in relatively good health when he died. His survivors included his wife Edyth and a daughter.

== Legacy ==
In 1981, Lawrence Ritter and Donald Honig included him in their book The 100 Greatest Baseball Players of All Time. Vance is mentioned in the 1949 poem "Line-Up for Yesterday" by Ogden Nash:

Line-Up for Yesterday

V is for Vance,
The Dodgers' own Dazzy;
None of his rivals
Could throw as fast as he.

— Ogden Nash, Sport magazine (January 1949)

== See also ==
- List of Major League Baseball annual ERA leaders
- List of Major League Baseball annual strikeout leaders
- List of Major League Baseball annual wins leaders
- List of Major League Baseball career strikeout leaders
- List of Major League Baseball no-hitters
- Major League Baseball titles leaders

== Notes ==
Preceded by Dutch Ruether	Brooklyn Robins Opening Day; Starting pitcher 1925	Succeeded by Jesse Petty
Preceded by Pete Alexander	National League Pitching Triple Crown; 1924	Succeeded by Bucky Walters
Preceded by Jesse Haines	No-hitter pitcher September 13, 1925	Succeeded by Ted Lyons
