= Jimmie Foxx =

American baseball player (1907–1967)

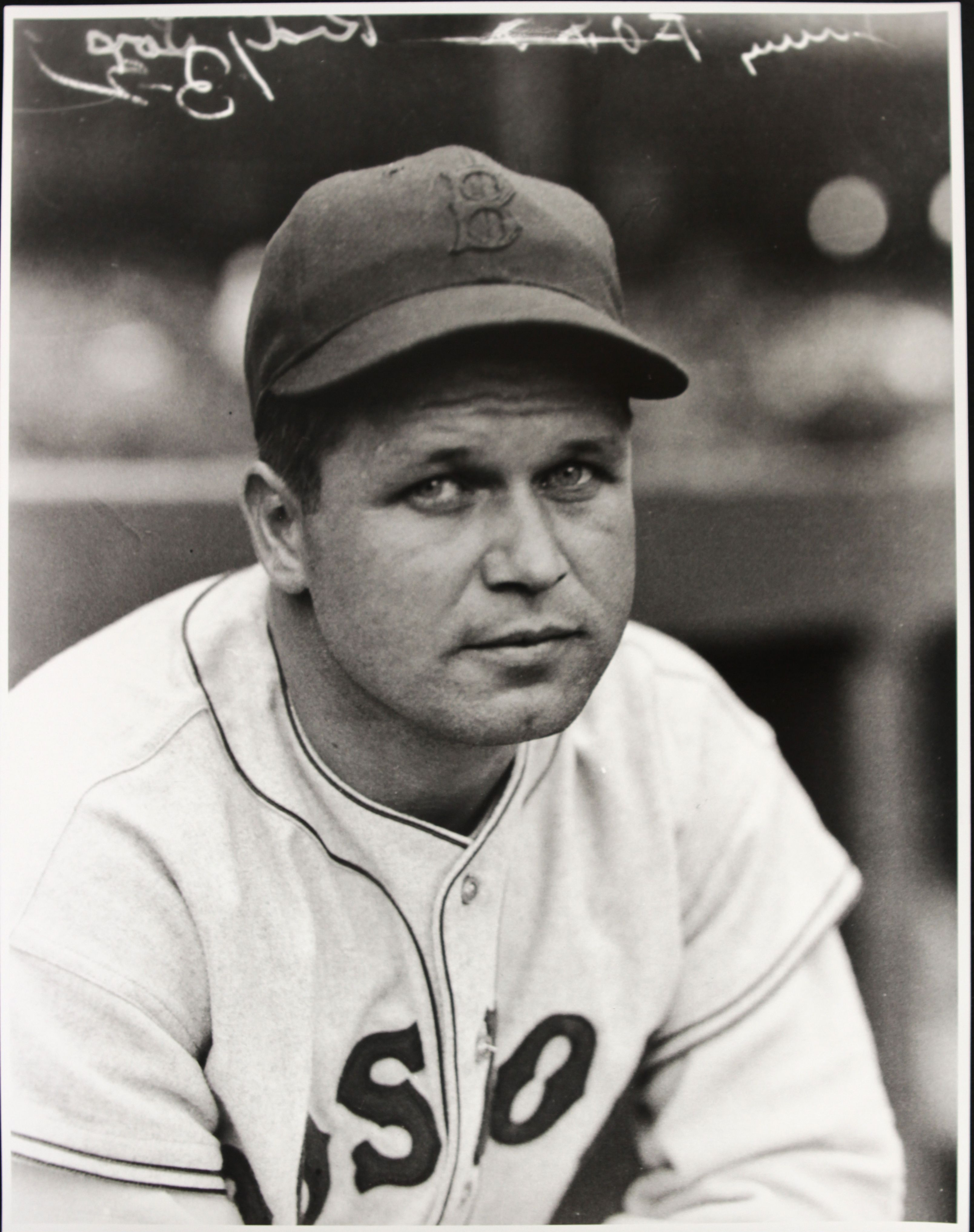
- Foxx with the Boston Red Sox c. 1936–1937
- First baseman
- Born: October 22, 1907; Sudlersville, Maryland, U.S.
- Died: July 21, 1967 (aged 59); Miami, Florida, U.S.
- Batted: Right Threw: Right

MLB debut
- May 1, 1925, for the Philadelphia Athletics

Last MLB appearance
- September 23, 1945, for the Philadelphia Phillies

MLB statistics
- Batting average: .325
- Hits: 2,646
- Home runs: 534
- Runs batted in: 1,922
- Stats at Baseball Reference

Teams
- Philadelphia Athletics (1925–1935); Boston Red Sox (1936–1942); Chicago Cubs (1942, 1944); Philadelphia Phillies (1945)

Career highlights and awards
- 9× All-Star (1933–1941); 2× World Series champion (1929, 1930); 3× AL MVP (1932, 1933, 1938); Triple Crown (1933); 2× AL batting champion (1933, 1938); 4× AL home run leader (1932, 1933, 1935, 1939); 3× AL RBI leader (1932, 1933, 1938); Philadelphia Baseball Wall of Fame; Athletics Hall of Fame; Boston Red Sox Hall of Fame

Member of the National

Baseball Hall of Fame
- Induction: 1951
- Vote: 79.2% (seventh ballot)

James Emory Foxx (October 22, 1907 – July 21, 1967), nicknamed "Double X" and "the Beast", was an American professional baseball first baseman who played 20 seasons in Major League Baseball (MLB) for the Philadelphia Athletics, Boston Red Sox, Chicago Cubs, and Philadelphia Phillies. A tremendous power hitter, Foxx retired with the second most home runs, behind only Babe Ruth, and fifth-most runs batted in (RBI). His greatest seasons were with the Philadelphia Athletics and the Boston Red Sox, where he hit a then-record 30 or more home runs in 12 consecutive seasons and drove in more than 100 runs in 13 consecutive years.

Considered one of the greatest hitters in baseball history, Foxx became the ninth player to win a Triple Crown and set a then-record for most MVP awards with three. His 58 home runs hit in 1932 were third-most all-time in a season at the time, his 438 total bases collected that same season are still fifth most all time, and he is one of only seven batters to accumulate over 400 total bases in a season more than once. Foxx won two American League (AL) batting titles, led all of baseball in home runs four times, and batted over .300 in eleven full seasons. On September 24, 1940, Foxx became the second member of the 500 home run club when he hit a sixth-inning home run off George Caster. For nearly 67 years, he held the record for the youngest major leaguer to reach 500 home runs. His 534 home runs are currently 19th all time, and his 1,922 RBI are tenth all time. With a career batting average of .325 and slugging percentage of .609, he was elected to the National Baseball Hall of Fame in 1951.

== Early years ==
James Emory Foxx was born on October 22, 1907, in rural Sudlersville on the Eastern Shore of Maryland, to tenant farmers Dell and Mattie Foxx. Dell Foxx had played baseball for a town team when he was younger. Jimmie Foxx did well in school but excelled in sports, particularly soccer, track, and baseball. He played all three sports at Sudlersville High School, and set the state record in both the 220 and 80 yard dash in 1923. So great were his athletic exploits he was regarded as "the most promising athletic prospect in the State of Maryland", and a scholarship to the University of Maryland was arranged — in track and field — should he wish to attend. In April 1924, Foxx met with Frank "Home Run" Baker, a former member of Philadelphia Athletics, and then manager of the minor league Class D level Easton Farmers. Baker offered Foxx a contract to play for the Farmers for $100 a month.

Foxx had hoped to pitch or play third base, but since the team was short on catchers, Foxx moved behind the plate, a position he had played in high school and on summer all-star teams. He immediately drew interest from the Philadelphia Athletics (A's) and New York Yankees. In July 1924, A's owner Connie Mack purchased Foxx's contract from the Farmers for $2,000 and Foxx stated that he would finish out the season with Easton before joining the Athletics. He traveled to Philadelphia later in the 1924 season and sat in the dugout during games, and never appeared in one. Foxx, who at this time was a senior in high school, was forbidden by Mack from participating in any school athletics for fear that this might "jeopardize his baseball future." Foxx would drop out of school, and joined the Athletics for spring training in Fort Myers, Florida. As a result, he did not graduate, but he did receive a certificate which designated him an honorary member of the class.

== Professional career ==
=== Philadelphia Athletics (1925–1935) ===
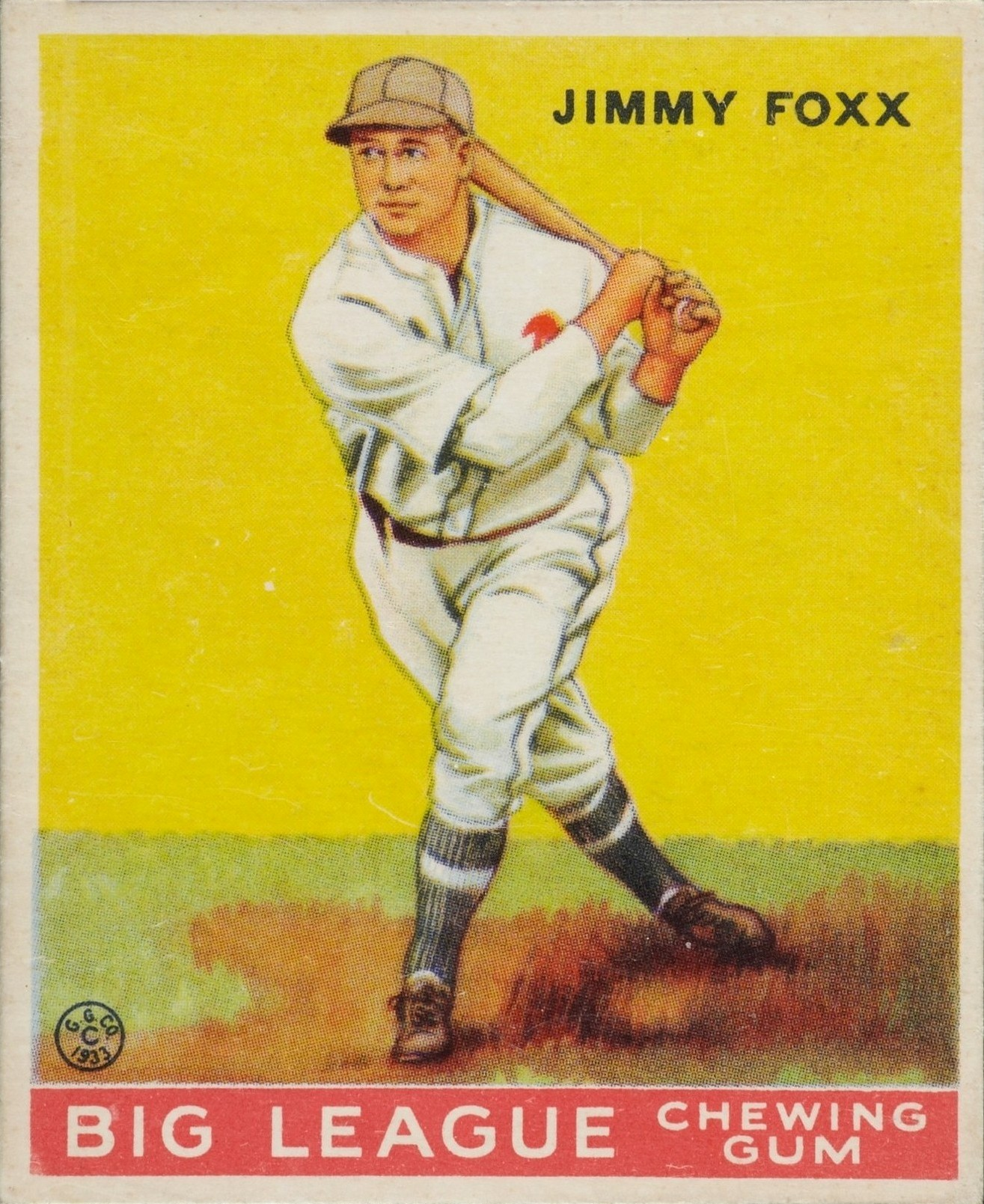
1933 Goudey baseball card

During spring training in 1925, Foxx split duties at catcher with Mickey Cochrane and Cy Perkins, and when the season started he played the role of third-string catcher. On May 1, 1925, in a game against the Washington Senators, he recorded his first career hit off Vean Gregg. In June, Mack optioned Foxx to the Providence Grays to accumulate time and practice hitting at a higher level instead of sitting on the bench in Shibe Park. In the next season, Foxx appeared in a few more games, mostly as a pinch hitter or a replacement catcher. In 1927, Foxx signed a contract for $3,000 (equivalent to $56,359 in 2025); however, because future Baseball Hall of Fame member Mickey Cochrane was still the primary catcher, he remained in a backup role, but had started to transition to first base. He recorded his first home run on May 31, 1927, against Urban Shocker of the New York Yankees, and finished the season batting .323 over 61 games.

In 1929, installed as the A's regular first baseman, Foxx had a breakthrough year. On May 1, he recorded the first 5-hit game of his career as well as the first multi home run game of his career, one of three such games that season. By early July, he was batting over .400 until a slump later in the season caused his average to drop. He finished the year with 20 games where he collected 3 or more hits and finished with a .354 average with 33 home runs. During that year, Foxx appeared on the cover of Time magazine. A strong start to the 1930 season showed that Foxx was a hitter to be feared, and on May 30, he recorded the first six-hit game of his career, against the Senators. By the end of June, after hitting 11 home runs in both May and June, he had 22 on the season and was batting .360. A slow end to the season lowered his season numbers, however, he still hit over 30 home runs for the second time in his career and finished with a .335 batting average. The 1931 season was hampered by injuries and a sinus infection, marking his first season where he did not hit above .300. He still managed to hit 30 home runs, extending his streak to 3 straight seasons.

The 1932 season would be Foxx's first truly outstanding year. In a sign of games to come, he recorded three hits and a home run during his first game, the first of 20 games where he would record three or more hits that season. By the end of May, he had recorded 17 home runs, 49 runs batted in, and had a batting average of .417, leading the American League in every major hitting category. On July 10, Foxx had his first 3 home run game, against the Cleveland Indians, he also collected 6 hits, including a double in an 18-inning game. Although a thumb and wrist injury in August slowed his pace, he still hit 7 home runs and batted .356 over the month. Foxx finished the season strong, hitting over .390 over the last month of the season and collected another 10 home runs, the fourth such month where he reached double digits in home runs hit. At the end of the season, he had amassed 151 runs scored, 213 hits, 58 home runs, 169 RBI, a .364 batting average, and 438 total bases; he led the AL in every major category except hits and batting average. The batting champion that year, Dale Alexander, hit .367 but played in only 124 games. By modern rules that would have disqualified Alexander, and Foxx would have won the Triple Crown with a 15-point lead over the runner up, Lou Gehrig. Even though Foxx actually hit 60 home runs that year, two were hit in games that were rained out, erasing them from the official batting records, causing him to narrowly miss Babe Ruth's Major League record 60 home runs. In October, Foxx would receive 75 out of the maximum 80 possible MVP votes, giving him his first MVP award in his career.

After an uncharacteristically slow start to the 1933 season that saw him hitting only .301 with 7 home runs by June 6, he started hitting home runs again, with his second three home run game against the New York Yankees. During the month of June, he hit 13 home runs, scored 37 runs, and batted over .380 in 31 games played. On August 14, he hit for the cycle and set a then-AL record 9 runs batted in. He would hit multiple home runs in seven games and collect four or more hits in five games. He finished the season leading the American league in home runs, RBI, and batting average, which secured him the ninth Triple Crown in MLB history. He also finished with 403 total bases, leading the American League and making him the second player in history at the time to record 400 total bases in back-to-back seasons, with Lou Gehrig being the first and Todd Helton later becoming the third. As a result of his phenomenal season, he was awarded his second MVP award at the end of the year.

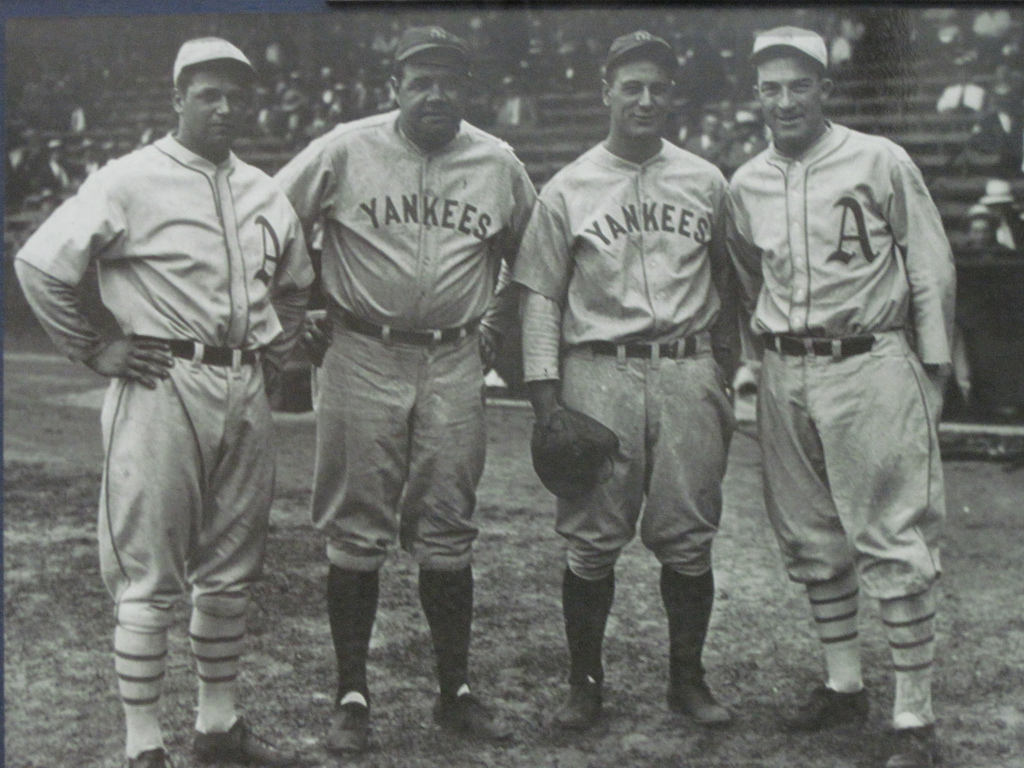
Foxx with Babe Ruth, Lou Gehrig and Al Simmons

His 1934 season saw Foxx continue to terrorize American League pitchers. He finished the season with 44 home runs, 130 runs batted in and a .334 average. While his numbers were down compared to his previous two seasons, he still finished in the top 5 in several batting categories. This also marked the third straight season where he hit 40 or more home runs. At the end of the season, during an exhibition game in Winnipeg, he got hit by a pitch in the head and was knocked unconscious. After the incident, he suffered sinus problems for the rest of his career. In late 1934, Foxx, along with Babe Ruth, Lou Gehrig, Charlie Gehringer, among others, went on a tour of Japan and played 18 games against Japanese teams. The start of the 1935 season saw Foxx return to his original position at catcher because of the loss of Mickey Cochrane to the Detroit Tigers. After poor performance and a series of injuries to the other Athletic infielders, Connie Mack placed Foxx back at first base. Even after finishing the season leading the American League in home runs for the 3rd time and finishing in the top 10 in most batting categories, it was still not enough for the Athletics to finish above last place. Connie Mack sold Foxx to the Boston Red Sox along with Johnny Marcum for $150,000 (equivalent to approximately $3,480,216 in 2025 dollars).

=== Boston Red Sox (1936–1942) ===
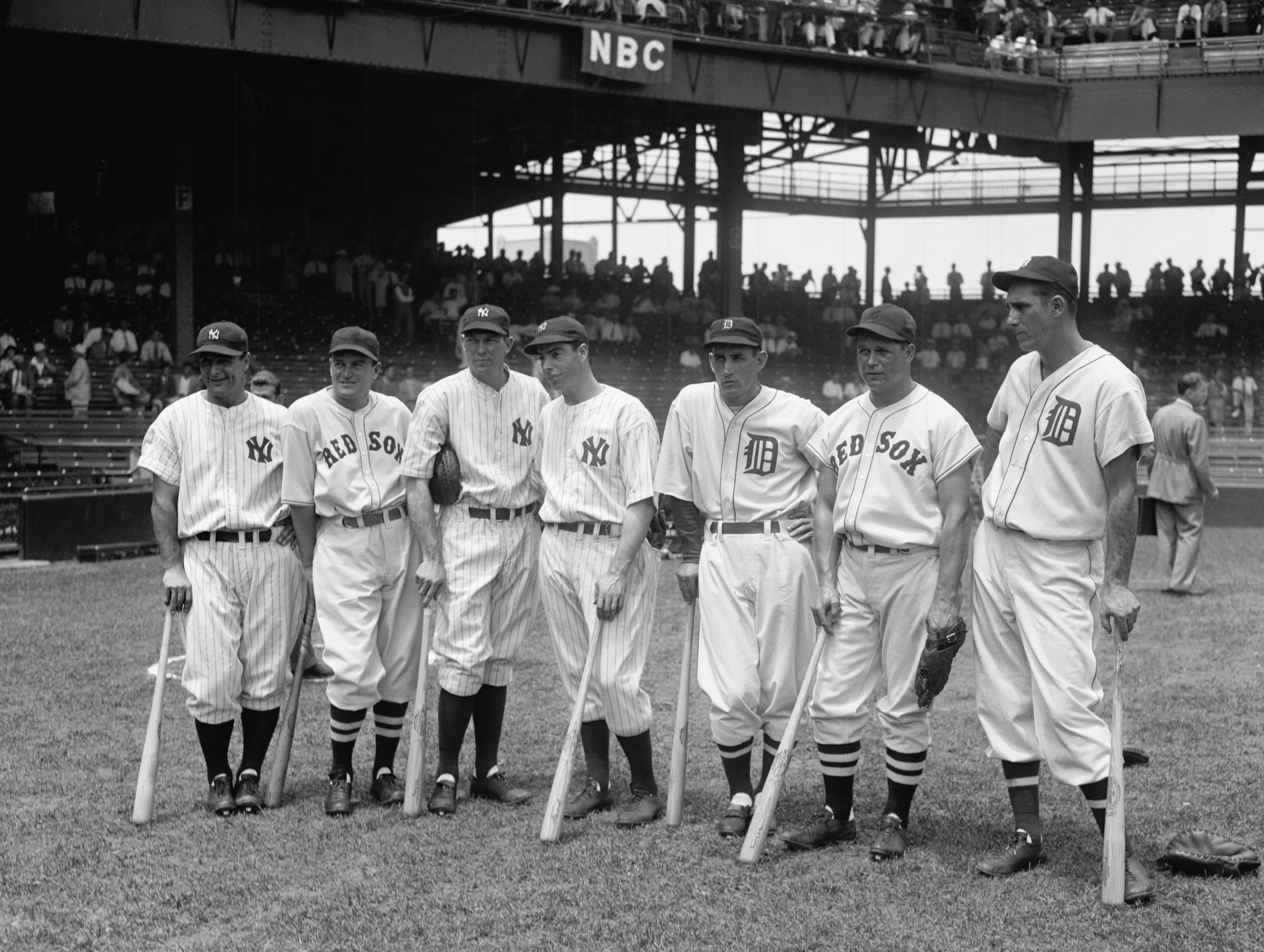
Seven of the American League's 1937 All-Star players, from left to right Lou Gehrig, Joe Cronin, Bill Dickey, Joe DiMaggio, Charlie Gehringer, Jimmie Foxx, and Hank Greenberg. All seven would be elected to the Hall of Fame.

His first season with the Red Sox was another standout campaign as he led the team in every batting category except stolen bases. He finished in the top 10 in most offensive categories by the end of the season and hit over 40 home runs for the fourth time in his career. The following season was the first time where health problems had a large effect. He fell ill with the flu during spring training in 1937 and was admitted to the hospital with pain in his forehead and vision problems. He missed the first handful of games in the season before returning with the club. He still continued to hit home runs that would leave the ballpark, including one that left Fenway Park by the center field flagpole. Hall of Fame pitcher Lefty Gomez once joked about a home run hit off him, stating "I knew immediately what it was. That was a home-run ball hit off me in 1937 by Jimmie Foxx" in response to Apollo astronauts finding objects on the Moon. There is no record of Foxx hitting a home run off Gomez that season, but Foxx had hit 14 home runs off Gomez during his career.

In 1938, Foxx put on an offensive showcase during the months of May, June, and September, recording at least 10 home runs and 30 RBI in each of those three months, including over 40 in the final month of the season. On June 16, 1938, he tied an American League record when he walked six times in a game. His totals at the end of the year set many Red Sox single-season team records. His 175 RBI that year remain a Boston Red Sox record, his 50 home runs were a record until Hall of Famer David Ortiz surpassed it in 2006 with 54, and his 398 total bases were most by a Red Sox until Jim Rice collected 406 total bases in 1978. Foxx was awarded his third and final MVP award at the end of the season, leading the AL in most categories, with only Hank Greenberg's 58 home runs surpassing Foxx's own total of 50.

In 1939, health problems popped up again for Foxx. Early in the season, he sought treatment for pain caused by his presumed sinus problem on a road trip from Chicago to Washington. Later on in the season, he had an emergency appendectomy in Philadelphia which cut his season short. There were very few teammates that knew how serious his health problems were. One who did was Ted Williams, who he would talk to regularly. It was at this time that Foxx had begun to drink more heavily, although it was used as a self-medication for the chronic pain that he experienced in his later career. While his heavy drinking is well known, teammates, including Ted Williams, attest that he was never overtly drunk or violent and continued to act as a mentor to his younger teammates, including Dom DiMaggio. With all of the health problems and chronic pain that Foxx had experienced, he still had an outstanding offensive season, hitting an AL leading 35 home runs and batting .360. He finished second in MVP voting behind Joe DiMaggio. His next two seasons saw him in decline, but Foxx continued to play at near-MVP levels. He hit 36 home runs in 1940, which marked his 12th straight season where he hit 30 or more. He finished sixth in MVP balloting and he was an All Star in his final full season in 1941 when he hit an even .300 and drove in 105 runs 135 games played. On September 24, 1940, he hit his 500th career home run against George Caster, becoming the second member of the 500 Home Run Club after Babe Ruth. He suffered a broken toe during spring training in 1942 and broke a rib during batting practice later in the season. In the twilight of his career, his contract was sold to the Chicago Cubs for $10,000 (equivalent to $197,047 in 2025) in June.

=== Chicago Cubs (1942, 1944) ===
With the Cubs in 1942, he split time between first base and pinch hitting duties, and by the end of the season, it was clear that his career was in sharp decline. Over 100 games, he hit .226 and had only eight home runs, by far the lowest totals of his career since his first full season in 1929. He sat out all of 1943 and returned as a pinch hitter in 1944, playing only 14 games.

=== Philadelphia Phillies (1945) ===
Foxx joined the Phillies in 1945 and was a two-way player. Between hitting and pitching, he hit 7 home runs over 89 games and compiled a 1–0 record and 1.59 earned run average (ERA) over 22 2/3 innings. He retired at the end of the season.

Foxx finished his 20-year career with 534 home runs, 1,922 runs batted in, 1,751 runs scored, 2,646 hits, 458 doubles, 125 triples, 1,452 walks and a .325 batting average. His 12 consecutive seasons with 30 or more home runs was a major league record until it was broken by Barry Bonds in 2004. At the end of his career, his 534 home runs placed him second only to Ruth on the all-time list and first among right-handed hitters. He retained these positions until Willie Mays passed Foxx for second place in 1966. Foxx set the record for the youngest player to reach 500 home runs at age 32 years and 338 days in the final week of the 1940 Major League Baseball season. It held until August 4, 2007, when it was broken by Alex Rodriguez at age 32 years and 8 days. During the 1930s, no one hit more home runs than Foxx's 415 between the Athletics and Red Sox. Six years after retirement, he was elected to the Baseball Hall of Fame in 1951.

== Career statistics ==
Years	G	AB	R	H	2B	3B	HR	TB	XBH	RBI	SB	BB	AVG	OBP	SLG	OPS	FLD%
20	2317	8134	1751	2646	458	125	534	4956	1117	1922	87	1452	.325	.428	.609	1.038	.990

In three straight World Series (1929,'30,'31) covering 18 games, Foxx batted .344 (22-for-64) with 11 runs, 3 doubles, 1 triple, 4 home runs, 11 RBI, 9 walks, on-base percentage of .425, slugging percentage of .609, and on-base plus slugging percentage of 1.034.

== Post-playing career ==
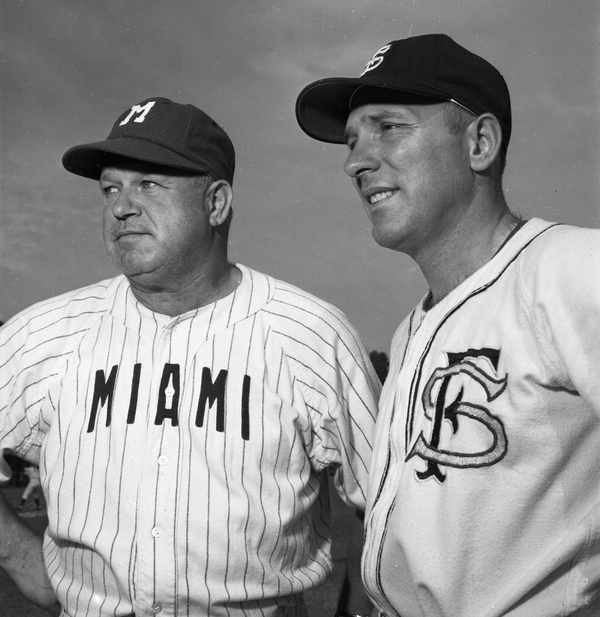
Foxx as head coach for the University of Miami in 1957

Foxx worked as a minor league manager and coach after his playing days ended, including managing the Fort Wayne Daisies of the All-American Girls Professional Baseball League for one season in 1952. He took the team to the playoffs where they lost in the first round 2 games to 1 against the Rockford Peaches. The character of Jimmy Dugan in the 1992 movie A League of Their Own, played broadly by Tom Hanks, is loosely based on Foxx; however, Foxx's players state that his behavior was more gentlemanly than the brusque demeanor displayed by the fictional Dugan character toward his team. Foxx served as head coach for the University of Miami baseball team for two seasons, going 9–8 in 1956 and 11–12 in 1957, before being let go following the 1957 season.

A series of bad investments left Foxx broke by 1958. The Red Sox responded by naming Foxx hitting coach of their Triple-A affiliate, the Minneapolis Millers of the American Association, that season. In the early 1960s, he lived in Galesburg, Illinois, where he was working as a greeter at a locally owned steakhouse. He eventually retired to suburban Cleveland in Lakewood and was employed by the Lakewood Recreation Department. His two children, a daughter and a son, also lived in Lakewood. His son, Jimmie Foxx, Jr., played football at Lakewood High School and Kent State University.

== Death ==
Foxx died on July 21, 1967, at age 59 in Miami, Florida. He became ill while eating dinner with his brother and was taken to a hospital where resuscitative efforts failed. An autopsy showed that Foxx had choked on a piece of food. The year before, Foxx's second wife, Dorothy, had also died of choking. Foxx is buried at Flagler Memorial Park in Miami.

== Legacy ==
Foxx was known as one of the greatest power hitters of all time. Ted Williams was quoted as saying in response to a question about Foxx breaking Babe Ruth's home run record, "What a man. And I'll bet he does it, too!" However, long-standing chronic health problems, injuries, heavy drinking, and a marriage of constant abuse and harassment from his first wife all caused his career to be cut short in his 30s. In 1940, Red sox teammate and future Hall of Famer Joe Cronin said, "He's a marvel, isn't he? Tell me: who was a better all-around ball player than Foxxie? Why right now I'd say he was the best catcher in the American League…They can talk all they want to about some of those old time ball players being able to play different positions. I'll take Foxxie. They don't come any better."

Foxx was known for his intimidating physical strength and often cut the sleeves from his uniforms to show off his biceps. Lefty Gomez joked that Foxx "had muscles in his hair" and that "He wasn't scouted—he was trapped."

A statue of Foxx was erected in his hometown of Sudlersville, Maryland, on October 25, 1997. In 1999, he ranked number 15 on The Sporting News' list of the 100 Greatest Baseball Players, and was a nominee for the Major League Baseball All-Century Team.

Tom Hanks's character Jimmy Dugan in the movie A League of Their Own was largely based on Foxx and Hack Wilson, although the producers took a number of liberties in creating the role.

There is a Jimmie Foxx Street in San Antonio, Texas.

Foxx is mentioned in the poem "Line-Up for Yesterday" by Ogden Nash:

"Line-Up for Yesterday"

X is the first
Of two x's in Foxx
Who was right behind Ruth
With his powerful soxx.

— Ogden Nash, Sport magazine (January 1949)

== See also ==
- Major League Baseball Triple Crown
- List of Major League Baseball annual home run leaders
- List of Major League Baseball annual runs batted in leaders
- List of Major League Baseball batting champions
- List of Major League Baseball career home run leaders
- List of Major League Baseball career total bases leaders
- List of Major League Baseball career hits leaders
- List of Major League Baseball career batting average leaders
- List of Major League Baseball career on-base percentage leaders
- List of Major League Baseball career slugging percentage leaders
- List of Major League Baseball career runs scored leaders
- List of Major League Baseball career doubles leaders
- List of Major League Baseball career triples leaders
- List of Major League Baseball career extra base hits leaders
- List of Major League Baseball career total bases leaders
- List of Major League Baseball career OPS leaders
- List of Major League Baseball career runs batted in leaders
- List of Major League Baseball career bases on balls leaders
- List of Major League Baseball career putouts leaders
- List of Major League Baseball individual streaks
- List of Major League Baseball players to hit for the cycle
- List of Major League Baseball single-game hits leaders

Achievements
Preceded by Ty Cobb	American League Triple Crown; 1933	Succeeded by Lou Gehrig
Preceded by Pinky Higgins	Hitting for the cycle August 14, 1933	Succeeded by Earl Averill
