= Ted Lyons =

American baseball player and manager (1900–1986)

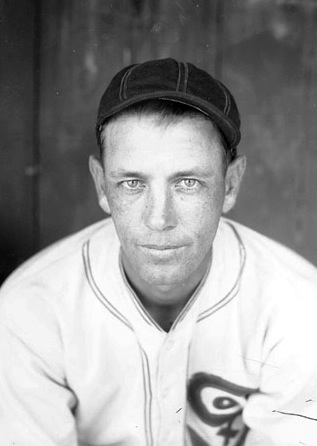
- Lyons with the Chicago White Sox in 1930
- Pitcher / Manager
- Born: December 28, 1900; Lake Charles, Louisiana, U.S.
- Died: July 25, 1986 (aged 85); Sulphur, Louisiana, U.S.
- Batted: Switch Threw: Right

MLB debut
- July 2, 1923, for the Chicago White Sox

Last MLB appearance
- May 19, 1946, for the Chicago White Sox

MLB statistics
- Win–loss record: 260–230
- Earned run average: 3.67
- Strikeouts: 1,073
- Managerial record: 185–245
- Winning %: .430
- Stats at Baseball Reference
- Managerial record at Baseball Reference

Teams
- As player: Chicago White Sox (1923–1942, 1946); As manager: Chicago White Sox (1946–1948)

Career highlights and awards
- All-Star (1939); 2× AL wins leader (1925, 1927); AL ERA leader (1942); Pitched a no-hitter on August 21, 1926; Chicago White Sox No. 16 retired

Member of the National

Baseball Hall of Fame
- Induction: 1955
- Vote: 86.5% (tenth ballot)

Theodore Amar Lyons (December 28, 1900 – July 25, 1986) was an American professional baseball starting pitcher, manager and coach in Major League Baseball (MLB). He played in 21 MLB seasons, all with the Chicago White Sox. He is the franchise leader in wins. Lyons won 20 or more games three times (in 1925, 1927, and 1930) and became a fan favorite in Chicago.

Lyons was inducted into the Baseball Hall of Fame in 1955. He has the fourth-highest career ERA among Hall of Fame pitchers, and is the only Hall of Fame pitcher to have more walks than strikeouts. In 1981 Lawrence Ritter and Donald Honig included Lyons in their book The 100 Greatest Baseball Players of All Time.

== Career ==
=== Playing career ===
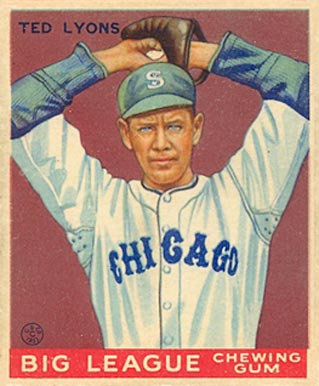
Lyons's 1933 Goudey baseball card.

Lyons broke into the major leagues in 1923 after playing collegiate baseball at Baylor University. He joined the White Sox on a road trip and never pitched a day in the minors. Lyons recorded his first two wins as a relief pitcher in a doubleheader on October 6, 1923, making him one of the first pitchers to perform the feat. He worked his way into the starting rotation the following year, when he posted a 12–11 record and 4.87 ERA.

On August 21, 1926, Lyons no-hit the Boston Red Sox 6–0 at Fenway Park; the game took just 1 hour and 45 minutes to complete (Ted Lyons August 21, 1926 No-hitter Box Score).

On May 24, 1929, Lyons threw a 21 inning complete game in a 6-5 loss to the Detroit Tigers. George Uhle, who was the winning pitcher, also pitched twenty innings to earn his eighth win of the season. The pair became the tenth pair of pitchers in baseball history to throw at least 20 innings in a game and only the 4th since the live-ball era began in 1920.

Lyons was at his crafty best in 1930, when he posted a 22–15 record and A.L.-leading totals of 29 complete games and 297 2/3 innings for a team that finished 62–92. Prior to a 1931 arm injury, his pitches included a "sailer" (now known as a cut fastball), knuckleball, curveball, and changeup. After the 1931 injury, his pitches included a fastball, slow curve, knuckleball and an even slower curveball used as a changeup.

As Lyons aged, his career benefited from the White Sox' decision to never let him pitch more than 30 games per season from 1934 on. He was such a draw among the fans that, as his career began to wind down in 1939, manager Jimmy Dykes began using him only in Sunday afternoon games, which earned him the nickname "Sunday Teddy". Lyons made the most of his unusual scheduling, winning 52 of 82 decisions from 1939 until 1942.

During 1942, Lyons's 20th and last full season, he led the league with a 2.10 ERA and completed every one of his 20 starts. Although exempt from the military draft due to age, after the season he enlisted in the United States Marine Corps and fought in the Pacific War. In 1943, the White Sox announced that Lyons's jersey number would not be reissued. In May of that year, he was based in Chicago at the Navy Pier. He commented that he would not be able to return to pitching if the war lasted three or four more years.

Lyons made a brief return to the mound in 1946, with a 2.32 ERA in five games, all complete. He stopped pitching for good that season, having compiled a 260–230 record, 356 complete games, 1073 strikeouts and a 3.67 ERA. Lyons never appeared in a postseason game, as the generally mediocre-to-poor White Sox were usually far behind the American League leaders during his career. In Lyons's 21 seasons with the Sox, they finished fifth or lower (in an eight-team league) 16 times, and never finished higher than third. New York Yankees manager Joe McCarthy said, "If (Lyons had) pitched for the Yankees, he would have won over 400 games."

Lyons was a better than average hitting pitcher in his 21-year major league career, posting a .233 batting average (364-for-1563) with 162 runs, 49 doubles, 9 triples, 5 home runs, 149 RBI and 73 bases on balls. He was used as a pinch hitter 45 times. Defensively, he recorded a .958 fielding percentage which was only a couple of points higher than the league average at his position.

=== Managing and coaching career ===
In May 1946, six days after what would be his last game as a pitcher, Lyons took over as manager of the White Sox after an apparent contract dispute between Dykes and Grace Comiskey. He had less success as a manager than he had as a player, guiding them to a meager 185–245 record. Lyons resigned as manager in October 1948.

Lyons coached the pitchers for the Detroit Tigers (1949–1953) and Brooklyn Dodgers (1954).

The Chicago White Sox retired Lyons's number 16.

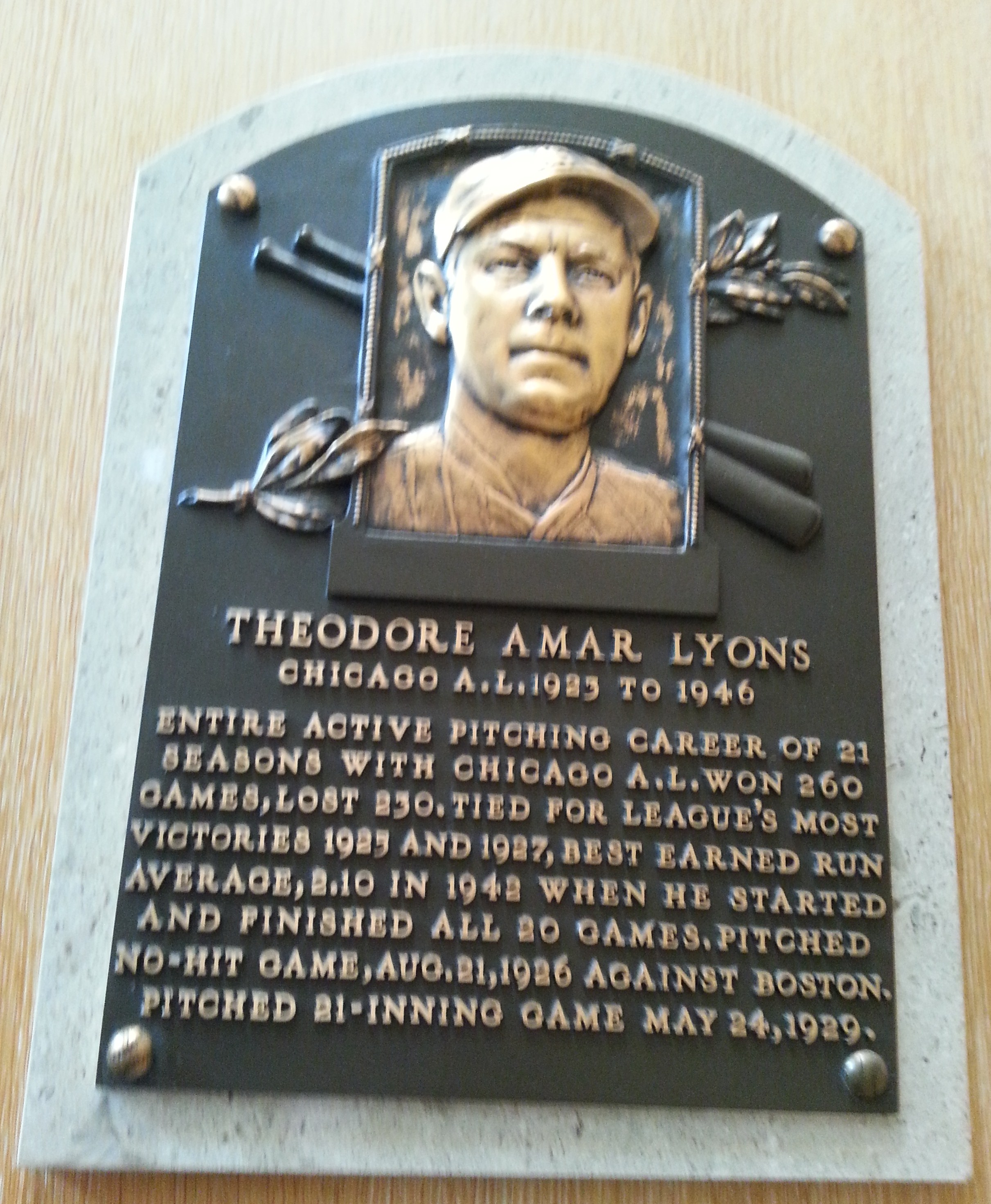
Lyons's plaque at the National Baseball Hall of Fame and Museum

==== Managerial record ====
| Team | Year | Regular season | | | | | Postseason | | | |
| Team | Year | Games | Won | Lost | Win % | Finish | Won | Lost | Win % | Result |
|---|---|---|---|---|---|---|---|---|---|---|
| CWS | 1946 | 124 | 64 | 60 | .516 | 5th in AL | – | – | – | – |
| CWS | 1947 | 154 | 70 | 84 | .455 | 6th in AL | – | – | – | – |
| CWS | 1948 | 152 | 51 | 101 | .336 | 8th in AL | – | – | – | – |
| Total | | 430 | 185 | 245 | .430 | | 0 | 0 | – | |

== Later life ==
In 1955, he was inducted into the Baseball Hall of Fame. Lyons served as a scout with the White Sox until his retirement in 1967. Apart from his wartime service and his stints as a coach with the Tigers and Dodgers, he spent over 40 years on the White Sox payroll. Lawrence Ritter and Donald Honig included Lyons in their book The 100 Greatest Baseball Players of All Time (1981).

On July 25, 1986, Lyons died in a nursing home in Sulphur, Louisiana. One year later, the White Sox retired his uniform number, #16.

In 2013, the Bob Feller Act of Valor Award honored Lyons as one of 37 Baseball Hall of Fame members for his service in the United States Marine Corps during World War II.

== See also ==
- List of knuckleball pitchers
- List of Major League Baseball career wins leaders
- List of Major League Baseball annual ERA leaders
- List of Major League Baseball annual wins leaders
- List of Major League Baseball no-hitters
- List of Major League Baseball player-managers
- List of Major League Baseball players who spent their entire career with one franchise
- List of baseball players who went directly to Major League Baseball

| Preceded by Howard Ehmke | No-hitter pitcher August 21, 1926 | Succeeded by Carl Hubbell |
