= 1909 Boston Doves season =

1909 Boston Doves
- League: National League
- Ballpark: South End Grounds
- City: Boston, Massachusetts
- Record: 45–108 (.294)
- League place: 8th
- Owners: George Dovey, John Dovey
- Managers: Harry Smith, Frank Bowerman

The 1909 Boston Doves season was the 39th season of the franchise.

The 1909 Doves set an MLB record that still stands for most games behind the first place winner in any season since 1900. They finished 65 1/2 games behind the NL Champs and eventual World Series champion Pittsburgh Pirates.

== Regular season ==
=== Season standings ===
National League
Team	W	L	Pct.	GB	Home	Road
Pittsburgh Pirates	110	42	.724	—	56‍–‍21	54‍–‍21
Chicago Cubs	104	49	.680	6½	47‍–‍29	57‍–‍20
New York Giants	92	61	.601	18½	44‍–‍33	48‍–‍28
Cincinnati Reds	77	76	.503	33½	39‍–‍38	38‍–‍38
Philadelphia Phillies	74	79	.484	36½	40‍–‍37	34‍–‍42
Brooklyn Superbas	55	98	.359	55½	34‍–‍45	21‍–‍53
St. Louis Cardinals	54	98	.355	56	26‍–‍48	28‍–‍50
Boston Doves	45	108	.294	65½	27‍–‍47	18‍–‍61

=== Record vs. opponents ===
1909 National League record Sources:
Team	BSN	BRO	CHC	CIN	NYG	PHI	PIT	STL
Boston	—	11–11	1–21	5–17	8–14–2	10–12	1–20	9–13
Brooklyn	11–11	—	5–16	5–17–1	7–15	11–11	4–18	12–10–1
Chicago	21–1	16–5	—	16–6	11–11–1	16–6	9–13	15–7–1
Cincinnati	17–5	17–5–1	6–16	—	9–13–1	9–12–1	7–15–1	12–10
New York	14–8–2	15–7	11–11–1	13–9–1	—	12–10	11–11–1	16–5
Philadelphia	12–10	11–11	6–16	12–9–1	10–12	—	7–15	16–6
Pittsburgh	20–1	18–4	13–9	15–7–1	11–11–1	15–7	—	18–3
St. Louis	13–9	10–12–1	7–15–1	10–12	5–16	6–16	3–18	—

=== Notable transactions ===
- July 16, 1909: Charlie Starr and Johnny Bates were traded by the Doves to the Philadelphia Phillies for Buster Brown, Lew Richie and Dave Shean.

=== Roster ===
1909 Boston Doves
Roster
Pitchers: Jake Boultes; Buster Brown; Bill Chappelle; Bill Cooney; Cliff Curtis; Gus Dorner; Chick Evans; George Ferguson; Vive Lindaman; Al Mattern; Tom McCarthy; Forrest More; Lew Richie; Tom Tuckey; Kirby White	Catchers: Frank Bowerman; Peaches Graham; Bill Rariden; Al Shaw; Harry Smith; Infielders: Chick Autry; Jack Coffey; Bill Dahlen; Gus Getz; Claude Ritchey; Dave Shean; Hosea Siner; Charlie Starr; Fred Stem; Bill Sweeney	Outfielders: Johnny Bates; Ginger Beaumont; Fred Beck; Beals Becker; Bill Dam; Ernie Diehl; Herbie Moran; Roy Thomas	Manager: Frank Bowerman; Harry Smith

== Player stats ==
=== Batting ===
==== Starters by position ====
Note: Pos = Position; G = Games played; AB = At bats; H = Hits; Avg. = Batting average; HR = Home runs; RBI = Runs batted in

Pos	Player	G	AB	H	Avg.	HR	RBI
C	Peaches Graham	92	267	64	.240	0	17
1B	Fred Stem	73	245	51	.208	0	11
2B	Dave Shean	75	267	66	.247	1	29
SS	Jack Coffey	73	257	48	.187	0	20
3B	Bill Sweeney	138	493	120	.243	1	36
OF	Roy Thomas	82	281	74	.263	0	11
OF	Ginger Beaumont	123	407	107	.263	0	60
OF	Beals Becker	152	562	138	.246	6	24

==== Other batters ====
Note: G = Games played; AB = At bats; H = Hits; Avg. = Batting average; HR = Home runs; RBI = Runs batted in

Player	G	AB	H	Avg.	HR	RBI
Fred Beck	96	334	66	.198	2	27
Johnny Bates	63	236	68	.288	1	23
Charlie Starr	61	216	48	.222	0	6
Chick Autry	65	199	39	.196	0	13
Bill Dahlen	69	197	46	.234	2	16
Gus Getz	40	148	33	.223	0	9
Harry Smith	43	113	19	.168	0	4
Frank Bowerman	33	99	21	.212	0	4
Claude Ritchey	30	87	15	.172	0	3
Bill Rariden	13	42	6	.143	0	1
Al Shaw	18	41	4	.098	0	0
Herbie Moran	8	31	7	.226	0	0
Hosea Siner	10	23	3	.130	0	1
Bill Cooney	5	10	3	.300	0	0
Ernie Diehl	1	4	2	.500	0	0
Bill Dam	1	2	1	.500	0	0

=== Pitching ===
==== Starting pitchers ====
Note: G = Games pitched; IP = Innings pitched; W = Wins; L = Losses; ERA = Earned run average; SO = Strikeouts

Player	G	IP	W	L	ERA	SO
Al Mattern	47	316.1	15	21	2.85	108
Cecil Ferguson	36	226.2	5	23	3.73	87
Kirby White	23	148.1	6	13	3.22	53
Buster Brown	18	123.1	4	8	3.14	32
Cliff Curtis	10	83.0	4	5	1.41	22
Tom McCarthy	8	46.1	0	5	3.50	11

==== Other pitchers ====
Note: G = Games pitched; IP = Innings pitched; W = Wins; L = Losses; ERA = Earned run average; SO = Strikeouts

Player	G	IP	W	L	ERA	SO
Lew Richie	22	131.2	7	7	2.32	42
Tom Tuckey	17	90.2	0	9	4.27	16
Vive Lindaman	15	66.0	1	6	4.64	13
Forrest More	10	48.2	1	5	4.44	10
Bill Chappelle	5	29.0	1	1	1.86	8
Gus Dorner	5	24.2	1	2	2.55	7
Chick Evans	4	21.2	0	3	4.57	11

==== Relief pitchers ====
Note: G = Games pitched; W = Wins; L = Losses; SV = Saves; ERA = Earned run average; SO = Strikeouts

Player	G	W	L	SV	ERA	SO
Bill Cooney	3	0	0	0	1.42	3
Jake Boultes	1	0	0	0	6.75	1
