= 1908 Boston Doves season =

1908 Boston Doves
- League: National League
- Ballpark: South End Grounds
- City: Boston, Massachusetts
- Record: 63–91 (.409)
- League place: 6th
- Owners: George Dovey, John Dovey
- Managers: Joe Kelley

The 1908 Boston Doves season was the 38th season of the franchise.

== Regular season ==
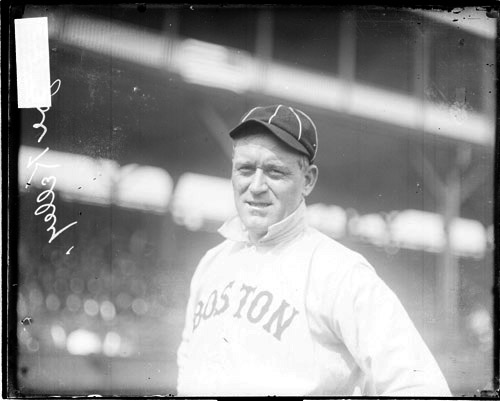
Doves manager Joe Kelley

On April 29, New York Giants manager John McGraw ridiculed Doves player and former Giants player Dan McGann by calling him an ice wagon. Many former Giants were now on the Doves roster. McGraw and McGann engaged in a fight at the Copley Square Hotel.

=== Season standings ===
National League
Team	W	L	Pct.	GB	Home	Road
Chicago Cubs	99	55	.643	—	47‍–‍30	52‍–‍25
New York Giants	98	56	.636	1	52‍–‍25	46‍–‍31
Pittsburgh Pirates	98	56	.636	1	42‍–‍35	56‍–‍21
Philadelphia Phillies	83	71	.539	16	43‍–‍34	40‍–‍37
Cincinnati Reds	73	81	.474	26	40‍–‍37	33‍–‍44
Boston Doves	63	91	.409	36	35‍–‍42	28‍–‍49
Brooklyn Superbas	53	101	.344	46	27‍–‍50	26‍–‍51
St. Louis Cardinals	49	105	.318	50	28‍–‍49	21‍–‍56

=== Record vs. opponents ===
1908 National League record Sources:
Team	BSN	BRO	CHC	CIN	NYG	PHI	PIT	STL
Boston	—	12–10	6–16–2	8–14	6–16	10–12	7–15	14–8
Brooklyn	10–12	—	4–18	6–16	6–16	5–17	9–13	13–9
Chicago	16–6–2	18–4	—	16–6	11–11–1	9–13–1	10–12	19–3
Cincinnati	14–8	16–6	6–16	—	8–14–1	10–12	8–14	11–11
New York	16–6	16–6	11–11–1	14–8–1	—	16–6	11–11–1	14–8
Philadelphia	12–10	17–5	13–9–1	12–10	6–16	—	9–13	14–8
Pittsburgh	15–7	13–9	12–10	14–8	11–11–1	13–9	—	20–2
St. Louis	8–14	9–13	3–19	11–11	8–14	8–14	2–20	—

=== Roster ===
1908 Boston Doves
Roster
Pitchers: Jake Boultes; Bill Chappelle; Gus Dorner; George Ferguson; Patsy Flaherty; Vive Lindaman; Charlie Maloney; Al Mattern; Tom McCarthy; Big Jeff Pfeffer; Tom Tuckey; Harley Young; Irv Young	Catchers: Jim Ball; Frank Bowerman; Peaches Graham; Harry Smith; Infielders: Bill Dahlen; Jack Hannifin; Dan McGann; Claude Ritchey; Fred Stem; Bill Sweeney; Walt Thomas	Outfielders: Johnny Bates; Ginger Beaumont; Beals Becker; George Browne; Joe Kelley; Herbie Moran	Manager: Joe Kelley

== Player stats ==
=== Batting ===
==== Starters by position ====
Note: Pos = Position; G = Games played; AB = At bats; H = Hits; Avg. = Batting average; HR = Home runs; RBI = Runs batted in

Pos	Player	G	AB	H	Avg.	HR	RBI
C	Peaches Graham	75	215	59	.274	0	22
1B	Dan McGann	135	475	114	.240	2	55
2B	Claude Ritchey	121	421	115	.273	2	36
SS	Bill Dahlen	144	524	125	.239	3	48
3B	Bill Sweeney	127	418	102	.244	0	40
OF	Ginger Beaumont	125	476	127	.267	2	52
OF	Johnny Bates	127	445	115	.258	1	29
OF	George Browne	138	536	122	.228	1	34

==== Other batters ====
Note: G = Games played; AB = At bats; H = Hits; Avg. = Batting average; HR = Home runs; RBI = Runs batted in

Player	G	AB	H	Avg.	HR	RBI
Jack Hannifin	90	257	53	.206	2	22
Frank Bowerman	86	254	58	.228	1	25
Joe Kelley	73	228	59	.259	2	17
Beals Becker	43	171	47	.275	0	7
Harry Smith	41	130	32	.246	1	16
Fred Stem	20	72	20	.278	0	3
Herbie Moran	8	29	8	.276	0	2
Jim Ball	6	15	1	.067	0	0
Walt Thomas	5	13	2	.154	0	1

=== Pitching ===
==== Starting pitchers ====
Note: G = Games pitched; IP = Innings pitched; W = Wins; L = Losses; ERA = Earned run average; SO = Strikeouts

Player	G	IP	W	L	ERA	SO
Vive Lindaman	43	270.2	12	16	2.36	68
Patsy Flaherty	31	244.0	12	18	3.25	50
Gus Dorner	38	216.1	8	19	3.54	41
Cecil Ferguson	37	208.0	11	11	2.47	98
Tom McCarthy	14	94.0	7	3	1.63	27
Irv Young	16	85.0	4	9	2.86	32
Tom Tuckey	8	72.0	3	3	2.50	26

==== Other pitchers ====
Note: G = Games pitched; IP = Innings pitched; W = Wins; L = Losses; ERA = Earned run average; SO = Strikeouts

Player	G	IP	W	L	ERA	SO
Jake Boultes	17	74.2	3	5	3.01	28
Bill Chappelle	13	70.1	2	4	1.79	23
Al Mattern	5	30.1	1	2	2.08	8
Harley Young	6	27.1	0	1	3.29	12

==== Relief pitchers ====
Note: G = Games pitched; W = Wins; L = Losses; SV = Saves; ERA = Earned run average; SO = Strikeouts

Player	G	W	L	SV	ERA	SO
Big Jeff Pfeffer	4	0	0	0	12.60	3
Charlie Maloney	1	0	0	0	4.50	0
