= Philadelphia Phillies all-time roster (S) =

List of baseball players

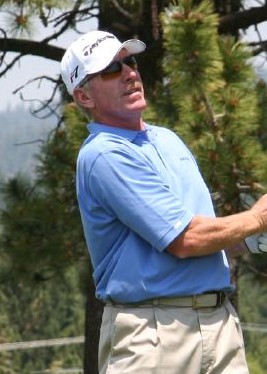
Mike Schmidt holds several Phillies franchise records, including most career home runs, hits, total bases, and runs batted in.

The Philadelphia Phillies are a Major League Baseball team based in Philadelphia, Pennsylvania. They are a member of the Eastern Division of Major League Baseball's National League. The team has played officially under two names since beginning play in 1883: the current moniker, as well as the "Quakers", which was used in conjunction with "Phillies" during the team's early history. The team was also known unofficially as the "Blue Jays" during the World War II era. Since the franchise's inception, 2,081 players have made an appearance in a competitive game for the team, whether as an offensive player (batting and baserunning) or a defensive player (fielding, pitching, or both).

Of those 2,081 Phillies, 187 have had surnames beginning with the letter S. Three of those players are members of the Baseball Hall of Fame: shortstop Ryne Sandberg, who played one season for the Phillies before being traded to the Chicago Cubs and converting to second base; right fielder Casey Stengel, who played for the Phillies during the 1920 and 1921 seasons and was inducted as a manager; and third baseman Mike Schmidt, who in 1983 was named the greatest Phillie of all time during the election of Philadelphia's Centennial Team. Schmidt is this list's only Hall of Famer to have the Phillies listed as his primary team, and is one of five members of this list to be elected to the Philadelphia Baseball Wall of Fame; the others are second baseman Juan Samuel, pitcher Bobby Shantz (inducted as a Philadelphia Athletic), pitcher Chris Short, and pitcher Curt Simmons. Schmidt holds numerous franchise records, including most hits (2,234) and most total bases (4,404), and is the only Phillie on this list to have his number retired.

Among the 99 batters in this list, left fielder and pitcher Edgar Smith has the highest batting average, at .750; he hit safely in three of his four career at-bats with Philadelphia. Other players with an average above .300 include Monk Sherlock (.324 in one season), Jim Shilling (.303 in one season), Tripp Sigman (.326 in two seasons), Lonnie Smith (.321 in four seasons), Chris Snelling (.500 in one season), Bill Sorrell (.365 in one season), John Stearns (.500 in one season), Bobby Stevens (.343 in one season), Kelly Stinnett (.429 in one season), and Joe Sullivan (.324 in three seasons). Schmidt leads all players on this list, and all Phillies, with 548 home runs and 1,595 runs batted in.

Of this list's 90 pitchers, four share the best win–loss record (1–0), in terms of winning percentage: Ben Shields, Wayne Simpson, Paul Stuffel, and Rich Surhoff. Short leads all members of this list in victories (132) and defeats (127), followed closely by Simmons in each category (115–110). Short's 1,585 strikeouts also lead, and he is followed by Curt Schilling's 1,554. The lowest earned run average (ERA) is shared by Surhoff and Jake Smith; each allowed no earned runs during their Phillies careers for an ERA of 0.00. Two other pitchers have ERAs under 2.00: Frank Scanlan (1.64) and Scott Service (1.69).

Two Phillies have made 30% or more of their Phillies appearances as both pitchers and position players. In addition to Edgar Smith's batting notes above, he amassed a 15.43 ERA as a pitcher, striking out two. John Strike was hitless in seven plate appearances as a right fielder while amassing a 1–1 record as a pitcher.

Key to symbols in player list(s)
† or ‡	Indicates a member of the National Baseball Hall of Fame and Museum; ‡ indicates that the Phillies are the player's primary team^{[H]}
§	Indicates a member of the Philadelphia Baseball Wall of Fame
*	Indicates a team record^{[R]}
(#)	A number following a player's name indicates that the number was retired by the Phillies in the player's honor.
Year	Italic text indicates that the player is a member of the Phillies' active (25-man) roster.
Position(s)	Indicates the player's primary position(s)^{[P]}
Notes	Statistics shown only for playing time with Phillies^{[S]}
Ref	References

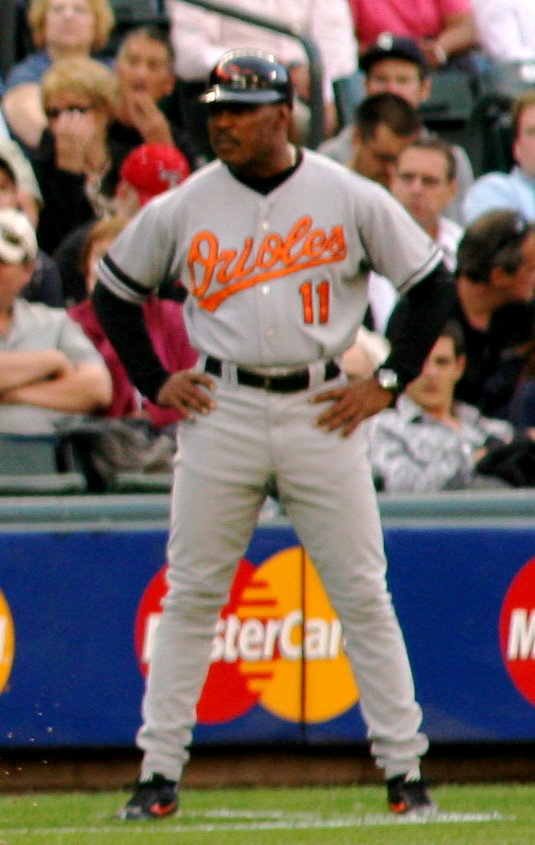
As of 2011, Juan Samuel, the Phillies' second baseman from 1983 to 1989, is the team's third-base coach.

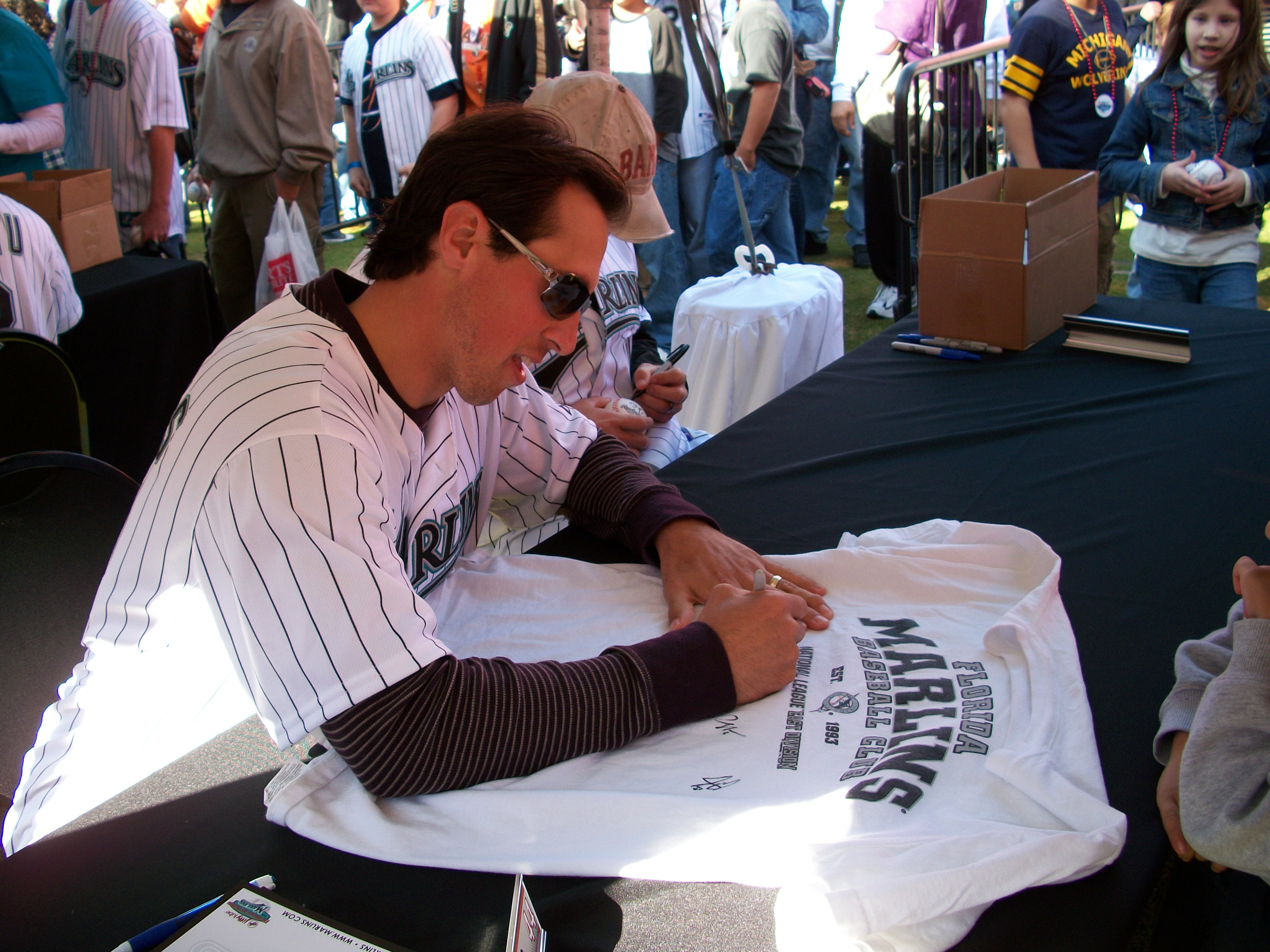
Brian Sanches pitched for Philadelphia in 2006 and 2007.

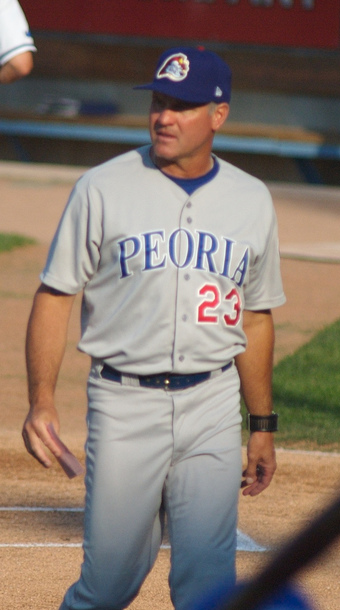
Hall of Famer Ryne Sandberg, who was a second baseman for most of his career, began as a shortstop with the Phillies.

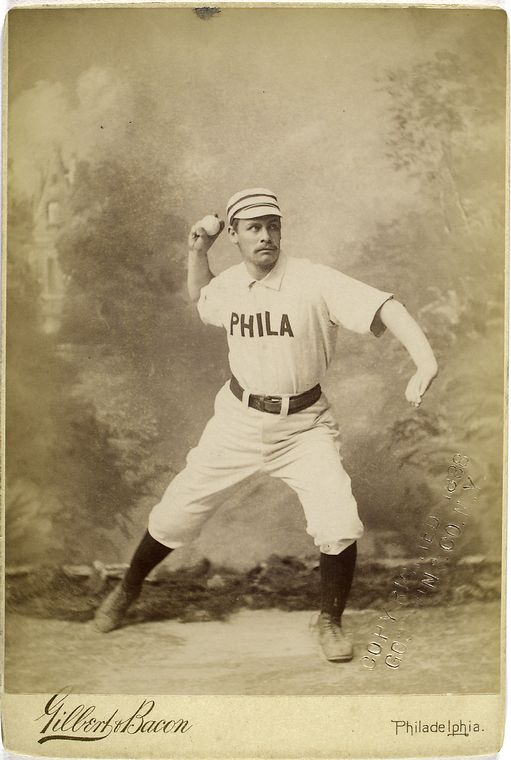
In two seasons with Philadelphia, Ben Sanders won 10 more games than he lost.

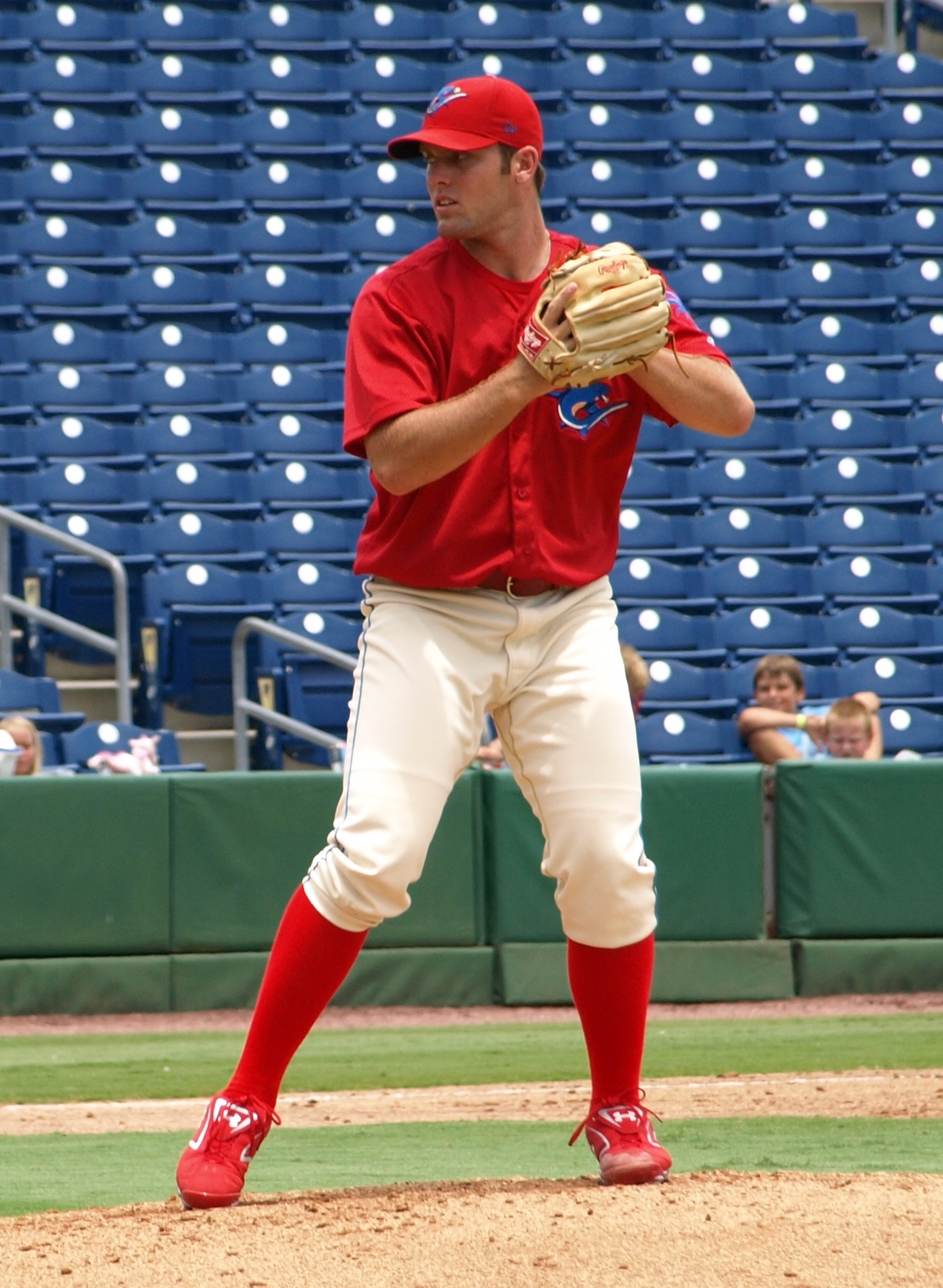
Pitcher Joe Savery began his Phillies career in 2011.

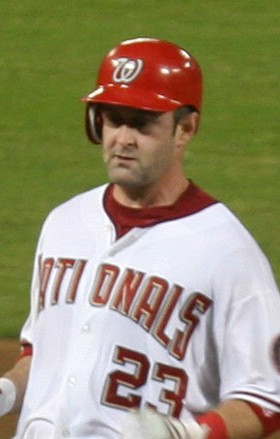
Brian Schneider hit six home runs in two Philadelphia seasons.

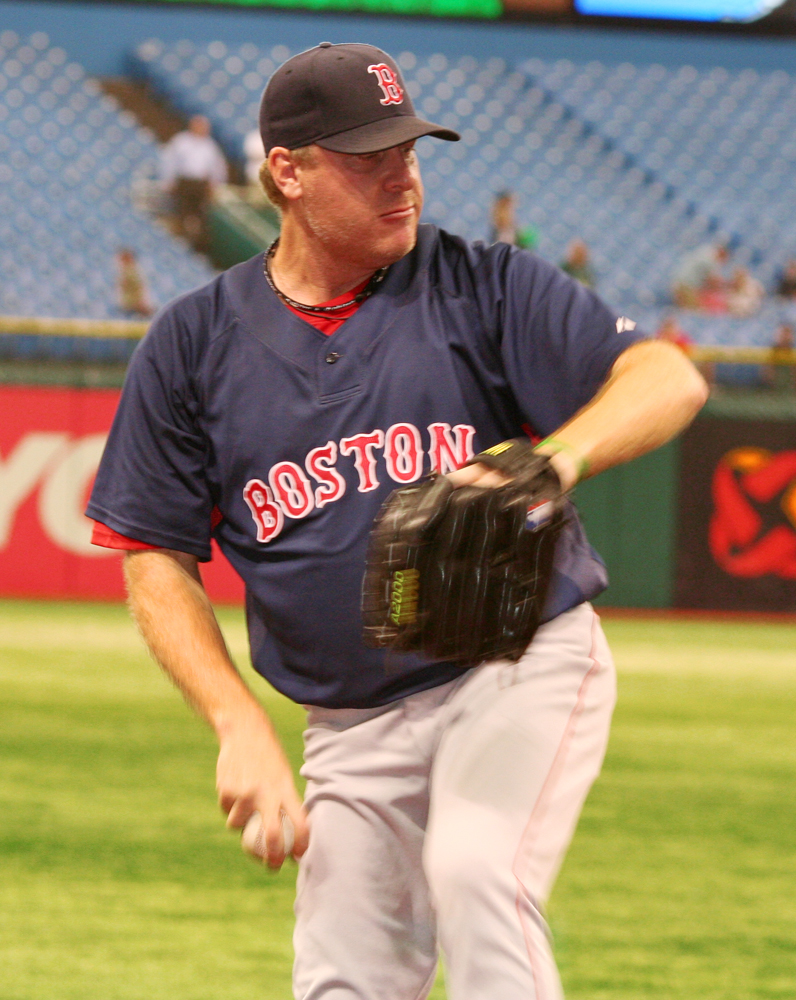
Curt Schilling holds the Phillies single-season record for most strikeouts per nine innings pitched, and appears in the top ten best seasons in that category four times.

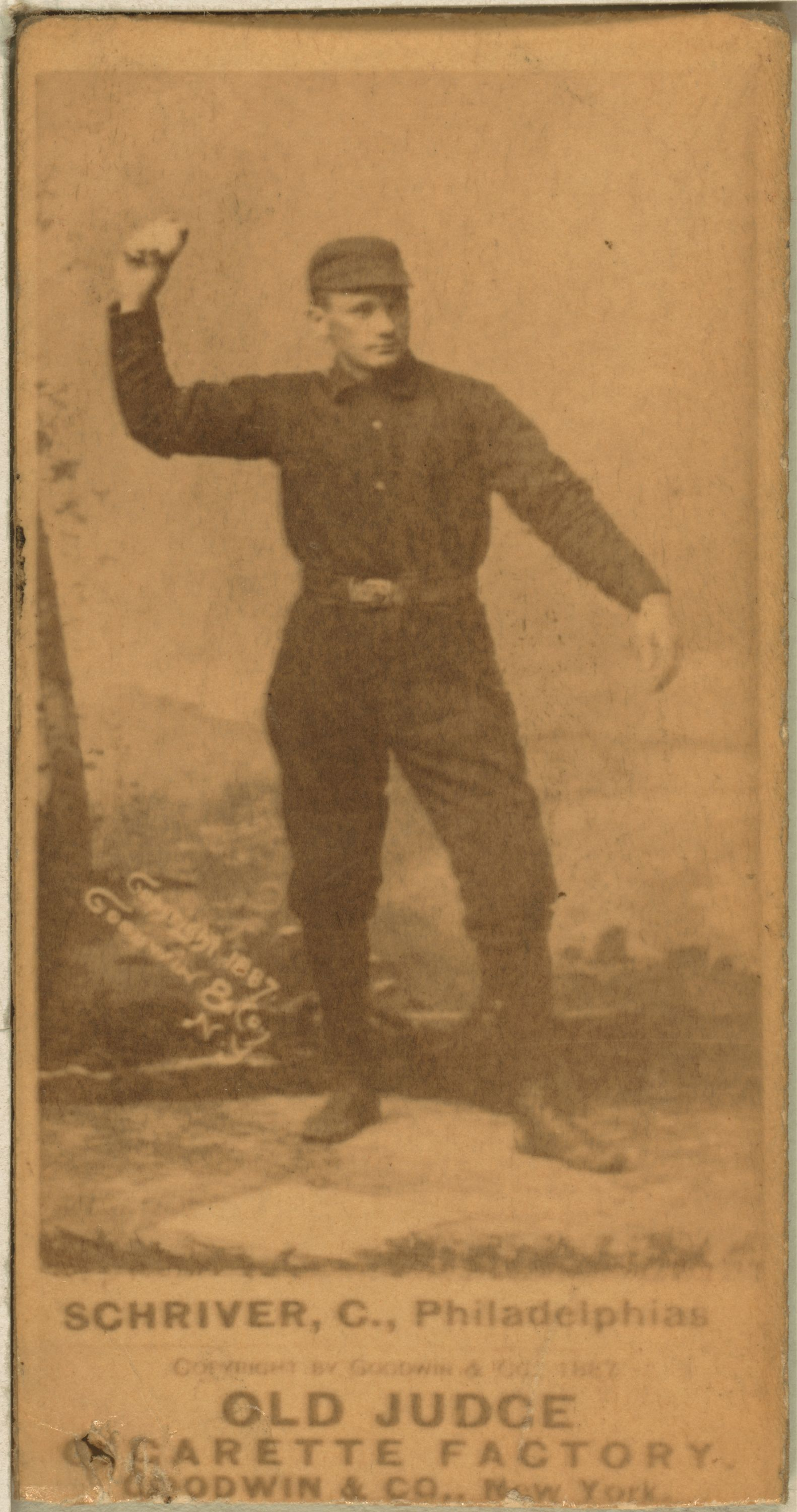
In three seasons, catcher Pop Schriver batted in 77 runs for Philadelphia.

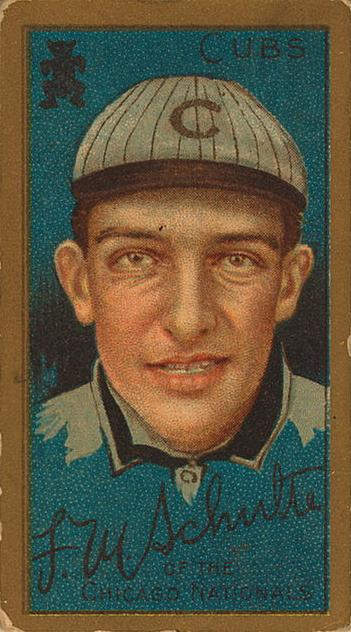
Outfielder Frank Schulte played one season for the Phillies...

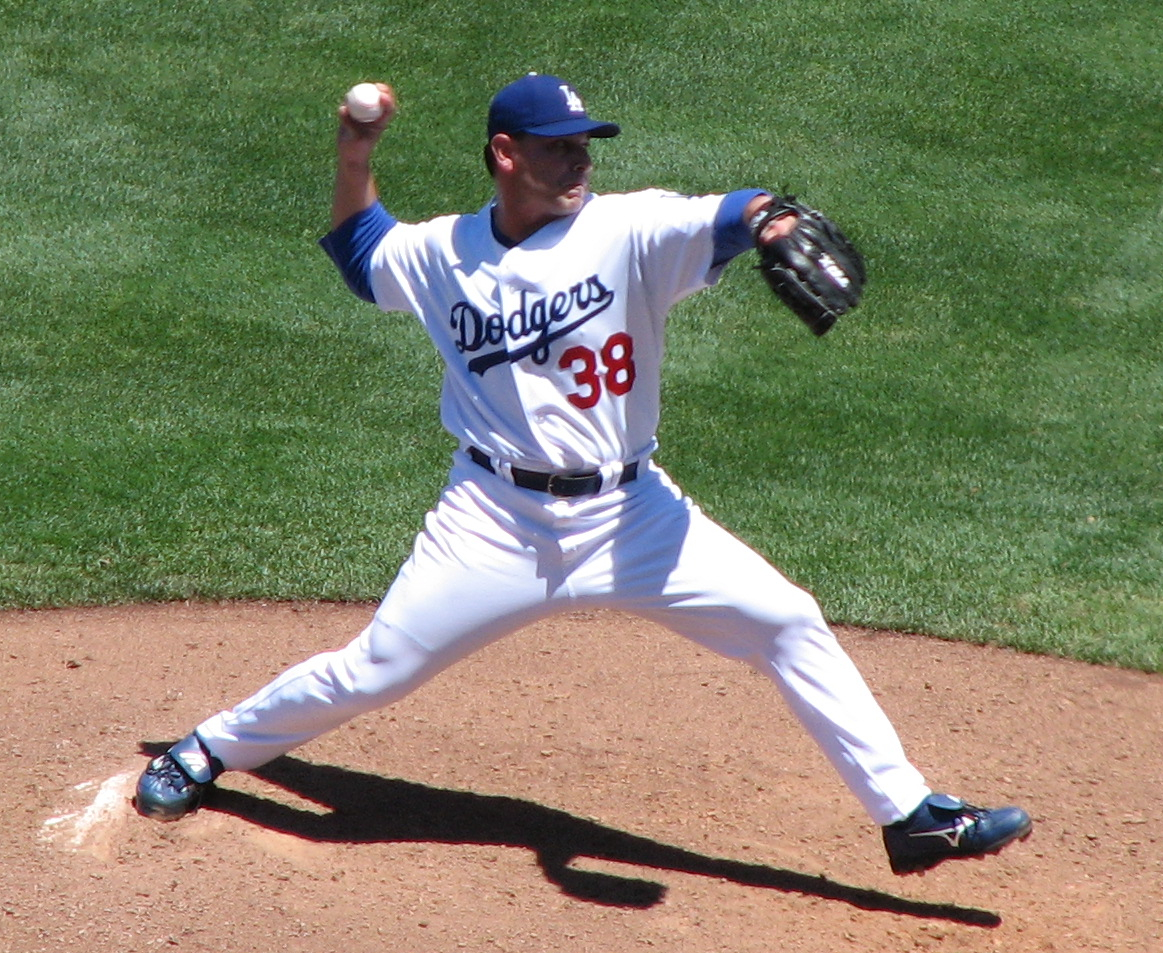
... as did pitcher Rudy Seánez.

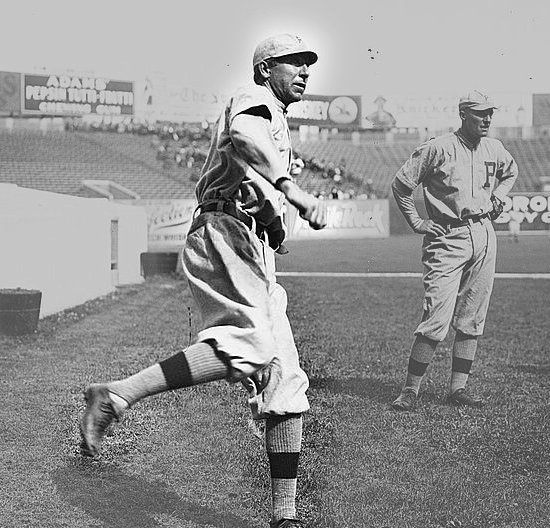
Tom Seaton won 43 games in two seasons with Philadelphia.

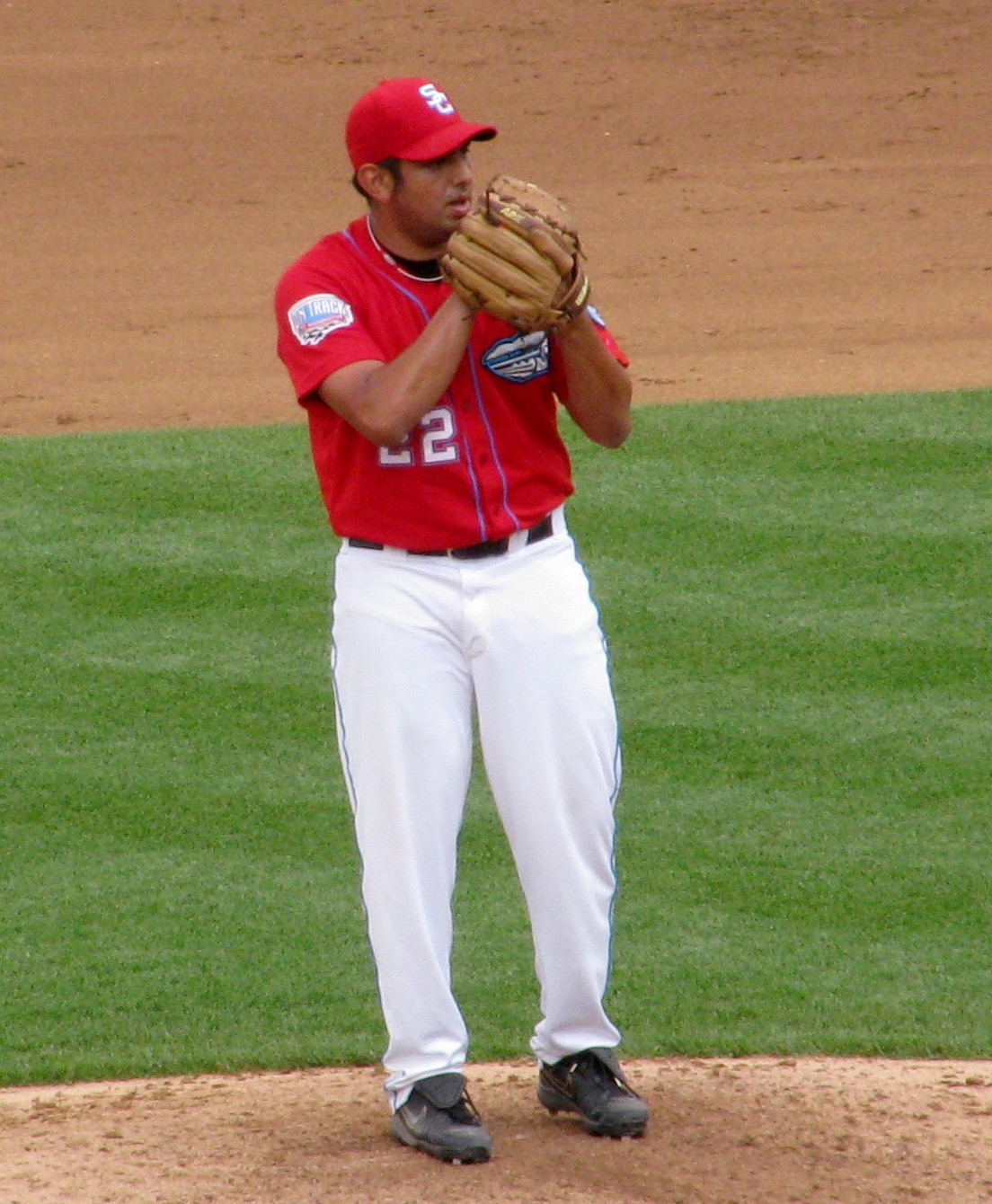
Zack Segovia lost one game for the Phillies in 2007.

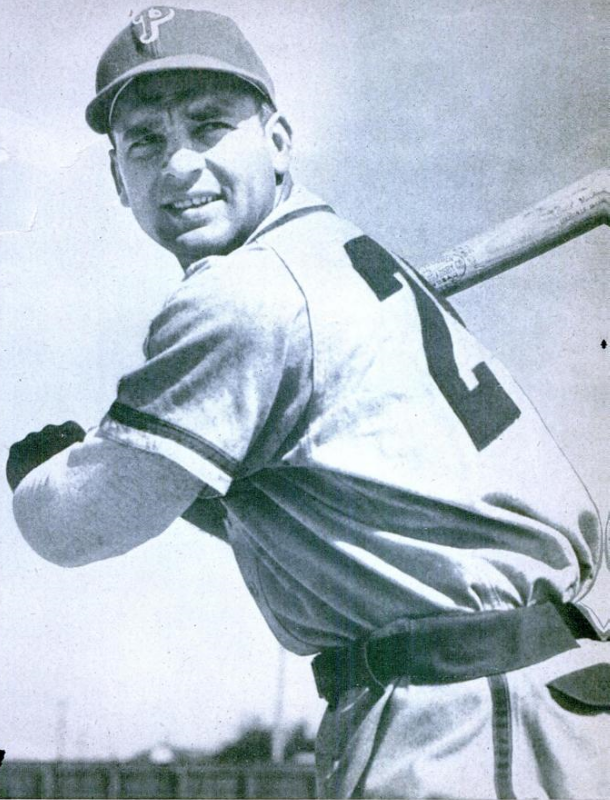
Catcher Andy Seminick was called the "clubhouse... leader" by teammate Robin Roberts, recalling his performance in 1950.

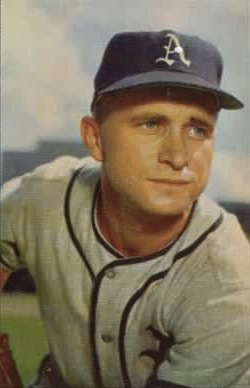
Bobby Shantz was the inaugural winner of the Rawlings Gold Glove Award as a pitcher.

In three Phillies seasons, Roy Sievers hit 44 home runs.

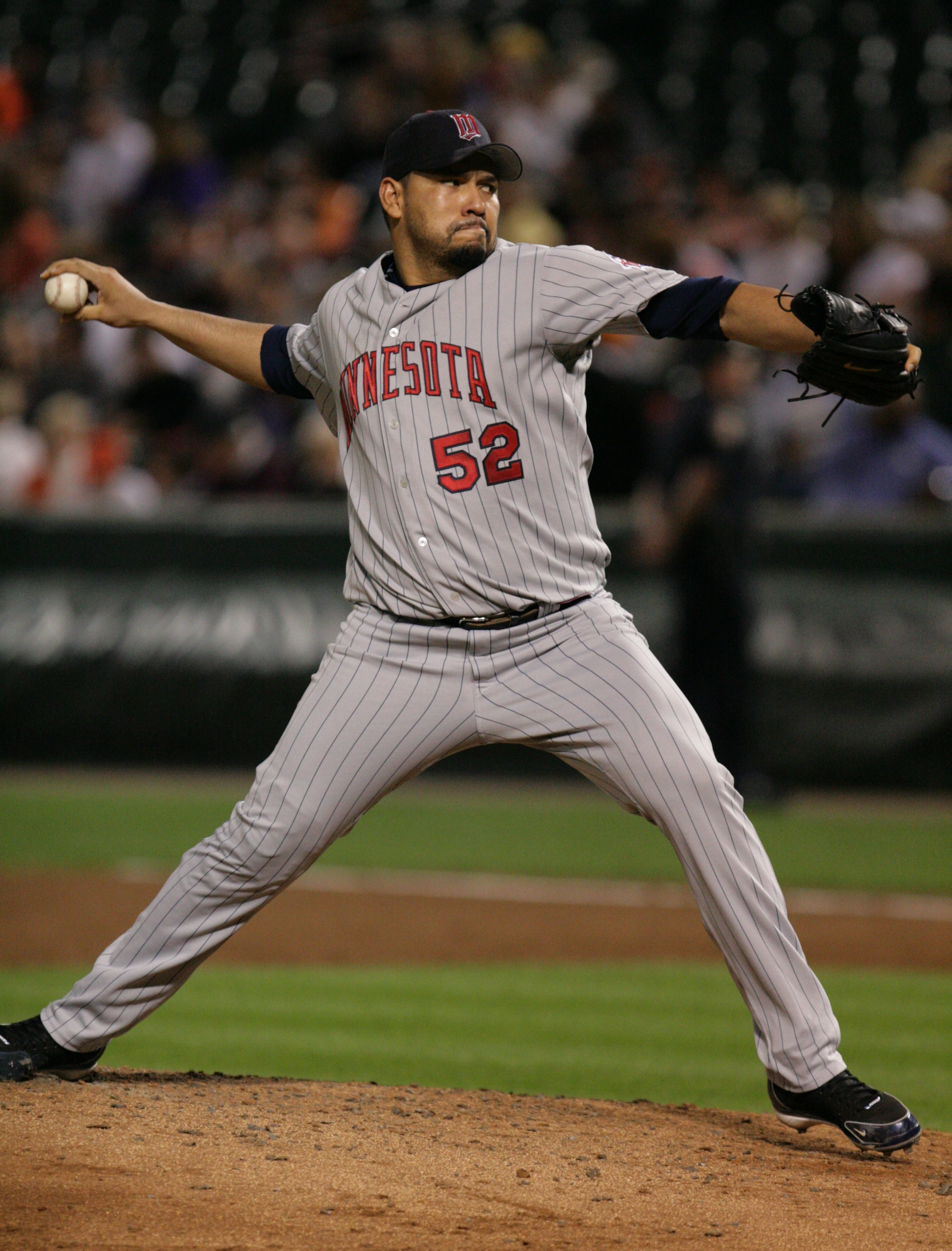
Carlos Silva won eight games in a Phillies uniform against a single loss.

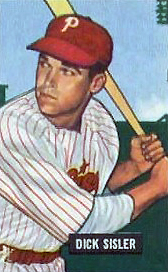
On the final day of the 1950 season, Dick Sisler hit a tenth-inning home run against the Brooklyn Dodgers that gave the Phillies their first National League pennant in 35 years.

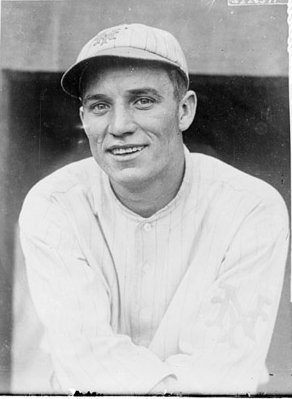
Jimmy Smith batted .227 in two seasons with Philadelphia.

Outfielder Lonnie Smith played for the Phillies from 1978 to 1981, batting .321 during his tenure.

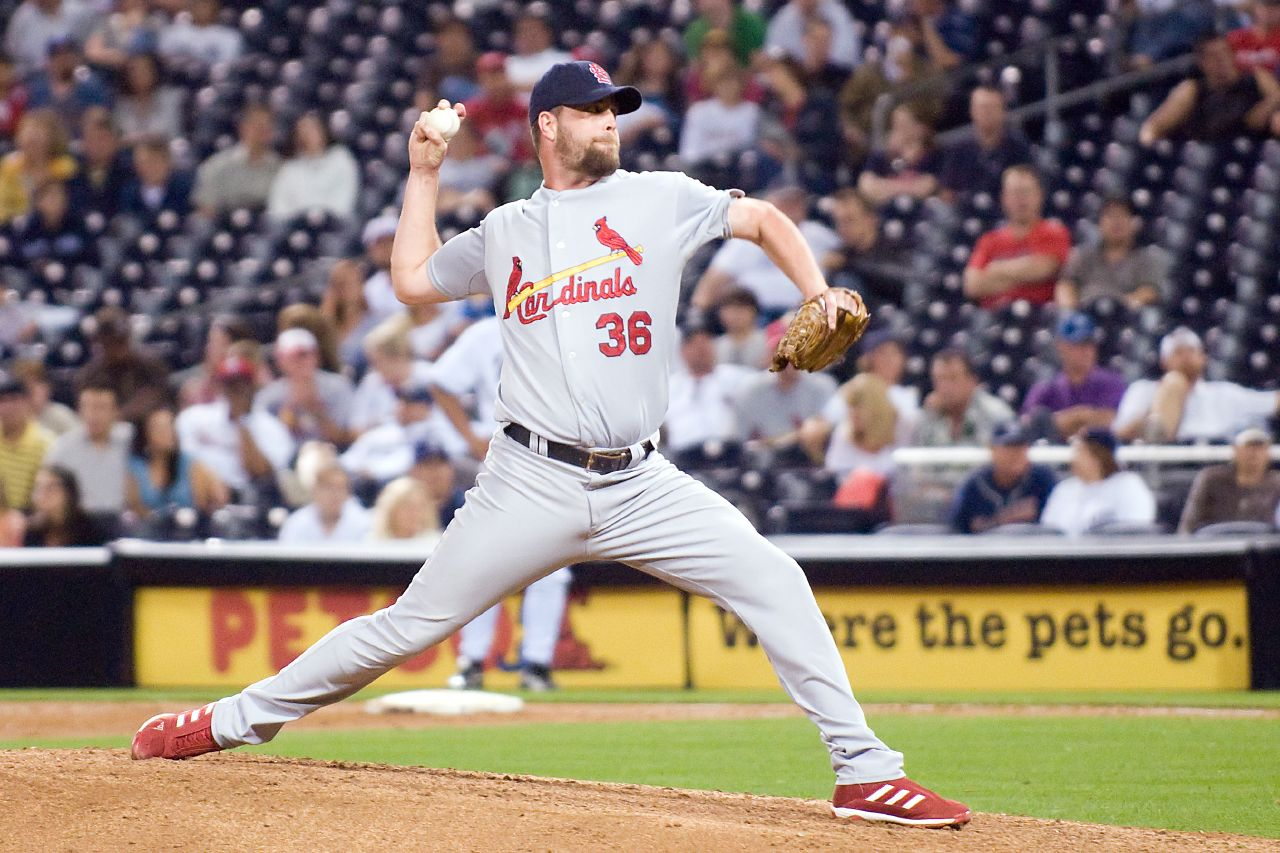
In two seasons with Philadelphia, Russ Springer struck out 126 batters.

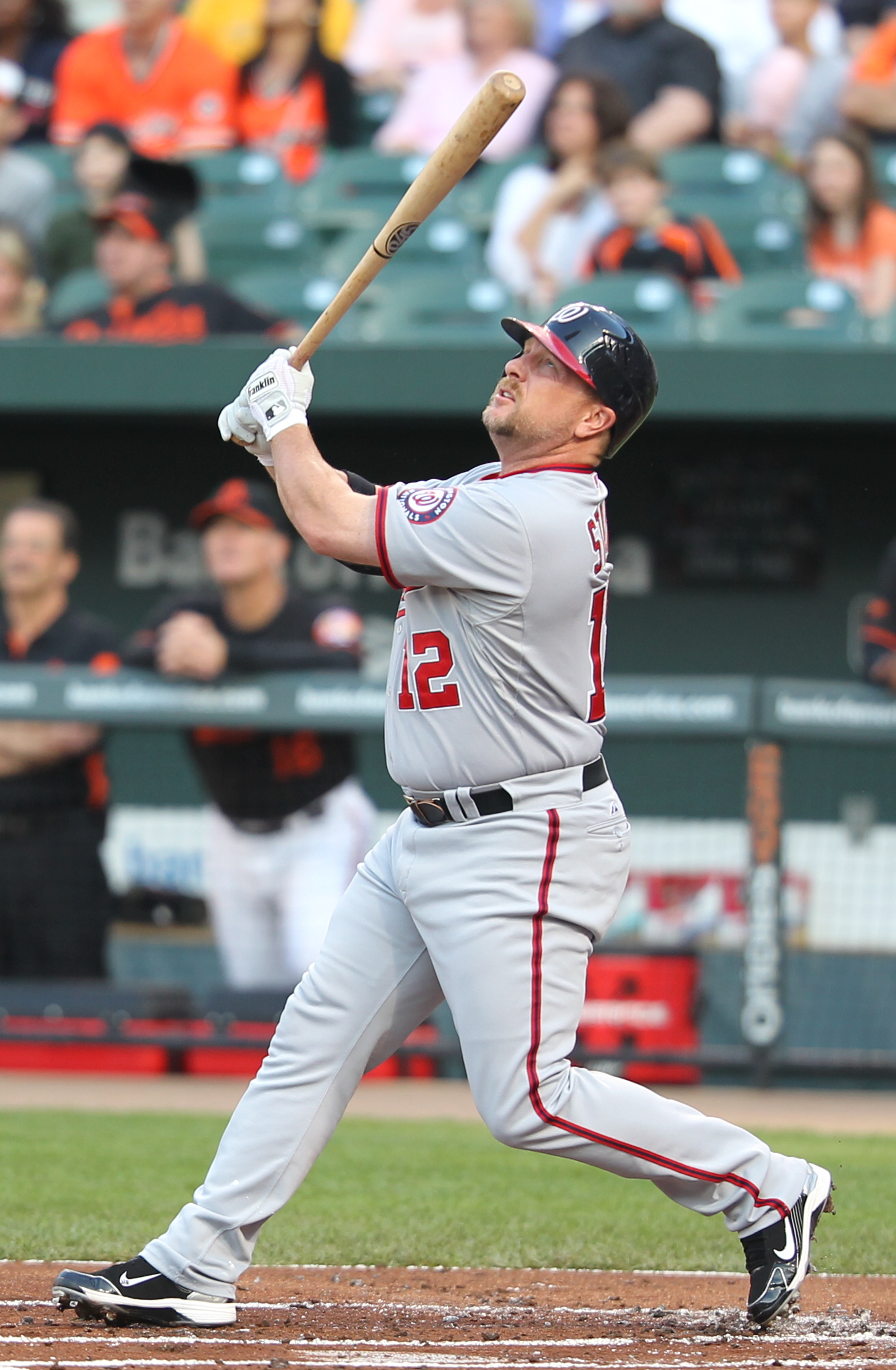
Matt Stairs' home run in Game 4 of the 2008 National League Championship Series earned him "hero" status in Philadelphia.

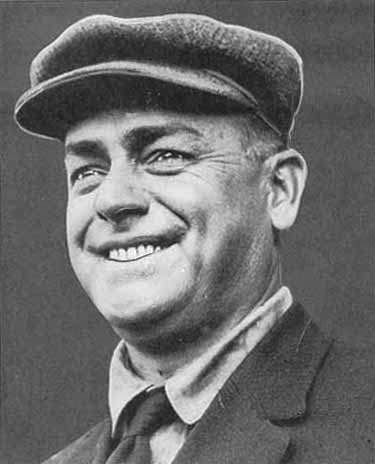
George Stallings played two seasons for the Phillies before the turn of the 20th century.

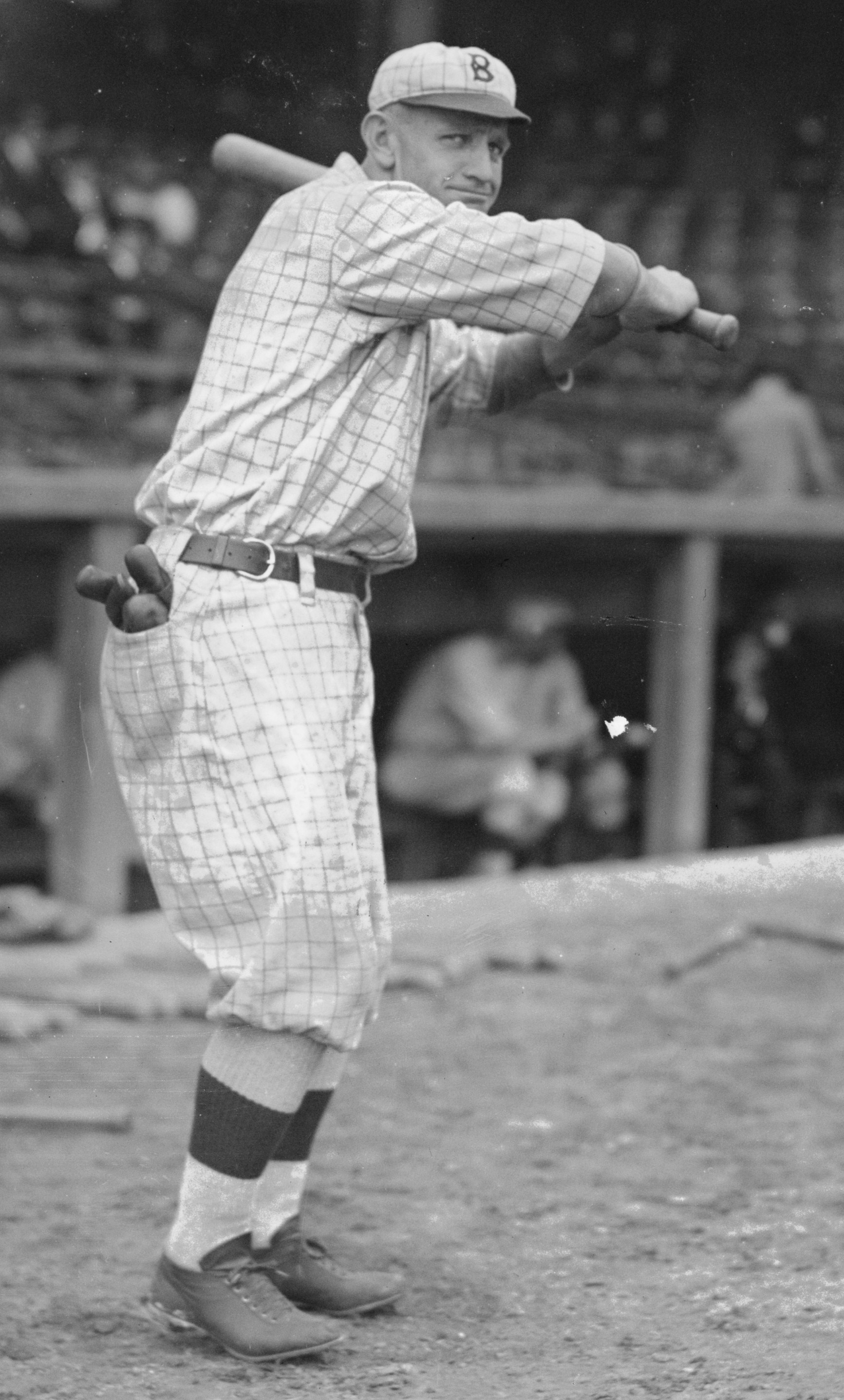
Casey Stengel was inducted into the Baseball Hall of Fame as a manager.

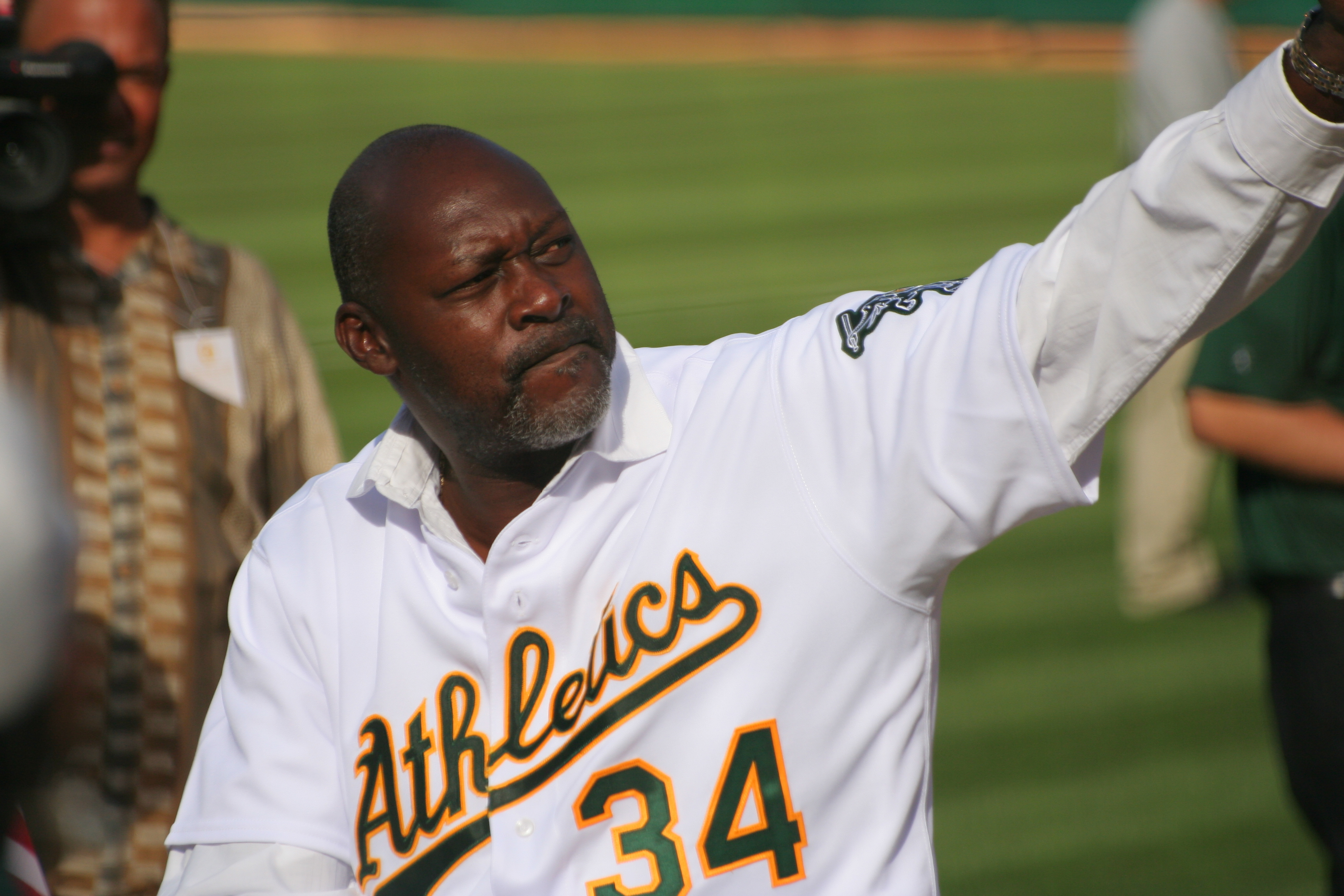
Dave Stewart struck out 11 batters and walked 8 in his two seasons with Philadelphia.

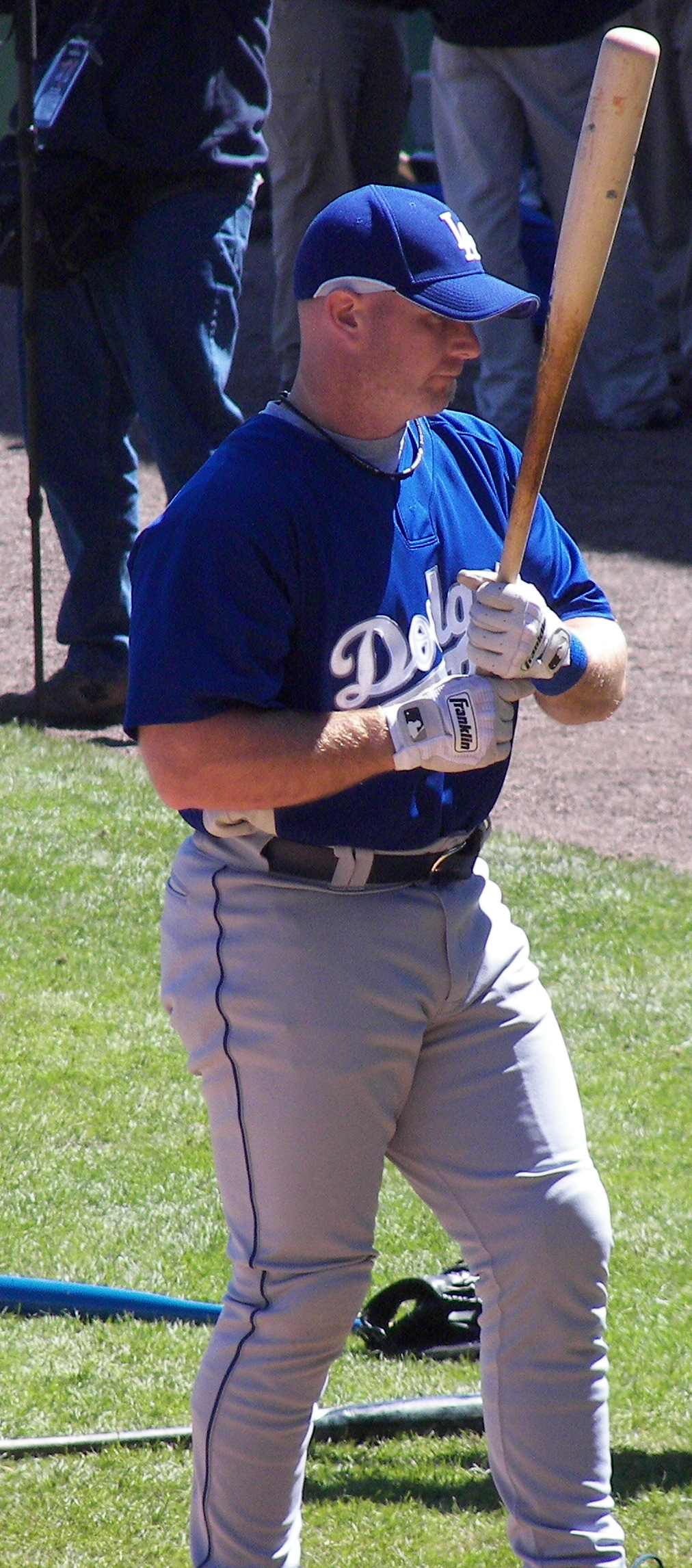
Kelly Stinnett batted .429 in his short tenure with the Phillies.

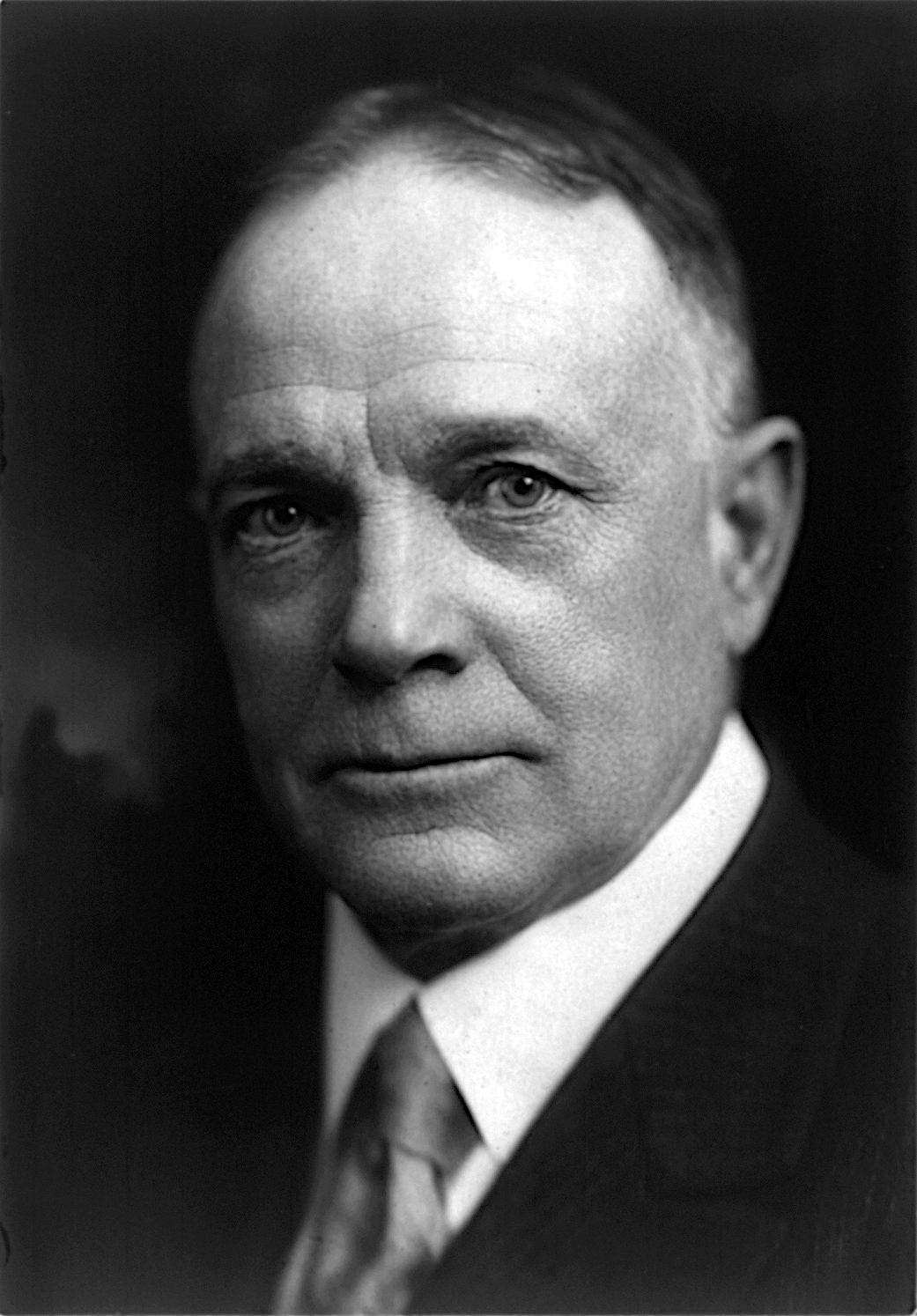
The aptly-named Billy Sunday left his baseball career to become a Christian minister.

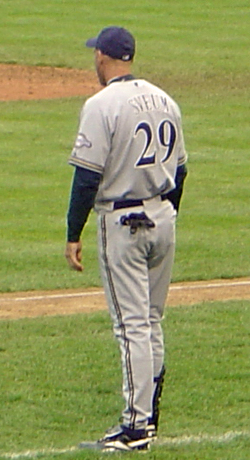
Dale Sveum batted .178 in his only Phillies season.

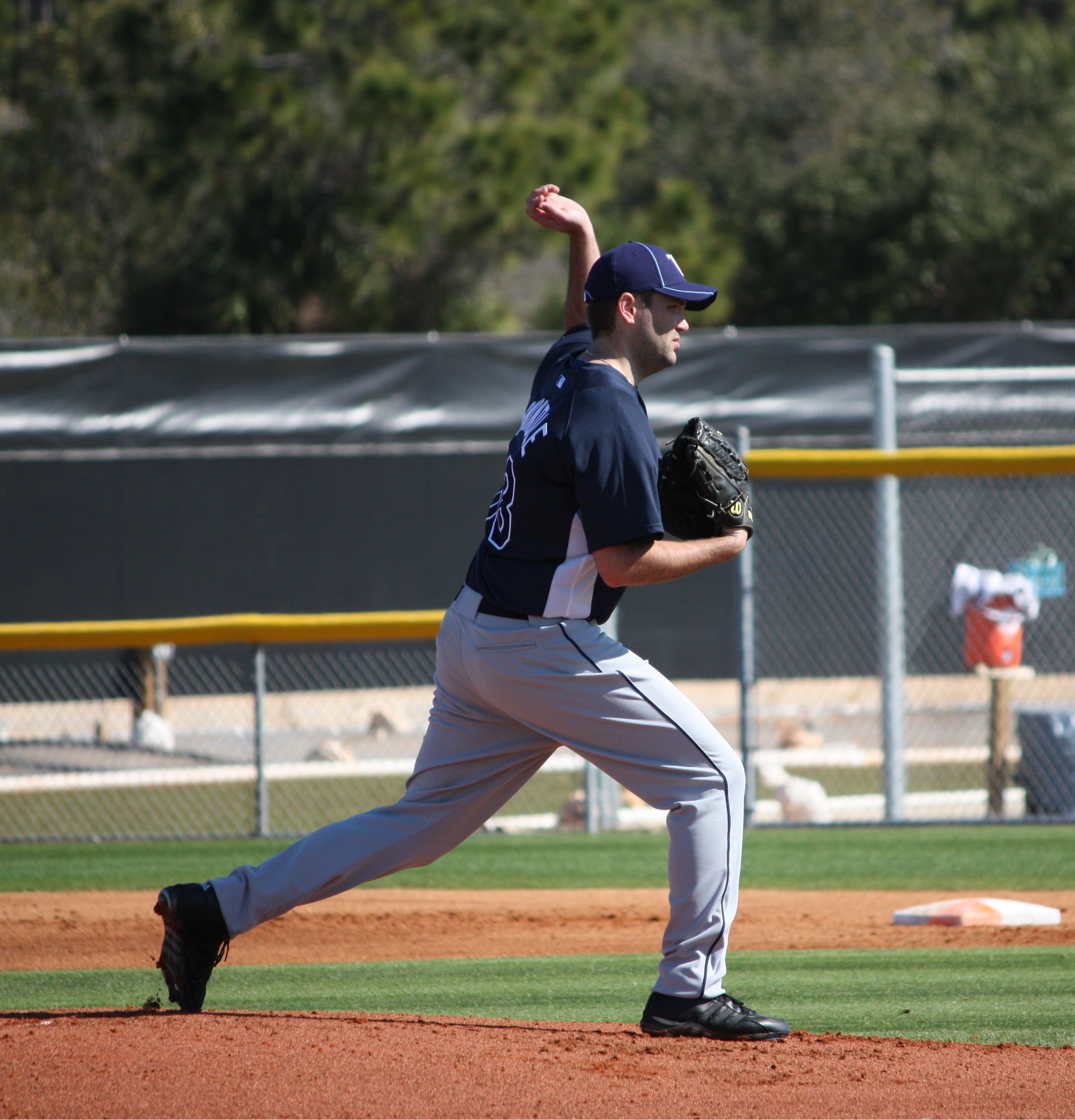
R. J. Swindle posted a 7.71 earned run average in 2008.

List of players whose surnames begin with S, showing season(s) and position(s) played and selected statistics
Name	Season(s)	Position(s)	Notes	Ref
Bob Sadowski	1961	Third baseman	.130 batting average; 1 run batted in; 4 runs scored	
Solly Salisbury	1902	Pitcher	13.50 earned run average; 2 walks; 10 runs allowed	
Manny Salvo	1943	Pitcher	27.00 earned run average; 1 walk; 1 run allowed	
Juan Samuel^{§}	1983–1989	Second baseman	.263 batting average; 100 home runs; 413 runs batted in	
Brian Sanches	2006–2007	Pitcher	1–1 record; 5.75 earned run average; 31 strikeouts	
Alejandro Sánchez	1982–1983	Right fielder	.286 batting average; 2 home runs; 6 runs batted in	
Heinie Sand	1923–1928	Shortstop	.258 batting average; 18 home runs; 251 runs batted in	
Ryne Sandberg^{†}	1981	Shortstop	.167 batting average; 2 runs scored; 6 plate appearances	
Ben Sanders	1888–1889	Pitcher	38–28 record; 2.82 earned run average; 244 strikeouts	
Danny Sandoval	2005–2006	Second baseman Shortstop	.200 batting average; 4 runs batted in; 2 runs scored	
Jack Sanford	1956–1958	Pitcher	30–21 record; 3.61 earned run average; 300 strikeouts	
Ed Sanicki	1949; 1951	Left fielder Right fielder	.294 batting average; 3 home runs; 8 runs batted in	
Julio Santana	2006	Pitcher	7.56 earned run average; 4 strikeouts; 9 walks	
Benito Santiago	1996	Catcher	.264 batting average; 30 home runs; 85 runs batted in	
José Santiago	2001–2002	Pitcher	3–7 record; 4.94 earned run average; 58 strikeouts	
Dane Sardinha	2010–2011	Catcher	.211 batting average; 3 home runs; 9 runs batted in	
Kevin Saucier	1978–1980	Pitcher	8–8 record; 4.09 earned run average; 48 strikeouts	
Jimmie Savage	1912	Second baseman	.000 batting average; 1 run scored; 1 walk	
Ted Savage	1962	Left fielder	.266 batting average; 7 home runs; 39 runs batted in	
Joe Savery	2011	Pitcher	2 2/3 innings pitched; 2 strikeouts; 1 hit allowed	
Carl Sawatski	1958–1959	Catcher	.262 batting average; 14 home runs; 55 runs batted in	
Phil Saylor	1891	Pitcher	6.00 earned run average; 2 runs allowed; 3 innings pitched	
Frank Scanlan	1909	Pitcher	1.64 earned run average; 5 strikeouts; 5 walks	
Mac Scarce	1972–1974	Pitcher	5–18 record; 3.65 earned run average; 147 strikeouts	
Russ Scarritt	1932	Left fielder	.182 batting average; 2 hits; 12 plate appearances	
Steve Scarsone	1992	Second baseman	.154 batting average; 2 hits; 1 run scored	
Jimmie Schaffer	1966–1967	Catcher	.118 batting average; 1 home run; 4 runs batted in	
Gene Schall	1995–1996	First baseman	.252 batting average; 2 home runs; 15 runs batted in	
Charley Schanz	1944–1947	Pitcher	25–41 record; 4.19 earned run average; 229 strikeouts	
George Scharein	1937–1940	Shortstop	.240 batting average; 61 extra-base hits; 119 runs batted in	
Dan Schatzeder	1986–1987	Pitcher	6–4 record; 3.76 earned run average; 42 strikeouts	
Jack Scheible	1894	Pitcher	0–1 record; 189.00 earned run average; 2 walks	
Danny Schell	1954–1955	Left fielder	.281 batting average; 7 home runs; 33 runs batted in	
Bill Scherrer	1988	Pitcher	5.40 earned run average; 3 strikeouts; 2 walks	
Dutch Schesler	1931	Pitcher	7.28 earned run average; 14 strikeouts; 18 walks	
Lou Schettler	1910	Pitcher	2–6 record; 3.20 earned run average; 62 strikeouts	
Curt Schilling	1992–2000	Pitcher	101–78 record; 3.35 earned run average; 1,554 strikeouts	
Freddy Schmidt	1947	Pitcher	5–8 record; 4.70 earned run average; 24 strikeouts	
Mike Schmidt^{‡§} (#20)	1972–1989	Third baseman	.267 batting average; 548 home runs*; 2,234 hits*; 1,595 runs batted in*; 4,404 total bases*	
Brian Schneider	2010–2011	Catcher	.208 batting average; 6 home runs; 24 runs batted in	
Gene Schott	1939	Pitcher	0–1 record; 4.91 earned run average; 1 strikeout	
Steve Schrenk	1999–2000	Pitcher	3–6 record; 5.25 earned run average; 55 strikeouts	
Pop Schriver	1888–1890	Catcher	.252 batting average; 2 home runs; 77 runs batted in	
Al Schroll	1959	Pitcher	1–1 record; 8.68 earned run average; 4 strikeouts	
Rick Schu	1984–1987; 1991	Third baseman	.250 batting average; 24 home runs; 79 runs batted in	
Ron Schueler	1974–1976	Pitcher	16–20 record; 4.01 earned run average; 221 strikeouts	
Wes Schulmerich	1933–1934	Left fielder	.324 batting average; 8 home runs; 60 runs batted in	
Frank Schulte	1917	Left fielder Right fielder	.215 batting average; 1 home run; 15 runs batted in	
Ham Schulte	1940	Second baseman	.236 batting average; 1 home run; 21 runs batted in	
Johnny Schulte	1928	Catcher	.248 batting average; 4 home runs; 17 runs batted in	
Howie Schultz	1947–1948	First baseman	.219 batting average; 6 home runs; 36 runs batted in	
Joe Schultz	1924–1925	Left fielder Right fielder	.293 batting average; 5 home runs; 37 runs batted in	
John Schultz	1891	Pitcher	0–1 record; 6.60 earned run average; 4 strikeouts	
Kyle Schwarber	2022-Present	Leftfielder; Designated Hitter		
Michael Schwimer	2011	Pitcher	1–1 record; 5.02 earned run average; 16 strikeouts	
Jack Scott	1927	Pitcher	9–21 record; 5.09 earned run average; 69 strikeouts	
Lefty Scott	1945	Pitcher	0–2 record; 4.43 earned run average; 5 strikeouts	
LeGrant Scott	1939	Right fielder	.280 batting average; 1 home run; 26 runs batted in	
Rudy Seánez	2008	Pitcher	5–4 record; 3.53 earned run average; 30 strikeouts	
Steve Searcy	1991–1992	Pitcher	2–1 record; 4.65 earned run average; 26 strikeouts	
Tom Seaton	1912–1913	Pitcher	43–24 record; 2.90 earned run average; 286 strikeouts	
Bob Sebra	1988–1989	Pitcher	3–5 record; 5.32 earned run average; 28 strikeouts	
Duke Sedgwick	1921	Pitcher	1–3 record; 4.92 earned run average; 21 strikeouts	
Kevin Sefcik	1995–2000	Left fielder	.275 batting average; 6 home runs; 56 runs batted in	
Zack Segovia	2007	Pitcher	0–1 record; 9.00 earned run average; 2 strikeouts	
Dick Selma	1970–1973	Pitcher	11–21 record; 3.93 earned run average; 230 strikeouts	
Andy Seminick	1943–1951; 1955–1957	Catcher	.244 batting average; 123 home runs; 411 runs batted in	
Ray Semproch	1958–1959	Pitcher	16–21 record; 4.44 earned run average; 146 strikeouts	
Paul Sentell	1906–1907	Third baseman Second baseman	.226 batting average; 1 home run; 14 runs batted in	
Manny Seoane	1977	Pitcher	6.00 earned run average; 4 strikeouts; 3 walks	
Scott Service	1988	Pitcher	1.69 earned run average; 6 strikeouts; 1 walk	
Bobby Shantz^{§}	1964	Pitcher	1–1 record; 2.25 earned run average; 18 strikeouts	
Jack Sharrott	1893	Left fielder	.250 batting average; 1 home run; 22 runs batted in	
Merv Shea	1944	Catcher	.267 batting average; 1 home run; 1 run batted in	
Nap Shea	1902	Catcher	.125 batting average; 1 hit; 1 run scored	
Dave Shean	1908–1909	Shortstop; Second baseman	.206 batting average; 6 extra-base hits; 6 runs batted in	
Chuck Sheerin	1936	Second baseman Third baseman	.264 batting average; 4 doubles; 4 runs batted in	
Keith Shepherd	1992	Pitcher	1–1 record; 3.27 earned run average; 10 strikeouts	
Monk Sherlock	1930	First baseman	.324 batting average; 20 extra-base hits; 38 runs batted in	
Ben Shields	1931	Pitcher	1–0 record; 15.19 earned run average; 7 walks	
Jim Shilling	1939	Second baseman	.303 batting average; 4 extra-base hits; 4 runs batted in	
Billy Shindle	1891	Third baseman	.210 batting average; 38 runs batted in; 68 runs scored	
Dave Shipanoff	1985	Pitcher	1–2 record; 3.22 earned run average; 26 strikeouts	
Costen Shockley	1964	First baseman	.229 batting average; 1 home run; 2 runs batted in	
Chris Short^{§}	1959–1972	Pitcher	132–127 record; 3.38 earned run average; 1,585 strikeouts	
Frank Shugart	1897	Shortstop	.252 batting average; 5 home runs; 25 runs batted in	
Toots Shultz	1911–1912	Pitcher	1–7 record; 6.00 earned run average; 29 strikeouts	
Anthony Shumaker	1999	Pitcher	0–3 record; 5.96 earned run average; 17 strikeouts	
Harry Shuman	1944	Pitcher	4.05 earned run average; 4 strikeouts; 11 walks	
Ed Sicking	1919	Shortstop; Second baseman	.216 batting average; 3 extra-base hits; 15 runs batted in	
Roy Sievers	1962–1964	First baseman	.244 batting average; 44 home runs; 178 runs batted in	
Tripp Sigman	1929–1930	Center fielder	.326 batting average; 6 home runs; 15 runs batted in	
Carlos Silva	2002–2003	Pitcher	8–1 record; 3.83 earned run average; 89 strikeouts	
Ken Silvestri	1949–1951	Catcher	.212 batting average; 1 triple; 5 runs batted in	
Curt Simmons^{§}	1947–1950; 1952–1960	Pitcher	115–110 record; 3.66 earned run average; 1,052 strikeouts	
Randall Simon	2006	Pinch hitter^{[a]}	.238 batting average; 5 hits; 2 runs batted in	
Wayne Simpson	1975	Pitcher	1–0 record; 3.23 earned run average; 19 strikeouts	
John Singleton	1922	Pitcher	1–10 record; 5.90 earned run average; 27 strikeouts	
Dick Sisler	1948–1951	Left fielder First baseman	.287 batting average; 39 home runs; 241 runs batted in	
Pete Sivess	1936–1938	Pitcher	7–11 record; 5.38 earned run average; 58 strikeouts	
Ed Sixsmith	1884	Catcher	.000 batting average; 2 plate appearances	
Ted Sizemore	1977–1978	Second baseman	.256 batting average; 4 home runs; 72 runs batted in	
Jimmy Slagle	1900–1901	Left fielder	.267 batting average; 34 extra-base hits; 65 runs batted in	
Barney Slaughter	1910	Pitcher	0–1 record; 5.50 earned run average; 7 strikeouts	
Heathcliff Slocumb	1994–1995	Pitcher	10–7 record; 2.88 earned run average; 121 strikeouts	
Roy Smalley	1955–1958	Shortstop	.204 batting average; 8 home runs; 56 runs batted in	
Al Smith	1938–1939	Pitcher	1–4 record; 6.06 earned run average; 48 strikeouts	
Bill Smith	1962	Pitcher	1–5 record; 4.29 earned run average; 26 strikeouts	
Bob Smith	1960–1961	Left fielder	.271 batting average; 6 home runs; 45 runs batted in	
Charley Smith	1961	Third baseman	.248 batting average; 9 home runs; 47 runs batted in	
Edgar Smith	1883	Pitcher; Left fielder	0–1 record; 15.43 earned run average; .750 batting average; 1 run batted in	
George Smith	1919–1922	Pitcher	27–63 record; 4.04 earned run average; 182 strikeouts	
Jake Smith	1911	Pitcher	1 strikeout; 2 walks; 5 innings pitched	
Jimmy Smith	1921–1922	Second baseman	.227 batting average; 5 home runs; 28 runs batted in	
Lonnie Smith	1978–1981	Left fielder Right fielder	.321 batting average; 5 home runs; 34 runs batted in	
Matt Smith	2006–2007	Pitcher	0–1 record; 4.97 earned run average; 13 strikeouts	
Phenomenal Smith	1890; 1891	Pitcher	9–13 record; 4.28 earned run average; 84 strikeouts	
Tom Smith	1895	Pitcher	2–3 record; 6.88 earned run average; 21 strikeouts	
Lefty Smoll	1940	Pitcher	2–8 record; 5.37 earned run average; 31 strikeouts	
Harry Smythe	1929–1930	Pitcher	4–9 record; 6.31 earned run average; 21 strikeouts	
Chris Snelling	2008	Pinch hitter^{[b]}	.500 batting average; 1 home run; 1 run batted in	
Bill Sorrell	1965	Third baseman	.385 batting average; 1 home run; 2 runs batted in	
Denny Sothern	1926; 1928–1930	Center fielder	.287 batting average; 18 home runs; 111 runs batted in	
Dick Spalding	1927	Left fielder	.296 batting average; 19 extra-base hits; 26 runs batted in	
Tully Sparks	1897; 1903–1910	Pitcher	95–95 record; 2.48 earned run average; 586 strikeouts	
By Speece	1930	Pitcher	13.27 earned run average; 9 strikeouts; 4 walks	
Tubby Spencer	1911	Catcher	.156 batting average; 1 home run; 3 runs batted in	
Stan Sperry	1936	Second baseman	.135 batting average; 3 doubles; 4 runs batted in	
Hal Spindel	1945–1946	Catcher	.233 batting average; 3 doubles; 9 runs batted in	
Paul Spoljaric	1999	Pitcher	0–3 record; 15.09 earned run average; 10 strikeouts	
Jim Spotts	1930	Catcher	.000 batting average; 2 plate appearances; 1 strikeout	
Jerry Spradlin	1997–1998	Pitcher	8–12 record; 4.13 earned run average; 143 strikeouts	
Homer Spragins	1947	Pitcher	6.75 earned run average; 3 strikeouts; 3 walks	
Jack Spring	1955	Pitcher	0–1 record; 6.75 earned run average; 2 strikeouts	
Dennis Springer	1995	Pitcher	0–3 record; 4.84 earned run average; 15 strikeouts	
Russ Springer	1995–1996	Pitcher	3–10 record; 4.45 earned run average; 126 strikeouts	
Charlie Sproull	1945	Pitcher	4–10 record; 5.94 earned run average; 47 strikeouts	
Eddie Stack	1910–1911	Pitcher	11–12 record; 3.84 earned run average; 84 strikeouts	
Tuck Stainback	1938	Left fielder Right fielder	.259 batting average; 1 home run; 11 runs batted in	
Matt Stairs	2008–2009	Right fielder Left fielder	.208 batting average; 7 home runs; 22 runs batted in	
George Stallings	1897–1898	First baseman Right fielder	.222 batting average; 1 double; 2 runs scored	
Charley Stanceu	1946	Pitcher	2–4 record; 4.22 earned run average; 23 strikeouts	
Steve Stanicek	1989	Pinch hitter^{[c]}	.111 batting average; 1 hit; 1 run batted in	
Buck Stanley	1911	Pitcher	6.35 earned run average; 5 strikeouts; 9 walks	
Charlie Starr	1909	Pinch hitter^{[d]}	.000 batting average; 3 plate appearances	
John Stearns	1974	Catcher	.500 batting average; 1 hit; 2 plate appearances	
Morrie Steevens	1964–1965	Pitcher	0–1 record; 10.13 earned run average; 6 strikeouts	
Justin Stein	1938	Third baseman Second baseman	.256 batting average; 1 triple; 2 runs batted in	
Gene Steinbrenner	1912	Second baseman	.222 batting average; 1 double; 1 run batted in	
Ray Steineder	1924	Pitcher	1–1 record; 4.40 earned run average; 11 strikeouts	
Casey Stengel^{†}	1920–1921	Right fielder	.294 batting average; 9 home runs; 54 runs batted in	
Dummy Stephenson	1892	Center fielder	.270 batting average; 3 doubles; 5 runs batted in	
Garrett Stephenson	1997–1998	Pitcher	8–8 record; 4.11 earned run average; 98 strikeouts	
Walter Stephenson	1937	Catcher	.261 batting average; 2 runs batted in; 1 run scored	
Bobby Stevens	1931	Shortstop	.343 batting average; 4 runs batted in; 3 runs scored	
Dave Stewart	1985–1986	Pitcher	6.48 earned run average; 11 strikeouts; 8 walks	
Glen Stewart	1943–1944	Shortstop; Third baseman	.216 batting average; 2 home runs; 53 runs batted in	
Neb Stewart	1940	Left fielder	.129 batting average; 4 hits; 3 runs scored	
Kelly Stinnett	2003	Catcher	.429 batting average; 3 hits; 8 plate appearances	
Milt Stock	1915–1918	Third baseman	.271 batting average; 95 extra-base hits; 153 runs batted in	
Kevin Stocker	1993–1997	Shortstop	.262 batting average; 14 home runs; 172 runs batted in	
Gene Stone	1969	First baseman	.214 batting average; 1 triple; 4 runs scored	
Jeff Stone	1983–1987	Left fielder	.291 batting average; 11 home runs; 64 runs batted in	
Ron Stone	1969–1972	Right fielder Left fielder	.240 batting average; 6 home runs; 89 runs batted in	
Lil Stoner	1931	Pitcher	6.59 earned run average; 2 strikeouts; 5 walks	
Ray Stoviak	1938	Right fielder	.000 batting average; 1 run scored; 10 plate appearances	
John Strike	1886	Pitcher; Right fielder	1–1 record; 4.80 earned run average; .000 batting average; 7 plate appearances	
Nick Strincevich	1948	Pitcher	0–1 record; 9.18 earned run average; 4 strikeouts	
Dick Stuart	1965	First baseman	.234 batting average; 28 home runs; 95 runs batted in	
Michael Stutes	2011	Pitcher	6–2 record; 3.63 earned run average; 58 strikeouts	
Paul Stuffel	1950; 1952–1953	Pitcher	1–0 record; 5.73 earned run average; 6 strikeouts	
George Stutz	1926	Shortstop	.000 batting average; 2 strikeouts; 9 plate appearances	
Gus Suhr	1939–1940	First baseman	.300 batting average; 5 home runs; 29 runs batted in	
Ernie Sulik	1936	Center fielder Left fielder	.287 batting average; 6 home runs; 36 runs batted in	
Frank Sullivan	1961–1962	Pitcher	3–18 record; 4.54 earned run average; 126 strikeouts	
Joe Sullivan	1894–1896	Shortstop	.324 batting average; 7 home runs; 137 runs batted in	
John Sullivan	1968	Catcher	.222 batting average; 4 hits; 1 run batted in	
Tom Sullivan	1922	Pitcher	11.25 earned run average; 2 strikeouts; 5 walks	
Billy Sunday	1890	Center fielder	.261 batting average; 6 runs batted in; 26 runs scored	
Rick Surhoff	1985	Pitcher	1–0 record; 0.00 earned run average; 1 strikeout	
George Susce	1929	Catcher	.294 batting average; 1 home run; 1 run batted in	
Gary Sutherland	1966–1968	Shortstop	.255 batting average; 21 extra-base hits; 34 runs batted in	
Jack Sutthoff	1904–1905	Pitcher	9–17 record; 3.73 earned run average; 72 strikeouts	
Dale Sveum	1992	Shortstop	.178 batting average; 2 home runs; 16 runs batted in	
Mike Sweeney	2010	First baseman	.231 batting average; 2 home runs; 8 runs batted in	
Les Sweetland	1927–1930	Pitcher	25–51 record; 6.33 earned run average; 127 strikeouts	
R. J. Swindle	2008	Pitcher	7.71 earned run average; 4 strikeouts; 2 walks	

== Footnotes ==
Key

- ^{H} The National Baseball Hall of Fame and Museum determines which cap a player wears on their plaque, signifying "the team with which he made his most indelible mark". The Hall of Fame considers the player's wishes in making their decision, but the Hall makes the final decision as "it is important that the logo be emblematic of the historical accomplishments of that player's career".
- ^{P} Players are listed at a position if they appeared in 30% of their games or more during their Phillies career, as defined by Baseball-Reference.com. Additional positions may be shown on the Baseball-Reference website by following each player's citation.
- ^{R} Franchise batting and pitching leaders are drawn from Baseball-Reference.com. A total of 1,500 plate appearances are needed to qualify for batting records, and 500 innings pitched or 50 decisions are required to qualify for pitching records.
- ^{S} Statistics are correct as of the end of the 2010 Major League Baseball season.

Table

- ^{a} Randall Simon is listed by Baseball-Reference as a first baseman, but never appeared in a game in the field for the Phillies.
- ^{b} Chris Snelling is listed by Baseball-Reference as an outfielder, but never appeared in a game in the field for the Phillies.
- ^{c} Steve Stanicek is listed by Baseball-Reference as a pinch hitter; he never appeared in a game in the field during his major league career.
- ^{d} Charlie Starr is listed by Baseball-Reference as a second baseman, shortstop, and third baseman, but never appeared in a game in the field for the Phillies.
