= Dan McGann =

American baseball player (1871–1910)

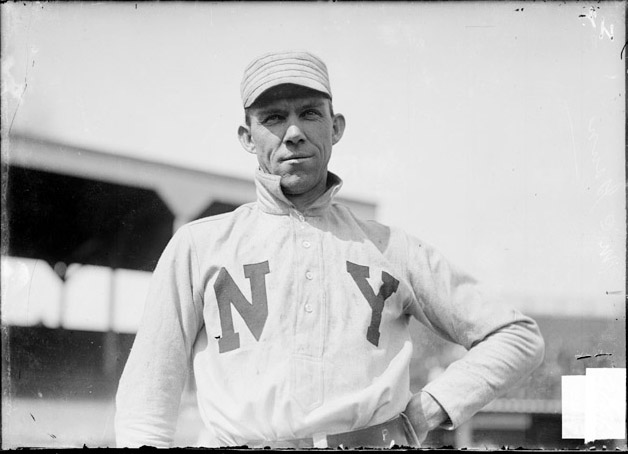
- McGann with the New York Giants in 1905
- First baseman
- Born: July 15, 1871; Shelbyville, Kentucky, U.S.
- Died: December 13, 1910 (aged 39); Louisville, Kentucky, U.S.
- Batted: Switch Threw: Right

MLB debut
- August 8, 1896, for the Boston Beaneaters

Last MLB appearance
- October 7, 1908, for the Boston Doves

MLB statistics
- Batting average: .284
- Home runs: 42
- Runs batted in: 727
- Stats at Baseball Reference

Teams
- Boston Beaneaters (1896); Baltimore Orioles (NL) (1898); Brooklyn Superbas (1899); Washington Senators (1899); St. Louis Cardinals (1900–1901); Baltimore Orioles (AL) (1902); New York Giants (1902–1907); Boston Doves (1908)

Career highlights and awards
- World Series champion (1905)

Dennis Lawrence "Dan" McGann (July 15, 1871 – December 13, 1910) was an American professional baseball first baseman and second baseman. He played in Major League Baseball (MLB) from 1896 to 1910, and won the World Series in 1905 with the New York Giants.

After beginning his professional career in minor league baseball in 1895, McGann played in MLB for the Boston Beaneaters (1896), Baltimore Orioles (1898), Brooklyn Superbas (1899), Washington Senators (1899), and St. Louis Cardinals (1900–1901) of the National League (NL) before jumping to the rival American League to play for the Baltimore Orioles in 1902. He returned to the NL, playing for the New York Giants (1902–1907) and Boston Doves (1908). In 1909–10, he played for the Milwaukee Brewers in the American Association.

McGann had a troubled personal life. He suffered from depression, and several members of his family committed suicide. After the 1910 season, with rumors of McGann signing with another minor league team, McGann committed suicide with a firearm.

== Career ==
=== Early career (1891–1897) ===
McGann began his professional baseball career in minor league baseball with a team representing his hometown, Shelbyville, Kentucky, in 1891. He also played for Kentucky teams representing Harrodsburg in 1892, Lexington in 1893, and Maysville in 1894. McGann played for the Norfolk Clams/Crows of the Class-B Virginia State League in 1895 and the Lynchburg Hill Climbers of the Class-B Virginia League in 1896. He initially played all positions except for pitcher, catcher, and first baseman.

In August 1896, the Boston Beaneaters of the National League (NL) purchased McGann from Lynchburg to fill in for injured second baseman Bobby Lowe. McGann batted .322 with the Beaneaters, hitting for power, but he committed 21 errors in 43 games. The Beaneaters released him following the completion of the season. McGann played the 1897 season with the Toronto Canucks of the Class-A Eastern League. He moved to first base and batted .354, leading the Eastern League with 20 triples.

=== Major League Baseball (1898–1908) ===
The Washington Senators of the NL purchased McGann, Butts Wagner, Bob McHale and Cooney Snyder from Toronto for $8,500 ($328,950 in current dollar terms) on September 22, 1897. The Senators traded McGann with Gene DeMontreville and Doc McJames to the Baltimore Orioles of the NL for Doc Amole, Jack Doyle and Heinie Reitz that December. He played one season with the Orioles, in which he batted .301 with 106 runs batted in (RBI) in 1898, good for fifth place in the NL.

When Orioles manager Ned Hanlon was hired to manage the Brooklyn Superbas during the 1899 season, receiving an ownership stake in the team to do so, he assigned several of his star players, including McGann, Joe McGinnity, Joe Kelley, Hughie Jennings and Willie Keeler to the Superbas. McGann finished second on the team in RBIs with 106, behind Kelley.

McGann batted .243 for the Superbas through July 14, 1899, when they traded him with Aleck Smith to the Senators for Deacon McGuire. For the Senators, McGann batted .343 during the rest of the 1899 season. Short on money, the Senators sold McGann and Gus Weyhing to the St. Louis Cardinals for $5,000 ($193,500 in current dollar terms) on March 9, 1900. McGann left the Cardinals before the end of 1901 season, for unknown reasons. The Cardinals replaced McGann with Bill Richardson.

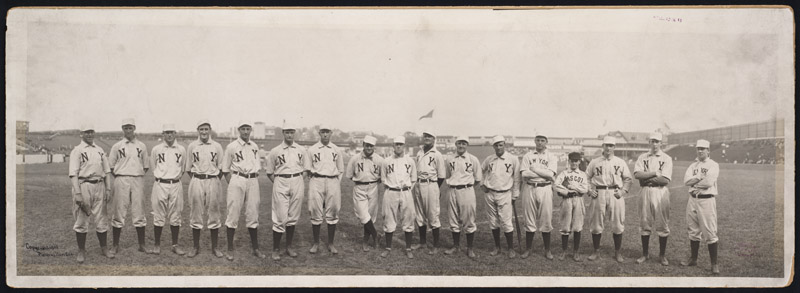
McGann (seventh from left) with the New York Giants before the 1905 World Series

With the formation of the American League (AL) as a competitor to the NL, McGann joined many fellow NL players who jumped to the AL. Following Cardinals teammate John McGraw, who became player-manager of the Baltimore Orioles of the AL before the 1901 season, McGann signed with the Orioles.

However, the Orioles struggled with debt. Joe Kelley, star player for the Orioles and son-in-law of part-owner John Mahon, reported that the team owed as much as $12,000 ($446,538 in current dollar terms). Unable to afford that debt, Mahon purchased shares of the team from Kelley and John McGraw. With this, Mahon became the majority shareholder, owning 201 of the team's 400 shares. On July 17, 1902, Mahon sold his interest in the Orioles to Andrew Freedman, principal owner of the New York Giants, and John T. Brush, principal owner of the Cincinnati Reds, also of the NL. That day, Freedman released McGann, McGraw, Cy Seymour, Roger Bresnahan, Joe Kelley, Joe McGinnity, and Jack Cronin from their contracts with Orioles. Freedman signed McGann, Bresnahan, McGinnity and Cronin to the Giants, joining McGraw, who had signed with the Giants ten days earlier. Brush signed Seymour and Kelley to the Reds.

With the Giants, McGraw installed McGann at first base, moving Christy Mathewson to pitcher. McGann stole 36 bases in the 1903 season. After the season, McGann and some of his Giants teammates threatened to quit the team due to the treatment of Brush, now the Giants owner, for allegedly going back on a promise to provide the Giants with a monetary bonus for having the Giants finish in the top three of the NL and a share of the gate receipts from exhibition games, in which they were paid $56.35 ($2,019 in current dollar terms), though Brush allegedly had made over $200,000 ($7,166,667 in current dollar terms). McGann and Jack Warner were rumored to join McGinnity in an outlaw league in California.

McGann stole 42 bases in 1904, finishing fourth in the NL. He stole five bases on May 27, 1904, setting an NL record. McGann's record stood until Davey Lopes stole five bases in a game in 1974, and Otis Nixon stole six in a game in 1991. McGann led the team with a .286 batting average and six home runs that season. Though the Giants won the NL pennant in 1904, they refused to compete in the 1904 World Series. Brush and McGraw refused to face the AL champion Boston Americans, following their altercations with Johnson.

McGann developed a reputation as a fighter in 1905. On April 21, 1905, in a game against the Philadelphia Phillies, McGann punched catcher Fred Abbott after McGann was thrown out at home plate. Abbott hit McGann in the back with the ball, resulting in both players being ejected from the game. McGann batted .299 with 14 triples in 1905 as the Giants won NL pennant for the second consecutive year. Competing in the 1905 World Series, a series the Giants won over the Philadelphia Athletics in five games, McGann contributed with his bat and glove. Although McGann batted .235 in the series, he recorded four RBIs on three hits in a Game Three victory.

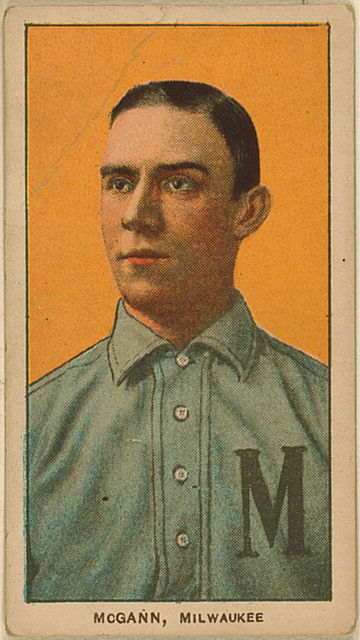
McGann's American Tobacco Company baseball card

McGann was briefly suspended by NL president Harry Pulliam for fighting on May 16, 1906. McGann finished first in the NL fielding percentage at first base from 1903 through 1906. He also served as Giants' team captain. Despite this, rumors began to circulate that the Giants were looking to trade McGann, which the team denied.

Before the 1907 season, a report surfaced that the Giants would shift Mike Donlin from the outfield to first base, in order to replace McGann. Donlin denied the claim. McGann suffered a broken wrist when he was hit by a pitch thrown by Andy Coakley of the Cincinnati Reds during spring training in 1907.

McGann returned to the Giants out of shape midway through the 1907 season, although he did bat .298 that season. That winter, trade rumours began to swirl that the Giants would trade him to the Reds. Instead, the Giants traded McGann to the Boston Doves with Frank Bowerman, George Browne, Bill Dahlen and Cecil Ferguson for Al Bridwell, Tom Needham and Fred Tenney on December 13, 1907. Tenney, also a first baseman, was designated as McGann's replacement at first. When a reporter asked McGraw about McGann and Tenney, pointing out that both first basemen were 36 years old, McGraw replied that Tenney had taken better care of himself.

Despite discussion of appointing McGann player-manager of the Doves, the role was assigned to Kelley. Agreeing to terms with George Dovey, president of the Doves, McGann played 135 games during the 1908 season, but batted only .240. During an April 1908 game between the Doves and the Giants, McGraw insulted McGann as slow, referring to him as a "damned ice wagon", noting "that's how the Giants lost a lot of games last season". After the game, McGann went to the Giants' hotel, waited for McGraw to return from the theatre, and fought him in a billiard room. Dovey released McGann from the Doves after the 1908 season.

=== Later career (1909–1910) ===
McGann signed with the Milwaukee Brewers of the Class-A American Association for the 1909 season. He played for Milwaukee in 1909 and 1910, batting only .225 in 1910, his career low. There were reports McGann might sign with the Oakland Oaks of the Pacific Coast League or a team in Louisville, Kentucky, near his Shelbyville home in 1911. McGann's career was ended, however, by his death in December 1910.

=== Career statistics ===
In 1437 games over 12 seasons, McGann posted a .284 batting average (1482-for-5226) with 842 runs, 181 doubles, 100 triples, 42 home runs, 727 RBI, 282 stolen bases, 429 bases on balls, .364 on-base percentage and .381 slugging percentage. He finished his career with a .987 fielding percentage playing 1377 games at first base and 53 games at second base.

== Personal life ==
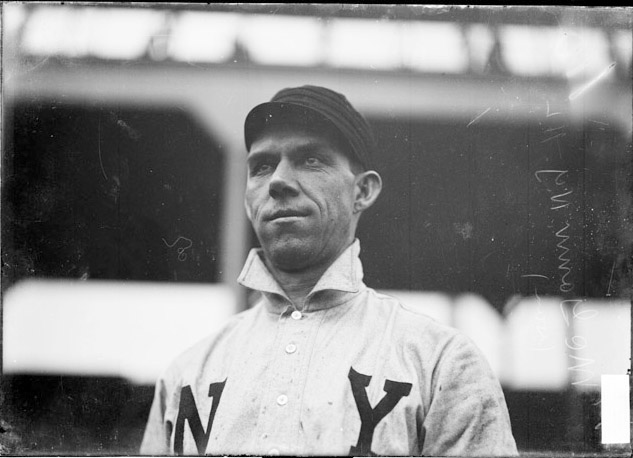
Cap McGann with the New York Giants in 1905

McGann invested in real estate and financial holdings near his Shelbyville home during his career. At the time of his death, his property was assessed to be worth approximately $40,000 ($1,382,143 in current dollar terms).

== Family ==
McGann suffered from severe clinical depression, a condition which ran throughout his family. One of McGann's sisters committed suicide in 1889 after their mother died. On New Year's Eve in 1901, one of McGann's brothers died as a result of an accidental shooting. In 1910, another of McGann's brothers committed suicide.

== Death ==
On December 13, 1910, McGann committed suicide by shooting himself in the heart at a Louisville hotel. At the time of his death, he was 39 years old, and reportedly had been "in the best of health and humor" when last seen. McGann was survived by two sisters, who, despite the family history of suicide, believed their brother had been murdered, as a diamond ring valued at $800 ($27,643 in current dollar terms) McGann had been seen wearing was missing.

== See also ==
- List of baseball players who died during their careers
- List of Major League Baseball career triples leaders
- List of Major League Baseball career stolen bases leaders
