= Jake Smith (pitcher, born 1887) =

American baseball player (1887–1948)

- Pitcher
- Born: June 10, 1887; Dravosburg, Pennsylvania, U.S.
- Died: November 7, 1948 (aged 61); East McKeesport, Pennsylvania, U.S.
- Batted: Switch Threw: Left

MLB debut
- October 3, 1911, for the Philadelphia Phillies

Last MLB appearance
- October 9, 1911, for the Philadelphia Phillies

MLB statistics
- Earned run average: 0.00
- Strikeouts: 1
- Walks: 2
- Stats at Baseball Reference

Teams
- Philadelphia Phillies (1911)

Jacob John Smith (June 10, 1887 – November 7, 1948) was an American professional baseball player. As a relief pitcher, Smith appeared in two games for the Philadelphia Phillies in Major League Baseball's National League during the 1911 season. He was officially listed as standing 6 feet 5 inches (196 cm) and weighing 200 pounds (91 kg).

== Biography ==
Smith was born "Jacob Schmidt" on June 10, 1887, in Dravosburg, Pennsylvania.

In 1911, Smith played two games for the Philadelphia Phillies. In his two games as a pitcher, he finished both games in which he played, meaning that he completed the final inning in each. He threw a total of five innings in those contests. He faced 19 batters, struck out one, and walked two. Having allowed three hits to supplement his two free passes, he amassed a WHIP ratio (walks plus hits per inning pitched) of 1.000.

As a hitter, Smith made three plate appearances in his two games. He did not collect any hits in those three times at bat, but did earn a single run batted in. While fielding on the mound, Smith had a perfect 1.000 fielding percentage, with two assists on two fielding chances.

Smith died on November 7, 1948, at the age of 61, in East McKeesport, Pennsylvania, just across the river from his hometown. He was interred in Grandview Cemetery in McKeesport, Pennsylvania.

== See also ==
- Philadelphia Phillies all-time roster (S)
- "Cup of coffee" — a short stint at the major league level of a sport
- List of people from the Pittsburgh metropolitan area
