= Harry Smith (1900s catcher) =

American baseball player (1874–1933)

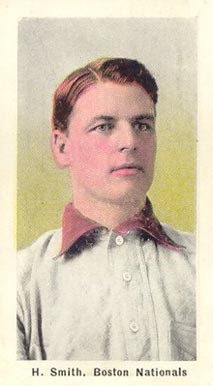
- Catcher
- Born: October 31, 1874; Yorkshire, England
- Died: February 17, 1933 (aged 58); Salem, New Jersey, U.S.
- Batted: Right Threw: Right

MLB debut
- July 11, 1901, for the Philadelphia Athletics

Last MLB appearance
- September 15, 1910, for the Boston Doves

MLB statistics
- Batting average: .213
- Home runs: 2
- Runs batted in: 89
- Stats at Baseball Reference

Teams
- As player: Philadelphia Athletics (1901); Pittsburgh Pirates (1902–07); Boston Doves (1908–10); As manager: Boston Doves (1909)

Harry Thomas Smith (October 31, 1874 – February 17, 1933) was an American professional baseball player and manager. He played in Major League Baseball as a catcher from 1901 to 1910.

== Baseball career ==
Smith was born in October 31, 1874 in Yorkshire, England. He played as a back-up catcher for Pittsburgh Pirates (1902–07, 178 games) and Boston Doves (1907–11, 154 games), after starting at Philadelphia Athletics for 11 games. Smith had planned to retire as a player and become a scout in 1909 but, when manager Frank Bowerman resigned in mid-July, the Doves named him as a player-manager for the remainder of the season. He was replaced as manager by Fred Lake for the 1910 season but, remained on as a catcher. He played in his final major league game in 1910 at the age of 35.

== Career statistics ==
In a ten-year major league career, Smith played in 343 games, accumulating 214 hits in 1,004 at bats for a .213 career batting average along with 2 home runs, 89 runs batted in and an on-base percentage of .262. He had a .967 career fielding percentage as a catcher during his career. He was a strong defensive catcher with a 47.32 career caught stealing percentage that ranks 50th among all major league catchers.

== Minor league managerial career ==
After his playing career went on to manage in the Minor Leagues for several seasons.

== See also ==
- List of Major League Baseball player–managers
