= Charlie Maloney =

American baseball player (1886–1967)

- Pitcher
- Born: May 22, 1886; Cambridge, Massachusetts, U.S.
- Died: January 17, 1967 (aged 80); Arlington, Massachusetts, U.S.
- Batted: Right Threw: Right

MLB debut
- August 10, 1908, for the Boston Doves

Last MLB appearance
- August 10, 1908, for the Boston Doves

MLB statistics
- Win–loss record: 0–0
- Earned run average: 4.50
- Strikeouts: 0
- Stats at Baseball Reference

Teams
- Boston Doves (1908)

Charles Michael Maloney (May 22, 1886 – January 17, 1967) was an American professional baseball player who pitched in the Major Leagues for the Boston Doves. He went to college at Boston College.
