= Bobby Stevens =

American baseball player (1907-2005)

- Shortstop
- Born: April 17, 1907; Chevy Chase, Maryland, U.S.
- Died: December 30, 2005 (aged 98); Frederick, Maryland, U.S.
- Batted: Left Threw: Right

MLB debut
- July 3, 1931, for the Philadelphia Phillies

Last MLB appearance
- August 5, 1931, for the Philadelphia Phillies

MLB statistics
- Batting average: .343
- Home runs: 0
- Runs batted in: 4
- Stats at Baseball Reference

Teams
- Philadelphia Phillies (1931)

Robert Jordan Stevens (April 17, 1907 – December 30, 2005) was an American professional baseball player who played in twelve games for the Philadelphia Phillies during the 1931 season.

He played 12 games in 1931, hitting .343 in 35 at-bats with four runs batted in. His baseball career also included time in the Carolina League. He was honored at Veterans Stadium in August 2000 and helped to unveil a plaque to be placed at the site of the original Baker Bowl ballpark. The park had been used until the 1938 season. During World War II, he served in the Army Air Corps. Following his career in baseball, he worked in the accounting department of the Veterans Administration. He later drove the bookmobile for the Montgomery County Public Library until his retirement in 1977. He was a Little League baseball coach from 1960 to 1967.

Stevens died of heart failure in December 2005 at the age of 98.
