= Bill Dam =

American baseball player (1885-1930)

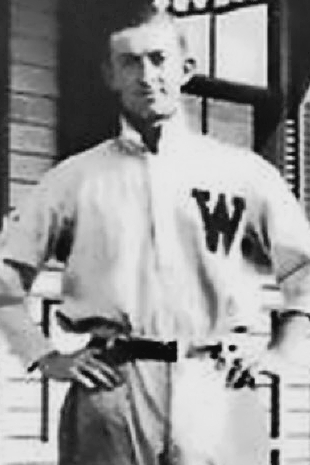
- Left fielder
- Born: April 4, 1885; Cambridge, Massachusetts, U.S.
- Died: June 22, 1930 (aged 45); Quincy, Massachusetts, U.S.
- Batted: Left Threw: Left

MLB debut
- August 23, 1909, for the Boston Doves

Last MLB appearance
- August 23, 1909, for the Boston Doves

MLB statistics
- Batting average: .500
- Home runs: 0
- Runs batted in: 0
- Stats at Baseball Reference

Teams
- Boston Doves (1909)

Elbridge Rust Dam (April 4, 1885 – June 22, 1930) was an American former Major League Baseball player. He played one game with the Boston Doves on August 23, 1909, going 1-for-2 with a double and a walk in three plate appearances.
