= Joe Sullivan (shortstop) =

American baseball player (1870–1897)

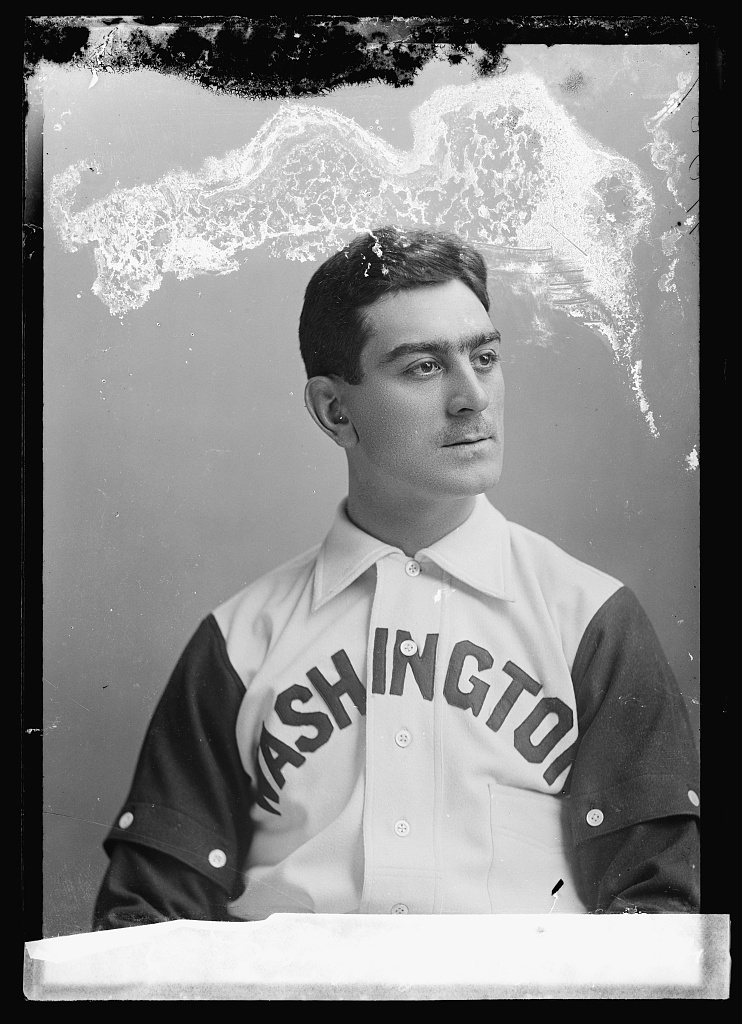
- Sullivan in Washington Senators uniform
- Shortstop
- Born: January 6, 1870; Charlestown, Massachusetts, U.S.
- Died: November 2, 1897 (aged 27); Charlestown, Massachusetts, U.S.
- Batted: Unknown Threw: Unknown

MLB debut
- April 27, 1893, for the Washington Senators

Last MLB appearance
- September 26, 1896, for the St. Louis Browns

MLB statistics
- Batting average: .299
- Home runs: 11
- Runs batted in: 227
- Stats at Baseball Reference

Teams
- Washington Senators (1893–1894); Philadelphia Phillies (1894–1896); St. Louis Browns (1896)

Joseph Daniel Sullivan (January 6, 1870 – November 2, 1897) was an American shortstop in Major League Baseball from 1893 to 1896. He played for the Washington Senators, Philadelphia Phillies, and St. Louis Browns.
