= Gus Getz =

American baseball player (1889–1969)

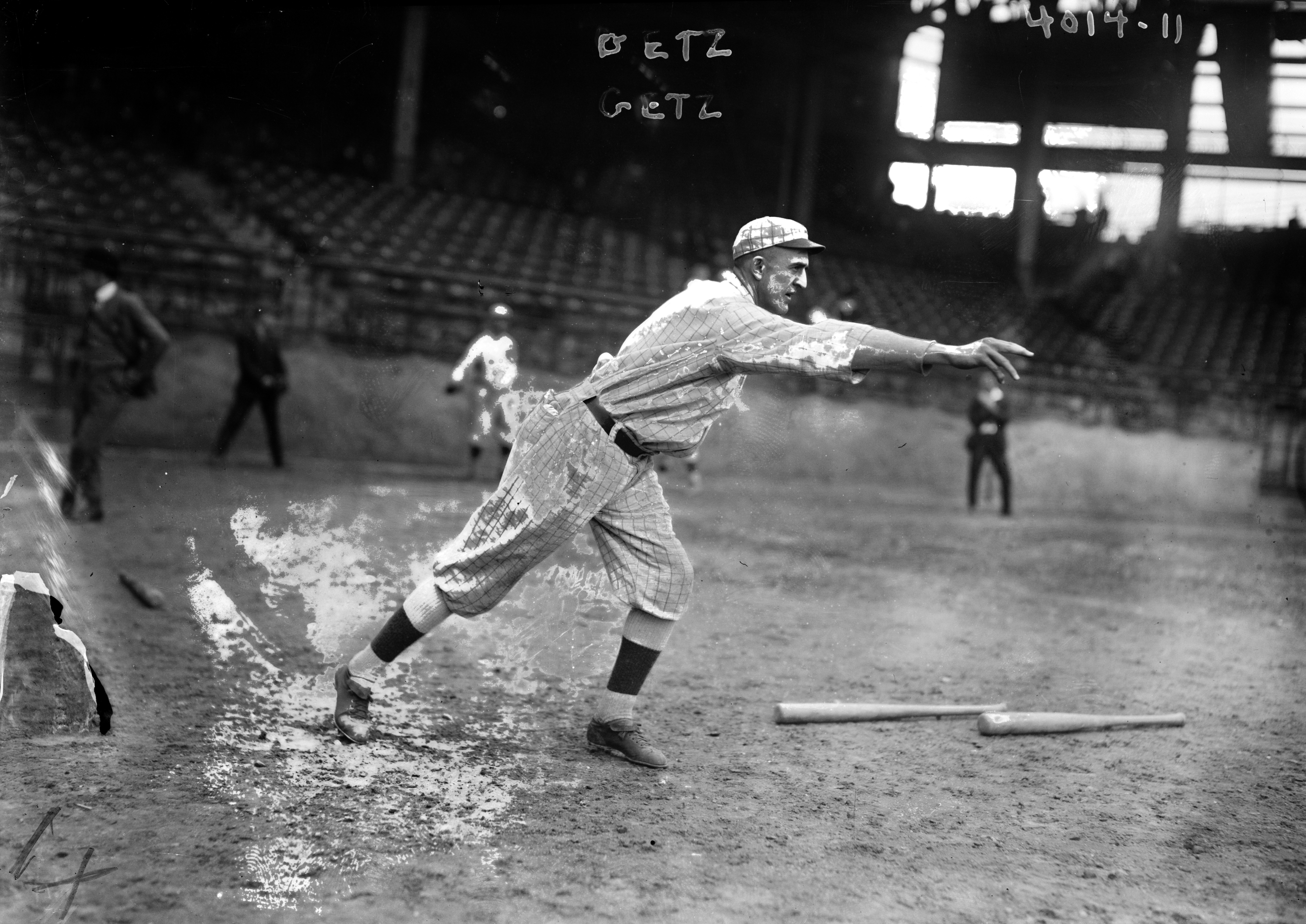
- Third baseman
- Born: August 3, 1889; Pittsburgh, Pennsylvania, U.S.
- Died: May 28, 1969 (aged 79); Red Bank, New Jersey, U.S.
- Batted: Right Threw: Right

MLB debut
- August 15, 1909, for the Boston Doves

Last MLB appearance
- July 10, 1918, for the Pittsburgh Pirates

MLB statistics
- Batting average: .238
- Home runs: 2
- Runs batted in: 93
- Stats at Baseball Reference

Teams
- Boston Doves (1909–1910); Brooklyn Robins (1914–1916); Cincinnati Reds (1917); Cleveland Indians (1918); Pittsburgh Pirates (1918)

Gustave Getz (August 3, 1889 – May 28, 1969) was an American professional baseball third baseman. He played in Major League Baseball (MLB) from 1909 through 1918 for the Boston Doves, Brooklyn Robins, Cincinnati Reds, Cleveland Indians, and Pittsburgh Pirates. He had one at-bat in the 1916 World Series for Brooklyn.
