= Bill Cooney =

American baseball player (1883–1928)

- Third baseman / Shortstop / Relief pitcher
- Born: April 7, 1883; Boston, Massachusetts, U.S.
- Died: November 6, 1928 (aged 45); Roxbury, Massachusetts, U.S.
- Batted: Unknown Threw: Right

MLB debut
- September 22, 1909, for the Boston Doves

Last MLB appearance
- May 2, 1910, for the Boston Doves

MLB statistics
- Batting average: .273
- Home runs: 0
- Runs batted in: 1
- Win–loss record: 0–0
- Strikeouts: 3
- Earned run average: 1.42
- Stats at Baseball Reference

Teams
- Boston Doves (1909–1910)

William Ambrose "Cush" Cooney (April 7, 1883 – November 6, 1928) was an American former Major League Baseball player. He played two seasons with the Boston Doves from 1909 to 1910.

Cooney made his Major League Baseball debut on September 22, 1909, against the Pittsburgh Pirates, relieving Lew Richie in the 6^{th} inning with the Doves down 12–7. Cooney threw for four scoreless innings, giving up three hits and one base on balls.
