= Chick Evans (baseball) =

American baseball player (1889–1916)

- Pitcher
- Born: October 15, 1889; Arlington, Vermont
- Died: September 2, 1916 (aged 26); Schenectady, New York
- Batted: Right Threw: Right

MLB debut
- September 19, 1909, for the Boston Doves

Last MLB appearance
- August 27, 1910, for the Boston Doves

MLB statistics
- Win–loss record: 1–4
- Strikeouts: 23
- Earned run average: 4.96
- Stats at Baseball Reference

Teams
- Boston Doves (1909–1910)

Charles Franklin Evans (October 15, 1889 – September 2, 1916) was a Major League Baseball pitcher. He played two seasons with the Boston Doves from 1909 to 1910. Evans died of heart failure on September 2, 1916.
