= Forrest More =

American baseball player (1881–1968)

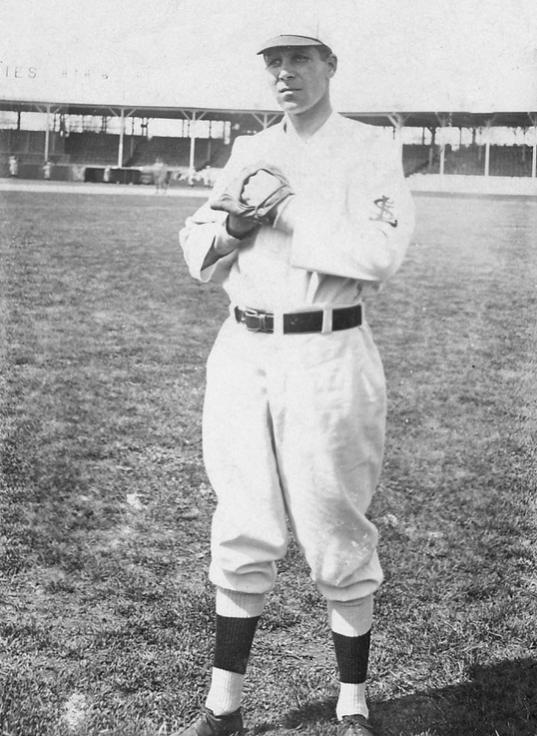
- Pitcher
- Born: September 30, 1881; Hayden, Indiana, U.S.
- Died: August 17, 1968 (aged 86); Columbus, Indiana, U.S.
- Batted: Right Threw: Right

MLB debut
- April 15, 1909, for the St. Louis Cardinals

Last MLB appearance
- September 8, 1909, for the Boston Doves

MLB statistics
- Win–loss record: 2–10
- Strikeouts: 27
- Earned run average: 4.74
- Stats at Baseball Reference

Teams
- St. Louis Cardinals (1909); Boston Doves (1909)

Forrest Thedore More (September 30, 1881 – August 17, 1968) was an American professional baseball player who pitched one season in Major League Baseball. In 1909, he split his lone major league season in the National League with the St. Louis Cardinals and the Boston Doves.

== Career ==
Born in Hayden, Indiana, More began his professional baseball career with the Springfield Senators of the Illinois–Indiana–Iowa League in 1906 at the age of 24. He played with the Senators through the 1908 season.

He signed with the St. Louis Cardinals of the National League (NL) before the 1909 season. In his short stint with the team, he pitched in 15 games, mostly in relief, and a 1–5 Win–loss record along with a 5.04 earned run average (ERA) before being placed on waivers. On July 1, 1909, the Boston Doves claimed the waivers. More pitched in an additional ten games for the Doves, compiling a record of 1–5 and a 4.44 ERA. On April 5, 1910, More was sold by the Doves to the Chattanooga Lookouts of the Southern Association. He played with the Lookouts until the 1913 season, when he was sold to the Nashville Vols, also of the Southern Association. He remained with the Vols through the end of the 1914 season, and retired from professional baseball.

== Post-career ==
More died at the age of 86 in Columbus, Indiana, and is interred at Hillcrest Cemetery in North Vernon, Indiana.
