= Harley Young =

American baseball player (1883–1975)

- Pitcher
- Born: September 28, 1883; Portland, Indiana, U.S.
- Died: March 26, 1975 (aged 91); Jacksonville, Florida, U.S.
- Batted: Right Threw: Right

MLB debut
- April 21, 1908, for the Pittsburgh Pirates

Last MLB appearance
- July 4, 1908, for the Boston Doves

MLB statistics
- Win–loss record: 0–3
- Earned run average: 2.62
- Strikeouts: 29
- Stats at Baseball Reference

Teams
- Pittsburgh Pirates (1908); Boston Doves (1908)

Harlan Edward Young (September 28, 1883 – March 26, 1975), nicknamed "Cy the Third", was an American professional baseball pitcher. He played for two Major League Baseball teams in 1908, eight games for the Pittsburgh Pirates and six games for the Boston Doves.
