= Beals Becker =

American baseball player (1886–1943)

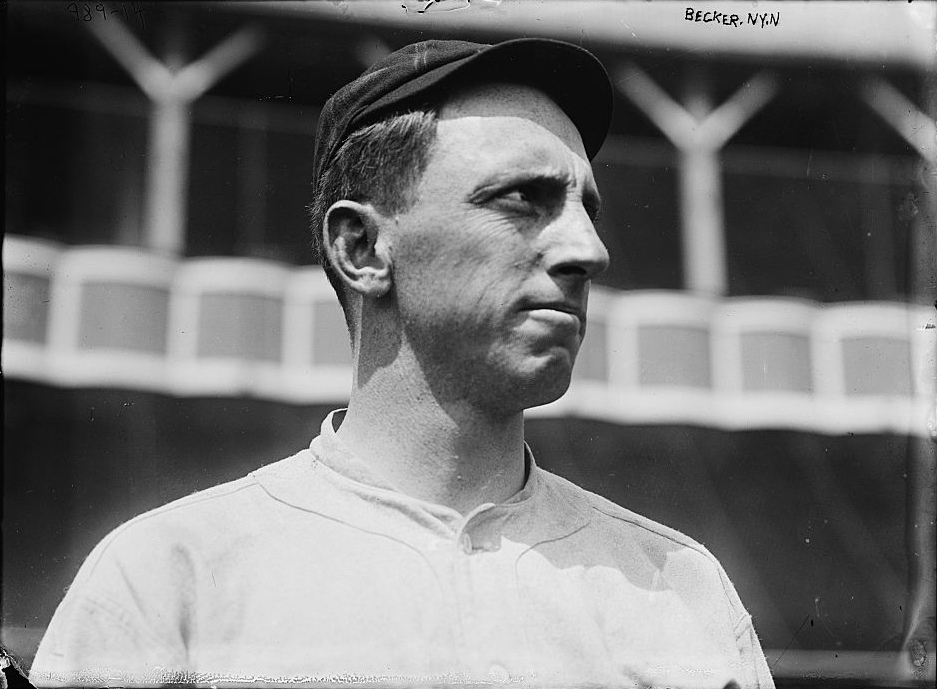
- Becker with the New York Giants
- Outfielder
- Born: July 5, 1886; El Dorado, Kansas, U.S.
- Died: August 16, 1943 (aged 57); Huntington Park, California, U.S.
- Batted: Left Threw: Left

MLB debut
- April 19, 1908, for the Pittsburgh Pirates

Last MLB appearance
- October 6, 1915, for the Philadelphia Phillies

MLB statistics
- Batting average: .276
- Home runs: 45
- Runs batted in: 296
- Stats at Baseball Reference

Teams
- Pittsburgh Pirates (1908); Boston Doves (1908–1909); New York Giants (1910–1912); Cincinnati Reds (1913); Philadelphia Phillies (1913–1915)

David Beals Becker (July 5, 1886 – August 16, 1943) was an American outfielder in Major League Baseball from 1908 to 1915.

== Biography ==
Becker was born in El Dorado, Kansas in 1886. He attended Wentworth Military Academy in Lexington, Missouri and is the only Wentworth graduate ever to play major league baseball. At Wentworth, Becker was a Lieutenant in Company A and was a member of the Bugle Corps. He played left end for the football team, was center on the basketball team, and pitched and played the outfield on the baseball nine. Becker was the recipient of Wentworth's Champion Athlete Award in 1903, his last year.

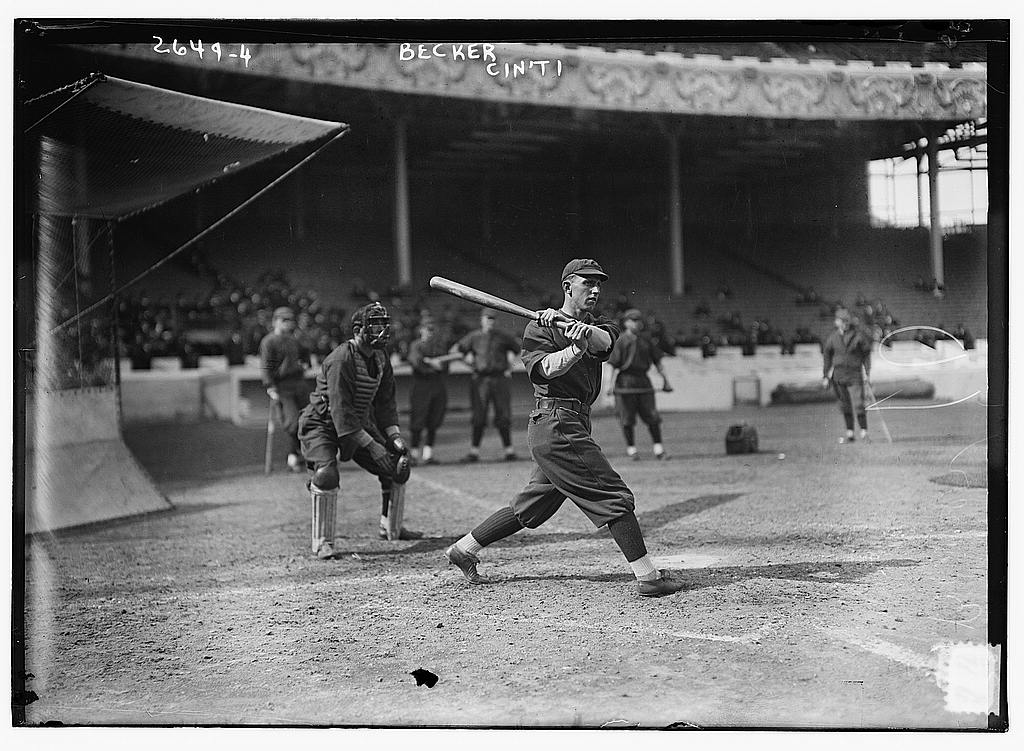
Becker batting for the Cincinnati Reds in 1913, at the Polo Grounds in New York

From 1908 to 1915, Becker played for the Pittsburgh Pirates, the Boston Doves, the New York Giants, the Cincinnati Reds, and the Philadelphia Phillies. Often upset by hometown heckling, Becker usually played better on the road. He was a fair fielder and, as a left-handed batter who had trouble with southpaw pitching, he was often platooned to face right-handers. Becker made a name for himself in the major leagues as a hard-hitting outfielder, who four times placed in the top ten in home runs in the National League during the "deadball era." In 1909, he was second in the league with 6 homers; in 1913, he was sixth with 9 homers; in 1914, he was fifth with 9 homers; and in his final season, 1915, Becker was fourth with a career-high 11 homers. In 1910, Becker became the first player to hit two pinch-hit home runs in one season. On June 9, 1913, he tied a 20th-century major league record with two inside-the-park home runs in one game. His best all-around year was 1914, when he hit .325, second in the league, with 9 home runs and 66 runs batted in for the Phillies. He played in three World Series, two with the Giants in 1911 and 1912, and one with the Phillies in 1915.

In 876 games over eight seasons, Becker posted a .276 batting average (763-for-2764) with 368 runs, 114 doubles, 43 triples, 45 home runs, 296 runs batted in, 129 stolen bases, 241 bases on balls, .335 on-base percentage and .397 slugging percentage. He finished his career with a .954 fielding percentage playing at all three outfield positions.

After his major league career ended, Becker bounced around the minor leagues for a number of years and was a member of the minor league champion Kansas City Blues in 1923. He died in Huntington Park, California in 1943 at the age of 57.

On episode #1309, (airing March 23, 2009) of PBS's Antiques Roadshow, a man who claimed to be Becker's great-great nephew brought two photographs and a uniform belonging to Becker to the show for appraisal. The items were valued at US$50,000.
