= Fred Stem =

American baseball player (1885-1964)

- First baseman
- Born: September 22, 1885; Oxford, North Carolina, U.S.
- Died: September 5, 1964 (aged 78); Darlington, South Carolina, U.S.
- Batted: Left Threw: Right

MLB debut
- September 15, 1908, for the Boston Doves

Last MLB appearance
- August 15, 1909, for the Boston Doves

MLB statistics
- Batting average: .224
- Home runs: 0
- Runs batted in: 14
- Stats at Baseball Reference

Teams
- Boston Doves (1908–09)

Frederick Boothe Stem (September 22, 1885 – September 5, 1964) is an American former Major League Baseball first baseman. He played for the Boston Doves from 1908 to 1909. He attended college at the University of North Carolina.
