= Tom Tuckey =

American baseball player

- Pitcher
- Born: October 7, 1884; Union City, Connecticut, U.S.
- Died: October 17, 1950 (aged 66); New York City, New York, U.S.
- Batted: Unknown Threw: Left

MLB debut
- August 11, 1908, for the Boston Doves

Last MLB appearance
- August 9, 1909, for the Boston Doves

MLB statistics
- Win–loss record: 3–12
- Earned run average: 3.49
- Strikeouts: 42
- Stats at Baseball Reference

Teams
- Boston Doves (1908–1909)

Thomas Henry Tuckey (October 7, 1884 – October 17, 1950), nicknamed "Tabasco Tom", was an American Major League Baseball pitcher who played for the Boston Doves in 1908 and 1909.
