= Al Mattern =

American baseball player (1883-1958)

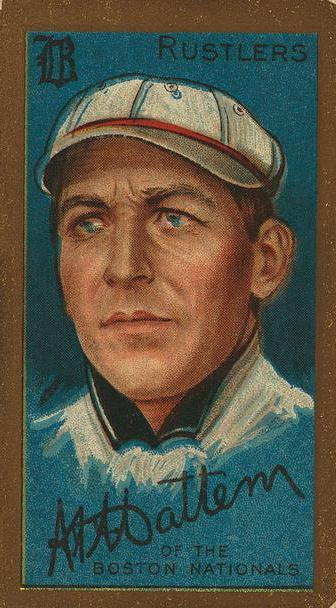
- Pitcher
- Born: June 16, 1883; West Rush, New York, U.S.
- Died: November 6, 1958 (aged 75); West Rush, New York, U.S.
- Batted: Left Threw: Left

MLB debut
- September 16, 1908, for the Boston Doves

Last MLB appearance
- April 19, 1912, for the Boston Braves

MLB statistics
- Win–loss record: 36–58
- Earned run average: 3.37
- Strikeouts: 254
- Stats at Baseball Reference

Teams
- Boston Doves/Rustlers/Braves (1908–1912)

Alonzo Albert Mattern (June 16, 1883 – November 6, 1958) was an American professional baseball player who pitched in the Major Leagues from 1908 to 1912. He played for the Boston Braves.
