= Charlie Starr =

American baseball player (1878–1937)

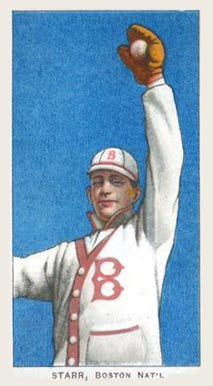
- Second baseman
- Born: August 30, 1878; Pike County, Ohio, U.S.
- Died: October 18, 1937 (aged 59); Pasadena, California, U.S.
- Batted: Unknown Threw: Right

MLB debut
- April 29, 1905, for the St. Louis Browns

Last MLB appearance
- August 1919, 1909, for the Philadelphia Phillies

MLB statistics
- Batting average: .211
- Home runs: 0
- Runs scored: 20
- Stats at Baseball Reference

Teams
- St. Louis Browns (1905); Pittsburgh Pirates (1908); Boston Doves (1909); Philadelphia Phillies (1909)

Charles Watkin Starr (August 30, 1878 – October 18, 1937) was an American Major League Baseball infielder. He played parts of three seasons in the majors, mostly as a second baseman, for the St. Louis Browns, Pittsburgh Pirates, Boston Doves and Philadelphia Phillies.

== Sources ==
- Career statistics from Baseball Reference · Baseball Reference (Minors) · Retrosheet · Baseball Almanac
