= Cecil Ferguson =

American baseball player (1883–1943)

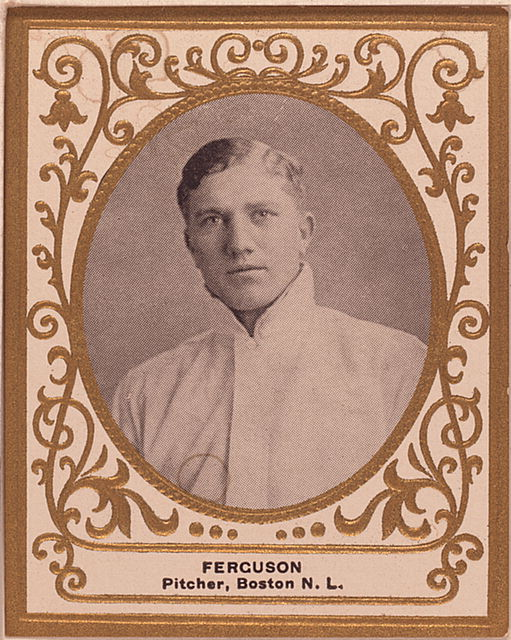
- Pitcher
- Born: August 19, 1883; Ellsworth, Indiana, U.S.
- Died: September 5, 1943 (aged 60); Montverde, Florida, U.S.
- Batted: Right Threw: Right

MLB debut
- April 19, 1906, for the New York Giants

Last MLB appearance
- July 21, 1911, for the Boston Rustlers

MLB statistics
- Win–loss record: 29–46
- Earned run average: 3.34
- Strikeouts: 298
- Stats at Baseball Reference

Teams
- New York Giants (1906–1907); Boston Doves/Rustlers (1908–1911)

Cecil B. Ferguson (August 27, 1883 – September 5, 1943) was an American professional baseball player.

He was a right-handed pitcher over parts of six seasons (1906–1911) with the New York Giants and Boston Doves/Rustlers. During his career, he compiled a 29–46 record in 142 appearances, with a 3.34 earned run average and 298 strikeouts.

After his baseball career, Ferguson became an osteopathic doctor, and gave medical treatment to many Major League baseball players. He graduated with a Doctor of Osteopathic Medicine (D.O.) from the Kirksville College of Osteopathic Medicine. Ferguson was also the coach of the baseball team at the American School of Osteopathy.

Ferguson died in Montverde, Florida, aged 60.

== See also ==
- List of Major League Baseball annual saves leaders
