= Frank Bowerman =

American baseball player and manager (1868–1948)

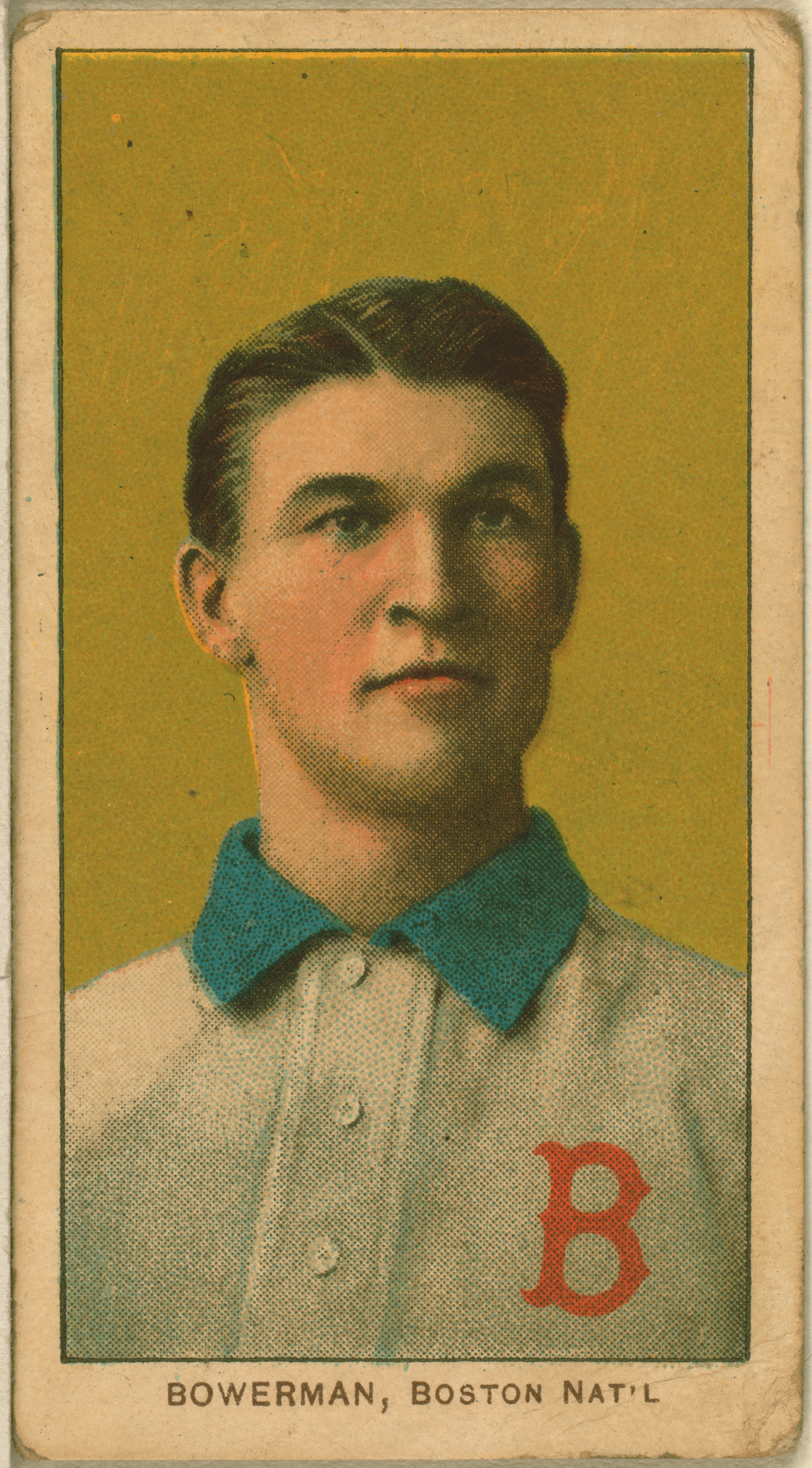
- Frank Bowerman baseball card
- Catcher / Manager
- Born: December 5, 1868; Romeo, Michigan, U.S.
- Died: November 30, 1948 (aged 79); Romeo, Michigan, U.S.
- Batted: Right Threw: Right

MLB debut
- August 24, 1895, for the Baltimore Orioles

Last MLB appearance
- July 13, 1909, for the Boston Doves

MLB statistics
- Batting average: .250
- Home runs: 13
- Runs batted in: 393
- Managerial record: 22–54
- Winning %: .289
- Stats at Baseball Reference

Teams
- As player: Baltimore Orioles (1895–1898); Pittsburgh Pirates (1898–1899); New York Giants (1900–1907); Boston Doves (1907–1909); As manager: Boston Doves (1909)

Frank Eugene Bowerman (December 5, 1868 – November 30, 1948) was an American catcher and manager in Major League Baseball with the Baltimore Orioles, the Pittsburgh Pirates, the New York Giants, and the Boston Doves, as well as a player-manager for the Doves in his last season in professional baseball. While always playing in the shadows of Wilbert Robinson and Roger Bresnahan, he was a solid player who could play any position in the diamond, and he even pitched an inning for the Giants in 1904. He was also the first to catch Hall-of-Famer Christy Mathewson.

Bowerman was known for having a short fuse, as he repeatedly got into fights with players, umpires, and fans. In one such case in 1903, he punched a heckler in the face and was arrested. He also started a fight with manager Fred Clarke while with the Pirates and gave him a black eye.

The Doves hired him as manager during the 1909 season, but his fiery temper did not go well with his team, and he was relegated to player-only status after only 76 games.

In 1037 games over 15 seasons, Bowerman posted a .250 batting average (853-for-3410) with 345 runs, 13 home runs, 393 RBI and 81 stolen bases. He finished his career with a .965 fielding percentage.

Bowerman died in his birthplace of Romeo, Michigan on November 30, 1948, at the age of 79.

== See also ==
- List of Major League Baseball player–managers
