= List of Atlanta Braves owners and executives =

== Owners ==
Name	Years
Ivers Whitney Adams, John Conkey, Henry L. Pierce, Eben Dyer Jordan, John F. Mills, Harrison Garnder, James A. Freeland, Edward A. White, Frank G. Webster, and others	1871–1887
Arthur Soden, James B. Billings, and William H. Conant	1887–November 28, 1906
George & John Dovey	November 28, 1906–June 19, 1909
John Dovey	June 19, 1909 – November 15, 1910
John P. Harris	November 15, 1910 – December 17, 1910
William Hepburn Russell & Louis Coues Page	December 17, 1910 – November 21, 1911
Estate of William Hepburn Russell	November 21, 1911 – December 19, 1911
John Montgomery Ward & James Gaffney	December 19, 1911 – July 31, 1912
James Gaffney	July 31, 1912 – January 8, 1916
Millet, Roe & Hagen (represented by Arthur Chamberlin Wise) & Percy Haughton	January 8, 1916 – January 30, 1919
George W. Grant	January 30, 1919 – February 20, 1923
Emil Fuchs, Christy Mathewson, and James MacDonough	February 20, 1923 – October 7, 1925
Emil Fuchs, Christy Mathewson Jr., and James MacDonough	October 7, 1925 – 1926
Emil Fuchs, Albert H. Powell, & James V. Giblin	1926–May 15, 1927
Emil Fuchs, James V. Giblin, Charles Adams, Bruce Wetmore, and Charles H. Farnsworth	May 15, 1927 – July 31, 1935
Charles Adams, Bruce Wetmore, and Charles H. Farnsworth	July 31, 1935 – December 10, 1935
Bob Quinn, Charles Adams, Bruce Wetmore, and Weston Adams	December 10, 1935–February 1941
Bob Quinn, Max Meyer, Lou Perini, John Quinn, Joseph Conway, C. Joseph Maney, Dan Marr, Frank McCourt, J. W. Powdrell, Guido Rugo, William Wrang, Francis Ouimet, and Casey Stengel	April 20, 1941 – January 21, 1944
Lou Perini, Guido Rugo, and C. Joseph Maney	January 21, 1944 – January 22, 1951
Lou Perini and C. Joseph Maney	1951–1952
Perini Corporation	1952–1962
William Bartholomay, Thomas A. Reynolds, John McHale, John J. Louis Jr., Daniel C. Searle, Delbert W. Coleman, James B. McCahey Jr., and Perini Corporation	November 16, 1962 – January 6, 1976
Ted Turner/Turner Broadcasting	January 6, 1976–October 1996
Time Warner	October 1996–May 16, 2007
Liberty Media	May 16, 2007 – August 3, 2023

== Presidents ==
Name	Years
Ivers Whitney Adams	1871
John Conkey	1872
Charles H. Porter	1873–1874
Nicholas Apollonio	1875–1876
Arthur Soden	1877–1907
George Dovey	1907–1909
John Dovey	1909–1910
William Hepburn Russell	1910–1911
John Montgomery Ward	1911–1912
James E. Gaffney	1912–1916
Percy Haughton	1916–1918
George W. Grant	1919–1923
Christy Mathewson	1923–1925
Emil Fuchs	1925–1935
Bob Quinn	1935–1945
Lou Perini	1945–1957
Joseph Cairnes	1957–1961
John McHale	1961–1967
William Bartholomay	1967–1973
Daniel Donahue	1973–1975
Ted Turner	1976–1986
Stan Kasten	1986–2003
Terry McGuirk	2003–2007
John Schuerholz	2007–2016
Derek Schiller	2016–present

== General Managers ==
- Bob Quinn
- John Quinn
- John McHale
- Paul Richards
- Eddie Robinson
- John Alevizos
- Bill Lucas
- John Mullen
- Bobby Cox
- John Schuerholz
- Frank Wren
- John Hart
- John Coppolella
- Alex Anthopoulos

== Other executives ==
- Hank Aaron
- Jim Fanning
- Bill Lajoie
- Chuck LaMar
- Ricky Mast
- Wid Matthews
- Dayton Moore
- Paul Snyder
- Dean Taylor
- David Wilder
