= Guido Rugo =

American businessman

Guido Lawrence Rugo
- Born: March 1, 1898; Padua, Italy
- Died: November 18, 1984 (aged 86); Boston, United States
- Occupation: Businessman
- Known for: President of Rugo Construction Co. and part owner of the Boston Braves baseball team
- Spouse: Beatrice Veronica McHugh
- Children: 5

Guido Lawrence Rugo (1898–1984) was an American businessman from Boston who was president of a contracting company and a minority owner and vice president of the Boston Braves baseball team.

== Early life ==
Rugo was born in Padua and raised in Dorchester. He graduated from The English High School, where he was an All-scholastic quarterback for the city championship-winning football team as well as a member of the hockey team. At the start of World War I, Rugo joined the Naval Training Unit at Harvard University. The war ended before he went into active service.

== Business career ==
After graduating from high school in 1917, Rugo went into business with his father. In 1929 he began the Rugo Construction Co. with his brothers. The Rugos were involved in many projects in the Boston area, including the construction of schools for the City of Boston and the Roman Catholic Archdiocese of Boston. In 1939, Rugo was elected president of the Associated General Contractors of Massachusetts. During World War II, the company built the Letterkenny Ordnance Depot in Chambersburg, Pennsylvania, in a joint venture with the Perini Corporation.

In 1945, Rugo's brother Joseph left the firm. Upon his departure he demanded an accounting of an investment fund he and his two brothers owned. Rugo refused and in 1948, Joseph sued him. In 1950, Massachusetts Supreme Judicial Court ordered Rugo to pay his brother $140,418 for his share in the fund. In 1952, Rugo's other brother, Leonard, sued him for an accounting of a $1 million slush fund used to make payoffs to public officials in Boston, Chicopee, Massachusetts, and other communities in connection with building contracts. Rugo testified to making payoffs between 1929 and 1943, but refused to name who received them. Boston City Auditor Charles J. Fox cleared Rugo of wrongdoing and ordered that the Boston School Committee pay Rugo the balance owed on the construction of a school.

== Boston Braves ==
In 1941, Rugo was a member of a syndicate led by Bob Quinn that purchased controlling interest in the Boston Braves (then known as the Bees) from Charles Adams. Rugo was a close friend of Quinn's son, John Quinn. In the fall of 1943, Rugo and two other minority partners, Louis Perini and C. Joseph Maney, issued an ultimatum to the other members of the syndicate - to buy out the trio's stock for what they paid for it or allow the three to purchase the other partners' stock for what they paid for it. The other stockholders elected to sell and on January 21, 1944, Perini, Maney, and Rugo purchased the club outright. The three businessmen, who were all contractors, were known as the "Three Little Steam Shovels". In 1948, the Braves won the National League pennant, but lost the World Series to the Cleveland Indians. In 1951, Rugo sold his interest in the club to Perini and Maney.

== Personal life ==
A resident of Milton, Massachusetts, Rugo moved to Marblehead, Massachusetts, in 1949 after he purchased "Carcassonne", the home of Lydia Pinkham Gove (granddaughter of Lydia Pinkham), for $50,000. In 1964 Rugo sold "Carcassonne" to attorney Robert DiGiacomo and returned to Boston.

On January 30, 1960, Rugo collapsed at a meeting of the Clover Club in Boston, where he was a guest of former Braves publicity director Billy Sullivan. Rugo had suffered a similar episode ten days earlier at his office.

== Death ==
Rugo died on November 18, 1984, at his home in West Roxbury. He was survived by his wife, Beatrice and four of his five sons.
