= Dick Donahue =

American lawyer, political staffer, business executive (1927–2015)

Richard King Donahue

Chairman of the Massachusetts Board of Bar Overseers
- In office September 1977 – ??
- Preceded by: Robert Meserve

Member of the Massachusetts Board of Bar Overseers
- In office 1974–??

Staff Assistant to the President of the United States
- In office January 1961 – November 1963
- President: John F. Kennedy

Personal details
- Born: July 20, 1927 Lowell, Massachusetts
- Died: September 15, 2015 (aged 88) Lowell, Massachusetts
- Resting place: St. Mary's Cemetery (Tewksbury, Massachusetts)
- Party: Democratic Party
- Spouse: Nancy Lawson
- Children: 11 (including Nancy and Joseph)
- Parents: Joseph P. Donahue (father); Dorothy F. Riordan (mother)
- Relatives: Daniel Donahue (brother)
- Education: Dartmouth College (bachelor's degree); Boston University School of Law (LL.B.)

Military service
- Allegiance: United States
- Branch/service: Navy

Richard King Donahue (July 20, 1927 – December 14, 2015) was an American lawyer, political staffer, and business executive. Doanhue also worked as a political confidant and staffer to President John F. Kennedy and to his brothers, Senator Robert F. Kennedy and Ted Kennedy. From 1977 through 2008, he worked as a member of the corporate leadership board of Nike, Inc. He also was well-involved in a number of non-profits.

A member of President Kennedy's inner circle, which was sometimes dubbed the "Irish Mafia", Donahue worked on Kennedy's United States Senate and presidential campaigns and served in Kennedy's White House as the staff assistant to the president of the United States. He subsequently worked on the 1968 presidential campaign of the late President Kennedy's younger brother Robert F. Kennedy, until Robert F. Kennedy was assassinated on the campaign trail. Donahue later worked with Kennedy's surviving brother, United States Senator Ted Kennedy, including on Ted Kennedy's own presidential campaign in 1980. He was also involved in the leadership of the John F. Kennedy Presidential Library and Museum.

During his time on board of Nike, Inc., Donahue's problem-solving and political connections were valuable to the company. Donahue served a four-year stint as the company's president and COO from 1990 through 1994. During this time, he saw the company through great expansion, and he has been credited with helping it double its annual sales totals during his four years in these positions. Nike, Inc. would become a Fortune 500 company in 1995, just one year after he stepped down as president and COO.

Donahue's legal career was very successful. He served in leadership positions in the Massachusetts Bar Association, the American Bar Association, and the New England Bar Association. However, in the late-1990s, he saw his legal reputation take a hit after he was involved in a scheme to use deceptive circumstances to coax a law clerk into saying that Massachusetts District Court Judge Maria Lopez had been entirely biased when she ruled against members of the Demoulas family that were his clients. This ultimately resulted in Donahue being handed a three-year suspension from practicing law in Massachusetts in 2006. He was reinstated to good standing in 2011.

== Early life, education, and military career ==
Donahue was born on July 20, 1927, to Joseph P. Donahue (a lawyer) and Dorothy F. Donahue (née Riordan) in Lowell, Massachusetts. Donahue would remain a resident of Lowell for much of his life. Donahue was the third-born of seven children in his family. His siblings included brothers Daniel and Joseph P. Jr. and sister Margaret.

Donahue served in the United States Navy, being discharged in 1946.

In 1951, he graduated from Dartmouth College with a bachelor's degree. In 1951, he graduated from Boston University Law School with a bachelor of laws degree. In 1953, he married Nancy Lawson, who he had met while attending law school. They would be married for 61 years, until Donahue's death. Together they would ultimately have eleven children. A number of his children established notability of their own, with Donahue's Lowell Sun obituary referring to him as the, "patriarch of a well-known and established Lowell family". Among their children were poet Joseph Donahue and actress and model Nancy Donahue. One of Donahue's sons was born with Down syndrome.

== Politics and government ==
=== 1952 John F. Kennedy U.S. Senate campaign ===
As a young attorney, Donahue was active in Democratic Party politics. In 1952, Donahue met Democratic United States Senate candidate John F. Kennedy in Lowell. After being recruited by Kennedy associates Larry O'Brien and Kenneth O'Donnell, Donahue soon after joined Kennedy's team, becoming key in its grassroots organizing efforts. Donahue would become not just a political advisor to Kennedy and his family, but also a friend to the Kennedy family. He later referred to O'Brien and O'Donnell as his "godparents in politics".

In their book, The Road to Camelot, which details Kennedy's later presidential run, Thomas Oliphant and Curtis Wilkie describe Donahue as having at this point been, "an impressive young man," who, "was beginning to attract notice in the [Democratic] party."

=== Massachusetts Democratic Committee ===
Donahue became vice chairman of the Massachusetts Democratic Committee.

=== 1960 John F. Kennedy presidential campaign ===
By the time of his 1960 presidential campaign, Kennedy had formed an inner-circle that would follow him into the White House. Donahue was a member of that inner circle, often dubbed the "Irish Mafia", which also included Charles U. Daly, Larry O'Brien, Kenneth O'Donnell, David Powers, and Ralph A. Dungan.

As with Kennedy's run for the Senate, Donahue played a major role in the grassroots organizing for Kennedy's presidential bid. During the primaries, he worked on the races in West Virginia and others states whose primaries were seen as important to putting Kennedy on the path to securing the nomination at the Democratic National Convention.

Donahue was a Massachusetts delegate to the 1960 Democratic National Convention.

In The Making of the President 1960, a 1961 Theodore White book about the 1960 election, Donahue was described as a "coruscatingly brilliant young lawyer from Lowell, Massachusetts" with a keen skill for making observations.

=== Kennedy White House ===
During the Kennedy presidential transition, Kennedy tasked Donahue with helping him staff his administration. As part of this, Donahue handled the transition team's management communications from Vice President-elect Lyndon B. Johnson's office requesting political appointments.

In the White House, Donahue served as an assistant/special consultant" to President Kennedy, holding the title "staff assistant to the President" tasked with focusing on "Congress relations" (acting as a liaison between the Kennedy White House and the United States Congress) and patronage appointments.

Expecting the birth of his eighth child, Donahue decided to leave the White House for more lucrative prospects in private legal practice, resigning in mid-November 1963. One week after Donahue left the White House, President Kennedy was assassinated.

=== 1968 Robert F. Kennedy presidential campaign ===
Donahue worked on the 1968 presidential campaign of the late President Kennedy's brother, Robert F. Kennedy. Robert F. Kennedy ran for the 1968 Democratic Party nomination, but was assassinated on the campaign trail.

=== Work with Senator Ted Kennedy ===
Donahue also worked with another of the late President Kennedy's brothers, United States Senator Ted Kennedy. Donahue worked on Kennedy's senate campaigns, as well as a key organizer of his 1980 presidential campaign.

In 1977, Senator Kennedy had Donahue chair the Massachusetts Judgeship Selection Committee, which was tasked with helping select the individuals that Kennedy would recommend for appointment to vacant judgeships.

While working on Kennedy's 1980 presidential campaign, he successfully pursued challenged the ballot petition signatures of competitor Jerry Brown for ballot access in the New York primary. Kennedy had been hesitant to allow his campaign to pursue a signature change against Brown, worrying it would generate bad publicity for his campaign.

=== Massachusetts Board of Bar Overseers ===
Upon the creation of the Massachusetts Board of Bar Overseers, Donahue was appointed to the body. In September 1977, the justices of the Massachusetts Supreme Judicial Court appointed Donahue to succeed Robert Meserve in a three-year term as the board's chairman.

== Nike, Inc ==
Donahue was involved in the leadership of Nike, Inc., joining its board of directors in 1977 and serving on it for three decades. Donahue became involved after the president of the then-president Oregon Bar Association had requested Donahue use his federal government political connections to assist the fledging shoe company to resolve a number of matters, including the payment of very high customs fees to the United States Customs Service. Donahue's political connections were valuable to the company, helping them early on to overcome such challenges. Donahue acknowledged that his Kennedy administration was what secured him his place at the company, once remarking that if were not for President Kennedy, "I probably wouldn't be associated with Nike at all". Donahue would receive credit for be a valuable problem-solver that assisted the company in overcoming challenges in its early years and rise to become a major company. In his first decade with Nike, Donahue served as its director, playing an active part in decisions that saw the company make an international expansion and position itself as a major competitor in the athletic footwear market.

It was announced by the company on June 18, 1990, that they had selected Donahue to become its new chief operating officer (COO) and to be the first occupant of its newly created corporate presidency beginning on July 1, 1990. He had been selected for these positions the company's founder, Phil Knight. Donahue held these positions through 1994. The first challenge he faced was a 1990 boycott of Nike led by Jesse Jackson and his PUSH organization, which accused Nike of poor recruitment of minorities for hiring. Phil Knight and Donahue both suggested that this boycott was the underhanded work of competing company Reebok. In an effort to defend Nike against the accusations, Donahue told reporters at a press conference that Nike had. "some Blacks in management", but was unable to name who the highest-ranking Black executive at the company was when pushed on it. Nike would soon after appoint John Thompson Jr., who was a longtime consultant with the company, to become the first Black member of its board of directors.

During his tenure as president and COO, Donahue helped lead an expansion of the company that saw the addition of 3,000 additional employees by early 1994, and saw the company enter the global market. Donahue has been credited with helping Nike, Inc. double its annual sales numbers from $2 billion in 1990 to roughly $4 billion for the fiscal year ending on November 30, 1993. The company's growth was so great, that, in 1995, it would be named a Fortune 500 company for the first time in its history. It was announced in February 1994 that he would be stepping down from his roles as president and COO later that year, and that the company's board of directors had voted to appoint him as the board's vice chairman effective June 1, 1994. He was succeeded as president by Tom Clarke, a management team protege that Donahue had groomed as a prospective leader. Donahue remained the board's vice chairman until 2008, when he retired from the board of directors.

== Legal career ==
In his early legal career after law school, Donahue worked as a trial attorney at a family law firm, establishing a reputation for proficiency in cross-examination. Both Donahue's father and grandfather had also been lawyers.

After leaving the Kennedy White House, Donahue returned to practicing law in September 1963 when he joined Donahue & Donahue, a law firm that had been founded by his grandfather, Daniel J. Donahue. In career as a trial attorney, Donahue was considered to be a prominent and prolific lawyer. He became a partner at the Lowell-based firm.

Donahue was an elected fellow of the American College of Trial Lawyers.

=== Bar association leadership ===
Donahue served as president of the New England Bar Association for two terms. He also served as president of the Massachusetts Bar Association and was a member of the Massachusetts Bar Association Commission on Professionalism, serving as its chairman for a time. Donahue also served on the Board of Governors of the American Bar Association and in leadership roles in the American Bar Association's litigation section.

=== Demoulas family case and suspension from the bar ===
In the late 1990s, Donahue was hired to oversee the ongoing legal strategy and public relations for members of the Demoulas family that had just been handed an unfavorable ruling by Massachusetts District Court Judge Maria Lopez in their legal battle with other members of their family for control of the multibillion-dollar Market Basket chain of supermarkets. However, Donahue saw his own image take a beating after two lawyers that were associates of his masterminded a plot intended to discredit the judge that had ruled unfavorably by staging a fake job interview as a ruse to coax the judge's law clerk to remark that the judge had been entirely biased against Donahue's clients. This ruse ultimately led to, among other things, death threats being directed against the law clerk. Donahue was accused of ignoring ethical red flags that other members of his legal team had attempted to raise.

By August 1997, the Federal Bureau of Investigation was investigating the plot. On September 26, 1997, the chief justice of the Massachusetts Superior Court filed a grievance regarding it with the Office of Bar Counsel (the counsel to the Massachusetts Board of Bar Overseers). On February 1, 2001, the United States Department of Justice closed its investigation into the matter without pursuing indictments.

On January 4, 2002, a counsel to the Massachusetts Board of Bar Overseers (a state body which Donahue was, incidentally, a past chairman of) filed a petition for discipline to be taken against Donahue and his two associates involved in the plot. The board then selected a special hearing officer to the matter. After a twenty-five days worth of hearings (spread over eighteen months), the hearing officer published her report on May 11, 2005, recommending disbarment for all three. All three appealed this recommendation, calling for dismissal of the petition. In early 2006, they presented oral argument of their appeal before the full Massachusetts Board of Bar Overseers. The board voted unanimously to recommend the disbarring of one associate and 9–2 to recommend the disbarring of the other one. However, the board found Donahue to be less culpable than his associates since he had been only involved in the planning the plot, but not in its execution. They instead voted 7–4 to recommend that he be given a three-year suspension (with all four dissenters having preferred a shorter suspension). The following year, he was officially handed a three-year suspension from practicing law. He was reinstated to good standing on March 28, 2011, when he was granted reinstatement with conditions in a judgement entered by Massachusetts Supreme Judicial Court judge Ralph Gants.

== Philanthropy and non-profit work ==
Donahue, along with his wife, was involved in many Lowell-area non-profits, both by providing support and by serving the boards.

From the mid-1970s through 1990, he served on the board of the institution that is now named the University of Massachusetts Lowell, being the board's chair from 1987 through 1990. The Donahues underwrote many programs at the University of Massachusetts Lowell. In 2009, he and his wife donated $500,000 to the university to establish and endowed arts education professorship. In 1984, Donahue became one of the founding board members of the John F. Kennedy Library Foundation, serving as the board's vice president for almost thirty years. Donahue was involved in the 1989 establishment of the John F. Kennedy Profile in Courage Award, also the original chairman of the award committee. Donahue and his wife were involved in the founding of the Merrimack Repertory Theatre in 1987.

Donahue headed the Lowell Plan organization in the 1980s.

== Death ==
At the age of 88, Donahue died on September 15, 2015, at his residence in Lowell, Massachusetts after a period of declining health. On September 24, after a well-attended funeral service at St. Patrick Church, Donahue was buried at St. Mary's Cemetery in Tewksbury, Massachusetts.

== Awards and recognition ==
In 1979, the New England Bar Association awarded Donahue its "Gold Medal". In 2004, Donahue received the "Irishman of the Year" award from Friends of the John F. Kennedy Library.

In 1991, he received an honorary degree from University of Massachusetts Lowell. In 1993, the university named its Donahue Hall building for him.

In September 2018, Middlesex Community College named its arts center after the late Donahue, his wife, and their family, naming it the "Richard and Nancy Donahue Family Academic Arts Center".
