= C. Joseph Maney =

Clement Joseph Maney
- Born: March 2, 1882; Boston, Massachusetts, United States
- Died: January 7, 1954 (aged 71); Brighton, Massachusetts
- Other names: Joe Maney
- Occupation: Businessman
- Known for: President of a general contracting company and a minority owner of the Boston Braves baseball team
- Spouse: Laura L. Maney
- Children: 1

Clement Joseph "Joe" Maney was an American businessman from Boston who was president of a contracting company and a minority owner and treasurer of the Boston Braves baseball team.

== Early life ==
Maney was born in Boston and raised in Burlington, Massachusetts. During his youth, Maney played sandlot baseball and was a fan of the Boston Braves. He worked as a timekeeper for Coleman Brothers during the construction of the subway between Franklin and State Streets. Maney attended and graduated from Boston College.

== Business career ==
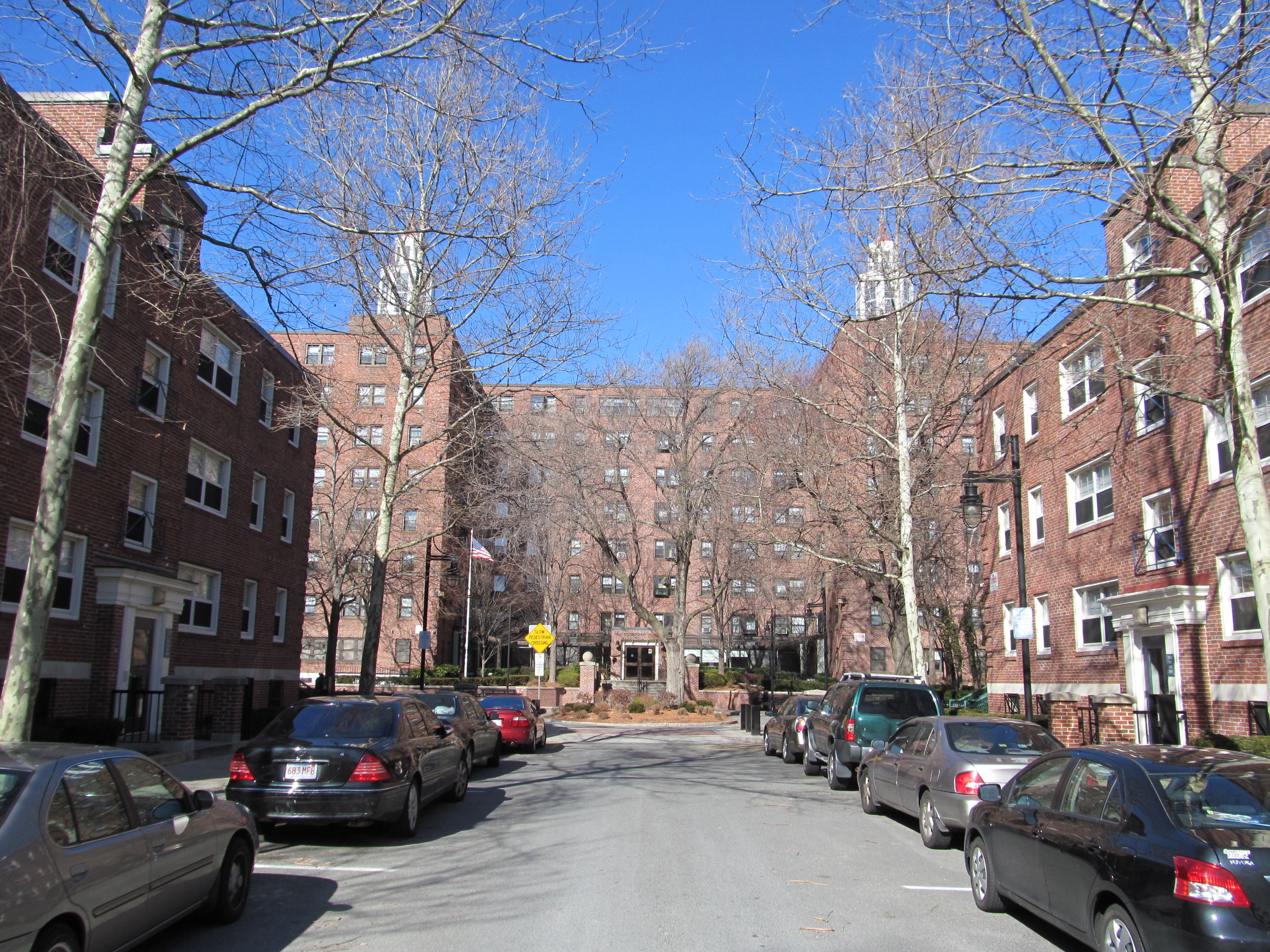
Roosevelt Towers, built by Maney's company

In 1929, Maney opened C. J. Maney Construction Co., Inc. The company's original offices were located at 50 Congress Street in Boston, but later moved to Lexington, Massachusetts.

By 1945, the firm was doing $30 million worth of work on wartime construction projects. Projects Maney's company constructed included Boston College's Fulton Hall, the Boston College Law Library, the Roosevelt Towers housing project in Cambridge, Massachusetts, and the Castle Island Container Terminal.

Outside of construction, Maney served as a director of the Union Savings Bank and was a trustee of the Boston Public Library and the Massachusetts Eye and Ear Infirmary. He also served as president of the New England Road Builders Association and treasurer of the First Franklin Parking Corporation and the First Federal Parking Corporation.

== Boston Braves ==
In 1941, Maney was a member of a syndicate led by Bob Quinn that purchased controlling interest in the Boston Braves (then known as the Bees) from Charles Adams. In May 1943, in an effort to draw in fans by increasing the amount of home runs at Braves Field, Maney had the park's right field fence moved in 20 feet (340 to 320 feet).

In the fall of 1943, Maney and two other minority partners, Louis Perini and Guido Rugo, issued an ultimatum to the other members of the syndicate - to buy out the trio's stock for what they paid for it or allow the three to purchase the other partners' stock for what they paid for it. The other stockholders elected to sell and that January, Perini, Maney, and Rugo purchased the club outright. The three businessmen, who were all contractors, were known as the "Three Little Steam Shovels".

In 1948, the Braves won the National League pennant, but lost the World Series to the Cleveland Indians. In 1951, Rugo sold his interest in the club to Perini and Maney. Maney sold his interest to Perini the following year and the club moved to Milwaukee shortly thereafter.

== Personal life ==
At the time of his death, Maney resided in Chestnut Hill. He was previously a resident of Cambridge. He also had a summer home in Scituate, Massachusetts, where he raised Wire Fox Terriers which won championships in shows across the United States.

Maney was made a Knight of Malta and a Knight of the Holy Sepulchre by Pope Pius XII.

== Death ==
Maney died on January 7, 1954, at the New England Medical Center in Boston following a heart attack. He was 69 years old.
