= John Dovey =

American baseball executive

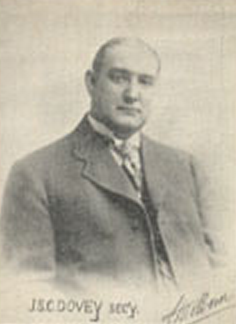
- Dovey pictured on a 1907 baseball postcard
- Born: September 19, 1865
- Died: Unknown
- Occupation: American baseball executive

John S. C. Dovey (September 19, 1865 – ?) was the co-owner of the Boston Doves of the National League with his brother George Dovey from 1907 through 1909, and later sole principal owner for the 1910 season. He was born in Philadelphia in 1865 to John J. and Catharine (née Creswell) Dovey. In 1907, the Dovey brothers purchased the club from Arthur Soden. After becoming principal owner upon the death of his brother in 1909, he sold the franchise to John P. Harris one season later.
