= Carcassonne (disambiguation) =

Carcassonne is a medieval fortified city in France.

Carcassonne may also refer to:

- Cité de Carcassonne, a citadel in the city in France
- Carcassone Montes, a mountain range on Iapetus, the third largest moon of planet Saturn.
- Carcassonne (board game), a board game by Klaus-Jürgen Wrede
  - Carcassonne (video game), a video game adaptation
- Carcassonne Castle, a residence in the United States
- Joseph ben Solomon of Carcassonne, 11th century liturgical poet
- Adolphe Joseph Carcassonne (1826–1891), French poet and dramatist
- David Carcassonne (1789–1861), French physician
- Philippe Carcassonne, French film producer
- Roger Carcassonne (1911–1991), French Resistance member

== See also ==
- Carcassonne Salvaza Airport, an airport in the town of Carcassonne
- Carcassonne Cathedral, a cathedral in Carcassonne, the seat of the Roman Catholic Bishop of Carcassonne
