= Arthur Wise =

Arthur Wise may refer to:

- Hastings Arthur Wise (1954–2005), convicted American mass murderer
- Arthur Chamberlin Wise (1876–1952), co-owner of the Boston Braves baseball team
