= Nancy Donahue =

American fashion model and actress

- Donahue in 2009
- Born: February 16, 1958 (age 68); Lowell, Massachusetts, U.S.
- Education: Lasell Junior College
- Occupations: Model; actress
- Years active: 1978–present
- Parent: Dick Donahue (father)
- Relatives: Joseph Donahue (brother); Daniel Donahue (uncle)
- Modeling information
- Height: 5 ft 9 in (1.75 m)
- Hair color: blonde
- Eye color: green

Nancy Donahue (born February 16, 1958) is an American fashion model and actress.

== Modeling career ==
Donahue got her start in 1978 when her then-boyfriend, who also was a part-time model, suggested she enter a model search contest. She beat out 200 contestants to win a contract with Mademoiselle magazine for ten covers. When photographer Patrick Demarchelier learned that Donahue didn't have an agent, he notified John Casablancas at Elite Model Management, who sent a representative to the studio, and she was quickly signed.

Donahue was one of the top fashion models of the 1980s and worked alongside some of the other top international models of the 1980s, including Kim Alexis, Iman, Kelly Emberg, Carol Alt, Gia Carangi, Janice Dickinson and Paulina Porizkova. Donahue appeared in magazines including American, French, Italian, and British Vogue, as well as Italian Bazaar, Mademoiselle, Self, Redbook, Glamour, The New York Times and More. Donahue was the face for Helena Rubenstein's beauty campaign in the UK and Virginia Slims in the USA.

Donahue often did the Paris collections for American Vogue along with Gia Carangi, Joan Severance and Kelly Le Brock. She also did some runway work in her early career for Calvin Klein, Ralph Lauren, Donna Karan and Perry Ellis in New York and Hong Kong. Donahue also appeared in catalogs for Lord and Taylor, Neiman Marcus and Bloomingdale's. She has worked with numerous photographers, including Demarchelier, Richard Avedon, Steven Meisel, Francesco Scavullo, Irving Penn, Steve Landis, Arthur Elgort and Denis Piel.

=== Star Capital and mismanagement scandal ===
In 1995, Casablancas blamed Donahue for recommending David Weil to her as an experienced money manager. Casablancas claimed that the recommendation from Donahue was so good that he never investigated Weil further, nor did he search into the background of his business partner, Peter Bucchieri.

Weil and Bucchieri operated a firm, Star Capital, within Elite's offices and managed financial portfolios for many of the models. They were subsequently accused of mismanaging the funds. On September 21, 1997, Bucchieri, pleaded guilty to conspiring with Weil to sell fictitious Colorado real estate investments to the models. Bucchieri was sentenced to 33 months in prison. It was subsequently discovered that they had transferred many of the funds to their own bank accounts and used them to pay personal bills and make purchases, including a new Porsche.

Donahue accepted no blame for the incident and claims that she also lost a considerable amount of money to Bucchieri and Weil.

== Filmography ==
- Exposed, dir. James Toback, 1983
- Portfolio, dir. Robert Guralnick, 1986
- The Self-Destruction of Gia (documentary), dir. J.J. Martin, 2002

== Other activities ==
Donahue co-authored One on One, a best-selling book about two people giving to each other physically and emotionally, with her then-husband and fellow model, Jeff Aquilon, published by Simon & Schuster.

Donahue was the pastry chef at Bianco's Catering Company in Chelmsford, Massachusetts for ten years, where she won numerous awards for her pastry at different events.

== Personal life ==
Donahue resides in her hometown of Lowell, Massachusetts, with her third husband, local businessman Steve Joncas. She has a son, George Eng, from her second marriage.
