= George Dovey =

American baseball executive

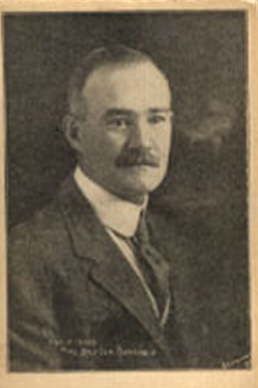
- George Dovey pictured on a 1907 postcard
- Born: April 18, 1862; Pottsville, Pennsylvania, U.S.
- Died: June 19, 1909 (aged 47); Greene County, Ohio, U.S.
- Body discovered: Aboard a Pennsylvania Railroad train, between Cedarville and Xenia in Ohio
- Resting place: Mount Moriah Cemetery, Philadelphia
- Occupation: Team owner of the Boston Doves (1907–1909)
- Employer: St. Louis Car Company (prior to 1907)
- Relatives: John Dovey (brother)

George B. Dovey (April 18, 1862 – June 19, 1909) was the principal owner of the Boston Doves of the National League from 1907 through 1909.

== History ==
Dovey was born in Pottsville, Pennsylvania; he attended college in Kentucky, where he played baseball. For several years he worked as a salesman for the St. Louis Car Company.

In 1907, Dovey bought the Boston Beaneaters from Arthur Soden, becoming the team's principal owner; he then renamed the team the Boston Doves.

At the age of 46, Dovey died of a pulmonary hemorrhage, early in the morning of June 19, 1909 while riding a Pennsylvania Railroad train in Greene County, Ohio, between Cedarville and Xenia. He was buried in Mount Moriah Cemetery, Philadelphia.

Following his death, his brother John became principal owner of the franchise.
