= John Conkey =

American baseball executive

John Adams Conkey (1839–1903) was an American Customs broker and one of the founders of the Boston Red Stockings of the National League. He was team president in 1872.

== Early life ==
Conkey was born in 1839 in Roxbury, Massachusetts to John Quincy Adams Conkey and Martha Bird. Conkey became an orphan in 1850. Dr. Solomon Townsend became his legal guardian and he and his sister were sent to live with Ann Robinson, a widow.

== Business career ==
After graduating from Boston English High School, Conkey learned the Customs House Brokerage from Townsend’s relatives, working for Albert Townsend at A. H. Townsend & Company and for Thomas Townsend at Tuckerman, Townsend & Company. He then worked for Percival Everett before starting Magoun & Conkey with Thatcher Magoun Jr. in 1876. Conkey later became the sole partner in the firm, which became known as John A. Conkey & Co. John A. Conkey & Co. remained in business until it was purchased by Fritz Companies Inc. in September 1991.

== Baseball ==
In 1871, Conkey was part of a group that founded Boston’s National League baseball team. He succeeded Ivers Whitney Adams as club president after the team's first season due to Adams' business conflicts. The club won the National League pennant in 1872, however the team suffered a significant financial loss. The directors decided to remove Conkey and the team treasurer and Conkey was succeeded as team president by Charles Porter. Conkey remained as a director until 1874 when he left to focus on his customs brokerage business.

== Personal life and death ==
On June 11, 1873, Conkey married Ellen V. Read in Lowell, Massachusetts. The couple resided in Newtonville, Massachusetts until Conkey’s death on March 19, 1903.
