= Nicholas Apollonio =

American baseball executive

- Born: April 9, 1843; New York, U.S.
- Died: April 1, 1911 (aged 67); Winchester, Massachusetts, U.S.
- Spouse: Georgiana Pingree (m. 1864)

Nicholas Taylor Apollonio (April 9, 1843 – April 1, 1911) was the president of the Boston Red Stockings/Red Caps of the National League from 1875 through 1876.

In 1874, Apollonio took over the presidency from Charles Porter. He was replaced by Arthur Soden in 1876.
