= American Net and Twine Company Factory =

- U.S. National Register of Historic Places
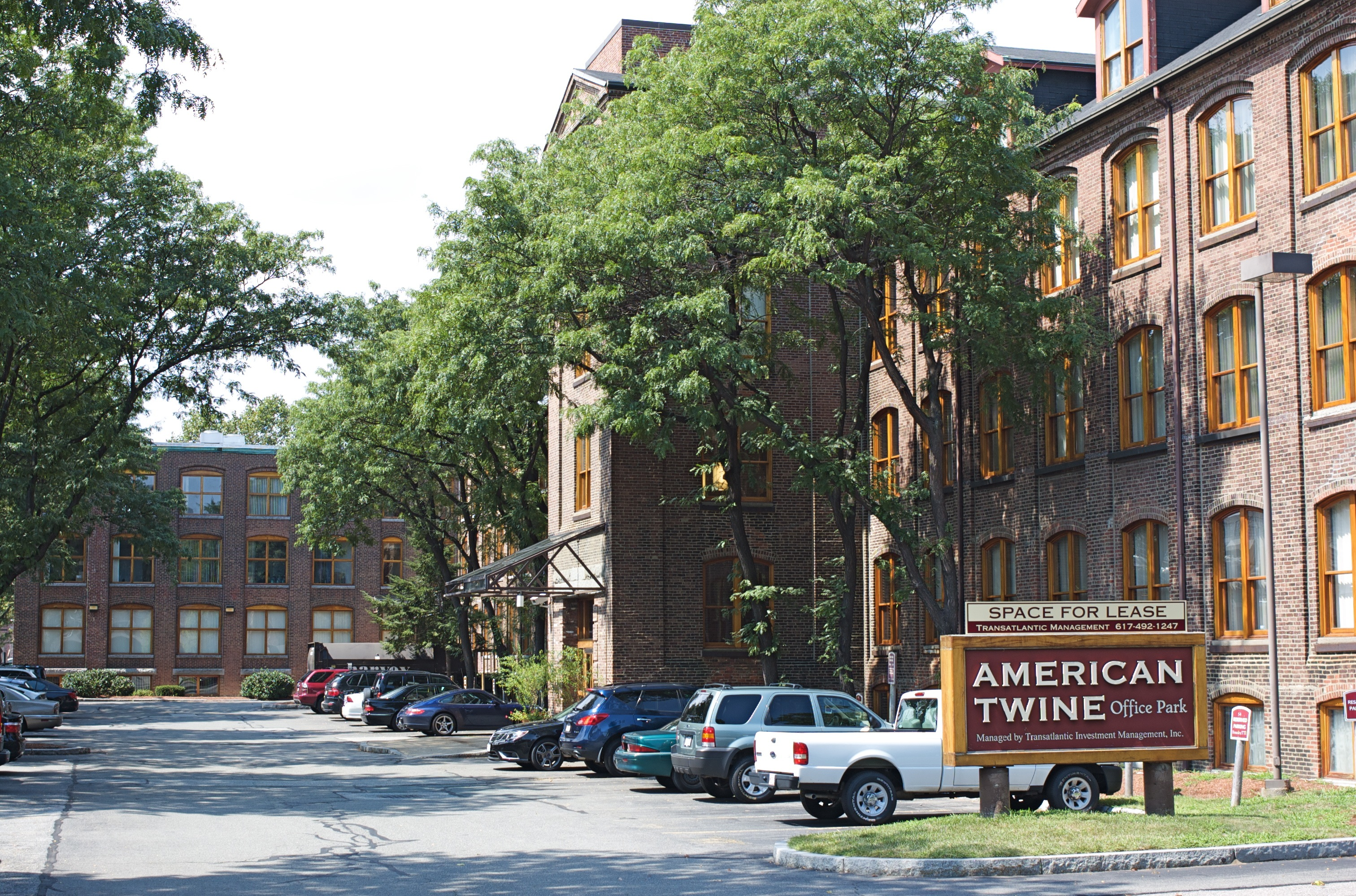

- Location within Massachusetts Location within the United States
- Location: 155 2nd St., Cambridge, Massachusetts
- Coordinates: 42°22′01.5″N 71°04′50.0″W
- Built: 1875
- MPS: Cambridge MRA
- NRHP reference No.: 82001906
- Added to NRHP: April 1, 1982

The American Net and Twine Company Factory is a historic factory at 155 2nd Street in Cambridge, Massachusetts. It was built in 1875 by the nation's first manufacturer of cotton fishing nets. It now houses corporate office space. It was listed on the National Register of Historic Places in 1982.

== Description and history ==
The former American Net and Twine Company Factory stands in a formerly industrial area on the south side of East Cambridge. It is located on the west side of Second Avenue between Charles and Rogers Streets, spanning most of the block between Second and Third Streets. Its parking area is formed out of a truncated part of Bent Street, which continues both east and west of the property. It is an L-shaped three-story brick building, exhibiting industrial Italianate styling. Windows are set in segmented-arch openings, and the truncated gable roof carries a row of gabled dormers. The long leg of the L is oriented east-east (just north of the former alignment of Bent Street), with a projecting four-story stairwell tower near the center of the south elevation. Flat-roof sections to the left, creating the L and interrupting the former Bent Street alignment, are late 19th and early 20th century additions. The sections are stylistically similar to the original portion, also built of brick.

The American Net and Twine Company was founded in 1844, and was the first company in the United States to produce fishing nets made from cotton instead of hemp. Prior to its founding, fish netting was imported from the United Kingdom. Ivers Whitney Adams was president of the company at one point.

This building was built by the company in 1875 to accommodate rising demand for its products, and was twice expanded between 1886 and 1916. It is currently used as offices, including those of One Laptop per Child and Disney Research among other tech firms.

== See also ==
- National Register of Historic Places listings in Cambridge, Massachusetts
