= Emil Fuchs (baseball) =

American baseball executive (1878–1961)

Emil Edwin "Judge" Fuchs
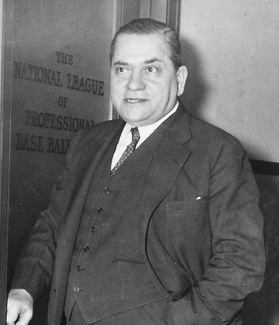
- Fuchs in May 1936
- Born: April 17, 1878; Hamburg, Germany
- Died: December 5, 1961 (aged 83); Boston, Massachusetts, U.S.
- Education: New York University (LLB)
- Occupations: Baseball executive, baseball team owner, lawyer
- Years active: 1899–1935
- Known for: Owner and president of the Boston Braves
- Spouse: Oretta Fuchs
- Children: 3
- Parent(s): Hermann Fuchs; Henrietta Fuchs

Emil Edwin "Judge" Fuchs (April 17, 1878 – December 5, 1961) was a German-born American baseball owner and executive.

== Life ==
Fuchs was born in Hamburg, Germany to Jewish parents, Hermann and Henrietta, but grew up on the Lower East Side of New York. He received his LLB degree from New York University, and began practicing law in 1899. He was married to Oretta, and the couple had two sons (Job and Robert) and one daughter (Helen A. Meltzer). From 1902 to 1910 Fuchs was Deputy Attorney General for New York.

== Career in baseball ==
Fuchs was the attorney for John McGraw's New York Giants when he bought the Boston Braves with Christy Mathewson and James McDonough in 1922. Mathewson was originally intended to be the principal owner. However, Mathewson had never recovered from a severe case of tuberculosis shortly after World War I. He died in 1925, leaving Fuchs as president. After Jack Slattery quit as manager, Fuchs hired Rogers Hornsby to manage the rest of the 1928 season. However, Fuchs was already in financial trouble, and was forced to sell Hornsby to the Chicago Cubs after the season. He then took over as his own manager, finishing in last place.

Fuchs' financial problems came to the attention of his fellow owners as early as 1933. That year, at a meeting to discuss the first Major League Baseball All-Star Game, the National League owners also discussed Fuchs' finances. In hopes of finding a way out, Fuchs borrowed money from minority owner and Boston Bruins founder Charles Adams, pledging his Braves stock as collateral. This effectively gave Adams controlling interest, though Fuchs remained team president. By the end of the 1934 season, a sharp drop in attendance left Fuchs in such dire straits that he could not afford the rent on Braves Field. Fuchs leased the park for $400,0000 per year from the estate of former Braves owner James E. Gaffney, who had built it in 1915. He thought he found a solution in evening greyhound racing, but was forced to drop the idea amid vehement opposition from the other National League owners, league president Ford Frick, and Baseball Commissioner Kenesaw Mountain Landis. While Landis had initially sounded receptive to the idea, he threatened to resign once the proposal went public. However, in January 1945, the Gaffney estate attempted to evict the Braves after Fuchs missed several rent payments and turn Braves Field into a dog racing track for the Boston Kennel Club. With the American League's Boston Red Sox unwilling to share Fenway Park, the Braves were potentially left without a place to play. Ultimately, the National League took over the lease and locked the Kennel Club out.

At the same time, Frick concluded that the Braves likely needed new ownership for 1935. Fuchs needed to make payments to Adams by February 5 to retain the team. Even then, he didn't have enough money to send the Braves to spring training. With the help of Governor James Michael Curley, a close friend, Fuchs mounted a ticket drive that raised $43,400. Combined with $10,000 in cash, this was enough money for him to retain control.

Searching for a long term solution, Fuchs believed he'd found it when he learned that Babe Ruth's days as a New York Yankee were numbered. Fuchs bought the slugger from Jacob Ruppert. The move returned the Babe to the city where he had begun his major league career; he'd played for the Red Sox from 1914 to 1919. Ruth was named vice-president and assistant manager of the Braves, and promised a share of team profits. Fuchs also hinted that Ruth, who made no secret of his managerial ambitions, could become manager as early as 1936. Ruth soon realized that his titles were almost meaningless, and that Fuchs was merely using him in a last-ditch effort to revive his fortunes.

Ruth all but stopped hitting within a month. Realizing he was finished even as a part-time player, he asked Fuchs to let him retire as early as May 12. Seeing a team in disarray, Ruth announced his retirement on June 2. Depending on the source, the final straw came when Fuchs either refused to let him represent baseball at a social function in New York or refused to let him take part in a reception for the maiden voyage of the SS Normandie. What is beyond dispute is that Fuchs released him before the retirement announcement.

Ruth's departure was the beginning of the end for Fuchs. He admitted he did not have the wherewithal to acquire new players or keep the ones he had. Without Ruth as a gate attraction, there was no prospect of him having the money to make his next payment to Adams by August 1. Adams realized this, and demanded that Fuchs either buy out his shares or resign. After last-ditch efforts to find a buyer failed, Fuchs relinquished his shares to Adams on July 31. Adams only kept control until November, when the league took over the team and awarded it to former Red Sox owner Bob Quinn.

== Later life ==
After leaving the Braves, Fuchs resumed his law career. He served as chairman of the Massachusetts Unemployment Compensation Commission from 1935 to 1938. He was a familiar face at Braves games until they moved to Milwaukee in 1952. He died in Boston of a heart attack in 1961.

== Legacy ==
The Boston chapter of the Baseball Writers' Association of America annually awards the Judge Emil Fuchs Memorial Award for Long and Meritorious Service to baseball.
