= Daniel Donahue =

American businessman

Donahue

Daniel J. Donahue (April 23, 1923 – March 20, 2015) was an American businessman who was the owner and president of the Atlanta Braves Major League Baseball club from 1973 until 1975.

Born in Lowell, Massachusetts, Donahue was a graduate of Dartmouth College in Hanover, New Hampshire, and then served with the United States Navy during World War II. Following his service, he received his law degree and was a venture capitalist involved in many aspects of the business world.

In 1976, Donahue sold the franchise to millionaire tycoon Ted Turner.

Donahue died in 2015 in Barrington, Illinois, at the age of 91.

== See also ==
- Atlanta Braves owners and executives
- Dick Donahue (brother)
- Nancy Donahue (niece)
- Joseph Donahue (nephew)
