= Christy Mathewson Jr. =

American athlete and naval officer

- Born: October 19, 1906; New York City
- Died: August 16, 1950 (aged 43); San Antonio, Texas
- Relatives: CPT Christy Mathewson, father
- Military career
- Allegiance: United States of America
- Branch: United States Army
- Service years: 1929–1939, 1941–1946
- Rank: Lieutenant colonel

Christopher "Christy" Mathewson Jr. (1906–1950) was an American pilot and the son of Baseball Hall of Fame pitcher Christy Mathewson.

== Early life ==
Mathewson was born in New York City on October 19, 1906, to Christy and Jane Mathewson. He grew up in New York City, Lewisburg, Pennsylvania, Marlin, Texas, and Los Angeles, California. He graduated from Saranac Lake High School in 1923. He went on to attend his father's alma mater, Bucknell University, where he majored in electrical engineering and played saxophone in the school orchestra. During his junior year at Bucknell, Mathewson Sr. died and Mathewson Jr. was elected to succeed him on the Boston Braves board of directors. Mathewson graduated from Bucknell in 1927.

== Military career ==
In July 1928, Mathewson applied for an appointment as a flying cadet in the United States Army Air Corps. On September 15, 1929, he was one of 124 civilian applicants selected for appointment to the Air Corps. He began his training on October 15, 1929, at Brooks Field in San Antonio, Texas. In 1930, Mathewson graduated from the Army Air Corps Advanced Flying School at Kelly Field. In 1932, Mathewson was assigned to active duty in Hangzhou, where he helped establish the Central Aviation School and served as an aviation advisor to the National Revolutionary Army.

On December 24, 1932, Mathewson married Margaret Phillips of Philadelphia. On January 8, 1933, he and his wife were returning from their honeymoon Shanghai in a Sikorsky amphibious plane that he had borrowed from T. V. Soong. Thirty seconds after takeoff, Mathewson lost control of the plane, which hit the Huangpu River, struck a mudflat, and overturned. The couple was rushed to Huadong Hospital, where Margaret was pronounced dead. Mathewson survived, but suffered serious injuries. In July, Mathewson's left leg was amputated above the knee, and on August 7, he returned to the United States for further medical treatment. On August 12, he went to see specialists at Columbia-Presbyterian Medical Center in New York City, hoping to get help regaining use of his left arm. Mathewson settled in Hagerstown, Maryland and eventually regained use of his arms and learned to walk with an artificial leg. On December 22, 1936, Mathewson married Lee Morton in Coral Gables, Florida.

In 1939, his commission as a first lieutenant on inactive duty in the Air Corps Reserve expired and he was denied reinstatement for physical defects. In March 1941, he was given a job with the Air Corps in Washington D.C. In October 1941, he was assigned to the Western Procurement Division of the Materiel Command to help train cadets from China. He was later moved to Phoenix, Arizona, where he still assisted in training Chinese cadets. In May 1942, he was promoted to the rank of captain on active duty with the Flying Training Command in California. In November 1944, while serving with the Air Transport Command in Europe, Mathewson met Lola Finch of London; two months later, Mathewson divorced his wife to marry Finch. Mathewson retired from the Air Corps in 1946 with the rank of Lieutenant Colonel.

== Later life ==
Following his retirement, Mathewson moved to Dos Huevos Ranch, a half-mile north of Helotes, Texas. On August 15, 1950, a butane explosion occurred while Mathewson was installing an electric dishwasher in his basement. He was able to crawl out of the house and reach a neighbor for assistance. He died the following day at the age of 43.
