= Arthur Chamberlin Wise =

American stock broker (1876–1952)

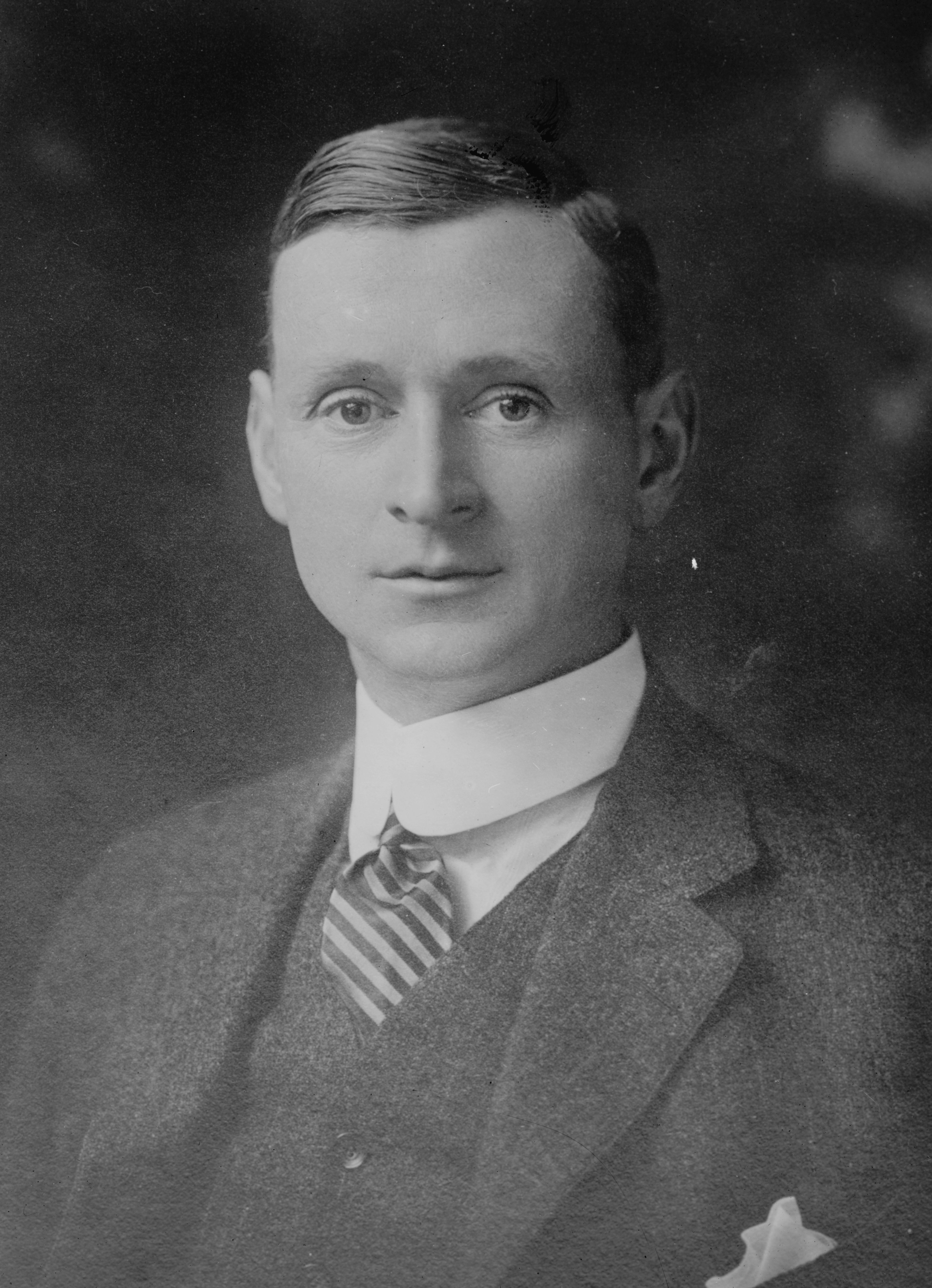
- Born: January 6, 1876; Boston, Massachusetts
- Died: June 26, 1952 (aged 76); Hingham, Massachusetts
- Known for: Owner of the Boston Braves
- Parent(s): Daniel Wise; Mary A. Chamberlin

Arthur Chamberlin Wise (January 6, 1876 - June 26, 1952) was a member of the Boston brokerage firm of Millet, Roe & Hagen and co-owner of the Boston Braves baseball team in 1916 with Percy Duncan Haughton.

== Biography ==
He was born on January 6, 1876, in Boston, Massachusetts, to Daniel Wise and Mary A. Chamberlin of Kennebunkport, Maine. On October 9, 1902, he married Marion Strong Somers in Brookline, Massachusetts. In 1915 he became a member of the Boston Stock Exchange by buying the seat of I. M. Taylor for $15,000.

With Percy Duncan Haughton he bought the Boston Braves baseball team from James E. Gaffney. Wise raised $600,000 to build Fenway Park.

He died on June 26, 1952, in Hingham, Massachusetts. He was buried in Hingham Cemetery in Hingham, Massachusetts.
