= Jack Slattery =

American baseball player, coach, manager (1878–1949)

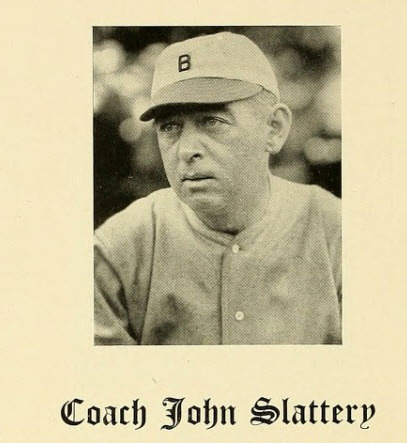
- Catcher / First baseman
- Born: January 6, 1878; South Boston, Massachusetts, U.S.
- Died: July 17, 1949 (aged 71); Boston, Massachusetts, U.S.
- Batted: Right Threw: Right

MLB debut
- September 28, 1901, for the Boston Americans

Last MLB appearance
- September 29, 1909, for the Washington Senators

MLB statistics
- Batting average: .212
- Hits: 61
- Runs batted in: 27
- Stats at Baseball Reference

Teams
- As player: Boston Americans (1901); Cleveland Naps (1903); Chicago White Sox (1903); St. Louis Cardinals (1906); Washington Senators (1909); As manager: Boston Braves (1928)

John Terrence Slattery (January 6, 1878 – July 17, 1949) was an American catcher and first baseman for the Boston Americans, Cleveland Naps, Chicago White Sox, St. Louis Cardinals, and the Washington Senators for parts of four seasons between 1901 and 1909. He was never used regularly, and some of his Major League stops were very short (he played only four games for the Naps). He went to college at Boston College and Fordham University. He was head baseball coach at Harvard from 1920 to 1923 and Boston College from 1924 to 1927. In 1928, he was convinced to lead the Boston Braves for a year, but his stint with the Braves lasted only 31 games, going 11–20. He resigned as manager and owner Emil Fuchs hired Rogers Hornsby to replace him.

Slattery died in Boston, Massachusetts, at age 71.
