= George Washington Grant =

American baseball executive

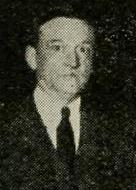
- Born: Cincinnati
- Died: April 5, 1947 (aged 77); Los Angeles
- Spouse: Mae Reed (died July 30, 1937)

George Washington Grant was an American businessman who owned the Boston Braves of the National League from 1919 to 1923.

Grant was born in Cincinnati, where he worked as a paper boy, messenger, and street car conductor. One of his friends growing up was future Chicago Cubs owner Charles Murphy. Grant later owned a racing stable and managed Kid McCoy's saloon. In 1907 he founded George W. Grant & Co. in New York City to sell stock in cobalt mines.

In 1905, Grant opened the Bioscope in Victoria, London. The theater consisted of a hall constructed behind an existing storefront and was one of the city's first purpose-built cinemas. Grant later changed the name of the theatre to the Biograph and in 1908, founded Biograph Theatres Inc. with Harry Grahame Russell. By 1911 there were ten Biograph Theatres in London. In 1915 he sold his interests in England and returned to the United States. He shared an office on Wall Street with New York Giants owner Charles Stoneham and was one of the team's season-ticket holders. On January 30, 1919, he purchased the Boston Braves for a reported $400,000. During his tenure as owner, the club was hampered by injuries and poor weather that cost him almost all of his holiday dates and most of his Saturdays. On February 20, 1923, he sold the club to a syndicate led by Christy Mathewson and Emil Fuchs.

After selling the Braves, Grant moved to Havana, where he served as treasurer of the Oriental Park Racetrack. He retired to Los Angeles, where he died on April 5, 1947, at the age of 77.
