= James E. Gaffney =

American baseball executive (1868–1932)

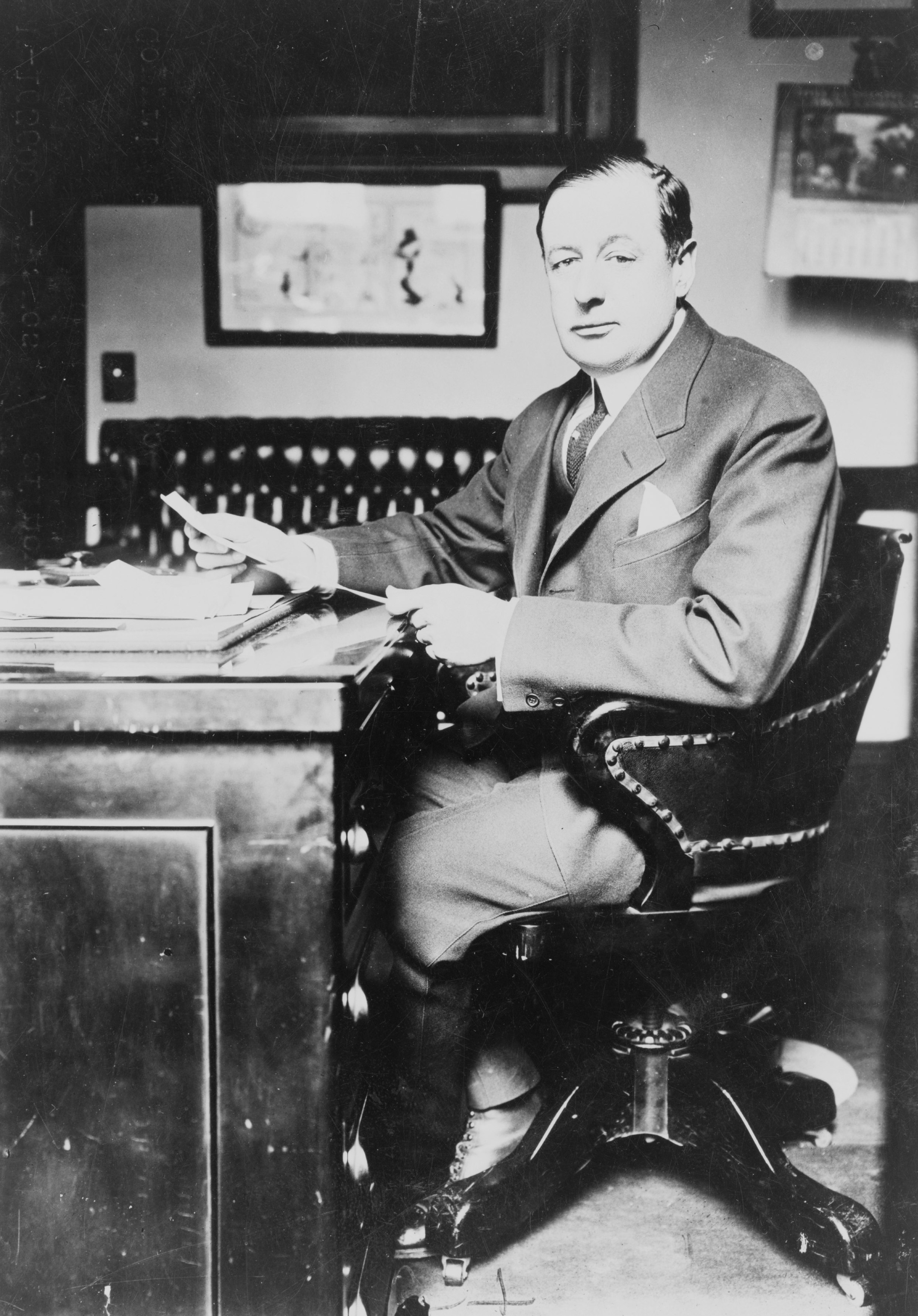
James E. Gaffney, seated at a desk.

James Edward Gaffney (March 7, 1868 – August 17, 1932) was the owner of the Boston Braves of the National League from 1912, when he purchased the club from the estate of William Hepburn Russell, to 1916, when he sold the franchise to Percy Haughton.

Gaffney was born in New York City to Patrick Gaffney and Anne Masterson, Irish immigrants.

In 1890, he married Essie Smith, whose family held numerous valuable properties in Manhattan.

Gaffney was a Tammany Hall alderman and construction company owner. The two were intertwined. Gaffney made his fortune winning contracts that he'd obtained via Tammany and insider dealing. He was one of the closest friends and advisers of Charles Francis Murphy, Tammany's boss. Essie Gaffney was a dear friend of Murphy's wife, Margaret.

The "Miracle Braves" won the 1914 World Series under Gaffney's ownership. As team owner, he built Nickerson Field (originally Braves Field) in Boston, which opened in 1915. Gaffney continued to own the stadium, although he never re-entered baseball after 1916 (despite various rumors). His primary pursuit became horseracing.

== Thoroughbred racing ==
A fan of horse racing, James Gaffney owned and raced a stable of Thoroughbreds for a number of years.
