= Percy Haughton =

American athlete and coach (1876–1924)

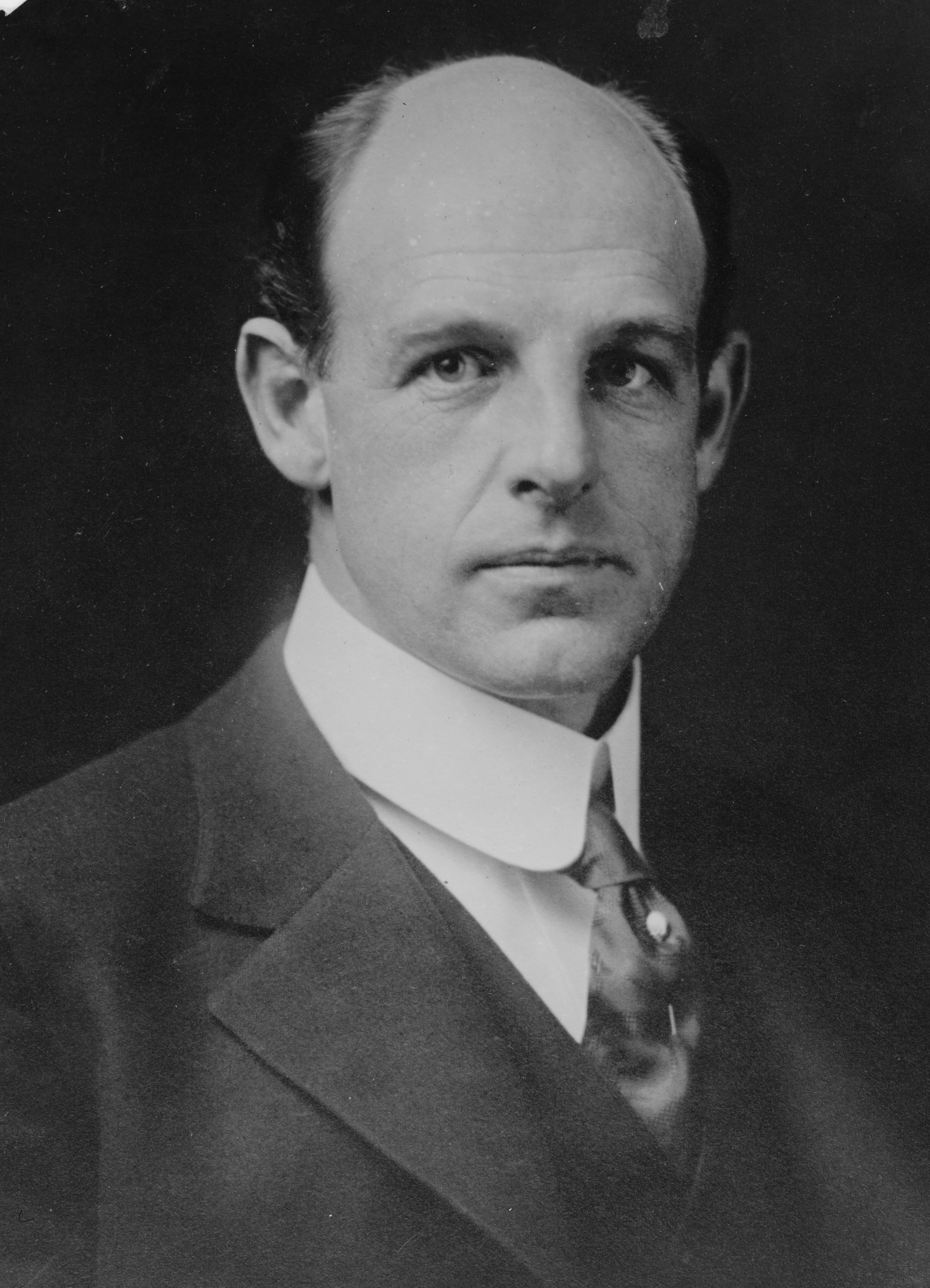

Biographical details
- Born: July 11, 1876; Staten Island, New York, U.S.
- Died: October 27, 1924 (aged 48); New York, New York, U.S.

Playing career

Football
- 1898: Harvard

Baseball
- 1899: Harvard
- Position: Tackle (football)

Coaching career (HC unless noted)

Football
- 1899–1900: Cornell
- 1908–1916: Harvard
- 1917: Camp Devens
- 1923–1924: Columbia

Baseball
- 1915: Harvard

Head coaching record
- Overall: 97–17–6 (football); 23–7 (baseball)

Accomplishments and honors

Championships
- Football; 4 national (1908, 1910, 1912–1913)

Awards
- Second-team All-American (1898)
- College Football Hall of Fame; Inducted in 1951 (profile)

Percy Duncan Haughton (July 11, 1876 – October 27, 1924) was an American football and baseball player and coach. He served as head football coach at Cornell University from 1899 to 1900, at Harvard University from 1908 to 1916, and at Columbia University from 1923 to 1924, compiling a career college football record of 97–17–6. The Harvard Crimson claimed national champions for three of the seasons that Haughton coached: 1910, 1912, and 1913. Haughton was also Harvard's head baseball coach in 1915 and part owner of the Boston Braves from 1916 to 1918. He was inducted into the College Football Hall of Fame as a coach in 1951.

== Biography ==
Haughton was born on July 11, 1876. Haughton attended Groton School, graduating in 1895, and then went on to Harvard College, graduating in 1899.

Haughton and his wife owned Gould Island in Rhode Island where Haughton trained the Harvard football team. Apocryphal tales assert that before the 1908 Harvard–Yale Game, Haughton strangled a bulldog in the locker room to motivate his players.

He bought the Boston Braves with Arthur Chamberlin Wise in 1916. Haughton served as club president until the team was purchased by George Washington Grant in 1919.

Haughton served as the head coach of Camp Devens football team in 1917. In 1918 he was commissioned as a major in the United States Army's Chemical Warfare Service. After Haughton's military service ended, he announced he would not return to Harvard, instead focusing on his work with White Weld & Co.

Haughton became Columbia's football coach in spring 1923 as the school re-established a team that had been dissolved in 1905 following allegations that football had become too violent. To alleviate concerns that the game was still too violent, Haughton promised to instil discipline in his players, saying: "It will be my purpose to teach the men what they should learn in order to better prepare for life after the university. If I can do that, if I can contribute toward qualifying them for the finest type of citizenship, I will be satisfied."

Haughton died at age 48 on October 27, 1924, after becoming ill on the Columbia football field. The cause of death was classified as acute indigestion.

== Head coaching record ==
=== Football ===
Year	Team	Overall	Conference	Standing	Bowl/playoffs
Cornell Big Red (Independent) (1899–1900)
1899	Cornell	7–3			
1900	Cornell	10–2			
Cornell:		17–5			
Harvard Crimson (Independent) (1908–1916)
1908	Harvard	9–0–1			
1909	Harvard	8–1			
1910	Harvard	9–0–1			
1911	Harvard	6–2–1			
1912	Harvard	9–0			
1913	Harvard	9–0			
1914	Harvard	7–0–2			
1915	Harvard	8–1			
1916	Harvard	7–3			
Harvard:		72–7–5			
Columbia Lions (Independent) (1923–1924)
1923	Columbia	4–4–1			
1924	Columbia	4–1 (Note: Paul Withington coached the last four games of the season after Haughton's death on October 27, 1924.)			
Columbia:		8–5–1			
Total:		97–17–6			
National championship Conference title Conference division title or championship game berth
