= Robert Meserve =

Robert W. Meserve
- Born: January 12, 1909; Chelsea, Massachusetts
- Died: September 21, 1995 (aged 86); Boston, Massachusetts
- Occupation: Trial lawyer

Robert William Meserve (January 12, 1909 – September 21, 1995) was an American trial lawyer from Boston, Massachusetts who served as president of the American Bar Association from 1972 to 1973. He also served as president of the American College of Trial Lawyers from 1968 to 1969 and as president of the Boston Bar Association from 1963 to 1965. He was elected a fellow of the American Academy of Arts and Sciences in 1965. He served as a trustee of Tufts University, his alma mater, for 25 years, and was chairman of the Board of Trustees of Tufts University for five of those years. Earlier in his career, he worked at the Boston law firm of Nutter McClennen & Fish before working as an assistant United States attorney.
