= William Hepburn Russell (baseball) =

American lawyer

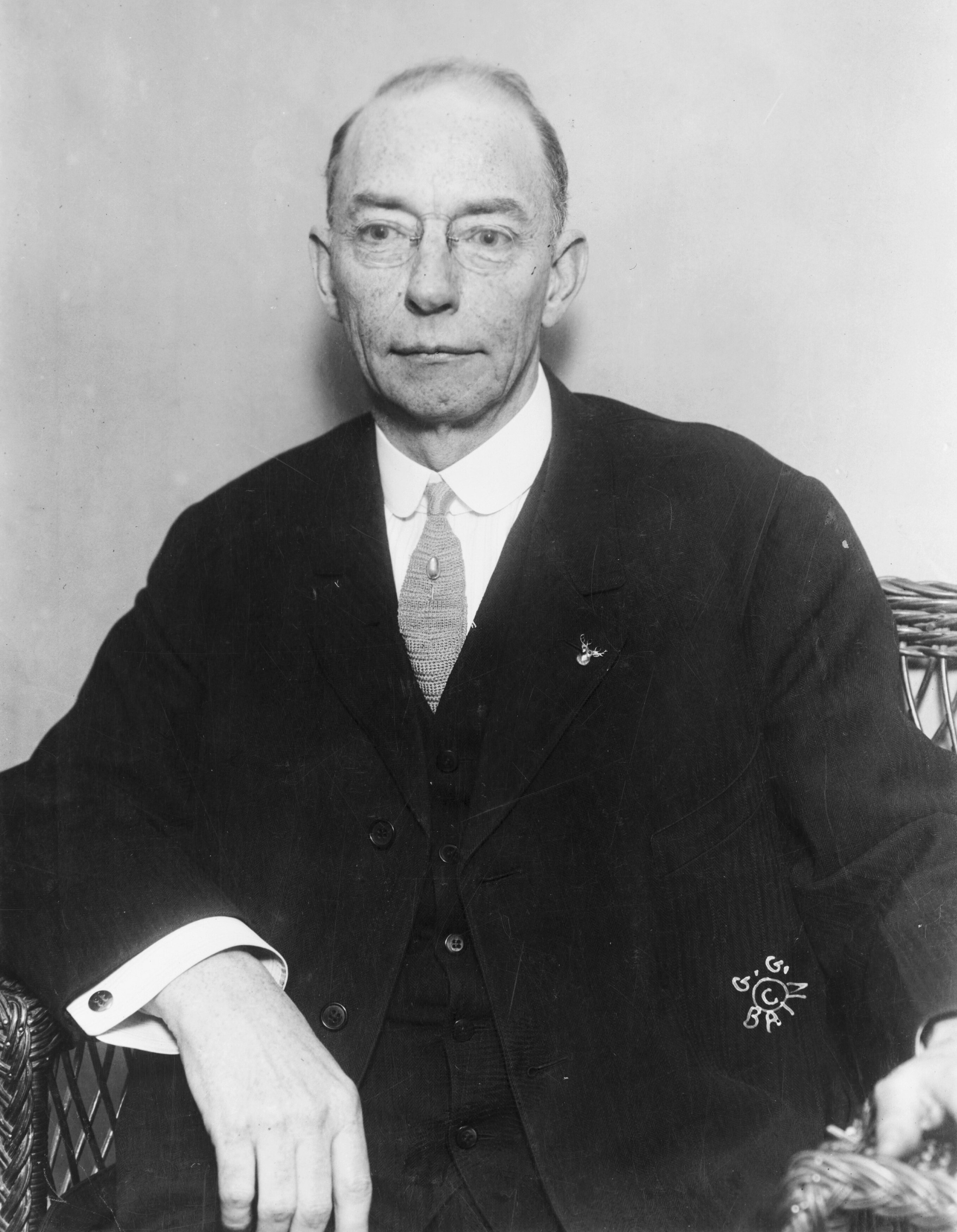
William Hepburn Russell

William Hepburn Russell (May 17, 1857 – November 21, 1911) was an American attorney and political figure who owned the Boston Rustlers of the National League in 1911.

== Early life ==
Russell was born on May 17, 1857, in Hannibal, Missouri, to Daniel and Matilda (Richmond) Russell. He attended public schools in Hannibal and graduated from a commercial college. On June 28, 1880, he married Mary Gushert, also of Hannibal.

Russell began his professional career as a reporter, city editor, and managing editor of the Hannibal Courier, Hannibal Clipper-Herald and Hannibal Journal.

== Legal career ==
In 1862, Russell was admitted to the Missouri state bar. From 1882 to 1884 he was the city attorney for Hannibal. In 1884 he moved to Indiana, where he worked as a general attorney for the Louisville, New Albany and Chicago Railroad. He later resided in Chattanooga, Tennessee, until 1895, when he moved to New York City.

Russell and William Beverly Winslow co-authored a digest of all the decisions of the Supreme Court of the United States.

== Politics ==
In 1892, Russell was a Democratic presidential elector. After moving to New York City, Russell affiliated himself with Tammany Hall, however, he left the organization in 1897. In 1902 he was elected chairman of the Greater New York Democratic executive committee. That same year he supported Seth Low in his campaign for Mayor of New York. Low later appointed Russell to the position of senior commissioner of accounts. He resigned this post in order to work for George B. McClellan Jr.'s mayoral campaign. When Richard Croker resigned his leadership position in Tammany Hall, Russell returned to the organization.

== Baseball and death ==
On December 17, 1910, Russell and Lewis Cloues Page, a Boston publisher, purchased controlling interest in the Boston National League baseball club from John P. Harris. Russell, who was in ill health, gave up his legal practice and moved to Boston, as he felt that running the club would be less stressful and help restore his health. However, Russell died on November 21, 1911, at his home in Manhattan.
