= Carcassonne Castle =

Residence in Marblehead, Massachusetts, United States

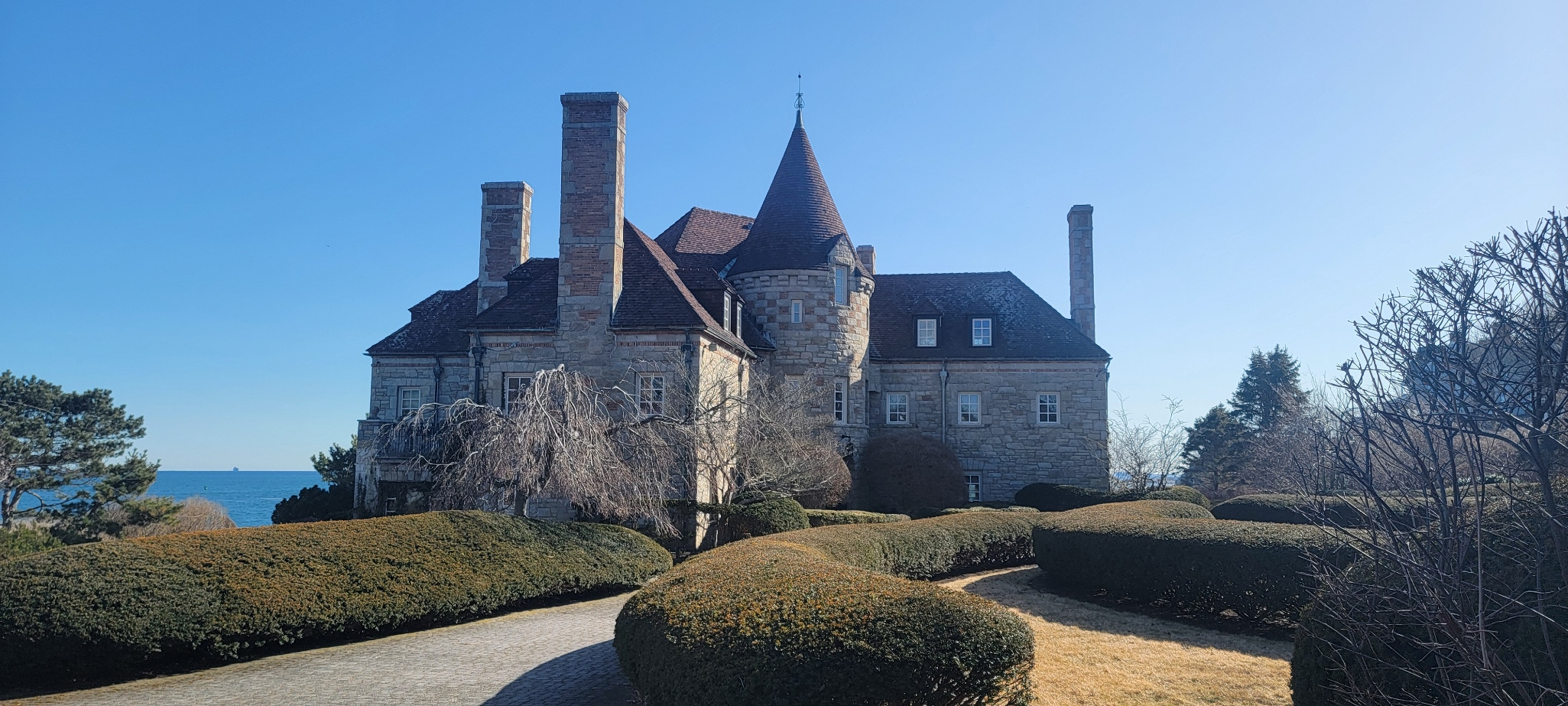
- Carcassonne Castle
- Interactive map of the Carcassonne Castle area
- Former names: Gove, William Henry and Aroline Chase Pinkham House
- Alternative names: Carcassonne – Rugo, Guido Lawrence and Beatrice V. House

General information
- Type: Residential
- Architectural style: 19th-century Châteauesque
- Location: 373 Ocean Ave, Marblehead, Massachusetts, United States
- Coordinates: 42.499278°N 70.834972°W
- Completed: 1935

Height
- Roof: Glazed Terra Cotta

Technical details
- Material: Ashlar Random Laid; Brick; Marble; Poured Concrete; Stone, Cut; Wood

Design and construction
- Architect: Gourdeau Construction Company
- Designations: Helicopter Pad; Secondary Dwelling House; Single Family Dwelling House
- Known for: Architecture; Landscape Architecture; Recreation; Women's History

Carcassonne Castle is a residence in Marblehead, Massachusetts, United States. It was completed in 1935 for Aroline Gove, daughter of Lydia Pinkham. During the 1970s and 80s it was owned by George A. Butler, who held glitzy parties in the three-story, 23-room granite castle.

== Construction ==
Construction on Carcassonne took place during The Great Depression. Granite was hauled from the South Shore, wood was imported from Australia, Mexico, Venezuela, and Africa, and marble was brought in from around the world. The cost of construction was $500,000. Gove received a commendation from President Franklin Delano Roosevelt for putting many unemployed craftsmen to work. Carcassonne was built by Gourdeau Construction Co. of Hamilton, Massachusetts.

== Layout ==
Carcassonne has a tri-level symmetrical floor plan designed around a central circular tower. It has 23 rooms and 11 baths, almost all of them have an ocean view. It includes seven fireplaces and a salt-water pool. It is located on 2.5 acres, which includes 307 feet of ocean beachfront. Gove purchased 25,000 plants for the landscaping, however she insisted on not planting any high shrubbery or trees in order not to obstruct the public's view of the Carcassonne or the ocean.

== Owners ==
=== Aroline Pinkham Gove ===
Before and after her husband's death Aroline P. Gove (1885–1939) was active in real estate as an investment, buying property in Boston's Back Bay, Peabody, Swampscott, Lynn, Danvers, and Salem. In 1927 Aroline P. Gove bought the estate known as Flying Point, on the southwest, oceanside end of Marblehead Neck, and she is shown as a summer resident on Ocean Avenue in Marblehead Neck in the 1934 directory. By July 1935, according to the Boston Herald, she was building herself a "new stone mansion" to the east, also on the ocean side of the neck. Modeled on and named for a castle she had visited in Carcassonne, France, during her extensive travels, the stone dwelling featured a central tower with four wings, poured concrete floors, and interior trim in white marble, black onyx, and exotic woods. The house cost $500,000, and the Herald reported in 1939 that she built it "to employ craftsmen from 35 different building trades" who were out of work during the Depression; President Franklin D. Roosevelt wrote her a letter "commending her for the move," the Herald stated.[7]

Aroline Gove lived only four years after building Carcassonne, which passed to her unmarried daughter Lydia Pinkham Gove (1885–1948) as did the post of treasurer in the Pinkham company; Lydia had assisted her mother since at least 1927, and the year before she hired an airplane and pilot and became the first woman to cross the country by air, from Los Angeles. Her mother took her first airplane in 1935, to fly to the District of Columbia to protest changes to the 1906 Pure Food and Drug Act.[8]

Aroline Gove died in 1939 and Carcassonne was inherited by her daughter, Lydia Pinkham Gove until her death in 1948.

=== Guido Rugo ===
On August 15, 1949, Guido Rugo purchased Carcassonne from the estate of Lydia Pinkham Gove for $50,000. In 1954, the Rugos hosted 500 guests for Archbishop Richard J. Cushing's 59th birthday. In 1964, the Rugos sold the house to attorney Robert J. DiGiacomo and his wife who sold it in 1966 to James Zografos, who sold it to Butler in 1973.

=== George A. Butler ===
In 1972, George A. Butler, the New England distributor of Toyota automobiles, purchased Carcassonne. He decorated the castle with a number of unique objects, including a jewelry case made out of an ostrich egg, an impala skeleton, and a painting of Muhammad Ali inscribed by the boxer. Butler also had a private helipad, a small theater, and four tiers of gardens. Butler hosted a number of benefit parties at Carcassonne for the Boston Children's Hospital and his other favorite charities. Carcassonne's annual benefit for the Boys & Girls Clubs of Boston, known as "Pique-Nique au Bord de Mer" (picnic by the sea), drew a number of famous guests, including Joan Kennedy, John Havlicek, Mike Eruzione, Francis X. Bellotti, Frank Avruch, Tom Ellis, Don Gillis, and Thomas P. O'Neill III. Peter Duchin performed at the 1980 event. He also hosted fundraisers for the Massachusetts Democratic Party. Butler sold Carcassonne in 1982. He stated that he decided to sell the home because its dampness aggravated his asthma and its small windows obstructed his view of the ocean. Butler and his wife moved into smaller home three doors down from Carcassonne.

=== Later ownership ===
Condominium developer William Lilly purchased Carcassonne from Butler for $1 million. In 1991, the property was foreclosed on by 1st American Bank for Savings. It was sold by the Federal Deposit Insurance Corporation at a sealed-bid auction. The minimum bid was $1.53 million. At the time, Carcassonne was assessed at $3.4 million. In 1992, Carcassonne's new owners, the Gianatasio family, gave the mansion an extensive makeover.
