= Joseph Donahue (poet) =

American poet, critic, and editor

Joseph Donahue (born 1954) is an American poet, critic, and editor. Born in Dallas, Texas and growing up in Lowell, Massachusetts, Donahue attended Dartmouth College for his undergraduate degree and went on to Columbia University and lived for many years in New York City. He now resides in Durham, North Carolina, where he is a professor of the Practice at Duke University.

== Poetry collections by Joseph Donahue ==
- Before Creation (1989)
- Monitions of the Approach (1991)
- World Well Broken (1995)
- Terra Lucida (1998)
- Terra Lucida XVI-XX (1999)
- Incidental Eclipse (2003)
- In This Paradise: Terra Lucida XXI-XL (2004)
- Dark Church (2015)
- Red Flash on a Black Field (2015)
- Wind Maps I-VII (2018)
- The Disappearance of Fate (2019)

== Anthologies edited by Joseph Donahue ==
- Primary Trouble: An Anthology of Contemporary American Poetry (1996; with Edward Foster and Leonard Schwartz)
- The World in Time and Space: Towards a History of Innovative American Poetry in Our Time (2002; with Edward Foster)

=== Critical reception ===
Of Donahue's collection Incidental Eclipse, John Ashbery has written "Something is going under, something is coming to the surface; each is documented by two voices, one speaking in italics. There is little comfort here, but there is glamor in the inevitable, 'incidental' screen of darkness moving across the light. This sequence confirms Donahue as one of the major American poets of this time."

Of the same collection, the poet Gustaf Sobin has stated that "In these sustained breath-strips, life's disparate, hopelessly disassociated elements find themselves spliced into single, all-inclusive sequences. In associating myth with matter, our deepest longings with our most dire anxieties, Donahue strikes an uninterrupted series of grace notes..."

== See also ==
- Daniel Donahue (uncle)
