= John Quinn (baseball executive) =

American baseball executive

John J. Quinn
- Born: April 1, 1908; Columbus, Ohio, U.S.
- Died: September 20, 1976 (aged 68); Stanton, California, U.S.
- Occupation: Baseball executive

John Jacob Quinn (April 1, 1908 – September 20, 1976) was an American executive in Major League Baseball. His career spanned over 40 years and included almost 28 full seasons as a general manager in the National League for the Boston / Milwaukee Braves and Philadelphia Phillies. He produced three National League pennants and one World Series championship during his 1945–58 tenure with the Braves.

Quinn was a member of one of the game's most prominent multi-generational families. During the era between the end of World War I and the end of World War II, his father, J. A. Robert Quinn, held various senior management and ownership positions in baseball: business manager of the St. Louis Browns, general manager of the Brooklyn Dodgers, and owner/general manager of both the Boston Red Sox and Boston Braves. John J. Quinn's son, son-in-law and grandson have also been senior baseball executives.

Quinn was born in Columbus, Ohio, during the period when his father was the president and business manager of the minor league Columbus Senators.

== General manager of Braves and Phillies ==
=== Boston/Milwaukee Braves (1945–1958) ===
A graduate of Boston College, Quinn worked with his father in the Red Sox front office, then rejoined J. A. Robert Quinn with Boston's National League franchise from 1936 to 1945, serving as club treasurer and, later, farm system director. He succeeded his father as the Braves' general manager in 1945, working under the club's new ownership group headed by Lou Perini. He served in the GM post through the 1958 season, from the Braves' final seven years in Boston through their highly successful first six years as the Milwaukee Braves, winning the 1948 National League pennant in Boston, and the 1957 World Series and 1958 NL title in Milwaukee.

Quinn's 1948 Boston team was anchored by starting pitchers Johnny Sain and Warren Spahn. Sain was acquired by the elder Quinn in a minor league transaction in 1942, and Spahn (a future Hall of Famer and baseball's winningest-all-time left-handed pitcher) came up through John Quinn's farm system. Tommy Holmes, the club's star right fielder, had been obtained from the New York Yankees in a December 1941 trade; he was the runner-up in 1945's National League Most Valuable Player balloting. However, the younger Quinn was instrumental in building the 1948 Braves. He added both young players such as shortstop Alvin Dark, signed in 1946, first baseman Earl Torgeson and pitcher Vern Bickford, and veterans acquired in trades like second baseman Eddie Stanky, third baseman Bob Elliott and left fielder Jeff Heath. Quinn acquired so many supporting pieces from the perennially contending St. Louis Cardinals that his postwar Braves were often called the "Cape Cod Cardinals".

Quinn also broke the baseball color line in Boston by purchasing the contract of fleet center fielder Sam Jethroe from the Dodgers; as a first-year player with the 1950 Braves, Jethroe was selected the National League's Rookie of the Year. Under Quinn, the Braves became the fifth of the then-16 Major League teams to integrate, and the third in the National League.

His Milwaukee champions of the 1950s relied heavily on the Braves' productive farm system, which developed Hall of Famers Eddie Mathews and Henry Aaron, All-Star catcher Del Crandall, shortstop Johnny Logan, starting pitcher Bob Buhl and starting outfielders Wes Covington and Bill Bruton, among many others. Quinn also acquired three key contributors via trades: Lew Burdette, the Braves' ace right-handed starting pitcher, who came from the Yankees as a rookie in a late-season 1951 transaction for Sain; slugging first baseman Joe Adcock, obtained from the Cincinnati Redlegs in a four-team trade just before spring training in 1953; and veteran second baseman Red Schoendienst, another future Hall of Famer, who was the centerpiece of a major midseason 1957 deal with the New York Giants. The Milwaukee Braves' home attendance shattered National League records during Quinn's tenure, never dipping below 1.749 million fans and exceeding the two-million mark for four straight years (1954–57).

=== Philadelphia Phillies (1959–1972) ===
Quinn left the Braves, the defending National League champion, in January 1959 to take the reins of the cellar-dwelling Philadelphia Phillies as general manager. Within five years, Quinn rebuilt the Phillies into contenders. Quinn's reconstruction project produced three more last place finishes (1959–61) before the Phillies broke the .500 mark in 1962 and finished in the first division in 1963.

Led by players Quinn signed or acquired via trades—starting pitcher (and future Baseball Hall of Famer) Jim Bunning, relief ace Jack Baldschun, infielders Dick Allen, Cookie Rojas and Tony Taylor, outfielders Johnny Callison, Tony González and ex-Brave Covington, and catcher Clay Dalrymple, among others—his 1964 Phillies were on the verge of winning the club's third pennant in its long history. But they suffered a nightmarish ten-game losing streak in late September to fall out of the league lead and finish second. Quinn then was faced with a second rebuilding job during the late 1960s. In his final trade, he acquired another future Hall of Fame pitcher, Steve Carlton, from the Cardinals on February 25, 1972. However, the Phillies' continued struggles on the field during the 1972 season led to Quinn's replacement as GM by Paul Owens, the club's farm system and scouting director, on June 3.

== Family ==
Quinn represented the second generation in his family's five-generation participation in baseball management. His son Bob was a longtime executive in the game who served as general manager of the Yankees, Cincinnati Reds and San Francisco Giants; another son, Jack, was the owner and general manager of the Hawaii Islanders of the Triple-A Pacific Coast League and also served as GM of the St. Louis Blues franchise in the National Hockey League. His daughter Margo married longtime baseball executive Roland Hemond. His granddaughter, Kay Quinn, is currently an anchor for KSDK in St. Louis. His great-grandson Bob Quinn (born 1968) is the former executive vice president, finance and administration, and chief financial officer of the Milwaukee Brewers. Currently, he serves as part of the Milwaukee Brewers ownership team, and is the current President of the Brewers affiliate club the Wilson Warbirds. Quinn’s great-great-grandchildren, Collin, Carolyn, and Kathryn, comprise the fifth generation of the Quinn family to work in baseball. Collin serves as an analyst in the Milwaukee Brewers' financial/accounting department, Carolyn is Manager of Partnerships for the Wilson Warbirds, and Kathryn has held positions across multiple professional sports organizations, including the Milwaukee Brewers.

John J. Quinn briefly scouted for the Houston Astros after he left Philadelphia. He died at age 68 in Stanton, California, on September 20, 1976.

| Preceded by J. A. Robert Quinn | Boston/Milwaukee Braves general manager 1945–1959 | Succeeded by John McHale |
| Preceded by Roy Hamey | Philadelphia Phillies general manager 1959–1972 | Succeeded by Paul Owens |
