= Ivers Whitney Adams =

American baseball entrepreneur (1838–1914)

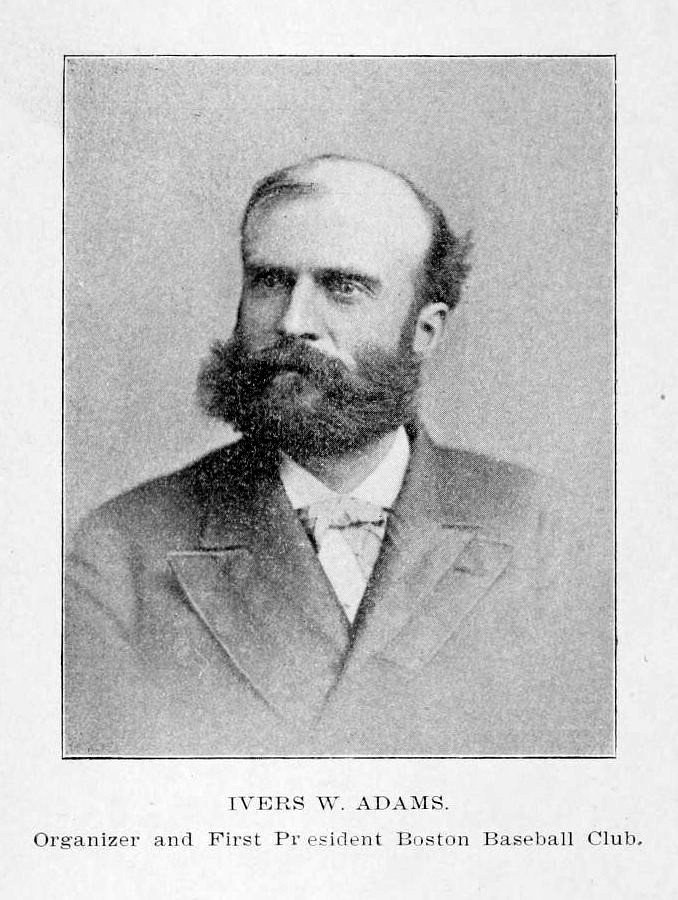

Ivers Whitney Adams (May 20, 1838 – October 10, 1914) was an American baseball executive and businessperson, and founder of the first professional baseball team in Boston, the Boston Red Stockings.

== Baseball ==
Adams was the founder, organizer and first president of the Boston Base Ball Association, the legal corporation that operated the baseball club initially known as the Boston Red Stockings. The club was Boston's first professional baseball team and continues to operate today as the Atlanta Braves. It is the longest continuously operating team in Major League Baseball. On January 20, 1871, the Boston Base Ball Association was legally organized by Adams with $15,000 raised from investors and the commitment of Harry Wright, manager of America's first professional baseball team, the Cincinnati Red Stockings brought in to manage the new Boston club.

"To Ivers W. Adams belongs the credit of first conceiving the idea of a professional baseball team for our city. Mr. Adams' interest in outdoor athletic sports in a general way, more particularly in baseball, led him to consider the possibility of establishing such a team for Boston. Could a team be secured whose members were temperate men, honest in their efforts to win, and proficient in this sport? Could satisfactory backing be found for it in Boston after the eliminating of pool and liquor selling on the grounds, factors then in vogue with most of the semi-professional teams in existence in different parts of the country? Mr. Adams carefully considered the matter months before the first step was taken, finally deciding if the right men could be found he would make the effort.

The attention of the baseball world in 1870 was turned to the Red Stockings of Cincinnati. The Wrights, Harry and George, were known to be the leading spirits of that team. Mr. Adams' attention was called to them, and in conversation with a leading local cricketer at that time, he became convinced the Wrights were the men wanted, and failing to secure them, the effort would be abandoned. A correspondence was opened, resulting in Mr. Adams visiting Cincinnati and meeting the Wrights. Subsequently George came to Boston, and during the following few weeks, while here as Mr. Adams' guest and in constant communication with Harry in Cincinnati, the first Boston team was determined upon at a meeting held at the Parker House on January 10, 1870."

-From George V. Tuohey (1897). A History of the Boston Baseball Club – A concise and accurate history of Base Ball from its inception. Boston: M.F. Quinn & Co. p. 64.

== Business career ==
Adams was a native of Ashburnham, Massachusetts. He left the town at the age of 19 to seek his fortune in Boston. He became the president of the American Net and Twine Company, which was the largest manufacturer of its kind in the world at that time. Throughout his life Adams kept an interest in the activities of his home community. Adams was an enthusiastic sportsman, having a fishing lodge in Canada from which he sent his Ashburnham friends fresh salmon, as well as a hunting preserve in Virginia. He was interested in the propagation of fish, and for some years leased from the town of Ashburnham, Upper Naukeag Lake, on Millers River where he maintained a summer home on an island. He was a great-grandson of John Adams, the pioneering settler known as "The Centenarian" who arrived in Ashburnham in 1765. Through this lineage, he was a first cousin to prominent Boston attorney Melvin O. Adams.

One of Ashburnham's problems that concerned Adams was the town's inadequate water system. Adams presented Ashburnham with a new water system, which included a pumping station at Upper Naukeag Lake, a storage tank at Bulkeleys Corner and six and a half miles of new water mains. The town's new water system was dedicated on Columbus Day in 1912. Adams was the guest of honor.

Adams commissioned Bela Pratt's sculpture, Ashburnham's Schoolboy of 1850, which was presented to the town of Ashburnham and Schools by Adams in 1913, a year before his death. The statue is a life size bronze figure on a granite base and depicts a 12-year-old schoolboy walking to his one-room district school in 1850. The boy is barefoot, wears a straw hat and is carrying a writing slate and lunch pail. Adams gifted the statue to the town, drawing on his own upbringing to honor and encourage young country boys to value their education and to encourage them to take their love of nature, community spirit and creative thinking, learned in the Ashburnham pioneering woods, out into the wider world.

The Schoolboy Statue of 1850 stands now at the corner of School and Main Street, near the entrance of Cushing Academy.

== Death ==
He died on October 10, 1914, and is buried behind Cushing Academy in the New Ashburnham Community Cemetery.
