= John P. Harris =

American businessman and politician (1871–1926)

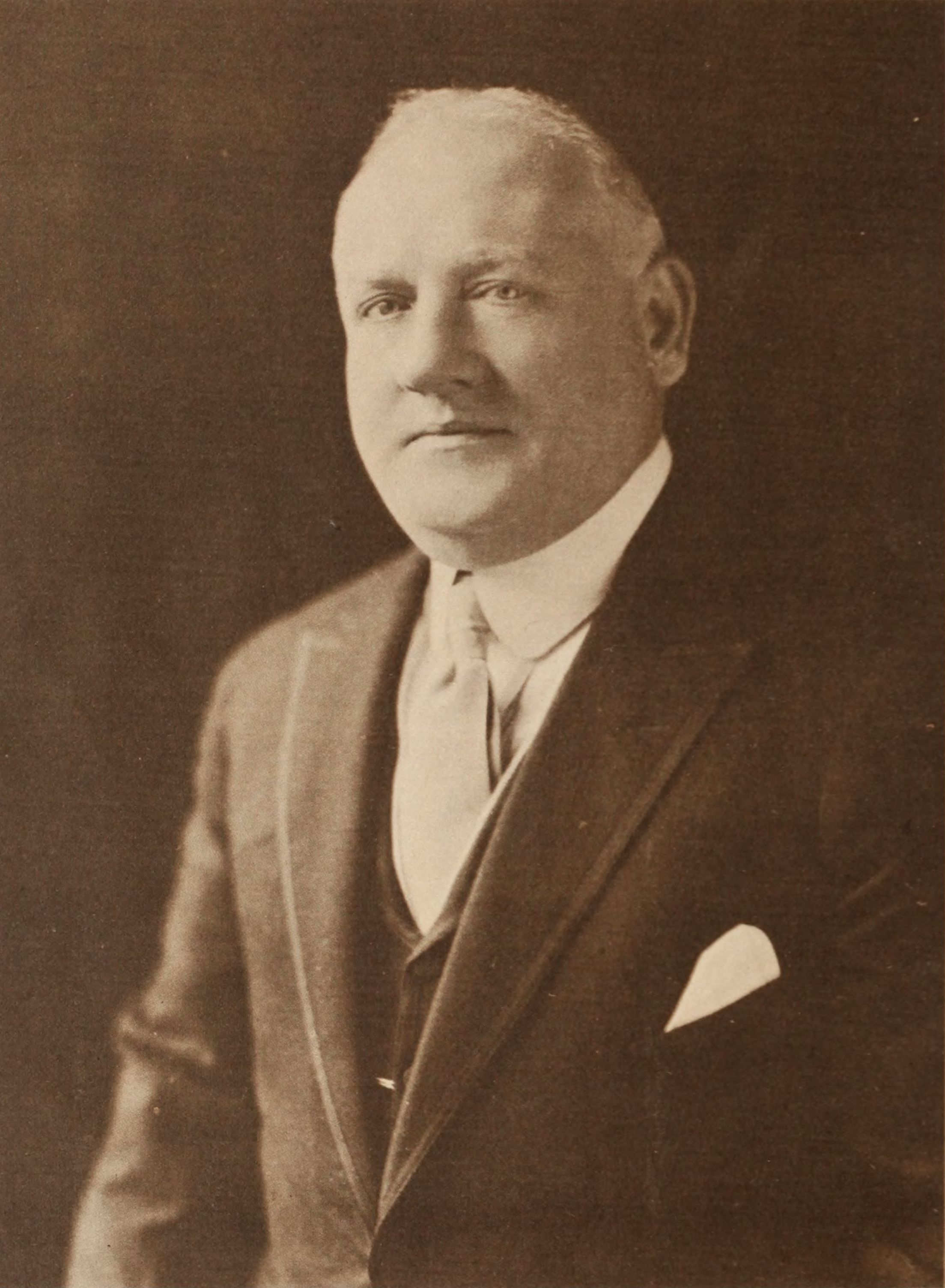

Member of the Pennsylvania Senate from the 45th District
- In office 1922–1926
- Preceded by: Norman Whitten
- Succeeded by: Frank Joseph Harris

Personal details
- Born: John Paul Harris; December 4, 1871
- Died: January 26, 1926 (aged 54) Pennsylvania State Capitol; Harrisburg, Pennsylvania
- Party: Republican
- Children: 4 (including John H. Harris)
- Profession: Movie theater owner

John Paul Harris (December 4, 1871 – January 26, 1926) was a Pittsburgh businessman and politician who opened the world's first theater devoted entirely to showing Motion pictures.

== Business career ==
Harris was born on December 4, 1871, to John and Bridget (Gaughan) Harris. Harris' father was a vaudeville producer and Harris' work in the entertainment industry began with his father's company, Harris Comedy and Specialty Co. In 1897 Harris Comedy and Specialty Co. showed Pittsburgh's first motion picture. On June 19, 1905, Harris and his brother-in-law, Harry Davis opened a small film theater on a Smithfield Street storefront in Downtown Pittsburgh. The theater, known as the Nickelodeon, was the first devoted exclusively for the exhibition of movies. The Harris-Davis company owned theaters in Western Pennsylvania, Ohio, Virginia, and New York.

In addition to owning theaters, Harris held shares in two National League baseball clubs. From November 15, 1910, to December 17, 1910, Harris served as the principal owner of the Boston Doves. Following his sale of the Boston club, Harris purchased interest in the Pittsburgh Pirates.

== Politics ==
In 1922, Harris was elected to represent the 45th District in the Pennsylvania State Senate to fill the unexpired term caused by the death of Norman Whitten. In 1924, Harris was elected to a full four-year term. In 1925, Harris became a support of Governor Gifford Pinchot. Although the two had many differing views, Harris supported Pinchot's efforts to enforce prohibition and enact election reform. On January 26, 1926, Harris suffered a heart attack during a legislative hearing on election reform bills. He died soon thereafter. He was succeeded in the Senate by his brother Frank Joseph Harris.

== Legacy ==
The Harris Theater in Pittsburgh is named in honor of Harris.

The John P. Harris Film Society, Point Park University's cinema club, is named after Harris.
