= Bob Quinn (baseball, born 1870) =

American baseball executive

- Born: February 14, 1870; Columbus, Ohio, U.S.
- Died: March 12, 1954 (aged 84); Providence, Rhode Island, U.S.
- Occupations: Owner of the Boston Red Sox (1923–1933); President, part owner of the Boston Braves (1936–1945); President, National Baseball Hall of Fame and Museum (1948–1951)
- Children: John J. Quinn

James Aloysius Robert Quinn (February 14, 1870 – March 12, 1954), often referred to as J. A. Robert Quinn, was an American executive in Major League Baseball who became renowned for his management of four different franchises.

== Career ==
Born in Columbus, Ohio, Quinn was a catcher in minor league baseball during the 1890s, also managing some of the teams for which he played. From 1902 to 1917, he served as general manager of the Columbus Senators in the American Association; he was also among the founders of that league. In 1908, he founded and was president of the Ohio State League, a Class D minor league (equivalent to a Rookie-level league today) which began operation as a six team league with teams located in Central/Southern Ohio. He became general manager of the St. Louis Browns from 1917 to 1922, developing the perennially poor team into one which lost the 1922 American League pennant by a single game.

In the summer of 1923, fresh off that success, Quinn put together a syndicate that purchased the Boston Red Sox from Harry Frazee. The purchase was financed by four investors who knew him from his days in Columbus, with the largest contribution coming from glass magnate Palmer Winslow. The investors trusted Quinn enough to make him president and operating head of the franchise. Quinn had every intention of rebuilding a team that had been rendered bereft of talent after Frazee's chronic cash shorts forced him to sell nearly every talented player to the New York Yankees. To that end, he spent $250,000 on minor league stars However, in a case of exceptionally bad timing, Winslow fell ill in 1924 and largely withdrew from financing the team. He died in 1926, and the three surviving members of Quinn's syndicate didn't have nearly enough money between them to make up for the loss of Winslow's investment.

For the remainder of Quinn's tenure as owner of the Red Sox, the team was severely underfinanced. The team lost over $200,000 from 1924 to 1929. This led to a vicious circle in which lack of talent on the field sent attendance through the floor, thus denying Quinn money that could have been used to acquire more players or retain the few good players he had. As a result, Quinn's tenure as owner was, statistically speaking, the darkest in franchise history. With rosters made up mostly of castoffs from other AL teams, they finished dead last in the American League eight times during Quinn's ten years as owner, only rising as high as sixth twice. They finally bottomed out in 1932, with a 43–111 (.279) record that is still the worst in franchise history.

By the 1932–33 offseason, Quinn knew he was at the end of his tether. He needed to borrow against his life insurance just to send the team to spring training. Realizing that there was no way he could operate the Red Sox in 1933, he began searching for a buyer. He found his white knight in lumber magnate Tom Yawkey, who had been looking to buy a baseball team as soon as he turned 30 and gained full access to money in a trust fund set up for him by his uncle and adoptive father, former Detroit Tigers owner Bill Yawkey. Former baseball great Eddie Collins, who had attended the same prep school as Yawkey, set up a meeting between Yawkey and Collins during the 1932 World Series. The $1.5 million deal closed just before the start of 1933 spring training, and just days after Yawkey turned 30. Supposedly, the $1.5 million from the sale of the team was only enough for Quinn to pay off all of his debts from his owning the Red Sox, with no money left over for himself. Quinn later said that once the team was sold, "I was broke and out of a job, but I was free of debt. I breathed a sigh of relief when it was all over."

Quinn then became general manager of the Brooklyn Dodgers for two seasons (1934–1935) before joining the Boston Braves as team president and part owner from 1936 to 1945. After his 1945 retirement, he briefly served as a sporting goods executive, and then became president of the Baseball Hall of Fame from 1948 to 1951, leaving that position after suffering two strokes.

== Patriarch of sports family ==
Quinn died at age 84 in Providence, Rhode Island, and was buried at Saint Joseph Cemetery in Lockbourne, Ohio. His son John J. Quinn took over as the general manager of the Braves following his father's retirement, continuing after the team moved to Milwaukee in 1953, and later served as GM of the Philadelphia Phillies. Another son, Rev. Robert G. Quinn, was the athletic director at Providence College. His grandson Bob Quinn was the general manager of the New York Yankees, Cincinnati Reds, and San Francisco Giants between 1988 and 1996, and his grandson Jack Quinn served as president of the St. Louis Blues franchise in the National Hockey League. His great-grandson Bob Quinn (born 1968) is the former executive vice president, finance and administration, and chief financial officer of the Milwaukee Brewers. Currently, he serves as part of the Milwaukee Brewers ownership team, and is the current President of the Brewers affiliate club the Wilson Warbirds. Quinn’s great-great-grandchildren, Collin, Carolyn, and Kathryn, comprise the fifth generation of the Quinn family to work in baseball. Collin serves as an analyst in the Milwaukee Brewers' financial/accounting department, Carolyn is Manager of Partnerships for the Wilson Warbirds, and Kathryn has held positions across multiple professional sports organizations, including the Milwaukee Brewers.

== See also ==
- Honor Rolls of Baseball

Sporting positions
| Preceded by Harry Frazee | Owner of the Boston Red Sox; August 2, 1923 – February 25, 1933 | Succeeded by Tom Yawkey |
| Preceded by Harry Frazee | Boston Red Sox President; 1923–1933 | Succeeded by Tom Yawkey |
