= Boston Braves =

Former American baseball team

Logo	Cap insignia

Information
- League: National League (1876–1952)
- Ballpark: Braves Field (1915–1952)
- Established: 1871
- Relocated: 1953 (to Milwaukee; became the Milwaukee Braves)
- World Series championships: 1: 1914
- Pre-modern World Series championships: 1: 1892
- National League pennants: 10: 1877; 1878; 1883; 1891; 1892; 1893; 1897; 1898; 1914; 1948
- National Association pennants: 4: 1872; 1873; 1874; 1875
- Former name: Boston Bees (1936–1940); Boston Braves (1912–1935); (1941–1952); Boston Rustlers (1911); Boston Doves (1907–1910); Boston Beaneaters (1883–1906); Boston Red Caps (1876–1882); Boston Red Stockings (1871–1875)
- Former league: National Association (1871–1876)
- Former ballparks: Fenway Park (1914–1915); South End Grounds III (1894–1914); Congress Street Grounds (1894); South End Grounds II (1888–1894); South End Grounds I (1871–1887)
- Colors: Red, navy blue, white
- Ownership: List of owners: Ivers Whitney Adams (1871); John Conkey (1872); Charles H. Porter (1873–1874); Nicholas Apollonio (1875–1876); Arthur Soden (1877–1906); George Dovey (1906–1909); John Dovey (1906–1910); John P. Harris (1910); William Hepburn Russell (1910–1911); Russell estate (1911); James Gaffney (1911–1916); Percy Haughton (1916–1919); George Washington Grant (1919–1923); Emil Fuchs (1923–1935); Charles Adams (1935); Bob Quinn (1935–1944); Lou Perini (1944–1952)
- President: List of presidents: Ivers Whitney Adams (1871); John Conkey (1872); Charles H. Porter (1873–1874); Nicholas Apollonio (1875–1876); Arthur Soden (1877–1907); George Dovey (1907–1909); John Dovey (1909–1910); William Hepburn Russell (1910–1911); John Montgomery Ward (1911–1912); James E. Gaffney (1912–1916); Percy Haughton (1916–1918); George Washington Grant (1919–1923); Christy Mathewson (1923–1925); Emil Fuchs (1925–1935); Bob Quinn (1935–1945); Lou Perini (1945–1952)
- General manager: John Quinn (1950–1952)
- Manager: List of managers: Harry Wright (1871–1881); John Morrill (1882); Jack Burdock (1883); John Morrill (1883–1886); King Kelly (1898); John Morrill (1887–1888); Jim Hart (1889); Frank Selee (1890–1901); Al Buckenberger (1902–1904); Fred Tenney (1905–1907); Joe Kelley (1908); Frank Bowerman (1909); Harry Smith (1909); Fred Lake (1910); Fred Tenney (1911); Johnny Kling (1912); George Stallings (1913–1920); Fred Mitchell (1921–1923); Dave Bancroft (1924–1927); Jack Slattery (1928); Rogers Hornsby (1928); Emil Fuchs (1929); Bill McKechnie (1930–1937); Casey Stengel (1938–1942); Bob Coleman (1943); Casey Stengel (1943); Bob Coleman (1944–1945); Del Bissonette (1945); Billy Southworth (1946–1949); Johnny Cooney (1949); Billy Southworth (1950–1951); Tommy Holmes (1951–1952); Charlie Grimm (1952)

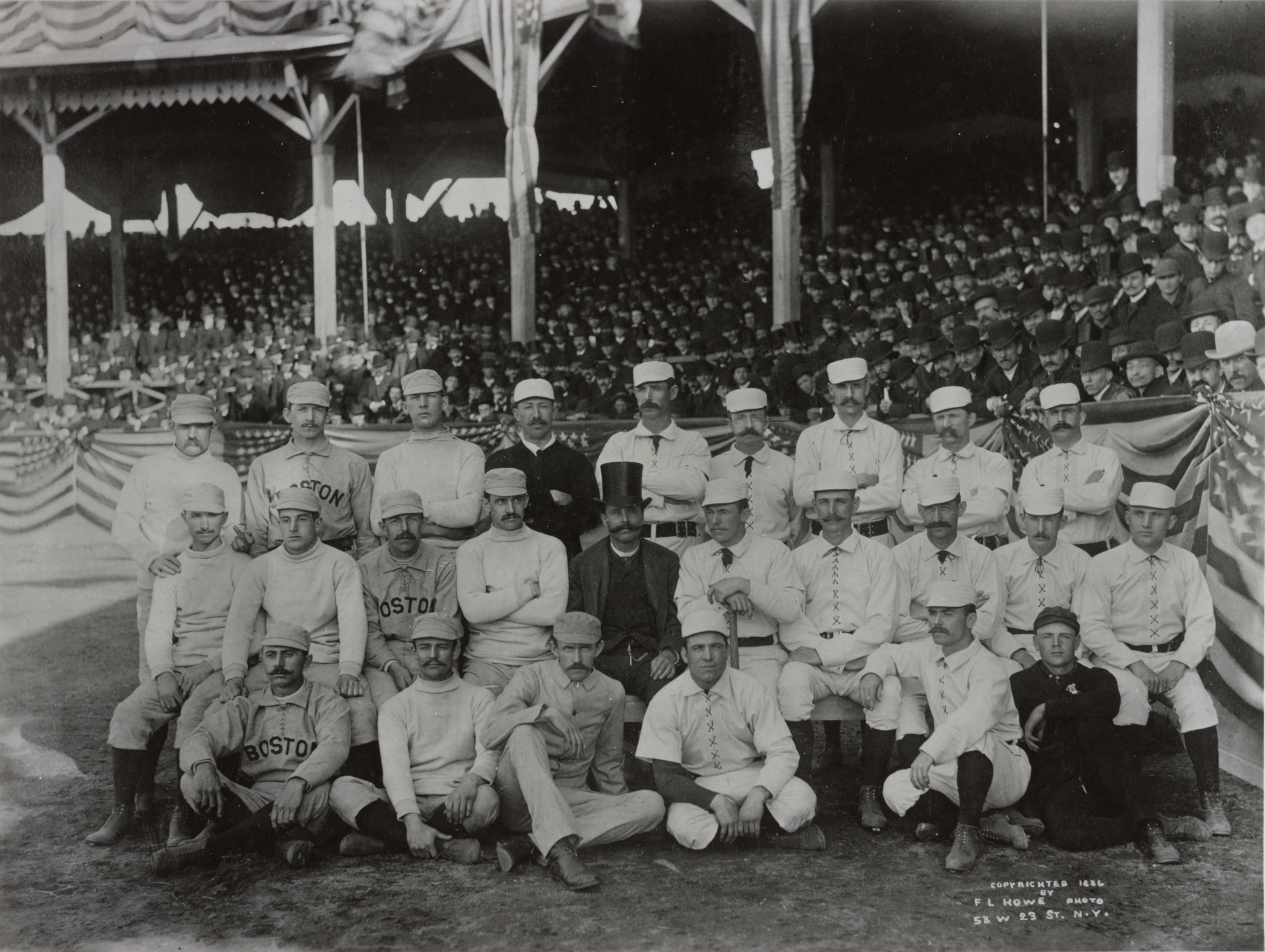
Charles "Old Hoss" Radbourn (standing, far left) giving the finger to the cameraman, the first known photograph of the gesture (1886)

The Boston Braves were a Major League Baseball team that played in Boston for the National League from 1871 to 1952. The team relocated to Milwaukee after the 1952 season, becoming the Milwaukee Braves, and subsequently moved to Atlanta in 1966.

During its 82-year stay in Massachusetts, the franchise was known by various nicknames, including the Red Stockings, Red Caps, Beaneaters, Rustlers, Bees, and "Braves". Their longest-lasting nickname was inspired by Tamanend, a chief of the Lenni-Lenape in the Delaware Valley. While in Boston, the team won 10 National League pennants and a World Series championship in 1914 that came after a season in which the Braves were in last place as late as July 15—a turnaround that led to the nickname "Miracle Braves". In 1948, the Braves reached the World Series largely as a result of their two dominant pitchers, Warren Spahn and Johnny Sain, who inspired the Boston Post slogan "Spahn and Sain and pray for rain." The Braves posted a losing record in all but 12 of the 38 seasons after their World Series win.

The Boston franchise played at South End Grounds from 1871 to 1914 and at Braves Field from 1915 to 1952. Braves Field is now Nickerson Field of Boston University. The franchise, from Boston to Milwaukee to Atlanta, is the oldest continuously operating professional baseball franchise.

The Boston Braves had an overall win–loss record of 5,118–5,598–138 (.478) during their 77-year major-league tenure in Boston. Six former Boston Braves players have been elected to the National Baseball Hall of Fame.

== History ==
=== Early history ===
The Cincinnati Red Stockings, established in 1869 as the first openly all-professional baseball team, voted to dissolve after the 1870 season. Player-manager Harry Wright then went to Boston, Massachusetts—at the invitation of Boston businessman Ivers Whitney Adams—with brother George Wright and two other Cincinnati players joined the Boston Red Stockings, a charter member of the National Association of Professional Base Ball Players. This team and its successors are the oldest continuously playing team in American professional sports. (The only other team that has been organized as long, the Chicago Cubs, did not play for the two years after the Great Chicago Fire of 1871.) Two players hired from the Forest City club of Rockford, Illinois, were pitcher Al Spalding (founder of Spalding sporting goods) and second baseman Ross Barnes.

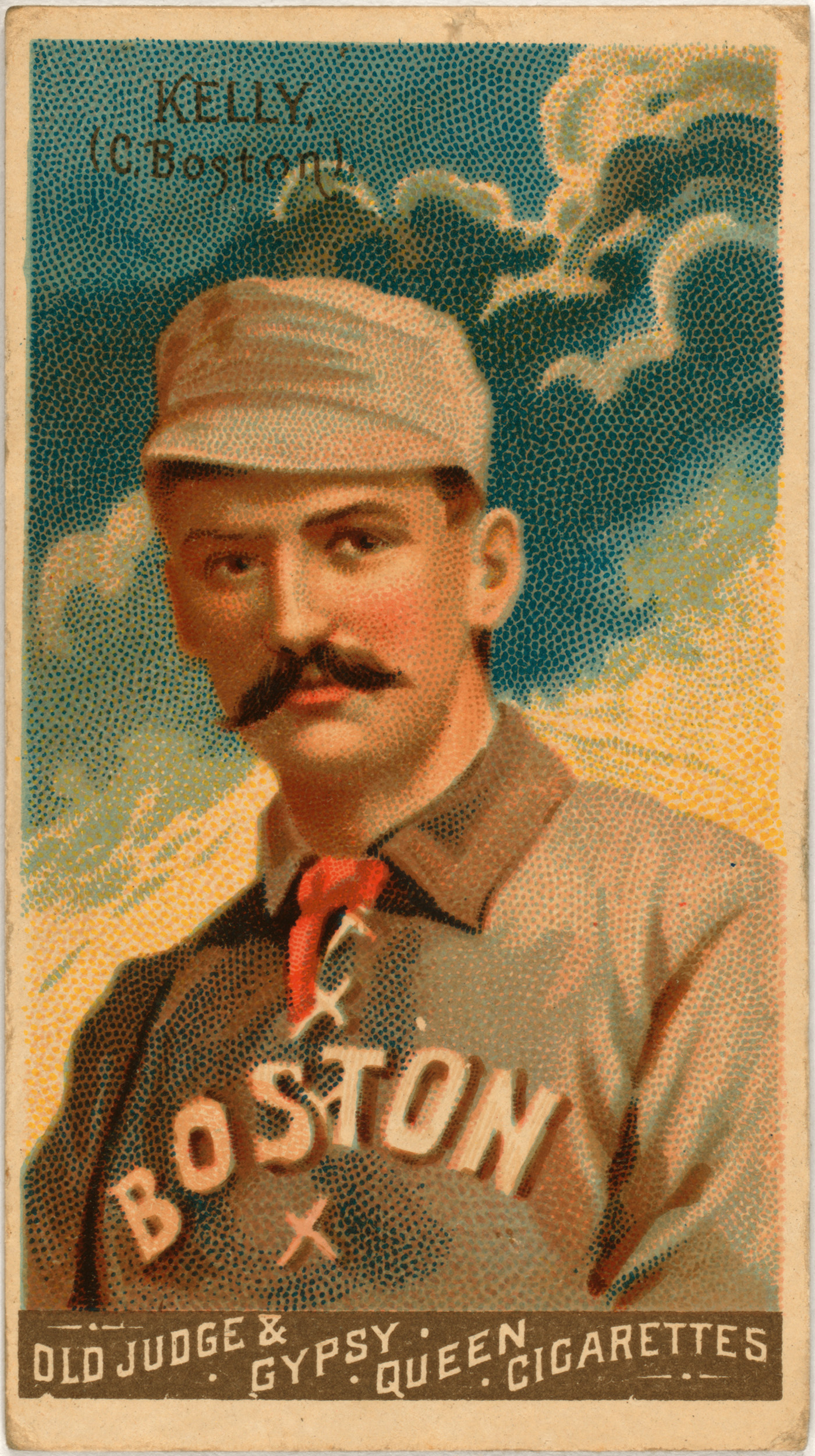
King Kelly cigarette card (Goodwin & Company, 1888)

Led by the Wright brothers, Barnes, and Spalding, the Red Stockings won four of the National Association's five championships. The team became one of the National League's charter franchises in 1876, sometimes called the "Red Caps" (as a new Cincinnati Red Stockings club was another charter member). Boston came to be called the Beaneaters by sportswriters in 1883, while retaining red as the team color.

Boston won the 1877 and 1878 pennants. The Red Caps/Beaneaters won eight pennants during the 19th century. Their manager was Frank Selee, the first manager not to double as a player as well. The 1898 team finished 102–47, a club record for wins that would stand for almost a century.

In 1894 the Braves became the first major league baseball team to wear letterforms on their uniform caps when they added a monogram-style device to their front.

In 1897, the Beaneaters, as runner-up in the National League, took part in the 1897 Temple Cup championship series against the Baltimore Orioles, losing in five games.

They only managed one winning season from 1900 to 1913, and lost 100 or more games six times. In 1907, the renamed Doves (temporarily) eliminated the red from their stockings because their manager thought the red dye could cause wounds to become infected (as noted in The Sporting News Baseball Guide during the 1940s when each team's entry had a history of its nickname(s). See details in History of baseball team nicknames). The American League club's owner, Charles Taylor, changed his team's name to the Red Sox in place of the "Americans".

When George and John Dovey acquired the club in 1907, the team was named the Doves; when purchased by William Hepburn Russell in 1911 reporters tried out Rustlers. The team adopted an official name, the Braves, for the first time in 1912. Their owner, James Gaffney, a member of New York City's Tammany Hall, tributed the team to Tamanend, "The Patron Saint of America," with the name and his image as the logo.

=== 1914: Miracle ===
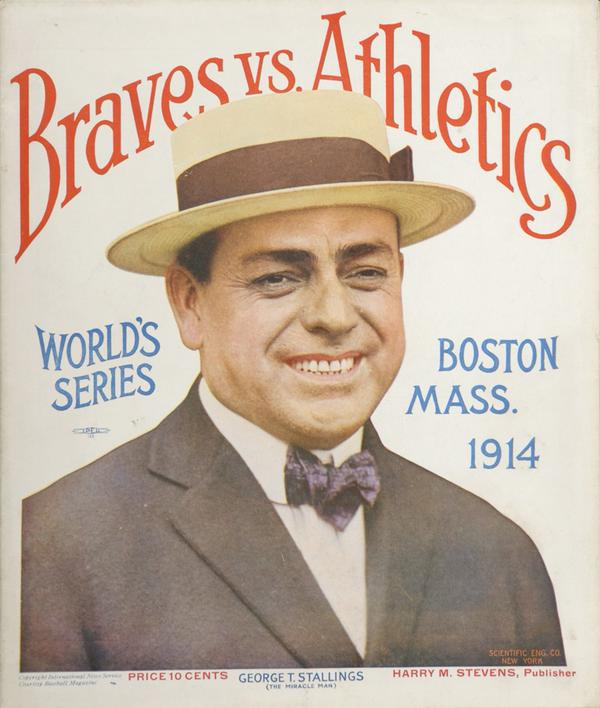
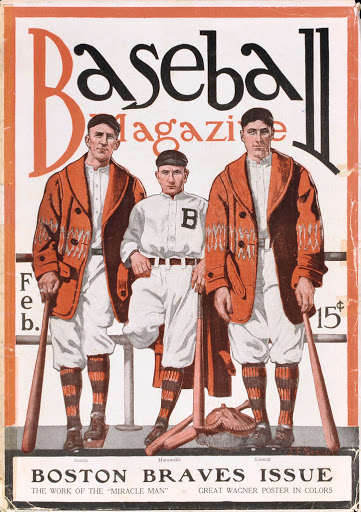
A program from the 1914 World Series, featuring Braves manager George Stallings (left). Baseball Magazine cover, 1914 (right)

Two years later, the Braves put together one of the most memorable seasons in baseball history. After a dismal 4–18 start, the Braves seemed to be on pace for a last place finish. On July 4, 1914, the Braves lost both games of a doubleheader to the Brooklyn Dodgers. The consecutive losses put their record at 26–40 and the Braves were in last place, 15 games behind the league-leading New York Giants, who had won the previous three league pennants. After a day off, the Braves put together a hot streak, and from July 6 through September 5, the Braves won 41 games against only 12 losses. On September 7 and 8, the Braves took 2 of 3 from the New York Giants and moved into first place. The Braves tore through September and early October, closing with 25 wins against 6 losses, while the Giants went 16–16. They are the only team to win a pennant after being in last place on the Fourth of July. They were in last place as late as July 18, but were close to the pack, moving into fourth on July 21 and second place on August 12.

Despite their comeback, the Braves entered the World Series as a heavy underdog to Connie Mack's Philadelphia Athletics. Nevertheless, the Braves swept the Athletics—the first unqualified sweep in the young history of the modern World Series (the 1907 World Series had one tied game)—to win the world championship. Meanwhile, former Chicago Cubs infielder Johnny Evers, in his second season with the Braves, won the Chalmers Award.

The Braves played the World Series (as well as the last few weeks of the 1914 regular season) at Fenway Park, since their normal home, the South End Grounds, was too small. However, the Braves' success inspired owner Gaffney to build a modern park, Braves Field, which opened in August 1915. It was the largest park in the majors at the time, with 40,000 seats and also a very spacious outfield. The park was novel for its time; public transportation brought fans right into the park.

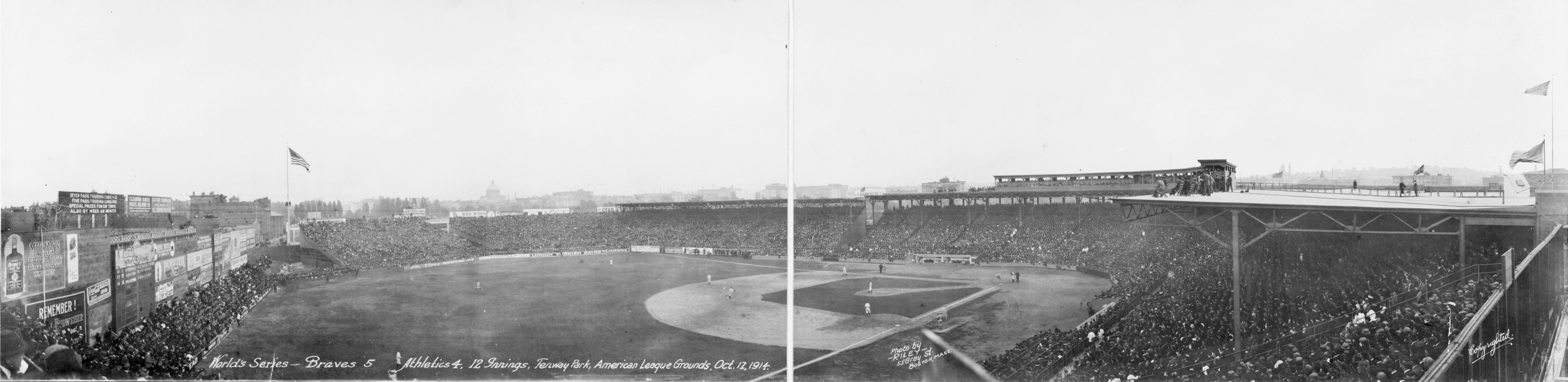
Fenway Park on October 12, 1914, for the third game of the 1914 World Series

=== 1915–1935: Losing years ===
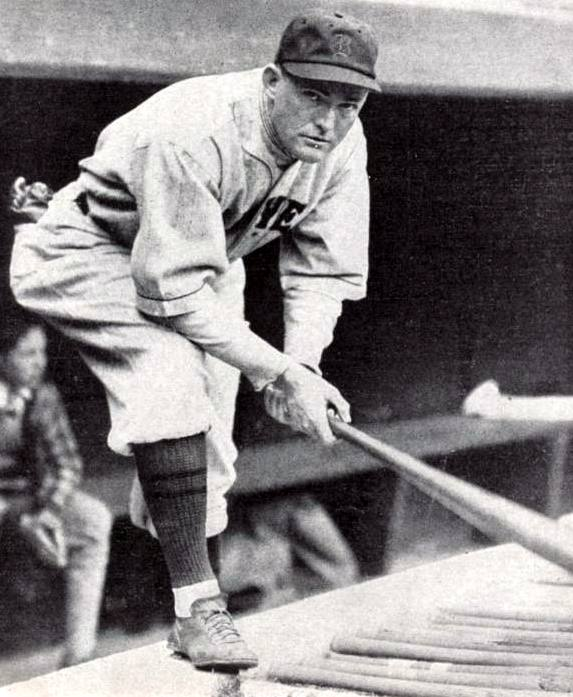
Hall of Famer Rogers Hornsby in 1928

After contending for most of 1915 and 1916, the Braves spent much of the next 19 years in mediocrity, during which they posted only three winning seasons (1921, 1933, and 1934). The lone highlight of those years came when Giants' attorney Emil Fuchs bought the team in 1923 to bring his longtime friend, pitching great Christy Mathewson, back into the game. Although original plans called for Mathewson to be the principal owner, he had never recovered from tuberculosis that he had contracted after being gassed during World War I. By the end of the 1923 season, it was obvious Mathewson could not continue even in a reduced role, and he would die two years later, with the result that Fuchs was permanently given the presidency. In 1928, the Braves traded for Hall of Famer Rogers Hornsby who had a very productive year in his only season with Boston. He batted .387 to win his seventh and final batting championship.

Fuchs was committed to building a winner, but the damage from the years before his arrival took some time to overcome. The Braves finally managed to compete in 1933 and 1934 under manager Bill McKechnie, but Fuchs' revenue was severely depleted due to the Great Depression.

==== Babe Ruth returns to Boston ====
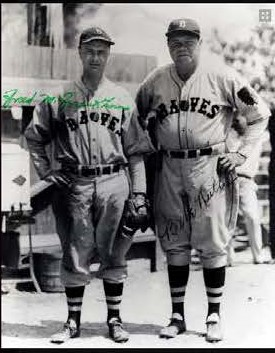
Babe Ruth (right) in 1935

Looking for a way to get more supporters and more money, Fuchs worked out a deal with the New York Yankees to acquire Babe Ruth, who had, coincidentally, started his career with the Boston Red Sox. Fuchs named Ruth vice president and assistant manager of the Braves, and promised him a share of team profits. He was also to be consulted on all player transactions. Fuchs even suggested that Ruth, who had long had his heart set on managing, could take over as manager once McKechnie stepped down—perhaps as early as 1936.

At first, it looked like Ruth was the final piece the team needed in 1935. On opening day, he had a hand in all of the Braves' runs in a 4–2 win over the Giants. However, this could not last. Opening Day proved to be the only time the Braves were over .500 all year. A 4–20 May ended any realistic chance of contention. At the same time, it became apparent that Ruth was finished even as a part-time player. While his high living of previous years had begun catching up with him a year earlier, his conditioning rapidly declined in the first month of 1935. While he was still able to hit at first, he could do little else. He could no longer run, and his fielding was so terrible that three of the Braves' pitchers threatened to go on strike if Ruth were in the lineup. Ruth soon discovered that he was vice president and assistant manager in name only, and Fuchs' promise of a share of team profits was hot air. In fact, Ruth discovered that Fuchs expected him to invest some of his money in the team.

Seeing a franchise in complete disarray, Ruth retired on June 1, only six days after he clouted what turned out to be the last three home runs of his career, in what remains one of the most memorable afternoons in baseball history. He had wanted to quit as early as May 12, but Fuchs wanted him to hang on so he could play in every National League park. By this time, the Braves were 9–27, their season all but over. They ultimately finished 38–115, easily the worst season in franchise history. Their .248 winning percentage is tied for the seventh-worst in baseball history, and the sixth-worst in National League history. It is the second-worst in modern baseball history (behind only the 1916 Philadelphia Athletics), and the worst in modern National League history.

=== 1936–1940: the Bees ===
Insolvent like his team, Fuchs was forced to give up control of the Braves in August 1935. The principal financial backer for the team, Charles F. Adams, was banned by Commissioner Landis from taking control of the team because Adams owned Suffolk Downs race track. Adams picked Bob Quinn as new owner. Quinn did not care for the Braves name, possibly because it was linked to former owner Gaffney and to New York's Tammany Hall politics and launched a contest for the general public with the regional sportswriters being the judges. Among 13,000 votes of 1,327 potential names, the team was renamed to the Boston Bees Keeping up with the Bees theme, Braves Field became nicknamed the Bee Hive. This did little to change the team's fortunes. After five uneven years, a new owner, construction magnate Lou Perini, changed the nickname back to the Braves.

=== 1948: National League champions ===
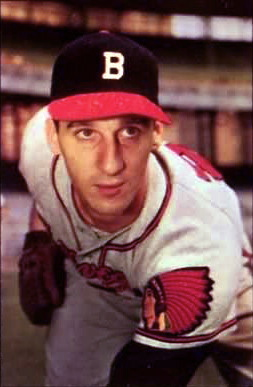
Hall of Fame pitcher Warren Spahn

In 1948, the team won the National League pennant by capturing 91 games to finish 61/2 places ahead of the second–place St. Louis Cardinals. They also attracted 1,455,439 fans to Braves Field, the third-largest gate in the National League and a high-water mark for the team's stay in Boston. The pitching staff was anchored by Hall of Famer Warren Spahn and Johnny Sain, who won 39 games between them. The remainder of the rotation was so thin that in September, The Boston Post writer Gerald Hern wrote this poem about the pair:

First we'll use Spahn
then we'll use Sain
Then an off day
followed by rain
Back will come Spahn
followed by Sain
And followed
we hope
by two days of rain.

The poem received such a wide audience that the sentiment, usually now paraphrased as "Spahn, Sain, then pray for rain" or "Spahn, Sain and two days of rain", entered the baseball vocabulary. Ironically, in the 1948 season, the Braves actually had a better record in games that Spahn and Sain did not start than in games they did. (Other sources include pitcher Vern Bickford in the verse.)

The Braves lost the 1948 World Series in six games to the Cleveland Indians (who had beaten the Red Sox in a tie-breaker game to spoil an all-Boston World Series). This turned out to be the Braves' last hurrah in Boston.

=== 1949–1952: Final years in Boston ===
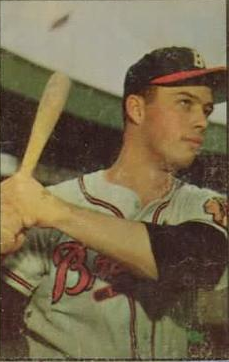
Hall of Famer Eddie Mathews (pictured in 1952) is the only player to have represented the Braves in the three American cities they have called home.

==== Sam Jethroe ====
Acquired earlier by trade from the Brooklyn Dodgers, on April 18, 1950, Sam "Jet" Jethroe was added to the Boston Braves roster. The Dodgers had another young CF in Duke Snider rising in their system, resulting in the trade to the Braves. Going on to be named National League Rookie of the Year at age 32, Jethroe broke the color barrier with Boston. In 1950, Jethroe hit .273 with 100 runs, 18 home runs and 58 RBI. His 35 stolen bases led the National League, a feat he would duplicate in 1951. While in Boston, Jethroe was a roommate of Chuck Cooper, of the Boston Celtics who was the first African-American player drafted by an NBA team. A former Negro leagues star and military veteran, Jethroe remains the oldest player to have won Rookie of the Year honors.

==== Move to Milwaukee and aftermath ====
Amid four mediocre seasons after 1948, attendance steadily dwindled, even though Braves Field had the reputation of being more family friendly than Fenway.

For a half century, not a single major league franchise had moved. The Braves played their last home game in Boston on September 21, 1952, losing to the Brooklyn Dodgers 8–2 before 8,822 at Braves Field; the home attendance for the 1952 season was under 282,000.

On March 13, 1953, owner Lou Perini said that he would seek permission from the National League to move the Braves to Milwaukee, Wisconsin. After the franchise's long history in Boston, the day became known as "Black Friday" in the city as fans mourned the team's exit after eight decades. Perini, however, pointed to dwindling attendance as the main reason for the move. He also announced that he had recently bought out his original partners. He announced Milwaukee as that was where the Braves had their top farm club, the Brewers. Milwaukee had long been a possible target for moving. Bill Veeck had tried to move his St. Louis Browns there earlier the same year (Milwaukee was the original home of that franchise), but his proposal had been voted down by the other American League owners.

Going into spring training in 1953, it appeared that the Braves would play another year in Boston unless the National League gave permission for the move. After a 3 1/2-hour meeting at the Vinoy Park Hotel in St. Petersburg, Florida, league approval was granted after Perini promised not to sell the team. During a game against the New York Yankees on March 18, the sale was announced final and that the team would move to Milwaukee, immediately. The All-Star Game had been scheduled for Braves Field. It was moved to Crosley Field and hosted by the Cincinnati Reds. The Braves franchise moved their triple-A Brewers from Milwaukee to Toledo, Ohio.

After the Braves moved to Milwaukee in 1953, the Braves Field site was sold to Boston University and reconstructed as Nickerson Field, the home of many Boston University teams. The Braves Field scoreboard was sold to the Kansas City A's and used at Municipal Stadium; the A's moved to Oakland after the 1967 season.

== Achievements ==
=== Baseball Hall of Famers ===
Boston Braves Hall of Famers
Affiliation according to the National Baseball Hall of Fame and Museum
Boston Braves

Earl Averill
Dave Bancroft
Dan Brouthers
**John Clarkson** *
Jimmy Collins
**Hugh Duffy** *
Johnny Evers

Burleigh Grimes
Billy Hamilton
Billy Herman
Rogers Hornsby
Joe Kelley
King Kelly
Ernie Lombardi

**Rabbit Maranville** *
Rube Marquard
Eddie Mathews
**Tommy McCarthy** *
Bill McKechnie
Joe Medwick
**Kid Nichols** *
Jim O'Rourke
Charley Radbourn

Babe Ruth
Frank Selee *
Al Simmons
George Sisler
Billy Southworth
Warren Spahn
Casey Stengel
Ed Walsh

Lloyd Waner
Paul Waner
Deacon White
Vic Willis *
George Wright *
Harry Wright
Cy Young

- Players and managers listed in **bold** are depicted on their Hall of Fame plaques wearing a Braves cap insignia.
- * Boston Braves listed as primary team according to the Hall of Fame

=== Boston Braves Hall of Fame ===
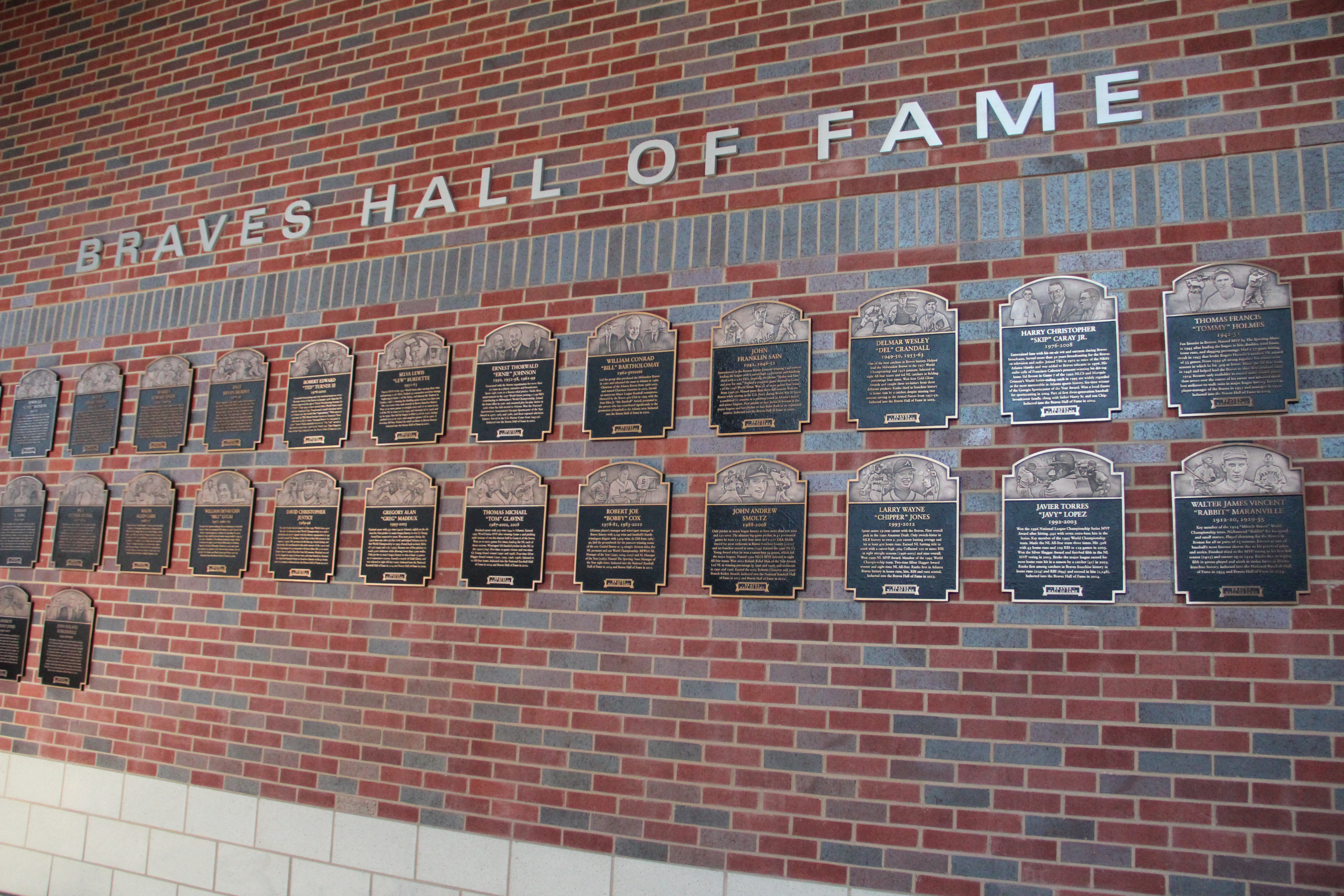
Braves Hall of Fame wall at Truist Park

Key
Year	Year inducted
**Bold**	Member of the Baseball Hall of Fame
†	Member of the Baseball Hall of Fame as a Boston Brave

**Braves Hall of Fame**
Year	No.	Name	Position(s)	Tenure
1999	21	**Warren Spahn**	P	1942, 1946–1952
1999	41	**Eddie Mathews**	3B	1952
2001	32	Ernie Johnson Sr.	P	1950, 1952
2002	28, 33	Johnny Sain	P	1942, 1946–1951
2003	1, 23	Del Crandall	C	1949–1952
2004	—	**Kid Nichols**^{†}	P	1890–1901
2004	1	Tommy Holmes	OF; Manager	1942–1951; 1951–1952
2005	—	Herman Long	SS	1890–1902
2014	1	**Rabbit Maranville**^{†}	SS/2B	1912–1920; 1929–1933, 1935
2019	—	**Hugh Duffy**	OF	1892–1900
2023	—	Fred Tenney	1B	1894–1907, 1911

== See also ==
- History of the Atlanta Braves
- List of Atlanta Braves seasons
