= Arthur Soden =

Major League Baseball owner

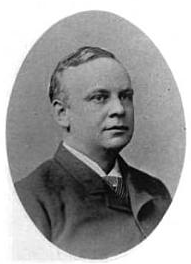
- Soden in the 1880s
- Born: April 23, 1843; Framingham, Massachusetts, U.S.
- Died: August 13, 1925 (aged 82); Sunapee, New Hampshire, U.S.
- Occupations: Owner of the Boston Base Ball Club (1887–1906); President of the National League (1882)
- Awards: 5× National League champions (1891, 1892, 1893, 1897, 1898); Pre-modern World Series champions: (Note: See World Series#The original World Series for information about pre-1903 World Series.) 1892; Honor Rolls of Baseball

Arthur H. Soden (April 23, 1843 – August 13, 1925) was an American executive in Major League Baseball who was the president/owner of the Boston Base Ball Club of the National League (Note: The franchise was known by several nicknames before becoming the Braves in 1912; the franchise moved to become the Milwaukee Braves in 1953 and again relocated in 1966 to become the Atlanta Braves.) during the 1887–1906 seasons, president of the National League in 1882, and a Civil War veteran.

== Early life ==
Soden was born on April 23, 1843, in Framingham, Massachusetts. Soden served as a hospital steward with the 22nd Massachusetts Volunteer Infantry during the Civil War. After the war, Soden was an amateur baseball player of note. In 1874, he was part of the Boston club during their tour of England. He played center field in a game at the Kennington Oval.

== Baseball ==
In 1876, Soden bought into the Boston Base Ball Club. He and J. B. Billings later purchased controlling interest in the club and Soden became the team's president in 1877.

Soden is credited with inventing the baseball reserve clause—in 1880, standard player contracts began including a clause stating that the club could reserve the player for the following season; teams could reserve up to five players. In 1883, the number was increased to 11, which was a typical roster size in that era, and soon teams were allowed unlimited reserves.

In 1882, Soden served briefly as president of the National League (NL) following the death of William Hulbert. When the rival American Association was preparing to expand to eight teams for the 1883 season, Soden acted to add NL teams in New York City and Philadelphia (both cities had been kicked out of the league by Hulbert after the inaugural 1876 season), replacing the Troy Trojans and Worcester Ruby Legs, the bottom two teams in the league. Although Troy and Worcester objected to their removal, their attendance problems—drawing only 6 and 18 spectators in their final two games against one another—sealed their fate.

Soden played a major role in the war between the NL and the Players' League in 1890, bankrolling several teams in the league as attendance dropped; by the time the NL emerged triumphant, Soden owned a majority of the New York Giants in addition to his control of the Boston franchise.

Boston won five pennants between 1891 and 1898. After losing the pennant to Baltimore in 1894 and 1895, a struggling start in 1896 led Soden to observe that his players' on-field arguments were having a negative effect, and stated that any players fined for abusing umpires would now pay their own fines rather than have the team cover the cost secretly; Boston went on a 22–2 run over the next few weeks, and briefly took over first place, but finished behind Baltimore (for the last time) that season.

Soden was known for being stingy, and catcher Boileryard Clarke observed after coming to the Beaneaters from Baltimore in 1899 that the team owner was also amazingly distant. Clarke later insisted that although he played for Boston for two years, Soden never knew he was on the team. After the American League emerged as a rival in the 20th century, many players began deserting the NL for the new league, and Boston suffered the heaviest casualties.

== Personal life ==
Outside of baseball, Soden ran a successful roofing business with his son, Charles. He resided in West Newton, Massachusetts.

In 1909, Soden was sued by Frederick L. Small, a Boston-based stockbroker, for $500,000 ($17.5 million in 2024). Soden was accused of having "alienated the affections" of Small's wife. In 1911, Soden was ordered to pay Small a judgment of $10,000 ($337,464 in 2024).

Soden died at his summer home in Sunapee, New Hampshire, on August 13, 1925.

== Sources ==
- Nemec, David (1997), The Great Encyclopedia of 19th-Century Major League Baseball, Penguin.
- John L. Parker (1887), "Henry Wilson's Regiment: History of the Twenty-Second Massachusetts Infantry".

Preceded by William Hulbert	National League president 1882	Succeeded by Abraham Mills
