= Atlanta Braves all-time roster =

List of baseball players

The Atlanta Braves are a National League ballclub (1966–present) previously located in Milwaukee 1953–1965 (Milwaukee Braves) and in Boston 1871–1952. The Boston teams are sometimes called Boston Red Stockings 1871–1876, Boston Red Caps 1876–1882, Boston Beaneaters 1883–1906, Boston Doves 1907–1910, Boston Rustlers 1911, Boston Braves 1912–1935, Boston Bees 1936–1940, Boston Braves 1941–1952. Here is a list of all their players in regular season games beginning 1871.

Bold identifies members of the National Baseball Hall of Fame.

Italics identify players with uniform numbers retired by the team (Atlanta).

== A ==
- David Aardsma
- Hank Aaron
- Tommie Aaron
- Ed Abbaticchio
- Kurt Abbott
- Ted Abernathy
- Jim Acker
- Manny Acosta
- Ronald Acuña Jr.
- Lane Adams
- Matt Adams
- Joe Adcock
- Bob Addis
- Bob Addy
- Morrie Aderholt
- Ehire Adrianza
- Jack Aker
- Bill Akers
- Ozzie Albies
- Jay Aldrich
- Cory Aldridge
- Doyle Alexander
- Antonio Alfonseca
- Kolby Allard
- Bob Allen
- Frank Allen
- Myron Allen
- Nick Allen
- Armando Almanza
- Abraham Almonte
- Sandy Alomar Sr.
- Felipe Alou
- Dario Alvarez
- Jose Alvarez
- Nacho Alvarez Jr.
- Bill Anderson
- Brian Anderson
- Garret Anderson
- Ian Anderson
- Josh Anderson
- Nick Anderson
- Nate Andrews
- Rick Ankiel
- Johnny Antonelli
- Orlando Arcia
- José Ascanio
- Jairo Asencio
- Andy Ashby
- Ken Aspromonte
- Bob Aspromonte
- Brian Asselstine
- Paul Assenmacher
- Tom Asmussen
- Toby Atwell
- Harry Aubrey
- Al Autry
- Chick Autry
- Earl Averill
- Steve Avery
- Bobby Ávila
- Luis Avilán
- Luis Ayala
- Willy Aybar
- Joe Ayrault
- José Azócar

== B ==
- Johnny Babich
- Danys Báez
- Bill Bagwell
- Ed Bailey
- Fred Bailey
- Gene Bailey
- Harvey Bailey
- Dusty Baker
- Jeff Baker
- Paul Bako
- Mike Balas
- Drake Baldwin
- Lee Bales
- Jim Ball
- Dave Bancroft
- Jimmy Bannon
- Rylan Bannon
- Walter Barbare
- Steve Barber
- Frank Barberich
- George Barclay
- Len Barker
- Jesse Barnes
- Ross Barnes
- Virgil Barnes
- George Barnicle
- Dick Barrett
- Frank Barrett
- Johnny Barrett
- Marty Barrett
- Red Barrett
- Red Barron
- Frank Barrows
- Kevin Barry
- Shad Barry
- Joey Bart
- Brian Barton
- Doc Bass
- Joe Batchelder
- Johnny Bates
- Miguel Batista
- Howard Battle
- Danny Bautista
- José Bautista
- Bob Beall
- Tommy Beals
- Brandon Beachy
- Mike Beard
- Pedro Beato
- Jim Beauchamp
- Ginger Beaumont
- Johnny Beazley
- Fred Beck
- Beals Becker
- Gordon Beckham
- Howie Bedell
- Steve Bedrosian
- Rick Behenna
- Stan Belinda
- Gus Bell
- Les Bell
- Mike Bell
- Terry Bell
- Rafael Belliard
- Rob Belloir
- Bruce Benedict
- Ray Benge
- Charlie Bennett
- Jeff Bennett
- Larry Benton
- Juan Berenguer
- Marty Bergen
- Wally Berger
- John Bergh
- Sean Bergman
- Adam Bernero
- Ray Berres
- Gerónimo Berroa
- Damon Berryhill
- Wilson Betemit
- Christian Bethancourt
- Huck Betts
- Vern Bickford
- Jesse Biddle
- Osvaldo Bido
- Mike Bielecki
- Cavan Biggio
- Ethan Blackaby
- Earl Blackburn
- Lena Blackburne
- Aaron Blair
- Johnny Blanchard
- Al Blanche
- Gregor Blanco
- Henry Blanco
- Kevin Blankenship
- Larvell Blanks
- Wade Blasingame
- Jeff Blauser
- Jerry Blevins
- Scott Blewett
- Terry Blocker
- Tony Boeckel
- Joe Boever
- Ray Boggs
- Tommy Boggs
- Frank Bolling
- Tommy Bond
- Jung Bong
- Emilio Bonifacio
- Bobby Bonilla
- Barry Bonnell
- Frank Bonner
- Al Bool
- Bret Boone
- Ray Boone
- Pedro Borbón Jr.
- Joe Borden
- Joe Borowski
- J. C. Boscán
- Jake Boultes
- Peter Bourjos
- Michael Bourn
- Jim Bouton
- Frank Bowerman
- Micah Bowie
- Blaine Boyer
- Clete Boyer
- Buzz Boyle
- Brad Brach
- Silvino Bracho
- Larry Bradford
- Foghorn Bradley
- Jed Bradley
- Bill Brady
- Bob Brady
- King Brady
- Darren Bragg
- Dave Brain
- Ed Brandt
- Kitty Bransfield
- John Braun
- Garland Braxton
- Buster Bray
- Sid Bream
- Jim Breazeale
- John Brebbia
- Jake Brigham
- Reid Brignac
- Tony Brizzolara
- Chris Brock
- Steve Brodie
- Rico Brogna
- Frank Brooks
- Sig Broskie
- Rex Brothers
- Dan Brouthers
- Jim Brower
- Bob Brown
- Buster Brown
- Drummond Brown
- Eddie Brown
- Fred Brown
- Jarvis Brown
- Lew Brown
- Oscar Brown
- Sam Brown
- Tom Brown
- Bill Brubaker
- Bob Bruce
- Vidal Bruján
- George Brunet
- Bob Brush
- Bill Bruton
- Tod Brynan
- Ryan Buchter
- Francisley Bueno
- Art Bues
- Charlie Buffinton
- Bob Buhl
- Aaron Bummer
- Danny Burawa
- Lew Burdette
- Jack Burdock
- Joe Burg
- Billy Burke
- Dan Burke
- Frank Burke
- John Burkett
- Blake Burkhalter
- Joe Burns
- Paul Burris
- Jeff Burroughs
- Dick Burrus
- Guy Bush
- Adam Butler
- Art Butler
- Brett Butler
- Cecil Butler
- Paul Byrd

== C ==
- Francisco Cabrera
- José Cabrera
- Melky Cabrera
- Trevor Cahill
- Sam Calderone
- Bill Calhoun
- Joe Callahan
- Alberto Callaspo
- Jaír Camargo
- Johan Camargo
- Hank Camelli
- Jack Cameron
- Ken Caminiti
- Rick Camp
- Dave Campbell
- Vin Campbell
- Jorge Campillo
- Hugh Canavan
- Bárbaro Cañizares
- Rip Cannell
- Robinson Canó
- Ben Cantwell
- José Capellán
- Buzz Capra
- Pat Capri
- Ramón Caraballo
- Ben Cardoni
- Don Cardwell
- Shane Carle
- Buddy Carlyle
- Eddie Carnett
- Pat Carney
- David Carpenter (b. 1985)
- David Carpenter (b. 1987)
- Carlos Carrasco
- Clay Carroll
- Cliff Carroll
- Dixie Carroll
- Rico Carty
- Chuck Cary
- Paul Casanova
- Vinny Castilla
- Tony Castillo
- Mike Cather
- Ted Cather
- Red Causey
- Wayne Causey
- Orlando Cepeda
- Rick Cerone
- Hunter Cervenka
- Francisco Cervelli
- Jhoulys Chacín
- Chet Chadbourne
- Rome Chambers
- Chris Chambliss
- Darrel Chaney
- Tiny Chaplin
- Larry Chappell
- Bill Chappelle
- Norm Charlton
- Jesse Chavez
- Buster Chatham
- Dave Cheadle
- Bruce Chen
- Larry Cheney
- Matt Childers
- Bob Chipman
- Yonny Chirinos
- Neil Chrisley
- Lloyd Christenbury
- Ryan Church
- Gino Cimoli
- Pedro Ciriaco
- Jim Clancy
- Earl Clark
- Glen Clark
- Terry Clark
- Boileryard Clarke
- Josh Clarke
- Bill Clarkson
- Buzz Clarkson
- Dad Clarkson
- John Clarkson
- Marty Clary
- Chet Clemens
- Jack Clements
- Brent Clevlen
- Ty Cline
- Tony Cloninger
- Brad Clontz
- Al Closter
- Otis Clymer
- Gene Cocreham
- Jack Coffey
- Kevin Coffman
- Ed Cogswell
- Greg Colbrunn
- Dave Cole
- Dick Cole
- Bill Collins
- Don Collins
- Jimmy Collins
- Pat Collins
- Wilson Collins
- Zip Collins
- Josh Collmenter
- Bill Collver
- Bartolo Colón
- Román Colón
- Steve Colyer
- Pete Compton
- Clint Conatser
- Gene Conley
- Jocko Conlon
- Frank Connaughton
- Joe Connolly
- Joe Connor
- John Connor
- Brooks Conrad
- Jim Constable
- José Constanza
- William Contreras
- Dick Conway
- Rip Conway
- Duff Cooley
- Bill Cooney
- Jimmy Cooney
- Johnny Cooney
- Gary Cooper
- Mort Cooper
- Walker Cooper
- Lance Cormier
- John Cornely
- Vic Correll
- David Cortés
- Joe Coscarart
- Chuck Cottier
- Ensign Cottrell
- Ernie Courtney
- Dee Cousineau
- Sam Covington
- Wes Covington
- Billy Cowan
- Joe Cowley
- Austin Cox
- Bill Coyle
- Charlie Cozart
- Del Crandall
- Doc Crandall
- Connie Creeden
- Fred Crolius
- Ray Crone
- Bill Cronin
- George Crowe
- Bill Crowley
- Terry Crowley
- Walton Cruise
- Cal Crum
- Dick Crutcher
- Jesús Cruz
- Juan Cruz
- Tony Cuccinello
- Charlie Culberson
- Dick Culler
- Jack Cummings
- Will Cunnane
- Brandon Cunniff
- Bill Cunningham
- Bruce Cunningham
- Todd Cunningham
- George Cuppy
- Sammy Curran
- Cliff Curtis
- Jack Curtis
- Jack Cusick

== D ==
- John Dagenhard
- Bill Dahlen
- Babe Dahlgren
- Con Daily
- Bruce Dal Canton
- Bill Daley
- Joe Daly
- Bill Dam
- Davis Daniel
- Jack Daniels
- Alvin Dark
- Mike Davey
- Ted Davidson
- Tucker Davidson
- Kyle Davies
- Daisy Davis
- George Davis
- Jody Davis
- Mark Davis
- Trench Davis
- Joey Dawley
- Ken Dayley
- Grant Dayton
- Mike de la Hoz
- Chase d'Arnaud
- Travis d'Arnaud
- Bryan De La Cruz
- Enyel De Los Santos
- Charlie Deal
- Pat Dealy
- Pat Deasley
- Jeff Dedmon
- Jim Delahanty
- Art Delaney
- Randall Delgado
- Al Demaree
- Frank Demaree
- John DeMerit
- Travis Demeritte
- Gene DeMontreville
- Drew Denson
- Mark DeRosa
- Matt DeSalvo
- Rube Dessau
- Elmer Dessens
- Ducky Detweiler
- Mike Devereaux
- Adrian Devine
- Joey Devine
- Art Devlin
- Rex DeVogt
- Josh Devore
- Blake DeWitt
- Charlie Dexter
- Alexis Díaz
- Carlos Diaz
- Matt Diaz
- Alex Dickerson
- R. A. Dickey
- Walt Dickson
- Bob Didier
- Ernie Diehl
- George Diehl
- Dick Dietz
- Steve Dignan
- Don Dillard
- Vince DiMaggio
- Bill Dinneen
- Jack Dittmer
- Pat Dobson
- Dylan Dodd
- Cozy Dolan
- Art Doll
- Josh Donaldson
- Mike Donlin
- Blix Donnelly
- Ed Donnelly
- Bill Donovan
- Dick Donovan
- Patsy Donovan
- Gus Dorner
- Octavio Dotel
- Paul Doyle
- Moe Drabowsky
- Bill Dreesen
- Bob Dresser
- J. D. Drew
- Tim Drew
- Frank Drews
- Mauricio Dubón
- Lucas Duda
- John Dudra
- Hugh Duffy
- Joe Dugan
- Oscar Dugey
- Bill Dunlap
- Mike Dunn
- Dane Dunning
- Parker Dunshee
- Chad Durbin
- Adam Duvall
- Jermaine Dye

== E ==
- Tom Earley
- Mal Eason
- Jamie Easterly
- Gary Eave
- Eddie Eayrs
- Derrin Ebert
- Ox Eckhardt
- John Edelman
- Mike Eden
- Brian Edmondson
- Foster Edwards
- Carl Edwards Jr.
- Dick Egan
- Juan Eichelberger
- Mark Eichhorn
- Dave Eilers
- Bryce Elder
- Seth Elledge
- Bob Elliott
- Glenn Elliott
- Jumbo Elliott
- Rowdy Elliott
- Alan Embree
- Bob Emmerich
- Gil English
- John Ennis
- Robbie Erlin
- Dick Errickson
- Nick Esasky
- Yunel Escobar
- George Estock
- Johnny Estrada
- Buck Etchison
- Chick Evans
- Darrell Evans
- Johnny Evers

== F ==
- Jorge Fábregas
- Stuart Fairchild
- Pete Falcone
- Ed Fallenstein
- Bailey Falter
- Kyle Farmer
- Kyle Farnsworth
- Doc Farrell
- Kerby Farrell
- Erick Fedde
- Gus Felix
- George Ferguson
- Nanny Fernandez
- Wes Ferrell
- Lou Fette
- Robert Fick
- Dana Fillingim
- Hank Fischer
- Mike Fischlin
- Tom Fisher
- Charlie Fitzberger
- Ed Fitzpatrick
- Jay Flaa
- Patsy Flaherty
- Ryan Flaherty
- David Fletcher
- Elbie Fletcher
- Tyler Flowers
- Curry Foley
- Mike Foltynewicz
- Bill Ford
- Gene Ford
- Hod Ford
- Mike Ford
- Wenty Ford
- Terry Forster
- John Foster
- Leo Foster
- Jack Fournier
- Chad Fox
- John Fox
- Terry Fox
- Jake Fraley
- Juan Francisco
- Julio Franco
- Matt Franco
- Jeff Francoeur
- Tito Francona
- Fred Frankhouse
- Wayne Franklin
- Chick Fraser
- Vic Frazier
- Buck Freeman
- Freddie Freeman
- Jimmy Freeman
- Marvin Freeman
- Sam Freeman
- Howard Freigau
- David Freitas
- Pepe Frías
- Max Fried
- Charlie Frisbee
- Danny Frisella
- Sam Frock
- Didier Fuentes
- John Fuller
- Frank Funk
- Rafael Furcal

== G ==
- Frank Gabler
- Len Gabrielson
- Andrés Galarraga
- Dave Gallagher
- Gil Gallagher
- Ron Gant
- Charlie Ganzel
- Gene Garber
- Adonis García
- Dámaso García
- Freddy García
- Jaime García
- Jesse Garcia
- Debs Garms
- Ralph Garr
- Adrian Garrett
- Gil Garrido
- Jim Garry
- Cito Gaston
- Hank Gastright
- Aubrey Gatewood
- Evan Gattis
- Kevin Gausman
- Doc Gautreau
- Dinty Gearin
- Cory Gearrin
- Phil Geier
- Gary Geiger
- Joe Genewich
- Sam Gentile
- Gary Gentry
- Lefty George
- Ben Geraghty
- Lefty Gervais
- Gus Getz
- Charlie Getzien
- Frank Gibson
- Bob Giggie
- Larry Gilbert
- Rod Gilbreath
- Marcus Giles
- Bernard Gilkey
- Carden Gillenwater
- Billy Ging
- Ed Giovanola
- Roland Gladu
- Troy Glaus
- Tom Glavine
- Ed Glenn
- Al Glossop
- Chuck Goggin
- Luiz Gohara
- Hal Goldsmith
- Luis Gómez
- Jesse Gonder
- Álex González
- Mike González (C)
- Mike González (P)
- Tony González
- Gene Good
- Ralph Good
- Wilbur Good
- Ed Goodson
- Sid Gordon
- Reid Gorecki
- Charlie Gorin
- Phil Gosselin
- Rubén Gotay
- Hank Gowdy
- Tony Graffanino
- Peaches Graham
- Skinny Graham
- Mark Grant
- Sid Graves
- Nick Green
- Shane Greene
- Tommy Greene
- Kent Greenfield
- Tommy Gregg
- Seth Greisinger
- Ed Gremminger
- Buddy Gremp
- Ken Griffey Sr.
- Hank Griffin
- Tommy Griffith
- Burleigh Grimes
- Marquis Grissom
- Vaughn Grissom
- George Grosart
- Robbie Grossman
- Kevin Gryboski
- Ozzie Guillén
- Luis Guillorme
- Skip Guinn
- Tom Gunning
- Dick Gyselman

== H ==
- Eddie Haas
- Mert Hackett
- Walter Hackett
- Mickey Haefner
- Hal Haid
- Dad Hale
- Albert Hall
- Bob Hall
- Jimmie Hall
- Cole Hamels
- Billy Hamilton (19th-century)
- Billy Hamilton (21st-century)
- Ian Hamilton
- Chris Hammond
- Mike Hampton
- Brad Hand
- Harry Hanebrink
- Preston Hanna
- Jack Hannifin
- Tommy Hanson
- Lou Hardie
- Jim Hardin
- Steve Hargan
- Pinky Hargrave
- Dick Harley
- George Harper
- Terry Harper
- Joe Harrington
- Dave Harris
- Hayden Harris
- Willie Harris
- Michael Harris II
- Roric Harrison
- Dean Hartgraves
- Mickey Haslin
- Buddy Hassett
- Tom Hausman
- Bill Hawes
- Marvin Hawley
- Bob Hazle
- Bunny Hearn (1910s P)
- Bunny Hearn (1920s P)
- Taylor Hearn
- Jeff Heath
- Mike Heath
- Adeiny Hechavarria
- Danny Heep
- Jonah Heim
- Ben Heller
- Wes Helms
- Heinie Heltzel
- Ken Henderson
- Bob Hendley
- Don Hendrickson
- Dwayne Henry
- John Henry
- Snake Henry
- Ron Herbel
- Guillermo Heredia
- Jimmy Herget
- Kevin Herget
- Billy Herman
- Al Hermann
- Remy Hermoso
- Daysbel Hernández
- Diory Hernández
- Elieser Hernández
- José Hernández
- Liván Hernández
- Ramón Hernández
- Roberto Hernández
- John Herrnstein
- Earl Hersh
- Frank Hershey
- Buck Herzog
- Joe Hesketh
- Otto Hess
- Mike Hessman
- Joe Heving
- Jason Heyward
- Jim Hickey
- Mike Hickey
- Brewer Hicklen
- Charlie Hickman
- Brandon Hicks
- Bill Higgins
- Andy High
- Garry Hill
- Milt Hill
- Oliver Hill
- Sam Hilliard
- Mike Hines
- Paul Hines
- Eric Hinske
- John Hinton
- Herb Hippauf
- Jim Hitchcock
- Trey Hodges
- Ralph Hodgin
- George Hodson
- Billy Hoeft
- Joe Hoerner
- Stew Hofferth
- Izzy Hoffman
- Shanty Hogan
- Brad Hogg
- Bobby Hogue
- Ray Holbert
- Walter Holke
- Dutch Holland
- Todd Hollandsworth
- Bonnie Hollingsworth
- Damon Hollins
- Darren Holmes
- Grant Holmes
- Tommy Holmes
- Abie Hood
- Dick Hoover
- Johnny Hopp
- Bob Horner
- Rogers Hornsby
- Joe Hornung
- Pete Hotaling
- Sadie Houck
- Tom House
- Ben Houser
- Tyler Houston
- Del Howard
- Larry Howard
- Jay Howell
- Al Hrabosky
- Walt Hriniak
- Glenn Hubbard
- Mike Hubbard
- Trenidad Hubbard
- Otto Huber
- John Hudek
- Tim Hudson
- Tom Hughes
- Harry Hulihan
- Bill Hunnefield
- Brian Hunter
- Jerry Hurley
- Jason Hursh
- Warren Huston
- Johnny Hutchings
- Ira Hutchinson

== I ==
- Raisel Iglesias
- Ender Inciarte
- Alexis Infante
- Omar Infante
- Scotty Ingerton

== J ==
- Fred Jacklitsch
- Alex Jackson
- George Jackson
- Jay Jackson
- Luke Jackson
- Sonny Jackson
- Brook Jacoby
- Bernie James
- Bill James
- Chuck James
- Dion James
- Paul Janish
- Kenley Jansen
- Jim Jarvis
- Pat Jarvis
- Larry Jaster
- Al Javery
- Joey Jay
- George Jeffcoat
- Virgil Jester
- Sam Jethroe
- Germán Jiménez
- Joe Jiménez
- Art Johnson
- Bob Johnson (IF)
- Bob Johnson (P)
- Chris Johnson
- Davey Johnson
- Deron Johnson
- Ernie Johnson
- Jim Johnson
- Joe Johnson
- Kelly Johnson
- Ken Johnson
- Lou Johnson
- Micah Johnson
- Pierce Johnson
- Randy Johnson
- Reed Johnson
- Roy Johnson
- Si Johnson
- Dick Johnston
- Jimmy Johnston
- Dave Jolly
- Andruw Jones
- Bill Jones
- Brandon Jones
- Charley Jones
- Chipper Jones
- Johnny Jones
- Ken Jones
- Mack Jones
- Nate Jones
- Nippy Jones
- Percy Jones
- Sheldon Jones
- Eddie Joost
- Brian Jordan
- Buck Jordan
- Mike Jorgensen
- Matt Joyce
- Wally Joyner
- Jorge Julio
- Jair Jurrjens
- David Justice

== K ==
- Bob Kahle
- Al Kaiser
- Owen Kahn
- Scott Kamieniecki
- Ike Kamp
- Tom Kane
- James Karinchak
- Andy Karl
- Steve Karsay
- Kenshin Kawakami
- Sean Kazmar Jr.
- Ray Keating
- DaShawn Keirsey Jr.
- Bill Keister
- Jarred Kelenic
- John Kelleher
- Dick Kelley
- Joe Kelley
- Tom Kelley
- Jim Kelly
- Joe Kelly
- King Kelly
- Mike Kelly
- Roberto Kelly
- Matt Kemp
- Art Kenney
- Marty Keough
- Charlie Kerfeld
- Buddy Kerr
- Ray Kerr
- Rick Kester
- Dallas Keuchel
- Hod Kibbie
- John Kiley
- Frank Killen
- Ha-seong Kim
- Craig Kimbrel
- Hal King
- Ray King
- Tyler Kinley
- Jay Kirke
- Malachi Kittridge
- Billy Klaus
- Ryan Klesko
- Lou Klimchock
- Ron Kline
- Steve Kline
- Johnny Kling
- Fred Klobedanz
- Stan Klopp
- Billy Klusman
- Clyde Kluttz
- Elmer Knetzer
- Jack Knight
- Fritz Knothe
- Joe Knotts
- Danny Kolb
- Gary Kolb
- Brad Komminsk
- Ed Konetchy
- Jim Konstanty
- George Kopacz
- Larry Kopf
- Joe Koppe
- Dave Koslo
- Casey Kotchman
- Mark Kotsay
- Fabian Kowalik
- Brian Kowitz
- Clarence Kraft
- Lew Krausse Jr.
- Jimmy Kremers
- Rube Kroh
- Ian Krol
- Mike Krsnich
- Art Kruger
- Steve Kuczek
- Charlie Kuhns

== L ==
- Frank LaCorte
- Lee Lacy
- Hi Ladd
- Gerald Laird
- Fred Lake
- Al Lakeman
- Frank LaManna
- Henry Lampe
- Hunter Lane
- Walt Lanfranconi
- Ryan Langerhans
- Johnny Lanning
- Gene Lansing
- Norm Larker
- Adam LaRoche
- Swede Larsen
- Tony La Russa
- Frank Lary
- Charley Lau
- Ramón Laureano
- Bill Lauterborn
- Alfred Lawson
- Bob Lawson
- Freddy Leach
- Jack Leary
- Wilfredo Ledezma
- Bill Lee
- Derrek Lee
- Dylan Lee
- Hal Lee
- Wade Lefler
- Lou Legett
- Charlie Leibrandt
- Denny Lemaster
- Mark Lemke
- Max León
- Sandy León
- Andy Leonard
- Anthony Lerew
- John LeRoy
- Dixie Leverett
- Bill Lewis
- Fred Lewis
- Ted Lewis
- Don Liddle
- Fred Liese
- Kerry Ligtenberg
- Brent Lillibridge
- Derek Lilliquist
- Rufino Linares
- Vive Lindaman
- Ernie Lindemann
- Walt Linden
- Carl Lindquist
- Scott Linebrink
- Dick Littlefield
- Danny Litwhiler
- Mickey Livingston
- Bob Loane
- Keith Lockhart
- Kenny Lofton
- Bob Logan
- Boone Logan
- Johnny Logan
- George Lombard
- Ernie Lombardi
- Herman Long (baseball)
- Al López
- Albie Lopez
- Javy López
- Nicky Lopez
- Reynaldo López
- Bris Lord
- Tom Lovett
- Fletcher Low
- Bobby Lowe
- Derek Lowe
- Red Lucas
- Jonathan Lucroy
- Rick Luecken
- Lucas Luetge
- Julio Lugo
- Mike Lum
- Fernando Lunar
- Dolf Luque
- Billy Lush
- Al Lyons
- Steve Lyons

== M ==
- Danny MacFayden
- Mike Macha
- Joe Mack
- Ken MacKenzie
- Max Macon
- Harry MacPherson
- Kid Madden
- Tommy Madden
- Jerry Maddox
- Greg Maddux
- Sherry Magee
- Harl Maggert
- Freddie Maguire
- Ron Mahay
- Tyler Mahle
- Mickey Mahler
- Rick Mahler
- Paul Maholm
- Mike Mahoney
- Willard Mains
- Hank Majeski
- John Malarkey
- Bobby Malkmus
- Les Mallon
- Marty Malloy
- Charlie Maloney
- Leo Mangum
- Kelly Mann
- Les Mann
- Jack Manning
- Jim Manning
- Don Manno
- Félix Mantilla
- Dick Manville
- Paul Marak
- Rabbit Maranville
- Nick Markakis
- Rube Marquard
- Luis Márquez
- Jason Marquis
- Eli Marrero
- William Marriott
- Doc Marshall
- Mike Marshall
- Willard Marshall
- Andy Marte
- Doc Martel
- Billy Martin (2B)
- Billy Martin (SS)
- Chris Martin
- Jack Martin
- Ray Martin
- Tom Martin
- Cristhian Martínez
- Dave Martinez
- Dennis Martínez
- J. P. Martínez
- Marty Martínez
- Pablo Martínez
- Phil Masi
- Mike Massey
- Red Massey
- Jorge Mateo
- Joe Mather
- Joe Mathes
- Bobby Mathews
- Eddie Mathews
- Jeff Mathis
- Pascual Matos
- Al Mattern
- Gary Matthews
- Joe Matthews
- Rick Matula
- Tyler Matzek
- Gene Mauch
- Larry Maxie
- Darrell May
- Dave May
- Cameron Maybin
- Lee Maye
- Eddie Mayo
- Bill McAfee
- Gene McAuliffe
- Dick McBride
- Macay McBride
- Brian McCann
- Bill McCarthy (C)
- Bill McCarthy (P)
- Brandon McCarthy
- Johnny McCarthy
- Tom McCarthy
- Tommy McCarthy
- Jeff McCleskey
- Jim McCloskey
- Hal McClure
- Sam McConnell
- Frank McCormick
- Mike McCormick
- Adam McCreery
- Tom McCreery
- Ed McDonald
- Tex McDonald
- Oddibe McDowell
- Frank McElyea
- Dan McGann
- Chippy McGarr
- Dan McGee
- Tim McGinley
- Kevin McGlinchy
- Beauty McGowan
- Fred McGriff
- Collin McHugh
- Stuffy McInnis
- Bill McKechnie
- Denny McLain
- Bo McLaughlin
- Joey McLaughlin
- Ralph McLeod
- Nate McLouth
- Don McMahon
- Marty McManus
- Greg McMichael
- Roy McMillan
- Craig McMurtry
- Dinny McNamara
- Tim McNamara
- Ed McNichol
- Mike McQueen
- Hugh McQuillan
- Bill McTigue
- Larry McWilliams
- Víctor Mederos
- Kris Medlen
- Joe Medwick
- Jouett Meekin
- Mark Melancon
- Denis Menke
- Kent Mercker
- Whit Merrifield
- Bill Merritt
- Andy Messersmith
- Catfish Metkovich
- Dan Meyer
- Chief Meyers
- Félix Millán
- Corky Miller
- Doc Miller
- Eddie Miller (IF)
- Eddie Miller (OF)
- Frank Miller
- Norm Miller
- Stu Miller
- Tom Miller
- Art Mills
- Kevin Millwood
- Tommy Milone
- Mike Minor
- A. J. Minter
- Fred Mitchell
- Keith Mitchell
- John Mizerock
- George Mogridge
- Anthony Molina
- Gabe Molina
- Raúl Mondesí
- Willie Montañez
- John Montefusco
- Rafael Montero
- Al Montgomery
- Donnie Moore
- Eddie Moore
- Gene Moore
- Junior Moore
- Randy Moore
- Trey Moore
- Herbie Moran
- Hiker Moran
- Pat Moran
- Mike Mordecai
- Forrest More
- Seth Morehead
- Omar Moreno
- Roger Moret
- Cy Morgan
- Joe Morgan
- Ed Moriarty
- Gene Moriarty
- Jim Moroney
- John Morrill
- Akeel Morris
- Guy Morrison
- Jim Morrison
- Bubba Morton
- Carl Morton
- Charlie Morton
- Damian Moss
- Ray Moss
- Darryl Motley
- Jason Motte
- Joe Mowry
- Peter Moylan
- Heinie Mueller
- Ray Mueller
- Joe Muich
- Terry Mulholland
- Kyle Muller
- Dick Mulligan
- Rolddy Muñoz
- Red Murff
- Tim Murnane
- Buzz Murphy
- Dale Murphy
- Dave Murphy
- Frank Murphy
- John Ryan Murphy
- Owen Murphy
- Sean Murphy
- Amby Murray
- Jim Murray
- Matt Murray
- Ivan Murrell
- Danny Murtaugh
- Greg Myers
- Hap Myers

== N ==
- Bill Nahorodny
- Billy Nash
- Jim Nash
- Julio Navarro
- Denny Neagle
- Tom Needham
- Art Nehf
- Gary Neibauer
- Tommy Neill
- Bernie Neis
- Joe Nelson
- Tommy Nelson
- Héctor Neris
- Graig Nettles
- Johnny Neun
- Sean Newcomb
- Chet Nichols Jr.
- Kid Nichols
- Rod Nichols
- Tricky Nichols
- Dave Nicholson
- Fred Nicholson
- David Nied
- Joe Niekro
- Phil Niekro
- Butch Nieman
- Melvin Nieves
- Johnny Niggeling
- C. J. Nitkowski
- Al Nixon
- Otis Nixon
- Joe Nolan
- Lou North
- Jake Northrop
- Greg Norton
- Don Nottebart
- Win Noyes
- Vladimir Núñez
- Dizzy Nutter
- Charlie Nyce

== O ==
- Charlie O'Brien
- Johnny O'Brien
- Danny O'Connell
- Darren O'Day
- Ken O'Dea
- Billy O'Dell
- Eric O'Flaherty
- Kid O'Hara
- Dan O'Leary
- Randy O'Neal
- Mickey O'Neil
- Jack O'Neill
- Frank O'Rourke
- Jim O'Rourke
- John O'Rourke
- Tom O'Rourke
- Johnny Oates
- Ken Oberkfell
- Blue Moon Odom
- Dave Odom
- Jake Odorizzi
- Joe Oeschger
- Rowland Office
- Joe Ogrodowski
- Will Ohman
- José Oliva
- Gene Oliver
- Hector Olivera
- Chi-Chi Olivo
- Luis Rodríguez Olmo
- Greg Olson
- Gregg Olson
- Matt Olson
- Ed Olwine
- Jess Orndorff
- Jonathan Ornelas
- Pete Orr
- Rafael Ortega
- Russ Ortiz
- Wayne Osborne
- Dan Osinski
- Jimmy Outlaw
- Lyle Overbay
- Larry Owen
- Marcell Ozuna

== P ==
- Cristian Pache
- Tom Paciorek
- Don Padgett
- Ernie Padgett
- Andy Pafko
- Mike Page
- Phil Paine
- David Palmer
- Emilio Palmero
- Jim Panther
- Milt Pappas
- Chad Paronto
- James Parr
- Jeff Parrett
- Jiggs Parson
- Charlie Parsons
- Wes Parsons
- Tyler Pastornicky
- Gene Patton
- Joel Payamps
- Mike Payne
- Bill Pecota
- Joc Pederson
- Red Peery
- Alejandro Peña
- Brayan Peña
- Ramón Peña
- Tony Peña Jr.
- Jim Pendleton
- Terry Pendleton
- Joe Pepitone
- Henry Peploski
- Hub Perdue
- Eddie Pérez
- Carlos Pérez
- Martín Pérez
- Marty Perez
- Odalis Pérez
- Pascual Pérez
- Gaylord Perry
- Gerald Perry
- Jason Perry
- Michael Petersen
- Dustin Peterson
- Dan Petry
- Big Jeff Pfeffer
- Brandon Phillips
- Damon Phillips
- Eddie Phillips
- Evan Phillips
- Taylor Phillips
- Wiley Piatt
- Ron Piché
- Charlie Pick
- Dave Pickett
- Clarence Pickrel
- Al Piechota
- Jack Pierce
- Al Pierotti
- Kevin Pillar
- Andy Pilney
- Manny Piña
- Jim Pisoni
- Togie Pittinger
- Juan Pizarro
- Biff Pocoroba
- Hugh Poland
- Luis Polonia
- Tom Poorman
- Bob Porter
- Bill Posedel
- Nels Potter
- Jay Powell
- Ray Powell
- Phil Powers
- Martín Prado
- Andy Pratt
- Todd Pratt
- Mel Preibisch
- Jim Prendergast
- Jim Presley
- Bob Priddy
- Curtis Pride
- Scott Proctor
- Jurickson Profar
- Hub Pruett
- Charlie Puleo
- Blondie Purcell
- Ewald Pyle

== Q ==
- Cal Quantrill
- Bill Quarles
- Billy Queen
- Jack Quinn
- Joe Quinn (C)
- Joe Quinn (2B)

== R ==
- John Rabb
- Charley Radbourn
- Paul Radford
- Pat Ragan
- Ed Rakow
- Horacio Ramírez
- José Ramírez
- Rafael Ramírez
- Wilkin Ramírez
- Bill Ramsey
- Newt Randall
- Merritt Ranew
- Bill Rariden
- Josh Ravin
- Johnny Rawlings
- Irv Ray
- Ken Ray
- Fred Raymer
- Claude Raymond
- Jeff Reardon
- Anthony Recker
- Mark Redman
- Billy Reed
- Michael Reed
- Ron Reed
- Steve Reed
- Wally Rehg
- Earl Reid
- Bobby Reis
- Tommy Reis
- Pete Reiser
- Chris Reitsma
- Mike Remlinger
- Édgar Rentería
- Chris Resop
- Ed Reulbach
- Jo-Jo Reyes
- Shane Reynolds
- Armando Reynoso
- Flint Rhem
- Billy Rhiel
- Del Rice
- Woody Rich
- Rusty Richards
- Antoan Richardson
- Hardy Richardson
- Lance Richbourg
- Lew Richie
- John Richmond
- Lee Richmond
- Joe Rickert
- Marv Rickert
- Harry Riconda
- Johnny Riddle
- Jeff Ridgway
- Joe Riggert
- Austin Riley
- Jim Riley
- Royce Ring
- Claude Ritchey
- Jay Ritchie
- JR Ritchie
- Ben Rivera
- Luis Rivera
- René Rivera
- Mel Roach
- Skippy Roberge
- Charlie Robertson
- Gene Robertson
- Bill Robinson
- Craig Robinson
- Humberto Robinson
- John Rocker
- Pat Rockett
- Dereck Rodríguez
- Richard Rodríguez
- Sean Rodriguez
- Chaz Roe
- Gary Roenicke
- Red Rollings
- Ed Romero
- Phil Roof
- George Rooks
- Eddie Rosario
- Víctor Rosario
- Bob Roselli
- Bunny Roser
- Steve Roser
- Chet Ross
- David Ross
- Rico Rossy
- Bama Rowell
- Ed Rowen
- Normie Roy
- Jerry Royster
- Dick Rudolph
- Chico Ruiz
- José Ruiz
- Rio Ruiz
- Paul Runge
- Bob Rush
- Chris Rusin
- Jim Russell
- John Russell
- Babe Ruth
- Dick Ruthven
- Connie Ryan
- Cyclone Ryan
- Jack Ryan
- Rosy Ryan

== S ==
- Ray Sadecki
- Bob Sadowski
- Ed Sadowski
- Johnny Sain
- Takashi Saito
- Chris Sale
- Bill Salkeld
- Jarrod Saltalamacchia
- Manny Salvo
- Clint Sammons
- Billy Sample
- Amado Samuel
- Aníbal Sánchez
- Rey Sánchez
- Tony Sanchez
- Deion Sanders
- Ray Sanders
- Reggie Sanders
- Mike Sandlock
- Pablo Sandoval
- Danny Santana
- Edgar Santana
- Al Santorini
- Ed Sauer
- Carl Sawatski
- Johnny Scalzi
- Les Scarsella
- Sid Schacht
- Hal Schacker
- Harry Schafer
- Jordan Schafer
- Scott Schebler
- Al Schellhase
- Butch Schmidt
- Jason Schmidt
- Dan Schneider
- Red Schoendienst
- Hank Schreiber
- Ron Schueler
- Dave Schuler
- Wes Schulmerich
- Jack Schulte
- Johnny Schulte
- Joe Schultz
- Bill Schuster
- Carl Schutz
- Don Schwall
- Spencer Schwellenbach
- Art Schwind
- Jack Scott
- Connor Seabold
- Rudy Seánez
- Chris Seelbach
- Socks Seibold
- Rube Sellers
- Frank Sexton
- Cy Seymour
- Joe Shannon
- Red Shannon
- Bud Sharpe
- Mike Sharperson
- Al Shaw
- Bob Shaw
- Marty Shay
- Dave Shean
- Ray Shearer
- Earl Sheely
- Ben Sheets
- Gary Sheffield
- Steve Shemo
- Bill Sherdel
- George Sherrill
- Braden Shewmake
- Steve Shields
- Jason Shiell
- Art Shires
- Milt Shoffner
- Zack Short
- Clyde Shoun
- Vince Shupe
- Jared Shuster
- Oscar Siemer
- Al Simmons
- Andrelton Simmons
- Ted Simmons
- Randall Simon
- Lucas Sims
- Matt Sinatro
- Hosea Siner
- Elmer Singleton
- Steve Sisco
- Doug Sisk
- George Sisler
- Sibby Sisti
- Craig Skok
- Jimmy Slagle
- Enos Slaughter
- Lou Sleater
- Joe Slusarski
- Aaron Small
- Hank Small
- Roy Smalley
- Bob Smith
- Dominic Smtih
- Dwight Smith
- Earl Smith
- Edgar Smith
- Elmer Smith
- Fred Smith
- Harry Smith
- Jack Smith(OF)
- Jack Smith (P)
- Jimmy Smith
- Ken Smith
- Kevan Smith
- Lonnie Smith
- Pete Smith
- Pop Smith
- Red Smith
- Stub Smith
- Tom Smith
- Travis Smith
- Will Smith
- Zane Smith
- AJ Smith-Shawver
- John Smoltz
- Drew Smyly
- Fred Snodgrass
- Pop Snyder
- Scott Sobkowiak
- Chad Sobotka
- Miguel Socolovich
- Nick Solak
- Jorge Soler
- Eddie Solomon
- Andy Sommers
- Rafael Soriano
- Mike Soroka
- Elías Sosa
- Jorge Sosa
- Bill Southworth
- Billy Southworth
- Bill Sowders
- Warren Spahn
- Albert Spalding
- Al Spangler
- Cliff Speck
- Tim Spehr
- Justin Speier
- Chet Spencer
- Ed Sperber
- Charlie Spikes
- Al Spohrer
- Tim Spooneybarger
- Harry Spratt
- Russ Springer
- Ebba St. Claire
- Randy St. Claire
- Marv Staehle
- General Stafford
- Chick Stahl
- Harry Staley
- Eddie Stanky
- Joe Stanley
- Mike Stanton
- Charlie Starr
- Ray Starr
- Harry Steinfeldt
- Fred Stem
- Bill Stemmyer
- Casey Stengel
- Jackson Stephens
- Dave Stevens
- Chris Stewart
- Joe Stewart
- Jack Stivetts
- Phil Stockman
- Otis Stocksdale
- George Stone
- Allyn Stout
- Harry Stovey
- Paul Strand
- Hunter Stratton
- Gabby Street
- Oscar Streit
- Spencer Strider
- Nick Strincevich
- Joe Stripp
- Allie Strobel
- Dutch Stryker
- Everett Stull
- George Stultz
- Bobby Sturgeon
- José Suárez
- Robert Suárez
- Wander Suero
- Andy Sullivan
- Billy Sullivan
- Denny Sullivan
- Jim Sullivan
- Joe Sullivan
- John Sullivan
- Marty Sullivan
- Mike Sullivan
- B. J. Surhoff
- Max Surkont
- Butch Sutcliffe
- Brent Suter
- Bruce Sutter
- Ezra Sutton
- Kurt Suzuki
- Pedro Swann
- Dansby Swanson
- Anthony Swarzak
- Bill Sweeney
- Bill Swift

== T ==
- John Taber
- Roy Talcott
- Chuck Tanner
- Tony Tarasco
- Freddy Tarnok
- Pop Tate
- Julián Tavárez
- Ed Taylor
- Hawk Taylor
- Zack Taylor
- Julio Teherán
- Mark Teixeira
- Rowdy Tellez
- Fred Tenney
- Frank Tepedino
- Zeb Terry
- Duane Theiss
- Tommy Thevenow
- Bert Thiel
- Tom Thobe
- Andrés Thomas
- Charles Thomas
- Connor Thomas
- Frank Thomas
- Herb Thomas
- Lane Thomas
- Lee Thomas
- Roy Thomas
- Walt Thomas
- Don Thompson
- Fuller Thompson
- Mike Thompson
- Milt Thompson
- Tommy Thompson
- Zach Thompson
- Bobby Thomson
- John Thomson
- Scott Thorman
- Tyler Thornburg
- Bob Thorpe
- Jim Thorpe
- Ty Tice
- Bobby Tiefenauer
- Cotton Tierney
- Bob Tillman
- John Titus
- Jim Tobin
- Josh Tomlin
- Michael Tonkin
- Earl Torgeson
- Red Torphy
- Frank Torre
- Joe Torre
- Pablo Torrealba
- Steve Torrealba
- Lou Tost
- Clay Touchstone
- Touki Toussaint
- Ira Townsend
- Leo Townsend
- Walt Tragesser
- Jeff Treadway
- Alex Treviño
- Chadwick Tromp
- Sam Trott
- Bob Trowbridge
- Michael Tucker
- Preston Tucker
- Tommy Tucker
- Tom Tuckey
- Jim Turner
- George Twombly
- Fred Tyler
- Johnnie Tyler
- Lefty Tyler
- Jim Tyng

== U ==
- Bob Uecker
- Dan Uggla
- Mike Ulicny
- Arnold Umbach
- Tim Unroe
- Bill Upham
- Cecil Upshaw
- Melvin Upton Jr.
- Justin Upton
- Luke Urban
- Billy Urbanski
- Gio Urshela

== V ==
- Marc Valdes
- Sandy Valdespino
- Luis Valdez
- Sergio Valdez
- Bill Van Dyke
- Roberto Vargas
- Bill Vargus
- Pete Varney
- Anthony Varvaro
- Jorge Vásquez
- Jim Vatcher
- Charlie Vaughan
- Javier Vázquez
- Al Veigel
- Freddie Velázquez
- Pat Veltman
- Jonny Venters
- Quilvio Veras
- Emil Verban
- Alex Verdugo
- Mickey Vernon
- Zoilo Versalles
- Lee Viau
- Óscar Villarreal
- Ismael Villegas
- Darius Vines
- Ozzie Virgil Jr.
- Arodys Vizcaíno
- Stephen Vogt
- Bill Voiselle
- Jake Volz
- Tony Von Fricken
- Phil Voyles

== W ==
- Terrell Wade
- Bill Wagner
- Billy Wagner
- Jordan Walden
- Hurston Waldrep
- Bob Walk
- Jeremy Walker
- Forrest Wall
- Murray Wall
- Lefty Wallace
- Norm Wallen
- Ed Walsh
- Joe Walsh
- Bucky Walters
- Jerome Walton
- Lloyd Waner
- Paul Waner
- Daryle Ward
- Duane Ward
- John Warner
- Rabbit Warstler
- Link Wasem
- Claudell Washington
- Bob Watson
- Mule Watson
- Ken Weafer
- Orlie Weaver
- Jacob Webb
- Bert Weeden
- Patrick Weigel
- Roy Weir
- Walt Weiss
- Jimmy Welsh
- Don Wengert
- Joey Wentz
- Stan Wentzel
- Johnny Werts
- Mark Wasinger
- Frank West
- Max West
- Oscar Westerberg
- Al Weston
- Jeff Wetherby
- Bert Whaling
- Bobby Wheelock
- Tom Whelan
- Pete Whisenant
- Larry Whisenton
- Bob Whitcher
- Charlie White
- Deacon White
- Eli White
- Ernie White
- Jack White
- Kirby White
- Sam White
- Sammy White
- Steve White
- Will White
- Ed Whited
- Gil Whitehouse
- Gurdon Whiteley
- Mark Whiten
- Matt Whiteside
- Chase Whitley
- Frank Whitney
- Jim Whitney
- Pinky Whitney
- Ernie Whitt
- Possum Whitted
- Al Wickland
- Bob Wickman
- Whitey Wietelmann
- Claude Wilborn
- Nathan Wiles
- Hoyt Wilhelm
- Kaiser Wilhelm
- Joe Wilhoit
- Jerry Willard
- Carl Willey
- Earl Williams (C)
- Earl Williams (C/1B)
- Gerald Williams
- Luke Williams
- Pop Williams
- Vic Willis
- Art Wilson
- Bryse Wilson
- Charlie Wilson
- Craig Wilson
- Frank Wilson
- Jack Wilson
- Jim Wilson
- Zeke Wilson
- Allan Winans
- Joe Winkelsas
- Dan Winkler
- Casey Wise
- DeWayne Wise
- Nick Wise
- Sam Wise
- Brett Wisely
- Matt Wisler
- Roy Witherup
- Mark Wohlers
- Harry Wolverton
- Sid Womack
- Brad Woodall
- George Woodend
- William Woods
- Chris Woodward
- Woody Woodward
- Chuck Workman
- Red Worthington
- Ab Wright
- Al Wright
- Ed Wright
- George Wright
- Harry Wright
- Jaret Wright
- Kyle Wright
- Sam Wright
- Jimmy Wynn
- Austin Wynns

== Y ==
- Kirby Yates
- Tyler Yates
- Mike Yastrzemski
- George Yeager
- Al Yeargin
- Bill Yerrick
- Huascar Ynoa
- Cy Young
- Danny Young
- Harley Young
- Herman Young
- Irv Young
- Matt Young

== Z ==
- Tom Zachary
- Steve Ziem
- Guy Zinn
- Paul Zuvella
