= 1907 Boston Doves season =

1907 Boston Doves
- League: National League
- Ballpark: South End Grounds
- City: Boston, Massachusetts
- Record: 58–90 (.392)
- League place: 7th
- Owners: George Dovey, John Dovey
- Managers: Fred Tenney

The 1907 Boston Doves season was the 37th season of the franchise. Before the season, longtime Boston Beaneaters owner Arthur Soden sold the team to the Dovey Brothers. The team quickly became known as the Boston Doves, named after the brothers. One bright spot during a 90-loss season came on May 8, when Big Jeff Pfeffer pitched a no-hitter in a 6–0 home win over the Cincinnati Reds.

== Regular season ==
=== Season standings ===
National League
Team	W	L	Pct.	GB	Home	Road
Chicago Cubs	107	45	.704	—	54‍–‍19	53‍–‍26
Pittsburgh Pirates	91	63	.591	17	47‍–‍29	44‍–‍34
Philadelphia Phillies	83	64	.565	21½	45‍–‍30	38‍–‍34
New York Giants	82	71	.536	25½	45‍–‍30	37‍–‍41
Brooklyn Superbas	65	83	.439	40	37‍–‍38	28‍–‍45
Cincinnati Reds	66	87	.431	41½	43‍–‍36	23‍–‍51
Boston Doves	58	90	.392	47	31‍–‍42	27‍–‍48
St. Louis Cardinals	52	101	.340	55½	31‍–‍47	21‍–‍54

=== Record vs. opponents ===
1907 National League record Sources:
Team	BSN	BRO	CHC	CIN	NYG	PHI	PIT	STL
Boston	—	12–7–2	5–17	9–13	9–13	8–11–1	9–13–1	6–16
Brooklyn	7–12–2	—	5–15–1	15–7–1	10–12–1	8–13	6–16	14–8
Chicago	17–5	15–5–1	—	17–5	16–6	14–8	12–10–1	16–6–1
Cincinnati	13–9	7–15–1	5–17	—	9–13–1	8–13	10–12–1	14–8
New York	13–9	12–10–1	6–16	13–9–1	—	11–10	10–12	17–5
Philadelphia	11–8–1	13–8	8–14	13–8	10–11	—	14–8	14–7–1
Pittsburgh	13–9–1	16–6	10–12–1	12–10–1	12–10	8–14	—	20–2
St. Louis	16–6	8–14	6–16–1	8–14	5–17	7–14–1	2–20	—

=== Roster ===
1907 Boston Doves
Roster
Pitchers: Frank Barberich; Jake Boultes; Rube Dessau; Gus Dorner; Patsy Flaherty; Sam Frock; Vive Lindaman; Ernie Lindemann; Big Jeff Pfeffer; Irv Young	Catchers: Tom Asmussen; Jim Ball; Sam Brown; Joe Knotts; Tom Needham; Jess Orndorff; Infielders: Dave Brain; Al Bridwell; Bob Brush; Claude Ritchey; Bill Sweeney; Fred Tenney; Oscar Westerberg	Outfielders: Johnny Bates; Ginger Beaumont; Frank Burke; Izzy Hoffman; Del Howard; Newt Randall	Manager: Fred Tenney

== Player stats ==
=== Batting ===
==== Starters by position ====
Note: Pos = Position; G = Games played; AB = At bats; H = Hits; Avg. = Batting average; HR = Home runs; RBI = Runs batted in

Pos	Player	G	AB	H	Avg.	HR	RBI
C	Tom Needham	86	260	51	.196	1	19
1B	Fred Tenney	150	554	151	.273	0	26
2B	Claude Ritchey	144	499	127	.255	2	51
SS	Al Bridwell	140	509	111	.218	0	26
3B	Dave Brain	133	509	142	.279	10	56
OF	Ginger Beaumont	150	580	187	.322	4	62
OF	Johnny Bates	126	447	116	.260	2	49
OF	Newt Randall	75	258	55	.213	0	15

==== Other batters ====
Note: G = Games played; AB = At bats; H = Hits; Avg. = Batting average; HR = Home runs; RBI = Runs batted in

Player	G	AB	H	Avg.	HR	RBI
Sam Brown	70	208	40	.192	0	14
Bill Sweeney	58	191	50	.262	0	18
Del Howard	50	187	51	.273	1	13
Frank Burke	43	129	23	.178	0	8
Izzy Hoffman	19	86	24	.279	0	3
Jim Ball	10	36	6	.167	0	3
Jess Orndorff	5	17	2	.118	0	0
Joe Knotts	3	8	0	.000	0	0
Oscar Westerberg	2	6	2	.333	0	1
Tom Asmussen	2	5	0	.000	0	0
Bob Brush	2	2	0	.000	0	0

=== Pitching ===
==== Starting pitchers ====
Note: G = Games pitched; IP = Innings pitched; W = Wins; L = Losses; ERA = Earned run average; SO = Strikeouts

Player	G	IP	W	L	ERA	SO
Gus Dorner	36	271.1	12	16	3.12	85
Vive Lindaman	34	260.0	11	15	3.63	90
Irv Young	40	245.1	10	23	3.96	86
Patsy Flaherty	27	217.0	12	15	3.70	34
Big Jeff Pfeffer	19	144.0	6	8	3.00	65
Frank Barberich	2	12.1	1	1	5.84	1
Rube Dessau	2	9.1	0	1	10.61	1
Ernie Lindemann	1	6.1	0	0	5.68	3

==== Other pitchers ====
Note: G = Games pitched; IP = Innings pitched; W = Wins; L = Losses; ERA = Earned run average; SO = Strikeouts

Player	G	IP	W	L	ERA	SO
Jake Boultes	24	139.2	5	9	2.71	49
Sam Frock	5	33.1	1	2	2.47	12
