= 1907 Chicago Cubs season =

Major League Baseball season

1907 Chicago Cubs
- World Series champions National League champions
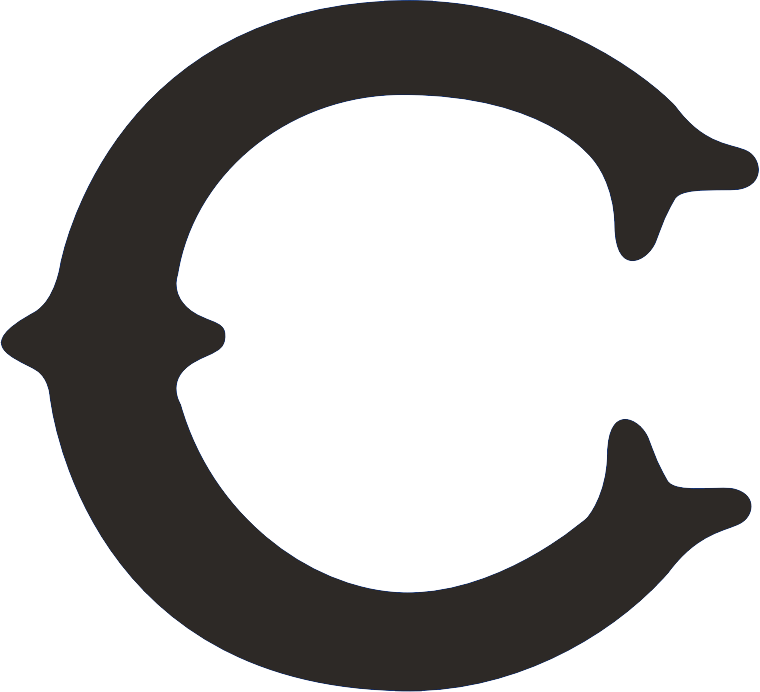
- League: National League
- Ballpark: West Side Park
- City: Chicago
- Record: 107–45 (.704)
- League place: 1st
- Owners: Charles Murphy
- Managers: Frank Chance

The 1907 Chicago Cubs season was the 36th season of the Chicago Cubs franchise, the 32nd in the National League and the 15th at West Side Park. It was the first season that the Chicago Cubs became the franchise's name officially. The team finished in first place in the National League with a record of 107–45, 17 games ahead of the Pittsburgh Pirates. It was their second straight NL pennant. The Cubs faced the Detroit Tigers in the World Series, which they won four games to none (with one tie) for their first World Series victory.

== Regular season ==
=== Season standings ===
National League
Team	W	L	Pct.	GB	Home	Road
Chicago Cubs	107	45	.704	—	54‍–‍19	53‍–‍26
Pittsburgh Pirates	91	63	.591	17	47‍–‍29	44‍–‍34
Philadelphia Phillies	83	64	.565	21½	45‍–‍30	38‍–‍34
New York Giants	82	71	.536	25½	45‍–‍30	37‍–‍41
Brooklyn Superbas	65	83	.439	40	37‍–‍38	28‍–‍45
Cincinnati Reds	66	87	.431	41½	43‍–‍36	23‍–‍51
Boston Doves	58	90	.392	47	31‍–‍42	27‍–‍48
St. Louis Cardinals	52	101	.340	55½	31‍–‍47	21‍–‍54

=== Record vs. opponents ===
1907 National League record Sources:
Team	BSN	BRO	CHC	CIN	NYG	PHI	PIT	STL
Boston	—	12–7–2	5–17	9–13	9–13	8–11–1	9–13–1	6–16
Brooklyn	7–12–2	—	5–15–1	15–7–1	10–12–1	8–13	6–16	14–8
Chicago	17–5	15–5–1	—	17–5	16–6	14–8	12–10–1	16–6–1
Cincinnati	13–9	7–15–1	5–17	—	9–13–1	8–13	10–12–1	14–8
New York	13–9	12–10–1	6–16	13–9–1	—	11–10	10–12	17–5
Philadelphia	11–8–1	13–8	8–14	13–8	10–11	—	14–8	14–7–1
Pittsburgh	13–9–1	16–6	10–12–1	12–10–1	12–10	8–14	—	20–2
St. Louis	16–6	8–14	6–16–1	8–14	5–17	7–14–1	2–20	—

=== Roster ===
1907 Chicago Cubs roster
Roster
Pitchers: Mordecai Brown; Blaine Durbin; Chick Fraser; Carl Lundgren; Orval Overall; Jack Pfiester; Ed Reulbach; Jack Taylor	Catchers: Jack Hardy; Mike Kahoe; Johnny Kling; Pat Moran; Infielders: Frank Chance; Johnny Evers; Del Howard; Harry Steinfeldt; Bill Sweeney; Joe Tinker; Heinie Zimmerman	Outfielders: Solly Hofman; Newt Randall; Frank Schulte; Jimmy Sheckard; Jimmy Slagle	Manager: Frank Chance

== Player stats ==
=== Batting ===
==== Starters by position ====
Note: Pos = Position; G = Games played; AB = At bats; H = Hits; Avg. = Batting average; HR = Home runs; RBI = Runs batted in

Pos	Player	G	AB	H	Avg.	HR	RBI
C	Johnny Kling	104	334	95	.284	1	43
1B	Frank Chance	111	382	112	.293	1	49
2B	Johnny Evers	151	508	127	.250	2	51
SS	Joe Tinker	117	402	89	.221	1	36
3B	Harry Steinfeldt	152	542	144	.266	1	70
OF	Jimmy Sheckard	143	484	129	.267	1	36
OF	Jimmy Slagle	136	489	126	.258	0	32
OF	Frank Schulte	97	342	98	.287	2	32

==== Other batters ====
Note: G = Games played; AB = At bats; H = Hits; Avg. = Batting average; HR = Home runs; RBI = Runs batted in

Player	G	AB	H	Avg.	HR	RBI
Solly Hofman	134	470	126	.268	1	36
Pat Moran	65	198	45	.227	1	19
Del Howard	51	148	34	.230	0	13
Newt Randall	22	78	16	.205	0	4
Blaine Durbin	11	18	6	.333	0	0
Bill Sweeney	3	10	1	.100	0	1
Mike Kahoe	5	10	4	.400	0	1
Heinie Zimmerman	5	9	2	.222	0	1
Jack Hardy	1	4	1	.250	0	0

=== Pitching ===
==== Starting pitchers ====
Note: G = Games pitched; IP = Innings pitched; W = Wins; L = Losses; ERA = Earned run average; SO = Strikeouts

Player	G	IP	W	L	ERA	SO
Orval Overall	36	268.1	23	7	1.68	141
Mordecai Brown	34	233.0	20	6	1.39	107
Carl Lundgren	28	207.0	18	7	1.17	84
Jack Pfiester	30	195.0	14	9	1.15	90
Ed Reulbach	27	192.0	17	4	1.69	96
Chick Fraser	22	138.1	8	5	3.29	41
Jack Taylor	18	123.0	7	5	1.39	22

==== Other pitchers ====
Note: G = Games pitched; IP = Innings pitched; W = Wins; L = Losses; ERA = Earned run average; SO = Strikeouts

Player	G	IP	W	L	ERA	SO
Blaine Durbin	5	16.2	0	1	5.40	5

== 1907 World Series ==
NL Chicago Cubs (4) vs AL Detroit Tigers (0)

Game	Score	Date	Location	Attendance
1	Tigers – 3, Cubs – 3 (12 innings)	October 8	West Side Park	24,377
2	Tigers – 1, Cubs – 3	October 9	West Side Park	21,901
3	Tigers – 1, Cubs – 5	October 10	West Side Park	13,114
4	Cubs – 6, Tigers – 1	October 11	Bennett Park	11,306
5	Cubs – 2, Tigers – 1	October 12	Bennett Park	7,370
