= Jack Barnett (baseball) =

American baseball player (1879–1923)

- Outfielder
- Born: December 16, 1879; Ventura, California, U.S.
- Died: September 3, 1923 (aged 43); Modoc County, California, U.S.
- Batted: Both Threw: Unknown

MLB debut
- July 2, 1907, for the St. Louis Cardinals

Last MLB appearance
- September 20, 1907, for the St. Louis Cardinals

MLB statistics
- Batting average: .238
- Home runs: 0
- Runs batted in: 12
- Stats at Baseball Reference

Teams
- St. Louis Cardinals (1907)

John Jeirus Barnett (December 16, 1879 – September 3, 1923) was an American professional baseball player who played outfield in the major leagues for the 1907 St. Louis Cardinals. He died after being accidentally shot while hunting.
