= 1907 Pittsburgh Pirates season =

1907 Pittsburgh Pirates
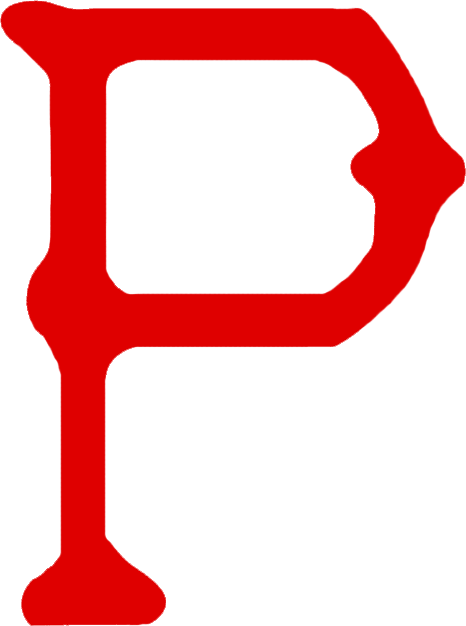
- League: National League
- Ballpark: Exposition Park
- City: Pittsburgh, Pennsylvania (Note: From 1882-1906, the team played in Allegheny, Pennsylvania, which became annexed by Pittsburgh as the North Side in 1907.)
- Record: 91–63 (.591)
- League place: 2nd
- Owners: Barney Dreyfuss
- Managers: Fred Clarke

The 1907 Pittsburgh (Note: In the early 20th century and earlier, the name of Pittsburgh was spelled with and without the 'h'.) Pirates season was the 26th season for the Pittsburgh Pirates franchise. It involved the Pirates finishing second in the National League.

The offense was led by Tommy Leach and Hall of Famers Honus Wagner and Fred Clarke. Wagner led the NL in batting average, on-base percentage, slugging percentage, and stolen bases. The Pirates scored the most runs of any team.

== Regular season ==
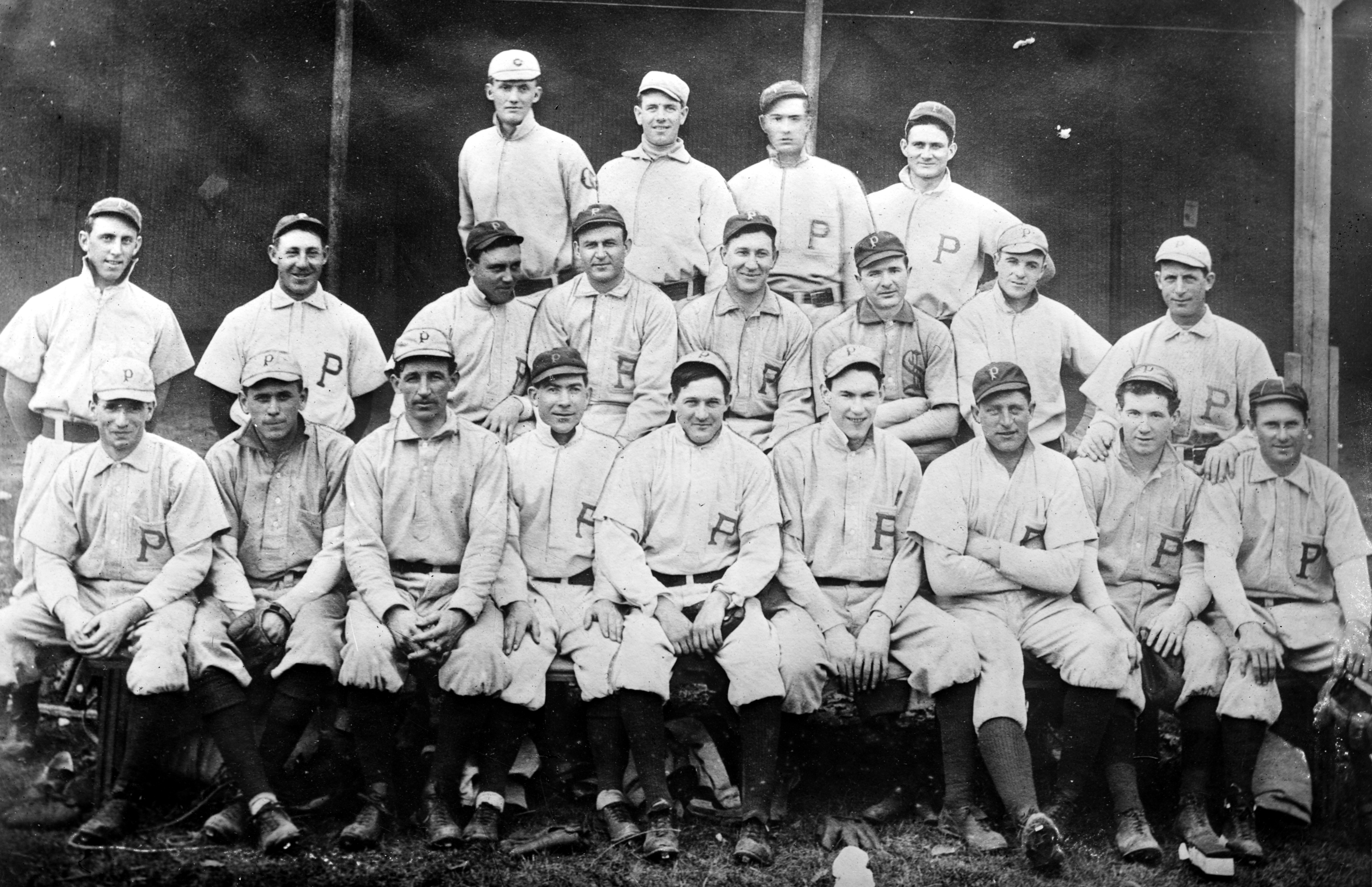

=== Season standings ===
National League
Team	W	L	Pct.	GB	Home	Road
Chicago Cubs	107	45	.704	—	54‍–‍19	53‍–‍26
Pittsburgh Pirates	91	63	.591	17	47‍–‍29	44‍–‍34
Philadelphia Phillies	83	64	.565	21½	45‍–‍30	38‍–‍34
New York Giants	82	71	.536	25½	45‍–‍30	37‍–‍41
Brooklyn Superbas	65	83	.439	40	37‍–‍38	28‍–‍45
Cincinnati Reds	66	87	.431	41½	43‍–‍36	23‍–‍51
Boston Doves	58	90	.392	47	31‍–‍42	27‍–‍48
St. Louis Cardinals	52	101	.340	55½	31‍–‍47	21‍–‍54

=== Record vs. opponents ===
1907 National League record Sources:
Team	BSN	BRO	CHC	CIN	NYG	PHI	PIT	STL
Boston	—	12–7–2	5–17	9–13	9–13	8–11–1	9–13–1	6–16
Brooklyn	7–12–2	—	5–15–1	15–7–1	10–12–1	8–13	6–16	14–8
Chicago	17–5	15–5–1	—	17–5	16–6	14–8	12–10–1	16–6–1
Cincinnati	13–9	7–15–1	5–17	—	9–13–1	8–13	10–12–1	14–8
New York	13–9	12–10–1	6–16	13–9–1	—	11–10	10–12	17–5
Philadelphia	11–8–1	13–8	8–14	13–8	10–11	—	14–8	14–7–1
Pittsburgh	13–9–1	16–6	10–12–1	12–10–1	12–10	8–14	—	20–2
St. Louis	16–6	8–14	6–16–1	8–14	5–17	7–14–1	2–20	—

=== Roster ===
1907 Pittsburgh Pirates
Roster
Pitchers: Babe Adams; King Brady; Howie Camnitz; Bill Duggleby; Sam Leever; Lefty Leifield; Mike Lynch; Nick Maddox; Bill Otey; Deacon Phillippe; Connie Walsh; Vic Willis; Harry Wolter	Catchers: George Gibson; Billy Kelsey; Ed Phelps; Harry Smith; Infielders: Ed Abbaticchio; Marc Campbell; Bill McKechnie; Jim Nealon; Tommy Sheehan; Alan Storke; Harry Swacina; Honus Wagner	Outfielders: Goat Anderson; Fred Clarke; Otis Clymer; Bill Hallman; Tommy Leach; Harl Maggert; Danny Moeller	Manager: Fred Clarke

== Player stats ==
=== Batting ===
==== Starters by position ====
Note: Pos = Position; G = Games played; AB = At bats; H = Hits; Avg. = Batting average; HR = Home runs; RBI = Runs batted in

Pos	Player	G	AB	H	Avg.	HR	RBI
C	George Gibson	113	382	84	.220	3	35
1B	Jim Nealon	105	381	98	.257	0	47
2B	Ed Abbaticchio	147	496	130	.262	2	82
3B	Alan Storke	112	357	92	.258	1	39
SS	Honus Wagner	142	515	180	.350	6	82
OF	Tommy Leach	149	547	166	.303	4	43
OF	Fred Clarke	148	501	145	.289	2	59
OF	Goat Anderson	127	413	85	.206	1	12

==== Other batters ====
Note: G = Games played; AB = At bats; H = Hits; Avg. = Batting average; HR = Home runs; RBI = Runs batted in

Player	G	AB	H	Avg.	HR	RBI
Bill Hallman	94	302	67	.222	0	15
Tommy Sheehan	75	226	62	.274	0	25
Ed Phelps	43	113	24	.212	0	12
Harry Swacina	26	95	19	.200	0	10
Otis Clymer	22	66	15	.227	0	4
Danny Moeller	11	42	12	.286	0	3
Harry Smith	18	38	10	.263	0	1
Bill McKechnie	3	8	1	.125	0	0
Harl Maggert	3	6	0	.000	0	0
Billy Kelsey	2	5	2	.400	0	0
Marc Campbell	2	4	1	.250	0	1

=== Pitching ===
==== Starting pitchers ====
Note: G = Games pitched; IP = Innings pitched; W = Wins; L = Losses; ERA = Earned run average; SO = Strikeouts

Player	G	IP	W	L	ERA	SO
Vic Willis	39	292.2	21	11	2.34	107
Lefty Leifield	40	286.0	20	16	2.33	112
Sam Leever	31	216.2	14	9	1.66	65
Deacon Phillippe	35	214.0	14	11	2.61	61
Nick Maddox	6	54.0	5	1	0.83	38
Babe Adams	4	22.0	0	2	6.95	11

==== Other pitchers ====
Note: G = Games pitched; IP = Innings pitched; W = Wins; L = Losses; ERA = Earned run average; SO = Strikeouts

Player	G	IP	W	L	ERA	SO
Howie Camnitz	31	180.0	13	8	2.15	85
Bill Duggleby	9	40.1	2	2	2.68	4
Mike Lynch	7	36.0	2	2	2.25	9
Bill Otey	3	16.1	0	1	4.41	5

==== Relief pitchers ====
Note: G = Games pitched; W = Wins; L = Losses; SV = Saves; ERA = Earned run average; SO = Strikeouts

Player	G	W	L	SV	ERA	SO
King Brady	1	0	0	0	0.00	0
Harry Wolter	1	0	0	0	4.50	0
Connie Walsh	1	0	0	0	9.00	0

== Awards and honors ==
=== League top five finishers ===
League leaders in bold

- Ed Abbaticchio: #2 runs batted in (82)
- Fred Clarke: #4 runs scored (97)
- Fred Clarke: #5 on-base percentage (.383)
- Tommy Leach: #2 runs scored (102)
- Tommy Leach: #4 batting average (.303)
- Tommy Leach: #4 stolen bases (43)
- Sam Leever: #4 earned run average (1.66)
- Lefty Leifield: #5 wins (20)
- **Honus Wagner: #1 batting average (.350)**
- **Honus Wagner: #1 stolen bases (61)**
- **Honus Wagner: #1 on-base percentage (.408)**
- **Honus Wagner: #1 slugging percentage (.513)**
- Honus Wagner: #2 runs batted in (82)
- Honus Wagner: #3 runs scored (98)
- Vic Willis: #4 wins (21)
