= Jess Orndorff =

American baseball player (1881-1960)

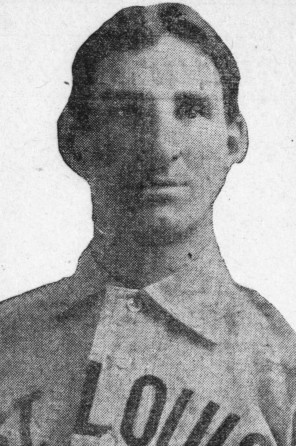
- Catcher
- Born: January 15, 1881; Chicago, Illinois, U.S.
- Died: September 28, 1960 (aged 79); Cardiff-by-the-Sea, California, U.S.
- Batted: Both Threw: Right

MLB debut
- April 18, 1907, for the Boston Doves

Last MLB appearance
- April 24, 1907, for the Boston Doves

MLB statistics
- Games played: 5
- At bats: 17
- Hits: 2
- Stats at Baseball Reference

Teams
- Boston Doves (1907)

Jesse Walworth Thayer Orndorff (January 15, 1881 – September 28, 1960) was an American Major League Baseball catcher. He played for the Boston Doves in 1907. He played parts of nine seasons in the minor leagues from 1904 to 1917.

Orndorff wrote a booklet called "The Fundamentals of How to Play Baseball" in 1936 when he was head instructor of the National Baseball School in Los Angeles.
