= Lance Richbourg =

American baseball player (1897–1975)

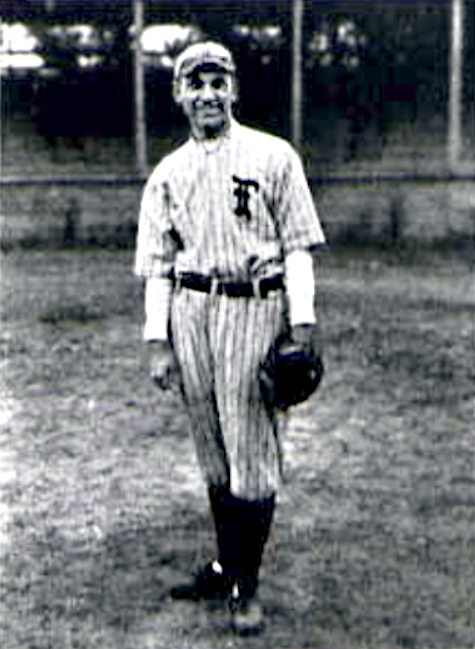
- Richbourg from 1922; Seminole yearbook
- Right fielder
- Born: December 18, 1897; DeFuniak Springs, Florida, U.S.
- Died: September 10, 1975 (aged 77); Crestview, Florida, U.S.
- Batted: Left Threw: Right

MLB debut
- July 4, 1921, for the Philadelphia Phillies

Last MLB appearance
- September 25, 1932, for the Chicago Cubs

MLB statistics
- Batting average: .308
- Hits: 806
- Runs scored: 378
- Runs batted in: 247
- Home runs: 13
- Stats at Baseball Reference

Teams
- Philadelphia Phillies (1921); Washington Senators (1924); Boston Braves (1927–1931); Chicago Cubs (1932)

Lance Clayton Richbourg (December 18, 1897 – September 10, 1975) was an American professional baseball player who was a Major League right fielder for eight seasons between 1921 and 1932. Richbourg played college baseball for the University of Florida, and thereafter, he played professionally for the Philadelphia Phillies, Washington Senators, Boston Braves and Chicago Cubs. Richbourg was a career .308 hitter (806-2619) with 13 home runs and 247 RBI in 698 games played.

== Early years ==
Richbourg was born in DeFuniak Springs, Florida, in the Florida Panhandle, in 1897. He graduated from Walton High School in DeFuniak Springs. The high school adopted the nickname of "Braves" because Richbourg was a member of the Boston Braves in 1926.

== College career ==
He attended the University of Florida in Gainesville, Florida, where he played for the Florida Gators baseball team for a single season in 1919. He graduated from Florida with a bachelor's degree in 1922. In between stints in the major leagues, Richbourg returned to Gainesville to coach the Gators baseball team in 1922 and 1923, and again in 1926. He compiled a win–loss record of 39–21 (.650) in his three seasons as the Gators' head coach.

Richbourg died in Crestview, Florida, in 1975; he was 77 years old.

== See also ==
- Boston Braves all-time roster
- Chicago Cubs all-time roster
- List of Florida Gators baseball players
- List of University of Florida alumni
- Philadelphia Phillies all-time roster
