= Connie Walsh =

American baseball player (1882–1953)

- Pitcher
- Born: April 23, 1882; St. Louis, Missouri, U.S.
- Died: April 5, 1953 (aged 70); St. Louis, Missouri, U.S.
- Batted: Unknown Threw: Right

MLB debut
- September 16, 1907, for the Pittsburgh Pirates

Last MLB appearance
- September 16, 1907, for the Pittsburgh Pirates

MLB statistics
- Innings pitched: 1.0
- Earned run average: 9.00
- Stats at Baseball Reference

Teams
- Pittsburgh Pirates (1907)

Cornelius Robert Walsh (April 23, 1882 – April 5, 1953) was an American Major League Baseball pitcher who appeared in one game for the Pittsburgh Pirates in its 1907 season, allowing one earned run on one hit and a walk without a strikeout in just one inning of work.
