= 1907 St. Louis Cardinals season =

Major League Baseball season

1907 St. Louis Cardinals
- League: National League
- Ballpark: League Park
- City: St. Louis, Missouri
- Record: 52–101 (.340)
- League place: 8th
- Owners: Frank Robison and Stanley Robison
- Managers: John McCloskey

The 1907 St. Louis Cardinals season was the team's 26th season in St. Louis, Missouri and its 16th season in the National League. The Cardinals went 52–101 during the season and finished eighth and last in the eight-team National League.

== Regular season ==
=== Season standings ===
National League
Team	W	L	Pct.	GB	Home	Road
Chicago Cubs	107	45	.704	—	54‍–‍19	53‍–‍26
Pittsburgh Pirates	91	63	.591	17	47‍–‍29	44‍–‍34
Philadelphia Phillies	83	64	.565	21½	45‍–‍30	38‍–‍34
New York Giants	82	71	.536	25½	45‍–‍30	37‍–‍41
Brooklyn Superbas	65	83	.439	40	37‍–‍38	28‍–‍45
Cincinnati Reds	66	87	.431	41½	43‍–‍36	23‍–‍51
Boston Doves	58	90	.392	47	31‍–‍42	27‍–‍48
St. Louis Cardinals	52	101	.340	55½	31‍–‍47	21‍–‍54

=== Record vs. opponents ===
1907 National League record Sources:
Team	BSN	BRO	CHC	CIN	NYG	PHI	PIT	STL
Boston	—	12–7–2	5–17	9–13	9–13	8–11–1	9–13–1	6–16
Brooklyn	7–12–2	—	5–15–1	15–7–1	10–12–1	8–13	6–16	14–8
Chicago	17–5	15–5–1	—	17–5	16–6	14–8	12–10–1	16–6–1
Cincinnati	13–9	7–15–1	5–17	—	9–13–1	8–13	10–12–1	14–8
New York	13–9	12–10–1	6–16	13–9–1	—	11–10	10–12	17–5
Philadelphia	11–8–1	13–8	8–14	13–8	10–11	—	14–8	14–7–1
Pittsburgh	13–9–1	16–6	10–12–1	12–10–1	12–10	8–14	—	20–2
St. Louis	16–6	8–14	6–16–1	8–14	5–17	7–14–1	2–20	—

=== Roster ===
1907 St. Louis Cardinals
Roster
Pitchers: Fred Beebe; Buster Brown; Carl Druhot; Art Fromme; Ed Karger; Johnny Lush; Stoney McGlynn; Bugs Raymond; Charlie Shields	Catchers: Doc Marshall; Pete Noonan; Infielders: Harry Arndt; Moose Baxter; Jake Beckley; Pug Bennett; Bobby Byrne; Forrest Crawford; Art Hoelskoetter; Ed Holly; Ed Konetchy	Outfielders: Shad Barry; Al Burch; Jack Barnett; Joe Delahanty; Buck Hopkins; John Kelly; Red Murray; Tom O'Hara; Al Shaw; Harry Wolter	Manager: John McCloskey

== Player stats ==
=== Batting ===
==== Starters by position ====
Note: Pos = Position; G = Games played; AB = At bats; H = Hits; Avg. = Batting average; HR = Home runs; RBI = Runs batted in

Pos	Player	G	AB	H	Avg.	HR	RBI
C	Doc Marshall	84	268	54	.201	2	18
1B	Ed Konetchy	91	331	83	.251	2	30
2B	Pug Bennett	87	324	72	.222	0	21
SS	Ed Holly	150	545	125	.229	1	40
3B	Bobby Byrne	149	559	143	.256	0	29
OF	Shad Barry	81	294	73	.248	0	19
OF	Jack Barnett	59	206	49	.238	0	12
OF	Red Murray	132	485	127	.262	7	46

==== Other batters ====
Note: G = Games played; AB = At bats; H = Hits; Avg. = Batting average; HR = Home runs; RBI = Runs batted in

Player	G	AB	H	Avg.	HR	RBI
Art Hoelskoetter	119	397	98	.247	2	28
Pete Noonan	74	237	53	.224	1	16
John Kelly	53	197	37	.188	0	6
Tom O'Hara	48	173	41	.237	0	5
Al Burch	48	154	35	.227	0	5
Jake Beckley	32	115	24	.209	0	7
Harry Wolter	16	47	16	.340	0	6
Buck Hopkins	15	44	6	.136	0	3
Harry Arndt	11	32	6	.188	0	2
Al Shaw	9	25	7	.280	0	1
Forrest Crawford	7	22	5	.227	0	3
Joe Delahanty	7	22	7	.318	1	2
Moose Baxter	6	21	4	.190	0	0

=== Pitching ===
==== Starting pitchers ====
Note: G = Games pitched; IP = Innings pitched; W = Wins; L = Losses; ERA = Earned run average; SO = Strikeouts

Player	G	IP	W	L	ERA	SO
Stoney McGlynn	45	352.1	14	25	2.91	109
Ed Karger	39	314.0	15	19	2.04	137
Fred Beebe	31	238.1	7	19	2.72	141
Johnny Lush	20	144.0	7	10	2.50	71
Bugs Raymond	8	64.2	2	4	1.67	34
Buster Brown	9	63.2	1	6	3.39	17
Harry Wolter	3	23.0	0	2	4.30	8
Carl Druhot	1	2.1	0	1	15.43	1

==== Other pitchers ====
Note: G = Games pitched; IP = Innings pitched; W = Wins; L = Losses; ERA = Earned run average; SO = Strikeouts

Player	G	IP	W	L	ERA	SO
Art Fromme	23	145.2	5	13	2.90	67
Charlie Shields	3	6.2	0	2	9.45	1

==== Relief pitchers ====
Note: G = Games pitched; W = Wins; L = Losses; SV = Saves; ERA = Earned run average; SO = Strikeouts

Player	G	W	L	SV	ERA	SO
Art Hoelskoetter	2	0	0	0	5.73	8
