= Mike Lynch (pitcher) =

American baseball player (1880–1927)

- Pitcher
- Born: June 28, 1880; Holyoke, Massachusetts, U.S.
- Died: April 2, 1927 (aged 46); Garrison, New York, U.S.
- Batted: Right Threw: Right

MLB debut
- June 21, 1904, for the Pittsburgh Pirates

Last MLB appearance
- September 25, 1907, for the New York Giants

MLB statistics
- Win–loss record: 43–32
- Earned run average: 3.05
- Strikeouts: 292

Teams
- Pittsburgh Pirates (1904–1907); New York Giants (1907)

Michael Joseph Lynch (June 28, 1880 – April 2, 1927) was an American pitcher in Major League Baseball from 1904 to 1907. He pitched for the Pittsburgh Pirates and the New York Giants. He attended Brown University.
