= Denny Sullivan (third baseman) =

American baseball player (1858–1925)

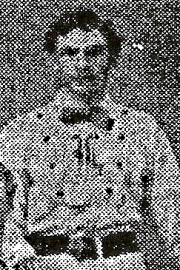
- Third baseman
- Born: June 26, 1858; Boston, Massachusetts, U.S.
- Died: December 31, 1925 (aged 67); Revere, Massachusetts, U.S.
- Batted: Unknown Threw: Right

MLB debut
- August 25, 1879, for the Providence Grays

Last MLB appearance
- September 25, 1880, for the Boston Red Caps

MLB statistics
- Batting average: .261
- Home runs: 0
- Runs batted in: 3
- Stats at Baseball Reference

Teams
- Providence Grays (1879); Boston Red Caps (1880)

Dennis J. Sullivan (June 26, 1858 – December 31, 1925) was an American utility player in Major League Baseball, playing mainly as a third baseman for the Providence Grays (1879) and Boston Red Caps (1880) of the National League. A native of Boston, Massachusetts, Sullivan attended Boston College and College of the Holy Cross. Listed at 5 ft 9 in (1.75 m), 170 lb., he threw right-handed (unknown batting side).

In a six-game career, Sullivan was a .261 hitter (6-for-23) with six runs, three RBI, and two doubles without home runs. He made six appearances as a third baseman (4), catcher (1) and left fielder (1), and was a member of the Providence 1879 National League champions.

Sullivan died at the age of 67 in his homeland of Boston, Massachusetts.

== See also ==
- 1879 Providence Grays season
- 1880 Boston Red Caps season
