= John Kelly (outfielder) =

American baseball player (1879–1944)

- Outfielder
- Born: March 13, 1879; Clifton Heights, Pennsylvania, U.S.
- Died: March 19, 1944 (aged 65); Baltimore, Maryland, U.S.
- Batted: Unknown Threw: Unknown

MLB debut
- April 11, 1907, for the St. Louis Cardinals

Last MLB appearance
- June 18, 1907, for the St. Louis Cardinals

MLB statistics
- Batting average: .188
- Home runs: 0
- Runs batted in: 6
- Stats at Baseball Reference

Teams
- St. Louis Cardinals (1907)

John Benedict Kelly (March 13, 1879 – March 19, 1944) was an American Major League Baseball player.

== Sources ==
- Career statistics from Baseball Reference · Baseball Reference (Minors) · Retrosheet · Baseball Almanac
