= Tom Asmussen =

American baseball player

- Catcher
- Born: September 26, 1878; Chicago
- Died: August 21, 1963 (aged 84); Arlington Heights, Illinois
- Batted: Unknown Threw: Right

MLB debut
- August 10, 1907, for the Boston Doves

Last MLB appearance
- August 19, 1907, for the Boston Doves

MLB statistics
- Games played: 2
- At bats: 5
- Hits: 0
- Stats at Baseball Reference

Teams
- Boston Doves (1907)

Thomas William Asmussen (September 26, 1878 – August 21, 1963) was a Major League Baseball catcher. Asmussen played for the Boston Doves in 1907. In 2 career games, he had no hits in 5 at-bats. He threw right-handed and it is not known which hand he batted with.

Asmussen was born in Chicago and died in Arlington Heights, Illinois.
