= Bob Brush (baseball) =

American baseball player (1875-1944)

- First baseman
- Born: March 8, 1875; Osage, Iowa, U.S.
- Died: April 23, 1944 (aged 69); San Bernardino, California, U.S.
- Batted: Unknown Threw: Unknown

MLB debut
- April 20, 1907, for the Boston Doves

Last MLB appearance
- April 23, 1907, for the Boston Doves

MLB statistics
- Games played: 2
- At bats: 2
- Hits: 0
- Stats at Baseball Reference

Teams
- Boston Doves (1907)

Robert Brush (March 8, 1875 – April 23, 1944) was an American Major League Baseball (MLB) catcher. He played for the Boston Doves in 1907.
