= Ernie Lindemann =

American baseball player (1883-1951)

- Pitcher
- Born: Ernest Theodore Lindemann; June 10, 1883; New York City, New York, U.S.
- Died: December 27, 1951 (aged 68); Brooklyn, New York, U.S.
- Batted: Right Threw: Right

MLB debut
- June 28, 1907, for the Boston Doves

Last MLB appearance
- June 28, 1907, for the Boston Doves

MLB statistics
- Win–loss record: 0–0
- Strikeouts: 3
- Earned run average: 5.68
- Stats at Baseball Reference

Teams
- Boston Doves (1907)

Ernest Theodore Lindemann (June 10, 1883 – December 27, 1951) was an American professional baseball player who played in 1907.

Lindemann had a long, successful semi-professional baseball career in the New York metropolitan area and was described in The Brooklyn Daily Eagle as "[o]ne of the greatest semi-pro pitchers of the 1900's." He was believed to have recorded more than 600 pitching wins, including victories against Dummy Taylor, Andy Coakley and Hall of Famer Rube Waddell.

He was the subject of contract disputes between independent baseball executive Nat Strong, Brooklyn Dodgers owner Charles Ebbets and New York Yankees owner Frank J. Farrell. The big league owners tried to pressure Strong into cancelling games in which Lindemann was scheduled to pitch.
