= Oscar Westerberg =

American baseball player (1882-1909)

- Shortstop
- Born: July 8, 1882; Alameda, California, U.S.
- Died: September 7, 1909 (aged 27); Alameda, California, U.S.
- Batted: Both Threw: Right

MLB debut
- September 5, 1907, for the Boston Doves

Last MLB appearance
- September 7, 1907, for the Boston Doves

MLB statistics
- Batting average: .333
- Home runs: 0
- RBI: 1
- Stats at Baseball Reference

Teams
- Boston Doves (1907)

Oscar William Westerberg (July 8, 1882, Alameda, California – April 17, 1909, Alameda, California) was an American Major League Baseball shortstop who played for the Boston Doves in 1907.

Prior to playing professionally, he attended Saint Mary's College of California.

He made his debut on September 5, 1907, and played his final game on September 7, 1907. In that time, he appeared in two games, collecting two hits in six at-bats for a .333 batting average. He also handled six chances in the field without committing any errors.

Westerberg also played at least four seasons in the minors. In 31 games in 1908, he hit only .131 for the New Haven Blues and Trenton Tigers.

Following his death, he was interred at Mountain View Cemetery in Oakland, California.
