= Joe Knotts =

American baseball player (1884-1950)

- Catcher
- Born: March 3, 1884; Greensboro, Pennsylvania, U.S.
- Died: September 15, 1950 (aged 66); Philadelphia, Pennsylvania, U.S.
- Batted: Right Threw: Right

MLB debut
- September 18, 1907, for the Boston Doves

Last MLB appearance
- September 28, 1907, for the Boston Doves

MLB statistics
- Games played: 3
- At bats: 8
- Hits: 0
- Stats at Baseball Reference

Teams
- Boston Doves (1907)

Joseph Steven Knotts (March 3, 1884 – September 15, 1950) was an American Major League Baseball catcher. He played for the Boston Doves in 1907.
