= Bill Otey =

American baseball player (1886–1931)

- Pitcher
- Born: December 16, 1886; Dayton, Ohio
- Died: April 22, 1931 (aged 44); Dayton, Ohio
- Batted: Left Threw: Left

MLB debut
- September 27, 1907, for the Pittsburgh Pirates

Last MLB appearance
- June 24, 1911, for the Washington Senators

MLB statistics
- Win–loss record: 1-5
- Earned run average: 5.01
- Strikeouts: 33
- Stats at Baseball Reference

Teams
- Pittsburgh Pirates (1907); Washington Senators (1910–1911)

William Tilford Otey (December 16, 1886 – April 22, 1931) was a left-handed pitcher in Major League Baseball. He played for the Pittsburgh Pirates and Washington Senators.
