= Cy Malis =

American baseball player (1907-1971)

- Pitcher
- Born: February 26, 1907; Philadelphia, Pennsylvania, U.S.
- Died: January 12, 1971 (aged 63); North Hollywood, California, U.S.
- Batted: Right Threw: Right

MLB debut
- August 17, 1934, for the Philadelphia Phillies

Last MLB appearance
- August 17, 1934, for the Philadelphia Phillies

MLB statistics
- Games pitched: 1
- Innings pitched: 3 2/3
- Win–loss record: 0–0
- Earned run average: 4.91
- Strikeouts: 1
- Stats at Baseball Reference

Teams
- Philadelphia Phillies (1934)

Cyrus Sol Malis (February 26, 1907 – January 12, 1971) was an American Major League Baseball pitcher who played in one game for the Philadelphia Phillies on August 17, 1934. He was born in Philadelphia, Pennsylvania, where he attended Brown Prep, and was Jewish.

== Baseball career ==
Malis pitched 3 2/3 innings for the Phillies, and gave up two earned runs. He ended his career with a 4.91 ERA (104 ERA+ on the season). He walked two batters as well. On defense, he made one putout, zero errors or assists, giving him a career fielding percentage of 1.000. In addition to a perfect fielding percentage, he was hit by a pitch in his only plate appearance to give him a perfect on-base percentage.

== Acting Career ==
Malis was a screen and television actor for 24 years.
