= Frank Barberich =

American baseball player (1882–1965)

- Pitcher
- Born: February 3, 1882; Newtown, New York, U.S.
- Died: May 1, 1965 (aged 83); Ocala, Florida, U.S.
- Batted: Both Threw: Right

MLB debut
- September 17, 1907, for the Boston Doves

Last MLB appearance
- June 16, 1910, for the Boston Red Sox

MLB statistics
- Win–loss record: 1–1
- Earned run average: 6.23
- Strikeouts: 1
- Stats at Baseball Reference

Teams
- Boston Doves (1907); Boston Red Sox (1910)

Frank Frederick Barberich (February 3, 1882 – May 1, 1965) was an American pitcher in Major League Baseball who played for the Boston Doves (1907) and Boston Red Sox (1910). Barberich was a switch-hitter and threw right-handed.
