= Tom Needham =

American baseball player (1879–1926)

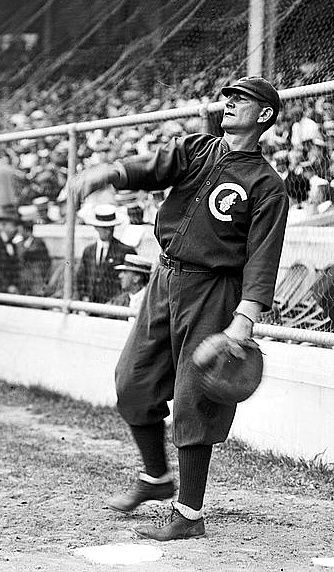
- Tom Needham in November 1913
- Catcher
- Born: April 17, 1879; Ireland
- Died: December 14, 1926 (aged 47); Steubenville, Ohio, U.S.
- Batted: Right Threw: Right

MLB debut
- May 12, 1904, for the Boston Beaneaters

Last MLB appearance
- July 8, 1914, for the Chicago Cubs

MLB statistics
- Batting average: .209
- Home runs: 8
- Runs batted in: 117
- Stats at Baseball Reference

Teams
- Boston Beaneaters / Doves (1904–1907); New York Giants (1908); Chicago Cubs (1909–1914)

Thomas Joseph Needham (April 17, 1879 – December 14, 1926) was an American professional baseball player who played in the major leagues from 1904 to 1914. He was a catcher with the Boston Beaneaters, New York Giants and Chicago Cubs. Needham hit poorly, hitting below .200 in 8 of his 11 seasons, Needham's career average was .209, due to his first season average of .260. Needham died in his home in Steubenville, Ohio at the age of 47.

== Career ==
Born in Ireland, Needham lived in Steubenville, Ohio, by his teens. He played baseball there before spending a few seasons in the minor leagues.

Needham was signed in late 1903 by the Boston Beaneaters, and he made his major-league debut with them in 1904. Needham achieved career highs in several offensive categories during the 84 games he played in that first season: he tallied 70 hits, including 12 doubles, and he had a .260 batting average. He stayed with Boston for three more years, playing between 83 and 86 games each season.

After playing for the New York Giants in 1908, Needham was purchased from the Giants by the St. Paul Saints of the minor league American Association, who then traded him to the Chicago Cubs for Fred Liese before the 1909 season. This seemed to be a good opportunity for Needham, as Cubs catcher Johnny Kling was sitting out the 1909 season to pursue pool playing. However, Chicago drafted Jimmy Archer from the Buffalo Bisons, and Archer became the Cubs starting catcher. Needham hit over .200 only once and never appeared in more than 33 games in any of his six seasons with the Cubs.

Needham, who had served as a player-coach in his last couple of seasons with the Cubs, managed the Newark Bears of the International League in 1917. He later served as a pitching coach for the Chicago White Sox and was involved in starting up two minor leagues in Ohio.

== Death ==
In early December 1926, Needham suffered a stroke. He was taken to Ohio Valley Hospital, where staff members felt that his stroke was too severe to respond to any treatment, so he was taken back home to die. He died on December 14, 1926. He was survived by his wife and two children.
