= Jake Boultes =

American baseball player (1884-1955)

- Pitcher
- Born: August 6, 1884; St. Louis, Missouri, US
- Died: December 24, 1955 (aged 71); St. Louis, Missouri, US
- Batted: Right Threw: Right

MLB debut
- April 18, 1907, for the Boston Doves

Last MLB appearance
- June 24, 1909, for the Boston Doves

MLB statistics
- Win–loss record: 8–14
- Earned run average: 2.96
- Strikeouts: 78
- Stats at Baseball Reference

Teams
- Boston Doves (1907–1909)

Jacob John Boultes (August 6, 1884 – December 24, 1955) was an American professional baseball player of the early twentieth century. He played three seasons (1907–1909) for the Boston Doves, mostly as a pitcher although he also played a handful of games as a position player in 1907. In 42 games, Boultes had a record of 8 wins and 14 losses with an ERA of 2.96.
