= Jim Ball (baseball) =

American baseball player (1884-1963)

James Chandler Ball
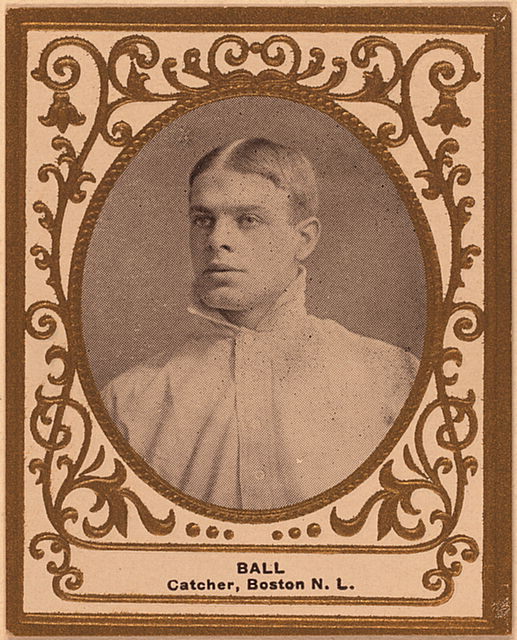
- Catcher
- Born: February 22, 1884; Harford County, Maryland, U.S.
- Died: April 7, 1963 (aged 79); Glendale, California, U.S.
- Batted: Right Threw: Right

MLB debut
- September 21, 1907, for the Boston Doves

Last MLB appearance
- October 21, 1908, for the Boston Doves

MLB statistics
- At bats: 51
- RBI: 3
- Batting average: .137
- Stats at Baseball Reference

Teams
- Boston Doves (1907–1908)

James Chandler Ball (February 22, 1884 – April 7, 1963) was an American professional baseball player who played in the National League for parts of two season spanning 1907–1908. Born in Harford County, Maryland, he was drafted by the Boston Doves from the Baltimore Orioles of the Eastern League in the 1907 rule 5 draft and played in 10 games that season. He was released from the Doves in January 1908. On August 22, 1908, his contract was later purchased by the Boston Doves from the Baltimore and played in 6 games that season.
