= Del Howard =

American baseball player (1877–1956)

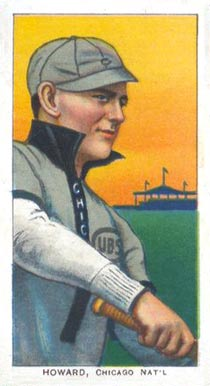
- Outfielder / Infielder
- Born: December 24, 1877; Kenney, Illinois, U.S.
- Died: December 24, 1956 (aged 79); Seattle, Washington, U.S.
- Batted: Left Threw: Right

MLB debut
- April 15, 1905, for the Pittsburgh Pirates

Last MLB appearance
- October 6, 1909, for the Chicago Cubs

MLB statistics
- Batting average: .263
- Home runs: 6
- Runs batted in: 193
- Stats at Baseball Reference

Teams
- Pittsburgh Pirates (1905); Boston Beaneaters / Doves (1906–1907); Chicago Cubs (1907–1909)

Career highlights and awards
- 2× World Series champion (1907, 1908)

George Elmer "Del" Howard (December 24, 1877 – December 24, 1956) was an American Major League Baseball player from 1905 to 1909. He would play for the Pittsburgh Pirates, Boston Beaneaters/Doves, and Chicago Cubs. Howard appeared in 536 games and retired with six home runs, 193 runs batted in and a lifetime .263 batting average.

He had a career-high 142 hits for Boston during the 1906 season. Howard then played for the Cubs in both the 1907 and 1908 World Series, winning two championships.
