= Johnny Scalzi =

American baseball player (1907-1962)

- Second baseman / Pinch hitter / Pinch runner
- Born: March 22, 1907; Stamford, Connecticut
- Died: September 27, 1962 (aged 55); Port Chester, New York
- Batted: Right Threw: Right

MLB debut
- June 19, 1931, for the Boston Braves

Last MLB appearance
- June 24, 1931, for the Boston Braves

MLB statistics
- Batting average: .000
- Home runs: 0
- Runs batted in: 0
- Games played: 2
- Stats at Baseball Reference

Teams
- Boston Braves (1931)

John Anthony Scalzi (March 22, 1907 – September 27, 1962) was a Major League Baseball player. He played one season with the Boston Braves between June 19 and 24, 1931. He also played seven games for the Brooklyn Dodgers of the NFL in 1931.

After serving as President of the Colonial League, Scalzi was serving as a scout for the New York Mets when he was killed in a car accident near Port Chester, New York.

Scalzi Park, the largest recreational area within his home city of Stamford, Connecticut, is named after him.
