= Bill Sweeney (infielder) =

American baseball player (1886–1948)

- Infielder
- Born: March 6, 1886; Covington, Kentucky, U.S.
- Died: May 26, 1948 (aged 62); Cambridge, Massachusetts, U.S.
- Batted: Right Threw: Right

MLB debut
- June 14, 1907, for the Chicago Cubs

Last MLB appearance
- October 4, 1914, for the Chicago Cubs

MLB statistics
- Batting average: .272
- Hits: 1004
- Runs batted in: 388
- Stolen bases: 172
- Stats at Baseball Reference

Teams
- Chicago Cubs (1907); Boston Doves/Rustlers/Braves (1907–1913); Chicago Cubs (1914)

William John Sweeney (March 6, 1886 – May 26, 1948) was an American infielder in Major League Baseball from 1907 to 1914. He graduated from St. Xavier High School in Cincinnati in 1904.

In an eight-year major-league career, he compiled a .272 batting average (1,004-3,692) with 442 runs scored, 11 home runs, 388 RBI, 172 stolen bases, an on-base percentage of .349 and a slugging percentage of .344. His best seasons were with the Boston Braves in 1911 and 1912, he hit .314 and .344 with 63 and 99 RBI respectively.

== See also ==
- List of Major League Baseball career stolen bases leaders
