= Frank Burke (baseball) =

American baseball player (1880-1946)

- Outfielder
- Born: February 16, 1880; Carbon County, Pennsylvania, U.S.
- Died: September 17, 1946 (aged 66); Los Angeles, California, U.S.
- Batted: Unknown Threw: Right

MLB debut
- September 14, 1906, for the New York Giants

Last MLB appearance
- July 31, 1907, for the Boston Doves

MLB statistics
- AVG: .188
- H: 26
- RBI: 9
- Stats at Baseball Reference

Teams
- New York Giants (1906); Boston Doves (1907)

Frank Aloysius Burke (February 16, 1880 – September 17, 1946) was an American professional baseball player who played two seasons in the major leagues. Born in Carbon County, Pennsylvania, Burke played for the New York Giants and the Boston Doves. He died in Los Angeles in 1946. He was interred at Holy Cross Cemetery in Culver City, California.
