= 1907 Major League Baseball season =

1907 MLB season
- League: American League (AL); National League (NL)
- Sport: Baseball
- Duration: Regular season: April 11 – October 6, 1907; World Series: October 8–12, 1907
- Games: 154
- Teams: 16 (8 per league)

Pennant winners
- AL champions: Detroit Tigers
- AL runners-up: Philadelphia Athletics
- NL champions: Chicago Cubs
- NL runners-up: Pittsburgh Pirates

World Series
- Champions: Chicago Cubs
- Runners-up: Detroit Tigers

MLB seasons
- ← 1906 1908 →

Locations of teams for the 1904–1907 American League seasons
American League
Locations of teams for the 1907–1908 National League seasons
National League

The 1907 major league baseball season began on April 11, 1907. The regular season ended on October 6, with the Chicago Cubs and Detroit Tigers as regular season champions of the National League and American League, respectively. The postseason began with Game 1 of the fourth modern World Series on October 8 and ended with Game 5 on October 12. The Cubs defeated the Tigers, four games to none (with one tie), capturing their first championship in franchise history. Going into the season, the defending World Series champions were the Chicago White Sox from the 1906 season.

The Boston Beaneaters renamed as the Boston Doves.

== Schedule ==
The 1907 schedule consisted of 154 games for all teams in the American League and National League, each of which had eight teams. Each team was scheduled to play 22 games against the other seven teams of their respective league. This continued the format put in place for the 1904 season. This format would last until 1919.

Opening Day took place on April 11 with all but the Brooklyn Superbas and Boston Doves playing. The final day of the regular season was on October 6. The World Series took place between October 8 and October 12.

== Teams ==
League	Team	City	Ballpark	Capacity	Manager
American League	Boston Americans	Boston, Massachusetts	Huntington Avenue Grounds	11,500	Cy Young
American League	Boston Americans	Boston, Massachusetts	Huntington Avenue Grounds	11,500	George Huff
American League	Boston Americans	Boston, Massachusetts	Huntington Avenue Grounds	11,500	Bob Unglaub
American League	Boston Americans	Boston, Massachusetts	Huntington Avenue Grounds	11,500	Deacon McGuire
American League	Chicago White Sox	Chicago, Illinois	South Side Park	15,000	Fielder Jones
American League	Cleveland Naps	Cleveland, Ohio	League Park (Cleveland)	9,000	Nap Lajoie
American League	Detroit Tigers	Detroit, Michigan	Bennett Park	8,500	Hughie Jennings
American League	New York Highlanders	New York, New York	Hilltop Park	16,000	Clark Griffith
American League	Philadelphia Athletics	Philadelphia, Pennsylvania	Columbia Park	13,600	Connie Mack
American League	St. Louis Browns	St. Louis, Missouri	Sportsman's Park	8,000	Jimmy McAleer
American League	Washington Senators	Washington, D.C.	National Park	9,000	Joe Cantillon
National League	Boston Doves	Boston, Massachusetts	South End Grounds	6,600	Fred Tenney
National League	Brooklyn Superbas	New York, New York	Washington Park	12,000	Patsy Donovan
National League	Chicago Cubs	Chicago, Illinois	West Side Park	14,200	Frank Chance
National League	Cincinnati Reds	Cincinnati, Ohio	Palace of the Fans	12,000	Ned Hanlon
National League	New York Giants	New York, New York	Polo Grounds	16,000	John McGraw
National League	Philadelphia Phillies	Philadelphia, Pennsylvania	National League Park	18,000	Billy Murray
National League	Pittsburgh Pirates	Pittsburgh, Pennsylvania	Exposition Park	16,000	Fred Clarke
National League	St. Louis Cardinals	St. Louis, Missouri	League Park (St. Louis)	15,200	John McCloskey

== Standings ==
=== American League ===
American League
Team	W	L	Pct.	GB	Home	Road
Detroit Tigers	92	58	.613	—	50‍–‍27	42‍–‍31
Philadelphia Athletics	88	57	.607	1½	50‍–‍20	38‍–‍37
Chicago White Sox	87	64	.576	5½	48‍–‍29	39‍–‍35
Cleveland Naps	85	67	.559	8	46‍–‍31	39‍–‍36
New York Highlanders	70	78	.473	21	32‍–‍41	38‍–‍37
St. Louis Browns	69	83	.454	24	36‍–‍40	33‍–‍43
Boston Americans	59	90	.396	32½	34‍–‍41	25‍–‍49
Washington Senators	49	102	.325	43½	26‍–‍48	23‍–‍54

=== National League ===
National League
Team	W	L	Pct.	GB	Home	Road
Chicago Cubs	107	45	.704	—	54‍–‍19	53‍–‍26
Pittsburgh Pirates	91	63	.591	17	47‍–‍29	44‍–‍34
Philadelphia Phillies	83	64	.565	21½	45‍–‍30	38‍–‍34
New York Giants	82	71	.536	25½	45‍–‍30	37‍–‍41
Brooklyn Superbas	65	83	.439	40	37‍–‍38	28‍–‍45
Cincinnati Reds	66	87	.431	41½	43‍–‍36	23‍–‍51
Boston Doves	58	90	.392	47	31‍–‍42	27‍–‍48
St. Louis Cardinals	52	101	.340	55½	31‍–‍47	21‍–‍54

=== Tie games ===
30 tie games (18 in AL, 12 in NL), which are not factored into winning percentage or games behind (and were often replayed again), occurred throughout the season.

==== American League ====
- Boston Americans, 6
- Chicago White Sox, 6
- Cleveland Naps, 6
- Detroit Tigers, 3
- New York Highlanders, 4
- Philadelphia Athletics, 5
- St. Louis Browns, 3
- Washington Senators, 3

==== National League ====
- Boston Doves, 4
- Brooklyn Superbas, 5
- Chicago Cubs, 3
- Cincinnati Reds, 3
- New York Giants, 2
- Philadelphia Phillies, 2
- Pittsburgh Pirates, 3
- St. Louis Cardinals, 2

== Postseason ==
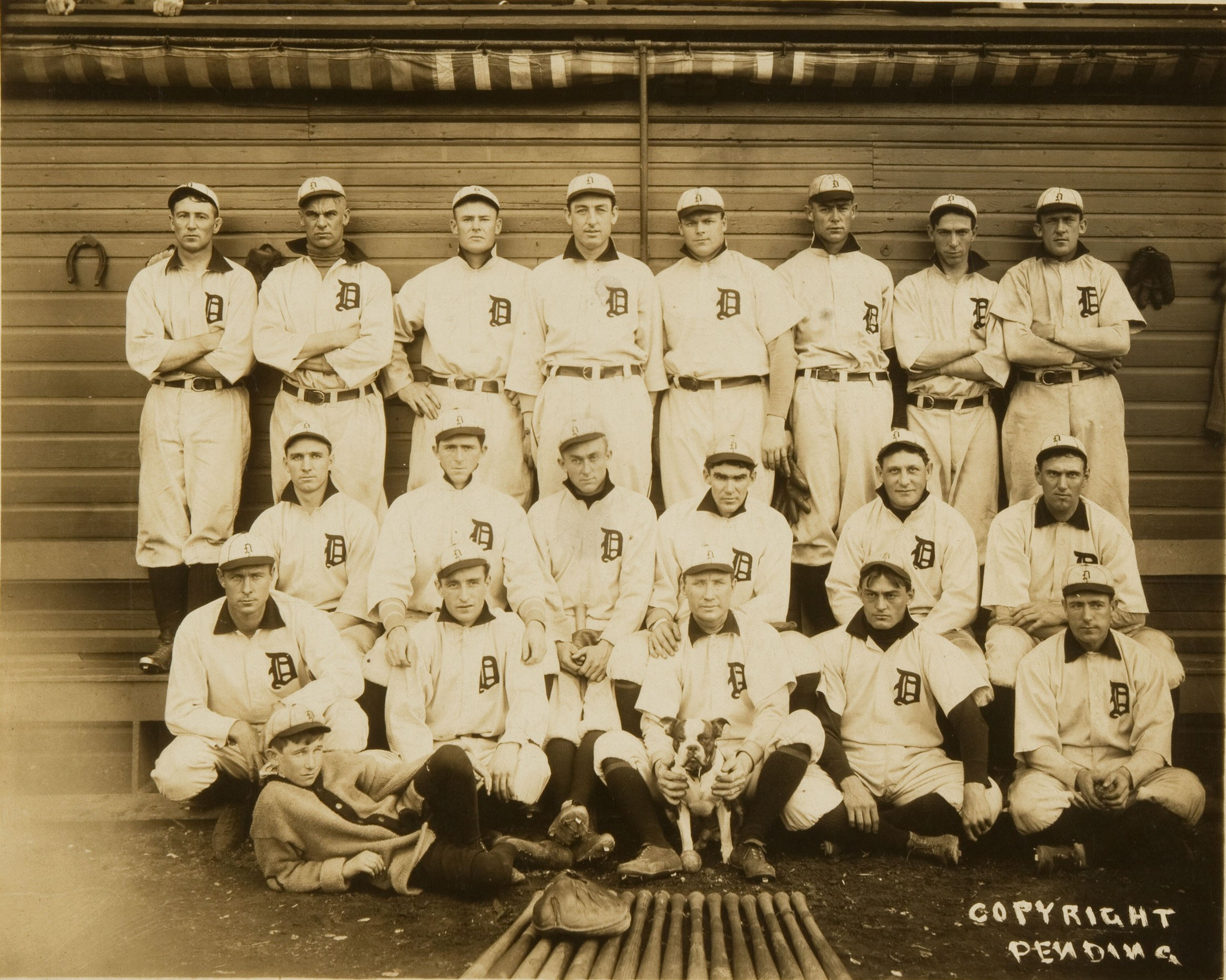
Team picture of the Detroit Tigers, American League champions.

The postseason began on October 8 and ended on October 12 with the Chicago Cubs defeating the Detroit Tigers in the 1907 World Series in five games (one of which being a tie).

=== Bracket ===
World Series
AL	Detroit Tigers	0
NL	Chicago Cubs	4

Note: Game 1 ended in a tie.

== Managerial changes ==
=== Off-season ===
Team	Former Manager	New Manager
Boston Americans	Chick Stahl	Cy Young
Detroit Tigers	Bill Armour	Hughie Jennings
Philadelphia Phillies	Hugh Duffy	Billy Murray
Washington Senators	Jake Stahl	Joe Cantillon

=== In-season ===
Team	Former Manager	New Manager
Boston Americans	Cy Young	George Huff
Boston Americans	George Huff	Bob Unglaub
Boston Americans	Bob Unglaub	Deacon McGuire

== League leaders ==
Any team shown in small text indicates a previous team a player was on during the season.

=== American League ===
Hitting leaders
Stat	Player	Total
AVG	Ty Cobb (DET)	.350
OPS	Ty Cobb (DET)	.848
HR	Harry Davis (PHA)	8
RBI	Ty Cobb (DET)	119
R	Sam Crawford (DET)	102
H	Ty Cobb (DET)	212
SB	Ty Cobb (DET)	53

Pitching leaders
Stat	Player	Total
W	Addie Joss (CLE); Doc White (CWS)	27
L	Al Orth (NYH); Barney Pelty (SLB)	21
ERA	Ed Walsh (CWS)	1.60
K	Rube Waddell (PHA)	232
IP	Ed Walsh (CWS)	422.1
SV	Bill Dinneen (SLB/BOS); Tom Hughes (WSH); Ed Walsh (CWS)	4
WHIP	Cy Young (BOS)	0.982

=== National League ===
Hitting leaders
Stat	Player	Total
AVG	Honus Wagner (PIT)	.350
OPS	Honus Wagner (PIT)	.921
HR	Dave Brain (BSN)	10
RBI	Sherry Magee (PHI)	85
R	Spike Shannon (NYG)	104
H	Ginger Beaumont (BSN)	187
SB	Honus Wagner (PIT)	61

Pitching leaders
Stat	Player	Total
W	Christy Mathewson (NYG)	24
L	Stoney McGlynn (STL)	25
ERA	Jack Pfiester (CHC)	1.15
K	Christy Mathewson (NYG)	178
IP	Stoney McGlynn (STL)	352.1
SV	Stoney McGlynn (STL)	4
WHIP	Mordecai Brown (CHC)	0.944

== Milestones ==
=== Batters ===
==== Cycles ====
- Johnny Bates (BSN):
  - Bates hit for his first cycle and third in franchise history, on April 26 against the Brooklyn Superbas.

=== Pitchers ===
==== No-hitters ====
- Big Jeff Pfeffer (BSN):
  - Pfeffer threw his first career no-hitter and the third no-hitter in franchise history, by defeating the Cincinnati Reds 6–0 on May 8. Pfeffer walked one, hit one batter by pitch, and struck out three.
- Nick Maddox (PIT):
  - Maddox threw his first career no-hitter and the first no-hitter in franchise history, by defeating the Brooklyn Superbas 2–1 on September 20. Maddox walked three, hit one batter by pitch, and struck out five.

=== Miscellaneous ===
- Washington Senators:
  - Set a Major League record for most stolen bases in a single game, stealing 13 bases on June 28 in a game defeating the New York Highlanders 16–5.
- Philadelphia Phillies:
  - Set a Major League record for the fewest at bats by a team in a season at 4,725.

== Home field attendance ==
Team name	Wins	%±	Home attendance	%±	Per game
Chicago White Sox	87	-6.5%	666,307	13.9%	8,434
Philadelphia Athletics	88	12.8%	625,581	27.9%	8,570
New York Giants	82	-14.6%	538,350	33.6%	6,992
Boston Americans	59	20.4%	436,777	6.5%	5,600
Chicago Cubs	107	-7.8%	422,550	-35.4%	5,560
St. Louis Browns	69	-9.2%	419,025	7.7%	5,513
Cleveland Naps	85	-4.5%	382,046	17.3%	4,659
New York Highlanders	70	-22.2%	350,020	-19.5%	4,667
Philadelphia Phillies	83	16.9%	341,216	15.8%	4,550
Pittsburgh Pirates	91	-2.2%	319,506	-19.1%	4,149
Cincinnati Reds	66	3.1%	317,500	-3.8%	3,920
Brooklyn Superbas	65	-1.5%	312,500	12.7%	4,058
Detroit Tigers	92	29.6%	297,079	70.7%	3,760
Washington Senators	49	-10.9%	221,929	70.8%	2,959
Boston Doves	58	18.4%	203,221	41.8%	2,746
St. Louis Cardinals	52	0.0%	185,377	-34.7%	2,347

== See also ==
- 1907 in baseball (Events, Births, Deaths)
