= Newt Randall =

Canadian baseball player (1880–1955)

- Outfielder
- Born: February 3, 1880; New Lowell, Ontario, Canada
- Died: May 3, 1955 (aged 75); Duluth, Minnesota, U.S.
- Batted: Right Threw: Right

MLB debut
- April 18, 1907, for the Chicago Cubs

Last MLB appearance
- October 5, 1907, for the Boston Doves

MLB statistics
- Batting average: .211
- Home runs: 0
- Runs batted in: 19
- Stats at Baseball Reference

Teams
- Chicago Cubs (1907); Boston Doves (1907)

Newton John Randall (February 3, 1880 – May 3, 1955) was a Canadian outfielder in Major League Baseball. He played for the Chicago Cubs and Boston Doves in 1907.
