= Billy Klusman =

American baseball player (1865–1907)

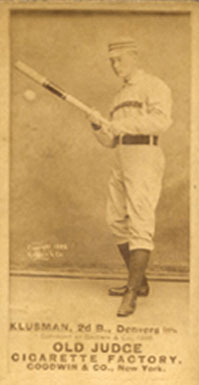
- Second baseman
- Born: March 24, 1865; Cincinnati, Ohio, U.S.
- Died: June 24, 1907 (aged 42); Cincinnati, Ohio, U.S.
- Batted: Right Threw: Right

MLB debut
- June 21, 1888, for the Boston Beaneaters

Last MLB appearance
- May 9, 1890, for the St. Louis Browns

MLB statistics
- Batting average: .209
- Home runs: 3
- Runs batted in: 22
- Stats at Baseball Reference

Teams
- Boston Beaneaters (1888); St. Louis Browns (1890)

William F. Klusman (March 24, 1865 – June 24, 1907) was a 19th-century American Major League Baseball second baseman. He played with the Boston Beaneaters of the National League in 1888 and the St. Louis Browns of the American Association in 1890. He was playing in the minor leagues as late as 1898.
