= Earl Clark (baseball) =

American baseball player (1907-1938)

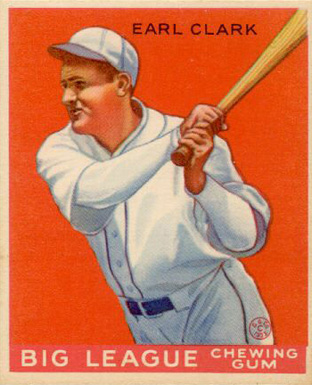
- Earl Clark 1933 Goudey baseball card
- Outfielder
- Born: November 6, 1907; Washington, D.C., U.S.
- Died: January 16, 1938 (aged 30); Washington, D.C., U.S.
- Batted: Right Threw: Right

MLB debut
- August 17, 1927, for the Boston Braves

Last MLB appearance
- May 25, 1934, for the St. Louis Browns

MLB statistics
- Batting average: .291
- Home runs: 4
- Runs batted in: 81
- Stats at Baseball Reference

Teams
- Boston Braves (1927–1933); St. Louis Browns (1934)

Bailey Earl Clark (November 6, 1907 – January 16, 1938) was an American outfielder in Major League Baseball who played from 1927 through 1934, for the Boston Braves (1927–33) and St. Louis Browns (1934). Listed at 5 feet 10 inches (1.78 m), 160 pounds (73 kg), Clark batted and threw right handed. He was born in Washington, D.C.

Clark set the major league record for putouts by an outfielder in a 9-inning game, with twelve on May 10, 1929. The feat has only been equalled twice; by Lyman Bostock in 1977, and by Jacoby Ellsbury in 2009.

In an eight-year career, Clark posted an average of .291 (240-for-826) with four home runs and 81 runs batted in in 293 games, including 122 runs scored and a .324 on-base percentage.

Clark died at the age of 30 in 1938, when his automobile collided with a streetcar in Washington, D.C.
