= Vive Lindaman =

American baseball player

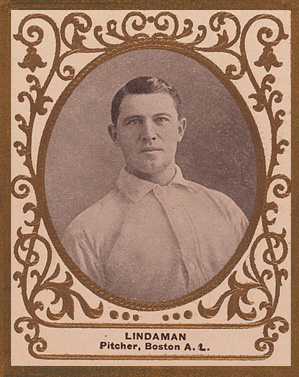
- Pitcher
- Born: October 28, 1877; Charles City, Iowa, U.S.
- Died: February 13, 1927 (aged 49); Charles City, Iowa, U.S.
- Batted: Right Threw: Right

MLB debut
- April 14, 1906, for the Boston Beaneaters

Last MLB appearance
- July 7, 1909, for the Boston Doves

MLB statistics
- Win–loss record: 36-60
- Earned run average: 2.92
- Strikeouts: 286
- Stats at Baseball Reference

Teams
- Boston Beaneaters/Doves (1906–09)

Vivan Alexander Lindaman (October 28, 1877 – February 13, 1927) was an American professional baseball player who played pitcher in the Major Leagues from 1906 to 1909.

Lindaman went 24–7 for the Eastern League's Jersey City Skeeters in 1905, and he made his major league debut the following season. In his first start with the Boston Beaneaters, he shut out Brooklyn 1–0. Despite throwing 32 complete games (third in the league) as a rookie, he finished 12–23; his team was shut out in eight of his losses.

Lindaman kept in shape by walking 17 miles a day as a mail carrier.
