= Izzy Hoffman =

American baseball player (1875-1942)

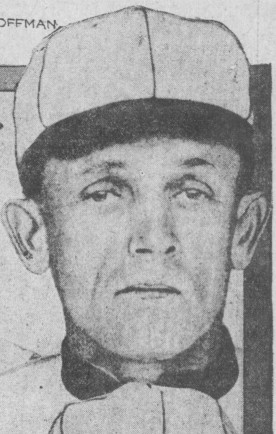
- Outfielder
- Born: January 5, 1875; Bridgeport, New Jersey, U.S.
- Died: November 13, 1942 (aged 67); Philadelphia, Pennsylvania, U.S.
- Batted: Left Threw: Left

MLB debut
- April 14, 1904, for the Washington Senators

Last MLB appearance
- October 5, 1907, for the Boston Doves

MLB statistics
- Batting average: .233
- Home runs: 0
- Runs batted in: 4
- Stats at Baseball Reference

Teams
- Washington Senators (1904); Boston Doves (1907)

Harry C. Hoffman (January 5, 1875 – November 13, 1942) was an American Major League Baseball outfielder who played for the Washington Senators in 1904 and the Boston Doves in 1907.
