= Dave Brain =

American baseball player (1879–1959)

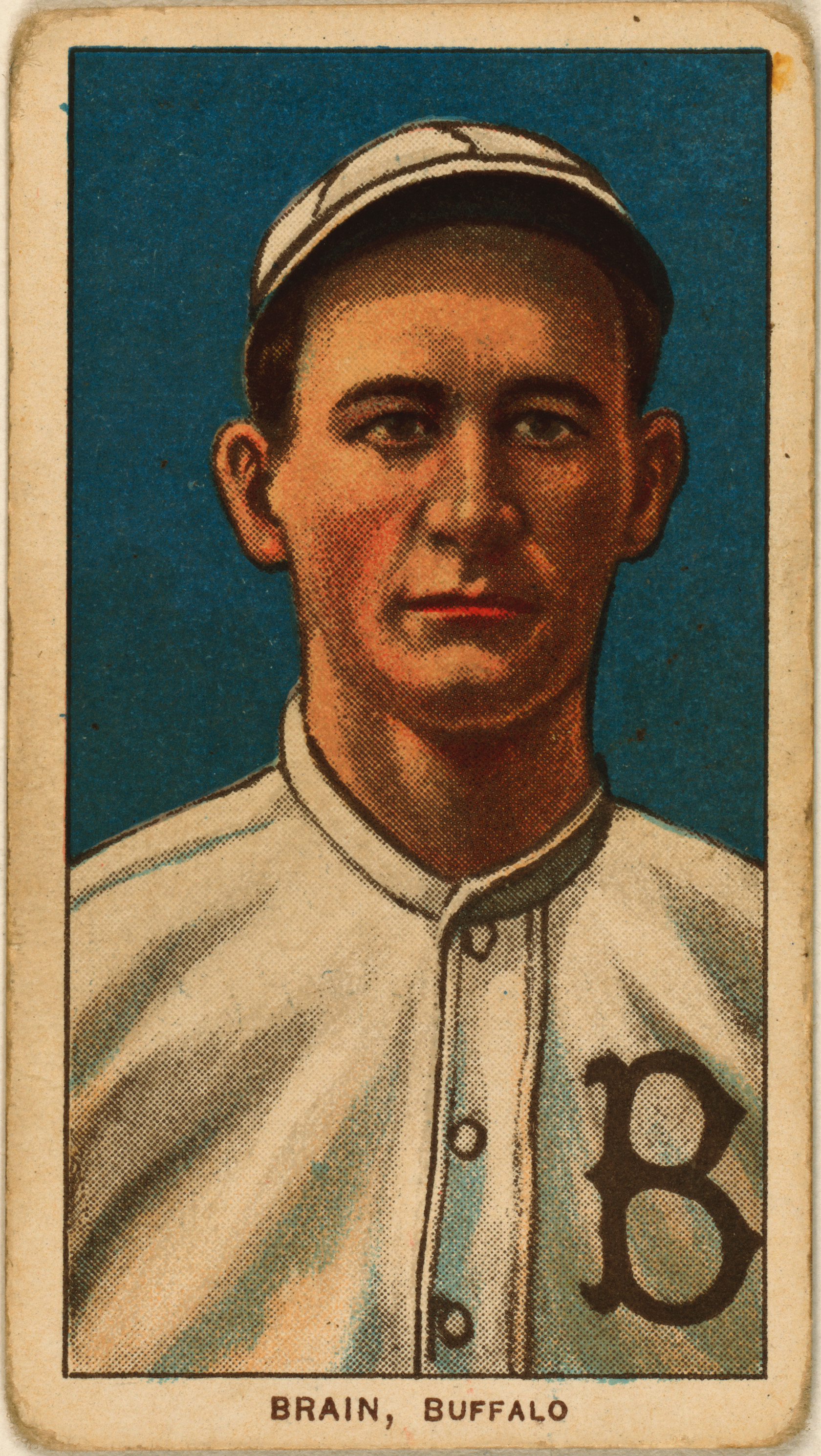
- Third baseman / Shortstop
- Born: January 24, 1879; Hereford, England
- Died: May 25, 1959 (aged 80); Los Angeles, California, U.S.
- Batted: Right Threw: Right

MLB debut
- April 24, 1901, for the Chicago White Sox

Last MLB appearance
- October 7, 1908, for the New York Giants

MLB statistics
- Batting average: .252
- Home runs: 27
- Runs batted in: 303
- Stats at Baseball Reference

Teams
- Chicago White Sox (1901); St. Louis Cardinals (1903–1905); Pittsburgh Pirates (1905); Boston Beaneaters / Doves (1906–1907); Cincinnati Reds (1908); New York Giants (1908)

Career highlights and awards
- NL home run leader (1907)

David Leonard Brain (January 24, 1879 – May 25, 1959) was an American professional baseball infielder and outfielder who played for the Chicago White Sox (1901), St. Louis Cardinals (1903–1905), Pittsburgh Pirates (1905), Boston Beaneaters/Doves (1906–1907), Cincinnati Reds (1908) and New York Giants (1908). Brain batted and threw right-handed. He was born in Hereford, England.

Brain was an unreliable fielder who showed some power with his bat and good speed on the basepaths. In 1903 for the St. Louis Cardinals he stole 21 bases and hit 15 triples, including two three-triple games to become the only player in National League history to perform the feat twice in a season. But his accomplishments were overshadowed by his 67 errors – 41 at shortstop and 22 at third base.

In 1904 Brain played around the infield, hitting 24 doubles with 12 triples and 18 stolen bases, and also posted a career-high with 72 runs batted in. In 1905 he divided his playing time between St. Louis and the Pittsburgh Pirates, and played the next two seasons with the Boston teams of the National League. Brain led the league with 10 home runs in 1907 at age 28, but the following season was his last; Brain appeared in 27 games with the Cincinnati Reds and New York Giants while hitting no home runs.

In a seven-season career, Brain was a .252 hitter with 27 home runs and 303 RBI in 679 games.

Brain died in Los Angeles, California, at the age of 80.

== See also ==
- List of Major League Baseball annual home run leaders
