= 1907 in baseball =

The following are the baseball events of the year 1907 throughout the world.

== Champions ==
- World Series: Chicago Cubs over Detroit Tigers (4–0–1)

== Statistical leaders ==
	American League		National League	
Stat	Player	Total	Player	Total
AVG	Ty Cobb (DET)	.350	Honus Wagner (PIT)	.350
HR	Harry Davis (PHA)	8	Dave Brain (BSN)	10
RBI	Ty Cobb (DET)	119	Sherry Magee (PHI)	85
W	Addie Joss (CLE); Doc White (CWS)	27	Christy Mathewson (NYG)	24
ERA	Ed Walsh (CWS)	1.60	Jack Pfiester (CHC)	1.15
K	Rube Waddell (PHA)	232	Christy Mathewson (NYG)	178

== Major league baseball final standings ==
=== American League final standings ===
American League
Team	W	L	Pct.	GB	Home	Road
Detroit Tigers	92	58	.613	—	50‍–‍27	42‍–‍31
Philadelphia Athletics	88	57	.607	1½	50‍–‍20	38‍–‍37
Chicago White Sox	87	64	.576	5½	48‍–‍29	39‍–‍35
Cleveland Naps	85	67	.559	8	46‍–‍31	39‍–‍36
New York Highlanders	70	78	.473	21	32‍–‍41	38‍–‍37
St. Louis Browns	69	83	.454	24	36‍–‍40	33‍–‍43
Boston Americans	59	90	.396	32½	34‍–‍41	25‍–‍49
Washington Senators	49	102	.325	43½	26‍–‍48	23‍–‍54

Locations of teams for the 1904–1907 American League seasons
American League

=== National League final standings ===
National League
Team	W	L	Pct.	GB	Home	Road
Chicago Cubs	107	45	.704	—	54‍–‍19	53‍–‍26
Pittsburgh Pirates	91	63	.591	17	47‍–‍29	44‍–‍34
Philadelphia Phillies	83	64	.565	21½	45‍–‍30	38‍–‍34
New York Giants	82	71	.536	25½	45‍–‍30	37‍–‍41
Brooklyn Superbas	65	83	.439	40	37‍–‍38	28‍–‍45
Cincinnati Reds	66	87	.431	41½	43‍–‍36	23‍–‍51
Boston Doves	58	90	.392	47	31‍–‍42	27‍–‍48
St. Louis Cardinals	52	101	.340	55½	31‍–‍47	21‍–‍54

Locations of teams for the 1907–1908 National League seasons
National League

== Events ==
- February 27 – The New York Highlanders acquire catcher Branch Rickey from the St. Louis Browns in exchange for infielder Joe Yeager. As a condition, Rickey specifies that he will not play on Sundays. Fritz Buelow replaces him on the Browns as their new catcher.
- March 6 – John Rogers and A.J. Reach, owners of the Philadelphia Phillies, are formally acquitted in court from damages from the 1903 Baker Bowl incident. Suit had originally been filed against the owners after a balcony at the stadium collapsed. The collapse left 232 fans injured, and another 12 perished.
- April 11
  - Boston's American League team plays its first game with the name Red Sox. They beat the Philadelphia Athletics, 8–4, at Columbia Park.
  - On Opening Day, New York Giants catcher Roger Bresnahan wears shin guards for the first time in a major league game. The leg guards, usually used in cricket, come in handy, protecting Bresnahan from a fifth-inning foul tip. Other catchers will soon follow Bresnahan's lead and wear similar shin guards.
- April 26 – Boston Doves outfielder Johnny Bates hits for the cycle in a 4–2 Boston victory over the Brooklyn Superbas.
- May 8 – Big Jeff Pfeffer tosses a no-hitter as the Boston Doves defeat the Cincinnati Reds, 6–0.
- May 10 – The Chicago White Sox purchase the contract of First baseman Jake Stahl from the Washington Senators.
- May 21 – The Chicago Cubs defeat the New York Giants 3–0, knocking the Giants out of first place. Giants fans begin to riot and charge the field, anger focused on umpires Hank O'Day and Bob Emslie, who are surrounded and led to safety by players for the Cubs and Giants, while Pinkerton guards fire into the air to keep the crowd at bay.
- June 15 – Lave Cross is released by the Washington Senators.
- June 28 – The last-place Washington Senators steal a record 13 bases off catcher Branch Rickey in a 16–5 victory over New York Highlanders. Rickey, acquired last February from the St. Louis Browns, is pressed into service despite a bad shoulder because of an injury to starting pitcher Red Kleinow. Rickey's first throw to second base ends up in right field and the subsequent tosses are not much better. He almost nips Jim Delahanty on a steal of third base. In his eight innings, relief pitcher King Brockett helps Washington with a deliberate windup. Only pitcher Long Tom Hughes and second baseman Nig Perrine are steal-less, while Hal Chase swipes one for New York.
- August 2 – Walter Johnson made his major league debut with the Washington Senators and lost to the Detroit Tigers, 3–2. The first hit Johnson yielded was a bunt single by Ty Cobb.
- August 11 – In the second game of a doubleheader, shortened by agreement, Ed Karger of the St. Louis Cardinals pitched a seven-inning perfect game, beating the Boston Doves, 4–0.
- September 8 – Future hall of fame inductee Bill McKechnie makes his major league debut, getting one hit in four at bats. It was as a manager, that McKechnie would make his mark, winning four pennants and two World Series titles.
- September 20 – One week after recording a shutout in his major league debut, Pittsburgh Pirates pitcher Nick Maddox hurled a no-hitter against the Brooklyn Superbas in a 2–1 Pirates win. At the age of 20 years and ten months, Maddox becomes (and still is) the youngest pitcher to throw a no-hitter in major league history.
- September 25 – Honus Wagner steals four bases, including second base, third base and home plate in the second inning against the New York Giants. Not to be outdone, his teammate Fred Clarke also swipes four bases for the only time in his career.
- October 9 - In game two of the world series in Chicago, Bill Coughlin, a third baseman with the Detroit Tigers, tags out Jimmy Slagle of the Chicago Cubs using the Hidden Ball Trick. It is the first time this ploy is executed in the world series.
- October 12 – In Game 5 of the World Series the Chicago Cubs would win their first World Championship by defeating the Detroit Tigers, 2–0. The Cubs would take the final four games of the series after Game 1 was declared a tie due to darkness with the score knotted at 3–3 in the 12th inning.
- November 5 – The New York Highlanders purchase the contract of infielder Hobe Ferris from the Boston Americans. Ferris' stay in New York is short as just hours later, he, along with infielder Jimmy Williams, and outfielder Danny Hoffman, are traded to the St. Louis Browns in exchange for Pitcher Fred Glade, outfielder Charlie Hemphill and Outfielder/infielder Harry Niles.
- November 7 – The Tigres del Licey club is founded in the Dominican Republic.
- November 16 – The baseball film How Brown Saw the Baseball Game is released in theatres.

== Births ==
=== January ===
- January 2 – Ted Gullic
- January 2 – Red Kress
- January 14 – Chet Brewer
- January 16 – Buck Jordan
- January 20 – Bob Adams
- January 20 – Jesse Hill
- January 20 – Herm Holshouser
- January 22 – Ivey Shiver
- January 23 – Bobby Burke
- January 25 – Jimmy Adair
- January 25 – Roy Sherid

=== February ===
- February 2 – Jerry Byrne
- February 7 – Bill Steinecke
- February 13 – Wayne LaMaster
- February 17 – Orlin Collier
- February 21 – Snipe Hansen
- February 22 – Dan Dugan
- February 22 – Marty Hopkins
- February 24 – Earl Grace
- February 24 – Bob Seeds
- February 26 – Cy Malis
- February 27 – Hilton Smith

=== March ===
- March 2 – Jack Knott
- March 3 – Jim Tennant
- March 12 – Leroy Matlock
- March 15 – Lou Fette
- March 20 – Vern Kennedy
- March 22 – Johnny Scalzi
- March 24 – Gus Dugas
- March 28 – Walt Masters

=== April ===
- April 2 – Luke Appling
- April 5 – John Goodell
- April 5 – Sugar Cain
- April 7 – Oral Hildebrand
- April 7 – Leo Schrall
- April 10 – Cliff Bolton
- April 17 – Bobby Stevens
- April 19 – Bill Ferrazzi
- April 22 – Tom Lanning
- April 23 – Dolph Camilli
- April 25 – Roy Parmelee
- April 30 – Jumbo Brown

=== May ===
- May 4 – Milt Galatzer
- May 6 – Ivy Andrews
- May 9 – Ed Cihocki
- May 11 – Rip Sewell
- May 15 – Ed Baecht
- May 26 – Emil Roy
- May 28 – Marv Olson
- May 29 – Phil Gallivan

=== June ===
- June 4 – George Washington
- June 6 – Bill Dickey
- June 13 – Gene Desautels
- June 22 – George Puccinelli
- June 23 – Dusty Cooke
- June 24 – Rollie Hemsley
- June 26 – Debs Garms
- June 28 – Joe Cascarella

=== July ===
- July 5 – Bill Byrd
- July 7 – Harold Greiner
- July 10 – John Michaels
- July 12 – Bob Cooney
- July 16 – Reggie Grabowski
- July 17 – Hank Patterson
- July 25 – Bill Andrus
- July 25 – Joe Zapustas
- July 27 – Ed Carroll

=== August ===
- August 4 – George Caster
- August 6 – Tom Hughes
- August 7 – Clarence Heise
- August 11 – Jim Galvin
- August 11 – Woody Jensen
- August 11 – Bobo Newsom
- August 11 – Gordon Rhodes
- August 13 – George Susce
- August 17 – Ed Durham
- August 20 – Beau Bell
- August 20 – Bill Crouch
- August 21 – Art Garibaldi
- August 21 – Wally Hebert
- August 21 – Cobe Jones
- August 24 – Beryl Richmond
- August 25 – Rufus Meadows
- August 28 – Paul Dixon
- August 29 – Pep Young
- August 31 – Ray Berres
- August 31 – Jack Burns

=== September ===
- September 2 – Ben Sankey
- September 3 – Ralph Burgin
- September 7 – Bill McAfee
- September 8 – Buck Leonard
- September 12 – Ollie Bejma
- September 12 – Spud Chandler
- September 13 – John Campbell
- September 15 – Fritz Ostermueller
- September 17 – Charlie Bates
- September 27 – Josh Billings
- September 27 – Walter Murphy
- September 27 – Whit Wyatt

=== October ===
- October 5 – Frank Doljack
- October 12 – Al Smith
- October 12 – Phil Weintraub
- October 16 – Bill Breckinridge
- October 22 – Provine Bradley
- October 22 – Jimmie Foxx
- October 23 – Lee Grissom
- October 24 – Grant Bowler
- October 28 – George Hennessey
- October 31 – Ray Treadaway

=== November ===
- November 1 – Larry French
- November 6 – Earl Clark
- November 8 – Tony Cuccinello
- November 11 – Hank Erickson
- November 22 – Dick Bartell
- November 26 – Gowell Claset
- November 28 – Lynn King

=== December ===
- December 8 – Bill Beckmann
- December 21 – Freddie Muller
- December 26 – Harry Taylor

== Deaths ==
=== January–March ===
- January 10 – Bob Langsford, 41, shortstop for the 1899 Louisville Colonels
- January 16 – Jake Evans, 50, right fielder who played from 1879 through 1885 with four National League teams
- January 19 – William A. Nimick, 58, president of the Pittsburgh Alleghenys (1885–1890) and part-owner of the team
- March 12 – Pat Hynes, 23, outfielder for the St. Louis Browns/Cardinals from 1903 to 1904
- March 28 – Chick Stahl, 34, outfielder for Boston teams in the NL and AL, and manager of the Red Sox since August, who batted .305 lifetime; had three triples in 1903 World Series, and led AL in triples in 1904
- March 29 – Doug Crothers, 47, pitcher for the 1884 Kansas City Cowboys and 1885 New York Metropolitans
- March 29 – Cozy Dolan, 34, right fielder who hit .269 in 830 games for five teams from 1895 to 1906

=== April–June ===
- April 16 – Bill Zies, 39, catcher for the 1891 St. Louis Browns
- April 21 – Nat Hicks, 62, catcher/manager in four seasons with the New York Mutuals
- April 22 – Jeremiah Reardon, 38, pitcher for the Cincinnati Red Stockings (1886) and St. Louis Maroons (1866)
- May 6 – Frank Selman, 55[?], utility player from 1871 through 1875 for five teams of the National Association
- May 7 – Sam Moffet, 50, outfielder/pitcher for the 1884 Cleveland Blues and 1888 Indianapolis Hoosiers
- June 10 – Tun Berger, 39, catcher for the Pittsburgh Alleghenys/Pirates (1890/1891) and Washington Senators (1892).
- June 12 – George Bryant, 50, second baseman for the 1885 Detroit Wolverines.
- June 17 – Frank McCarton, 52, outfielder for the 1872 Middletown Mansfields
- June 20 – Ezra Sutton, 56, third baseman for Boston who led the National League in hits in 1884, was fifth player to collect 1000 hits, and batted .300 three times in the National Association and four times in the National League
- June 24 – Billy Klusman, 42, second baseman for the 1888 Boston Beaneaters and 1890 St. Louis Browns

=== July–September ===
- July 4 – Connie McGeehan, pitcher/left fielder for the 1903 Philadelphia Athletics
- July 22 – Pat Dillard, 34, OF/IF utility for the 1900 St. Louis Cardinals
- August 14 – Scott Hastings, 60, catcher/outfielder/manager for seven seasons from 1871 to 1877
- September 14 – Jack Wentz, 44, second baseman for the 1891 Louisville Colonels
- September 21 – Claude Gouzzie, 34, second baseman for the 1903 St. Louis Browns
- September 23 – Charlie Buffinton, 46, pitcher for Boston and Philadelphia teams who won 233 games, including 48 for the 1884 Boston Beaneaters

=== October–December ===
- October 4 – Frank Leary, 26, pitcher for the 1907 Cincinnati Reds
- October 12 – Whitey Gibson, 39, catcher for the 1888 Philadelphia Athletics
- October 28 – Ted Kennedy, 42, pitcher for the Chicago White Stockings (1885) and Louisville Colonels (1886)
- November 26 – Eddie Burke, 41, outfielder for the Philadelphia Phillies, Pittsburgh Alleghenys, Milwaukee Brewers, Cincinnati Reds, and New York Giants from 1890 to 1895, who topped the National League in games played (135) and times hit by pitches (25) in 1893
- December 8 – Washington Fulmer, 67, outfielder for the 1875 Brooklyn Atlantics
- December 27 – Jim Andrews, 42, right fielder for the 1890 Chicago Colts.
- December 31 – Jocko Flynn, 43, pitcher/outfielder for the 1886 Chicago White Stockings
