= Johnny Bates (baseball) =

American baseball player (1882–1949)

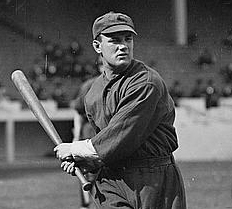
- Bates in 1913
- Outfielder
- Born: August 21, 1882; Steubenville, Ohio, U.S.
- Died: February 10, 1949 (aged 66); Steubenville, Ohio, U.S.
- Batted: Left Threw: Left

MLB debut
- April 12, 1906, for the Boston Beaneaters

Last MLB appearance
- October 10, 1914, for the Baltimore Terrapins

MLB statistics
- Batting average: .278
- Home runs: 25
- Runs batted in: 417
- Stats at Baseball Reference

Teams
- Boston Beaneaters/Boston Doves (1906–09); Philadelphia Phillies (1909–10); Cincinnati Reds (1911–14); Chicago Cubs (1914); Baltimore Terrapins (1914)

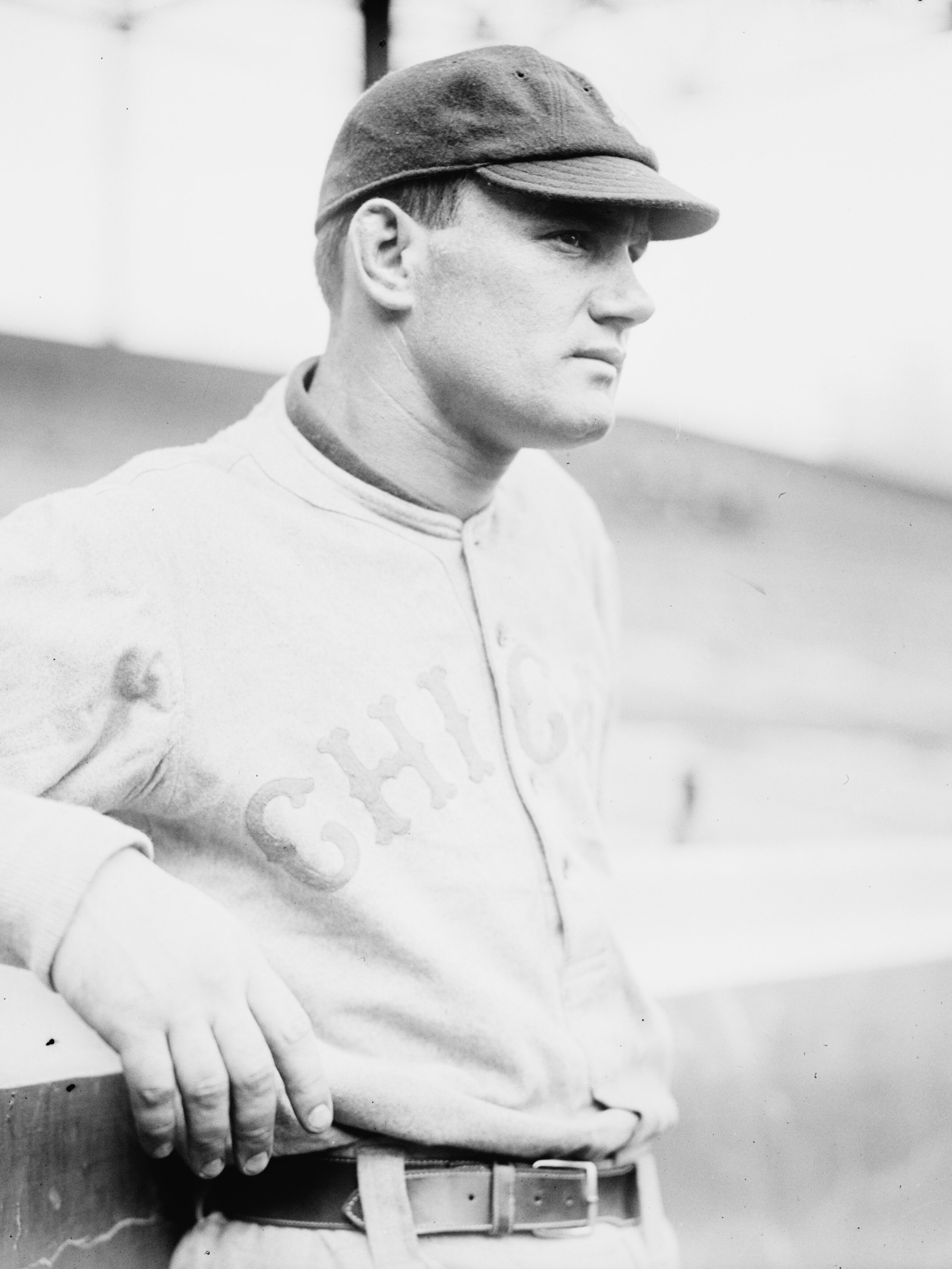
Johnny Bates in 1914

John William Bates (August 21, 1882 – February 10, 1949) was an American Major League Baseball outfielder. He played nine seasons in the majors from 1906 until 1914. Bates played for the Boston Beaneaters, Philadelphia Phillies, Cincinnati Reds, and Chicago Cubs in the National League, and finished his career with the Baltimore Terrapins of the Federal League. Bates hit for the cycle in 1907.

== Early life ==
Bates was born in Steubenville, Ohio. He entered professional baseball with the 1905 Sharon Steels, a new team in the Ohio-Pennsylvania League.

== Career ==
Bates made his major league debut in April 1906 with the Boston Beaneaters. He hit a home run in that first major league game, one of only six home runs he hit that season and one of 25 major league home runs in his career. He became a regular outfielder for Boston right away, playing 140 games that first season.

On April 26, 1907, Bates hit for the cycle at Washington Park in Brooklyn. He was the Boston leadoff hitter, but until that game he had gotten only 8 hits in 48 at bats in the 1907 season. He hit a triple in the first at bat of the game, an infield single in the third inning, a double in the fifth inning, and a home run in the seventh inning. Boston beat Brooklyn 4-2. Bates was the third player in franchise history to hit for the cycle.

In July 1909, Bates was hitting .288, much higher than his previous season batting averages, when Boston traded him to the Philadelphia Phillies in a multiplayer deal. He then hit .293 for the Phillies that year.

Bates was involved in another multiplayer trade after 1910 season, this time to the Cincinnati Reds. He had one of his best seasons with the 1911 Reds. He hit .292 that year and, largely because his walk total ballooned to 103, he had an on base percentage of .415. His last major league season was 1914, which he split between the Reds, the Chicago Cubs, and the Baltimore Terrapins of the Federal League. In 1154 games, Bates recorded 1087 hits, 25 home runs and 417 RBI with a .278 batting average.

From 1915 to 1918, Bates returned to the minor leagues, playing mostly in the International League.

== Later life ==
Bates was a glassworker after retiring from baseball, and then he became a deputy sheriff for Jefferson County, Ohio. His stepson, Robert Dobbie Bates, was the county sheriff there in the late 1930s and 1940s. In 1949, Bates had a heart attack while he was shoveling snow, and he died ten days later in his native Steubenville.

== See also ==
- List of Major League Baseball players with a home run in their first major league at bat
- List of Major League Baseball players to hit for the cycle

Achievements
Preceded by Sam Mertes	Hitting for the cycle April 26, 1907	Succeeded by Otis Clymer
