= 1913 Boston Braves season =

1913 Boston Braves
- League: National League
- Ballpark: South End Grounds
- City: Boston, Massachusetts
- Record: 69–82 (.457)
- League place: 5th
- Owners: James Gaffney
- Managers: George Stallings

The 1913 Boston Braves season was the 43rd season of the franchise. The Braves finished fifth in the National League with a record of 69 wins and 82 losses.

== Offseason ==
- December 1912: Guy Zinn was purchased by the Braves from the New York Highlanders.

== Regular season ==
=== Season standings ===
National League
Team	W	L	Pct.	GB	Home	Road
New York Giants	101	51	.664	—	54‍–‍23	47‍–‍28
Philadelphia Phillies	88	63	.583	12½	43‍–‍33	45‍–‍30
Chicago Cubs	88	65	.575	13½	51‍–‍25	37‍–‍40
Pittsburgh Pirates	78	71	.523	21½	41‍–‍35	37‍–‍36
Boston Braves	69	82	.457	31½	34‍–‍40	35‍–‍42
Brooklyn Dodgers	65	84	.436	34½	29‍–‍47	36‍–‍37
Cincinnati Reds	64	89	.418	37½	32‍–‍44	32‍–‍45
St. Louis Cardinals	51	99	.340	49	25‍–‍48	26‍–‍51

=== Record vs. opponents ===
1913 National League record Sources:
Team	BSN	BRO	CHC	CIN	NYG	PHI	PIT	STL
Boston	—	10–10–1	9–13	8–14	8–14	7–15–1	11–10	16–6–1
Brooklyn	10–10–1	—	9–13	9–13	8–14	8–13–1	8–14–1	13–7
Chicago	13–9	13–9	—	13–9–1	7–14	13–9	13–9	16–6–1
Cincinnati	14–8	13–9	9–13–1	—	5–17	5–17–1	8–13–1	10–12
New York	14–8	14–8	14–7	17–5	—	14–8–3	14–8–1	14–7
Philadelphia	15–7–1	13–8–1	9–13	17–5–1	8–14–3	—	9–11–2	17–5
Pittsburgh	10–11	14–8–1	9–13	13–8–1	8–14–1	11–9–2	—	13–8–1
St. Louis	6–16–1	7–13	6–16–1	12–10	7–14	5–17	8–13–1	—

=== Roster ===
1913 Boston Braves
Roster
Pitchers: Buster Brown; Gene Cocreham; George Davis; Walt Dickson; Lefty Gervais; Otto Hess; Bill James; Win Noyes; Hub Perdue; Jack Quinn; Dick Rudolph; Paul Strand; Lefty Tyler	Catchers: Drummond Brown; Rex DeVogt; Hank Gowdy; Bill Rariden; Walt Tragesser; Bert Whaling; Infielders: Art Bues; Bill Calhoun; Charlie Deal; Art Devlin; Oscar Dugey; Rabbit Maranville; Jeff McCleskey; Tex McDonald; Hap Myers; Butch Schmidt; Fred Smith; Bill Sweeney	Outfielders: Otis Clymer; Wilson Collins; Joe Connolly; Tommy Griffith; George Jackson; Jay Kirke; Bris Lord; Les Mann; Bill McKechnie; Joe Schultz; Cy Seymour; John Titus; Guy Zinn; Other batters: Bill McTigue; Fred Mitchell	Manager: George Stallings

== Player stats ==
=== Batting ===
==== Starters by position ====
Note: Pos = Position; G = Games played; AB = At bats; H = Hits; Avg. = Batting average; HR = Home runs; RBI = Runs batted in

Pos	Player	G	AB	H	Avg.	HR	RBI
C	Bill Rariden	95	246	58	.236	3	30
1B	Hap Myers	140	524	143	.273	2	50
2B	Bill Sweeney	139	502	129	.257	0	47
SS	Rabbit Maranville	143	571	141	.247	2	48
3B	Art Devlin	73	210	48	.229	0	12
OF	John Titus	87	269	80	.297	5	38
OF	Les Mann	120	407	103	.253	3	51
OF	Joe Connolly	126	427	120	.281	5	57

==== Other batters ====
Note: G = Games played; AB = At bats; H = Hits; Avg. = Batting average; HR = Home runs; RBI = Runs batted in

Player	G	AB	H	Avg.	HR	RBI
Fred Smith	92	285	65	.228	0	27
Bris Lord	73	235	59	.251	6	26
Bert Whaling	79	211	51	.242	0	25
Tex McDonald	62	145	52	.359	0	18
Guy Zinn	36	138	41	.297	1	15
Tommy Griffith	37	127	32	.252	1	12
Butch Schmidt	22	78	24	.308	1	14
Cy Seymour	39	73	13	.178	0	10
Jay Kirke	18	38	9	.237	0	3
Otis Clymer	14	37	12	.324	0	6
Charlie Deal	10	36	11	.306	0	3
Drummond Brown	15	34	11	.324	1	2
Joe Schultz	9	18	4	.222	0	1
Bill Calhoun	6	13	1	.077	0	0
George Jackson	3	10	3	.300	0	0
Oscar Dugey	5	8	2	.250	0	0
Rex DeVogt	3	6	0	.000	0	0
Hank Gowdy	3	5	3	.600	0	2
Bill McKechnie	1	4	0	.000	0	0
Jeff McCleskey	2	3	0	.000	0	0
Fred Mitchell	4	3	1	.333	0	0
Wilson Collins	16	3	1	.333	0	0
Art Bues	2	1	0	.000	0	0
Bill McTigue	1	0	0	----	0	0
Walt Tragesser	2	0	0	----	0	0

=== Pitching ===
==== Starting pitchers ====
Note: G = Games pitched; IP = Innings pitched; W = Wins; L = Losses; ERA = Earned run average; SO = Strikeouts

Player	G	IP	W	L	ERA	SO
Lefty Tyler	39	290.1	16	17	2.79	143
Dick Rudolph	33	249.1	14	13	2.92	109
Otto Hess	29	218.1	7	17	3.83	80
Hub Perdue	38	212.1	16	13	3.26	91
Walt Dickson	19	128.0	6	7	3.23	47
Jack Quinn	8	56.1	4	3	2.40	33
Gene Cocreham	1	8.1	0	1	7.56	3

==== Other pitchers ====
Note: G = Games pitched; IP = Innings pitched; W = Wins; L = Losses; ERA = Earned run average; SO = Strikeouts

Player	G	IP	W	L	ERA	SO
Bill James	24	135.2	6	10	2.79	73
Lefty Gervais	5	15.2	0	1	5.74	1

==== Relief pitchers ====
Note: G = Games pitched; W = Wins; L = Losses; SV = Saves; ERA = Earned run average; SO = Strikeouts

Player	G	W	L	SV	ERA	SO
Win Noyes	11	0	0	0	4.79	5
Paul Strand	7	0	0	0	2.12	6
Buster Brown	2	0	0	0	4.73	3
George Davis	2	0	0	0	4.50	3
