= Bert Whaling =

American baseball player (1888–1965)

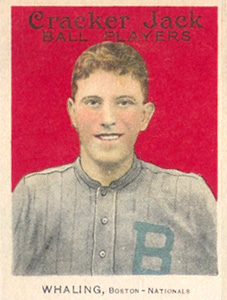
- Catcher
- Born: June 22, 1888; Los Angeles, California, U.S.
- Died: January 21, 1965 (aged 76); Sawtelle, California, U.S.
- Batted: Right Threw: Right

MLB debut
- April 22, 1913, for the Boston Braves

Last MLB appearance
- October 7, 1915, for the Boston Braves

MLB statistics
- Batting average: .225
- Home runs: 0
- Runs batted in: 50
- Stats at Baseball Reference

Teams
- Boston Braves (1913–1915)

Career highlights and awards
- World Series champion (1914)

Albert James Whaling (June 22, 1888 – January 7, 1965) was an American professional baseball player. He played in Major League Baseball as a catcher from 1913 to 1915 for the Boston Braves. Whaling was a member of the "Miracle" Braves team that went from last place at mid-season to win the 1914 National League pennant and the 1914 World Series.

Whaling excelled defensively as a catcher with a strong throwing arm however, his fielding prowess was not enough to overcome his deficiencies as a hitter at the major league level so, he played the majority of his career in the minor leagues.

== Baseball career ==
Whaling was born in Los Angeles, California on June 22, 1888 to Canadian immigrant parents. He began his professional baseball career at the age of 20 with the Portland Beavers of the Pacific Coast League in 1908. He started the 1909 season with the Salt Lake Mormons of the Inter-Mountain League before the team relocated to Livingston, Montana at mid-season, but the league was disbanded at the end of the season.

Whaling then appeared in 11 games for the Seattle Turks of the Northwestern League in 1909. At the end of the season, he returned to Los Angeles and played for the Vernon Tigers in the Semi-professional California Winter League.

In August 1911, he was signed by the Cleveland Naps of the American League, but did not play at the major league level and returned to play for the Seattle Giants where, he posted a .264 batting average in 29 games toward the end of the 1911 season. He reported to spring training in March 1912, but was released by the Naps in April.

Whaling then resigned with the Seattle Giants where he began the 1912 season as their starting catcher. He posted a .264 batting average along with 10 home runs in 138 games. His defensive skills were made evident as he threw out 188 baserunners attempting to steal a base during the 1912 season. During the deadball era, catchers played a huge defensive role, given the large number of bunts and stolen base attempts, as well as the difficulty of handling the spitball pitchers who dominated pitching staffs. A newspaper report in 1912 called Whaling the best catcher to have ever played in the Northwestern League (The league had been created in 1905, 7 years prior to the newspaper report).

Whaling signed a contract to play for the Boston Braves in October 1912, and made his major league debut with the team on April 22, 1913 at the age of 25. He posted a .242 batting average in 79 games while sharing starting catching duties with Bill Rariden. Whaling led the league with a .990 fielding percentage that year, becoming the first rookie catcher in major league baseball history to win a fielding title. Only four other rookie catchers in Major League Baseball history have accomplished the feat.

Before the 1914 season began, Rariden left the Braves to join the Federal League leaving Whaling as their main catcher with Hank Gowdy as his back up. When Whaling failed to provide much offense, Braves manager, George Stallings gave Gowdy the starting catcher's job. The Braves had been in last place in the National League on July 4 before going on an extended winning streak. The team went from last place to first place within a two-month period, becoming the first team to win a pennant after being in last place on the Fourth of July. Whaling hit .206 in 60 games as Gowdy's back up and led National League catchers in baserunners caught stealing percentage with 54.5%. The Braves went on to sweep Connie Mack's heavily favored Philadelphia Athletics in four games in the 1914 World Series, although Whaling never got a chance to play in the series. The team became known as the "Miracle" Braves and remain one of the most storied comeback teams in baseball history.

While he was a weak hitter and a slow runner, Whaling developed a reputation as a fine defensive catcher. In his final major league season, 1915, Whaling hit .221 in 72 games (42 at-bats), once again as the back up to Gowdy. He appeared in his final major league game on October 7, 1915. It was reported that there was friction between Whaling and the Braves management and, on October 13, he was traded with Herbie Moran to the Vernon Tigers for Joe Wilhoit. After threatening to join the outlaw Federal League, Whaling signed with the Tigers in December 1915.

Whaling played with the Vernon Tigers for two seasons before joining the United States Navy during World War I. After his discharge from military service, Whaling then became a journeyman baseball player. In 1917, he signed to play for the Great Falls Electrics however, two months later he was reported to be playing in Arizona for the Copper Queen Mine baseball team. In 1918, he played in Medicine Hat, Alberta before applying for the job of manager for the Regina Senators of the Western Canada League in 1919. In May 1920, he was signed as a player for the Regina club. Whaling continued to play in minor league baseball, never staying with a team for more than one season with the exception of two seasons spent with the Denver Bears in 1924 and 1925. He played his final season as a player-manager for the Salt Lake City Bees in 1926 before ending his playing career at the age of 38. In the 37 games he played for Salt Lake City in 1926, Whaling hit .333, the only time in his professional career that he had hit higher than .300.

== Career statistics ==
In a three-year major league career, Whaling played in 211 games, accumulating 129 hits in 573 at bats for a .225 career batting average along with 0 home runs, 50 runs batted in and an on-base percentage of .283. He scored 50 runs while walking 39 times and had 98 strikeouts. His .986 career fielding average was 15 points higher than the league average over the span of his playing career. Whaling also spent twelve seasons in the minor leagues, hitting .245 in 793 games.

== Minor league manager ==
After serving as a player-manager for the Salt Lake City Bees in 1926, Whaling was named the manager of the Phoenix Senators, and led them to the Arizona State League championship in 1928.

After his playing career, Whaling returned to the Los Angeles area where he worked in the film industry as a sound man. He died at the Sawtelle Veterans Hospital in Los Angeles County on January 21, 1965, at the age of 76. The cause of death was listed as metastatic adenocarcinoma. He was buried in the Los Angeles National Cemetery.
