= 1914 Boston Braves season =

Major League Baseball season

1914 Boston Braves
- World Series champions National League champions
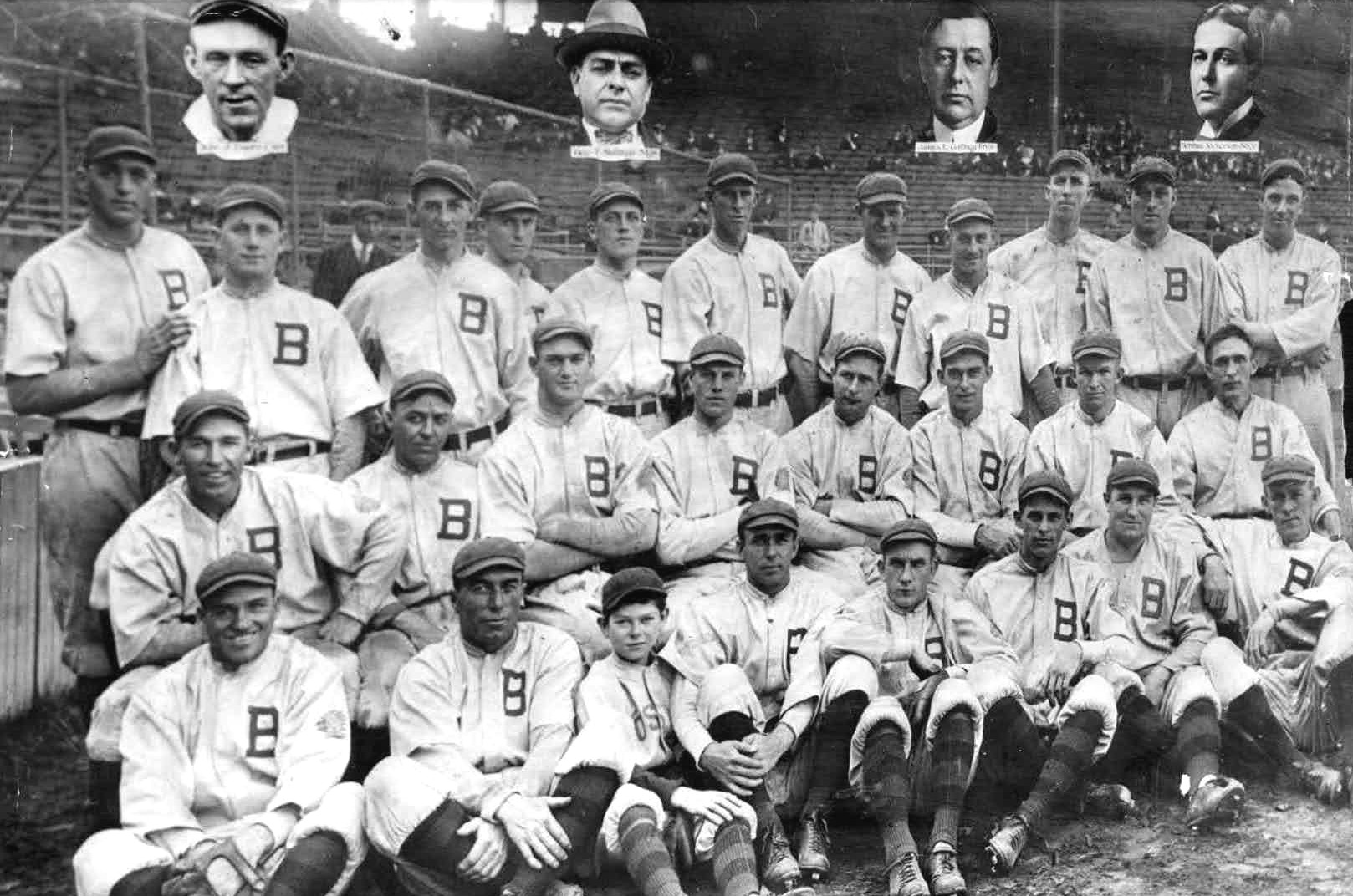
- League: National League
- Ballpark: South End Grounds (since 1871); Fenway Park
- City: Boston, Massachusetts
- Record: 94–59–5 (.614)
- League place: 1st
- Owners: James Gaffney
- Managers: George Stallings

The 1914 Boston Braves season was the 44th season of the franchise. The team finished first in the National League, winning the pennant by 10½ games over the New York Giants after being in last place in the NL at midseason. The team, which became known as the 1914 Miracle Braves, went on to sweep the Philadelphia Athletics in the World Series.

== Offseason ==
- Prior to 1914 season: Guy Zinn jumped from the Braves to the Baltimore Terrapins.

== Regular season ==
The Braves performed one of the most memorable reversals in major league history, going from last place to first place in two months, becoming the first team to win a pennant after being in last place on the Fourth of July. After finishing in fifth place in 1913 with a record of 69 wins and 82 losses, the Braves were not expected to be contenders. They spent the first part of the season in last place, posting a record of 26 wins and 40 losses in early July. Led by three pitchers, Dick Rudolph, Bill James, and Lefty Tyler, the team began to win games, taking over first place for good on September 8. Their record over their final 87 games was 68–19 for a winning percentage of .782. Infielders Johnny Evers and Rabbit Maranville led the league in double plays. The Braves went on to sweep Connie Mack's heavily favored Athletics in four games in the 1914 World Series to become the first team to follow a losing season with a World Series-winning season. Only six teams before the beginning of divisional play accomplished this feat. The team became known as the "Miracle" Braves and remain one of the most storied comeback teams in baseball history. The franchise would not win another pennant until 1948.

=== Season standings ===
National League
Team	W	L	Pct.	GB	Home	Road
Boston Braves	94	59	.614	—	51‍–‍25	43‍–‍34
New York Giants	84	70	.545	10½	43‍–‍36	41‍–‍34
St. Louis Cardinals	81	72	.529	13	42‍–‍34	39‍–‍38
Chicago Cubs	78	76	.506	16½	46‍–‍30	32‍–‍46
Brooklyn Robins	75	79	.487	19½	45‍–‍34	30‍–‍45
Philadelphia Phillies	74	80	.481	20½	48‍–‍30	26‍–‍50
Pittsburgh Pirates	69	85	.448	25½	39‍–‍36	30‍–‍49
Cincinnati Reds	60	94	.390	34½	34‍–‍42	26‍–‍52

=== Record vs. opponents ===
1914 National League record Sources:
Team	BSN	BRO	CHC	CIN	NYG	PHI	PIT	STL
Boston	—	9–13	16–6	14–8–2	11–11–1	12–10	17–5–1	15–6–1
Brooklyn	13–9	—	10–12	11–11	9–13	11–11	16–6	5–17
Chicago	6–16	12–10	—	17–5	9–13	12–10	12–10	10–12–2
Cincinnati	8–14–2	11–11	5–17	—	9–13	9–13	8–14–1	10–12
New York	11–11–1	13–9	13–9	13–9	—	12–10	13–9–1	9–13
Philadelphia	10–12	11–11	10–12	13–9	10–12	—	12–10	8–14
Pittsburgh	5–17–1	6–16	10–12	14–8–1	9–13–1	10–12	—	15–7–1
St. Louis	6–15–1	17–5	12–10–2	12–10	13–9	14–8	7–15–1	—

=== Roster ===
1914 Boston Braves
Roster
Pitchers: Gene Cocreham; Ensign Cottrell; Dick Crutcher; George Davis; Otto Hess; Tom Hughes; Bill James; Dolf Luque; Hub Perdue; Dick Rudolph; Paul Strand; Lefty Tyler	Catchers: Hank Gowdy; Fred Tyler; Bert Whaling; Infielders: Charlie Deal; Johnny Evers; Clarence Kraft; Rabbit Maranville; Billy Martin; Jack Martin; Butch Schmidt; Red Smith	Outfielders: Ted Cather; Wilson Collins; Joe Connolly; Josh Devore; Oscar Dugey; Larry Gilbert; Tommy Griffith; Les Mann; Herbie Moran; Jim Murray; Possum Whitted	Manager: George Stallings

== Player stats ==
= Indicates team leader

=== Batting ===
==== Starters by position ====
Note: Pos. = Position; G = Games played; AB = At bats; R = Runs; H = Hits; HR = Home runs; RBI = Runs batted in; Avg. = Batting average; SB = Stolen bases

Pos.	Player	G	AB	R	H	Avg.	HR	RBI	SB
C	Hank Gowdy	128	366	42	89	.243	3	46	14
1B	Butch Schmidt	147	537	67	153	.285	1	71	14
2B	Johnny Evers	139	491	81	137	.279	1	40	12
3B	Charlie Deal	79	257	17	54	.210	0	23	4
SS	Rabbit Maranville	156	586	74	144	.246	4	78	28
OF	Larry Gilbert	72	224	32	60	.268	5	25	3
OF	Les Mann	126	389	44	96	.247	4	40	9
OF	Joe Connolly	120	399	64	122	.306	9	65	12

==== Other batters ====
Note: G = Games played; AB = At bats; H = Hits; Avg. = Batting average; HR = Home runs; RBI = Runs batted in

Player	G	AB	H	Avg.	HR	RBI
Possum Whitted	66	218	57	.261	2	31
Red Smith	60	207	65	.314	3	37
Bert Whaling	60	172	36	.209	0	12
Herbie Moran	41	154	41	.266	0	4
Ted Cather	50	145	43	.297	0	27
Josh Devore	51	128	29	.227	1	5
Jim Murray	39	112	26	.232	0	12
Oscar Dugey	58	109	21	.193	1	10
Jack Martin	33	85	18	.212	0	5
Tommy Griffith	16	48	5	.104	0	1
Wilson Collins	27	35	9	.257	0	1
Fred Tyler	6	19	2	.105	0	2
Clarence Kraft	3	3	1	.333	0	0
Billy Martin	1	3	0	.000	0	0

=== Pitching ===
==== Starting pitchers ====
Note: G = Games pitched; IP = Innings pitched; W = Wins; L = Losses; ERA = Earned run average; SO = Strikeouts

Player	G	IP	W	L	ERA	SO
Dick Rudolph	42	336.1	26	10	2.35	138
Bill James	46	332.1	26	7	1.90	156
Lefty Tyler	38	271.1	16	13	2.69	140
Otto Hess	14	89.0	5	6	3.03	24
Hub Perdue	9	51.0	2	5	5.82	13
Tom Hughes	2	17.0	2	0	2.65	11
Ensign Cottrell	1	1.0	0	1	9.00	1

==== Other pitchers ====
Note: G = Games pitched; IP = Innings pitched; W = Wins; L = Losses; ERA = Earned run average; SO = Strikeouts

Player	G	IP	W	L	ERA	SO
Dick Crutcher	33	158.2	5	7	3.46	58
George Davis	9	55.2	3	3	3.40	26
Paul Strand	16	55.1	6	2	2.44	33
Gene Cocreham	15	44.2	3	4	4.84	15
Dolf Luque	2	8.2	0	1	4.15	1

== 1914 World Series ==
Boston Braves (4) vs Philadelphia Athletics (0)

Game	Score	Date	Location	Attendance
1	Boston Braves – 7, Philadelphia Athletics – 1	October 9	Shibe Park	20,562
2	Boston Braves – 1, Philadelphia Athletics – 0	October 10	Shibe Park	20,562
3	Philadelphia Athletics – 4, Boston Braves – 5 (12 innings)	October 12	Fenway Park	35,520
4	Philadelphia Athletics – 1, Boston Braves – 3	October 13	Fenway Park	34,365
