= List of World Series sweeps =

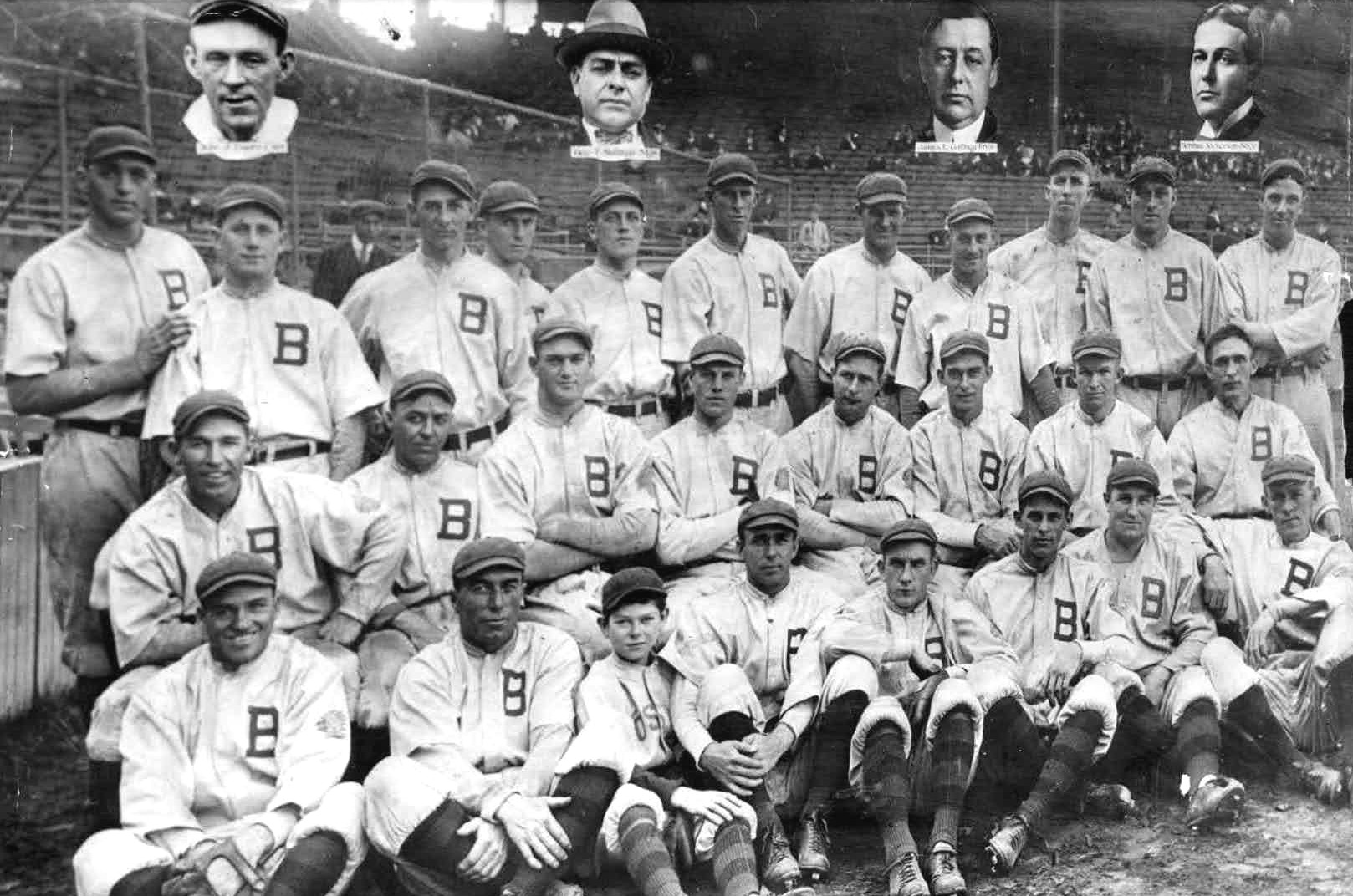
The Boston Braves completed the first official sweep in MLB history, beating the Philadelphia Athletics in the 1914 World Series by winning four straight games and losing none.

In the World Series, a sweep refers to a Major League Baseball (MLB) team winning four straight games and losing none in a best-of-seven format.

There have been 19 sweeps in World Series history. The American League has been responsible for thirteen of the sweeps, with the New York Yankees account for more than half of those, with a record eight. The National League is responsible for the remaining six sweeps, with the New York / San Francisco Giants and the Cincinnati Reds each achieving two.

The first sweep is credited to the 1914 "Miracle" Boston Braves who defeated the 1914 Philadelphia Athletics in four straight games. The most recent sweep occurred in the 2012 World Series, when the San Francisco Giants defeated the Detroit Tigers.

== List of sweeps ==
Key
National League team (NL)
American League team (AL)

Year	Winning team	Manager	Losing team	Manager	Series MVP	Ref.
1914	Boston Braves	George Stallings	Philadelphia Athletics	Connie Mack	—	
1927	New York Yankees	Miller Huggins	Pittsburgh Pirates	Donie Bush	—	
1928	New York Yankees	Miller Huggins	St. Louis Cardinals	Bill McKechnie	—	
1932	New York Yankees	Joe McCarthy	Chicago Cubs	Charlie Grimm	—	
1938	New York Yankees	Joe McCarthy	Chicago Cubs	Gabby Hartnett	—	
1939	New York Yankees	Joe McCarthy	Cincinnati Reds	Bill McKechnie	—	
1950	New York Yankees	Casey Stengel	Philadelphia Phillies	Eddie Sawyer	—	
1954	New York Giants	Leo Durocher	Cleveland Indians	Al López	—	
1963	Los Angeles Dodgers	Walter Alston	New York Yankees	Ralph Houk	Sandy Koufax	
1966	Baltimore Orioles	Hank Bauer	Los Angeles Dodgers	Walter Alston	Frank Robinson	
1976	Cincinnati Reds	Sparky Anderson	New York Yankees	Billy Martin	Johnny Bench	
1989	Oakland Athletics	Tony La Russa	San Francisco Giants	Roger Craig	Dave Stewart	
1990	Cincinnati Reds	Lou Piniella	Oakland Athletics	Tony La Russa	José Rijo	
1998	New York Yankees	Joe Torre	San Diego Padres	Bruce Bochy	Scott Brosius	
1999	New York Yankees	Joe Torre	Atlanta Braves	Bobby Cox	Mariano Rivera	
2004	Boston Red Sox	Terry Francona	St. Louis Cardinals	Tony La Russa	Manny Ramirez	
2005	Chicago White Sox	Ozzie Guillén	Houston Astros^{[N]}	Phil Garner	Jermaine Dye	
2007	Boston Red Sox	Terry Francona	Colorado Rockies	Clint Hurdle	Mike Lowell	
2012	San Francisco Giants	Bruce Bochy	Detroit Tigers	Jim Leyland	Pablo Sandoval	

=== Disputed ===
There is a dispute as to whether the following World Series can be considered sweeps as, in both cases, while the team did win four games and lost none, each series had a tied game. A number of sources do not recognize them as official sweeps while others list them as such.

Year	Winning team	Manager	Series result	Losing team	Manager	Ref.
1907	Chicago Cubs	Frank Chance	4–0–(1)	Detroit Tigers	Hugh Jennings	
1922	New York Giants	John McGraw	4–0–(1)	New York Yankees	Miller Huggins	

== Sweeps by franchise ==
The New York Yankees have completed the most numbers of sweeps in MLB history, with eight. The New York / San Francisco Giants, Cincinnati Reds, and Boston Red Sox are tied at second with two each. To date, the Red Sox are the only team with multiple sweeps to have never been swept themselves.

The most times a team has been swept is two, with four teams "earning" the distinction: Chicago Cubs, Philadelphia / Oakland Athletics, New York Yankees, St. Louis Cardinals. Of those teams, the Cubs and the Cardinals have never completed a sweep themselves.

Franchise	No. of sweeps achieved	No. of sweeps by opponent
New York Yankees	8	2
Boston Red Sox	2	0
New York / San Francisco Giants	2	1
Cincinnati Reds	2	1
St. Louis Browns / Baltimore Orioles	1	0
Chicago White Sox	1	0
Brooklyn / Los Angeles Dodgers	1	1
Boston / Milwaukee / Atlanta Braves	1	1
Philadelphia / Kansas City / Oakland Athletics	1	2
Cleveland Guardians	0	1
Houston Astros	0	1
San Diego Padres	0	1
Philadelphia Phillies	0	1
Pittsburgh Pirates	0	1
Detroit Tigers	0	1
Colorado Rockies	0	1
Chicago Cubs	0	2
St. Louis Cardinals	0	2
Los Angeles Angels	0	0
Arizona Diamondbacks	0	0
Seattle Mariners	0	0
Texas Rangers	0	0
Montreal Expos / Washington Nationals	0	0
Kansas City Royals	0	0
Miami Marlins	0	0
Milwaukee Brewers	0	0
Washington Senators / Minnesota Twins	0	0
New York Mets	0	0
Tampa Bay Rays	0	0
Toronto Blue Jays	0	0

== Instances where a sweep was prevented ==
In the 26 times teams have taken a 3-0 World Series lead, the opponent has forced a Game 5 five times. No team which has forced a World Series Game 5 has gone on to force a Game 6, let alone complete a comeback, i.e. a "reverse sweep."

Year	Winning team	Manager	Series result	Losing team	Manager	Ref.
1910	Philadelphia Athletics	Connie Mack	4–1	Chicago Cubs	Frank Chance	
1937	New York Yankees	Joe McCarthy	4–1	New York Giants	Bill Terry	
1970	Baltimore Orioles	Earl Weaver	4–1	Cincinnati Reds	Sparky Anderson	
2024	Los Angeles Dodgers	Dave Roberts	4–1	New York Yankees	Aaron Boone	
2026	Milwaukee Brewers	Pat Murphy	4–1	Tampa Bay Rays	Kevin Cash	

== See also ==
- List of World Series champions
  - List of Major League Baseball game sevens
- List of teams that have overcome 3–0 series deficits

== Notes ==
- ^{N} The Astros were in the National League from 1962 to 2012, after which they moved to the American League.
