= McCleskey =

McCleskey is a surname. Notable people with the surname include:

- Jeff McCleskey (1891–1971), American baseball player
- J. J. McCleskey (born 1970), American football player

== See also ==
- McCleskey v. Kemp, a United States Supreme Court case
