= Possum Whitted =

American baseball player (1890–1962)

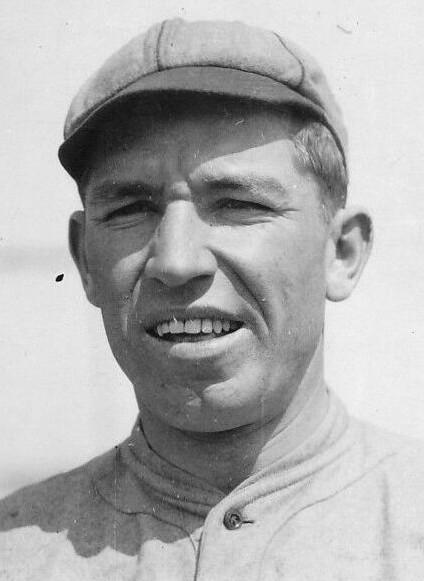
- Whitted in 1913
- Outfielder
- Born: February 4, 1890; Durham, North Carolina, U.S.
- Died: October 16, 1962 (aged 72); Wilmington, North Carolina, U.S.
- Batted: Right Threw: Right

MLB debut
- September 16, 1912, for the St. Louis Cardinals

Last MLB appearance
- April 23, 1922, for the Brooklyn Robins

MLB statistics
- Batting average: .269
- Home runs: 23
- Runs batted in: 451
- Stats at Baseball Reference

Teams
- St. Louis Cardinals (1912–1914); Boston Braves (1914); Philadelphia Phillies (1915–1919); Pittsburgh Pirates (1919–1921); Brooklyn Robins (1922)

Career highlights and awards
- World Series champion (1914)

George Bostic "Possum" Whitted (February 4, 1890 – October 16, 1962) was an American professional baseball outfielder and third baseman. He played in Major League Baseball (MLB) from 1912 to 1922 for the St. Louis Cardinals, Boston Braves, Philadelphia Phillies, Pittsburgh Pirates, and Brooklyn Robins.

== Baseball career ==
Whitted was the first rookie in history to start at every position (except pitcher and catcher) during the season.

In 1914, after being traded from the Cardinals to Boston, Whitted was a member of the Braves team that went from last place to first place in two months, becoming the first team to win a pennant after being in last place on the Fourth of July. The team then went on to defeat Connie Mack's heavily favored Philadelphia Athletics in the 1914 World Series. During the 1914 season, Whitted played every position for the Braves except for catcher and pitcher.

Whitted then played for the Phillies in 1915, which won the National League (NL) pennant.

In 11 seasons, Whitted played in 1,025 games and had 3,630 at bats, 440 runs, 978 hits, 145 doubles, 60 triples, 23 home runs, 451 runs batted in, 116 stolen bases, 215 walks, .269 batting average, .313 on-base percentage, .361 slugging percentage, 1,312 total bases, and 180 sacrifice hits. Defensively, he recorded a .966 fielding percentage playing at every position except catcher and pitcher.

== Personal life ==
Whitted died in Wilmington, North Carolina at the age of 72 due to cardiac complications. As a United States Army Sergeant First Class in the Quartermaster Corps during World War I, stationed in France, he met his wife, Isabelle French, and is buried at the Wilmington National Cemetery.

There is presently one survivor of George "Possum" Bostic Whitted, Sr.; his granddaughter, Dr. Tracy Whitted Brown, Neuroscientist and Clinical Neuropsychologist, formerly of the Salk Biological Institute, daughter of Possum's only child, George Bostic Whitted, Jr., of Chapel Hill, Head Chapel Hill Baseball Coach. George Whitted Sr., and George Whitted, Jr., are buried in the VA Cemetery in Wilmington, NC.

Possum's sister, Dr. Bessie Whitted Spence, taught at Duke University, Trinity College of Religion, and was the first female Professor Emeritus.
