= Ted Cather =

American baseball player (1889–1945)

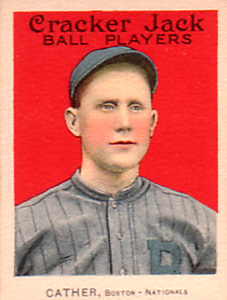
- Cather in 1915.
- Outfielder
- Born: May 20, 1889; Chester, Pennsylvania, U.S.
- Died: April 9, 1945 (aged 55); Elkton, Maryland, U.S.
- Batted: Right Threw: Right

MLB debut
- September 23, 1912, for the St. Louis Cardinals

Last MLB appearance
- July 12, 1915, for the Boston Braves

MLB statistics
- Assists: 20
- Fielding percentage: .939
- Putouts: 227
- Batting average: .252
- Stats at Baseball Reference

Teams
- St. Louis Cardinals (1912–1914); Boston Braves (1914–1915)

Career highlights and awards
- World Series Champion (1914)

Theodore Physick Cather (May 20, 1889 – April 9, 1945) was an American Major League Baseball player who played outfield from 1912–1915. He would play for the St. Louis Cardinals and Boston Braves.

In 1914, Cather was a member of the Braves team that went from last place to first place in two months, becoming the first team to win a pennant after being in last place on the Fourth of July.

In a brief 4-year, 201 game major league career, Cather recorded a .252 batting average (138-for-548) with 60 runs, 2 home runs and 72 RBI.
