= Otto Hess =

American baseball player (1878-1926)

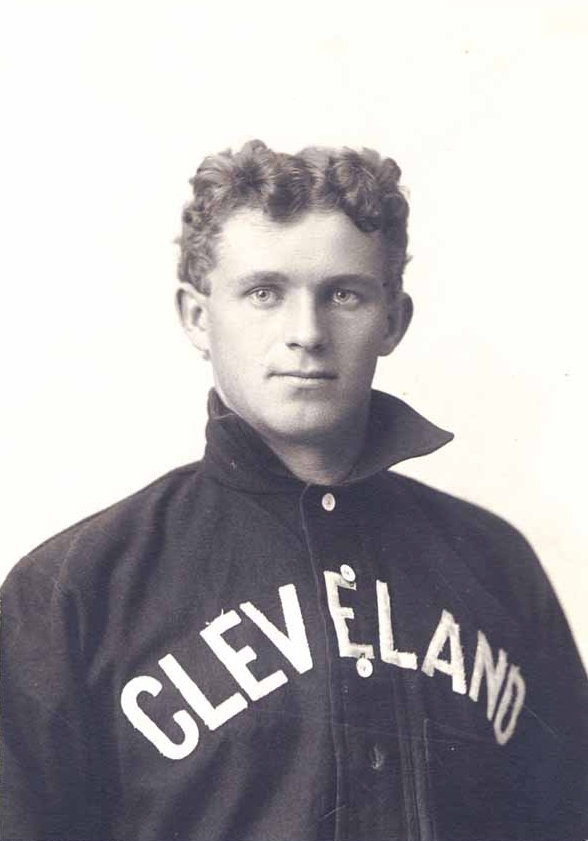
- Pitcher
- Born: October 10, 1878; Berne, Switzerland
- Died: February 25, 1926 (aged 47); Tucson, Arizona, U.S.
- Batted: Left Threw: Left

Major league debut
- August 3, 1902, for the Cleveland Bronchos

Last major league appearance
- June 13, 1915, for the Boston Braves

Major league statistics
- Win–loss record: 70–90
- Earned run average: 2.98
- Strikeouts: 580
- Stats at Baseball Reference

Teams
- Cleveland Bronchos/Naps (1902, 1904‍–‍1908); Boston Braves (1912–1915)

Career highlights and awards
- World Series champion (1914)

Otto C. Hess (October 10, 1878 – February 25, 1926) was an American professional baseball pitcher for the Cleveland Bronchos/Cleveland Naps (1902 and 1904–1908) and Boston Braves (1912–1915).

In 1914, Hess was a member of the Braves team that went from last place to first place in two months, becoming the first team to win a pennant after being in last place on the Fourth of July. Born in Berne, Hess is the only person born in Switzerland to play major league baseball.

In 10 seasons he had a 70-90 win–loss record in 198 games, with 165 games started, 129 complete games, 18 shutouts, 5 saves, 1,418 innings pitched, 1,355 hits allowed, 663 runs allowed, 25 home runs allowed, 448 walks allowed, 580 strikeouts, 83 hit batsmen, 38 wild pitches and a 2.98 ERA.

Hess was a good hitting pitcher in his major league career, posting a .216 batting average (154-for-714) with 63 runs, 21 doubles, 9 triples, 5 home runs, 56 RBI and 27 bases on balls. He also played 51 games in the outfield and 6 games at first base.

Hess died in Tucson, Arizona on February 26, 1926 due to complications from tuberculosis that he contracted while serving in France during the First World War.

== See also ==
- List of Major League Baseball annual saves leaders
- List of Major League Baseball career hit batsmen leaders
