= Lefty Tyler =

American baseball player (1889–1953)

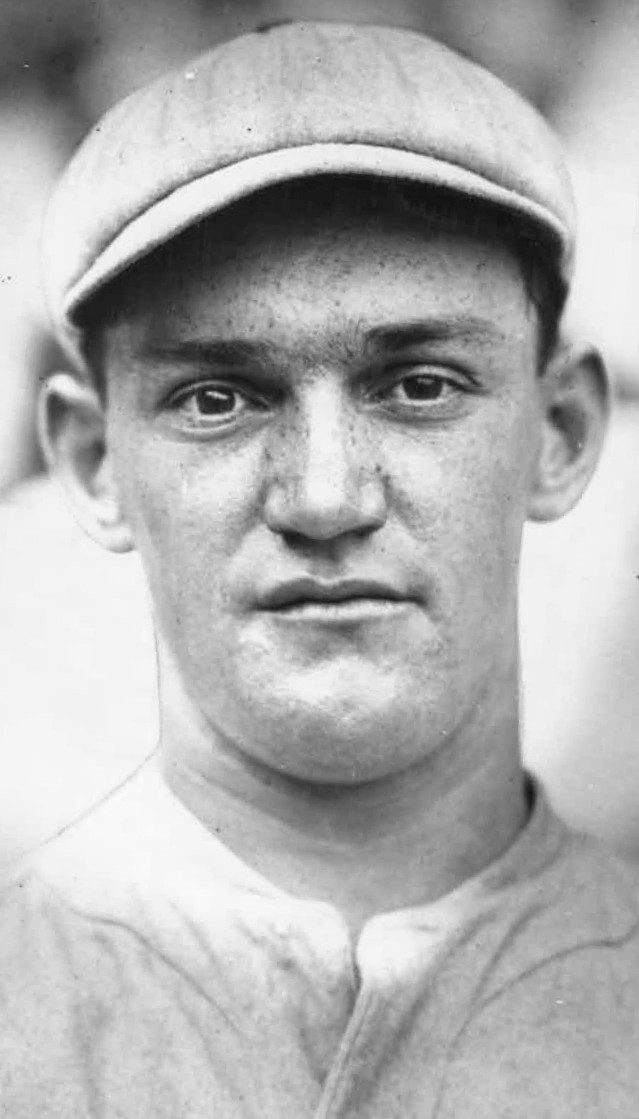
- Pitcher
- Born: December 14, 1889; Derry, New Hampshire, U.S.
- Died: September 29, 1953 (aged 63); Lowell, Massachusetts, U.S.
- Batted: Left Threw: Left

MLB debut
- September 20, 1910, for the Boston Doves

Last MLB appearance
- July 20, 1921, for the Chicago Cubs

MLB statistics
- Win–loss record: 127–116
- Earned run average: 2.95
- Strikeouts: 1,003
- Stats at Baseball Reference

Teams
- Boston Doves/Rustlers/Braves (1910–1917); Chicago Cubs (1918–1921)

Career highlights and awards
- World Series champion (1914)

George Albert "Lefty" Tyler (December 14, 1889 – September 29, 1953) was an American professional baseball pitcher from 1910 to 1921.

From 1910 to 1917, Tyler played with the Boston Doves/Braves. He performed well, having an earned run average (ERA) under 3 in all but two years. In 1918, Tyler was traded to the Chicago Cubs for Larry Doyle, Art Wilson, and $15,000. Tyler did well in Chicago as well, having ERA's under 4.

Tyler's career earned run average was 2.95. His brother, Fred Tyler, played in the major leagues in 1914 as a catcher.

In 1914, Tyler was a member of the Braves team that went from last place to first place in two months, becoming the first team to win a pennant after being in last place on the Fourth of July. The team then went on to defeat Connie Mack's heavily favored Philadelphia Athletics in the 1914 World Series.

In 1916, the New York Giants set the current record of 26 consecutive wins without a defeat: Tyler beat them to end the streak on September 30, 1916.

He was the winning pitcher in Game 2 of the 1918 World Series for the Cubs, as well as the hard-luck loser of a 2-1 decision in Game 6, the last game of the Series; it was the last win for the opposing Boston Red Sox until 2004.

Tyler was a better than average hitting pitcher in his 12-year major league career, compiling a .217 batting average (189-for-870) with 85 runs, 4 home runs and 73 RBI. He recorded a career-high 20 RBI as a member of the 1916 Boston Braves.
