= Herbie Moran =

American baseball player (1884–1954)

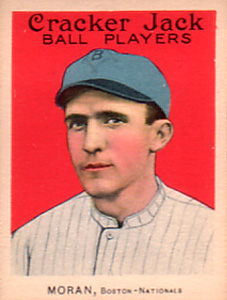
- Outfielder
- Born: February 16, 1884; Costello, Pennsylvania, U.S.
- Died: September 21, 1954 (aged 70); Clarkson, New York, U.S.
- Batted: Left Threw: Right

MLB debut
- April 16, 1908, for the Philadelphia Athletics

Last MLB appearance
- October 7, 1915, for the Boston Braves

MLB statistics
- Batting average: .242
- Home runs: 2
- Runs batted in: 135
- Stats at Baseball Reference

Teams
- Philadelphia Athletics (1908); Boston Doves (1908–1910); Brooklyn Dodgers (1912–1913); Cincinnati Reds (1914); Boston Braves (1914–1915)

Career highlights and awards
- World Series champion (1914)

John Herbert "Herbie" Moran (February 16, 1884 – September 21, 1954) was an American professional baseball outfielder. He played in Major League Baseball (MLB) for the Philadelphia Athletics, Boston Doves, Brooklyn Dodgers, Cincinnati Reds, and Boston Braves between 1908 and 1915.

In 1914, Moran was a member of the Braves team that went from last place to first place in two months, becoming the first team to win a pennant after being in last place on the Fourth of July. The team then went on to defeat Connie Mack's heavily favored Philadelphia Athletics in the 1914 World Series.
