= George Stallings =

American baseball player and manager (1867–1929)

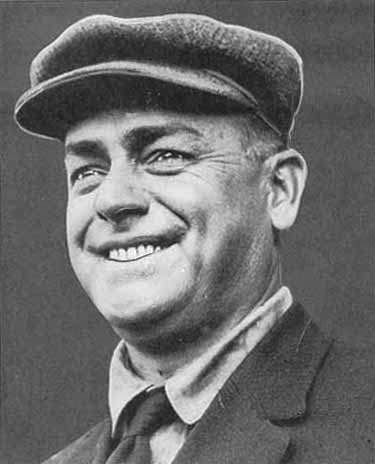
- Catcher / Manager
- Born: November 17, 1867; Augusta, Georgia, U.S.
- Died: May 13, 1929 (aged 61); Haddock, Georgia, U.S.
- Batted: Right Threw: Right

MLB debut
- May 22, 1890, for the Brooklyn Bridegrooms

Last MLB appearance
- August 28, 1898, for the Philadelphia Phillies

MLB statistics
- Batting average: .100
- Home runs: 0
- Runs batted in: 0
- Games managed: 1,813
- Managerial record: 879–898
- Winning %: .495
- Stats at Baseball Reference
- Managerial record at Baseball Reference

Teams
- As player: Brooklyn Bridegrooms (1890); Philadelphia Phillies (1897–1898); As manager: Philadelphia Phillies (1897–1898); Detroit Tigers (1901); New York Highlanders (1909–1910); Boston Braves (1913–1920)

Career highlights and awards
- World Series champion (1914)

George Tweedy Stallings (November 17, 1867 – May 13, 1929) was an American professional baseball catcher and manager. He played in Major League Baseball for the Brooklyn Bridegrooms and Philadelphia Phillies in 1890 and 1897 to 1898 and managed the Phillies, Detroit Tigers, New York Highlanders, and Boston Braves between 1897 and 1920.

Stallings led the 1914 Boston Braves from last place in mid-July to the National League championship and a World Series sweep of the powerful Philadelphia Athletics – resulted in a nickname he would bear for the rest of his life: "The Miracle Man."

== Playing career ==
Stallings was born on November 17, 1867, in Augusta, Georgia. Stallings graduated from the Virginia Military Institute in 1886. He entered medical school, but was instead offered a contract by Harry Wright, manager of the Philadelphia Phillies. He was cut in spring training. Stallings was a mediocre player: he appeared in only seven major league games as a catcher, first baseman and outfielder with Brooklyn (1890) and the Phillies (1897–98) and had only two hits in 20 at-bats, hitting a weak .100.

== Managerial career ==
As a manager, he had a mixed major league resume prior to 1914: a poor record with the Phillies (1897–98), then mild successes in the American League with the Detroit Tigers (1901) and New York Highlanders (1909–10). In the minor leagues, he managed the 1895 Nashville Seraphs to win the Southern League pennant; he also played an infield position on the team. He also managed Detroit before it became a major league team in part of 1896 and from the end of 1898 through its becoming a charter member of the American League. He was also part-owner of the Tigers during their first season as a major league team.

Named manager of the last-place Braves after the 1912 season, Stallings raised Boston to fifth place in the NL in his first season, 1913, but the Braves were sunk at the bottom of the eight-team league and 11 1/2 games from the frontrunning New York Giants on July 15, 1914, when they began their meteoric rise. With Stallings expertly handling a roster of light hitters (Boston hit only .251 as a team) and relying on pitchers Dick Rudolph and Bill James (who each won 26 games), the Braves won 52 of their final 66 contests to overtake the other seven National League teams and finish 10 1/2 games in front of the second-place Giants. They then defeated the heavily favored Philadelphia Athletics in four straight games to earn the nickname "Miracle Braves."

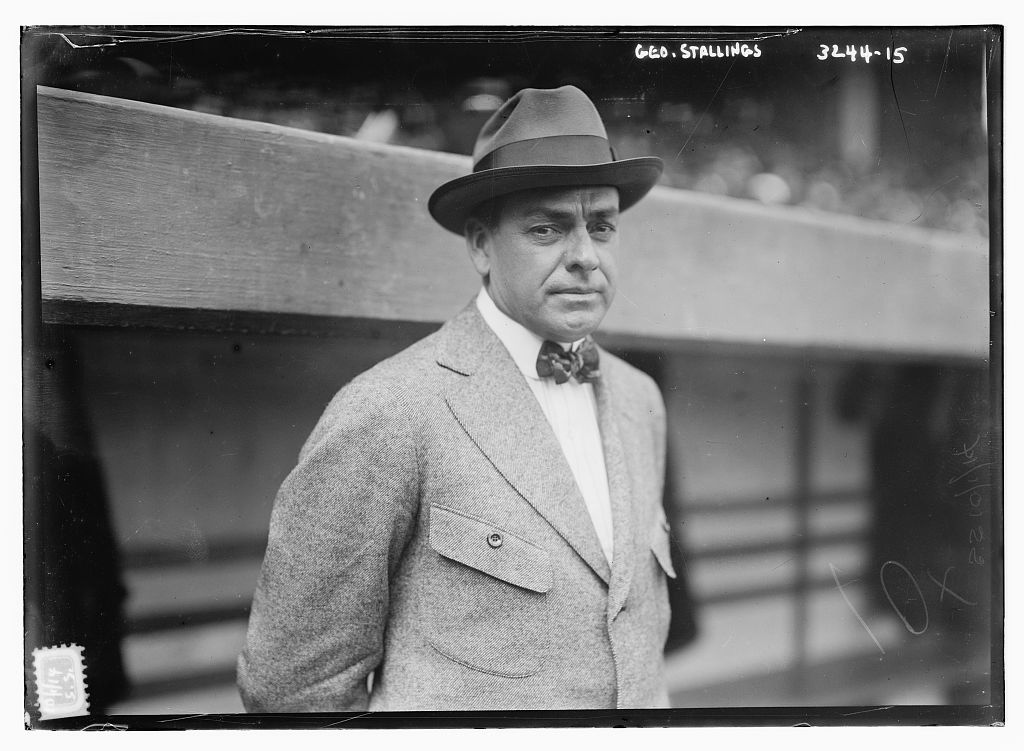
Stallings in 1914

Stallings is credited with being the first manager to use platooning to good effect. It was not strictly left/right hand platooning (there were then relatively few southpaw pitchers), but he did change his lineup significantly when the Braves played a team starting a left-handed pitcher. Bill James credits him with being the first major league manager to use platooning as a weapon, rather than to cover a hitter's weaknesses.

The 1914 championship was the only World Series title earned by the Braves during their tenure in Boston, which lasted through March 1953. It also was Stallings’ first and only big league championship. He managed the Braves through 1920, but posted no winning season after 1916. His career major league managing record was 879 wins, 898 losses (.495) over 13 years.

Stallings was responsible for bringing professional baseball back to the city of Montreal, Quebec. In 1928, his partnership with Montreal lawyer and politician Athanase David and businessman Ernest Savard resurrected the Montreal Royals as part of the International League. They built the modern new Delorimier Stadium in downtown Montreal.

Stallings was famous for his superstitions, and for his nervousness on the bench. He has been described as both "distinguished" and salty-tongued. He died in Haddock, Georgia at age 61 of heart disease. According to legend, when asked by his physician why he had a bad heart, Stallings replied, "Bases on balls, doc ... those damned bases on balls." He was buried in Riverside Cemetery in Macon, Georgia.

=== Managerial record ===
Team	Year	Regular season					Postseason			
Team	Year	Games	Won	Lost	Win %	Finish	Won	Lost	Win %	Result
PHI	1897	134	57	77	.425	10th in NL	–	–	–	–
PHI	1898	46	19	27	.413	fired	–	–	–	–
PHI total		178	74	104	.416		0	0	–	
DET	1901	135	74	61	.548	3rd in AL	–	–	–	–
DET total		135	74	61	.548		0	0	–	
NYH	1909	151	74	77	.490	5th in AL	–	–	–	–
NYH	1910	137	78	59	.569	fired	–	–	–	–
NYH total		288	152	136	.528		0	0	–	
BOB	1913	151	69	82	.457	5th in NL	–	–	–	–
BOB	1914	153	94	59	.614	1st in NL	4	0	1.000	Won World Series (PHA)
BOB	1915	152	83	69	.546	2nd in NL	–	–	–	–
BOB	1916	152	89	63	.586	3rd in NL	–	–	–	–
BOB	1917	153	72	81	.471	6th in NL	–	–	–	–
BOB	1918	124	53	71	.427	7th in NL	–	–	–	–
BOB	1919	139	57	82	.410	6th in NL	–	–	–	–
BOB	1920	152	62	90	.408	7th in NL	–	–	–	–
BOB total		1176	579	597	.492		4	0	1.000	
Total		1777	879	898	.495		4	0	1.000	

== See also ==
- List of Major League Baseball player–managers
