= Tom Hughes (pitcher, born 1884) =

American baseball player

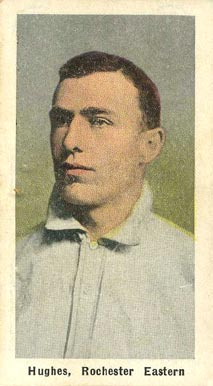
- Pitcher
- Born: January 28, 1884; Coal Creek, Colorado, U.S.
- Died: November 1, 1961 (aged 77); Los Angeles, California, U.S.
- Batted: Right Threw: Right

MLB debut
- September 8, 1906, for the New York Highlanders

Last MLB appearance
- July 17, 1918, for the Boston Braves

MLB statistics
- Win–loss record: 56–39
- Earned run average: 2.56
- Strikeouts: 476
- Stats at Baseball Reference

Teams
- New York Highlanders (1906–1907, 1909–1910); Boston Braves (1914–1918)

Career highlights and awards
- World Series champion (1914); Pitched a no-hitter on June 16, 1916

Thomas L. Hughes (January 28, 1884 – November 1, 1961) was an American right-handed baseball pitcher for the New York Highlanders (1906–07 and 1909–1910) and Boston Braves (1914–1918). He was the brother of major league pitcher Ed Hughes.

== Career ==
Hughes attended high school in Salida, Colorado, and was nicknamed "Salida Tom". He led the National League in games (50), saves (9), and games finished (22) in 1915; he led the National League in won-loss percentage (.842) in 1916.

On August 30, 1910, Hughes took a no-hitter into the 10th inning, before allowing a single to Cleveland's Harry Niles. On June 16, 1916, Hughes successfully completed a no-hitter, against the Pittsburgh Pirates at Braves Field; he struck out future Hall-of-Famer Honus Wagner for the final out.

Hughes' accomplishments include being the Braves franchise career leader in WHIP (1.022) and hits allowed per nine innings (6.77). He helped the Braves win the 1914 World Series. In nine seasons, Hughes had a 56–39 win–loss record, while appearing in 160 games and pitching 863 innings; he had a 2.56 ERA and 476 strikeouts.

Hughes died after a lengthy illness in Los Angeles, California at the age of 77 on November 1, 1961. His son, Tom Hughes, Jr., died in an automobile accident in 1955.

== See also ==
- List of Major League Baseball annual saves leaders
- List of Major League Baseball no-hitters

Preceded by Dave Davenport	No-hitter pitcher June 16, 1916	Succeeded by Rube Foster
