= Gowdy Field =

Business park in Columbus, Ohio

Gowdy Field is a former garden, athletic field, landfill, and now business park located in Columbus, Ohio.

The land was originally annexed in 1921. The site is situated on the west side of Olentangy River Road near the Goodale interchange, just west of State Route 315, south of 3rd Avenue and east of the CSX railroad tracks. In its time, the field has served as a community garden, baseball fields and city landfill. In the early 1900s, it served as a model community garden that provided food to approximately 250 poor families before and after the Great Depression. From the mid-1940s to the mid-1960s, the site was known as Goodale Field and featured more than 20 baseball diamonds. On Dec. 15, 1952, Columbus City Council renamed it Gowdy Field after the city's most famous baseball player and war veteran, Hank Gowdy. On Dec. 15, 1964, Columbus City Council passed a resolution allowing the city's Service Department to use the field as a landfill. It was then filled with construction debris and trash for approximately two decades. It was later covered in dirt and became a weedlot. Site conditions and pedestrian safety concerns had rendered the land unusable as a recreational field. Therefore, the City determined that the highest and best use for Gowdy Field would be commercial office space. A $20 million office project for Time Warner Cable became the first new office tower on the site followed by the Ohio State's Eye and Ear Institute and then the Stefanie Spielman Comprehensive Breast Center part of the James Cancer Hospital.
