= Bruce Kuklick =

American historian (born 1941)

Bruce Kuklick (/ˈkʊklɪk/ KUUK-lik; born March 13, 1941, in Philadelphia, Pennsylvania) is an American historian. He currently serves as the Nichols Professor of American History at the University of Pennsylvania, specializing in diplomatic and intellectual history of the United States and the history of philosophy.

He has written several books on those subjects, including Black Philosopher, White Academy: The Career of William Fontaine, which was described as "a biography of Fontaine is as good a story as that life itself."

== Selected publications ==
- American policy and the Division of Germany: the clash with Russia over Reparations. 1972.
- To Every Thing a Season: Shibe Park and Urban Philadelphia, 1909-1976. Princeton, NJ: Princeton University Press. 1991.
- Puritans in Babylon – the Ancient Near East & American Intellectual Life 1880–1930: The Ancient Near East and American Intellectual Life, 1880-1930. 1996.
- Black Philosopher, White Academy: The Career of William Fontaine. Philadelphia, PA: University of Pennsylvania Press. 2008.
- Death in the Congo: Murdering Patrice Lumumba. Co-authored with Emmanuel Gerard. Cambridge, MA: Harvard University Press. 2015.
