= Charlie Deal =

American baseball player (1891–1979)

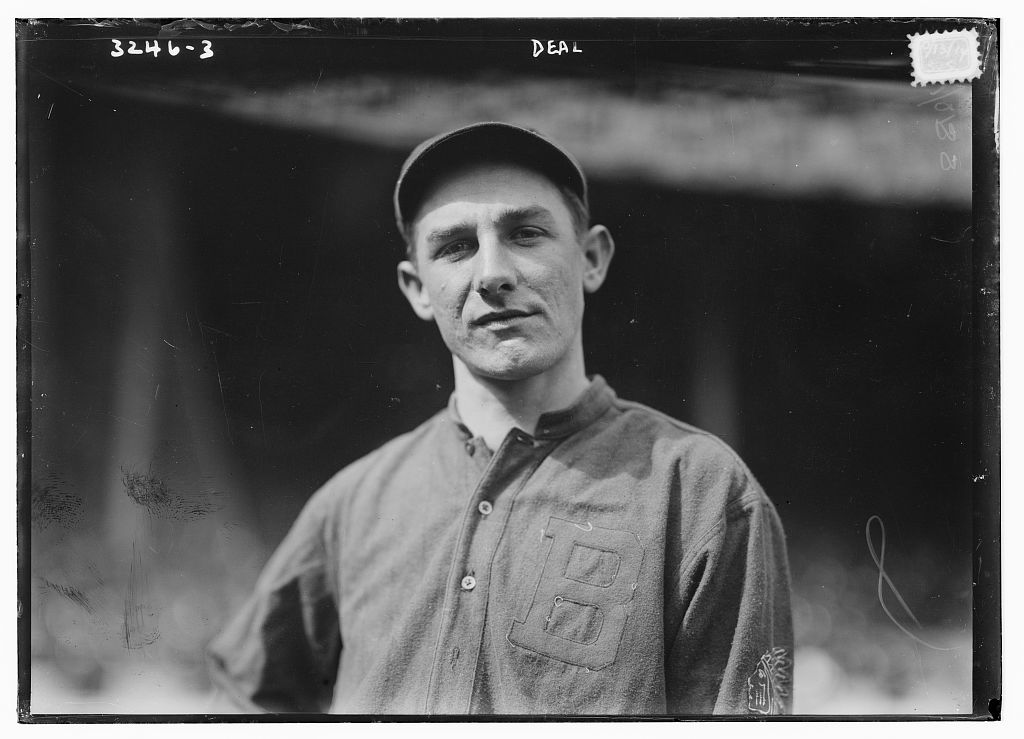
- Third baseman
- Born: October 30, 1891; Wilkinsburg, Pennsylvania, U.S.
- Died: September 16, 1979 (aged 87); Covina, California, U.S.
- Batted: Right Threw: Right

MLB debut
- July 17, 1912, for the Detroit Tigers

Last MLB appearance
- October 2, 1921, for the Chicago Cubs

MLB statistics
- Batting average: .257
- Home runs: 11
- Runs batted in: 318
- Stats at Baseball Reference

Teams
- Detroit Tigers (1912–1913); Boston Braves (1913–1914); St. Louis Terriers (1915); St. Louis Browns (1916); Chicago Cubs (1916–1921)

Career highlights and awards
- World Series champion (1914)

Charles Albert Deal (October 30, 1891 – September 16, 1979) was an American professional baseball player who played third base in the Major Leagues from 1912 to 1921. He would play for the Chicago Cubs, Boston Braves, St. Louis Browns, St. Louis Terriers, and Detroit Tigers.

Charlie Deal was born in Wilkinsburg, Pennsylvania, the fifth of six children of Joseph Calvin and Alice (née Ling) Deal. While working as a fitter for an electric company, Deal would play second base for local semi-professional clubs. On July 19, 1912, Deal made his professional debut with the Detroit Tigers. In 1914, Deal was a member of the Braves team that went from last place to first place in two months, becoming the first team to win a pennant after being in last place on the Fourth of July. The team then went on to defeat Connie Mack's heavily favored Philadelphia Athletics in the 1914 World Series. When his request for a salary increase for 1915 was rejected, Deal jumped to the Federal League, playing for the St. Louis Terriers. Deal only played 65 games for the Terriers, due to being hospitalised with a bout of typhoid fever.

In 1917 Deal led the National League in sacrifice hits with 29. He also proved to be very reliable defensively, leading National League third baseman in fielding three years in a row (1919–1921). Deal then played for several teams in the Pacific Coast League in the mid-1920s, before ending his career at Chattanooga in the Southern Association in 1927.

He was the last surviving member of the 1914 World Champion Boston Braves.
