= Lefty Gervais =

American baseball player (1890-1950)

- Pitcher
- Born: July 6, 1890; Grover, Wisconsin, U.S.
- Died: October 19, 1950 (aged 60); Los Angeles, California, U.S.
- Batted: Left Threw: Left

MLB debut
- April 17, 1913, for the Boston Braves

Last MLB appearance
- May 12, 1913, for the Boston Braves

MLB statistics
- Win–loss record: 0-1
- Earned run average: 5.74
- Strikeouts: 1
- Stats at Baseball Reference

Teams
- Boston Braves (1913)

Lucien Edward "Lefty" Gervais (July 6, 1890 – October 19, 1950) was an American pitcher in Major League Baseball. He played for the Boston Braves in 1913.
