= Joe Connolly (1910s outfielder) =

American baseball player (1884-1943)

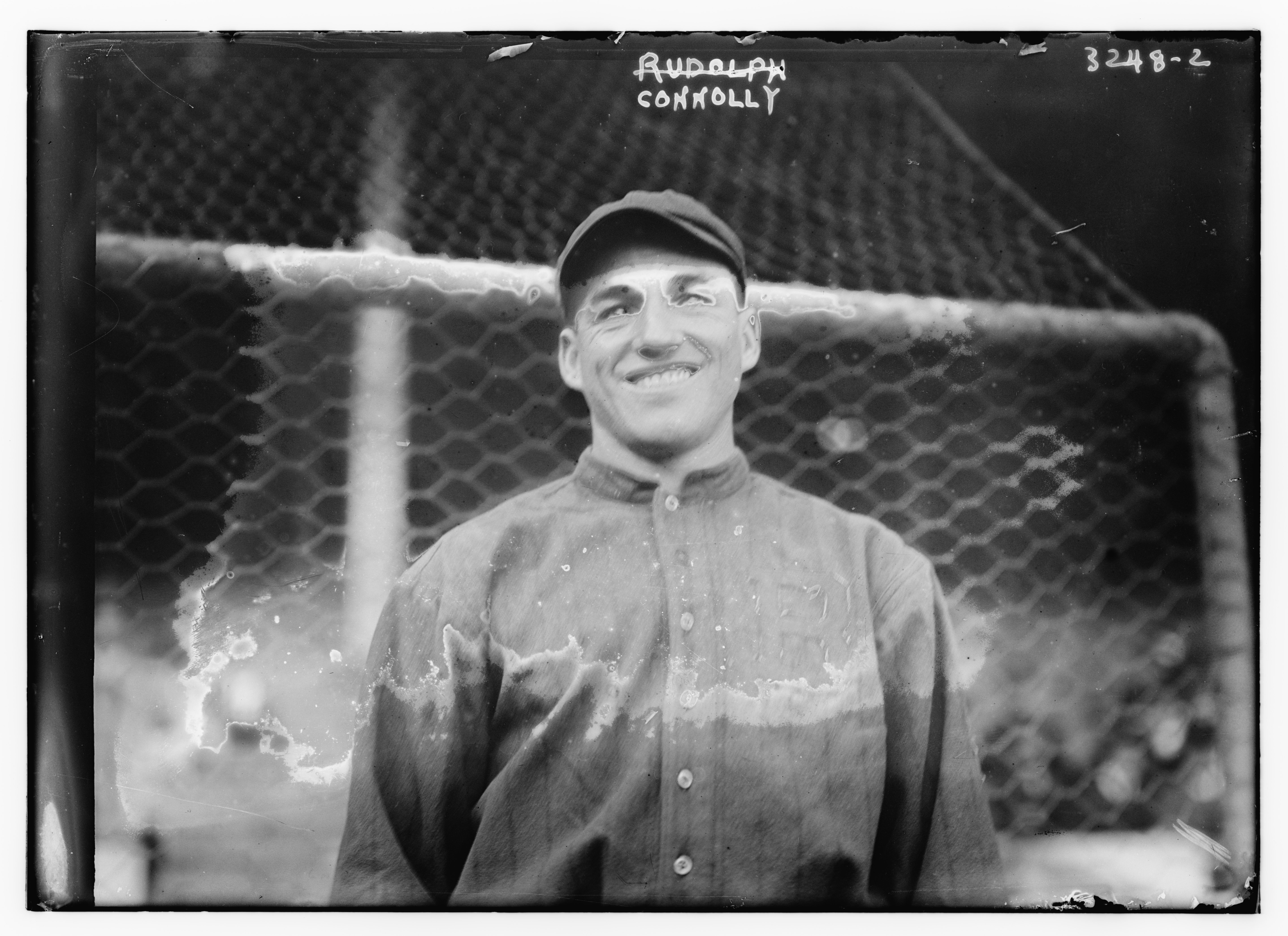
- Left fielder
- Born: February 1, 1884; North Smithfield, Rhode Island, U.S.
- Died: September 1, 1943 (aged 59); North Smithfield, Rhode Island, U.S.
- Batted: Left Threw: Right

MLB debut
- April 10, 1913, for the Boston Braves

Last MLB appearance
- October 5, 1916, for the Boston Braves

MLB statistics
- Batting average: .288
- Home runs: 14
- Runs batted in: 157
- Stats at Baseball Reference

Teams
- Boston Braves (1913–1916)

Career highlights and awards
- World Series champion (1914)

Joseph Aloysius Connolly (February 1, 1884 – September 1, 1943) was an American left fielder in Major League Baseball who played his entire career for the Boston Braves from 1913 through 1916. Listed at 5 ft 7.5 in (1.71 m), 165 lb., Connolly batted left-handed and threw right-handed.

A native of North Smithfield, Rhode Island, Connolly was a prominent member of the 1914 Boston Braves World Champions.

Connolly made his professional debut as a pitcher in 1906 with the Putnam, Connecticut team of the New England League. From 1908 to 1912, he divided his playing time with Class-A Little Rock and Class-B Zanesville teams, playing some outfield when he was not pitching. In 1909, while in Zanesville, he posted a 23–8 record and hit .308 during the season. The following year, despite he pitched for a sixth-place team that ended 16 games below .500, he went 16–17, including a no-hitter, a one-hitter, a two-hitter, and four three-hitters. In 1911 he played exclusively at left field, then was sent to Terre Haute, Indiana based Terre Haute Miners of the Central League, as he led the league hitters with a .355 batting average, adding 27 stolen bases. The Chicago Cubs signed Connolly and then assigned him to the Montreal Royals of the International League, where he hit .316 in 1912. Drafted by the Washington Senators of Clark Griffith in 1913, he was sold immediately to the Boston Braves, to become the team's regular left fielder. Thought his rookie Major League season ended prematurely when he broke his ankle, Connolly led the Braves in average (.281), runs (79), RBI (57), triples (11), and slugging percentage (.410), in 126 games played.

In 1914, Connolly was a member of the Braves team that went from last place to first place in two months, becoming the first team to win a pennant after being in last place on the Fourth of July. He was the offensive star of the 1914 Braves, playing predominantly against right-handed pitching and usually batting third in the order at bat. He led his team with a .306 average (the only regular to hit .300), 28 doubles (fourth in the National League), nine home runs (fifth in the league), and a .494 slugging percentage (third in the league). He hit .111 (1-9) with a run and one RBI during the 1914 World Series, as the Braves defeated Connie Mack's heavily favored Philadelphia Athletics in four games.

In a four-season career, Connolly was a .288 hitter (358-for-1241) with 14 home runs and 157 RBI in 412 games, including 202 runs, 65 doubles, 31 triples, and 48 stolen bases. Defensively, he recorded a .967 fielding percentage primarily as a left fielder.

Following his baseball career, Connolly served in the Rhode Island State Legislature. He died in his home town of North Smithfield, Rhode Island at the age of 59.
