= Butch Schmidt =

American baseball player (1886-1952)

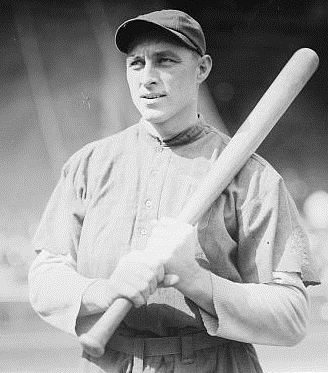
- Schmidt in 1914
- First baseman
- Born: July 19, 1886; Baltimore, Maryland, U.S.
- Died: September 4, 1952 (aged 66); Baltimore, Maryland, U.S.
- Batted: Left Threw: Left

MLB debut
- May 11, 1909, for the New York Highlanders

Last MLB appearance
- September 10, 1915, for the Boston Braves

MLB statistics
- Batting average: .272
- Home runs: 4
- Runs batted in: 145
- Stats at Baseball Reference

Teams
- New York Highlanders (1909); Boston Braves (1913–1915)

Career highlights and awards
- World Series champion (1914)

Charles John "Butch" Schmidt (July 19, 1886 – September 4, 1952) was an American Major League Baseball infielder who played from 1909 to 1915 for the Boston Braves and New York Highlanders.

In 1914, Schmidt was a member of the Braves team that went from last place to first place in two months, becoming the first team to win a pennant after being in last place on the Fourth of July. The team then went on to defeat Connie Mack's heavily favored Philadelphia Athletics in the 1914 World Series.

In 297 games over four seasons, Schmidt posted a .272 batting average (292-for-1075) with 119 runs, 4 home runs, 145 RBI and 81 bases on balls. He finished his career with a .988 fielding percentage as a first baseman. In the 1914 World Series, he hit .294 (5-for-17) with 2 runs and 2 RBI.
