= Bill Calhoun (baseball) =

American baseball player (1890-1955)

- First baseman
- Born: June 23, 1890; Rockmart, Georgia, U.S.
- Died: January 28, 1955 (aged 64); Sandersville, Georgia, U.S.
- Batted: Left Threw: Left

MLB debut
- April 24, 1913, for the Boston Braves

Last MLB appearance
- June 2, 1913, for the Boston Braves

MLB statistics
- Batting average: .077
- Home runs: 0
- Runs batted in: 0
- Stats at Baseball Reference

Teams
- Boston Braves (1913)

William Davitte "Mary" Calhoun (June 23, 1890 – January 28, 1955) was an American former Major League Baseball player who played six games, all at first base, for the Boston Braves in 1913.
