= Oscar Dugey =

American baseball player (1887-1966)

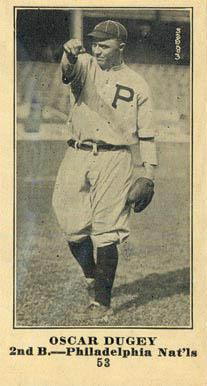
- Second baseman
- Born: October 25, 1887; Palestine, Texas, U.S.
- Died: January 1, 1966 (aged 78); Dallas, Texas, U.S.
- Batted: Right Threw: Right

MLB debut
- September 13, 1913, for the Boston Braves

Last MLB appearance
- August 25, 1920, for the Boston Braves

MLB statistics
- Batting average: .194
- Hits: 54
- Stolen bases: 20
- Stats at Baseball Reference

Teams
- Boston Braves (1913–14, 1920); Philadelphia Phillies (1915–17)

Oscar Joseph Dugey (October 25, 1887 – January 1, 1966) was an American Major League Baseball player. He played all or part of six seasons in the majors, between 1913 and 1920, for the Boston Braves and Philadelphia Phillies. He played mostly at second base, but also appeared in 20 games at third base. He was a member of the Braves team during the 1914 season, which saw the "Miracle Braves" win the World Series after being in last place in July. Following his playing career, Dugey was a coach for the Braves and Chicago Cubs.
