= Rex DeVogt =

American baseball player (1888-1935)

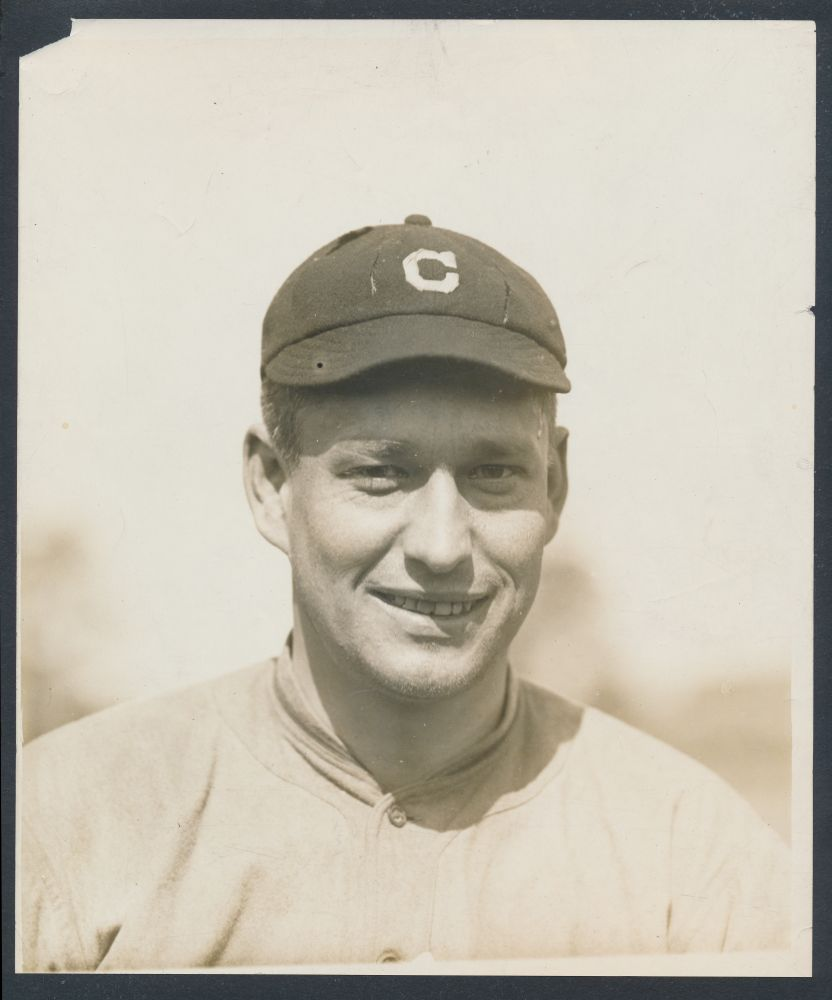
- Catcher
- Born: January 4, 1888; Clare, Michigan
- Died: November 9, 1935 (aged 47); Alma, Michigan
- Batted: Right Threw: Right

MLB debut
- April 17, 1913, for the Boston Braves

Last MLB appearance
- April 23, 1913, for the Boston Braves

MLB statistics
- Batting average: .000
- Home runs: 0
- Runs batted in: 0
- At-bats: 6
- Stats at Baseball Reference

Teams
- Boston Braves (1913)

Rex Eugene DeVogt (January 4, 1888 – November 9, 1935) was a Major League Baseball player. He played three games with the Boston Braves between April 17 and April 23, 1913.
