= Jeff McCleskey =

American baseball player (1891–1971)

- Third baseman
- Born: November 6, 1891; Americus, Georgia, U.S.
- Died: May 11, 1971 (aged 79); Americus, Georgia, U.S.
- Batted: Left Threw: Right

MLB debut
- September 8, 1913, for the Boston Braves

Last MLB appearance
- September 13, 1913, for the Boston Braves

MLB statistics
- Batting average: .000
- Home runs: 0
- Runs batted in: 0
- On-base percentage: .250
- Stats at Baseball Reference

Teams
- Boston Braves (1913)

Jefferson Lamar McCleskey (November 6, 1891 – May 11, 1971) was an American Major League Baseball player. He played one season with the Boston Braves from September 8 to September 13, 1913.
