= Rabbit Maranville =

American baseball player and manager (1891–1954)

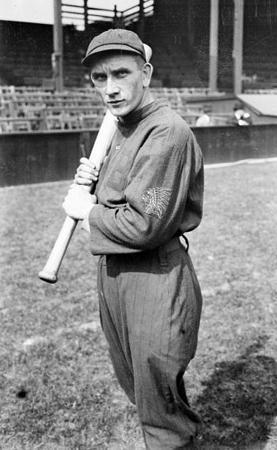
- Maranville in 1914
- Shortstop / Second baseman / Manager
- Born: November 11, 1891; Springfield, Massachusetts, U.S.
- Died: January 6, 1954 (aged 62); Woodside, New York, U.S.
- Batted: Right Threw: Right

MLB debut
- September 10, 1912, for the Boston Braves

Last MLB appearance
- September 29, 1935, for the Boston Braves

MLB statistics
- Batting average: .258
- Hits: 2,605
- Home runs: 28
- Runs batted in: 884
- Stats at Baseball Reference
- Managerial record at Baseball Reference

Teams
- As player: Boston Braves (1912–1920); Pittsburgh Pirates (1921–1924); Chicago Cubs (1925); Brooklyn Robins (1926); St. Louis Cardinals (1927–1928); Boston Braves (1929–1933, 1935); As manager: Chicago Cubs (1925)

Career highlights and awards
- World Series champion (1914); Braves Hall of Fame

Member of the National

Baseball Hall of Fame
- Induction: 1954
- Vote: 82.9% (14th ballot)

Walter James Vincent "Rabbit" Maranville (November 11, 1891 – January 6, 1954) was an American professional baseball shortstop, second baseman and manager. He played in Major League Baseball (MLB) for the Boston Braves, Pittsburgh Pirates, Chicago Cubs, Brooklyn Robins, and St. Louis Cardinals between 1912 and 1934. At the time of his retirement in 1935, he had played in a record 23 seasons in the National League, a mark which was not broken until 1986 by Pete Rose.

Maranville was inducted into the Baseball Hall of Fame in 1954, mainly on the strength of his defensive abilities.

== Career ==
Maranville finished third in the MVP voting in his first full season, playing for the Boston Braves as a 21-year-old in 1913 even though his batting average was just .247 in 143 games with two homers. The following year, Maranville was the runner-up in the MVP voting to teammate Johnny Evers as the Braves won the National League pennant and then went on to sweep the powerful Philadelphia A's in the World Series. That year, Maranville was the Braves' cleanup hitter, despite batting just .246 and hitting four home runs. Following the series, he and several of his teammates went on a vaudeville tour, reenacting plays from the World Series while also singing and telling stories. Maranville was demonstrating a stolen base to an audience in Lewiston, Maine, when he accidentally slid off the edge of the stage and fell onto a drum in the orchestra pit, suffering a broken leg. Maranville played only 11 games in 1918, spending most of the year in the United States Navy during World War I.

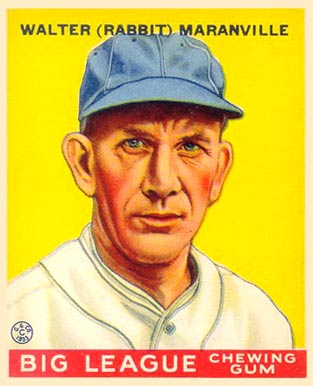
Goudey baseball card of Walter "Rabbit" Maranville, 1933

Maranville threw and batted right-handed; he stood 5 ft 5 in (1.65 m) tall and weighed 155 lb (70 kg). Over a lengthy career which spanned both the dead ball and live-ball era, he played for the Boston Braves (1912–1920, 1929–1933, 1935), Pittsburgh Pirates (1921–1924), Chicago Cubs (1925), Brooklyn Robins (1926) and St. Louis Cardinals (1927–1928). He retired having compiled a .258 batting average, 2,605 hits, 1,255 runs, 28 home runs, 884 RBI and 291 stolen bases. As a shortstop, he finished his career with a positional record 5,139 putouts. He moved to second base in 1924 after the Pirates installed Glenn Wright at the shortstop position. He won his only World Series championship in 1914 as a member of the Braves, and won his only other National League championship in 1928 as a member of the Cardinals.

Maranville was known as one of "baseball's most famous clowns" due to his practical jokes and lack of inhibitions. He used to don a pair of glasses to make fun of umpires and mimic the actions of hitters or pitchers who took an especially long time to get ready. Other stunts he pulled included throwing firecrackers, stepping out on hotel ledges, and swallowing goldfish. On a road trip to New York, Maranville had teammate Jack Scott cry "Stop, thief!" as Scott chased him through Times Square. Another time, his concerned teammates broke into his hotel room after hearing screams, breaking glass, and gunshots emanating from within, as well as Maranville groaning, "Eddie, you're killing me!" An unharmed Maranville and two friends greeted the players like nothing was wrong as they wandered out of the room. When Maranville was appointed manager of the Chicago Cubs in 1925—one of their worst seasons ever—he continued to demonstrate his wild behavior. His only rule with the team was that none of the players could go to bed before he did. One night he walked through a Pullman car, dumping water on sleeping players' heads, saying, "No sleeping under Maranville management, especially at night." After 53 games with him as the manager, the Cubs were in last place with a 23–30 record. Not long after that, he was out on the street outside Ebbets Field in Brooklyn mimicking a newsboy hawking papers. He cried out, "Read all about it! Maranville fired!" And so he was—the next day.

1926 was a struggle for Maranville. Having been claimed off waivers by the Brooklyn Robins, he spent the first half of the season with them but was released halfway through the year. The Cardinals signed him that November but assigned him to the Rochester Tribe of the International League in 1927. Maranville realized he would have to make a change in his lifestyle if he wanted to continue playing in the major leagues. "Either I had to lay off the booze and get serious with the game or it would be the end of me."

On May 24, 1927, Maranville resolved to stop drinking. Later that year, Cardinals general manager Branch Rickey stated, "Walter is a changed man ... it is apparent that he has seen the light ... his change in attitude is remarkable." Called up by St. Louis at the end of the year, he played in nine games for them in late September before spending all of 1928 on their roster.

Even at age 41, when Maranville batted .218 in 143 games and hit no homers, he finished in a tie for 12th in the 1933 NL MVP voting. He missed the entire 1934 season after breaking his left fibula and tibia in a collision at home plate during an exhibition game. Maranville attempted a comeback in 1935 but was unable to play like he used to.

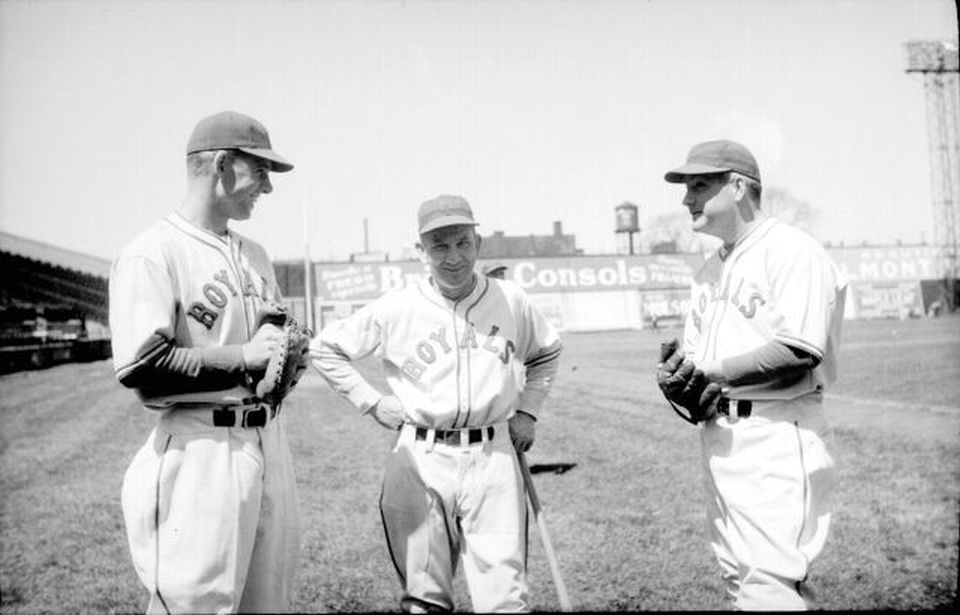
Rabbit Maranville (center) when manager of the Montreal Royals between two players, Norman Kies and Harry Smythe, 1938

Following the end of his major league career, Maranville turned to managing, including stints as a minor league manager for Montreal Royals, at Albany, Elmira, and Springfield, Massachusetts. With Elmira in 1936, he served as a player-manager, batting .323 in 123 games.

After managing in the minor leagues, Maranville was employed by youth baseball programs in Detroit and Rochester. Then, he directed a baseball school sponsored by the New York Journal-American newspaper. He enjoyed working with children and always cautioned them against adopting the same wild lifestyle he had pursued during his earlier career.

== Death and legacy ==
Maranville died as the result of a severe heart attack shortly after midnight on January 6, 1954, at his home in Woodside, New York, where death was nearly instantaneous. He was 62 years old.

Maranville was interred in the Holy Family Section B, Lot 206, Grave 5, of the St. Michael's Cemetery in Springfield, Massachusetts.

Maranville was inducted into the Baseball Hall of Fame in 1954, six months after his death, along with Bill Terry and Bill Dickey, in his 14th year of eligibility.

A street in West Roxbury, Massachusetts is unofficially named for him.

== See also ==
- List of Major League Baseball career hits leaders
- List of Major League Baseball career triples leaders
- List of Major League Baseball career runs scored leaders
- List of Major League Baseball player-managers
