= Hank Gowdy =

American baseball player and manager (1889-1966)

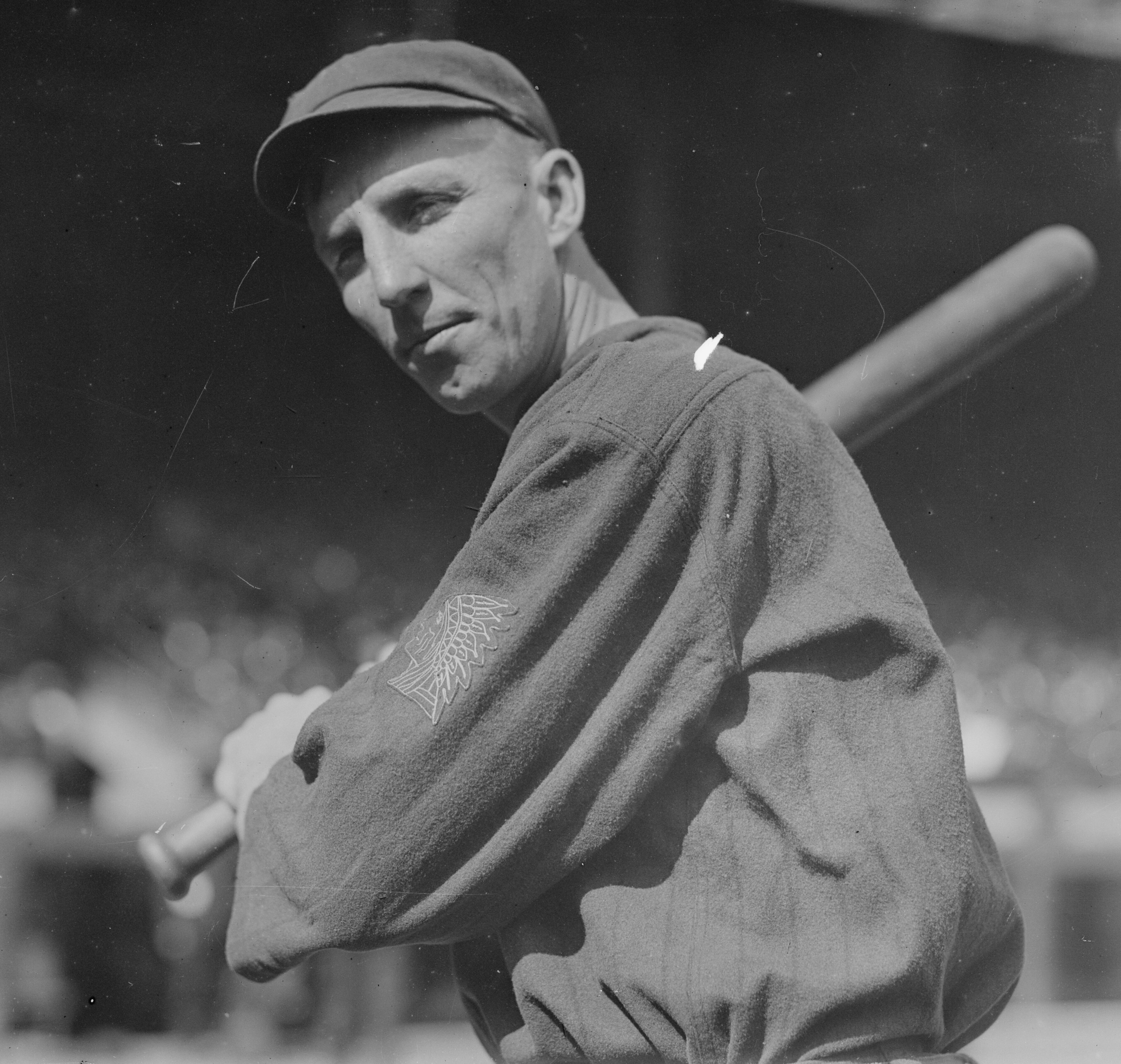
- Gowdy in 1914
- Catcher / First baseman / Manager
- Born: August 24, 1889; Columbus, Ohio, U.S.
- Died: August 1, 1966 (aged 76); Columbus, Ohio, U.S.
- Batted: Right Threw: Right

MLB debut
- September 13, 1910, for the New York Giants

Last MLB appearance
- August 29, 1930, for the Boston Braves

MLB statistics
- Batting average: .270
- Home runs: 21
- Runs batted in: 322
- Stats at Baseball Reference

Teams
- As player: New York Giants (1910–1911); Boston Braves (1911–1917, 1919–1923); New York Giants (1923–1925); Boston Braves (1929–1930); As manager: Cincinnati Reds (1946)

Career highlights and awards
- 2× World Series champion (1914, 1940)

Harry Morgan Gowdy (August 24, 1889 – August 1, 1966) was an American professional baseball player, manager and coach. He played in the Major League Baseball as a catcher and first baseman from 1910 to 1930, most prominently with the Boston Braves where he was a member of the "Miracle" Braves team that went from last place at mid-season to win the 1914 National League pennant and the 1914 World Series. He began his career playing for the New York Giants.

He was the first active major league player to enlist for service in World War I, and the only player to fight in both World War I and World War II.

== Background ==
Gowdy was born in Columbus, Ohio. He graduated from Columbus North High School in 1908.

He and his wife Pauline had no children.

A nephew, Pat Bonaventura, is completing a book about Gowdy's life.

== Major League career ==
Gowdy made his major league debut with John McGraw's New York Giants in 1910, before being traded to Boston the next year. He did not see much playing time and spent the majority of the 1913 season with the Buffalo Bisons in the International League. In 1914, Gowdy became the Braves regular catcher in a year that saw them go from last place to first in two months, becoming the first team to win a pennant after being in last place on the Fourth of July. In the 1914 World Series, he had a .545 batting average, including the only home run of the series, in the historic upset of Connie Mack's Philadelphia Athletics. Gowdy had 50,000 fans celebrate him in a parade in his hometown of Columbus, Ohio that October.

Gowdy saw more playing time in subsequent seasons, but when World War I broke out, he became the first major league player to enlist. He saw considerable action in France with the 166th Infantry Regiment of the Ohio National Guard, including some of the worst trench fighting in the war. When he returned in 1919, he got his old job as catcher back, but not before going on a speaking tour of the United States, detailing his war experiences. Four years later, he was traded back to the Giants, where he played in the 1923 and 1924 World Series, but his heroics weren't repeated, as he committed a costly error which led to the game-winning run in Game 7 of the 1924 series against the Washington Senators. In 1925, the Giants released him. Four years later, he made a comeback with the Braves, albeit with very limited playing time.

== Career statistics ==
In a seventeen-year major league career, Gowdy played in 1,050 games, accumulating 738 hits in 2,735 at bats for a .270 career batting average along with 21 home runs and 322 runs batted in. He ended his career with a .975 fielding percentage. Gowdy twice led the National League in caught stealing percentage. His 52.58% career caught stealing percentage ranks him sixth in major league history. Gowdy's reputation as a defensive stand out is enhanced because of the era in which he played. In the Deadball Era, catchers played a huge defensive role, given the large number of bunts and stolen base attempts, as well as the difficulty of handling the spitball pitchers who dominated pitching staffs.

== Coaching career ==
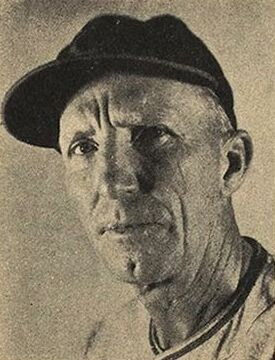
Gowdy as Reds coach

After his playing career was over, he became a coach with the Giants, Braves, and the Reds. When the United States entered World War II, Gowdy enlisted as a Captain at the age of 53 and was later promoted to major. In December 1944, he returned to Fort Benning, where he served as Chief Athletic Officer. The baseball field at Fort Benning bears his name. He returned to coaching in 1946 with the Reds, and he even served as manager for four games at the end of the season. By 1948, he had retired from baseball.

== Unsuccessful Hall of Fame bid ==
Gowdy has the record for most unsuccessful Hall of Fame induction attempts, without ever having been enshrined in the Hall. While current custom limits the times a player can appear on the ballot to 10, Gowdy received votes 17 years, never being elected to the Hall of Fame (Edd Roush has the record for most Hall attempts with 19, but he was later enshrined by the Veteran's Committee).

Gowdy died at his home in Columbus, Ohio at age 76. Gowdy Field in Columbus is named in his honor as is the Columbus chapter of the Society for American Baseball Research.
