= Dick Rudolph =

American baseball player (1887-1949)

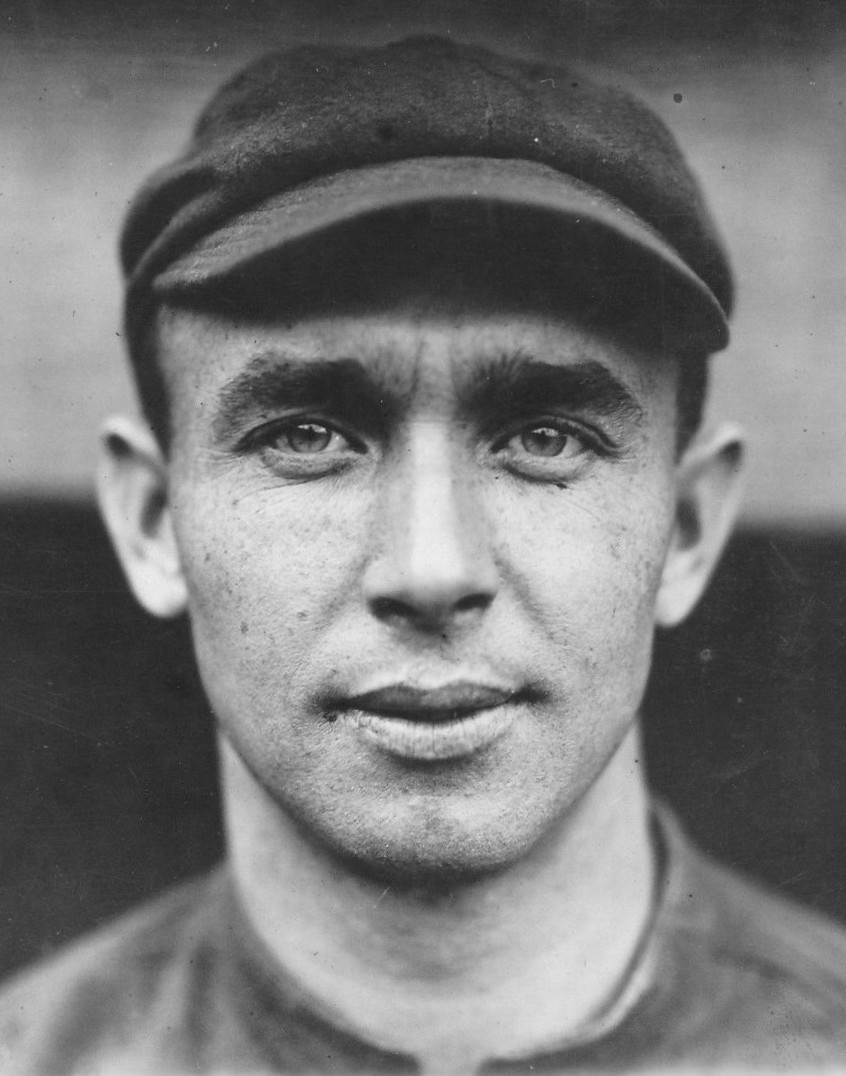
- (circa 1914)
- Pitcher
- Born: August 25, 1887; New York City, New York, U.S.
- Died: October 20, 1949 (aged 62); The Bronx, New York, U.S.
- Batted: Right Threw: Right

MLB debut
- September 30, 1910, for the New York Giants

Last MLB appearance
- September 11, 1927, for the Boston Braves

MLB statistics
- Win–loss record: 121–109
- Earned run average: 2.66
- Strikeouts: 786
- Stats at Baseball Reference

Teams
- New York Giants (1910–1911); Boston Braves (1913–1920, 1922–1923, 1927)

Career highlights and awards
- World Series champion (1914)

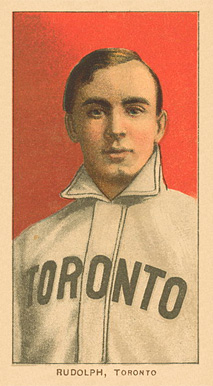
Rudolph's T206 baseball card

Richard Rudolph (August 25, 1887 – October 20, 1949) was an American pitcher in Major League Baseball who played for the New York Giants and Boston Braves through 13 seasons spanning 1910–1927. He attended Fordham University.

Though he stood only 5' 9.5" and weighed just 160 lbs., Rudolph was a large contributor for the 1914 "Miracle Braves" team that went from last place to first place of the National League in two months, becoming the first team to win a pennant after being in last place on the Fourth of July. The Braves then went on to sweep Connie Mack's heavily favored Philadelphia Athletics in the 1914 World Series, becoming the first MLB club ever to win a series in just four games, as Rudolph pitched complete-game victories in Games 1 and 4.

Rudolph won 12 straight games during the regular season. In doing this, he turned in a 12-game consecutive winning streak from July 4 through August 24. Overall, he posted a 26–10 record with a 2.35 ERA in 42 games (36 starts), including 31 complete games and six shutouts in 336.1 innings of work. (A team record that stood until Tom Glavine won 13 straight in 1992). Though Rudolph never reached his 1914 peak again, he collected 22 wins in 1915 and 19 in the next season.

As a hitter, Rudolph posted a .188 batting average (131-for-698) with 46 runs, 2 home runs, 56 RBI, 9 stolen bases and 53 bases on balls. He had 17 RBI for the 1915 Boston Braves. Defensively, he recorded a .970 fielding percentage which was 14 points higher than the league average at his position.

Rudolph is buried at Woodlawn Cemetery in the Bronx.
