= Gene Cocreham =

American baseball player (1884-1945)

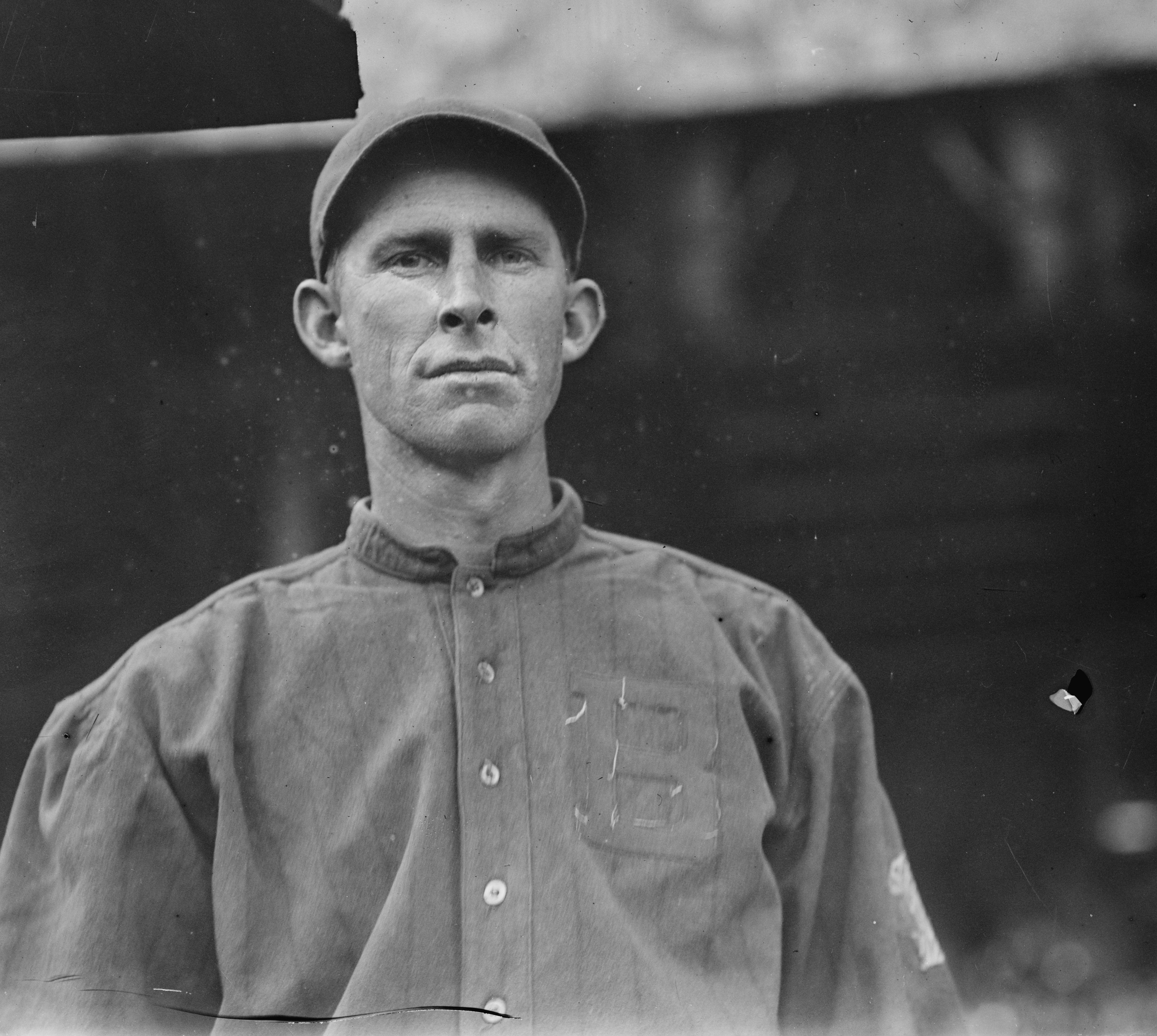
- Pitcher
- Born: November 14, 1884; Luling, Texas
- Died: December 27, 1945 (aged 61); Luling, Texas
- Batted: Right Threw: Right

MLB debut
- September 25, 1913, for the Boston Braves

Last MLB appearance
- April 21, 1915, for the Boston Braves

MLB statistics
- Win–loss record: 3–5
- Strikeouts: 18
- Earned run average: 5.27
- Stats at Baseball Reference

Teams
- Boston Braves (1913–1915)

Eugene Cocreham (November 14, 1884 – December 27, 1945) was a former Major League Baseball pitcher. He played three seasons with the Boston Braves from 1913 to 1915.
