= Bill James (pitcher, born 1892) =

American baseball player

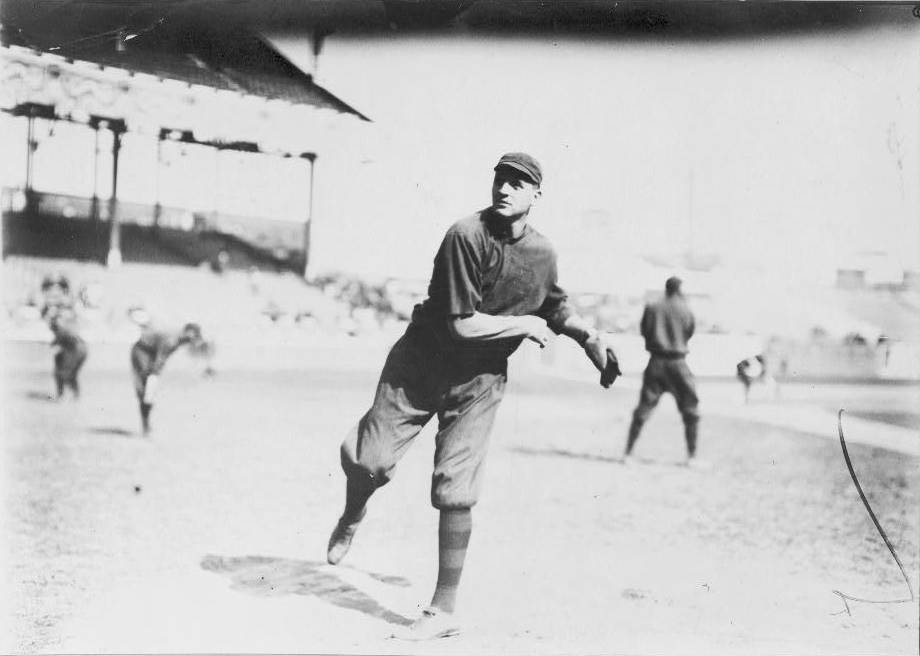
- Pitcher
- Born: March 12, 1892; Iowa Hill, California, U.S.
- Died: March 10, 1971 (aged 78); Oroville, California, U.S.
- Batted: Right Threw: Right

MLB debut
- April 17, 1913, for the Boston Braves

Last MLB appearance
- June 4, 1919, for the Boston Braves

MLB statistics
- Win–loss record: 37–21
- Earned run average: 2.28
- Strikeouts: 253
- Stats at Baseball Reference

Teams
- Boston Braves (1913–1915, 1919)

William Lawrence "Seattle Bill" James (March 12, 1892 – March 10, 1971) was an American Major League Baseball pitcher. He was given a nickname to differentiate him from his contemporary, "Big" Bill James.

The Braves purchased James in 1912 from the Seattle Giants of the Northwestern League. In 1914, James was an integral member of the "Miracle Braves" team that went from last place to first place in two months, becoming the first team to win a pennant after being in last place on the Fourth of July. In his only full season, James posted a record of 26 wins against 7 losses. The Braves then went on to defeat Connie Mack's heavily favored Philadelphia Athletics in the 1914 World Series. James was 2–0 in the World Series as the Braves recorded the first sweep in Series history. His victory in Game Two was a 1-0 shutout.

During World War I, James was an instructor at bomb-throwing for the US Army. He pitched in the minor leagues until 1925.

== Sources ==
- Career statistics from Baseball Reference · Baseball Reference (Minors) · Retrosheet · Baseball Almanac
