= Fred Tyler (baseball) =

American baseball player (1891-1945)

- Catcher
- Born: December 16, 1891; Derry, New Hampshire, U.S.
- Died: October 14, 1945 (aged 53); East Derry, New Hampshire, U.S.
- Batted: Right Threw: Right

MLB debut
- October 3, 1914, for the Boston Braves

Last MLB appearance
- October 6, 1914, for the Boston Braves

MLB statistics
- Batting average: .105
- Home runs: 0
- Runs batted in: 2
- Stats at Baseball Reference

Teams
- Boston Braves (1914)

Frederick Franklin "Clancy" Tyler (December 16, 1891 – October 14, 1945) was an American Major League Baseball player. He played one season with the Boston Braves in 1914.
