= 1914 World Series =

1914 Major League Baseball championship series

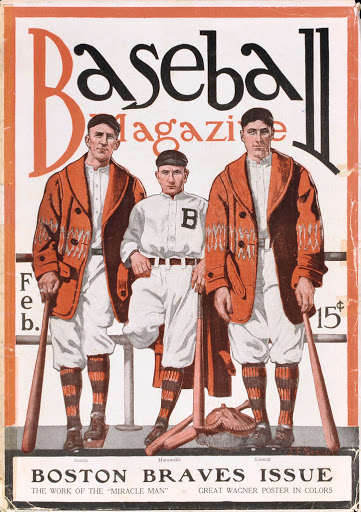
- Baseball Magazine cover, 1914
Team (Wins)	Managers	Season
Boston Braves (4)	George Stallings	94–59, .614, GA: 10 1/2
Philadelphia Athletics (0)	Connie Mack	99–53, .651, GA: 8 1/2
- Dates: October 9–13
- Venue(s): Shibe Park (Philadelphia); Fenway Park (Boston)
- Umpires: Bill Dinneen (AL), Bill Klem (NL), George Hildebrand (AL), Lord Byron (NL)
- Hall of Famers: Umpire: Bill Klem; Braves: Johnny Evers; Rabbit Maranville; Athletics: Connie Mack (mgr.); Frank Baker; Chief Bender; Eddie Collins; Herb Pennock; Eddie Plank

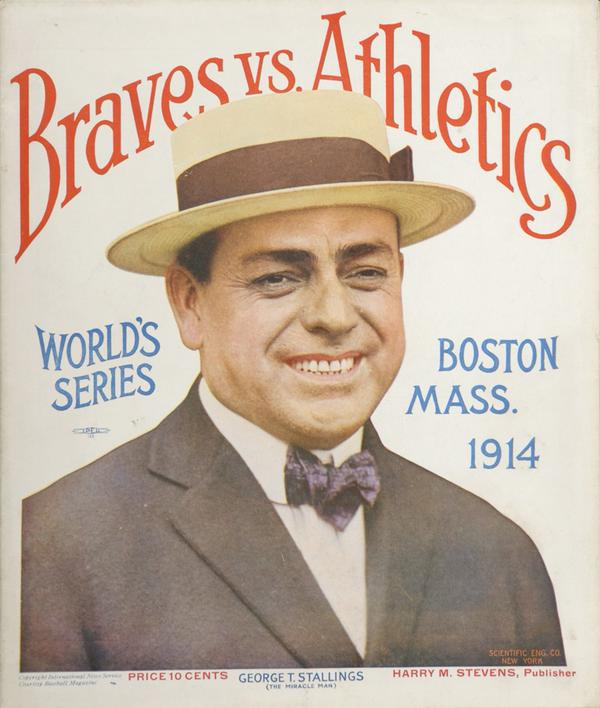
A program from the 1914 World Series, featuring Braves manager George Stallings.

The 1914 World Series was the championship series of Major League Baseball's 1914 season. The 11th edition of the World Series, it was played between the American League (AL) champion and defending World Series champion Philadelphia Athletics and the National League (NL) champion Boston Braves.

The "Miracle Braves" were in last place on July 4, then won the National League pennant by 10 1/2 games. The Braves' relatively unknown starting trio of pitchers, with a combined career record of 285–245, outperformed the Athletics' vaunted rotation (929–654) in all four games. Hank Gowdy hit .545 (6 of 11) with five extra-base hits and also drew five walks for Boston in the series and made the difference in Games 1 and 3.

Adding to their supposed disadvantages, the Braves arguably lacked a notable home-field advantage. They had abandoned their 43-year-old home field South End Grounds in August 1914, choosing to rent from the Boston Red Sox at Fenway Park while awaiting construction of Braves Field (1915). Thus their home games in this Series were also at Fenway.

This was the first official four-game sweep in World Series history. The Chicago Cubs had defeated the Detroit Tigers four games to none in 1907, but Game 1 had ended in a tie before the Cubs won the next four in a row.

At least one publication, To Every Thing a Season by Bruce Kuklick, has suggested other factors that might have contributed to the sweep, noting that some of the A's may have been irritated at the penny-pinching ways of their manager/owner Connie Mack and thus did not play hard, and also noting the heavy wagering against Philadelphia placed by entertainer George M. Cohan through bookmaker Sport Sullivan, who was also implicated in the 1919 Black Sox scandal. Chief Bender and Eddie Plank jumped to the rival Federal League for the 1915 season. Mack unloaded most of his other high-priced stars soon after and, within two years, the A's posted the worst winning percentage in modern history (even worse than the 1962 New York Mets and the 2024 Chicago White Sox).

== Background ==
Because an AL team had won the last four World Series (the A's had represented the AL in three out of those four), the A's were heavily favored. The fact that the Braves had been in last place in July before coming back to win the pennant contributed to the perception that the AL was simply superior to the NL. The A's roster boasted five future Hall of Famers and many agreed they were the better team on paper. A story told about Connie Mack during the 1914 season reflects this attitude among the A's that the Braves would be pushovers. That year, Mack gave star pitcher Chief Bender the week off and told him to scout the Braves personally. Instead, Bender took a vacation. When asked to defend his actions, he replied: "Why should I check out a bunch of bush league hitters?"

== Summary ==
NL Boston Braves (4) vs. AL Philadelphia Athletics (0)

Game	Date	Score	Location	Time	Attendance
1	October 9	Boston Braves – 7, Philadelphia Athletics – 1	Shibe Park	1:58	20,562
2	October 10	Boston Braves – 1, Philadelphia Athletics – 0	Shibe Park	1:56	20,562
3	October 12	Philadelphia Athletics – 4, Boston Braves – 5 (12)	Fenway Park	3:06	35,520
4	October 13	Philadelphia Athletics – 1, Boston Braves – 3	Fenway Park	1:49	34,365

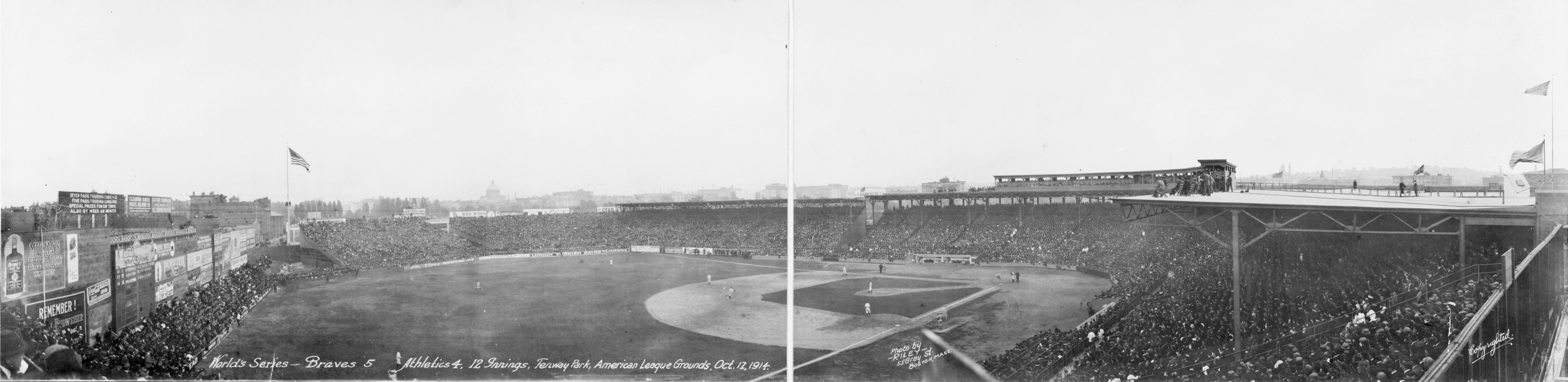
Fenway Park on October 12, 1914, for the third game of the 1914 World Series.

== Matchups ==
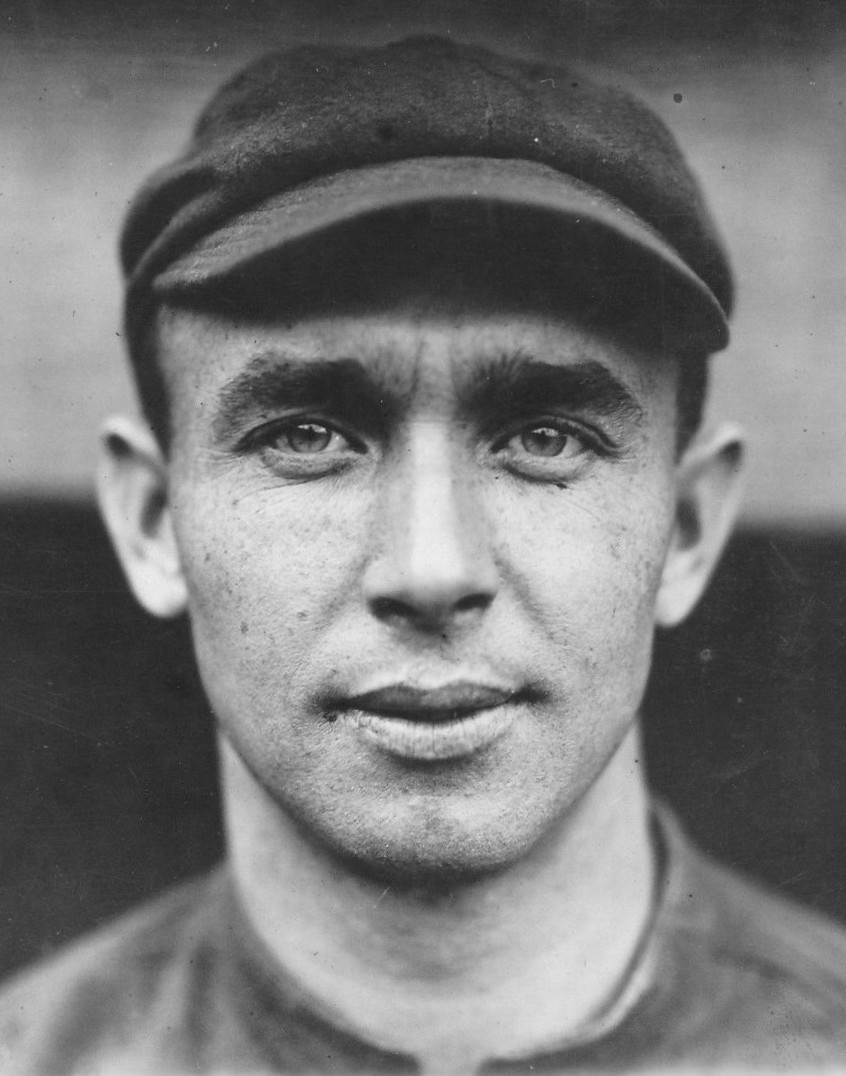
Dick Rudolph

Games 1 and 2: Shibe Park

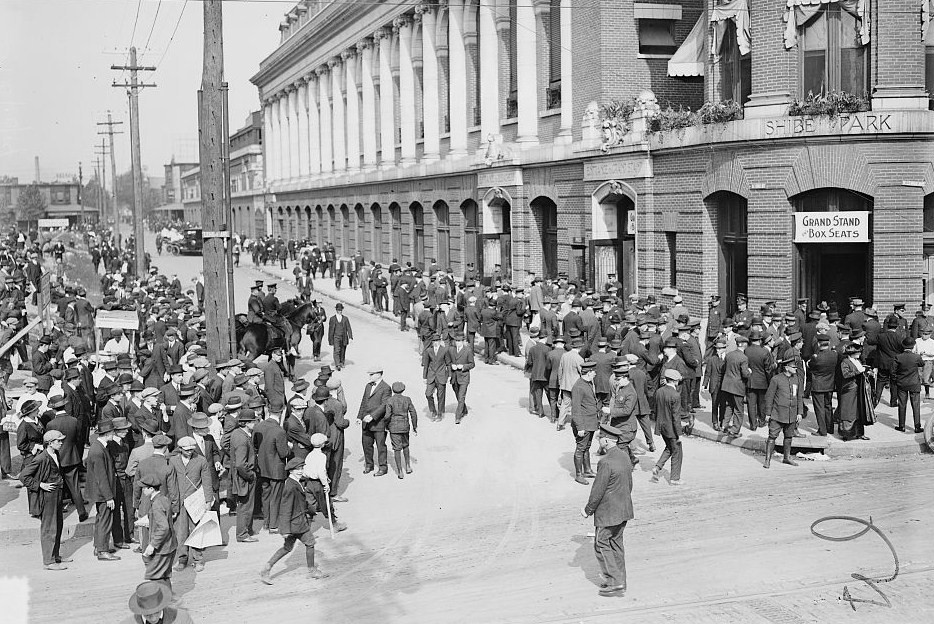
Hustle-bustle at the Shibe ticket window

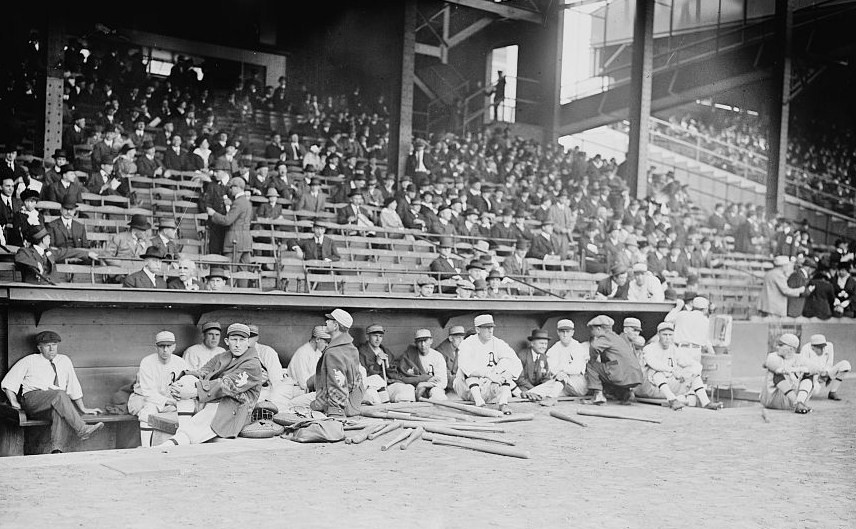
Glum A's await their fate in home dugout

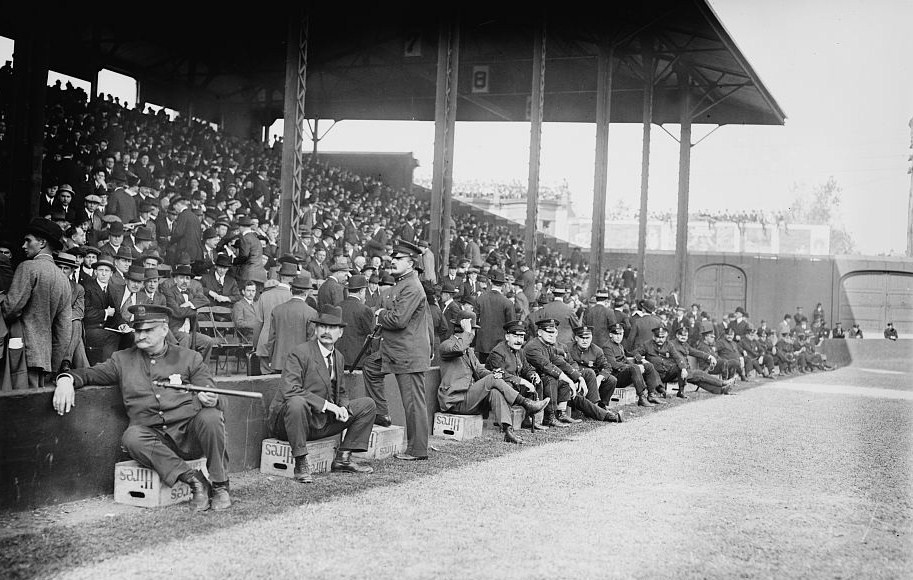
Philly's finest, all prepared to ensure order

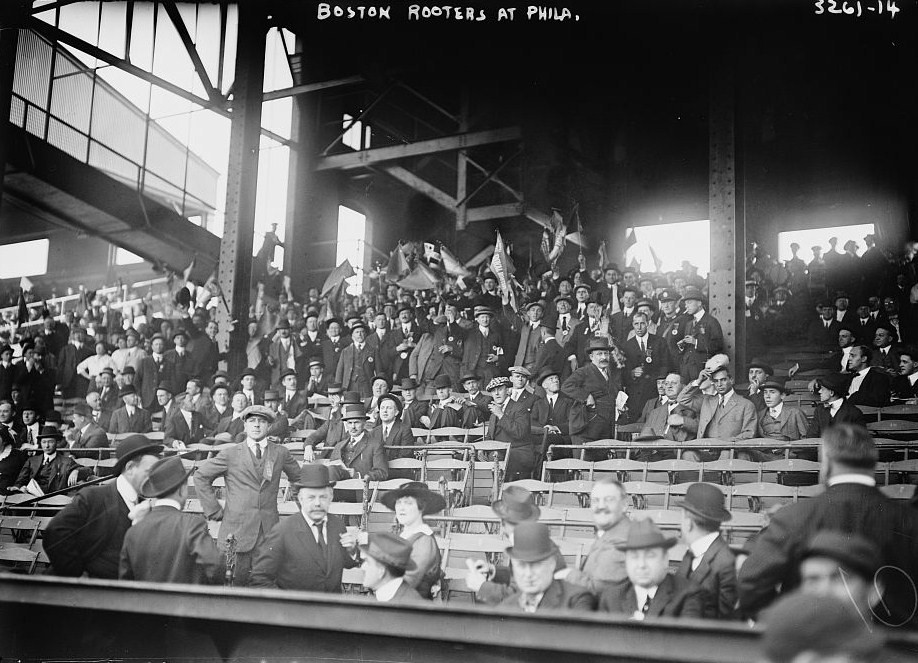
Boston fans in Philadelphia during Game 1

Games 3 and 4: Fenway Park

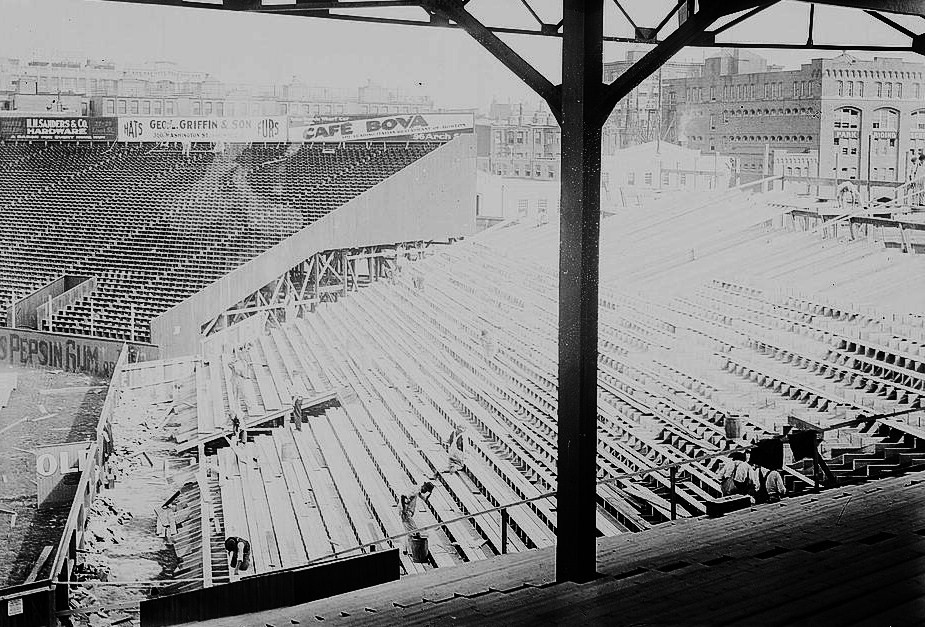
Work crews scurry to spiff up Fenway

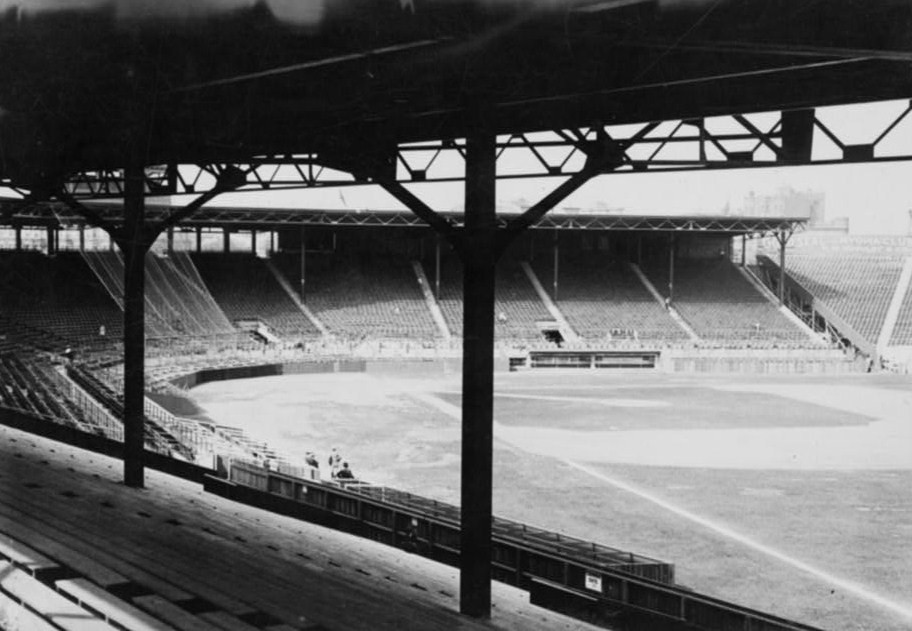
Fenway, not Braves Field, for Boston games

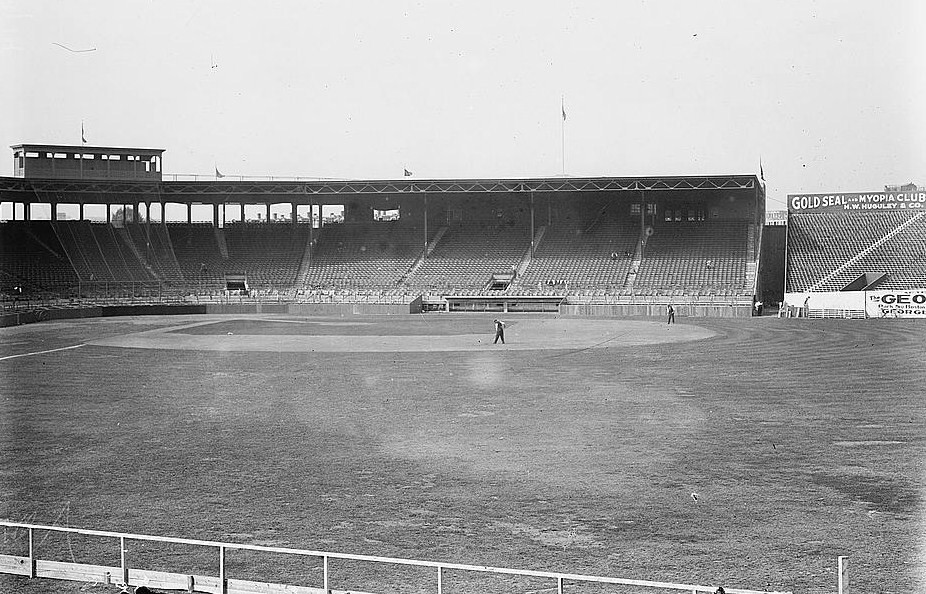
Grooming the field for the Braves' sweep

=== Game 1 ===
Friday, October 9, 1914 2:00 pm (ET) at Shibe Park in Philadelphia, Pennsylvania
Team	1	2	3	4	5	6	7	8	9	R	H	E
Boston	0	2	0	0	1	3	0	1	0	7	11	2
Philadelphia	0	1	0	0	0	0	0	0	0	1	5	0
WP: Dick Rudolph (1–0) LP: Chief Bender (0–1)

After having won 26 games, Dick Rudolph scattered five hits while striking out eight as the Braves won the opener in convincing fashion against the Athletics' ace, Chief Bender. Catcher Hank Gowdy had a single, double and triple as well as a walk in leading Boston's offensive attack. He was also on the back end of a double steal in the eighth inning, with Butch Schmidt's steal of home the Braves' final run.

In Tom Meany's 1950 book Baseball's Greatest Teams, with one chapter discussing what the author thought each of the then 16 major league teams' single most outstanding season was, the chapter on the Boston Braves was naturally on their one world championship year, 1914. Meany recalled that manager Stallings and the Braves showed utter contempt for Connie Mack's heavily favored A's by spurning the Shibe Park visiting clubhouse for the one in the National League Phillies' deserted home park, Baker Bowl (the NL site of the next World Series, which again featured Boston defeating Philadelphia, this time with the Red Sox beating the Phillies four games to one). Meany may also have been the source for the sensational sidelight that Stallings' motive for this may have been the rumor that the A's may have sabotaged the Shibe Park visiting clubhouse (with war clouds gathering in Europe as World War I was just beginning).

=== Game 2 ===
Saturday, October 10, 1914 2:00 pm (ET) at Shibe Park in Philadelphia, Pennsylvania
Team	1	2	3	4	5	6	7	8	9	R	H	E
Boston	0	0	0	0	0	0	0	0	1	1	7	1
Philadelphia	0	0	0	0	0	0	0	0	0	0	2	1
WP: Bill James (1–0) LP: Eddie Plank (0–1)

Bill James, Boston's other 26-game winner, hooked up against Philadelphia's Eddie Plank in a classic pitcher's duel. James allowed only three base runners in the first eight innings, picking off two of them in holding Philadelphia scoreless. Plank matched him until the ninth, when Amos Strunk lost Charlie Deal's fly ball in the sun for a double. Deal then stole third, and scored on a two-out single by Les Mann. James walked two batters in the ninth, but got Eddie Murphy to ground into a game-ending double play to give Boston a 2–0 advantage in the series coming back home to Fenway.

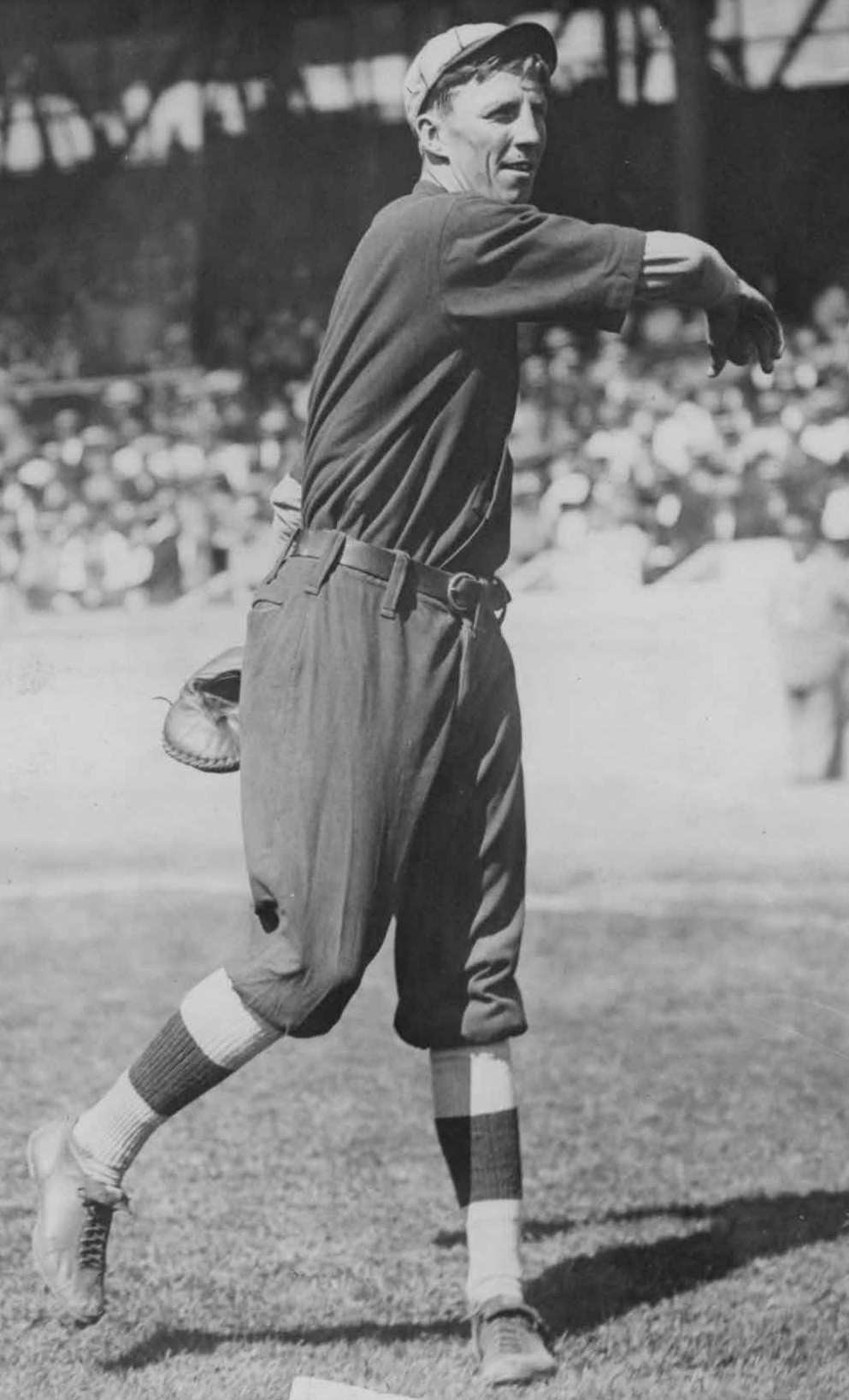
Hank Gowdy

=== Game 3 ===
Monday, October 12, 1914 2:00 pm (ET) at Fenway Park in Boston, Massachusetts
Team	1	2	3	4	5	6	7	8	9	10	11	12	R	H	E
Philadelphia	1	0	0	1	0	0	0	0	0	2	0	0	4	8	2
Boston	0	1	0	1	0	0	0	0	0	2	0	1	5	9	1
WP: Bill James (2–0) LP: Bullet Joe Bush (0–1); Home runs: PHA: None; BOS: Hank Gowdy (1)

Lefty Tyler of the Braves went up against Bullet Joe Bush in a 12-inning thriller. Frank "Home Run" Baker's two-out single in the tenth plated two runs to give the Athletics a 4–2 lead and a seeming victory to get them back in the series. But Hank Gowdy led off the bottom of the tenth with a home run, and the Braves then tied the game on Joe Connolly's sacrifice fly later in the inning. Game 2 winner Bill James, coming on in relief for Boston in the 11th, earned the win after Gowdy led off the bottom of the 12th with a double and pinch-runner Les Mann scored when Bush threw wildly to third on Herbie Moran's bunt, giving the Braves a commanding 3–0 series lead.

=== Game 4 ===
Tuesday, October 13, 1914 2:00 pm (ET) at Fenway Park in Boston, Massachusetts
Team	1	2	3	4	5	6	7	8	9	R	H	E
Philadelphia	0	0	0	0	1	0	0	0	0	1	7	0
Boston	0	0	0	1	2	0	0	0	X	3	6	0
WP: Dick Rudolph (2–0) LP: Bob Shawkey (0–1)

Johnny Evers' two-out, two-run single in the bottom of the fifth broke a 1–1 tie and the collective backs of the heavily favored Athletics as the "Miracle Braves" completed their improbable sweep. Game 1 winner Dick Rudolph allowed only one base-runner after Evers' tie-breaking hit and struck out seven in notching his second win of the series. The powerful A's were held to a .172 team batting average and no home runs in the series.

== Composite line score ==
1914 World Series (4–0): Boston Braves (N.L.) over Philadelphia Athletics (A.L.)

Team	1	2	3	4	5	6	7	8	9	10	11	12	R	H	E
Boston Braves	0	3	0	2	3	3	0	1	1	2	0	1	16	33	4
Philadelphia Athletics	1	1	0	1	1	0	0	0	0	2	0	0	6	22	3
Total attendance: 111,009 Average attendance: 27,752; Winning player's share: $2,812 Losing player's share: $2,032

== Aftermath ==
This was the only championship the Braves won during their time in Boston, as the team would move to Milwaukee, Wisconsin in 1953. They would make one more World Series appearance before the move in 1948, which they lost to the Cleveland Indians in six games. The Braves would win their next championship in 1957 over the New York Yankees in seven games, which would be the only championship they won in Milwaukee, as the team then moved to Atlanta in 1966.

The Athletics would return to the World Series in 1929, and defeated the Chicago Cubs in five games.

== See also ==
- List of World Series sweeps
