= 1993 in the United States =

- Decades: 1970s; 1980s; 1990s; 2000s; 2010s
- See also: History of the United States (1991–2016); Timeline of United States history (1990–2009); List of years in the United States

Events from the year 1993 in the United States.

== Incumbents ==
=== Federal government ===
- President:

George H. W. Bush (R-Texas) (until January 20)
Bill Clinton (D-Arkansas) (starting January 20)

- Vice President:

Dan Quayle (R-Indiana) (until January 20)
Al Gore (D-Tennessee) (starting January 20)

- Chief Justice: William Rehnquist (Virginia)
- Speaker of the House of Representatives: Tom Foley (D-Washington)
- Senate Majority Leader: George J. Mitchell
- Congress: 102nd (until January 3), 103rd (starting January 3)

==== State governments ====
Governors and lieutenant governors

=== Governors ===
- Governor of Alabama: H. Guy Hunt (Republican) (until April 22), Jim Folsom Jr. (Democratic) (starting April 22)
- Governor of Alaska: Wally Hickel (Alaskan Independence)/(Republican)
- Governor of Arizona: Fife Symington III (Republican)
- Governor of Arkansas: Jim Guy Tucker (Democratic)
- Governor of California: Pete Wilson (Republican)
- Governor of Colorado: Roy Romer (Democratic)
- Governor of Connecticut: Lowell P. Weicker Jr. (A Connecticut)
- Governor of Delaware: Dale E. Wolf (Republican) (until January 19), Thomas R. Carper (Democratic) (starting January 19)
- Governor of Florida: Lawton Chiles (Democratic)
- Governor of Georgia: Zell Miller (Democratic)
- Governor of Hawaii: John D. Waihee III (Democratic)
- Governor of Idaho: Cecil D. Andrus (Democratic)
- Governor of Illinois: Jim Edgar (Republican)
- Governor of Indiana: Evan Bayh (Democratic)
- Governor of Iowa: Terry E. Branstad (Republican)
- Governor of Kansas: Joan Finney (Democratic)
- Governor of Kentucky: Brereton Jones (Democratic)
- Governor of Louisiana: Edwin W. Edwards (Democratic)
- Governor of Maine: John R. McKernan Jr. (Republican)
- Governor of Maryland: William Donald Schaefer (Democratic)
- Governor of Massachusetts: William F. Weld (Republican)
- Governor of Michigan: John Engler (Republican)
- Governor of Minnesota: Arne H. Carlson (Republican)
- Governor of Mississippi: Kirk Fordice (Republican)
- Governor of Missouri: John Ashcroft (Republican) (until January 11), Mel Carnahan (Democratic) (starting January 11)
- Governor of Montana: Stan Stephens (Republican) (until January 4), Marc Racicot (Republican) (starting January 4)
- Governor of Nebraska: Ben Nelson (Democratic)
- Governor of Nevada: Bob Miller (Democratic)
- Governor of New Hampshire:
  - until January 2: Judd Gregg (Republican)
  - January 2–7: Ralph D. Hough (Democratic)
  - starting January 7: Steve Merrill (Republican)
- Governor of New Jersey: James Florio (Democratic)
- Governor of New Mexico: Bruce King (Democratic)
- Governor of New York: Mario Cuomo (Democratic)
- Governor of North Carolina: James G. Martin (Republican) (until January 9), Jim Hunt (Democratic) (starting January 9)
- Governor of North Dakota: Ed Schafer (Republican)
- Governor of Ohio: George Voinovich (Republican)
- Governor of Oklahoma: David Walters (Democratic)
- Governor of Oregon: Barbara Roberts (Democratic)
- Governor of Pennsylvania: Robert P. Casey (Democratic)
- Governor of Rhode Island: Bruce Sundlun (Democratic)
- Governor of South Carolina: Carroll A. Campbell Jr. (Republican)
- Governor of South Dakota: George S. Mickelson (Republican) (until April 19), Walter Dale Miller (Republican) (starting April 19)
- Governor of Tennessee: Ned McWherter (Democratic)
- Governor of Texas: Ann Richards (Democratic)
- Governor of Utah: Norman H. Bangerter (Republican) (until January 4), Mike Leavitt (Republican) (starting January 4)
- Governor of Vermont: Howard Dean (Democratic)
- Governor of Virginia: Douglas Wilder (Democratic)
- Governor of Washington: Booth Gardner (Democratic) (until January 13), Mike Lowry (Democratic) (starting January 13)
- Governor of West Virginia: Gaston Caperton (Democratic)
- Governor of Wisconsin: Tommy Thompson (Republican)
- Governor of Wyoming: Mike Sullivan (Democratic)

=== Lieutenant governors ===
- Lieutenant Governor of Alabama: Jim Folsom Jr. (Democratic) (until April 22), vacant (starting April 22)
- Lieutenant Governor of Alaska: Jack Coghill (Alaskan Independence)
- Lieutenant Governor of Arkansas: vacant (until November 20), Mike Huckabee (Republican) (starting November 20)
- Lieutenant Governor of California: Leo T. McCarthy (Democratic)
- Lieutenant Governor of Colorado: Mike Callihan (Democratic)
- Lieutenant Governor of Connecticut: Eunice Groark (A Connecticut)
- Lieutenant Governor of Delaware: vacant (until January 19), Ruth Ann Minner (Democratic) (starting January 19)
- Lieutenant Governor of Florida: Buddy MacKay (Democratic)
- Lieutenant Governor of Georgia: Pierre Howard (Democratic)
- Lieutenant Governor of Hawaii: Ben Cayetano (Democratic)
- Lieutenant Governor of Idaho: Butch Otter (Republican)
- Lieutenant Governor of Illinois: Bob Kustra (Republican)
- Lieutenant Governor of Indiana: Frank O'Bannon (Democratic)
- Lieutenant Governor of Iowa: Joy Corning (Republican)
- Lieutenant Governor of Kansas: Jim Francisco (Democratic)
- Lieutenant Governor of Kentucky: Paul E. Patton (Democratic)
- Lieutenant Governor of Louisiana: Melinda Schwegmann (Democratic)
- Lieutenant Governor of Maryland: Melvin A. Steinberg (Democratic)
- Lieutenant Governor of Massachusetts: Paul Cellucci (Republican)
- Lieutenant Governor of Michigan: Connie Binsfeld (Republican)
- Lieutenant Governor of Minnesota: Joanell Dyrstad (Democratic)
- Lieutenant Governor of Mississippi: Eddie Briggs (Republican)
- Lieutenant Governor of Missouri: Mel Carnahan (Democratic) (until January 11), Roger B. Wilson (Democratic) (starting January 11)
- Lieutenant Governor of Montana: Denny Rehberg (Republican)
- Lieutenant Governor of Nebraska: Maxine Moul (Democratic) (until October), Kim Robak (Democratic) (starting October)
- Lieutenant Governor of Nevada: Sue Wagner (Republican)
- Lieutenant Governor of New Mexico: Casey Luna (Democratic)
- Lieutenant Governor of New York: Stan Lundine (Democratic)
- Lieutenant Governor of North Carolina: James Carson Gardner (Republican) (until month and day unknown), Dennis A. Wicker (Democratic) (starting month and day unknown)
- Lieutenant Governor of North Dakota: Rosemarie Myrdal (Republican)
- Lieutenant Governor of Ohio: Mike DeWine (Republican)
- Lieutenant Governor of Oklahoma: Jack Mildren (Democratic)
- Lieutenant Governor of Pennsylvania: Mark Singel (Democratic)
- Lieutenant Governor of Rhode Island: Roger N. Begin (Democratic) (until January 2), Robert Weygand (Democratic) (starting January 2)
- Lieutenant Governor of South Carolina: Nick Theodore (Democratic)
- Lieutenant Governor of South Dakota: Walter Dale Miller (Republican) (until April 19), Steve T. Kirby (Republican) (starting April 19)
- Lieutenant Governor of Tennessee: John S. Wilder (Democratic)
- Lieutenant Governor of Texas: Bob Bullock (Democratic)
- Lieutenant Governor of Utah: W. Val Oveson (Republican) (until January 4), Olene S. Walker (Republican) (starting January 4)
- Lieutenant Governor of Vermont: vacant (until month and day unknown), Barbara W. Snelling (Republican) (starting month and day unknown)
- Lieutenant Governor of Virginia: Don Beyer (Democratic)
- Lieutenant Governor of Washington: Joel Pritchard (Republican)
- Lieutenant Governor of Wisconsin: Scott McCallum (Republican)

== Events ==
=== January ===
January 20: Bill Clinton becomes the 42nd U.S. president

January 20: Al Gore becomes the 45th U.S. vice president

- January 3 – In Moscow, George H. W. Bush and Boris Yeltsin sign the second Strategic Arms Reduction Treaty.
- January 5
  - The state of Washington executes Westley Allan Dodd by hanging (the first legal hanging in America since 1965).
  - $7,400,000 USD is stolen from Brinks Armored Car Depot in Rochester, New York in the fifth-largest robbery in U.S. history. Four men, Samuel Millar, Father Patrick Moloney, former Rochester Police officer Thomas O'Connor, and Charles McCormick, all of whom have ties to the Provisional Irish Republican Army, are accused.
- January 19
  - IBM announces a $4,970,000,000 loss for 1992, the largest single-year corporate loss in United States history to date.
  - Iraq disarmament crisis: Iraq refuses to allow UNSCOM inspectors to use its own aircraft to fly into Iraq, and begins military operations in the demilitarized zone between Iraq and Kuwait, and the northern Iraqi no-fly zones. U.S. forces fire approximately forty Tomahawk cruise missiles at Baghdad factories linked to Iraq's illegal nuclear weapons program. Iraq then informs UNSCOM that it will be able to resume its flights.
- January 20 – Bill Clinton is sworn in as the 42nd president of the United States, and Al Gore is sworn in as the 45th vice president.
- January 25 – Mir Aimal Kasi fires a rifle and kills two employees outside CIA headquarters in Langley, Virginia.
- January 31 – Super Bowl XXVII: The Buffalo Bills become the first team to lose three consecutive Super Bowls as they are defeated by the Dallas Cowboys, 52–17.

=== February ===
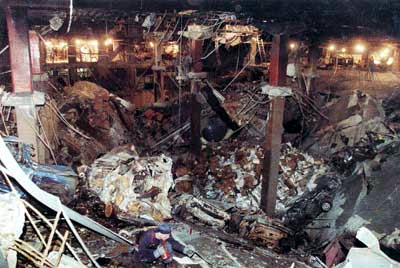
February 26: World Trade Center bombing

- February 6 – Former tennis player Arthur Ashe, 49, dies of complications due to HIV in New York. Ashe was believed to have contracted the virus from a blood transfusion during a heart surgery ten years earlier.
- February 8 – General Motors Corporation sues NBC, after Dateline NBC allegedly rigged two crashes showing that some GM pickups can easily catch fire if hit in certain places. NBC settles the lawsuit the following day.
- February 11 – Janet Reno is selected by President Clinton as Attorney General of the United States.
- February 17 – President Clinton delivers his first address to the 103rd Congress.
- February 26 – 1993 World Trade Center bombing: In New York City, a van bomb parked below the North Tower of the World Trade Center explodes, killing six and injuring over 1,000.
- February 28 – Bureau of Alcohol, Tobacco and Firearms agents raid the Branch Davidian compound in Waco, Texas, with a warrant to arrest leader David Koresh on federal firearms violations. Four agents and five Davidian followers die in the raid and a 51-day standoff begins.

=== March ===
- March 1–April 28 – An outbreak of Cryptosporidium protozoan affects Milwaukee, Wisconsin, infecting over 400,000 people, hospitalizing over 4,000, and killing at least 100, making it the largest waterborne disease outbreak in United States history.
- March 1 – The NFL introduces its current free agent system.
- March 4 – Authorities announce the capture of suspected World Trade Center bombing conspirator Mohammad Salameh.
- March 9 – Rodney King testifies at the federal trial of four Los Angeles, California police officers accused of violating his civil rights when they beat him during an arrest.
- March 11 – Janet Reno is confirmed by the United States Senate and sworn in the next day, becoming the first female Attorney General of the United States.
- March 13–14 – The Great Blizzard of 1993 strikes the eastern United States, bringing record snowfall and other severe weather all the way from Cuba to Quebec; the storm kills 318 people.
- March 22 – The Intel Corporation ships the first Pentium chips.
- March 29 – The 65th Academy Awards, hosted by Billy Crystal, are held at Dorothy Chandler Pavilion in Los Angeles, with Clint Eastwood's Unforgiven winning four awards, including Best Picture and Best Director. Both the film and James Ivory's Howards End lead the nominations with nine each. The telecast garners 45.7 million viewers.

=== April ===
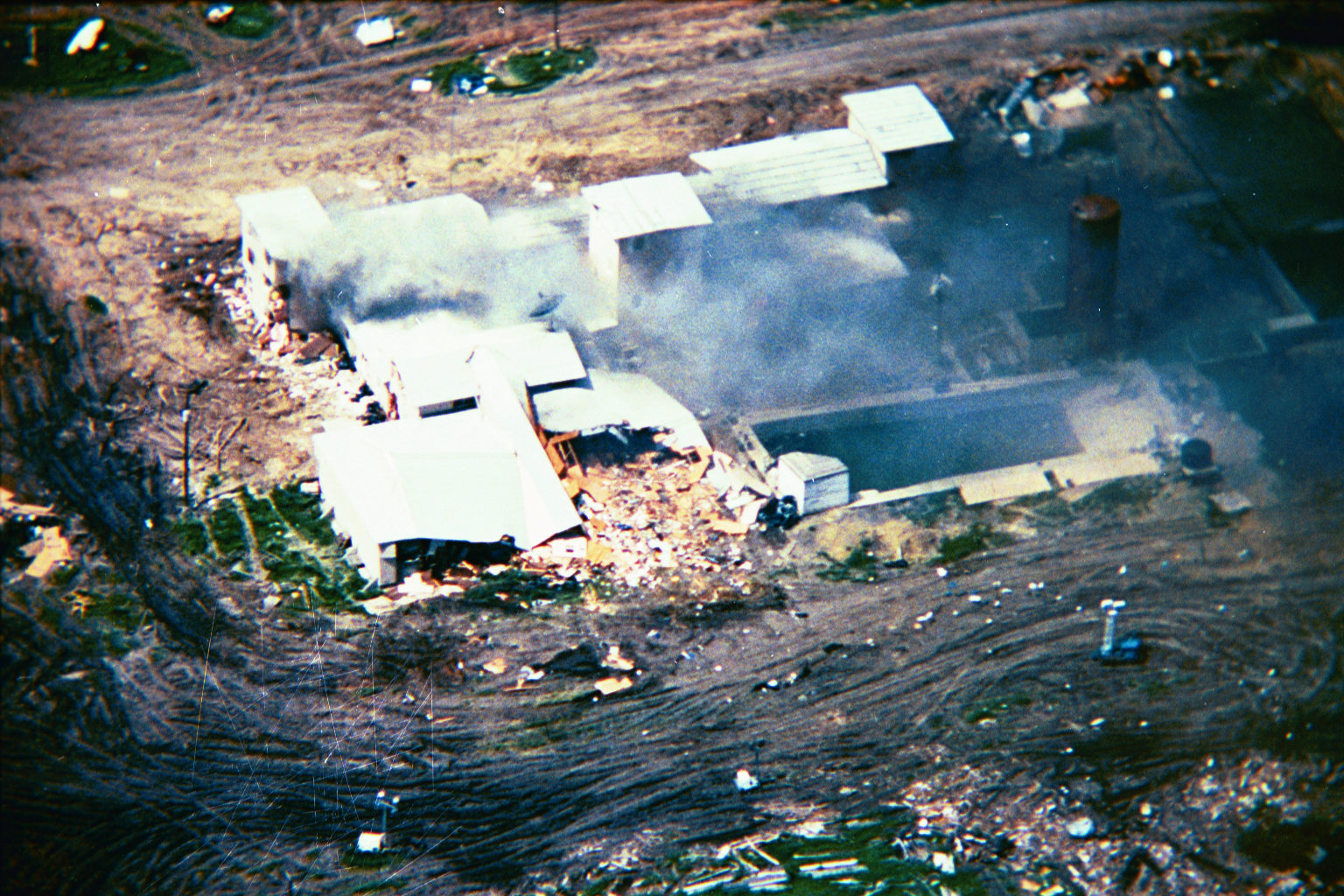
April 19: The Waco Siege ends with a deadly fire

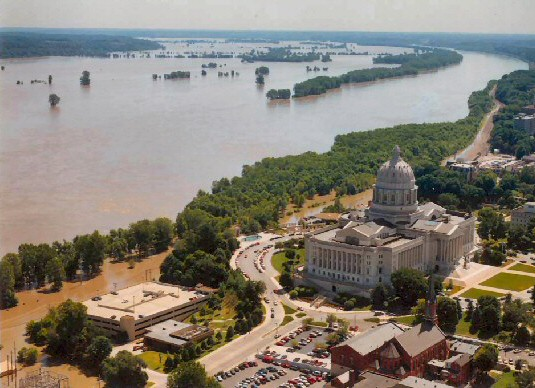
April – October: The Great Flood of 1993

- April–May – A virus strikes the Four Corners, killing at least 13 people.
- April–October – The Great Flood of 1993: The Mississippi and Missouri Rivers flood large portions of the American Midwest.
- April 4 – The World Wrestling Federation holds WrestleMania IX from Caesars Palace in Paradise, Nevada.
- April 9 – The rock band Nirvana plays a benefit concert for rape victims in war-torn Bosnia-Herzegovina at San Francisco's Cow Palace.
- April 13 – The Kuwaiti government claims to uncover an Iraqi assassination plot against former U.S. President George H. W. Bush shortly after his visit to Kuwait. Two Iraqi nationals confess to driving a car bomb into Kuwait on behalf of the Iraqi Intelligence Service.
- April 19 – A 51-day stand-off at the Branch Davidian compound near Waco, Texas, ends with a fire that kills 76 people, including David Koresh.
- April 28 – An executive order is issued requiring the United States Air Force to allow women to fly war planes.

=== May ===
- May 1 – An outbreak of a respiratory illness later identified as hantavirus pulmonary syndrome begins in the southwestern United States; 32 patients die by the end of the year.
- May 5 – The West Memphis Three are three men who – while teenagers – were tried and convicted, in 1994, of the May 5, 1993 murders of three boys in West Memphis, Arkansas. Damien Echols was sentenced to death, Jessie Misskelley Jr. was sentenced to life imprisonment plus two 20-year sentences, and Jason Baldwin was sentenced to life imprisonment. During the trial, the prosecution asserted that the children were killed as part of a Satanic ritual.
- May 20 – President Bill Clinton signs the National Voter Registration Act of 1993 into federal law.

=== June ===
- June 5 – Minnesota v. Dickerson: The United States Supreme Court rules that the seizure of evidence during a pat-down search is constitutional.
- June 9 – The Montreal Canadiens win their 24th Stanley Cup, defeating the Los Angeles Kings in the Finals.
- June 11 – Jurassic Park, directed by Steven Spielberg, is released in theaters as the first film in the Jurassic Park saga.
- June 20 – John Paxson's 3-point shot in Game 6 of the NBA Finals helps the Chicago Bulls secure a 99–98 win over the Phoenix Suns, and their third consecutive championship.
- June 24 – A Unabomber bomb injures computer scientist David Gelernter at Yale University.
- June 27 – U.S. President Bill Clinton orders a cruise missile attack on Iraqi intelligence headquarters in the Al-Mansur District of Baghdad, in response to the attempted assassination of former U.S. President George H. W. Bush during his visit to Kuwait in mid-April.

=== July ===
- July 1 – Gian Ferri kills eight and injures six before committing suicide at a law firm in San Francisco, sparking new legislative actions for gun control.
- July 15 – 1993 child sexual abuse accusations against Michael Jackson: Evan Chandler institutes legal accusations against singer Michael Jackson of sexually molesting Jordan Chandler, Evan's 13-year-old son.
- July 19 – U.S. President Bill Clinton announces his 'Don't ask, don't tell' policy regarding homosexuals serving in the American military.
- July 20 – White House deputy counsel Vince Foster dies by suicide in Virginia.
- July 25 – Greg Nicholson, his girlfriend and her two young daughters are murdered in Iowa by Dustin Honken and Angela Johnson. Nicholson was due to testify against Honken in court in relation to his drug activities.
- July 27 – Windows NT 3.1, the first version of Microsoft's line of Windows NT operating systems, is released to manufacturing.

=== August ===
- August 1 – The Great Flood of 1993 comes to a peak.
- August 4 – A federal judge sentences LAPD officers Stacey Koon and Laurence Powell to 30 months in prison for violating motorist Rodney King's civil rights.
- August 10
  - Ruth Bader Ginsburg is sworn in as an Associate Justice of the Supreme Court.
  - World Youth Day 1993 in Denver, Colorado.
- August 21 – NASA loses contact with the Mars Observer spacecraft.
- August 28 – Mighty Morphin Power Rangers, the first Power Rangers entry, debuts on Fox Kids.
- August 30 – The World Wrestling Federation holds its SummerSlam event from The Palace of Auburn Hills in Auburn Hills, Michigan.

=== September ===
- September 4 – The second World Parliament of Religions is held in Chicago.
- September 6 – Canadian software specialist Peter de Jager publishes an article titled "Doomsday 2000" in the U.S. weekly magazine Computerworld, which is the first known reference to Y2K – the Year 2000 problem.
- September 10 – Bill Nye the Science Guy first airs in syndication.
- September 13 – PLO leader Yasser Arafat and Israeli prime minister Yitzhak Rabin shake hands in Washington D.C., after signing a peace accord.
- September 13 – in TV
  - Animaniacs makes its debut on Fox Kids.
  - The Brazilian TV host Xuxa Meneghel debuts her English program on American TV, becoming the first Brazilian person to host a TV show in US.
- September 15–21 – Hurricane Gert crosses from the Atlantic to the Pacific Ocean through Central America and Mexico.
- September 18 – Rocko's Modern Life makes its debut on Nickelodeon, becoming the network's fourth "Nicktoon" in the line-up.
- September 22 – Big Bayou Canot rail accident: An Amtrak Sunset Limited derails on a bridge which had been damaged by a barge near Mobile, Alabama. It is the deadliest train wreck in Amtrak's history.

=== October ===
- October 3 – A large-scale battle erupts between U.S. forces and local militia in Mogadishu, Somalia; eighteen Americans and over 1,000 Somalis are killed.
- October 8 – David Miscavige announces the IRS has granted full tax exemption to the Church of Scientology International and affiliated churches and organizations, ending the Church's 40-year battle with the IRS and resulting in religious recognition in the United States.
- October 16 – U.S. President Bill Clinton sends six American warships to Haiti to enforce United Nations trade sanctions against their military-led regime.
- October 25 – Actor Vincent Price dies of lung cancer.
- October 27 – Wildfires begin in California, which eventually destroy over 16,000 acres (65 km^{2}) and 700 homes.
- October 31 – Actor River Phoenix dies of drug-induced heart failure on the sidewalk outside the West Hollywood nightclub The Viper Room.

=== November ===
- November 11 – Microsoft releases Windows 3.11 for Workgroups to manufacturing.
- November 16 – President Bill Clinton signs the Religious Freedom Restoration Act of 1993 into federal law.
- November 18 – In a status referendum, Puerto Rico residents vote with a slim margin to maintain Commonwealth status.
- November 17–22 – The North American Free Trade Agreement (NAFTA) passes the legislative houses in the United States, Canada and Mexico.
- November 18 – The first meeting of the Asia-Pacific Economic Cooperation opens in Seattle.
- November 20 – Savings and loan crisis: The United States Senate Ethics Committee issues a stern censure of California senator Alan Cranston for his dealings with savings-and-loan executive Charles Keating.
- November 22 – TV Food Network makes its debut.
- November 30 – President Clinton signs the Brady Handgun Violence Prevention Act into law, requiring purchasers of handguns to pass a background check.

=== December ===
- December
  - The unemployment rate falls to 6.5%, the lowest since January 1991.
  - ProCharger, an automotive aftermarket manufacturer is founded in Kansas.
- December 2 – STS-61: NASA launches the Space Shuttle Endeavour on a mission to repair an optical flaw in the Hubble Space Telescope.
- December 7
  - Colin Ferguson opens fire with his Ruger 9 mm pistol on a Long Island Rail Road train, killing six and injuring 29.
  - Avi Arad founds Marvel Studios.
- December 11 – A variety of Soviet space program paraphernalia are put to auction in Sotheby's New York, and sell for a total of US$6,800,000. One of the items is Lunokhod 1 and its spacecraft Luna 17; they sell for $68,500.
- December 14: A Deadly shooting takes place at a Chuck E. Cheese, killing 4 people.

=== Ongoing ===
- Iraqi no-fly zones (1991–2003)

== Sport ==
- February 23 - Sacramento Gold Miners are established as the First American franchise in the Canadian Football League
- The Colorado Rockies and the Miami Marlins become baseball teams.

== Births ==
=== January ===
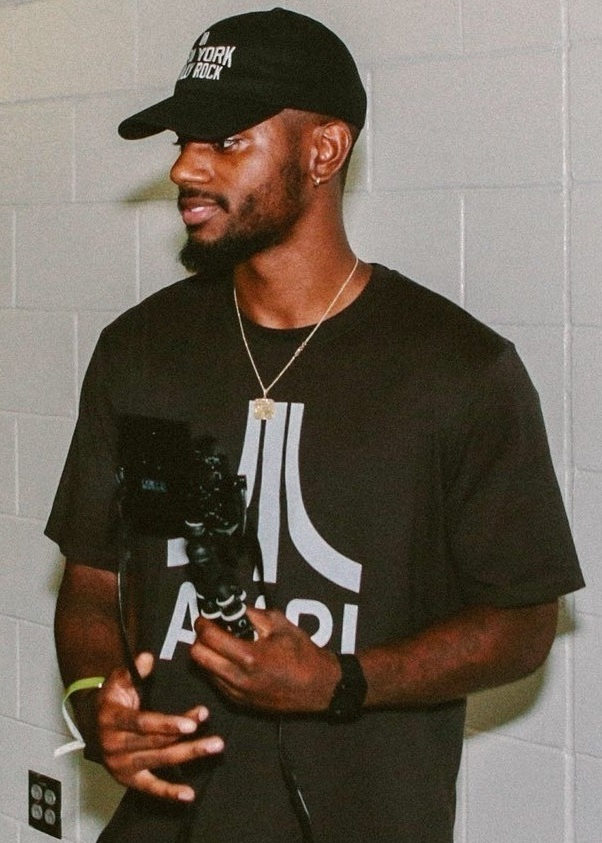
Bryson Tiller

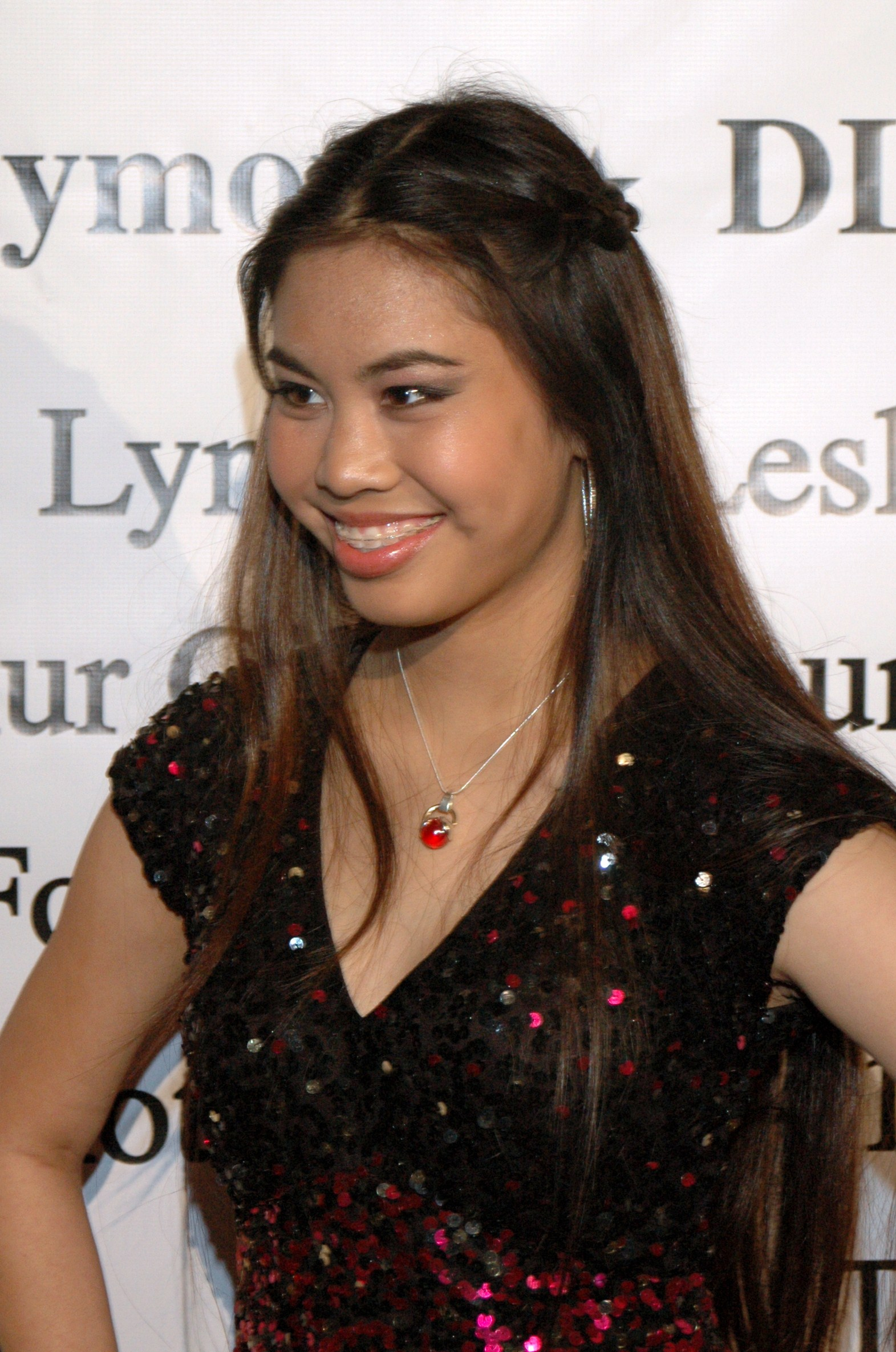
Ashley Argota

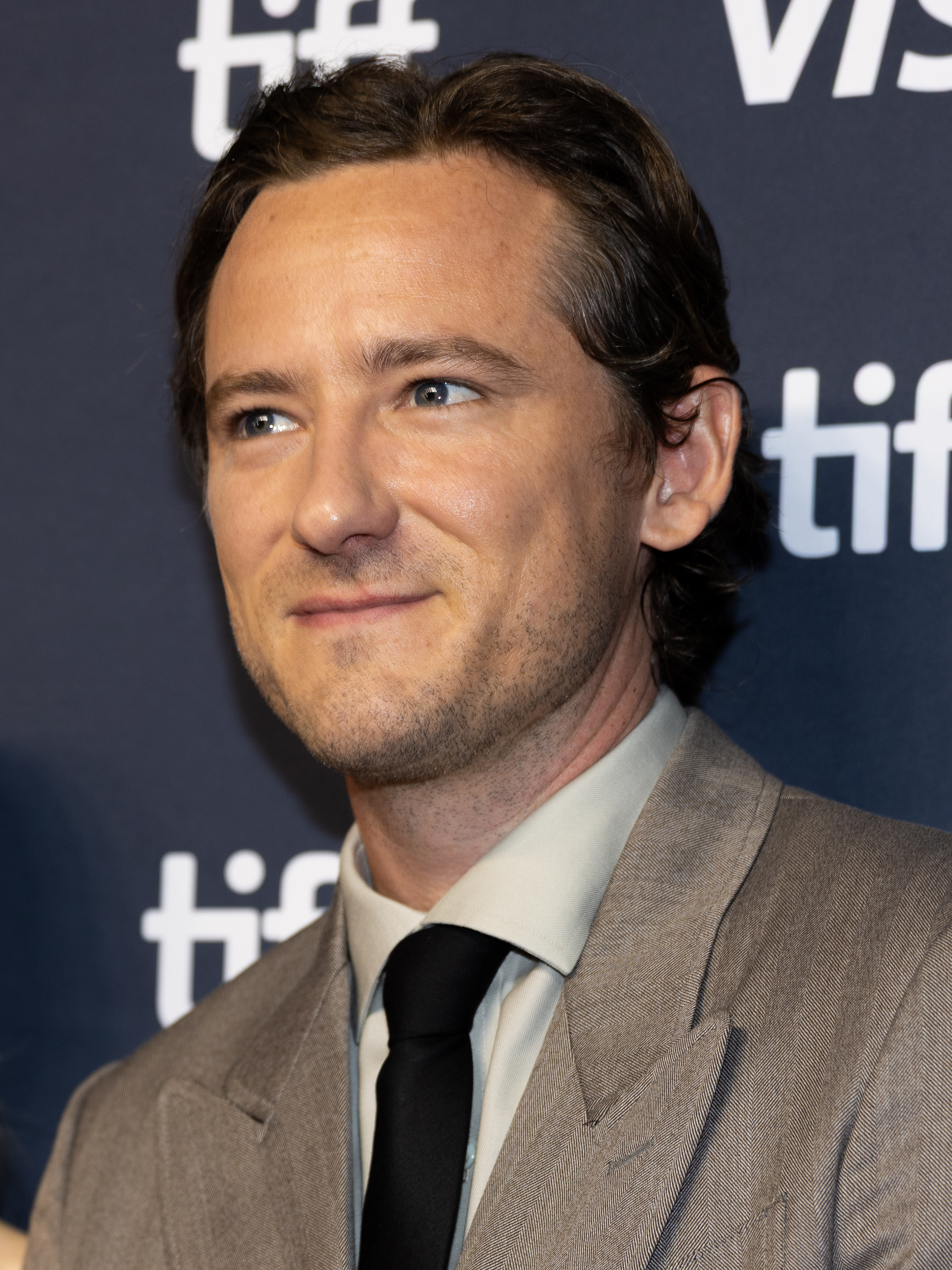
Lewis Pullman

- January 2 – Bryson Tiller, musician
- January 3
  - Vernon Adams, football player
  - Kevin Ware, basketball player
- January 5 – De'Anthony Thomas, football player
- January 7 – Darby Allin, wrestler
- January 8 – Brooke Greenberg, woman with rare slow-aging condition (d. 2013)
- January 9
  - Ashley Argota, actress
  - Marcus Peters, football player
- January 11 – Flora Cross, French-born actress
- January 12 – Jamel Artis, basketball player
- January 13
  - Kendall Anthony, basketball player
  - Tyler Barnhardt, actor
- January 14
  - Chris Avila, martial artist
  - Molly Tuttle, musician
- January 15
  - Kadeem Allen, basketball player
  - Wil Trapp, soccer player
- January 17 – Jeremiah Attaochu, Nigerian-born football player
- January 18
  - Mitra Jouhari, actress, comedian, and writer
  - Morgan York, actress
- January 19
  - Zyon Cavalera, drummer
  - Gus Lewis, actor
  - Jack Schlossberg, writer and political candidate, grandson of John F. Kennedy and Jackie Kennedy
- January 20 – Cat Janice, singer (d. 2024)
- January 26 – Lizzie Armanto, American-born Finnish skateboarder
- January 27 – Joe Landolina, inventor and entrepreneur
- January 29 – Lewis Pullman, actor
- January 30 – Stephen Anderson, football player
- January 31 – Alex Bent, drummer for Trivium

=== February ===
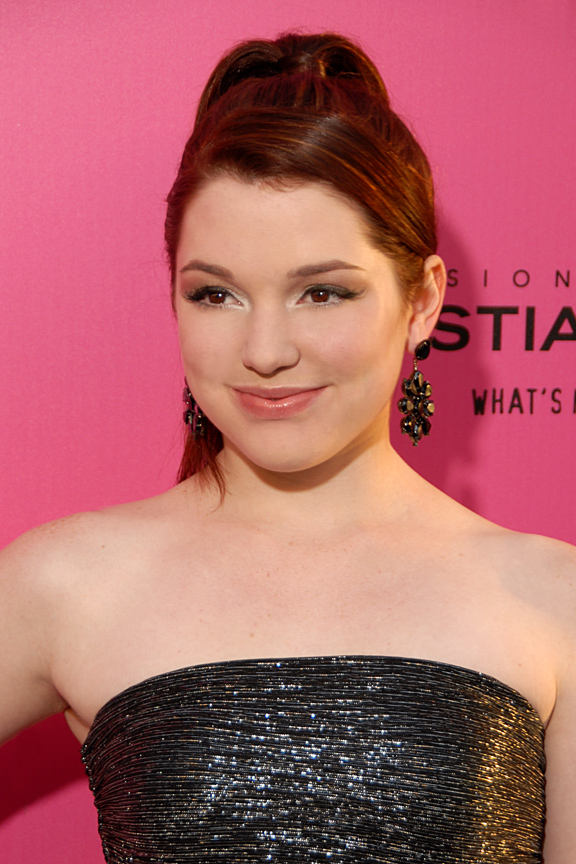
Jennifer Stone

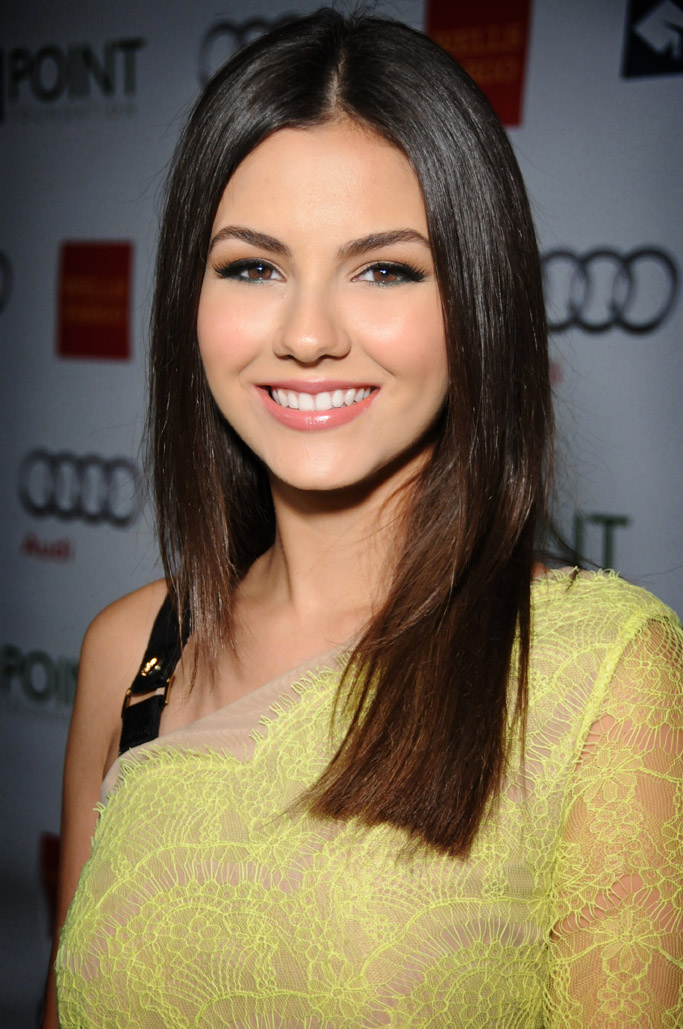
Victoria Justice

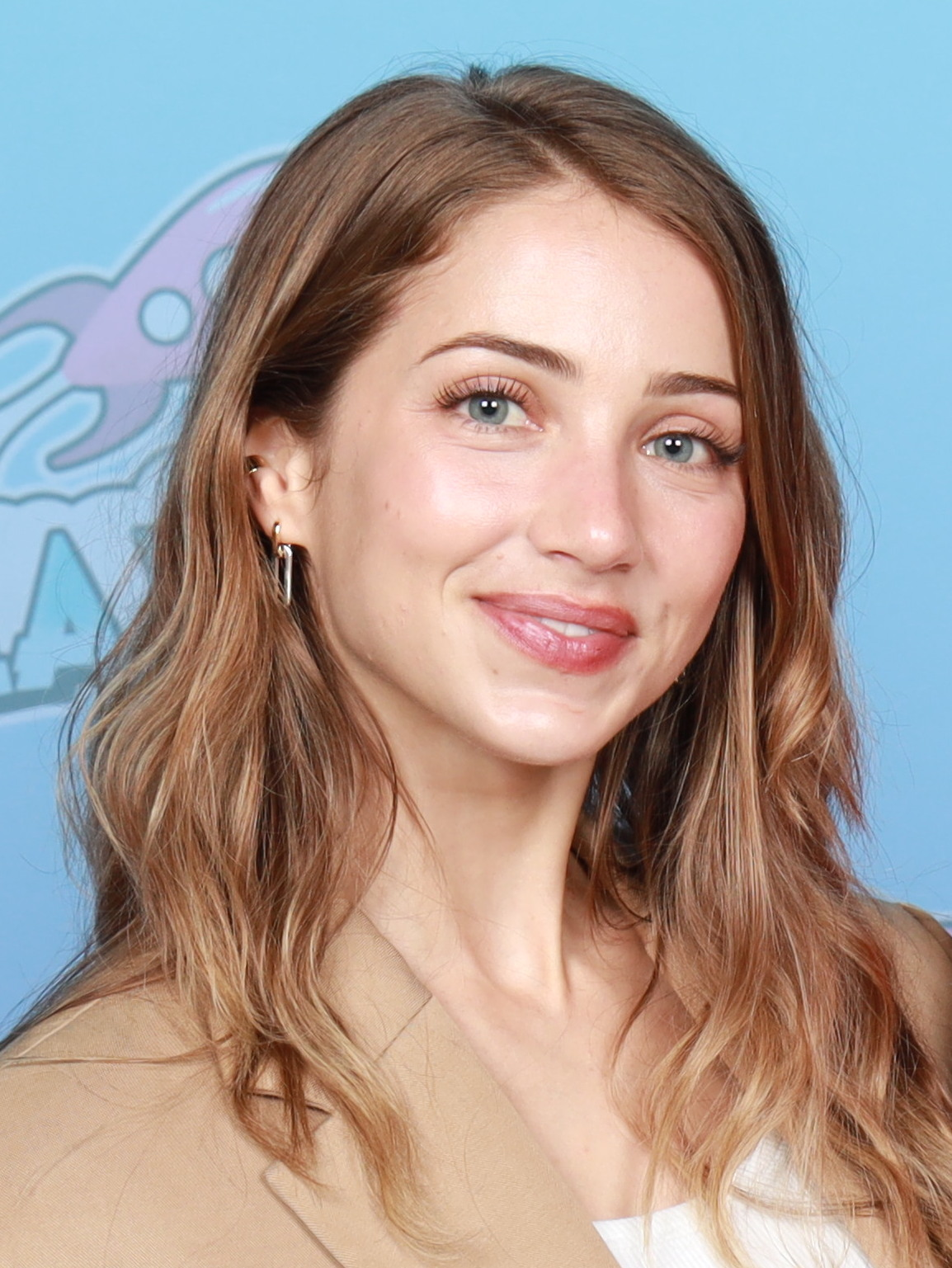
Emily Rudd

- February 2 – Karsta Lowe, volleyball player
- February 3 – Brandon Micheal Hall, actor
- February 6 – Tinashe, musician and actress
- February 7 – David Dorfman, actor
- February 9 – Nura Afia, beauty vlogger
- February 10 – Lexi Atkins, actress, model, and beauty pageant titleholder
- February 12
  - Taylor Dearden, actress
  - Sam Kazemian, software programmer and co-founder of Everipedia
  - Jennifer Stone, actress
- February 13
  - Gemma Acheampong, American-born Ghanaian Olympic sprinter
  - Taylor Alxndr, drag performer
- February 14
  - Shane Harper, actor and singer
  - Alberto Rosende, actor
- February 15 – Alex ter Avest, actress
- February 17 – Jason Anderson, motorcyclist
- February 18
  - Kentavious Caldwell-Pope, basketball player
  - Unbridled's Song, thoroughbred horse, winner of Breeders' Cup Juvenile (1995) (d. 2013)
- February 19
  - Patrick Johnson, actor
  - Victoria Justice, actress and singer
- February 23 – Andrea Kneppers, American-Dutch swimmer
- February 24 – Emily Rudd, actress
- February 25 – Timmy Hill, race car driver
- February 27
  - Kyle Daukaus, mixed martial artist
  - Jessica Korda, golfer

=== March ===
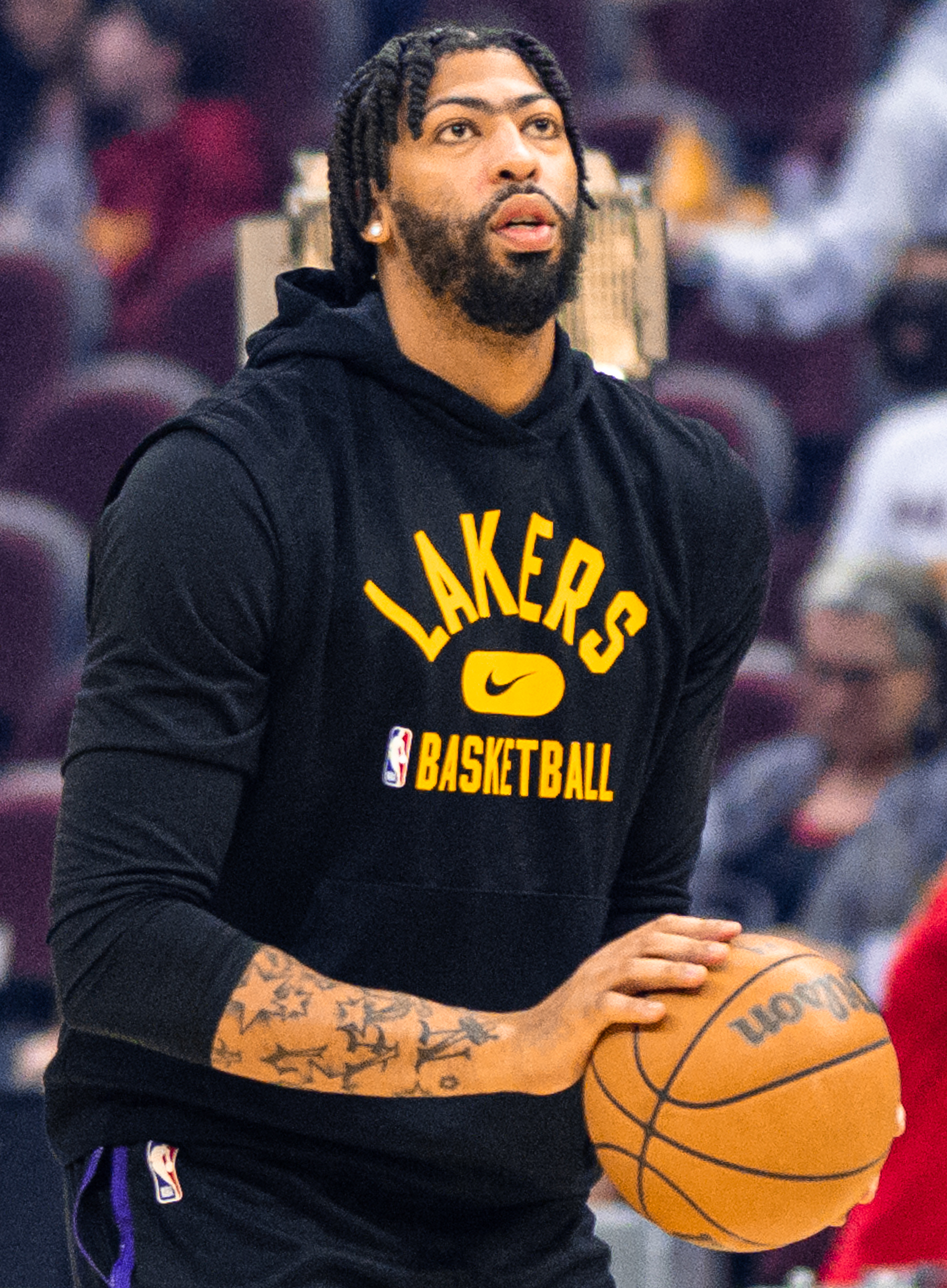
Anthony Davis

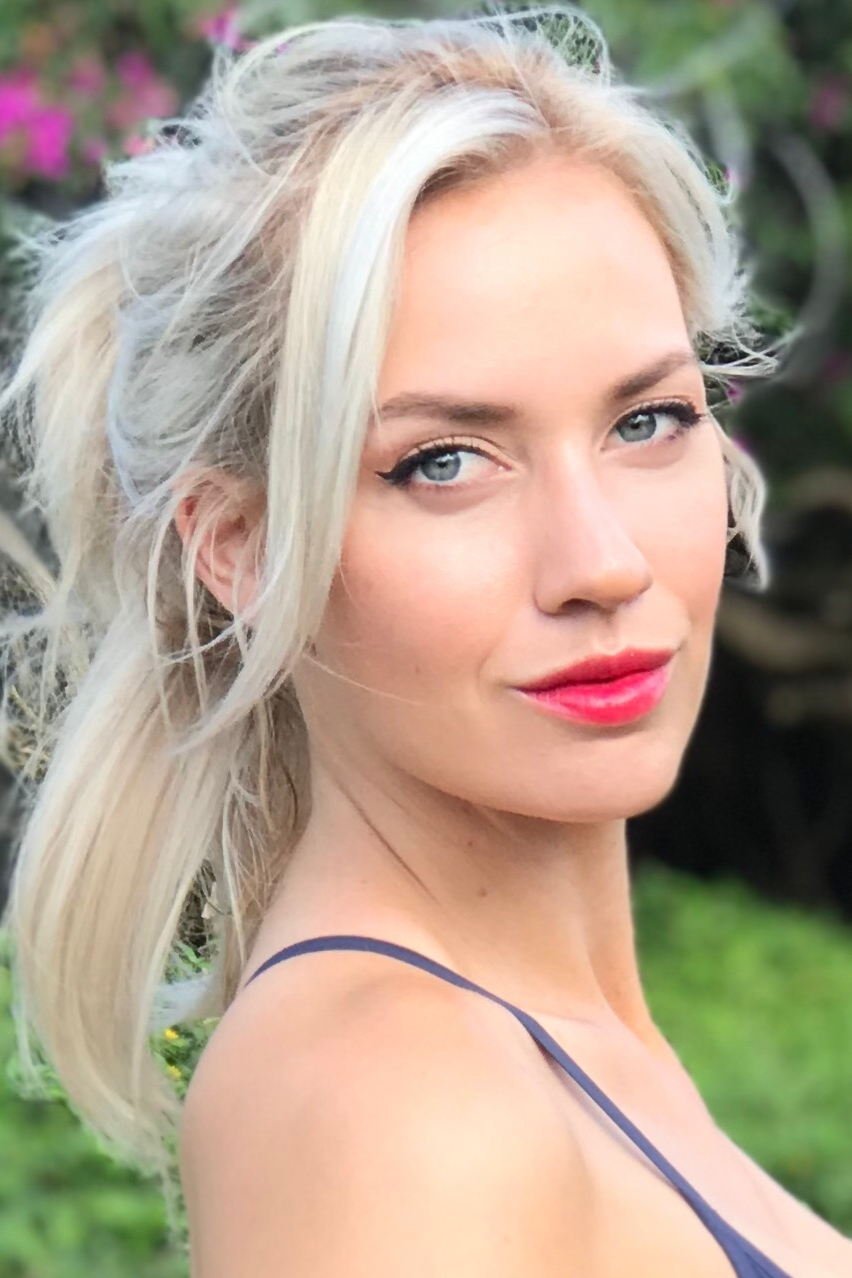
Paige Spiranac

- March 1
  - Jason Alexander, baseball player
- March 3 – Nicole Gibbs, tennis player
- March 4
  - Jenna Boyd, actress
  - Bobbi Kristina Brown, reality TV personality (d. 2015)
  - Abigail Mavity, actress
- March 5 – Josh Briggs, pro wrestler
- March 7 – Alex Broadhurst, ice hockey player
- March 10 – Peniel Shin, rapper and dancer for BtoB
- March 11 – Anthony Davis, basketball player
- March 14 – J. T. Miller, ice hockey player
- March 15 – Greg Allen, baseball player
- March 16
  - Tobi Antigha, football player
  - Emily Fischnaller, Olympic luger
- March 18
  - Alan Aisenberg, actor and producer
  - Solo Sikoa, pro wrestler
- March 25 – Jarrod Alonge, comedian, songwriter, and music producer
- March 26 – Paige Spiranac, golfer and model
- March 29 – Joe Adler, actor

=== April ===
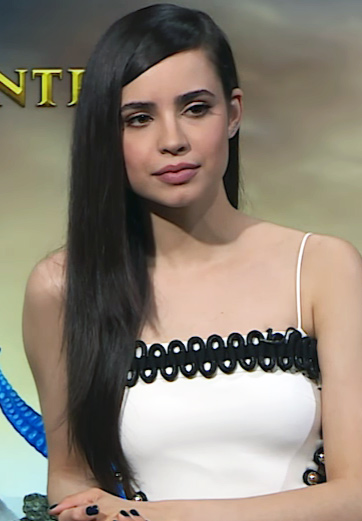
Sofia Carson

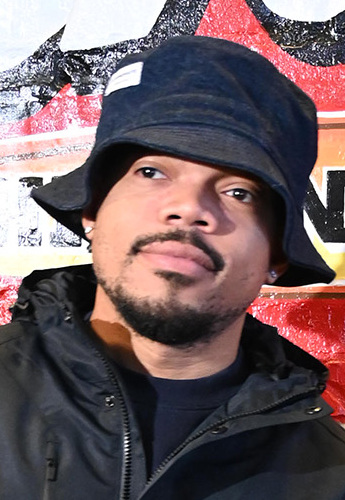
Chance the Rapper

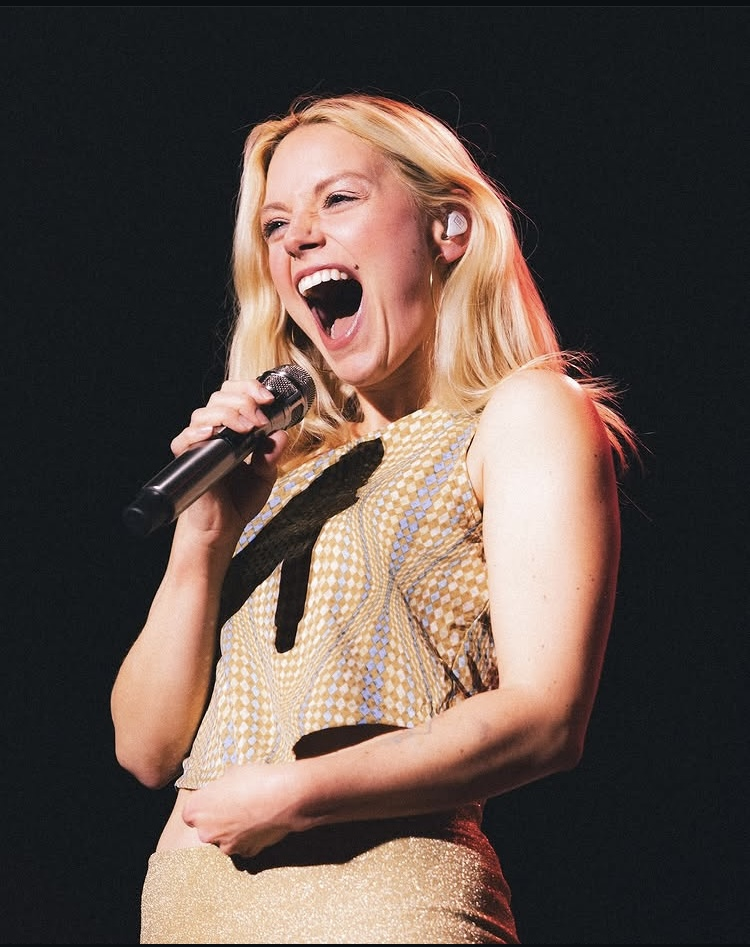
Ashe

- April 2
  - Ace, gamer
  - Aaron Kelly, singer
- April 4 – Miguel Almonte, Dominican-born baseball player
- April 6 – Brian Burkheiser, singer/songwriter and frontman for I Prevail (2013–2025)
- April 10
  - DJ A-Tron, DJ and radio host
  - Sofia Carson, actress and singer
- April 12
  - Robin Anderson, tennis player
  - Dorial Green-Beckham, football player
  - Katelyn Pippy, actress
- April 13 – Hannah Marks, actress
- April 14
  - Vivien Cardone, actress
  - Kent Jones, rapper
  - Graham Phillips, actor
  - Ellington Ratliff, singer and actor
  - Burnell Taylor, singer
- April 15
  - Eric Anderson, basketball player
  - Madeleine Martin, television and voice actress
- April 16
  - Mirai Nagasu, figure skater
  - Chance the Rapper, singer/songwriter
- April 19 – Kaylea Arnett, diver
- April 24 – Ashe, singer/songwriter
- April 25 – Alex Bowman, race car driver
- April 29
  - Adrian Amos, football player
  - Justin Thomas, golfer

=== May ===
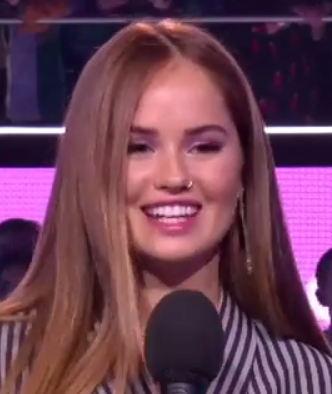
Debby Ryan

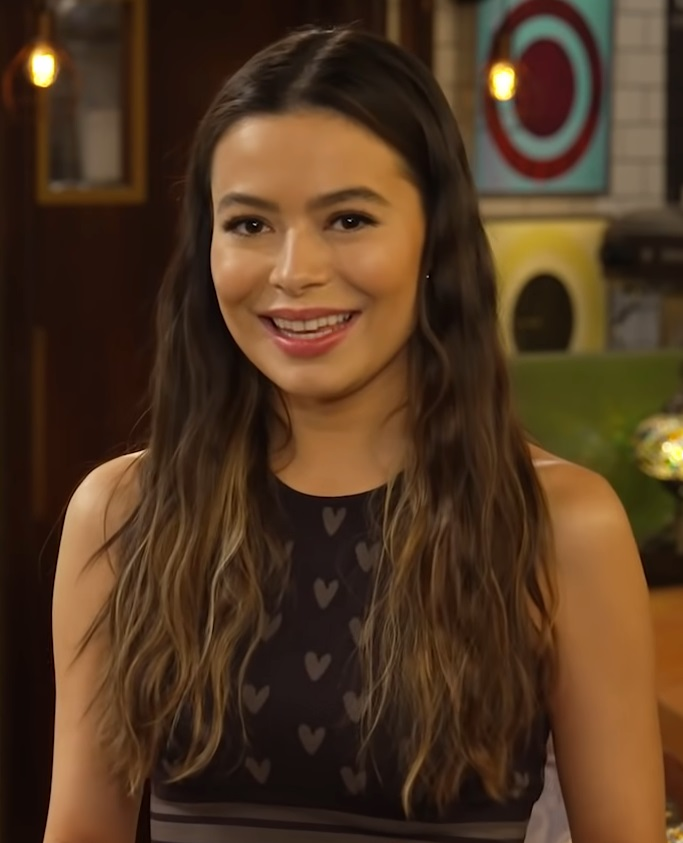
Miranda Cosgrove

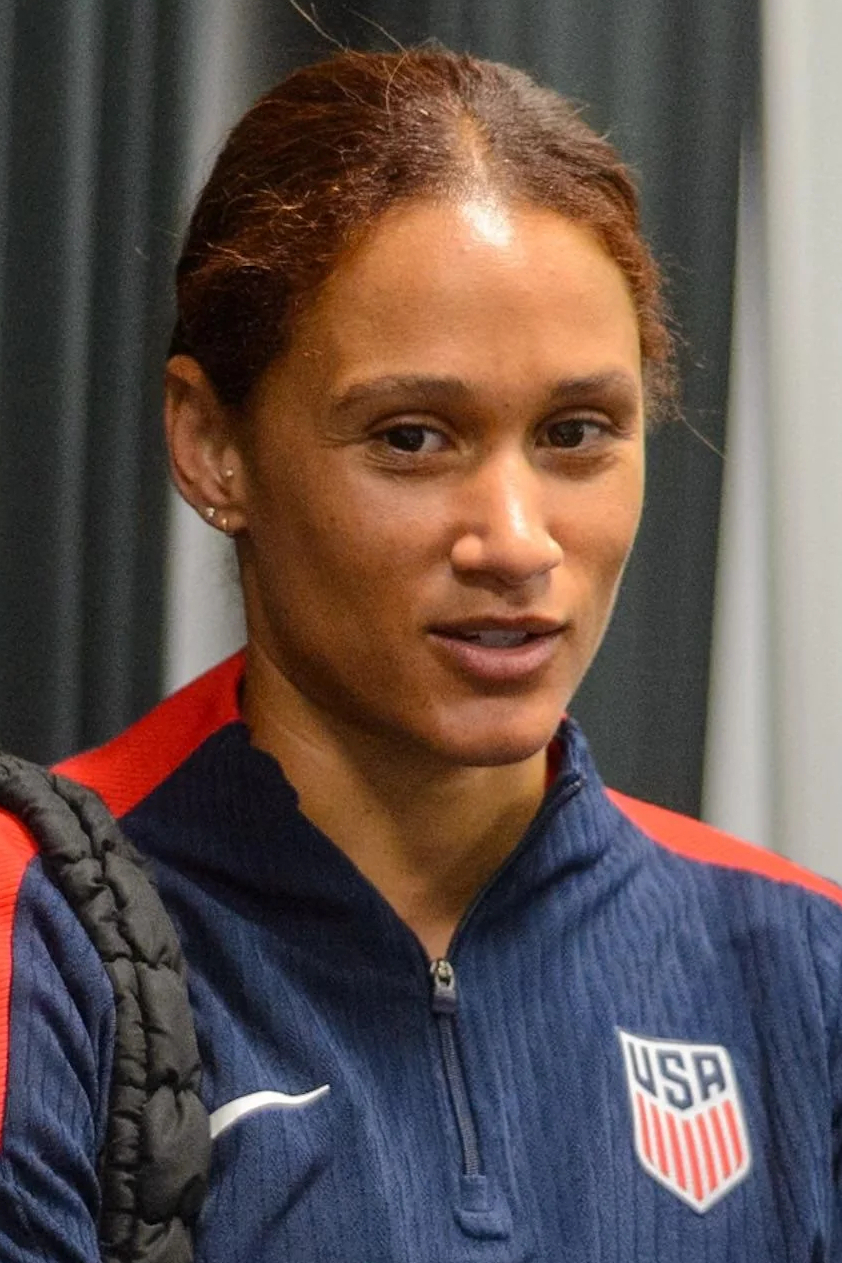
Lynn Biyendolo

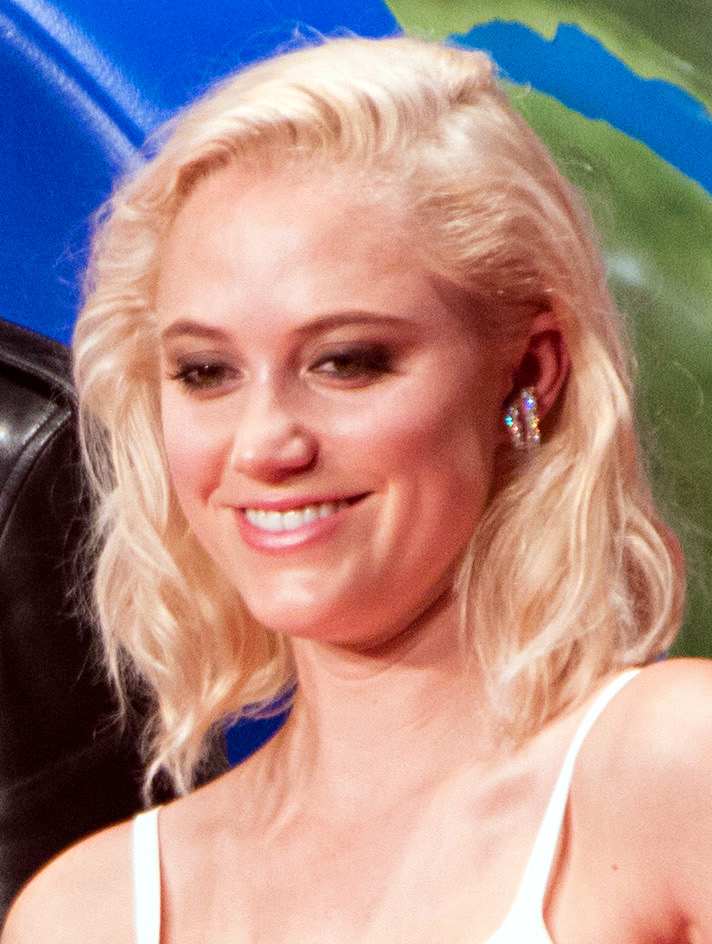
Maika Monroe

- May 2 – Jarred Brooks, mixed martial artist and current ONE Strawweright World Champion
- May 6
  - Rana Abdelhamid, activist and political candidate
  - Alex Preston, singer
- May 10
  - Spencer Fox, actor, musician, and singer
  - Halston Sage, actress
- May 11 – Annabelle Attanasio, actress and filmmaker
- May 13 – Debby Ryan, actress and singer
- May 14 – Miranda Cosgrove, actress and singer
- May 16 – Raheem Appleby, basketball player
- May 18 – Kyle, rapper
- May 19
  - Brian Anderson, baseball player
  - Connor Hellebuyck, ice hockey player
  - Daisy Mallory, country singer
- May 20 – Caroline Zhang, figure skater
- May 21
  - Aron, American-born South Korean singer
  - Lynn Biyendolo, soccer player
  - Laura Loomer, political advisor and activist
- May 23
  - Andy Janovich, football player
  - Stephon Tuitt, football player
- May 24 – Nelson Agholor, Nigerian-born football player
- May 25
  - Andrew Andrews, basketball player
  - Kalief Browder, prisoner who endured solitary confinement (d. 2015)
- May 26
  - Clinton Anderson, politician
  - Jimmy Vesey, ice hockey player
- May 27 – Tanner Anderson, baseball player
- May 29 – Maika Monroe, actress
- May 30 – Keanu Asing, surfer

=== June ===
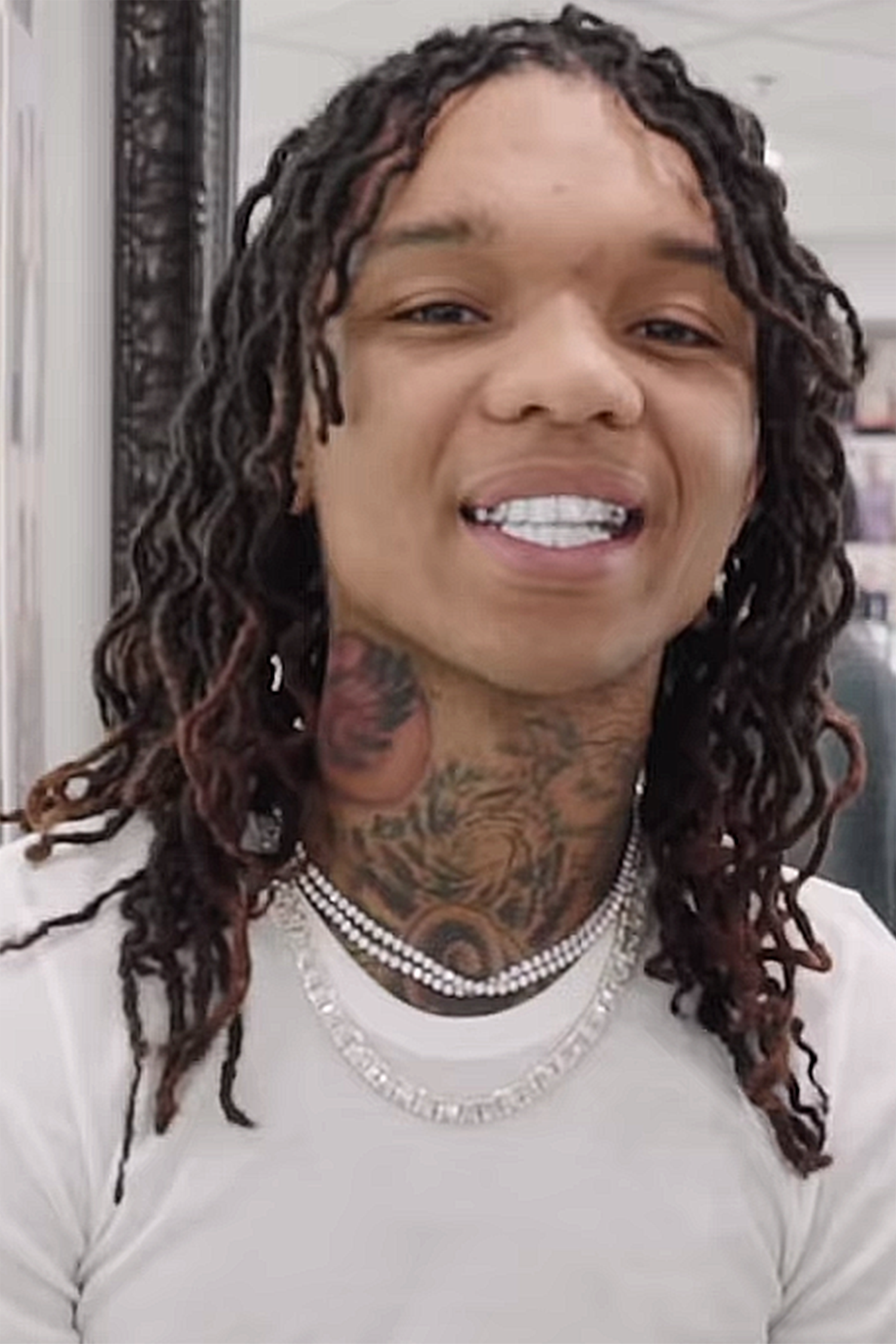
Swae Lee

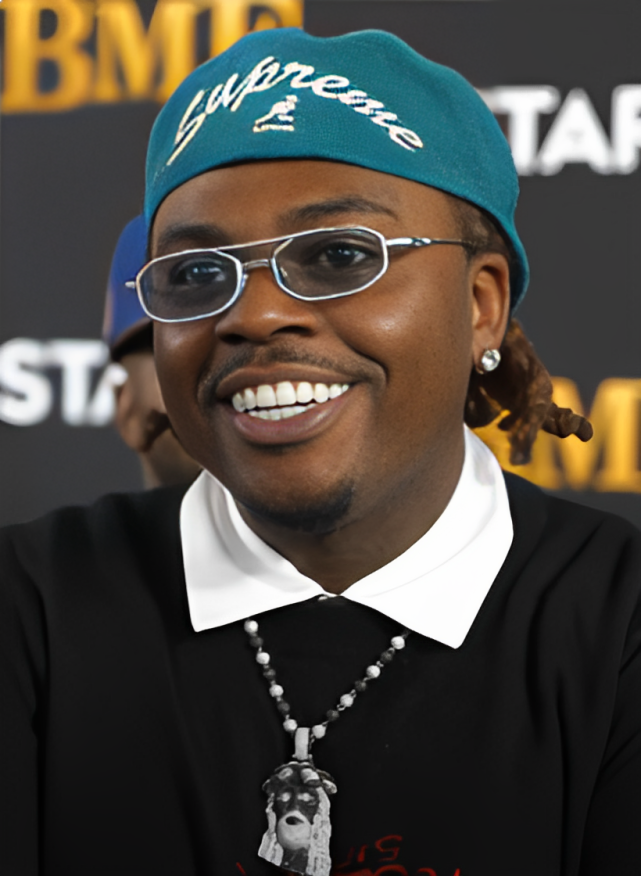
Gunna

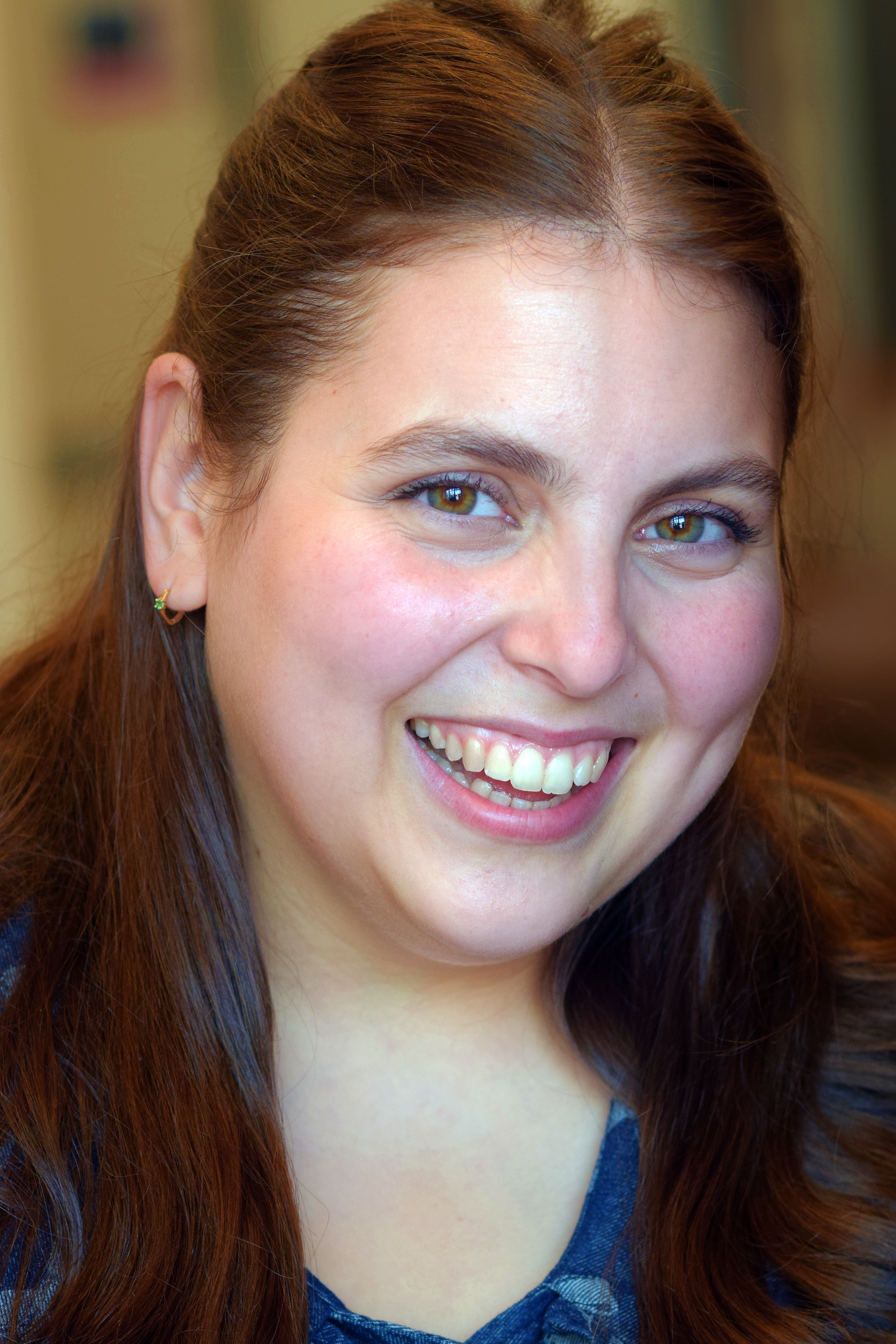
Beanie Feldstein

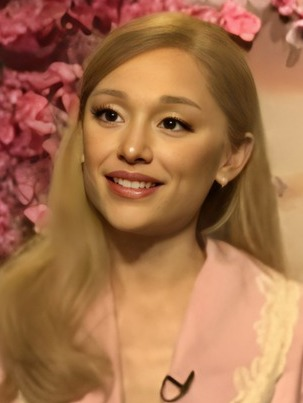
Ariana Grande

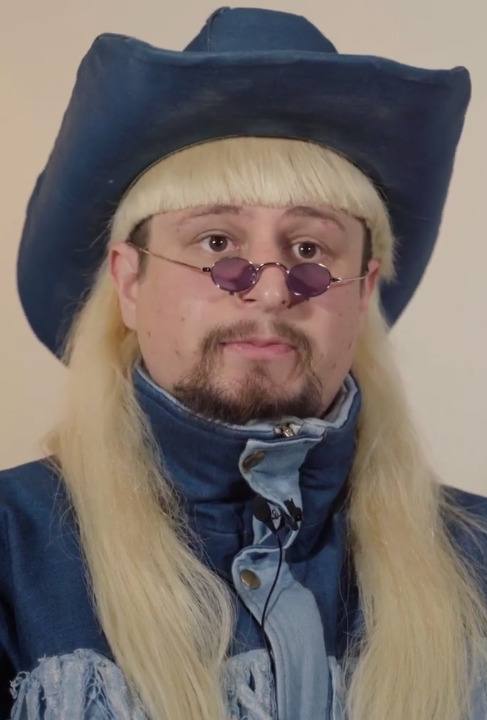
Oliver Tree

- June 1 – Sam Anas, ice hockey player
- June 2 – Abena Appiah, Ghanaian-born singer, model, and beauty pageant winner
- June 3 – Sabrina Gonzalez Pasterski, American theoretical physicist
- June 4
  - Austin Appleby, football player and coach
  - Adam Saleh, YouTuber
- June 5
  - DeVaughn Akoon-Purcell, basketball player
  - Tyre Nichols, victim of police brutality (d. 2023)
- June 6 – Vic Mensa, rapper
- June 7
  - AJ Andrews, softball player
  - Swae Lee, singer, rapper, and songwriter
  - Amanda Leighton, actress
- June 9 – Ash Santos, actress
- June 11
  - Jorge Alfaro, Colombian-born baseball player
  - Jessica Ayers, soccer player
- June 13 – Ameer Abdullah, football player
- June 14
  - Gunna, rapper
  - Ryan McCartan, actor and singer
  - Sammy Watkins, football player
- June 15 – Jay Ajayi, British-born football player
- June 21 – Hungrybox, esports athlete
- June 22
  - Caydee Denney, pair skater
  - Izzy Miller, musician
- June 23 – Tim Anderson, baseball player
- June 24 – Beanie Feldstein, actress
- June 25 – Dylan Walczyk, Olympic freestyle skier
- June 26 – Ariana Grande, actress and singer
- June 29
  - Lorenzo James Henrie, actor
  - Oliver Tree, singer, record producer, director and comedian (d. 2026)

=== July ===
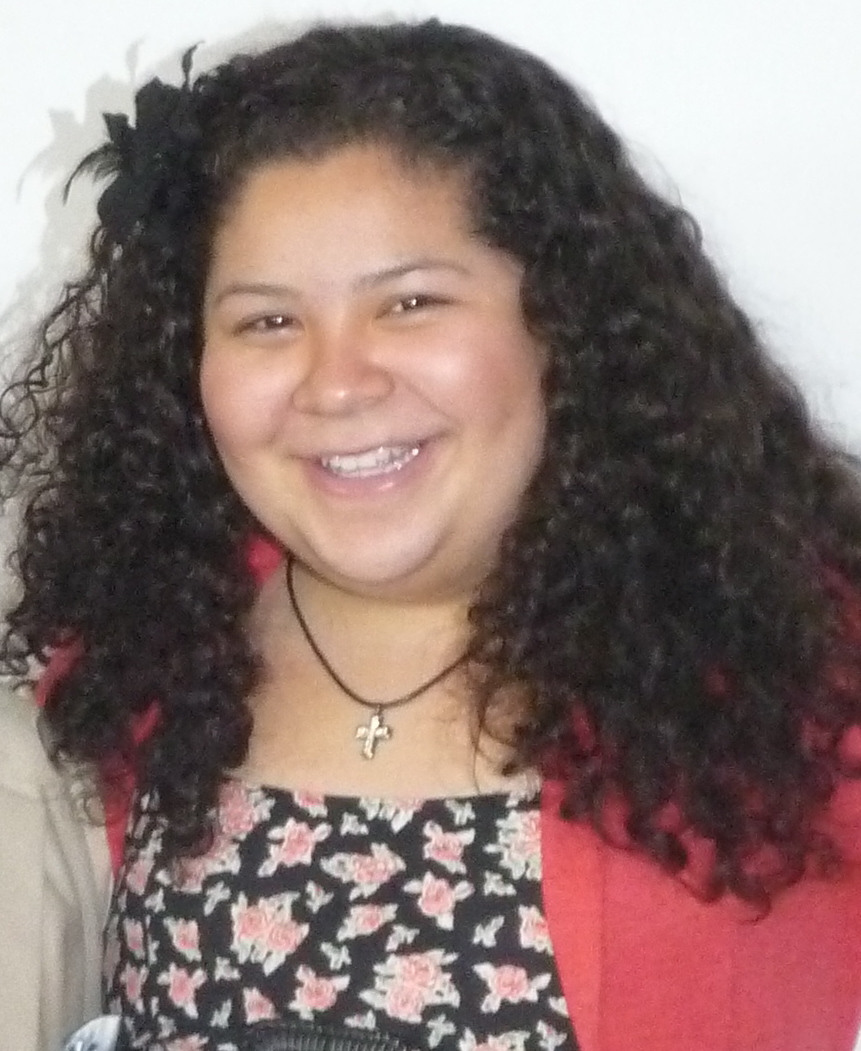
Raini Rodriguez

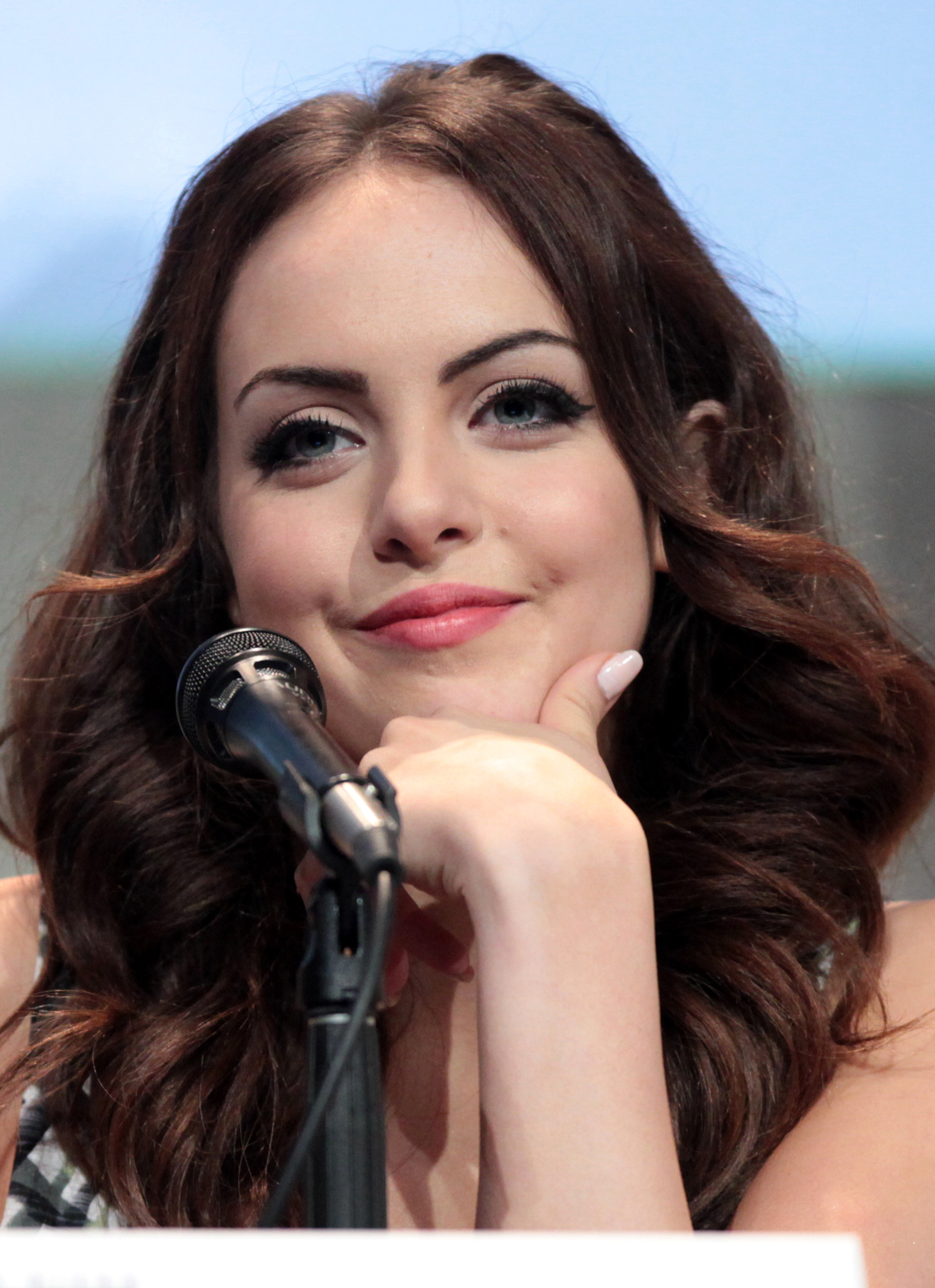
Elizabeth Gillies

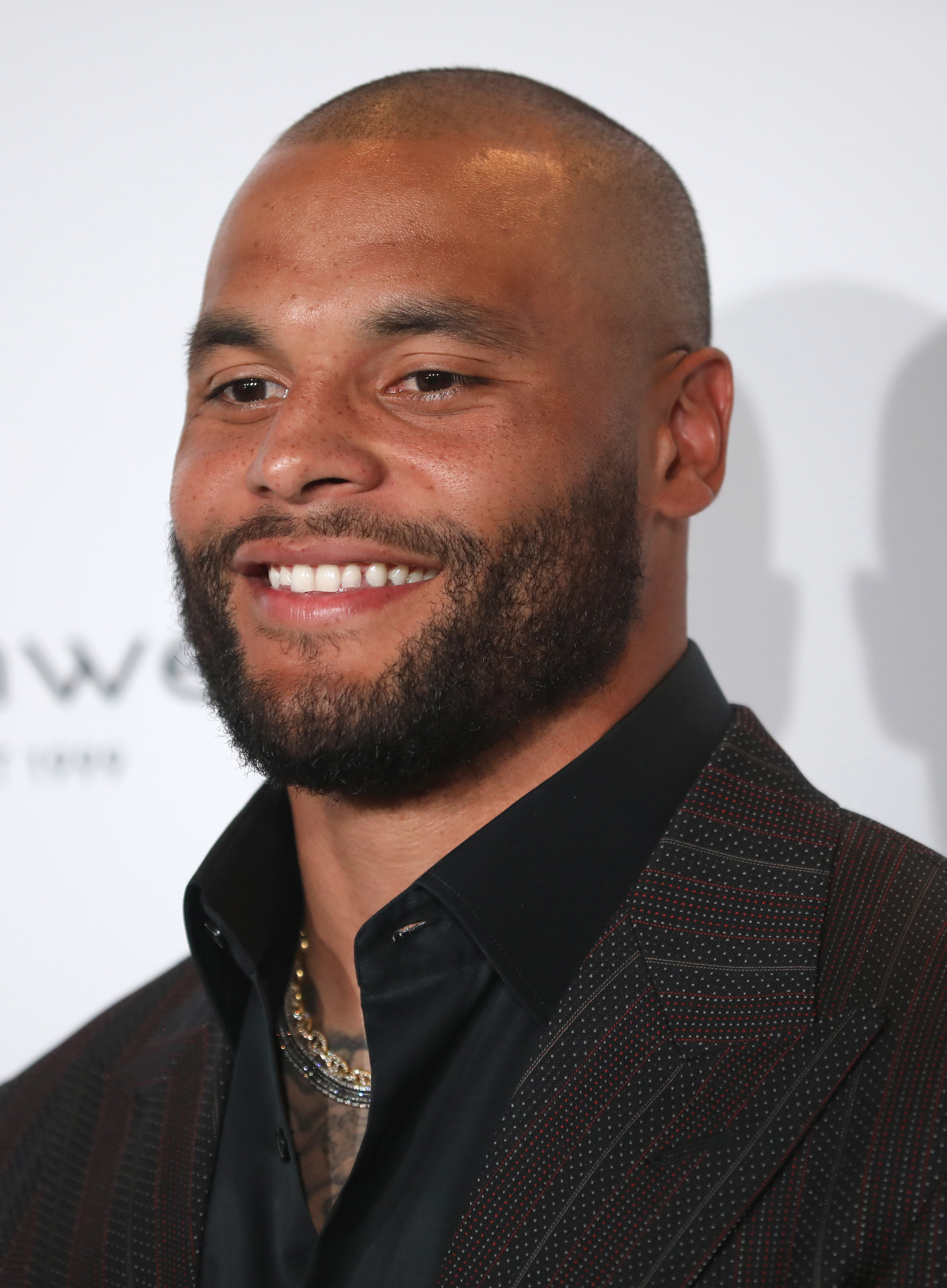
Dak Prescott

- July 1 – Raini Rodriguez, actress and singer
- July 2
  - Kamille, wrestler
  - Saweetie, rapper
- July 3 – Mathias Anderle, singer
- July 5 – Hollie Cavanagh, British-born singer
- July 7
  - Dominic Artis, American-born Kosovan basketball player
  - Ally Brooke, singer
  - Jackson Withrow, tennis player
- July 8 – Zach Auguste, basketball player
- July 9
  - DeAndre Yedlin, soccer player
- July 10 – Carlon Jeffery, actor
- July 11 – Vincent Trocheck, ice hockey player
- July 16 – Eric Rahill, comedian, writer, and actor
- July 18 – Casey Veggies, rapper and songwriter
- July 21 – Aaron Durley, baseball player
- July 23 – Lili Simmons, actress and model
- July 24 – Lucas Adams, actor
- July 26
  - Elizabeth Gillies, actress and singer
  - Taylor Momsen, actress, musician, and model, frontwoman for The Pretty Reckless
- July 27
  - Nia Franklin, composer and bea pageant titleholder, Miss America 2019
  - Jordan Spieth, golfer
- July 28
  - Sammy Guevara, wrestler
  - La'Porsha Renae, singer
- July 29 – Dak Prescott, football player

=== August ===
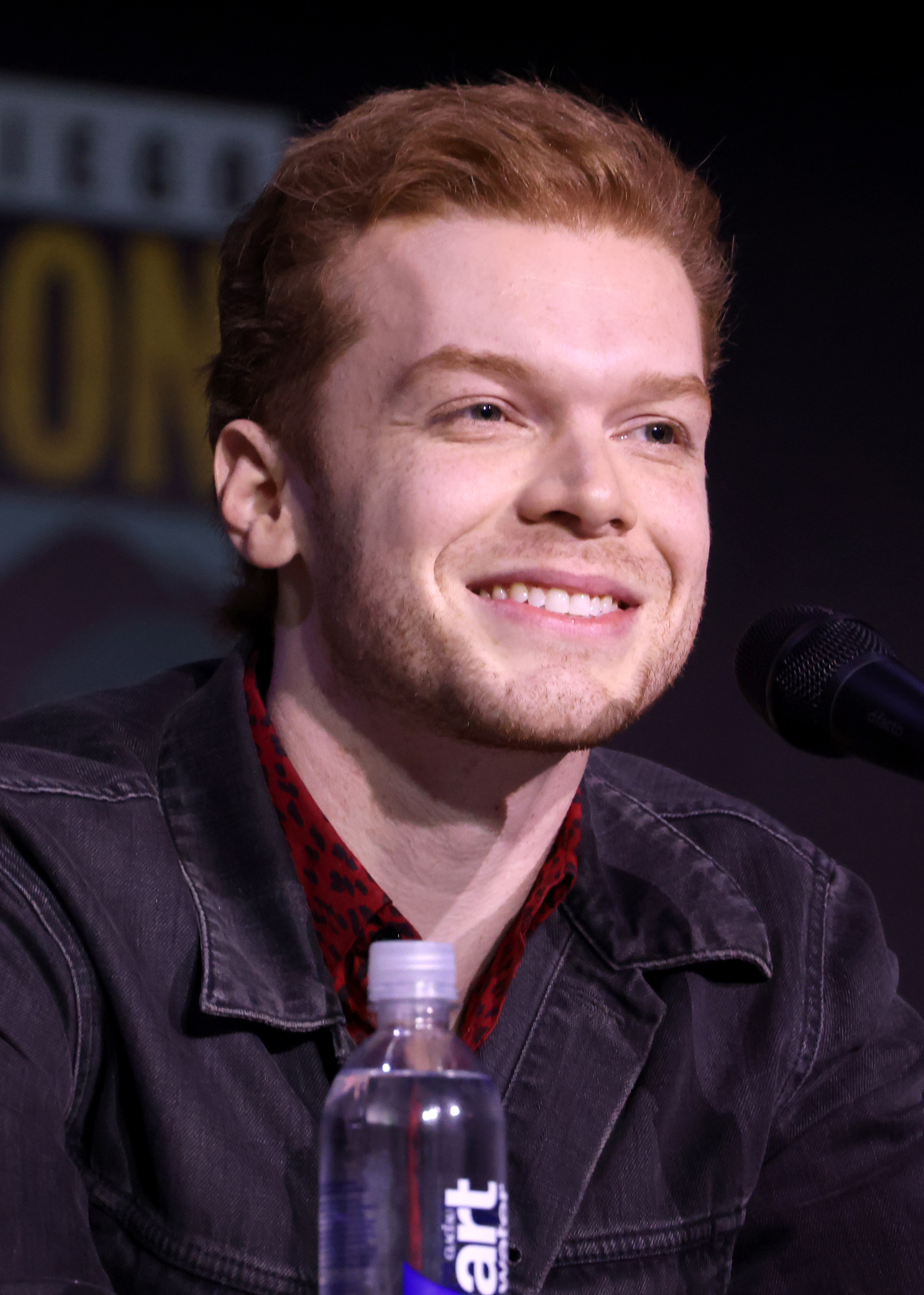
Cameron Monaghan

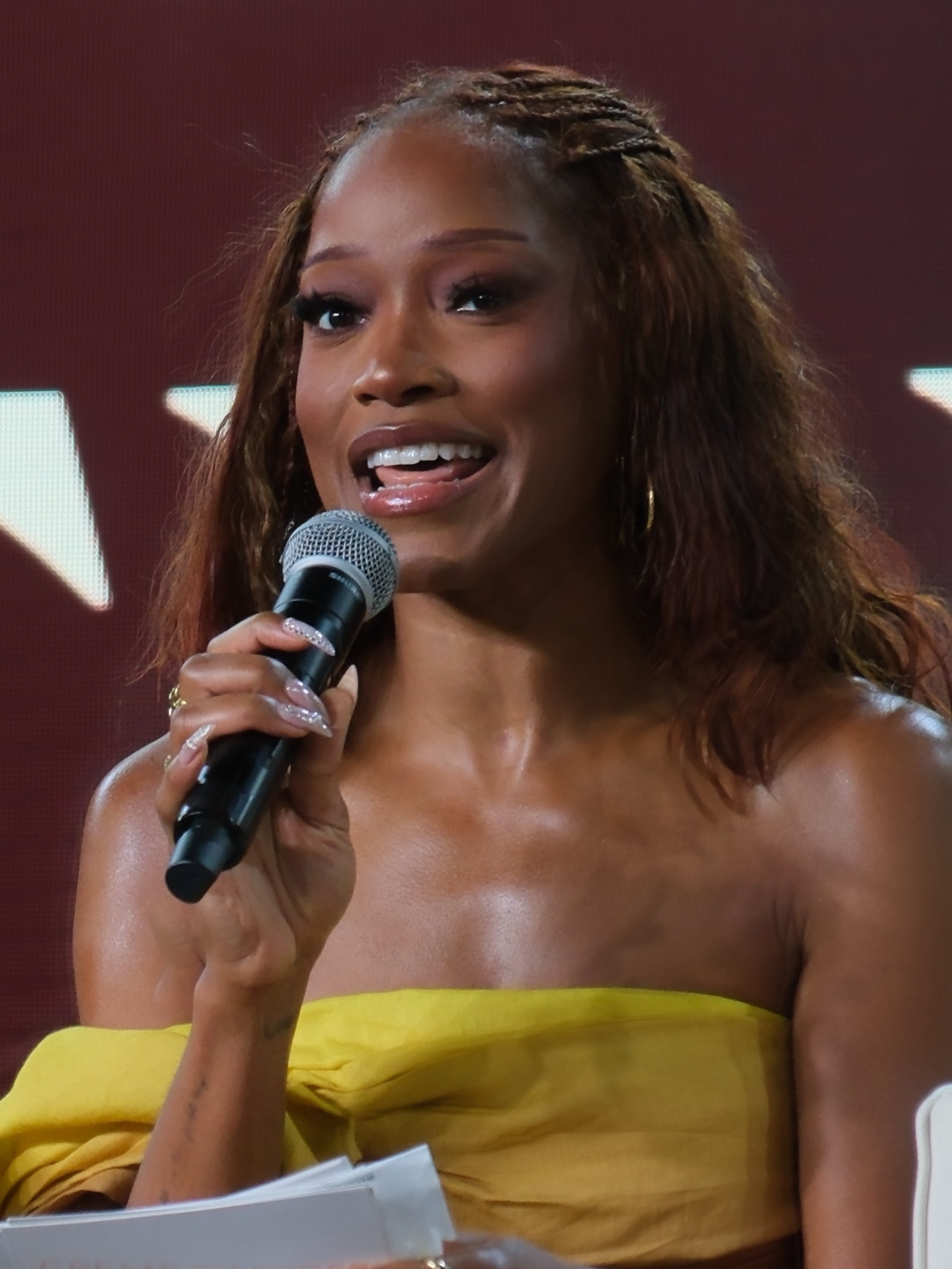
Keke Palmer

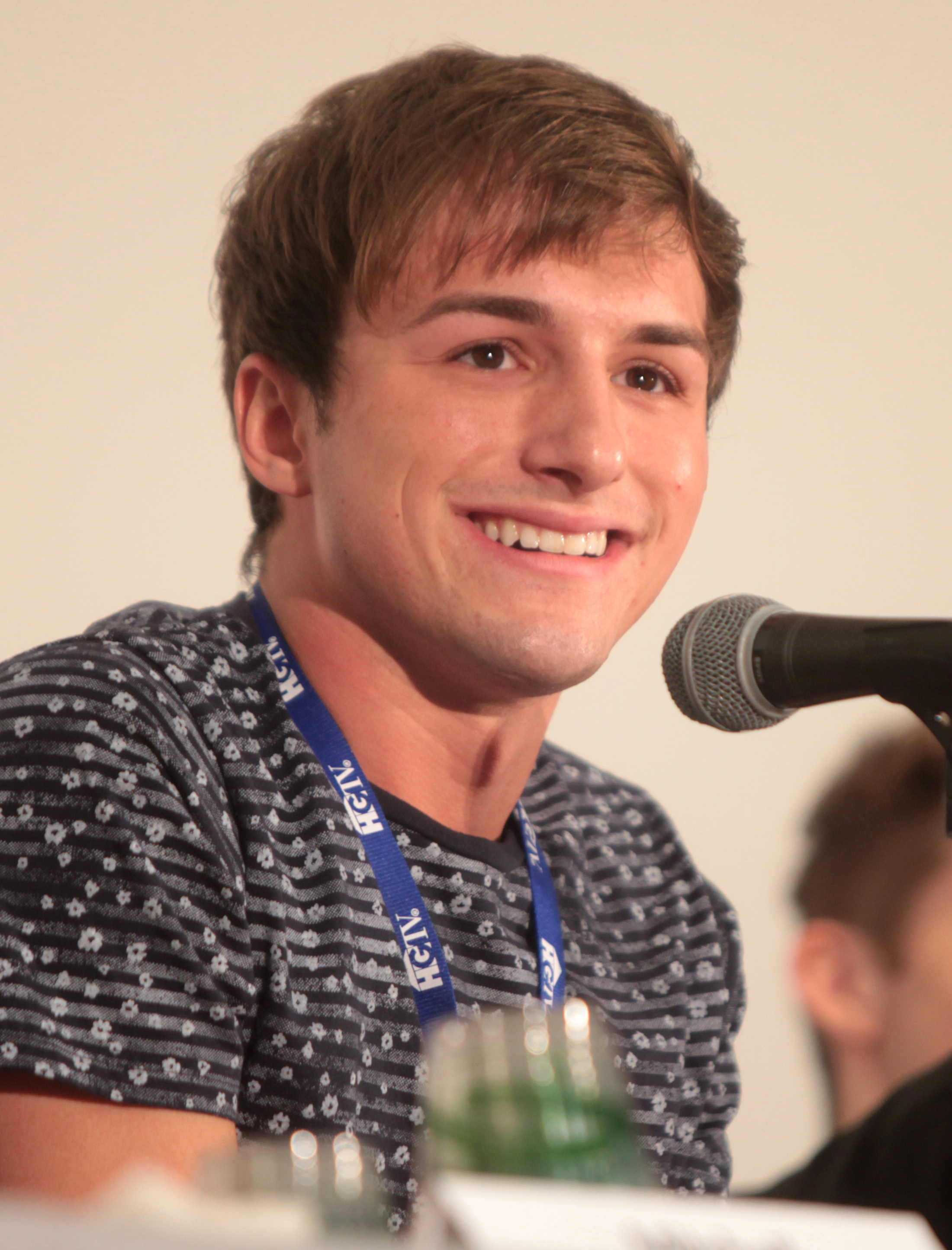
Lucas Cruikshank

- August 1 – Tomi Adeyemi, writer
- August 2 – Manika, singer/songwriter
- August 3 – Thomas Rawls, football player
- August 7 – Francesca Eastwood, actress, model, and socialite
- August 9
  - Heather Arseth, American-born Mauritian swimmer
  - Rydel Lynch, singer and actress
- August 11 – Alyson Stoner, actress, dancer, and singer
- August 13
  - William Arndt, football player
  - Kevin Cordes, swimmer
  - Johnny Gaudreau, ice hockey player (d. 2024)
- August 16 – Cameron Monaghan, actor
- August 20 – MK Nobilette, singer
- August 22
  - Dillon Danis, martial artist
  - Yvie Oddly, drag performer
- August 25 – Alex Arlitt, soccer player
- August 26
  - Aaron Adeoye, football player
  - Hameed Ali, basketball player
  - Keke Palmer, actress and singer
- August 27 – Dara Alizadeh, American-born Bermudan Olympic rower
- August 28 – Chad Buchanan, actor and model
- August 29
  - Chase Allen, football player
  - Lucas Cruikshank, actor and YouTube personality

=== September ===
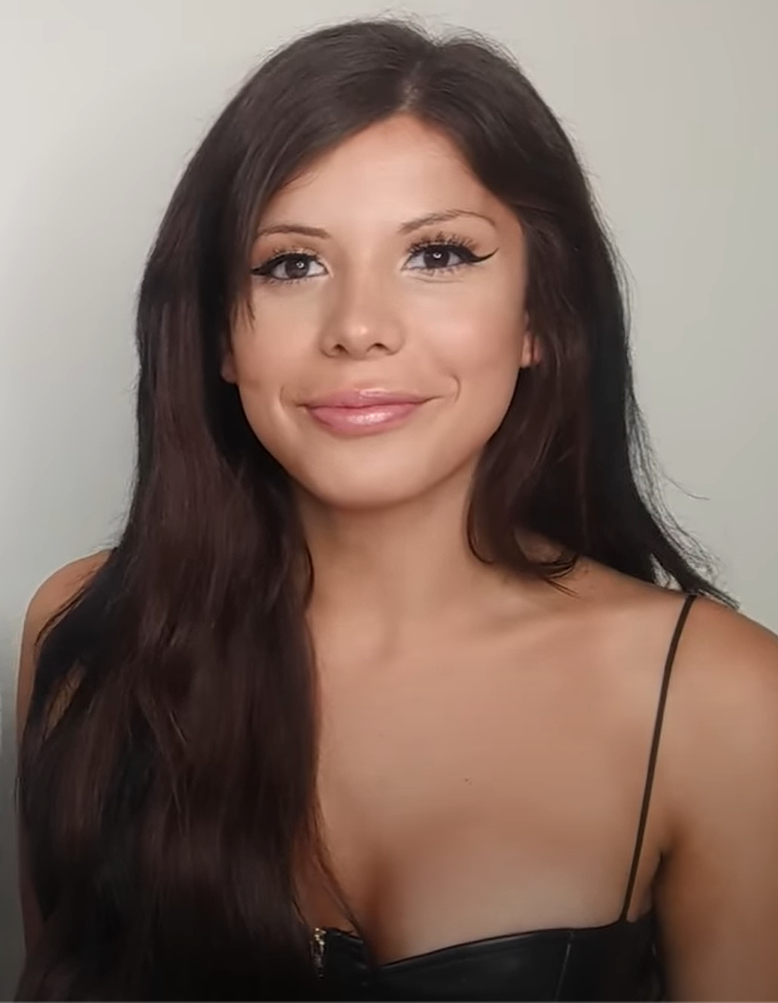
Blaire White

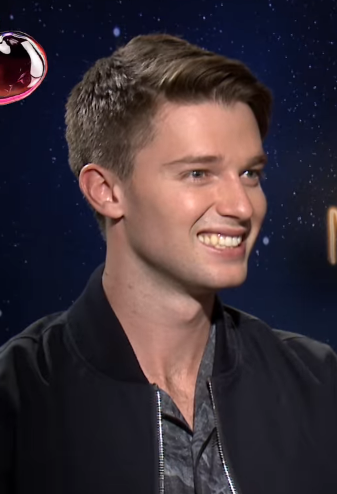
Patrick Schwarzenegger

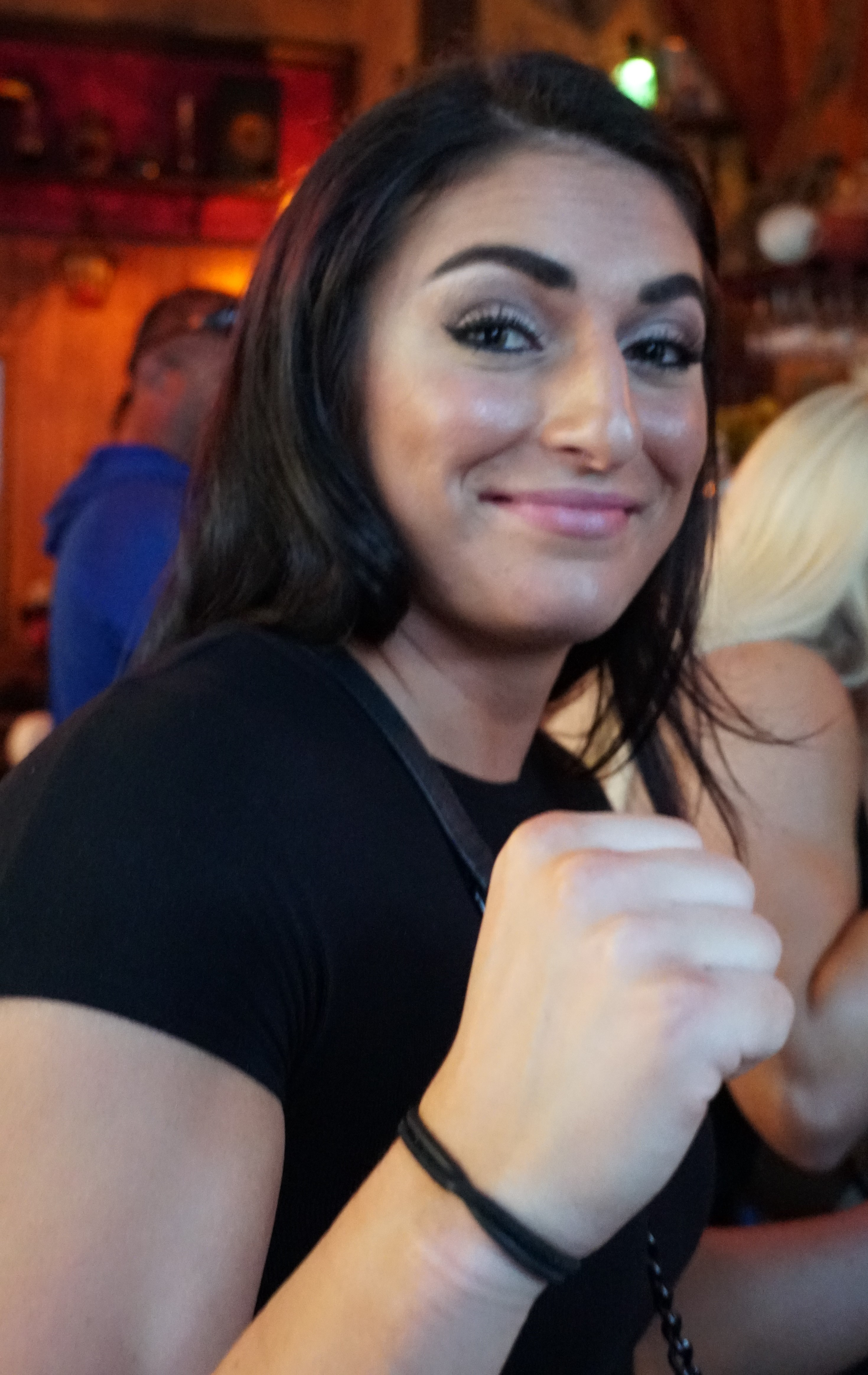
Sonya Deville

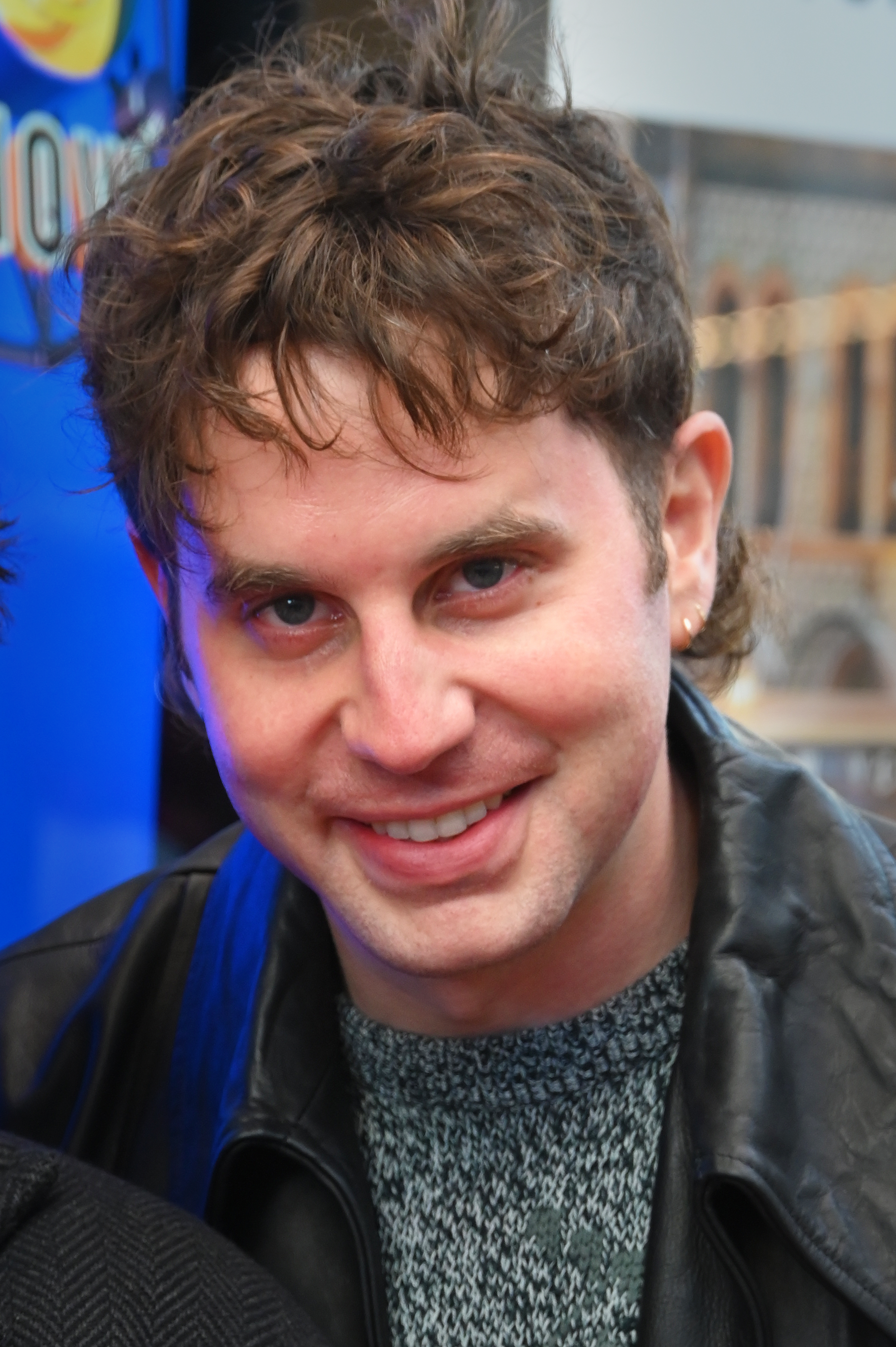
Ben Platt

- September 1 – Megan Nicole, singer/songwriter
- September 5
  - Diogo Abreu, American-born Portuguese Olympic gymnast
  - Gage Golightly, actress
- September 6
  - Austin Aune, football player
  - Famous Dex, rapper
- September 7
  - Quinton Alston, football player
  - Taylor Gray, actor and model
- September 9 – Brian Pillman Jr., wrestler
- September 10 – Sarah Logan, wrestler
- September 11 – Farrah Moan, drag queen and entertainer
- September 12 – Kelsea Ballerini, singer/songwriter
- September 14
  - Ashley Caldwell, freestyle skier
  - Blaire White, transgender YouTuber
- September 16
  - Metro Boomin, record producer, songwriter, and DJ
  - Bryson DeChambeau, golfer
- September 18 – Patrick Schwarzenegger, actor and model
- September 19 – Mo Alie-Cox, football and basketball player
- September 20 – Kyle Anderson, American-born Chinese basketball player
- September 23 – Duke Johnson, football player
- September 24
  - Sonya Deville, wrestler
  - Ben Platt, actor and singer
- September 25 – Zach Tyler Eisen, voice actor
- September 27 – Brandon Alexander, football player
- September 30
  - Raveena Aurora, singer/songwriter
  - Cameron Grimes, wrestler
  - Rylo Rodriguez, rapper

=== October ===
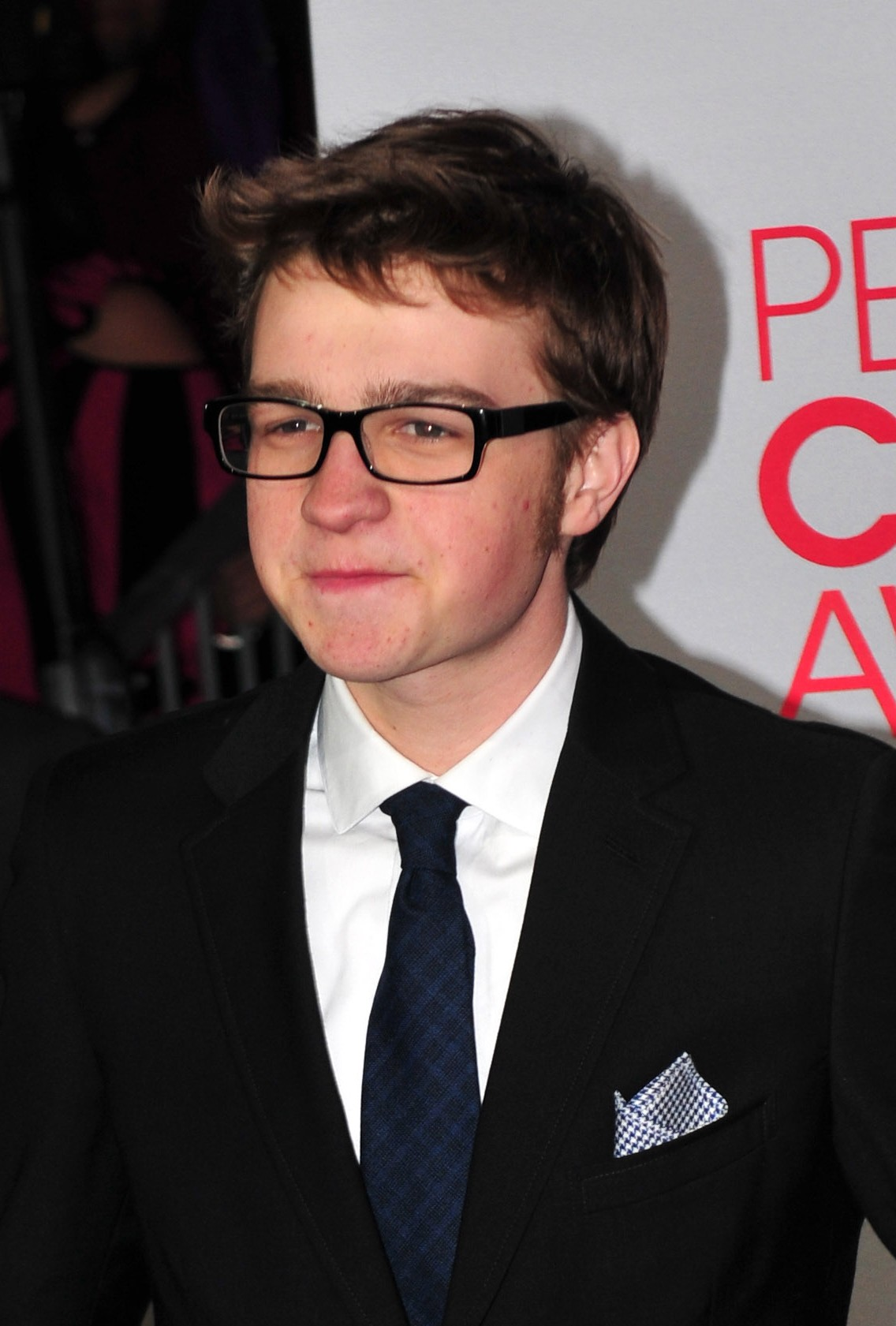
Angus T. Jones

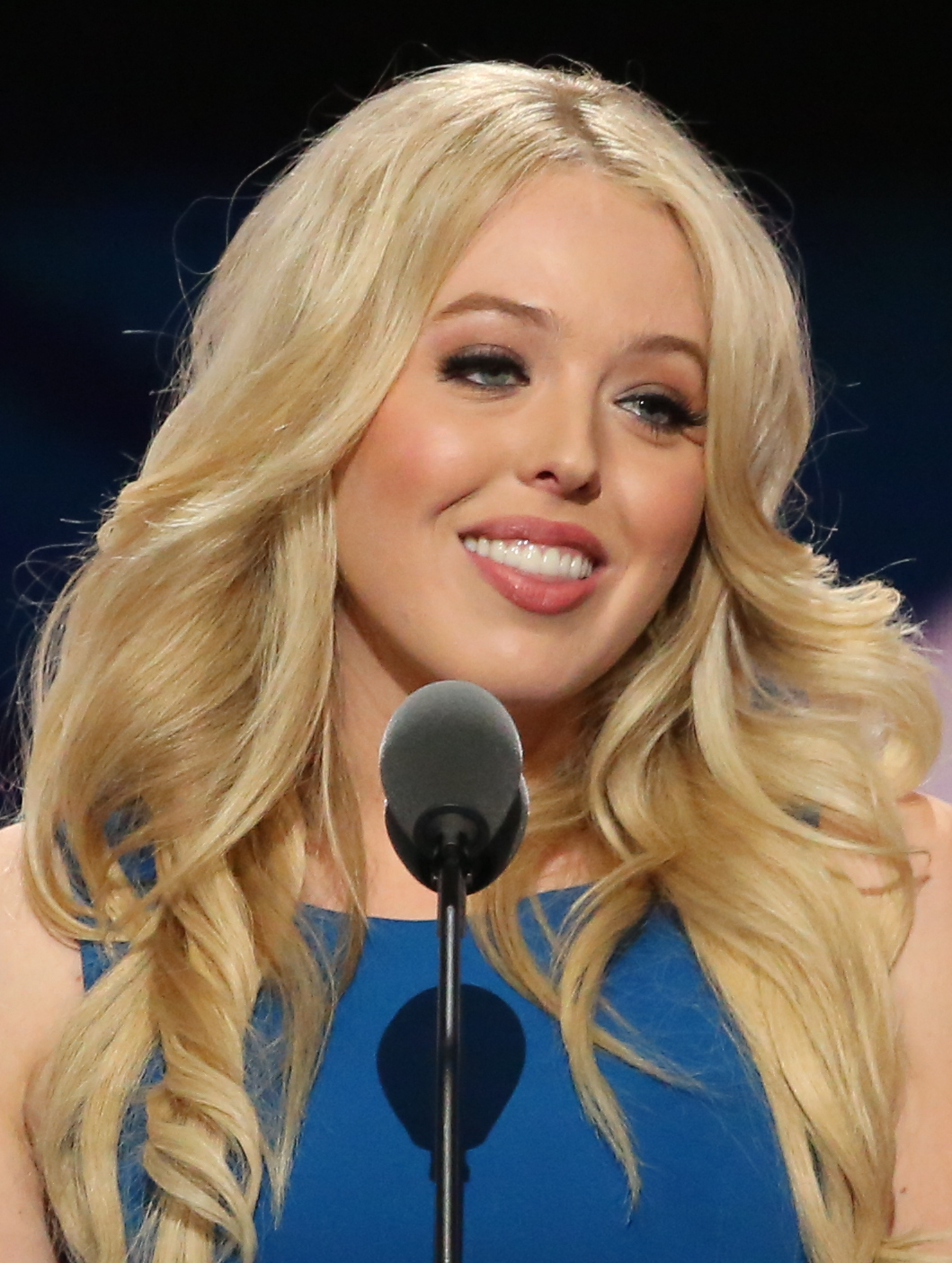
Tiffany Trump

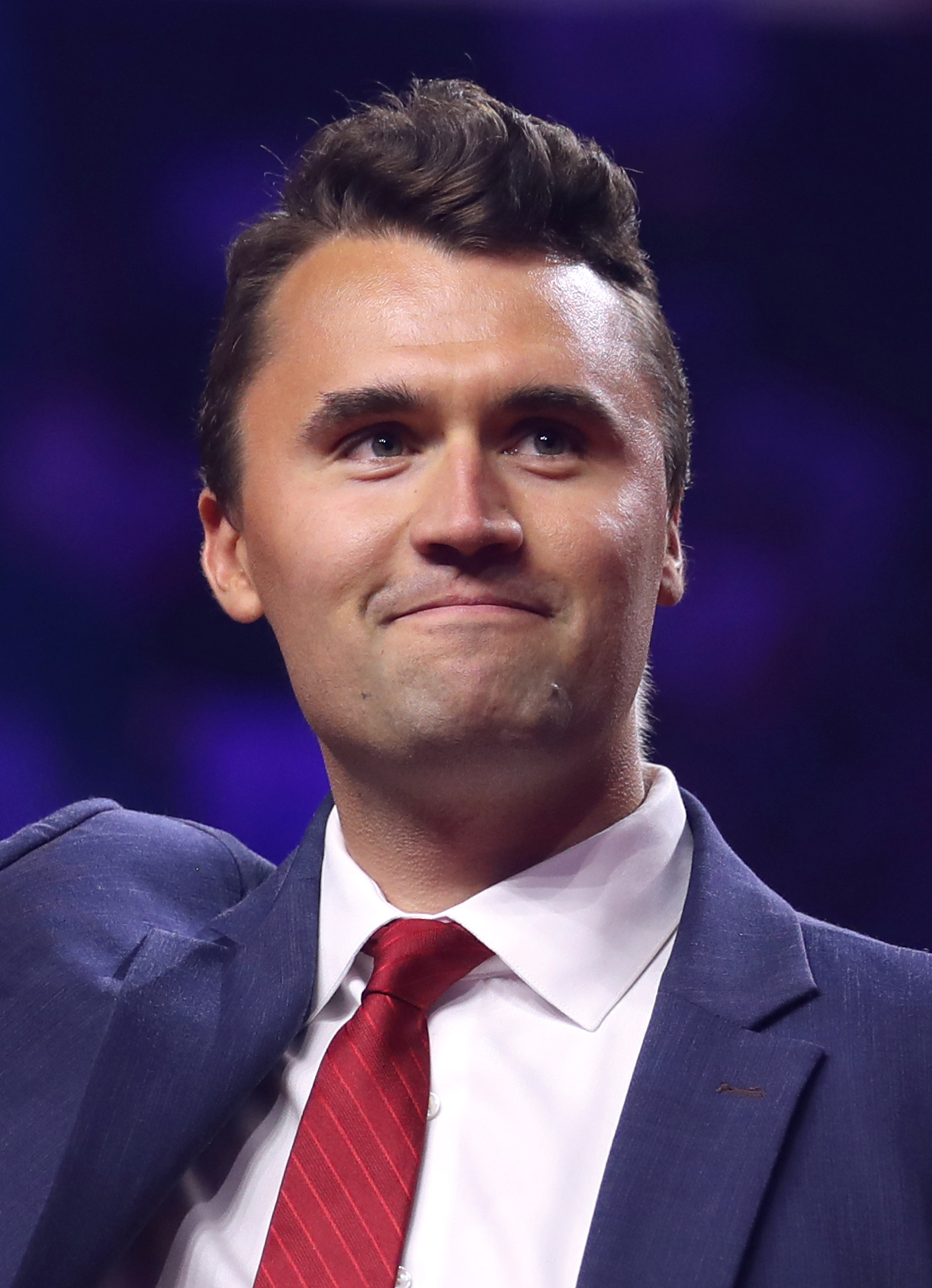
Charlie Kirk

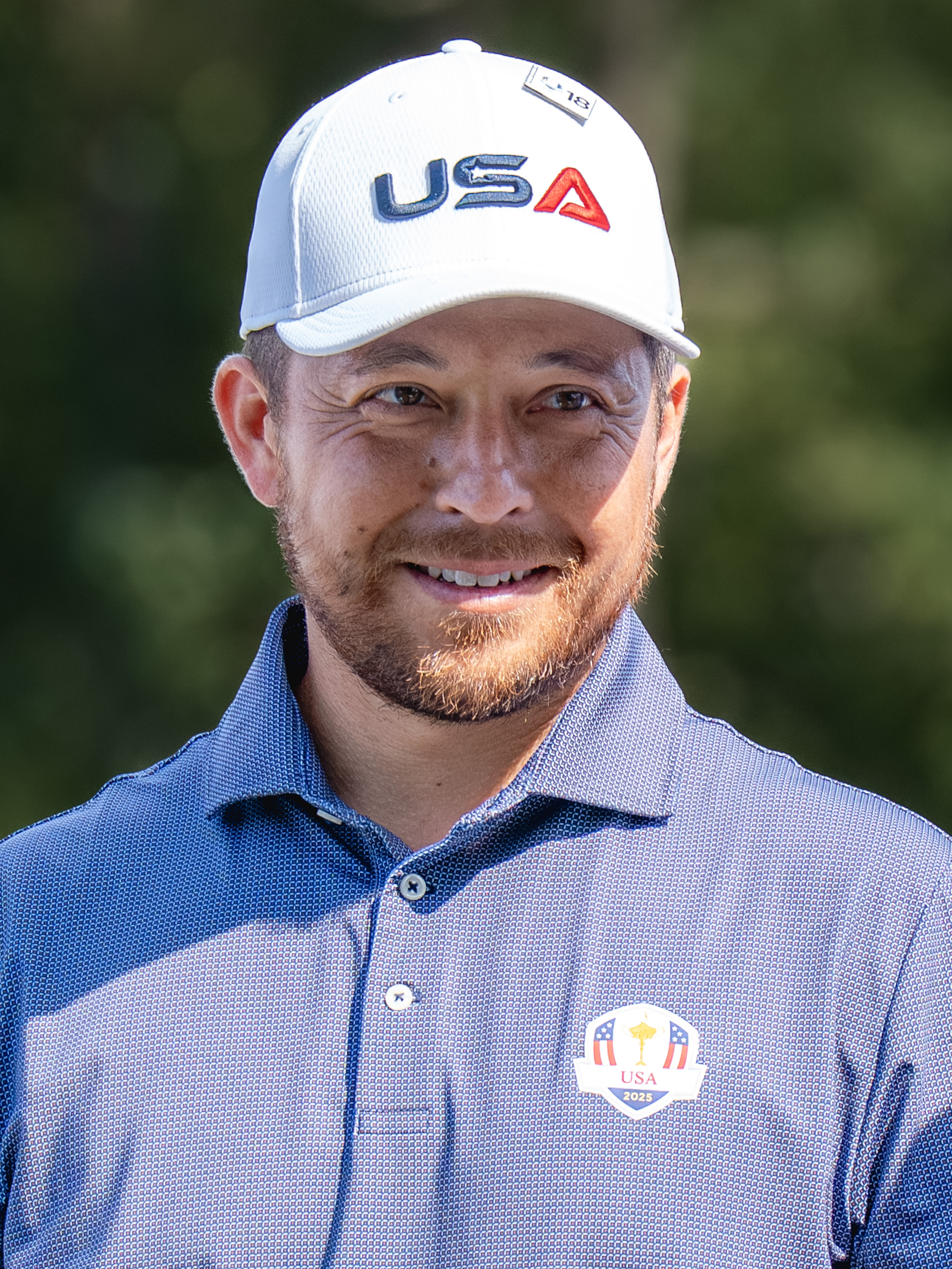
Xander Schauffele

- October 1 – Grayson Murray, golfer (d. 2024)
- October 2
  - Tara Lynne Barr, actress
  - William Haynes, media personality
- October 4 – Nick Arbuckle, football player
- October 5 – Mikey Ambrose, soccer player
- October 6 – Jourdan Miller, actress
- October 8
  - Brandon Allen, soccer player
  - Molly C. Quinn, actress
  - Angus T. Jones, actor
  - Saucy Santana, rapper
- October 9
  - Lauren Davis, tennis player
  - Scotty McCreery, singer-songwriter and guitarist
- October 11
  - CJ Albertson, long-distance runner
  - Brandon Flynn, actor
- October 12 – Bralon Addison, football player
- October 13 – Tiffany Trump, socialite and model
- October 14 – Charlie Kirk, conservative commentator (d. 2025)
- October 17 – Witney Carson, dancer and choreographer
- October 19
  - Akira, wrestler
  - Hunter King, actress
- October 21
  - Fatai Alashe, soccer player
  - Brian Allen, football player
  - Kane Brown, country singer/songwriter
- October 22 – Omer Adam, American-born Israeli singer
- October 23
  - 1 Called Manders, wrestler
  - Taylor Spreitler, actress
- October 25
  - Isaiah Austin, basketball player and coach
  - Xander Schauffele, golfer
- October 26 – Drew Gooden, comedian
- October 27 – Troy Gentile, actor
- October 30 – Marcus Mariota, American football player

=== November ===
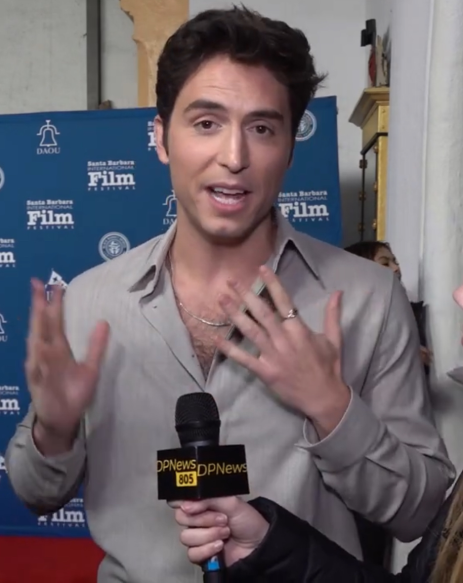
Benito Skinner

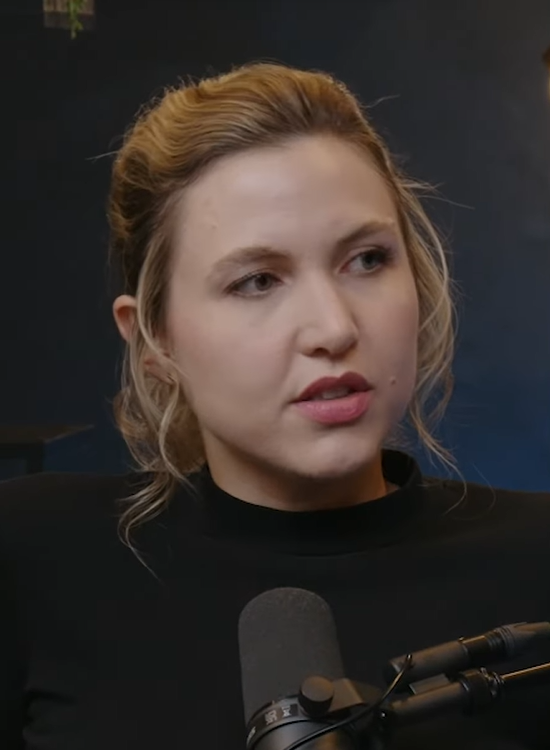
Taylor Tomlinson

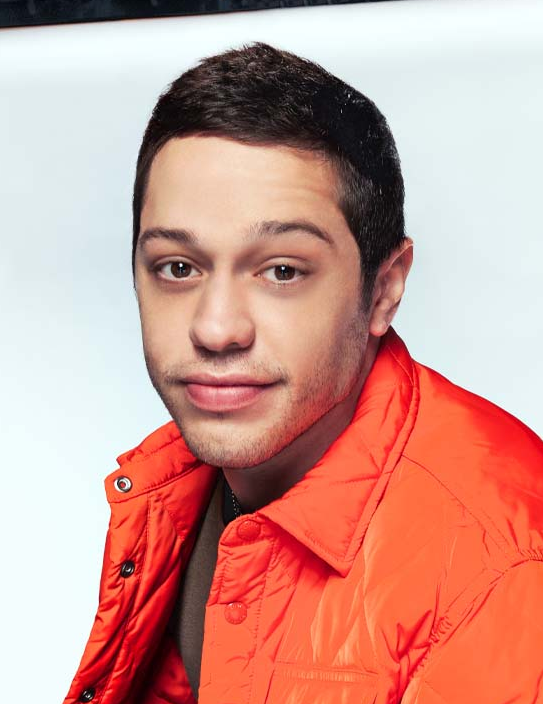
Pete Davidson

- November 3 – Benito Skinner, online personality
- November 4
  - Roberto Albuquerque, soccer player
  - Taylor Tomlinson, comedian
- November 6 – Dearica Hamby, basketball player
- November 8
  - Cody Arens, actor
  - Tommy Armstrong Jr., football player
- November 9 – Steven Taylor, cricketer
- November 11 – Sam Abbas, Egyptian-born director, screenwriter, and producer
- November 12 – Mackensie Alexander, football player
- November 13 – Blake Aoki, American-born Japanese basketball player
- November 15 – Arik Armstead, football player
- November 16
  - Josh Adams, basketball player
  - Pete Davidson, comedian
- November 19 – Justin Anderson, basketball player
- November 27
  - Hannah Brandt, ice hockey player
  - Aubrey Peeples, actress and singer
- November 28
  - Shiann Darkangelo, ice hockey player
  - Bryshere Y. Gray, actor and rapper
  - Adam Hicks, actor
- November 29
  - Okezie Alozie, football player
  - Stefon Diggs, football player
  - David Lambert, actor
- November 30 – Kevon Seymour, football player

=== December ===
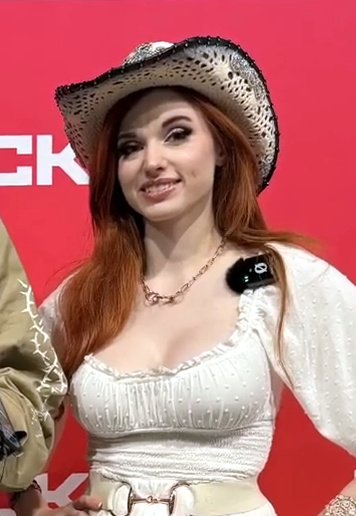
Amouranth

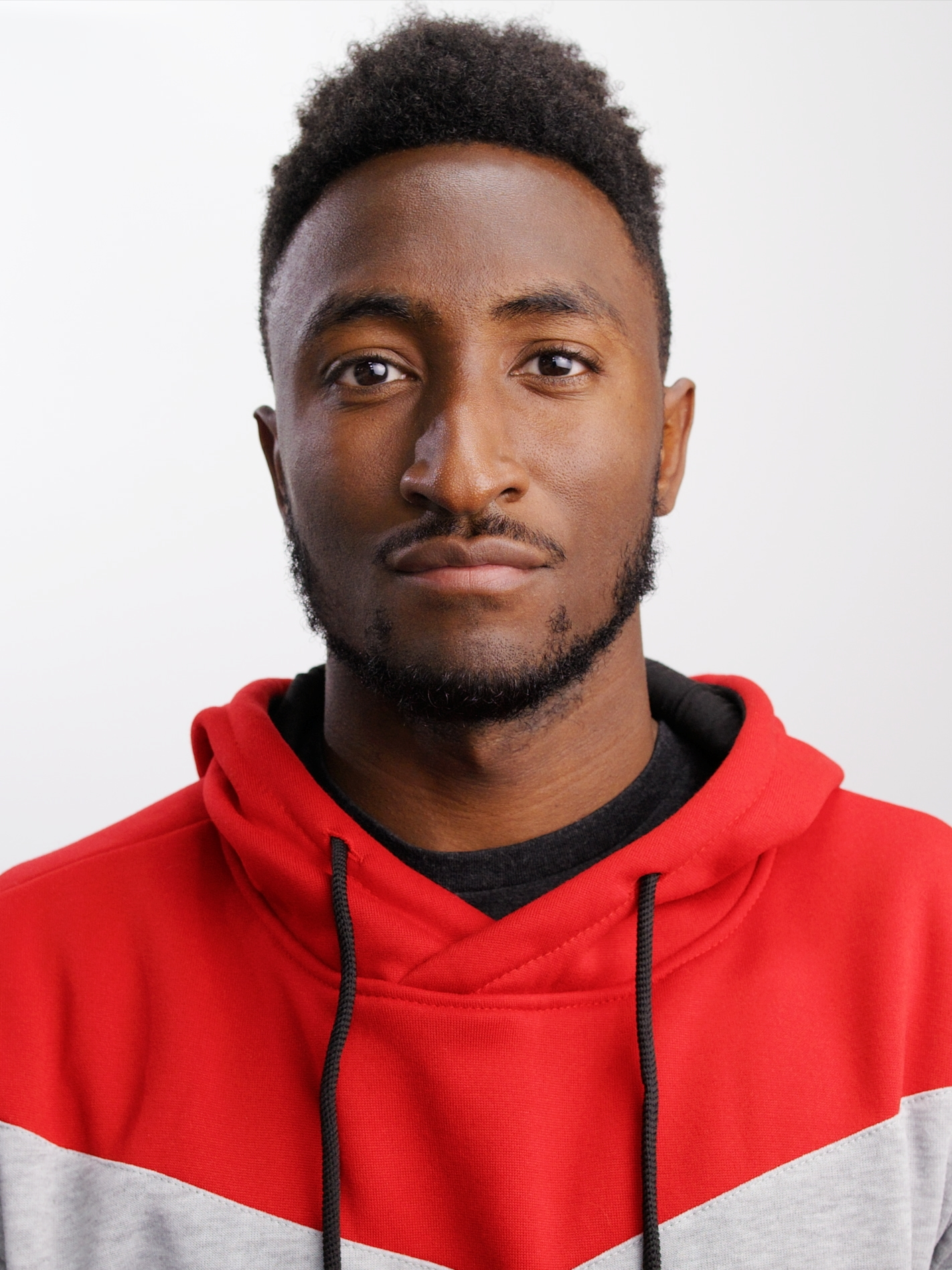
Marques Brownlee

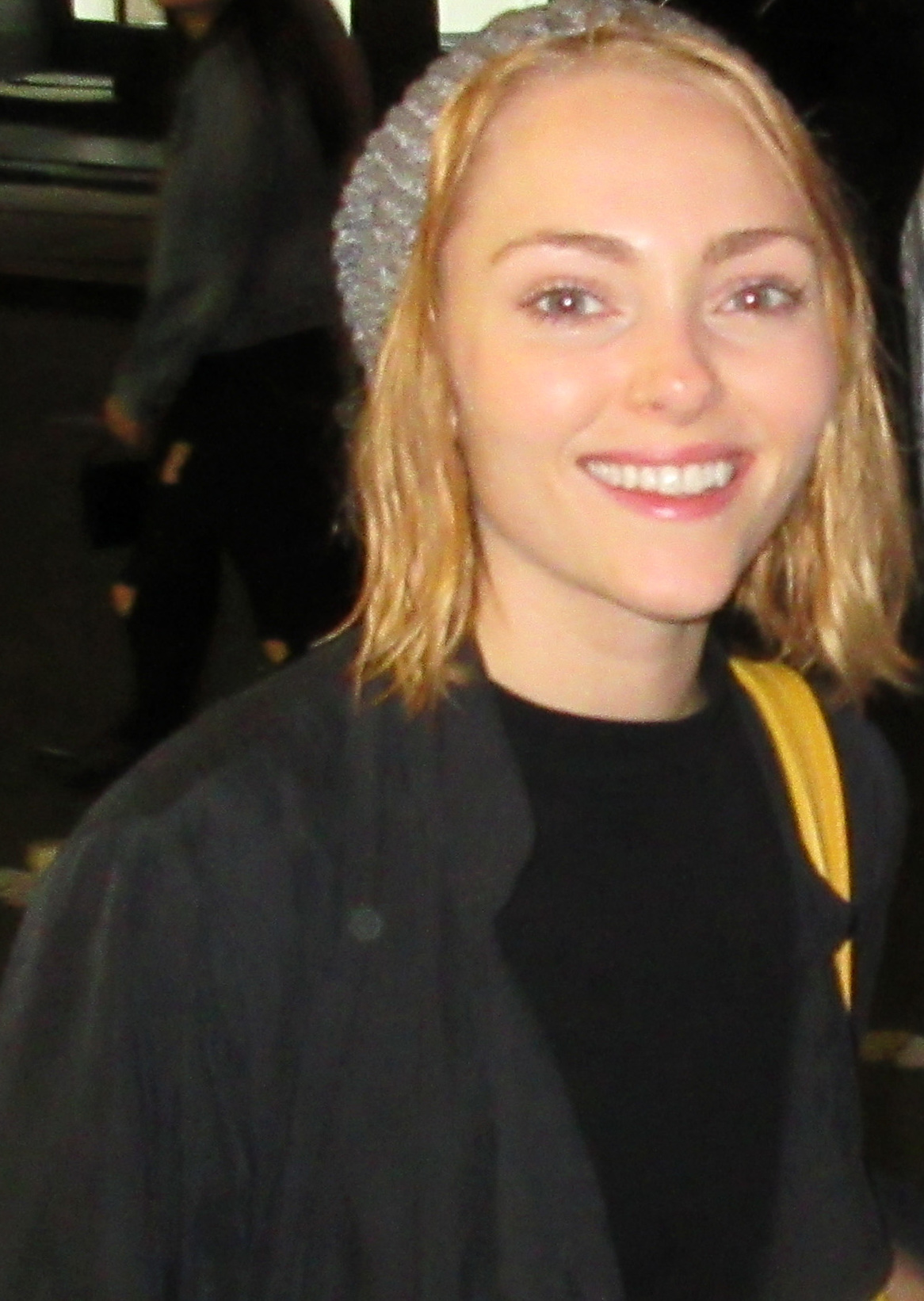
AnnaSophia Robb

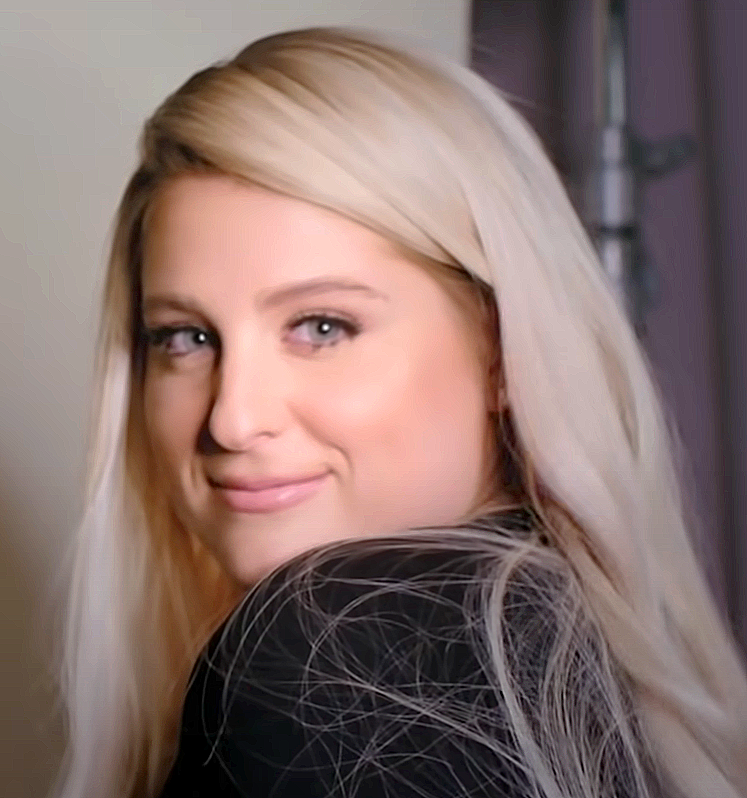
Meghan Trainor

- December 1 – Drakeo the Ruler, rapper (d. 2021)
- December 2
  - Amouranth, internet personality
  - Dylan McLaughlin, actor
- December 3 – Marques Brownlee, YouTuber
- December 5 – Tejay Antone, baseball player
- December 7 – Jasmine Villegas, singer
- December 8 – AnnaSophia Robb, actress
- December 10 – Joey Salads, YouTuber
- December 11
  - Jenny Arthur, Olympic weightlifter
  - Sonny Kiss, wrestler
- December 12 – Rilwan Alowonle, American-born Nigerian hurdler
- December 15
  - Nida Allam, Canadian-born politician
  - Sydney Andrews, soccer player
- December 17 – Kiersey Clemons, actress
- December 18
  - Byron Buxton, baseball player
  - John Cihangir, actor, stuntman and YouTuber
- December 19
  - Ryan Arambula, soccer player
  - Corey Snide, actor and dancer
- December 21 – Jinger Vuolo, author
- December 22
  - Joseph David-Jones, actor
  - Aliana Lohan, actress and model
  - Meghan Trainor, singer
- December 25 – Andrea Drews, volleyball player
- December 29 – Terry Allen, basketball player
- December 30 – Bradley Adkins, Olympic high jumper
- December 31 – Ryan Blaney, race car driver

=== Full date unknown ===
- 30 Roc, record producer and songwriter
- Paul Abrahamian, television personality and fashion designer
- Joo Won Ahn, South Korean-born ballet dancer
- David Onri Anderson, painter, musician, and curator
- Anjimile, singer/songwriter
- Austin Armstrong, football player and coach
- Heather Artinian, hearing-impaired lawyer
- David Benoit, wrestler and son of Chris Benoit

== Deaths ==
=== January ===
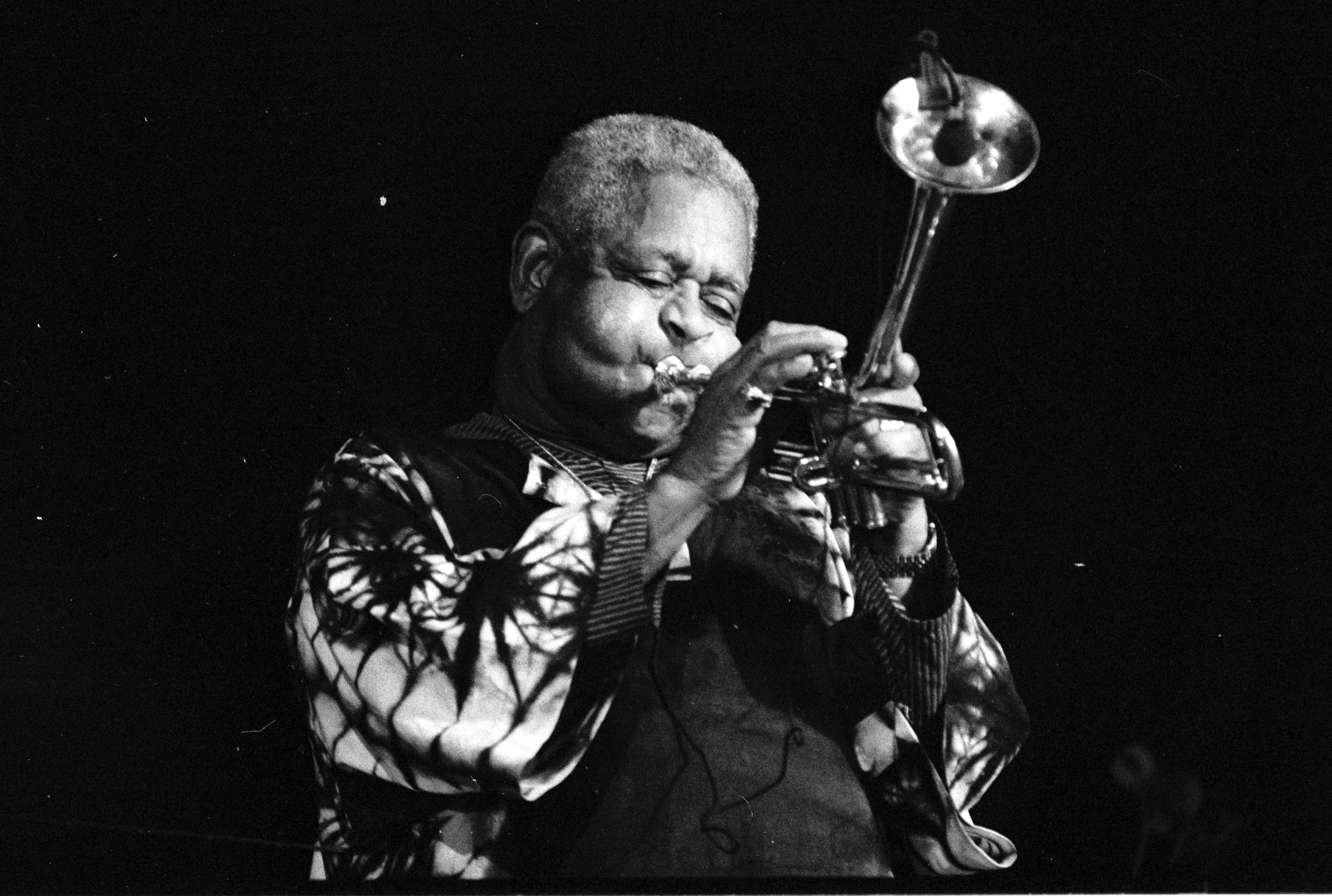
Dizzy Gillespie

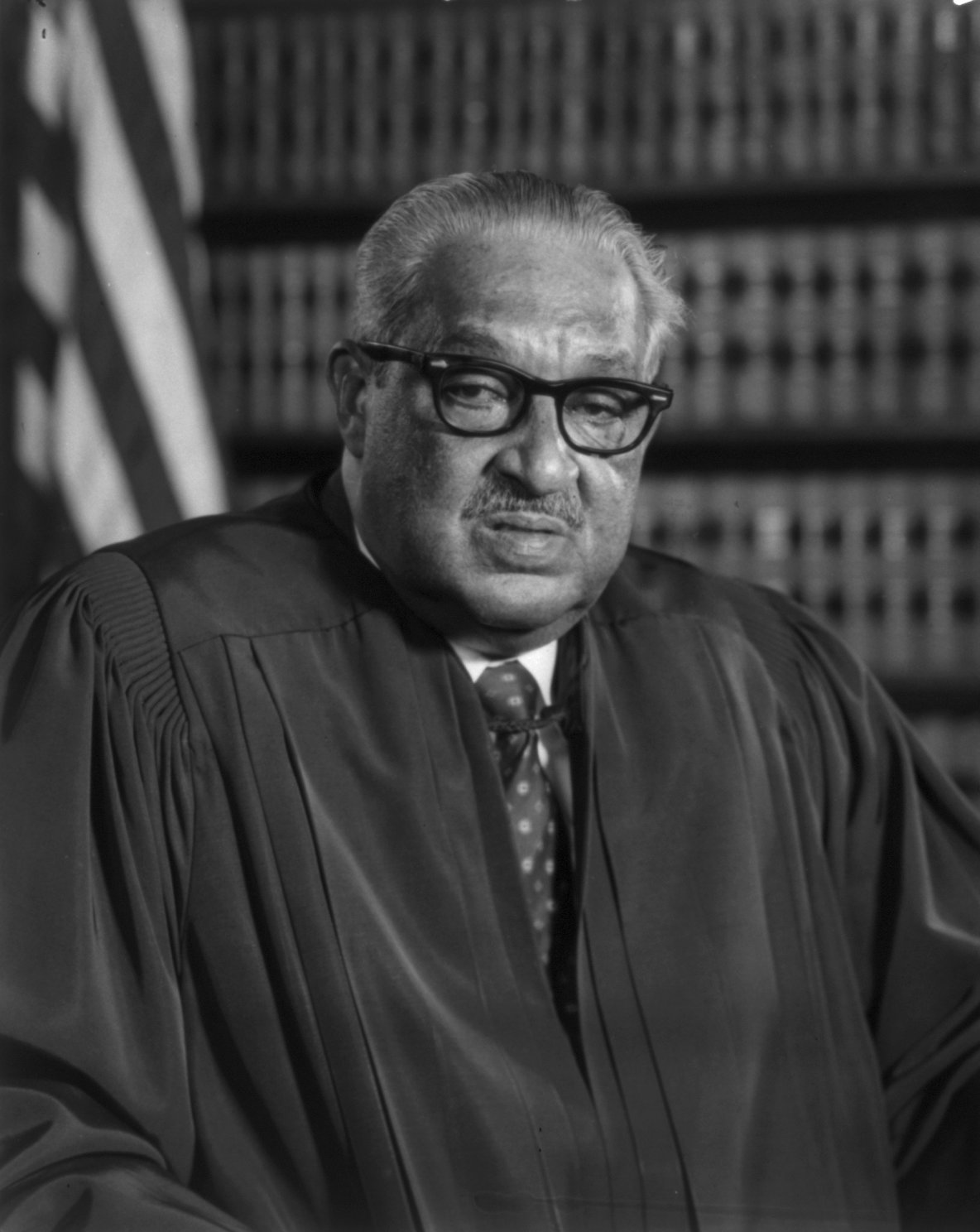
Thurgood Marshall

- January 1
  - Eddie Arning, American outsider artist (b. 1898)
  - Jean Mayer, French-born American scientist (b. 1920)
- January 3
  - Johnny Most, American sportscaster (b. 1923)
  - Bill Walls, American football player and coach (b. 1912)
- January 6 – Dizzy Gillespie, American musician, bandleader, singer and composer (b. 1917)
- January 7 – Fred Kohler Jr., actor (b. 1911)
- January 10
  - Diana Adams, American ballet dancer (b. 1926)
  - Luther Gulick, expert on public administration (b. 1892)
- January 15
  - Sammy Cahn, American lyricist (b. 1913)
  - Henry Iba, American basketball coach and college athletics administrator (b. 1904)
- January 16
  - Phil Chambers, American actor (b. 1916)
  - Glenn Corbett, American actor (b. 1930)
  - Fred Cochrane, American boxer; welterweight champion between 1941 and 1946 (b. 1915)
  - Stan Sheriff, American football player, coach, and college athletics administrator (b. 1932)
- January 19
  - Reginald Lewis, American businessman (b. 1942)
  - Chris Street, American college basketball player (b. 1972)
- January 21 – Charlie Gehringer, American baseball player (b. 1903)
- January 22 – Jim Pollard, American professional basketball player and coach (b. 1922)
- January 23
  - Thomas A. Dorsey, American musician (b. 1899)
  - Keith Laumer, American science fiction author (b. 1925)
- January 24 – Thurgood Marshall, American jurist, First African-American on the Supreme Court (b. 1908)
- January 25 – Bernard Joseph Smith, American marathon runner; winner of the 1942 Boston Marathon (b. 1917)
- January 27 – J. T. King, American football player, coach, and college athletics administrator (b. 1912)
- January 28 – Vern Kennedy, American MLB pitcher (b. 1907)
- January 29
  - Gustav Hasford, American marine, novelist, journalist, poet and book thief (b. 1947)
  - Ron Kostelnik, American football player in the National Football League (b. 1940)
- January 30 – Julia Davis Adams, American author and journalist (b. 1900)

=== February ===
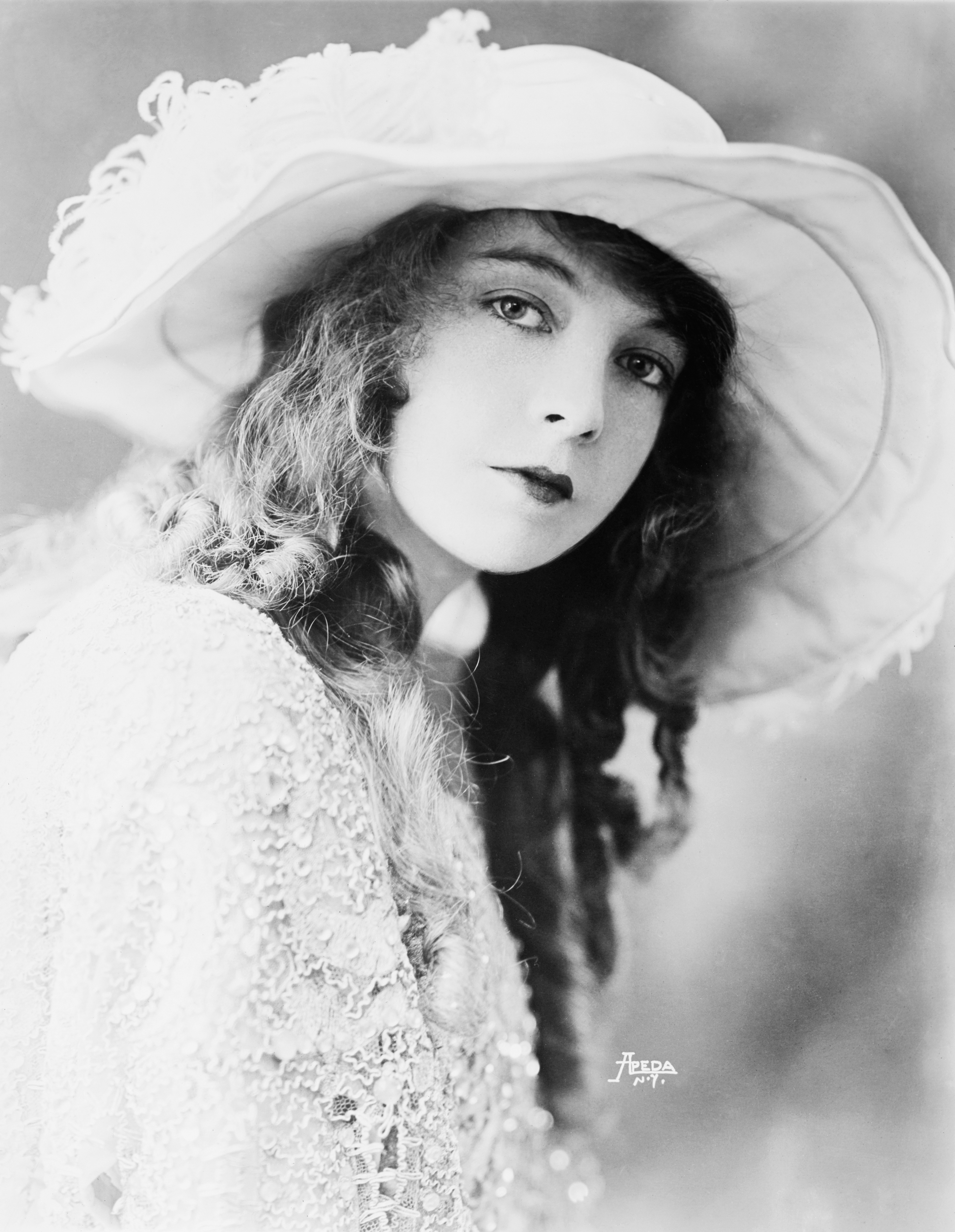
Lillian Gish

- February 5 – Joseph L. Mankiewicz, American screenwriter and producer (b. 1909)
- February 6 – Arthur Ashe, American tennis player (b. 1943)
- February 7 – Buddy Pepper, American songwriter and accompanist (b. 1922)
- February 9 – Kate Wilkinson, American stage and television actress (b. 1916)
- February 11
  - Joy Garrett, American actor and vocalist (b. 1945)
  - Robert W. Holley, American biochemist, Nobel Prize laureate (b. 1922)
- February 18 – Kerry Von Erich, American professional wrestler (b. 1960)
- February 23 – Phillip Terry, American actor (b. 1909)
- February 25
  - Toy Caldwell, American musician (b. 1947)
  - Eddie Constantine, American-born French actor and singer (b. 1917)
- February 26 – Beaumont Newhall, American curator (b. 1908)
- February 27 – Lillian Gish, American actress (b. 1893)
- February 28 – Ruby Keeler, American actress (b. 1909)

=== March ===
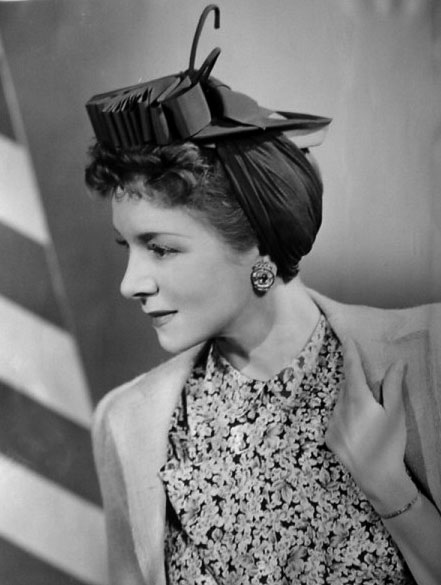
Helen Hayes

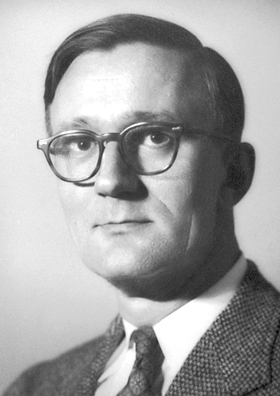
Polykarp Kusch

- March 1 – Terry Frost, American actor (b. 1906)
- March 3 – Albert Sabin, American biologist, developer of the oral polio vaccine (b. 1906)
- March 4 – Izaak Kolthoff, Dutch-born American chemist (b. 1894)
- March 7
  - Duane Carter, American racing driver (b. 1913)
  - Whitey Kachan, American basketball player (b. 1925)
  - Eleanor Sanger, American television producer (b. 1929)
  - Jim Spavital, American footballer (b. 1926)
  - Earl Wrightson, American singer and actor (b. 1913)
- March 8
  - Don Barksdale, American basketball player (b. 1923)
  - Billy Eckstine, American musician (b. 1914)
- March 9
  - Bob Crosby, American jazz singer and bandleader (b. 1913)
  - Max August Zorn, German-born mathematician (b. 1906)
- March 16 – Ralph Fults, America outlaw (b. 1910)
- March 17 – Helen Hayes, American actress (b. 1900)
- March 20
  - Percy Johnston, African-American poet, playwright, and professor (b. 1930)
  - Polykarp Kusch, German-born American physicist, Nobel Prize laureate (b. 1911)
  - Paul László, Hungarian-born architect (b. 1900)
- March 21 – Fred Phillips, American make-up artist (b. 1908)
- March 22 – Steve Olin, American baseball player (b. 1965)
- March 23 – Tim Crews, American baseball player (b. 1961)
- March 24 – John Hersey, American writer and journalist (b. 1914)
- March 26 – Louis Falco, American dancer and choreographer (b. 1942)
- March 27 – Elizabeth Holloway Marston, American psychologist (b. 1893)
- March 30 – Richard Diebenkorn, American painter (b. 1922)
- March 31
  - Brandon Lee, American actor and martial artist, son of Bruce Lee (b. 1965)
  - Mitchell Parish, American lyricist (b. 1900)

=== April ===
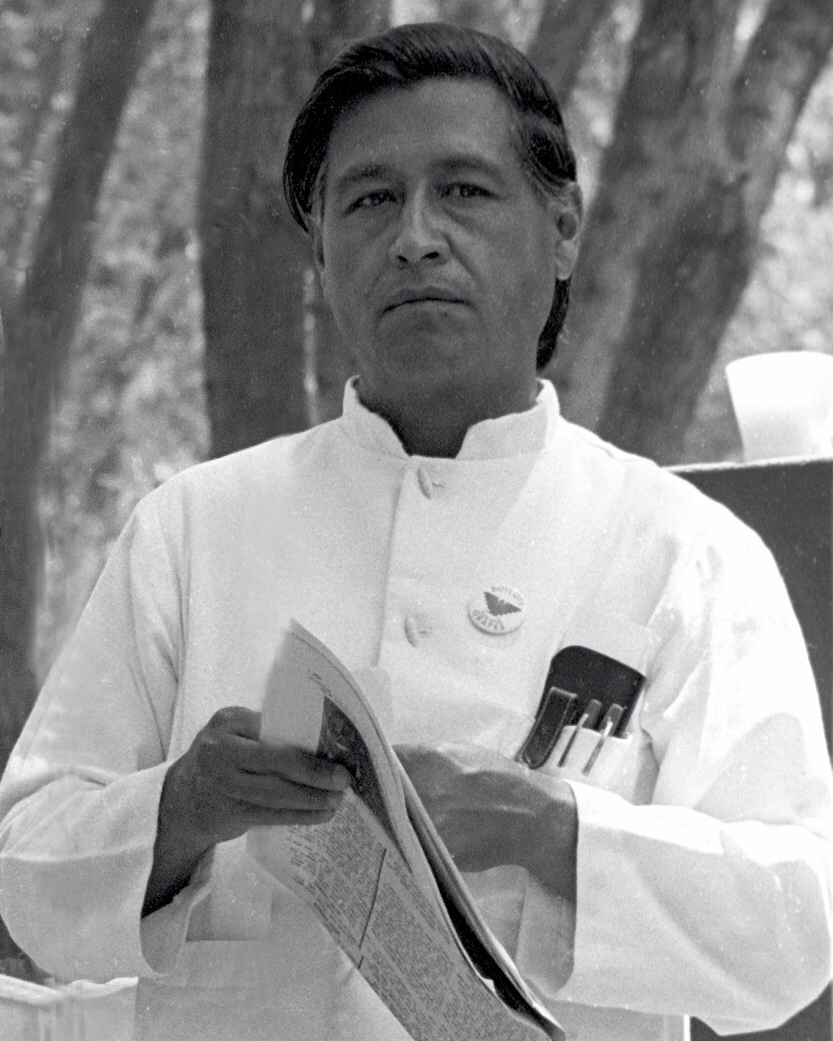
Cesar Chavez

- April 1 – Alan Kulwicki, U.S. race car driver (b. 1954)
- April 3
  - Peter J. De Muth, American politician (b. 1892)
  - Pinky Lee, American comedian (b. 1907)
- April 8 – Marian Anderson, American singer (b. 1897)
- April 13 – Wallace Stegner, American writer (b. 1909)
- April 19 – David Koresh, American spiritualist, leader of the Branch Davidian religious cult (b. 1959)
- April 23 – Cesar Chavez, Mexican American civil rights activist (b. 1927)
- April 26 – Julia Davis, American educator (b. 1891)
- April 28 – Jim Valvano, American basketball player (b. 1946)
- April 29 – Michael Gordon, American actor and director (b. 1909)

=== May ===
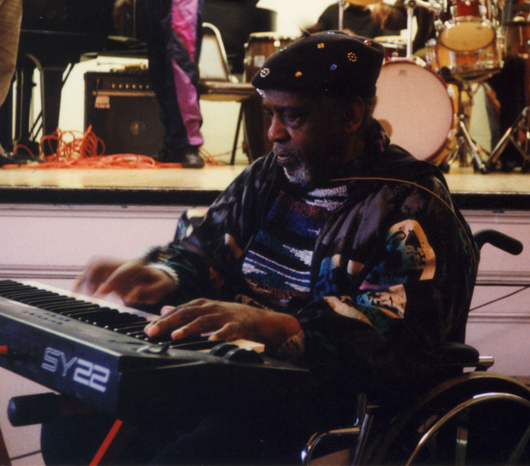
Sun Ra

- May 5 – Irving Howe, American literary and social critic (b. 1920)
- May 7 – Mary Philbin, American actress (b. 1902)
- May 8
  - Avram Davidson, American writer (b. 1923)
  - Alwin Nikolais, American choreographer (b. 1912)
- May 14 – William Randolph Hearst Jr., American businessman (b. 1908)
- May 26 – Catherine Caradja, Romanian aristocrat and philanthropist (b. 1893)
- May 30 – Sun Ra, American jazz musician (b. 1914)

=== June ===
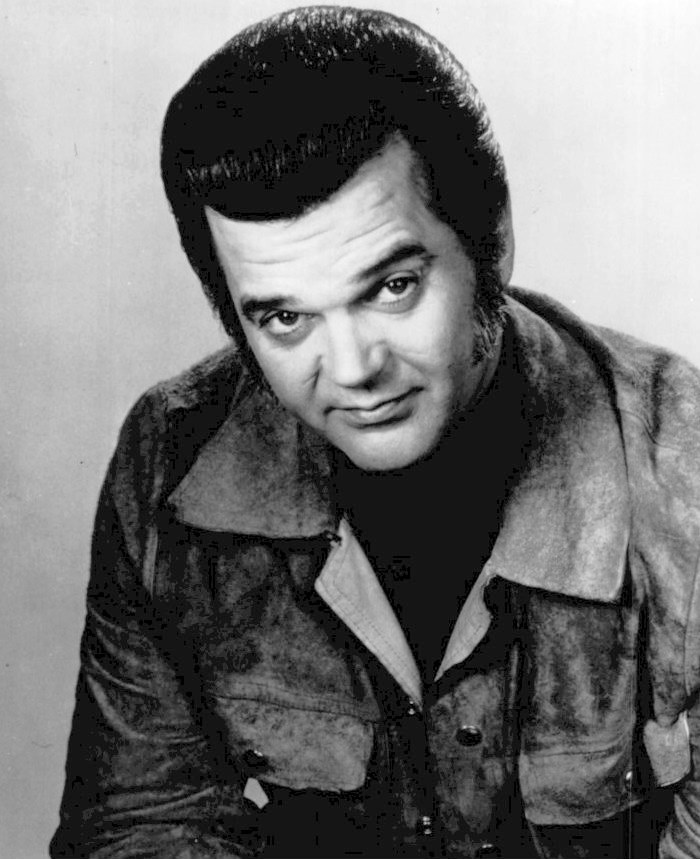
Conway Twitty

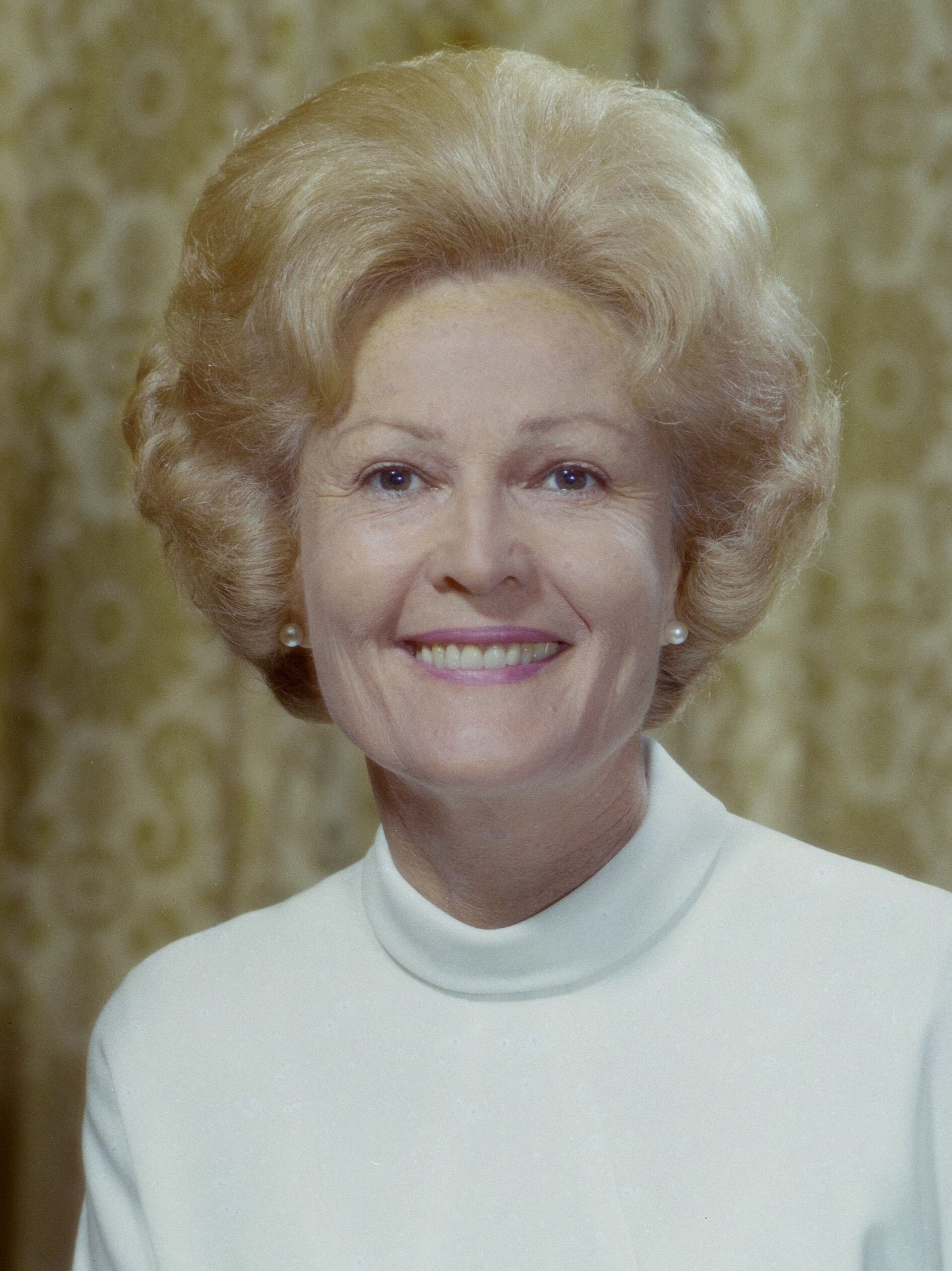
Pat Nixon

- June 2 – Johnny Mize, American baseball player (b. 1913)
- June 5 – Conway Twitty, American musician (b. 1933)
- June 6 – James Bridges, American screenwriter and director (b. 1936)
- June 8 – Nolan Bailey Harmon, bishop of The Methodist Church and the United Methodist Church (b. 1892)
- June 9 – Alexis Smith, Canadian-born American actress and singer (b. 1921)
- June 10
  - Arleen Auger, American soprano singer (b. 1939)
  - Milward L. Simpson, American politician (b. 1897)
- June 11 – Ray Sharkey, American actor (b. 1952)
- June 12 – Crawford Barton, American photographer (b. 1943)
- June 13 – Deke Slayton, American astronaut (b. 1924)
- June 15 – John Connally, American politician (b. 1917)
- June 19 – Szymon Goldberg, Polish-born violinist (b. 1909)
- June 22 – Pat Nixon, wife of Richard Nixon, First Lady of the United States, Second Lady of the United States (b. 1912)
- June 24 – Archie Williams, American Olympic athlete (b. 1915)
- June 26 – Roy Campanella, American baseball player (b. 1921)
- June 28 – GG Allin, American musician (b. 1956)
- June 29 – Héctor Lavoe, Puerto Rican singer (b. 1946)
- June 30 – Spanky McFarland, American actor (b. 1928)

=== July ===
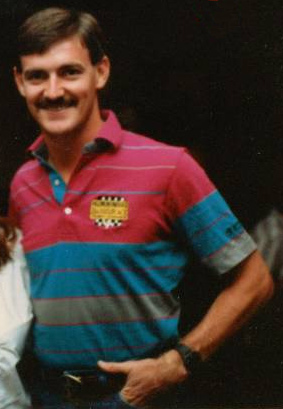
Davey Allison

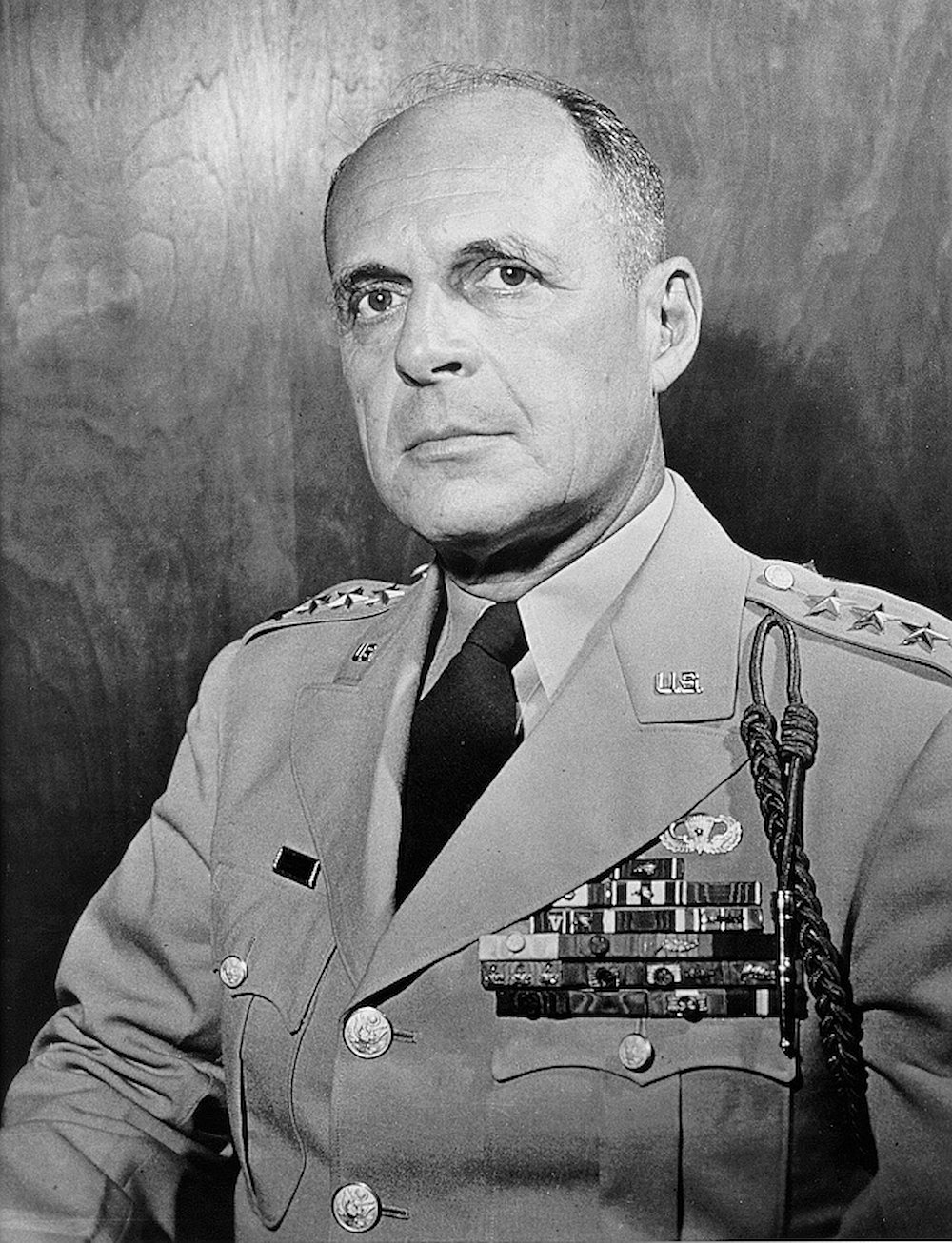
Matthew Ridgway

- July 2
  - Fred Gwynne, American actor and comedian (b. 1926)
  - Elizabeth M. Ramsey, American research physician (b. 1906)
- July 3
  - Don Drysdale, American baseball player (b. 1936)
  - Joe DeRita, American comedian (b. 1909)
- July 4 – Anne Shirley, American actress (b. 1918)
- July 7
  - Ben Chapman, baseball player and manager (b. 1908)
  - William McElwee Miller, American missionary to Persia and author (b. 1892)
  - Mia Zapata, American punk musician (b. 1965)
- July 12 – James Peck, American civil rights activist (b. 1914)
- July 13 – Davey Allison, American stock car driver (b. 1961)
- July 15
  - David Brian, American actor (b. 1914)
  - Mary Ann DeWeese, American sportswear designer (b.1913)
- July 20 – Vince Foster, attorney (b. 1945)
- July 24 – Abram L. Sachar, American historian and educator (b. 1899)
- July 25
  - Nan Grey, American actress (b. 1918)
  - Cecilia Parker, American actress (b. 1914)
- July 26 – Matthew Ridgway, American army general (b. 1895)
- July 27 – Reggie Lewis, American basketball player (b. 1965)
- July 30
  - William Guglielmo Niederland, German-born American psychoanalyst (b. 1904)
  - Don Myrick, American saxophonist (b. 1940)
  - Bob Wright, American baseball player (b. 1891)
- July 31 – Paul B. Henry, American politician (b. 1942)

=== August ===
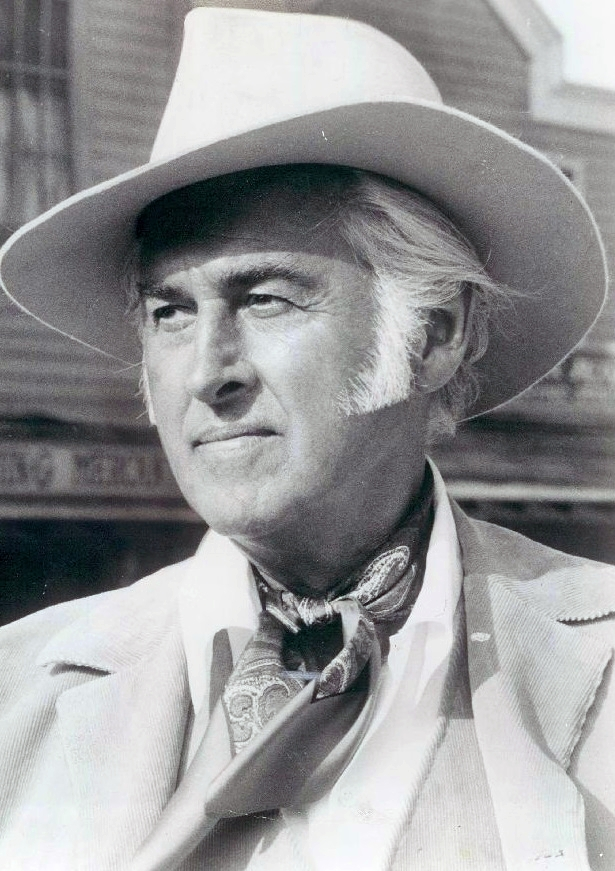
Stewart Granger

- August 1 – Claire Du Brey, American actress (b. 1892)
- August 3 – Theodore A. Parker III, American ornithologist (b. 1953)
- August 7 – Christopher Gillis, American dancer and choreographer (b. 1951)
- August 8 – Roy London, American actor (b. 1943)
- August 10 – Irene Sharaff, American costume designer (b. 1910)
- August 16 – Stewart Granger, Anglo-American actor (b. 1913)
- August 23 – Charles Scorsese, American actor (b. 1913)
- August 26 − Roy Raymond, American entrepreneur (b. 1947)
- August 29 – Dorian Corey, American drag performer and fashion designer (b. 1937)
- August 30 – Richard Jordan, American actor (b. 1937)

=== September ===
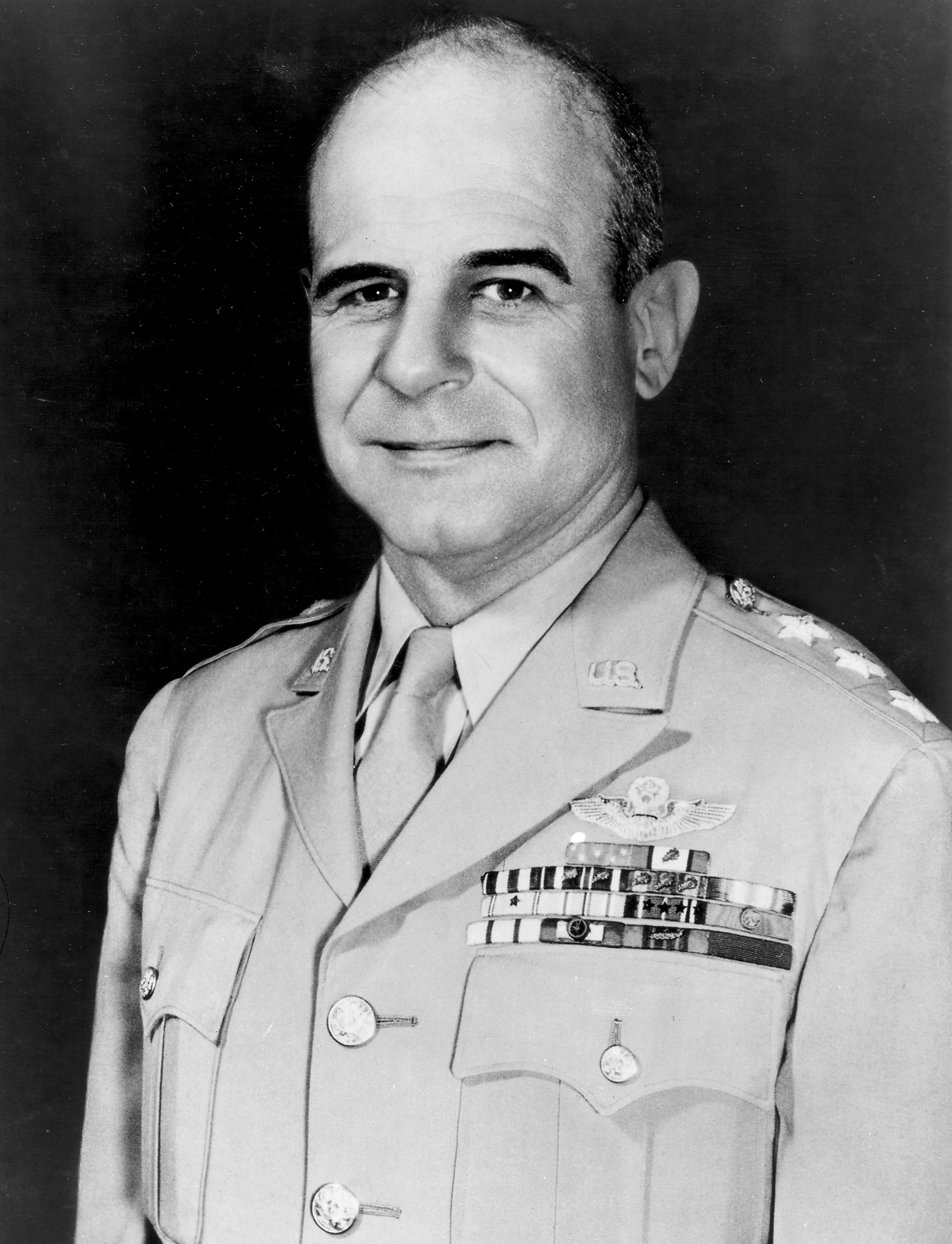
Jimmy Doolittle

- September 2 – Eric Berry, British actor (b. 1913)
- September 3 – Wesley Englehorn, American football player (b. 1890)
- September 4 – Hervé Villechaize, French-born actor (b. 1943)
- September 9 – Helen O'Connell, American singer (b. 1920)
- September 12
  - Raymond Burr, Canadian-American actor (b. 1917)
  - Charles Lamont, Russian-born film director (b. 1895)
- September 13 – Steve Jordan, American jazz guitarist (b. 1919)
- September 17 – Willie Mosconi, American pool player (b. 1913)
- September 22
  - Maurice Abravanel, Greek-born American conductor (b. 1903)
  - Regina Fryxell, American composer (b. 1899)
- September 27 – Jimmy Doolittle, American aviation pioneer and World War II United States Army Air Forces general (b. 1896)
- September 28 – Alexander A. Drabik, American soldier (b. 1910)
- September 29 – Gordon Douglas, American film director (b. 1907)

=== October ===
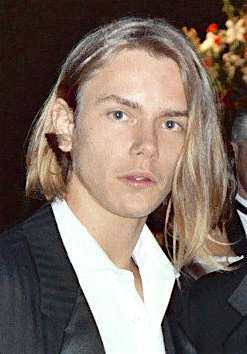
River Phoenix

- October 5 – Agnes de Mille, American dancer and choreographer (b. 1905)
- October 12 – Leon Ames, American actor (b. 1903)'
- October 13 – Ruth Gilbert, American actress (b. 1912)
- October 17 – Criss Oliva, American metal guitarist (b. 1963)
- October 21 – James Leo Herlihy, American novelist and playwright (b. 1927)
- October 25 – Vincent Price, American actor (b. 1911)
- October 26 – Harold Rome, American composer (b. 1908)
- October 31 – River Phoenix, American actor, musician and activist (b. 1970)

=== November ===
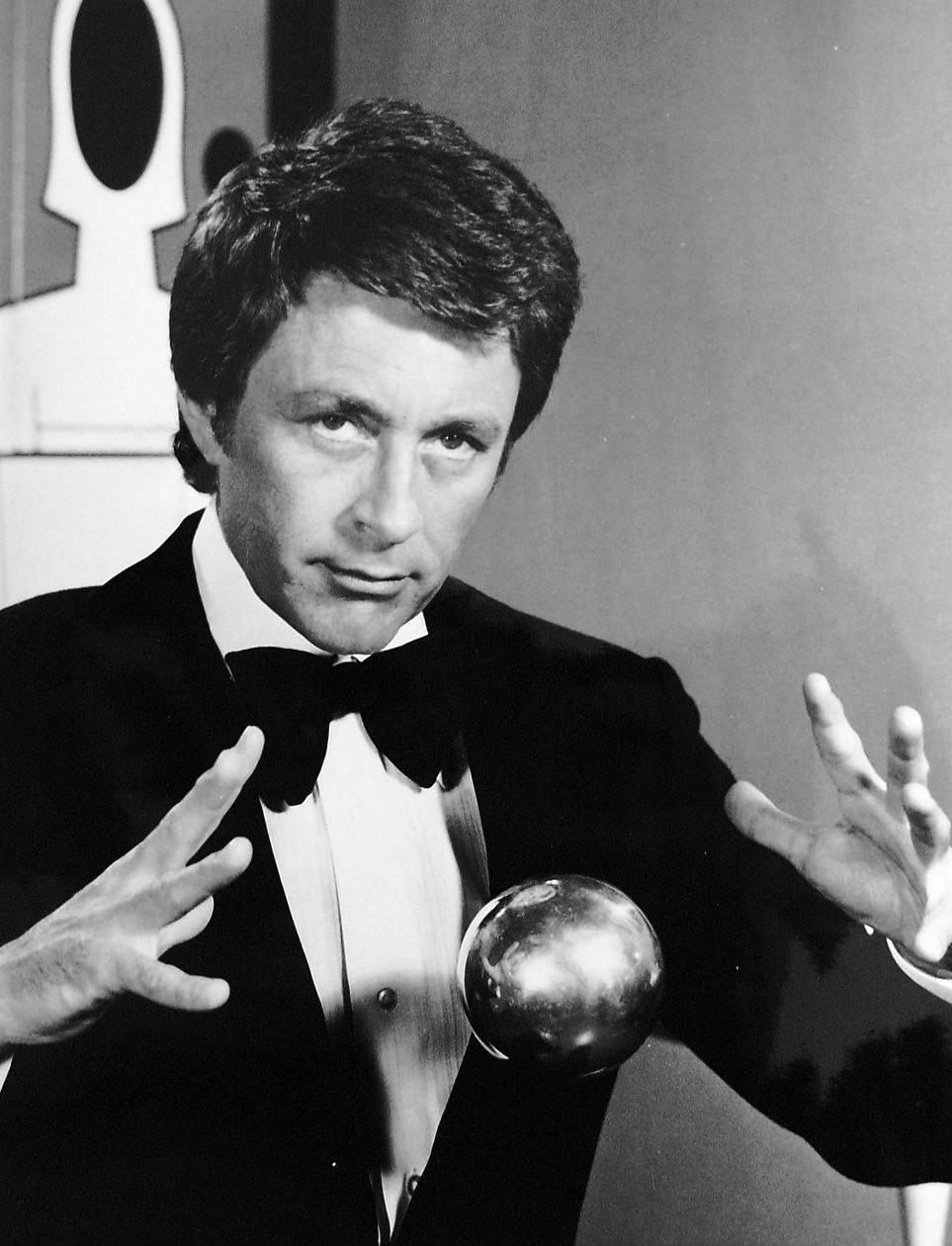
Bill Bixby

- November 1 – Severo Ochoa, Spanish-born biochemist, recipient of the Nobel Prize in Physiology or Medicine (b. 1905)
- November 6 – Ralph Randles Stewart, American botanist (b. 1890)
- November 12
  - Bill Dickey, American baseball player (b. 1907)
  - H. R. Haldeman, 4th White House Chief of Staff (b. 1926)
  - Anna Sten, Ukrainian-born American actress (b. 1908)
- November 13 – Rufus R. Jones, American wrestler (b. 1933)
- November 15 – Evelyn Venable, American actress (b. 1913)
- November 20 – Emile Ardolino, American film director (b. 1943)
- November 21 – Bill Bixby, American actor (b. 1934)
- November 24 – Albert Collins, African-American blues guitarist and singer (b. 1932)
- November 28
  - Jerry Edmonton, Canadian musician (b. 1946)
  - June Gittelson, American actress (b. 1910)
  - Garry Moore, American television host and comedian (b. 1915)

=== December ===
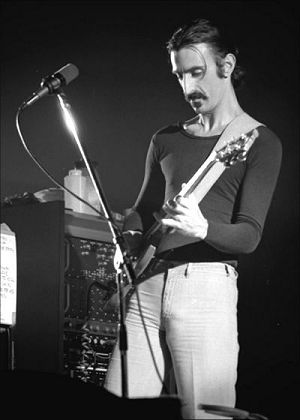
Frank Zappa

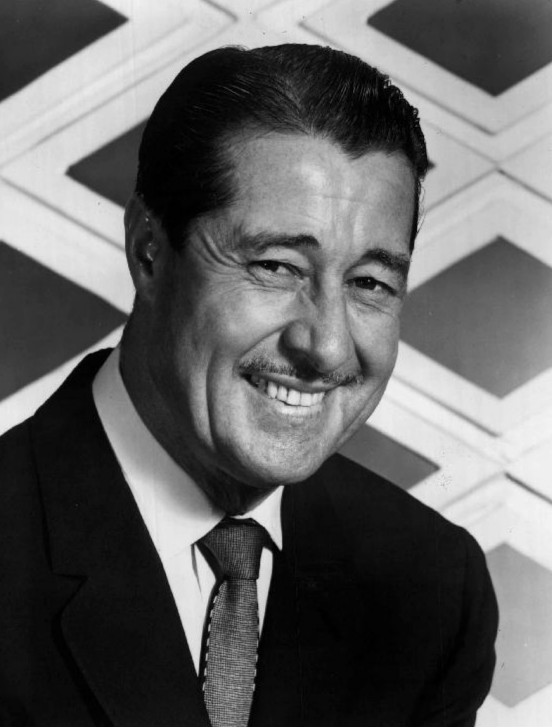
Don Ameche

- December 1 – Ray Gillen, American singer (b. 1959)
- December 3 – Lewis Thomas, physician and essayist (b. 1913)
- December 4 – Frank Zappa, American guitarist and composer (b. 1940)
- December 6 – Don Ameche, American actor (b. 1908)
- December 14 – Myrna Loy, American actress (b. 1905)
- December 16
  - Charles Willard Moore, American architect (b. 1926)
  - Charizma, American rapper and MC (b. 1973)
  - Moses Gunn, American actor (b. 1929)
- December 17 – Janet Margolin, American actress (b. 1943)
- December 18 – Sam Wanamaker, American film director and actor (b. 1919)
- December 19 – Michael Clarke, American musician (b. 1946)
- December 20 – W. Edwards Deming, American engineer, professor, author, lecturer, and management consultant (b. 1900)
- December 21 – Gussie Nell Davis, American educator and founder of the Kilgore College Rangerettes (b. 1906)
- December 22
  - Don DeFore, American actor (b. 1917)
  - Alexander Mackendrick, British-American film director (b. 1912)
- December 23 – James Ellison, American actor (b. 1910)
- December 24 – Norman Vincent Peale, American preacher and writer (b. 1898)
- December 27 – Michael Callen, American singer-songwriter, author, and activist (b. 1955)
- December 28
  - William L. Shirer, American journalist and historian (b. 1904)
  - Howard Caine, American actor (b. 1926)
- December 31
  - Brandon Teena, American murder victim (b. 1972)
  - Thomas Watson Jr., American businessman, political figure, and philanthropist (b. 1914)

== See also ==
- 1993 in American television
- List of American films of 1993
- Timeline of United States history (1990–2009)
