= 1931 St. Louis Browns season =

Major League Baseball season

1931 St. Louis Browns
- League: American League
- Ballpark: Sportsman's Park
- City: St. Louis, Missouri
- Record: 63–91 (.409)
- League place: 5th
- Owners: Phil Ball
- Managers: Bill Killefer
- Radio: KMOX (France Laux)

The 1931 St. Louis Browns season involved the team finishing fifth in the American League with a record of 63 wins and 91 losses.

== Regular season ==
=== Season standings ===
American League
| Team | W | L | Pct. | GB | Home | Road |
|---|---|---|---|---|---|---|
| Philadelphia Athletics | 107 | 45 | .704 | — | 60‍–‍15 | 47‍–‍30 |
| New York Yankees | 94 | 59 | .614 | 13½ | 51‍–‍25 | 43‍–‍34 |
| Washington Senators | 92 | 62 | .597 | 16 | 55‍–‍22 | 37‍–‍40 |
| Cleveland Indians | 78 | 76 | .506 | 30 | 45‍–‍31 | 33‍–‍45 |
| St. Louis Browns | 63 | 91 | .409 | 45 | 39‍–‍38 | 24‍–‍53 |
| Boston Red Sox | 62 | 90 | .408 | 45 | 39‍–‍40 | 23‍–‍50 |
| Detroit Tigers | 61 | 93 | .396 | 47 | 36‍–‍41 | 25‍–‍52 |
| Chicago White Sox | 56 | 97 | .366 | 51½ | 31‍–‍45 | 25‍–‍52 |

=== Record vs. opponents ===
1931 American League record Sources:
| Team | BOS | CWS | CLE | DET | NYY | PHA | SLB | WSH |
|---|---|---|---|---|---|---|---|---|
| Boston | — | 12–10–1 | 13–9 | 12–10 | 6–16 | 4–16 | 8–14 | 7–15 |
| Chicago | 10–12–1 | — | 7–15–1 | 11–11 | 6–15 | 3–19 | 12–10 | 7–15 |
| Cleveland | 9–13 | 15–7–1 | — | 13–9 | 13–9 | 4–18 | 16–6 | 8–14 |
| Detroit | 10–12 | 11–11 | 9–13 | — | 8–14 | 4–18 | 11–11 | 8–14 |
| New York | 16–6 | 15–6 | 9–13 | 14–8 | — | 11–11 | 16–6 | 13–9–1 |
| Philadelphia | 16–4 | 19–3 | 18–4 | 18–4 | 11–11 | — | 14–8 | 11–11–1 |
| St. Louis | 14–8 | 10–12 | 6–16 | 11–11 | 6–16 | 8–14 | — | 8–14 |
| Washington | 15–7 | 15–7 | 14–8 | 14–8 | 9–13–1 | 11–11–1 | 14–8 | — |

=== Roster ===
1931 St. Louis Browns
Roster
| Pitchers: 12 George Blaeholder; 25 Garland Braxton; 16 Dick Coffman; 18 Rip Collins; 20 Bob Cooney; 20 Jess Doyle; 15 Sam Gray; 27 Wally Hebert; 17 Chad Kimsey; 14 Lefty Stewart; 20 Fred Stiely; 19 Rollie Stiles | Catchers: 10 Benny Bengough; 10 Jack Crouch; 8 Rick Ferrell; 9 Russ Young; Infielders: 2 Jack Burns; 24 Ed Grimes; 4 Red Kress; 1 Jim Levey; 5 Ski Melillo; 21 Frank O'Rourke; 7 Lin Storti | Outfielders: 23 Larry Bettencourt; 3 Goose Goslin; 26 Tom Jenkins; -- Nap Kloza; 22 Earl McNeely; 6 Fred Schulte; 21 Buck Stanton; 25 Frank Waddey | Manager: 33 Bill Killefer; Coaches: 28 Jimmy Austin; 22 Earl McNeely |

== Player stats ==
=== Batting ===
==== Starters by position ====
Note: Pos = Position; G = Games played; AB = At bats; H = Hits; Avg. = Batting average; HR = Home runs; RBI = Runs batted in

| Pos | Player | G | AB | H | Avg. | HR | RBI |
|---|---|---|---|---|---|---|---|
| C | Rick Ferrell | 117 | 386 | 118 | .306 | 3 | 57 |
| 1B | Jack Burns | 144 | 580 | 148 | .255 | 4 | 70 |
| 2B | Ski Melillo | 151 | 617 | 189 | .306 | 2 | 75 |
| SS | Jim Levey | 139 | 498 | 104 | .209 | 5 | 38 |
| 3B | Red Kress | 150 | 605 | 188 | .311 | 16 | 114 |
| OF | Larry Bettencourt | 74 | 206 | 53 | .257 | 3 | 26 |
| OF | Fred Schulte | 134 | 553 | 168 | .304 | 9 | 65 |
| OF | Goose Goslin | 151 | 591 | 194 | .328 | 24 | 105 |

==== Other batters ====
Note: G = Games played; AB = At bats; H = Hits; Avg. = Batting average; HR = Home runs; RBI = Runs batted in

| Player | G | AB | H | Avg. | HR | RBI |
|---|---|---|---|---|---|---|
| Lin Storti | 86 | 273 | 60 | .220 | 3 | 26 |
| Tom Jenkins | 81 | 230 | 61 | .265 | 3 | 25 |
| Benny Bengough | 40 | 140 | 35 | .250 | 0 | 12 |
| Earl McNeely | 49 | 102 | 23 | .225 | 0 | 15 |
| Ed Grimes | 43 | 57 | 15 | .263 | 0 | 5 |
| Russ Young | 16 | 34 | 4 | .118 | 1 | 2 |
| Frank Waddey | 14 | 22 | 6 | .273 | 0 | 2 |
| Buck Stanton | 13 | 15 | 3 | .200 | 0 | 0 |
| Jack Crouch | 8 | 12 | 0 | .000 | 0 | 1 |
| Frank O'Rourke | 8 | 9 | 2 | .222 | 0 | 0 |
| Nap Kloza | 3 | 7 | 1 | .143 | 0 | 0 |

=== Pitching ===
==== Starting pitchers ====
Note: G = Games pitched; IP = Innings pitched; W = Wins; L = Losses; ERA = Earned run average; SO = Strikeouts

| Player | G | IP | W | L | ERA | SO |
|---|---|---|---|---|---|---|
| Sam Gray | 43 | 258.0 | 11 | 24 | 5.09 | 88 |
| Lefty Stewart | 36 | 258.0 | 14 | 17 | 4.40 | 89 |
| George Blaeholder | 35 | 226.1 | 11 | 15 | 4.53 | 79 |
| Rip Collins | 17 | 107.0 | 5 | 5 | 3.79 | 34 |
| Bob Cooney | 5 | 39.1 | 0 | 3 | 4.12 | 13 |

==== Other pitchers ====
Note: G = Games pitched; IP = Innings pitched; W = Wins; L = Losses; ERA = Earned run average; SO = Strikeouts

| Player | G | IP | W | L | ERA | SO |
|---|---|---|---|---|---|---|
| Dick Coffman | 32 | 169.1 | 9 | 13 | 3.88 | 39 |
| Wally Hebert | 23 | 103.0 | 6 | 7 | 5.07 | 26 |

==== Relief pitchers ====
Note: G = Games pitched; W = Wins; L = Losses; SV = Saves; ERA = Earned run average; SO = Strikeouts

| Player | G | W | L | SV | ERA | SO |
|---|---|---|---|---|---|---|
| Chad Kimsey | 42 | 4 | 6 | 7 | 4.39 | 27 |
| Rollie Stiles | 34 | 3 | 1 | 0 | 7.22 | 32 |
| Garland Braxton | 11 | 0 | 0 | 0 | 10.50 | 7 |
| Fred Stiely | 4 | 0 | 0 | 0 | 6.75 | 2 |
| Jess Doyle | 1 | 0 | 0 | 0 | 27.00 | 0 |
