= 1930 St. Louis Browns season =

Major League Baseball season

1930 St. Louis Browns
- League: American League
- Ballpark: Sportsman's Park
- City: St. Louis, Missouri
- Record: 64–90 (.416)
- League place: 6th
- Owners: Phil Ball
- Managers: Bill Killefer
- Radio: KMOX (France Laux)

The 1930 St. Louis Browns season involved the Browns finishing 6th in the American League with a record of 64 wins and 90 losses.

== Regular season ==
=== Season standings ===
American League
Team	W	L	Pct.	GB	Home	Road
Philadelphia Athletics	102	52	.662	—	58‍–‍18	44‍–‍34
Washington Senators	94	60	.610	8	56‍–‍21	38‍–‍39
New York Yankees	86	68	.558	16	47‍–‍29	39‍–‍39
Cleveland Indians	81	73	.526	21	44‍–‍33	37‍–‍40
Detroit Tigers	75	79	.487	27	45‍–‍33	30‍–‍46
St. Louis Browns	64	90	.416	38	38‍–‍40	26‍–‍50
Chicago White Sox	62	92	.403	40	34‍–‍44	28‍–‍48
Boston Red Sox	52	102	.338	50	30‍–‍46	22‍–‍56

=== Record vs. opponents ===
1930 American League record Sources:
Team	BOS	CWS	CLE	DET	NYY	PHA	SLB	WSH
Boston	—	13–9	7–15	8–14	6–16	4–18	9–13	5–17
Chicago	9–13	—	10–12	9–13	8–14	6–16	12–10	8–14
Cleveland	15–7	12–10	—	11–11	10–12	7–15	16–6	10–12
Detroit	14–8	13–9	11–11	—	9–13	7–15	11–11	10–12
New York	16–6	14–8	12–10	13–9	—	10–12	16–6	5–17
Philadelphia	18–4	16–6	15–7	15–7	12–10	—	16–6	10–12
St. Louis	13–9	10–12	6–16	11–11	6–16	6–16	—	12–10
Washington	17–5	14–8	12–10	12–10	17–5	12–10	10–12	—

=== Roster ===
1930 St. Louis Browns
Roster
Pitchers: George Blaeholder; Dick Coffman; Rip Collins; Alvin Crowder; Sam Gray; Herm Holshouser; Chad Kimsey; Lefty Stewart; Fred Stiely; Rollie Stiles	Catchers: Jack Crouch; Rick Ferrell; Bernie Hungling; Clyde Manion; Infielders: Lu Blue; Jack Burns; Sammy Hale; Joe Hassler; Red Kress; Jim Levey; Ski Melillo; Frank O'Rourke; Lin Storti	Outfielders: Red Badgro; Goose Goslin; Ted Gullic; Tom Jenkins; Heinie Manush; Earl McNeely; Alex Metzler; Fred Schulte	Manager: Bill Killefer; Coaches: Jimmy Austin; Lena Blackburne

== Player stats ==
=== Batting ===
==== Starters by position ====
Note: Pos = Position; G = Games played; AB = At bats; H = Hits; Avg. = Batting average; HR = Home runs; RBI = Runs batted in

Pos	Player	G	AB	H	Avg.	HR	RBI
C	Rick Ferrell	101	314	84	.268	1	41
1B	Lu Blue	117	425	100	.235	4	42
2B	Ski Melillo	149	574	147	.256	5	59
SS	Red Kress	154	614	192	.313	16	112
3B	Frank O'Rourke	115	400	107	.268	1	41
OF	Ted Gullic	92	308	77	.250	4	44
OF	Fred Schulte	113	392	109	.278	5	62
OF	Goose Goslin	101	396	129	.326	30	100

==== Other batters ====
Note: G = Games played; AB = At bats; H = Hits; Avg. = Batting average; HR = Home runs; RBI = Runs batted in

Player	G	AB	H	Avg.	HR	RBI
Earl McNeely	76	235	64	.272	0	20
Red Badgro	89	234	56	.239	1	27
Alex Metzler	56	209	54	.258	1	23
Heinie Manush	49	198	65	.328	2	29
Sammy Hale	62	190	52	.274	2	25
Clyde Manion	57	148	32	.216	1	11
Jim Levey	8	37	9	.243	0	3
Bernie Hungling	10	31	10	.323	0	2
Jack Burns	8	30	9	.300	0	2
Lin Storti	7	28	9	.321	0	2
Jack Crouch	6	14	2	.143	0	1
Joe Hassler	5	8	2	.250	0	1
Tom Jenkins	2	8	2	.250	0	3

=== Pitching ===
==== Starting pitchers ====
Note: G = Games pitched; IP = Innings pitched; W = Wins; L = Losses; ERA = Earned run average; SO = Strikeouts

Player	G	IP	W	L	ERA	SO
Lefty Stewart	35	271.0	20	12	3.45	79
Dick Coffman	38	196.0	8	18	5.14	54
Sam Gray	27	167.2	4	15	6.28	51
Alvin Crowder	13	77.1	3	7	4.66	42

==== Other pitchers ====
Note: G = Games pitched; IP = Innings pitched; W = Wins; L = Losses; ERA = Earned run average; SO = Strikeouts

Player	G	IP	W	L	ERA	SO
George Blaeholder	37	191.1	11	13	4.61	70
Rip Collins	35	171.2	9	7	4.35	75
Rollie Stiles	20	102.0	3	6	5.91	25
Fred Stiely	4	19.0	0	1	8.53	5

==== Relief pitchers ====
Note: G = Games pitched; W = Wins; L = Losses; SV = Saves; ERA = Earned run average; SO = Strikeouts

Player	G	W	L	SV	ERA	SO
Chad Kimsey	42	6	10	1	6.35	32
Herm Holshouser	25	0	1	1	7.80	37
