= 1932 St. Louis Browns season =

Major League Baseball season

1932 St. Louis Browns
- League: American League
- Ballpark: Sportsman's Park
- City: St. Louis, Missouri
- Record: 63–91 (.409)
- League place: 6th
- Owners: Phil Ball
- Managers: Bill Killefer
- Radio: KMOX (France Laux)

The 1932 St. Louis Browns season involved the Browns finishing 6th in the American League with a record of 63 wins and 91 losses.

== Regular season ==
=== Season standings ===
American League
Team	W	L	Pct.	GB	Home	Road
New York Yankees	107	47	.695	—	62‍–‍15	45‍–‍32
Philadelphia Athletics	94	60	.610	13	51‍–‍26	43‍–‍34
Washington Senators	93	61	.604	14	51‍–‍26	42‍–‍35
Cleveland Indians	87	65	.572	19	43‍–‍33	44‍–‍32
Detroit Tigers	76	75	.503	29½	42‍–‍34	34‍–‍41
St. Louis Browns	63	91	.409	44	33‍–‍42	30‍–‍49
Chicago White Sox	49	102	.325	56½	28‍–‍49	21‍–‍53
Boston Red Sox	43	111	.279	64	27‍–‍50	16‍–‍61

=== Record vs. opponents ===
1932 American League record Sources:
Team	BOS	CWS	CLE	DET	NYY	PHA	SLB	WSH
Boston	—	12–10	4–18	6–16	5–17	4–18	7–15	5–17
Chicago	10–12	—	7–14–1	8–12	5–17	7–15	8–14	4–18
Cleveland	18–4	14–7–1	—	11–10	7–15	10–12	16–6	11–11
Detroit	16–6	12–8	10–11	—	5–17–2	7–15	15–7	11–11
New York	17–5	17–5	15–7	17–5–2	—	14–8	16–6	11–11
Philadelphia	18–4	15–7	12–10	15–7	8–14	—	16–6	10–12
St. Louis	15–7	14–8	6–16	7–15	6–16	6–16	—	9–13
Washington	17–5	18–4	11–11	11–11	11–11	12–10	13–9	—

=== Notable transactions ===
- April 27, 1932: Red Kress was traded by the Browns to the Chicago White Sox for Bruce Campbell and Bump Hadley.
- September 9, 1932: Chad Kimsey was purchased from the Browns by the Chicago White Sox.

=== Roster ===
1932 St. Louis Browns
Roster
Pitchers: 12 George Blaeholder; 16 Dick Coffman; 20 Bob Cooney; 16 Carl Fischer; 15 Sam Gray; 9 Bump Hadley; 19 Wally Hebert; 17 Chad Kimsey; 21 Lou Polli; 14 Lefty Stewart	Catchers: 10 Benny Bengough; 8 Rick Ferrell; 18 Johnny Schulte; Infielders: 2 Jack Burns; 24 Ed Grimes; -- Red Kress; 1 Jim Levey; -- Jim McLaughlin; 5 Ski Melillo; -- Art Scharein; 7 Lin Storti	Outfielders: 23 Larry Bettencourt; 4 Bruce Campbell; -- Showboat Fisher; -- Debs Garms; 3 Goose Goslin; 26 Tom Jenkins; 25 Nap Kloza; 6 Fred Schulte	Manager: 33 Bill Killefer; Coaches: 28 Jimmy Austin; 29 Allen Sothoron

== Player stats ==
=== Batting ===
==== Starters by position ====
Note: Pos = Position; G = Games played; AB = At bats; H = Hits; Avg. = Batting average; HR = Home runs; RBI = Runs batted in

Pos	Player	G	AB	H	Avg.	HR	RBI
C	Rick Ferrell	126	438	138	.315	2	65
1B	Jack Burns	150	617	188	.305	11	70
2B	Ski Melillo	154	612	148	.242	3	66
SS	Jim Levey	152	568	159	.280	4	63
3B	Art Scharein	81	303	92	.304	0	42
OF	Fred Schulte	146	565	166	.294	9	73
OF	Goose Goslin	150	572	171	.299	17	104
OF	Bruce Campbell	139	593	169	.285	14	85

==== Other batters ====
Note: G = Games played; AB = At bats; H = Hits; Avg. = Batting average; HR = Home runs; RBI = Runs batted in

Player	G	AB	H	Avg.	HR	RBI
Lin Storti	53	193	50	.259	3	26
Benny Bengough	54	139	35	.252	0	15
Debs Garms	34	134	38	.284	1	8
Ed Grimes	31	68	16	.235	0	13
Tom Jenkins	25	62	20	.323	0	5
Red Kress	14	52	9	.173	2	9
Larry Bettencourt	27	30	4	.133	1	3
Johnny Schulte	15	24	5	.208	0	3
Showboat Fisher	18	22	4	.182	0	2
Nap Kloza	19	13	2	.154	0	2
Jim McLaughlin	1	1	0	.000	0	1

=== Pitching ===
==== Starting pitchers ====
Note: G = Games pitched; IP = Innings pitched; W = Wins; L = Losses; ERA = Earned run average; SO = Strikeouts

Player	G	IP	W	L	ERA	SO
Lefty Stewart	41	259.2	15	19	4.61	86
George Blaeholder	42	258.1	14	14	4.70	80
Bump Hadley	40	229.2	13	20	5.53	132

==== Other pitchers ====
Note: G = Games pitched; IP = Innings pitched; W = Wins; L = Losses; ERA = Earned run average; SO = Strikeouts

Player	G	IP	W	L	ERA	SO
Sam Gray	52	206.2	7	12	4.53	79
Wally Hebert	35	108.1	1	12	6.48	29
Carl Fischer	24	97.0	3	7	5.57	35
Dick Coffman	9	61.0	5	3	3.10	14

==== Relief pitchers ====
Note: G = Games pitched; W = Wins; L = Losses; SV = Saves; ERA = Earned run average; SO = Strikeouts

Player	G	W	L	SV	ERA	SO
Chad Kimsey	33	4	2	3	4.02	13
Bob Cooney	23	1	2	1	6.97	23
Lou Polli	5	0	0	0	5.40	5

== Farm system ==
Level	Team	League	Manager
A	Wichita Falls Spudders/Longview Cannibals	Texas League	Hank Severeid
C	Fort Smith Twins/Muskogee Chiefs	Western Association	Jerry Mallett and Runt Marr
D	Rock Island Islanders	Mississippi Valley League	George Young and Riley Parker

LEAGUE CHAMPIONS: Rock Island
Wichita Falls transferred to Longview and renamed, May 20; Fort Smith franchise transferred to Muskogee and renamed, July 1, 1932
