= 1929 St. Louis Browns season =

Major League Baseball season

1929 St. Louis Browns
- League: American League
- Ballpark: Sportsman's Park
- City: St. Louis, Missouri
- Record: 79–73 (.520)
- League place: 4th
- Owners: Phil Ball
- Managers: Dan Howley
- Radio: KMOX (France Laux)

The 1929 St. Louis Browns season involved the Browns finishing 4th in the American League with a record of 79 wins and 73 losses. This would be the last time the franchise would finish above .500 in a peacetime season until 1960, when they were the Baltimore Orioles.

== Regular season ==
=== Season standings ===
American League
Team	W	L	Pct.	GB	Home	Road
Philadelphia Athletics	104	46	.693	—	57‍–‍16	47‍–‍30
New York Yankees	88	66	.571	18	49‍–‍28	39‍–‍38
Cleveland Indians	81	71	.533	24	44‍–‍32	37‍–‍39
St. Louis Browns	79	73	.520	26	41‍–‍36	38‍–‍37
Washington Senators	71	81	.467	34	37‍–‍40	34‍–‍41
Detroit Tigers	70	84	.455	36	38‍–‍39	32‍–‍45
Chicago White Sox	59	93	.388	46	35‍–‍41	24‍–‍52
Boston Red Sox	58	96	.377	48	32‍–‍45	26‍–‍51

=== Record vs. opponents ===
1929 American League record Sources:
Team	BOS	CWS	CLE	DET	NYY	PHA	SLB	WSH
Boston	—	11–11	9–13	8–14	5–17	4–18	11–11–1	10–12
Chicago	11–11	—	9–12	10–12	6–16	9–13	4–17	10–12
Cleveland	13–9	12–9	—	11–11	14–8	7–14	10–12	14–8
Detroit	14–8	12–10	11–11	—	9–13	4–18	10–12	10–12–1
New York	17–5	16–6	8–14	13–9	—	8–14	14–8	12–10
Philadelphia	18–4	13–9	14–7	18–4	14–8	—	11–10–1	16–4
St. Louis	11–11–1	17–4	12–10	12–10	8–14	10–11–1	—	9–13
Washington	12–10	12–10	8–14	12–10–1	10–12	4–16	13–9	—

=== Roster ===
1929 St. Louis Browns
Roster
Pitchers: George Blaeholder; Herb Cobb; Dick Coffman; Rip Collins; Alvin Crowder; Oscar Estrada; Sam Gray; Paul Hopkins; Chad Kimsey; Jack Ogden; Lefty Stewart; Fred Stiely; Ed Strelecki	Catchers: Rick Ferrell; Clyde Manion; Wally Schang; Infielders: Jimmy Austin; Lu Blue; Otis Brannan; Len Dondero; Red Kress; Ski Melillo; Frank O'Rourke; Ed Roetz	Outfielders: Red Badgro; Tom Jenkins; Heinie Manush; Beauty McGowan; Earl McNeely; Fred Schulte	Manager: Dan Howley

== Player stats ==
=== Batting ===
==== Starters by position ====
Note: Pos = Position; G = Games played; AB = At bats; H = Hits; Avg. = Batting average; HR = Home runs; RBI = Runs batted in

Pos	Player	G	AB	H	Avg.	HR	RBI
C	Wally Schang	94	249	59	.237	5	36
1B	Lu Blue	151	573	168	.293	6	61
2B	Ski Melillo	141	494	146	.296	5	67
SS	Red Kress	147	557	170	.305	9	107
3B	Frank O'Rourke	154	585	147	.251	2	62
OF	Fred Schulte	121	446	137	.307	3	71
OF	Beauty McGowan	125	441	112	.254	2	51
OF	Heinie Manush	142	574	204	.355	6	81

==== Other batters ====
Note: G = Games played; AB = At bats; H = Hits; Avg. = Batting average; HR = Home runs; RBI = Runs batted in

Player	G	AB	H	Avg.	HR	RBI
Earl McNeely	69	230	56	.243	1	18
Red Badgro	54	148	42	.284	1	18
Rick Ferrell	64	144	33	.229	0	20
Clyde Manion	35	111	27	.243	0	11
Otis Brannan	23	51	15	.294	1	8
Ed Roetz	16	45	11	.244	0	5
Len Dondero	19	31	6	.194	1	8
Tom Jenkins	21	22	4	.182	0	0
Jimmy Austin	1	1	0	.000	0	0

=== Pitching ===
= Indicates league leader

==== Starting pitchers ====
Note: G = Games pitched; IP = Innings pitched; W = Wins; L = Losses; ERA = Earned run average; SO = Strikeouts

Player	G	IP	W	L	ERA	SO
Sam Gray	43	305.0	18	15	3.72	109
General Crowder	40	266.2	17	15	3.92	79
Rip Collins	26	155.1	11	6	4.00	47
Lefty Stewart	23	149.2	9	6	3.25	47
Fred Stiely	1	9.0	1	0	0.00	2

==== Other pitchers ====
Note: G = Games pitched; IP = Innings pitched; W = Wins; L = Losses; ERA = Earned run average; SO = Strikeouts

Player	G	IP	W	L	ERA	SO
George Blaeholder	42	222.0	14	15	4.82	72
Jack Ogden	34	131.1	4	8	4.93	32

==== Relief pitchers ====
Note: G = Games pitched; W = Wins; L = Losses; SV = Saves; ERA = Earned run average; SO = Strikeouts

Player	G	W	L	SV	ERA	SO
Dick Coffman	27	1	1	1	5.98	11
Chad Kimsey	24	3	6	1	5.04	13
Ed Strelecki	7	1	1	0	4.91	2
Paul Hopkins	2	0	0	0	0.00	1
Oscar Estrada	1	0	0	0	0.00	0
Herb Cobb	1	0	0	0	36.00	0
