= List of Baltimore Orioles seasons =

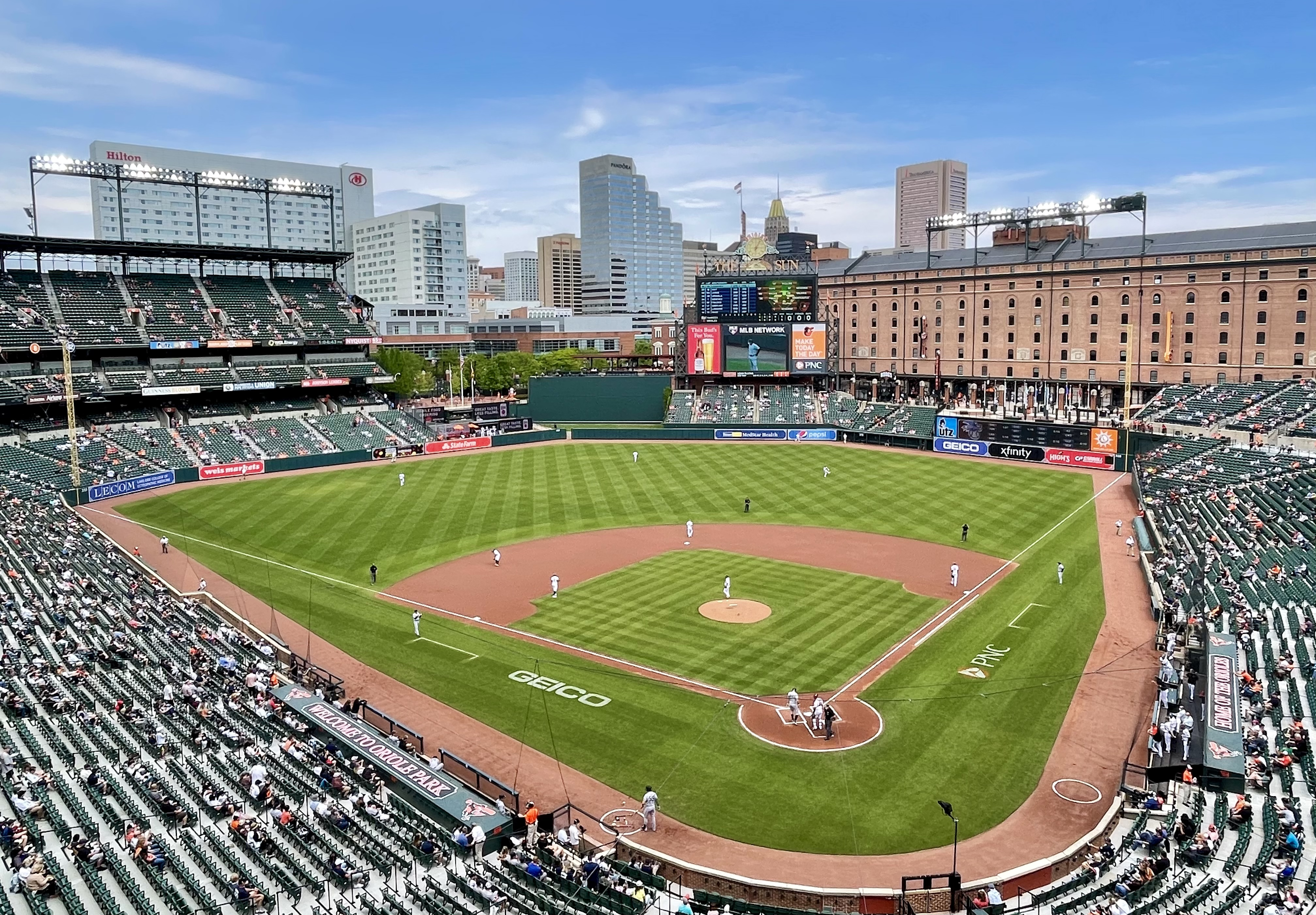
Oriole Park at Camden Yards, home field of the Orioles since the 1992 season.

The Baltimore Orioles, formerly the St. Louis Browns, are an American professional baseball franchise currently based in Baltimore, Maryland. They were founded in 1894 as the Milwaukee Brewers of the Western League and joined the American League (AL) in 1901, before relocating to St. Louis the following season – a move planned by the league several years before its fruition.

The Browns generally struggled in their early years as a Major League team, never finishing higher than fourth before 1921, and in fact having only eight winning seasons before World War II. They lost over 100 games five times, and in 1939 set an unenviable MLB record for the highest earned run average against a team on record at just over 6.00 per nine innings. They did not play in a World Series until 1944 – when most other teams were decimated by the war – and had no winning seasons between 1946 and their sixth season in Baltimore as the "Orioles" in 1959. Starting in 1960, the Orioles became contenders, finishing in second place in 1960 and third place in 1961, 1964 and 1965.

After this, however, the Orioles entered their golden age between 1966 and 1983, when they won three World Series, played in the postseason eight times, and had eighteen consecutive winning seasons between 1968 and 1985. The period from 1986 to 2011, however, was another era of failure apart from a short period in the middle 1990s. The Orioles played in the postseason only twice over twenty-eight seasons and suffered fourteen successive losing seasons between 1998 and 2011, before in 2012 surprisingly winning 93 games and their first playoff series since 1997. The team most recently made the playoffs in 2024.

These statistics are from Baseball-Reference.com's Baltimore Orioles History & Encyclopedia, and are current as of the end of the 2026 MLB regular season.

== Year by year ==
World Series champions †	American League champions *	Division champions^	Wild Card berth ¤

Season	Level	League	Division	Finish	Won	Lost	Win%	GB	Playoffs	Awards
Milwaukee Brewers
1901	MLB	AL		8th	48	89	.350	35½		
St. Louis Browns
1902	MLB	AL		2nd	78	58	.573	5		
1903	MLB	AL		6th	65	74	.467	26½		
1904	MLB	AL		6th	65	87	.427	29		
1905	MLB	AL		8th	54	99	.352	40½		
1906	MLB	AL		5th	76	73	.510	16		
1907	MLB	AL		6th	69	83	.453	24		
1908	MLB	AL		4th	83	69	.546	6½		
1909	MLB	AL		7th	61	89	.406	36		
1910	MLB	AL		8th	47	107	.305	57		
1911	MLB	AL		8th	45	107	.296	56½		
1912	MLB	AL		7th	53	101	.344	53		
1913	MLB	AL		8th	57	96	.372	39		
1914	MLB	AL		5th	71	82	.464	28½		
1915	MLB	AL		6th	63	91	.409	39½		
1916	MLB	AL		5th	79	75	.512	12		
1917	MLB	AL		7th	57	97	.370	43		
1918	MLB	AL		5th	58	64	.475	15		
1919	MLB	AL		5th	67	72	.482	20½		
1920	MLB	AL		4th	76	77	.496	21½		
1921	MLB	AL		3rd	81	73	.525	17½		
1922	MLB	AL		2nd	93	61	.604	1		
1923	MLB	AL		5th	74	78	.486	24		
1924	MLB	AL		4th	74	78	.486	17		
1925	MLB	AL		3rd	82	71	.535	15		
1926	MLB	AL		7th	62	92	.402	29		
1927	MLB	AL		7th	59	94	.385	50½		
1928	MLB	AL		3rd	82	72	.532	19		
1929	MLB	AL		4th	79	73	.519	26		
1930	MLB	AL		6th	64	90	.415	38		
1931	MLB	AL		5th	63	91	.409	45		
1932	MLB	AL		6th	63	91	.409	44		
1933	MLB	AL		8th	55	96	.364	43½		
1934	MLB	AL		6th	67	85	.440	33		
1935	MLB	AL		7th	65	87	.427	28½		
1936	MLB	AL		7th	57	95	.375	44½		
1937	MLB	AL		8th	46	108	.298	56		
1938	MLB	AL		7th	55	97	.361	44		
1939	MLB	AL		8th	43	111	.279	64½		
1940	MLB	AL		6th	67	87	.435	23		
1941	MLB	AL		7th	70	84	.454	31		
1942	MLB	AL		3rd	82	69	.543	19½		
1943	MLB	AL		6th	72	80	.473	25		
1944	MLB	AL *		1st	89	65	.578	—	Lost World Series (Cardinals) 4–2 *	
1945	MLB	AL		3rd	81	70	.536	6		
1946	MLB	AL		7th	66	88	.428	38		
1947	MLB	AL		8th	59	95	.383	38		
1948	MLB	AL		6th	59	94	.385	37		
1949	MLB	AL		7th	53	101	.344	44		
1950	MLB	AL		7th	58	96	.376	40		
1951	MLB	AL		8th	52	102	.337	46		
1952	MLB	AL		7th	64	90	.415	31		
1953	MLB	AL		8th	54	100	.351	46½		
Baltimore Orioles
1954	MLB	AL		7th	54	100	.351	57		
1955	MLB	AL		7th	57	97	.370	39		
1956	MLB	AL		6th	69	85	.448	28		
1957	MLB	AL		5th	76	76	.500	21		
1958	MLB	AL		6th	74	79	.483	17½		
1959	MLB	AL		6th	74	80	.480	20		
1960	MLB	AL		2nd	89	65	.578	8		Ron Hansen (ROY)
1961	MLB	AL		3rd	95	67	.586	14		
1962	MLB	AL		7th	77	85	.475	19		
1963	MLB	AL		4th	86	76	.531	18½		
1964	MLB	AL		3rd	97	65	.599	2		Brooks Robinson (MVP)
1965	MLB	AL		3rd	94	68	.580	8		Curt Blefary (ROY)
1966	MLB †	AL *		1st	97	63	.606	—	Won World Series (Dodgers) 4–0 †	Frank Robinson (MVP, TC, WS MVP)
1967	MLB	AL		6th	76	85	.472	15½		
1968	MLB	AL		2nd	91	71	.562	12		
1969	MLB	AL *	East ^	1st	109	53	.673	—	Won ALCS (Twins) 3–0; Lost World Series (Mets) 4–1 *	Mike Cuellar (CYA)
1970	MLB †	AL *	East ^	1st	108	54	.667	—	Won ALCS (Twins) 3–0; Won World Series (Reds) 4–1 †	Boog Powell (MVP); Brooks Robinson (WS MVP)
1971	MLB	AL *	East ^	1st	101	57	.639	—	Won ALCS (Athletics) 3–0; Lost World Series (Pirates) 4–3 *	
1972	MLB	AL	East	3rd	80	74	.519	5		
1973	MLB	AL	East ^	1st	97	65	.599	—	Lost ALCS (Athletics) 3–2	Jim Palmer (CYA); Al Bumbry (ROY)
1974	MLB	AL	East ^	1st	91	71	.562	—	Lost ALCS (Athletics) 3–1	
1975	MLB	AL	East	2nd	90	69	.566	4½		Jim Palmer (CYA)
1976	MLB	AL	East	2nd	88	74	.543	10½		Jim Palmer (CYA)
1977	MLB	AL	East	2nd	97	64	.602	2½		Eddie Murray (ROY)
1978	MLB	AL	East	4th	90	71	.559	9		
1979	MLB	AL *	East ^	1st	102	57	.642	—	Won ALCS (Angels) 3–1; Lost World Series (Pirates) 4–3 *	Mike Flanagan (CYA)
1980	MLB	AL	East	2nd	100	62	.617	3		Steve Stone (CYA)
1981	MLB	AL	East	2nd	31	23	.574	2		
1981	MLB	AL	East	4th	28	23	.549	2		
1982	MLB	AL	East	2nd	94	68	.580	1		Cal Ripken Jr. (ROY)
1983	MLB †	AL *	East ^	1st	98	64	.605	—	Won ALCS (White Sox) 3–1; Won World Series (Phillies) 4–1 †	Cal Ripken Jr. (MVP); Rick Dempsey (WS MVP)
1984	MLB	AL	East	5th	85	77	.524	19		
1985	MLB	AL	East	4th	83	78	.515	16		
1986	MLB	AL	East	7th	73	89	.451	22½		
1987	MLB	AL	East	6th	67	95	.413	31		
1988	MLB	AL	East	7th	54	107	.335	34½		
1989	MLB	AL	East	2nd	87	75	.537	2		Gregg Olson (ROY); Frank Robinson (MOY)
1990	MLB	AL	East	5th	76	85	.472	11½		
1991	MLB	AL	East	6th	67	95	.413	24		Cal Ripken Jr. (MVP)
1992	MLB	AL	East	3rd	89	73	.549	7		
1993	MLB	AL	East	3rd	85	77	.525	10		
1994	MLB	AL	East	2nd	63	49	.562	6½	Playoffs canceled	
1995	MLB	AL	East	3rd	71	73	.493	15		
1996	MLB	AL	East	2nd ¤	88	74	.543	4	Won ALDS (Indians) 3–1; Lost ALCS (Yankees) 4–1	
1997	MLB	AL	East ^	1st	98	64	.605	—	Won ALDS (Mariners) 3–1; Lost ALCS (Indians) 4–2	Davey Johnson (MOY)
1998	MLB	AL	East	4th	79	83	.487	35		
1999	MLB	AL	East	4th	78	84	.481	20		
2000	MLB	AL	East	4th	74	88	.456	13½		
2001	MLB	AL	East	4th	63	98	.391	32½		
2002	MLB	AL	East	4th	67	95	.413	36½		
2003	MLB	AL	East	4th	71	91	.438	30		
2004	MLB	AL	East	3rd	78	84	.481	23		
2005	MLB	AL	East	4th	74	88	.456	21		
2006	MLB	AL	East	4th	70	92	.432	27		
2007	MLB	AL	East	4th	69	93	.425	27		
2008	MLB	AL	East	5th	68	93	.422	28½		
2009	MLB	AL	East	5th	64	98	.395	39		
2010	MLB	AL	East	5th	66	96	.407	30		
2011	MLB	AL	East	5th	69	93	.426	28		
2012	MLB	AL	East	2nd ¤	93	69	.574	2	Won ALWC (Rangers); Lost ALDS (Yankees) 3–2	
2013	MLB	AL	East	T-3rd	85	77	.525	12		
2014	MLB	AL	East ^	1st	96	66	.593	—	Won ALDS (Tigers) 3–0; Lost ALCS (Royals) 4–0	Buck Showalter (MOY)
2015	MLB	AL	East	3rd	81	81	.500	12		
2016	MLB	AL	East	3rd ¤	89	73	.549	4	Lost ALWC (Blue Jays)	
2017	MLB	AL	East	5th	75	87	.463	18		
2018	MLB	AL	East	5th	47	115	.290	61		
2019	MLB	AL	East	5th	54	108	.333	49		
2020	MLB	AL	East	4th	25	35	.417	15		
2021	MLB	AL	East	5th	52	110	.321	48		
2022	MLB	AL	East	4th	83	79	.512	16		
2023	MLB	AL	East ^	1st	101	61	.623	—	Lost ALDS (Rangers) 3–0	Gunnar Henderson (ROY); Brandon Hyde (MOY)
2024	MLB	AL	East	2nd ¤	91	71	.562	3	Lost ALWC (Royals) 2–0	
2025	MLB	AL	East	5th	75	87	.463	19		
2026	MLB	AL	East	4th	79	82	.491	18.5		

== Postseason record by year ==
Year	Finish	Round	Opponent	Result		
St. Louis Browns (1902–1953)
1944	American League Champions	World Series	St. Louis Cardinals	Lost	2	4
Baltimore Orioles (1954–present)
1966	World Series Champions	World Series	Los Angeles Dodgers	Won	4	0
1969	American League Champions	ALCS	Minnesota Twins	Won	3	0
1969	American League Champions	World Series	New York Mets	Lost	1	4
1970	World Series Champions	ALCS	Minnesota Twins	Won	3	0
1970	World Series Champions	World Series	Cincinnati Reds	Won	4	1
1971	American League Champions	ALCS	Oakland Athletics	Won	3	0
1971	American League Champions	World Series	Pittsburgh Pirates	Lost	3	4
1973	American League East Champions	ALCS	Oakland Athletics	Lost	2	3
1974	American League East Champions	ALCS	Oakland Athletics	Lost	1	3
1979	American League Champions	ALCS	California Angels	Won	3	1
1979	American League Champions	World Series	Pittsburgh Pirates	Lost	3	4
1983	World Series Champions	ALCS	Chicago White Sox	Won	3	1
1983	World Series Champions	World Series	Philadelphia Phillies	Won	4	1
1996	American League Wild Card	ALDS	Cleveland Indians	Won	3	1
1996	American League Wild Card	ALCS	New York Yankees	Lost	1	4
1997	American League East Champions	ALDS	Seattle Mariners	Won	3	1
1997	American League East Champions	ALCS	Cleveland Indians	Lost	2	4
2012	American League Wild Card	Wild Card Game	Texas Rangers	Won	1	0
2012	American League Wild Card	ALDS	New York Yankees	Lost	2	3
2014	American League East Champions	ALDS	Detroit Tigers	Won	3	0
2014	American League East Champions	ALCS	Kansas City Royals	Lost	0	4
2016	American League Wild Card	Wild Card Game	Toronto Blue Jays	Lost	0	1
2023	American League East Champions	ALDS	Texas Rangers	Lost	0	3
2024	American League Wild Card	ALWS	Kansas City Royals	Lost	0	2

== Total record ==
	Won	Lost	Win%
Milwaukee Brewers (1901)
Regular season record	48	89	.350
St. Louis Browns (1902–1953)
Regular season record	3,414	4,465	.433
Postseason record	2	4	.333
Regular and postseason record	3,416	4,469	.433
Baltimore Orioles (1954–present)
Regular season record	5,812	5,699	.505
Postseason record	52	43	.547
Regular and postseason record	5,785	5,660	.505
All time (1901–present)
Regular season record	9,220	10,206	.475
Postseason record	54	47	.535
Regular and postseason record	9,274	10,253	.475

Up to date as of the end of the 2026 MLB regular season

== Postseason series record ==
	Series won	Series lost	Series win%	Postseason appearances	AL Pennants	World Series titles
St. Louis Browns (1902–1953)	0	1	.000	1	1	0
Baltimore Orioles (1954–present)	12	12	.500	15	6	3
All time (1901–present)	12	13	.480	16	7	3

== Record by decade ==
Decade	Wins	Losses	Pct
1900s	599	721	.454
1910s	597	892	.401
1920s	762	769	.498
1930s	578	951	.378
1940s	698	833	.456
1950s	632	905	.411
1960s	911	698	.566
1970s	944	656	.590
1980s	800	761	.512
1990s	794	757	.512
2000s	698	920	.431
2010s	755	865	.466
2020s	506	525	.491

Up to date as of the end of the 2026 MLB regular season
