= List of athletes who played in Major League Baseball and the National Football League =

Fewer than 70 athletes are known to have played in both Major League Baseball (MLB) (Note: MLB in this context collectively refers to the American League and National League. The two leagues were separate legal entities prior to 2000, when they merged into the present-day MLB legal entity.) and the National Football League (NFL). This includes two Heisman Trophy winners (Vic Janowicz and Bo Jackson) and seven members of the Pro Football Hall of Fame (Red Badgro, Paddy Driscoll, George Halas, Ernie Nevers, Ace Parker, Jim Thorpe, and Deion Sanders). However, none of the players on the list have been inducted into the Baseball Hall of Fame.

In 1920, the inaugural season of the NFL, (Note: The NFL adopted its current name in 1922; during 1920 and 1921 it was known as the American Professional Football Association (APFA).) 11 veterans of major-league baseball (including George Halas and Jim Thorpe) became the first athletes to accomplish the feat. Since 1970, only seven athletes have done so, including Bo Jackson and Deion Sanders. Jackson was the first athlete to be selected as an All-Star in both MLB and the NFL. Sanders holds the longevity record, having appeared in 641 MLB games and 189 NFL games.

== Overview ==
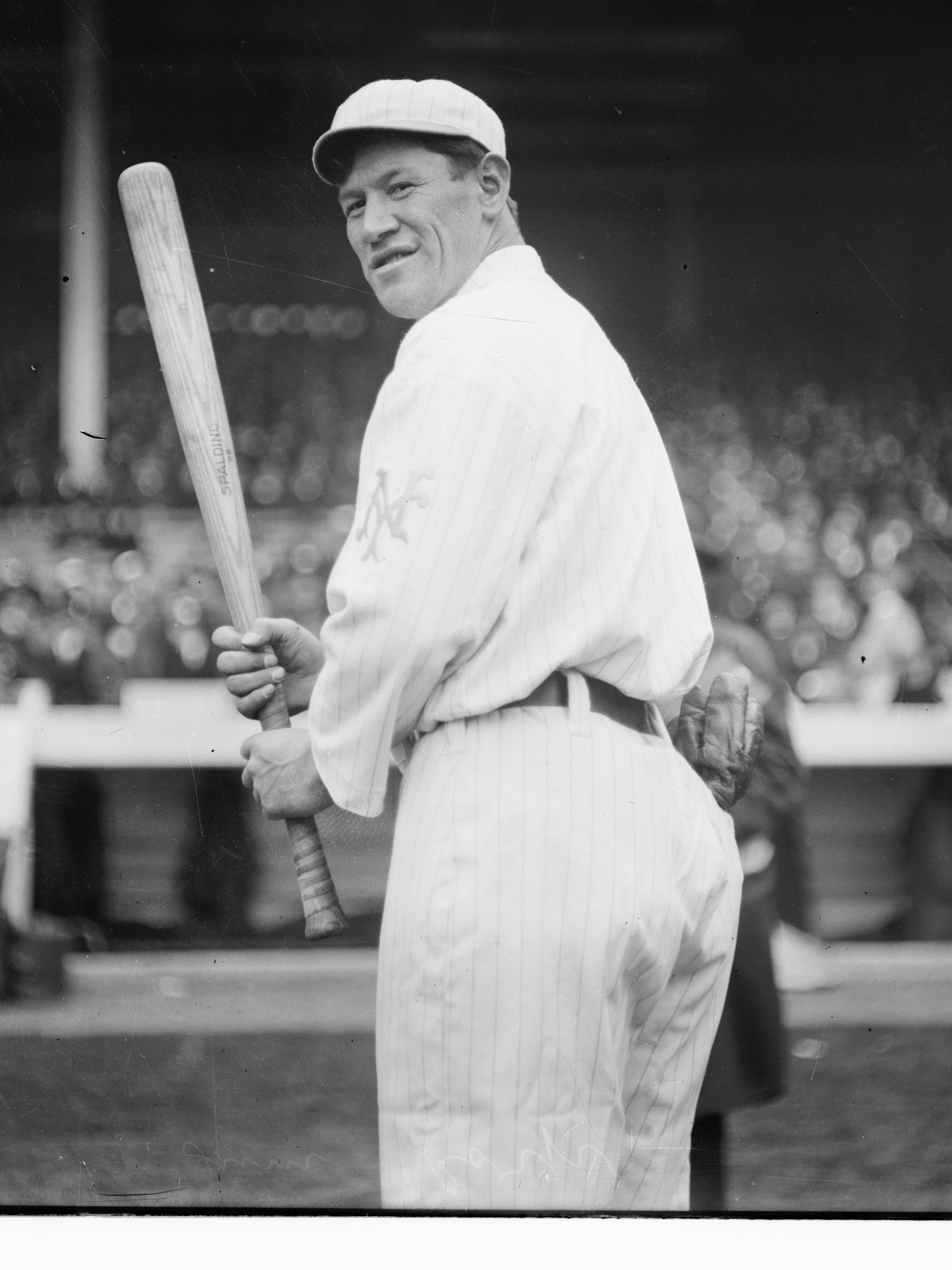
Jim Thorpe of the New York Giants

Since the formation of the National Football League (NFL), fewer than 70 athletes are known to have reached the highest level of play in both sports.

=== Early years ===
Christy Mathewson (MLB HOF) played Pro Football from 1898–1902. More than two-thirds of the athletes who played at the top level of both sports did so in the early years of the NFL during the 1920s and 1930s. The 1920 NFL season was the first in the league's history, and 11 veterans of Major League Baseball (MLB) participated in the inaugural campaign. The first group to appear in both sports included Jim Thorpe, a pioneer of professional football who began playing with the Canton Bulldogs in 1915. Thorpe was a Native American who grew up in the Sac and Fox Nation in Oklahoma. He was one of the most versatile athletes of his era, having won Olympic gold medals in 1912 for the pentathlon and decathlon and having also played professional basketball. Thorpe played in MLB from 1913 to 1919 and in the NFL from 1920 to 1928. He was later inducted into the Pro Football Hall of Fame.

The first group of MLB players to play in the NFL also included George Halas, who remained affiliated with the Chicago Bears as player, coach or owner from the 1920s until his death in 1983, Chuck Dressen, who later managed five Major League Baseball teams, including the Brooklyn Dodgers, from 1934 to 1966. and eight others (Lyle Bigbee, George Brickley, Garland Buckeye, Ralph Capron, Paul Des Jardien, Paddy Driscoll, Al Pierotti, and Tom Whelan).

Bert Kuczynski is one of a very small number of athletes to play Major League Baseball and in the NFL in the same year. In his senior year at Penn Kuczynski was on the NBC/Look Magazine 1942 All-American team as an end. After graduation in May 1943 he pitched in six games for the Philadelphia Athletics and played for the Detroit Lions in the 1943 NFL season. After two years in the Navy, in 1946 he played for the Philadelphia Eagles. While working on his master's degree in education at Penn, he was an assistant coach in the football program.

In 1954, former Ohio State star Vic Janowicz became the first Heisman Trophy winner to appear in both MLB and the NFL. After winning the Heisman in 1950, Janowicz played baseball for the Pittsburgh Pirates from 1953 to 1954 and football for the Washington Redskins from 1954 to 1955.

=== Modern players ===
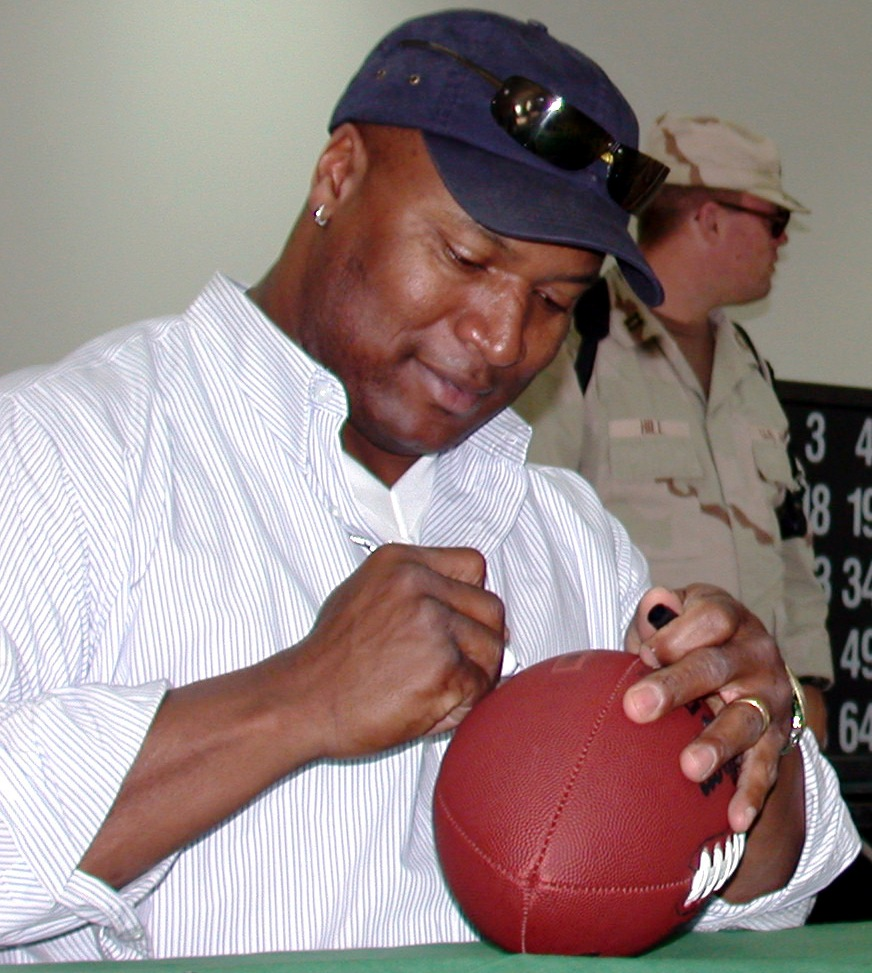
Bo Jackson in 2004

In 1987, Heisman Trophy winner Bo Jackson played for both the Los Angeles Raiders and the Kansas City Royals, becoming the first player to play in both the MLB and the NFL since the 1960s. Jackson played eight years in Major League Baseball and four years in the NFL. Jackson was also the first athlete to be named an All-Star in both sports. His versatility led Nike, Inc. to develop its "Bo Knows" ad campaign in which Jackson was envisioned attempting to take up a litany of other sports, including tennis, golf, hockey, luge, auto racing, and even playing blues music with Bo Diddley, who scolded Jackson by telling him, "You don't know diddley!"

In 1989, two years after Jackson's accomplishment, Deion Sanders played baseball for the New York Yankees and football for the Atlanta Falcons. Sanders had greater longevity playing in both sports than any other athlete in history, competing in Major League Baseball from 1989 to 2001 and in the NFL from 1989 to 2005. He led the National League with 14 triples in 1992 and finished second in the league in stolen bases twice: 1994 (38) and 1997 (56). Sanders also played in the 1992 World Series with the Atlanta Braves, hitting .533 in the series with five stolen bases in five attempts. He had a career batting average of .263, with 186 stolen bases and 43 triples in a nine-year career. In the NFL he was selected to play in eight Pro Bowls as a defensive back, and won two Super Bowls with the San Francisco 49ers and the Dallas Cowboys. Sanders had 53 career interceptions, returning 9 for touchdowns, and caught 60 passes for 784 yards and three touchdowns as a wide receiver. He was later inducted into the Pro Football Hall of Fame.

Brian Jordan is another notable two-sport athlete who played in both professional leagues. Jordan began his professional career in the NFL, playing three seasons as a safety for the Atlanta Falcons from 1989 to 1991. In his last two seasons in the NFL, Jordan started 30 of 32 games and had 5 interceptions and 4 sacks and appeared in the 1991 playoffs with the Falcons. In 1992, Jordan switched to baseball and played 15 years as an outfielder from 1992 to 2006, mostly for the St. Louis Cardinals and Atlanta Braves. He had a career batting average of .282 with 1454 hits and 184 home runs. He was selected as an All-Star in 1999 and played in the World Series that same year. He appeared in post-season a total of five times, hitting six home runs in 38 games.

The last player to accomplish the feat was Drew Henson, who was a third baseman for the New York Yankees from 2002 to 2003 and a quarterback for the Dallas Cowboys and Detroit Lions in 2004 and 2008.

In total, only seven players have accomplished the feat since 1970. They are Jackson, Sanders, Jordan, Henson, Chad Hutchinson, D.J. Dozier, and Matt Kinzer.

=== Notable omissions ===
Cal Hubbard is the only person to be inducted into both the Baseball Hall of Fame and the Pro Football Hall of Fame. He played in the NFL from 1927 to 1936 and later served as an umpire in Major League Baseball. As he was inducted into the Baseball Hall of Fame as an umpire, and never appeared as a player, he is not included on the list.

Greasy Neale is another person who gained fame in both sports but who is omitted from the list. Neale played eight years in Major League Baseball, mostly for the Cincinnati Reds, from 1916 to 1924. He also played for the Dayton Triangles in 1918 before the NFL was established. He later served as the coach of the Philadelphia Eagles from 1941 to 1950 and has been inducted into both the Pro Football Hall of Fame and the College Football Hall of Fame. However, he never appeared as a player in an official NFL game and is therefore not included in the list.

== List of players ==
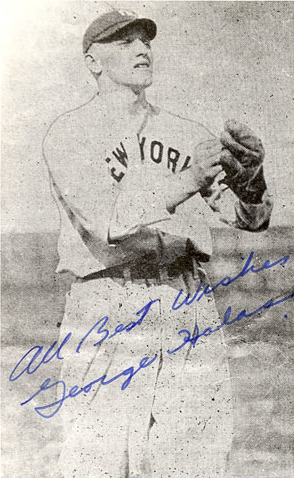
George Halas played for the New York Yankees in 1919 before starting his 63-year affiliation with the Chicago Bears.

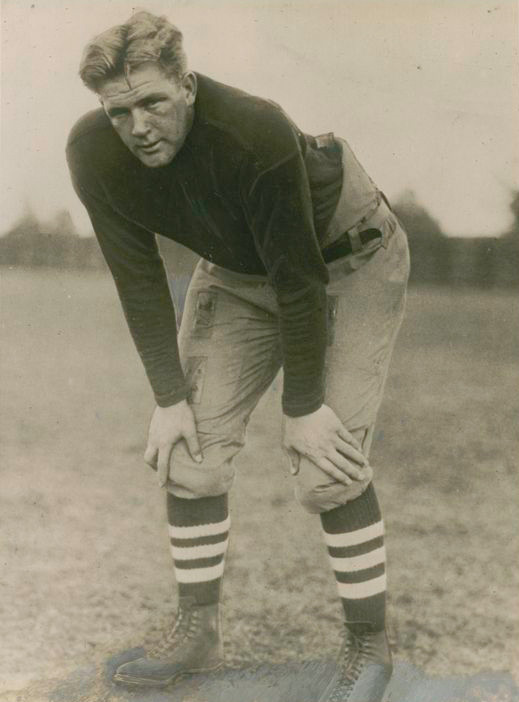
Former Stanford All-American Ernie Nevers played MLB and in the NFL during the 1920s.

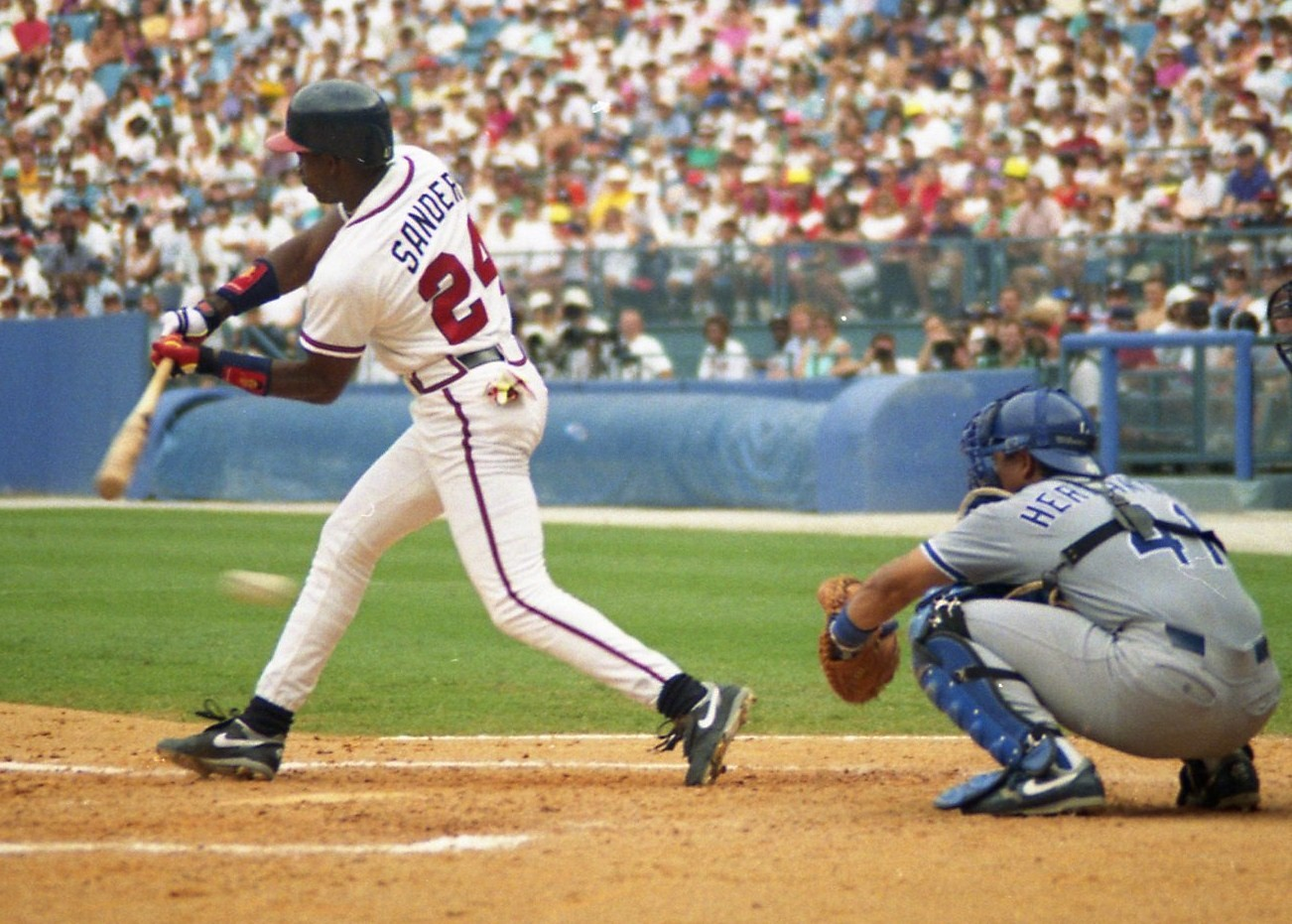
Deion Sanders appeared in a record 641 MLB games and 189 NFL games.

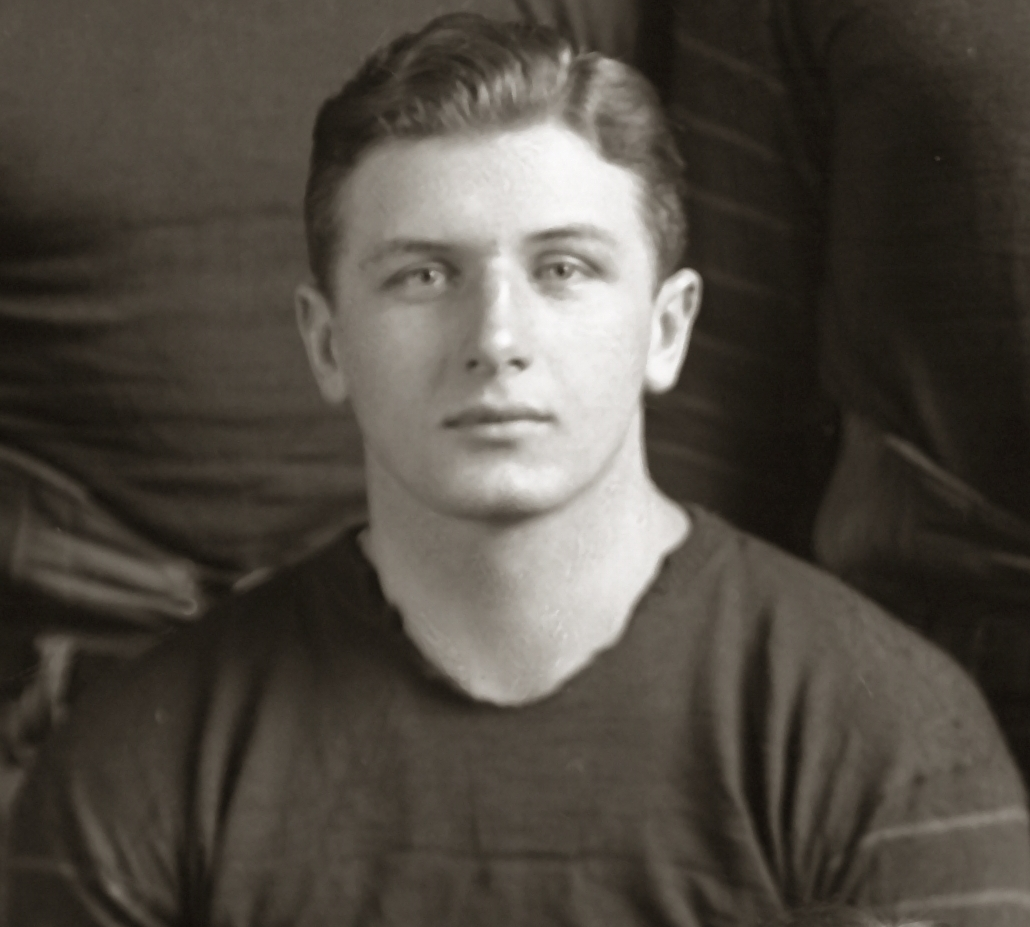
Former Michigan All-American Ernie Vick was a catcher for the St. Louis Cardinals for four years and played for three NFL teams.

The following athletes have appeared in at least one game in both Major League Baseball and the National Football League.

Name	MLB teams	MLB games played	NFL teams	NFL games played
Cliff Aberson	Chicago Cubs (1947–1949)	63	Green Bay Packers (1946)	10
Red Badgro	St. Louis Browns (1929–1930)	143	three teams (1927–1936)	94
Norm Bass	Kansas City Athletics (1961–1963)	65	Denver Broncos (1964)	1
Charlie Berry	four teams (1927–1938)	709	Pottsville Maroons (1925–1926)	20
Larry Bettencourt	St. Louis Browns (1928–1932)	168	Green Bay Packers (1933)	2
Lyle Bigbee	two teams (1920–1921)	17	Milwaukee Badgers (1922)	3
George Brickley	Philadelphia Athletics (1913)	5	Cleveland Tigers (1920)	7
Tom Brown	Washington Senators (1963)	61	two teams (1964–1969)	71
Garland Buckeye	three teams (1918–1928)	108	two teams (1920–1924)	40
Bruce Caldwell	two teams (1928, 1932)	25	New York Giants (1928)	10
Ralph Capron	two teams (1912–1913)	3	Chicago Tigers (1920)	1
Jim Castiglia	Philadelphia Athletics (1942)	16	three teams (1941–1948)	42
Chuck Corgan	Brooklyn Robins (1925, 1927)	33	three teams (1924–1927)	30
Paul Des Jardien	Cleveland Indians (1916)	1	Chicago Tigers (1920)	9
D.J. Dozier	New York Mets (1992)	25	two teams (1987–1991)	43
Chuck Dressen	two teams (1925–1931)	646	two teams (1920–1923)	12
Paddy Driscoll	Chicago Cubs (1917)	13	two teams (1920–1929)	118
Ox Eckhardt	two teams (1932, 1936)	24	New York Giants (1928)	11
Steve Filipowicz	two teams (1944–1948)	57	New York Giants (1945–1946)	21
Paul Florence	New York Giants (1926)	76	Chicago Cardinals (1920)	9
Walter French	Philadelphia Athletics (1923–1929)	397	two teams (1922, 1925)	10
Wally Gilbert	two teams (1928–1932)	591	Duluth Kelleys (1923–1926)	17
Norm Glockson	Cincinnati Reds (1914)	7	Racine Legion (1922)	1
Frank Grube	two teams (1931–1936)	394	New York Yankees (1928)	11
Bruno Haas	Philadelphia Athletics (1915)	6	three teams (1921–1922)	11
Hinkey Haines	New York Yankees (1923)	28	two teams (1925–1931)	53
George Halas	New York Yankees (1919)	12	Chicago Bears (1920–1928)	104
Carroll Hardy	four teams (1957–1967)	433	San Francisco 49ers (1955)	10
Drew Henson	New York Yankees (2002–2003)	8	two teams (2004, 2008)	9
Chad Hutchinson	St. Louis Cardinals (2001)	3	two teams (2002–2004)	15
Bo Jackson	three teams (1986–1994)	694	Los Angeles Raiders (1987–1990)	38
Lefty Jamerson	Boston Red Sox (1924)	1	Hartford Blues (1926)	3
Vic Janowicz	Pittsburgh Pirates (1953–1954)	83	Washington Redskins (1954–1955)	22
Rex Johnston	Pittsburgh Pirates (1964)	14	Pittsburgh Steelers (1960)	12
Brian Jordan	four teams (1992–2006)	1,456	Atlanta Falcons (1989–1991)	36
Matt Kinzer	two teams (1989–1990)	9	Detroit Lions (1987)	1
Bert Kuczynski	Philadelphia Athletics (1943)	6	two teams (1943, 1946)	5
Pete Layden	St. Louis Browns (1948)	41	New York Yankees (1948–1950)	31
Jim Levey	St. Louis Browns (1930–1933)	440	Pittsburgh Pirates (1934–1936)	13
Dean Look	Chicago White Sox (1961)	3	New York Titans (1962)	1
Waddy Macphee	New York Giants (1922)	2	Providence Steam Roller (1926)	10
Howard Maple	Washington Senators (1932)	44	Chicago Cardinals (1930)	8
Walt Masters	three teams (1931, 1937–1939)	8	two teams (1936, 1943–1944)	12
John Mohardt	Detroit Tigers (1922)	5	four teams (1922–1925)	42
Ernie Nevers	St. Louis Browns (1926–1928)	44	two teams (1926–1931)	54
Ossie Orwoll	Philadelphia Athletics (1928–1929)	94	Milwaukee Badgers (1926)	3
Ace Parker	Philadelphia Athletics (1937–1938)	94	three teams (1937–1946)	68
John Perrin	Boston Red Sox (1921)	4	Hartford Blues (1926)	6
Al Pierotti	Boston Braves (1920–1921)	8	seven teams (1920–1929)	46
Pid Purdy	two teams (1926–1929)	181	Green Bay Packers (1926–1927)	17
Dick Reichle	Boston Red Sox (1922–1923)	128	Milwaukee Badgers (1923)	6
Deion Sanders	four teams (1989–2001)	641	four teams (1989–2005)	188
Johnny Scalzi	Boston Braves (1931)	2	Brooklyn Dodgers (1931)	7
Red Smith	New York Giants (1927)	1	five teams (1927–1931)	37
Evar Swanson	two teams (1929–1934)	518	three teams (1924–1927)	27
Jim Thorpe	three teams (1913–1919)	289	multiple teams (1920–1928)	52
Andy Tomasic	New York Giants (1949)	2	Pittsburgh Steelers (1942, 1946)	15
Luke Urban	Boston Braves (1927–1928)	50	Buffalo All-Americans (1921–1923)	32
Joe Vance	two teams (1935–1938)	15	Brooklyn Dodgers (1931)	11
Ernie Vick	St. Louis Cardinals (1922–1926)	57	two teams (1925–1927)	27
Tom Whelan	Boston Braves (1920)	1	two teams (1920–1921)	20
Mike Wilson	Pittsburgh Pirates (1921)	5	two teams (1922–1924)	17
Hoge Workman	Boston Red Sox (1924)	11	two teams (1924, 1931–1932)	19
Ab Wright	two teams (1935, 1944)	138	Frankfort Yellow Jackets (1930)	4
Tom Yewcic	Detroit Tigers (1957)	1	Boston Patriots (1961–1966)	77
Russ Young	St. Louis Browns (1931)	16	Dayton Triangles (1925)	4
Joe Zapustas	Philadelphia Athletics (1933)	2	New York Giants (1933)	2
