= Holshouser =

Holshouser is a Germanic surname. Notable people with the surname include:

- Herm Holshouser (1907–1994), American baseball player
- James Holshouser (1934–2013), American lawyer and politician
- Patricia Hollingsworth Holshouser (1939–2006), American nurse and civic leader
