= Norm Bass =

American baseball player (born 1939)

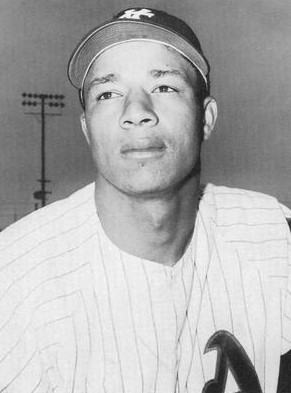
- Bass in 1963
- Pitcher
- Born: January 21, 1939; Laurel, Mississippi, U.S.
- Died: June 15, 2024 (aged 85); Inglewood, California, U.S.
- Batted: Right Threw: Right

MLB debut
- April 23, 1961, for the Kansas City Athletics

Last MLB appearance
- April 26, 1963, for the Kansas City Athletics

MLB statistics
- Win–loss record: 13–17
- Earned run average: 5.32
- Strikeouts: 111
- Stats at Baseball Reference

Teams
- Kansas City Athletics (1961–1963)

Norm Bass
No. 46
- Position: Safety

Personal information
- Listed height: 6 ft 3 in (1.91 m)
- Listed weight: 210 lb (95 kg)

Career information
- High school: Vallejo High School
- College: Pacific
- NFL draft: 1964: undrafted

Career history
- Denver Broncos (1964)
- Stats at Pro Football Reference

Norman Delaney Bass Jr. (January 21, 1939 – June 15, 2024) was an American college and professional football player and baseball player. He was a pitcher for the Kansas City Athletics from 1961 to 1963. A safety in football, he played college football at the University of the Pacific, and professionally in the American Football League for the Denver Broncos in 1964. Bass became an international table tennis player. His 2–sport athlete status came about because arthritis forced him to retire from baseball. He is the brother of NFL player Dick Bass.

== Baseball career ==
Bass pitched in 65 games (34 starts) for the Kansas City Athletics, finishing with a 13–17 record and a 5.32 career ERA in his Major League career. In his rookie year with the Athletics he had 11 wins and 11 losses. Bass signed with the Athletics before the 1958 season and made his debut with the Pocatello A's. He worked his way to the major leagues, making his debut at age 22. As a hitter, he hit his lone major league home run in 1961. Bass pitched in one minor league game in 1965, a complete game victory, but his baseball career ended after that performance.

== Football career ==
Bass played safety for the Denver Broncos in 1964 after arthritis cut short his 1964 baseball season. The Broncos were an American Football League team that went 2–11–1 that season, with Bass playing Defensive Back and wearing uniform number 46. From 1960 to 1969, his brother, Dick Bass, was a running back for the Los Angeles Rams.

== Two–sport athlete ==
Bass played both football and baseball in college and joined the Denver Broncos after he was unable pitch effectively in 1964, due to arthritis. The arthritis forced him to retire from football as well. Bass is one of the few players (there are less than 70) to play both baseball and football professionally.

== Table tennis ==
Bass took up table tennis in the 1970s and became a ranked player in his age groups. He played for the United States Paralympic table tennis team in 1998. He won a bronze medal at the 2000 Paralympic Games in Sydney, Australia. Bass' table tennis career accomplishments led to him being elected to the Table Tennis Hall of Fame.

== Personal ==
Bass was stricken with meningitis at age 10 and had to be quarantined for a time after the illness almost took his life. The illness left him blind and deaf for three months.

Bass followed his older brother Dick Bass in starring at Vallejo High School and attending the University of Pacific, where he was a multi–sport athlete.

In signing with the Kansas City Athletics, Bass received a $4,000 signing bonus, which he used to support his young family.

Norm Bass had a career working for McDonnell Douglas, retiring after 30 years with the company.

In 2005, Bass' son, Norman Delaney Bass, III, wrote a biography of his father. The book is titled "Color Him Father: An American Journey of Hope and Redemption." ISBN 978-1-419-65007-9.

Bass was elected to the Table Tennis Hall of Fame in 2018.

Bass died on June 15, 2024 at the age of 85. He is interred at Inglewood Park Cemetery.

== See also ==
- List of American Football League players
  List of athletes who played in Major League Baseball and the National Football League
