= Benny Bengough =

American baseball player (1898–1968)

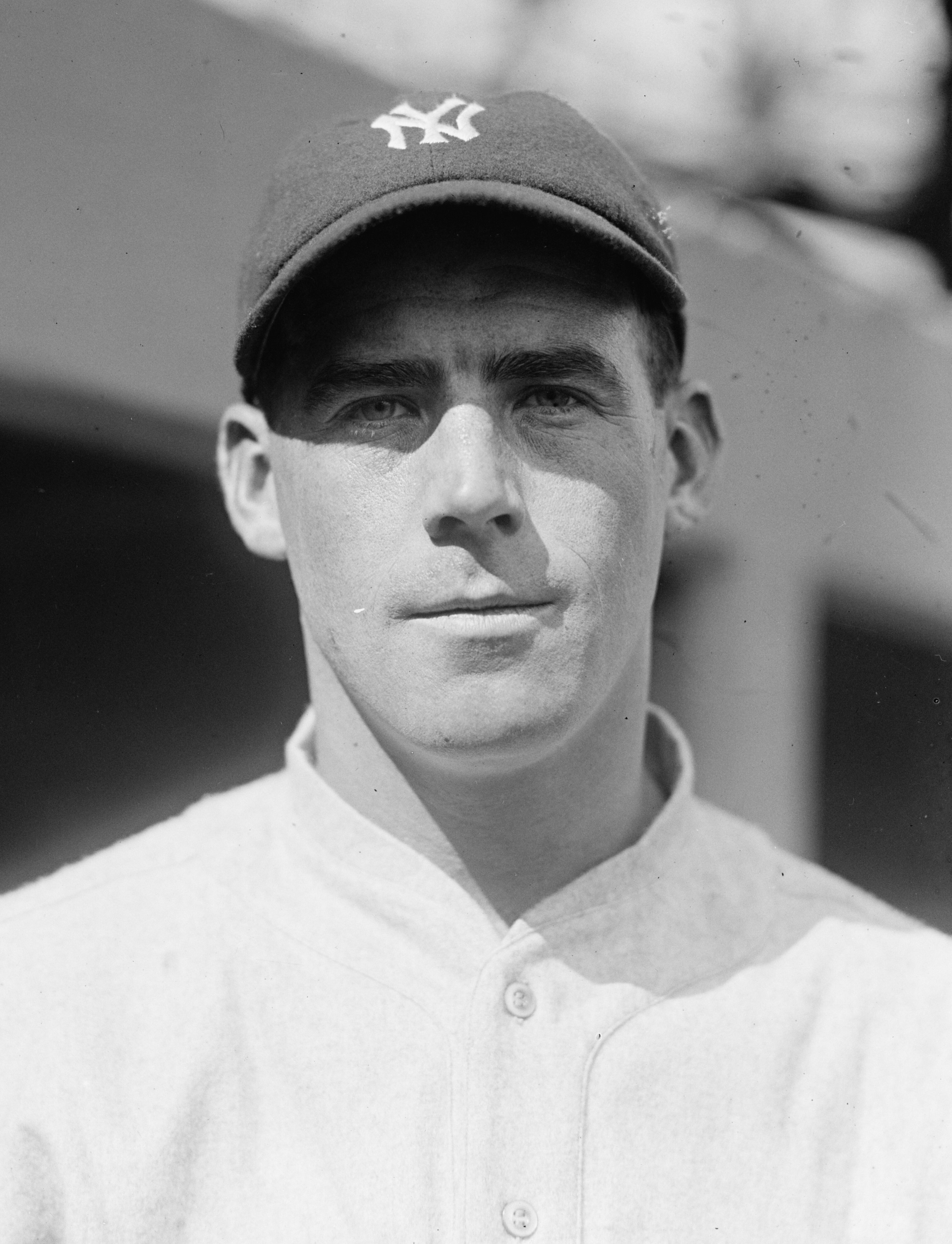
- Bengough in 1924
- Catcher
- Born: July 27, 1898; Niagara Falls, New York, U.S.
- Died: December 22, 1968 (aged 70); Philadelphia, Pennsylvania, U.S.
- Batted: Right Threw: Right

MLB debut
- May 18, 1923, for the New York Yankees

Last MLB appearance
- September 24, 1932, for the St. Louis Browns

MLB statistics
- Batting average: .255
- Hits: 287
- Runs batted in: 108
- Stats at Baseball Reference

Teams
- New York Yankees (1923–1930); St. Louis Browns (1931–1932)

Career highlights and awards
- 3× World Series champion (1923, 1927, 1928)

Bernard Oliver "Benny" Bengough (July 27, 1898 – December 22, 1968) was an American professional baseball player and coach. He played the majority of his Major League Baseball career as a catcher for the New York Yankees during the 1920s when the team garnered the nickname of Murderers' Row, due to their potent batting lineup. He played the final two seasons of his career with the St. Louis Browns. Bengough was a light-hitting, defensive specialist. After his playing career, he spent 18 seasons as a major league coach.

== Baseball career ==
Born in Niagara Falls, New York, Bengough was a graduate of Niagara University. He began his professional baseball career at the age of 18 with the Buffalo Bisons of the International League in 1917. After having played for six seasons in Buffalo, he made his major league debut with the Yankees on May 18, 1923 at the age of 24. 1923 was also the first year the Yankees played their home games in Yankee Stadium. At the beginning of his playing career, Bengough served as a backup catcher to Wally Schang. On June 1, 1925, the same day that Lou Gehrig replaced Wally Pipp as the Yankees' first baseman, Bengough was given the Yankees' starting catcher's job. He ended the season with a .258 batting average along with a career-high 14 doubles and 23 runs batted in.

Although Bengough was a good defensive player, his offense did not satisfy Yankees manager Miller Huggins and, he returned to his role as a backup catcher for the next few seasons. He had a close friendship with teammate Babe Ruth, both on and off the field. In 1926, Bengough developed a recurring throwing arm injury and the ailment would keep him from playing in the 1926 World Series. He began to play regularly late in the 1928 season and started in all four games of the 1928 World Series, as the Yankees swept the St. Louis Cardinals. He led American League catchers in 1928 with a .992 fielding percentage.

Bengough's arm injury continued to hamper him during spring training in 1929 as Bill Dickey took over as the Yankees starting catcher, going on to a successful career and eventual induction into the Baseball Hall of Fame. In 1930, the Yankees released Bengough to the Milwaukee Brewers of the American Association. In July 1931, he returned to the major leagues with the St. Louis Browns, where he served as a backup catcher to future Hall of Fame member, Rick Ferrell. He played in his final major league game on September 24, 1932. Bengough then returned to the minor leagues where he served as a player-manager for the Washington Generals of the Pennsylvania State Association in 1933 and 1934. He became the player-manager of the Joplin Miners from 1936 to 1937 before retiring as a player at the age of 38.

== Career statistics ==
In a ten-year major league career, Bengough played in 411 games, accumulating 287 hits in 1,125 at bats for a .255 career batting average, along with no home runs, 108 runs batted in and an on-base percentage of .295. He had a career fielding percentage of .988 which was 10 points above the league average during his playing career. Bengough caught for five pitchers who would eventually be inducted into the Baseball Hall of Fame.

== Coaching career ==
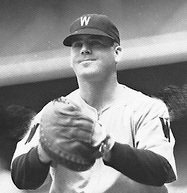
Bengough as coach of the Washington Senators, circa 1940–43.

After retiring as a player, Bengough was named as a coach for the Newark Bears in December 1937. Bengough became known for entertaining spectators with his humor from the coaching box. He would often remove his cap to reveal his bald head and then run his fingers through his imaginary hair. Bengough coached in the major leagues for the Washington Senators (1940–43), Boston Braves (1944–45) and Philadelphia Phillies (1946–58). He reached another World Series as a coach when the 1950 Phillies team known as the Whiz Kids won the National League pennant. Bengough was relieved of his Phillies coaching duties on April 11, 1959, but continued to work for the organization in public relations.

== Later life ==
In 1959, Bengough was named as the head of the Junior Baseball Federation of Philadelphia which raised funds for under-privileged children. He died of a heart attack in Philadelphia, Pennsylvania on December 22, 1968, at age 70.
