= Bill Killefer =

American baseball player, coach, and manager (1887–1960)

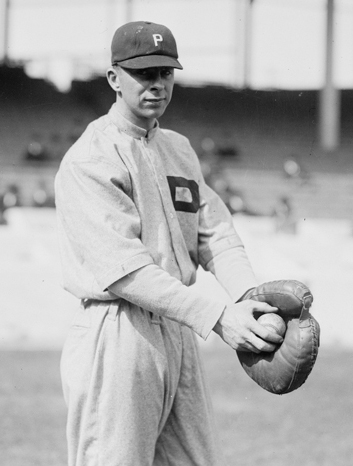
- Reindeer Bill Killefer, Philadelphia Phillies, Library of Congress photograph
- Catcher / Manager
- Born: October 10, 1887; Bloomingdale, Michigan, U.S.
- Died: July 3, 1960 (aged 72); Elsmere, Delaware, U.S.
- Batted: Right Threw: Right

MLB debut
- September 13, 1909, for the St. Louis Browns

Last MLB appearance
- October 1, 1921, for the Chicago Cubs

MLB statistics
- Batting average: .238
- Home runs: 4
- Runs batted in: 240
- Managerial record: 524–622
- Winning %: .457
- Stats at Baseball Reference

Teams
- As player: St. Louis Browns (1909–1910); Philadelphia Phillies (1911–1917); Chicago Cubs (1918–1921); As manager: Chicago Cubs (1921–1925); St. Louis Browns (1930–1933); As coach: St. Louis Cardinals (1926); St. Louis Browns (1927–1929); Brooklyn Dodgers (1939); Philadelphia Phillies (1942)

William Lavier Killefer (October 10, 1887 – July 3, 1960), nicknamed "Reindeer Bill", was an American professional baseball player, coach, and manager. He played in Major League Baseball as a catcher from 1909 to 1921 for the St. Louis Browns, Philadelphia Phillies, and Chicago Cubs. Killefer, who was nicknamed "Reindeer Bill" due to his speed afoot, is notable for being the favorite catcher of Hall of Fame pitcher Grover Cleveland Alexander and, for being one of the top defensive catchers of his era. After his playing career, he continued to work as a coach and a manager for a Major League Baseball career that spanned a total of 48 years.

== Major League career ==
Killefer made his major league debut at the age of 21 with the St. Louis Browns on September 13, 1909. After the 1910 season in which the Browns finished in last place, Killefer was released to the Buffalo Bisons of the Eastern League. Under the tutelage of Bisons' manager George Stallings, Killefer developed into a refined catcher.

His contract was purchased by the Philadelphia Phillies on August 19, 1911, and he played his first game as a starter on October 3. The Phillies pitcher on that day was Grover Cleveland Alexander, and the game marked the first of 250 times the pair teamed up as a battery in the major leagues. Although he was a light hitter, Killefer became known for his strong defensive skills. In 1913, he led National League catchers with 166 assists, 130 baserunners caught stealing, a 50.6% caught stealing percentage, and finished second in putouts and fielding percentage.

In 1914, Killefer made news when it was reported that he had signed with the Chicago Whales of the Federal League, although he denied the report. When the Phillies offered him a salary increase, he decided to sign with the Phillies, which led the Federal League to file a lawsuit against him and the Phillies. A judge ruled against the Federal League and Killefer remained with the Phillies.

From 1915 to 1917, Alexander and Killefer solidified their reputation as the best battery in baseball, with Alexander posting three consecutive 30-win seasons. Killefer had one of his best seasons for the Phillies in 1917. He led National League catchers with a .984 fielding percentage, as well as in putouts, double plays, and total chances. He also had one of his best seasons offensively with a .274 batting average.

After the 1917 season, in one of the most lopsided trades in major league history, the financially strapped Phillies sent Killefer and Alexander to the Chicago Cubs for two players and $55,000 in cash. With the Cubs, Killefer was credited with strengthening their pitching staff. The Cubs won the 1918 National League pennant before losing to the Boston Red Sox in the 1918 World Series. Killefer had another strong season in 1919, hitting a career-high .286 batting average and leading National League catchers in fielding percentage, putouts and assists. He served as player-manager for the Cubs in 1921 before retiring as a player at age 33.

== Career statistics ==
In a thirteen-year major league career, Killefer played in 1,035 games, accumulating 751 hits in 3,150 at bats for a .238 career batting average along with 4 home runs and 240 runs batted in. He had a career fielding percentage of .977. While he was not a powerful hitter, he possessed a strong throwing arm and a talent for working with pitchers. Killefer led National League catchers in fielding percentage four consecutive seasons from 1916 to 1919. He also led the league three times in putouts, assists and in baserunners caught stealing. Killefer caught 115 shutouts in his career, ranking him 16th all-time among major league catchers.

Killefer's reputation as a defensive standout is enhanced because of the era in which he played. In the Deadball Era, catchers played a huge defensive role, given the large number of bunts and stolen base attempts, as well as the difficulty of handling the spitball pitchers who dominated pitching staffs. Richard Kendall of the Society for American Baseball Research devised a study that ranked Killefer as the most dominating fielding catcher in major league history.

== Managing and coaching career ==
After his playing career ended, Killefer continued as manager of the Cubs until he was fired after 75 games in 1925. He was hired by St. Louis Cardinals manager Rogers Hornsby as a coach for the 1926 season. The Cardinals went on to win the 1926 World Series with Killefer receiving credit for his help with the pitching staff. In 1927, he was hired by the St. Louis Browns as a coach, and he became their manager in 1930. Killefer enjoyed little success as the Browns' manager, never finishing above fifth place as the depression-era team had cut its payroll significantly. He was fired in 1933 and took two years off from organised baseball.

Killefer accepted a role as manager for the Sacramento Solons in the Pacific Coast League, leading them to a first-place finish in 1937. He later coached for the Brooklyn Dodgers and managed the minor league Milwaukee Brewers. His managerial record was 524–622 (.457) in nine seasons. Killefer's last on-the-field position in the major leagues was as a coach for the 1942 Philadelphia Phillies. He also served as a scout for the Cleveland Indians, the Phillies and the Dodgers. As a scout for the Indians, Killefer was involved in the signing of Larry Doby in 1947 (the American League's first black player). Killefer was credited with helping the development of such catching standouts as Bob O'Farrell, Gabby Hartnett, Rick Ferrell, and Walker Cooper.

He died in Elsmere, Delaware, at age 72. His brother, Red Killefer, was also a major league baseball player. Political economist Nancy Killefer is a granddaughter.

=== Managerial record ===
Team	Year	Regular season					Postseason			
Team	Year	Games	Won	Lost	Win %	Finish	Won	Lost	Win %	Result
CHC	1921	57	23	34	.404	7th in NL	–	–	–	–
CHC	1922	154	80	74	.519	5th in NL	–	–	–	–
CHC	1923	154	83	71	.539	4th in NL	–	–	–	–
CHC	1924	153	81	72	.529	5th in NL	–	–	–	–
CHC	1925	75	33	42	.440	fired	–	–	–	–
CHC total		593	300	293	.506		0	0	–	
SLB	1930	154	64	90	.416	6th in AL	–	–	–	–
SLB	1931	154	63	91	.409	5th in AL	–	–	–	–
SLB	1932	154	63	91	.409	6th in AL	–	–	–	–
SLB	1933	91	34	57	.374	fired	–	–	–	–
SLB total		553	224	329	.405		0	0	–	
Total		1146	524	622	.457		0	0	–	

== See also ==
- List of Major League Baseball player–managers
- List of St. Louis Cardinals coaches
