= Herb Cobb =

American baseball player (1904-1980)

- Pitcher
- Born: August 6, 1904; Pinetops, North Carolina
- Died: January 8, 1980 (aged 75); Tarboro, North Carolina
- Batted: Right Threw: Right

MLB debut
- April 21, 1929, for the St. Louis Browns

Last MLB appearance
- April 21, 1929, for the St. Louis Browns

MLB statistics
- Games: 1
- Earned run average: 36.00
- Innings pitched: 1.0

Teams
- St. Louis Browns (1929)

Herbert Edward Cobb (August 6, 1904 – January 8, 1980) was a Major League Baseball pitcher who played in one game for the St. Louis Browns on April 21, 1929. He pitched the eighth inning for the Browns, facing seven batters, and giving up four earned runs on three hits.

== Pro career ==
Herb Cobb's pro career began with the Wilson Bugs of the Virginia league as a nineteen year old pitcher. That year he won nine games and lost sixteen games and finished with 4.24 E.R.A. His breakout season for Wilson game in 1926 when he won twenty games for the club while losing thirteen. He attracted the attention of scouts and signed with the St. Louis Browns, who then assigned Cobb to the minor league team in Wichita Falls in the Texas League. After going 14–7 in Wichita Falls, he was promoted to the Browns' Double A team, the Milwaukee Brewers.

In 1929, Cobb made his first and only appearance in the major leagues. He came on in relief off Chad Kimsey, who'd just surrendered seven runs himself in a relief appearance. In his only inning of work, Cobb gave up three hits and allowed four runs, all earned, including surrendering a home run to Tigers pitcher Earl Whitehill, where Cobb surrendered three of the runs he allowed. The Detroit Tigers defeated the St. Louis Browns in that game, 16–9. After the game, Cobb was demoted to Milwaukee and never again appeared in the major leagues. His baseball career ended in 1931 after he was released by the St. Louis Browns.
