= Ed Roetz =

American baseball player (1905-1965)

- Infielder
- Born: August 6, 1905; Philadelphia, Pennsylvania, U.S.
- Died: March 16, 1965 (aged 59); Philadelphia, Pennsylvania, U.S.
- Batted: Right Threw: Right

MLB debut
- May 26, 1929, for the St. Louis Browns

Last MLB appearance
- October 6, 1929, for the St. Louis Browns

MLB statistics
- Batting average: .244
- Home runs: 0
- Runs batted in: 5
- Stats at Baseball Reference

Teams
- St. Louis Browns (1929)

Edward Bernard Roetz (August 6, 1905 – March 16, 1965) was an American professional baseball player. He was an infielder during one season (1929) with the St. Louis Browns. For his career, he compiled a .244 batting average in 45 at-bats and drove in five runs. Roetz also played 11 seasons in the minor leagues, hitting .296 with 116 home runs.

He was born and later died in Philadelphia at the age of 59.
