= Buck Stanton =

American baseball player (1906-1992)

- Pinch hitter / Right fielder
- Born: June 19, 1906; Stantonsburg, North Carolina, U.S.
- Died: January 1, 1992 (aged 85); San Antonio, Texas, U.S.
- Batted: Left Threw: Left

MLB debut
- September 5, 1931, for the St. Louis Browns

Last MLB appearance
- September 26, 1931, for the St. Louis Browns

MLB statistics
- Games played: 13
- At bats: 15
- Hits: 3
- Stats at Baseball Reference

Teams
- St. Louis Browns (1931)

George Washington Stanton (June 19, 1906 – January 1, 1992) was an American Major League Baseball right fielder who played for the St. Louis Browns in 1931. He was used as a pinch hitter in twelve of his thirteen games.
