= Art Scharein =

American baseball player (1905-1969)

- Third baseman
- Born: June 30, 1905; Decatur, Illinois, U.S.
- Died: July 2, 1969 (aged 64); San Antonio, Texas, U.S.
- Batted: Right Threw: Right

MLB debut
- July 6, 1932, for the St. Louis Browns

Last MLB appearance
- June 3, 1934, for the St. Louis Browns

MLB statistics
- Batting average: .244
- Home runs: 0
- Runs batted in: 70
- Stats at Baseball Reference

Teams
- St. Louis Browns (1932–1934)

Arthur Otto "Scoop" Scharein (June 30, 1905 – July 2, 1969) was an American third baseman in Major League Baseball. He played for the St. Louis Browns.
