= Len Dondero =

American baseball player (1903–1999)

- Third baseman/Second baseman
- Born: September 12, 1903; Newark, California
- Died: January 1, 1999 (aged 95); Fremont, California
- Batted: Right Threw: Right

MLB debut
- April 12, 1929, for the St. Louis Browns

Last MLB appearance
- August 11, 1929, for the St. Louis Browns

MLB statistics
- Batting average: .194
- Home runs: 1
- Runs batted in: 8
- Stats at Baseball Reference

Teams
- St. Louis Browns (1929)

Leonard Peter Dondero (September 12, 1903 – January 1, 1999) was a Major League Baseball third baseman and second baseman who played with the St. Louis Browns in 1929.
