= Jim McLaughlin (third baseman) =

American baseball player (1902-1968)

- Third baseman
- Born: January 3, 1902; St. Louis, Missouri
- Died: December 15, 1968 (aged 66); Mount Vernon, Illinois
- Batted: Right Threw: Right

MLB debut
- April 18, 1932, for the St. Louis Browns

Last MLB appearance
- April 18, 1932, for the St. Louis Browns

MLB statistics
- Games played: 1
- At bats: 1
- Runs batted in: 1
- Stats at Baseball Reference

Teams
- St. Louis Browns (1932)

James Robert McLaughlin (January 3, 1902 – December 15, 1968) was a Major League Baseball third baseman. He played one game for the St. Louis Browns in 1932. In his lone plate appearance, he drove in a run while making an out against Whit Wyatt.

Prior to his brief major league career, McLaughlin played eight seasons with the Sacramento Senators of the Pacific Coast League from 1924 until 1931. He batted .296 with 28 home runs during that time. He did not play professionally after 1932.
