= Herm Holshouser =

American baseball player (1907-1994)

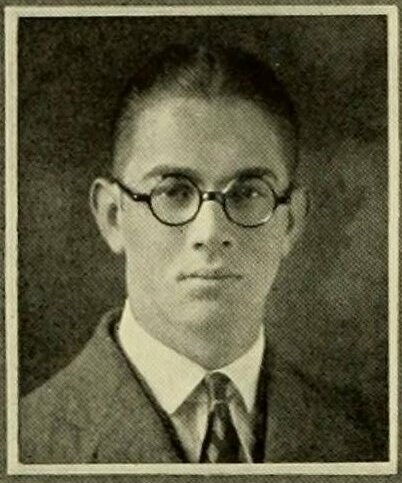
- 1924 yearbook photo
- Pitcher
- Born: January 20, 1907; Rockwell, North Carolina, U.S.
- Died: July 26, 1994 (aged 87); Concord, North Carolina, U.S.
- Batted: Right Threw: Right

MLB debut
- April 15, 1930, for the St. Louis Browns

Last MLB appearance
- September 16, 1930, for the St. Louis Browns

MLB statistics
- Win–loss record: 0–1
- Earned run average: 7.80
- Strikeouts: 37
- Stats at Baseball Reference

Teams
- St. Louis Browns (1930)

Herman Alexander Holshouser (January 20, 1907 – July 26, 1994) was an American professional baseball pitcher who appeared in 25 games, 24 of them in relief, in Major League Baseball as a member of the 1930 St. Louis Browns. Born in Rockwell, North Carolina, he attended the University of North Carolina at Chapel Hill.

== Career ==
Holshouser threw and batted right-handed, and was listed as 6 feet (1.83 m) tall and 170 pounds (77 kg). He began his nine-season pro career in 1926, and in his only big-league campaign, for the second-division Browns, Holshouser posted a 0–1 won–lost mark with one save, and a poor 7.80 earned run average. He allowed 103 hits and 28 bases on balls in 621/3 innings pitched, with 37 strikeouts.

He twice won over 20 games in minor league baseball, in 1928 and 1933. Holshouser retired after the 1934 season and died in Concord, North Carolina, at the age of 87.
