= Russ Young =

American baseball player (1902–1984)

- Catcher
- Born: September 15, 1902; Bryan, Ohio, U.S.
- Died: May 13, 1984 (aged 81); Roseville, California, U.S.
- Batted: Switch Threw: Right

MLB debut
- April 16, 1931, for the St. Louis Browns

Last MLB appearance
- July 27, 1931, for the St. Louis Browns

MLB statistics
- Batting average: .118
- Home runs: 1
- Runs batted in: 2
- Stats at Baseball Reference

Teams
- St. Louis Browns (1931)

Russell Charles Young (September 15, 1902 – May 13, 1984) was an American professional baseball catcher. He played part of one season in Major League Baseball for the St. Louis Browns in 1931. He was a switch hitter and threw right-handed. He was 6'0" and weighed 175 lbs. Young also played 4 games at fullback for the Dayton Triangles of the National Football League (NFL) in 1925.

Young had an extensive career in minor league baseball, spanning eighteen seasons from 1923-40. He played most of his career with the minor league Milwaukee Brewers, for whom he played in all but two seasons from 1923-34.
