= Ed Grimes =

American baseball player (1905-1974)

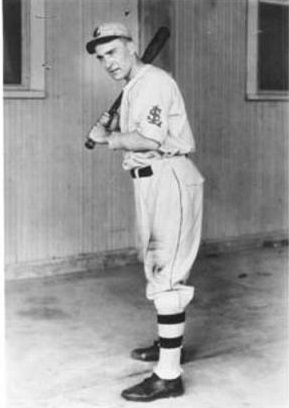
- Third baseman
- Born: September 8, 1905; Chicago
- Died: October 5, 1974 (aged 69); Chicago
- Batted: Right Threw: Right

MLB debut
- April 19, 1931, for the St. Louis Browns

Last MLB appearance
- September 17, 1932, for the St. Louis Browns

MLB statistics
- Batting average: .248
- Home runs: 0
- Runs batted in: 18
- Stats at Baseball Reference

Teams
- St. Louis Browns (1931–1932)

Edward Adelbert Grimes (September 8, 1905 – October 6, 1974) was a Major League Baseball third baseman who played with the St. Louis Browns in 1931 and 1932.
