= Wally Hebert =

American baseball player (1907–1999)

- Pitcher
- Born: August 21, 1907; Lake Charles, Louisiana, U.S.
- Died: December 8, 1999 (aged 92); Westlake, Louisiana, U.S.
- Batted: Left Threw: Left

MLB debut
- May 1, 1931, for the St. Louis Browns

Last MLB appearance
- September 29, 1943, for the Pittsburgh Pirates

MLB statistics
- Win–loss record: 21–36
- Earned run average: 4.63
- Strikeouts: 115
- Stats at Baseball Reference

Teams
- St. Louis Browns (1931–1933); Pittsburgh Pirates (1943)

Wallace Andrew Hebert (August 21, 1907 – December 8, 1999) was an American sidearming left-handed Major League Baseball starting pitcher who played from 1931 to 1933 for the St. Louis Browns and in 1943 for the Pittsburgh Pirates. His professional career began in 1930.

== Baseball career ==
Hebert played for the Springfield Midgets in 1930, going 15–16 in 36 games. He rose to the big leagues quickly, making his debut on May 1, 1931, with the Browns. That season, Hebert went 6–7 with a 5.07 ERA in 23 games (13 starts). In 103 innings, he walked 43 batters and struck out only 26.

In 1932, Hebert went 1–12 with a 6.48 ERA in 35 games (15 starts). In 108 1/3 innings, he had 29 strikeouts and 45 base on balls. After going 4–6 with a 5.30 ERA in 33 games (10 starts) in 1933, he was traded, with Smead Jolley and Jim Levey, to the Hollywood Stars of the Pacific Coast League for Alan Strange. He would spend about the next decade in the minor leagues.

In 1934 and 1935, Hebert pitched for the Hollywood Stars, going 11–11 with a 4.24 ERA in 37 games in 1934 and 10–17 with a 4.93 ERA in 39 games in 1935.

Hebert played for the San Diego Padres from 1936 to 1942. In his first year with the Padres, he made 35 appearances, and he went 18–12 with a 3.03 ERA. He posted a 17–14 record with a 3.02 ERA in 39 games in 1937, and in 1938 he went 12–16 with a 3.11 ERA in 37 games. For the first time in his professional career, he won 20 games in 1939, as he went 20–10 with a 3.13 ERA in 39 games. In 1940, he went 15–18 with a 3.92 ERA and in 1941, he went 22–10 with a 3.00 ERA.

After going 22–15 with a 2.37 in 40 games in 1942, Hebert was drafted by the Pittsburgh Pirates in the 1942 Rule 5 draft. With the Pirates in 1943, Hebert went 10–11 with a 2.98 ERA in 34 games (23 starts). In 184 innings, he had 12 complete games and he walked 45 batters, striking out only 41. He played his final big league game on September 29, 1943. Pittsburgh offered him a deal for the 1944 season, however he opted to retire.

Overall, Hebert went 21–36 with a 4.63 in 125 big league appearances (61 starts). In 483 2/3 innings, he had 168 walks and only 115 strikeouts. He was also a solid hitter, posting a .270 career batting average in 159 at-bats.

In the minor leagues, Hebert posted a 162–139 record, as well as a .239 batting average.

== Chapter 10 of The Walk West, A Walk Across America 2 ==
The book The Walk West, A Walk Across America 2 by Peter Jenkins and Barbara Jenkins tells the second part of the story of the authors' walking trip across the United States. In the 10th chapter, the hikers are traveling through Louisiana and stay for a few days with Wally Hebert and his wife Bobbie. Peter and Barbara Jenkins were friends with Wally Hebert, Jr. in New Orleans, and the younger Hebert suggested at the time that if they were ever passing through the town of Westlake, that they could find a place to stay with Preacher and Bobbie. The 10th chapter is entitled "Babe Ruth, Joe DiMaggio, and Preacher Hebert." In it, Hebert relates his experiences in major and minor league baseball, tells about his life growing up in the Louisiana swamps and bayous, discusses his football experiences, and gives a glimpse into his post baseball life as a farmer and as a fisher of the Louisiana waterways.

== The nickname ==
Hebert got the nickname "Preacher" in first grade when he wore a hat to school that his classmates thought was a preacher's hat. However, The Walk West, A Walk Across America 2 states otherwise. Hebert claims that he got his nickname from baseball, and remarks that his first nickname was "Mississippi Mudcat." However, as another player had that moniker, his teammates then changed the nickname to "Preacher" and he never could figure out why they chose it.
