= Bob Cooney =

American baseball player (1907-1976)

- Pitcher
- Born: July 12, 1907; Glens Falls, New York, U.S.
- Died: May 4, 1976 (aged 68); Glens Falls, New York, U.S.
- Batted: Right Threw: Right

MLB debut
- September 6, 1931, for the St. Louis Browns

Last MLB appearance
- September 23, 1932, for the St. Louis Browns

MLB statistics
- Win–loss record: 1–5
- Earned run average: 5.95
- Strikeouts: 36
- Stats at Baseball Reference

Teams
- St. Louis Browns (1931–1932)

Robert Daniel Cooney (July 12, 1907 – May 4, 1976) was an American professional baseball pitcher who played for the St. Louis Browns of Major League Baseball in 1931 and 1932.

Cooney attended St. Mary's Academy in Glens Falls, New York and then Fordham University, where he rose to prominence as a pitcher for the Rams baseball team.
