= Rollie Stiles =

American baseball player (1906-2007)

- Pitcher
- Born: November 17, 1906; Ratcliff, Arkansas, U.S.
- Died: July 22, 2007 (aged 100); St. Louis, Missouri, U.S.
- Batted: Right Threw: Right

MLB debut
- June 19, 1930, for the St. Louis Browns

Last MLB appearance
- October 1, 1933, for the St. Louis Browns

MLB statistics
- Record: 9-14
- ERA: 5.92
- Innings: 298
- Stats at Baseball Reference

Teams
- St. Louis Browns (1930–1933)

Rolland Mays Stiles (November 17, 1906 – July 22, 2007) was an American right-handed pitcher in Major League Baseball who played for the St. Louis Browns from 1930 to 1933. Born in Ratcliff, Arkansas, he batted and threw right-handed, and was 9–14 with an earned run average of 5.92 in his three seasons. Rollie attended Southeastern State Teachers College. His first game in the major leagues was on June 19, 1930, and his last game was October 1, 1933. Stiles' nicknames when playing baseball were "Leapin' Lena", "Lena", and "Rollie", all typical of how he signed autographs for baseball fans.

Stiles made an appearance and gave a speech at the St. Louis Browns Reunion dinner held at the Missouri Athletic Club on June 8, 2006, in St. Louis, Missouri. He died in his sleep at age 100 on July 22, 2007, at the Bethesda Southgate Nursing Home in St. Louis.

Stiles was the last living person to have pitched to Babe Ruth. While he was the oldest living major league ballplayer at the time of his death, Stiles was not the oldest living professional baseball player; that distinction was held by Emilio Navarro of the Negro leagues, who turned 103 years old in 2008.

== See also ==
- List of centenarians (Major League Baseball players)
- List of centenarians (sportspeople)

== Sources ==
Records
Preceded by Howdy Groskloss	Oldest recognized verified living baseball player July 15, 2006 – July 22, 2007	Succeeded by Billy Werber
