= Jack Crouch (baseball) =

American baseball player (1903–1972)

- Catcher
- Born: October 12, 1903; Cooleemee, North Carolina, U.S.
- Died: August 25, 1972 (aged 68); Leesburg, Florida, U.S.
- Batted: Right Threw: Right

MLB debut
- September 18, 1930, for the St. Louis Browns

Last MLB appearance
- October 1, 1933, for the Cincinnati Reds

MLB statistics
- Batting average: .125
- Home runs: 1
- Runs batted in: 8
- Stats at Baseball Reference

Teams
- St. Louis Browns (1930–1931, 1933); Cincinnati Reds (1933)

Jack Albert Crouch (October 12, 1903 – August 25, 1972) was an American Major League Baseball (MLB) catcher. He played for the St. Louis Browns in 1930, 1931, and 1933, and played for the Cincinnati Reds in 1933.

Crouch was the uncle of Chuck Scrivener, who played for the Detroit Tigers between 1975 and 1977.
