= Fred Stiely =

American baseball player (1901–1981)

- Pitcher
- Born: June 1, 1901; Pillow, Pennsylvania, U.S.
- Died: January 6, 1981 (aged 79); Valley View, Pennsylvania, U.S.
- Batted: Left Threw: Left

MLB debut
- October 6, 1929, for the St. Louis Browns

Last MLB appearance
- June 13, 1931, for the St. Louis Browns

MLB statistics
- Win–loss record: 1–1
- Earned run average: 5.97
- Strikeouts: 9
- Stats at Baseball Reference

Teams
- St. Louis Browns (1929–1931)

Fred Warren "Lefty" Stiely (June 1, 1901 – January 6, 1981) was an American Major League Baseball pitcher who played for the St. Louis Browns from 1929 to 1931.
