= Sam Gray (baseball) =

American baseball player

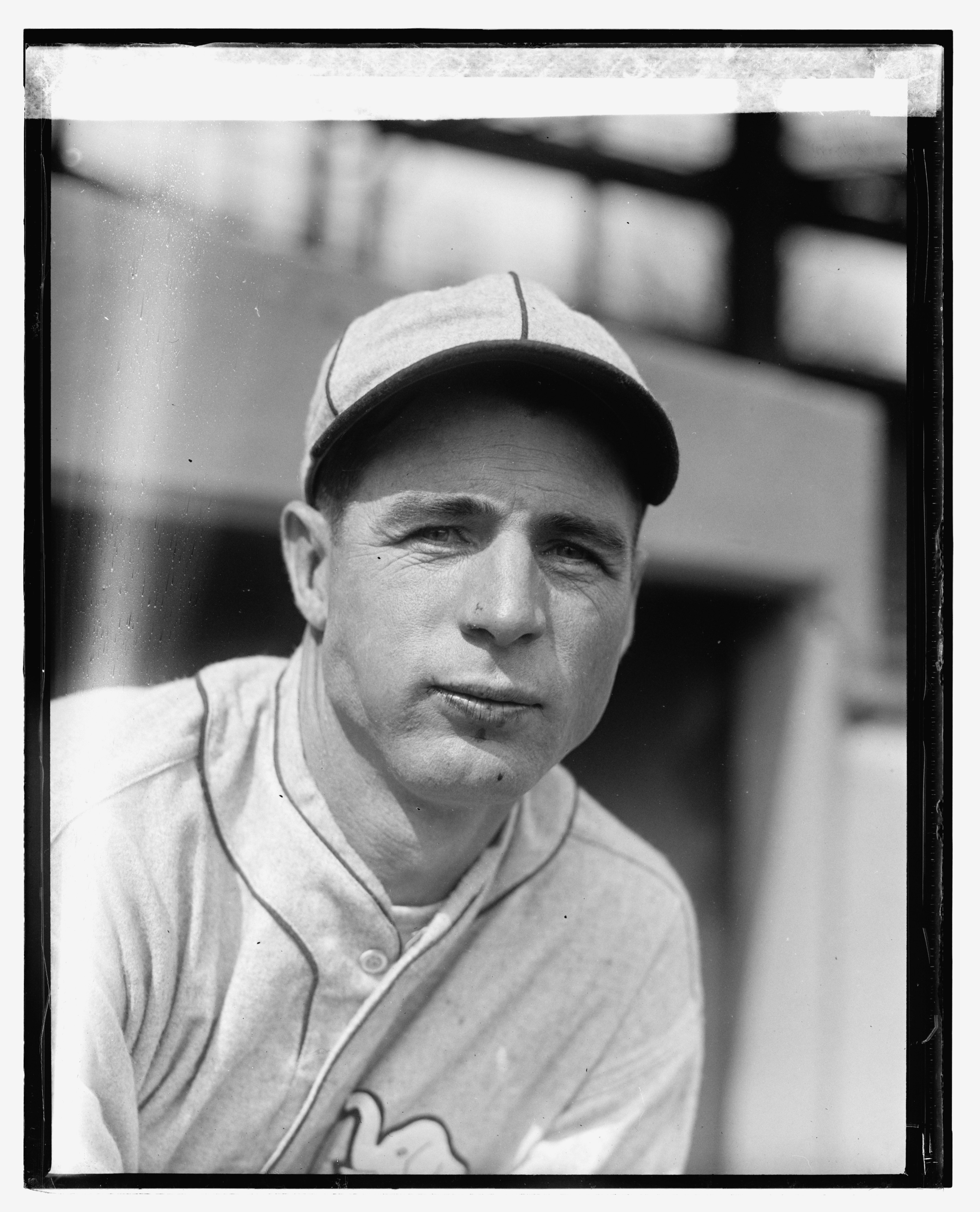
- Pitcher
- Born: October 15, 1897; Van Alstyne, Texas, U.S.
- Died: April 16, 1953 (aged 55); McKinney, Texas, U.S.
- Batted: Right Threw: Right

MLB debut
- April 19, 1924, for the Philadelphia Athletics

Last MLB appearance
- September 18, 1933, for the St. Louis Browns

MLB statistics
- Win–loss record: 111–115
- Earned run average: 4.18
- Strikeouts: 730
- Stats at Baseball Reference

Teams
- Philadelphia Athletics (1924–1927); St. Louis Browns (1928–1933)

Samuel David "Sad Sam" Gray (October 15, 1897 – April 16, 1953) was an American pitcher in Major League Baseball who played on the Philadelphia Athletics (1924–27) and the St. Louis Browns (1928–33). Gray pitched and batted right-handed.

He made his professional debut on April 19, 1924, for the Philadelphia Athletics under iconic manager Connie Mack. In his rookie season, he pitched 151 2/3 innings in 34 games. He was traded to the St. Louis Browns in 1928 and began pitching much more. His 1928 season was his finest year. He pitched 21 complete games with a win–loss record of 20–12. His earned run average that year was his lowest at 3.19. His 1929 season had similar numbers with an 18–15 record. He also led the league in games started (37) and innings pitched (305). He tied the American League lead in shutouts with four. He shared the league lead with George Blaeholder and General Crowder, who were teammates, as well as with Danny MacFayden of the Boston Red Sox.

In 1931, he had the dubious distinction of leading the league with 24 losses with a high 5.09 earned run average. His final game was on September 18, 1933. He retired with a win–loss record of 111–115, a 4.18 earned run average, 101 complete games in 379 games pitched, 16 shutouts, and 22 saves. As a batter, his statistics were relatively poor. He accumulated a .191 batting average in 648 at bats and hit two career home runs. He never appeared in any post-season games.

He died in McKinney, Texas, on April 16, 1953, at the age of 55.

== See also ==
- List of Major League Baseball annual shutout leaders
