= Lin Storti =

American baseball player (1906-1982)

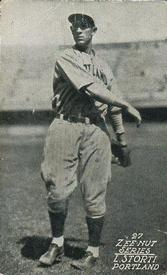
- Third baseman
- Born: December 5, 1906; Santa Monica, California, U.S.
- Died: July 25, 1982 (aged 75); Ontario, Canada, U.S.
- Batted: Both Threw: Right

MLB debut
- September 18, 1930, for the St. Louis Browns

Last MLB appearance
- September 30, 1933, for the St. Louis Browns

MLB statistics
- Batting average: .227
- Home runs: 9
- Runs batted in: 75
- Stats at Baseball Reference

Teams
- St. Louis Browns (1930–1933)

Lindo Ivan Storti (December 5, 1906 – July 24, 1982) was an American professional baseball player who appeared in 216 games as a third baseman, second baseman and pinch hitter in Major League Baseball for the St. Louis Browns from 1930 to 1933. Born in Santa Monica, California, Storti was a switch-hitter who threw right-handed; he was listed as 5 feet 11 inches (1.80 m) tall and 165 pounds (75 kg).

Storti batted only .227 with 160 hits during a lively-ball era in the majors, amassing 34 doubles, 11 triples, nine home runs, and 75 career runs batted in. He was a career backup infielder, whose personal best in games played came in 1931, with 86.

However, Storti had a 19-year professional career (1927–1945), including 12 seasons in the top-level American Association and lengthy service with Milwaukee, Minneapolis and Toledo.

He died in Ontario, California, aged 75.
