= Frank O'Rourke (baseball) =

Canadian baseball player (1893–1986)

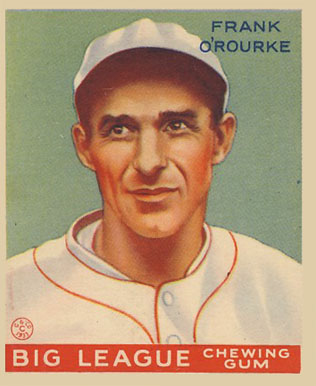
- Third baseman
- Born: November 28, 1893; Hamilton, Ontario, Canada
- Died: May 14, 1986 (aged 92); Chatham, New Jersey, U.S.
- Batted: Right Threw: Right

MLB debut
- June 11, 1912, for the Boston Braves

Last MLB appearance
- July 28, 1931, for the St. Louis Browns

MLB statistics
- Batting average: .254
- Home runs: 15
- Runs batted in: 430
- Stats at Baseball Reference

Teams
- Boston Braves (1912); Brooklyn Robins (1917–1918); Washington Senators (1920–1921); Boston Red Sox (1922); Detroit Tigers (1924–1925); St. Louis Browns (1927–1931)

Member of the Canadian

Baseball Hall of Fame
- Induction: 1996

James Francis O'Rourke (November 28, 1893 – May 14, 1986) was a Canadian professional baseball infielder. He played in Major League Baseball for the Boston Braves, Brooklyn Robins, Washington Senators, Boston Red Sox, Detroit Tigers, and St. Louis Browns between 1912 and 1931.

== Biography ==
O'Rourke was born in Hamilton, Ontario, Canada, and debuted as the third youngest player in the National League at 17 years age. His best season was 1925, when he batted .293 with 40 doubles, 5 home runs, and 57 RBI. In his career, he played at all four infield positions, primarily third base, where he had a .949 career fielding percentage in 598 games. O'Rourke was also a longtime New York Yankees scout.

In 1986, O'Rourke died at age 92 in Chatham, New Jersey. He was inducted posthumously into the Canadian Baseball Hall of Fame in 1996.
