= Earl McNeely =

American baseball player (1898-1971)

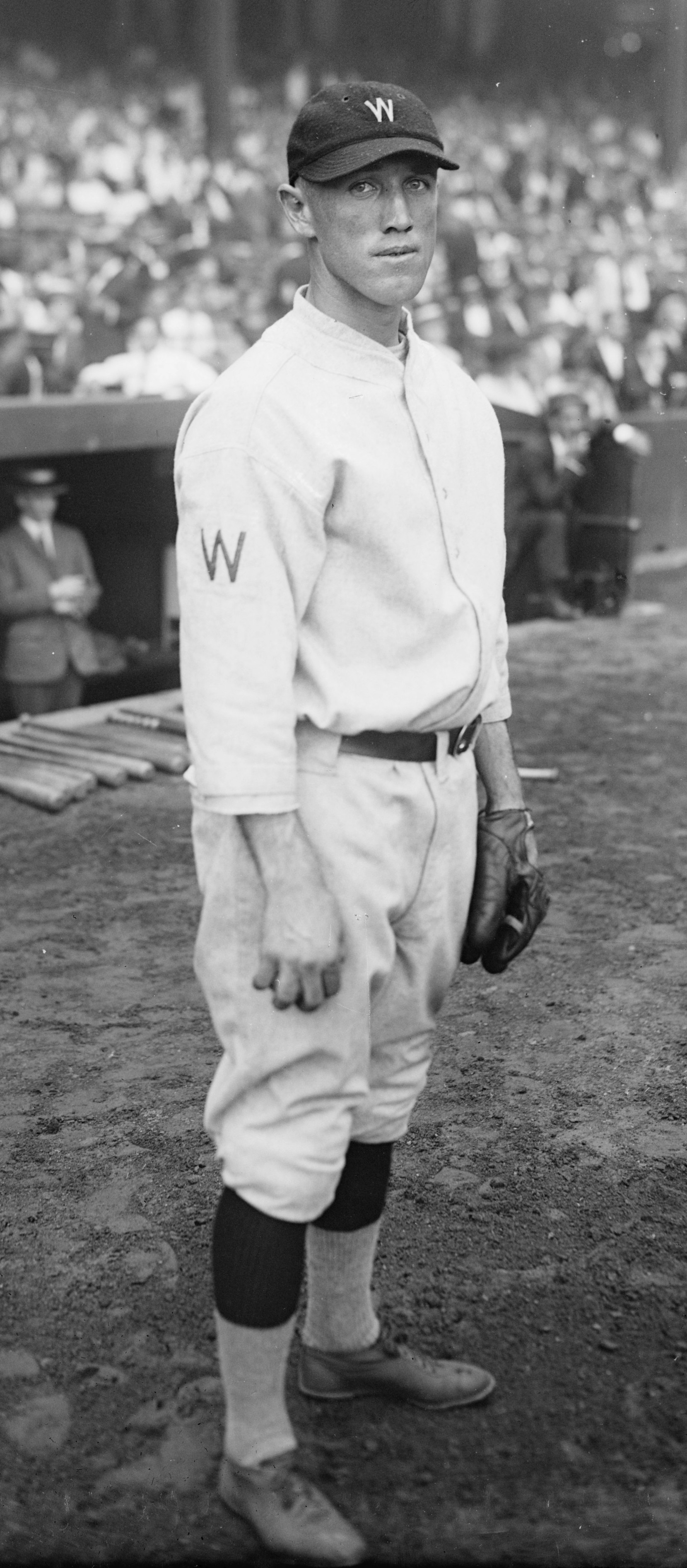
- McNeely in 1924
- Outfielder / Coach
- Born: May 12, 1898; Sacramento, California, U.S.
- Died: July 16, 1971 (aged 73); Sacramento, California, U.S.
- Batted: Right Threw: Right

MLB debut
- August 9, 1924, for the Washington Senators

Last MLB appearance
- September 26, 1931, for the St. Louis Browns

MLB statistics
- Batting average: .272
- Home runs: 4
- Runs batted in: 213
- Stats at Baseball Reference

Teams
- As player: Washington Senators (1924–1927); St. Louis Browns (1928–1931); As coach: St. Louis Browns (1931); Washington Senators (1936–1937)

Career highlights and awards
- World Series champion (1924)

George Earl McNeely (May 12, 1898 – July 16, 1971) was an American professional baseball outfielder and coach. He played in Major League Baseball for the Washington Senators from 1924 to 1927 and the St. Louis Browns from 1928 to 1931. McNeely threw and batted right-handed, and was listed as 5 feet 9 inches (1.75 m) tall and 155 pounds (70 kg). He was a lifelong resident of Sacramento, California.

In his eight-year major-league career, he compiled a .272 batting average (614 hits in 2254 at bats) with 369 runs scored, 4 home runs and 213 runs batted in during 683 games played. His on-base percentage was .335 and slugging percentage was .354. As a member of the 1924 Washington Senators, he played in that year's World Series and hit .222 (6-27) with four runs scored and one run batted in as the Senators defeated the New York Giants in seven games. McNeely's 12th-inning single in Game 7 delivered the winning blow as the American League franchise won its only World Series in Washington.

The next season he played in the 1925 World Series and appeared in four games as a pinch-runner, scoring two runs. The Senators lost in seven games to the Pirates.

At the end of his playing career, he was a player-manager for the Sacramento Senators of the Pacific Coast League from 1932 to 1935, also assuming ownership of the team during his final two seasons. He also was a coach for the Browns in 1931 and the Senators from 1936 to 1937.

After his baseball career ended, he worked in the farming and cattle industries until his retirement in 1959. He died on July 16, 1971 following a long illness.
