= Larry Bettencourt =

American football and baseball player (1905–1978)

Profile
- Positions: Center, end

Personal information
- Born: September 22, 1905; Newark, California, U.S.
- Died: September 15, 1978 (aged 72); New Orleans, Louisiana, U.S.
- Listed height: 5 ft 7 in (1.70 m)
- Listed weight: 187 lb (85 kg)

Career information
- College: Saint Mary's

Career history
- Green Bay Packers (1933)

Awards and highlights
- Consensus All-American (1927); Third-team All-American (1926); 3× First-team All-PCC (1925, 1926, 1927); Baseball career
- Third base / Outfield
- Batted: Right Threw: Right

MLB debut
- June 2, 1928, for the St. Louis Browns

Last MLB appearance
- September 17, 1932, for the St. Louis Browns

MLB statistics
- Batting average: .258
- On-base plus slugging: .360
- Stats at Baseball Reference

Teams
- St. Louis Browns (1928 – 1932)
- College Football Hall of Fame

Lawrence Joseph Bettencourt (September 22, 1905 – September 15, 1978) was an American football and baseball player. He played professionally in Major League Baseball (MLB) as an outfielder and third baseman for the St. Louis Browns and in the National Football League (NFL) as a center for the Green Bay Packers.

A member of the College Football Hall of Fame, Bettencourt helped lift Saint Mary's College of California, a small college located in Moraga, California to national prominence. On the defensive side of the ball, Bettencourt became an expert at rushing the punter. During his four-year varsity career, he scored 12 touchdowns, most of them on blocked kicks. As a senior in 1927, he blocked punts in six consecutive games. His offensive play helped gain him All-American honors. During his four years St. Mary's, the school posted a 33–5–2 record.

After graduation, he signed a baseball contract with the St. Louis Browns for $6,000, which was then the largest bonus ever paid a rookie just out of school. In 1933, he played in the NFL for the Green Bay Packers.

In 168 major league games over three seasons (1928, 1931–32), Bettencourt posted a .258 batting average (102-for-395) with 61 runs, 8 home runs, 53 RBIs and 60 walks.
