= Red Kress =

American baseball player (1905–1962)

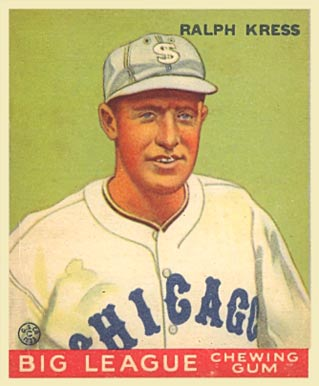
- Shortstop / Third baseman / First baseman
- Born: January 2, 1905; Columbia, California, U.S.
- Died: November 29, 1962 (aged 57); Los Angeles, California, U.S.
- Batted: Right Threw: Right

MLB debut
- September 24, 1927, for the St. Louis Browns

Last MLB appearance
- July 17, 1946, for the New York Giants

MLB statistics
- Batting average: .286
- Home runs: 89
- Runs batted in: 799
- Stats at Baseball Reference

Teams
- St. Louis Browns (1927–1932); Chicago White Sox (1932–1934); Washington Senators (1934–1936); St. Louis Browns (1938–1939); Detroit Tigers (1939–1940); New York Giants (1946)

Ralph "Red" Kress (January 2, 1905 – November 29, 1962) was an American professional baseball shortstop, third baseman, first baseman and coach in Major League Baseball (MLB). From 1927 through 1946, he played for the St. Louis Browns (1927–1932; 1938–1939), Chicago White Sox (1932–1934), Washington Senators (1934–1936), Detroit Tigers (1939–1940) and New York Giants (1946). Kress batted and threw right-handed. He was born in Columbia, California.

== Playing career ==
Throughout his Major League career, Kress was known for his good disposition and perpetual motion. Although he played mostly at shortstop, he showed his versatility playing every position but catcher and center fielder. Kress broke in the majors with the Browns in the 1927 season. In 1929 he led American League shortstops in fielding percentage (.946) and double plays (94), and during three consecutive seasons he batted over .300 with over 100 runs batted in: .305 with 107 in 1929, .313 with 112 in 1930, and .311 with 114 in 1931, including a 22-game hitting-streak in 1930.

Despite his efforts, in 1932 he was traded by St. Louis to the White Sox. The White Sox had Luke Appling at shortstop, so Kress assumed a role as a utilityman. In the 1934 midseason, he was sent by Chicago to the Washington Senators, who had manager Joe Cronin at shortstop. Kress played seven positions until Bucky Harris released him in 1936.

Kress spent 1937 with the Minneapolis Millers of the American Association, hitting .330 and leading the league shortstops in total chances. He was reacquired by the Browns along with Bobo Newsom and Buster Mills from the Boston Red Sox, the Millers' parent club, for Joe Vosmik on December 3, 1937. Again at shortstop, he responded with a .302 average and leading American League shortstops in fielding (.965). Traded to the Detroit Tigers in 1939, he broke his leg during the season. In 1940, the American League champion Tigers released the hard-luck Kress on August 1, but he remained with Detroit as a coach through the World Series, then in 1941 continued his career in the American Association as player-manager of the St. Paul Saints of the American Association.

During his minor league days with the Toronto Maple Leafs, Kress played a nine-inning game at nine positions. While playing against the Montreal Royals in 1945, he pitched a no-hit, no run game for eight and one-third innings. He lost in the ninth, 1–0, on a hit, walk, and error.

In 1946, Kress returned to the Majors when he signed with the New York Giants under manager Mel Ott as a player-coach. It was his last year as an active player. In a 14-season MLB career, Kress was a .286 hitter with 1,454 hits, 298 doubles, 58 triples, 89 home runs, 691 runs, 799 RBI, 47 stolen bases, and 474 walks in 1,391 games played.

As a shortstop, Kress recorded a .944 fielding percentage, 1,761 putouts, 2,357 assists, 243 errors in 4,361 chances, and 558 double plays. In all positions, he recorded a .953 fielding percentage.

== Coaching career ==
Kress continued as a full-time Giants' coach under Ott and Leo Durocher through 1949. He was a member of the Cleveland Indians' coaching staff for eight years (1953–1960), and the Los Angeles Angels in their maiden season (1961). In addition to the Saints, he managed minor league clubs the Sacramento Solons and Indios de Ciudad Juárez.

Kress returned to New York City, this time to coach for the first-year 1962 Mets under Casey Stengel. The team lost 120 games, the most defeats by a Major League team in a single season since the 19th century. Almost two months after the season was over, Kress died from a heart attack in Los Angeles, at 57 years old.
