= Jim Levey =

American baseball player (1906–1970)

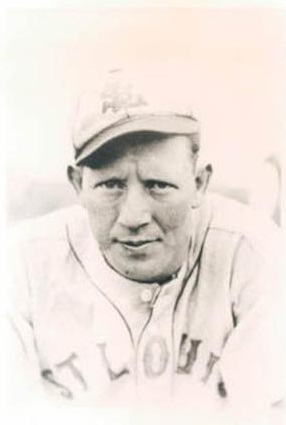
- Levey with the St. Louis Browns
- Shortstop
- Born: September 13, 1906; Pittsburgh, Pennsylvania, U.S.
- Died: March 14, 1970 (aged 63); Dallas, Texas, U.S.
- Batted: Both Threw: Right

MLB debut
- September 17, 1930, for the St. Louis Browns

Last MLB appearance
- October 1, 1933, for the St. Louis Browns

MLB statistics
- Batting average: .230
- Home runs: 11
- RBI: 140
- Stats at Baseball Reference

Teams
- St. Louis Browns (1930–1933)

James Julius Levey (September 13, 1906 – March 14, 1970) was an American Major League Baseball shortstop who played from 1930 to 1933 for the St. Louis Browns. His professional career began in 1927. He also was a halfback for the Pittsburgh Pirates of the National Football League (NFL) from 1934 to 1936.

According to FanGraphs, Levey posted a career Wins Above Replacement of -8.0, and owns the record for lowest WAR since in a single season since 1901 for a position player, posting a -4.0 mark in 1933. Levey also owns the fourth-worst season, recording -3.3 WAR in 1931.

== Early life ==
Levey served six years in the United States Marine Corps, playing halfback on the Quantico Marines Devil Dogs football team. He was honorably discharged in 1929 at the rank of sergeant.

== Baseball career ==
=== Minor leagues ===
Levey was granted a leave of absence from the Marine Corps to play for the Salisbury Indians in 1927, hitting .252 in 143 at-bats. In 1929, he played for the Tulsa Oilers, hitting .287 in 334 at-bats. For the Wichita Falls Spudders in 1930, he hit .289 with 16 home runs in 662 at-bats. He made his big league debut that season, on September 17, and with the Browns he hit .243 in 37 at-bats.

=== St. Louis Browns ===
Levey was the Browns' starting shortstop from 1931 to 1933. In 1931, he hit .209 with 13 stolen bases (10th in the American League) in 139 games. He had perhaps his best offensive season in 1932, hitting .280 with 30 doubles and eight triples in 152 games, and came in 19th in the National League MVP voting. In 1933, he hit only .195 in 529 at-bats, posting an OPS of only .477, and a season WAR of -4.0, the lowest single season performance by a position player since 1901. He also had defensive difficulties, posting a Fielding Runs Above Average of -22. On October 1, 1933, he appeared in his final big league game.

Overall, Levey hit .230 with 11 home runs, 23 stolen bases, 162 runs and 140 RBI in 440 big league games. He walked 85 times, struck out 201 times and posted an on-base percentage of .272, as well as a slugging percentage of .305.

According to FanGraphs, Levey posted a career Wins Above Replacement (WAR) of -8.0. By WAR, he owns the first and fourth worst single seasons by a position player since 1901, posting -4.0 in 1933 and -3.3 in 1931.

=== Return to the minors ===
Although his big league career was done after the 1933 season, he played professionally in the minor leagues until 1945. On December 13, 1933, he was traded with Wally Hebert and Smead Jolley to the Hollywood Stars of the Pacific Coast League for Alan Strange. He played for the Stars in 1934 and 1935, hitting .256 in 718 at-bats in the former year and .278 in 532 at-bats in the latter. In 1936, he played for the Oilers and Dallas Steers hitting a combined .252 in 587 at-bats.

From 1937 to 1940, he played for the Dallas Steers and Dallas Rebels. He hit only .226 in 1937, and in limited time in 1938 (93 games) he hit .233. 1939 was an improvement, as he hit .272 with 14 home runs and 33 doubles in 142 games. He hit .253 in 137 games in 1940.

In 1941 and 1942, Levey played for the Buffalo Bisons, hitting .194 in 1941 and .251 in 1942. He did not play in 1943, serving in the United States Army, but returned to Buffalo in 1944, hitting .200 in 200 at-bats. 1945 was his final professional season, and arguably one of his best – he hit a career-high .302 in 348 at-bats for the Jamestown Falcons.

In the minors, Levey hit .256 in 1,699 games. He managed Dallas in 1938 and Jamestown in 1945, leading the Falcons to a 75–51 records.

== Football career ==
Levey played in parts of three NFL seasons with the Pittsburgh Pirates. In 1934, he made nine attempts and gained 69 yards, averaging 7.7 yards per attempt. He rushed the ball 42 times in 1935, averaging only 1.5 yards a rush, gaining 61 yards. He did score two touchdowns in 1935, and he scored two more as a receiver, as he caught seven passes for 112 yards. 1936 was his final year with the Pirates, as he played in four games and rushed the ball four times, gaining three yards for a 0.8 average.

Overall, Levey played in 13 NFL games, rushing the ball 55 times and gaining 133 yards, scoring two touchdowns and averaging 2.4 yards per attempt.

== Personal life and death ==
Levey was Jewish. He died from cancer at the age of 63 and is interred at Restland Memorial Park in Dallas.
