= Fred Schulte =

American baseball player (1901–1983)

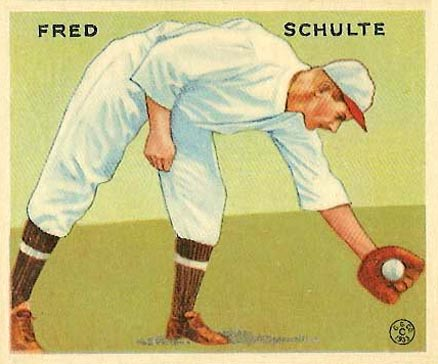
- Schulte with the Washington Senators in 1933
- Center fielder
- Born: January 13, 1901; Belvidere, Illinois
- Died: May 20, 1983 (aged 82); Belvidere, Illinois
- Batted: Right Threw: Right

MLB debut
- April 15, 1927, for the St. Louis Browns

Last MLB appearance
- October 3, 1937, for the Pittsburgh Pirates

MLB statistics
- Batting average: .291
- Home runs: 47
- Runs batted in: 593
- Stats at Baseball Reference

Teams
- St. Louis Browns (1927–1932); Washington Senators (1933–1935); Pittsburgh Pirates (1936–1937)

Fred William "Fritz" Schulte (January 13, 1901 – May 20, 1983) was a professional baseball center fielder who played in Major League Baseball (MLB) for the St. Louis Browns, Washington Senators, and Pittsburgh Pirates. Schulte batted and threw right-handed. He was born in Belvidere, Illinois.

Over eleven seasons, Schulte posted a .291 batting average (1241-for-4259) with 47 home runs and 593 RBI in 1179 games played.

Schulte joined the St. Louis Browns in 1927 and hit .317 in 60 games before an injury sidelined him for the rest of the season. He hit .307 in 1919, and .304 in 1931, before being traded by St. Louis to the Washington Senators late in 1932.

In 1933, Schulte hit .295 and scored 96 runs for the American League champion Senators, then led the team with a .333 average and four RBI in the World Series, which the New York Giants won in five games.

The Pittsburgh Pirates acquired Schulte off waivers before the 1936 season, and he played sparingly for them until 1937. After being released by Pittsburgh, he managed and coached in the minor leagues until 1946. He also served as a scout for the Reds, White Sox, Indians, and Braves between 1947 and 1964.

Schulte died in his hometown of Belvidere, Illinois, at age 82.
