= Ski Melillo =

American baseball player and manager (1899–1963)

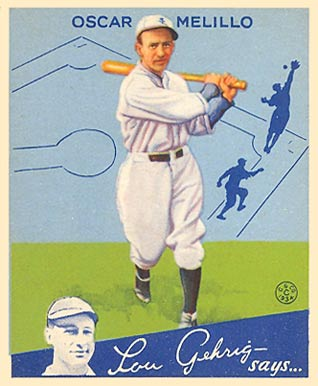
- Second baseman / Manager
- Born: August 4, 1899; Chicago, Illinois, U.S.
- Died: November 14, 1963 (aged 64); Chicago, Illinois, U.S.
- Batted: Right Threw: Right

MLB debut
- April 18, 1926, for the St. Louis Browns

Last MLB appearance
- September 18, 1937, for the Boston Red Sox

MLB statistics
- Batting average: .260
- Home runs: 22
- Runs batted in: 547
- Stats at Baseball Reference

Teams
- As player: St. Louis Browns (1926–1935); Boston Red Sox (1935–1937); As manager: St. Louis Browns (1938)

Oscar Donald "Ski" Melillo (August 4, 1899 – November 14, 1963) was an American second baseman and coach in Major League Baseball. He briefly served as manager of the St. Louis Browns in 1938 and was also a member of the coaching staff for the Cleveland Indians' 1948 World Series championship team. In a 12-season career, Melillo was a .260 hitter (1,316-for-5,063) with 22 home runs and 548 RBI in 1,377 games, including 590 runs, 210 doubles, 64 triples, and 69 stolen bases.

== Career ==
A native of Chicago, Melillo reached the majors in 1926 with the Browns, spending nine and a half years with them before moving to the Boston Red Sox (1935–37). Basically a line-drive hitter, he enjoyed a good year in 1929 ending with a .296 batting average in 141 games, hitting for the cycle on May 23. His most productive season came in 1931, when he hit .306 with five home runs, 88 runs, 189 hits, 34 doubles and 11 triples, all career numbers, while adding 75 runs batted in, a significant offensive contribution for a middle infielder of his era.

As a second baseman, in 1930 Melillo handled 971 chances without committing an error (17 fewer that Nap Lajoie's 1908 MLB record). In 1933, he hit .292 with a career-high 79 RBI and posted a .991 fielding average that stood for more than 10 years.

Following his playing retirement, Melillo became a coach for the Browns in 1938. That season, he received his only chance to manage at the Major League level when he became a late-season replacement for Gabby Street. Melillo finished with a 2–7 mark (.222) as the Browns lost 97 games and placed seventh in the eight-team American League. He later served as a coach for the Indians under Oscar Vitt and Lou Boudreau (1939–40; 1942; 1945–48; 1950). After the 1947 season, he was dropped from Boudreau's coaching staff at the insistence of owner Bill Veeck. Melillo spent part of 1948 managing in the Indians' farm system, but returned to Cleveland to serve part of the year as an aide to Boudreau for the 1948 world champions. After spending the 1949 season as a minor league manager, he coached under Boudreau in 1950, his final year with the Indians, then again with the Red Sox (1952–53) and Kansas City Athletics (1955–56).

== Managerial record ==
Team	Year	Regular season					Postseason			
Team	Year	Games	Won	Lost	Win %	Finish	Won	Lost	Win %	Result
SLB	1938	9	2	7	.222	7th in AL	–	–	–	–
Total		9	2	7	.222		0	0	–	

== Personal life ==
Melillo's grave at Holy Sepulchre Cemetery

Melillo was nicknamed "Ski" and "Spinach". In 1926, Melillo suffered from Bright's disease. Melillo's doctor prescribed him a diet of spinach as a result. He also suffered from zoophobia, a generic term for the class of specific phobias to particular animals, including rabbits, birds and snakes. His animal phobia led to many pranks from both opposing players and teammates.

Melillo died of a heart attack at his home in Chicago on November 14, 1963, at the age of 64. He was buried at Holy Sepulchre Cemetery in Alsip.

== See also ==
- List of Major League Baseball players to hit for the cycle

Achievements
Preceded by Mel Ott	Hitting for the cycle May 23, 1929	Succeeded by Joe Cronin
Sporting positions
Preceded by Eddie Mayo	Boston Red Sox third-base coach 1952–1953	Succeeded by Buster Mills
