= France Laux =

American sports announcer

- Born: James Francis Laux Jr. December 3, 1897; Guthrie, Oklahoma, U.S.
- Died: November 16, 1978 (aged 80); Eureka, Missouri, U.S.
- Sports commentary career
- Team(s): St. Louis Cardinals; St. Louis Browns
- Genre: Play-by-play
- Sport: Major League Baseball

James Francis "France" Laux Jr. (December 3, 1897 – November 16, 1978) was an American sportscaster, notable as the first full-time radio voice of Major League Baseball in St. Louis.

== Biography ==
=== Early life ===
Laux was born in Guthrie, Oklahoma, the son of a local judge, J. Francis Laux Sr., and his wife. The nickname "France" came from schoolmates. Heavily involved in sports, Laux won 16 letters in baseball, basketball, and football in Oklahoma City and Bristow schools before entering Oklahoma City College.

He served in the Army Air Service during World War I; after the war, his jobs included managing a semi-pro baseball team in Guthrie, Oklahoma. He also worked as an insurance and real estate broker in Bristow (a suburb of Tulsa), refereeing college football games part-time.

On the eve of the 1927 World Series, KVOO station manager Fred Yates did not have anyone to recreate the games. Someone mentioned Laux' name. Yates found him and took him to the studio. Later in the year, he began broadcasting Oklahoma and Oklahoma A&M football games as well. He was the first to introduce Gene Autry on the radio.

=== Career in St. Louis ===
Laux' work soon came to the attention of the management at KMOX in St. Louis, who invited him there for a 30-day trial as the voice of both the Cardinals and Browns in 1929. This arrangement was possible because the Cardinals and Browns shared Sportsman's Park, and almost never played on the same day. As it turned out, 30 days became 24 years.

Laux became very popular, in large part because, at the time, the Cardinals were the southernmost and westernmost team in Major League Baseball. As such, their radio network blanketed large chunks of the Midwest and Southwest. Also, KMOX was a 50,000-watt clear channel powerhouse, with virtual coast-to-coast coverage at night.

A 1936 newspaper article about Laux noted that his work at KMOX included "broadcasting all baseball, football, hockey, boxing, wrestling, basketball and horse races besides carrying on his regular duties as chief announcer." In addition to broadcasting live sporting events, Laux had his own daily 15-minute program on KMOX in the late 1930s. In the 1940s he wrote the Hyde Park Sports Letter, a four-page publication that highlighted national and St. Louis sports.

Laux was the voice of both the Cardinals and Browns until 1942. He broadcast solely for the Cardinals in 1943. After only one season, he stepped down, but returned in 1948 as the voice of the Browns. He went into semi-retirement after that season, but called weekend games until the end of the 1953 season, the Browns' last in St. Louis. In the late 1950s he and Jack Buck hosted a program called Batting Practice, which served as a pre-game show for telecasts of Cardinals road games on KTVI-TV.

==== Career at CBS and Mutual ====
His popularity soon gained Laux notice with CBS, which had bought KMOX shortly after the start of the 1929 season. He called the World Series for CBS from 1933 to 1938, and the first eight All-Star Games from 1933 to 1941, the last three of those for Mutual. He turned down offers to broadcast for the Yankees and Giants in New York, preferring to stay in St. Louis, where he had a huge following. He won the first Sporting News Announcer of the Year Award in 1937.

=== Later life ===
After 1953, Laux turned his attention to a bowling house he bought in St. Louis after the war. He also served as secretary of the American Bowling Congress for many years.

== Family ==
On December 3, 1928, Laux married Pearl Genevieve Boyer (1900–1976), a professional singer. Laux had two sons with Boyer, France Albert Laux (1929–2012) and Roger Harry Laux (1930–1981). His remains are interred, with those of his wife Pearl, in Calvary Cemetery, Edwardsville, Illinois.

== External Sources ==
- France Laux at SABR Bio Project
