= Tom Jenkins (baseball) =

American baseball player (1898–1979)

- Outfielder
- Born: April 10, 1898; Camden, Alabama
- Died: May 3, 1979 (aged 81); Weymouth, Massachusetts
- Batted: Left Threw: Right

MLB debut
- September 15, 1925, for the Boston Red Sox

Last MLB appearance
- June 26, 1932, for the St. Louis Browns

MLB statistics
- Batting average: .259
- Home runs: 3
- Runs batted in: 44
- Stats at Baseball Reference

Teams
- Boston Red Sox (1925–1926); Philadelphia Athletics (1926); St. Louis Browns (1929–1932)

Thomas Griffith Jenkins [Tut] (April 10, 1898 – May 3, 1979) was a reserve outfielder in Major League Baseball who played for the Boston Red Sox (1925–1926), Philadelphia Athletics (1926) and St. Louis Browns (1929–1932). Jenkins batted left-handed and threw right-handed. He was born in Camden, Alabama.

In a six-season career, Jenkins was a .259 hitter (119-for-459) with three home runs and 44 RBI in 171 games, including 42 runs, 14 doubles, six triples, and one stolen base. He made 109 outfield appearances at right field (75), left (32) and center (2).

Jenkins died in Weymouth, Massachusetts, at age 81.

== Sources ==
- Career statistics from Baseball Reference · Baseball Reference (Minors) · Retrosheet · Baseball Almanac
- Retrosheet
