= Lefty Stewart =

American baseball player (1900–1974)

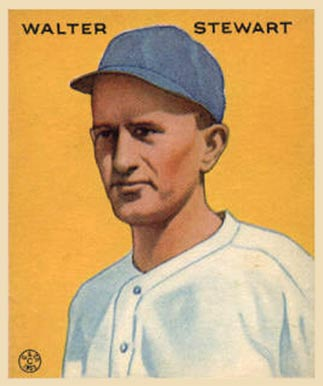
- Pitcher
- Born: September 23, 1900; Sparta, Tennessee, U.S.
- Died: September 26, 1974 (aged 74); Knoxville, Tennessee, U.S.
- Batted: Right Threw: Left

MLB debut
- April 20, 1921, for the Detroit Tigers

Last MLB appearance
- September 29, 1935, for the Cleveland Indians

MLB statistics
- Win–loss record: 101–98
- Earned run average: 4.19
- Strikeouts: 503
- Stats at Baseball Reference

Teams
- Detroit Tigers (1921); St. Louis Browns (1927–1932); Washington Senators (1933–1935); Cleveland Indians (1935)

Walter Cleveland "Lefty" Stewart (September 23, 1900 – September 26, 1974) was an American professional baseball pitcher. He played all or part of ten seasons in Major League Baseball between 1921 and 1935. He played for the Detroit Tigers, St. Louis Browns, Washington Senators, and Cleveland Indians.

Stewart gave up one of Babe Ruth's record-setting 60 home runs during the 1927 season.

Stewart was a better than average hitting pitcher in his major league career. In 279 games, he posted a .204 batting average (115-for-565) with 60 runs, 48 RBI and drawing 64 bases on balls. Defensively, he was above average, recording a .973 fielding percentage which was 18 points higher than the league average during his career.
