= George Blaeholder =

American baseball player (1904–1947)

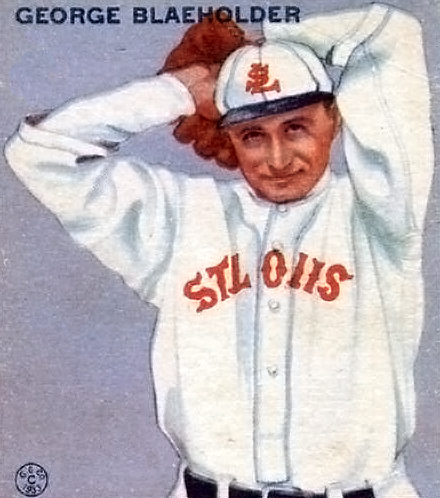
- Blaeholder's 1933 baseball card from the Goudey Gum Company
- Pitcher
- Born: January 26, 1904; Orange, California, U.S.
- Died: December 29, 1947 (aged 43); Garden Grove, California, U.S.
- Batted: Right Threw: Right

MLB debut
- April 20, 1925, for the St. Louis Browns

Last MLB appearance
- September 22, 1936, for the Cleveland Indians

MLB statistics
- Win–loss record: 104–125
- Earned run average: 4.54
- Strikeouts: 572
- Stats at Baseball Reference

Teams
- St. Louis Browns (1925, 1927–1935); Philadelphia Athletics (1935); Cleveland Indians (1936)

George Franklin Blaeholder (January 26, 1904 – December 29, 1947) was an American pitcher in Major League Baseball.

Blaeholder began his career in 1925 with the St. Louis Browns, but he pitched in just two innings that season. Back in the minors in 1926, he returned to the majors with the Browns in 1927, where he again saw limited duty, pitching only 9 innings. He spent most of the prior four seasons with the Tulsa Oilers. In 1928, he became a regular full-time pitcher, posting a 10–15 record and a 4.04 ERA in 214 innings. In 1929, Blaeholder posted arguably his best season, going 14–15 with a 4.18 earned run average and four shutouts. He won 10 or more games in 7 seasons with the Browns, but the Browns were a perennial losing team, and Blaeholder had only one non-losing season with the Browns (in 1932 when he went 14–14). During the 1935 season, he was traded to the Philadelphia Athletics for Sugar Cain and Ed Coleman. He went 6-10 for the Athletics that year. The following year, he played his final season with the Cleveland Indians, where he went 8–4, the only winning season of his career. After leaving the major leagues, Blaeholder spent the next six seasons with the minor league Milwaukee Brewers before retiring. He died shortly thereafter of liver cancer at age 43. Blaeholder was married to his wife, Vera, from 1924 until his death. The Blaeholders had no children.

Blaeholder popularized the slider pitch. Pitchers had previously used the pitch, but not nearly as extensively as Blaeholder threw it, as the pitch was considered by pitchers at the time to ruin the arm.
