= Chad Kimsey =

American baseball player (1906–1942)

- Pitcher
- Born: August 6, 1906; Copperhill, Tennessee, U.S.
- Died: December 3, 1942 (aged 36); Pryor, Oklahoma, U.S.
- Batted: Left Threw: Right

MLB debut
- April 21, 1929, for the St. Louis Browns

Last MLB appearance
- July 29, 1936, for the Detroit Tigers

MLB statistics
- Win–loss record: 24–29
- Earned run average: 5.07
- Strikeouts: 121
- Stats at Baseball Reference

Teams
- St. Louis Browns (1929–1932); Chicago White Sox (1932–1933); Detroit Tigers (1936)

Clyde Elias "Chad" Kimsey (August 6, 1906 – December 3, 1942) was an American professional baseball pitcher in Major League Baseball. He played all or part of six seasons in the majors, between 1929 and 1936, for the St. Louis Browns, Chicago White Sox, and Detroit Tigers. He was killed in a truck accident at age 36.

Kimsey was a strong hitting pitcher in his major league career. He posted a .282 batting average (58-for-206) with 30 runs, 6 home runs and 26 RBI in 227 games. He was used as a pinch hitter 43 times in the major leagues. He made 26 pinch hitting appearances for the 1930 St. Louis Browns.
