= 1993 in baseball =

The following are the baseball events of the year 1993 throughout the world.

== Champions ==
=== Major League Baseball ===
- World Series: Toronto Blue Jays over Philadelphia Phillies (4–2); Paul Molitor, MVP

League Championship Series (ALCS, NLCS)
East	Toronto	4
West	Chicago White Sox	2
East	Philadelphia	4
West	Atlanta	2

World Series
AL	Toronto	4
NL	Philadelphia	2

- American League Championship Series MVP: Dave Stewart
- National League Championship Series MVP: Curt Schilling
- All-Star Game, July 13 at Oriole Park at Camden Yards: American League, 9–3; Kirby Puckett, MVP

=== Other champions ===
- Caribbean World Series: Cangrejeros de Santurce (Puerto Rico)
- College World Series: LSU
- Cuban National Series: Villa Clara over Pinar del Río
- Japan Series: Yakult Swallows over Seibu Lions (4–3)
- Korean Series: Haitai Tigers over Samsung Lions
- Big League World Series: Taipei, Taiwan
- Junior League World Series: Cayey, Puerto Rico
- Little League World Series: Long Beach, California
- Senior League World Series: La Vega, Dominican Republic
- Taiwan Series: Brother Elephants over Uni-President Lions

== Awards and honors ==
- Baseball Hall of Fame
  - Reggie Jackson
- Most Valuable Player
  - Frank Thomas, Chicago White Sox (AL)
  - Barry Bonds, San Francisco Giants (NL)
- Cy Young Award
  - Jack McDowell, Chicago White Sox (AL)
  - Greg Maddux, Atlanta Braves (NL)
- Rookie of the Year
  - Tim Salmon, California Angels (AL)
  - Mike Piazza, Los Angeles Dodgers (NL)
- Manager of the Year Award
  - Gene Lamont, Chicago White Sox (AL)
  - Dusty Baker, San Francisco Giants (NL)
- Woman Executive of the Year (major or minor league): Shereen Samonds, Orlando Cubs, Southern League
- Gold Glove Award
  - Don Mattingly (1B) (AL)
  - Roberto Alomar (2B) (AL)
  - Robin Ventura (3B) (AL)
  - Omar Vizquel (SS) (AL)
  - Ken Griffey Jr. (OF) (AL)
  - Kenny Lofton (OF) (AL)
  - Devon White (OF) (AL)
  - Iván Rodríguez (C) (AL)
  - Mark Langston (P) (AL)
  - Mark Grace (1B) (NL)
  - Robby Thompson (2B) (NL)
  - Matt Williams (3B) (NL)
  - Jay Bell (SS) (NL)
  - Barry Bonds (OF) (NL)
  - Marquis Grissom (OF) (NL)
  - Larry Walker (OF) (NL)
  - Kirt Manwaring (C) (NL)
  - Greg Maddux (P) (NL)

== MLB statistical leaders ==
	American League		National League
Type	Name	Stat	Name	Stat
AVG	John Olerud TOR	.363	Andrés Galarraga COL	.370
HR	Juan González TEX	46	Barry Bonds SF	46
RBI	Albert Belle CLE	129	Barry Bonds SF	123
Wins	Jack McDowell CWS	22	John Burkett SF; Tom Glavine ATL	22
ERA	Kevin Appier KC	2.56	Greg Maddux ATL	2.36

== Major league Baseball final standings ==
American League
Rank	Club	Wins	Losses	Win %	GB
East Division
1st	Toronto Blue Jays	95	67	.586	--
2nd	New York Yankees	88	74	.543	7.0
3rd	Baltimore Orioles	85	77	.525	10.0
3rd	Detroit Tigers	85	77	.525	10.0
5th	Boston Red Sox	80	82	.494	15.0
6th	Cleveland Indians	76	86	.469	19.0
7th	Milwaukee Brewers	69	93	.426	26.0
West Division
1st	Chicago White Sox	94	68	.580	--
2nd	Texas Rangers	86	76	.531	8.0
3rd	Kansas City Royals	84	78	.519	10.0
4th	Seattle Mariners	82	80	.506	12.0
5th	California Angels	71	91	.438	23.0
5th	Minnesota Twins	71	91	.438	23.0
7th	Oakland Athletics	68	94	.420	26.0

National League
Rank	Club	Wins	Losses	Win %	GB
East Division
1st	Philadelphia Phillies	97	65	.599	--
2nd	Montreal Expos	94	68	.580	3.0
3rd	St. Louis Cardinals	87	75	.537	10.0
4th	Chicago Cubs	84	78	.519	13.0
5th	Pittsburgh Pirates	75	87	.463	22.0
6th	Florida Marlins	64	98	.395	33.0
7th	New York Mets	59	103	.364	38.0
West Division
1st	Atlanta Braves	104	58	.642	--
2nd	San Francisco Giants	103	59	.636	1.0
3rd	Houston Astros	85	77	.525	19.0
4th	Los Angeles Dodgers	81	81	.500	23.0
5th	Cincinnati Reds	73	89	.451	31.0
6th	Colorado Rockies	67	95	.414	37.0
7th	San Diego Padres	61	101	.377	43.0

== Managers ==
=== American League ===
Team	Manager	Comments
Baltimore Orioles	Johnny Oates	
Boston Red Sox	Butch Hobson	
California Angels	Buck Rodgers	
Chicago White Sox	Gene Lamont	Won American League West
Cleveland Indians	Mike Hargrove	
Detroit Tigers	Sparky Anderson	
Kansas City Royals	Hal McRae	
Milwaukee Brewers	Phil Garner	
Minnesota Twins	Tom Kelly	
New York Yankees	Buck Showalter	
Oakland Athletics	Tony La Russa	
Seattle Mariners	Lou Piniella	
Texas Rangers	Kevin Kennedy	
Toronto Blue Jays	Cito Gaston	Won World Series

=== National League ===
Team	Manager	Comments
Atlanta Braves	Bobby Cox	Won National League West
Chicago Cubs	Jim Lefebvre	
Cincinnati Reds	Tony Pérez	Replaced during the season by Davey Johnson
Colorado Rockies	Don Baylor	Expansion team
Florida Marlins	Rene Lachemann	Expansion team
Houston Astros	Art Howe	
Los Angeles Dodgers	Tommy Lasorda	
Montreal Expos	Felipe Alou	
New York Mets	Jeff Torborg	Replaced during the season by Dallas Green
Philadelphia Phillies	Jim Fregosi	Won the National League pennant
Pittsburgh Pirates	Jim Leyland	
St. Louis Cardinals	Joe Torre	
San Diego Padres	Jim Riggleman	
San Francisco Giants	Dusty Baker	

== Events ==
=== January–March ===
- January 5 – Reggie Jackson is elected to the Baseball Hall of Fame by the Baseball Writers' Association of America, receiving 94% of the vote.
- March 22 – On an off-day during spring training, Cleveland Indians pitchers Tim Crews, Steve Olin and Bob Ojeda are fishing on a rented 18-foot motorbass boat, when the vessel strikes a pier at high speed on Little Lake Nellie near Winter Haven, Florida, killing Crews and Olin. They are the first active major leaguers to die since Thurman Munson in 1979. Ojeda is seriously injured but survives.

=== April–June ===
- April 6 – Against the Atlanta Braves at Wrigley Field, Chicago Cubs pitcher José Guzmán has a no-hitter broken up with two out in the ninth by an Otis Nixon single. The hit is the only one Guzmán allows in a 1–0 victory. The no-hitter would have been first by a Cubs pitcher since Milt Pappas in 1972.
- April 8 – Against the New York Yankees at Cleveland Stadium, Carlos Baerga of the Cleveland Indians becomes the first player to hit a home run from both sides of the plate in the same inning. In the Indians' nine-run seventh inning, Baerga begins the scoring with a two-run home run against left-hander Steve Howe. He concludes the scoring by homering again, this time against right-hander Steve Farr. The Indians defeat the Yankees, 15–5.
- April 22 – At the Kingdome, Chris Bosio of the Seattle Mariners no-hits the Boston Red Sox 7–0. He walks the first two batters of the game, Ernest Riles and Carlos Quintana, and after the latter is retired on Mike Greenwell's double play grounder, no other Red Sox reaches base. Mariners shortstop Omar Vizquel makes the last dramatic out by bare-handing Riles' high-chopper over the mound.
- May 9 – Down 5–2 to the St. Louis Cardinals, Mariano Duncan hits a grand slam off of Lee Smith in the bottom of the 8th inning to lead the Philadelphia Phillies to a 6–5 comeback win.
- May 20 – With the Mets at 13–25, Jeff Torborg is fired as manager of the New York Mets and replaced by Dallas Green.
- May 26 – Jose Canseco of the Texas Rangers allows a homerun to bounce off his head.
- May 27 – Two home runs shy of 400 for his career, long time Atlanta Brave and current Colorado Rockie Dale Murphy retires.
- June 3 – With the first pick in the 1993 Major League Baseball draft, the Seattle Mariners select Alex Rodriguez. A-Rod signs with the team August 30, 1993. Other notable selections include Trot Nixon (#7, Boston Red Sox), Billy Wagner (#12, Houston Astros), Derrek Lee (#14, San Diego Padres), Chris Carpenter (#15 Toronto Blue Jays), Torii Hunter (#20, Minnesota Twins), Scott Rolen (second round, Philadelphia Phillies), Kevin Millwood (11th round, Atlanta Braves), Gary Matthews Jr. (13th round, Padres), Jermaine Dye (17th round, Braves), John Rocker (18th round, Braves) and Kirk Presley, whom the New York Mets select number eight overall. Presley never plays in the majors; he is, however, the third cousin of Elvis Presley.
- June 28 – Just six days after he breaks Bob Boone's Major League record for games caught, the Chicago White Sox controversially release Carlton Fisk. Fisk would never play in MLB again.

=== July–August ===
- July 3 – Philadelphia Phillies relief pitcher Mitch Williams delivers a walk-off RBI single at 4:40 AM EDT to win the 2nd game of a rain-delayed doubleheader against the San Diego Padres at Veterans Stadium. It is still the latest ending to a game in MLB history.
- July 8 – Barry Bonds hits his 200th career home run.
- July 13 – The American League defeats the National League 9–3 in the All-Star Game. MVP Kirby Puckett, Roberto Alomar and Gary Sheffield hit home runs, while the victory goes to Jack McDowell. Craig Biggio is at second base for the NL; an All-Star one year earlier as a catcher, he is the first player ever to make the team at those two positions. A highlight of the game is Randy Johnson firing a 95-MPH fastball over John Kruk's head. Kruk bails out on the next two pitches, then says, "He's going to kill somebody."
- July 20 – At Atlanta–Fulton County Stadium, a fire breaks out in the skybox/press box area, delaying the start of the scheduled game between the Braves and the St. Louis Cardinals. Incidentally, the Braves' trade for Fred McGriff is completed a few days earlier and McGriff arrives at the stadium that night. With the delay, McGriff is able to be inserted into the starting lineup and hits a game-tying two-run homer in the sixth inning, helping the Braves rally from a 5–0 deficit to win 8–5. The Braves trail the San Francisco Giants in the National League West Division by 9 1/2 games at that point, and this game is seen as the game that sparks their run to the division title.
- July 28:
  - Pitcher Anthony Young sees his New York Mets come back to defeat the Florida Marlins, ending his 27-game losing streak; a Major League record.
  - Ken Griffey Jr. of the Seattle Mariners homers in his eighth consecutive game, tying the record held by Dale Long and Don Mattingly.
- August 4 – Tony Gwynn of the San Diego Padres collects six hits against the San Francisco Giants. This is the fourth game this season in which Gwynn collects at least five hits, tying the Major League record held by Ty Cobb and Stan Musial.
- August 7 - In a contest between the Baltimore Orioles and Cleveland Indians at Camden Yards in Baltimore, the crowd cheers as Cleveland pitcher Bob Ojeda makes his first appearance in the majors since a tragic boating accident during spring training of that year. The tragedy claimed the lives of Cleveland pitchers Tim Crews and Steve Olin. Ojeda was the sole survivor of the accident.
- August 14 – Reggie Jackson has his number 44 retired by the New York Yankees.
- August 26 - The New York Mets suspend outfielder Vince Coleman. It is a paid suspension after Coleman admitted to his role in tossing a M-100 into a parking lot at Dodger Stadium, which injured three people.
- August 31 – Without having play suspended, the Minnesota Twins' game tonight wouldn't finish until next month. Their 22-inning bout with Cleveland lasted 6 hours and 17 minutes.

=== September ===
- September 3 – MLB owners vote to split the leagues into three divisions and add a wild card round to the playoffs for 1994.
- September 4:
  - Jim Abbott of the New York Yankees no-hits the Cleveland Indians at Yankee Stadium, 4–0. Abbott, who is born without a right hand, becomes the first Yankee in a decade to throw a no-hitter.
  - The Philadelphia Phillies lose to the Cincinnati Reds by a score of 6–5. In doing so, they set a new National League record by not being shut out in 151 consecutive games. The major league mark of 308 is held by the Yankees (1931–33).
- September 7 – Mark Whiten of the St. Louis Cardinals homers four times and collects twelve RBI, tying the Major League record, in a 15–2 win over the Cincinnati Reds at Riverfront Stadium in Cincinnati. He is the twelfth player in Major League history to hit four home runs in one game and the second in MLB history to drive in 12 runs in one game. This was the second game of a doubleheader; Whiten had an RBI in the first game, which gave him 13 total RBI for the doubleheader, tying yet another major league record.
- September 8 – Darryl Kile of the Houston Astros throws a no-hitter against the New York Mets.
- September 16 – Dave Winfield of the Minnesota Twins records his 3000th career hit, a 9th-inning run-scoring single off Oakland Athletics closer Dennis Eckersley. The nineteenth player to reach the milestone, Winfield is the first to reach it indoors.
- September 18 – In yet another twist to the Red Sox–Yankees rivalry, the Red Sox hold a 3–1 lead in the ninth inning. With two outs, the Yankees' Mike Stanley pops out to end the game, however the play is called a no play when home plate umpire Tim Welke is forced to call time when a fan runs out onto the field just as the pitch is delivered. The Yankees then push three runs across the plate to win the game (4–3 final).
- September 19 – Tom Glavine wins his 20th game of the season for the Atlanta Braves, and becomes the first National League pitcher since Ferguson Jenkins in 1973 to win 20 games in three consecutive seasons.
- September 20 – The Pittsburgh Pirates defeat the New York Mets 6–2 at Three Rivers Stadium, giving the Mets their first 100 loss season since 1967.
- September 22:
  - Pitcher Nolan Ryan of the Texas Rangers faces just six Seattle Mariners batters before hurting his right elbow. Ryan, who announces his retirement at season's end, finishes his career with 324 wins, a record 5,714 strikeouts and seven no-hitters.
  - The Colorado Rockies play the final home game of their inaugural season and finish with a major league home attendance record of 4,483,350 fans.
- September 27:
  - The Toronto Blue Jays win their third consecutive American League East title with a 2–0 victory over the Brewers in Milwaukee.
  - The Chicago White Sox secure the American League West championship with a 4–2 win against the Seattle Mariners.
  - Randy Myers of the Chicago Cubs becomes the first National League pitcher to record fifty saves for a season by securing a 7–3 win over the Los Angeles Dodgers.
- September 28 – The Philadelphia Phillies clinch their first National League East championship in a decade with a 10–7 win in Pittsburgh. the win gives the Phillies their sixth division championship, trailing only rival Pirates for most NL East championships during the two-division era. Mariano Duncan hits a grand slam, his second of the season, one of the team's 8 for the year.

=== October–December ===
- October 3:
  - The National League West pennant race is decided on the last day of the season, as the Atlanta Braves triumph over the Colorado Rockies 5–3, while the San Francisco Giants are steamrolled by rival Los Angeles Dodgers 12–1. The 103-win Giants are denied a spot in the playoffs, as the Braves take the division by a single game.
  - The Cleveland Indians fall to the Chicago White Sox 4–0 in the final game ever played at Cleveland Stadium.
  - The Texas Rangers fall to the Kansas City Royals 4–1 in the final game ever played at Arlington Stadium. George Brett of the Royals also plays his final major league game, ending with a single to center field.
- October 4 – The Chicago Cubs, with an 84–78 win–loss record, gain their first winning-season in a non-title year since 1972. From 1973 through 1992 the Cubs have a non-winning record except for their NL Eastern division title years of 1984 and 1989.
- October 13 – The Philadelphia Phillies defeat the Atlanta Braves 6–3 in the final game of the 1993 National League Championship Series to win the series 4 games to 2. Mitch Williams strikes out Bill Pecota to end the game. Curt Schilling is named the NLCS MVP.
- October 23 – In a dramatic finish, Joe Carter of the Toronto Blue Jays homers off reliever Mitch Williams with two runners on base in the bottom of the 9th inning to give Toronto an 8–6 victory over the Philadelphia Phillies and the 1993 World Series championship. Lenny Dykstra hits his fourth homer of the Series for the Phillies. Paul Molitor is named the World Series MVP. This is the last Major League Baseball game to date to be televised by CBS.
- November 3 – Greg Maddux wins his second NL Cy Young Award as he easily outpoints Bill Swift of the Giants and teammate Tom Glavine on ballots cast by the BBWAA. The 27-year-old right-hander becomes the first hurler to win baseball's best pitcher honors in back-to-back seasons for two different teams. He won the award as a member of the Cubs in 1992.
- November 10 – Chicago White Sox slugger Frank Thomas was unanimously named the American League MVP. The first baseman, who ranks in the top 10 of the league's nine offensive categories, batted .317 with 41 home runs and knocked in 128 RBIs for the divisional champion White Sox.
- November 19 – Howard Johnson who would turn 33 at the end of the month becomes the first free agent to sign with another team this off-season when he agreed to a one-year deal worth $2,100,000 to play for the Colorado Rockies. the switch-hitting slugger who led the National League in homers and RBIs two years ago with the New York Mets, has seen his production drop in recent seasons, primarily due to injuries.
- November 22:
  - The Texas Rangers sign free agent first baseman Will Clark to a multi-year contract. Clark, who bats .283 with 73 RBI for the San Francisco Giants, raises his average to .329 with the Rangers in 1994.
  - The Baltimore Orioles sign free agent pitcher Sid Fernandez to a three-year contract.

== Movies ==
- Cooperstown (TV)
- Man From Left Field, The
- Sandlot, The
- Rookie of the Year

== Births ==
=== January ===
- January 2 – Reed Garrett
- January 2 – Yoan López
- January 2 – José Marmolejos
- January 5 – John Nogowski
- January 6 – Reyes Moronta
- January 8 – Jeff Hoffman
- January 12 – Aramis Garcia
- January 14 – Dovydas Neverauskas
- January 14 – Boog Powell
- January 18 – Jarlin García
- January 19 – Nick Burdi
- January 22 – Ramón Torres
- January 28 – Zac Reininger
- January 30 – Brett Graves
- January 30 – Ben Meyer
- January 30 – Kodai Senga
- January 31 – Locke St. John

=== February ===
- February 1 – Alberto Baldonado
- February 2 – Adrian Houser
- February 3 – Austin Davis
- February 3 – Kyle Dowdy
- February 5 – Mark Zagunis
- February 7 – Zach Davies
- February 7 – J. P. Feyereisen
- February 8 – James Naile
- February 10 – Max Kepler
- February 10 – Jorge López
- February 10 – Brandon Woodruff
- February 11 – Matt Gage
- February 13 – José Fernández
- February 14 – Yermín Mercedes
- February 14 – Nick Pivetta
- February 16 – Sōsuke Genda
- February 17 – Kevin Cron
- February 17 – Zac Grotz
- February 17 – Stephen Tarpley
- February 19 – Josh Fuentes
- February 19 – Daniel Mengden
- February 20 – Jurickson Profar
- February 21 – Jesús Reyes
- February 24 – José Rojas
- February 24 – Robert Stephenson
- February 25 – Erick Castillo
- February 25 – Erick Fedde

=== March ===
- March 1 – Jason Alexander
- March 1 – Michael Conforto
- March 2 – Adolis García
- March 2 – Josh Taylor
- March 4 – Jake Hager
- March 5 – Sam Howard
- March 5 – Kyle Schwarber
- March 8 – Rafael Bautista
- March 8 – Josh James
- March 9 – Randy Wynne
- March 11 – Matt Festa
- March 12 – Jacob Lindgren
- March 13 – Robinson Leyer
- March 14 – Darryl George
- March 15 – Greg Allen
- March 15 – Michael Fulmer
- March 16 – Jacob Rhame
- March 17 – Rhys Hoskins
- March 18 – Jesen Therrien
- March 19 – Darien Nuñez
- March 21 – Frankie Montas
- March 23 – Art Warren
- March 24 – Chris Bostick
- March 24 – J. B. Wendelken
- March 25 – Phil Maton
- March 26 – Trevor Oaks
- March 27 – Clay Holmes
- March 27 – Brandon Nimmo
- March 27 – Eric Stout
- March 28 – Robel García
- March 31 – Ty Buttrey
- March 31 – Jonatan Isenia

=== April ===
- April 3 – Victor Alcántara
- April 3 – Andy Ibáñez
- April 4 – Miguel Almonte
- April 4 – John Bormann
- April 5 – John Curtiss
- April 6 – Alex McRae
- April 7 – David Bote
- April 7 – Eduardo Rodríguez
- April 12 – Kyle Bird
- April 13 – Koda Glover
- April 14 – Brandon Finnegan
- April 15 – Cody Reed
- April 15 – Daniel Zamora
- April 16 – Tyler Bashlor
- April 16 – Keone Kela
- April 17 – Greg Mahle
- April 21 – Jordan Romano
- April 22 – Andrés Machado
- April 24 – John Means
- April 25 – Daniel Norris
- April 26 – Dairon Blanco
- April 27 – J. D. Davis
- April 28 – Matt Beaty
- April 28 – Matt Chapman
- April 28 – Kyle Keller
- April 29 – Rookie Davis

=== May ===
- May 3 – Shuto Takajo
- May 5 – Tyler Cyr
- May 6 – Mallex Smith
- May 9 – Luis Perdomo
- May 10 – P. J. Higgins
- May 10 – A. J. Reed
- May 11 – Miguel Sanó
- May 12 – Taylor Guilbeau
- May 13 – Taylor Clarke
- May 13 – Max Moroff
- May 13 – Gerardo Reyes
- May 14 – Kyle Freeland
- May 14 – Roman Quinn
- May 15 – Trevor Richards
- May 16 – Jake Jewell
- May 16 – Luis Sardiñas
- May 19 – Brian Anderson
- May 21 – Joe Ross
- May 23 – Tyler Beede
- May 26 – Garrett Stubbs
- May 26 – Gabriel Ynoa
- May 27 – Tanner Anderson

=== June ===
- June 4 – Jorge Bonifacio
- June 4 – Aaron Nola
- June 6 – Joey Lucchesi
- June 7 – James Reeves
- June 9 – Jonathan Holder
- June 11 – Jorge Alfaro
- June 12 – Sean Newcomb
- June 18 – Tayler Saucedo
- June 20 – Adalberto Mejía
- June 21 – Sam Clay
- June 23 – Tim Anderson
- June 23 – Hobie Harris
- June 24 – Alejandro Chacín
- June 27 – Yacksel Ríos
- June 28 – Michael Feliz
- June 30 – Trea Turner

=== July ===
- July 1 – Thyago Vieira
- July 2 – Pedro Araújo
- July 5 – Jorge Polanco
- July 8 – Caleb Frare
- July 9 – James Bourque
- July 9 – Jace Fry
- July 9 – Oscar Hernández
- July 10 – Jalen Beeks
- July 10 – David Hess
- July 10 – Chad Sobotka
- July 15 – Brian O'Keefe
- July 15 – Masataka Yoshida
- July 18 – Robert Gsellman
- July 20 – Pedro Severino
- July 21 – Aaron Durley
- July 23 – Matt Hall
- July 24 – Connor Overton
- July 26 – Wes Benjamin
- July 26 – Ryan O'Hearn
- July 26 – Jefry Rodríguez
- July 27 – Nick Dini
- July 28 – Drew Jackson
- July 30 – Jacob Faria
- July 30 – Jared Walsh

=== August ===
- August 2 – Paul DeJong
- August 2 – Keury Mella
- August 4 – Kevin Newman
- August 9 – Kensuke Kondo
- August 9 – Brady Lail
- August 10 – Anthony Banda
- August 12 – Hunter Wood
- August 15 – Nick Gardewine
- August 15 – Jacob Webb
- August 17 – Víctor Caratini
- August 17 – Jesse Winker
- August 21 – Derek Fisher
- August 21 – Luke Weaver
- August 22 – Braden Bishop
- August 23 – Tyler Glasnow
- August 23 – Braxton Lee
- August 23 – Max Povse
- August 27 – Sam Travis
- August 28 – Seby Zavala
- August 31 – Ronel Blanco

=== September ===
- September 1 – Shōta Imanaga
- September 2 – A. J. Minter
- September 3 – Corey Oswalt
- September 4 – Erik Swanson
- September 5 – Pablo Reyes
- September 5 – Blake Trahan
- September 6 – Jason Vosler
- September 8 – Nick Williams
- September 9 – Jimmy Herget
- September 9 – Alex Young
- September 12 – Keynan Middleton
- September 14 – Andrew Vasquez
- September 17 – James Marvel
- September 21 – Aaron Bummer
- September 22 – Mauricio Cabrera
- September 22 – Hunter Owen
- September 24 – Drew Smith
- September 24 – José Torres
- September 25 – Vimael Machín
- September 25 – Matt Swarmer
- September 26 – Wei-Chieh Huang
- September 26 – Jordan Luplow
- September 28 – Danny Mendick
- September 30 – Trent Thornton

=== October ===
- October 1 – Caleb Boushley
- October 2 – Lance McCullers Jr.
- October 3 – Kevin Kramer
- October 5 – Tyler Ferguson
- October 8 – Travis Bergen
- October 12 – Ketel Marté
- October 12 – Sal Romano
- October 14 – Austin Dean
- October 14 – Patrick Mazeika
- October 17 – Brody Koerner
- October 19 – Lourdes Gurriel Jr.
- October 20 – Trevor Kelley
- October 20 – Chris Shaw
- October 23 – Cristofer Ogando
- October 23 – Zach Thompson
- October 29 – Raudy Read

=== November ===
- November 1 – Eric Hanhold
- November 4 – Steven Duggar
- November 4 – Chih-Wei Hu
- November 5 – Jacob Waguespack
- November 11 – P. J. Conlon
- November 12 – Zach Reks
- November 14 – Francisco Lindor
- November 17 – J. T. Brubaker
- November 19 – Joey Gallo
- November 19 – Ian Gibaut
- November 19 – Framber Valdez
- November 23 – Austin Gomber
- November 24 – Jeimer Candelario
- November 25 – Sandy Báez
- November 27 – Nick Heath
- November 28 – Jake Lemoine
- November 28 – Yefry Ramírez
- November 29 – Dean Deetz
- November 30 – Harold Castro
- November 30 – D. J. Stewart

=== December ===
- December 4 – Paul Blackburn
- December 5 – Tejay Antone
- December 5 – Trevor Megill
- December 5 – Cam Vieaux
- December 6 – Taylor Jones
- December 9 – Geoff Hartlieb
- December 10 – Christin Stewart
- December 11 – Gabriel Guerrero
- December 13 – Johan Camargo
- December 13 – Carson Fulmer
- December 14 – Taylor Ward
- December 15 – Luis Marté
- December 16 – Peter Fairbanks
- December 17 – Josh Sborz
- December 18 – Byron Buxton
- December 19 – Taylor Gushue
- December 19 – José Leclerc
- December 20 – Trent Giambrone
- December 21 – Josh Staumont
- December 22 – Gavin Cecchini
- December 22 – Tyler Gilbert
- December 23 – Dany Jiménez
- December 24 – James Norwood
- December 26 – Yonny Chirinos
- December 28 – Scott Effross
- December 29 – Chase De Jong
- December 30 – Wyatt Mathisen
- December 31 – Miguel Sánchez

== Deaths ==
=== January ===
- January 11 – Frank Quinn, 65, pitcher who played from 1949 to 1950 for the Boston Red Sox.
- January 12 – Earl Browne, 81, outfielder and first baseman whose 22-year professional career included stints with the Pittsburgh Pirates and Philadelphia Phillies in four seasons from 1935 to 1938.
- January 12 – Fred Koenig, 61, minor league first baseman and manager who spent 11 major-league seasons as a coach for five clubs between 1970 and 1985, and two years as player development director of the 1973–1974 St. Louis Cardinals.
- January 12 – Joe Orrell, 75, pitcher who played from 1943 through 1945 for the Detroit Tigers.
- January 13 – Harlan Pyle, 87, pitcher for the 1928 Cincinnati Reds.
- January 17 – Nick Polly, 75, who played third base with the Brooklyn Dodgers in 1937 and for the Boston Red Sox in 1945.
- January 21 – Charlie Gehringer, 89, Hall of Fame second baseman and six-time All-Star who played his entire career for the Detroit Tigers, winning the American League MVP Award in 1937, while batting .320 lifetime, scoring 100 runs twelve times, surpassing both 200 hits and 100 RBI in seven seasons, leading the league in hits and doubles twice each and in stolen bases and triples once each, as well as retiring as the seventh player with the most doubles in MLB history; briefly served as Tigers' general manager (1952–1953).
- January 28 – Vern Kennedy, 85, twice All-Star pitcher for seven teams between 1934 and 1945, mainly for the Chicago White Sox from 1934 to 1937, who threw the first no-hitter in Comiskey Park history, a 5–0 shutout over the Cleveland Indians on August 31, 1935.

=== February ===
- February 2 – Merle Anthony, 66, American League umpire from 1969 to 1975.
- February 2 – Lenny Levy, 79, member of Pittsburgh Pirates' MLB coaching staff (1957–1963); former scout and minor-league catcher.
- February 5 – Ed Boland, 84, right fielder who played for the 1934–1935 Philadelphia Phillies and 1944 Washington Senators.
- February 7 – Floyd Stromme, 76, pitcher for the 1939 Cleveland Indians.
- February 8 – Elwood "Pete" Quesada, 88, retired United States Air Force general who was the founding majority owner of the expansion Washington Senators (now the Texas Rangers) from November 1960 to January 1963.
- February 10 – Rip Repulski, 65, All-Star and solid defensive outfielder for the St. Louis Cardinals, Philadelphia Phillies, Los Angeles Dodgers and Boston Red Sox in a span of nine seasons from 1953 to 1961, who won a World Series ring with the 1959 Dodgers and pinch-hit an eighth-inning, grand slam off Chicago White Sox's Don Ferrarese in a 9–7 Red Sox victory at Fenway Park in 1960, during his first American League at bat.
- February 16 – Bill Zinser, 81, pitcher for the Washington Senators in 1944, who is most known for scouting future Hall of Famer Sandy Koufax while pitching for the University of Cincinnati in 1954.
- February 23 – Joe Hutcheson, 88, outfielder for the 1933 Brooklyn Dodgers.

=== March ===
- March 3 – Joseph Cairnes, 85, executive with Boston/Milwaukee Braves from 1947 to 1962 who served as president of the Braves in 1957 and 1958, when they won two National League pennants and the 1957 World Series.
- March 4 – Bill Antonello, 65, outfielder for the 1953 Brooklyn Dodgers.
- March 6 – George Stumpf, 82, outfielder who played for the Boston Red Sox and Chicago White Sox over parts of four seasons spanning 1931–1936.
- March 15 – Pat Cooper, 75, two-way player who pitched and played at first base for the Philadelphia Athletics from 1946 to 1947.
- March 15 – Paul Easterling, 87, outfielder who played with the Detroit Tigers in 1928 and 1930 and for the Philadelphia Athletics in 1938.
- March 17 – Joe Abreu, 79, utility man for the Cincinnati Reds in the 1942 season.
- March 18 – Buck Jordan, 86, solid defensive first baseman and basically a line-drive hitter, who played for the New York Giants, Washington Senators, Boston Braves, Cincinnati Reds and Philadelphia Phillies during eleven seasons spanning 1927–1938.
- March 18 – Joe Taylor, 67, Negro leagues outfielder who also played in the Minor Leagues before joining MLB with the Philadelphia Athletics, Cincinnati Redlegs, St. Louis Cardinals and Baltimore Orioles in a span of four seasons from 1954 to 1959.
- March 22 – Steve Olin, 27, submarining relief pitcher for the Cleveland Indians from 1988 to 1992, whose 48 career saves ranked him third in club history; died in a spring training boating accident in Florida that also took the life of teammate Tim Crews.
- March 23 – Tim Crews, 31, relief pitcher for the Los Angeles Dodgers from 1987 through 1992, who had recently been acquired by the Cleveland Indians.
- March 28 – Ray Flanigan, 70, pitcher who played with the Cleveland Indians in 1946.

=== April ===
- April 2 – Pat Friday, 69, executive in Charlie Finley's insurance business who—despite a complete lack of baseball experience—served as general manager of Finley's Kansas City Athletics between 1961 and 1965.
- April 5 – Joe Coscarart, 83, middle infielder and third baseman who appeared in 190 games for the Boston Braves in 1935 and 1936, spending much of his baseball career in the Pacific Coast League with the Mission Reds, Seattle Indians, St. Paul Saints, Hollywood Stars and Portland Beavers.
- April 7 – Bob Alexander, 70, Canadian pitcher who played with the Baltimore Orioles in 1955 and for the Cleveland Indians in 1957.
- April 7 – Howie McFarland, 83, outfielder for the 1945 Washington Senators.
- April 21 – Hal Schumacher, 82, two-time All-Star pitcher who posted a 158–121 record and 3.36 ERA in 13 seasons for the New York Giants, contributing to three National League pennants and the 1933 World Series title.
- April 22 – Mark Koenig, 88, shortstop who played twelve seasons in Major League Baseball with five teams from 1925 through 1936, as well as the last survivor of the famed New York Yankees "Murderers' Row" teams that won consecutives World Series titles in 1927 and 1928.
- April 24 – Jim McDonnell, 70, catcher who played for the Cleveland Indians from 1943 to 1945.
- April 26 – Roger Miller, 38, pitcher for the 1974 Milwaukee Brewers.

=== May ===
- May 7 – Thurman Tucker, 75, center fielder for the Chicago White Sox and Cleveland Indians in a span of nine seasons from 1942 to 1951, who was selected to the 1944 MLB All-Star Game and was a member of the 1948 World Series champion Indians.
- May 8 – Al Tate, 74, pitcher who worked in two games for the 1946 Pittsburgh Pirates.
- May 9 – Ted Cieslak, 76, third baseman who played for the Philadelphia Phillies in the 1944 season.
- May 13 – Milt Jordan, 65, pitcher for the 1953 Detroit Tigers.
- May 19 – Oscar Grimes, 78, All-Star corner infielder and third baseman who played for the Cleveland Indians, New York Yankees and Philadelphia Athletics over nine seasons spanning 1938–1946.
- May 20 – Al Aber, 65, pitcher who played six years in the Major with the Cleveland Indians, Detroit Tigers and Kansas City Athletics during six seasons between 1950 and 1957.
- May 28 – Fats Dantonio, 74, backup catcher for the Brooklyn Dodgers in the 1944 and 1945 seasons.
- May 29 – Alex Kampouris, 80, second baseman for the Cincinnati Reds, New York Giants, Brooklyn Dodgers and Washington Senators in nine seasons from 1934 to 1943, who is considered the first ever Major League player of Greek descent.

=== June ===
- June 2 – Johnny Mize, 80, Hall of Fame and ten-time All-Star first baseman whose career spanned 15 seasons from 1936 to 1952 with the St. Louis Cardinals, New York Giants and New York Yankees; hit .312 lifetime with 359 home runs in 1,884 games, batted .300 or better nine seasons in a row, and set MLB record by hitting three homers in a game six times; won 1939 National League batting title; led NL in RBI and total bases three times each, and in runs, doubles and triples once each; in his best season, 1947, he belted 51 homers (tying Ralph Kiner for the NL lead), led his circuit in RBI and runs scored, and became the first player to strike out less than 50 times while hitting more than 50 home runs; late in his career, member of five consecutive World Series champs with Yankees from 1949 to 1953.
- June 4 – Bobby Reeves, 93, utility-man who played all positions except catcher for the Washington Senators and Boston Red over six seasons from 1926 to 1931.
- June 7 – Skippy Roberge, 76, backup infielder for the Boston Braves in part of three seasons spanning 1941–1946.
- June 8 – Roy Henshaw, 81, left-handed pitcher for the Chicago Cubs, Brooklyn Dodgers, St. Louis Cardinals and Detroit Tigers during eight seasons from 1933 to 1944.
- June 11 – Jack Conway, 74, middle infielder who played for the Cleveland Indians and New York Giants in a span of four seasons from 1941 to 1948.
- June 19 – Alex Hooks, 86, first baseman for the 1935 Philadelphia Athletics.
- June 22 – Bubba Phillips, 65, third baseman and outfielder who played from 1955 through 1964 for the Detroit Tigers, Chicago White Sox and Cleveland Indians.
- June 26 – Roy Campanella, 71, Hall of Fame catcher and eight-time All-Star for the Brooklyn Dodgers from 1948 to 1957, who won three MVP awards (1951, 1953, 1955) – after several standout years in the Negro leagues, where he posted an all-time career .500 slugging average; established MLB season records for catchers for the most home runs (41) and runs batted in (142); set a National League mark in fielding chances for most consecutive seasons (six), led all catchers in fielding average seven times, and tying records for most consecutive seasons leading his league in putouts (six) and 100 or more games caught (nine); his career was ended by a January 1958 automobile accident that left him paralyzed.

=== July ===
- July 2 – Joe Muich, 89, pitcher who played with the Boston Braves in its 1924 season.
- July 3 – Don Drysdale, 56, Hall of Fame and nine-time All-Star pitcher for the Brooklyn/Los Angeles Dodgers between 1956 and 1969, who posted a 209–166 record with a 2.95 ERA and 2,486 strikeouts; led National League in strikeouts three times and threw 49 shutouts; won 25 games (losing nine) in 1962, to capture the Cy Young Award; threw six consecutive shutouts in 1968 and set a record with 58 2/3 consecutive scoreless innings in the same season; three-time World Series champion (1959, 1963 and 1965); upon his playing retirement, forged a two-decades-long career as a baseball broadcaster, working for five MLB teams (including the Dodgers) and two major TV networks.
- July 4 – Walter Stephenson, 82, catcher who played for the Chicago Cubs and Philadelphia Phillies in part of three seasons from 1935 to 1937.
- July 5 – Charlie Bishop, 64, pitcher for the Philadelphia and Kansas City Athletics from 1952 to 1955.
- July 7 – Ben Chapman, 84, four-time All-Star outfielder and member of the 1932 World Series champions New York Yankees, who batted .300 or better six times and led the American League in stolen bases four times, whose playing reputation was eclipsed by the role he played in 1947 as manager of the Philadelphia Phillies, antagonizing Jackie Robinson by shouting racist epithets and opposing his presence on a major league team.
- July 7 – Larry Napp, 77, American League umpire from 1951 to 1974 who worked in four World Series and four All-Star Games.
- July 17 – Harold Greiner, 86, All-American Girls Professional Baseball League manager.
- July 18 – Ted Sadowski, 57, middle relief pitcher for the Washington Senators and Minnesota Twins during three seasons from 1960 to 1962, and member of a baseball family that included his brothers Bob and Ed and nephew Jim.
- July 24 – George Armstrong, 69, catcher for the 1946 Philadelphia Athletics.
- July 30 – Bob Wright, 101, pitcher for the Chicago Cubs in the 1915 season, who, at the time of his death, was the oldest living major league baseball player.
- July 31 – Sam Langford, 93, center fielder who played from 1926 through 1928 with the Boston Red Sox and Cleveland Indians.

=== August ===
- August 1 – Ewing Kauffman, 76, entrepreneur, philanthropist, and founder/owner of the Kansas City Royals, who in 1969 returned Major League Baseball to Kansas City, while setting up an unprecedented complex succession plan to keep the team in the city.
- August 2 – Joe Gantenbein, 77, backup infielder for the Philadelphia Athletics in the 1939 and 1940 seasons.
- August 4 – Bob Maier, 77, third baseman for the 1945 Detroit Tigers.
- August 6 – Tex Hughson, 77, three-time All-Star pitcher for the Boston Red Sox during eight seasons from 1941 to 1949, who posted a 22–6 record and 2.59 ERA in 1942, while leading the American League in wins, strikeouts (113), complete games (22) and innings pitched (281.0).
- August 6 – Bob Miller, 54, pitcher who played for ten teams over 17 seasons spanning 1957–1974, winning three World Series rings with the Los Angeles Dodgers (1963, 1965) and the Pittsburgh Pirates (1971).
- August 10 – Bill Ferrazzi, 86, pitcher for the 1935 Philadelphia Athletics.
- August 11 – Bill Wilson, 50, relief pitcher who played from 1969 through 1973 with the Philadelphia Phillies.
- August 12 – Quincy Trouppe, 80, Negro leagues catcher and later a 39-year-old rookie with the Cleveland Indians in 1952, who along with pitcher Toothpick Sam Jones, formed the first black battery in American League history on May 3, 1952.
- August 16 – Bama Rowell, 77, second baseman and outfielder who played for the Boston Bees/Braves and the Philadelphia Phillies over all or part of six seasons from 1939 to 1948.
- August 17 – Al Sima, 71, pitcher for the Washington Senators, Chicago White Sox and Philadelphia Athletics in a span of four seasons between 1950 and 1954.
- August 21 – Felix Evans, 82, Negro league baseball pitcher in a span of 13 seasons between 1934 and 1949, whose best season came in 1946 while playing for the Memphis Red Sox, posting a 15–1 record prior to the East–West All-Star Game break and earning the starting pitcher role for the West All Star team.
- August 22 – Eddie Chiles, 83, owner of the Texas Rangers from 1980 to 1989.
- August 23 – Jim Reninger, 78, pitcher who played in 1938 and 1939 with the Philadelphia Athletics.
- August 25 – Cecil Bolton, 89, first baseman for the 1928 Cleveland Indians.
- August 31 – Jesse Hill, 86, outfielder who played from 1935 to 1937 with the New York Yankees, Washington Senators and Philadelphia Athletics, later best known for his long tenure as a coach and athletic director at the University of Southern California.

=== September ===
- September 8 – Earl Mattingly, 88, pitcher for the 1931 Brooklyn Robins.
- September 12 – Granny Hamner, 66, three-time All-Star shortstop who played 16 years for the Philadelphia Phillies from 1944 to 1959, part of the time as team captain; regarded as one of the key players on the famed Whiz Kids Phillies team that clinched the 1950 National League pennant, and hit .429 (6-for-14) with three extra-base hits in the 1950 World Series, a four-game New York Yankees sweep led by their strong pitching staff; compiled more than 80 runs batted in over four seasons.
- September 14 – Bill Atwood, 81, backup catcher for the Philadelphia Phillies over part of five seasons spanning 1936–1940.
- September 15 – Ethan Allen, 89, center fielder for six different teams from 1926 to 1938, who posted a career .300 average and led the National League in doubles in 1934, and also served later as the baseball coach at Yale University from 1946 until 1968, reaching the College World Series finals in both 1947 and 1948, as his players included future President George H. W. Bush.
- September 16 – Max Marshall, 79, right fielder for the Cincinnati Reds in three seasons from 1942 to 1944.
- September 17 – Pete Elko, 75, third baseman who played with the Chicago Cubs in the 1943 and 1944 seasons.
- September 19 – Frank Wurm, 79, pitcher for the 1944 Brooklyn Dodgers.
- September 21 – John Goodell, 86, pitcher who played for the Chicago White Sox in 1928.
- September 24 – Izzy Goldstein, 85, pitcher who spent seven years in professional baseball, including 16 games in Major League Baseball with the Detroit Tigers in 1932, being also one of eight Russian ballplayers that have performed in the majors.

=== October ===
- October 11 – Emmett O'Neill, 77, pitcher who played from 1943 through 1946 for the Boston Red Sox, Chicago Cubs and Chicago White Sox.
- October 11 – Lee Walls, 60, All-Star outfielder who played with the Pittsburgh Pirates, Chicago Cubs, Cincinnati Reds, Philadelphia Phillies and Los Angeles Dodgers in a span of ten seasons between 1952 and 1964; member of 1963 World Series champion Dodgers.
- October 16 – Jimmie DeShong, 83, pitcher for the Philadelphia Athletics, New York Yankees and Washington Senators over seven seasons from 1932 to 1939.
- October 19 – John Kerr, 94, second baseman who played for the Detroit Tigers, Chicago White Sox and Washington Senators in part of eight seasons spanning 1923–1934.
- October 21 – Wayne Belardi, 63, first baseman for the Brooklyn Dodgers and Detroit Tigers in part of six seasons from 1950 to 1956, and also a member of the Dodgers team than won the 1953 National League pennant.
- October 21 – Bob Hunter, 80, sportswriter for several Los Angeles newspapers for 58 years, and the 1989 winner of the J. G. Taylor Spink Award for his distinguished baseball writing.
- October 23 – Marv Blaylock, 64, first baseman for the Philadelphia Phillies and New York Giants over part of four seasons between 1950 and 1957.
- October 23 – John Wells, 70, pitcher for the 1944 Brooklyn Dodgers.
- October 23 – Steve Wylie, 82, Negro league baseball pitcher who played from 1944 through 1947 with the Memphis Red Sox and the Kansas City Monarchs.
- October 28 – Cal Koonce, 52, relief pitcher who played for the Chicago Cubs, New York Mets and Boston Red Sox in ten seasons from 1962 to 1971, and also a member of the 1969 Mets' world championship team.
- October 28 – Bob Seeds, 86, backup outfielder for six different teams from 1930 to 1940, and also a member of the 1936 World Series champion New York Yankees.
- October 29 – Anse Moore, 76, outfielder whose career spanned 12 years and included a major league stint with the Detroit Tigers in 1946.

=== November ===
- November 2 – Butch Nieman, 75, left fielder for the Boston Braves in three seasons from 1943 to 1945, one of many ballplayers who only appeared in the major leagues during World War II, who finished in the National League's top ten for triples (8) in 1943, both for home runs (16) and assists (13) in 1944, and for at bats per home run (14-per-247) in 1945.
- November 2 – Fred Williams, 80, first baseman for the 1945 Cleveland Indians.
- November 4 – Doris Satterfield, 67, three-time All-Star outfielder and member of two AAGPBL champion teams.
- November 4 – Cliff Young, 29, pitcher for the California Angels and Cleveland Indians in part of four seasons spanning 1990–1993, who was killed in a traffic accident, becoming, along with Tim Crews and Steve Olin, the third member of the 1993 Indians to die tragically.
- November 6 – Ed Sadowski, 62, catcher for the Boston Red Sox, Los Angeles Angels and Atlanta Braves between 1960 and 1966, who died a few months after his brother, pitcher Ted Sadowski.
- November 7 – Tex Shirley, 75, pitcher who played for the Philadelphia Athletics and St. Louis Browns in part of five seasons spanning 1941–1946; member of pennant-winning 1944 Browns.
- November 8 – Hank Leiber, 82, three-time All-Star center fielder for the New York Giants and Chicago Cubs during ten seasons from 1933 to 1942, who posted a .288 with 101 home runs and 518 RBI in his career, from New York Giants and Chicago Cubs, including a three-home run game in 1939.
- November 12 – Bill Dickey, 86, Hall of Fame and 11-time All-Star catcher for the New York Yankees over 17 seasons spanning 1928–1946, who posted a lifetime batting average of .313 with 202 home runs and 1,209 RBI and was a member of seven World Series champion teams; set a record by catching 100 or more games in 13 straight seasons while holding a World Series record for catching games (38); reached double digits in home runs nine times, the 100 RBI mark four times, and also batted better than .300 11 times; manager of the Yankees from May 25 to September 12, 1946, then coached for them from 1949 to 1957 and in 1960, earning six more Series rings.
- November 12 – LeGrant Scott, 83, outfielder for the 1939 Philadelphia Phillies; later a longtime scout.
- November 23 – Grey Clarke, 81, third baseman who played for the Chicago White Sox in 1944.
- November 25 – Burgess Whitehead, 83, last surviving member of the St. Louis Cardinals Gashouse Gang team that won 95 games, the National League pennant, and the 1934 World Series in seven games over the Detroit Tigers.
- November 27 – Jim Hayes, 80, pitcher who played with the Washington Senators in 1935.
- November 28 – Francis L. Dale, 72, co-owner and president of the Cincinnati Reds (1967–1973).
- November 28 – George Piktuzis, 61, relief pitcher for the 1956 Chicago Cubs.

=== December ===
- December 6 – Ray Thomas, 83, catcher who played for the Brooklyn Dodgers in 1938.
- December 8 – Bob Barnes, 91, pitcher for the 1924 Chicago White Sox.
- December 13 – Billy Shantz, 66, backup catcher who played with the Philadelphia and Kansas City Athletics from 1954 to 1955 and for the New York Yankees in 1960, as he had the chance of being able to catch to his elder brother, pitcher and battery mate Bobby Shantz, during their tenure as teammates with the Athletics in 1954 and 1955.
- December 14 – Jerry Scala, 69, outfielder who played from 1948 to 1950 for the Chicago White Sox.
- December 20 – Felix Mackiewicz, 76, outfielder who played for the Philadelphia Athletics, Cleveland Indians and Washington Senators over all or part of six seasons between 1941 and 1947.
- December 21 – Ernie Kish, 75 outfielder for the Philadelphia Athletics during the 1945 season.
- December 21 – Ham Schulte, 81, second baseman who played with the Philadelphia Phillies in its 1940 season.
- December 28 – Augie Galan, 81, three-time All-Star left fielder and corner infielder who played for the Chicago Cubs, Brooklyn Dodgers, Cincinnati Reds, New York Giants and Philadelphia Athletics during 16 seasons 1934 to 1949, hitting .287 with 1,706 hits, 100 home runs and 830 RBI in 1,742 games, as well as becoming the first full-time big leaguer to make 649 plate appearances and not hit into a double play (1935), while leading the National League in stolen bases twice (1935, 1937) and being the first switch hitter to hit a home from each side of the plate in a NL game (1937).
- December 29 – Shirley Jameson, 75, AAGPBL All-Star center fielder.
- December 30 – Tom Alston, 67, first baseman for the St. Louis Cardinals from 1954 through 1957, who made history as the first African American ballplayer to take the field for the Cardinals.
