= List of Major League Baseball players (Sa–Se) =

The following is a list of Major League Baseball players, retired or active.

== Sa through Se ==
Name	Debut	Final game	Position	Teams	Ref
Kirk Saarloos	June 18, 2002	September 20, 2008	Pitcher	Houston Astros, Oakland Athletics, Cincinnati Reds	
CC Sabathia	April 8, 2001		Pitcher	Cleveland Indians, Milwaukee Brewers, New York Yankees	
Erik Sabel	July 9, 1999	July 28, 2002	Pitcher	Arizona Diamondbacks, Detroit Tigers	
Bret Saberhagen	April 4, 1984	August 7, 2001	Pitcher	Kansas City Royals, New York Mets, Colorado Rockies, Boston Red Sox	
Alex Sabo	August 1, 1936	August 1, 1937	Catcher	Washington Senators	
Chris Sabo	April 4, 1988	September 2, 1996	Third baseman	Cincinnati Reds, Baltimore Orioles, Chicago White Sox, St. Louis Cardinals	
Mark Saccomanno	September 8, 2008		First baseman	Houston Astros	
Frank Sacka	April 29, 1951	September 13, 1953	Catcher	Washington Senators	
Brian Sackinsky	April 20, 1996	April 24, 1996	Pitcher	Baltimore Orioles	
Ray Sadecki	May 19, 1960	April 23, 1977	Pitcher	St. Louis Cardinals, San Francisco Giants, New York Mets, Atlanta Braves, Kansas City Royals, Milwaukee Brewers	
Mike Sadek	April 13, 1973	June 10, 1981	Catcher	San Francisco Giants	
Billy Sadler	September 15, 2006		Pitcher	San Francisco Giants, Houston Astros	
Carl Sadler	July 31, 2002	May 18, 2003	Pitcher	Cleveland Indians	
Donnie Sadler	April 1, 1998	May 12, 2007	Utility player	Boston Red Sox, Cincinnati Reds, Kansas City Royals, Texas Rangers, Arizona Diamondbacks	
Ray Sadler	May 8, 2005	May 11, 2005	Outfielder	Pittsburgh Pirates	
Bob Sadowski (3B)	September 16, 1960	September 28, 1963	Third baseman	St. Louis Cardinals, Philadelphia Phillies, Chicago White Sox, |Los Angeles Angels	
Bob Sadowski (P)	June 19, 1963	July 4, 1966	Pitcher	Milwaukee Braves, Boston Red Sox	
Ed Sadowski	April 20, 1960	October 2, 1966	Catcher	Boston Red Sox, Los Angeles Angels, Atlanta Braves	
Jim Sadowski	April 24, 1974	May 14, 1974	Pitcher	Pittsburgh Pirates	
Ryan Sadowski	June 28, 2009		Pitcher	San Francisco Giants	
Ted Sadowski	September 2, 1960	July 4, 1962	Pitcher	Washington Senators, Minnesota Twins	
Chris Sáenz	April 24, 2004	April 24, 2004	Pitcher	Milwaukee Brewers	
Olmedo Sáenz	May 28, 1994	September 27, 2007	First baseman	Chicago White Sox, Oakland Athletics, Los Angeles Dodgers	
Tom Saffell	July 2, 1949	September 25, 1955	Outfielder	Pittsburgh Pirates, Kansas City Athletics	
Harry Sage	April 17, 1890	October 12, 1890	Catcher	Toledo Maumees	
A. J. Sager	April 4, 1994	September 26, 1998	Pitcher	San Diego Padres, Colorado Rockies, Detroit Tigers	
Pony Sager	May 6, 1871	May 30, 1871	Utility player	Rockford Forest Citys	
Marc Sagmoen	April 15, 1997	September 20, 1997	Outfielder	Texas Rangers	
Vic Saier	May 3, 1911	August 5, 1919	First baseman	Chicago Cubs, Pittsburgh Pirates	
Johnny Sain	April 24, 1942	July 15, 1955	Pitcher	Boston Braves, New York Yankees, Kansas City Athletics	
Mike Saipe	June 25, 1998	July 1, 1998	Pitcher	Colorado Rockies	
Takashi Saito	April 9, 2006		Pitcher	Los Angeles Dodgers, Boston Red Sox, Atlanta Braves, Milwaukee Brewers	
Lenn Sakata	July 21, 1977	June 28, 1987	Second baseman	Milwaukee Brewers, Baltimore Orioles, Oakland Athletics, New York Yankees	
Fernando Salas	May 28, 2010		Pitcher	St. Louis Cardinals	
Juan Salas	September 5, 2006		Pitcher	Tampa Bay Devil Rays/Rays	
Marino Salas	May 13, 2008		Pitcher	Pittsburgh Pirates	
Mark Salas	June 19, 1984	October 5, 1991	Catcher	St. Louis Cardinals, Minnesota Twins, New York Yankees, Chicago White Sox, Cleveland Indians, Detroit Tigers	
Ángel Salazar	August 10, 1983	October 1, 1988	Shortstop	Montreal Expos, Kansas City Royals, Chicago Cubs	
Jeff Salazar	September 7, 2006		Outfielder	Colorado Rockies, Arizona Diamondbacks, Pittsburgh Pirates	
Luis Salazar	August 15, 1980	October 4, 1992	Third baseman	San Diego Padres, Chicago White Sox, Detroit Tigers, Chicago Cubs	
Oscar Salazar	April 10, 2002		Utility infielder	Detroit Tigers, Baltimore Orioles, San Diego Padres	
Chris Sale	August 6, 2010		Pitcher	Chicago White Sox	
Freddy Sale	June 30, 1924	June 30, 1924	Pitcher	Pittsburgh Pirates	
Ed Sales	July 15, 1890	October 3, 1890	Shortstop	Pittsburgh Alleghenys	
Solly Salisbury	April 19, 1902	April 24, 1902	Pitcher	Philadelphia Phillies	
Harry Salisbury	August 28, 1879	September 22, 1882	Pitcher	Troy Trojans, Pittsburgh Alleghenys	
Bill Salkeld	April 18, 1945	April 21, 1950	Catcher	Pittsburgh Pirates, Boston Braves, Chicago White Sox	
Roger Salkeld	September 8, 1993	September 28, 1996	Pitcher	Seattle Mariners, Cincinnati Reds	
Slim Sallee	April 16, 1908	September 20, 1921	Pitcher	St. Louis Cardinals, New York Giants, Cincinnati Reds	
Brad Salmon	May 1, 2007		Pitcher	Cincinnati Reds	
Chico Salmon	June 28, 1964	August 14, 1972	Utility player	Cleveland Indians, Baltimore Orioles	
Roger Salmon	May 3, 1912	October 1, 1912	Pitcher	Philadelphia Athletics	
Tim Salmon	August 21, 1992	October 1, 2006	Outfielder	California/Anaheim Angels, Los Angeles Angels of Anaheim	
Ángel Salomé	September 3, 2008		Pinch hitter	Milwaukee Brewers	
Jarrod Saltalamacchia	May 2, 2007		Catcher	Atlanta Braves, Texas Rangers, Boston Red Sox	
Jack Saltzgaver	April 12, 1932	September 30, 1945	Third baseman	New York Yankees, Pittsburgh Pirates	
Gus Salve	September 14, 1908	September 14, 1908	Pitcher	Philadelphia Athletics	
Jack Salveson	June 3, 1933	September 16, 1945	Pitcher	New York Giants, Pittsburgh Pirates, Chicago White Sox, Cleveland Indians	
Manny Salvo	April 22, 1939	October 3, 1943	Pitcher	New York Giants, Boston Bees/Braves, Philadelphia Phillies	
Jeff Samardzija	July 25, 2008		Pitcher	Chicago Cubs	
Joe Sambito	July 20, 1976	October 3, 1987	Pitcher	Houston Astros, New York Mets, Boston Red Sox	
Ed Samcoff	April 21, 1951	April 26, 1951	Second baseman	Philadelphia Athletics	
Ron Samford	April 15, 1954	September 23, 1959	Shortstop	New York Giants, Detroit Tigers, Washington Senators	
Clint Sammons	September 12, 2007		Catcher	Atlanta Braves	
Bill Sampen	April 10, 1990	May 9, 1994	Pitcher	Montreal Expos, Kansas City Royals, California Angels	
Billy Sample	September 2, 1978	October 5, 1986	Outfielder	Texas Rangers, New York Yankees, Atlanta Braves	
Benj Sampson	September 9, 1998	August 19, 1999	Pitcher	Minnesota Twins	
Chris Sampson	June 2, 2006		Pitcher	Houston Astros	
Amado Samuel	April 10, 1962	July 11, 1964	Shortstop	Milwaukee Braves, New York Mets	
Juan Samuel	August 24, 1983	September 26, 1998	Second baseman	Philadelphia Phillies, New York Mets, Los Angeles Dodgers, Kansas City Royals, Cincinnati Reds, Detroit Tigers, Toronto Blue Jays	
Ike Samuels	August 3, 1895	September 28, 1895	Third baseman	St. Louis Cardinals	
Joe Samuels	April 23, 1930	May 1, 1930	Pitcher	Detroit Tigers	
Roger Samuels	July 20, 1988	June 8, 1989	Pitcher	San Francisco Giants, Pittsburgh Pirates	
Alex Sanabia	June 24, 2010		Pitcher	Florida Marlins	
Brian Sanches	June 1, 2006		Pitcher	Philadelphia Phillies, Washington Nationals, Florida Marlins	
Alejandro Sánchez	September 6, 1982	May 16, 1987	Outfielder	Philadelphia Phillies, San Francisco Giants, Detroit Tigers, Minnesota Twins, Oakland Athletics	
Alex Sanchez (P)	May 23, 1989	June 10, 1989	Pitcher	Toronto Blue Jays	
Alex Sánchez (OF)	June 15, 2001	July 23, 2005	Outfielder	Milwaukee Brewers, Detroit Tigers, Tampa Bay Devil Rays, San Francisco Giants	
Ángel Sánchez	September 23, 2006		Utility infielder	Kansas City Royals, Boston Red Sox, Houston Astros	
Aníbal Sánchez	June 25, 2006		Pitcher	Florida Marlins	
Celerino Sánchez	June 13, 1972	September 30, 1973	Third baseman	New York Yankees	
Duaner Sánchez	June 14, 2002		Pitcher	Arizona Diamondbacks, Pittsburgh Pirates, Los Angeles Dodgers, New York Mets, San Diego Padres	
Eduardo Sánchez	April 13, 2011		Pitcher	St. Louis Cardinals	
Félix Sánchez	September 3, 2003	September 20, 2003	Pitcher	Chicago Cubs	
Freddy Sanchez	September 10, 2002		Second baseman	Boston Red Sox, Pittsburgh Pirates, San Francisco Giants	
Gaby Sánchez	September 17, 2008		First baseman	Florida Marlins	
Héctor Sánchez	July 15, 2011		Catcher	San Francisco Giants	
Humberto Sánchez	September 18, 2008		Pitcher	New York Yankees	
Israel Sánchez	July 7, 1988	October 2, 1990	Pitcher	Kansas City Royals	
Jesús Sánchez	March 31, 1998	July 15, 2004	Pitcher	Florida Marlins, Chicago Cubs, Colorado Rockies, Cincinnati Reds	
Jonathan Sánchez	May 28, 2006		Pitcher	San Francisco Giants	
Luis Sánchez	April 10, 1981	October 6, 1985	Pitcher	California Angels	
Orlando Sánchez	May 6, 1981	May 25, 1984	Catcher	St. Louis Cardinals, Kansas City Royals, Baltimore Orioles	
Raúl Sánchez	April 17, 1952	May 17, 1960	Pitcher	Washington Senators, Cincinnati Reds	
Rey Sánchez	September 8, 1991	June 8, 2005	Shortstop	Chicago Cubs, New York Yankees, San Francisco Giants, Kansas City Royals, Atlanta Braves, Boston Red Sox, New York Mets, Seattle Mariners, Tampa Bay Devil Rays	
Rómulo Sánchez	August 26, 2007		Pitcher	Pittsburgh Pirates, New York Yankees	
Heinie Sand	April 17, 1923	September 30, 1928	Shortstop	Philadelphia Phillies	
Gus Sandberg	May 11, 1923	August 8, 1924	Catcher	Cincinnati Reds	
Jared Sandberg	August 7, 2003	September 26, 2003	Third baseman	Tampa Bay Devil Rays	
Ryne Sandberg β	September 2, 1981	September 28, 1997	Second baseman	Philadelphia Phillies, Chicago Cubs	
Anthony Sanders	April 26, 1999	April 18, 2001	Outfielder	Toronto Blue Jays, Seattle Mariners	
Ben Sanders	June 6, 1888	October 14, 1892	Pitcher	Philadelphia Quakers (NL), Philadelphia Quakers (PL), Philadelphia Athletics (1891 AA), Louisville Colonels	
David Sanders	April 23, 2003	September 10, 2005	Pitcher	Chicago White Sox	
Dee Sanders	August 12, 1945	August 13, 1945	Pitcher	St. Louis Browns	
Deion Sanders	May 31, 1989	June 14, 2001	Outfielder	New York Yankees, Atlanta Braves, Cincinnati Reds, San Francisco Giants	
John Sanders	April 13, 1965	April 13, 1965	Pinch runner	Kansas City Athletics	
Ken Sanders	August 6, 1964	September 27, 1976	Pitcher	Kansas City Athletics, Boston Red Sox, Oakland Athletics, Milwaukee Brewers, Minnesota Twins, Cleveland Indians, California Angels, New York Mets, Kansas City Royals	
Ray Sanders	April 14, 1942	September 21, 1949	First baseman	St. Louis Cardinals, Boston Braves	
Reggie Sanders (1B)	September 1, 1974	October 2, 1974	First baseman	Detroit Tigers	
Reggie Sanders (OF)	August 22, 1991	July 29, 2007	Outfielder	Cincinnati Reds, San Diego Padres, Atlanta Braves, Arizona Diamondbacks, San Francisco Giants, Pittsburgh Pirates, St. Louis Cardinals, Kansas City Royals	
Roy Sanders (NL P)	April 16, 1917	August 27, 1918	Pitcher	Cincinnati Reds, Pittsburgh Pirates	
Roy Sanders (AL P)	August 6, 1918	May 31, 1920	Pitcher	New York Yankees, St. Louis Browns	
Scott Sanders	August 6, 1993	October 3, 1999	Pitcher	San Diego Padres, Seattle Mariners, Detroit Tigers, Chicago Cubs	
War Sanders	April 18, 1903	July 4, 1904	Pitcher	St. Louis Cardinals	
Scott Sanderson	August 6, 1978	May 15, 1996	Pitcher	Montreal Expos, Chicago Cubs, Oakland Athletics, New York Yankees, California Angels, San Francisco Giants, Chicago White Sox	
Mike Sandlock	September 19, 1942	September 27, 1953	Catcher	Boston Braves, Brooklyn Dodgers, Pittsburgh Pirates	
Danny Sandoval	July 17, 2005	October 1, 2006	Utility infielder	Philadelphia Phillies	
Freddy Sandoval	September 8, 2008		Utility infielder	Los Angeles Angels of Anaheim	
Pablo Sandoval	August 14, 2008		Utility player	San Francisco Giants	
Charlie Sands	June 21, 1967	May 8, 1975	Designated hitter	New York Yankees, Pittsburgh Pirates, California Angels, Oakland Athletics	
Jerry Sands	April 18, 2011		Outfielder	Los Angeles Dodgers	
Tommy Sandt	June 29, 1975	October 3, 1976	Shortstop	Oakland Athletics	
Chance Sanford	April 30, 1998	June 9, 1999	Utility infielder	Pittsburgh Pirates, Los Angeles Dodgers	
Fred Sanford	May 5, 1943	September 14, 1951	Pitcher	St. Louis Browns, New York Yankees, Washington Senators	
Jack Sanford (1B)	August 24, 1940	May 9, 1946	First baseman	Washington Senators	
Jack Sanford (P)	September 16, 1956	August 6, 1967	Pitcher	Philadelphia Phillies, San Francisco Giants, California Angels, Kansas City Royals	
Mo Sanford	August 9, 1991	June 6, 1995	Pitcher	Cincinnati Reds, Colorado Rockies, Minnesota Twins	
Manny Sanguillén	July 23, 1967	October 5, 1980	Catcher	Pittsburgh Pirates, Oakland Athletics	
Ed Sanicki	September 14, 1949	May 12, 1951	Outfielder	Philadelphia Phillies	
Amauri Sanit	May 12, 2011		Pitcher	New York Yankees	
Ben Sankey	October 5, 1929	September 27, 1931	Shortstop	Pittsburgh Pirates	
Andrés Santana	September 16, 1990	October 3, 1990	Shortstop	San Francisco Giants	
Carlos Santana	June 11, 2010		Catcher	Cleveland Indians	
Ervin Santana	May 17, 2005		Pitcher	Los Angeles Angels of Anaheim	
Johan Santana	April 3, 2000		Pitcher	Minnesota Twins, New York Mets	
Julio Santana	April 6, 1997	May 12, 2006	Pitcher	Texas Rangers, Tampa Bay Devil Rays, Montreal Expos, Detroit Tigers, Milwaukee Brewers, Philadelphia Phillies	
Marino Santana	September 4, 1998	July 23, 1999	Pitcher	Detroit Tigers, Boston Red Sox	
Pedro Santana	July 16, 2001	July 16, 2001	Second baseman	Detroit Tigers	
Rafael Santana	April 5, 1983	April 23, 1990	Shortstop	St. Louis Cardinals, New York Mets, New York Yankees, Cleveland Indians	
F. P. Santangelo	August 2, 1995	October 7, 2001	Outfielder	Montreal Expos, San Francisco Giants, Los Angeles Dodgers, Oakland Athletics	
Benito Santiago	September 14, 1986	April 11, 2005	Catcher	San Diego Padres, Florida Marlins, Cincinnati Reds, Philadelphia Phillies, Toronto Blue Jays, Chicago Cubs, San Francisco Giants, Kansas City Royals, Pittsburgh Pirates	
Hector Santiago	July 6, 2011		Pitcher	Chicago White Sox	
José Santiago (1950s P)	April 17, 1954	July 15, 1956	Pitcher	Cleveland Indians, Kansas City Athletics	
José Santiago (1960s P)	September 9, 1963	July 6, 1970	Pitcher	Kansas City Athletics, Boston Red Sox	
José Santiago (2000s P)	June 7, 1997	August 9, 2005	Pitcher	Kansas City Royals, Philadelphia Phillies, Cleveland Indians, New York Mets	
Ramón Santiago	May 17, 2002		Shortstop	Detroit Tigers, Seattle Mariners	
Ron Santo	June 26, 1960	September 29, 1974	Third baseman	Chicago Cubs, Chicago White Sox	
Rafael Santo Domingo	September 7, 1979	September 30, 1979	Pinch hitter	Cincinnati Reds	
Al Santorini	September 10, 1968	May 5, 1973	Pitcher	Atlanta Braves, San Diego Padres, St. Louis Cardinals	
Ángel Santos	September 8, 2001	September 28, 2003	Second baseman	Boston Red Sox, Cleveland Indians	
Chad Santos	July 16, 2006	July 20, 2006	First baseman	San Francisco Giants	
Francisco Santos	June 18, 2003	July 3, 2003	Outfielder	San Francisco Giants	
Omir Santos	September 5, 2008		Catcher	Baltimore Orioles, New York Mets, Detroit Tigers	
Sergio Santos	April 8, 2010		Pitcher	Chicago White Sox	
Víctor Santos	April 9, 2001		Pitcher	Detroit Tigers, Colorado Rockies, Texas Rangers, Milwaukee Brewers, Pittsburgh Pirates, Cincinnati Reds, Baltimore Orioles	
Nelson Santovenia	September 16, 1987	October 2, 1993	Catcher	Montreal Expos, Chicago White Sox, Kansas City Royals	
Edward Santry	August 7, 1884	August 12, 1884	Shortstop	Detroit Tigers	
Dave Sappelt	August 7, 2011		Outfielder	Cincinnati Reds	
Bronson Sardinha	September 15, 2007		Outfielder	New York Yankees	
Dane Sardinha	September 6, 2003		Catcher	Cincinnati Reds, Detroit Tigers	
Dennis Sarfate	September 3, 2006		Pitcher	Milwaukee Brewers, Houston Astros, Baltimore Orioles	
Joe Sargent	April 27, 1921	September 25, 1921	Utility infielder	Detroit Tigers	
Manny Sarmiento	July 30, 1976	October 1, 1983	Pitcher	Cincinnati Reds, Seattle Mariners, Pittsburgh Pirates	
Bill Sarni	May 9, 1951	September 18, 1956	Catcher	St. Louis Cardinals, New York Giants	
Kazuhiro Sasaki	April 5, 2000	September 28, 2003	Pitcher	Seattle Mariners	
Mackey Sasser	July 17, 1987	May 15, 1995	Catcher	San Francisco Giants, Pittsburgh Pirates, New York Mets, Seattle Mariners	
Rob Sasser	July 31, 1998	July 31, 1998	Pinch hitter	Texas Rangers	
Josh Satin	September 4, 2011		Infielder	New York Mets	
Tom Satriano	July 23, 1961	September 19, 1970	Catcher	Los Angeles/California Angels, Boston Red Sox	
Luis Saturria	September 11, 2000	October 5, 2001	Outfielder	St. Louis Cardinals	
Frank Saucier	July 21, 1951	September 23, 1951	Outfielder	St. Louis Browns	
Kevin Saucier	October 1, 1978	July 25, 1982	Pitcher	Philadelphia Phillies, Detroit Tigers	
Ed Sauer	September 17, 1943	October 2, 1949	Outfielder	Chicago Cubs, St. Louis Cardinals, Boston Braves	
Hank Sauer	September 9, 1941	August 17, 1959	Outfielder	Cincinnati Reds, Chicago Cubs, St. Louis Cardinals, New York/San Francisco Giants	
Scott Sauerbeck	April 5, 1999	September 23, 2006	Pitcher	Pittsburgh Pirates, Boston Red Sox, Cleveland Indians, Oakland Athletics	
Dennis Saunders	May 21, 1970	June 12, 1970	Pitcher	Detroit Tigers	
Doug Saunders	June 13, 1993	October 3, 1993	Second baseman	New York Mets	
Joe Saunders	August 16, 2005		Outfielder	Seattle Mariners, Arizona Diamondbacks	
Michael Saunders	July 25, 2009		Pitcher	Los Angeles Angels of Anaheim	
Rusty Saunders	September 24, 1927	October 2, 1927	Outfielder	Philadelphia Athletics	
Tony Saunders	April 5, 1997	May 26, 1999	Pitcher	Florida Marlins, Tampa Bay Devil Rays	
Al Sauter	September 8, 1890	October 11, 1890	Third baseman	Philadelphia Athletics	
Rich Sauveur	July 1, 1986	June 18, 2000	Pitcher	Pittsburgh Pirates, Montreal Expos, New York Mets, Kansas City Royals, Chicago White Sox, Oakland Athletics	
Bob Savage	June 24, 1942	May 4, 1949	Pitcher	Philadelphia Athletics, St. Louis Browns	
Don Savage	April 18, 1944	September 23, 1945	Third baseman	New York Yankees	
Jack Savage	September 14, 1987	September 14, 1990	Pitcher	Los Angeles Dodgers, Minnesota Twins	
Jimmie Savage	September 3, 1912	October 3, 1915	Outfielder	Philadelphia Phillies, Pittsburgh Rebels	
Ted Savage	April 9, 1962	July 3, 1971	Outfielder	Philadelphia Phillies, Pittsburgh Pirates, St. Louis Cardinals, Chicago Cubs, Los Angeles Dodgers, Cincinnati Reds, Milwaukee Brewers, Kansas City Royals	
Bob Saverine	September 12, 1959	October 1, 1967	Second baseman	Baltimore Orioles, Washington Senators (1961–1971)	
Joe Savery	September 20, 2011		Pitcher	Philadelphia Phillies	
Don Savidge	August 6, 1929	August 31, 1929	Pitcher	Washington Senators	
Ralph Savidge	September 22, 1908	May 19, 1909	Pitcher	Cincinnati Reds	
Moe Savransky	April 23, 1954	September 5, 1954	Pitcher	Cincinnati Redlegs	
Carl Sawatski	September 29, 1948	September 29, 1963	Catcher	Chicago Cubs, Chicago White Sox, Milwaukee Braves, Philadelphia Phillies, St. Louis Cardinals	
Carl Sawyer	September 11, 1915	October 4, 1916	Utility infielder	Washington Senators	
Rick Sawyer	April 28, 1974	September 23, 1977	Pitcher	New York Yankees, San Diego Padres	
Will Sawyer	July 21, 1883	September 29, 1883	Pitcher	Cleveland Blues (NL)	
Dave Sax	September 1, 1982	April 26, 1987	Catcher	Los Angeles Dodgers, Boston Red Sox	
Ollie Sax	April 13, 1928	September 30, 1928	Third baseman	St. Louis Browns	
Steve Sax	August 18, 1981	May 8, 1994	Second baseman	Los Angeles Dodgers, New York Yankees, Chicago White Sox, Oakland Athletics	
Jimmy Say	July 22, 1882	September 6, 1887	Third baseman	Louisville Eclipse, Philadelphia Athletics (AA), Wilmington Quicksteps, Kansas City Cowboys (UA), Cleveland Blues	
Lou Say	April 14, 1873	October 19, 1884	Shortstop	Baltimore Marylands, Baltimore Canaries, Washington Nationals (NA), Cincinnati Reds (1876–1880), Philadelphia Athletics (AA), Baltimore Orioles (19th century), Baltimore Monumentals, Kansas City Cowboys (UA)	
Bill Sayles	July 17, 1939	August 28, 1943	Pitcher	Boston Red Sox, New York Giants, Brooklyn Dodgers	
Phil Saylor	July 11, 1891	July 11, 1891	Pitcher	Philadelphia Phillies	
Jay Sborz	June 22, 2010		Pitcher	Detroit Tigers	
Jerry Scala	April 22, 1948	September 26, 1950	Outfielder	Chicago White Sox	
Bobby Scales	May 5, 2009		Outfielder	Chicago Cubs	
Johnny Scalzi	June 19, 1931	June 24, 1931	Pinch hitter	Boston Braves	
Skeeter Scalzi	July 21, 1939	September 25, 1939	Shortstop	New York Giants	
Bob Scanlan	May 7, 1991	September 29, 2001	Pitcher	Chicago Cubs, Milwaukee Brewers, Detroit Tigers, Kansas City Royals, Houston Astros, Montreal Expos	
Doc Scanlan	September 24, 1903	September 1, 1911	Pitcher	Pittsburgh Pirates, Brooklyn Superbas/Dodgers	
Frank Scanlan	August 6, 1909	September 1, 1909	Pitcher	Philadelphia Phillies	
Mort Scanlan	April 21, 1890	April 23, 1890	First baseman	New York Giants	
Pat Scanlon (OF)	July 4, 1884	July 11, 1884	Outfielder	Boston Reds (UA)	
Pat Scanlon (3B)	September 27, 1974	October 2, 1977	Third baseman	Montreal Expos, San Diego Padres	
Pat Scantlebury	April 19, 1956	August 3, 1956	Pitcher	Cincinnati Reds	
Randy Scarbery	April 16, 1979	May 29, 1980	Pitcher	Chicago White Sox	
Ray Scarborough	June 26, 1942	September 25, 1953	Pitcher	Washington Senators, Chicago White Sox, Boston Red Sox, New York Yankees, Detroit Tigers	
Mac Scarce	July 10, 1972	June 25, 1978	Pitcher	Philadelphia Phillies, New York Mets, Minnesota Twins	
Russ Scarritt	April 18, 1929	May 25, 1932	Outfielder	Boston Red Sox, Philadelphia Phillies	
Les Scarsella	September 15, 1935	May 19, 1940	First baseman	Cincinnati Reds, Boston Braves	
Steve Scarsone	May 15, 1992	September 8, 1999	Utility infielder	Philadelphia Phillies, Baltimore Orioles, San Francisco Giants, St. Louis Cardinals, Kansas City Royals	
Paul Schaal	September 3, 1964	July 19, 1974	Third baseman	Los Angeles/California Angels, Kansas City Royals	
Al Schacht	September 18, 1919	September 6, 1921	Pitcher	Washington Senators	
Sid Schacht	April 23, 1950	June 26, 1951	Pitcher	St. Louis Browns, Boston Braves	
Hal Schacker	May 9, 1945	June 14, 1945	Pitcher	Boston Braves	
Germany Schaefer	October 5, 1901	April 25, 1918	Second baseman	Chicago Orphans, Detroit Tigers, Washington Senators, Newark Peppers, New York Yankees, Cleveland Indians	
Jeff Schaefer	April 7, 1989	June 15, 1994	Utility infielder	Chicago White Sox, Seattle Mariners, Oakland Athletics	
Harry Schaeffer	July 28, 1952	August 20, 1952	Pitcher	New York Yankees	
Mark Schaeffer	April 18, 1972	September 26, 1972	Pitcher	San Diego Padres	
Harry Schafer	May 5, 1871	August 31, 1878	Third baseman	Boston Red Stockings/Red Caps	
Jordan Schafer	April 5, 2009		Outfielder	Atlanta Braves, Houston Astros	
Logan Schafer	September 2, 2011		Outfielder	Milwaukee Brewers	
Jimmie Schaffer	May 20, 1961	July 11, 1968	Catcher	St. Louis Cardinals, Chicago Cubs, Chicago White Sox, New York Mets, Philadelphia Phillies, Cincinnati Reds	
Joe Schaffernoth	April 15, 1959	September 30, 1961	Pitcher	Chicago Cubs, Cleveland Indians	
Johnny Schaive	September 19, 1958	April 19, 1963	Utility infielder	Washington Senators, Washington Senators (1961–1971)	
Ray Schalk β	April 11, 1912	September 15, 1929	Catcher	Chicago White Sox, New York Giants	
Roy Schalk	September 17, 1932	September 9, 1945	Second baseman	Chicago White Sox	
Gene Schall	June 16, 1995	September 29, 1996	First baseman	Philadelphia Phillies	
Biff Schaller	April 30, 1911	July 21, 1913	Outfielder	Detroit Tigers, Chicago White Sox	
Art Schallock	July 16, 1951	September 23, 1955	Pitcher	New York Yankees, Baltimore Orioles	
Bobby Schang	September 23, 1914	May 28, 1927	Catcher	Pittsburgh Pirates, New York Giants, St. Louis Cardinals	
Wally Schang	May 9, 1913	June 22, 1931	Catcher	Philadelphia Athletics, Boston Red Sox, New York Yankees, St. Louis Browns, Detroit Tigers	
Charley Schanz	April 20, 1944	July 2, 1950	Pitcher	Philadelphia Blue Jays/Phillies, Boston Red Sox	
John Schappert	May 3, 1882	July 4, 1882	Pitcher	St. Louis Brown Stockings (AA)	
Bill Schardt	April 14, 1911	May 18, 1912	Pitcher	Brooklyn Dodgers	
Art Scharein	July 6, 1932	June 3, 1934	Third baseman	St. Louis Browns	
George Scharein	April 19, 1937	April 28, 1940	Shortstop	Philadelphia Phillies	
Nick Scharf	May 18, 1882	June 11, 1883	Outfielder	Baltimore Orioles (19th century)	
Jeff Schattinger	September 21, 1981	September 21, 1981	Pitcher	Kansas City Royals	
Dan Schatzeder	September 4, 1977	May 25, 1991	Pitcher	Montreal Expos, Detroit Tigers, New York Giants, Philadelphia Phillies, Minnesota Twins, Cleveland Indians, Houston Astros, New York Mets, Kansas City Royals	
Rube Schauer	August 27, 1913	September 29, 1917	Pitcher	New York Giants, Philadelphia Athletics	
Al Scheer	August 2, 1913	October 3, 1915	Outfielder	Brooklyn Superbas, Indianapolis Hoosiers (FL), Newark Peppers	
Heinie Scheer	April 20, 1922	September 26, 1923	Second baseman	Philadelphia Athletics	
Fritz Scheeren	September 14, 1914	May 11, 1915	Outfielder	Pittsburgh Pirates	
Owen Scheetz	April 22, 1943	May 9, 1943	Pitcher	Washington Senators	
Aaron Scheffer	June 13, 1999	June 20, 1999	Pitcher	Seattle Mariners	
Bob Scheffing	April 27, 1941	September 11, 1951	Catcher	Chicago Cubs, Cincinnati Reds, St. Louis Cardinals	
Ted Scheffler	August 7, 1888	October 15, 1890	Outfielder	Detroit Wolverines, Rochester Broncos	
Lefty Schegg	August 20, 1912	August 27, 1912	Pitcher	Washington Senators	
Carl Scheib	September 6, 1943	May 24, 1954	Pitcher	Philadelphia Athletics, St. Louis Cardinals	
Frank Scheibeck	May 9, 1887	September 13, 1906	Shortstop	Cleveland Blues (AA), Detroit Wolverines, Toledo Maumees, Pittsburgh Pirates, Washington Senators (1891–99), Cleveland Blues (AL), Detroit Tigers	
Jack Scheible	September 8, 1893	September 20, 1894	Pitcher	Cleveland Spiders, Philadelphia Phillies	
Rich Scheid	September 11, 1992	May 12, 1995	Pitcher	Houston Astros, Florida Marlins	
Richie Scheinblum	September 1, 1965	September 21, 1974	Outfielder	Cleveland Indians, Washington Senators (1961–1971), Kansas City Royals, Cincinnati Reds, California Angels, St. Louis Cardinals	
Danny Schell	April 13, 1954	April 22, 1955	Outfielder	Philadelphia Phillies	
Jim Schelle	July 23, 1939	July 23, 1939	Pitcher	Philadelphia Athletics	
Al Schellhase	May 7, 1890	October 4, 1891	Catcher	Boston Beaneaters, Louisville Colonels	
Fred Schemanske	September 15, 1923	October 3, 1923	Pitcher	Washington Senators	
Mike Schemer	August 8, 1945	April 24, 1946	First baseman	New York Giants	
Bill Schenck	May 29, 1882	September 7, 1885	Utility infielder	Louisville Eclipse, Richmond Virginians, Brooklyn Grays	
John Scheneberg	September 23, 1913	September 24, 1920	Pitcher	Pittsburgh Pirates, St. Louis Browns	
Hank Schenz	September 18, 1946	September 13, 1951	Second baseman	Chicago Cubs, Pittsburgh Pirates, New York Giants	
Joe Schepner	September 11, 1919	September 28, 1919	Third baseman	St. Louis Browns	
Bob Scherbarth	April 23, 1950	April 23, 1950	Catcher	Boston Red Sox	
Harry Scherer	July 24, 1889	July 24, 1889	Outfielder	Louisville Colonels	
Fred Scherman	April 26, 1969	July 6, 1976	Pitcher	Detroit Tigers, Houston Astros, Montreal Expos	
Bill Scherrer	September 7, 1982	July 28, 1988	Pitcher	Cincinnati Reds, Detroit Tigers, Baltimore Orioles, Philadelphia Phillies	
Max Scherzer	April 29, 2008		Pitcher	Arizona Diamondbacks, Detroit Tigers	
Dutch Schesler	April 16, 1931	August 12, 1931	Pitcher	Philadelphia Phillies	
Lou Schettler	April 25, 1910	October 1, 1910	Pitcher	Philadelphia Phillies	
Lou Schiappacasse	September 7, 1902	September 8, 1902	Outfielder	Detroit Tigers	
Morrie Schick	April 15, 1917	September 29, 1917	Outfielder	Chicago Cubs	
Nate Schierholtz	June 11, 2007		Outfielder	San Francisco Giants	
Chuck Schilling	April 11, 1961	October 3, 1965	Second baseman	Boston Red Sox	
Curt Schilling	September 7, 1988	September 25, 2007	Pitcher	Baltimore Orioles, Houston Astros, Philadelphia Phillies, Arizona Diamondbacks, Boston Red Sox	
Red Schillings	September 11, 1922	September 28, 1922	Pitcher	Philadelphia Athletics	
Bill Schindler	September 3, 1920	September 3, 1920	Catcher	St. Louis Cardinals	
Calvin Schiraldi	September 1, 1984	July 3, 1991	Pitcher	New York Mets, Boston Red Sox, Chicago Cubs, San Diego Padres, Texas Rangers	
Dutch Schirick	September 17, 1914	September 17, 1914	Pinch hitter	St. Louis Browns	
Larry Schlafly	September 18, 1902	October 10, 1914	Second baseman	Chicago Cubs, Washington Senators, Buffalo Buffeds	
Admiral Schlei	April 24, 1904	April 24, 1911	Catcher	Cincinnati Reds, New York Giants	
Daniel Schlereth	May 29, 2009		Pitcher	Arizona Diamondbacks, Detroit Tigers	
Rudy Schlesinger	May 4, 1965	May 4, 1965	Pinch hitter	Boston Red Sox	
Travis Schlichting	June 7, 2009		Pitcher	Los Angeles Dodgers	
Dutch Schliebner	April 17, 1923	October 7, 1923	First baseman	Brooklyn Robins, St. Louis Browns	
Brian Schlitter	June 28, 2010		Pitcher	Chicago Cubs	
Biff Schlitzer	April 17, 1908	May 1, 1914	Pitcher	Philadelphia Athletics, Boston Red Sox, Buffalo Buffeds	
Jay Schlueter	June 18, 1971	July 25, 1971	Outfielder	Houston Astros	
Norm Schlueter	May 28, 1938	October 1, 1944	Catcher	Chicago White Sox, Cleveland Indians	
Brian Schmack	August 24, 2003	September 27, 2003	Pitcher	Detroit Tigers	
Ray Schmandt	June 24, 1915	October 1, 1922	First baseman	St. Louis Browns, Brooklyn Robins	
George Schmees	April 15, 1952	September 28, 1952	Outfielder	St. Louis Browns, Boston Red Sox	
Al Schmelz	September 7, 1967	September 24, 1967	Pitcher	New York Mets	
Bob Schmidt	April 16, 1958	June 9, 1965	Catcher	San Francisco Giants, Cincinnati Reds, Washington Senators (1961–1971), New York Yankees	
Boss Schmidt	April 30, 1906	October 8, 1911	Catcher	Detroit Tigers	
Butch Schmidt	May 11, 1909	September 10, 1915	First baseman	New York Highlanders, Boston Braves	
Curt Schmidt	April 28, 1995	September 29, 1995	Pitcher	Montreal Expos	
Dave Schmidt (P)	May 1, 1981	May 26, 1992	Pitcher	Texas Rangers, Chicago White Sox, Baltimore Orioles, Montreal Expos, Seattle Mariners	
Dave Schmidt (C)	April 28, 1981	June 3, 1981	Catcher	Boston Red Sox	
Freddy Schmidt	April 25, 1944	September 24, 1947	Pitcher	St. Louis Cardinals, Philadelphia Phillies, Chicago Cubs	
Henry Schmidt	April 17, 1903	September 22, 1903	Pitcher	Brooklyn Superbas	
Jason Schmidt	April 28, 1995		Pitcher	Atlanta Braves, Pittsburgh Pirates, San Francisco Giants, Los Angeles Dodgers	
Jeff Schmidt	May 17, 1996	July 30, 1996	Pitcher	California Angels	
Konrad Schmidt	September 13, 2010		Catcher	Arizona Diamondbacks	
Mike Schmidt β	September 12, 1972	May 28, 1989	Third baseman	Philadelphia Phillies	
Pete Schmidt	July 14, 1913	July 14, 1913	Pitcher	St. Louis Browns	
Walter Schmidt	April 13, 1916	September 7, 1925	Catcher	Pittsburgh Pirates, St. Louis Cardinals	
Willard Schmidt	April 19, 1952	September 26, 1959	Pitcher	St. Louis Cardinals, Cincinnati Reds	
Crazy Schmit	April 21, 1890	June 8, 1901	Pitcher	Pittsburgh Alleghenys, Baltimore Orioles (19th century), New York Giants, Cleveland Spiders, Baltimore Orioles (1901–02)	
Johnny Schmitz	September 6, 1941	September 7, 1956	Pitcher	Chicago Cubs, Brooklyn Dodgers, New York Yankees, Cincinnati Reds, Washington Senators, Boston Red Sox, Baltimore Orioles	
Steve Schmoll	April 6, 2005	October 2, 2005	Pitcher	Los Angeles Dodgers	
Hank Schmulbach	September 27, 1943	September 27, 1943	Pinch runner	St. Louis Browns	
Charlie Schmutz	May 13, 1914	April 14, 1915	Pitcher	Brooklyn Robins	
Dave Schneck	July 14, 1972	October 1, 1974	Outfielder	New York Mets	
Frank Schneiberg	June 8, 1910	June 8, 1910	Pitcher	Brooklyn Superbas	
Brian Schneider	May 26, 2000		Catcher	Montreal Expos, Washington Nationals, New York Mets, Philadelphia Phillies	
Dan Schneider	May 12, 1963	April 27, 1969	Pitcher	Milwaukee/Atlanta Braves, Houston Astros	
Jeff Schneider	August 12, 1981	October 2, 1981	Pitcher	Baltimore Orioles	
Pete Schneider	June 20, 1914	August 2, 1919	Pitcher	Cincinnati Reds, New York Yankees	
Karl Schnell	April 24, 1922	April 19, 1923	Pitcher	Cincinnati Reds	
Gerry Schoen	September 14, 1968	September 14, 1968	Pitcher	Washington Senators (1961–1971)	
Red Schoendienst β	April 17, 1945	July 7, 1963	Second baseman	St. Louis Cardinals, New York Giants, Milwaukee Braves	
Jumbo Schoeneck	April 20, 1884	May 11, 1889	First baseman	Chicago Browns/Pittsburgh Stogies, Baltimore Monumentals, Indianapolis Hoosiers (NL)	
Scott Schoeneweis	April 7, 1999		Pitcher	Anaheim Angels, Chicago White Sox, Toronto Blue Jays, Cincinnati Reds, New York Mets, Arizona Diamondbacks, Boston Red Sox	
Dick Schofield	September 8, 1983	September 29, 1996	Shortstop	California Angels, New York Mets, Toronto Blue Jays, Los Angeles Dodgers	
Ducky Schofield	July 5, 1953	September 30, 1971	Shortstop	St. Louis Cardinals, Pittsburgh Pirates, San Francisco Giants, New York Yankees, Los Angeles Dodgers, Boston Red Sox, Milwaukee Brewers	
Otto Schomberg	July 7, 1886	July 14, 1888	First baseman	Pittsburgh Alleghenys, Indianapolis Hoosiers (NL)	
Mike Schooler	June 10, 1988	September 3, 1993	Pitcher	Seattle Mariners, Texas Rangers	
Jerry Schoonmaker	June 11, 1955	September 29, 1957	Outfielder	Washington Senators	
Ed Schorr	April 26, 1915	September 23, 1915	Pitcher	Chicago Cubs	
Gene Schott	April 16, 1935	June 20, 1939	Pitcher	Cincinnati Reds, Philadelphia Phillies	
Pete Schourek	April 9, 1991	July 25, 2001	Pitcher	New York Mets, Cincinnati Reds, Houston Astros, Boston Red Sox, Pittsburgh Pirates	
Paul Schramka	April 14, 1953	April 16, 1953	Outfielder	Chicago Cubs	
Ossee Schreckengost	September 8, 1897	October 2, 1908	Catcher	Louisville Colonels, Cleveland Spiders, St. Louis Perfectos, Boston Americans, Cleveland Bronchos, Philadelphia Athletics, Chicago White sox	
Barney Schreiber	May 15, 1911	June 4, 1911	Pitcher	Cincinnati Reds	
Hank Schreiber	April 14, 1914	August 5, 1926	Third baseman	Chicago White Sox, Boston Braves, Cincinnati Reds, New York Giants, Chicago Cubs	
Paul Schreiber	September 2, 1922	September 8, 1945	Pitcher	Brooklyn Robins, New York Yankees	
Ted Schreiber	April 14, 1963	September 29, 1963	Third baseman	New York Mets	
Steve Schrenk	July 3, 1999	July 16, 2000	Pitcher	Philadelphia Phillies	
Pop Schriver	April 29, 1886	October 6, 1901	Catcher	Brooklyn Grays, Philadelphia Quakers (NL), Chicago Colts, New York Giants, Cincinnati Reds, Pittsburgh Pirates, St. Louis Cardinals	
Bob Schroder	April 20, 1965	September 29, 1968	Second baseman	San Francisco Giants	
Chris Schroder	August 8, 2006		Pitcher	Washington Nationals	
Bill Schroeder	July 13, 1983	September 9, 1990	Catcher	Milwaukee Brewers, California Angels	
Al Schroll	April 20, 1958	October 1, 1961	Pitcher	Boston Red Sox, Philadelphia Phillies, Chicago Cubs, Minnesota Twins	
Ken Schrom	August 8, 1980	October 3, 1987	Pitcher	Toronto Blue Jays, Minnesota Twins, Cleveland Indians	
Rick Schu	September 1, 1984	August 14, 1996	Third baseman	Philadelphia Phillies, Baltimore Orioles, Detroit Tigers, California Angels, Montreal Expos	
Heinie Schuble	July 8, 1927	May 15, 1936	Shortstop	St. Louis Cardinals, Detroit Tigers	
Ron Schueler	April 16, 1972	July 4, 1979	Pitcher	Atlanta Braves, Philadelphia Phillies, Minnesota Twins, Chicago White Sox	
Dave Schuler	September 17, 1979	October 2, 1985	Pitcher	California Angels, Atlanta Braves	
Erik Schullstrom	July 18, 1994	September 27, 1995	Pitcher	Minnesota Twins	
Wes Schulmerich	May 1, 1931	September 30, 1934	Outfielder	Boston Braves, Philadelphia Phillies, Cincinnati Reds	
Art Schult	May 17, 1953	May 27, 1960	Utility infielder	New York Yankees, Cincinnati Reds, Washington Senators, Chicago Cubs	
Frank Schulte	September 21, 1904	September 2, 1918	Outfielder	Chicago Cubs, Pittsburgh Pirates, Philadelphia Phillies, Washington Senators	
Fred Schulte	April 15, 1927	October 3, 1937	Outfielder	St. Louis Browns, Washington Senators, Pittsburgh Pirates	
Ham Schulte	April 16, 1940	September 29, 1940	Second baseman	Philadelphia Phillies	
Jack Schulte	August 19, 1906	August 19, 1906	Shortstop	Boston Beaneaters	
Johnny Schulte	April 18, 1923	September 20, 1932	Catcher	St. Louis Browns, St. Louis Cardinals, Philadelphia Phillies, Chicago Cubs, Boston Braves	
Len Schulte	September 27, 1944	June 16, 1946	Third baseman	St. Louis Browns	
Barney Schultz	April 12, 1955	September 6, 1965	Pitcher	St. Louis Cardinals, Detroit Tigers, Chicago Cubs	
Bob Schultz	April 20, 1951	April 15, 1955	Pitcher	Chicago Cubs, Pittsburgh Pirates, Detroit Tigers	
Buddy Schultz	September 3, 1975	September 28, 1979	Pitcher	Chicago Cubs, St. Louis Cardinals	
Howie Schultz	August 16, 1943	September 8, 1948	First baseman	Brooklyn Dodgers, Philadelphia Phillies, Cincinnati Reds	
Joe Schultz (OF)	September 28, 1912	October 4, 1925	Outfielder	Boston Braves, Brooklyn Robins, Chicago Cubs, Pittsburgh Pirates, St. Louis Cardinals, Philadelphia Phillies, Cincinnati Reds	
Joe Schultz (C)	September 27, 1939	September 23, 1948	Catcher	Pittsburgh Pirates, St. Louis Browns	
John Schultz (P)	May 6, 1891	June 11, 1891	Catcher	Philadelphia Phillies	
Mike Schultz (LHP)	April 20, 1947	April 20, 1947	Pitcher	Cincinnati Reds	
Mike Schultz (RHP)	April 20, 2007		Pitcher	Arizona Diamondbacks	
Webb Schultz	August 3, 1924	August 3, 1924	Pitcher	Chicago White Sox	
Al Schulz	September 25, 1912	September 23, 1916	Pitcher	New York Highlanders, Buffalo Buffeds/Blues, Cincinnati Reds	
Jeff Schulz	September 2, 1989	May 15, 1991	Outfielder	Kansas City Royals, Pittsburgh Pirates	
Walt Schulz	September 24, 1920	September 24, 1920	Pitcher	St. Louis Cardinals	
Don Schulze	September 13, 1983	September 29, 1989	Pitcher	Chicago Cubs, Cleveland Indians, New York Mets, New York Yankees, San Diego Padres	
John Schulze	August 7, 1891	August 7, 1891	Catcher	St. Louis Browns (1882–1900)	
Hal Schumacher	April 15, 1931	September 26, 1946	Pitcher	New York Giants	
Skip Schumaker	June 8, 2005		Outfielder	St. Louis Cardinals	
Hack Schumann	September 19, 1906	October 3, 1906	Pitcher	Philadelphia Athletics	
Ferdie Schupp	August 19, 1913	July 27, 1922	Pitcher	San Francisco Giants, St. Louis Cardinals, Brooklyn Robins, Chicago White Sox	
Wayne Schurr	April 15, 1964	July 11, 1964	Pitcher	Chicago Cubs	
Bill Schuster	September 29, 1937	September 29, 1945	Shortstop	Pittsburgh Pirates, Boston Braves, Chicago Cubs	
Carl Schutz	September 3, 1996	September 24, 1996	Pitcher	Atlanta Braves	
Mike Schwabe	May 27, 1989	July 20, 1990	Pitcher	Detroit Tigers	
Don Schwall	May 21, 1961	April 12, 1967	Pitcher	Boston Red Sox, Pittsburgh Pirates, Atlanta Braves	
Ralph Schwamb	July 25, 1948	September 18, 1948	Pitcher	St. Louis Browns	
Bill Schwartz (C)	May 3, 1883	August 7, 1884	Catcher	Columbus Buckeyes, Cincinnati Outlaw Reds	
Bill Schwartz (1B)	May 2, 1904	June 16, 1904	First baseman	Cleveland Naps	
Randy Schwartz	September 8, 1965	September 24, 1966	First baseman	Kansas City Athletics	
Jeff Schwarz	April 24, 1993	August 6, 1994	Pitcher	Chicago White Sox, California Angels	
Al Schweitzer	April 30, 1908	October 8, 1911	Outfielder	St. Louis Browns	
Rudy Schwenck	September 23, 1908	October 6, 1908	Pitcher	Chicago Cubs	
Hal Schwenk	September 4, 1913	September 4, 1913	Pitcher	St. Louis Browns	
Pi Schwert	October 6, 1914	October 7, 1915	Catcher	New York Yankees	
Michael Schwimer	August 21, 2011		Pitcher	Philadelphia Phillies	
Art Schwind	October 3, 1912	October 3, 1912	Third baseman	Boston Braves	
Chris Schwinden	September 8, 2011		Pitcher	New York Mets	
Jerry Schypinski	August 31, 1955	September 25, 1955	Shortstop	Kansas City Athletics	
Mike Scioscia	April 20, 1980	October 2, 1992	Catcher	Los Angeles Dodgers	
Lou Scoffic	April 16, 1936	May 9, 1936	Outfielder	St. Louis Cardinals	
Jim Scoggins	August 26, 1913	August 26, 1913	Pitcher	Chicago White Sox	
Daryl Sconiers	September 13, 1981	October 6, 1985	First baseman	California Angels	
Herb Score	April 15, 1955	May 4, 1962	Pitcher	Cleveland Indians, Chicago White Sox	
Scott, first name unknown	July 16, 1884	August 5, 1884	Outfielder	Baltimore Monumentals	
Darryl Scott	May 31, 1993	October 1, 1993	Pitcher	California Angels	
Dick Scott (RHP)	June 26, 1901	July 8, 1901	Pitcher	Cincinnati Reds	
Dick Scott (LHP)	May 8, 1963	July 10, 1964	Pitcher	Los Angeles Dodgers, Chicago Cubs	
Dick Scott (SS)	May 19, 1989	May 29, 1989	Shortstop	Oakland Athletics	
Donnie Scott	September 30, 1983	October 4, 1991	Catcher	Texas Rangers, Seattle Mariners, Cincinnati Reds	
Ed Scott	April 19, 1900	August 3, 1901	Pitcher	Cincinnati Reds, Cleveland Blues (AL)	
Everett Scott	April 14, 1914	July 27, 1926	Shortstop	Boston Red Sox, New York Yankees, Washington Senators, Chicago White Sox, Cincinnati Reds	
Gary Scott	April 9, 1991	October 3, 1992	Third baseman	Chicago Cubs	
George Scott (P)	September 13, 1920	September 13, 1920	Pitcher	St. Louis Cardinals	
George Scott (1B)	April 12, 1966	September 27, 1979	First baseman	Boston Red Sox, Milwaukee Brewers, Kansas City Royals, New York Yankees	
Jack Scott	September 6, 1916	September 22, 1929	Pitcher	Pittsburgh Pirates, Boston Braves, Cincinnati Reds, New York Giants	
Jim Scott (P)	April 25, 1909	August 17, 1917	Pitcher	Chicago White Sox	
Jim Scott (SS)	April 22, 1914	May 1, 1914	Shortstop	Pittsburgh Rebels	
John Scott	September 7, 1974	September 27, 1977	Outfielder	San Diego Padres, Toronto Blue Jays	
Lefty Scott	June 15, 1945	July 12, 1945	Pitcher	Philadelphia Phillies	
LeGrant Scott	April 19, 1939	August 5, 1939	Outfielder	Philadelphia Phillies	
Luke Scott	April 5, 2005		Outfielder	Houston Astros, Baltimore Orioles	
Mickey Scott	May 6, 1972	June 6, 1977	Pitcher	Baltimore Orioles, Montreal Expos, California Angels	
Mike Scott	April 18, 1979	April 13, 1991	Pitcher	New York Mets, Houston Astros	
Milt Scott	September 30, 1882	October 14, 1886	First baseman	Chicago White Stockings, Detroit Wolverines, Pittsburgh Alleghenys, Baltimore Orioles (19th century)	
Pete Scott	April 13, 1926	September 27, 1928	Outfielder	Chicago Cubs, Pittsburgh Pirates	
Rodney Scott	April 11, 1975	August 21, 1982	Second baseman	Kansas City Royals, Montreal Expos, Oakland Athletics, Chicago Cubs, New York Yankees	
Tim Scott	June 25, 1991	July 2, 1997	Pitcher	San Diego Padres, Montreal Expos, San Francisco Giants, Colorado Rockies	
Tony Scott	September 1, 1973	September 21, 1984	Outfielder	Montreal Expos, St. Louis Cardinals, Houston Astros	
Jim Scranton	September 5, 1984	October 6, 1985	Shortstop	Kansas City Royals	
Evan Scribner	April 26, 2011		Pitcher	San Diego Padres	
Chuck Scrivener	September 18, 1975	September 29, 1977	Shortstop	Detroit Tigers	
Tony Scruggs	April 8, 1991	April 20, 1991	Outfielder	Texas Rangers	
Scott Scudder	June 6, 1989	May 22, 1993	Pitcher	Cincinnati Reds, Cleveland Indians	
Rod Scurry	April 17, 1980	September 30, 1988	Pitcher	Pittsburgh Pirates, New York Yankees, Seattle Mariners	
Marco Scutaro	July 21, 2002		Utility infielder	New York Mets, Oakland Athletics, Toronto Blue Jays, Boston Red Sox	
Scott Seabol	April 8, 2001	September 30, 2005	Third baseman	New York Yankees, St. Louis Cardinals	
Kyle Seager	July 7, 2011		Infielder	Seattle Mariners	
Johnnie Seale	September 20, 1964	May 2, 1965	Pitcher	Detroit Tigers	
Kim Seaman	September 28, 1979	September 27, 1980	Pitcher	St. Louis Cardinals	
Rudy Seánez	September 7, 1989		Pitcher	Cleveland Indians, San Diego Padres, Los Angeles Dodgers, Atlanta Braves, Texas Rangers, Boston Red Sox, Kansas City Royals, Florida Marlins, Philadelphia Phillies	
Ray Searage	June 11, 1981	September 30, 1990	Pitcher	New York Mets, Milwaukee Brewers, Chicago White Sox, Los Angeles Dodgers	
Steve Searcy	August 29, 1988	June 1, 1992	Pitcher	Detroit Tigers, Philadelphia Phillies	
Ken Sears	May 2, 1943	July 3, 1946	Catcher	New York Yankees, St. Louis Browns	
Todd Sears	September 17, 2002	September 27, 2003	First baseman	Minnesota Twins, San Diego Padres	
Tom Seaton	April 13, 1912	June 23, 1917	Pitcher	Philadelphia Phillies, Brooklyn Tip-Tops, Newark Peppers, Chicago Cubs	
Tom Seats	May 4, 1940	September 28, 1945	Pitcher	Detroit Tigers, Brooklyn Dodgers	
Tom Seaver β	April 13, 1967	September 19, 1986	Pitcher	New York Mets, Cincinnati Reds, Chicago White Sox, Boston Red Sox	
Bobby Seay	August 14, 2001		Pitcher	Tampa Bay Devil Rays, Colorado Rockies, Detroit Tigers	
Bob Sebra	June 26, 1985	June 30, 1990	Pitcher	Texas Rangers, Montreal Expos, Philadelphia Phillies, Cincinnati Reds, Milwaukee Brewers	
Jimmy Sebring	September 8, 1902	August 6, 1909	Outfielder	Pittsburgh Pirates, Cincinnati Reds, Brooklyn Superbas, Washington Senators	
Doc Sechrist	April 28, 1899	April 28, 1899	Pitcher	New York Giants	
Frank Secory	April 28, 1940	August 10, 1946	Outfielder	Detroit Tigers, Cincinnati Reds, Chicago Cubs	
Don Secrist	April 11, 1969	June 27, 1970	Pitcher	Chicago White Sox	
Chris Seddon	September 3, 2007		Pitcher	Florida Marlins, Seattle Mariners	
Duke Sedgwick	July 12, 1921	July 30, 1923	Pitcher	Philadelphia Phillies, Washington Senators	
Shawn Sedlacek	June 18, 2002	September 27, 2002	Pitcher	Kansas City Royals	
Charlie See	August 6, 1919	July 8, 1921	Outfielder	Cincinnati Reds	
Larry See	September 3, 1986	August 16, 1988	First baseman	Los Angeles Dodgers, Texas Rangers	
Bob Seeds	April 19, 1930	September 24, 1940	Outfielder	Cleveland Indians, Chicago White Sox, Boston Red Sox, New York Yankees, New York Giants	
Chris Seelbach	September 9, 2000	May 20, 2001	Pitcher	Atlanta Braves	
Chuck Seelbach	June 29, 1971	May 23, 1974	Pitcher	Detroit Tigers	
Pat Seerey	June 9, 1943	May 7, 1949	Outfielder	Cleveland Indians, Chicago White Sox	
Emmett Seery	April 17, 1884	June 10, 1892	Outfielder	Baltimore Monumentals, Kansas City Cowboys (UA), St. Louis Maroons, Indianapolis Hoosiers (NL), Brooklyn Ward's Wonders, Cincinnati Kelly's Killers, Louisville Colonels	
Kevin Sefcik	September 8, 1995	June 1, 2001	Outfielder	Philadelphia Phillies, Colorado Rockies	
Herman Segelke	April 7, 1982	April 23, 1982	Pitcher	Chicago Cubs	
Zack Segovia	April 8, 2007		Pitcher	Philadelphia Phillies, Washington Nationals	
Kal Segrist	July 16, 1952	September 25, 1955	Second baseman	New York Yankees, Baltimore Orioles	
David Segui	May 8, 1990	September 8, 2004	First baseman	Baltimore Orioles, New York Mets, Montreal Expos, Seattle Mariners, Toronto Blue Jays, Texas Rangers, Cleveland Indians	
Diego Seguí	April 12, 1962	September 24, 1977	Pitcher	Kansas City Athletics, Washington Senators (1961–1971), Oakland Athletics, Seattle Pilots, St. Louis Cardinals, Boston Red Sox, Seattle Mariners	
Fernando Seguignol	September 5, 1998	September 28, 2003	Utility player	Montreal Expos, New York Yankees	
José Segura	April 10, 1988	July 4, 1991	Pitcher	Chicago White Sox, San Francisco Giants	
Phil Seibel	April 15, 2004	April 18, 2004	Pitcher	Boston Red Sox	
Kurt Seibert	September 3, 1979	September 30, 1979	Second baseman	Chicago Cubs	
Socks Seibold	September 18, 1915	June 13, 1933	Pitcher	Philadelphia Athletics, Boston Braves	
Ricky Seilheimer	July 5, 1980	August 8, 1980	Catcher	Chicago White Sox	
Kevin Seitzer	September 3, 1986	September 28, 1997	Third baseman	Kansas City Royals, Milwaukee Brewers, Oakland Athletics, Cleveland Indians	
Kip Selbach	April 24, 1894	June 29, 1906	Outfielder	Washington Senators (1891–99), Cincinnati Reds, New York Giants, Baltimore Orioles (1901–1902), Washington Senators, Boston Americans	
Bill Selby	April 19, 1996	May 25, 2003	Utility player	Boston Red Sox, Cleveland Indians, Cincinnati Reds	
Aaron Sele	June 23, 1993	September 23, 2007	Pitcher	Boston Red Sox, Texas Rangers, Seattle Mariners, Anaheim Angels, Los Angeles Dodgers, New York Mets	
Todd Self	May 12, 2005	June 9, 2005	Outfielder	Houston Astros	
George Selkirk	August 12, 1934	September 27, 1942	Outfielder	New York Yankees	
Epp Sell	September 1, 1922	May 29, 1923	Pitcher	St. Louis Cardinals	
Jeff Sellers	September 15, 1985	October 1, 1988	Pitcher	Boston Red Sox	
Justin Sellers	August 12, 2011		Infielder	Los Angeles Dodgers	
Rube Sellers	August 12, 1910	October 4, 1910	Outfielder	Boston Doves	
Frank Sellman	May 4, 1871	May 3, 1875	Utility player	Fort Wayne Kekiongas, Washington Olympics, Baltimore Marylands, Baltimore Canaries, Washington Nationals (NA)	
Dave Sells	August 2, 1972	September 22, 1975	Pitcher	California Angels, Los Angeles Dodgers	
Dick Selma	September 2, 1965	August 9, 1974	Pitcher	New York Mets, San Diego Padres, Chicago Cubs, Philadelphia Phillies, California Angels, Milwaukee Brewers	
Carey Selph	May 25, 1929	September 18, 1932	Third baseman	St. Louis Cardinals, Chicago White Sox	
Mike Sember	August 18, 1977	October 1, 1978	Third baseman	Chicago Cubs	
Carroll Sembera	September 28, 1965	April 26, 1970	Pitcher	Houston Astros, Montreal Expos	
Frank Seminara	June 2, 1992	June 5, 1994	Pitcher	San Diego Padres, New York Mets	
Andy Seminick	September 14, 1943	September 21, 1957	Catcher	Philadelphia Phillies, Cincinnati Reds	
Ray Semproch	April 15, 1958	May 2, 1961	Pitcher	Philadelphia Phillies, Detroit Tigers, Los Angeles Angels	
Sonny Senerchia	August 22, 1952	September 28, 1952	Third baseman	Pittsburgh Pirates	
Count Sensenderfer	May 20, 1871	October 21, 1874	Outfielder	Philadelphia Athletics (1860–76)	
Paul Sentell	April 12, 1906	April 27, 1907	Third baseman	Philadelphia Phillies	
Steve Senteney	June 6, 1982	September 30, 1982	Pitcher	Toronto Blue Jays	
Jae Weong Seo	July 21, 2002		Pitcher	New York Mets, Los Angeles Dodgers, Tampa Bay Devil Rays	
Manny Seoane	September 18, 1977	September 30, 1978	Pitcher	Philadelphia Phillies, Chicago Cubs	
Ted Sepkowski	September 9, 1942	June 21, 1947	Utility infielder	Cleveland Indians, New York Yankees	
Billy Serad	May 5, 1884	July 7, 1888	Pitcher	Buffalo Bisons (NL), Cincinnati Red Stockings (AA)	
Dan Serafini	June 25, 1996		Pitcher	Minnesota Twins, Chicago Cubs, San Diego Padres, Pittsburgh Pirates, Cincinnati Reds, Colorado Rockies	
Bill Serena	September 16, 1949	August 7, 1954	Third baseman	Chicago Cubs	
Paul Serna	September 1, 1981	October 3, 1982	Shortstop	Seattle Mariners	
Alex Serrano	April 16, 2008		Pitcher	Los Angeles Angels of Anaheim	
Jimmy Serrano	August 7, 2004	October 3, 2008	Pitcher	Kansas City Royals	
Wascar Serrano	May 12, 2001	October 5, 2001	Pitcher	San Diego Padres	
Gary Serum	July 22, 1977	September 29, 1979	Pitcher	Minnesota Twins	
Scott Servais	July 12, 1991	September 21, 2001	Catcher	Houston Astros, Chicago Cubs, Colorado Rockies, San Francisco Giants	
Scott Service	September 5, 1988	September 26, 2004	Pitcher	Philadelphia Phillies, Montreal Expos, Colorado Rockies, Cincinnati Reds, San Francisco Giants, Kansas City Royals, Oakland Athletics, Arizona Diamondbacks, Toronto Blue Jays	
Walter Sessi	September 18, 1941	September 27, 1946	Outfielder	St. Louis Cardinals	
Merle Settlemire	April 13, 1928	September 29, 1928	Pitcher	Boston Red Sox	
John Sevcik	April 24, 1965	October 3, 1965	Catcher	Minnesota Twins	
Hank Severeid	May 15, 1911	July 27, 1926	Catcher	Cincinnati Reds, St. Louis Browns, Washington Senators, New York Yankees	
Atahualpa Severino	September 6, 2011		Pitcher	Washington Nationals	
Al Severinsen	July 1, 1969	September 14, 1972	Pitcher	Baltimore Orioles, San Diego Padres	
Rich Severson	April 10, 1970	September 29, 1971	Shortstop	Kansas City Royals	
Ed Seward	September 30, 1885	June 8, 1891	Pitcher	Providence Grays, Philadelphia Athletics (AA), Cleveland Spiders	
Frank Seward	September 28, 1943	September 22, 1944	Pitcher	New York Giants	
George Seward	May 19, 1875	August 8, 1882	Outfielder	St. Louis Brown Stockings, New York Mutuals, St. Louis Brown Stockings (AA)	
Joe Sewell β	September 10, 1920	September 24, 1933	Shortstop	Cleveland Indians, New York Yankees	
Luke Sewell	June 30, 1921	August 1, 1942	Catcher	Cleveland Indians, Washington Senators, Chicago White Sox, St. Louis Browns	
Rip Sewell	June 14, 1932	September 18, 1949	Pitcher	Detroit Tigers, Pittsburgh Pirates	
Tommy Sewell	June 21, 1927	June 21, 1927	Pinch hitter	Chicago Cubs	
Elmer Sexauer	September 6, 1948	September 12, 1948	Pitcher	Brooklyn Dodgers	
Richie Sexson	September 14, 1997	August 13, 2008	First baseman	Cleveland Indians, Milwaukee Brewers, Arizona Diamondbacks, Seattle Mariners, New York Yankees	
Chris Sexton	May 3, 1999	October 1, 2000	Utility player	Colorado Rockies, Cincinnati Reds	
Frank Sexton	June 21, 1895	August 17, 1895	Pitcher	Boston Beaneaters	
Jimmy Sexton	September 2, 1977	October 2, 1983	Shortstop	Seattle Mariners, Houston Astros, Oakland Athletics, St. Louis Cardinals	
Tom Sexton	September 27, 1884	October 12, 1884	Shortstop	Milwaukee Brewers (UA)	
Socks Seybold	August 20, 1899	October 7, 1908	Outfielder	Cincinnati Reds, Philadelphia Athletics	
Gordon Seyfried	September 13, 1963	April 28, 1964	Pitcher	Cleveland Indians	
Cy Seymour	April 22, 1896	July 17, 1913	Outfielder	New York Giants, Baltimore Orioles (1901–1902), Cincinnati Reds, Boston Braves	
Jake Seymour	September 23, 1882	September 23, 1882	Pitcher	Pittsburgh Alleghenys	
