= 1929 Washington Senators season =

1929 Washington Senators
- League: American League
- Ballpark: Griffith Stadium
- City: Washington, D.C.
- Record: 71–81 (.467)
- League place: 5th
- Owners: Clark Griffith and William Richardson
- Managers: Walter Johnson

The 1929 Washington Senators won 71 games, lost 81, and finished in fifth place in the American League. They were managed by Walter Johnson and played home games at Griffith Stadium.

== Regular season ==
=== Season standings ===
American League
| Team | W | L | Pct. | GB | Home | Road |
|---|---|---|---|---|---|---|
| Philadelphia Athletics | 104 | 46 | .693 | — | 57‍–‍16 | 47‍–‍30 |
| New York Yankees | 88 | 66 | .571 | 18 | 49‍–‍28 | 39‍–‍38 |
| Cleveland Indians | 81 | 71 | .533 | 24 | 44‍–‍32 | 37‍–‍39 |
| St. Louis Browns | 79 | 73 | .520 | 26 | 41‍–‍36 | 38‍–‍37 |
| Washington Senators | 71 | 81 | .467 | 34 | 37‍–‍40 | 34‍–‍41 |
| Detroit Tigers | 70 | 84 | .455 | 36 | 38‍–‍39 | 32‍–‍45 |
| Chicago White Sox | 59 | 93 | .388 | 46 | 35‍–‍41 | 24‍–‍52 |
| Boston Red Sox | 58 | 96 | .377 | 48 | 32‍–‍45 | 26‍–‍51 |

=== Record vs. opponents ===
1929 American League record Sources:
| Team | BOS | CWS | CLE | DET | NYY | PHA | SLB | WSH |
|---|---|---|---|---|---|---|---|---|
| Boston | — | 11–11 | 9–13 | 8–14 | 5–17 | 4–18 | 11–11–1 | 10–12 |
| Chicago | 11–11 | — | 9–12 | 10–12 | 6–16 | 9–13 | 4–17 | 10–12 |
| Cleveland | 13–9 | 12–9 | — | 11–11 | 14–8 | 7–14 | 10–12 | 14–8 |
| Detroit | 14–8 | 12–10 | 11–11 | — | 9–13 | 4–18 | 10–12 | 10–12–1 |
| New York | 17–5 | 16–6 | 8–14 | 13–9 | — | 8–14 | 14–8 | 12–10 |
| Philadelphia | 18–4 | 13–9 | 14–7 | 18–4 | 14–8 | — | 11–10–1 | 16–4 |
| St. Louis | 11–11–1 | 17–4 | 12–10 | 12–10 | 8–14 | 10–11–1 | — | 9–13 |
| Washington | 12–10 | 12–10 | 8–14 | 12–10–1 | 10–12 | 4–16 | 13–9 | — |

=== Roster ===
1929 Washington Senators
Roster
| Pitchers: Walter Beall; Garland Braxton; Lloyd Brown; Bobby Burke; Archie Campbell; Bump Hadley; Paul Hopkins; Sam Jones; Ad Liska; Firpo Marberry; Paul McCullough; Don Savidge; Myles Thomas; Ed Wineapple | Catchers: Muddy Ruel; Roy Spencer; Bennie Tate; Infielders: Ossie Bluege; Harley Boss; Joe Cronin; Charlie Gooch; Jackie Hayes; Joe Judge; Buddy Myer; Stuffy Stewart | Outfielders: Nick Altrock; Red Barnes; Ira Flagstead; Goose Goslin; Spencer Harris; Doc Land; Sam Rice; Sam West; Other batters: Patsy Gharrity | Manager: Walter Johnson |

== Player stats ==
=== Batting ===
==== Starters by position ====
Note: Pos = Position; G = Games played; AB = At bats; H = Hits; Avg. = Batting average; HR = Home runs; RBI = Runs batted in

| Pos | Player | G | AB | H | Avg. | HR | RBI |
|---|---|---|---|---|---|---|---|
| C | Bennie Tate | 81 | 265 | 78 | .294 | 0 | 30 |
| 1B | Joe Judge | 143 | 543 | 171 | .315 | 6 | 71 |
| 2B | Buddy Myer | 141 | 563 | 169 | .300 | 3 | 82 |
| SS | Joe Cronin | 145 | 494 | 139 | .281 | 8 | 61 |
| 3B | Jackie Hayes | 123 | 424 | 117 | .276 | 2 | 57 |
| OF | Goose Goslin | 145 | 553 | 159 | .288 | 18 | 91 |
| OF | Sam West | 142 | 510 | 136 | .267 | 3 | 75 |
| OF | Sam Rice | 150 | 616 | 199 | .323 | 1 | 62 |

==== Other batters ====
Note: G = Games played; AB = At bats; H = Hits; Avg. = Batting average; HR = Home runs; RBI = Runs batted in

| Player | G | AB | H | Avg. | HR | RBI |
|---|---|---|---|---|---|---|
| Ossie Bluege | 64 | 220 | 65 | .295 | 5 | 31 |
| Muddy Ruel | 69 | 188 | 46 | .245 | 0 | 20 |
| Red Barnes | 72 | 130 | 26 | .200 | 1 | 15 |
| Roy Spencer | 50 | 116 | 18 | .155 | 1 | 9 |
| Harley Boss | 28 | 66 | 18 | .273 | 0 | 6 |
| Charlie Gooch | 39 | 57 | 16 | .281 | 0 | 5 |
| Ira Flagstead | 18 | 39 | 7 | .179 | 0 | 9 |
| Spence Harris | 6 | 14 | 3 | .214 | 0 | 1 |
| Stuffy Stewart | 22 | 6 | 0 | .000 | 0 | 0 |
| Doc Land | 1 | 3 | 0 | .000 | 0 | 0 |
| Patsy Gharrity | 3 | 2 | 0 | .000 | 0 | 0 |
| Nick Altrock | 1 | 1 | 1 | 1.000 | 0 | 0 |

=== Pitching ===
==== Starting pitchers ====
Note: G = Games pitched; IP = Innings pitched; W = Wins; L = Losses; ERA = Earned run average; SO = Strikeouts

| Player | G | IP | W | L | ERA | SO |
|---|---|---|---|---|---|---|
| Firpo Marberry | 49 | 250.1 | 19 | 12 | 3.06 | 121 |
| Bump Hadley | 37 | 195.1 | 6 | 16 | 5.62 | 98 |
| Sad Sam Jones | 24 | 153.2 | 9 | 9 | 3.92 | 36 |
| Myles Thomas | 22 | 125.1 | 7 | 8 | 3.52 | 33 |

==== Other pitchers ====
Note: G = Games pitched; IP = Innings pitched; W = Wins; L = Losses; ERA = Earned run average; SO = Strikeouts

| Player | G | IP | W | L | ERA | SO |
|---|---|---|---|---|---|---|
| Garland Braxton | 37 | 182.0 | 12 | 10 | 4.85 | 59 |
| Lloyd Brown | 40 | 168.0 | 8 | 7 | 4.18 | 48 |
| Bobby Burke | 37 | 141.0 | 6 | 8 | 4.79 | 51 |
| Ad Liska | 24 | 94.1 | 3 | 9 | 4.77 | 33 |

==== Relief pitchers ====
Note: G = Games pitched; W = Wins; L = Losses; SV = Saves; ERA = Earned run average; SO = Strikeouts

| Player | G | W | L | SV | ERA | SO |
|---|---|---|---|---|---|---|
| Paul Hopkins | 7 | 0 | 1 | 0 | 2.20 | 5 |
| Archie Campbell | 4 | 0 | 1 | 0 | 15.75 | 1 |
| Paul McCullough | 3 | 0 | 0 | 0 | 8.59 | 3 |
| Walter Beall | 3 | 1 | 0 | 0 | 3.86 | 3 |
| Don Savidge | 3 | 0 | 0 | 0 | 9.00 | 2 |
| Ed Wineapple | 1 | 0 | 0 | 0 | 4.50 | 1 |
