= List of Major League Baseball players (S) =

The following is a list of Major League Baseball players, retired or active. As of the end of the 2011 season, there have been 1,736 players with a last name that begins with S who have been on a major league roster at some point.

For reasons of space, this list has been split into three pages:

- Kirk Saarloos through Jake Seymour
- Adam Shabala through Jeremy Sowers
- Bob Spade through Jason Szuminski
