= Ed Wineapple =

American baseball player (1905–1996)

- Pitcher
- Born: August 10, 1905; Boston, Massachusetts, U.S.
- Died: July 23, 1996 (aged 90); Delray Beach, Florida, U.S.
- Batted: Left Threw: Left

MLB debut
- September 15, 1929, for the Washington Senators

Last MLB appearance
- September 15, 1929, for the Washington Senators

MLB statistics
- Earned run average: 4.50
- Innings pitched: 4
- Strikeouts: 1
- Stats at Baseball Reference

Teams
- Washington Senators (1929)

Edward Wineapple (August 10, 1905 – July 23, 1996) was an American professional baseball pitcher and basketball player. He played in one game in Major League Baseball for the Washington Senators during the 1929 season. He also played professional basketball for the Syracuse All-Americans in the original American Basketball League during the first half of the 1929–30 season before they folded operations entirely.

== Biography ==
Wineapple was born in Boston, Massachusetts, and was Jewish. He attended Syracuse University for his college freshman year, then transferred to Providence College, where he was a star basketball player for three years. A first-team All-American his senior year, he led the 1928–29 team to a 17–3 record and was the second-leading scorer in the nation.

His lone major league appearance came on September 15, 1929, in the Senators' 16–2 loss to the Detroit Tigers at Griffith Stadium. He took the mound in the sixth inning with the Tigers already holding a 12–2 lead, entering the game as part of a double switch in which he took the place of Baseball Hall of Fame shortstop Joe Cronin in the Washington lineup. Wineapple hurled the final four innings in relief, giving up four runs (two earned) on seven hits, walking three and striking out one against a Tigers lineup that featured Hall of Famer Charlie Gehringer.

From 1928 to 1931, he played summer baseball in the Cape Cod Baseball League (CCBL), where it was reported that Wineapple "seems to play baseball as he does basketball...with his heart in it all the time. He is pitching and hitting exceptionally well." Wineapple played for the CCBL's Osterville town team from 1928 to 1930, and for the Orleans team in 1931.

Wineapple was inducted into the Providence College sports hall of fame as part if its inaugural class of 1970. He died in Delray Beach, Florida in 1996 at age 90.
