= 1993 Junior League World Series =

Tournament information
- Location: Taylor, Michigan
- Dates: August 16–21

Final positions
- Champions: Cayey, Puerto Rico
- Runner-up: Reynosa, Mexico

The 1993 Junior League World Series took place from August 16–21 in Taylor, Michigan, United States. Cayey, Puerto Rico defeated Reynosa, Mexico in the championship game.

== Teams ==
United States	International
(Illinois) Chicago, Illinois Central	(Quebec) Salaberry-de-Valleyfield, Quebec Canada
(Maryland) Maryland East	(Germany) Germany Europe
(South Carolina) Taylors, South Carolina; Northwood; South	(Tamaulipas) Reynosa, Tamaulipas Mexico
(California) Sunnyvale, California West	Cayey, Puerto Rico Puerto Rico

== Results ==
Upper round 1	Upper round 2	Upper final	World Championship
—	Puerto Rico	11
—	Maryland	1
1–0	Puerto Rico	8
1–0	South Carolina	7
—	Canada	3
—	South Carolina	8
2–0	Puerto Rico	11
2–0	Mexico	1
—	Germany	1
—	Mexico	12
1–0	Mexico	11
1–0	California	1
—	Illinois	6
—	California	13	3–0	Puerto Rico	9	—
3–1	Mexico	1	—
Lower round 1	Lower round 2	Lower round 3	Lower final
1–1	California	14
0–1	Maryland	1–1	Maryland	6	2–1	Mexico	9
0–1	Canada	2–1	California	5	3–1	Illinois	3
2–1	Illinois	8
1–1	South Carolina	5
0–1	Germany	1–1	Illinois	7
0–1	Illinois

1993 Junior League World Series Champions
Cayey, Puerto Rico
