= Ralph Savidge =

American baseball player (1879–1959)

- Pitcher
- Born: February 3, 1879; Jerseytown, Pennsylvania, U.S.
- Died: July 22, 1959 (aged 80); Berwick, Pennsylvania, U.S.
- Batted: Right Threw: Right

MLB debut
- September 22, 1908, for the Cincinnati Reds

Last MLB appearance
- May 19, 1909, for the Cincinnati Reds

MLB statistics
- Win–loss record: 0–1
- Earned run average: 5.76
- Strikeouts: 9
- Stats at Baseball Reference

Teams
- Cincinnati Reds (1908–1909)

Ralph Austin Savidge (February 3, 1879 – July 22, 1959), nicknamed "Human Ripcord" and "the finger nail artist", was an American pitcher in Major League Baseball. He played for the Cincinnati Reds in 1908 and 1909 and also had an eight-year minor league career. He stood at 6' 2" and weighed 210 lbs.

== Career ==
Savidge was born in Jerseytown, Pennsylvania. He started his professional baseball career in 1904 and played four seasons in the South Atlantic League. He went 17-13 during his first year, with 185 strikeouts in 33 games. He then slumped to win–loss records of 10-13 and 14-17 with the Charleston Sea Gulls, but rebounded in 1907, going 19-12 for the Jacksonville Jays. Savidge's 216 strikeouts that year ranked second in the league to Bugs Raymond's total.

Savidge went to the Southern Association's Memphis Egyptians in 1908. On April 28, the Pittsburgh Press reported that he had developed a new pitch called the "finger nail curve" and would be using it during the season:

Savidge has introduced the finger-nail ball, so called because it is pitched with the nails of the thumb and the first three fingers penetrating the leather sphere. The finger-nail ball is thrown with all the force possible, but the Southern pitcher has mastered it so that it floats slowly toward the plate and breaks fast as it passes the batter.

Savidge started off hot, and on July 16, he was purchased by the National League's Cincinnati Reds for $3,500. He stayed in Memphis for the next two months, however, and ran his record to 20-11. The 20 wins led the entire league. Savidge also had a record of 67 consecutive scoreless innings pitched that season.

Savidge was called up to the Reds in September. In four major league games (including one start), he went 0-1 with a 2.57 earned run average. He started off 1909 with Cincinnati, as well, but allowed 10 earned runs in 4 innings. He made his last MLB appearance on May 19. That month, it was reported that Memphis was "making strenuous efforts" to try to re-acquire Savidge, but he was eventually purchased by the Eastern League's Montreal Royals. Savidge pitched well in May. However, his overall record that year was just 11-15. He was a holdout in early 1910 and eventually pitched for the Rochester Bronchos, going 13-12.

Savidge was purchased by Montgomery of the Southern Association for 1911. On February 25, Sporting Life reported that his addition made the Montgomery pitching staff "look unusually strong" and that he was expected to give his team a "brilliant chance of winning the pennant." He ended up going 7-8.

In 1912, Savidge had a hard time getting into shape, was released in July, and subsequently retired from professional baseball. Over his eight-year minor league career, he compiled a win–loss record of 111-101 to go along with his major league record of 0-1. His son, Don Savidge, made it to the majors in 1929 with the Washington Senators.

Ralph Savidge died in 1959 in Berwick, Pennsylvania. He was buried in Pine Grove Cemetery.
