= Jonatan Isenia =

American baseball player (born 1993)

- Pitcher
- Born: March 31, 1993 (age 33); Willemstad, Curaçao
- Bats: Right Throws: Right
- Stats at Baseball Reference

Jonatan Jezus Isenia (born March 31, 1993) is a Curaçaoan former professional baseball pitcher. Isenia played in Minor League Baseball in the Baltimore Orioles organization.

== Career ==
=== Baltimore Orioles ===
On November 23, 2011, Isenia signed with the Baltimore Orioles as an international free agent. He made his professional debut in 2012 with the Dominican Summer League Orioles, posting a 1.47 ERA with 10 strikeouts in 13 games.

Isenia made 13 appearances out of the bullpen for the rookie-level Gulf Coast League Orioles in 2013, registering a 1-2 record and 3.24 ERA with 24 strikeouts and one save over 25 innings of work. He returned to the GCL Orioles in 2014, posting a 2-3 record and 2.30 ERA with 46 strikeouts and one save across 43 innings pitched.

Isenia did not appear in a game during the 2015 season, and was placed on the restricted list on June 24, 2016; despite later being reassigned to the Double-A Bowie Baysox, Isenia never played in another game for the organization.

=== Vaessen Pioniers ===
On March 27, 2016, Isenia signed with the Vaessen Pioniers of the Honkbal Hoofdklasse. In 18 appearances for the Pioniers, Isenia posted a 2-0 record and 5.40 ERA with 17 strikeouts over 20 innings of work.

== International career ==
Isenia competed for the Netherlands national baseball team in the 2013 World Baseball Classic.
