= Paul McCullough (baseball) =

American baseball player (1898-1970)

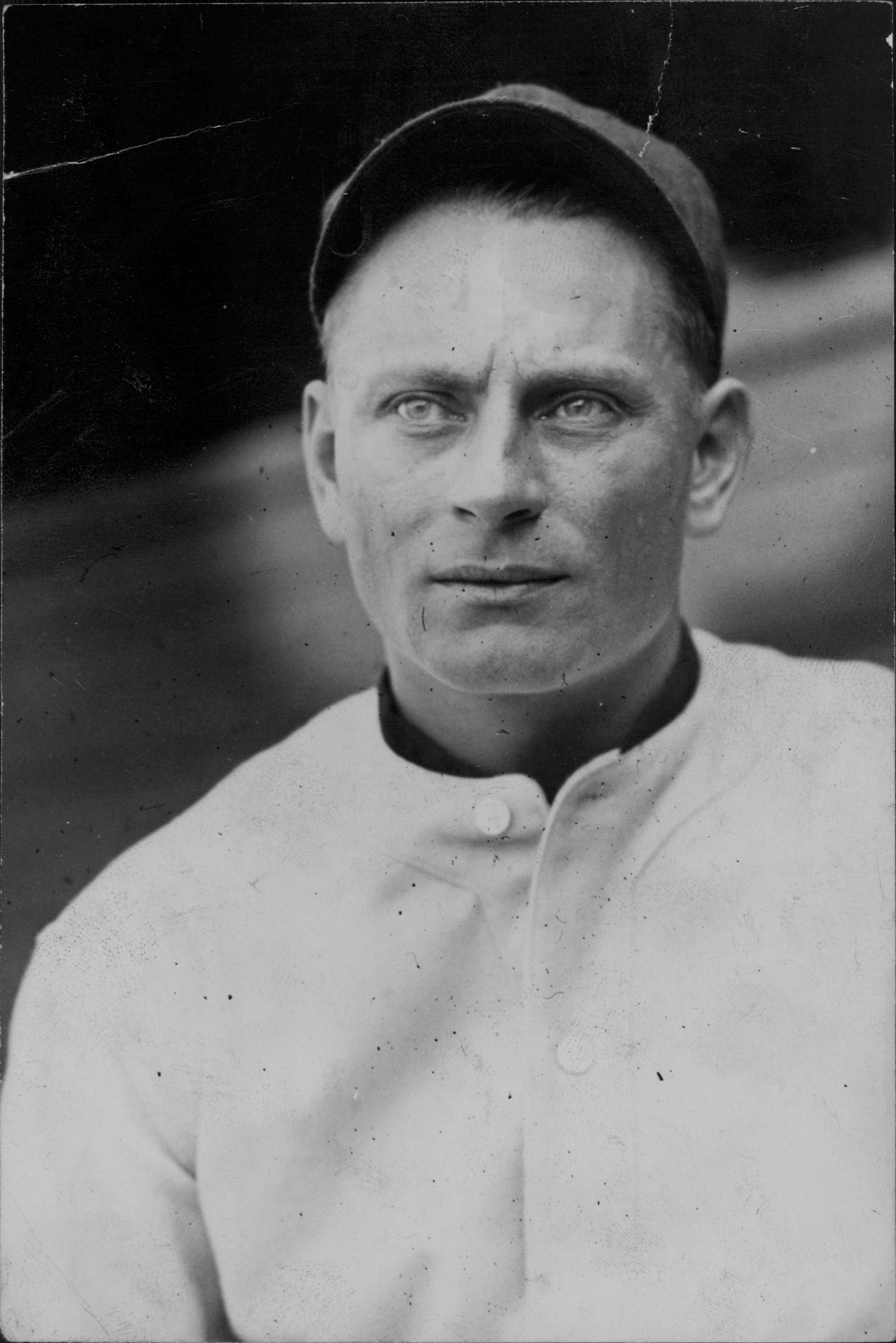
- Pitcher
- Born: July 28, 1898; New Castle, Pennsylvania, U.S.
- Died: November 7, 1970 (aged 72); New Castle, Pennsylvania, U.S.
- Batted: Right Threw: Right

MLB debut
- July 2, 1929, for the Washington Senators

Last MLB appearance
- July 8, 1929, for the Washington Senators

MLB statistics
- Games pitched: 3
- Innings pitched: 7.1
- Earned run average: 8.59
- Stats at Baseball Reference

Teams
- Washington Senators (1929)

Paul Willard McCullough (July 28, 1898 – November 7, 1970) was an American Major League Baseball pitcher. McCullough played in three games for the Washington Senators in 1929.
