= Charlie Gooch =

American baseball player (1902–1982)

- First baseman / Third baseman
- Born: June 5, 1902; Smyrna, Tennessee, U.S.
- Died: May 30, 1982 (aged 79); Lanham, Maryland, U.S.
- Batted: Right Threw: Right

MLB debut
- April 18, 1929, for the Washington Senators

Last MLB appearance
- October 6, 1929, for the Washington Senators

MLB statistics
- Batting average: .281
- Home runs: 0
- Runs batted in: 5
- Stats at Baseball Reference

Teams
- Washington Senators (1929)

Charles Furman Gooch (June 5, 1902 – May 30, 1982) was an American professional baseball player. He was a first baseman and third baseman for one season (1929) with the Washington Senators. For his career, he compiled a .281 batting average in 57 at-bats, with five runs batted in.

He was born in Smyrna, Tennessee, and died in Lanham, Maryland, at the age of 79.
