= Aaron Durley =

American baseball player

Aaron Durley (born July 21, 1993) is a former Little League World Series baseball player known for his exceptional size, a former all-state high school basketball player, and a former player for Texas Christian University's basketball team (TCU).

Durley was born in Houston, Texas. He first became the object of media attention in 2005 (though garnered much more in 2006 when he had grown 4 more inches to 6' 8"), when he played first base and pitched and batted fifth in the Little League World Series for the Arabian American team from Dhahran, Saudi Arabia, which is composed of the children of expatriate employees of Saudi Aramco (the Saudi national oil company), many from the United States. At 6' 9", 245, Durley is the biggest player in Little League World Series history. He was taller than the average NBA player.

He had previously played for the Arabian American team in the 2005 Little League World Series. By 2008, Durley was 6'10", weighed 265 pounds, and wore a size 17 shoe. In August 2009, Durley was 6'11" tall, weighed 250 lbs., and wore a size 18 shoe.

Durley received some of his shoes from big time basketball players such as NBA Houston Rockets star Yao Ming, and University of Texas center Dexter Pittman. For five years, Durley lived with his parents in Saudi Arabia, where his 6'8" father worked for Saudi Aramco and coached his Dhahran team. His mother, Dana, is just under 6 feet tall. Before that, he lived in Calgary, Alberta, Canada, where his father had moved from Texas.

Durley attended high school in Houston at St. Thomas High School, and lived with his grandparents. Described by the Houston Chronicle in November 2008 as a "freshman phenom", he got 16 points in his first game with the team. In 2010, he was named by the Texas Association of Private and Parochial Schools to its second-team Class 5A All-State Boys Basketball Team. Durley left St. Thomas High School for Houston-area Fort Bend Bush High School, graduating in 2011 as a three-star recruit according to Rivals.com and Scout.com.

Having previously committed to Marquette University on October 26, 2011, he later signed with Texas Christian University (TCU) and redshirted his freshman year after suffering a major knee injury in preseason workouts. After nine months of rehabilitation, Durley re-tore his ACL during a layup drill prior to an exhibition game in Canada at the start of the 2013–14 season. Durley and the TCU coaching staff agreed that it was best for Durley to take a break from basketball for the sake of his long-term health. Durley graduated from TCU with a major in Sports Broadcasting in May 2016.

His brother Cameron Durley participated in the 2008 Little League World Series, also as a member of the Dhahran, Saudi Arabia team. Cameron was 6'2" and 228 lbs. at 12 years of age at the time. His grandfather, Wilson Graham, played college basketball in Ohio, and his father played at East Texas State. His aunt is former WNBA player Margo Graham.

== Sources ==
- Armas, Genaro (August 21, 2006). "6-foot-8 Little Leaguer towers over foes". Associated Press. Archived from the original on August 22, 2006.
- Valade, Jodie (August 22, 2006). "Little League's big product". Cleveland Plain Dealer. Archived from the original on June 7, 2011.
