= Don Savidge =

American baseball player (1908-1983)

- Pitcher
- Born: August 28, 1908; Berwick, Pennsylvania
- Died: March 22, 1983 (aged 74); Santa Barbara, California
- Batted: Right Threw: Right

MLB debut
- August 6, 1929, for the Washington Senators

Last MLB appearance
- August 31, 1929, for the Washington Senators

MLB statistics
- Win–loss record: 0–0
- Earned run average: 9.00
- Strikeouts: 2
- Stats at Baseball Reference

Teams
- Washington Senators (1929)

Donald Snyder Savidge (August 28, 1908 – March 22, 1983) was a pitcher in Major League Baseball. He played for the Washington Senators in 1929. His father, Ralph Savidge, was also an MLB pitcher.
