= Jim Sadowski =

American baseball player (born 1951)

- Pitcher
- Born: August 7, 1951 (age 74); Pittsburgh, Pennsylvania, U.S.
- Batted: Right Threw: Right

MLB debut
- April 27, 1974, for the Pittsburgh Pirates

Last MLB appearance
- May 14, 1974, for the Pittsburgh Pirates

MLB statistics
- Win–loss record: 0–1
- Earned run average: 6.00
- Strikeouts: 1
- Stats at Baseball Reference

Teams
- Pittsburgh Pirates (1974)

James Michael Sadowski (born August 7, 1951) is an American former relief pitcher in Major League Baseball who played briefly for the Pittsburgh Pirates in their 1974 season. Listed at 6' 3", 195 lb, Sadowski batted and threw right-handed. Coming out of a baseball family, he is the nephew of former big leaguers Bob, Ed and Ted Sadowski.

== Biography ==
In one-season career, Sadowski posted a 0-1 record and a 6.00 ERA in four relief appearances.

Sadowski also pitched for the Pirates, Kansas City Royals and Cincinnati Reds Minor League systems in parts of 10 seasons spanning 1969–1979. He went 58-72 with a 3.92 ERA in 248 games (131 starts), walking 617 hitters while striking out 768 in 1,057 innings of work.

In addition, Sadowski played winter baseball with the Navegantes del Magallanes and Leones del Caracas clubs of the Venezuelan League during the 1974–1977 seasons.
