= Ted Sadowski =

American baseball player (1936–1993)

- Pitcher
- Born: April 1, 1936; Pittsburgh, Pennsylvania, U.S.
- Died: July 18, 1993 (aged 57); Shaler Township, Pennsylvania, U.S.
- Batted: Right Threw: Right

MLB debut
- September 2, 1960, for the Washington Senators

Last MLB appearance
- July 4, 1962, for the Minnesota Twins

MLB statistics
- Win–loss record: 2–3
- Earned run average: 5.76
- Strikeouts: 39
- Stats at Baseball Reference

Teams
- Washington Senators / Minnesota Twins (1960–1962)

Theodore Sadowski (April 1, 1936 – July 18, 1993) was an American professional baseball player and a middle-relief pitcher in the Major Leagues for the Washington Senators / Minnesota Twins (1960–62). Sadowski batted and threw right-handed, stood 6 feet 1 inch (1.85 m) tall and weighed 190 pounds (86 kg). He was the brother of Bob Sadowski and Ed Sadowski, and uncle of Jim Sadowski.

Coming from a Pittsburgh baseball family, Sadowski himself had a 12-year pro career. He broke into the big leagues with the 1960 Senators, who the following season became the Minnesota Twins. In his three-season MLB career, he posted a 2–3 record with a 5.76 ERA and one save in 43 games and 841/3 innings pitched.

Sadowski died of cancer in Shaler Township, Pennsylvania, at age 57.
