= Bob Sadowski (pitcher) =

American baseball player (1938–2018)

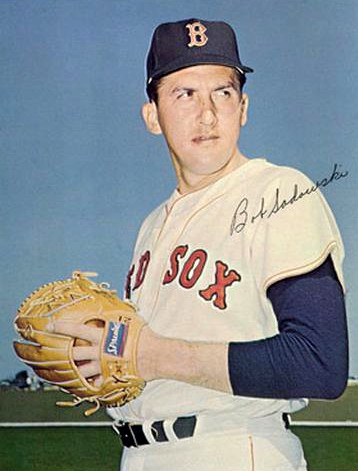
- Sadowski in 1966
- Pitcher
- Born: February 19, 1938; Pittsburgh, Pennsylvania, U.S.
- Died: August 5, 2018 (aged 80); Newnan, Georgia, U.S.
- Batted: Right Threw: Right

MLB debut
- June 19, 1963, for the Milwaukee Braves

Last MLB appearance
- July 4, 1966, for the Boston Red Sox

MLB statistics
- Win–loss record: 20–27
- Earned run average: 3.87
- Strikeouts: 257
- Stats at Baseball Reference

Teams
- Milwaukee Braves (1963–1965); Boston Red Sox (1966)

Robert Sadowski (February 19, 1938 – August 5, 2018) was an American pitcher in Major League Baseball who played from 1963 through 1966 for the Milwaukee Braves (1963–65) and Boston Red Sox (1966). Sadowski batted and threw right-handed. He debuted on June 19, 1963 and played his final game on July 4, 1966. He was the brother of Ed Sadowski and Ted Sadowski, and uncle of Jim Sadowski. He was not, however, related to third baseman Bob Sadowski, who played for four MLB teams between 1960 and 1963.

== Career ==
Sadowski divided his playing time between starting and relieving. He was signed by the St. Louis Cardinals as a free agent in 1958, then was sent to the Milwaukee Braves along with Gene Oliver in 1963 in the same trade that brought Lew Burdette to the Cardinals. His most productive season came in 1964, when he posted career-highs in wins (9), games pitched (51), starts (18), saves (5) and innings (166 2/3).

Sadowski has the distinction of being the last Braves starting pitcher in their final home opener in Milwaukee, as he defeated the Chicago Cubs 5–1 (April 15, 1965). Suffering from arm miseries, he pitched his final Major League season for the Boston Red Sox in 1966. Sadowski worked in only 331/3 innings and made five starts, but one of them, on June 1, saw him combine with José Santiago on a three-hit shutout to defeat the Washington Senators at Fenway Park. It was Sadowski's only win in a Red Sox uniform and his last in the big leagues.

In a four-season MLB career, Sadowski posted a 20–27 record with a 3.87 ERA, eight saves, and 257 strikeouts in 115 games (54 as a starter). In 4392/3 innings pitched, he allowed 416 hits and 130 bases on balls.
