= Ed Sadowski =

American baseball player (1931–1993)

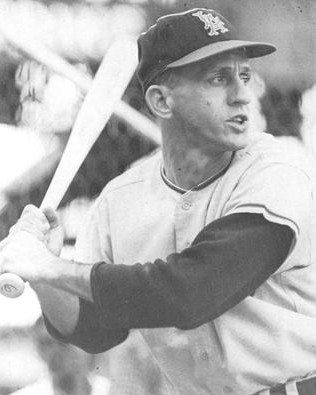
- Catcher
- Born: January 19, 1931; Pittsburgh, Pennsylvania, U.S.
- Died: November 6, 1993 (aged 62); Garden Grove, California, U.S.
- Batted: Right Threw: Right

MLB debut
- April 20, 1960, for the Boston Red Sox

Last MLB appearance
- October 2, 1966, for the Atlanta Braves

MLB statistics
- Batting average: .202
- Home runs: 12
- Runs batted in: 39

Teams
- Boston Red Sox (1960); Los Angeles Angels (1961–1963); Atlanta Braves (1966)

Edward Roman Sadowski (January 19, 1931 – November 6, 1993) was an American catcher in Major League Baseball who played in all or part of four seasons between 1960 and 1966 for the Boston Red Sox (1960), Los Angeles Angels (1961–1963) and Atlanta Braves (1966). Sadowski batted and threw right-handed. He debuted on April 20, 1960, and played his final game on October 2, 1966. He was the brother of Bob Sadowski and Ted Sadowski, and uncle of Jim Sadowski. All were pitchers who played in the Major Leagues.

== Career ==
Coming from a Pittsburgh, Pennsylvania baseball family, Sadowski was a valuable backup catcher for Russ Nixon in Boston, Earl Averill and Buck Rodgers with the Angels, and Joe Torre in Atlanta. In 1963 he appeared in a career-high 80 games and collected four home runs with 24 runs and 15 RBI, also career-numbers.

In a five-season career, Sadowski was a .202 hitter with 12 home runs and 39 RBI in 217 games.

He was the last Red Sox player to wear uniform #8 before it was issued in 1961 to eventual Baseball Hall of Fame outfielder Carl Yastrzemski, then a rookie. The number was retired in 1989.

== Later life ==
Following his playing career, Sadowski served as a minor league manager and pitching instructor for the Montreal Expos. He retired from baseball in 1970, becoming a physical education teacher in California.

He died in Garden Grove at age 62, after suffering amyotrophic lateral sclerosis (ALS), commonly called Lou Gehrig's disease. He died just a few months after his brother Ted, who died of cancer.
