= 1921 Pittsburgh Pirates season =

1921 Pittsburgh Pirates
- League: National League
- Ballpark: Forbes Field
- City: Pittsburgh, Pennsylvania
- Owners: Barney Dreyfuss
- Managers: George Gibson
- Radio: KDKA (ad hoc)

The Pittsburgh Pirates played their 40th season in 1921. It was their 35th season in the National League. The Pirates finished second in the league standings with a record of 90–63. It was the first season in which games were aired on radio via the then new station KDKA to listeners all over Pittsburgh, making that team the first in MLB to employ radio broadcasters for game broadcasts on the then new medium.

== Regular season ==
=== Season standings ===
National League
Team	W	L	Pct.	GB	Home	Road
New York Giants	94	59	.614	—	53‍–‍26	41‍–‍33
Pittsburgh Pirates	90	63	.588	4	45‍–‍31	45‍–‍32
St. Louis Cardinals	87	66	.569	7	48‍–‍29	39‍–‍37
Boston Braves	79	74	.516	15	42‍–‍32	37‍–‍42
Brooklyn Robins	77	75	.507	16½	41‍–‍37	36‍–‍38
Cincinnati Reds	70	83	.458	24	40‍–‍36	30‍–‍47
Chicago Cubs	64	89	.418	30	32‍–‍44	32‍–‍45
Philadelphia Phillies	51	103	.331	43½	29‍–‍47	22‍–‍56

=== Record vs. opponents ===
1921 National League record Sources:
Team	BSN	BRO	CHC	CIN	NYG	PHI	PIT	STL
Boston	—	11–11	14–8	13–9	8–13	14–8	9–13	10–12
Brooklyn	11–11	—	10–11	10–11	12–10	16–6	10–12	8–14
Chicago	8–14	11–10	—	13–9	8–14	11–11	5–17	8–14
Cincinnati	9–13	11–10	9–13	—	8–14	13–9	8–14	12–10
New York	13–8	10–12	14–8	14–8	—	16–6	16–6	11–11
Philadelphia	8–14	6–16	11–11	9–13	6–16	—	4–18	7–15
Pittsburgh	13–9	12–10	17–5	14–8	6–16	18–4	—	10–11–1
St. Louis	12–10	14–8	14–8	10–12	11–11	15–7	11–10–1	—

=== Game log ===
1921 Game Log: 90–63 (Home: 45–31; Away: 45–32)
April: 11–3 (Home: 3–1; Away: 8–2)

#	Date	Opponent	Score	Win	Loss	Save	Attendance	Record
1	April 13	@ Reds	3–5	Luque	**Adams** (0–1)	—	30,444	0–1
2	April 14	@ Reds	7–2	**Cooper** (1–0)	Marquard	—	—	1–1
3	April 15	@ Reds	3–1	**Hamilton** (1–0)	Rixey	**Yellow Horse** (1)	—	2–1
4	April 16	@ Reds	7–3	**Ponder** (1–0)	Brenton	—	—	3–1
5	April 18	@ Cubs	4–7	Tyler	**Zinn** (0–1)	—	—	3–2
6	April 19	@ Cubs	14–2	**Hamilton** (2–0)	Martin	—	—	4–2
7	April 20	@ Cubs	6–5	**Carlson** (1–0)	Freeman	**Glazner** (1)	—	5–2
8	April 21	Reds	8–7	**Yellow Horse** (1–0)	Brenton	—	—	6–2
9	April 22	Reds	6–1	**Zinn** (1–1)	Luque	—	—	7–2
10	April 23	Reds	4–5	Marquard	**Hamilton** (2–1)	—	—	7–3
11	April 24	@ Reds	7–2	**Adams** (1–1)	Rixey	—	—	8–3
12	April 25	@ Cardinals	6–5 (10)	**Ponder** (2–0)	Pertica	—	—	9–3
13	April 27	@ Cardinals	7–4	**Hamilton** (3–1)	May	**Zinn** (1)	—	10–3
14	April 29	Cubs	3–0	**Cooper** (2–0)	York	—	—	11–3

May: 18–7 (Home: 7–2; Away: 11–5)

#	Date	Opponent	Score	Win	Loss	Save	Attendance	Record
15	May 1	@ Cubs	2–0	**Adams** (2–1)	Vaughn	—	—	12–3
16	May 2	@ Cubs	4–3	**Glazner** (1–0)	Martin	—	—	13–3
17	May 5	Cardinals	8–3	**Cooper** (3–0)	Pertica	—	—	14–3
18	May 6	Cardinals	10–6	**Hamilton** (4–1)	Haines	**Zinn** (2)	—	15–3
19	May 7	Cardinals	2–1	**Glazner** (2–0)	Sherdel	—	—	16–3
20	May 8	@ Reds	0–1	Rixey	**Adams** (2–2)	—	—	16–4
21	May 10	@ Braves	5–2	**Cooper** (4–0)	Oeschger	—	—	17–4
22	May 11	@ Braves	0–1 (13)	Fillingim	**Hamilton** (4–2)	—	—	17–5
23	May 12	@ Braves	3–1	**Glazner** (3–0)	Watson	—	—	18–5
24	May 14	@ Phillies	6–4 (10)	**Cooper** (5–0)	Smith	—	—	19–5
25	May 16	@ Phillies	0–3	Causey	**Hamilton** (4–3)	Ring	—	19–6
26	May 17	@ Phillies	6–4	**Glazner** (4–0)	Hubbell	—	—	20–6
27	May 18	@ Robins	11–2	**Cooper** (6–0)	Ruether	—	10,000	21–6
28	May 19	@ Robins	7–5	**Adams** (3–2)	Smith	—	10,000	22–6
29	May 20	@ Robins	3–2	**Hamilton** (5–3)	Cadore	—	8,000	23–6
30	May 21	@ Robins	13–6	**Zinn** (2–1)	Mitchell	**Carlson** (1)	20,000	24–6
31	May 22	@ Giants	8–6	**Cooper** (7–0)	Sallee	—	40,000	25–6
32	May 24	@ Giants	3–5	Nehf	**Adams** (3–3)	—	—	25–7
33	May 26	Reds	1–4	Marquard	**Hamilton** (5–4)	—	—	25–8
34	May 27	Reds	5–4	**Cooper** (8–0)	Rixey	—	—	26–8
35	May 28	Reds	4–3	**Adams** (4–3)	Luque	—	—	27–8
36	May 29	@ Reds	3–4 (13)	Rixey	**Carlson** (1–1)	—	—	27–9
37	May 30	Cubs	13–0	**Zinn** (3–1)	York	—	—	28–9
38	May 30	Cubs	6–3	**Yellow Horse** (2–0)	Tyler	—	—	29–9
39	May 31	Cubs	6–7 (12)	Freeman	**Hamilton** (5–5)	—	—	29–10

June: 17–12 (Home: 11–7; Away: 6–5)

#	Date	Opponent	Score	Win	Loss	Save	Attendance	Record
40	June 1	Cubs	4–2	**Glazner** (5–0)	Martin	—	—	30–10
41	June 2	Giants	0–7	Nehf	**Zinn** (3–2)	—	20,000	30–11
42	June 3	Giants	1–4	Toney	**Hamilton** (5–6)	—	15,000	30–12
43	June 4	Giants	0–12	Douglas	**Cooper** (8–1)	—	25,000	30–13
44	June 6	Giants	5–4	**Adams** (5–3)	Barnes	—	9,000	31–13
45	June 7	Braves	7–10	Oeschger	**Yellow Horse** (2–1)	—	—	31–14
46	June 8	Braves	16–4	**Hamilton** (6–6)	McQuillan	—	—	32–14
47	June 9	Braves	5–3	**Cooper** (9–1)	Fillingim	—	—	33–14
48	June 10	Braves	1–4	Scott	**Glazner** (5–1)	—	—	33–15
49	June 11	Phillies	10–3	**Adams** (6–3)	Hubbell	—	—	34–15
50	June 13	Phillies	12–5	**Hamilton** (7–6)	Baumgartner	—	—	35–15
51	June 14	Phillies	8–3	**Zinn** (4–2)	Ring	—	—	36–15
52	June 15	Robins	3–7	Grimes	**Cooper** (9–2)	—	7,000	36–16
53	June 16	Robins	6–5 (17)	**Yellow Horse** (3–1)	Mamaux	—	5,000	37–16
54	June 17	Robins	3–8	Cadore	**Hamilton** (7–7)	—	8,000	37–17
55	June 18	Robins	4–3	**Cooper** (10–2)	Ruether	—	18,000	38–17
56	June 20	Phillies	3–2	**Yellow Horse** (4–1)	Meadows	**Zinn** (3)	—	39–17
57	June 22	@ Reds	5–2 (12)	**Cooper** (11–2)	Rixey	—	—	40–17
58	June 23	@ Cardinals	2–3 (12)	Walker	**Carlson** (1–2)	—	—	40–18
59	June 23	@ Cardinals	3–4	Doak	**Zinn** (4–3)	—	—	40–19
60	June 24	@ Cardinals	4–3 (10)	**Glazner** (6–1)	Bailey	—	—	41–19
61	June 25	@ Cardinals	4–7	Pfeffer	**Yellow Horse** (4–2)	North	—	41–20
62	June 25	@ Cardinals	5–2	**Cooper** (12–2)	Pertica	—	—	42–20
63	June 26	@ Cubs	11–3	**Adams** (7–3)	Alexander	—	—	43–20
64	June 27	@ Cubs	10–3	**Morrison** (1–0)	Vaughn	—	—	44–20
65	June 28	@ Cubs	1–2	Martin	**Zinn** (4–4)	—	—	44–21
66	June 28	@ Cubs	6–8	Tyler	**Carlson** (1–3)	—	—	44–22
67	June 29	@ Cubs	3–1	**Cooper** (13–2)	Cheeves	—	—	45–22
68	June 30	Reds	5–3	**Yellow Horse** (5–2)	Luque	—	—	46–22

July: 14–13 (Home: 5–6; Away: 9–7)

#	Date	Opponent	Score	Win	Loss	Save	Attendance	Record
69	July 1	Reds	5–2	**Morrison** (2–0)	Rixey	—	—	47–22
70	July 2	Reds	9–0	**Adams** (8–3)	Brenton	—	—	48–22
71	July 3	@ Reds	2–8	Marquard	**Hamilton** (7–8)	—	—	48–23
72	July 4	Cardinals	5–2	**Glazner** (7–1)	Bailey	—	—	49–23
73	July 4	Cardinals	3–6	Pertica	**Cooper** (13–3)	—	—	49–24
74	July 5	Cardinals	2–8	Walker	**Yellow Horse** (5–3)	—	—	49–25
75	July 6	Cardinals	3–2 (13)	**Morrison** (3–0)	North	—	—	50–25
76	July 8	@ Robins	5–3	**Cooper** (14–3)	Schupp	—	—	51–25
77	July 9	@ Robins	4–2	**Glazner** (8–1)	Cadore	—	8,000	52–25
78	July 10	@ Robins	3–7	Grimes	**Morrison** (3–1)	—	10,000	52–26
79	July 11	@ Robins	8–9	Miljus	**Hamilton** (7–9)	—	8,000	52–27
80	July 12	@ Phillies	9–4	**Cooper** (15–3)	Baumgartner	—	—	53–27
81	July 14	@ Phillies	5–4 (10)	**Carlson** (2–3)	Ring	—	—	54–27
82	July 16	@ Giants	4–13	Douglas	**Cooper** (15–4)	—	33,000	54–28
83	July 17	@ Giants	4–2 (10)	**Hamilton** (8–9)	Causey	—	36,000	55–28
84	July 18	@ Giants	1–12	Nehf	**Morrison** (3–2)	—	10,000	55–29
85	July 19	@ Giants	10–1	**Adams** (9–3)	Ryan	—	18,000	56–29
86	July 20	@ Braves	2–0	**Cooper** (16–4)	Oeschger	—	—	57–29
87	July 22	@ Braves	1–2 (10)	McQuillan	**Hamilton** (8–10)	—	—	57–30
88	July 22	@ Braves	4–3 (13)	**Glazner** (9–1)	Fillingim	—	—	58–30
89	July 23	@ Braves	3–2	**Cooper** (17–4)	Watson	—	—	59–30
90	July 23	@ Braves	1–3	Scott	**Carlson** (2–4)	—	—	59–31
91	July 25	Giants	6–3	**Adams** (10–3)	Douglas	—	20,000	60–31
92	July 26	Giants	8–9 (10)	Barnes	**Glazner** (9–2)	—	15,000	60–32
93	July 27	Giants	1–4	Nehf	**Cooper** (17–5)	—	—	60–33
94	July 28	Giants	4–6	Douglas	**Glazner** (9–3)	Ryan	15,000	60–34
95	July 30	Braves	0–1	Oeschger	**Cooper** (17–6)	—	—	60–35

August: 18–12 (Home: 9–3; Away: 9–9)

#	Date	Opponent	Score	Win	Loss	Save	Attendance	Record
96	August 1	Braves	7–3	**Adams** (11–3)	McQuillan	—	—	61–35
97	August 3	Phillies	9–5	**Cooper** (18–6)	Winters	—	—	62–35
98	August 4	Phillies	5–0	**Hamilton** (9–10)	Meadows	—	—	63–35
99	August 5	Phillies	8–5	**Zinn** (5–4)	Ring	—	—	64–35
100	August 6	Robins	2–3	Cadore	**Glazner** (9–4)	—	18,000	64–36
101	August 8	Robins	2–4	Grimes	**Cooper** (18–7)	—	8,000	64–37
102	August 9	Robins	4–2	**Adams** (12–3)	Mitchell	**Zinn** (4)	8,000	65–37
103	August 10	Robins	0–1	Cadore	**Morrison** (3–3)	—	6,000	65–38
104	August 11	Cubs	7–3	**Hamilton** (10–10)	Alexander	—	—	66–38
105	August 11	Cubs	5–4 (11)	**Zinn** (6–4)	Martin	—	—	67–38
106	August 12	Cubs	12–9	**Cooper** (19–7)	Cheeves	—	—	68–38
107	August 13	Cubs	4–3	**Glazner** (10–4)	Freeman	—	—	69–38
108	August 14	@ Cubs	1–0	**Morrison** (4–3)	Martin	—	—	70–38
109	August 16	@ Phillies	5–6	Betts	**Cooper** (19–8)	—	—	70–39
110	August 16	@ Phillies	8–6 (11)	**Zinn** (7–4)	Smith	—	—	71–39
111	August 18	@ Phillies	4–3	**Hamilton** (11–10)	Ring	**Carlson** (2)	—	72–39
112	August 18	@ Phillies	3–2	**Glazner** (11–4)	Winters	—	—	73–39
113	August 19	@ Phillies	14–3	**Morrison** (5–3)	Meadows	—	—	74–39
114	August 19	@ Phillies	1–4	Hubbell	**Zinn** (7–5)	—	—	74–40
115	August 20	@ Braves	6–4 (13)	**Cooper** (20–8)	Fillingim	—	—	75–40
116	August 22	@ Braves	10–8	**Hamilton** (12–10)	McQuillan	**Carlson** (3)	—	76–40
117	August 23	@ Braves	3–4	Watson	**Glazner** (11–5)	—	—	76–41
118	August 24	@ Giants	2–10	Nehf	**Adams** (12–4)	—	—	76–42
119	August 24	@ Giants	0–7	Douglas	**Cooper** (20–9)	—	—	76–43
120	August 25	@ Giants	2–5	Toney	**Morrison** (5–4)	—	12,000	76–44
121	August 26	@ Giants	1–2	Douglas	**Hamilton** (12–11)	—	15,000	76–45
122	August 27	@ Giants	1–3	Nehf	**Carlson** (2–5)	—	36,000	76–46
123	August 28	@ Robins	2–0	**Morrison** (6–4)	Grimes	—	20,000	77–46
124	August 29	@ Robins	0–1	Ruether	**Cooper** (20–10)	—	4,500	77–47
125	August 30	@ Robins	8–2	**Glazner** (12–5)	Cadore	—	—	78–47

September: 11–16 (Home: 10–12; Away: 1–4)

#	Date	Opponent	Score	Win	Loss	Save	Attendance	Record
126	September 1	Cardinals	4–10	Pertica	**Hamilton** (12–12)	—	—	78–48
127	September 1	Cardinals	0–8	Sherdel	**Morrison** (6–5)	—	—	78–49
128	September 2	Cardinals	0–1	Haines	**Carlson** (2–6)	—	—	78–50
129	September 4	@ Reds	2–1 (12)	**Glazner** (13–5)	Luque	—	—	79–50
130	September 5	Reds	1–2 (13)	Rixey	**Hamilton** (12–13)	—	—	79–51
131	September 5	Reds	2–1	**Cooper** (21–10)	Markle	—	—	80–51
132	September 9	Cubs	5–8	Freeman	**Cooper** (21–11)	Alexander	—	80–52
133	September 10	Cubs	8–0	**Morrison** (7–5)	Alexander	—	10,000	81–52
134	September 11	@ Reds	1–4	Marquard	**Hamilton** (12–14)	—	3,000	81–53
135	September 12	Braves	5–4 (15)	**Adams** (13–4)	Scott	—	8,000	82–53
136	September 12	Braves	3–4	Morgan	**Zinn** (7–6)	—	—	82–54
137	September 13	Braves	5–3	**Carlson** (3–6)	McQuillan	—	5,000	83–54
138	September 14	Braves	5–2	**Morrison** (8–5)	Fillingim	—	—	84–54
139	September 15	Braves	3–6	Scott	**Cooper** (21–12)	—	5,000	84–55
140	September 16	Giants	0–5	Toney	**Hamilton** (12–15)	—	25,000	84–56
141	September 17	Giants	1–6	Nehf	**Carlson** (3–7)	—	25,000	84–57
142	September 19	Giants	2–1	**Adams** (14–4)	Douglas	—	10,000	85–57
143	September 21	Robins	0–2 (7)	Mitchell	**Morrison** (8–6)	—	3,000	85–58
144	September 22	Robins	3–1	**Glazner** (14–5)	Grimes	**Carlson** (4)	8,000	86–58
145	September 22	Robins	0–2	Cadore	**Cooper** (21–13)	Smith	12,000	86–59
146	September 23	Phillies	2–0	**Hamilton** (13–15)	Meadows	—	2,500	87–59
147	September 24	Phillies	4–3	**Morrison** (9–6)	Ring	—	6,000	88–59
148	September 26	Phillies	1–2	Hubbell	**Adams** (14–5)	—	1,500	88–60
149	September 27	Phillies	9–6	**Carlson** (4–7)	Winters	—	300	89–60
150	September 29	@ Cardinals	4–5 (10)	North	**Cooper** (21–14)	—	5,000	89–61
151	September 29	@ Cardinals	1–3 (6)	Sherdel	**Morrison** (9–7)	—	—	89–62
152	September 30	@ Cardinals	4–12	Haines	**Carlson** (4–8)	—	—	89–63

October: 1–0 (Home: 0–0; Away: 1–0)

#	Date	Opponent	Score	Win	Loss	Save	Attendance	Record
153	October 1	@ Cardinals	4–4			—	—	89–63
154	October 2	@ Cardinals	4–3	**Cooper** (22–14)	North	—	—	90–63

Legend: = Win = Loss = Tie
Bold = Pirates team member

=== Roster ===
1921 Pittsburgh Pirates
**Roster**
**Pitchers**: Babe Adams; Lyle Bigbee; Hal Carlson; Wilbur Cooper; Whitey Glazner; Earl Hamilton; Bill Hughes; Johnny Morrison; Phil Morrison; Elmer Ponder; Drew Rader; Rip Wheeler; Chief Yellow Horse; Jimmy Zinn	**Catchers**: Tony Brottem; Johnny Gooch; Walter Schmidt; Bill Skiff; Bill Warwick; Mike Wilson; **Infielders**: Clyde Barnhart; George Cutshaw; Charlie Grimm; Rabbit Maranville; Cotton Tierney; Pie Traynor	**Outfielders**: Carson Bigbee; Max Carey; Kiki Cuyler; Johnny Mokan; Dave Robertson; Ray Rohwer; Possum Whitted	**Manager**: George Gibson

== Player stats ==
=== Batting ===
==== Starters by position ====
Note: Pos = Position; G = Games played; AB = At bats; H = Hits; Avg. = Batting average; HR = Home runs; RBI = Runs batted in

Pos	Player	G	AB	H	Avg.	HR	RBI
C	Walter Schmidt	114	393	111	.282	0	38
1B	Charlie Grimm	151	562	154	.274	7	71
2B	George Cutshaw	98	350	119	.340	0	53
SS	Rabbit Maranville	153	612	180	.294	1	70
3B	Clyde Barnhart	124	449	116	.258	3	62
OF	Carson Bigbee	147	632	204	.323	3	42
OF	Max Carey	140	521	161	.309	7	56
OF	Possum Whitted	108	403	114	.283	7	63

==== Other batters ====
Note: G = Games played; AB = At bats; H = Hits; Avg. = Batting average; HR = Home runs; RBI = Runs batted in

Player	G	AB	H	Avg.	HR	RBI
Cotton Tierney	117	442	132	.299	3	52
Dave Robertson	60	230	74	.322	6	48
Tony Brottem	30	91	22	.242	0	9
Johnny Mokan	19	52	14	.269	0	9
Bill Skiff	16	45	13	.289	0	11
Ray Rohwer	30	40	10	.250	0	6
Johnny Gooch	13	38	9	.237	0	3
Pie Traynor	7	19	5	.263	0	2
Mike Wilson	5	4	0	.000	0	0
Kiki Cuyler	1	3	0	.000	0	0
Bill Warwick	1	1	0	.000	0	0

=== Pitching ===
==== Starting pitchers ====
Note: G = Games pitched; IP = Innings pitched; W = Wins; L = Losses; ERA = Earned run average; SO = Strikeouts

Player	G	IP	W	L	ERA	SO
Wilbur Cooper	38	327.0	22	14	3.25	134
Whitey Glazner	36	234.0	14	5	2.77	88
Earl Hamilton	35	225.0	13	15	3.36	59
Babe Adams	25	160.0	14	5	2.64	55
Johnny Morrison	21	144.0	9	7	2.88	52

==== Other pitchers ====
Note: G = Games pitched; IP = Innings pitched; W = Wins; L = Losses; ERA = Earned run average; SO = Strikeouts

Player	G	IP	W	L	ERA	SO
Jimmy Zinn	32	127.1	7	6	3.68	49
Hal Carlson	31	109.2	4	8	4.27	37
Chief Yellow Horse	10	48.1	5	3	2.98	19

==== Relief pitchers ====
Note: G = Games pitched; W = Wins; L = Losses; SV = Saves; ERA = Earned run average; SO = Strikeouts

Player	G	W	L	SV	ERA	SO
Elmer Ponder	8	2	0	0	2.19	3
Lyle Bigbee	5	0	0	0	1.13	1
Rip Wheeler	1	0	0	0	9.00	0
Bill Hughes	1	0	0	0	4.50	2
Drew Rader	1	0	0	0	0.00	0
Phil Morrison	1	0	0	0	0.00	1

== Farm system ==
Level	Team	League	Manager
A	Wichita Falls Spudders	Texas League	Walter Salm
