= Major League Baseball on the radio =

Major League Baseball on the radio has been a tradition for over 100 years, and still exists today. Baseball was one of the first sports to be broadcast in the United States. Every team in Major League Baseball has a flagship station, and baseball is also broadcast on national radio.

== History ==
=== Early period ===
==== 1920s ====
The first baseball game ever broadcast on radio was a Pittsburgh Pirates versus Philadelphia Phillies game on August 5, 1921. The game was broadcast by KDKA of Pittsburgh, and the Pirates defeated the Phillies 8-5. It was broadcast by KDKA staff announcer Harold Arlin. That year, KDKA and WJZ of Newark broadcast the first World Series on the radio, between the New York Giants and the New York Yankees, with Grantland Rice and Tommy Cowan calling the games for KDKA and WJZ, respectively. However, the broadcasters were not actually present at the game, but simply gave reports from a telegraph wire. In 1922, WJZ broadcast the entire series, with Rice doing play-by-play. For the 1923 World Series, Rice was joined on Westinghouse for the first time by Graham McNamee.

During the 1923 World Series, Rice was the main broadcaster, but during the fourth inning of Game 3, he turned the microphone over to McNamee. This was the start of McNamee's career, and McNamee became the first color commentator. Although frequently criticized for his lack of expertise, McNamee helped popularize baseball.

By 1924-1925, baseball broadcasts were occurring sporadically in other cities. For example, in Chicago in early October 1924, station WGN (AM) broadcast a "city series" between the White Sox and the Cubs. WGN also broadcast the Chicago Cubs' home opener in April 1925. And in Boston, WBZ (AM) broadcast the opening day game for the Boston Braves, who played against the New York Giants. Newspapers said this was the first time either Boston team (the Braves or the Red Sox) had been on the air. Throughout the rest of the 1925 season, Boston station WNAC broadcast some of the Braves' home games. The Boston Red Sox, however, did not get on the air in Boston until 1926, also on WNAC, beginning with the opening day game against the Yankees.

Meanwhile, the establishment of the National Broadcasting Company (later known as NBC) and the Columbia Broadcasting System (later called CBS) meant that by October 1927, two coast-to-coast networks were able to broadcast the World Series for the first time. Graham McNamee was chosen to announce the games for NBC and Major J. Andrew White was the announcer for CBS. In that first year, the commissioner of baseball, Kenesaw Mountain Landis, gave permission for both networks to air the games.

==== 1930s ====
Many owners were still wary. By the 1930s, the two-team cities of Boston, Philadelphia, St. Louis, and Chicago had reached an agreement not to broadcast away games. In other words, if the Boston Braves were at home, listeners could hear that game on the radio, but could not listen to the Boston Red Sox away game. The owners' argument –"they won't come to the park if you give the game away"– was invalidated under this arrangement. The New York owners went one step further: in 1932 they agreed to ban all radio broadcasting –even of visitors' re-creations– from their parks. Larry MacPhail took over the Cincinnati Reds in 1933 and sold a controlling interest in the club to Powel Crosley, owner of two Cincinnati radio stations. It was a match made in economic heaven: MacPhail knew that broadcasting games would promote the team and Crosley could now boost his radio ratings. Their symbiosis is reminiscent of St. Louis beer-garden magnate Chris von der Ahe's takeover of the St. Louis team in order to sell more beer. When MacPhail moved to Brooklyn in 1938, he brought Reds announcer Red Barber with him and broke the New York radio ban. The next year was the first year that all the major league teams broadcast their games. Prophetically, it was also the year of the first televised baseball game.

In 1935, Baseball Commissioner Judge Kenesaw Mountain Landis orchestrated a radio deal that covered the World Series. All three networks were involved, and baseball made US$400,000. Landis, as ever, was imperious; he dismissed Ted Husing as games announcer despite the fact that, with five World Series, Husing was second only to the ubiquitous Graham McNamee in Series-announcing experience. The amount of money involved in baseball broadcasting was growing. Gillette, the razor blade manufacturer and one of the first companies to realize the power of sports as an advertising vehicle, tried to flex its muscles by offering Red Barber a substantial amount to walk out on his Dodger contract and join Gillette on a new Yankees/Giants network. Barber refused. In 1946 the company was rich enough to sign a 10-year, $14-million deal for exclusive radio sponsorship of the World Series and All-Star Games.

Though radio grew quickly as a medium for baseball, many teams were still apprehensive about it, fearing negative effects on attendance. Nevertheless, each team was allowed to reach its own policy by 1932, and the Chicago Cubs broadcast all of their games on WMAQ in 1935. The last holdouts were the New York teams—the Giants, Dodgers, and Yankees combined to block radio broadcasts of their games until 1938.

By the end of this period, radio had become increasingly commercialized. Wheaties started its long relationship with baseball in 1933, and in 1934, sponsorship rights to the World Series were first sold.

=== Golden age ===
During the Golden Age of Radio, television sports broadcasting was in its infancy, and radio was still the main form of broadcasting baseball. Many notable broadcasters, such as Mel Allen, Red Barber, Harry Caray, Russ Hodges, Ernie Harwell, Bob Uecker, and Vin Scully, started in this period.

However, broadcasting still did not look like the way it does today—recreations of games based on telegrams, the original means of broadcasting, were still widely used. The Liberty Broadcasting System operated solely through recreations of games, because live games were too expensive. Gordon McLendon broadcast games throughout the South from 1948 until 1952, when new blackout regulations forced him to stop. The Mutual Broadcasting System also broadcast a Game of the Day in the 1950s.

=== Modern period ===
However, as the Golden Era wound down, radio was gradually eclipsed by television. The World Series and All-Star Game continued to be broadcast nationally on the radio, with NBC Radio covering the Fall Classic from 1960–1975, and CBS Radio from 1976–1997; the latter network added League Championship Series (and, later, Division Series) coverage as baseball's postseason expanded. However, after Mutual's Game of the Day ended in 1960 there would not be regular-season baseball broadcast nationally on the radio until 1985, when CBS Radio started a Saturday Game of the Week.

Beginning in 1982 the two World Series teams' flagship radio stations were regularly permitted to produce their own Series broadcasts with local announcers and air them live. The affiliate stations in the teams' radio networks continued to be obligated to carry the national broadcasts, however.

In 1998, national radio broadcasts moved to ESPN Radio. ESPN Radio currently broadcasts Sunday Night Baseball games during the regular season, as well as Saturday and occasional weekday games, along with the All-Star Game and all postseason contests. Since 2021, TUDN Radio airs Spanish-language coverage of select regular season and postseason games, including the World Series.

Since 2005, Major League Baseball has a partnership with XM Satellite Radio, launching a 24/7 channel MLB Home Plate which carries every major league game. Games are also carried on MLB Gameday Audio.

While all teams maintain a network of stations carrying their games in English, many teams also maintain a Spanish-language network as well. In addition, when the Washington Nationals were based in Montreal as the Montreal Expos, their games were broadcast in both English and French. Selected games of the Los Angeles Dodgers are broadcast in Korean by KMPC.

== See also ==
- Broadcasting of sports events

== Notes ==
1. Detroit's WWJ also claimed to have broadcast the first baseball game, as well as the 1920 World Series.
