= 1921 Chicago Cubs season =

1921 Chicago Cubs
- League: National League
- Ballpark: Cubs Park
- City: Chicago
- Record: 64–89 (.418)
- League place: 7th
- Owners: Charles Weeghman, William Wrigley Jr.
- Managers: Johnny Evers, Bill Killefer

The 1921 Chicago Cubs season was the 50th season of the Chicago Cubs franchise, the 46th in the National League and the sixth at Wrigley Field (then known as "Cubs Park"). The Cubs finished seventh in the National League with a record of 64–89.

== Regular season ==
=== Season standings ===
National League
| Team | W | L | Pct. | GB | Home | Road |
|---|---|---|---|---|---|---|
| New York Giants | 94 | 59 | .614 | — | 53‍–‍26 | 41‍–‍33 |
| Pittsburgh Pirates | 90 | 63 | .588 | 4 | 45‍–‍31 | 45‍–‍32 |
| St. Louis Cardinals | 87 | 66 | .569 | 7 | 48‍–‍29 | 39‍–‍37 |
| Boston Braves | 79 | 74 | .516 | 15 | 42‍–‍32 | 37‍–‍42 |
| Brooklyn Robins | 77 | 75 | .507 | 16½ | 41‍–‍37 | 36‍–‍38 |
| Cincinnati Reds | 70 | 83 | .458 | 24 | 40‍–‍36 | 30‍–‍47 |
| Chicago Cubs | 64 | 89 | .418 | 30 | 32‍–‍44 | 32‍–‍45 |
| Philadelphia Phillies | 51 | 103 | .331 | 43½ | 29‍–‍47 | 22‍–‍56 |

=== Record vs. opponents ===
1921 National League record Sources:
| Team | BSN | BRO | CHC | CIN | NYG | PHI | PIT | STL |
|---|---|---|---|---|---|---|---|---|
| Boston | — | 11–11 | 14–8 | 13–9 | 8–13 | 14–8 | 9–13 | 10–12 |
| Brooklyn | 11–11 | — | 10–11 | 10–11 | 12–10 | 16–6 | 10–12 | 8–14 |
| Chicago | 8–14 | 11–10 | — | 13–9 | 8–14 | 11–11 | 5–17 | 8–14 |
| Cincinnati | 9–13 | 11–10 | 9–13 | — | 8–14 | 13–9 | 8–14 | 12–10 |
| New York | 13–8 | 10–12 | 14–8 | 14–8 | — | 16–6 | 16–6 | 11–11 |
| Philadelphia | 8–14 | 6–16 | 11–11 | 9–13 | 6–16 | — | 4–18 | 7–15 |
| Pittsburgh | 13–9 | 12–10 | 17–5 | 14–8 | 6–16 | 18–4 | — | 10–11–1 |
| St. Louis | 12–10 | 14–8 | 14–8 | 10–12 | 11–11 | 15–7 | 11–10–1 | — |

== Roster ==
1921 Chicago Cubs
Roster
| Pitchers: Pete Alexander; Sweetbreads Bailey; Virgil Cheeves; Buck Freeman; Oscar Fuhr; Ollie Hanson; Percy Jones; Tony Kaufmann; Vic Keen; Speed Martin; Elmer Ponder; George Stueland; Lefty Tyler; Hippo Vaughn; Lefty York | Catchers: Tom Daly; Bill Killefer; Bob O'Farrell; Kettle Wirts; Infielders: Charlie Deal; Carter Elliott; Ray Grimes; Charlie Hollocher; John Kelleher; Joe Klugmann; William Marriott; Zeb Terry; Hooks Warner | Outfielders: Turner Barber; Max Flack; George Maisel; Dave Robertson; John Sullivan; Red Thomas; Babe Twombly | Manager: Johnny Evers; Bill Killefer; Coaches: Oscar Dugey |

== Player stats ==
=== Batting ===
==== Starters by position ====
Note: Pos = Position; G = Games played; AB = At bats; H = Hits; Avg. = Batting average; HR = Home runs; RBI = Runs batted in

| Pos | Player | G | AB | H | Avg. | HR | RBI |
|---|---|---|---|---|---|---|---|
| C | Bob O'Farrell | 96 | 260 | 65 | .250 | 4 | 32 |
| 1B | Ray Grimes | 147 | 530 | 170 | .321 | 6 | 79 |
| 2B | Zeb Terry | 123 | 488 | 134 | .275 | 2 | 45 |
| SS | Charlie Hollocher | 140 | 558 | 161 | .289 | 3 | 37 |
| 3B | Charlie Deal | 115 | 422 | 122 | .289 | 3 | 66 |
| OF | Max Flack | 133 | 572 | 172 | .301 | 6 | 37 |
| OF | Turner Barber | 127 | 452 | 142 | .314 | 1 | 54 |
| OF | George Maisel | 111 | 393 | 122 | .310 | 0 | 43 |

==== Other batters ====
Note: G = Games played; AB = At bats; H = Hits; Avg. = Batting average; HR = Home runs; RBI = Runs batted in

| Player | G | AB | H | Avg. | HR | RBI |
|---|---|---|---|---|---|---|
| John Kelleher | 95 | 301 | 93 | .309 | 4 | 47 |
| John Sullivan | 76 | 240 | 79 | .329 | 4 | 41 |
| Babe Twombly | 37 | 175 | 66 | .377 | 1 | 18 |
| Tom Daly | 51 | 143 | 34 | .238 | 0 | 22 |
| Bill Killefer | 45 | 133 | 43 | .323 | 0 | 16 |
| William Marriott | 30 | 38 | 12 | .316 | 0 | 7 |
| Hooks Warner | 14 | 38 | 8 | .211 | 0 | 3 |
| Dave Robertson | 22 | 36 | 8 | .222 | 0 | 14 |
| Red Thomas | 8 | 30 | 8 | .267 | 1 | 5 |
| Carter Elliott | 12 | 28 | 7 | .250 | 0 | 0 |
| Joe Klugmann | 6 | 21 | 6 | .286 | 0 | 2 |
| Kettle Wirts | 7 | 11 | 2 | .182 | 0 | 1 |

=== Pitching ===
==== Starting pitchers ====
Note: G = Games pitched; IP = Innings pitched; W = Wins; L = Losses; ERA = Earned run average; SO = Strikeouts

| Player | G | IP | W | L | ERA | SO |
|---|---|---|---|---|---|---|
| Pete Alexander | 31 | 252.0 | 15 | 13 | 3.39 | 77 |
| Speed Martin | 37 | 217.1 | 11 | 15 | 4.35 | 86 |
| Hippo Vaughn | 17 | 109.1 | 3 | 11 | 6.01 | 30 |
| Elmer Ponder | 16 | 89.1 | 3 | 6 | 4.74 | 31 |
| Vic Keen | 5 | 25.0 | 0 | 3 | 4.68 | 9 |
| Ollie Hanson | 2 | 9.0 | 0 | 2 | 7.00 | 2 |

==== Other pitchers ====
Note: G = Games pitched; IP = Innings pitched; W = Wins; L = Losses; ERA = Earned run average; SO = Strikeouts

| Player | G | IP | W | L | ERA | SO |
|---|---|---|---|---|---|---|
| Buck Freeman | 38 | 177.1 | 9 | 10 | 4.11 | 42 |
| Virgil Cheeves | 37 | 163.0 | 11 | 12 | 4.64 | 39 |
| Lefty York | 40 | 139.0 | 5 | 9 | 4.73 | 57 |
| Lefty Tyler | 10 | 50.0 | 3 | 2 | 3.24 | 8 |
| Tony Kaufmann | 2 | 13.0 | 1 | 0 | 4.15 | 6 |
| George Stueland | 2 | 11.0 | 0 | 1 | 5.73 | 4 |

==== Relief pitchers ====
Note: G = Games pitched; W = Wins; L = Losses; SV = Saves; ERA = Earned run average; SO = Strikeouts

| Player | G | W | L | SV | ERA | SO |
|---|---|---|---|---|---|---|
| Percy Jones | 32 | 3 | 5 | 0 | 4.56 | 46 |
| Sweetbreads Bailey | 3 | 0 | 0 | 0 | 3.60 | 2 |
| Oscar Fuhr | 1 | 0 | 0 | 0 | 9.00 | 2 |

== Farm system ==
| Level | Team | League | Manager |
|---|---|---|---|
| AA | Los Angeles Angels | Pacific Coast League; LEAGUE CHAMPION | Red Killefer |
