= Subway Series =

Baseball games played between National and American League teams in New York City

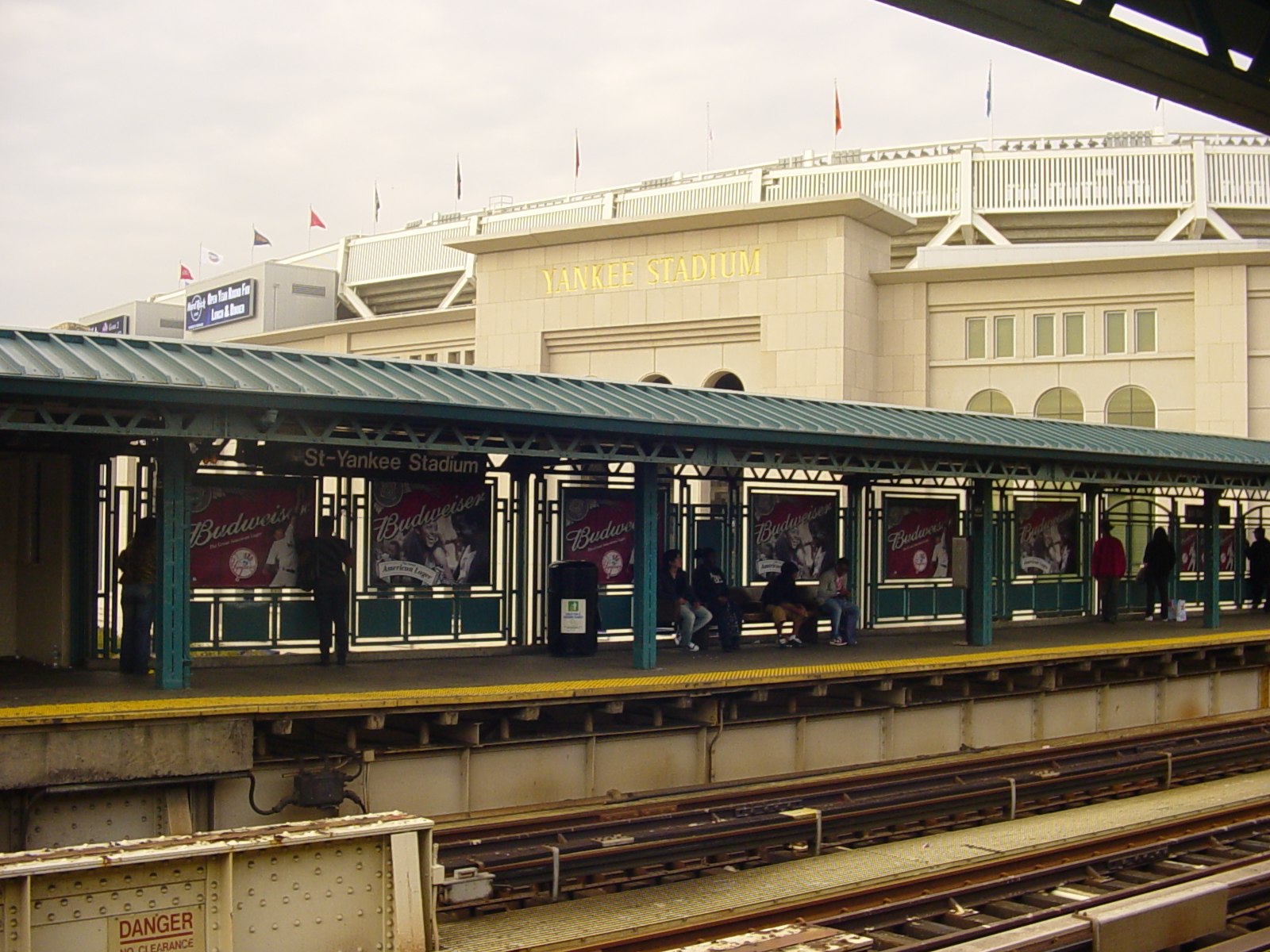
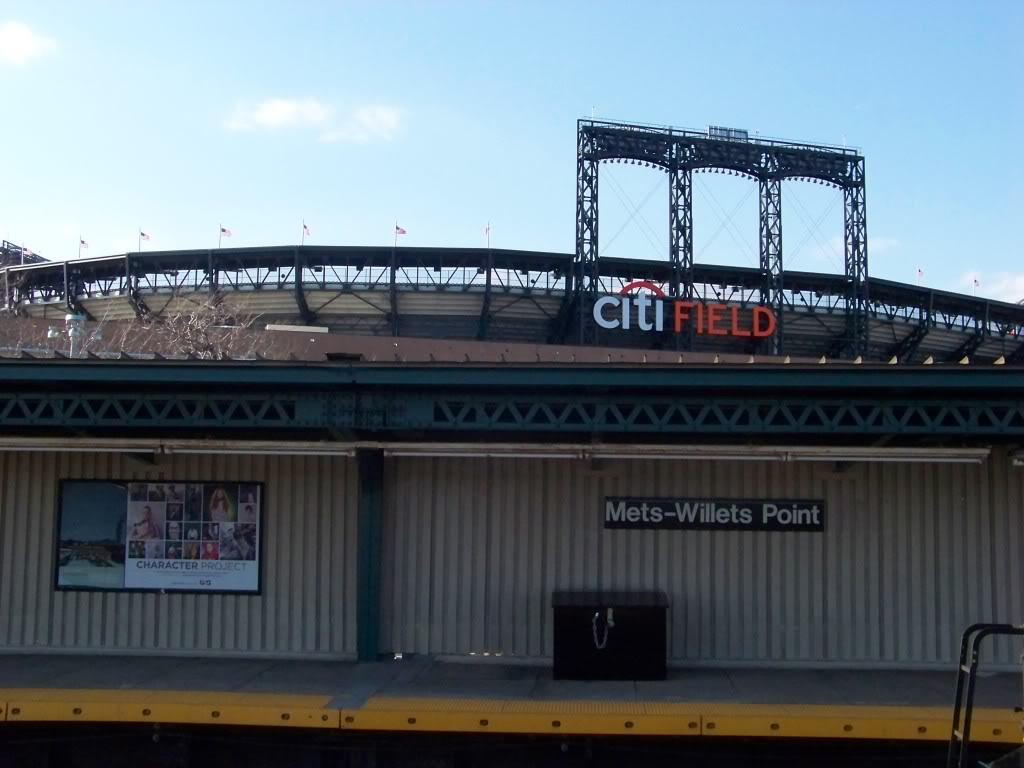
- The view of Yankee Stadium (top) and Citi Field (bottom) from their adjacent New York City Subway stations at 161st Street–Yankee Stadium station and Mets–Willets Point station, respectively

- New York Yankees (AL 1903–present) New York Mets (NL 1962–present) New York Giants (NL 1883–1957) Brooklyn Dodgers (NL 1890–1957) (AA 1884–1889)
- First meeting: October 5, 1921 (World Series); Polo Grounds, Manhattan; Yankees 3, Giants 0 October 1, 1941 (World Series); Yankee Stadium (I), Bronx; Yankees 3, Dodgers 2 June 16, 1997 (regular season); Yankee Stadium (I), Bronx; Mets 6, Yankees 0
- Latest meeting: September 13, 2026; Yankee Stadium, Bronx; Yankees 2, Mets 0
- Next meeting: May 27, 2027; Citi Field, Flushing, Queens

Statistics
- Total meetings: 242 (84 World Series, 158 regular season); 36 (all World Series, between the Giants and Yankees); 43 (all World Series, between the Dodgers and Yankees); 163 (5 World Series, 158 regular season between the Mets and Yankees)
- All-time series: Yankees (over Mets), 90–73 (.552)
- Regular season series: Yankees (over Mets), 86–72 (.544)
- Postseason results: Yankees (over Giants), 19–16 (.543); Yankees (over Dodgers), 23–14 (.622); Yankees (over Mets), 4–1 (.800)
- Largest victory: Giants: 13–5 (October 7, 1921–World Series); Dodgers: 13–8 (October 5, 1956–World Series); Mets: 12–2 (June 9, 2000; June 26, 2024; September 12, 2026–regular season); Yankees: 18–4 (over Giants, October 2, 1936–World Series) 9–0 (over Dodgers, October 10, 1956–World Series) 15–0 (over Mets, June 14, 2009–regular season)
- Longest win streak: Mets: 6 (May 27, 2013–May 13, 2014); Yankees: 7 (June 30, 2002–June 29, 2003)
- Current win streak: Yankees, 1 (over Mets)

Post-season history
- 1921 World Series: Giants defeat Yankees, 5–3; 1922 World Series: Giants defeat Yankees, 4–0; 1923 World Series: Yankees defeat Giants, 4–2; 1936 World Series: Yankees defeat Giants, 4–2; 1937 World Series: Yankees defeat Giants, 4–1; 1941 World Series: Yankees defeat Dodgers, 4–1; 1947 World Series: Yankees defeat Dodgers, 4–3; 1949 World Series: Yankees defeat Dodgers, 4–1; 1951 World Series: Yankees defeat Giants, 4–2; 1952 World Series: Yankees defeat Dodgers, 4–3; 1953 World Series: Yankees defeat Dodgers, 4–2; 1955 World Series: Dodgers defeat Yankees, 4–3; 1956 World Series: Yankees defeat Dodgers, 4–3; 2000 World Series: Yankees defeat Mets, 4–1

Locations of the New York Mets and New York Yankees and former locations of the Brooklyn Dodgers and New York Giants

A Subway Series in Major League Baseball (MLB) is one played between teams based in New York City, currently the New York Yankees and New York Mets, and historically the Yankees versus the New York Giants or Brooklyn Dodgers. The venues for games have been accessible via the New York City Subway, hence the name of the series.

The term historically refers to World Series games played between the city's teams. The Yankees have appeared in all Subway Series games as they have been the only American League (AL) team based in the city. The National League (NL) representative in those series has seven times been the Dodgers, six times the Giants, and the Mets once, in 2000. Since 1997, the term has also been applied to interleague play during the regular season between the Yankees and Mets.

== 19th century Subway Series ==
Although organized games between all-stars from New York teams against all-stars from Brooklyn teams date back to the 1850s, the first actual New York–Brooklyn "World Championship Series" occurred in 1889, a full nine years before Brooklyn was incorporated into the City of New York by the Greater New York Act of 1898. At the time, the series would not have been called a "Subway Series", since New York's subway did not open until 1904, but it was the first recorded series involving the teams who would later earn the phrase.

The New York Giants squared off against (and defeated) the Brooklyn Bridegrooms, also called the "Trolley Dodgers", of the American Association. The following season, Brooklyn withdrew from the Association and joined the League, setting the stage for many future intra-city competitions.

== Early and mid-20th century Subway Series ==
By the 1920s, the subway had become an important form of public transport in the city and provided a convenient form of travel between the three city ballparks: the Polo Grounds, in upper Manhattan; Yankee Stadium, in the Bronx; and Ebbets Field in Brooklyn. The 155th Street elevated and subway stations, the 161st Street station, and the Prospect Park station respectively, served the ballparks. (New York's subway and elevated systems—the IRT, BRT/BMT, and IND—were in competition with each other until 1940.)

In the case of the World Series contests listed, the entire Series could be attended by using the subway. The date of the first usage of the term "Subway Series" is uncertain. The term "Nickel Series" (a nickel was the old subway fare) appeared in newspapers by 1927, and "Subway Series" appeared by 1928. "Subway Series" was clearly already a familiar concept by 1934, as discussed in this article about that year's All-Star Game to be held in New York, discussing the "subway series" possibility for the Giants and Yankees. (Ultimately, no New York team made it to the 1934 post-season.)

=== Yankees–Giants ===
The 1921 and 1922 match-ups were played in a single ballpark, as both the Giants and Yankees then played at the Polo Grounds. The Giants won both of these World Series against the Yankees, the first two Subway Series played. Despite cordial relations just a few years before when the Yankees allowed the Giants to share their home at Hilltop Park for a year in 1911 and the Giants more than returning the favor in kind by sharing Polo Grounds with the Yankees since 1913, the Yankees were issued an eviction notice in mid-1920, ending their lease after the 1922 season. The Yankees opened their new ballpark in 1923. Fortunes changed immediately for the Yankees as they defeated the Giants this time in the third straight year of World Series competition between the two teams. Their new home would host the Yankees' first of 11 Subway World Series victories that year and first of an unprecedented 37 World Series until the stadium closed in 2008.

The venues for the 1923, 1936, 1937, and 1951 World Series—the Polo Grounds and the old Yankee Stadium—were a short walk apart across the Macombs Dam Bridge over the Harlem River.

=== Yankees–Dodgers ===
The term was used again in 1941 when the Dodgers made their first World Series appearance since 1920. Multiple Hall of Famers took part in these contests between the "Bronx Bombers" and "Dem Bums from Brooklyn" and the games involved numerous achievements including Jackie Robinson breaking the color barrier as the first African-American baseball player in the World Series and Don Larsen's performance in pitching the only perfect game in post-season history. The seven matchups between the Yankees and the Dodgers between 1941 and 1956 cemented the term as being mostly associated with the New York vs. Brooklyn contests, during the time when New York City was retroactively dubbed by historians as "The Capital of Baseball". Despite Brooklyn's repeated success at winning the National League pennant, it was only able to win one World Series (1955) against the Yankees, the only time the Dodgers won a championship when in Brooklyn.

== World Series matchups ==
All-New York match-ups in World Series play:

National League team
American League team

Year	Winning team	Manager	Games	Losing team	Manager	Ref.
1921	New York Giants	John McGraw	5‍–‍3^{[V]}	New York Yankees	Miller Huggins	
1922	New York Giants	John McGraw	4‍–‍0‍–‍(1)^{[T]}	New York Yankees	Miller Huggins	
1923	New York Yankees	Miller Huggins	4‍–‍2	New York Giants	John McGraw	
1936	New York Yankees	Joe McCarthy	4‍–‍2	New York Giants	Bill Terry	
1937	New York Yankees	Joe McCarthy	4‍–‍1	New York Giants	Bill Terry	
1941	New York Yankees	Joe McCarthy	4‍–‍1	Brooklyn Dodgers	Leo Durocher	
1947	New York Yankees	Bucky Harris	4‍–‍3	Brooklyn Dodgers	Burt Shotton	
1949	New York Yankees	Casey Stengel	4‍–‍1	Brooklyn Dodgers	Burt Shotton	
1951	New York Yankees	Casey Stengel	4‍–‍2	New York Giants	Leo Durocher	
1952	New York Yankees	Casey Stengel	4‍–‍3	Brooklyn Dodgers	Charlie Dressen	
1953	New York Yankees	Casey Stengel	4‍–‍2	Brooklyn Dodgers	Charlie Dressen	
1955	Brooklyn Dodgers	Walter Alston	4‍–‍3	New York Yankees	Casey Stengel	
1956	New York Yankees	Casey Stengel	4‍–‍3	Brooklyn Dodgers	Walter Alston	
2000	New York Yankees	Joe Torre	4‍–‍1	New York Mets^{[W]}	Bobby Valentine	

== Exhibition series ==
In addition to the five World Series played between the Yankees and Giants before 1940, the two teams also played exhibition series against each other from time to time. The match-ups were known as the "City Series" and were sometimes played in October while other teams played in the World Series. However, after 1940, this became difficult because the Yankees would routinely appear in the World Series. In the 17 years from 1941 to 1957 (after which the Giants and Dodgers left New York City for California), the Yankees appeared in the World Series 12 times, failing to reach the Series only in 1944, 1945, 1946, 1948, and 1954.

The first and only game that featured the Dodgers, Giants, and Yankees was the 1944 Tri-Cornered Baseball Game. The game was a World War II fundraiser, which saw the three teams play in a round-robin format in which each team batted and fielded during six innings and rested for the other three.

Before New York's two National League teams left the city, the Yankees and Giants (from 1946‍–‍1950, 1955) and Yankees and Dodgers (1951‍–‍1954, 1957) played an annual midseason exhibition game called the Mayor's Trophy Game to benefit sandlot baseball in New York City. The proceeds raised by the Yankees were given to leagues in Manhattan and the Bronx, while proceeds raised by the Dodgers went to leagues on Long Island and Staten Island. The annual charity event was discontinued following the 1957 season, when the Dodgers moved to Los Angeles and the Giants moved to San Francisco, leaving the Yankees as the only major league team in the city.

The game was revived in 1963, after the National League returned to New York with the expansion New York Mets in 1962. These games were played primarily to benefit sandlot baseball in the city, with proceeds going to the city's Amateur Baseball Federation. After dwindling interest and public bickering between the owners of both teams, the Mayor's Trophy Game was discontinued following the 1983 season. It was revived again as a pre-Opening Day series titled the "Mayor's Challenge" and held in 1989.

Mayor's Trophy Game (Giants vs. Yankees)
Season	Date	Location	Visiting team	Runs	Home team	Attendance	Series	Cumulative record
1946	July 1	Polo Grounds	Yankees	3‍–‍0	Giants	27,486	Yankees 1‍–‍0‍–‍0	Yankees 1‍–‍0
1946	August 5	Yankee Stadium	Giants	2‍–‍3	Yankees	25,067	Yankees 1‍–‍0‍–‍0	Yankees 2‍–‍0
1947	June 12	Polo Grounds	Yankees	7‍–‍0	Giants	39,970	Yankees 1‍–‍0‍–‍1	Yankees 3‍–‍0
1947	August 18	Yankee Stadium	Giants	4‍–‍1	Yankees	22,184	Yankees 1‍–‍0‍–‍1	Yankees 3‍–‍1
1948	August 16	Polo Grounds	Yankees	4‍–‍2 (11)	Giants	17,091	Yankees 2‍–‍0‍–‍1	Yankees 4‍–‍1
1949	June 27	Yankee Stadium	Giants	3‍–‍5	Yankees	37,547	Yankees 3‍–‍0‍–‍1	Yankees 5‍–‍1
1950	June 26	Polo Grounds	Yankees	9‍–‍4	Giants	12,864	Yankees 4‍–‍0‍–‍1	Yankees 6‍–‍1
1955	June 27	Yankee Stadium	Giants	1‍–‍4	Yankees	19,193	Yankees 5‍–‍0‍–‍1	Yankees 7‍–‍1
Mayor's Trophy Game (Dodgers vs. Yankees)
Season	Date	Location	Visiting team	Runs	Home team	Attendance	Record	
1951	June 25	Yankee Stadium	Dodgers	3‍–‍4 (10)	Yankees	71,289	Yankees 1‍–‍0	
1952	July 21	Yankee Stadium	Dodgers	3‍–‍5	Yankees	48,263	Yankees 2‍–‍0	
1953	June 29	Yankee Stadium	Dodgers	9‍–‍0	Yankees	56,136	Yankees 2‍–‍1	
1954	June 14	Yankee Stadium	Dodgers	2‍–‍1	Yankees	28,084	Tied 2‍–‍2	
1957	May 23	Ebbets Field	Yankees	10‍–‍7	Dodgers	30,000	Yankees 3‍–‍2	
Mayor's Trophy Game (Mets vs. Yankees)
Season	Date	Location	Visiting team	Runs	Home team	Attendance	Record	
1963	June 20	Yankee Stadium	Mets	6‍–‍2	Yankees	50,742	Mets 1‍–‍0‍–‍0	
1964	August 24	Shea Stadium	Yankees	6‍–‍4	Mets	55,396	Tied 1‍–‍1‍–‍0	
1965	May 3	Yankee Stadium	Mets	2‍–‍1 (10)	Yankees	22,881	Mets 2‍–‍1‍–‍0	
1966	June 27	Shea Stadium	Yankees	5‍–‍2	Mets	56,367	Tied 2‍–‍2‍–‍0	
1967	July 12	Yankee Stadium	Mets	4‍–‍0	Yankees	31,852	Mets 3‍–‍2‍–‍0	
1968	May 27	Shea Stadium	Yankees	3‍–‍4	Mets	35,198	Mets 4‍–‍2‍–‍0	
1969	September 29	Shea Stadium	Yankees	6‍–‍7	Mets	32,720	Mets 5‍–‍2‍–‍0	
1970	August 17	Yankee Stadium	Mets	4‍–‍9	Yankees	43,987	Mets 5‍–‍3‍–‍0	
1971	September 8	Shea Stadium	Yankees	2‍–‍1	Mets	48,872	Mets 5‍–‍4‍–‍0	
1972	August 24	Yankee Stadium	Mets	1‍–‍2	Yankees	52,308	Tied 5‍–‍5‍–‍0	
1973	May 10	Shea Stadium	Yankees	4‍–‍8	Mets	—	Mets 6‍–‍5‍–‍0	
1974	May 30	Shea Stadium	Yankees	9‍–‍4	Mets	35,894	Tied 6‍–‍6‍–‍0	
1975	May 15	Shea Stadium	Yankees	9‍–‍4	Mets	—	Yankees 7‍–‍6‍–‍0	
1976	June 14	Yankee Stadium	Mets	4‍–‍8	Yankees	36,361	Yankees 8‍–‍6‍–‍0	
1977	June 23	Shea Stadium	Yankees	4‍–‍6	Mets	15,510	Yankees 8‍–‍7‍–‍0	
1978	April 27	Yankee Stadium	Mets	3‍–‍4 (11)	Yankees	9,792	Yankees 9‍–‍7‍–‍0	
1979	April 16	Shea Stadium	Yankees	1‍–‍1 (5)	Mets	13,719	Yankees 9‍–‍7‍–‍1	
1982	May 27	Yankee Stadium	Mets	4‍–‍1	Yankees	41,614	Yankees 9‍–‍8‍–‍1	
1983	April 21	Shea Stadium	Yankees	4‍–‍1	Mets	20,471	Yankees 10‍–‍8‍–‍1	

== Modern usage ==
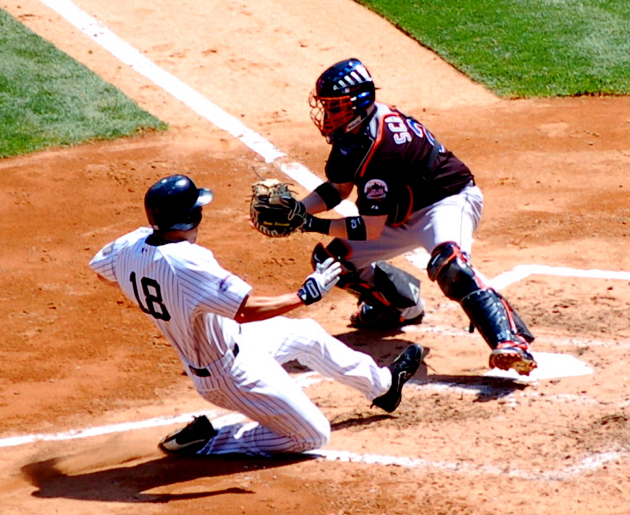
Subway Series 2008, Johnny Damon with the Yankees (left) and Brian Schneider with the Mets

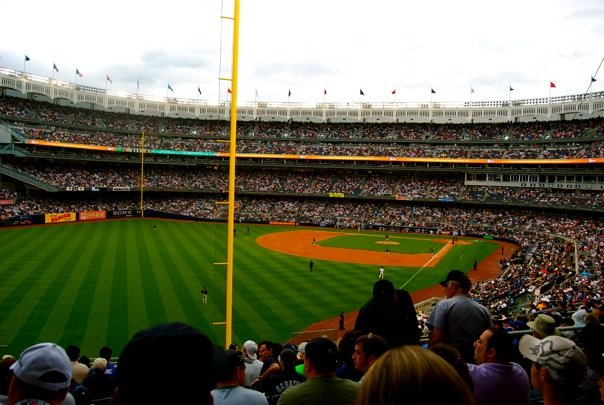
A full house at the new Yankee Stadium for a Subway Series game against the Mets on June 13, 2009. The Mets won the game 6–2.

In modern usage, the term "Subway Series" generally refers to a series played between the two current New York baseball teams, the New York Yankees and the New York Mets. Their stadiums remain directly accessible by subway: Yankee Stadium via the 161st Street–Yankee Stadium station, and Citi Field via the Mets–Willets Point station.

With the departure of the Dodgers and Giants in the 1950s, New York was left without a crosstown rivalry. Even with the Mets joining MLB they were placed in the National League opposite of the Yankees. When interleague play was introduced in 1997 the teams finally got to play one another in a competitive fashion. The rivalry has included heated moments such as the Roger Clemens and Mike Piazza feud. Currently the Yankees lead the "Subway Series" with the Mets 84–65 all time, as of June 26, 2024.

=== Mets–Yankees ===
The Mets and Yankees first met in a regular season game on June 16, 1997, with the introduction of interleague play. The Mets won the game 6–0. The Yankees took the next two games to win the series, all three being played at Yankee Stadium. 1999 marked the first year of this rendition of the Subway Series to be two three-game series, three hosted by the Mets and three hosted by the Yankees. The Mets won the series for the first time in 2004, four games to two. The Yankees lead the series all time with 11 series wins to the Mets 3 series wins with there being 10 ties. The Yankees lead in head-to-head wins 75-52, counting postseason.

The first two series in the rivalry were only one three-game series hosted by one team, alternating each year. From 1999 to 2012 the series was changed to two three-game series, with each team hosting three games. This format changed in 2013 to two series of two games hosted by each team, except in years that the AL East and NL east play each year when it goes back to a three-game series.

The Mets and Yankees have played each other in games that live on as classics. The Yankees beat the Mets in the 2000 World Series 4 games to 1. This series included the infamous Mike Piazza and Roger Clemens incident. Clemens, of the Yankees, threw part of a broken bat at Piazza, of the Mets, after a hit. On June 12, 2009 Luis Castillo of the Mets dropped a popup hit by Alex Rodriguez giving the Yankees a win in the series. On May 19, 2006, David Wright, the Mets' third baseman, had a walkoff hit off Yankees' star reliever Mariano Rivera to cap off a Mets comeback.

=== 2000 World Series ===
The first Subway Series in New York since 1956 was the 2000 World Series between the New York Yankees and the New York Mets. The Yankees won four games to one and celebrated their 26th championship in front of Mets fans at Shea Stadium.

During the 2000 World Series, the city decorated some of the trains that ran on the 7 train (which went to Shea Stadium in Queens, home of the Mets) and 4 train (which went to the old Yankee Stadium in the Bronx, home of the Yankees). The 7 trains were blue and orange and featured the Mets version of the "NY" logo, and the 4 trains were white with blue pinstripes and featured the Yankees version of the "NY" logo. Also, after each game in the series the city offered free subway rides home for attendees of the game. Yankee fans displayed signs that read "Yankees in 4 and not in 7", predicting that the Yankees would easily dispatch the Mets in a Series sweep as opposed to a difficult, full-length Series. The signs had the 4 in a dark green circle designating the number 4 train, and the 7 in a purple circle designating the number 7 train.

== Club success ==
Team	World Series titles	League pennants	Division titles	Wild card berths	Playoff appearances	World Series appearances	All-time regular season record	Win percentage	Seasons played
Brooklyn Dodgers	1	13	—	—	9	9	5,693‍–‍5,365‍–‍133	.515	74
New York Giants	5	17	—	—	14	14	6,067‍–‍4,898‍–‍157	.553	75
New York Mets	2	5	6	5	11	5	4,899‍–‍5,227‍–‍8	.484	64
New York Yankees	27	41	21	10	60	41	10,872‍–‍8,216‍–‍88	.569	123
Combined	35	76	27	15	94	69	27,531‍–‍23,706‍–‍386	.537	143 in NY 336 total

Note: Brooklyn Dodgers' and New York Giants' last season in New York was 1957.
Pennants won by all teams include pennants won before the modern World Series.
As of the 2025 season.

=== Results ===
NYM vs. NYY	Mets wins	Yankees wins	Mets runs	Yankees runs
Regular season	72	86	723	749
World Series	1	4	16	19
Total	73	90	739	768

Updated to most recent meeting, September 13, 2026.

==== Historical ====
BRO vs. NYY	Dodgers wins	Yankees wins	Dodgers runs	Yankees runs
World Series	14	23	152	199

NYG vs. NYY	Giants wins	Yankees wins	Giants runs	Yankees runs
World Series	16	19	117	163

== See also ==
- Cubs–White Sox rivalry
- Knicks–Nets rivalry
- Islanders–Rangers rivalry
- Devils–Rangers rivalry
- Giants–Jets rivalry
- Hudson River Derby
- Dodgers–Giants rivalry

== Notes ==
- ^{T} The 1907, 1912, and 1922 World Series each included one tied game.
- ^{V} The 1903, 1919, 1920, and 1921 World Series were in a best-of-nine format (carried by the first team to win five games).
