= 1921 St. Louis Cardinals season =

Major League Baseball season

1921 St. Louis Cardinals
- League: National League
- Ballpark: Sportsman's Park
- City: St. Louis, Missouri
- Record: 87–66 (.569)
- League place: 3rd
- Owners: Sam Breadon
- Managers: Branch Rickey

The 1921 St. Louis Cardinals season was the team's 40th season in St. Louis, Missouri and the 30th season in the National League. The Cardinals went 87–66 during the season and finished third in the National League.

== Regular season ==
Rogers Hornsby hit .397 in 1921, and his 21 home runs were second in the league. He also led the league in on-base percentage (.458), slugging percentage (.639), runs (131), RBI (126), doubles (44), and triples (18).

=== Season standings ===
National League
Team	W	L	Pct.	GB	Home	Road
New York Giants	94	59	.614	—	53‍–‍26	41‍–‍33
Pittsburgh Pirates	90	63	.588	4	45‍–‍31	45‍–‍32
St. Louis Cardinals	87	66	.569	7	48‍–‍29	39‍–‍37
Boston Braves	79	74	.516	15	42‍–‍32	37‍–‍42
Brooklyn Robins	77	75	.507	16½	41‍–‍37	36‍–‍38
Cincinnati Reds	70	83	.458	24	40‍–‍36	30‍–‍47
Chicago Cubs	64	89	.418	30	32‍–‍44	32‍–‍45
Philadelphia Phillies	51	103	.331	43½	29‍–‍47	22‍–‍56

=== Record vs. opponents ===
1921 National League record Sources:
Team	BSN	BRO	CHC	CIN	NYG	PHI	PIT	STL
Boston	—	11–11	14–8	13–9	8–13	14–8	9–13	10–12
Brooklyn	11–11	—	10–11	10–11	12–10	16–6	10–12	8–14
Chicago	8–14	11–10	—	13–9	8–14	11–11	5–17	8–14
Cincinnati	9–13	11–10	9–13	—	8–14	13–9	8–14	12–10
New York	13–8	10–12	14–8	14–8	—	16–6	16–6	11–11
Philadelphia	8–14	6–16	11–11	9–13	6–16	—	4–18	7–15
Pittsburgh	13–9	12–10	17–5	14–8	6–16	18–4	—	10–11–1
St. Louis	12–10	14–8	14–8	10–12	11–11	15–7	11–10–1	—

=== Roster ===
1921 St. Louis Cardinals
Roster
Pitchers: Bill Bailey; Bill Doak; Marv Goodwin; Jesse Haines; Mike Kircher; Jakie May; Lou North; Bill Pertica; Jeff Pfeffer; Tink Riviere; Ferdie Schupp; Bill Sherdel; Roy Walker	Catchers: Eddie Ainsmith; Verne Clemons; Pickles Dillhoefer; Charlie Niebergall; Infielders: Reuben Ewing; Jack Fournier; Rogers Hornsby; Herb Hunter; Hal Janvrin; Doc Lavan; Milt Stock; Specs Toporcer	Outfielders: Cliff Heathcote; Howie Jones; Les Mann; Austin McHenry; Heinie Mueller; Joe Schultz; Burt Shotton; Jack Smith; Other batters: George Gilham; Walt Irwin; Lew McCarty	Manager: Branch Rickey; Coaches: Joe Sugden

== Player stats ==
=== Batting ===
==== Starters by position ====
Note: Pos = Position; G = Games played; AB = At bats; H = Hits; Avg. = Batting average; HR = Home runs; RBI = Runs batted in

Pos	Player	G	AB	H	Avg.	HR	RBI
C	Verne Clemons	117	341	109	.320	2	48
1B	Jack Fournier	149	574	197	.343	16	86
2B	Rogers Hornsby	154	592	235	.397	21	126
SS	Doc Lavan	150	560	145	.259	2	82
3B	Milt Stock	149	587	180	.307	3	84
OF	Austin McHenry	152	574	201	.350	17	102
OF	Jack Smith	116	411	135	.328	7	33
OF	Les Mann	97	256	84	.328	7	30

==== Other batters ====
Note: G = Games played; AB = At bats; H = Hits; Avg. = Batting average; HR = Home runs; RBI = Runs batted in

Player	G	AB	H	Avg.	HR	RBI
Joe Schultz	92	275	85	.309	6	45
Heinie Mueller	55	176	62	.352	1	34
Pickles Dillhoefer	76	162	39	.241	0	15
Cliff Heathcote	62	156	38	.244	0	9
Eddie Ainsmith	27	62	18	.290	0	5
Specs Toporcer	22	53	14	.264	0	2
Burt Shotton	38	48	12	.250	1	7
Hal Janvrin	18	32	9	.281	0	5
Charlie Niebergall	5	6	1	.167	0	0
Herb Hunter	9	2	0	.000	0	0
Howie Jones	3	2	0	.000	0	0
George Gilham	1	1	0	.000	0	0
Lew McCarty	1	1	0	.000	0	0
Walt Irwin	4	1	0	.000	0	0
Reuben Ewing	3	1	0	.000	0	0

=== Pitching ===
==== Starting pitchers ====
Note: G = Games pitched; IP = Innings pitched; W = Wins; L = Losses; ERA = Earned run average; SO = Strikeouts

Player	G	IP	W	L	ERA	SO
Jesse Haines	37	244.1	18	12	3.50	84
Bill Doak	32	208.2	15	6	2.59	83
Bill Pertica	38	208.1	14	10	3.37	67
Jeff Pfeffer	18	98.2	9	3	4.29	22
Jakie May	5	21.0	1	3	4.71	5

==== Other pitchers ====
Note: G = Games pitched; IP = Innings pitched; W = Wins; L = Losses; ERA = Earned run average; SO = Strikeouts

Player	G	IP	W	L	ERA	SO
Roy Walker	38	170.2	11	12	4.22	52
Bill Sherdel	38	144.1	9	8	3.18	57
Bill Bailey	19	74.0	2	5	4.26	20
Ferdie Schupp	9	37.1	2	0	4.10	22
Marv Goodwin	14	36.1	1	2	3.72	7

==== Relief pitchers ====
Note: G = Games pitched; W = Wins; L = Losses; SV = Saves; ERA = Earned run average; SO = Strikeouts

Player	G	W	L	SV	ERA	SO
Lou North	40	4	4	7	3.54	28
Tink Riviere	18	1	0	0	6.10	15
Mike Kircher	3	0	1	0	8.10	2

== Awards and honors ==
- Rogers Hornsby, National League batting champion
- Top 12 Players of the season:
  1. Rogers Hornsby (WAR 10.8)
  2. Austin McHenry (WAR 5.1)
  3. Jack Fournier (WAR 4.2)
  4. Bill Doak (WAR 3.0)
  5. Verne Clemons (WAR 2.5)
  6. Jack Smith (WAR 2.3)
  7. Les Mann (WAR 2.3)
  8. Milt Stock (WAR 2.0)
  9. Doc Lavan (WAR 1.9)
  10. Jesse Haines (WAR 1.8)
  11. Bill Sherdel (WAR 1.6)
  12. Joe Schultz (WAR 1.5)

== Farm system ==
Level	Team	League	Manager
AA	Syracuse Stars	International League	Tom Madden and Frank Shaughnessy
A	Houston Buffaloes	Texas League	George Whiteman
