= 1921 New York Giants season =

1921 New York Giants
- World Series champions National League champions
- League: National League
- Ballpark: Polo Grounds
- City: New York City
- Record: 94–59 (.614)
- League place: 1st
- Owners: Charles Stoneham
- Managers: John McGraw

The 1921 New York Giants season was the franchise's 39th season, which culminated in the Giants defeating the New York Yankees in the World Series.

== Regular season ==
=== Season standings ===
National League
Team	W	L	Pct.	GB	Home	Road
New York Giants	94	59	.614	—	53‍–‍26	41‍–‍33
Pittsburgh Pirates	90	63	.588	4	45‍–‍31	45‍–‍32
St. Louis Cardinals	87	66	.569	7	48‍–‍29	39‍–‍37
Boston Braves	79	74	.516	15	42‍–‍32	37‍–‍42
Brooklyn Robins	77	75	.507	16½	41‍–‍37	36‍–‍38
Cincinnati Reds	70	83	.458	24	40‍–‍36	30‍–‍47
Chicago Cubs	64	89	.418	30	32‍–‍44	32‍–‍45
Philadelphia Phillies	51	103	.331	43½	29‍–‍47	22‍–‍56

=== Record vs. opponents ===
1921 National League record Sources:
Team	BSN	BRO	CHC	CIN	NYG	PHI	PIT	STL
Boston	—	11–11	14–8	13–9	8–13	14–8	9–13	10–12
Brooklyn	11–11	—	10–11	10–11	12–10	16–6	10–12	8–14
Chicago	8–14	11–10	—	13–9	8–14	11–11	5–17	8–14
Cincinnati	9–13	11–10	9–13	—	8–14	13–9	8–14	12–10
New York	13–8	10–12	14–8	14–8	—	16–6	16–6	11–11
Philadelphia	8–14	6–16	11–11	9–13	6–16	—	4–18	7–15
Pittsburgh	13–9	12–10	17–5	14–8	6–16	18–4	—	10–11–1
St. Louis	12–10	14–8	14–8	10–12	11–11	15–7	11–10–1	—

=== Roster ===
1921 New York Giants
Roster
Pitchers: Jesse Barnes; Rube Benton; Red Causey; Phil Douglas; Claude Jonnard; Art Nehf; Pol Perritt; Rosy Ryan; Slim Sallee; Red Shea; Fred Toney; Walter Zink	Catchers: Alex Gaston; Earl Smith; Frank Snyder; Infielders: Dave Bancroft; Joe Berry; Frankie Frisch; Mike González; Bud Heine; George Kelly; Wally Kopf; Jim Mahady; John Monroe; Pat Patterson; Goldie Rapp; Johnny Rawlings; Hank Schreiber	Outfielders: Eddie Brown; George Burns; Joe Connolly; Bill Cunningham; Lee King; Irish Meusel; Casey Stengel; Curt Walker; Ross Youngs; Other batters: Butch Henline	Manager: John McGraw; Coaches: Jesse Burkett; Hughie Jennings; Christy Mathewson

== Player stats ==
=== Batting ===
==== Starters by position ====
Note: Pos = Position; G = Games played; AB = At bats; H = Hits; Avg. = Batting average; HR = Home runs; RBI = Runs batted in

Pos	Player	G	AB	H	Avg.	HR	RBI
C	Frank Snyder	108	309	99	.320	8	45
1B	High Pockets Kelly	149	587	181	.308	23	122
2B	Johnny Rawlings	86	307	82	.267	1	30
SS	Dave Bancroft	153	606	193	.318	6	67
3B	Frankie Frisch	153	618	211	.341	8	100
OF	Ross Youngs	141	504	165	.327	3	102
OF	George Burns	149	605	181	.299	4	61
OF	Irish Meusel	62	243	80	.329	2	36

==== Other batters ====
Note: G = Games played; AB = At bats; H = Hits; Avg. = Batting average; HR = Home runs; RBI = Runs batted in

Player	G	AB	H	Avg.	HR	RBI
Earl Smith	89	229	77	.336	10	51
Curt Walker	64	192	55	.286	3	35
Goldie Rapp	58	181	39	.215	0	15
Eddie Brown	70	128	36	.281	0	12
Lee King	39	94	21	.223	0	7
Bill Cunningham	40	76	21	.276	1	12
Pat Patterson	23	35	14	.400	1	5
Mike González	13	24	9	.375	0	0
Casey Stengel	18	22	5	.227	0	2
Alex Gaston	20	22	5	.227	0	3
John Monroe	19	21	3	.143	1	3
Joe Berry	9	6	2	.333	0	2
Hank Schreiber	4	6	2	.333	0	2
Joe Connolly	2	4	0	.000	0	0
Wally Kopf	2	3	1	.333	0	0
Bud Heine	1	2	0	.000	0	0
Butch Henline	1	1	0	.000	0	0
Jim Mahady	1	0	0	----	0	0

=== Pitching ===
==== Starting pitchers ====
Note: G = Games pitched; IP = Innings pitched; W = Wins; L = Losses; ERA = Earned run average; SO = Strikeouts

Player	G	IP	W	L	ERA	SO
Art Nehf	41	260.2	20	10	3.63	67
Jesse Barnes	42	258.2	15	9	3.10	56
Fred Toney	42	249.1	18	11	3.61	63
Phil Douglas	40	221.2	15	10	4.22	55

==== Other pitchers ====
Note: G = Games pitched; IP = Innings pitched; W = Wins; L = Losses; ERA = Earned run average; SO = Strikeouts

Player	G	IP	W	L	ERA	SO
Rosy Ryan	36	147.1	7	10	3.73	58
Rube Benton	18	72.0	5	2	2.88	11
Red Shea	9	32.0	5	2	3.09	10
Red Causey	7	14.2	1	1	2.45	1
Pol Perritt	5	11.2	2	0	3.86	5

==== Relief pitchers ====
Note: G = Games pitched; W = Wins; L = Losses; SV = Saves; ERA = Earned run average; SO = Strikeouts

Player	G	W	L	SV	ERA	SO
Slim Sallee	37	6	4	2	3.64	23
Walter Zink	2	0	0	0	2.25	1
Claude Jonnard	1	0	0	1	0.00	7

== World series ==
=== Game 1 ===
October 5, 1921, at the Polo Grounds (IV) in New York City

Team	1	2	3	4	5	6	7	8	9	R	H	E
New York (A)	1	0	0	0	1	1	0	0	0	3	7	0
New York (N)	0	0	0	0	0	0	0	0	0	0	5	0
W: Carl Mays (1–0) L: Phil Douglas (0–1)

=== Game 2 ===
October 6, 1921, at the Polo Grounds (IV) in New York City

Team	1	2	3	4	5	6	7	8	9	R	H	E
New York (N)	0	0	0	0	0	0	0	0	0	0	2	2
New York (A)	1	0	0	0	0	0	0	2	x	3	3	0
W: Waite Hoyt (1–0) L: Art Nehf (0–1)

=== Game 3 ===
October 7, 1921, at the Polo Grounds (IV) in New York City

Team	1	2	3	4	5	6	7	8	9	R	H	E
New York (A)	0	0	4	0	0	0	0	1	0	5	8	0
New York (N)	0	0	4	0	0	0	8	1	x	13	20	0
W: Jesse Barnes (1–0) L: Jack Quinn (0–1)

=== Game 4 ===
October 9, 1921, at the Polo Grounds (IV) in New York City

Team	1	2	3	4	5	6	7	8	9	R	H	E
New York (N)	0	0	0	0	0	0	0	3	1	4	9	1
New York (A)	0	0	0	0	1	0	0	0	1	2	7	1
W: Phil Douglas (1–1) L: Carl Mays (1–1)
HR: NYY – Babe Ruth (1)

=== Game 5 ===
October 10, 1921, at the Polo Grounds (IV) in New York City

Team	1	2	3	4	5	6	7	8	9	R	H	E
New York (A)	0	0	1	2	0	0	0	0	0	3	6	1
New York (N)	1	0	0	0	0	0	0	0	0	1	10	1
W: Waite Hoyt (2–0) L: Art Nehf (0–2)

=== Game 6 ===
October 11, 1921, at the Polo Grounds (IV) in New York City

Team	1	2	3	4	5	6	7	8	9	R	H	E
New York (N)	0	3	0	4	0	1	0	0	0	8	13	0
New York (A)	3	2	0	0	0	0	0	0	0	5	7	2
W: Jesse Barnes (2–0) L: Bob Shawkey (0–1)
HR: NYG – Irish Meusel (1), Frank Snyder (1), NYY – Chick Fewster (1)

=== Game 7 ===
October 12, 1921, at the Polo Grounds (IV) in New York City

Team	1	2	3	4	5	6	7	8	9	R	H	E
New York (A)	0	1	0	0	0	0	0	0	0	1	8	1
New York (N)	1	0	0	0	0	0	1	0	x	2	6	0
W: Phil Douglas (2–1) L: Carl Mays (1–2)

=== Game 8 ===
October 13, 1921, at the Polo Grounds (IV) in New York City

Team	1	2	3	4	5	6	7	8	9	R	H	E
New York (N)	1	0	0	0	0	0	0	0	0	1	6	0
New York (A)	0	0	0	0	0	0	0	0	0	0	4	1
W: Art Nehf (1–2) L: Waite Hoyt (2–1)
