= 1921 Brooklyn Robins season =

1921 Brooklyn Robins
- League: National League
- Ballpark: Ebbets Field
- City: Brooklyn, New York
- Record: 77–75 (.507)
- League place: 5th
- Owners: Charles Ebbets, Ed McKeever, Stephen McKeever
- President: Charles Ebbets
- Managers: Wilbert Robinson

Staff ace Burleigh Grimes won 22 games, but the 1921 Brooklyn Robins fell into fifth place.

== Offseason ==
- December 15, 1920: Rube Marquard was traded by the Robins to the Cincinnati Reds for Dutch Ruether.

== Regular season ==
=== Season standings ===
National League
Team	W	L	Pct.	GB	Home	Road
New York Giants	94	59	.614	—	53‍–‍26	41‍–‍33
Pittsburgh Pirates	90	63	.588	4	45‍–‍31	45‍–‍32
St. Louis Cardinals	87	66	.569	7	48‍–‍29	39‍–‍37
Boston Braves	79	74	.516	15	42‍–‍32	37‍–‍42
Brooklyn Robins	77	75	.507	16½	41‍–‍37	36‍–‍38
Cincinnati Reds	70	83	.458	24	40‍–‍36	30‍–‍47
Chicago Cubs	64	89	.418	30	32‍–‍44	32‍–‍45
Philadelphia Phillies	51	103	.331	43½	29‍–‍47	22‍–‍56

=== Record vs. opponents ===
1921 National League record Sources:
Team	BSN	BRO	CHC	CIN	NYG	PHI	PIT	STL
Boston	—	11–11	14–8	13–9	8–13	14–8	9–13	10–12
Brooklyn	11–11	—	10–11	10–11	12–10	16–6	10–12	8–14
Chicago	8–14	11–10	—	13–9	8–14	11–11	5–17	8–14
Cincinnati	9–13	11–10	9–13	—	8–14	13–9	8–14	12–10
New York	13–8	10–12	14–8	14–8	—	16–6	16–6	11–11
Philadelphia	8–14	6–16	11–11	9–13	6–16	—	4–18	7–15
Pittsburgh	13–9	12–10	17–5	14–8	6–16	18–4	—	10–11–1
St. Louis	12–10	14–8	14–8	10–12	11–11	15–7	11–10–1	—

=== Notable transactions ===
- June 18, 1921: Jeff Pfeffer was traded by the Robins to the St. Louis Cardinals for Ferdie Schupp and Hal Janvrin.
- August 31, 1921: Eddie Eayrs was purchased by the Robins from the Boston Braves.

=== Roster ===
1921 Brooklyn Robins
Roster
Pitchers: Sweetbreads Bailey; Leon Cadore; Ray Gordinier; Burleigh Grimes; Al Mamaux; Johnny Miljus; Clarence Mitchell; George Mohart; Jeff Pfeffer; Dutch Ruether; Ferdie Schupp; Sherry Smith	Catchers: Ernie Krueger; Otto Miller; Zack Taylor; Infielders: Hal Janvrin; Jimmy Johnston; Pete Kilduff; Ed Konetchy; Ivy Olson; Ray Schmandt; Jack Sheehan; Chuck Ward	Outfielders: Eddie Eayrs; Tommy Griffith; Wally Hood; Bill Lamar; Hy Myers; Bernie Neis; Zack Wheat	Manager: Wilbert Robinson

== Player stats ==
=== Batting ===
==== Starters by position ====
Note: Pos = Position; G = Games played; AB = At bats; H = Hits; Avg. = Batting average; HR = Home runs; RBI = Runs batted in

Pos	Player	G	AB	H	Avg.	HR	RBI
C	Otto Miller	91	286	67	.234	1	27
1B	Ray Schmandt	95	350	107	.306	1	43
2B	Pete Kilduff	107	372	107	.288	3	45
3B	Jimmy Johnston	152	624	203	.325	5	56
SS	Ivy Olson	151	652	174	.267	3	35
OF	Zack Wheat	148	568	182	.320	14	85
OF	Tommy Griffith	129	455	142	.312	12	71
OF	Hy Myers	144	549	158	.288	4	68

==== Other batters ====
Note: G = Games played; AB = At bats; H = Hits; Avg. = Batting average; HR = Home runs; RBI = Runs batted in

Player	G	AB	H	Avg.	HR	RBI
Bernie Neis	102	230	59	.257	4	34
Ed Konetchy	55	197	53	.269	3	23
Ernie Krueger	65	163	43	.264	3	20
Zack Taylor	30	102	20	.196	0	8
Hal Janvrin	44	92	18	.196	0	14
Wally Hood	56	65	17	.262	1	4
Chuck Ward	12	28	2	.071	0	0
Jack Sheehan	5	12	0	.000	0	0
Eddie Eayrs	8	6	1	.167	0	1
Bill Lamar	3	3	1	.333	0	0

=== Pitching ===
==== Starting pitchers ====
Note: G = Games pitched; IP = Innings pitched; W = Wins; L = Losses; ERA = Earned run average; SO = Strikeouts

Player	G	IP	W	L	ERA	SO
Burleigh Grimes	37	302.1	22	13	2.83	136
Leon Cadore	35	211.2	13	14	4.17	79
Dutch Ruether	36	211.1	10	13	4.26	78
Jeff Pfeffer	6	31.2	1	5	4.55	8
Ray Gordinier	3	12.0	1	0	5.25	4

==== Other pitchers ====
Note: G = Games pitched; IP = Innings pitched; W = Wins; L = Losses; ERA = Earned run average; SO = Strikeouts

Player	G	IP	W	L	ERA	SO
Clarence Mitchell	37	190.0	11	9	2.89	39
Sherry Smith	35	175.1	7	11	3.90	36
Johnny Miljus	28	93.2	6	3	4.23	37
Ferdie Schupp	20	61.0	3	4	4.57	26

==== Relief pitchers ====
Note: G = Games pitched; W = Wins; L = Losses; SV = Saves; ERA = Earned run average; SO = Strikeouts

Player	G	W	L	SV	ERA	SO
Al Mamaux	12	3	3	1	3.14	21
Sweetbreads Bailey	7	0	0	0	5.18	6
George Mohart	2	0	0	0	3.86	1
