= Ollie Chill =

American baseball umpire (1878–1958)

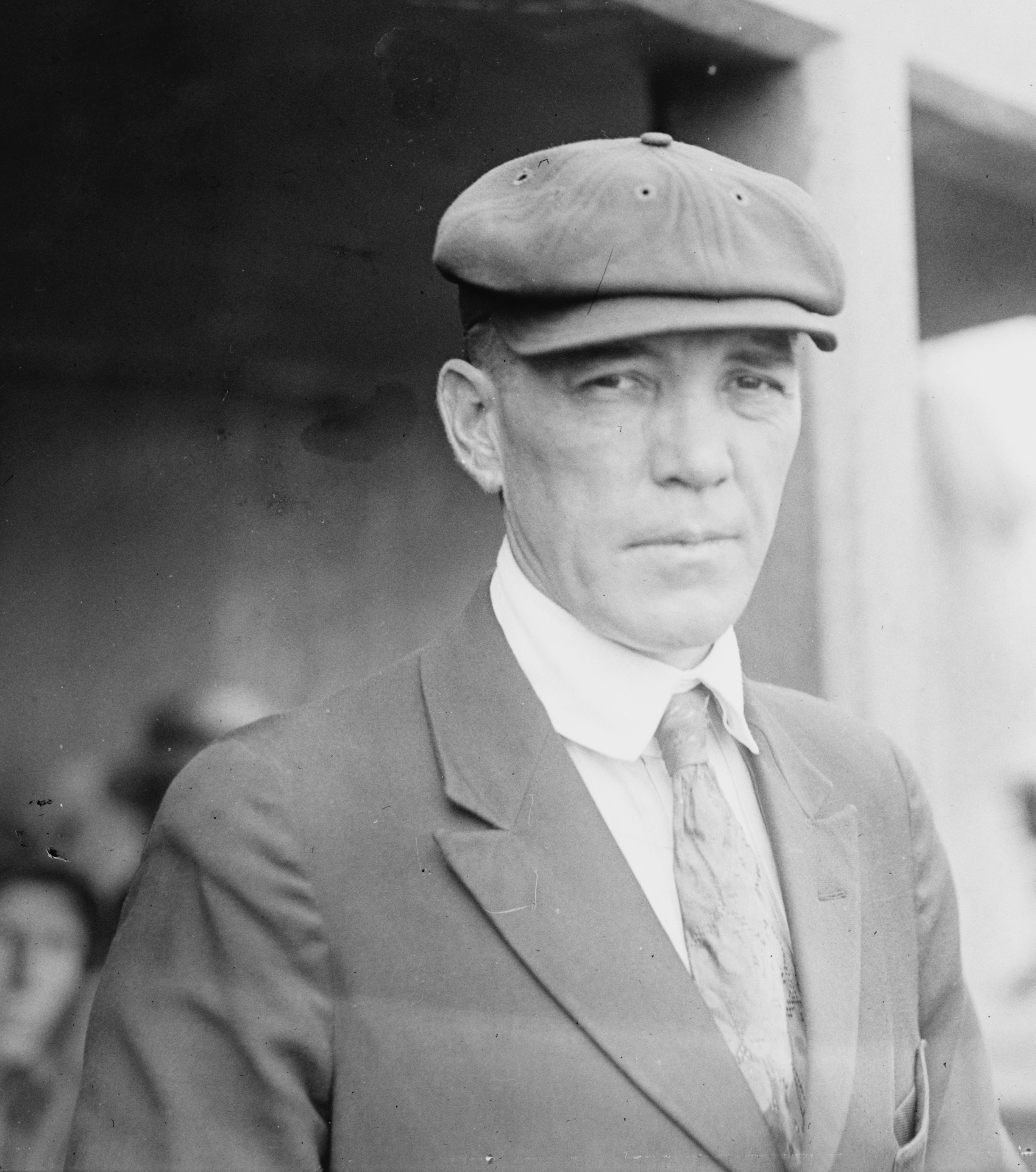
- Born: Oliver Perry Chill; August 2, 1878; Indianapolis, Indiana, U.S.
- Died: May 5, 1958 (aged 79); Los Angeles, California, U.S.
- Occupation: Umpire
- Years active: 1914-1916, 1920-1922
- Employer: American League

Oliver Perry Chill (August 2, 1878 – May 5, 1958) was an American Major League Baseball umpire who worked in the American League from 1914 to 1916 and from 1919 to 1922. Chill umpired in the 1921 World Series. In his career, he umpired 1,028 Major League games. Off the field, Chill was involved in a 1923 fight that led to the shooting death of one man. Though Chill was acquitted of the man's murder and a shooter came forward, he was removed from the American League umpiring staff.

== Umpiring career ==
On May 15, 1914, Chill was attacked after a game at the Polo Grounds by New York Yankees fans who were upset by calls that Chill had made that game. Chill was eventually ushered to the umpires' room by police.

In January 1923, Chill was one of several men questioned in the death of Edward J. McGregor, a man found shot in his apartment in Cleveland after a drunken party. When police broke into the apartment after reports of a shooting, they found Chill under a bed, with the other men each in separate rooms. He was acquitted of the murder later that month, when another man admitted to shooting McGregor after attempting to intervene in a fight between McGregor and Chill only for McGregor to fire twice at him. Nevertheless, Chill was dismissed from the American League by league president Ban Johnson following the incident.

In 1926, Chill was dismissed as an umpire from the American Association for registering at a Kansas City hotel where he had been given specific orders not to stay. In 1927, Chill filed suit against the league for $200,000 in damages, claiming he had been slandered. Chill dropped the suit in November of that year after an out-of-court settlement.

== Personal life ==
Prior to his umpiring career, Chill boxed under the name "Jack Ryan." He also ran a wholesale fish house specializing in Florida stone crab in Pass-a-Grille, Florida.

In 1933, Chill was named as one of Minnesota's official boxing referees after retiring from umpiring in baseball's International League the year before.

== See also ==
- List of Major League Baseball umpires (disambiguation)
