= 1921 Cincinnati Reds season =

1921 Cincinnati Reds
- League: National League
- Ballpark: Redland Field
- City: Cincinnati, Ohio
- Owners: Garry Herrmann
- Managers: Pat Moran

The 1921 Cincinnati Reds season was a season in American baseball. The team finished sixth in the National League with a record of 70–83, 24 games behind the New York Giants. This team is most notable for setting the Major League record for fewest strikeouts in a season with 308.

== Off-season ==
Following a disappointing ending to the 1920 season, in which the Reds lost 17 of their final 25 games to drop out of the National League pennant race, Cincinnati made some moves during the off-season.

On November 20, the club traded away outfielder Greasy Neale and pitcher Jimmy Ring to the Philadelphia Phillies, getting pitcher Eppa Rixey in return. Rixey had spent his entire eight-year career with the Phillies, and in 1920, despite a poor record of 11–22, Rixey had an ERA of 3.48, struck out 110 batters in 284.1 innings pitched, and pitched 25 complete games. His best season came in 1916, as Rixey had a 22–10 record and a 1.85 ERA in 38 games. He played under current Reds manager Pat Moran in Philadelphia.

In December, the Reds picked up outfielder Dode Paskert off of waivers from the Chicago Cubs. Paskert, now 39 years old, had previously played with Cincinnati from 1907 to 1910. With the Cubs in 1920, he appeared in 139 games, batting .279 with five home runs and 71 RBI. The Reds then traded pitcher Dutch Ruether to the Brooklyn Robins for pitcher Rube Marquard. Marquard, a 34 year old veteran, had a 10–7 record with a 3.23 ERA in 28 games with the Robins in 1920. Marquard also previously pitched for the New York Giants, where he had the most success in his career. In 1911, he led the National League with a .774 winning percentage and in strikeouts with 237. The following season, in 1912, he led the National League in wins with 26.

The Reds also acquired catcher Bubbles Hargrave from the St. Paul Saints of the American Association for $10,000. He hit .335 with 22 home runs with the Saints in 1920. The team also acquired second baseman Sam Bohne from the Seattle Rainiers of the Pacific Coast League, where he hit .333 with the club.

== Regular season ==
Cincinnati struggled at the start of the season, as the team had a record of 7–9 in the month of April. The losses continued to pile up in May, with Cincinnati winning only seven of 26 games, to drop their overall record to 14–28, last place in the National League.

At the beginning of June, the Reds picked up outfielder Greasy Neale off of waivers from the Philadelphia Phillies. Neale had previously played with Cincinnati from 1916 to 1920, and the club traded him in the off-season to the Phillies in a deal that brought pitcher Eppa Rixey to the Reds. Neale struggled in Philadelphia, batting .211 with a home run and three RBI in 22 games.

The club played better baseball in June, as in the middle of the month, the Reds had a streak where they won eight of nine games, and while the club moved out of last place into seventh, they were still well behind in the pennant race with a 25–41 by the end of the month.

In July, Cincinnati continued to struggle early in the month, and the team made a move, purchasing pitcher Bob Geary from the Seattle Rainiers of the Pacific Coast League for $10,000. Geary had previous experience in the American League, pitching in 25 games with the Philadelphia Athletics from 1918 until 1919, where he had a 2–8 record and a 3.24 ERA. The Reds finished July with a 16–14 record, their first winning month of the season, as the team improved to 41–55, remaining in seventh place.

The Reds had a second consecutive winning month, as the team went 16–15 in August, and moved into sixth place in the National League. The team continued to play .500 baseball in the last 26 games of the season, going 13-13.

Overall, the club finished the year with a disappointing 71–83, which was their first under .500 record since 1916.

Outfielder Edd Roush led the club with a .352 batting average with four home runs and 71 RBI in 112 games. Third baseman Heinie Groh hit .311 with 48 RBI in only 97 games. First baseman Jake Daubert batted .306 with two home runs and 64 RBI in 136 games, while rookie second baseman Sam Bohne hit .285 with three home runs, 44 RBI and a team high 26 stolen bases in 153 games. Outfielder Pat Duncan had another very solid season with a .308 batting average, two home runs and 60 RBI in 145 games.

Newly acquired Eppa Rixey led the Reds in wins, as he had a 19–18 record with a team best 2.78 ERA in 301 innings pitched in 40 games. Dolf Luque finished the season with a 17–19 record and had a 3.38 ERA, as well as a team best 304 innings pitched and 102 strikeouts and 25 complete games in 41 games pitched. Rube Marquard, also in his first season with Cincinnati, had a solid 17–14 record with a 3.39 ERA over 265.2 innings pitched in 39 games.

=== Season standings ===
National League
Team	W	L	Pct.	GB	Home	Road
New York Giants	94	59	.614	—	53‍–‍26	41‍–‍33
Pittsburgh Pirates	90	63	.588	4	45‍–‍31	45‍–‍32
St. Louis Cardinals	87	66	.569	7	48‍–‍29	39‍–‍37
Boston Braves	79	74	.516	15	42‍–‍32	37‍–‍42
Brooklyn Robins	77	75	.507	16½	41‍–‍37	36‍–‍38
Cincinnati Reds	70	83	.458	24	40‍–‍36	30‍–‍47
Chicago Cubs	64	89	.418	30	32‍–‍44	32‍–‍45
Philadelphia Phillies	51	103	.331	43½	29‍–‍47	22‍–‍56

=== Record vs. opponents ===
1921 National League record Sources:
Team	BSN	BRO	CHC	CIN	NYG	PHI	PIT	STL
Boston	—	11–11	14–8	13–9	8–13	14–8	9–13	10–12
Brooklyn	11–11	—	10–11	10–11	12–10	16–6	10–12	8–14
Chicago	8–14	11–10	—	13–9	8–14	11–11	5–17	8–14
Cincinnati	9–13	11–10	9–13	—	8–14	13–9	8–14	12–10
New York	13–8	10–12	14–8	14–8	—	16–6	16–6	11–11
Philadelphia	8–14	6–16	11–11	9–13	6–16	—	4–18	7–15
Pittsburgh	13–9	12–10	17–5	14–8	6–16	18–4	—	10–11–1
St. Louis	12–10	14–8	14–8	10–12	11–11	15–7	11–10–1	—

=== Roster ===
1921 Cincinnati Reds
Roster
Pitchers: Lynn Brenton; Lefty Clarke; Fritz Coumbe; Pete Donohue; Hod Eller; Bob Geary; Dolf Luque; Cliff Markle; Rube Marquard; Buddy Napier; Eppa Rixey; Clint Rogge	Catchers: Astyanax Douglass; Bubbles Hargrave; Ivey Wingo; Infielders: Sam Bohne; Sam Crane; Jake Daubert; Lew Fonseca; Heinie Groh; Wally Kimmick; Larry Kopf	Outfielders: Rube Bressler; Pat Duncan; Kenny Hogan; Greasy Neale; Dode Paskert; Edd Roush; Charlie See; Denny Williams	Manager: Pat Moran

== Player stats ==
= Indicates team leader

=== Batting ===
==== Starters by position ====
Note: Pos = Position; G = Games played; AB = At bats; H = Hits; Avg. = Batting average; HR = Home runs; RBI = Runs batted in

Pos	Player	G	AB	H	Avg.	HR	RBI
C	Ivey Wingo	97	295	79	.268	3	38
1B	Jake Daubert	136	516	158	.306	2	64
2B	Sam Bohne	153	613	175	.285	3	44
SS	Larry Kopf	107	367	80	.218	1	25
3B	Heinie Groh	97	357	118	.331	0	48
OF	Pat Duncan	145	532	164	.308	2	60
OF	Edd Roush	112	418	147	.352	4	71
OF	Rube Bressler	109	323	99	.307	1	54

==== Other batters ====
Note: G = Games played; AB = At bats; H = Hits; Avg. = Batting average; HR = Home runs; RBI = Runs batted in

Player	G	AB	H	Avg.	HR	RBI
Lew Fonseca	82	297	82	.276	1	41
Bubbles Hargrave	93	263	76	.289	1	38
Greasy Neale	63	241	58	.241	0	12
Sam Crane	73	215	50	.233	0	16
Charlie See	37	106	26	.245	1	7
Dode Paskert	27	92	16	.174	0	4
Astyanax Douglass	4	7	1	.143	0	0
Denny Williams	7	7	0	.000	0	0
Wally Kimmick	3	6	1	.167	0	1
Kenny Hogan	1	2	0	.000	0	0

=== Pitching ===
==== Starting pitchers ====
Note: G = Games pitched; IP = Innings pitched; W = Wins; L = Losses; ERA = Earned run average; SO = Strikeouts

Player	G	IP	W	L	ERA	SO
Dolf Luque	41	304.0	17	19	3.38	102
Eppa Rixey	40	301.0	19	18	2.78	76
Rube Marquard	39	265.2	17	14	3.39	88
Lefty Clarke	1	5.0	0	1	5.40	1

==== Other pitchers ====
Note: G = Games pitched; IP = Innings pitched; W = Wins; L = Losses; ERA = Earned run average; SO = Strikeouts

Player	G	IP	W	L	ERA	SO
Pete Donohue	21	118.1	7	6	3.35	44
Fritz Coumbe	28	86.2	3	4	3.22	12
Cliff Markle	10	67.0	2	6	3.76	23
Lynn Brenton	17	60.0	1	8	4.05	19
Buddy Napier	22	56.2	0	2	5.56	14
Clint Rogge	6	35.1	1	2	4.08	12
Hod Eller	13	34.1	2	2	4.98	7

==== Relief pitchers ====
Note: G = Games pitched; W = Wins; L = Losses; SV = Saves; ERA = Earned run average; SO = Strikeouts

Player	G	W	L	SV	ERA	SO
Bob Geary	10	1	1	0	4.34	10
