= 1921 World Series =

Major League Baseball championship series

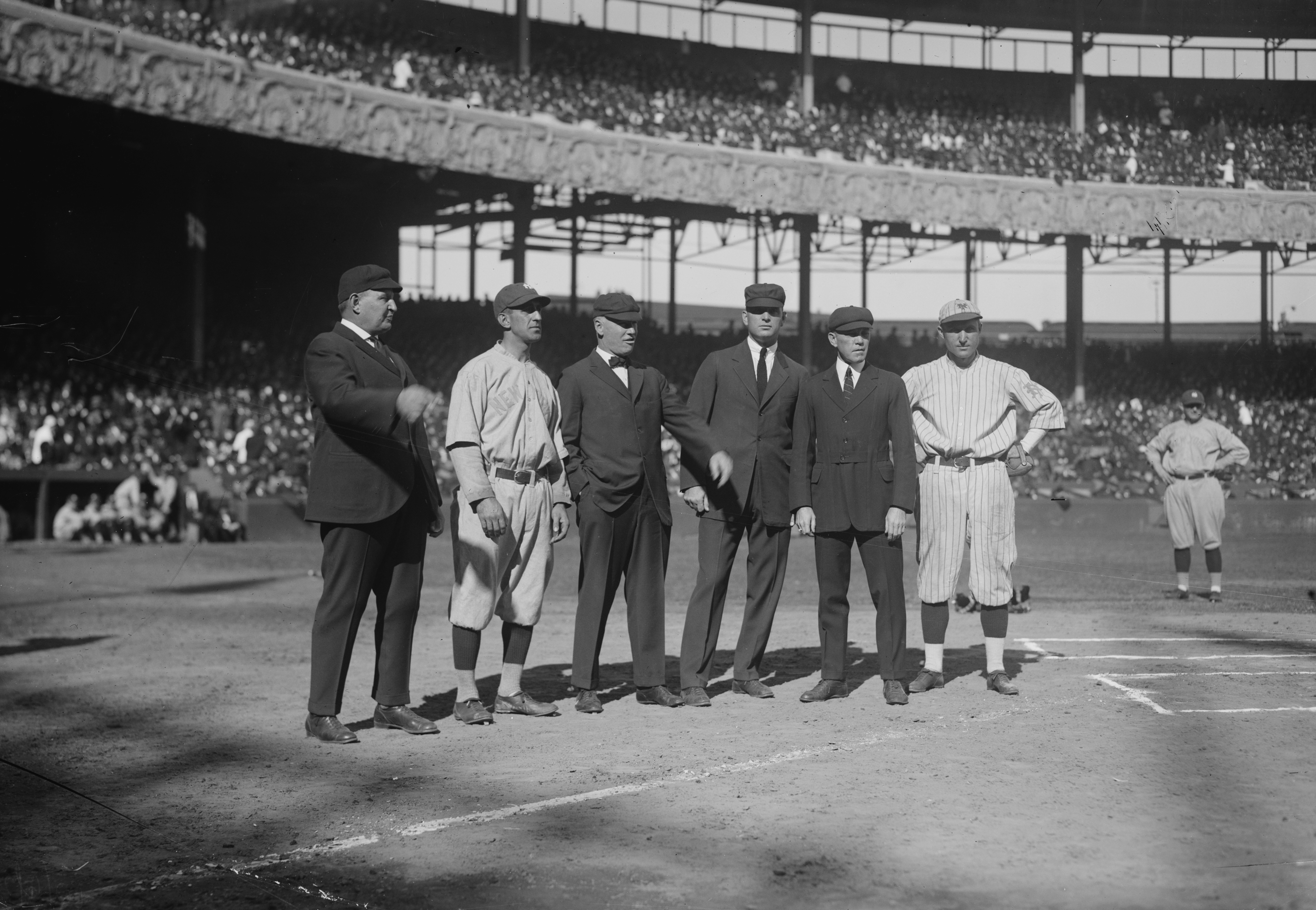
- Yankees player Roger Peckinpaugh, Giants player Dave Bancroft, and umpires at the Polo Grounds.
Team (Wins)	Managers	Season
New York Giants (5)	John McGraw	94–59, .614, GA: 4
New York Yankees (3)	Miller Huggins	98–55, .641, GA: 4 1/2
- Dates: October 5–13
- Venue: Polo Grounds
- Umpires: Cy Rigler (NL), George Moriarty (AL), Ernie Quigley (NL), Ollie Chill (AL)
- Hall of Famers: Giants: John McGraw (manager); Dave Bancroft; Jesse Burkett (coach); Christy Mathewson (coach); Frankie Frisch; George Kelly; Ross Youngs; Yankees: Miller Huggins (manager); Frank Baker; Babe Ruth; Waite Hoyt

Broadcast
- Radio: KDKA (Pittsburgh); WBZ (Springfield); WJZ (Newark); KDKA coverage was live, and direct, from the Polo Grounds. WBZ coverage was relayed via studio re-creation. According to Popular Radio, WJZ covered the games live, with some play by play done by Grantland Rice.
- Radio announcers: KDKA and WJZ: Grantland Rice; WBZ re-created by Tommy Cowan

World Series program
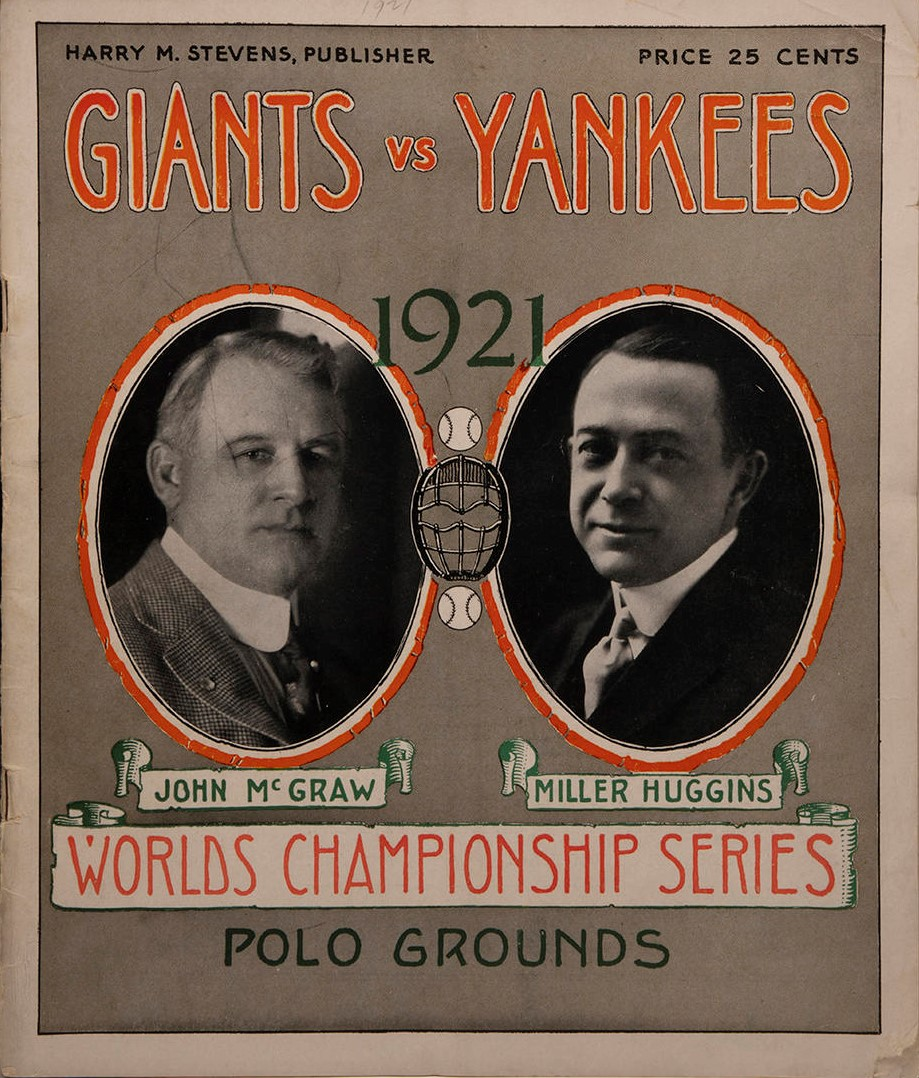

The 1921 World Series was the championship series in Major League Baseball for the 1921 season. The 18th edition of the World Series, it matched the National League (NL) champion New York Giants and the American League (AL) champion New York Yankees.

The Series matched two distinct teams in strategy with the Giants, dedicated practitioners of the dead-ball era's "inside game" and the Yankees, who relied on the "power game" exemplified by Babe Ruth, who was coming off of what was arguably his best year ever statistically. This was the first World Series appearance by the Yankees, who have gone on to play in the Series a record 41 times. The 1921 Series was a closely contested matchup that ended on a double play featuring a baserunning miscue. It was also the last of four World Series to use the best-of-nine format, which had been used in the 1903, 1919, and the 1920 editions. The following year, the World Series permanently switched to a best-of-seven game format where it has remained ever since. It was also the first World Series to be broadcast over radio.

== Background ==
The Series was the last of the experimental best-five-of-nine series, which the Giants won five games to three. All eight games were played at the Polo Grounds in upper Manhattan, New York, each team alternating as the nominal "home team" since the Yankees had subleased the stadium from the Giants for the 1913 through 1922 seasons, so that it was the home park for both teams during the regular season in those ten years. This marked the first time in World Series history that the series occurred at a single site. It happened again the following year in the same place with the same two teams, in 1944 at St. Louis' Sportsman's Park between the Cardinals and the Browns, and then again in 2020 when the COVID-19 pandemic necessitated the first-ever neutral-site Series played at Globe Life Field in Arlington, Texas between the Los Angeles Dodgers and Tampa Bay Rays. For New Yorkers, this was the first subway Series in World Series history. It was also the first World Series to be broadcast on radio, with Grantland Rice covering the games live through Pittsburgh's KDKA. It was rebroadcast on WBZ in Massachusetts. Announcer Tommy Cowan also recreated the games over Westinghouse-owned WJZ in Newark as he listened to phoned-in reports from the stadium.

Because of an infected arm and a bad knee (which he wrenched in Game 5), Babe Ruth did not start the final three games, appearing only as a pinch-hitter in the final inning of Game 8. Following the Series, Ruth and Bob Meusel did some postseason barnstorming, against the rules for Series participants at that time. Both were suspended for a number of games at the start of the 1922 season. Ruth filed a personal appeal with Commissioner Landis, who upheld their suspensions but agreed to rescind the rule effective the end of that season.

Then New York Governor Nathan L. Miller, described as "a big baseball fan" by The New York Times, made plans to attend games as a guest of the Commissioner of Baseball. The Series drew fans to New York City from across the continent, from as far west as California and Mexico to as far south as Cuba. Hotels were booked up, and both the New York Central and Pennsylvania Railroads made plans to add cars and run their trains in sections if necessary to handle the extra traffic expected. Harry L. Davis, then the Governor of Ohio, was expected to attend the games as were several other VIPs of the time.

This was the fourth World Series for Giants' assistant coach "Eee-yah!" Hughie Jennings, who had managed young Ty Cobb and the pennant-winning but Series-losing 1907, 1908 & 1909 Detroit Tigers and had been brought in as an assistant coach for the Giants by John McGraw the previous October after Jennings had resigned from the Tigers. The two were teammates on the old Baltimore Orioles in earlier seasons.

Several players on both teams didn't start the 1921 season with either the Giants or the Yankees, and several others moved to other teams during the regular season earlier that year. For the Giants, Johnny Rawlings, Irish Meusel, Casey Stengel and Red Causey started the season as Philadelphia Phillies, who finished last in the National League that year. Outfielder Bill Cunningham had played for the Seattle Rainiers of the Pacific Coast League, nor did Cozy Dolan or Red Shea start the season with the Giants, while the Yankees acquired outfielder Elmer Miller and pitcher Tom Rogers during the season. Nonparticipants from either team in the Series included Curt Walker, Lee King, Johnny Monroe, Rube Benton, Goldie Rapp, Ping Bodie, Tom Sheehan and Tom Connelly.

This was the first of three consecutive matchups between the Yankees and Giants (1921–1923) and marked the only time (as of 2023) that three straight World Series featured the same two clubs. Brothers Bob and Irish Meusel played against each other in each of those three series, making them the first set of brothers who have competed against each other in multiple championship games, and they did it three years in a row.

== Summary ==
NL New York Giants (5) vs. AL New York Yankees (3)

Game	Date	Score	Location	Time	Attendance
1	October 5	New York Yankees – 3, New York Giants – 0	Polo Grounds	1:38	30,203
2	October 6	New York Giants – 0, New York Yankees – 3	Polo Grounds	1:55	34,939
3	October 7	New York Yankees – 5, New York Giants – 13	Polo Grounds	2:40	36,509
4	October 9	New York Giants – 4, New York Yankees – 2	Polo Grounds	1:38	36,372
5	October 10	New York Yankees – 3, New York Giants – 1	Polo Grounds	1:52	35,758
6	October 11	New York Giants – 8, New York Yankees – 5	Polo Grounds	2:31	34,283
7	October 12	New York Yankees – 1, New York Giants – 2	Polo Grounds	1:40	36,503
8	October 13	New York Giants – 1, New York Yankees – 0	Polo Grounds	1:57	25,410

== Matchups ==
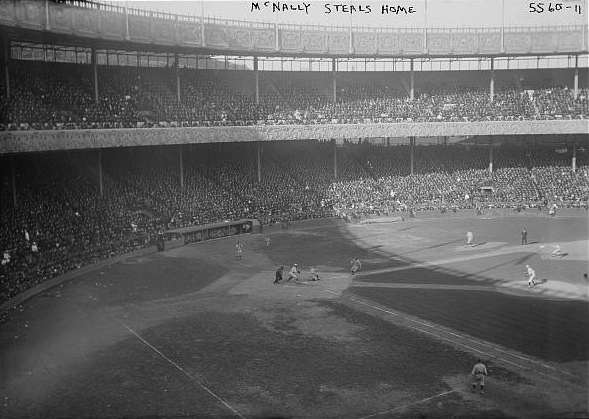
The Polo Grounds during Game 1 of the series.

=== Game 1 ===
Wednesday, October 5, 1921 2:00 pm (ET) at Polo Grounds in Manhattan, New York
Team	1	2	3	4	5	6	7	8	9	R	H	E
New York (AL)	1	0	0	0	1	1	0	0	0	3	7	0
New York (NL)	0	0	0	0	0	0	0	0	0	0	5	0
WP: Carl Mays (1–0) LP: Phil Douglas (0–1)

Mays pitched a complete game 5-hit shutout, Frankie Frisch getting 4 of those hits off of Mays in a losing cause for the Giants. This was the first World Series game victory for the Yankees.

=== Game 2 ===
Thursday, October 6, 1921 2:00 pm (ET) at Polo Grounds in Manhattan, New York
Team	1	2	3	4	5	6	7	8	9	R	H	E
New York (NL)	0	0	0	0	0	0	0	0	0	0	2	2
New York (AL)	0	0	0	1	0	0	0	2	X	3	3	0
WP: Waite Hoyt (1–0) LP: Art Nehf (0–1)

Pitching Ruth carefully, the Giants walked the Babe three times; but after the third walk he stole second and then third base, much to the delight of Yankee fans. But when he slid into third, he scraped his elbow severely and the site became infected. Hoyt held the Giants to two hits, the Yankees jumping to a 2–0 lead in the series.

=== Game 3 ===
Friday, October 7, 1921 2:00 pm (ET) at Polo Grounds in Manhattan, New York
Team	1	2	3	4	5	6	7	8	9	R	H	E
New York (AL)	0	0	4	0	0	0	0	1	0	5	8	0
New York (NL)	0	0	4	0	0	0	8	1	X	13	20	0
WP: Jesse Barnes (1–0) LP: Jack Quinn (0–1)

After getting outscored 6–0 in the first two games of this series and falling behind 4–0 in the top of the third, the Giants tied it with four runs of their own in the bottom half. Later on, an 8-run 7th inning highlighted by Ross Youngs' bases loaded triple turned the tide as the Giants got their first win of this series. Ruth was taken out in the eighth after again scraping his elbow sliding into a base. The Yankees announced after the game that the elbow would have to be lanced and that he would not return for the rest of the Series.

=== Game 4 ===
Sunday, October 9, 1921 2:00 pm (ET) at Polo Grounds in Manhattan, New York
Team	1	2	3	4	5	6	7	8	9	R	H	E
New York (NL)	0	0	0	0	0	0	0	3	1	4	9	1
New York (AL)	0	0	0	0	1	0	0	0	1	2	7	1
WP: Phil Douglas (1–1) LP: Carl Mays (1–1); Home runs: NYG: None; NYY: Babe Ruth (1)

Ruth suited up, but stayed on the bench during batting practice. When the game began, however, to everyone's surprise, he popped out of the dugout and jogged to his outfield position. The crowd roared. He kept touching his bandaged arm throughout the game. Despite the injury, he got two hits including a ninth-inning homer, his first World Series home run as well as the first World Series home run in Yankees franchise history. But the Giants won the game and tied the series at 2–2.

=== Game 5 ===
Monday, October 10, 1921 2:00 pm (ET) at Polo Grounds in Manhattan, New York
Team	1	2	3	4	5	6	7	8	9	R	H	E
New York (AL)	0	0	1	2	0	0	0	0	0	3	6	1
New York (NL)	1	0	0	0	0	0	0	0	0	1	10	1
WP: Waite Hoyt (2–0) LP: Art Nehf (0–2)

Ruth's arm was still bandaged, but he played again. In the fourth, with the score tied 1–1, he shocked everyone by bunting and beating it out. His teammate Meusel then doubled, scoring Ruth all the way from first base for the go-ahead run in a 3–1 Yankee win.

=== Game 6 ===
Tuesday, October 11, 1921 2:00 pm (ET) at Polo Grounds in Manhattan, New York
Team	1	2	3	4	5	6	7	8	9	R	H	E
New York (NL)	0	3	0	4	0	1	0	0	0	8	13	0
New York (AL)	3	2	0	0	0	0	0	0	0	5	7	2
WP: Jesse Barnes (2–0) LP: Bob Shawkey (0–1); Home runs: NYG: Irish Meusel (1), Frank Snyder (1); NYY: Chick Fewster (1)

The Giants battled back from 3–0 and 5–3 deficits to take Game 6.

=== Game 7 ===
Wednesday, October 12, 1921 2:00 pm (ET) at Polo Grounds in Manhattan, New York
Team	1	2	3	4	5	6	7	8	9	R	H	E
New York (AL)	0	1	0	0	0	0	0	0	0	1	8	1
New York (NL)	0	0	0	1	0	0	1	0	X	2	6	0
WP: Phil Douglas (2–1) LP: Carl Mays (1–2)

Phil Douglas scattered eight hits and held the Yankees to one run, the Giants winning 2–1 on Frank Snyder's RBI double in the seventh inning.

=== Game 8 ===
Thursday, October 13, 1921 2:00 pm (ET) at Polo Grounds in Manhattan, New York
Team	1	2	3	4	5	6	7	8	9	R	H	E
New York (NL)	1	0	0	0	0	0	0	0	0	1	6	0
New York (AL)	0	0	0	0	0	0	0	0	0	0	4	1
WP: Art Nehf (1–2) LP: Waite Hoyt (2–1)

Facing elimination, Yankee manager Miller Huggins sent Ruth out to pinch-hit in the bottom of the ninth. The Babe, nursing both elbow and knee injuries, had sat out this game and missed all of Games 6 and 7. The bases were empty and the Yankees still trailed by the lone run of the game scored by the Giants in the top of the first. A HR would tie the game, and a hit or a walk would give the Yankees a chance. But Ruth grounded out, and shortly afterwards Frank Baker hit into a double play after a walk by Aaron Ward who was thrown out at third base for the final out of the Series, giving the Giants their first world championship since Christy Mathewson's record three complete game shutouts in 1905.

== Composite line score ==
1921 World Series (5–3): New York Giants (N.L.) over New York Yankees (A.L.)

Team	1	2	3	4	5	6	7	8	9	R	H	E
New York Giants	2	3	4	5	0	1	9	4	1	29	71	4
New York Yankees	4	3	5	3	2	1	0	3	1	22	50	6
Total attendance: 269,977 Average attendance: 33,747; Winning player's share: $5,265 Losing player's share: $3,510

== See also ==
- 1922 World Series Second World Series match-up between the Giants and the Yankees
- 1923 World Series Third World Series match-up between the Giants and the Yankees
- Subway Series / Giants–Yankees rivalry
