= Phil Morrison (baseball) =

American baseball player (1894–1955)

- Pitcher
- Born: October 18, 1894; Rockport, Indiana
- Died: January 18, 1955 (aged 60); Lexington, Kentucky
- Batted: Both Threw: Right

MLB debut
- September 30, 1921, for the Pittsburgh Pirates

Last MLB appearance
- September 30, 1921, for the Pittsburgh Pirates

MLB statistics
- Win–loss record: 0–0
- Earned run average: 0.00
- Strikeouts: 1
- Stats at Baseball Reference

Teams
- Pittsburgh Pirates (1921)

Philip Melvin Morrison (October 18, 1894 – January 18, 1955) was a professional baseball player. He was a right-handed pitcher for one season (1921) with the Pittsburgh Pirates. For his career, he recorded no decisions and a 0.00 earned run average, with 1 strikeout in 2/3 of an inning pitched.

He was born in Rockport, Indiana and died in Lexington, Kentucky at the age of 60.
