= Drew Rader =

American baseball player (1901–1975)

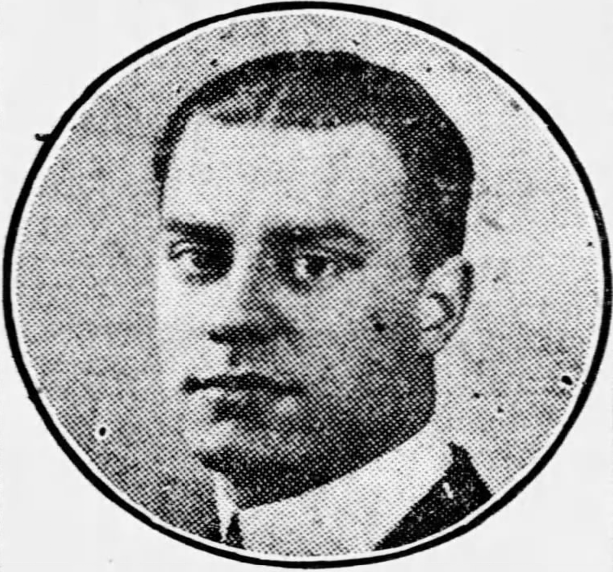
- Rader c. 1925
- Pitcher
- Born: April 14, 1901; Elmira, New York
- Died: June 5, 1975 (aged 74); Catskill, New York
- Batted: Right Threw: Left

MLB debut
- July 18, 1921, for the Pittsburgh Pirates

Last MLB appearance
- July 18, 1921, for the Pittsburgh Pirates

MLB statistics
- Games pitched: 1
- Innings pitched: 2.0
- Earned run average: 0.00
- Stats at Baseball Reference

Teams
- Pittsburgh Pirates (1921)

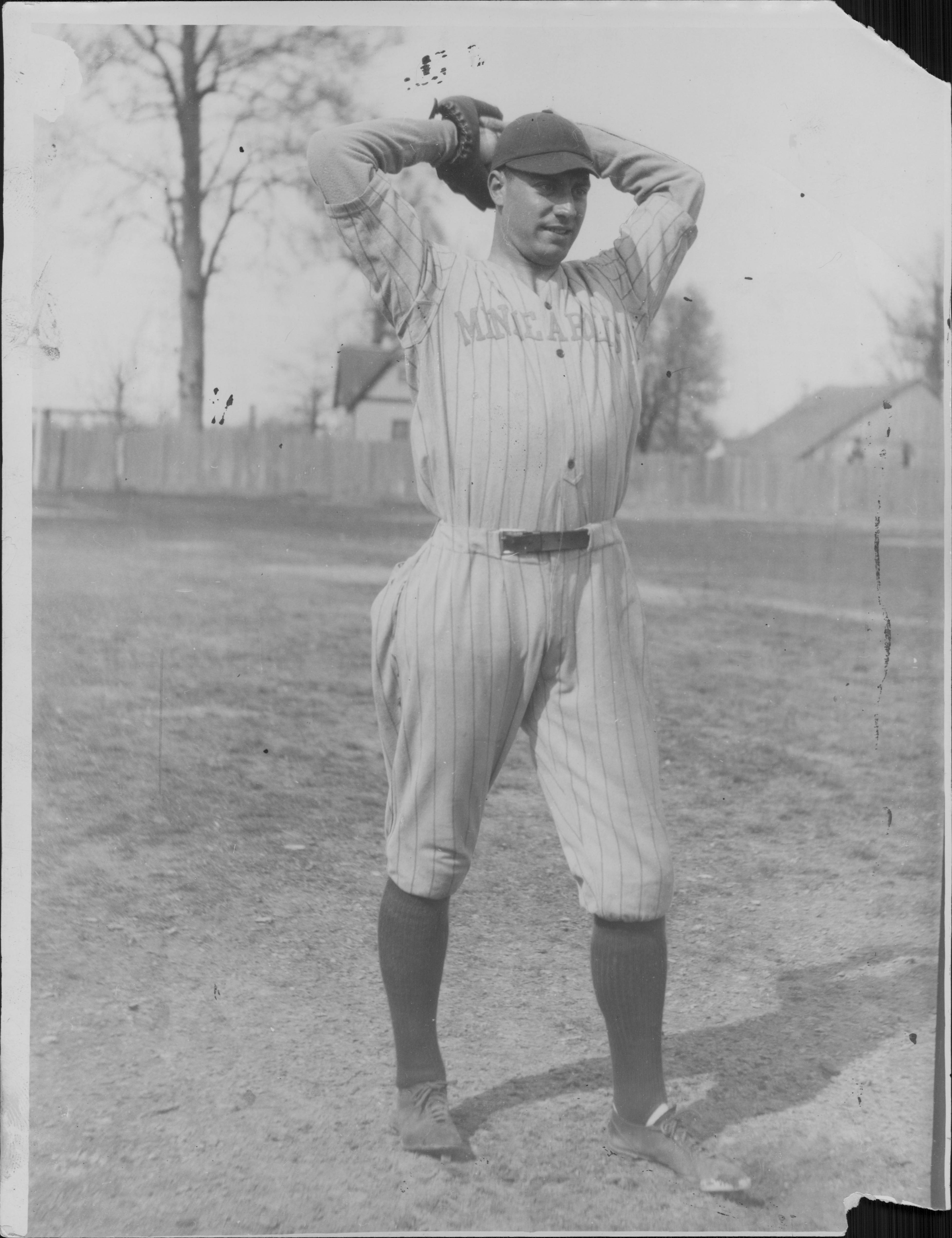
Rader with the Minneapolis Millers, 1920s

Drew Leon "Lefty" Rader (May 14, 1901 – June 5, 1975) was a Major League Baseball pitcher. Rader played for the Pittsburgh Pirates in 1921. In 1 career game, he had a 0–0 record, with a 0.00 ERA, pitching in 2 innings. He batted right-handed and threw left-handed.

Rader was born in Elmira, New York and died in Catskill, New York.
