= Moses Yellowhorse =

Native American baseball player (1898–1964)

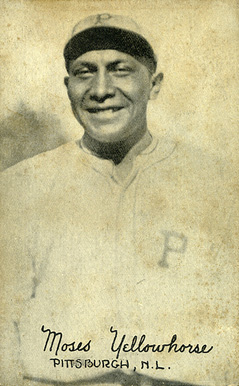
- Pitcher
- Born: January 28, 1898; Pawnee, Oklahoma, U.S.
- Died: April 10, 1964 (aged 66); Pawnee, Oklahoma, U.S.
- Batted: Right Threw: Right

MLB debut
- April 15, 1921, for the Pittsburgh Pirates

Last MLB appearance
- October 1, 1922, for the Pittsburgh Pirates

MLB statistics
- Win–loss record: 8–4
- Earned run average: 3.93
- Strikeouts: 43
- Stats at Baseball Reference

Teams
- Pittsburgh Pirates (1921–1922)

Moses J. Yellowhorse (Note: Surname appears in some sources as two words, Yellow Horse. The family today writes it YellowHorse) (January 28, 1898 – April 10, 1964) was a Native American professional baseball pitcher from Oklahoma. He played two seasons in Major League Baseball for the Pittsburgh Pirates, 1921 and 1922. Yellowhorse was Skidi Pawnee.

== Early life ==
Moses "Mose" J. Yellowhorse was born in Indian Territory (present-day Oklahoma) to Clara and Thomas Yellowhorse in January 28, 1898. His parents were Skidi Pawnee and had been forced to walk to Indian Territory from their Pawnee homelands in Nebraska. Moses hunted to help feed his family and rode in Pawnee Bill's Wild West Show with his father.

Yellowhorse was a full-blooded Native American. The Indian Agency mandated that he was ordered to attend an Indian boarding school. He went to the Pawnee Indian Boarding School, then Chilocco Indian Agricultural School, where Yellowhorse began his baseball career. In 1917, he performed at a high level for the school and compiled a win–loss record of 17–0.

== Professional baseball career ==
After Yellowhorse left Chilocco, he went to pitch for the Little Rock Travelers of the minor league Southern Association. In 1920, under the tutelage of Kid Elberfeld, he helped the team to its first championship.

In 1921, Yellowhorse joined the Pittsburgh Pirates. His major league debut was on April 15 in relief of Earl Hamilton. The Pirates won the game 3–1 over Eppa Rixey and the Cincinnati Reds. Later that year, he ruptured his arm and had to have surgery. His injury forced him to sit out two months. The next year, Yellowhorse injured his arm a second time. The injury was purportedly a result of a fall he took while drunk. Over his two-year stay with the Pirates, Yellowhorse was used primarily as a reliever and compiled a record of 8 wins and 4 losses.

While with the Pirates, Yellowhorse befriended Rabbit Maranville. The relationship had a profound impact on his life as Maranville introduced Yellowhorse to alcohol; he began to drink substantial amounts of liquor frequently. Later in life, Yellowhorse identified himself as an alcoholic.

Unable to pitch in the major leagues, either because of his behavior and/or his injuries, Yellowhorse went to play minor league baseball. In 1923, he was sent to play with the Sacramento Senators of the Pacific Coast League. The next year, he suffered another serious arm injury and Sacramento traded him to Fort Worth, Texas. Shortly thereafter, Fort Worth returned him to Sacramento. He spent two more years with Sacramento when, in January 1926, Sacramento sold Moses to Omaha. He pitched the final game of his professional career on May 1, 1926.

While Yellowhorse is believed by many historians to be the first full-blooded Native American to play major league baseball, there had been previous major league baseball players of Native American ancestry. These included Louis Sockalexis (Cleveland Spiders, 1897–1899), Charles Albert (Chief) Bender (primarily the Philadelphia Athletics, 1903–1917), and John (Chief) Meyers (primarily the New York Giants, 1909–1917).

== Alcoholism and later life ==
By 1923, news of Yellowhorse's drinking problems reached the Pawnee tribal members in Oklahoma. In addition to the physical problems he had as a result of the drinking, this created tension between Yellowhorse and the tribe. After he retired from baseball, he spent the next 18 years working jobs that did not provide him with much disposable income. His continued drinking remained a divider between him and the tribe.

1945 was an important year for Yellowhorse. For unknown reasons, he stopped drinking cold turkey, and was able to find steady work. His first job was with the Ponca City farm team, and his second job was with the Oklahoma State Highway Department. Yellowhorse also served as groundskeeper for the Ponca City ballclub in 1947 and coached an all-Indian baseball team. Eventually, his relationship with the tribe improved and he became an honored member; a sports field was named after him in Pawnee, Oklahoma. He was also able to remain sober for the remainder of his life. Yellowhorse died on April 10, 1964, at the age of 66 in Oklahoma.

== Dick Tracy and Yellow Pony ==
Like Yellowhorse, cartoonist Chester Gould was also born on the Pawnee Indian reservation. Gould used Yellowhorse in his Dick Tracy comic strip as the model for a character named Yellow Pony. Other than the name, the only real similarity between live model and comic strip character was a big, strong physique.

== Statistics ==
Season	W	L	G	IP	HR	BB	SO	HBP	ERA	WHIP
1921	5	3	10	48.1	1	13	19	0	2.98	1.200
1922	3	1	28	77.2	0	20	24	2	4.52	1.442
