= Walt Irwin =

American baseball player (1897–1976)

- Pinch hitter / Pinch runner
- Born: September 23, 1897; Henrietta, Pennsylvania
- Died: August 18, 1976 (aged 78); Spring Lake, Michigan
- Batted: Right Threw: Right

MLB debut
- April 24, 1921, for the St. Louis Cardinals

Last MLB appearance
- May 12, 1921, for the St. Louis Cardinals

MLB statistics
- Games: 4
- At bats: 1
- Runs: 1

Teams
- St. Louis Cardinals (1921)

Walter Kingsley Irwin (September 23, 1897 – August 18, 1976) was a Major League Baseball player. Irwin played for St. Louis Cardinals in 1921 as pinch runner and pinch hitter in 4 games.

Irvin was born in Henrietta, Pennsylvania, and died in Spring Lake, Michigan.
