= Ray Rohwer =

American baseball player (1895–1988)

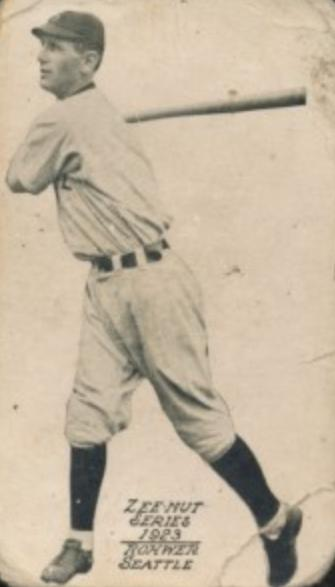
- Outfielder
- Born: June 5, 1895; Dixon, California, U.S.
- Died: January 24, 1988 (aged 92); Davis, California, U.S.
- Batted: Left Threw: Left

MLB debut
- April 13, 1921, for the Pittsburgh Pirates

Last MLB appearance
- September 1, 1922, for the Pittsburgh Pirates

MLB statistics
- Batting average: .284
- Home runs: 3
- Runs batted in: 28
- Stats at Baseball Reference

Teams
- Pittsburgh Pirates (1921–1922)

Ray Arthur Rohwer (April 5, 1895 – September 1, 1988) was an outfielder for the Pittsburgh Pirates. He spent parts of two seasons with the Pirates, playing in 83 games during the 1921–22 seasons. Rohwer came of an old Solano County family. He played college baseball at the University of California, where he joined Theta Xi, before serving in the Army during World War I.

In 83 games over two major league seasons, Rohwer posted a .284 batting average (48-for-169) with 25 runs, 3 home runs and 28 RBI.

After his playing for the Pirates, Rohwer spent nine seasons in the Pacific Coast League, playing for Seattle, Portland and Sacramento. He compiled a career .299 average and rapped out 1,402 hits, 287 doubles, 61 triples and 196 home runs during his time in the PCL, which ran from 1923 until 1931. In 1927, Rohwer once had six plate appearances in a game without an official at bat.

Rohwer's brother, Claude, also played baseball, getting into two games with the San Francisco Seals of the Pacific Coast League in 1920, then played the 1922 season with Charleston of the South Atlantic League, and 1923–24 seasons with Sacramento of the PCL.
