= Carter Elliott =

American baseball player (1893–1959)

- Shortstop
- Born: November 29, 1893; Atchison, Kansas, U.S.
- Died: May 21, 1959 (aged 65); Palm Springs, California, U.S.
- Batted: Left Threw: Right

MLB debut
- September 10, 1921, for the Chicago Cubs

Last MLB appearance
- September 28, 1921, for the Chicago Cubs

MLB statistics
- Games played: 12
- Batting average: .250
- Runs batted in: 0
- Stats at Baseball Reference

Teams
- Chicago Cubs (1921)

Carter Ward Elliott (November 29, 1893 – May 21, 1959) was an American shortstop in Major League Baseball. He played for the Chicago Cubs.
