= Jesse Barnes =

American baseball player (1892-1961)

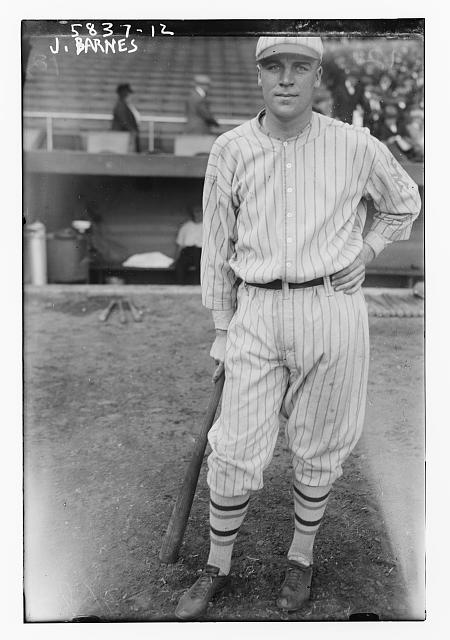
- Pitcher
- Born: August 26, 1892; Ontario, Nemaha County, Kansas, USA
- Died: September 9, 1961 (aged 69); Santa Rosa, New Mexico, U.S.
- Batted: Left Threw: Right

MLB debut
- July 30, 1915, for the Boston Braves

Last MLB appearance
- August 20, 1927, for the Brooklyn Robins

MLB statistics
- Win–loss record: 152–150
- Earned run average: 3.22
- Strikeouts: 653
- Stats at Baseball Reference

Teams
- Boston Braves (1915–1917); New York Giants (1918–1923); Boston Braves (1923–1925); Brooklyn Robins (1926–1927)

Career highlights and awards
- 2× World Series champion (1921, 1922); NL wins leader (1919); Pitched a no-hitter on May 7, 1922

Jesse Lawrence Barnes (August 26, 1892 – September 9, 1961) was an American pitcher in Major League Baseball.

Barnes began his major league career in 1914 with the Boston Braves. In 1917, he led the National League with 21 losses. On October 2, 1917, he became the only NL pitcher to walk twice in one inning.

In 1918, Barnes was traded to the New York Giants. He had three very good years with the Giants. On the last day of the 1919 season, Barnes won his National League-leading 25th victory, 6–1, over Lee Meadows and the Philadelphia Phillies at Polo Grounds. The game was played at a feverish pace and lasted a mere 51 minutes, a major league record that still stands as the shortest nine-inning game ever played.

In 1920 he had 20 wins, following with 15 wins in 1921 and two victories in the 1921 World Series against the New York Yankees. Then, on May 7, 1922, he hurled a no-hitter against the Phillies; Cy Williams was the only baserunner, who walked and was erased on a double play.

Barnes returned to the Braves in 1923, playing for them three years before joining the Brooklyn Robins during 1926 and 1927. For the second time, he led the league in losses (20) in 1924.

His younger brother, Virgil, also pitched in the majors, and both were teammates with the Giants from 1919 to 1923.

Barnes was a better than average hitting pitcher in his major league career, posting a .214 batting average (195-for-913) with 71 runs, 5 triples, 1 home run, 69 RBI, and 24 bases on balls. In four World Series appearances, he batted .308 (4-for-13) with three runs scored. Defensively, he was better than average, recording a .976 fielding percentage which was 17 points higher than the league average at his position.

The baseball author and analyst Bill James is also a distant relative of the brothers.

== See also ==
- List of Major League Baseball annual wins leaders
- List of Major League Baseball no-hitters

Preceded by Charlie Robertson	No-hitter pitcher May 7, 1922	Succeeded by Sad Sam Jones
