= Ollie Hanson =

American baseball player (1896–1951)

- Pitcher
- Born: January 19, 1896; Holbrook, Massachusetts, U.S.
- Died: August 19, 1951 (aged 55); Clifton, New Jersey, U.S.
- Batted: Right Threw: Right

MLB debut
- April 27, 1921, for the Chicago Cubs

Last MLB appearance
- May 5, 1921, for the Chicago Cubs

MLB statistics
- Win–loss record: 0–2
- Earned run average: 7.00
- Strikeouts: 2
- Stats at Baseball Reference

Teams
- Chicago Cubs (1921)

Earl Sylvester "Ollie" Hanson (January 19, 1896 – August 19, 1951) was an American Major League Baseball pitcher who played for the Chicago Cubs in 1921.
