= Walter Zink =

American baseball player

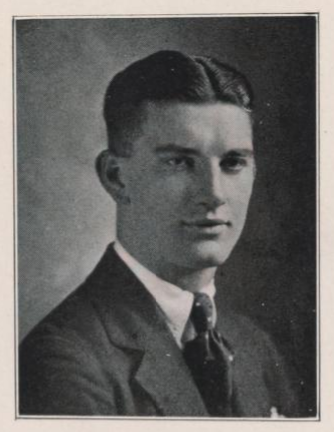
- Pitcher
- Born: January 21, 1898; Pittsfield, Massachusetts, U.S.
- Died: June 12, 1964 (aged 66); Quincy, Massachusetts, U.S.
- Batted: Right Threw: Right

MLB debut
- July 6, 1921, for the New York Giants

Last MLB appearance
- July 19, 1921, for the New York Giants

MLB statistics
- Win–loss record: 0-0
- Earned run average: 2.25
- Strikeouts: 1
- Stats at Baseball Reference

Teams
- New York Giants (1921)

Walter Noble Zink (November 21, 1898 – June 12, 1964) was an American professional baseball pitcher. He appeared in two games in Major League Baseball for the New York Giants in 1921. He also attended Amherst College. He batted and threw right-handed. He was 6'0", 165 pounds. He died on June 12, 1964, in Quincy, Massachusetts.
