= Johnny Mokan =

American baseball player (1895–1985)

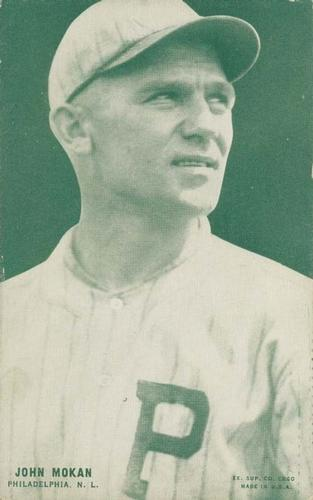
- Outfielder
- Born: September 23, 1895; Buffalo, New York, U.S.
- Died: February 10, 1985 (aged 89); Buffalo, New York, U.S.
- Batted: Right Threw: Right

MLB debut
- April 15, 1921, for the Pittsburgh Pirates

Last MLB appearance
- October 2, 1927, for the Philadelphia Phillies

MLB statistics
- Batting average: .291
- Home runs: 32
- Runs batted in: 273
- Stats at Baseball Reference

Teams
- Pittsburgh Pirates (1921–1922); Philadelphia Phillies (1922–1927)

John Leo Mokan (September 23, 1895 – February 10, 1985) was an American Major League Baseball outfielder. He batted and threw right-handed.

A native of Buffalo, New York, Mokan made his major league debut on April 15, 1921 at the age of 25. He spent seven seasons in the National League with the Pittsburgh Pirates (1921–22) and Philadelphia Phillies (1923–27).

Mokan was a .291 career hitter with 32 home runs and 273 RBI in 582 games. His most productive season came in 1923 when he posted career-highs in batting average (.313), home runs (10), runs (76) and doubles (23). He had another good season in 1926, hitting .303 with career-highs in RBI (62), hits (138), triples (5) and games played (135). Mokan played his final game on October 2, 1927.

He died in Buffalo, New York at age 89.
