= 1921 Philadelphia Phillies season =

Major League Baseball season

1921 Philadelphia Phillies
- League: National League
- Ballpark: Baker Bowl
- City: Philadelphia, Pennsylvania
- Owners: William F. Baker
- Managers: Bill Donovan, Kaiser Wilhelm

The following lists the events of the 1921 Philadelphia Phillies season.

== Offseason ==
In 1921, the Phillies held spring training in Gainesville, Florida at Fleming Field, the home field of the Florida Gators baseball team.

== Regular season ==
=== Mid-season arrests ===
On July 16, 1921, Phillies players Jimmy Smith, Cy Williams, Frank Bruggy, Goldie Rapp, and Cliff Lee were arrested while leaving the ballpark in Philadelphia. Smith was detained and charged with assault, however the other four were allowed to leave after talking to police. While driving away from the park, two pedestrians walked in front of Bruggy's car (which all the Phillies were riding in), and the Phillies allegedly yelled at the pair. This allegedly instigated an argument and Smith was charged with hitting one of the pedestrians several times.

=== Season standings ===
National League
Team	W	L	Pct.	GB	Home	Road
New York Giants	94	59	.614	—	53‍–‍26	41‍–‍33
Pittsburgh Pirates	90	63	.588	4	45‍–‍31	45‍–‍32
St. Louis Cardinals	87	66	.569	7	48‍–‍29	39‍–‍37
Boston Braves	79	74	.516	15	42‍–‍32	37‍–‍42
Brooklyn Robins	77	75	.507	16½	41‍–‍37	36‍–‍38
Cincinnati Reds	70	83	.458	24	40‍–‍36	30‍–‍47
Chicago Cubs	64	89	.418	30	32‍–‍44	32‍–‍45
Philadelphia Phillies	51	103	.331	43½	29‍–‍47	22‍–‍56

=== Record vs. opponents ===
1921 National League record Sources:
Team	BSN	BRO	CHC	CIN	NYG	PHI	PIT	STL
Boston	—	11–11	14–8	13–9	8–13	14–8	9–13	10–12
Brooklyn	11–11	—	10–11	10–11	12–10	16–6	10–12	8–14
Chicago	8–14	11–10	—	13–9	8–14	11–11	5–17	8–14
Cincinnati	9–13	11–10	9–13	—	8–14	13–9	8–14	12–10
New York	13–8	10–12	14–8	14–8	—	16–6	16–6	11–11
Philadelphia	8–14	6–16	11–11	9–13	6–16	—	4–18	7–15
Pittsburgh	13–9	12–10	17–5	14–8	6–16	18–4	—	10–11–1
St. Louis	12–10	14–8	14–8	10–12	11–11	15–7	11–10–1	—

=== Roster ===
1921 Philadelphia Phillies
Roster
Pitchers: Stan Baumgartner; Petie Behan; Huck Betts; Red Causey; Bill Hubbell; Jimmie Keenan; Lee Meadows; Jimmy Ring; Duke Sedgwick; George Smith; Lefty Weinert; Kaiser Wilhelm; Jesse Winters	Catchers: Frank Bruggy; Butch Henline; John Peters; Mack Wheat; Infielders: Ed Konetchy; Cliff Lee; Dots Miller; Ralph Miller; John Monroe; Frank Parkinson; Don Rader; Goldie Rapp; Johnny Rawlings; Lance Richbourg; Jimmy Smith; Russ Wrightstone	Outfielders: Lee King; Bevo LeBourveau; Irish Meusel; Greasy Neale; Casey Stengel; Curt Walker; Cy Williams	Manager: Bill Donovan; Kaiser Wilhelm; Coaches: Kaiser Wilhelm

== Player stats ==
=== Batting ===
==== Starters by position ====
Note: Pos = Position; G = Games played; AB = At bats; H = Hits; Avg. = Batting average; HR = Home runs; RBI = Runs batted in

Pos	Player	G	AB	H	Avg.	HR	RBI
C	Frank Bruggy	96	277	86	.310	5	28
1B	Ed Konetchy	72	268	86	.321	8	59
2B	Jimmy Smith	67	247	57	.231	4	22
3B	Russ Wrightstone	109	372	110	.296	9	51
SS	Frank Parkinson	108	391	99	.253	5	32
OF	Bevo LeBourveau	93	281	83	.295	6	35
OF	Irish Meusel	84	343	121	.353	12	51
OF	Cy Williams	146	562	180	.320	18	75

==== Other batters ====
Note: G = Games played; AB = At bats; H = Hits; Avg. = Batting average; HR = Home runs; RBI = Runs batted in

Player	G	AB	H	Avg.	HR	RBI
Dots Miller	84	320	95	.297	0	23
Cliff Lee	88	286	88	.308	4	29
Johnny Rawlings	60	254	74	.291	1	16
Lee King	64	216	58	.269	4	32
Ralph Miller	57	204	62	.304	3	26
Goldie Rapp	52	202	56	.277	1	10
John Peters	55	155	45	.290	3	23
John Monroe	41	133	38	.286	1	8
Butch Henline	33	111	34	.306	0	8
Curt Walker	21	77	26	.338	0	8
Casey Stengel	24	59	18	.305	0	4
Greasy Neale	22	57	12	.211	0	1
Don Rader	9	32	9	.281	0	3
Mack Wheat	10	27	5	.185	0	4
Lance Richbourg	10	5	1	.200	0	0

=== Pitching ===
==== Starting pitchers ====
Note: G = Games pitched; IP = Innings pitched; W = Wins; L = Losses; ERA = Earned run average; SO = Strikeouts

Player	G	IP	W	L	ERA	SO
Jimmy Ring	34	246.0	10	19	4.24	88
George Smith	39	221.1	4	20	4.76	45
Bill Hubbell	36	220.1	9	16	4.33	43
Lee Meadows	28	194.1	11	16	4.31	52
Jesse Winters	18	114.0	5	10	3.63	22
Red Causey	7	50.2	3	3	2.84	8
Petie Behan	2	10.2	0	1	5.91	3

==== Other pitchers ====
Note: G = Games pitched; IP = Innings pitched; W = Wins; L = Losses; ERA = Earned run average; SO = Strikeouts

Player	G	IP	W	L	ERA	SO
Duke Sedgwick	16	71.1	1	3	4.92	21
Stan Baumgartner	22	66.2	3	6	7.02	13

==== Relief pitchers ====
Note: G = Games pitched; W = Wins; L = Losses; SV = Saves; ERA = Earned run average; SO = Strikeouts

Player	G	W	L	SV	ERA	SO
Huck Betts	32	3	7	4	4.47	28
Jimmie Keenan	15	1	2	0	6.68	7
Lefty Weinert	8	1	0	0	1.46	2
Kaiser Wilhelm	4	0	0	0	3.38	1
