= 1923 Boston Braves season =

1923 Boston Braves
- League: National League
- Ballpark: Braves Field
- City: Boston, Massachusetts
- Record: 54–100 (.351)
- League place: 7th
- Owners: Emil Fuchs, Christy Mathewson
- Managers: Fred Mitchell

The 1923 Boston Braves season was the 53rd season of the franchise.

== Offseason ==
- October 15, 1922: Gus Felix was drafted by the Braves from the Shreveport Gassers (Texas) in the 1922 rule 5 draft.

== Regular season ==
- October 6, 1923: Ernie Padgett of the Braves executed an unassisted triple play. He caught a line drive, touched second base, and tagged the runner coming from first base. Padgett played just four games for the Braves all season, but would become the Braves' regular third baseman in 1924.

=== Season standings ===
National League
Team	W	L	Pct.	GB	Home	Road
New York Giants	95	58	.621	—	47‍–‍30	48‍–‍28
Cincinnati Reds	91	63	.591	4½	46‍–‍32	45‍–‍31
Pittsburgh Pirates	87	67	.565	8½	47‍–‍30	40‍–‍37
Chicago Cubs	83	71	.539	12½	46‍–‍31	37‍–‍40
St. Louis Cardinals	79	74	.516	16	42‍–‍35	37‍–‍39
Brooklyn Robins	76	78	.494	19½	37‍–‍40	39‍–‍38
Boston Braves	54	100	.351	41½	22‍–‍55	32‍–‍45
Philadelphia Phillies	50	104	.325	45½	20‍–‍55	30‍–‍49

=== Record vs. opponents ===
1923 National League record Sources:
Team	BSN	BRO	CHC	CIN	NYG	PHI	PIT	STL
Boston	—	8–14	6–16	7–15	6–16	13–9	5–17	9–13–1
Brooklyn	14–8	—	10–12	8–14	11–11	12–10–1	11–11	10–12
Chicago	16–6	12–10	—	9–13	10–12	13–9	11–11	12–10
Cincinnati	15–7	14–8	13–9	—	12–10	19–3	8–14	10–12
New York	16–6	11–11	12–10	10–12	—	19–3	13–9	14–7
Philadelphia	9–13	10–12–1	9–13	3–19	3–19	—	9–13	7–15
Pittsburgh	17–5	11–11	11–11	14–8	9–13	13–9	—	12–10
St. Louis	13–9–1	12–10	10–12	12–10	7–14	15–7	10–12	—

=== Roster ===
1923 Boston Braves
Roster
Pitchers: Jesse Barnes; Joe Batchelder; Larry Benton; Johnny Cooney; Dana Fillingim; Joe Genewich; Rube Marquard; Tim McNamara; Frank Miller; Joe Oeschger; Dick Rudolph; Mule Watson	Catchers: Dee Cousineau; Frank Gibson; Hank Gowdy; Mickey O'Neil; Earl Smith; Infielders: Tony Boeckel; Jocko Conlon; Hod Ford; Al Hermann; Larry Kopf; Stuffy McInnis; Ernie Padgett; Bob Smith	Outfielders: Bill Bagwell; Walton Cruise; Bob Emmerich; Gus Felix; Al Nixon; Ray Powell; Billy Southworth; Other batters: Snake Henry	Manager: Fred Mitchell

== Player stats ==
=== Batting ===
==== Starters by position ====
Note: Pos = Position; G = Games played; AB = At bats; H = Hits; Avg. = Batting average; HR = Home runs; RBI = Runs batted in

Pos	Player	G	AB	H	Avg.	HR	RBI
C	Mickey O'Neil	96	306	65	.212	0	20
1B	Stuffy McInnis	154	607	191	.315	2	95
2B	Hod Ford	111	380	103	.271	2	50
SS	Bob Smith	115	375	94	.251	0	40
3B	Tony Boeckel	148	568	169	.298	7	79
OF	Billy Southworth	153	611	195	.319	6	78
OF	Gus Felix	139	506	138	.273	6	44
OF	Ray Powell	97	338	102	.302	4	38

==== Other batters ====
Note: G = Games played; AB = At bats; H = Hits; Avg. = Batting average; HR = Home runs; RBI = Runs batted in

Player	G	AB	H	Avg.	HR	RBI
Al Nixon	88	321	88	.274	0	19
Earl Smith	72	191	55	.288	3	19
Jocko Conlon	59	147	32	.218	0	17
Larry Kopf	39	138	38	.275	0	10
Bill Bagwell	56	93	27	.290	2	10
Al Hermann	31	93	22	.237	0	11
Frank Gibson	41	50	15	.300	0	5
Hank Gowdy	23	48	6	.125	0	5
Walton Cruise	21	38	8	.211	0	0
Bob Emmerich	13	24	2	.083	0	0
Ernie Padgett	4	11	2	.182	0	0
Snake Henry	11	9	1	.111	0	2
Dee Cousineau	1	2	2	1.000	0	2

=== Pitching ===
==== Starting pitchers ====
Note: G = Games pitched; IP = Innings pitched; W = Wins; L = Losses; ERA = Earned run average; SO = Strikeouts

Player	G	IP	W	L	ERA	SO
Rube Marquard	38	239.0	11	14	3.73	78
Jesse Barnes	31	195.1	10	14	2.76	41
Frank Miller	8	39.1	0	3	4.58	6
Dick Rudolph	4	19.1	1	2	3.72	3

==== Other pitchers ====
Note: G = Games pitched; IP = Innings pitched; W = Wins; L = Losses; ERA = Earned run average; SO = Strikeouts

Player	G	IP	W	L	ERA	SO
Joe Genewich	43	227.1	13	14	3.72	54
Joe Oeschger	44	166.1	5	15	5.68	33
Tim McNamara	32	139.1	3	13	4.91	32
Larry Benton	35	128.0	5	9	4.99	42
Dana Fillingim	35	100.1	1	9	5.20	27
Johnny Cooney	23	98.0	3	5	3.31	23
Mule Watson	11	31.1	1	2	5.17	10
Joe Batchelder	4	9.0	1	0	7.00	2
