= Al Hermann =

American baseball player (1899-1980)

- Second baseman / Third baseman
- Born: March 28, 1899; Milltown, New Jersey
- Died: August 20, 1980 (aged 81); Lewes, Delaware
- Batted: Right Threw: Right

MLB debut
- July 13, 1923, for the Boston Braves

Last MLB appearance
- April 20, 1924, for the Boston Braves

MLB statistics
- Batting average: .234
- Home runs: 0
- Runs batted in: 11
- Stats at Baseball Reference

Teams
- Boston Braves (1923–1924)

Albert Bartel "Ab" Hermann (March 28, 1899 – August 20, 1980) was a Major League Baseball infielder. He played two seasons with the Boston Braves from 1923 to 1924. Later in life, he was active in Republican Party politics.

== Baseball career ==
Hermann graduated from New Brunswick High School in 1919 and attended Colgate University where he played for the school's baseball, basketball and football teams. As a baseball player, he reportedly had a .472 batting average and, in 1921, was the highest-scoring guard in college basketball. He graduated from Colgate in June 1923, after which it was reported he would spend the summer in Maine before reporting to Suffield Academy in Connecticut where he would serve as the athletic director.

Within days, however, Christy Mathewson, president of the Boston Braves, announced that Hermann had signed with the club. He was in uniform with the team at Braves Field by June 28. He nearly made his debut on July 9 when third baseman Tony Boeckel was ejected for kicking dirt on home plate umpire Ernie Quigley. Hermann was sent out to third base to warm up before the next inning but manager Fred Mitchell chose instead to substitute Gus Felix. Hermann made his debut a few days later on July 11 against the St. Louis Cardinals in Boston. He entered the game as a pinch hitter for Boeckel in the seventh inning and was struck out by Bill Sherdel. He recorded his first two hits in a game at Ebbets Field on July 22, both singles against Dutch Henry of the Brooklyn Dodgers. In the same game, he also recorded his first two runs batted in and his first stolen base. Hermann stayed with the Braves for the remainder of the season, accumulating a .237/.237/.280 slash line. Within eight days of the end of the 1923 season, Hermann was reportedly on the sidelines coaching the Suffield football team in its season opener against the freshman team of Tufts University.

Hermann left Suffield in early March 1924 to join the Braves in St. Petersburg, Florida for spring training. He was one of several young infielders competing to fill the void left by the offseason death of Tony Boeckel. He made his season debut on April 20, 1924 at the Polo Grounds against the New York Giants. In a one-run game with two runners on base in the ninth inning, the Braves inserted Earl Smith as a pinch hitter for Mickey O'Neil against Walt Huntzinger. However, when the Giants countered by substituting Art Nehf to face Smith, the Braves swapped out Smith in favor of Hermann in order to regain the platoon advantage. Nehf struck out Hermann and the following batter and the Braves lost. This would be Hermann's final game in the major leagues. Fellow 25-year-old, second-year infielder Ernie Padgett wound up filling the vacancy at third base.

Within days of his lone appearance of the 1924 Major League season, Hermann was farmed out to the New Haven Profs of the Eastern League. Hermann reportedly found great success in his brief time in New Haven. In less than a month, the Braves had him moved to the Eastern League's Worcester club where they could watch him more closely. During the 1924–1925 offseason, the Braves traded Hermann to the Albany Senators of the Eastern League, for whom Hermann initially refused to play. He wanted to be given the opportunity to play in a classification higher than Class A because, if he found he could not succeed at a higher level, he would quit baseball and begin a career using his college education instead. By that April, however, he left his coaching job at Suffield to end his holdout and join the team and would continue to play for Class A teams for the next several years. In 1929, he played for the Wichita Falls Spudders and, according to a columnist for the Wichita Falls Times, would "be remembered for a long, long time as the worst third baseman in the history of the club." After the season, he was sold to a club in the lesser New York–Penn League. He split the 1930 season, his last in minor league baseball, between Elmira, New York and Allentown, Pennsylvania.

== Political career ==
During his time playing and living in Albany, Hermann became affiliated with a branch of the Berkshire Life Insurance Company and began studying law. Upon moving back to New Jersey to attend New Jersey Law School, he encountered Harold G. Hoffman, his former youth baseball manager who was then director of the New Jersey Motor Vehicle Commission. Hermann credited Hoffman with recruiting him into politics.

In 1931, he was elected president of the local Republican club in Milltown, New Jersey, where his brother, Carl, was president of the local Democratic club. In 1933, he managed the winning campaign of the mayor of Milltown and was named the chairman of New Jersey's chapter of the Young Republicans. After Hermann's mentor, Harold G. Hoffman, was elected Governor of New Jersey, he named Hermann his executive secretary. He was also appointed clerk of New Jersey's Court of Pardons and became the youngest person ever to serve in that role. In May 1936, he won the Republican primary for New Jersey's 3rd congressional district and, in the same month, announced the sale of the Milltown bakery which had been in his family for 40 years. He ultimately lost the general election to William H. Sutphin.

He subsequently worked on the campaign of state senator Lester H. Clee and, in 1938, was hired as an aide to W. Warren Barbour, United States Senator from New Jersey. He subsequently ran Barbour's successful campaign for the 1938 United States Senate special election in New Jersey. After Barbour's death, he ran H. Alexander Smith's successful campaign for the 1944 United States Senate special election in New Jersey and was hired as an aide to Smith. In 1949, Guy Gabrielson named Hermann Executive Director of the Republican National Committee (RNC). He was also appointed as campaign secretary for Alfred E. Driscoll's successful campaign for the 1949 New Jersey gubernatorial election. In 1953, he ran the unsuccessful campaign of Paul L. Troast for the 1953 New Jersey gubernatorial election. He continued to serve with the RNC under 13 different chairmen. In 1960, the Executive Director position was abolished and he was named the campaign director of the RNC.

=== Electoral history ===
New Jersey's 3rd congressional district election, 1936
Party	Candidate	Votes	%
Democratic	William H. Sutphin (incumbent)	68,189	50.61
Republican	Albert B. Hermann	64,237	47.68
Townsend	Elizabeth Halleck	2,176	1.62
Communist	Willie Lee Johnson	132	0.10
Total votes		134,734	100.00
Democratic hold			

== Personal life ==
Hermann was of English, Irish and German descent. Hermann was married on July 4, 1937 in Oneonta, New York to Sylvia Bernstein of Newark, New Jersey. They had met in 1934 through their work with Governor Hoffman. Hermann's brother, Fred J. Hermann, was mayor of North Brunswick, New Jersey in the 1960s.

After he began working in the United States Senate, he and his family began living in Bethesda, Maryland. Hermann was a friend of Hale Boggs, with whom he shared an adjoining yard in Bethesda. Hermann's daughter was U.S. representative Jo Ann Emerson. He also had an older daughter named Ellen. Hermann suffered a mild stroke in 1979 but maintained that he would never retire from politics. He sat out the 1980 Republican National Convention and died a month later on August 20, 1980 in Lewes, Delaware while vacationing.
