= 1923 Cincinnati Reds season =

1923 Cincinnati Reds
- League: National League
- Ballpark: Redland Field
- City: Cincinnati, Ohio
- Owners: Garry Herrmann
- Managers: Pat Moran

The 1923 Cincinnati Reds season was a season in American baseball. The team finished second in the National League with a record of 91–63, 4½ games behind the New York Giants.

== Off-season ==
Following a successful 1922 season, in which the Reds finished in second place in the National League with an 86-68 record, seven games behind the pennant winning New York Giants, the Reds had a very quiet off-season.

The team did not make any major transactions, as Cincinnati would return in the 1923 season with the same lineup, hoping to contend for the National League pennant.

== Regular season ==
Cincinnati had a very disappointing start to the season, as by Memorial Day after a 5-4 extra innings loss to the St. Louis Cardinals, the team had a 14-20 record, sitting in sixth place in the National League, 12.5 games behind the first place New York Giants.

The Reds did turn their season around, posting a record of 18-3 in their next 21 games, bringing them to an overall record of 32-23, and into second place, four games behind the New York Giants. Cincinnati would continue to stay red hot, eventually cutting the Giants lead down to two games, as following an 11-4 win over the Brooklyn Robins on July 20, the Reds had a 52-31 record.

In early August, the Reds were swept in a five-game series against the Giants, dropping to third place, eight games behind New York, as their record dropped to 61-43. The club did rebound, and by the beginning of September, Cincinnati once again cut the Giants lead down to a slim three games.

The club though could not catch the Giants, and finished the 1923 season with a very solid 91-63 record, finishing in second place for the second consecutive season, four and a half games behind New York. Their 91 wins was the highest total for the Reds since winning 96 games in 1919, and the club set a team record for highest attendance in a season, drawing 575,063 fans.

Outfielder Edd Roush had another superb season for Cincinnati, batting .351 with six home runs and 88 RBI in 138 games. His 41 doubles led the National League in that category. Outfielder Pat Duncan hit .327 with seven home runs and 83 RBI in 147 games, while catcher Bubbles Hargrave hit .333 with 10 home runs and 78 RBI in 118 games.

Pitcher Dolf Luque emerged as the staff ace, as he finished the year leading the National League with 27 wins, a 1.93 ERA and six shutouts. Luque also pitched 322 innings, striking out 151 batters in 41 games. Eppa Rixey had another very solid season, going 20-15 with a 2.80 ERA in 42 games, pitching 309 innings. Pete Donohue was the Reds third 20-game winner, as he finished the season 21-15 with a 3.38 ERA in 42 games.

=== Season standings ===
National League
| Team | W | L | Pct. | GB | Home | Road |
|---|---|---|---|---|---|---|
| New York Giants | 95 | 58 | .621 | — | 47‍–‍30 | 48‍–‍28 |
| Cincinnati Reds | 91 | 63 | .591 | 4½ | 46‍–‍32 | 45‍–‍31 |
| Pittsburgh Pirates | 87 | 67 | .565 | 8½ | 47‍–‍30 | 40‍–‍37 |
| Chicago Cubs | 83 | 71 | .539 | 12½ | 46‍–‍31 | 37‍–‍40 |
| St. Louis Cardinals | 79 | 74 | .516 | 16 | 42‍–‍35 | 37‍–‍39 |
| Brooklyn Robins | 76 | 78 | .494 | 19½ | 37‍–‍40 | 39‍–‍38 |
| Boston Braves | 54 | 100 | .351 | 41½ | 22‍–‍55 | 32‍–‍45 |
| Philadelphia Phillies | 50 | 104 | .325 | 45½ | 20‍–‍55 | 30‍–‍49 |

=== Record vs. opponents ===
1923 National League record Sources:
| Team | BSN | BRO | CHC | CIN | NYG | PHI | PIT | STL |
|---|---|---|---|---|---|---|---|---|
| Boston | — | 8–14 | 6–16 | 7–15 | 6–16 | 13–9 | 5–17 | 9–13–1 |
| Brooklyn | 14–8 | — | 10–12 | 8–14 | 11–11 | 12–10–1 | 11–11 | 10–12 |
| Chicago | 16–6 | 12–10 | — | 9–13 | 10–12 | 13–9 | 11–11 | 12–10 |
| Cincinnati | 15–7 | 14–8 | 13–9 | — | 12–10 | 19–3 | 8–14 | 10–12 |
| New York | 16–6 | 11–11 | 12–10 | 10–12 | — | 19–3 | 13–9 | 14–7 |
| Philadelphia | 9–13 | 10–12–1 | 9–13 | 3–19 | 3–19 | — | 9–13 | 7–15 |
| Pittsburgh | 17–5 | 11–11 | 11–11 | 14–8 | 9–13 | 13–9 | — | 12–10 |
| St. Louis | 13–9–1 | 12–10 | 10–12 | 12–10 | 7–14 | 15–7 | 10–12 | — |

=== Roster ===
1923 Cincinnati Reds
Roster
| Pitchers: George Abrams; Rube Benton; Johnny Couch; Pete Donohue; Haddie Gill; Bill Harris; Cactus Keck; Dolf Luque; Herb McQuaid; Eppa Rixey; Karl Schnell | Catchers: Bubbles Hargrave; Gus Sandberg; Ivey Wingo; Infielders: Sam Bohne; Rube Bressler; Ike Caveney; Jake Daubert; Lew Fonseca; Boob Fowler; Wally Kimmick; Babe Pinelli | Outfielders: George Burns; Pat Duncan; George Harper; Eddie Pick; Edd Roush; Other batters: Ed Hock; Les Mann | Manager: Pat Moran |

== Player stats ==
=== Batting ===
==== Starters by position ====
Note: Pos = Position; G = Games played; AB = At bats; H = Hits; Avg. = Batting average; HR = Home runs; RBI = Runs batted in

| Pos | Player | G | AB | H | Avg. | HR | RBI |
|---|---|---|---|---|---|---|---|
| C | Bubbles Hargrave | 118 | 378 | 126 | .333 | 10 | 78 |
| 1B | Jake Daubert | 125 | 500 | 146 | .292 | 2 | 54 |
| 2B | Sam Bohne | 139 | 539 | 136 | .252 | 3 | 47 |
| SS | Ike Caveney | 138 | 488 | 135 | .277 | 4 | 63 |
| 3B | Babe Pinelli | 117 | 423 | 117 | .277 | 0 | 51 |
| OF | George Burns | 154 | 614 | 168 | .274 | 3 | 45 |
| OF | Pat Duncan | 147 | 566 | 185 | .327 | 7 | 83 |
| OF | Edd Roush | 138 | 527 | 185 | .351 | 6 | 88 |

==== Other batters ====
Note: G = Games played; AB = At bats; H = Hits; Avg. = Batting average; HR = Home runs; RBI = Runs batted in

| Player | G | AB | H | Avg. | HR | RBI |
|---|---|---|---|---|---|---|
| Lew Fonseca | 65 | 237 | 66 | .278 | 3 | 28 |
| Ivey Wingo | 61 | 171 | 45 | .263 | 1 | 24 |
| Rube Bressler | 54 | 119 | 33 | .277 | 0 | 18 |
| George Harper | 61 | 125 | 32 | .256 | 3 | 16 |
| Wally Kimmick | 29 | 80 | 18 | .225 | 0 | 6 |
| Gus Sandberg | 7 | 17 | 3 | .176 | 0 | 1 |
| Eddie Pick | 9 | 8 | 3 | .375 | 0 | 2 |
| Les Mann | 8 | 1 | 0 | .000 | 0 | 0 |
| Ed Hock | 2 | 0 | 0 | ---- | 0 | 0 |

=== Pitching ===
==== Starting pitchers ====
Note: G = Games pitched; IP = Innings pitched; W = Wins; L = Losses; ERA = Earned run average; SO = Strikeouts

| Player | G | IP | W | L | ERA | SO |
|---|---|---|---|---|---|---|
| Dolf Luque | 41 | 322.0 | 27 | 8 | 1.93 | 151 |
| Eppa Rixey | 42 | 309.0 | 20 | 15 | 2.80 | 97 |
| Pete Donohue | 42 | 274.1 | 21 | 15 | 3.38 | 84 |
| Rube Benton | 33 | 219.0 | 14 | 10 | 3.66 | 59 |

==== Other pitchers ====
Note: G = Games pitched; IP = Innings pitched; W = Wins; L = Losses; ERA = Earned run average; SO = Strikeouts

| Player | G | IP | W | L | ERA | SO |
|---|---|---|---|---|---|---|
| Cactus Keck | 35 | 87.0 | 3 | 6 | 3.72 | 16 |
| Bill Harris | 22 | 69.2 | 3 | 2 | 5.17 | 18 |
| Johnny Couch | 19 | 69.1 | 2 | 7 | 5.97 | 14 |

==== Relief pitchers ====
Note: G = Games pitched; W = Wins; L = Losses; SV = Saves; ERA = Earned run average; SO = Strikeouts

| Player | G | W | L | SV | ERA | SO |
|---|---|---|---|---|---|---|
| Herb McQuaid | 12 | 1 | 0 | 0 | 2.36 | 9 |
| George Abrams | 3 | 0 | 0 | 0 | 9.64 | 1 |
| Karl Schnell | 1 | 0 | 0 | 0 | 36.00 | 0 |
| Haddie Gill | 1 | 0 | 0 | 0 | 0.00 | 1 |
