= 1923 St. Louis Cardinals season =

Major League Baseball season

1923 St. Louis Cardinals
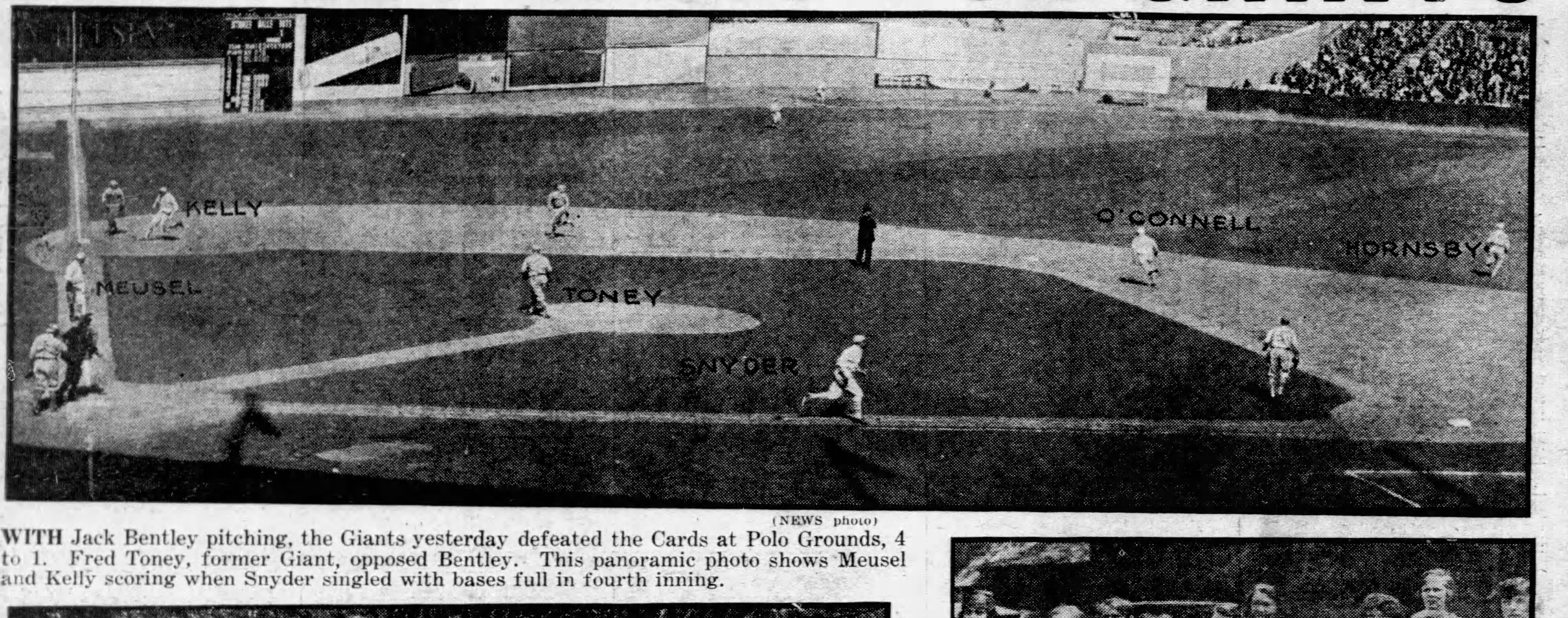
- The New York Giants playing against the St. Louis Cardinals on May 23, 1923 at The Polo Grounds
- League: National League
- Ballpark: Sportsman's Park
- City: St. Louis, Missouri
- Record: 79–74 (.516)
- League place: 5th
- Owners: Sam Breadon
- Managers: Branch Rickey

The 1923 St. Louis Cardinals season was the team's 42nd season in St. Louis, Missouri and its 32nd season in the National League. The Cardinals went 79–74 during the season and finished fifth in the National League. This is the first season that the Cardinals wore numbers on their uniforms but only on the left sleeve and only for home games. By the next season the numbers were abandoned and wouldn't return, this time permanently, until 1932.

== Regular season ==
Rogers Hornsby set a major league record of 13 consecutive games with two or more base hits, accomplished July 5 through July 18, 1923.

=== Season standings ===
National League
Team	W	L	Pct.	GB	Home	Road
New York Giants	95	58	.621	—	47‍–‍30	48‍–‍28
Cincinnati Reds	91	63	.591	4½	46‍–‍32	45‍–‍31
Pittsburgh Pirates	87	67	.565	8½	47‍–‍30	40‍–‍37
Chicago Cubs	83	71	.539	12½	46‍–‍31	37‍–‍40
St. Louis Cardinals	79	74	.516	16	42‍–‍35	37‍–‍39
Brooklyn Robins	76	78	.494	19½	37‍–‍40	39‍–‍38
Boston Braves	54	100	.351	41½	22‍–‍55	32‍–‍45
Philadelphia Phillies	50	104	.325	45½	20‍–‍55	30‍–‍49

=== Record vs. opponents ===
1923 National League record Sources:
Team	BSN	BRO	CHC	CIN	NYG	PHI	PIT	STL
Boston	—	8–14	6–16	7–15	6–16	13–9	5–17	9–13–1
Brooklyn	14–8	—	10–12	8–14	11–11	12–10–1	11–11	10–12
Chicago	16–6	12–10	—	9–13	10–12	13–9	11–11	12–10
Cincinnati	15–7	14–8	13–9	—	12–10	19–3	8–14	10–12
New York	16–6	11–11	12–10	10–12	—	19–3	13–9	14–7
Philadelphia	9–13	10–12–1	9–13	3–19	3–19	—	9–13	7–15
Pittsburgh	17–5	11–11	11–11	14–8	9–13	13–9	—	12–10
St. Louis	13–9–1	12–10	10–12	12–10	7–14	15–7	10–12	—

=== Roster ===
1923 St. Louis Cardinals
Roster
Pitchers: 20 Clyde Barfoot; 22 Bill Doak; 49 Jesse Haines; 23 Lou North; Bill Pertica; 17 Jeff Pfeffer; Epp Sell; 31 Bill Sherdel; 8 Johnny Stuart; 18 Fred Toney; Fred Wigington	Catchers: 16 Eddie Ainsmith; 14 Verne Clemons; George Kopshaw; 15 Harry McCurdy; Charlie Niebergall; Infielders: Les Bell; 4 Jim Bottomley; Jake Flowers; Howard Freigau; 6 Rogers Hornsby; Jimmy Hudgens; 9 Doc Lavan; 5 Milt Stock; 12 Specs Toporcer; Speed Walker	Outfielders: Ray Blades; Taylor Douthit; 21 Eddie Dyer; 3 Max Flack; 11 Les Mann; 7 Heinie Mueller; 10 Hy Myers; 61 Joe Schultz; 1 Jack Smith; Tige Stone; Other batters: 24 Burt Shotton	Manager: Branch Rickey; Coaches: 24 Burt Shotton; Joe Sugden

== Player stats ==
= Indicates team leader

= Indicates league leader

=== Batting ===
==== Starters by position ====
Note: Pos = Position; G = Games played; AB = At bats; H = Hits; Avg. = Batting average; HR = Home runs; RBI = Runs batted in

Pos	Player	G	AB	H	Avg.	HR	RBI
C	Eddie Ainsmith	82	263	56	.213	3	34
1B	Jim Bottomley	134	523	194	.371	8	94
2B	Rogers Hornsby	107	424	163	.384	17	83
SS	Howard Freigau	113	358	94	.263	1	35
3B	Milt Stock	151	603	174	.289	2	96
OF	Hy Myers	96	330	99	.300	2	48
OF	Jack Smith	124	407	126	.310	5	41
OF	Max Flack	128	505	147	.291	3	28

==== Other batters ====
Note: G = Games played; AB = At bats; H = Hits; Avg. = Batting average; HR = Home runs; RBI = Runs batted in

Player	G	AB	H	Avg.	HR	RBI
Ray Blades	98	317	78	.246	5	44
Specs Toporcer	97	303	77	.254	3	35
Heinie Mueller	78	265	91	.343	5	41
Harry McCurdy	67	185	49	.265	0	15
Verne Clemons	57	130	37	.285	0	13
Doc Lavan	50	111	22	.198	1	12
Leslie Mann	38	89	33	.371	5	11
Les Bell	15	51	19	.373	0	9
Eddie Dyer	35	45	12	.267	2	5
Jake Flowers	13	32	3	.094	0	2
Charlie Niebergall	9	28	3	.107	0	1
Taylor Douthit	9	27	5	.185	0	0
Jimmy Hudgens	6	12	3	.250	0	0
Joe Schultz	2	7	2	.286	0	1
Speed Walker	2	7	2	.286	0	1
George Kopshaw	2	5	1	.200	0	0
Tige Stone	5	1	1	1.000	0	0
Burt Shotton	1	0	0	----	0	0

=== Pitching ===
==== Starting pitchers ====
Note: G = Games pitched; IP = Innings pitched; W = Wins; L = Losses; ERA = Earned run average; SO = Strikeouts

Player	G	IP	W	L	ERA	SO
Jesse Haines	37	266.0	20	13	3.11	73
Bill Sherdel	39	225.0	15	13	4.32	78
Fred Toney	29	196.2	11	12	3.84	48
Bill Doak	30	185.0	8	13	3.26	53
Jeff Pfeffer	26	152.1	8	9	4.02	32
Eddie Dyer	4	22.0	2	1	4.09	7
Bill Pertica	1	2.1	0	0	3.86	0

==== Other pitchers ====
Note: G = Games pitched; IP = Innings pitched; W = Wins; L = Losses; ERA = Earned run average; SO = Strikeouts

Player	G	IP	W	L	ERA	SO
Johnny Stuart	37	149.2	9	5	4.27	55
Epp Sell	5	15.0	0	1	6.00	2

==== Relief pitchers ====
Note: G = Games pitched; W = Wins; L = Losses; SV = Saves; ERA = Earned run average; SO = Strikeouts

Player	G	W	L	SV	ERA	SO
Lou North	34	3	4	1	5.15	24
Clyde Barfoot	33	3	3	1	3.73	23
Fred Wigington	4	0	0	0	3.24	2
Tige Stone	1	0	0	0	12.00	1

== Awards and honors ==
=== League leaders ===
- Rogers Hornsby, National League batting champion

== Farm system ==
Level	Team	League	Manager
AA	Syracuse Stars	International League	Frank Shaughnessy
A	Houston Buffaloes	Texas League	Hunter Hill
B	Petersburg Trunkmakers	Virginia League	George Block and Baldy Altermatt
C	Fort Smith Twins	Western Association	Fred Hunter and Mickey Doolan
D	Vicksburg Hill Billies	Cotton States League	Cy Slapnicka and Ollie Mills
