= Herb McQuaid =

American baseball player (1899–1966)

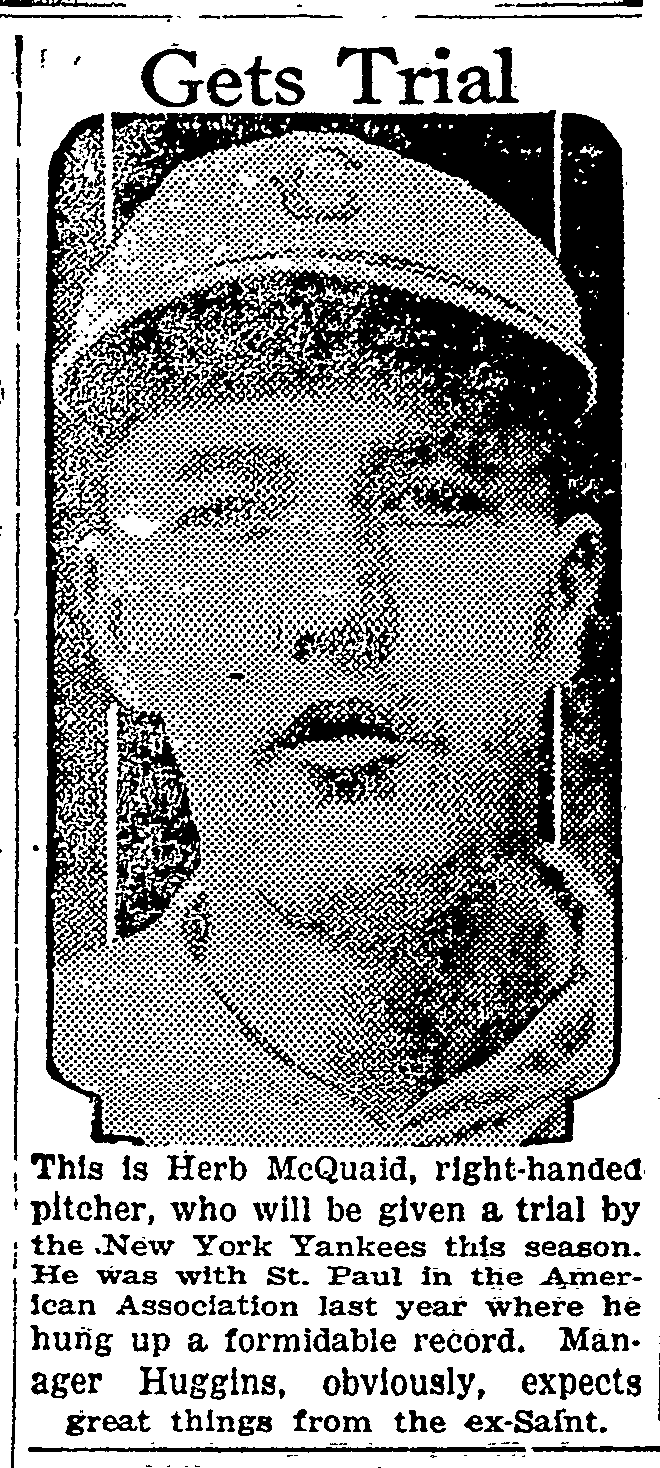
- Pitcher
- Born: March 29, 1899; San Francisco, California
- Died: April 4, 1966 (aged 67); Richmond, California
- Batted: Right Threw: Right

MLB debut
- June 22, 1923, for the Cincinnati Reds

Last MLB appearance
- September 13, 1923, for the New York Yankees

MLB statistics
- Win–loss record: 2–0
- Earned run average: 4.33
- Strikeouts: 15

Teams
- Cincinnati Reds (1923); New York Yankees (1926)

Herbert George McQuaid (March 29, 1899 – April 4, 1966) was a Major League Baseball pitcher. McQuaid played for the Cincinnati Reds in 1923 and the New York Yankees in 1926. In 29 career games, he had a 2–0 record, with a 4.33 ERA. He batted and threw right-handed.

McQuaid was born in San Francisco, California, and died in Richmond, California.
