= Dee Cousineau =

American baseball player (1898-1951)

- Catcher
- Born: December 16, 1898; Watertown, Massachusetts, U.S.
- Died: July 14, 1951 (aged 52); Watertown, Massachusetts, U.S.
- Batted: Right Threw: Right

MLB debut
- October 6, 1923, for the Boston Braves

Last MLB appearance
- May 2, 1925, for the Boston Braves

MLB statistics
- Batting average: .500
- Home runs: 0
- Runs batted in: 2
- Stats at Baseball Reference

Teams
- Boston Braves (1923–25)

Edward Thomas "Dee" Cousineau (December 16, 1898 – July 14, 1951) was an American professional baseball player. He played in five games in Major League Baseball for the Boston Braves over three seasons: one in 1923, three in 1924, and one in 1925, all as a catcher. In 1923, he went 2-for-2 at the plate for a 1.000 batting average, but in 1924 he went 0-for-2 to bring his career average to .500.
