= Joe Batchelder =

American baseball player (1898-1989)

- Pitcher
- Born: July 11, 1898; Wenham, Massachusetts, U.S.
- Died: May 5, 1989 (aged 90); Beverly, Massachusetts, U.S.
- Batted: Right Threw: Left

MLB debut
- September 29, 1923, for the Boston Braves

Last MLB appearance
- May 20, 1925, for the Boston Braves

MLB statistics
- Win–loss record: 1–0
- Strikeouts: 6
- Earned run average: 5.66
- Stats at Baseball Reference

Teams
- Boston Braves (1923–1925)

Joseph Edmund Batchelder [Win] (July 11, 1898 – May 5, 1989) was an American relief pitcher in Major League Baseball who played from 1923 through 1925 for the Boston Braves. Listed at 5 ft 7 in (1.70 m), 165 lb., Batchelder batted right-handed and threw left-handed.

In a three-season career, Batchelder posted a 1–0 record with a 5.66 ERA in 11 appearances, including one start and one complete game, giving up 13 earned runs on 26 hits and four walks while striking out six in 20 2/3 innings of work.
