= George Abrams =

American baseball player (1899–1986)

- Pitcher
- Born: November 9, 1899; Seattle, Washington, U.S.
- Died: December 5, 1986 (aged 87); Clearwater, Florida, U.S.
- Batted: Right Threw: Right

MLB debut
- April 19, 1923, for the Cincinnati Reds

Last MLB appearance
- May 4, 1923, for the Cincinnati Reds

MLB statistics
- Games pitched: 3
- Win–loss record: 0–0
- Earned run average: 9.64
- SO / BB: 1 / 3
- Innings pitched: 4 2/3
- Stats at Baseball Reference

Teams
- Cincinnati Reds (1923)

George Allen Abrams (November 9, 1897 – December 5, 1986) was an American Major League Baseball (MLB) pitcher who made three relief appearances for the Cincinnati Reds in its 1923 season.

A single in his only MLB at-bat left Abrams with a perfect career batting average of 1.000.
