= Haddie Gill =

American baseball player (1899–1932)

- Pitcher
- Born: January 23, 1899; Brockton, Massachusetts, U.S.
- Died: August 1, 1932 (aged 33); Brockton, Massachusetts, U.S.
- Batted: Left Threw: Left

MLB debut
- August 16, 1923, for the Cincinnati Reds

Last MLB appearance
- August 16, 1923, for the Cincinnati Reds

MLB statistics
- Games pitched: 1
- Earned run average: 0.00
- Strikeouts: 1
- Stats at Baseball Reference

Teams
- Cincinnati Reds (1923)

Harold Edward "Haddie" Gill (January 23, 1899 – August 1, 1932) was an American professional baseball pitcher who played in one game for the Cincinnati Reds on August 16, 1923.

Gill died after complications from an appendicitis surgery.
