= Frank Luce =

American baseball player (1896–1942)

- Outfielder
- Born: December 6, 1896; Spencer, Ohio, U.S.
- Died: February 3, 1942 (aged 45); Milwaukee, Wisconsin, U.S.
- Batted: Left Threw: Right

MLB debut
- September 17, 1923, for the Pittsburgh Pirates

Last MLB appearance
- October 7, 1923, for the Pittsburgh Pirates

MLB statistics
- Batting average: .500
- Home runs: 0
- Runs batted in: 3
- Stats at Baseball Reference

Teams
- Pittsburgh Pirates (1923)

Frank Edward Luce (December 6, 1896 – February 3, 1942) was an American outfielder in Major League Baseball. He played for the Pittsburgh Pirates in 1923.
