= Tony Boeckel =

American baseball player (1892–1924)

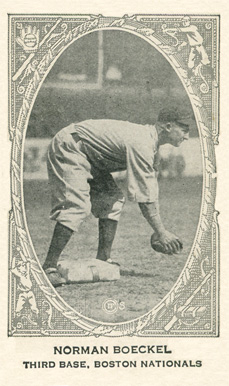
- Norman "Tony" Boeckel 1922 baseball card
- Third baseman
- Born: August 25, 1892; Los Angeles, California, U.S.
- Died: February 16, 1924 (aged 31); La Jolla, California, U.S.
- Batted: Right Threw: Right

MLB debut
- July 23, 1917, for the Pittsburgh Pirates

Last MLB appearance
- October 6, 1923, for the Boston Braves

MLB statistics
- Batting average: .282
- Home runs: 27
- Runs batted in: 337
- Stats at Baseball Reference

Teams
- Pittsburgh Pirates (1917, 1919); Boston Braves (1919–1923)

Norman Doxie "Tony" Boeckel (August 25, 1892 – February 16, 1924) was an American Major League Baseball (MLB) infielder who played six seasons with the Pittsburgh Pirates and the Boston Braves of the National League (NL). He drove in one of the runs scored in a 1–1 tie game on May 1, 1920 that lasted a record-breaking 26 innings. Boeckel was an active MLB player when he was killed in an automobile accident.

== Early life ==
Boeckel was born in 1892 in Los Angeles. He played minor league baseball for several teams before his MLB career. Boeckel's minor league career began with the Stockton Producers of the California State League. He split the 1914 season between Stockton and the Tacoma Tigers of the Northwestern League. He moved to another Northwestern League team, the Great Falls Electrics, for 1916 and part of 1917. Boeckel's minor league statistics are only complete for 1913, when he hit for a .268 batting average in 115 games and committed 49 errors in 579 total chances.

== Major league career ==
In 1917, Boeckel made his MLB debut with the Pittsburgh Pirates. During his first game, he had to be carried off the field due to heat prostration. He returned to the field two days later and was struck in the head by a line drive. The head wound required several stitches and he missed another week of play. He played in 65 games for Pittsburgh that year, hitting .265 and tallying 23 runs batted in (RBI).

Before the 1918 season, Boeckel lost 15 pounds (6.8 kg). Pittsburgh manager Hugo Bezdek was pleased and said that Boeckel's weight had been an impediment the previous year. However, Boeckel missed the season after enlisting in the navy. Pittsburgh acquired third baseman Walter Barbare in 1919, so the team placed Boeckel on waivers early in the season. He was obtained off waivers by the Boston Braves. Between the two teams, Boeckel appeared in 140 games that season. He was one of three NL players to reach that number of games played.

In 1920, Boeckel had eleven at bats in the record-breaking 26-inning game between the Braves and the Brooklyn Dodgers. His sixth-inning single accounted for Boston's only RBI and the game was later declared a tie when it became too dark to continue.

Boeckel reached career highs in several offensive categories in 1921. He batted .313 with 10 home runs and 84 RBI. He also registered 20 stolen bases, nearly matching his career high of 21 steals. In 1922, Boeckel struggled with a toe injury. He aggravated the injury during the following preseason, but a newspaper report at the time called him "a mighty fine ball player when the veteran is right." A collegiate player named Arthur Conlon briefly challenged Boeckel for the third base position in 1923, but Conlon's play fizzled and Boeckel remained the starter.

Boeckel struggled at times with defensive mishaps. He led the league three times (1920, 1921 and 1923) in errors by a third baseman. Boeckel played with the Braves from 1919 to 1923; during those seasons, the team did not finish higher than fourth place in the league standings.

== Death ==
On February 15, 1924, Boeckel was severely injured in an auto accident in San Diego. (A friend, New York Yankees outfielder Bob Meusel, was unhurt.) He died the next day at the age of 31.

Braves club secretary Edwin L. Riley referred to Boeckel's death as a "real personal loss" and he indicated that Boeckel was also close to club president Christy Mathewson. The Braves wore mourning bands in 1924 to honor Boeckel. A bronze tablet at Braves Field was later dedicated to Boeckel's memory.

== See also ==
- List of baseball players who died during their careers
