= Speed Walker =

American baseball player (1898–1959)

- First baseman
- Born: January 23, 1898; Munhall, Pennsylvania, U.S.
- Died: June 20, 1959 (aged 61); West Mifflin, Pennsylvania, U.S.
- Batted: Right Threw: Right

MLB debut
- September 15, 1923, for the St. Louis Cardinals

Last MLB appearance
- July 7, 1923, for the St. Louis Cardinals

MLB statistics
- Batting average: .286
- Hits: 2
- Runs scored: 1
- Stats at Baseball Reference

Teams
- St. Louis Cardinals (1923)

Joseph Richard "Speed" Walker (January 23, 1898 – June 20, 1959) was an American Major League Baseball player. Walker played for St. Louis Cardinals in the 1923 season. He played just two games in his career, having two hits in seven at-bats, with one run scored, playing first base.

Walker was born in Munhall, Pennsylvania, and died in West Mifflin, Pennsylvania.
