= 1923 Pittsburgh Pirates season =

1923 Pittsburgh Pirates
- League: National League
- Ballpark: Forbes Field
- City: Pittsburgh, Pennsylvania
- Owners: Barney Dreyfuss
- Managers: Bill McKechnie

The 1923 Pittsburgh Pirates season was the 42nd season of the Pittsburgh Pirates franchise; the 37th in the National League. The Pirates finished third in the league standings with a record of 87–67.

== Regular season ==
=== Season standings ===
National League
Team	W	L	Pct.	GB	Home	Road
New York Giants	95	58	.621	—	47‍–‍30	48‍–‍28
Cincinnati Reds	91	63	.591	4½	46‍–‍32	45‍–‍31
Pittsburgh Pirates	87	67	.565	8½	47‍–‍30	40‍–‍37
Chicago Cubs	83	71	.539	12½	46‍–‍31	37‍–‍40
St. Louis Cardinals	79	74	.516	16	42‍–‍35	37‍–‍39
Brooklyn Robins	76	78	.494	19½	37‍–‍40	39‍–‍38
Boston Braves	54	100	.351	41½	22‍–‍55	32‍–‍45
Philadelphia Phillies	50	104	.325	45½	20‍–‍55	30‍–‍49

=== Record vs. opponents ===
1923 National League record Sources:
Team	BSN	BRO	CHC	CIN	NYG	PHI	PIT	STL
Boston	—	8–14	6–16	7–15	6–16	13–9	5–17	9–13–1
Brooklyn	14–8	—	10–12	8–14	11–11	12–10–1	11–11	10–12
Chicago	16–6	12–10	—	9–13	10–12	13–9	11–11	12–10
Cincinnati	15–7	14–8	13–9	—	12–10	19–3	8–14	10–12
New York	16–6	11–11	12–10	10–12	—	19–3	13–9	14–7
Philadelphia	9–13	10–12–1	9–13	3–19	3–19	—	9–13	7–15
Pittsburgh	17–5	11–11	11–11	14–8	9–13	13–9	—	12–10
St. Louis	13–9–1	12–10	10–12	12–10	7–14	15–7	10–12	—

=== Game log ===
1923 Game Log: 87–67 (Home: 47–30; Away: 40–37)
April: 6–7 (Home: 3–0; Away: 3–7)

#	Date	Opponent	Score	Win	Loss	Save	Attendance	Record
1	April 17	@ Cubs	3–2	**Morrison** (1–0)	Osborne	—	33,000	1–0
2	April 18	@ Cubs	2–7	Alexander	**Boehler** (0–1)	—	—	1–1
3	April 19	@ Cubs	5–10	Aldridge	**Adams** (0–1)	—	—	1–2
4	April 20	@ Cubs	11–12	Osborne	**Adams** (0–2)	—	—	1–3
5	April 21	@ Reds	6–12	Donohue	**Cooper** (0–1)	—	—	1–4
6	April 22	@ Reds	15–9	**Morrison** (2–0)	Rixey	**Bagby** (1)	—	2–4
7	April 23	@ Reds	8–4	**Boehler** (1–1)	Couch	**Glazner** (1)	—	3–4
8	April 24	@ Reds	4–5	Luque	**Kunz** (0–1)	—	—	3–5
9	April 25	Cubs	7–3	**Cooper** (1–1)	Fussell	—	30,000	4–5
10	April 26	Cubs	7–2	**Adams** (1–2)	Osborne	—	—	5–5
11	April 27	Cubs	2–1	**Morrison** (3–0)	Alexander	—	—	6–5
12	April 29	@ Cardinals	2–3	Haines	**Glazner** (0–1)	—	—	6–6
13	April 30	@ Cardinals	5–7	Doak	**Boehler** (1–2)	Sherdel	5,000	6–7

May: 18–9 (Home: 9–1; Away: 9–8)

#	Date	Opponent	Score	Win	Loss	Save	Attendance	Record
14	May 1	@ Cardinals	6–2	**Cooper** (2–1)	Sherdel	—	3,500	7–7
15	May 2	@ Cardinals	1–12	Pfeffer	**Morrison** (3–1)	—	2,000	7–8
16	May 3	Reds	3–1	**Adams** (2–2)	Donohue	—	3,000	8–8
17	May 4	Reds	11–6	**Glazner** (1–1)	Rixey	**Bagby** (2)	—	9–8
18	May 5	Reds	10–7	**Cooper** (3–1)	Keck	**Morrison** (1)	—	10–8
19	May 6	@ Reds	7–8	Donohue	**Hamilton** (0–1)	—	—	10–9
20	May 7	Cardinals	11–4	**Adams** (3–2)	Sherdel	—	8,000	11–9
21	May 8	@ Robins	8–6	**Morrison** (4–1)	Harper	—	3,500	12–9
22	May 11	@ Robins	6–7	Grimes	**Bagby** (0–1)	—	2,000	12–10
23	May 13	@ Giants	0–9	McQuillan	**Cooper** (3–2)	—	35,000	12–11
24	May 14	@ Giants	4–1	**Adams** (4–2)	Nehf	—	8,000	13–11
25	May 16	@ Giants	2–6	Scott	**Morrison** (4–2)	—	5,000	13–12
26	May 17	@ Braves	0–1 (10)	Rudolph	**Cooper** (3–3)	—	—	13–13
27	May 18	@ Braves	4–3	**Adams** (5–2)	Fillingim	**Kunz** (1)	—	14–13
28	May 19	@ Braves	5–0	**Glazner** (2–1)	McNamara	—	—	15–13
29	May 21	@ Phillies	5–3	**Morrison** (5–2)	Behan	—	—	16–13
30	May 22	@ Phillies	13–6	**Cooper** (4–3)	Meadows	—	—	17–13
31	May 23	@ Phillies	7–6	**Kunz** (1–1)	Head	—	—	18–13
32	May 24	Cardinals	11–4	**Adams** (6–2)	Sherdel	—	10,000	19–13
33	May 25	Cardinals	2–1	**Morrison** (6–2)	Doak	—	6,000	20–13
34	May 26	Cardinals	4–5	Haines	**Cooper** (4–4)	—	15,000	20–14
35	May 27	@ Cubs	4–2	**Meadows** (1–0)	Aldridge	—	—	21–14
36	May 28	@ Cubs	4–5 (11)	Fussell	**Kunz** (1–2)	—	—	21–15
37	May 29	Cubs	7–6	**Bagby** (1–1)	Stueland	—	—	22–15
38	May 30	Cubs	5–4	**Morrison** (7–2)	Kaufmann	—	20,000	23–15
39	May 30	Cubs	10–2	**Cooper** (5–4)	Aldridge	—	30,000	24–15
40	May 31	@ Cardinals	1–4	Toney	**Meadows** (1–1)	—	1,000	24–16

June: 15–8 (Home: 11–6; Away: 4–2)

#	Date	Opponent	Score	Win	Loss	Save	Attendance	Record
41	June 1	@ Cardinals	3–4 (11)	Pfeffer	**Hamilton** (0–2)	—	—	24–17
42	June 3	@ Cardinals	3–4	Haines	**Cooper** (5–5)	—	—	24–18
43	June 4	Robins	3–5	Grimes	**Morrison** (7–3)	—	7,000	24–19
44	June 5	Robins	5–2	**Meadows** (2–1)	Dickerman	—	5,000	25–19
45	June 6	Robins	7–3	**Hamilton** (1–2)	Ruether	—	4,000	26–19
46	June 8	Giants	9–6	**Morrison** (8–3)	McQuillan	—	15,000	27–19
47	June 9	Giants	0–6	Bentley	**Meadows** (2–2)	—	30,000	27–20
48	June 12	Giants	4–2	**Cooper** (6–5)	Nehf	—	15,000	28–20
49	June 13	Phillies	4–2	**Morrison** (9–3)	Behan	—	—	29–20
50	June 14	Phillies	1–2	Ring	**Meadows** (2–3)	—	—	29–21
51	June 16	Phillies	4–1	**Cooper** (7–5)	Weinert	—	—	30–21
52	June 18	Braves	8–3	**Morrison** (10–3)	Marquard	—	—	31–21
53	June 20	Braves	8–14 (10)	Benton	**Boehler** (1–3)	Barnes	—	31–22
54	June 21	Braves	2–1	**Adams** (7–2)	Barnes	—	3,000	32–22
55	June 22	Reds	8–2	**Meadows** (3–3)	Donohue	—	—	33–22
56	June 23	Reds	4–5	Rixey	**Cooper** (7–6)	Benton	10,000	33–23
57	June 24	@ Cardinals	6–4	**Morrison** (11–3)	Pfeffer	**Bagby** (3)	—	34–23
58	June 25	@ Cardinals	3–1	**Hamilton** (2–2)	Haines	—	5,000	35–23
59	June 26	@ Cardinals	7–5	**Meadows** (4–3)	Doak	**Adams** (1)	2,000	36–23
60	June 27	@ Cardinals	6–0	**Cooper** (8–6)	Sherdel	—	2,000	37–23
61	June 29	Reds	0–2	Luque	**Morrison** (11–4)	—	—	37–24
62	June 29	Reds	5–3	**Bagby** (2–1)	Benton	—	—	38–24
63	June 30	Reds	4–3	**Adams** (8–2)	Rixey	—	22,000	39–24

July: 19–13 (Home: 10–3; Away: 9–10)

#	Date	Opponent	Score	Win	Loss	Save	Attendance	Record
64	July 1	@ Reds	2–3	Donohue	**Cooper** (8–7)	Luque	—	39–25
65	July 2	Cardinals	4–1	**Hamilton** (3–2)	Pfeffer	—	—	40–25
66	July 3	Cardinals	4–2	**Meadows** (5–3)	Toney	—	8,000	41–25
67	July 4	Cardinals	7–5	**Cooper** (9–7)	Pfeffer	—	—	42–25
68	July 4	Cardinals	6–1	**Morrison** (12–4)	Haines	—	—	43–25
69	July 6	@ Phillies	2–5	Mitchell	**Cooper** (9–8)	—	1,000	43–26
70	July 7	@ Phillies	18–5	**Meadows** (6–3)	Glazner	—	—	44–26
71	July 9	@ Phillies	2–4	Behan	**Morrison** (12–5)	—	—	44–27
72	July 10	@ Giants	8–9 (10)	Blume	**Bagby** (2–2)	—	10,000	44–28
73	July 11	@ Giants	1–6	Watson	**Hamilton** (3–3)	—	—	44–29
74	July 12	@ Giants	5–3	**Meadows** (7–3)	McQuillan	—	25,000	45–29
75	July 12	@ Giants	2–4	Scott	**Adams** (8–3)	—	40,000	45–30
76	July 13	@ Giants	10–1	**Morrison** (13–5)	Bentley	—	7,500	46–30
77	July 14	@ Robins	1–2	Vance	**Cooper** (9–9)	—	20,000	46–31
78	July 14	@ Robins	5–3	**Bagby** (3–2)	Henry	—	23,000	47–31
79	July 15	@ Robins	3–2	**Hamilton** (4–3)	Ruether	—	15,000	48–31
80	July 16	@ Robins	4–8	Grimes	**Meadows** (7–4)	—	—	48–32
81	July 17	@ Robins	2–6	Smith	**Morrison** (13–6)	—	2,500	48–33
82	July 18	@ Braves	5–1	**Cooper** (10–9)	Marquard	—	—	49–33
83	July 19	@ Braves	8–6	**Meadows** (8–4)	Barnes	**Morrison** (2)	—	50–33
84	July 20	@ Braves	5–8	Genewich	**Hamilton** (4–4)	—	—	50–34
85	July 21	@ Braves	14–4	**Morrison** (14–6)	McNamara	—	—	51–34
86	July 21	@ Braves	6–4	**Cooper** (11–9)	Miller	—	—	52–34
87	July 23	Cubs	3–12 (12)	Alexander	**Meadows** (8–5)	—	—	52–35
88	July 25	Braves	5–2	**Adams** (9–3)	Benton	—	—	53–35
89	July 25	Braves	10–3	**Morrison** (15–6)	Fillingim	—	—	54–35
90	July 26	Braves	8–7 (12)	**Hamilton** (5–4)	Barnes	—	—	55–35
91	July 27	Braves	8–5	**Meadows** (9–5)	Oeschger	—	—	56–35
92	July 28	Braves	3–1	**Cooper** (12–9)	Genewich	—	—	57–35
93	July 30	Giants	5–4	**Steineder** (1–0)	Scott	—	32,000	58–35
94	July 30	Giants	2–17	Nehf	**Morrison** (15–7)	Jonnard	32,000	58–36
95	July 31	Giants	4–5	McQuillan	**Hamilton** (5–5)	Ryan	10,000	58–37

August: 14–14 (Home: 4–9; Away: 10–5)

#	Date	Opponent	Score	Win	Loss	Save	Attendance	Record
96	August 1	Giants	2–1	**Cooper** (13–9)	Bentley	—	15,000	59–37
97	August 2	Giants	2–3	Watson	**Meadows** (9–6)	—	18,000	59–38
98	August 4	Phillies	2–4	Ring	**Adams** (9–4)	—	—	59–39
99	August 4	Phillies	4–3	**Morrison** (16–7)	Weinert	—	—	60–39
100	August 6	Phillies	4–6	Mitchell	**Cooper** (13–10)	—	—	60–40
101	August 7	Phillies	5–7	Glazner	**Meadows** (9–7)	Behan	—	60–41
102	August 8	Robins	2–9	Vance	**Hamilton** (5–6)	—	5,000	60–42
103	August 8	Robins	5–2	**Morrison** (17–7)	Grimes	—	7,000	61–42
104	August 9	Robins	6–2	**Adams** (10–4)	Dickerman	—	4,000	62–42
105	August 11	Robins	6–7	Ruether	**Cooper** (13–11)	—	12,000	62–43
106	August 12	@ Robins	2–11	Vance	**Hamilton** (5–7)	—	22,000	62–44
107	August 12	@ Robins	0–6	Grimes	**Morrison** (17–8)	—	22,000	62–45
108	August 13	@ Robins	5–2	**Meadows** (10–7)	Smith	—	4,000	63–45
109	August 14	@ Phillies	10–16	Couch	**Stone** (0–1)	Weinert	—	63–46
110	August 15	@ Phillies	4–3	**Cooper** (14–11)	Behan	—	—	64–46
111	August 16	@ Phillies	5–8	Betts	**Morrison** (17–9)	—	—	64–47
112	August 17	@ Phillies	11–6	**Hamilton** (6–7)	Ring	—	—	65–47
113	August 18	@ Phillies	9–8 (13)	**Adams** (11–4)	Ring	—	10,000	66–47
114	August 19	@ Giants	1–2 (12)	Scott	**Cooper** (14–12)	—	25,000	66–48
115	August 20	@ Giants	3–1	**Morrison** (18–9)	Nehf	—	7,000	67–48
116	August 21	@ Giants	9–5	**Adams** (12–4)	Watson	**Hamilton** (1)	8,000	68–48
117	August 23	@ Braves	8–3	**Meadows** (11–7)	Barnes	—	—	69–48
118	August 24	@ Braves	7–2	**Cooper** (15–12)	Oeschger	—	—	70–48
119	August 25	@ Braves	5–2	**Morrison** (19–9)	Marquard	—	—	71–48
120	August 26	@ Robins	9–2	**Adams** (13–4)	Ruether	—	10,000	72–48
121	August 29	Cubs	2–6	Kaufmann	**Cooper** (15–13)	—	5,000	72–49
122	August 30	Cardinals	4–6	Haines	**Morrison** (19–10)	—	5,000	72–50
123	August 31	Cardinals	2–3	Doak	**Cooper** (15–14)	—	4,500	72–51

September: 13–16 (Home: 10–11; Away: 3–5)

#	Date	Opponent	Score	Win	Loss	Save	Attendance	Record
124	September 1	Cardinals	2–8	Sherdel	**Adams** (13–5)	—	10,000	72–52
125	September 2	@ Cubs	8–6 (11)	**Meadows** (12–7)	Kaufmann	—	—	73–52
126	September 3	Reds	7–2	**Morrison** (20–10)	Benton	—	—	74–52
127	September 4	Reds	1–2	Rixey	**Cooper** (15–15)	—	7,000	74–53
128	September 5	Reds	6–2	**Meadows** (13–7)	Luque	—	5,000	75–53
129	September 6	Cubs	5–1 (5)	**Hamilton** (7–7)	Alexander	—	—	76–53
130	September 7	Cubs	4–6	Keen	**Adams** (13–6)	—	—	76–54
131	September 8	Cubs	4–0	**Morrison** (21–10)	Aldridge	—	—	77–54
132	September 9	@ Reds	3–8	Luque	**Cooper** (15–16)	—	10,000	77–55
133	September 10	@ Reds	8–0	**Meadows** (14–7)	Donohue	—	—	78–55
134	September 11	@ Reds	4–3	**Morrison** (22–10)	Benton	—	—	79–55
135	September 13	Robins	4–7	Vance	**Hamilton** (7–8)	—	5,000	79–56
136	September 13	Robins	6–3	**Cooper** (16–16)	Henry	—	12,000	80–56
137	September 15	Robins	4–1	**Meadows** (15–7)	Ruether	—	6,000	81–56
138	September 15	Robins	2–13	Grimes	**Morrison** (22–11)	—	12,000	81–57
139	September 17	Braves	1–6	Marquard	**Cooper** (16–17)	—	—	81–58
140	September 18	Braves	12–2	**Morrison** (23–11)	Barnes	—	—	82–58
141	September 19	Braves	4–5	Genewich	**Adams** (13–7)	—	—	82–59
142	September 21	Giants	4–8	Scott	**Meadows** (15–8)	Nehf	10,000	82–60
143	September 21	Giants	1–8	Watson	**Cooper** (16–18)	—	20,000	82–61
144	September 22	Giants	3–4	Bentley	**Morrison** (23–12)	—	—	82–62
145	September 24	Phillies	2–4	Couch	**Meadows** (15–9)	Behan	—	82–63
146	September 24	Phillies	4–3 (10)	**Cooper** (17–18)	Betts	—	—	83–63
147	September 25	Phillies	18–5	**Steineder** (2–0)	Glazner	—	—	84–63
148	September 26	Phillies	6–0	**Morrison** (24–12)	Behan	—	—	85–63
149	September 27	@ Cubs	2–8	Keen	**Hamilton** (7–9)	—	—	85–64
150	September 28	@ Cubs	1–2	Aldridge	**Cooper** (17–19)	—	—	85–65
151	September 29	@ Cubs	4–5 (10)	Alexander	**Meadows** (15–10)	—	—	85–66
152	September 30	@ Cubs	4–5	Wheeler	**Morrison** (24–13)	—	20,000	85–67

October: 2–0 (Home: 0–0; Away: 2–0)

#	Date	Opponent	Score	Win	Loss	Save	Attendance	Record
153	October 6	@ Reds	7–1	**Meadows** (16–10)	Rixey	—	—	86–67
154	October 7	@ Reds	7–5	**Morrison** (25–13)	Donohue	—	—	87–67

Legend: = Win = Loss
Bold = Pirates team member

=== Notable transactions ===
- May 22, 1923: Cotton Tierney, Whitey Glazner and $50,000 were traded by the Pirates to the Philadelphia Phillies for Lee Meadows and Johnny Rawlings.

=== Roster ===
1923 Pittsburgh Pirates
**Roster**
**Pitchers**: Babe Adams; Jim Bagby; George Boehler; Hal Carlson; Wilbur Cooper; Whitey Glazner; Earl Hamilton; Earl Kunz; Lee Meadows; Johnny Morrison; Ray Steineder; Arnie Stone	**Catchers**: Johnny Gooch; Jim Mattox; Walter Schmidt; **Infielders**: Spencer Adams; Eppie Barnes; Jewel Ens; Charlie Grimm; Rabbit Maranville; Eddie Moore; Johnny Rawlings; Cotton Tierney; Pie Traynor	**Outfielders**: Clyde Barnhart; Carson Bigbee; Max Carey; Kiki Cuyler; Frank Luce; Walter Mueller; Reb Russell	**Manager**: Bill McKechnie

== Player stats ==
=== Batting ===
==== Starters by position ====
Note: Pos = Position; G = Games played; AB = At bats; H = Hits; Avg. = Batting average; HR = Home runs; RBI = Runs batted in

Pos	Player	G	AB	H	Avg.	HR	RBI
C	Walter Schmidt	97	335	83	.248	0	37
1B	Charlie Grimm	152	563	194	.345	7	99
2B	Johnny Rawlings	119	461	131	.284	1	45
SS	Rabbit Maranville	141	581	161	.277	1	41
3B	Pie Traynor	153	616	208	.338	12	101
OF	Max Carey	153	610	188	.308	6	63
OF	Carson Bigbee	123	499	149	.299	0	54
OF	Clyde Barnhart	114	327	106	.324	9	72

==== Other batters ====
Note: G = Games played; AB = At bats; H = Hits; Avg. = Batting average; HR = Home runs; RBI = Runs batted in

Player	G	AB	H	Avg.	HR	RBI
Reb Russell	94	291	84	.289	9	58
Johnny Gooch	66	202	56	.277	1	20
Cotton Tierney	29	120	35	.292	2	23
Walter Mueller	40	111	34	.306	0	20
Spencer Adams	25	56	14	.250	0	4
Kiki Cuyler	11	40	10	.250	0	2
Jim Mattox	22	32	6	.188	0	1
Jewel Ens	12	29	8	.276	0	5
Eddie Moore	6	26	7	.269	0	1
Frank Luce	9	12	6	.500	0	3
Eppie Barnes	2	2	1	.500	0	0

=== Pitching ===
==== Starting pitchers ====
Note: G = Games pitched; IP = Innings pitched; W = Wins; L = Losses; ERA = Earned run average; SO = Strikeouts

Player	G	IP	W	L	ERA	SO
Johnny Morrison	42	301.2	25	13	3.49	114
Wilbur Cooper	39	294.2	17	19	3.57	77
Lee Meadows	31	227.0	16	10	3.01	66
Babe Adams	26	158.2	13	7	4.42	38

==== Other pitchers ====
Note: G = Games pitched; IP = Innings pitched; W = Wins; L = Losses; ERA = Earned run average; SO = Strikeouts

Player	G	IP	W	L	ERA	SO
Earl Hamilton	28	141.0	7	9	3.77	42
Jim Bagby	21	68.2	3	2	5.24	16
Ray Steineder	15	55.0	2	0	4.75	23
Whitey Glazner	7	30.0	2	1	3.30	8
George Boehler	10	28.1	1	3	6.04	12

==== Relief pitchers ====
Note: G = Games pitched; W = Wins; L = Losses; SV = Saves; ERA = Earned run average; SO = Strikeouts

Player	G	W	L	SV	ERA	SO
Earl Kunz	21	1	2	1	5.52	12
Arnie Stone	9	0	1	0	8.03	2
Hal Carlson	4	0	0	0	4.73	4
