= George Kopshaw =

American baseball player (1895–1934)

- Catcher
- Born: July 5, 1895; Passaic, New Jersey, U.S.
- Died: December 26, 1934 (aged 39); Lynchburg, Virginia, U.S.
- Batted: Right Threw: Right

MLB debut
- August 4, 1923, for the St. Louis Cardinals

Last MLB appearance
- August 5, 1923, for the St. Louis Cardinals

MLB statistics
- Batting average: .200
- Home runs: 0
- Runs batted in: 0
- Stats at Baseball Reference

Teams
- St. Louis Cardinals (1923)

George Karl Kopshaw (July 5, 1895 – December 26, 1934) was an American Major League Baseball catcher.

== Biography ==
He was born on July 5, 1895, in Passaic, New Jersey. He played for the St. Louis Cardinals in 1923. He died on December 26, 1934, in Lynchburg, Virginia.
