= 1923 Chicago Cubs season =

1923 Chicago Cubs
- League: National League
- Ballpark: Cubs Park
- City: Chicago
- Record: 83–71 (.539)
- League place: 4th
- Owners: William Wrigley Jr.
- Managers: Bill Killefer

The 1923 Chicago Cubs season was the 52nd season of the Chicago Cubs franchise, the 48th in the National League and the eighth at Wrigley Field (then known as "Cubs Park"). The Cubs finished fourth in the National League with a record of 83–71.

== Regular season ==
=== Season standings ===
National League
Team	W	L	Pct.	GB	Home	Road
New York Giants	95	58	.621	—	47‍–‍30	48‍–‍28
Cincinnati Reds	91	63	.591	4½	46‍–‍32	45‍–‍31
Pittsburgh Pirates	87	67	.565	8½	47‍–‍30	40‍–‍37
Chicago Cubs	83	71	.539	12½	46‍–‍31	37‍–‍40
St. Louis Cardinals	79	74	.516	16	42‍–‍35	37‍–‍39
Brooklyn Robins	76	78	.494	19½	37‍–‍40	39‍–‍38
Boston Braves	54	100	.351	41½	22‍–‍55	32‍–‍45
Philadelphia Phillies	50	104	.325	45½	20‍–‍55	30‍–‍49

=== Record vs. opponents ===
1923 National League record Sources:
Team	BSN	BRO	CHC	CIN	NYG	PHI	PIT	STL
Boston	—	8–14	6–16	7–15	6–16	13–9	5–17	9–13–1
Brooklyn	14–8	—	10–12	8–14	11–11	12–10–1	11–11	10–12
Chicago	16–6	12–10	—	9–13	10–12	13–9	11–11	12–10
Cincinnati	15–7	14–8	13–9	—	12–10	19–3	8–14	10–12
New York	16–6	11–11	12–10	10–12	—	19–3	13–9	14–7
Philadelphia	9–13	10–12–1	9–13	3–19	3–19	—	9–13	7–15
Pittsburgh	17–5	11–11	11–11	14–8	9–13	13–9	—	12–10
St. Louis	13–9–1	12–10	10–12	12–10	7–14	15–7	10–12	—

=== Roster ===
1923 Chicago Cubs
Roster
Pitchers: Vic Aldridge; Pete Alexander; Guy Bush; Virgil Cheeves; Phil Collins; Nick Dumovich; Fred Fussell; Tony Kaufmann; Vic Keen; Tiny Osborne; Ed Stauffer; George Stueland	Catchers: Gabby Hartnett; Bob O'Farrell; Kettle Wirts; Infielders: Sparky Adams; Allen Elliott; Bernie Friberg; George Grantham; Ray Grimes; Charlie Hollocher; John Kelleher; Pete Turgeon	Outfielders: Marty Callaghan; Denver Grigsby; Cliff Heathcote; Hack Miller; Tony Murray; Jigger Statz; Otto Vogel; Butch Weis; Other batters: Bob Barrett	Manager: Bill Killefer; Coaches: Oscar Dugey

== Player stats ==
=== Batting ===
==== Starters by position ====
Note: Pos = Position; G = Games played; AB = At bats; H = Hits; Avg. = Batting average; HR = Home runs; RBI = Runs batted in

Pos	Player	G	AB	H	Avg.	HR	RBI
C	Bob O'Farrell	131	452	144	.319	12	84
1B	Ray Grimes	64	216	71	.329	2	36
2B	George Grantham	152	570	160	.281	8	70
SS	Sparky Adams	95	311	90	.289	4	35
3B	Bernie Friberg	146	547	174	.318	12	88
OF	Cliff Heathcote	117	393	98	.249	1	27
OF	Jigger Statz	154	655	209	.319	10	70
OF	Hack Miller	135	488	146	.301	20	88

==== Other batters ====
Note: G = Games played; AB = At bats; H = Hits; Avg. = Batting average; HR = Home runs; RBI = Runs batted in

Player	G	AB	H	Avg.	HR	RBI
Charlie Hollocher	66	260	89	.342	1	28
Gabby Hartnett	85	231	62	.268	8	39
John Kelleher	66	193	59	.306	6	21
Allen Elliott	53	168	42	.250	2	29
Marty Callaghan	61	129	29	.225	0	14
Otto Vogel	41	81	17	.210	1	6
Denver Grigsby	24	72	21	.292	0	5
Butch Weis	22	26	6	.231	0	2
Pete Turgeon	3	6	1	.167	0	0
Kettle Wirts	5	5	1	.200	0	1
Tony Murray	2	4	1	.250	0	0
Bob Barrett	3	3	1	.333	0	0

=== Pitching ===
==== Starting pitchers ====
Note: G = Games pitched; IP = Innings pitched; W = Wins; L = Losses; ERA = Earned run average; SO = Strikeouts

Player	G	IP	W	L	ERA	SO
Pete Alexander	39	305.0	22	12	3.19	72
Vic Aldridge	30	217.0	16	9	3.48	64
Tony Kaufmann	33	206.1	14	10	3.10	72
Rip Wheeler	3	24.0	1	2	4.88	5
Phil Collins	1	5.0	1	0	3.60	2

==== Other pitchers ====
Note: G = Games pitched; IP = Innings pitched; W = Wins; L = Losses; ERA = Earned run average; SO = Strikeouts

Player	G	IP	W	L	ERA	SO
Tiny Osborne	37	179.2	8	15	4.56	69
Vic Keen	35	177.0	12	8	3.00	46
Nick Dumovich	28	94.0	3	5	4.60	23
Virgil Cheeves	19	71.1	3	4	6.18	13

==== Relief pitchers ====
Note: G = Games pitched; W = Wins; L = Losses; SV = Saves; ERA = Earned run average; SO = Strikeouts

Player	G	W	L	SV	ERA	SO
Fred Fussell	28	3	5	3	5.54	38
George Stueland	6	0	1	0	5.63	2
Ed Stauffer	1	0	0	0	13.50	0
Guy Bush	1	0	0	0	0.00	2

== Farm system ==
- Class AA: Los Angeles Angels (Pacific Coast League; Marty Krug, manager)
