= 1923 New York Giants season =

1923 New York Giants
- National League champions
- League: National League
- Ballpark: Polo Grounds
- City: New York City
- Record: 95–58 (.621)
- League place: 1st
- Owners: Charles Stoneham
- Managers: John McGraw

The 1923 New York Giants season was the franchise's 41st season. The Giants won the National League pennant with a 95–58 record. The team went on to lose to the New York Yankees in the World Series, four games to two.

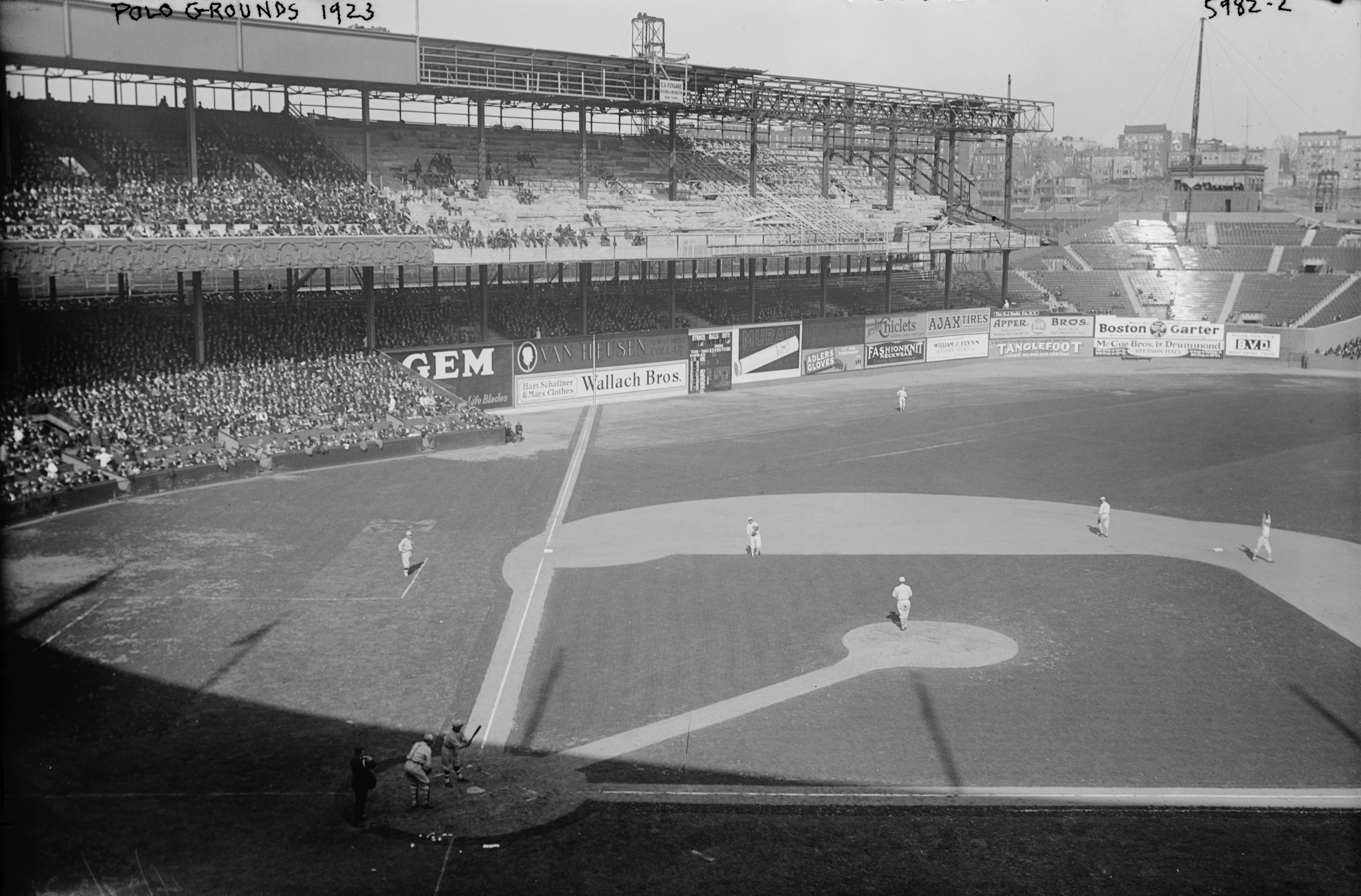
The Polo Grounds during the 1923 season, with outfield seating expansion in progress.

== Regular season ==
=== Season standings ===
National League
Team	W	L	Pct.	GB	Home	Road
New York Giants	95	58	.621	—	47‍–‍30	48‍–‍28
Cincinnati Reds	91	63	.591	4½	46‍–‍32	45‍–‍31
Pittsburgh Pirates	87	67	.565	8½	47‍–‍30	40‍–‍37
Chicago Cubs	83	71	.539	12½	46‍–‍31	37‍–‍40
St. Louis Cardinals	79	74	.516	16	42‍–‍35	37‍–‍39
Brooklyn Robins	76	78	.494	19½	37‍–‍40	39‍–‍38
Boston Braves	54	100	.351	41½	22‍–‍55	32‍–‍45
Philadelphia Phillies	50	104	.325	45½	20‍–‍55	30‍–‍49

=== Record vs. opponents ===
1923 National League record Sources:
Team	BSN	BRO	CHC	CIN	NYG	PHI	PIT	STL
Boston	—	8–14	6–16	7–15	6–16	13–9	5–17	9–13–1
Brooklyn	14–8	—	10–12	8–14	11–11	12–10–1	11–11	10–12
Chicago	16–6	12–10	—	9–13	10–12	13–9	11–11	12–10
Cincinnati	15–7	14–8	13–9	—	12–10	19–3	8–14	10–12
New York	16–6	11–11	12–10	10–12	—	19–3	13–9	14–7
Philadelphia	9–13	10–12–1	9–13	3–19	3–19	—	9–13	7–15
Pittsburgh	17–5	11–11	11–11	14–8	9–13	13–9	—	12–10
St. Louis	13–9–1	12–10	10–12	12–10	7–14	15–7	10–12	—

=== Roster ===
1923 New York Giants
Roster
Pitchers: Jesse Barnes; Virgil Barnes; Jack Bentley; Clint Blume; Dinty Gearin; Walt Huntzinger; Fred Johnson; Claude Jonnard; Red Lucas; Hugh McQuillan; Art Nehf; Rosy Ryan; Jack Scott; Rube Walberg; Mule Watson	Catchers: Alex Gaston; Hank Gowdy; Earl Smith; Frank Snyder; Infielders: Dave Bancroft; Frankie Frisch; Heinie Groh; Travis Jackson; George Kelly; Freddie Maguire; Bill Terry	Outfielders: Bill Cunningham; Irish Meusel; Jimmy O'Connell; Ralph Shinners; Mose Solomon; Casey Stengel; Hack Wilson; Ross Youngs	Manager: John McGraw; Coaches: Cozy Dolan; Hughie Jennings

== Player stats ==
=== Batting ===
==== Starters by position ====
Note: Pos = Position; G = Games played; AB = At bats; H = Hits; Avg. = Batting average; HR = Home runs; RBI = Runs batted in

Pos	Player	G	AB	H	Avg.	HR	RBI
C	Frank Snyder	120	402	103	.256	5	63
1B	High Pockets Kelly	145	560	172	.307	16	103
2B	Frankie Frisch	151	641	223	.348	12	111
SS	Dave Bancroft	107	444	135	.304	1	31
3B	Heinie Groh	123	465	135	.290	4	48
OF	Ross Youngs	152	596	200	.336	3	87
OF	Jimmy O'Connell	87	252	63	.250	6	39
OF	Irish Meusel	146	595	177	.297	19	125

==== Other batters ====
Note: G = Games played; AB = At bats; H = Hits; Avg. = Batting average; HR = Home runs; RBI = Runs batted in

Player	G	AB	H	Avg.	HR	RBI
Travis Jackson	96	327	90	.275	4	37
Casey Stengel	75	218	74	.339	5	43
Bill Cunningham	79	203	55	.271	5	27
Hank Gowdy	53	122	40	.328	1	18
Alex Gaston	22	39	8	.205	1	5
Earl Smith	24	34	7	.206	1	4
Freddie Maguire	41	30	6	.200	0	2
Ralph Shinners	33	13	2	.154	0	0
Hack Wilson	3	10	2	.200	0	0
Bill Terry	3	7	1	.143	0	0
Mose Solomon	2	8	3	.375	0	1

=== Pitching ===
==== Starting pitchers ====
Note: G = Games pitched; IP = Innings pitched; W = Wins; L = Losses; ERA = Earned run average; SO = Strikeouts

Player	G	IP	W	L	ERA	SO
Hugh McQuillan	38	229.2	15	14	3.41	75
Jack Scott	40	220.0	16	7	3.89	79
Art Nehf	34	196.0	13	10	4.50	50
Jack Bentley	31	183.0	13	8	4.48	80
Mule Watson	17	108.1	8	5	3.41	26

==== Other pitchers ====
Note: G = Games pitched; IP = Innings pitched; W = Wins; L = Losses; ERA = Earned run average; SO = Strikeouts

Player	G	IP	W	L	ERA	SO
Rosy Ryan	45	172.2	16	5	3.49	58
Jesse Barnes	12	36.0	3	1	6.25	12
Dinty Gearin	6	24.0	1	1	3.38	9
Fred Johnson	3	17.0	2	0	4.24	5
Walt Huntzinger	2	8.0	0	1	7.88	2

==== Relief pitchers ====
Note: G = Games pitched; W = Wins; L = Losses; SV = Saves; ERA = Earned run average; SO = Strikeouts

Player	G	W	L	SV	ERA	SO
Claude Jonnard	45	4	3	5	3.28	45
Virgil Barnes	22	2	3	1	3.91	6
Clint Blume	12	2	0	0	3.75	2
Red Lucas	3	0	0	1	0.00	3
Rube Walberg	2	0	0	0	1.80	1

== 1923 World Series ==
=== Game 1 ===
October 10, 1923, at Yankee Stadium in New York City

Team	1	2	3	4	5	6	7	8	9	R	H	E
New York (N)	0	0	4	0	0	0	0	0	1	5	8	0
New York (A)	1	2	0	0	0	0	1	0	0	4	12	1
W: Rosy Ryan (1–0) L: Bullet Joe Bush (0–1)
HR: NYG – Casey Stengel (1)

=== Game 2 ===
October 11, 1923, at the Polo Grounds (IV) in New York City

Team	1	2	3	4	5	6	7	8	9	R	H	E
New York (A)	0	1	0	2	1	0	0	0	0	4	10	0
New York (N)	0	1	0	0	0	1	0	0	0	2	9	2
W: Herb Pennock (1–0) L: Hugh McQuillan (0–1)
HR: NYY – Aaron Ward (1), Babe Ruth (1), Babe Ruth (2) NYG – Irish Meusel (1)

=== Game 3 ===
October 12, 1923, at Yankee Stadium in New York City

Team	1	2	3	4	5	6	7	8	9	R	H	E
New York (N)	0	0	0	0	0	0	1	0	0	1	4	0
New York (A)	0	0	0	0	0	0	0	0	0	0	6	1
W: Art Nehf (1–0) L: Sad Sam Jones (0–1)
HR: NYG – Casey Stengel (2)

=== Game 4 ===
October 13, 1923, at the Polo Grounds (IV) in New York City

Team	1	2	3	4	5	6	7	8	9	R	H	E
New York (A)	0	6	1	1	0	0	0	0	0	8	13	1
New York (N)	0	0	0	0	0	0	0	3	1	4	13	1
W: Bob Shawkey (1–0) L: Jack Scott (0–1) S: Herb Pennock (1)
HR: NYG – Ross Youngs (1)

=== Game 5 ===
October 14, 1923, at Yankee Stadium in New York City

Team	1	2	3	4	5	6	7	8	9	R	H	E
New York (N)	0	1	0	0	0	0	0	0	0	1	3	2
New York (A)	3	4	0	1	0	0	0	0	x	8	14	0
W: Bullet Joe Bush (1–1) L: Jack Bentley (0–1)
HR: NYY – Joe Dugan (1)

=== Game 6 ===
October 15, 1923, at the Polo Grounds (IV) in New York City

Team	1	2	3	4	5	6	7	8	9	R	H	E
New York (A)	1	0	0	0	0	0	0	5	0	6	5	0
New York (N)	1	0	0	1	1	1	0	0	0	4	10	1
W: Herb Pennock (2–0) L: Art Nehf (1–1) S: Sad Sam Jones (1)
HR: NYY – Babe Ruth (3), NYG – Frank Snyder (1)
