= Gus Felix =

American baseball player (1895-1960)

- Outfielder
- Born: May 24, 1895; Cincinnati, Ohio, U.S.
- Died: May 12, 1960 (aged 64); Montgomery, Alabama, U.S.
- Batted: Right Threw: Right

MLB debut
- April 19, 1923, for the Boston Braves

Last MLB appearance
- October 1, 1927, for the Brooklyn Robins

MLB statistics
- Batting average: .274
- Home runs: 12
- Runs batted in: 230
- Stats at Baseball Reference

Teams
- Boston Braves (1923–1925); Brooklyn Robins (1926–1927)

August Guenther Felix (May 24, 1895 – May 12, 1960) was an American former professional baseball outfielder. He played in Major League Baseball (MLB) for the Boston Braves and Brooklyn Robins between 1923 and 1927.
