= Ernie Padgett =

American baseball player (1899–1957)

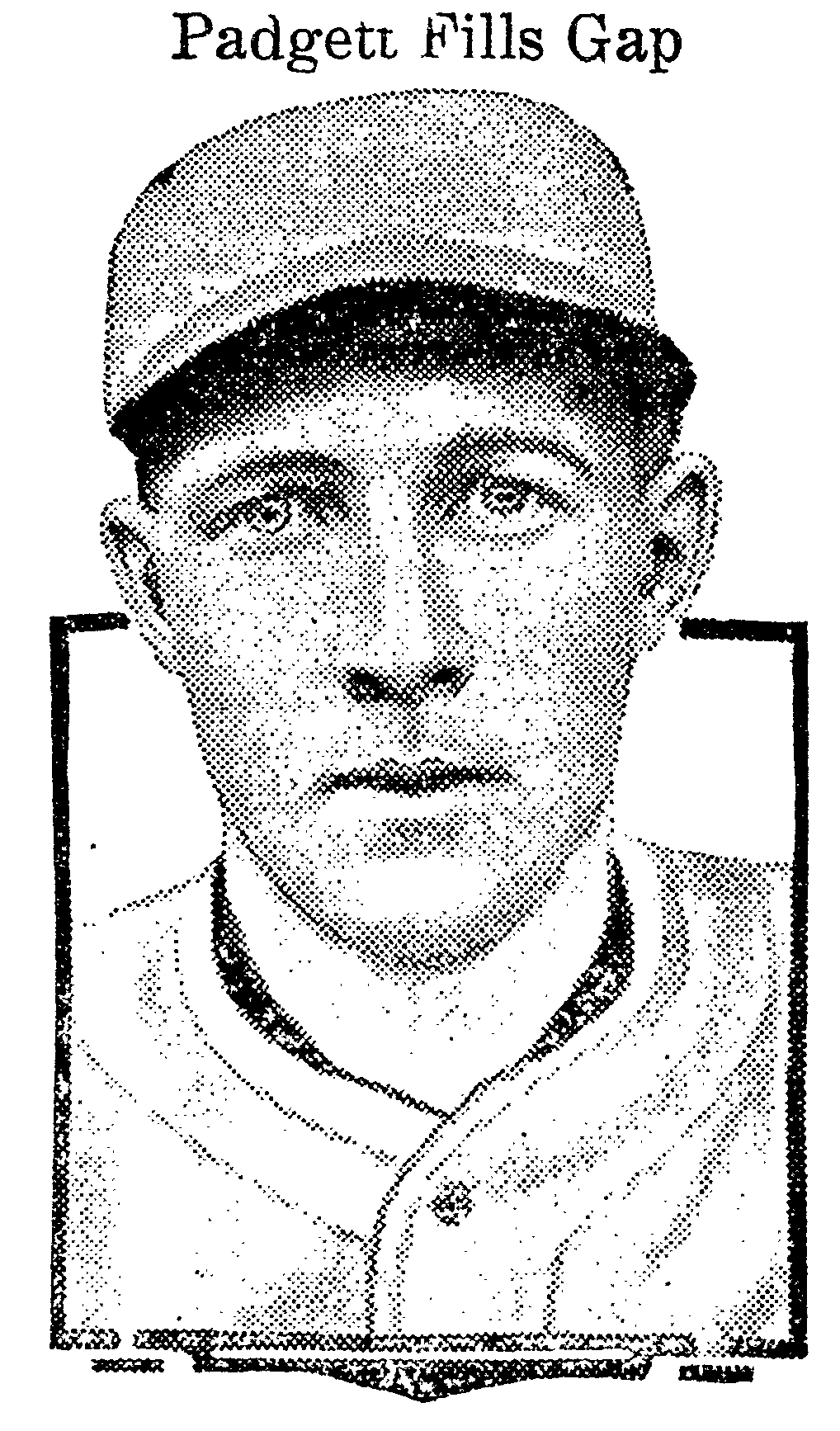
- Infielder
- Born: March 1, 1899; Philadelphia, Pennsylvania, U.S.
- Died: April 15, 1957 (aged 58); East Orange, New Jersey, U.S.
- Batted: Right Threw: Right

MLB debut
- October 3, 1923, for the Boston Braves

Last MLB appearance
- July 30, 1927, for the Cleveland Indians

MLB statistics
- Batting average: .266
- Home runs: 1
- Runs batted in: 81
- Stats at Baseball Reference

Teams
- Boston Braves (1923–1925); Cleveland Indians (1926–1927)

Career highlights and awards
- Unassisted triple play (October 6, 1923)

Ernest Kitchen Padgett (March 1, 1899 – April 15, 1957) was an American professional baseball infielder who played five seasons in Major League Baseball (MLB). Nicknamed "Red", he played for the Boston Braves and the Cleveland Indians from 1923 to 1927. He batted and threw right-handed. Although he primarily played as a third baseman, Padgett was utilized at shortstop and second base as well.

Padgett played minor league baseball for the Memphis Chicks of the Southern Association until 1922, when he was drafted by the Boston Braves in that year's Rule 5 draft. After making his debut in 1923 and spending three seasons with the Braves, Padgett's contract was purchased by the Cleveland Indians, where he spent the next two years of his career before playing his last game on July 30, 1927. He died on April 15, 1957, in East Orange, New Jersey. Padgett is best known for turning the fourth unassisted triple play in Major League Baseball history on October 6, 1923.

== Personal life ==
Padgett was born on March 1, 1899, in Philadelphia. He became a foreman at a manufacturing company after he retired from baseball in 1930. He was married to Edith. Together, they had one son, Joseph, who was fatally injured in 1937 while playing basketball, and a daughter Norma Seme who passed away in 2016, and her children Joseph Seme, Daniel Seme Jr., David Seme and Janine Newman. Edith joined the WAAC as a private in 1942. This is because she felt she would be symbolically taking their deceased son's place, as he would have been twenty-one years old and thus eligible for conscription into the army. Before reporting for duty, Edith taught Ernie how to cook. When asked which one was more challenging to accomplish, Padgett joked that making an unassisted triple play was "much easier than making a soufflé."

== Professional career ==
=== Draft and minor leagues ===
Padgett began his career for the Memphis Chicks, a minor league baseball team that were members of the Southern Association. He played for the team until 1922, when he was drafted in that season's Rule 5 draft by the Boston Braves. He made his major league debut for the Braves on October 3, 1923, at the age of 24, entering the game as a pinch-hitter for pitcher Joe Oeschger.

=== Boston Braves (1923–1925) ===
In just the second game of his major league career (as well as the Braves' final game of the 1923 season), Padgett achieved baseball history when he executed the fourth unassisted triple play on October 6, doing so against the Philadelphia Phillies. In the fourth inning of the game, Padgett, playing shortstop, caught Walter Holke's line drive, stepped on second base to retire Cotton Tierney, and then tagged outfielder Cliff Lee before he was able to return to first base. Although this was the fourth unassisted triple play in the MLB, it was the first recognized triple play to be accomplished in the National League (even though Paul Hines is sometimes credited with being the first to turn an unassisted triple play back in 1878, his play has been labeled "dubious" and would not have been considered unassisted even by 19th century rules).

In the following season, Padgett was involved in an arguable lineup substitution during a May 17 game against the Cincinnati Reds. After being drilled in the head by a pitch, Padgett was permitted by the umpires to have a pinch runner replace him while he sat out and recuperated from his dizziness. However, he was allowed to return to the game and play. This substitution, which was known as utilizing a "courtesy runner", is now banned under Rule 3.04 of the official rules of the MLB.

The 1924 season turned out to be Padgett's most complete season, resulting in many personal bests. He played 138 games and amassed 128 hits, 25 doubles, 9 triples, 46 runs batted in and hit the only home run in his career. Defensively, his fielding percentage of .967 was the third highest amongst all third basemen in the league. However, Padgett also had the fourth highest number of strikeouts in the league with 56.

Though he raised his batting average to a career high of .305 in 1925, Padgett was limited to just 86 games that year. At the end of the season, the Cleveland Indians purchased his contract from the Braves for cash only, with no players exchanged in the transaction.

=== Cleveland Indians (1926–1927) ===
Padgett arrived in Cleveland and served as the temporary replacement for the injured Johnny Hodapp, who suffered from sprained ankle at the time. However, his playing time was extremely limited, as he appeared in only 36 games for the Indians that season. In 1927, he featured in just 7 games before being released by the organization on July 30. Padgett had spent only five seasons in the Majors.

=== Back to the minors ===
Padgett returned to minor league baseball, joining the New Orleans Pelicans of the Southern Association. He spent two seasons playing for the team and was considered an offensive and defensive upgrade for the Pelicans. Padgett was granted an unconditional release in 1930, whereupon he joined the Charlotte Hornets, who were ranked as Class B in the South Atlantic League. In the middle of that season, he signed with the Reading Keystones of the International League and played for them for the remainder of the year before retiring completely from baseball.
