= Jocko Conlon =

American baseball player (1897-1987)

- Infielder
- Born: December 10, 1897; Woburn, Massachusetts, U.S.
- Died: August 5, 1987 (aged 89); Falmouth, Massachusetts, U.S.
- Batted: Right Threw: Right

MLB debut
- April 17, 1923, for the Boston Braves

Last MLB appearance
- October 6, 1923, for the Boston Braves

MLB statistics
- Games played: 59
- Hits: 32
- Batting average: .218
- Home runs: 0
- Runs batted in: 17
- Stats at Baseball Reference

Teams
- Boston Braves (1923)

Arthur Joseph "Jocko" Conlon (December 10, 1897 – August 5, 1987) was an American professional baseball player for the Boston Braves in Major League Baseball. Conlon was an alumnus of Harvard College, class of 1922, where he captained the Crimson baseball team.

Baseball Reference lists no minor league statistics for Conlon; his one season in professional baseball was spent in MLB with the Braves.

After his brief baseball career, Conlon became a businessman.
