= 1923 Brooklyn Robins season =

1923 Brooklyn Robins
- League: National League
- Ballpark: Ebbets Field
- City: Brooklyn, New York
- Record: 76–78 (.494)
- League place: 6th
- Owners: Charles Ebbets, Ed McKeever, Stephen McKeever
- President: Charles Ebbets
- Managers: Wilbert Robinson

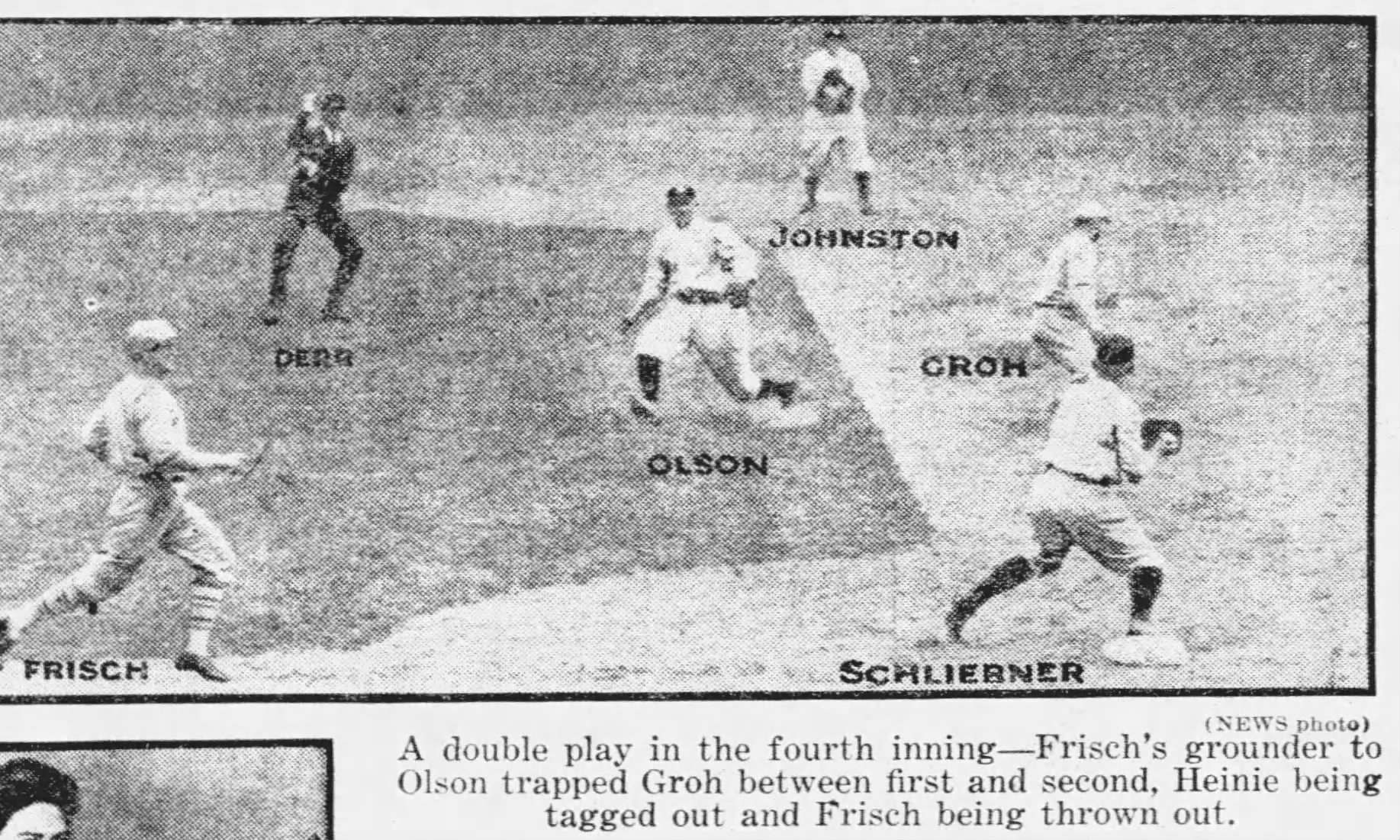

A poor season found the 1923 Brooklyn Robins in sixth place once more.

== Offseason ==
- January 2, 1923: Turner Barber was purchased by the Robins from the Chicago Cubs.
- February 11, 1923: Clarence Mitchell was traded by the Robins to the Philadelphia Phillies for George Smith.
- February 15, 1923: Hy Myers and Ray Schmandt were traded by the Robins to the St. Louis Cardinals for Jack Fournier.

== Regular season ==
=== Season standings ===
National League
Team	W	L	Pct.	GB	Home	Road
New York Giants	95	58	.621	—	47‍–‍30	48‍–‍28
Cincinnati Reds	91	63	.591	4½	46‍–‍32	45‍–‍31
Pittsburgh Pirates	87	67	.565	8½	47‍–‍30	40‍–‍37
Chicago Cubs	83	71	.539	12½	46‍–‍31	37‍–‍40
St. Louis Cardinals	79	74	.516	16	42‍–‍35	37‍–‍39
Brooklyn Robins	76	78	.494	19½	37‍–‍40	39‍–‍38
Boston Braves	54	100	.351	41½	22‍–‍55	32‍–‍45
Philadelphia Phillies	50	104	.325	45½	20‍–‍55	30‍–‍49

=== Record vs. opponents ===
1923 National League record Sources:
Team	BSN	BRO	CHC	CIN	NYG	PHI	PIT	STL
Boston	—	8–14	6–16	7–15	6–16	13–9	5–17	9–13–1
Brooklyn	14–8	—	10–12	8–14	11–11	12–10–1	11–11	10–12
Chicago	16–6	12–10	—	9–13	10–12	13–9	11–11	12–10
Cincinnati	15–7	14–8	13–9	—	12–10	19–3	8–14	10–12
New York	16–6	11–11	12–10	10–12	—	19–3	13–9	14–7
Philadelphia	9–13	10–12–1	9–13	3–19	3–19	—	9–13	7–15
Pittsburgh	17–5	11–11	11–11	14–8	9–13	13–9	—	12–10
St. Louis	13–9–1	12–10	10–12	12–10	7–14	15–7	10–12	—

=== Roster ===
1923 Brooklyn Robins
Roster
Pitchers: Leon Cadore; Art Decatur; Leo Dickerman; Burleigh Grimes; Harry Harper; Dutch Henry; Al Mamaux; Dutch Ruether; Paul Schreiber; Harry Shriver; George Smith; Dazzy Vance	Catchers: Eddie Ainsmith; Hank DeBerry; Charlie Hargreaves; Bernie Hungling; Zack Taylor; Infielders: Moe Berg; Jack Fournier; Ray French; Andy High; Jimmy Johnston; Bill McCarren; Billy Mullen; Ivy Olson; Dutch Schliebner; Stuffy Stewart	Outfielders: Gene Bailey; Turner Barber; Bert Griffith; Tommy Griffith; Bernie Neis; Zack Wheat	Manager: Wilbert Robinson

=== Notable transactions ===
- May 17, 1923: Dutch Schliebner was traded by the Robins to the St. Louis Browns for Dutch Henry and cash.

== Player stats ==
=== Batting ===
==== Starters by position and other batters ====
Pitchers batting stats included.

Note: Pos = Position; G = Games played; AB = At bats; H = Hits; Avg. = Batting average; HR = Home runs; RBI = Runs batted in

Pos	Player	G	AB	H	Avg.	HR	RBI
C	Zack Taylor	96	337	97	.288	0	46
1B	Jack Fournier	133	515	181	.351	22	102
2B	Jimmy Johnston	151	625	203	.325	4	60
3B	Andy High	123	426	115	.270	3	37
SS	Moe Berg	49	129	24	.186	0	6
OF	Bernie Neis	126	445	122	.274	5	37
OF	Tommy Griffith	131	481	141	.293	8	66
OF	Gene Bailey	127	411	109	.265	1	42
OF	Zack Wheat	98	349	131	.375	8	65
2B	Ivy Olson	82	292	76	.260	1	35
OF	Bert Griffith	79	248	73	.294	2	37
C	Hank DeBerry	78	235	67	.285	1	48
3B	Bill McCarren	69	216	53	.245	3	27
1B	Dutch Schliebner	19	76	19	.250	0	4
SS	Ray French	43	73	16	.219	0	7
C	Charlie Hargreaves	20	57	16	.281	0	4
OF	Turner Barber	13	46	10	.217	0	8
2B	Stuffy Stewart	4	11	4	.364	1	1
3B	Billy Mullen	4	11	3	.273	0	0
C	Eddie Ainsmith	2	10	2	.200	0	2
C	Bernie Hungling	2	4	0	.000	0	0
P	Burleigh Grimes	40	126	30	.238	0	15
P	Dutch Ruether	49	117	32	.274	0	10
P	Dazzy Vance	37	83	7	.084	1	1
P	Leo Dickerman	35	52	13	.250	2	9
P	Dutch Henry	17	35	8	.229	0	1
P	George Smith	25	26	5	.192	0	2
P	Art Decatur	36	21	0	.000	0	0
P	Leon Cadore	9	13	1	.077	0	1
P	Paul Schreiber	9	2	0	.000	0	1
P	Al Mamaux	5	2	1	.500	0	0
P	Harry Harper	1	1	0	.000	0	0
P	Harry Shriver	1	1	0	.000	0	0

=== Pitching ===
==== Starting pitchers ====
Note: G = Games pitched; IP = Innings pitched; W = Wins; L = Losses; ERA = Earned run average; SO = Strikeouts

Player	G	IP	W	L	ERA	SO
Burleigh Grimes	39	327.0	21	18	3.58	119
Dazzy Vance	37	280.1	18	15	3.50	197
Dutch Ruether	34	275.0	15	14	4.22	87
Harry Shriver	1	4.0	0	0	6.75	1
Harry Harper	1	3.2	0	1	14.73	4

==== Other pitchers ====
Note: G = Games pitched; IP = Innings pitched; W = Wins; L = Losses; ERA = Earned run average; SO = Strikeouts

Player	G	IP	W	L	ERA	SO
Leo Dickerman	35	159.2	8	12	3.72	58
Dutch Henry	17	94.1	4	6	3.91	28
George Smith	25	91.0	3	6	3.66	15
Leon Cadore	8	36.0	4	1	3.25	5
Al Mamaux	5	13.0	0	2	8.31	5

==== Relief pitchers ====
Note: G = Games pitched; W = Wins; L = Losses; SV = Saves; ERA = Earned run average; SO = Strikeouts

Player	G	W	L	SV	ERA	SO
Art Decatur	36	3	3	3	2.58	25
Paul Schreiber	9	0	0	1	4.20	4
