= 1923 in baseball =

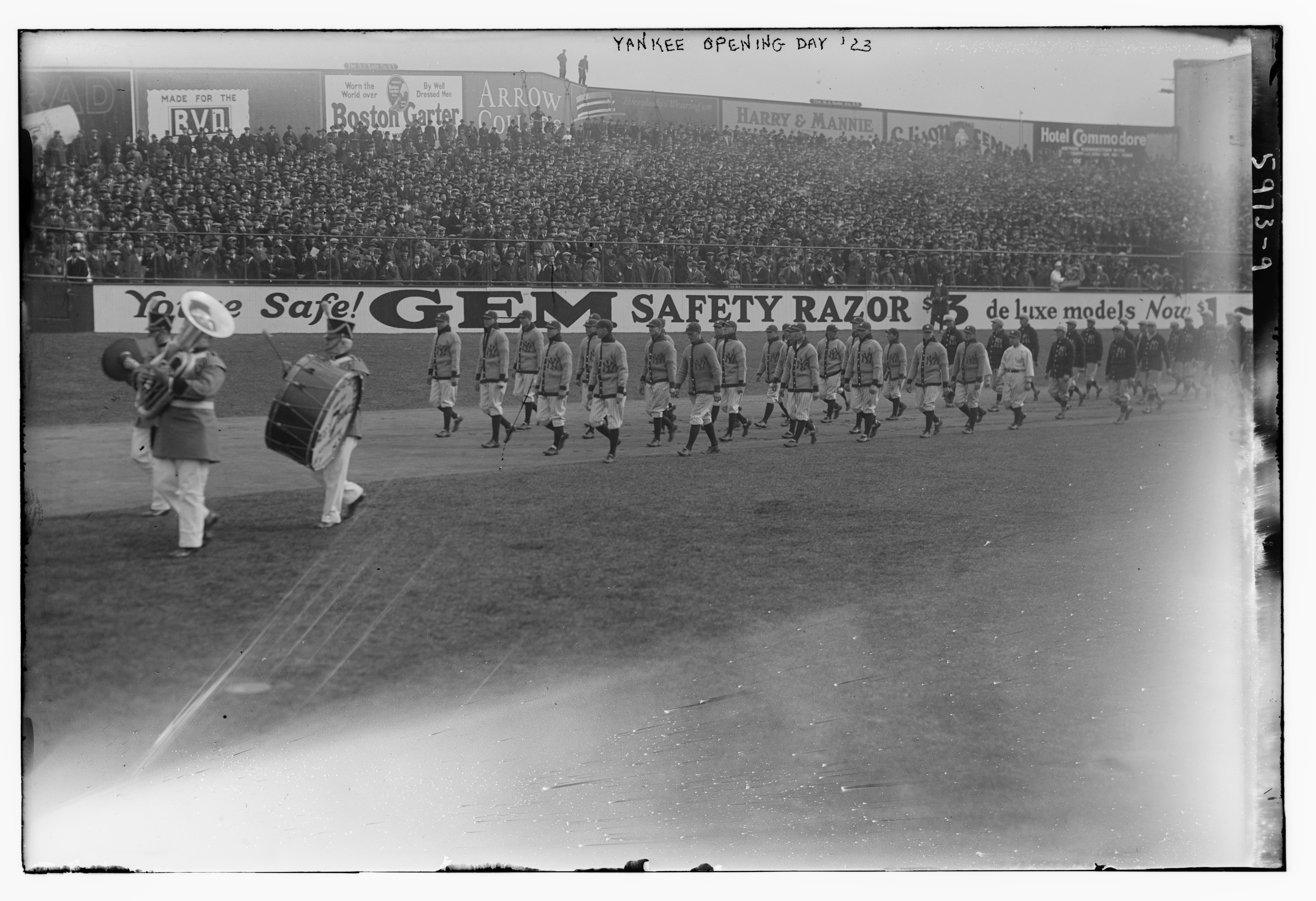
New York Yankees opening day

The following are the baseball events of the year 1923 throughout the world.

== Champions ==
- World Series: New York Yankees over New York Giants (4–2)

== Awards and honors ==
- League Award
  - Babe Ruth, New York Yankees, OF

== Statistical leaders ==
Any team shown in small text indicates a previous team a player was on during the season.

	American League		National League		Eastern Colored League		Negro National League	
Stat	Player	Total	Player	Total	Player	Total	Player	Total
AVG	Harry Heilmann (DET)	.403	Rogers Hornsby (STL)	.384	Biz Mackey (HIL)	.423	Heavy Johnson^{1} (KCM)	.406
HR	Babe Ruth (NYY)	41	Cy Williams (PHI)	41	George Johnson (HIL)	8	Heavy Johnson^{1} (KCM); Candy Jim Taylor (SLS/TOL)	20
RBI	Babe Ruth (NYY); Tris Speaker (CLE)	130	Irish Meusel (NYG)	125	George Johnson (HIL)	46	Heavy Johnson^{1} (KCM)	120
W	George Uhle (CLE)	26	Dolf Luque (CIN)	27	Rats Henderson (BG); Nip Winters (HIL)	10	Bullet Rogan (KCM)	16
ERA	Stan Coveleski (CLE)	2.76	Dolf Luque (CIN)	1.93	Nip Winters (HIL)	2.36	Ed Rile (CAG)	2.53
K	Walter Johnson (WSH)	130	Dazzy Vance (BRO)	197	Rats Henderson (HG)	100	Bullet Rogan (KCM)	151

^{1} Negro National National League Triple Crown batting winner

== Major league baseball final standings ==
=== American League final standings ===
American League
Team	W	L	Pct.	GB	Home	Road
New York Yankees	98	54	.645	—	46‍–‍30	52‍–‍24
Detroit Tigers	83	71	.539	16	45‍–‍32	38‍–‍39
Cleveland Indians	82	71	.536	16½	42‍–‍36	40‍–‍35
Washington Senators	75	78	.490	23½	43‍–‍34	32‍–‍44
St. Louis Browns	74	78	.487	24	40‍–‍36	34‍–‍42
Philadelphia Athletics	69	83	.454	29	34‍–‍41	35‍–‍42
Chicago White Sox	69	85	.448	30	30‍–‍45	39‍–‍40
Boston Red Sox	61	91	.401	37	37‍–‍40	24‍–‍51

Locations of teams for the 1923–1931 American League seasons
American League

=== National League final standings ===
National League
Team	W	L	Pct.	GB	Home	Road
New York Giants	95	58	.621	—	47‍–‍30	48‍–‍28
Cincinnati Reds	91	63	.591	4½	46‍–‍32	45‍–‍31
Pittsburgh Pirates	87	67	.565	8½	47‍–‍30	40‍–‍37
Chicago Cubs	83	71	.539	12½	46‍–‍31	37‍–‍40
St. Louis Cardinals	79	74	.516	16	42‍–‍35	37‍–‍39
Brooklyn Robins	76	78	.494	19½	37‍–‍40	39‍–‍38
Boston Braves	54	100	.351	41½	22‍–‍55	32‍–‍45
Philadelphia Phillies	50	104	.325	45½	20‍–‍55	30‍–‍49

Locations of teams for the 1920–1931 National League seasons
National League

== Negro leagues final standings ==
All Negro leagues standings below are per MLB and Seamheads.

=== Eastern Colored League final standings ===
vs. Eastern Colored League						vs. Major Black teams			
Eastern Colored League	W	L	T	Pct.	GB	W	L	T	Pct.
Hilldale Club	34	20	1	.627	—	40	21	1	.653
Cuban Stars (East)	24	17	0	.585	3½	24	17	0	.585
Brooklyn Royal Giants	17	18	1	.486	7½	17	18	1	.486
Atlantic City Bacharach Giants	21	24	1	.467	8½	28	30	1	.483
New York Lincoln Giants	16	21	0	.432	9½	18	23	0	.439
Baltimore Black Sox	19	31	1	.382	13	23	35	1	.398

Locations of teams for the 1923 Eastern Colored League season
Eastern Colored League
Traveling team: Cuban Stars (East)

=== Negro National League final standings ===
vs. Negro National League					vs. Major Black teams			
Negro National League	W	L	Pct.	GB	W	L	T	Pct.
Kansas City Monarchs	59	36	.621	—	61	37	0	.622
Chicago American Giants	42	29	.592	5	48	29	1	.622
Indianapolis ABCs	46	32	.590	4½	51	33	0	.607
Detroit Stars	39	28	.582	6	41	30	0	.577
Cuban Stars (West)	24	33	.421	16	27	35	0	.435
St. Louis Stars	29	43	.403	18½	32	48	1	.401
Toledo Tigers†	10	17	.370	15	10	17	0	.370
Milwaukee Bears	11	42	.208	27	14	52	1	.216

†Toledo Tigers folded in July. The independent Cleveland Tate Stars returned to the NNL as an associate member to finish the Tigers' schedule. The team was not considered a full member of the NNL.

Locations of teams for the 1923 Negro National League season
Negro National League
Traveling team: Cuban Stars (West)

=== Independent teams final standings ===
A loose confederation of teams existed that were not part of either established leagues.

vs. All Teams
Independent Clubs	W	L	T	Pct.	GB
Memphis Red Sox	15	7	0	.682	—
Cleveland Tate Stars	15	16	1	.484	4½
Harrisburg Giants	6	7	0	.462	4½
Washington Potomacs	14	20	0	.412	7
Birmingham Black Barons	16	25	4	.400	8½

== Events ==
=== January ===
- January 3 – The New York Yankees selects two rookies from the Boston Red Sox; pitcher George Pipgras and outfielder Harvey Hendrick in exchange for backup catcher Al DeVormer. Then 27 days later, the Red Sox continue to feed the Yankees by sending them pitcher Herb Pennock for infielder Norm McMillan, outfielder Camp Skinner, pitcher George Murray, and $50,000 cash.

=== February ===
- February 2 – Red Schoendienst is born in Germantown, Illinois. Primarily a second baseman, Schoendienst will hit .289 during a 19-year career with the St. Louis Cardinals, New York Giants and Milwaukee Braves. He will win election to the Hall of Fame in 1989.
- February 20 – Christy Mathewson, along with Emil Fuchs, purchase the Boston Braves franchise for $300,000. Matthews is named team president, though failing health reduces Matthewson's role to just a figurehead and he turns over the role of team president to Fuchs at the end of the season.

=== March ===
- March 6 – The St. Louis Cardinals announce that their players will wear numerals on their uniforms and number them according to the batting order, but it does not happen this season.
- March 8 – Pitcher Rube Benton is reinstated by Commissioner Landis even though Benton admitted to having prior knowledge regarding the 1919 world Series fix.

=== April ===
- April 3 – Swede Risberg and Happy Felsch sue the Chicago White Sox seeking back salary and an addition $400,000 in damages. Though acquitted on charges they fixed the 1919 World Series, both players were banned for life.
- April 7 – The longest National League opener (to date) took place with the Brooklyn Dodgers and Philadelphia Phillies battling head-to-head for a grueling, fourteen innings and a 5–5 tie.
- April 18 – The New York Yankees defeat the Boston Red Sox, 4–1, in the very first game at old Yankee Stadium. In the third inning, Babe Ruth hits the stadium's first-ever home run, a shot off Howard Ehmke with Whitey Witt and Joe Dugan on base.
- April 20 – In a 5–3 loss to the St. Louis Browns, Detroit Tigers future Hall of Famer Heinie Manush makes his major league debut, and hits a double in his only at-bat.
- April 23 – The New York Yankees sign first baseman Lou Gehrig

=== May ===
- May 2 – Washington Senators pitcher Walter Johnson gets his 100th career shutout and New York Yankees shortstop Everett Scott gets a gold medal from the American League for playing in his 1,000th consecutive game. Scott began his streak on June 20, 1916. Washington defeats the Yankees, 3–0, as Johnson allows just three hits.
- May 11:
  - The Philadelphia Phillies and the St. Louis Cardinals bash a game-record 10 home runs, as the Phillies beat the Cardinals, 20–14. Cy Williams hit three homers with seven RBI for Philadelphia, while teammate Johnny Mokan adds two homers, a double, and seven RBI. Besides, Les Mann belts two homers for St. Louis‚ and losing pitcher Bill Sherdel connects one. Overall, 23 batters hit safely with the two teams combining for 79 total bases. Williams now has 12 home runs, which tops the Major Leagues.
  - In Pacific League action, Vernon Tigers outfielder Pete Schneider collects five home runs, including two grand slams and 14 runs batted in, in a 35–11 victory over the Salt Lake Bees. Vernon also adds a double that hits two feet from the top of the center field wall. A former Major League pitcher, Vernon won 20 games for the Cincinnati Reds in its 1917 season, while his five homers and 14 RBI, settled records in the Pacific League that still stands today.
- May 12 – The St. Louis Browns sell the contract of pitcher Sloppy Thurston to the Chicago White Sox.
- May 13 – Joe Sewell of the Cleveland Indians strikes out twice in one game for the first time in his career. Washington Senators rookie Cy Warmoth is the pitcher. In a 14-year career, Sewell will have only one other multiple strikeout game.
- May 18 – Benny Bengough makes his major league debut for the New York Yankees in their 9–4 win over the St. Louis Browns. Bengough would serve as a back-up catcher on the Yankees 1927 Murders Row team.
- May 19 – For the first time in major league history, brothers on opposite teams hit home runs in the same game. Boston Red Sox catcher Rick Ferrell homers off his brother Wes Ferrell in the second inning, but the Cleveland Indians pitcher returns the favor as he homers in the third on a pitch called by his sibling. It is the only time that the Ferrell brothers homer in the same game.
- May 25 – Detroit Tigers legend Ty Cobb scored his 1,741 run to pass another legend, Pittsburgh Pirates' Honus Wagner. Cobb went on to hold ninety separate Major League records when he retired in 1928.

=== June ===
- June 1 – Heinie Groh, Ross Youngs and Jimmie O'Connell collects five hits apiece, a first in the 20th century, as the New York Giants score in all nine innings, setting also a Major League record, while beating the Philadelphia Phillies 22–8 at Baker Bowl. It has been done only once since in the National League by the St. Louis Cardinals (September 13,‚1964), but never in the American League. O'Connell hit three doubles, one home run‚and a single in his five safeties, good for seven runs batted in. Pitcher Claude Jonnard is credited with the win.
- June 3 – After pitching a complete game the day before, Detroit Tigers Herman Pillette relieves in the 8th inning against the Cleveland Indians with Detroit up, 7–5. Pillette allows both inherited runners to score, but the Tigers tally a run in the bottom of the 9th to give him his second win in two days.
- June 7 – The Boston Braves trade Hank Gowdy and Mule Watson to the New York Giants in exchange for Earl Smith and Jesse Barnes.
- June 15 – After going two-for-four with a double, two runs batted in and a run scored, New York Yankees star first baseman Wally Pipp is rested by manager Miller Huggins, allowing recently signed rookie Lou Gehrig to make his major league debut in the Yankees' 10–0 victory over the St. Louis Browns. Gehrig does not receive an at bat.
- June 23 through July 22 – The Cleveland Indians play 31 consecutive home games against the other American League teams, finishing their homestand with a 16–15 record.
- June 26 – Moe Berg, who would go on to be a spy for the United States during World War II, is signed by the Brooklyn Robins as a free agent.
- June 27 - One day after signing as a free agent, Moe Berg makes his MLB debut at shortstop for the Brooklyn Robins. Berg gets one hit in two at bats as the Robins route the Philadelphia Phillies 15-5.

=== July ===
- July 2 – Already down 7–0 to the St. Louis Browns, future Hall of Fame pitcher Ted Lyons makes his major league debut with the Chicago White Sox, and throws a perfect inning.
- July 7 – In the first game of a double header at Dunn Field, the Cleveland Indians set an American League record after scoring in every inning against the Boston Red Sox. The feat was completed in eight innings (the home team did not bat in the ninth). The Indians collected 24 hits and 14 walks, while scoring 13 runs in the sixth inning for an embarrassing 27–3 victory. Cleveland win the second game as well, 8–5.
- July 10 – In a doubleheader, St. Louis Cardinals rookie pitcher Johnny Stuart hurled two complete game victories over the Boston Braves, winning by scores of 11–1 and 6–3, while allowing three hits in the opener and 10 in the nightcap.
- July 11 – Harry Frazee, owner of the Boston Red Sox since 1916, sells the club for over $1 million to a group of Ohio businessmen. Veteran front office man Bob Quinn will run the Red Sox, and as team president he will work to restore the credibility of a franchise whose best players had been sold off by Frazee over the years.
- July 22 – Walter Johnson of the Washington Senators finds the 3,000 strikeout club.
- July 24 – New York Yankees pitcher Carl Mays beats the Philadelphia Athletics at Shibe Park, 9–2, setting an American League record with his 24th straight win. This also matches the Major League high of Christy Mathewson, who won 24 consecutive games in the National League.

=== August ===
- August 3 – All Major League Baseball games are postponed after the sudden death of U.S. President Warren G. Harding the night before.
- August 4 – Travis Jackson drives in eight runs on four hits to lead the New York Giants to a 14–4 victory over the Cincinnati Reds.
- August 13 – Pittsburgh Pirates outfielder Max Carey steals second base, third base and home plate against the Brooklyn Robins. Carey will again lead the National League with 51 stolen bases and, equally fleet in the field, will garner 450 putouts and 28 assists in the season. Besides, Carey becomes the first outfielder in the majors to catch 400 or more putouts six times. Richie Ashburn will later do it nine times.
- August 15 – Washington Senators left-hander George Mogridge becomes the only pitcher in Major League history to steal home in extra innings, when he scores an insurance run in the 12th in a 5–1 win over the Chicago White Sox at Comiskey Park.
- August 17 – The New York Yankees edge the St. Louis Browns at Sportsman's Park, 5–4. Babe Ruth hits his 31st home run in the 1st inning and adds a double in the 8th. After 111 games, Ruth is batting .401. He will wind up with his highest average at .393, leading the American League with 205 hits, 41 homers, 151 runs, a Major League record 170 walks, and will reach base a record 379 times en route to the AL MVP Award.

=== September ===
- September 4 – Sad Sam Jones pitches a no-hitter for the New York Yankees in a 2–0 win over the Philadelphia Athletics.
- September 7 – Boston Red Sox pitcher Howard Ehmke tosses a no-hitter in a 4–0 win over the Philadelphia Athletics, marking the second time in four days Philadelphia is no-hit.
- September 14 – Boston Red Sox first baseman George Burns completed the third unassisted triple play in Major League Baseball history during the second inning of a game against the Cleveland Indians, as he gathered in a Frank Brower line drive, tags Rube Lutzke coming from first base, and beat Riggs Stephenson while returning to second. Boston wins, 2–0.
- September 16 – A riot broke out at Wrigley Field after umpire Charley Moran made an out call at second base on Chicago Cubs' Sparky Adams. Commissioner Judge Kenesaw Mountain Landis was in attendance and shook his cane at the angry mob, as Moran and the other officials were pelted by hundreds of empty bottles. After holding up play for over fifteen minutes, the game resumed with the visiting New York Giants winning, 10–6.
- September 17 – George Kelly of the New York Giants sets a major-league record by hitting home runs in three consecutive innings (3rd, 4th and 5th) against Chicago Cubs pitcher Vic Aldridge, as New York rolls to a 13–6 win. Kelly adds a single and double to run his total bases to 15 for the game. Kelly has now hit a record six homers off cousin Aldridge this year, a mark off one pitcher that will be tied by Ted Williams in the 1941 season, off Johnny Rigney, and Ted Kluszewski in 1954, off Max Surkont.
- September 24 – Future Hall of Famer Bill Terry makes his major league debut with the New York Giants in a 6–3 loss to the Cincinnati Reds.
- September 28 – The New York Yankees defeat the Boston Red Sox by a difference of twenty runs at Fenway Park, 24–4.
- September 29 – Future Hall of Famer Hack Wilson makes his major league debut for the New York Giants in a 5–1 loss to the Brooklyn Dodgers.

=== October ===
- October 6 – In the fourth inning of the second game of a doubleheader, Boston Braves shortstop Ernie Padgett turns the fourth unassisted triple play in Major League history in a 4–1 Braves win over the Philadelphia Phillies.
- October 10 – Game One of the 1923 World Series is won by the New York Giants on a ninth inning inside-the-park home run by Casey Stengel.
- October 11 – The New York Yankees win their first World Series game against the New York Giants in nine tries on two home runs by Babe Ruth. Going back to the 1921 World Series, they were 0–8–1, with a tie game in the 1922 World Series.
- October 12 – A solo home run by Casey Stengel in the seventh inning is the only run of the third game of the World Series.
- October 13 – The Yankees get off to an 8–0 lead in game four of the World Series, and win it, 8–3.
- October 14 – Joe Dugan hits the second inside-the-park home run of the World Series, as the Yankees defeat the Giants, 8–1.
- October 15 – The New York Yankees defeat the New York Giants, 4–2, in Game 6 of the World Series to win their first World Championship, four games to two. The Yankees opened their new Yankee Stadium in April making it the third time that a team had inaugurated a new stadium with a World Series win. The three consecutive matchups between the Yankees and Giants (1921–1923) marked the only time, to date, that three straight World Series featured the same two clubs.

=== November ===
- November 12 – New York Giants owner and manager John McGraw trades outfielders Casey Stengel and Bill Cunningham along with shortstop Dave Bancroft to the Boston Braves in exchange for pitchers Joe Oeschger and Bill Southworth.

=== December ===
- December 9 - On a train heading to the winter meetings, baseball executive George Weiss swaps berths with "Wild Bill" Donovan, a former major league pitcher and manager. The decision proves fateful, as the train, a 20th Century Limited, crashes. Wiess survives the crash, and Donovan is killed. William F. Baker, the owner of the Philadelphia Phillies, is also on the train, but manages to emerged unscathed.
- December 11 – Pitcher Carl Mays is purchased by the Cincinnati Reds from the New York Yankees.
- December 13 – Boston Braves acquire second baseman Cotton Tierney from the Philadelphia Phillies in exchange for shortstop Hod Ford and outfielder Ray Powell, who is later replaced by outfielder Al Nixon.

== Births ==
=== January ===
- January 3 – John André
- January 5 – Johnny Ritchey
- January 6 – Red Hardy
- January 8 – Ray Flanigan
- January 11 – Frank Fanovich
- January 14 – Ken Johnson
- January 16 – Dick Sipek
- January 20 – Elizabeth Emry
- January 23 – Cot Deal
- January 30 – Walt Dropo

=== February ===
- February 2 – Red Schoendienst
- February 3 – Edith Barney
- February 5 – Chuck Diering
- February 16 – Ribs Raney
- February 17 – Dorothy Ferguson
- February 17 – Bill Sommers
- February 19 – Russ Sullivan
- February 20 – Walter McCoy
- February 22 – Anne Surkowski
- February 26 – Jean Ladd

=== March ===
- March 3 – Barney Martin
- March 7 – Bobo Holloman
- March 17 – Pat Seerey
- March 21 – Jim Hughes
- March 21 – Merle Keagle
- March 22 – George Crowe
- March 23 – Barney Koch
- March 24 – Zander Hollander

=== April ===
- April 7 – Lois Barker
- April 9 – Josephine Figlo
- April 11 – Scott Cary
- April 14 – Alonzo Perry
- April 17 – Solly Hemus
- April 20 – Philomena Gianfrancisco
- April 20 – Preston Gómez
- April 23 – Daniel Donahue
- April 23 – Alice Haylett
- April 23 – Sammy Meeks
- April 27 – Kite Thomas
- April 28 – Dolores Klosowski

=== May ===
- May 1 – Kay Blumetta
- May 5 – Jim Kirby
- May 6 – Earl Turner
- May 11 – Louise Arnold
- May 12 – Ed Lyons
- May 15 – Dale Matthewson
- May 18 – Don Lund
- May 20 – José Zardón
- May 21 – Alta Little
- May 23 – Jerry McCarthy
- May 28 – Bob Kuzava

=== June ===
- June 3 – Elma Steck
- June 8 – Hal Kleine
- June 11 – Jerre DeNoble
- June 16 – Allie Clark
- June 23 – Pablo García
- June 24 – Mel Hoderlein
- June 25 – Barney White
- June 27 – Gus Zernial

=== July ===
- July 7 – Ed Sanicki
- July 7 – Joe Smaza
- July 15 – Bruce Edwards
- July 15 – Marion Fricano
- July 16 – Len Okrie
- July 18 – Lorraine Borg
- July 21 – Paul Burris
- July 23 – Luis Aloma
- July 26 – Leo Thomas
- July 27 – Ray Boone
- July 30 – Paul Minner

=== August ===
- August 1 – George Bamberger
- August 9 – George Vico
- August 10 – Gary Gearhart
- August 10 – Pete Gebrian
- August 10 – Bob Porterfield
- August 17 – Tom Clyde
- August 17 – Duke Markell
- August 21 – Hilly Flitcraft
- August 27 – Don Grate

=== September ===
- September 17 – Les Peden
- September 17 – Bob Rothel
- September 18 – Joe Tepsic
- September 22 – Tom Wright
- September 23 – Dorothy Collins
- September 24 – Geraldine Guest
- September 26 – Elsie Wingrove

=== October ===
- October 3 – Joanne Overleese
- October 10 – Saul Rogovin
- October 11 – Martha Haines
- October 25 – Russ Meyer
- October 25 – Bobby Thomson
- October 26 – Tommy Glaviano
- October 28 – Thelma Grambo
- October 29 – John Mackinson

=== November ===
- November 9 – Ted Sepkowski
- November 10 – Cal Ermer
- November 11 – Lee Howard
- November 17 – Mike Garcia
- November 18 – Roy Wise
- November 24 – Danny Ozark
- November 25 – Archie Wilson
- November 27 – Bob Schultz

=== December ===
- December 4 – Dick Strahs
- December 5 – Eleanor Dapkus
- December 8 – Stan Landes
- December 13 – Larry Doby
- December 14 – Paul LaPalme
- December 15 – Bill Bonness
- December 19 – Vern Freiburger
- December 20 – Grant Dunlap
- December 22 – Bob Hall
- December 28 – Tony Daniels
- December 28 – Don Thompson
- December 30 – Harry Elliott

== Deaths ==
=== January–February ===
- January 1 – Willie Keeler, 50, Hall of Fame right fielder and prolific bunter who compiled a .341 lifetime batting average, two National League batting champion titles, batted over .370 from 1894 to 1899, including a .424 mark and record 44-game hitting streak for 1897 Orioles, while leading the league in singles seven times, hits three times and runs once, ranking second all-time in hits and runs upon retirement.
- January 22 – Fred Cooke, 49, outfielder for the 1897 Cleveland Spiders of the National League.
- January 25 – Nick Wise, 56, catcher/outfielder for the 1888 Boston Beaneaters of the National League.
- January 28 – John Meister, 59, infield/outfield utility for the New York Metropolitans of the American Association during the 1886–1887 seasons.
- February 4 – George Tebeau, 61, outfielder nicknamed ″White Wings″ for his blazing speed, who hit .269 and stole 228 bases in 627 games for four teams, and later became the owner of the Kansas City Blues American Association franchise.
- February 17 – George Meakim, 57, pitcher who played between 1890 and 1895 with the Louisville Colonels, Chicago Colts, Philadelphia Athletics and Cincinnati Reds.
- February 28 – Jim Britt, 67, pitcher who played from 1872 to 1873 for the Brooklyn Atlantics of the National Association.

=== March–April ===
- March 3 – Harry Clarke, 62, right fielder for the 1889 Washington Nationals of the National League.
- March 3 – Ducky Hemp, 60, outfielder for the Louisville Colonels, Pittsburgh Alleghenys and Stars between 1887 and 1890.
- March 15 – Pete Wood, 56, Canadian-born pitcher for the Buffalo Bisons in 1885 and the Philadelphia Quakers in 1889.
- March 15 – Goat Anderson, 43, outfielder for the 1907 Pittsburgh Pirates.
- March 17 – Mortimer Hogan, 61, outfielder for the Milwaukee Brewers, New York Metropolitans and Cleveland Blues between 1884 and 1888.
- April 10 – Jay Faatz, 62, first baseman for three teams, who also played and managed for the 1890 Buffalo Bisons of the Players' League in the 1890 season.
- April 10 – Jim Gill, 57, second baseman/centerfielder for the 1889 St. Louis Browns of the American Association.
- April 13 – Gene Krapp, 35, pitcher who played with the Cleveland Naps of the American League (1911–1912) and the Buffalo Buffeds/Blues of the Federal League (1914–1915).
- April 20 – Jack Lynch, 66, pitcher who posted a 110–105 record and a 3.69 ERA in 221 games for three teams, and a member of the New York Metropolitans team who won the American Association pennant in 1884.
- April 21 – Joe Ellick, 69, right fielder for four different teams and a player/manager for the Chicago Browns/Pittsburgh Stogies of the Union Association in 1884; later, umpired in the National League (1886) and American Association (1888–1889).
- April 27 – Paul Sentell, 43, infielder who played from 1906 to 1907 for the Philadelphia Phillies.

=== May–June ===
- May 23 – Willard Mains, 54, pitcher who posted a 16–17 record and a 3.53 ERA in parts of four seasons for the Chicago White Stockings, Cincinnati Kelly's Killers, Milwaukee Brewers and Boston Beaneaters.
- June 3 – Harry Billiard, 39, pitcher who played with the New York Highlanders (1908), Indianapolis Hoosiers/Newark Peppers (1914/1915).
- June 10 – Bill Annis, 66, outfielder for the 1884 Boston Beaneaters of the National League.
- June 11 – George Hall, 74, British-born outfielder who played from 1866 through 1877 for nine different teams, while hitting a .322 average in 365 career games and leading the National League in home runs in 1876.
- June 12 – Cliff Carroll, 63, outfielder who hit a .251 average in 991 games for six different teams between 1882 and 1893.
- June 19 – Tom Jones, 46, first baseman who hit .251 with 964 hits and 135 stolen bases for three American League teams between 1902 and 1910.
- June 21 – Claude Elliott, 46, pitcher who played from 1904 to 1905 for the Cincinnati Reds and New York Giants.
- June 21 – Bill Grevell, 25, pitcher for the 1919 Philadelphia Athletics of the American League.

=== July–August ===
- July 10 – Joe Stabell, [?], outfielder for the 1885 Buffalo Bisons of the National League.
- July 19 – Nate Kellogg, 64, shortstop who played briefly for the 1885 Detroit Wolverines of the National League.
- August 15 – Marty Hogan, 53, British-born outfielder who played from 1894 through 1895 for the Cincinnati Reds and St. Louis Browns of the National League.
- August 16 – Bill Day, 56, pitcher for the Philadelphia Quakers/Phillies and the Pittsburgh Alleghenys of the National League from 1889 to 1890.
- August 16 – Jim Scoggins, 32, pitcher for the 1913 Chicago White Sox of the American League.
- August 22 – Jay Budd, 57, left fielder who played one game in 1890 for the Cleveland Infants of the short-lived Players' League.
- August 29 – Jocko Milligan, 62, catcher/first baseman who played from 1884 to 1893 for six National League teams, most prominently with the Philadelphia Athletics.

=== September–October ===
- September 1 – Frank McManus, 48, catcher who played between 1899 and 1904 with the Washington Senators and Brooklyn Superbas of the National League and the Detroit Tigers and New York Highlanders of the American League.
- September 3 – Jack Barnett, 43, backup outfielder for the St. Louis Cardinals in the 1907 season.
- September 5 – Dots Miller, 36, infielder who spent twelve seasons with the Pittsburgh Pirates, St. Louis Cardinals and Philadelphia Phillies, and a member of the Pittsburgh team that won the National League pennant and defeated the Detroit Tigers in the 1909 World Series.
- September 9 – George Keerl, 76, second baseman for the 1875 Chicago White Stockings of the National League.
- September 18 – General Stafford, 55, versatile fielder who played over 100 games at three different positions for five teams, and a member of the 1898 National League Champion Boston Beaneaters.
- October 21 – Biff Sheehan, 55, outfielder/first baseman for the St. Louis Browns of the National League during the 1895 and 1896 seasons.
- October 22 – Warren McLaughlin, 47, pitcher who played for the Philadelphia Phillies and Pittsburgh Pirates between 1900 and 1903.
- October 29 – Jack Nabors, 35, pitcher for the Philadelphia Athletics of the American League from 1915 to 1917, who lost 19 consecutive decisions in 1916 to set a major league record that has never been matched.
- October 29 – Jimmy Ryan, 60, center fielder for five teams between 1895 and 1903; a .306 career hitter who led the National League in hits, home runs, doubles and slugging in 1888; recovered from a serious injury in 1893 train wreck to hit .361 the next year, and finished third all-time in hits, fourth in runs and home runs upon retirement.

=== November–December ===
- November 5 – Buck Becannon, 64, pitcher who played from 1884 to 1885 for the New York Metropolitans of the American Association and with the 1887 New York Giants of the National League.
- November 12 – Mark Polhemus, 63, outfielder who played in 1887 with the Indianapolis Hoosiers of the National League.
- November 16 – Fred House, 33, pitcher who posted a 1–2 record and a 5.20 ERA for the Detroit Tigers in 1913.
- November 19 – Frank Pears, 57, pitcher for the 1889 Kansas City Cowboys of the American Association and the 1893 St. Louis Browns of the National League.
- December 9 – Wild Bill Donovan, 47, pitcher who had 25-win seasons with 1901 Brooklyn and 1907 Detroit teams; later managed Highlanders and Phillies
