= 1923 Major League Baseball season =

1923 MLB season
- League: American League (AL); National League (NL)
- Sport: Baseball
- Duration: Regular season: April 17 – October 7, 1923; World Series: October 10–15, 1923
- Games: 154
- Teams: 16 (8 per league)

Regular Season
- Season MVP: AL: Babe Ruth (NYY)
- AL champions: New York Yankees
- AL runners-up: Detroit Tigers
- NL champions: New York Giants
- NL runners-up: Cincinnati Reds

World Series
- Champions: New York Yankees
- Runners-up: New York Giants

MLB seasons
- ← 1922 1924 →

Locations of teams for the 1923–1931 American League seasons
American League
Locations of teams for the 1920–1931 National League seasons
National League

The 1923 major league baseball season began on April 17, 1923. The regular season ended on October 7, with the New York Giants and New York Yankees as the regular season champions of the National League and American League, respectively. The postseason began with Game 1 of the 20th World Series on October 10 and ended with Game 6 on October 15. In the third consecutive iteration of the Subway Series, the Yankees defeated the Giants, four games to two, capturing their first championship in franchise history. This was the third World Series between the two teams, and the first to see the Yankees win over the Giants. Going into the season, the defending World Series champions were the New York Giants from the 1922 season.

This was the second of eight seasons that "League Awards", a precursor to the Major League Baseball Most Valuable Player Award (introduced in 1931), were issued. Only an American League award was given in 1923.

== Schedule ==
The 1923 schedule consisted of 154 games for all teams in the American League and National League, each of which had eight teams. Each team was scheduled to play 22 games against the other seven teams of their respective league. This continued the format put in place since the 1904 season (except for 1919) and would be used until 1961 in the American League and 1962 in the National League.

National League Opening Day took place on April 17 with all teams playing, while American League Opening Day took place the following day with all teams playing. The final day of the regular season was on October 7. The World Series took place between October 10 and October 15.

== Rule changes ==
The 1923 season saw the following rule changes:

- A rule was passed preventing the transfer of players from one club to another after June 15 except through the waiver process.
- The leagues decided that the major-league draft would begin on the first day of the World Series, in the city where the first World Series game was held.
- Waiver rules were amended to provide that a team asking for and then withdrawing a waiver request on a player must do so within 48 hours or forfeit their rights to the player.
- The barnstorming rule, which had resulted in the suspension of Babe Ruth at the beginning of the season, was amended to prohibit players from participating in exhibition games after October 31 (the American League had already established this rule the previous season).
- During World Series games, Commissioner Kenesaw Mountain Landis and the president or another official of the home team were given the authority to determine when ground conditions were suitable for play, although once a game began, the decision on whether to suspend or postpone games would rest with the umpires.
- Teams would be permitted to carry 40 players on their roster until June 15, instead of the prior May 15 deadline.

== Teams ==
League	Team	City	Ballpark	Capacity	Manager
American League	Boston Red Sox	Boston, Massachusetts	Fenway Park	27,000	Frank Chance
American League	Chicago White Sox	Chicago, Illinois	Comiskey Park	28,000	Kid Gleason
American League	Cleveland Indians	Cleveland, Ohio	Dunn Field	21,414	Tris Speaker
American League	Detroit Tigers	Detroit, Michigan	Navin Field	30,000	Ty Cobb
American League	New York Yankees	New York, New York	Yankee Stadium	58,000	Miller Huggins
American League	Philadelphia Athletics	Philadelphia, Pennsylvania	Shibe Park	23,000	Connie Mack
American League	St. Louis Browns	St. Louis, Missouri	Sportsman's Park	24,040	Lee Fohl
American League	St. Louis Browns	St. Louis, Missouri	Sportsman's Park	24,040	Jimmy Austin
American League	Washington Senators	Washington, D.C.	Griffith Stadium	27,000	Donie Bush
National League	Boston Braves	Boston, Massachusetts	Braves Field	40,000	Fred Mitchell
National League	Brooklyn Robins	New York, New York	Ebbets Field	30,000	Wilbert Robinson
National League	Chicago Cubs	Chicago, Illinois	Cubs Park	20,000	Bill Killefer
National League	Cincinnati Reds	Cincinnati, Ohio	Redland Field	20,696	Pat Moran
National League	New York Giants	New York, New York	Polo Grounds	43,000	John McGraw
National League	Philadelphia Phillies	Philadelphia, Pennsylvania	Baker Bowl	18,000	Art Fletcher
National League	Pittsburgh Pirates	Pittsburgh, Pennsylvania	Forbes Field	25,000	Bill McKechnie
National League	St. Louis Cardinals	St. Louis, Missouri	Sportsman's Park	24,040	Branch Rickey

== Standings ==
=== American League ===
American League
Team	W	L	Pct.	GB	Home	Road
New York Yankees	98	54	.645	—	46‍–‍30	52‍–‍24
Detroit Tigers	83	71	.539	16	45‍–‍32	38‍–‍39
Cleveland Indians	82	71	.536	16½	42‍–‍36	40‍–‍35
Washington Senators	75	78	.490	23½	43‍–‍34	32‍–‍44
St. Louis Browns	74	78	.487	24	40‍–‍36	34‍–‍42
Philadelphia Athletics	69	83	.454	29	34‍–‍41	35‍–‍42
Chicago White Sox	69	85	.448	30	30‍–‍45	39‍–‍40
Boston Red Sox	61	91	.401	37	37‍–‍40	24‍–‍51

=== National League ===
National League
Team	W	L	Pct.	GB	Home	Road
New York Giants	95	58	.621	—	47‍–‍30	48‍–‍28
Cincinnati Reds	91	63	.591	4½	46‍–‍32	45‍–‍31
Pittsburgh Pirates	87	67	.565	8½	47‍–‍30	40‍–‍37
Chicago Cubs	83	71	.539	12½	46‍–‍31	37‍–‍40
St. Louis Cardinals	79	74	.516	16	42‍–‍35	37‍–‍39
Brooklyn Robins	76	78	.494	19½	37‍–‍40	39‍–‍38
Boston Braves	54	100	.351	41½	22‍–‍55	32‍–‍45
Philadelphia Phillies	50	104	.325	45½	20‍–‍55	30‍–‍49

=== Tie games ===
7 tie games (5 in AL, 2 in NL), which are not factored into winning percentage or games behind (and were often replayed again) occurred throughout the season.

==== American League ====
- Boston Red Sox, 2
- Chicago White Sox, 2
- Detroit Tigers, 1
- Philadelphia Athletics, 1
- St. Louis Browns, 2
- Washington Senators, 2

==== National League ====
- Boston Braves, 1
- Brooklyn Robins, 1
- Philadelphia Phillies, 1
- St. Louis Cardinals, 1

== Postseason ==
The postseason began on October 10 and ended on October 15 with the New York Yankees defeating the New York Giants in the 1923 World Series in six games.

=== Bracket ===
World Series
AL	New York Yankees	4
NL	New York Giants	2

== Managerial changes ==
=== Off-season ===
Team	Former Manager	New Manager
Boston Red Sox	Hugh Duffy	Frank Chance
Philadelphia Phillies	Kaiser Wilhelm	Art Fletcher
Washington Senators	Clyde Milan	Donie Bush

=== In-season ===
Team	Former Manager	New Manager
St. Louis Browns	Lee Fohl	Jimmy Austin

== League leaders ==
=== American League ===
Hitting leaders
Stat	Player	Total
AVG	Harry Heilmann (DET)	.403
OPS	Babe Ruth (NYY)	1.309
HR	Babe Ruth (NYY)	41
RBI	Babe Ruth (NYY); Tris Speaker (CLE)	130
R	Babe Ruth (NYY)	151
H	Charlie Jamieson (CLE)	222
SB	Eddie Collins (CWS)	48

Pitching leaders
Stat	Player	Total
W	George Uhle (CLE)	26
L	Herman Pillette (DET); Eddie Rommel (PHA)	19
ERA	Stan Coveleski (CLE)	2.76
K	Walter Johnson (WSH)	130
IP	George Uhle (CLE)	357.2
SV	Allen Russell (WSH)	9
WHIP	Waite Hoyt (NYY)	1.228

=== National League ===
Hitting leaders
Stat	Player	Total
AVG	Rogers Hornsby (STL)	.384
OPS	Rogers Hornsby (STL)	1.086
HR	Cy Williams (PHI)	41
RBI	Irish Meusel (NYG)	125
R	Ross Youngs (NYG)	121
H	Frankie Frisch (NYG)	223
SB	Max Carey (PIT)	51

Pitching leaders
Stat	Player	Total
W	Dolf Luque (CIN)	27
L	Wilbur Cooper (PIT)	19
ERA	Dolf Luque (CIN)	1.93
K	Dazzy Vance (BRO)	197
IP	Burleigh Grimes (BRO)	327.0
SV	Claude Jonnard (NYG)	7
WHIP	Grover Alexander (CHC)	1.108

== Milestones ==
=== Batters ===
==== Cycles ====
- Pie Traynor (PIT):
  - Traynor hit for his first cycle seventh in franchise history, on July 7 against the Philadelphia Phillies.

==== Other batting accomplishments ====
- Max Carey (PIT):
  - Set a major league record by stealing his 37th consecutive base against the New York Giants on May 13. Coincidentally, the streak began on July 7, 1922 also against the Giants.

=== Pitchers ===
==== No-hitters ====
- Sad Sam Jones (NYY):
  - Jones threw his first career no-hitter and second no-hitter in franchise history, by defeating the Philadelphia Athletics 2–0 on September 4. Jones walked one and struck out none.
- Howard Ehmke (BOS):
  - Ehmke threw his first career no-hitter and 10th no-hitter in franchise history, by defeating the Philadelphia Athletics 4–0 on September 7. Ehmke walked one and struck out one.

==== Other pitching accomplishments ====
- Walter Johnson (WSH):
  - Recorded his 3,000th career strikeout on July 22 by striking out Stan Coveleski of the Cleveland Indians. Johnson became the first player to reach this mark in Major League history.

=== Miscellaneous ===
- Cleveland Indians:
  - Set a modern (1900–present) major league record for most runs scored in the sixth inning, by scoring 13 runs against the Boston Red Sox in game one of a doubleheader on July 7.

== Awards and honors ==
- League Award: Babe Ruth (NYY)

== Home field attendance ==
Team name	Wins	%±	Home attendance	%±	Per game
New York Yankees	98	4.3%	1,007,066	−1.9%	13,251
Detroit Tigers	83	5.1%	911,377	5.8%	11,836
New York Giants	95	2.2%	820,780	−13.2%	10,659
Chicago Cubs	83	3.8%	703,705	29.8%	9,139
Pittsburgh Pirates	87	2.4%	611,082	16.7%	7,936
Cincinnati Reds	91	5.8%	575,063	16.5%	7,373
Chicago White Sox	69	−10.4%	573,778	−4.8%	7,650
Brooklyn Robins	76	0.0%	564,666	13.2%	7,239
Cleveland Indians	82	5.1%	558,856	5.8%	7,165
Philadelphia Athletics	69	6.2%	534,122	25.6%	7,122
St. Louis Browns	74	−20.4%	430,296	−39.6%	5,517
Washington Senators	75	8.7%	357,406	−22.1%	4,524
St. Louis Cardinals	79	−7.1%	338,551	−37.0%	4,340
Boston Red Sox	61	0.0%	229,688	−11.4%	2,945
Philadelphia Phillies	50	−12.3%	228,168	−1.9%	3,042
Boston Braves	54	1.9%	227,802	35.6%	2,958

== Venues ==
The New York Yankees leave the Polo Grounds, where they shared with the New York Giants for the previous 10 seasons, and open Yankee Stadium, where they would play for 84 seasons through 1973 and 1976 through 2008. The Yankees, whose home had been Manhattan for their entire existence, moved into the Bronx where they remain to this day.

Referring to the Philadelphia Phillies' home at National League Park, on July 11, The Philadelphia Inquirer coined the term Baker Bowl. "Baker Bowl" became a common name for the stadium until its closure in 1938, although the Phillies would still refer to the venue as its official "National League Park" name in newspaper advertisements.

On August 21, Clark Griffith, owner of the Washington Senators since 1920, announced that National Park would be named after himself, Griffith Stadium.

== See also ==
- 1923 in baseball (Events, Births, Deaths)
