= 1924 New York Giants season =

1924 New York Giants
- National League champions
- League: National League
- Ballpark: Polo Grounds
- City: New York City
- Record: 93–60 (.608)
- League place: 1st
- Owners: Charles Stoneham
- Managers: John McGraw

The 1924 New York Giants season was the franchise's 42nd season. The team finished first in the National League with a record of 93–60, winning the NL pennant for a record fourth consecutive season, a record that still stands today. They went on to the World Series, losing to the Washington Senators in seven games.

== Regular season ==
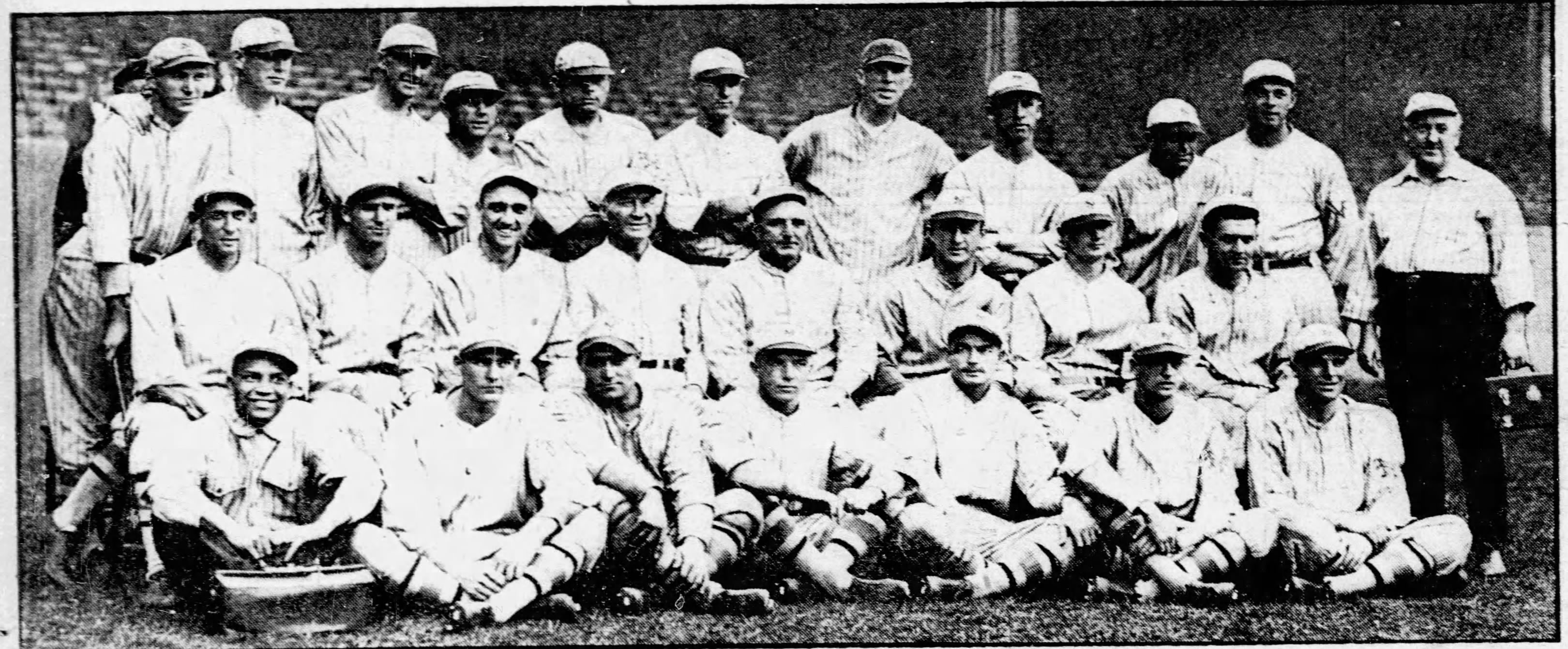
Photograph of the 1924 Giants after winning the pennant

In the final series of the 1924 season, the Giants were playing the Philadelphia Phillies at the Polo Grounds and battling for the pennant with the Robins. Giants outfielder Jimmy O'Connell offered Phillies shortstop Heinie Sand $500 to throw the games. Sand rejected the bribe and reported it to Phillies manager Art Fletcher. It eventually led to the lifetime suspension of O'Connell and Giants coach Cozy Dolan by Commissioner Landis, although future-Hall of Famers Frankie Frisch, George Kelly, and Ross Youngs were also implicated.

=== Season standings ===
National League
Team	W	L	Pct.	GB	Home	Road
New York Giants	93	60	.608	—	51‍–‍26	42‍–‍34
Brooklyn Robins	92	62	.597	1½	46‍–‍31	46‍–‍31
Pittsburgh Pirates	90	63	.588	3	49‍–‍28	41‍–‍35
Cincinnati Reds	83	70	.542	10	43‍–‍33	40‍–‍37
Chicago Cubs	81	72	.529	12	46‍–‍31	35‍–‍41
St. Louis Cardinals	65	89	.422	28½	40‍–‍37	25‍–‍52
Philadelphia Phillies	55	96	.364	37	26‍–‍49	29‍–‍47
Boston Braves	53	100	.346	40	28‍–‍48	25‍–‍52

=== Record vs. opponents ===
1924 National League record Sources:
Team	BSN	BRO	CHC	CIN	NYG	PHI	PIT	STL
Boston	—	7–15	6–15	12–10	5–17	10–12–1	7–15	6–16
Brooklyn	15–7	—	12–10	12–10	8–14	17–5	13–9	15–7
Chicago	15–6	10–12	—	9–13	9–13–1	16–6	7–15	15–7
Cincinnati	10–12	10–12	13–9	—	9–13	16–5	12–10	13–9
New York	17–5	14–8	13–9–1	13–9	—	14–7	9–13	13–9
Philadelphia	12–10–1	5–17	6–16	5–16	7–14	—	8–13	12–10
Pittsburgh	15–7	9–13	15–7	10–12	13–9	13–8	—	15–7
St. Louis	16–6	7–15	7–15	9–13	9–13	10–12	7–15	—

=== Roster ===
1924 New York Giants
Roster
Pitchers: Harry Baldwin; Virgil Barnes; Jack Bentley; Leon Cadore; Wayland Dean; Dinty Gearin; Kent Greenfield; Walt Huntzinger; Claude Jonnard; Ernie Maun; Hugh McQuillan; Art Nehf; Joe Oeschger; Rosy Ryan; Mule Watson	Catchers: Eddie Ainsmith; Hank Gowdy; Grover Hartley; Frank Snyder; Infielders: Frankie Frisch; Heinie Groh; Travis Jackson; George Kelly; Freddie Lindstrom; Bill Terry	Outfielders: Buddy Crump; Irish Meusel; Jimmy O'Connell; Billy Southworth; Hack Wilson; Ross Youngs	Manager: John McGraw; Coaches: Cozy Dolan; Hughie Jennings

== Player stats ==
= Indicates team leader

= Indicates league leader

=== Batting ===
==== Starters by position ====
Note: Pos = Position; G = Games played; AB = At bats; H = Hits; Avg. = Batting average; HR = Home runs; RBI = Runs batted in

Pos	Player	G	AB	H	Avg.	HR	RBI
C	Frank Snyder	118	354	107	.302	5	53
1B	George Kelly	144	571	185	.324	21	136
2B	Frankie Frisch	145	603	198	.328	7	69
SS	Travis Jackson	151	596	180	.302	11	76
3B	Heinie Groh	145	559	157	.281	2	46
OF	Hack Wilson	107	383	113	.295	10	57
OF	Ross Youngs	133	526	187	.356	10	74
OF	Irish Meusel	139	549	170	.310	6	102

==== Other batters ====
Note: G = Games played; AB = At bats; H = Hits; Avg. = Batting average; HR = Home runs; RBI = Runs batted in

Player	G	AB	H	Avg.	HR	RBI
Billy Southworth	94	281	72	.256	3	36
Hank Gowdy	87	191	62	.325	4	37
Bill Terry	77	163	39	.239	5	24
Jimmy O'Connell	52	104	33	.317	2	18
Freddie Lindstrom	52	79	20	.253	0	4
Grover Hartley	4	7	2	.286	0	1
Eddie Ainsmith	10	5	3	.600	0	0
Buddy Crump	1	4	0	.000	0	1

=== Pitching ===
==== Starting pitchers ====
Note: G = Games pitched; IP = Innings pitched; W = Wins; L = Losses; ERA = Earned run average; SO = Strikeouts

Player	G	IP	W	L	ERA	SO
Virgil Barnes	35	229.1	16	10	3.06	59
Jack Bentley	28	188.0	16	5	3.78	60
Hugh McQuillan	27	184.0	14	8	2.69	49
Art Nehf	30	171.2	14	4	3.62	72
Wayland Dean	26	125.2	6	12	5.01	39

==== Other pitchers ====
Note: G = Games pitched; IP = Innings pitched; W = Wins; L = Losses; ERA = Earned run average; SO = Strikeouts

Player	G	IP	W	L	ERA	SO
Rosy Ryan	37	124.2	7	6	4.26	36
Mule Watson	22	99.2	7	4	3.79	18
Harry Baldwin	10	33.2	3	1	4.28	5
Walt Huntzinger	12	32.1	1	1	4.45	6
Dinty Gearin	6	29.0	1	2	2.48	4
Joe Oeschger	10	29.0	2	0	3.10	10
Kent Greenfield	1	3.0	0	1	15.00	1

==== Relief pitchers ====
Note: G = Games pitched; W = Wins; L = Losses; SV = Saves; ERA = Earned run average; SO = Strikeouts

Player	G	W	L	SV	ERA	SO
Claude Jonnard	34	4	5	4	2.41	40
Ernie Maun	22	2	1	0	5.91	5
Leon Cadore	2	0	0	0	0.00	2

== 1924 World Series ==
=== Game 1 ===
October 4, 1924, at Griffith Stadium in Washington, D.C.

Team	1	2	3	4	5	6	7	8	9	10	11	12	R	H	E
New York (N)	0	1	0	1	0	0	0	0	0	0	0	2	4	14	1
Washington	0	0	0	0	0	1	0	0	1	0	0	1	3	10	1
W: Art Nehf (1–0) L: Walter Johnson (0–1)
HR: NYG – George Kelly (1), Bill Terry (1)

=== Game 2 ===
October 5, 1924, at Griffith Stadium in Washington, D.C.

Team	1	2	3	4	5	6	7	8	9	R	H	E
New York (N)	0	0	0	0	0	0	1	0	2	3	6	0
Washington	2	0	0	0	1	0	0	0	1	4	6	1
W: Tom Zachary (1–0) L: Jack Bentley (0–1) S: Firpo Marberry (1)
HR: WAS – Goose Goslin (1), Bucky Harris (1)

=== Game 3 ===
October 6, 1924, at the Polo Grounds (IV) in New York City

Team	1	2	3	4	5	6	7	8	9	R	H	E
Washington	0	0	0	2	0	0	0	1	1	4	9	2
New York (N)	0	2	1	1	0	1	0	1	x	6	12	0
W: Hugh McQuillan (2–0) L: Firpo Marberry (0–1) S: Mule Watson (1)
HR: NYG – Rosy Ryan (1)

=== Game 4 ===
October 7, 1924, at the Polo Grounds (IV) in New York City

Team	1	2	3	4	5	6	7	8	9	R	H	E
Washington	0	0	3	0	2	0	0	2	0	7	13	3
New York (N)	1	0	0	0	0	1	1	1	0	4	6	1
W: George Mogridge (1–0) L: Virgil Barnes (0–1) S: Firpo Marberry (2)
HR: WAS – Goose Goslin (2)

=== Game 5 ===
October 8, 1924, at the Polo Grounds (IV) in New York City

Team	1	2	3	4	5	6	7	8	9	R	H	E
Washington	0	0	0	1	0	0	0	1	0	2	9	1
New York (N)	0	0	1	0	2	0	0	3	x	6	13	0
W: Jack Bentley (1–1) L: Walter Johnson (0–2) S: Hugh McQuillan (1)
HR: WAS – Goose Goslin (3), NYG – Jack Bentley (1)

=== Game 6 ===
October 9, 1924, at Griffith Stadium in Washington, D.C.

Team	1	2	3	4	5	6	7	8	9	R	H	E
New York (N)	1	0	0	0	0	0	0	0	0	1	7	1
Washington	0	0	0	0	2	0	0	0	0	2	4	0
W: Tom Zachary (2–0) L: Art Nehf (1–1)

=== Game 7 ===
October 10, 1924, at Griffith Stadium in Washington, D.C.

Team	1	2	3	4	5	6	7	8	9	10	11	12	R	H	E
New York (N)	0	0	0	0	0	3	0	0	0	0	0	0	3	8	3
Washington	0	0	0	1	0	0	0	2	0	0	0	1	4	10	4
W: Walter Johnson (1–2) L: Jack Bentley (1–2)
HR: WAS – Bucky Harris (2)
