= 1922 New York Giants season =

1922 New York Giants
- World Series champions National League champions
- League: National League
- Ballpark: Polo Grounds
- City: New York City
- Record: 93–61 (.604)
- League place: 1st
- Owners: Charles Stoneham
- Managers: John McGraw

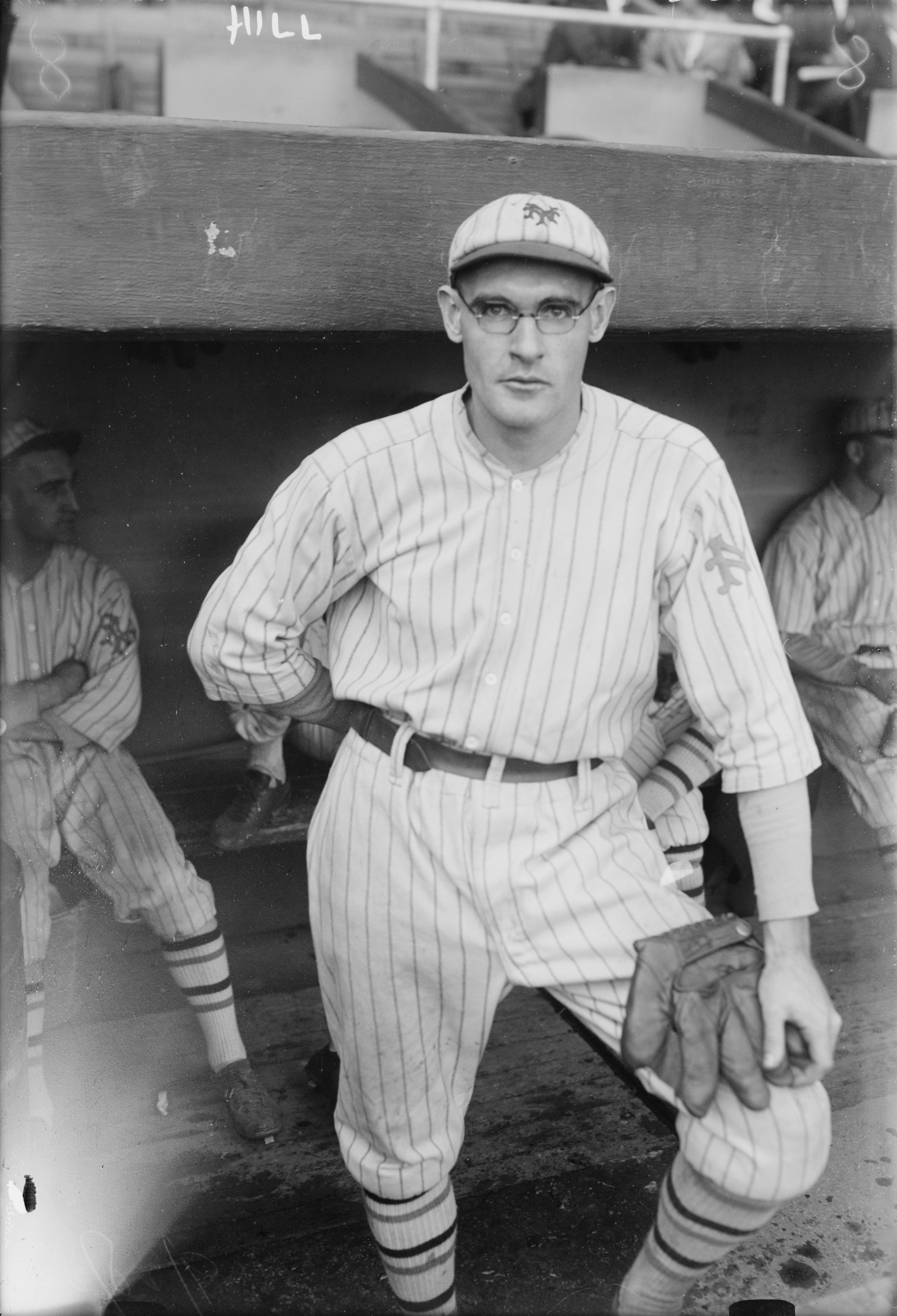
Pitcher Carmen Hill with the Giants in 1922

The 1922 New York Giants season was the franchise's 40th season. The team finished in first place in the National League with a 93–61 record. The Giants won their second consecutive World Series, defeating the New York Yankees in five games (Game 2 was a 3–3 tie) without a loss.

== Regular season ==
=== Season standings ===
National League
Team	W	L	Pct.	GB	Home	Road
New York Giants	93	61	.604	—	51‍–‍27	42‍–‍34
Cincinnati Reds	86	68	.558	7	48‍–‍29	38‍–‍39
St. Louis Cardinals	85	69	.552	8	42‍–‍35	43‍–‍34
Pittsburgh Pirates	85	69	.552	8	45‍–‍33	40‍–‍36
Chicago Cubs	80	74	.519	13	39‍–‍37	41‍–‍37
Brooklyn Robins	76	78	.494	17	44‍–‍34	32‍–‍44
Philadelphia Phillies	57	96	.373	35½	35‍–‍41	22‍–‍55
Boston Braves	53	100	.346	39½	32‍–‍43	21‍–‍57

=== Record vs. opponents ===
1922 National League record Sources:
Team	BSN	BRO	CHC	CIN	NYG	PHI	PIT	STL
Boston	—	7–15	4–18	5–17	8–14–1	8–13	10–12	11–11
Brooklyn	15–7	—	11–11	8–14	8–14–1	15–7	11–11	8–14
Chicago	18–4	11–11	—	11–11–1	8–14	9–13–1	10–12	13–9
Cincinnati	17–5	14–8	11–11–1	—	10–12	15–7	11–11–1	8–14
New York	14–8–1	14–8–1	14–8	12–10	—	15–7	11–11	13–9
Philadelphia	13–8	7–15	13–9–1	7–15	7–15	—	3–19	7–15
Pittsburgh	12–10	11–11	12–10	11–11–1	11–11	19–3	—	9–13
St. Louis	11–11	14–8	9–13	14–8	9–13	15–7	13–9	—

=== Roster ===
1922 New York Giants
Roster
Pitchers: Jesse Barnes; Virgil Barnes; Clint Blume; Red Causey; Mike Cvengros; Phil Douglas; Carmen Hill; Fred Johnson; Claude Jonnard; Hugh McQuillan; Art Nehf; Rosy Ryan; Jack Scott; Red Shea; Fred Toney	Catchers: Alex Gaston; Earl Smith; Frank Snyder; Infielders: Dave Bancroft; Frankie Frisch; Heinie Groh; Travis Jackson; George Kelly; Lee King; Waddy MacPhee; Freddie Maguire; Johnny Rawlings	Outfielders: Bill Cunningham; Mahlon Higbee; Irish Meusel; Dave Robertson; Ralph Shinners; Casey Stengel; Ross Youngs; Other batters: Joe Berry; Ike Boone; Cozy Dolan	Manager: John McGraw; Coaches: Cozy Dolan; Hughie Jennings

== Player stats ==
=== Batting ===
==== Starters by position ====
Note: Pos = Position; G = Games played; AB = At bats; H = Hits; Avg. = Batting average; HR = Home runs; RBI = Runs batted in

Pos	Player	G	AB	H	Avg.	HR	RBI
C	Frank Snyder	104	318	109	.343	5	51
1B	George Kelly	151	592	194	.328	17	107
2B	Frankie Frisch	132	514	168	.327	5	51
SS	Dave Bancroft	156	651	209	.321	4	60
3B	Heinie Groh	115	426	113	.265	3	51
OF	Casey Stengel	84	250	92	.368	7	48
OF	Ross Youngs	149	559	185	.331	7	86
OF	Irish Meusel	154	617	204	.331	16	132

==== Other batters ====
Note: G = Games played; AB = At bats; H = Hits; Avg. = Batting average; HR = Home runs; RBI = Runs batted in

Player	G	AB	H	Avg.	HR	RBI
Johnny Rawlings	88	308	87	.282	1	30
Earl Smith	90	234	65	.278	9	39
Bill Cunningham	85	229	75	.328	2	33
Ralph Shinners	56	135	34	.252	0	15
Dave Robertson	42	47	13	.277	1	3
Lee King	20	34	6	.176	0	2
Alex Gaston	16	26	5	.192	0	1
Freddie Maguire	5	12	4	.333	0	1
Mahlon Higbee	3	10	4	.400	1	5
Travis Jackson	3	8	0	.000	0	0
Waddy MacPhee	2	7	2	.286	0	0
Ike Boone	2	2	1	.500	0	0
Joe Berry	6	0	0	----	0	0
Cozy Dolan	1	0	0	----	0	0

=== Pitching ===
==== Starting pitchers ====
Note: G = Games pitched; IP = Innings pitched; W = Wins; L = Losses; ERA = Earned run average; SO = Strikeouts

Player	G	IP	W	L	ERA	SO
Art Nehf	37	268.1	19	13	3.29	60
Jesse Barnes	37	212.2	13	8	3.51	52
Phil Douglas	24	157.2	11	4	2.63	33
Hugh McQuillan	15	94.1	6	5	3.82	24
Fred Toney	13	86.1	5	6	4.17	10
Fred Johnson	2	18.0	0	2	4.00	8
Clint Blume	1	9.0	1	0	1.00	2
Mike Cvengros	1	9.0	0	1	4.00	3

==== Other pitchers ====
Note: G = Games pitched; IP = Innings pitched; W = Wins; L = Losses; ERA = Earned run average; SO = Strikeouts

Player	G	IP	W	L	ERA	SO
Rosy Ryan	46	191.2	17	12	3.01	75
Jack Scott	17	79.2	8	2	4.41	37
Carmen Hill	8	28.1	2	1	4.76	6

==== Relief pitchers ====
Note: G = Games pitched; W = Wins; L = Losses; SV = Saves; ERA = Earned run average; SO = Strikeouts

Player	G	W	L	SV	ERA	SO
Claude Jonnard	33	6	1	4	3.84	44
Red Causey	24	4	3	1	3.18	13
Virgil Barnes	22	1	0	2	3.48	16
Red Shea	11	0	3	0	4.70	5

== 1922 World Series ==
=== Game 1 ===
October 4, 1922, at the Polo Grounds in New York City

Team	1	2	3	4	5	6	7	8	9	R	H	E
New York (A)	0	0	0	0	0	1	1	0	0	2	7	0
New York (N)	0	0	0	0	0	0	0	3	x	3	11	3
W: Rosy Ryan (1–0) L: Bullet Joe Bush (0–1)

=== Game 2 ===
October 5, 1922, at the Polo Grounds in New York City

Team	1	2	3	4	5	6	7	8	9	10	R	H	E
New York (N)	3	0	0	0	0	0	0	0	0	0	3	8	1
New York (A)	1	0	0	1	0	0	0	1	0	0	3	8	0
W: NA L: NA
HR: NYG – Irish Meusel (1), NYY – Aaron Ward (1)

=== Game 3 ===
October 6, 1922, at the Polo Grounds in New York City

Team	1	2	3	4	5	6	7	8	9	R	H	E
New York (A)	0	0	0	0	0	0	0	0	0	0	4	1
New York (N)	0	2	0	0	0	0	1	0	x	3	12	1
W: Jack Scott (1–0) L: Waite Hoyt (0–1)

=== Game 4 ===
October 7, 1922, at the Polo Grounds in New York City

Team	1	2	3	4	5	6	7	8	9	R	H	E
New York (N)	0	0	0	0	4	0	0	0	0	4	9	1
New York (A)	2	0	0	0	0	0	1	0	0	3	8	0
W: Hugh McQuillan (1–0) L: Carl Mays (0–1)
HR: NYY – Aaron Ward (2)

=== Game 5 ===
October 8, 1922, at the Polo Grounds in New York City

Team	1	2	3	4	5	6	7	8	9	R	H	E
New York (A)	1	0	0	0	1	0	1	0	0	3	5	0
New York (N)	0	2	0	0	0	0	0	3	x	5	10	0
W: Art Nehf (1–0) L: Bullet Joe Bush (0–2)
