= 1923 World Series =

1923 Major League Baseball championship series

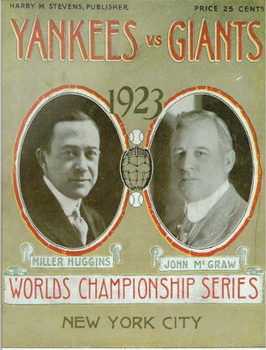
- Program covers for the Series
Team (Wins)	Managers	Season
New York Yankees (4)	Miller Huggins	98–54, .645, GA: 16
New York Giants (2)	John McGraw	95–58, .621, GA: 4½
- Dates: October 10–15
- Venue(s): Yankee Stadium (New York Yankees); Polo Grounds (New York Giants)
- Umpires: Billy Evans (AL), Hank O'Day (NL); Dick Nallin (AL), Bob Hart (NL)
- Hall of Famers: Umpires: Billy Evans; Hank O'Day; Yankees: Miller Huggins (mgr.); Lou Gehrig (DNP); Waite Hoyt; Herb Pennock; Babe Ruth; Giants: John McGraw (mgr.); Dave Bancroft; Frankie Frisch; Travis Jackson; George Kelly; Casey Stengel‡ Bill Terry (DNP); Hack Wilson (DNP); Ross Youngs ‡ Elected as a manager

Broadcast
- Radio: Westinghouse
- Radio announcers: W. O. McGeehan (Games 1–3); Graham McNamee (Games 3–6)

The 1923 World Series was the championship series in Major League Baseball for the 1923 season. The 20th edition of the World Series, it matched the American League (AL) champion New York Yankees against the National League (NL) champion New York Giants. The Yankees beat the Giants in six games. This would be the first of the Yankees' 27 World Series championships (as of 2026). The series was not played in a 2–3–2 format: as with the previous two Series (where both clubs had shared the Polo Grounds) the home field alternated each game, though this time it involved switching ballparks, as the first Yankee Stadium had opened this season.

== Background ==
The Yankees opened their new stadium in April on a home run by Babe Ruth, setting the tone for the season and this Series, in which Ruth hit three home runs along with drawing eight walks. In Game 2, second baseman, Aaron Ward hit a home run. The Giants' one bright spot was "Old Casey" Stengel, who hit game-winning homers in each of the two Giants' victories. In typically eccentric Stengel fashion, one of them was inside-the-park at the cavernous Yankee Stadium, and his shoe came loose during his run around the bases. Stengel was traded after the season, leading him to quip later in life, "It's a good thing I didn't hit three homers in three games, or McGraw would have traded me to the Three-I League!". A quarter century later, Stengel would take on the role of Yankees manager, and would guide the Bronx Bombers through one of their most successful eras.

In Game 6, the Yankees overcame a 4–1 deficit by staging a five-run rally in the eighth inning to clinch the series.

The three consecutive matchups between the Yankees and Giants (1921–1923) marked the only time (as of 2024), that three straight World Series featured the same two clubs. Brothers Bob and Irish Meusel played against each other in each of those three series, making them the first set of brothers who have competed against each other in multiple championship games.

Thanks to the large seating capacity of the new Yankee Stadium, coupled with expansion of the Polo Grounds the same year, the 1923 Series was the first to eclipse 300,000 in total attendance (301,430), averaging over 50,000 per game (50,238), with gate receipts over $1 million ($1,063,815.00).

This was the third time that a team had inaugurated a new stadium with a World Series win, and would be the last until the St. Louis Cardinals victory in their new ballpark in 2006, and the New York Yankees again won the World Series in 2009 in their new Yankee Stadium.

Babe Ruth had a great series, his first one as a Yankee, batting .368 and hitting three home runs in the series.

Neither Lou Gehrig, Bill Terry nor Hack Wilson played in the Series. These future Hall of Famers were each in their first season and had played no more than thirteen games in the regular season. Gehrig had been called up from Hartford to play for the Yankees that year. In that time, however, a team had to have the permission of both the commissioner and the opposing team's manager to make a roster change so late in the season eligible for postseason play. The Yankees gained the permission of Commissioner Kenesaw Mountain Landis who then told them to get John McGraw's permission. McGraw and the Yankees had a long history of disdain after both teams had shared a stadium and the Giants had won both the 1921 and 1922 World Series from New York. Therefore, he declined permission and Gehrig would not be allowed to participate in the series which otherwise would have been his first World Series. As noted baseball historian John Thorn said, "As if the Yankees needed any more reason to hate John McGraw."

== Summary ==
AL New York Yankees (4) vs. NL New York Giants (2)

Game	Date	Score	Location	Time	Attendance
1	October 10	New York Giants – 5, New York Yankees – 4	Yankee Stadium	2:05	55,307
2	October 11	New York Yankees – 4, New York Giants – 2	Polo Grounds	2:08	40,402
3	October 12	New York Giants – 1, New York Yankees – 0	Yankee Stadium	2:05	62,430
4	October 13	New York Yankees – 8, New York Giants – 4	Polo Grounds	2:32	46,302
5	October 14	New York Giants – 1, New York Yankees – 8	Yankee Stadium	1:55	62,817
6	October 15	New York Yankees – 6, New York Giants – 4	Polo Grounds	2:05	34,172

== Matchups ==
=== Game 1 ===
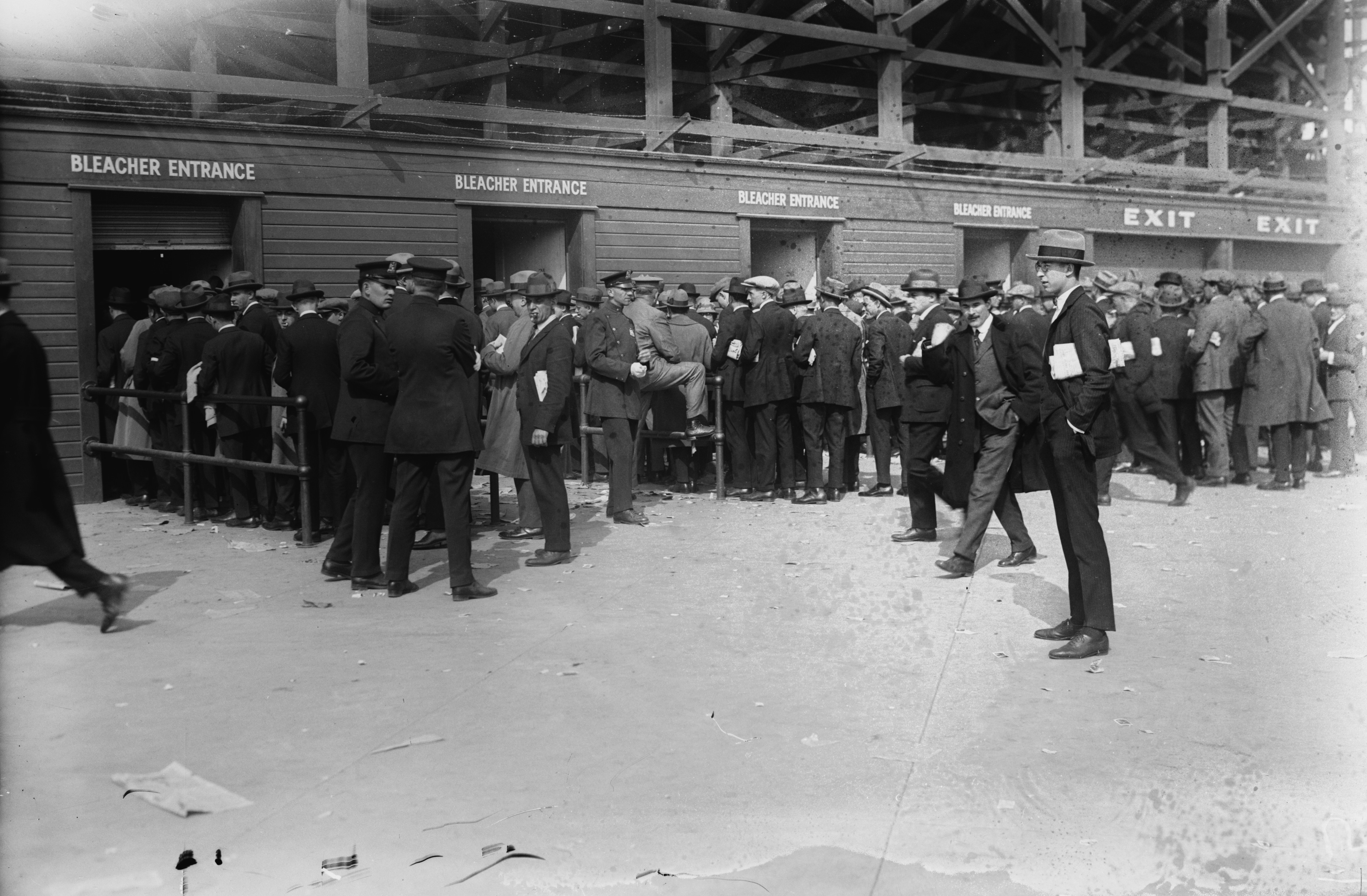
Fans entering Yankee Stadium before Game 1 of the World Series

Wednesday, October 10, 1923 2:00 pm (ET) at Yankee Stadium in Bronx, New York
Team	1	2	3	4	5	6	7	8	9	R	H	E
New York (NL)	0	0	4	0	0	0	0	0	1	5	8	0
New York (AL)	1	2	0	0	0	0	1	0	0	4	12	1
WP: Rosy Ryan (1–0) LP: Bullet Joe Bush (0–1); Home runs: NYG: Casey Stengel (1); NYY: None

A ninth-inning inside-the-park homer by Casey Stengel beat the Yankees on their home field. Babe Ruth scored in the first inning on a Bob Meusel double. Yankee center fielder Whitey Witt's two-run single in the next inning made it 3-0. The Giants fought back with a four-run third, knocking out Yankee starter Waite Hoyt from the game. It was tied at 4-4 in the ninth inning until Casey came to bat, legging out a long drive to the left-center gap.

=== Game 2 ===
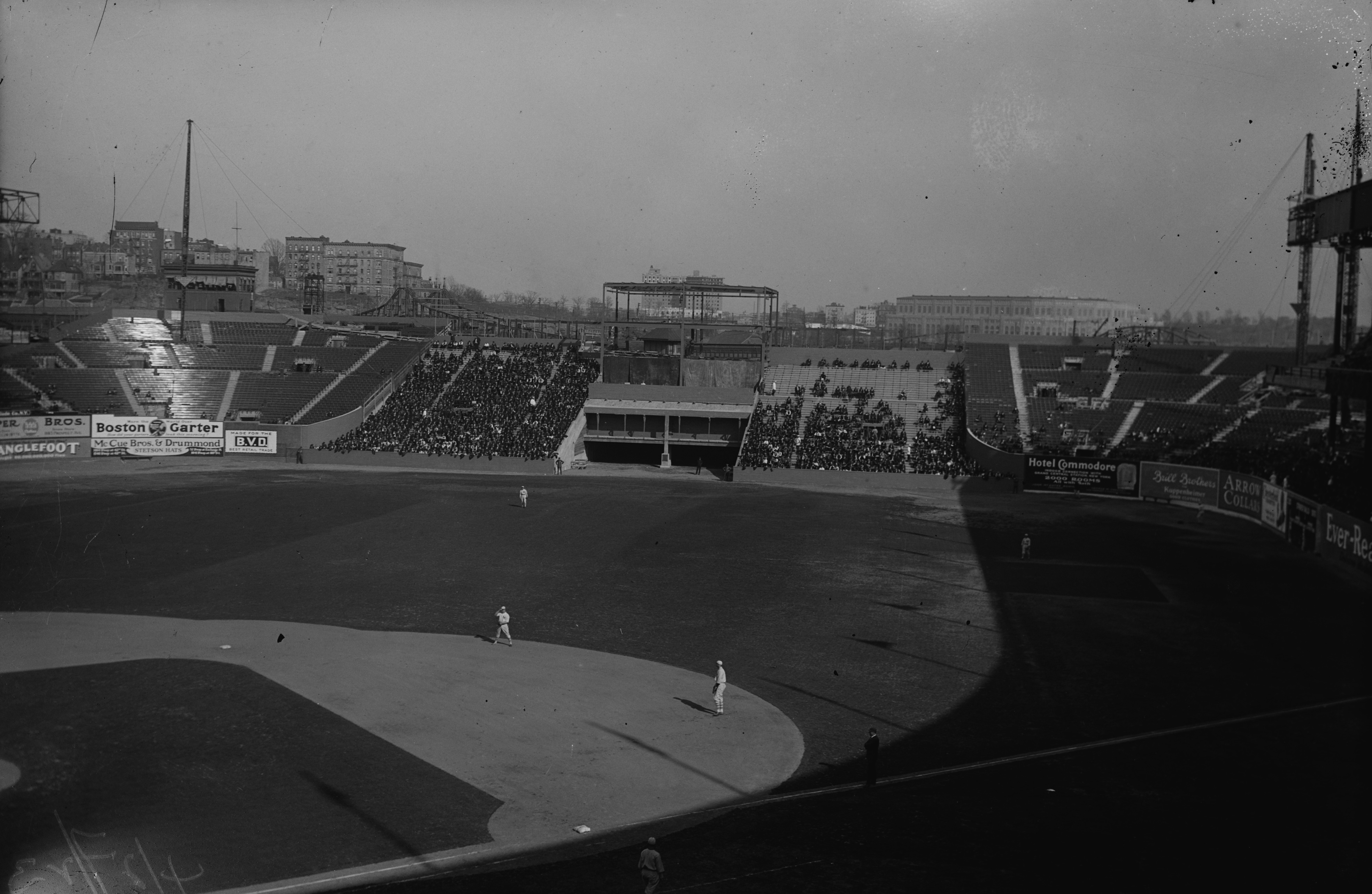
The newly built Yankee Stadium was visible from the Polo Grounds in 1923, seen here above the outfield bleachers.

Thursday, October 11, 1923 2:00 pm (ET) at Polo Grounds in Manhattan, New York
Team	1	2	3	4	5	6	7	8	9	R	H	E
New York (AL)	0	1	0	2	1	0	0	0	0	4	10	0
New York (NL)	0	1	0	0	0	1	0	0	0	2	9	2
WP: Herb Pennock (1–0) LP: Hugh McQuillan (0–1); Home runs: NYY: Aaron Ward (1), Babe Ruth 2 (2); NYG: Irish Meusel (1)

After trading home runs by Aaron Ward and Irish Meusel, a pair of Babe Ruth blasts in the fourth and fifth innings turned out to be the difference.

=== Game 3 ===
Friday, October 12, 1923 2:00 pm (ET) at Yankee Stadium in Bronx, New York
Team	1	2	3	4	5	6	7	8	9	R	H	E
New York (NL)	0	0	0	0	0	0	1	0	0	1	4	0
New York (AL)	0	0	0	0	0	0	0	0	0	0	6	1
WP: Art Nehf (1–0) LP: Sad Sam Jones (0–1); Home runs: NYG: Casey Stengel (2); NYY: None

A scoreless pitching duel lasted until the seventh inning, when Casey Stengel struck again, this time with a homer that left the park. It gave Art Nehf the win over Sad Sam Jones, despite the Giants getting just four hits.

=== Game 4 ===
Saturday, October 13, 1923 2:00 pm (ET) at Polo Grounds in Manhattan, New York
Team	1	2	3	4	5	6	7	8	9	R	H	E
New York (AL)	0	6	1	1	0	0	0	0	0	8	13	1
New York (NL)	0	0	0	0	0	0	0	3	1	4	13	1
WP: Bob Shawkey (1–0) LP: Jack Scott (0–1) Sv: Herb Pennock (1); Home runs: NYY: None; NYG: Ross Youngs (1)

A six-run second inning chased Giant starter Jack Scott, the first four Yankee batters of that inning reaching safely. Bob Meusel added a two-run triple. A ninth-inning leadoff inside-the-park homer by Ross Youngs gave the home team a flicker of hope, but Herb Pennock mopped up in relief.

=== Game 5 ===
Sunday, October 14, 1923 2:00 pm (ET) at Yankee Stadium in Bronx, New York
Team	1	2	3	4	5	6	7	8	9	R	H	E
New York (NL)	0	1	0	0	0	0	0	0	0	1	3	2
New York (AL)	3	4	0	1	0	0	0	0	X	8	14	0
WP: Bullet Joe Bush (1–1) LP: Jack Bentley (0–1); Home runs: NYG: None; NYY: Joe Dugan (1)

It was over in a hurry. Bob Meusel's two-run triple and a Wally Pipp sacrifice fly made it 3-0. Then the Yankees got four more in the second, Joe Dugan's three-run inside-the-park homer the big blow. Bullet Joe Bush surrendered just three hits to the Giants, who now faced elimination.

=== Game 6 ===
Monday, October 15, 1923 2:00 pm (ET) at Polo Grounds in Manhattan, New York
Team	1	2	3	4	5	6	7	8	9	R	H	E
New York (AL)	1	0	0	0	0	0	0	5	0	6	5	0
New York (NL)	1	0	0	1	1	1	0	0	0	4	10	1
WP: Herb Pennock (2–0) LP: Art Nehf (1–1) Sv: Sad Sam Jones (1); Home runs: NYY: Babe Ruth (3); NYG: Frank Snyder (1)

Right off the bat, the Yankees struck with a Babe Ruth two-out homer in the first. But then the Giants and their Polo Grounds crowd came to life. Three singles in the first tied the score. Center fielder Bill Cunningham knocked in a go-ahead run in the fourth, followed by catcher Frank Snyder's homer in the fifth inning. Down 4-1, the Yankees took advantage of two singles followed by 3 consecutive walks. Ruth struck out with the score 4-3, and Bob Meusel hit a clutch two-out single scoring two runs, and a third scoring on an error, making it 6-4 Yankees. Sad Sam Jones would get the 6 out save to win the Yankees their first championship.

== Composite line score ==
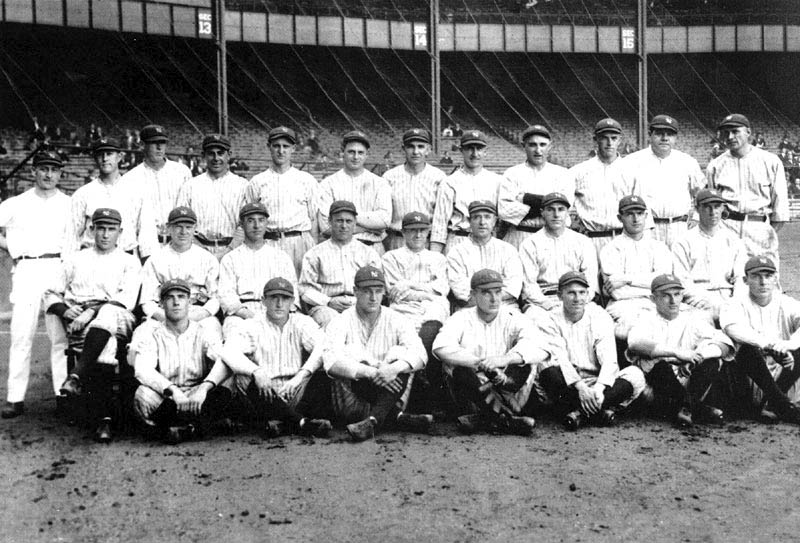
New York Yankees, World Champions

1923 World Series (4–2): New York Yankees (A.L.) over New York Giants (N.L.)

Team	1	2	3	4	5	6	7	8	9	R	H	E
New York Yankees	5	13	1	4	1	0	1	5	0	30	60	3
New York Giants	1	2	4	1	1	2	1	3	2	17	47	6
Total attendance: 301,430 Average attendance: 50,238; Winning player's share: $6,143 Losing player's share: $4,113

== See also ==
- 1921 World Series First World Series match-up between the Giants and the Yankees
- 1922 World Series Second World Series match-up between the Giants and the Yankees
- Subway Series / Giants–Yankees rivalry
