= Sad Sam Jones =

American baseball player (1892–1966)

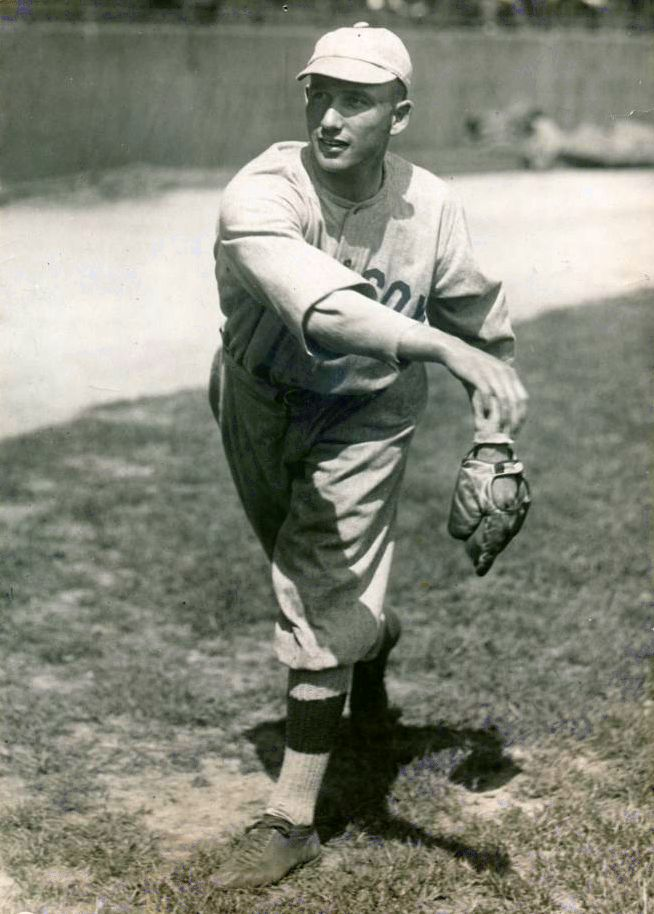
- Pitcher
- Born: July 26, 1892; Woodsfield, Ohio, U.S.
- Died: July 6, 1966 (aged 73); Woodsfield, Ohio, U.S.
- Batted: Right Threw: Right

MLB debut
- June 13, 1914, for the Cleveland Indians

Last MLB appearance
- September 28, 1935, for the Chicago White Sox

MLB statistics
- Win–loss record: 229–217
- Earned run average: 3.84
- Strikeouts: 1,223
- Stats at Baseball Reference

Teams
- Cleveland Indians (1914–1915); Boston Red Sox (1916–1921); New York Yankees (1922–1926); St. Louis Browns (1927); Washington Senators (1928–1931); Chicago White Sox (1932–1935)

Career highlights and awards
- 2× World Series champion (1918, 1923); Pitched a no-hitter on September 4, 1923

Samuel Pond "Sad Sam" Jones (July 26, 1892 – July 6, 1966) was an American professional baseball pitcher who played in Major League Baseball with the Cleveland Indians, Boston Red Sox, New York Yankees, St. Louis Browns, Washington Senators and Chicago White Sox between 1914 and 1935. Jones batted and threw right-handed. His sharp breaking curveball also earned him the nickname "Horsewhips Sam".

== Career ==
In a 22-year career, Jones compiled a 229–217 record with 1223 strikeouts and a 3.84 ERA in 3,883 innings pitched. Jones signed his first professional contract in 1913, with the Flood Sufferers in Zanesville, Ohio. After brief stints with two other minor league teams, he made his major league debut with the Indians in 1914. Before the 1916 season, he was sent to Boston in the same trade that brought Tris Speaker to Cleveland.

In 1918, Jones joined the Red Sox starting rotation, ending with a 16–5 mark, a career-best 2.25 ERA, and a league-best .762 winning percentage. His most productive season came in 1921, when he posted career-highs in wins (23), strikeouts (98) and innings (298.2), and led the league in shutouts (5). But his most remembered season may have been 1923 as the ace of the Yankees' staff; he posted a 21–8 record with a 3.63 ERA and led his team to their first World Series title. Jones also no-hit the Philadelphia Athletics 2-0 on September 4 at Shibe Park, in a game in which he did not record a strikeout the entire game. Only two other pitchers (Earl Hamilton and Ken Holtzman) have thrown a no-hitter with no strikeouts. Jones was 2–1 against the New York Giants in that World Series, and his crucial relief work in the final game of the Series clinched the championship for the Yankees. Like most pitchers of his time, Jones relieved as well as started, and his eight saves in 1922 led the league's relief pitchers.

Jones lost a league-high 21 games in 1925. He pitched for the Browns a year later, and was waived to Washington in 1927. With the Senators, Jones regained his form, leading his team's staff with a 17–7 record. He enjoyed his last good season in 1930, ending with a 15–7 mark. After four years of service for the White Sox, Jones retired in 1935 as the oldest active player at the time (42). His 22 consecutive seasons pitching in one league is a major league record shared with Herb Pennock, Early Wynn, Red Ruffing and Steve Carlton.

He was a better than average hitting pitcher in his career, compiling a .197 batting average (245-for-1243) with 151 runs, 6 home runs, 101 RBI and drawing 139 bases on balls.

Sad Sam Jones died at his home in Woodsfield, Ohio at the age of 73.

== Nickname ==
- "Bill McGeehan of the New York Herald-Tribune dubbed him Sad Sam because, to him, Jones looked downcast on the field. Jones told Lawrence Ritter that the reason he looked downcast was because, 'I would always wear my cap down real low over my eyes. And the sportswriters were more used to fellows like Waite Hoyt, who'd always wear their caps way up so they wouldn't miss any pretty girls'." – Ed Walton, at Baseball Library

== See also ==
- List of Major League Baseball career wins leaders
- List of Major League Baseball annual saves leaders
- List of Major League Baseball no-hitters
- The Glory of Their Times, 1966 book

Preceded by Jesse Barnes	No-hitter pitcher September 4, 1923	Succeeded by Howard Ehmke
