= Rosy Ryan =

American baseball player (1898-1980)

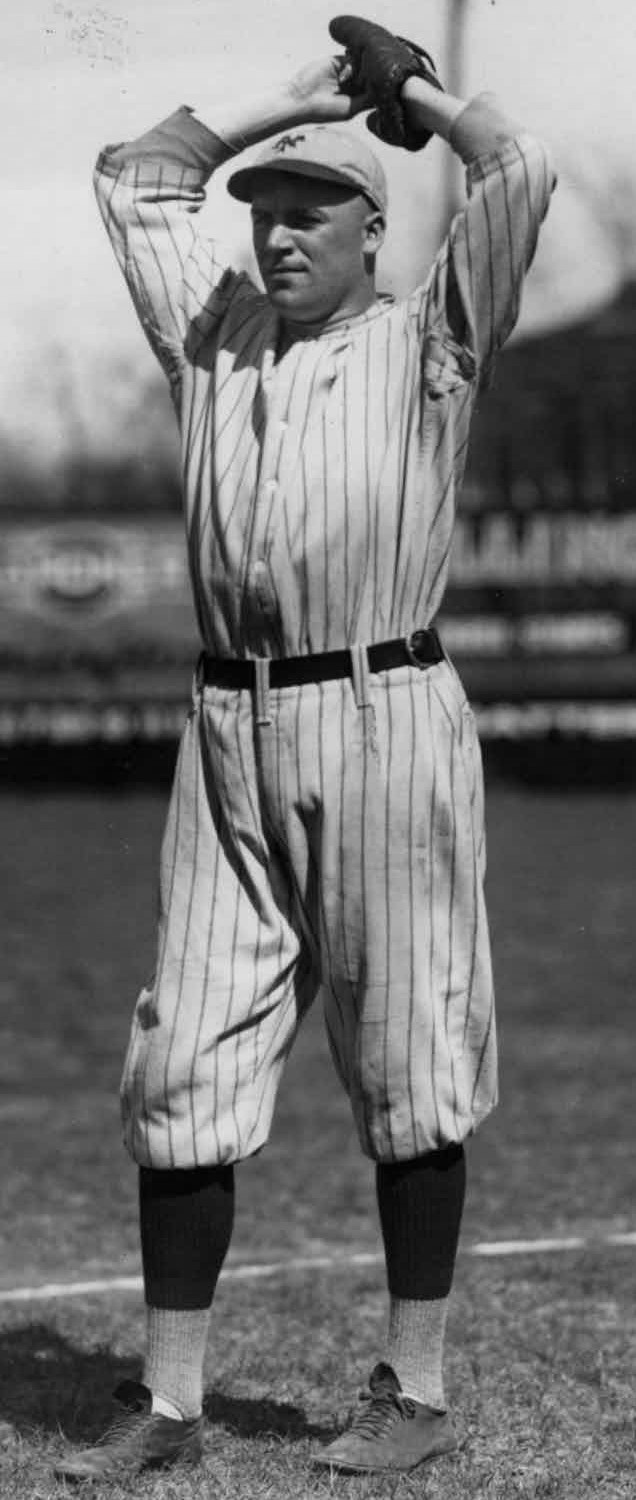
- Pitcher
- Born: March 15, 1898; Worcester, Massachusetts, U.S.
- Died: December 10, 1980 (aged 82); Scottsdale, Arizona, U.S.
- Batted: Left Threw: Right

MLB debut
- September 7, 1919, for the New York Giants

Last MLB appearance
- September 17, 1933, for the Brooklyn Dodgers

MLB statistics
- Win–loss record: 52–47
- Earned run average: 4.14
- Strikeouts: 315
- Stats at Baseball Reference

Teams
- New York Giants (1919–1924); Boston Braves (1925–1926); New York Yankees (1928); Brooklyn Dodgers (1933)

Career highlights and awards
- World Series champion (1922)

Wilfred Patrick Dolan "Rosy" Ryan (March 15, 1898 – December 10, 1980) was an American professional baseball pitcher. He played ten seasons in Major League Baseball between 1919 and 1933 for the New York Giants, Boston Braves, New York Yankees, and Brooklyn Dodgers.

== Amateur career ==
A native of Worcester, Massachusetts, Ryan attended the College of the Holy Cross. He posted a 9–2 win–loss record as a pitcher in his freshman year, and threw the school's first no-hitter, a 4–0 victory over Dartmouth at Fitton Field in 1918. Ryan graduated from Holy Cross in 1920.

== Early professional career (1919–1920) ==
Ryan went 15–8 with a 1.36 earned run average (ERA) for the Buffalo Bisons of the International League in 1919, and was called up by the New York Giants late in that season. He made his major league debut on September 7, getting the start on the mound in the second game of a doubleheader against the Boston Braves at the Polo Grounds. The game featured a pair of Baseball Hall of Famers at shortstop in Boston's Rabbit Maranville and the Giants' Frankie Frisch. Ryan twirled five innings, allowing eight hits and three earned runs, taking the loss in the Giants' 4–2 defeat. Ryan appeared in four games for the Giants that season, then had another impressive season in the International League in 1920 with the Toronto Maple Leafs, and appeared in three games for the 1920 Giants.

== Peak seasons (1921–1924) ==
Ryan became a Giants regular in 1921, appearing in 36 games, and posting a 7–10 record with a 3.73 ERA in 147.1 innings. He had an impressive three-week stretch from July 4–24, tossing four complete game wins, including a 10-inning 4–3 win against the St. Louis Cardinals and Hall of Famer Rogers Hornsby, who accounted for three of the Cards' six hits off Ryan. Despite his solid regular season performance, Ryan did not appear in the postseason as the Giants went on to claim the 1921 World Series over the New York Yankees and slugger Babe Ruth.

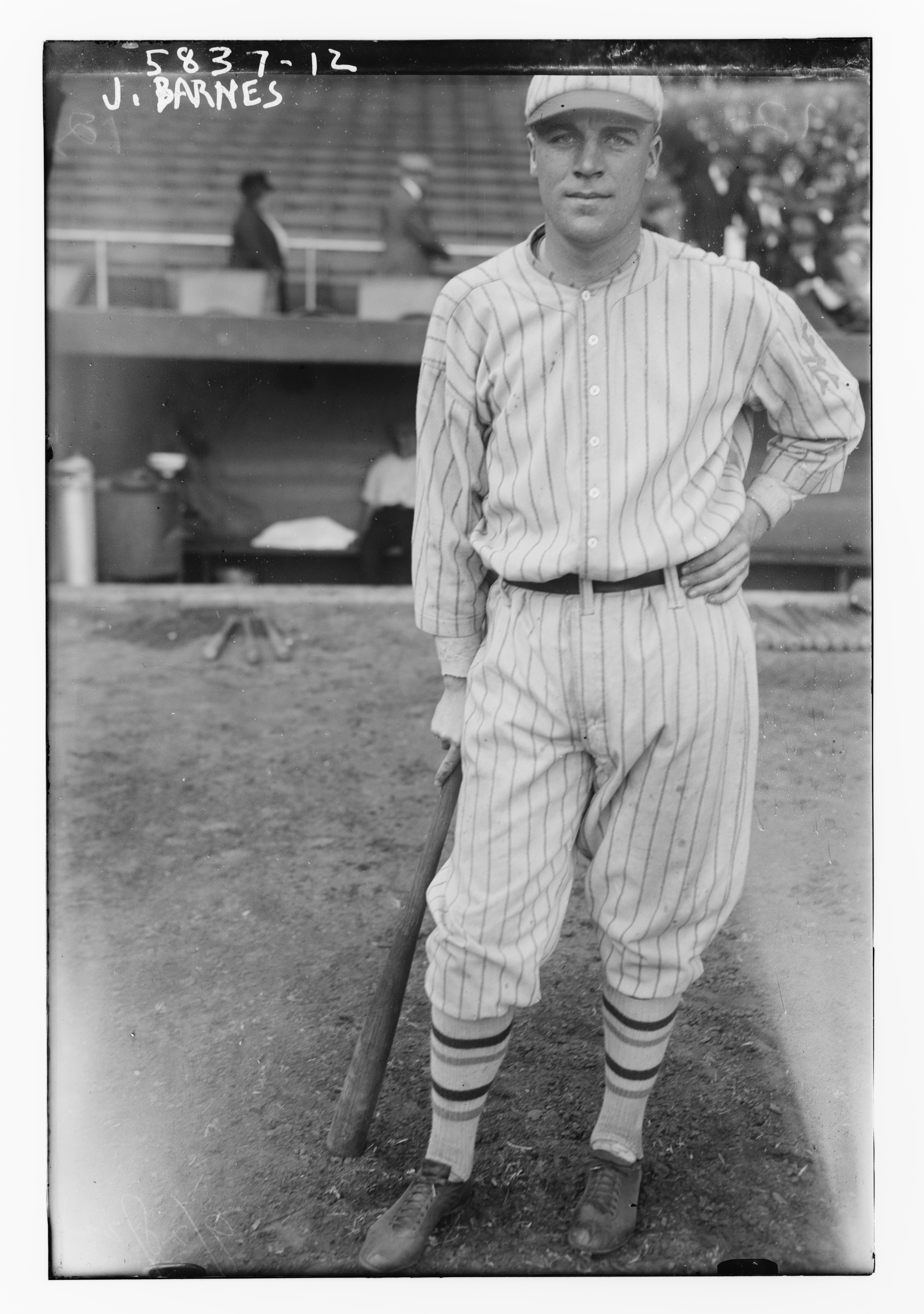
Ryan with the New York Giants in 1922

Ryan's most productive major league seasons came in 1922 and 1923. He went 17–12 and led the National League in ERA (3.01) in 1922, and went 16–5 and led the league in appearances (45) in 1923. In both years, Ryan was credited with the win in the opening game of the season's World Series.

In the 1922 World Series, the Giants again faced the Yankees, and were down 2–0 after seven innings in Game 1. Ryan came on to shut down the Yanks in the final two innings, catching Ruth looking at a third strike in the eighth. The Giants finally got to Yankee starter Bullet Joe Bush in the eighth, rallying for three runs and riding Ryan in the ninth for the 3–2 win. The Giants went on to sweep the Bronx club for their second consecutive title.

In the 1923 World Series, Giants' Game 1 starter Mule Watson allowed three Yankee runs in the first two innings, and was lifted for Ryan, who twirled the final seven innings, allowing only one additional Yankee run in the Giants' 5–4 win. Ryan was used briefly in the Giants' Game 4 loss, and then came on in relief of starter Art Nehf in Game 6. With the Yankees leading the best-of-seven series three games to two, Nehf and the Giants led the do-or-die sixth game after seven innings, 4–1. Nehf loaded the bases in the eighth and then walked in the Yankees' second run of the game. Ryan was brought in with the bases loaded and one out. He proceeded to walk Joe Dugan to force across a third Yankee run, but then with the bases still loaded, he fanned the mighty Ruth. With two down, Yankee batter Bob Meusel singled to drive in all three runners, and the Yankees took a 6–4 lead. The Giants failed to score in the bottom of the eighth, and Ryan set down the Yanks in order in the ninth, but the Giants could not rally in the final frame. Ryan took the loss, and the Yankees had their first World Series championship.

Ryan went 7–6 in 37 appearances for the 1924 Giants, and made two appearances in the Giants' seven-game World Series loss to the Washington Senators. He tossed 4.2 innings of middle relief and allowed two earned runs in New York's 6–4 Game 3 win, but his moment of glory came at the plate, as he belted a fourth-inning homer to deep right field off Senators' hurler Allen Russell. Ryan was only the second pitcher ever, and the first relief pitcher, to hit a home run in World Series play.

== Later playing career (1925–1938) ==
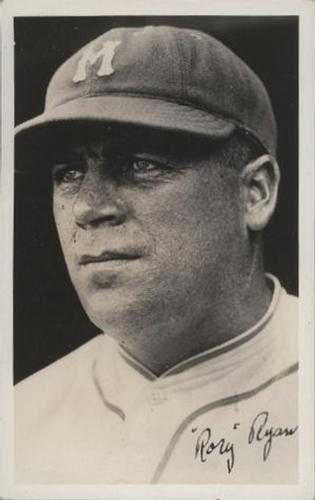
1932 cigar card depicting Ryan with the Minneapolis Millers

Ryan was traded to the Boston Braves for Tim McNamara prior to the 1925 season, and posted a lackluster 2–8 record with a 6.31 ERA in 37 appearances for Boston. He fared no better in 1926, beginning the season with a 7.58 ERA in seven appearances for Boston, before being shipped off to the minor league Toledo Mud Hens, where he toiled into the 1928 season. He joined the New York Yankees late in their 1928 season, appearing in three games and allowing 11 earned runs in six total innings. He spent the next four seasons in the minor leagues: 1929 and 1930 with the Milwaukee Brewers, 1931 back with Toledo, and 1932 with the Minneapolis Millers. In 1933, he became a major league regular again, appearing in 30 games and posting a 4.55 ERA for the Brooklyn Dodgers. He was back in Minneapolis for the 1934 through 1936 seasons, and never made another major league appearance.

In 1937 and 1938, Ryan pitched for Falmouth in the Cape Cod Baseball League. He appeared in only one game in 1937, but in 1938 was a regular contributor, using his "wide breaking curve" to help lead the team to the league title.

== Coaching career and final years ==
Ryan managed the minor league Eau Claire Bears in 1941 and 1942, and the Minneapolis Millers from 1944 to 1946. He was later a minor league general manager. Ryan was inducted to the Holy Cross Athletics Hall of Fame in 1960, and in 1961 he was presented with the King of Baseball award given by Minor League Baseball.

Ryan died in 1980 in Scottsdale, Arizona at age 82.
