= Frank Snyder =

American baseball player (1895–1962)

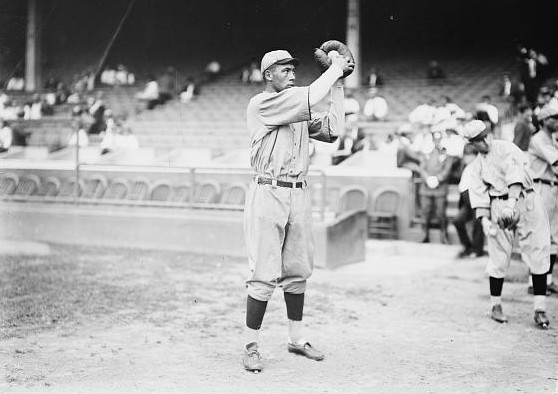
- Catcher
- Born: May 27, 1895; San Antonio, Texas, U.S.
- Died: January 5, 1962 (aged 66); San Antonio, Texas, U.S.
- Batted: Right Threw: Right

MLB debut
- August 18, 1912, for the St. Louis Cardinals

Last MLB appearance
- September 29, 1927, for the St. Louis Cardinals

MLB statistics
- Batting average: .265
- Home runs: 47
- Runs batted in: 525
- Stats at Baseball Reference

Teams
- As player: St. Louis Cardinals (1912–1919); New York Giants (1919–1926); St. Louis Cardinals (1927); As coach: New York Giants (1933–1941)

Career highlights and awards
- 3× World Series champion (1921, 1922, 1933)

Frank Elton Snyder (May 27, 1895 – January 5, 1962), was an American professional baseball player and coach. He played in Major League Baseball as a catcher from 1912 to 1927 for the New York Giants and St. Louis Cardinals. Nicknamed Pancho, Snyder was of Mexican descent on his mother's side.

== Major league career ==
Snyder began his major league career with the St. Louis Cardinals in 1912 at the age of 18. He was traded to the New York Giants in the middle of the 1919 season. Snyder was a member of John McGraw's New York Giants teams that won four consecutive National League pennants between 1921 and 1924 and played on two World Series winners in 1921 and 1922.

Snyder also homered in the final game of the 1923 World Series, but the Yankees staged a comeback to defeat the Giants.

During that period, Snyder posted a batting average above .300 three times, with a .320 average in 1921, a .343 average in 1922 and a .302 average in 1924. Snyder hit the first major league home run in the history of Braves Field in 1922. It was the first home run hit in the seven seasons played at the cavernous ballpark. In 1926, he was selected off waivers by the St. Louis Cardinals. He played for the Cardinals in 1927 before retiring at the end of the season at the age of 33.

== Career statistics ==
In a sixteen-year major league career, Snyder played in 1,392 games, accumulating 1,122 hits in 4,229 at bats for a .265 career batting average along with 44 triples, 47 home runs and 525 runs batted in. A good defensive player, his .981 career fielding average was 8 points higher than the league average over the span of his playing career. Snyder led National League catchers in fielding percentage three times: in 1914, 1923 and 1925. He also led the league twice in putouts and caught stealing percentage and, once in assists and in baserunners caught stealing. His 204 assists as a catcher in 1915 is the seventh highest single-season total in major league baseball history. His 1,332 career assists rank him 17th all-time among major league catchers.

Richard Kendall of the Society for American Baseball Research devised a study that ranked Snyder as the ninth-most dominating fielding catcher in major league history. His reputation as a defensive standout is enhanced because of the era in which he played. In the Deadball Era, catchers played a huge defensive role, given the large number of bunts and stolen base attempts, as well as the difficulty of handling the spitball pitchers who dominated pitching staffs.

== Coaching career ==
After his playing career, he served as a coach for the New York Giants, and was a minor league manager.
