= 1922 World Series =

1922 Major League Baseball championship series

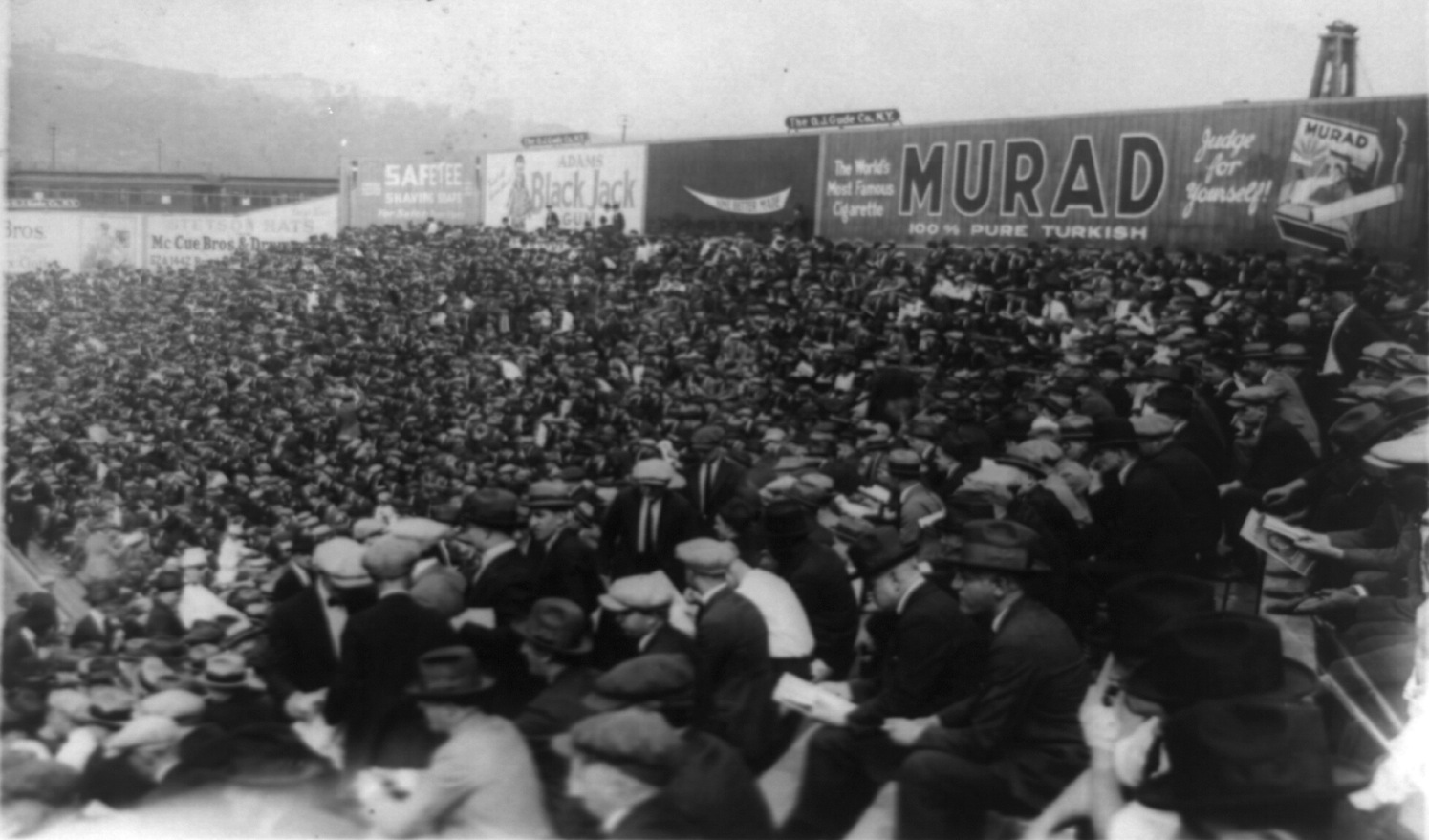
- Crowd at the Polo Grounds for Game 1
Team (Wins)	Managers	Season
New York Giants (4)	John McGraw	93–61, .604, GA: 7
New York Yankees (0)	Miller Huggins	94–60, .610, GA: 1
- Dates: October 4–8
- Venue: Polo Grounds
- Umpires: Bill Klem (NL), George Hildebrand (AL); Barry McCormick (NL), Brick Owens (AL)
- Hall of Famers: Umpire: Bill Klem; Giants: John McGraw (manager); Hughie Jennings (coach); Dave Bancroft; Frankie Frisch; George Kelly; Casey Stengel‡ Ross Youngs; Yankees: Miller Huggins (manager); Frank Baker; Babe Ruth; Waite Hoyt ‡ Elected as a manager

Broadcast
- Radio: Series coverage was carried by Westinghouse Broadcasting and available to any commercially operated radio station.
- Radio announcers: Grantland Rice and W. O. McGeehan

World Series program
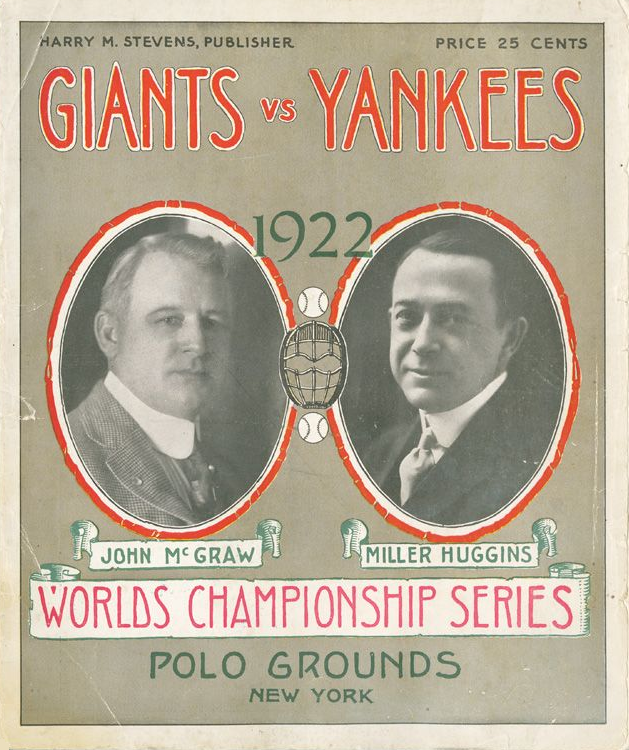

The 1922 World Series was the championship series in Major League Baseball for the 1922 season. The 19th edition of the World Series, it matched the National League (NL) champion New York Giants against the American League (AL) champion New York Yankees. The Giants beat the Yankees in five games (four games to zero, with one tie) in the first Series with a permanent best-of-seven format. By now, the term "World Series" was being used frequently, as opposed to "World's Series". As with the 1921 World Series, every game was played at the Polo Grounds because it housed both teams, with the home team alternating; it was also the Yankees' final series to be played at the Polo Grounds as a home team, as they would move into the then-under construction Yankee Stadium for the following season, which ended in them winning the rematch against the Giants.

The Giants held Babe Ruth in check (he batted only .118 with just one RBI) and scored just enough runs to win each of the games outside the controversial Game 2 tie. That game was called on account of darkness, but many thought there was sufficient light to have played some more innings (the sun was still in the sky), and there were some suspicions that one or both teams might have "allowed" the tie to happen to increase the overall gate receipts. Commissioner Landis was among those who was dissatisfied with the result. One story is that Landis asked Umpire Hildebrand, "Why the Sam Hill did you call the game?" The umpire answered, "There was a temporary haze on the field." The game decision was in the hands of the umpires, but the Commissioner's Office controlled the gate receipts. Landis ordered the money, more than $120,000, turned over to World War I charities, thus nullifying any impropriety. The tied game would turn out to be the third (and final) tied game in the history of the World Series. The other two tied games occurred in 1907 and 1912. No ties are possible under later rules, which allow for suspension of a tied game and resumption of it at a later date, as with Game 5 of the 2008 World Series.

As of 2024, this is the last time the Giants have won the World Series at home, as their next five championships were all clinched on the road. This would prove to be Giants' manager John McGraw's third and final World Series win.

== Summary ==
NL New York Giants (4) vs. AL New York Yankees (0)

Game	Date	Score	Location	Time	Attendance
1	October 4	New York Yankees – 2, New York Giants – 3	Polo Grounds	2:08	36,514
2	October 5	New York Giants – 3, New York Yankees – 3 (10)	Polo Grounds	2:40	37,020
3	October 6	New York Yankees – 0, New York Giants – 3	Polo Grounds	1:48	37,630
4	October 7	New York Giants – 4, New York Yankees – 3	Polo Grounds	1:41	36,242
5	October 8	New York Yankees – 3, New York Giants – 5	Polo Grounds	2:00	38,551

== Matchups ==
=== Game 1 ===
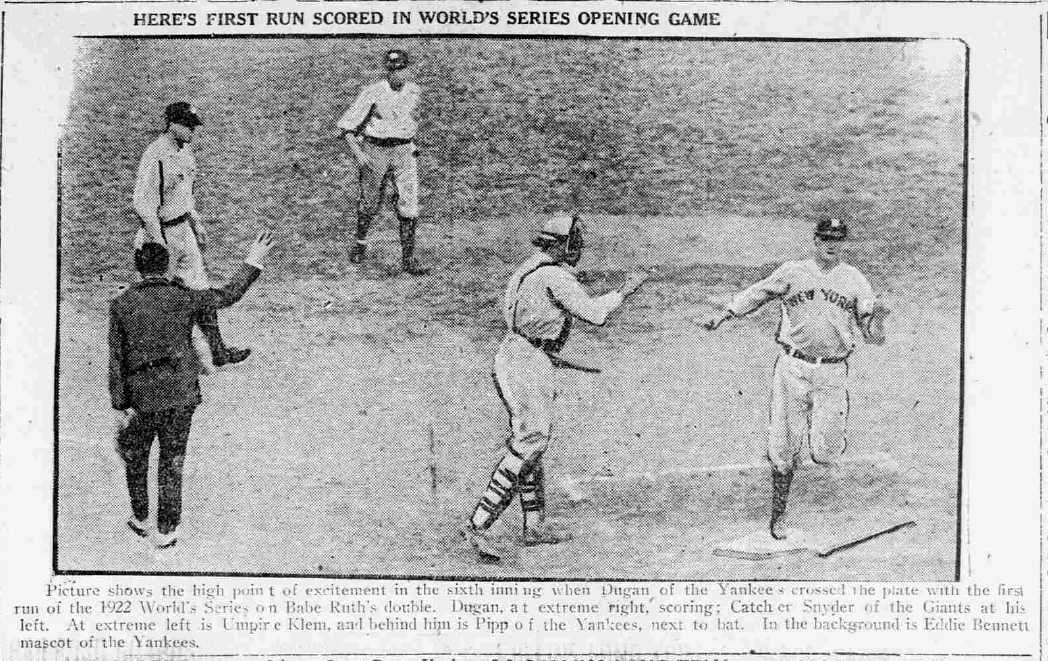
Dugan scores the first run.

Wednesday, October 4, 1922 2:00 pm (ET) at Polo Grounds in Manhattan, New York
Team	1	2	3	4	5	6	7	8	9	R	H	E
New York (AL)	0	0	0	0	0	1	1	0	0	2	7	0
New York (NL)	0	0	0	0	0	0	0	3	X	3	11	3
WP: Rosy Ryan (1–0) LP: Bullet Joe Bush (0–1)

The game and Series remained scoreless until the sixth inning. Whitey Witt tripled off of Art Nehf, then was cut down at home trying to score on a fielder's choice, but a Babe Ruth hit got the run home. The Yankees added another run next inning on Aaron Ward's sacrifice fly with runners on second and third. A three-run Giant rally in the eighth knocked out Yankee starter Bullet Joe Bush, who allowed four straight leadoff singles, the last of which to Irish Meusel scoring two. and the winning run coming off reliever Waite Hoyt on a Ross Youngs sacrifice fly.

=== Game 2 ===
Thursday, October 5, 1922 2:00 pm (ET) at Polo Grounds in Manhattan, New York
Team	1	2	3	4	5	6	7	8	9	10	R	H	E
New York (NL)	3	0	0	0	0	0	0	0	0	0	3	8	1
New York (AL)	1	0	0	1	0	0	0	1	0	0	3	8	0
Home runs: NYG: Irish Meusel (1); NYY: Aaron Ward (1)

This was the controversial tie (see above). Pitchers Bob Shawkey and Jesse Barnes went all 10 innings. The Giants scored all three runs in the first on Irish Meusel's three-run home run after two singles. The Yankees scored a run in the first on Wally Pipp's RBI single after Joe Dugan reached second on an error and another run in the fourth on Aaron Ward's home run. The Yankees had tied the game in the eighth on doubles by Babe Ruth and Bob Meusel, but that is the way the game ended.

=== Game 3 ===
Friday, October 6, 1922 2:00 pm (ET) at Polo Grounds in Manhattan, New York
Team	1	2	3	4	5	6	7	8	9	R	H	E
New York (AL)	0	0	0	0	0	0	0	0	0	0	4	1
New York (NL)	0	0	2	0	0	0	1	0	X	3	12	1
WP: Jack Scott (1–0) LP: Waite Hoyt (0–1)

Knuckleballer Jack Scott kept the Yankees off the board. In the bottom of the third with runners on second and third, Frankie Frisch's sacrifice fly and Irish Meusel's RBI single scored a run each for the Giants, who added an insurance run in the seventh on Frankie Frisch's RBI single. The game took just 1 hour, 48 minutes.

=== Game 4 ===
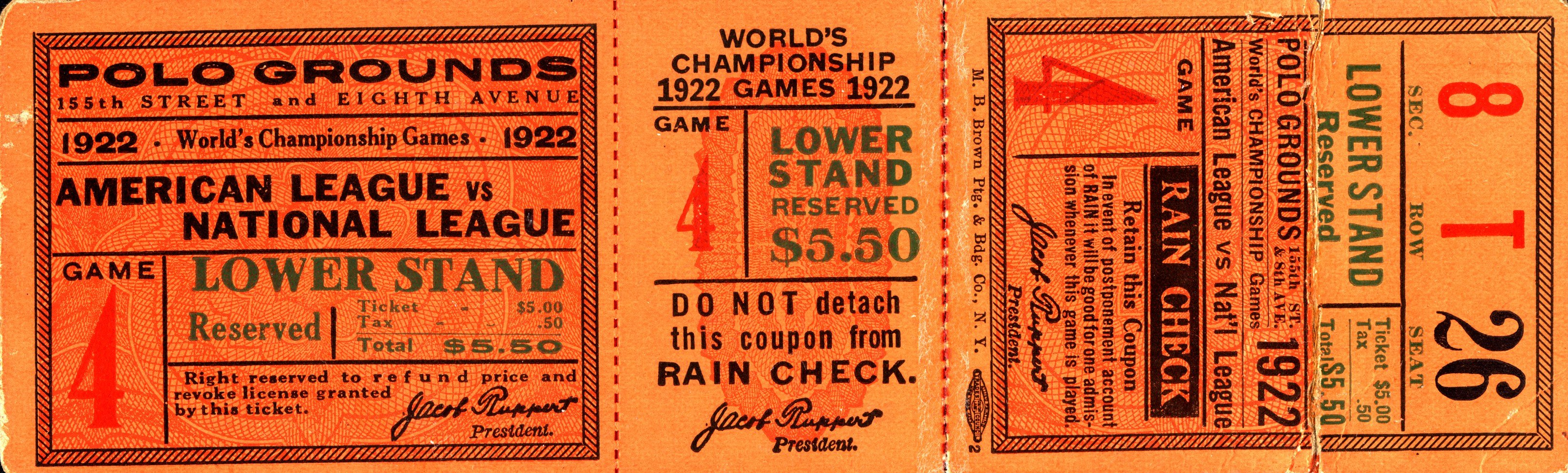
Tickets to Game 4 at the Polo Grounds.

Saturday, October 7, 1922 2:00 pm (ET) at Polo Grounds in Manhattan, New York
Team	1	2	3	4	5	6	7	8	9	R	H	E
New York (NL)	0	0	0	0	4	0	0	0	0	4	9	1
New York (AL)	2	0	0	0	0	0	1	0	0	3	8	0
WP: Hugh McQuillan (1–0) LP: Carl Mays (0–1); Home runs: NYG: None; NYY: Aaron Ward (2)

This contest moved along even faster than Game 3. It was over in a snappy 1:41, with Giants pitcher Hugh McQuillan going the distance for a 4-3 win. The Yankees scored two runs in the first on back-to-back singles by Wally Pipp and Bob Meusel, but in the fifth after a leadoff single and double, Dave Bancroft's two-run single tied the game. After a single and groundout, Irish Meusel's groundout and Ross Youngs's RBI single scored a run each. Aaron Ward's home run in the seventh cut the Giants' lead to one, but the Yankees did not score after that.

=== Game 5 ===
Sunday, October 8, 1922 2:00 pm (ET) at Polo Grounds in Manhattan, New York
Team	1	2	3	4	5	6	7	8	9	R	H	E
New York (AL)	1	0	0	0	1	0	1	0	0	3	5	0
New York (NL)	0	2	0	0	0	0	0	3	X	5	10	0
WP: Art Nehf (1–0) LP: Bullet Joe Bush (0–2)

Art Nehf's five-hit pitching combined with a three-run eighth inning won the Series for the Giants. The Yankees scored a run in the first when Joe Dugan singled with one out, moved to second on a sacrifice bunt and scored on Wally Pipp's RBI single, but in the bottom of the second with runners on second and third, Bill Cunningham's two-run single gave the Giants the lead. The Yankees tied the game in the fifth on Bullet Joe Bush's RBI single after a walk and single, then took the lead on Everett Scott's sacrifice fly with runners on second and third. The decisive rally began with a Heinie Groh single and Frankie Frisch double. After an intentional walk to Ross Youngs, a two-run single by High Pockets Kelly put the Giants on top. The next batter, Lee King, inserted in the outfield that inning for defensive purposes, delivered an RBI single to make it 5-3, and that's how it ended.

This was the second of three consecutive matchups between the Yankees and Giants (1921–1923) marked the only time (as of 2023), that three straight World Series featured the same two clubs. Brothers Bob and Irish Meusel played against each other in each of those three series, making them the first set of brothers to play against each other on opposing teams in a World Series or any Big Four championship series.

The Giants became the second NL team to win back-to-back World Series, following the Chicago Cubs in 1907–08, and remained the last until the 1975–76 Cincinnati Reds. This also remains the last World Series to be won by the Giants at home, as their championships of 1933 and 1954 (for New York) and 2010, 2012 and 2014 (for San Francisco) were all clinched as the visiting team.

== Composite line score ==
1922 World Series (4–0–1): New York Giants (N.L.) over New York Yankees (A.L.)

Team	1	2	3	4	5	6	7	8	9	10	R	H	E
New York Giants	3	2	2	0	4	0	1	6	0	0	18	50	6
New York Yankees	4	0	0	1	1	1	3	1	0	0	11	32	1
Total attendance: 185,957 Average attendance: 37,191; Winning player's share: $4,546 Losing player's share: $2,843

== See also ==
- 1921 World Series First World Series match-up between the Giants and the Yankees
- 1923 World Series Third World Series match-up between the Giants and the Yankees
- Subway Series / Giants–Yankees rivalry
