= Ross Youngs =

American baseball player (1897-1927)

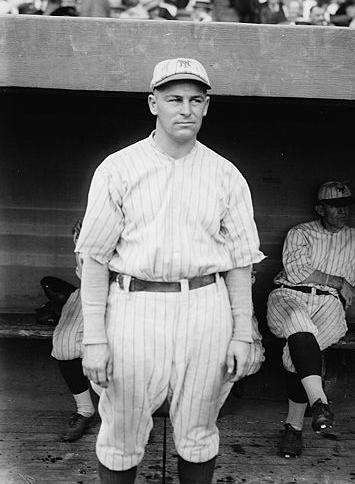
- Youngs with the Giants in 1920
- Right fielder
- Born: April 10, 1897; Shiner, Texas, U.S.
- Died: October 22, 1927 (aged 30); San Antonio, Texas, U.S.
- Batted: Left Threw: Right

MLB debut
- September 25, 1917, for the New York Giants

Last MLB appearance
- August 10, 1926, for the New York Giants

MLB statistics
- Batting average: .322
- Home runs: 42
- Runs batted in: 592
- Stats at Baseball Reference

Teams
- New York Giants (1917–1926)

Career highlights and awards
- 2× World Series champion (1921, 1922)

Member of the National

Baseball Hall of Fame
- Induction: 1972
- Election method: Veterans Committee

Ross Middlebrook "Pep" Youngs (April 10, 1897 – October 22, 1927) was an American professional baseball player. Nicknamed "Pep", he played ten seasons in Major League Baseball for the New York Giants from 1917 through 1926, playing right field almost exclusively. Youngs was a part of the Giants teams that won four consecutive National League pennants and the 1921 and 1922 World Series.

From Shiner, Texas, Youngs excelled at baseball and American football at the West Texas Military Institute. After beginning his professional career in minor league baseball, Youngs was signed by the Giants in 1916. Youngs had a lifetime .322 batting average with the Giants and batted over .300 nine times in his career, including eight consecutive seasons. His career was cut short by illness, however, as he died at the age of 30 of Bright's disease.

Youngs was elected to the Baseball Hall of Fame in 1972 by the Veterans Committee. His election was not without controversy, however, as the Veterans Committee consisted of his former teammates, and charges of cronyism were leveled against the committee.

== Early life and minor leagues ==
Youngs was born in Shiner, Texas, the second of three children, all sons. His father was a railroad worker, but suffered disability and moved his family to San Antonio where he worked as a rancher. Youngs' mother ran a small hotel in San Antonio and Youngs had a paper route.

Youngs was educated at West Texas Military Institute. He received offers for scholarships to play college football but passed on these, as he preferred baseball. He made his professional baseball debut for the Austin Senators of the Texas League in 1914. Appearing in 17 games, he hit just .145 for the class-B Senators and, in 1915, found himself down in the Class-D leagues, playing for Brenham of the Middle Texas League and the Waxahachie Athletics of the Central Texas League; both leagues disbanded during the season. In 1916, playing in the infield for the Sherman Lions of the Class-D Western Association, he hit .362 as a switch-hitter, drawing the attention of the New York Giants, who purchased his contract in August for $2,000 ($59,174 in current dollar terms).

== New York Giants ==
Youngs reported to spring training in Marlin, Texas with the Giants in 1917. They initially assigned him to the Rochester Hustlers, a team in the International League with which the Giants had a working relationship. Giants manager John McGraw told Mickey Doolan, the manager of the Hustlers, "I'm giving you one of the greatest players I've ever seen. Play him in the outfield. If anything happens to him, I'm holding you responsible." In 140 games with Rochester, Youngs hit .356, earning himself a late-season promotion to the big league club. McGraw gave Youngs the nickname "Pep" due to his hustle and soon began to groom Youngs to become his successor as Giants' manager.

Youngs made his major league debut on September 25 and played in seven of the last nine games of the season for the eventual National League (NL) pennant-winners: six in center field and one in right. In those seven games he went 9-for-26 (.346) with two doubles and three triples. In 1918, regular Giants right fielder Dave Robertson left the team to manage a local military ballclub, and Youngs was given the full-time job out of spring training. Batting exclusively left-handed, Youngs responded by batting .302 in 121 games, finishing sixth in the league. It would be the first of seven straight seasons in which he hit .300 as a regular, and the second of eight overall counting his brief stint in 1917. He also finished sixth in the NL with a .368 on-base percentage (OBP). The next season Robertson was traded to the Chicago Cubs for pitcher Phil Douglas, leaving Youngs to become a fixture in right field for the Giants. Youngs finished third in the NL in 1919 with a .311 batting average. His .351 batting average in 1920 was second in the NL to Rogers Hornsby.

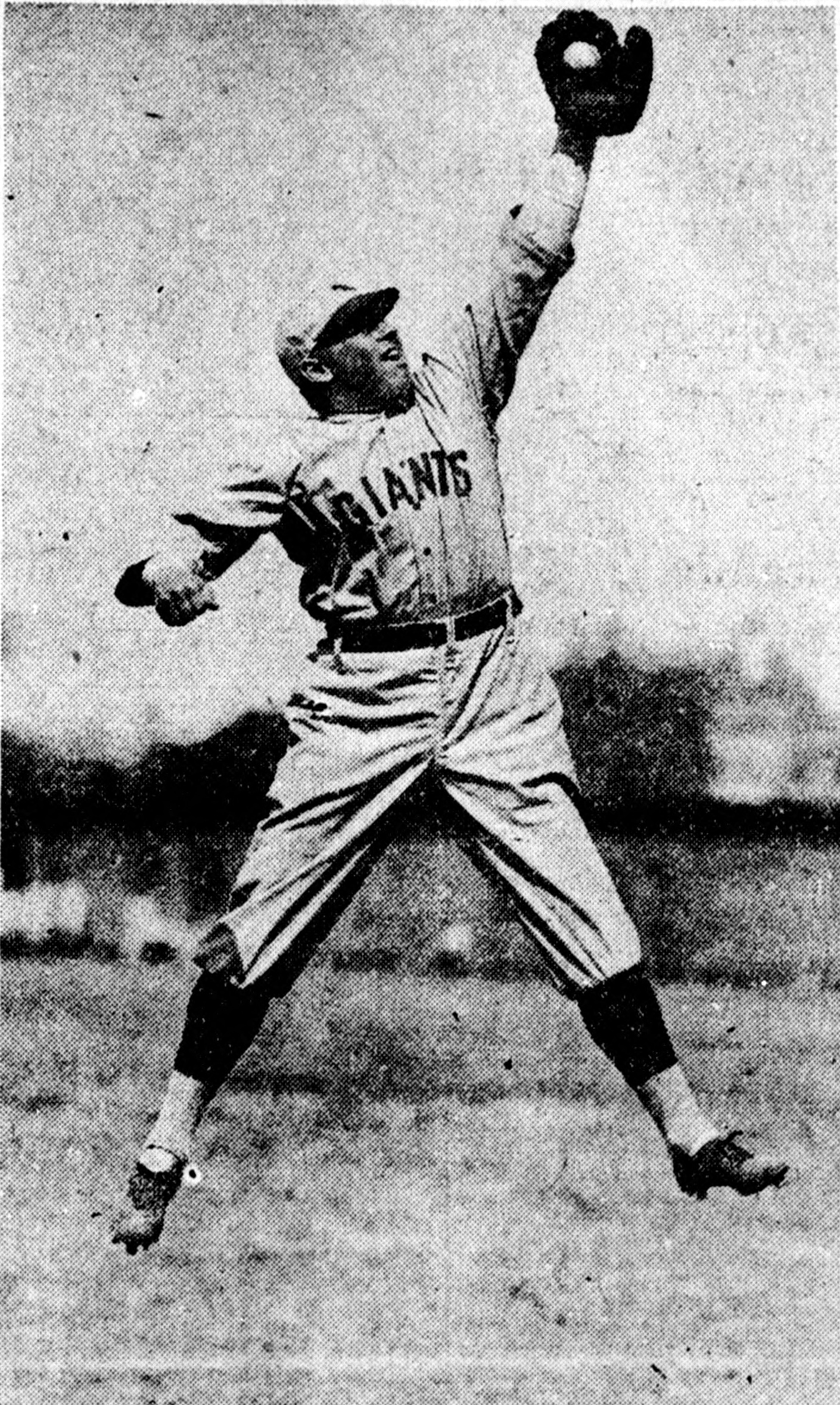
Catching a ball in 1922

Youngs batted .327 in 1921, good for ninth in the NL. In Game 3 of the 1921 World Series Youngs became the first player to record two hits in the same inning of a World Series game. The Giants defeated the New York Yankees as Youngs batted .280 in the series. Youngs hit for the cycle on April 29, 1922. He finished the regular season ninth in the NL in OBP (.398) and tied for ninth in stolen bases (17), proceeding to hit .375 in the 1922 World Series as the Giants again defeated the Yankees. Youngs led the NL in runs scored in 1923, with 121, and his .348 batting average was the eighth best in the league. Youngs batted .356 in the 1923 World Series, which the Giants lost to the Yankees.

Youngs batted .356 during the 1924 season, finishing third in the NL. In the final series of this season, the Giants were playing the Philadelphia Phillies at the Polo Grounds and battling for the pennant with the Brooklyn Dodgers. Jimmy O'Connell, an outfielder for the Giants, offered Phillies shortstop Heinie Sand $500 to intentionally lose the games ($9,393 in current dollar terms). Sand rejected the bribe and reported it to Phillies manager Art Fletcher. It eventually led to the lifetime suspension of O'Connell and Giants coach Crazy Dolan by Commissioner Kenesaw Mountain Landis. O'Connell implicated teammates Youngs, George Kelly, and Frankie Frisch as co-conspirators; Landis, however, cleared the trio of any wrongdoing.

Youngs slumped to a .185 batting average during the 1924 World Series, which the Giants lost to the Washington Senators. Continuing to struggle in 1925, Youngs batted .264, his only season with a batting average below .300, but improved to .306 in 95 games during the 1926 season. Toward the end of his career, Youngs taught Mel Ott, his eventual successor, how to play right field in the Polo Grounds.

== Illness and death ==
Youngs's career was abruptly cut short in 1926, when he was diagnosed with the kidney disorder that, at the time, was called Bright's disease. He had been exposed to streptococcal infection in 1924. Too ill to play after August 10, 1926, Youngs returned home on McGraw's insistence and received a blood transfusion in March 1927.

Youngs died of Bright's disease on October 22, 1927, at the age of 30. He went from weighing 170 pounds (77 kg) during his playing career to 100 pounds (45 kg) by the time of his death. In Youngs' obituary in The New York Times, Giants manager John McGraw called Youngs "the greatest outfielder I ever saw on a ball field." The Giants honored Youngs with a bronze plaque on the right field wall of the Polo Grounds; although the Giants intended to pay for it, fans expressed their desire to contribute and, even though contributions were limited to $1 per person, donations paid for the plaque entirely.

== Legacy ==
Over his ten-year career, Youngs posted 812 runs, 42 home runs, 592 runs batted in (RBI), 153 stolen bases, .322 career batting average, .399 on-base percentage and .441 slugging percentage. He batted .300 or higher in every season until 1925, and higher than .350 twice. Youngs scored 100 or more runs three times and posted a career-high 102 RBI in 1921 and 10 home runs in 1924. During his tenure with the team, the Giants went to the World Series four consecutive years (1921–1924) and won twice (1921, 1922). Youngs was a favorite of McGraw, who kept only two pictures in his office: one of Christy Mathewson and one of Youngs. Rosy Ryan, a teammate with the Giants, and Burleigh Grimes, who played against Youngs as a member of the Brooklyn Dodgers, considered Youngs the best player they ever saw.

Youngs was included in the inaugural balloting for the National Baseball Hall of Fame in 1936, but received less than 5% of the vote from the Baseball Writers' Association of America (BBWAA). Youngs remained on the ballot every year through 1956, receiving his highest vote total in 1947 with 22%. Ford C. Frick, Commissioner of Baseball, and former teammate Bill Terry both championed Youngs' candidacy.

Former Giants teammates Terry and Frankie Frisch joined the Veterans Committee in 1967 and aided the elections of several of their former teammates, including Youngs in 1972. In addition to Youngs, Terry and Frisch shepherded the selections of Giants teammates Jesse Haines in 1970, Dave Bancroft and Chick Hafey in 1971, George Kelly in 1973, Jim Bottomley in 1974, and Freddie Lindstrom in 1976. Youngs died at the earliest age of any current Hall of Famer. Youngs is the only member of the National Baseball Hall of Fame from San Antonio and was inducted into the San Antonio Sports Hall of Fame in 1998. Shiner, the town in which Youngs was born, hosted a baseball tournament in his honor at Clipper Field from 2001 through 2003.

Youngs' selection, along with some of the other selections made by Terry and Frisch, has been considered one of the weakest in some circles. According to the BBWAA, the Veterans Committee was not selective enough in choosing members, and charges of cronyism were later leveled against the committee. This led to the Veterans Committee having its powers reduced in subsequent years. Baseball statistician Bill James recognized this and wrote that Youngs does not belong in the Hall of Fame. In 1981, however, Lawrence Ritter and Donald Honig included Youngs in their book The 100 Greatest Baseball Players of All Time. They explained what they called "the Smoky Joe Wood Syndrome", where a player of truly exceptional talent but a career curtailed by injury or illness should still – in spite of not owning career statistics that would quantitatively rank him with the all-time greats – be included on their list of the 100 greatest players.

== Personal life ==
Youngs married Dorothy Pienecke, a woman from Brooklyn whom he met while vacationing in the Berkshires, in October 1924. Their daughter Caroline was born in December 1925. Dorothy feuded with Youngs' mother, however, and the couple separated before the birth of Caroline, whom he never met. Youngs was considered friendly and generous, loaned money constantly, and was reportedly owed $16,000 at the time of his death ($296,552 in current dollar terms). Youngs enjoyed playing golf and was considered the best golfer in the major leagues.

== See also ==
- List of baseball players who died during their careers
- List of Major League Baseball players to hit for the cycle
- List of Major League Baseball career stolen bases leaders
- List of Major League Baseball annual runs scored leaders
- List of Major League Baseball annual doubles leaders
- List of Major League Baseball players who spent their entire career with one franchise

Preceded by Dave Robertson	Hitting for the cycle April 29, 1922	Succeeded by Jimmy Johnston
