= Bill Cunningham (outfielder) =

American baseball player (1894-1953)

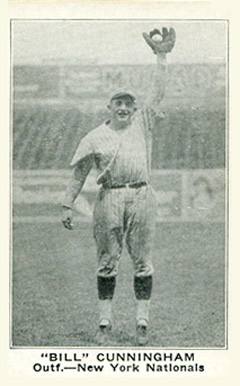
- Outfielder
- Born: July 30, 1894; San Francisco, California, U.S.
- Died: September 26, 1953 (aged 59); Colusa, California, U.S.
- Batted: Right Threw: Right

MLB debut
- July 14, 1921, for the New York Giants

Last MLB appearance
- September 28, 1924, for the Boston Braves

MLB statistics
- Batting average: .286
- Home runs: 9
- Runs batted in: 112
- Stats at Baseball Reference

Teams
- New York Giants (1921–1923); Boston Braves (1924)

Career highlights and awards
- World Series champion (1922)

William Aloysius Cunningham (July 30, 1894 – September 26, 1953) was an American professional baseball player who played outfield in Major League Baseball from 1921 to 1924. He would play for the Boston Braves and New York Giants.

Cunningham's two-run single in the second inning of the 1922 World Series' final game sparked the Giants to a 5–3 victory over the New York Yankees at the Polo Grounds and the championship. A year later, a Cunningham hit in the final game of the 1923 World Series put the Giants on top, but the Yankees rallied to win it.

He played just four seasons in the majors overall, getting 270 hits in 945 at-bats and batting .286. He compiled 9 home runs and 112 RBI. In eight World Series games, he hit only .176 (3-17) with three RBI.
