= Buddy Crump =

American baseball player (1901–1976)

- Center fielder
- Born: November 29, 1901; Norfolk, Virginia, U.S.
- Died: September 26, 1976 (aged 74); Raleigh, North Carolina, U.S.
- Batted: Left Threw: Left

MLB debut
- September 28, 1924, for the New York Giants

Last MLB appearance
- September 28, 1924, for the New York Giants

MLB statistics
- Games played: 1
- At bats: 4
- Hits: 0
- Stats at Baseball Reference

Teams
- New York Giants (1924)

Arthur Elliot Crump (November 29, 1901 – September 26, 1976) was an American Major League Baseball center fielder who played in one game for the New York Giants in 1924.
