= Ernie Maun =

American baseball player (1901-1987)

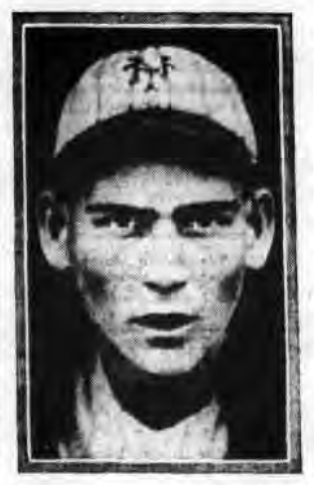
- Pitcher
- Born: February 3, 1901; Clearwater, Kansas
- Died: January 1, 1987 (aged 85); Corpus Christi, Texas
- Batted: Right Threw: Right

MLB debut
- May 16, 1924, for the New York Giants

Last MLB appearance
- June 11, 1926, for the Philadelphia Phillies

MLB statistics
- Win–loss record: 3–5
- Earned run average: 6.19
- Strikeouts: 14
- Stats at Baseball Reference

Teams
- New York Giants (1924); Philadelphia Phillies (1926)

Ernest Gerald Maun (February 3, 1901 – January 1, 1987) was a Major League Baseball pitcher who played for the New York Giants in 1924 and the Philadelphia Phillies in 1926.
