= Jimmy O'Connell (baseball) =

American baseball player (1901-1976)

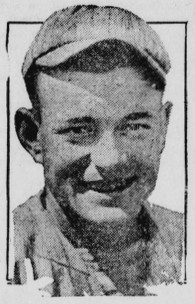
- Outfielder
- Born: February 11, 1901; Sacramento, California
- Died: November 11, 1976 (aged 75); Bakersfield, California
- Batted: Left Threw: Right

MLB debut
- April 17, 1923, for the New York Giants

Last MLB appearance
- September 28, 1924, for the New York Giants

MLB statistics
- Batting average: .270
- Home runs: 8
- Runs batted in: 57
- Stats at Baseball Reference

Teams
- New York Giants (1923–1924)

James Joseph O'Connell (February 11, 1901 – November 11, 1976) was an outfielder in Major League Baseball.

== Biography ==
O'Connell was born in Sacramento, California. He started his professional baseball career in the Pacific Coast League at the age of 18. Playing for the San Francisco Seals, O'Connell batted over .330 in 1921 and 1922; he was then purchased by the New York Giants for $75,000 ($1,417,236 in current dollar terms). He served as a backup outfielder for the Giants in 1923 and 1924.

In the final series of the 1924 season, the Giants were playing the Philadelphia Phillies at the Polo Grounds and battling for the pennant with the Brooklyn Dodgers. O'Connell offered Phillies shortstop Heinie Sand $500 to throw the games ($9,393 in current dollar terms). Sand rejected the bribe and reported it to Phillies manager Art Fletcher. It eventually led to the life-time suspension of O'Connell and Giants coach Cozy Dolan by Commissioner Landis, although future-Hall of Famers Frankie Frisch, George Kelly, and Ross Youngs were also implicated. O'Connell would be the last active major leaguer to be banned for gambling until Tucupita Marcano in 2024.

In 139 games over two seasons, O'Connell posted a .270 batting average (96-for-356) with 66 runs, 8 home runs, 57 RBIs and 45 bases on balls. Defensively, he recorded a .974 fielding percentage.

O’Connell was reinstated by Commissioner Rob Manfred on May 13, 2025, along with other deceased players who were on the ineligible list.

== See also ==
- List of people banned from Major League Baseball
