= Claude Jonnard =

American baseball player (1897–1959)

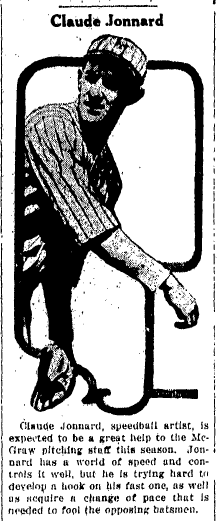
- Pitcher
- Born: November 23, 1897; Nashville, Tennessee, U.S.
- Died: August 27, 1959 (aged 61); Nashville, Tennessee, U.S.
- Batted: Right Threw: Right

MLB debut
- October 1, 1921, for the New York Giants

Last MLB appearance
- July 11, 1929, for the Chicago Cubs

MLB statistics
- Win–loss record: 14–12
- Earned run average: 3.79
- Strikeouts: 160
- Stats at Baseball Reference

Teams
- New York Giants (1921–1924); St. Louis Browns (1926); Chicago Cubs (1929)

Claude Alfred Jonnard (November 23, 1897 – August 27, 1959) was an American professional baseball player. He was a right-handed pitcher over parts of six seasons (1921–1924, 1926, 1929) with the New York Giants, St. Louis Browns and Chicago Cubs. For his career, he compiled a 14–12 record in 137 appearances, most as a relief pitcher, with a 3.79 earned run average and 160 strikeouts. Jonnard was a member of the Giants National League pennant-winning teams in 1923 and 1924, losing both World Series (to the New York Yankees and Washington Senators, respectively). In World Series play, he made three relief appearances, giving up no runs.

Jonnard was born and later died in Nashville, Tennessee at the age of 61. His twin brother, Bubber Jonnard, was a Major League catcher and coach.

== See also ==
- List of Major League Baseball annual saves leaders
