= Heinie Sand =

American baseball player (1897–1958)

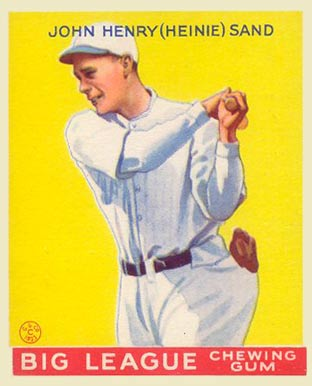
- Shortstop
- Born: July 3, 1897; San Francisco, California, U.S.
- Died: November 3, 1958 (aged 61); San Francisco, California, U.S.
- Batted: Right Threw: Right

MLB debut
- April 17, 1923, for the Philadelphia Phillies

Last MLB appearance
- September 30, 1928, for the Philadelphia Phillies

MLB statistics
- Batting average: .258
- Home runs: 18
- Runs batted in: 251
- Stats at Baseball Reference

Teams
- Philadelphia Phillies (1923–1928)

John Henry "Heinie" Sand (July 3, 1897 – November 3, 1958) was an American shortstop in Major League Baseball who played from 1923 to 1928 with the Philadelphia Phillies. He debuted on April 17, 1923 and played his final game on September 30, 1928. In 1925, he had a .364 on-base percentage and 55 runs batted in and was 18th in the voting for the National League's Most Valuable Player Award. Over six season, he played in 848 games, including 772 at shortstop. For his career, he hit for a .258 average with a .343 on-base percentage.

Born in San Francisco, California, Sand got his start playing for the Salt Lake City Bees of the Pacific Coast League from 1918 to 1922. Sand had an unassisted triple play while playing for Salt Lake City.

Sand is best known for his role in a 1924 bribery incident that resulted in two players being banned from baseball by Commissioner Kenesaw Mountain Landis. Sand knew New York Giants player Jimmy O'Connell from their days in San Francisco. On September 23, the Phillies were out of contention, and O'Connell offered to pay $500 to Sand if he would "go easy" on the Giants. The incident came to the attention of Judge Landis, who conducted a hearing. O'Connell admitted making the offer and implicated Giants coach Cozy Dolan in the scheme. Landis banned both O'Connell and Dolan from baseball.

Sand was involved as a shortstop in three triple plays in his career. In July 1924, Sand was involved in a triple play on a ball hit by Heinie Groh.

In 1929, Sand was acquired by the Rochester Red Wings of the International League. After playing one year in Rochester, Sand was sold to the Baltimore Orioles in November 1929. Sand played for the Orioles for four years from 1930 to 1933. He finished his career in 1934 playing for San Francisco's Mission Reds in the Pacific Coast League.

The statistic that stands out above all others with Sand was his propensity to strike out. He was among the top 10 batters in strikeouts in all six of his major league seasons, striking out 56 times in his rookie season in 1923 (5th highest in the National League (NL)), 57 in 1924 (3rd highest in the NL), 65 in 1925 (2nd highest in the NL), 56 in 1926 (6th highest in the NL), 59 in 1927 (3rd highest in the NL), and 49 in his final season in 1928 (9th highest in the NL).

Sand was also a leader in bases on balls, walking 82 times in 1923 (2nd in the NL), 52 times in 1924 (10th in the NL), 64 times in 1925 (6th in the NL), and 66 times in 1926 (2nd in the NL).

Sand also was third in runs scored in the National League in 1926, with 99. Sand belongs to that small group of players who always had at least 120 games and 400+ at bats in every major league season played.

After retiring from baseball, Sand became involved in the plumbing business. He was a member of one of the oldest plumbing contracting companies in San Francisco.

In November 1958, Sand died at age 61 at St. Mary's Hospital in San Francisco.
