= Cozy Dolan (1910s outfielder) =

American baseball player (1882–1958)

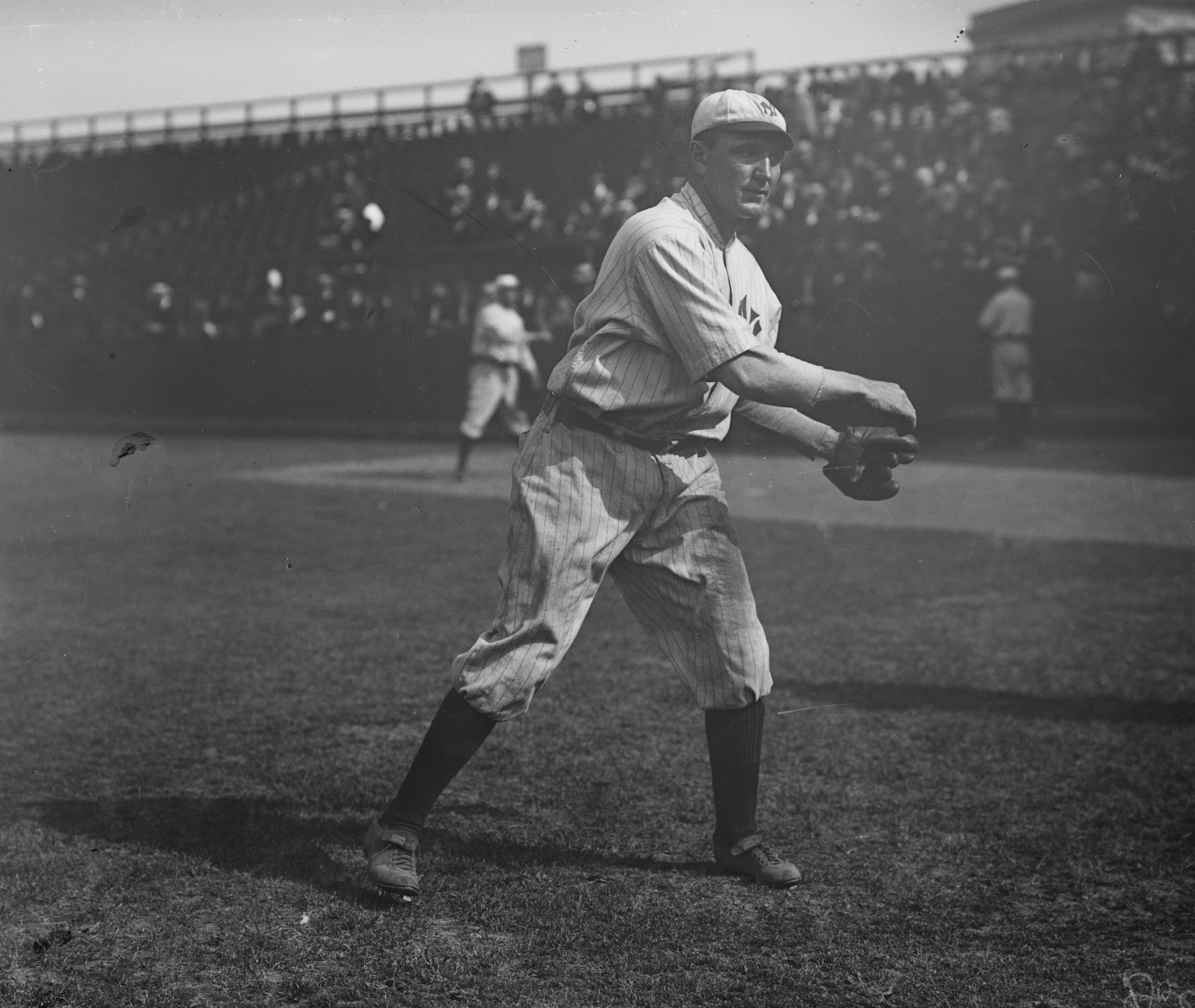
- Dolan in 1912
- Outfielder
- Born: December 23, 1889; Oshkosh, Wisconsin, U.S.
- Died: December 10, 1958 (aged 68); Chicago, Illinois, U.S.
- Batted: Right Threw: Right

MLB debut
- August 15, 1909, for the Cincinnati Reds

Last MLB appearance
- July 7, 1922, for the New York Giants

MLB statistics
- Batting average: .252
- Home runs: 6
- Runs batted in: 111
- Stats at Baseball Reference

Teams
- Cincinnati Reds (1909); New York Highlanders (1911–1912); Philadelphia Phillies (1912–1913); Pittsburgh Pirates (1913); St. Louis Cardinals (1914–1915); New York Giants (1922)

Albert J. "Cozy" Dolan (born James Alberts; December 23, 1889 – December 10, 1958) was an American Major League Baseball player. The 5 ft 10 in (1.78 m), 160-pound (73 kg) outfielder and third baseman played for six teams; the Cincinnati Reds (1909), the New York Highlanders (1911–1912), the Philadelphia Phillies (1912–1913), the Pittsburgh Pirates (1913), the St. Louis Cardinals (1914–1915) and the New York Giants (1922). Over his career he posted career numbers of 299 hits, 210 runs, 102 stolen bases, a .339 slugging percentage, and a .252 batting average.

In the final series of the 1924 season, the Giants were playing the Philadelphia Phillies at the Polo Grounds and battling for the pennant with the Brooklyn Dodgers. Giants outfielder Jimmy O'Connell offered Phillies shortstop Heinie Sand $500 to throw the games. Sand rejected the bribe and reported it to Phillies manager Art Fletcher. It eventually led to the lifetime suspension of O'Connell and Dolan, who was a coach for the Giants, by Commissioner Landis, although future-Hall of Famers Frankie Frisch, George Kelly, and Ross Youngs were also implicated.

Dolan was reinstated by Commissioner Rob Manfred on May 13, 2025, along with other deceased players who were on the ineligible list.

== Personal life ==
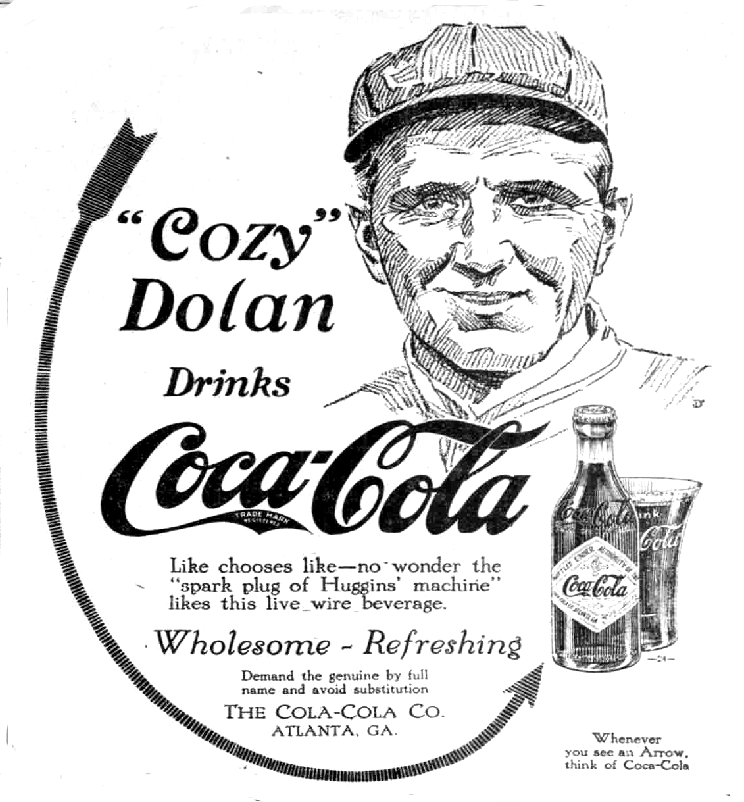
Coca-Cola ad from 1915 with Dolan

Dolan was born in Oshkosh, Wisconsin, on December 23, 1889, to James T. and Bridget (Joyce) Dolan. He was the youngest of 7 children. His birth record indicates he was named Alvin, but a 1911 newspaper report says, "Albert J Dolan, commonly known and called as Alvin Dolan... ." He records his name as Albert James Dolan on his World War I draft registration card.

On January 2, 1907, Albert J. Dolan married Georgia Simpson, daughter of Douglas J. and Mary (Abrams) Simpson, in Oshkosh, Wisconsin. The couple frequently wintered in Oshkosh during Cozy's off season.

The city of Oshkosh was very proud of their native son and local papers assiduously followed his career. Articles such as the following were common:

Alvin Dolan, the Oshkosh young man who formerly played with the Oshkosh team in the Wisconsin state league and the W-1 league, and is now playing third base with Jersey City in the Eastern league, makes the eastern fans sit up by clouting the ball.

— "PLAYS WINNING BALL." Alvin Dolan Makes Home Run and Brings Victory to Jersey City Over Newark., The Daily Northwestern (Oshkosh, Wisconsin), June 2, 1911

Cozy Dolan died December 10, 1958, in his hometown of Chicago.
