= Mule Watson =

American baseball player (1896–1949)

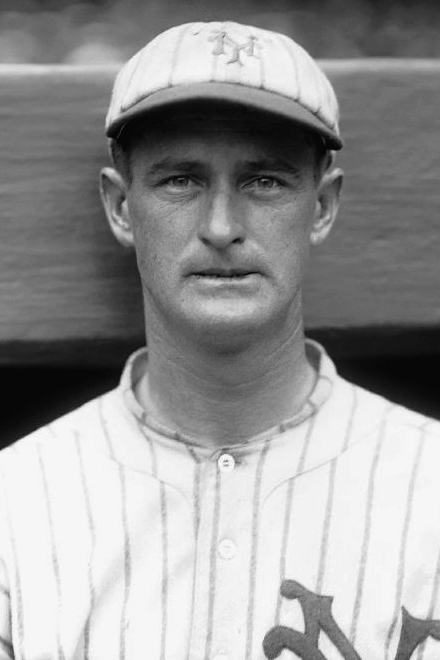
- Pitcher
- Born: October 15, 1896; Arizona, Louisiana, U.S.
- Died: August 25, 1949 (aged 52); Shreveport, Louisiana, U.S.
- Batted: Right Threw: Right

MLB debut
- July 4, 1918, for the Philadelphia Athletics

Last MLB appearance
- September 18, 1924, for the New York Giants

MLB statistics
- Win–loss record: 50–53
- Earned run average: 4.03
- Strikeouts: 208
- Stats at Baseball Reference

Teams
- Philadelphia Athletics (1918–1919); Boston Braves (1920–1923); Pittsburgh Pirates (1920); New York Giants (1923–1924)

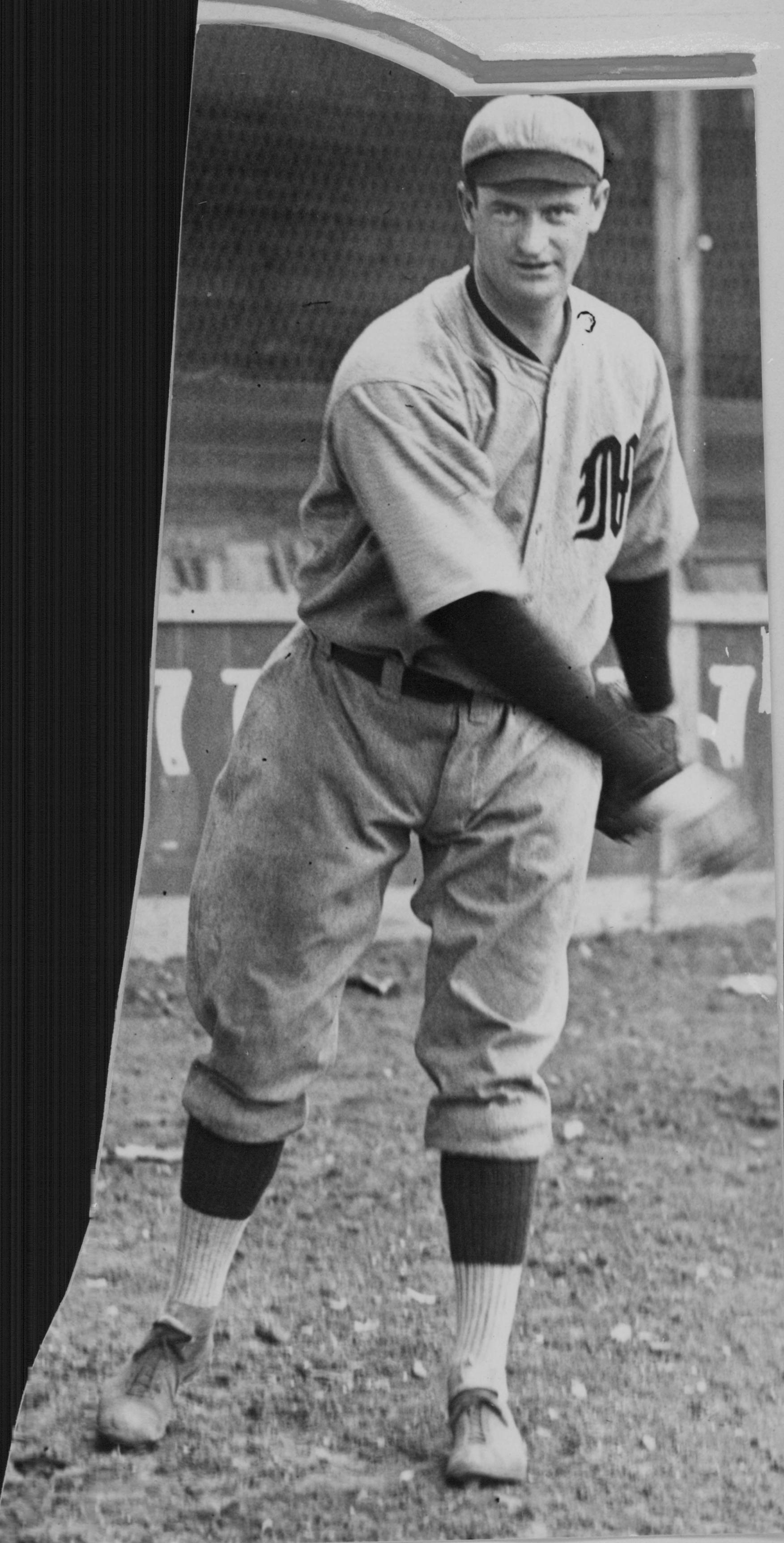
Watson with the minor league Minneapolis Millers, 1920s

John Reaves "Mule" Watson (October 15, 1896 – August 25, 1949) was an American professional baseball player who was a pitcher in the Major Leagues from 1918 to 1924. He played for the Boston Braves, Philadelphia Athletics, Pittsburgh Pirates, and New York Giants. On the 12th and 13 August 1921, Watson became the last pitcher in Major League history to start both games of a doubleheader twice in the same season.
