= Irish Meusel =

American baseball player (1893–1963)

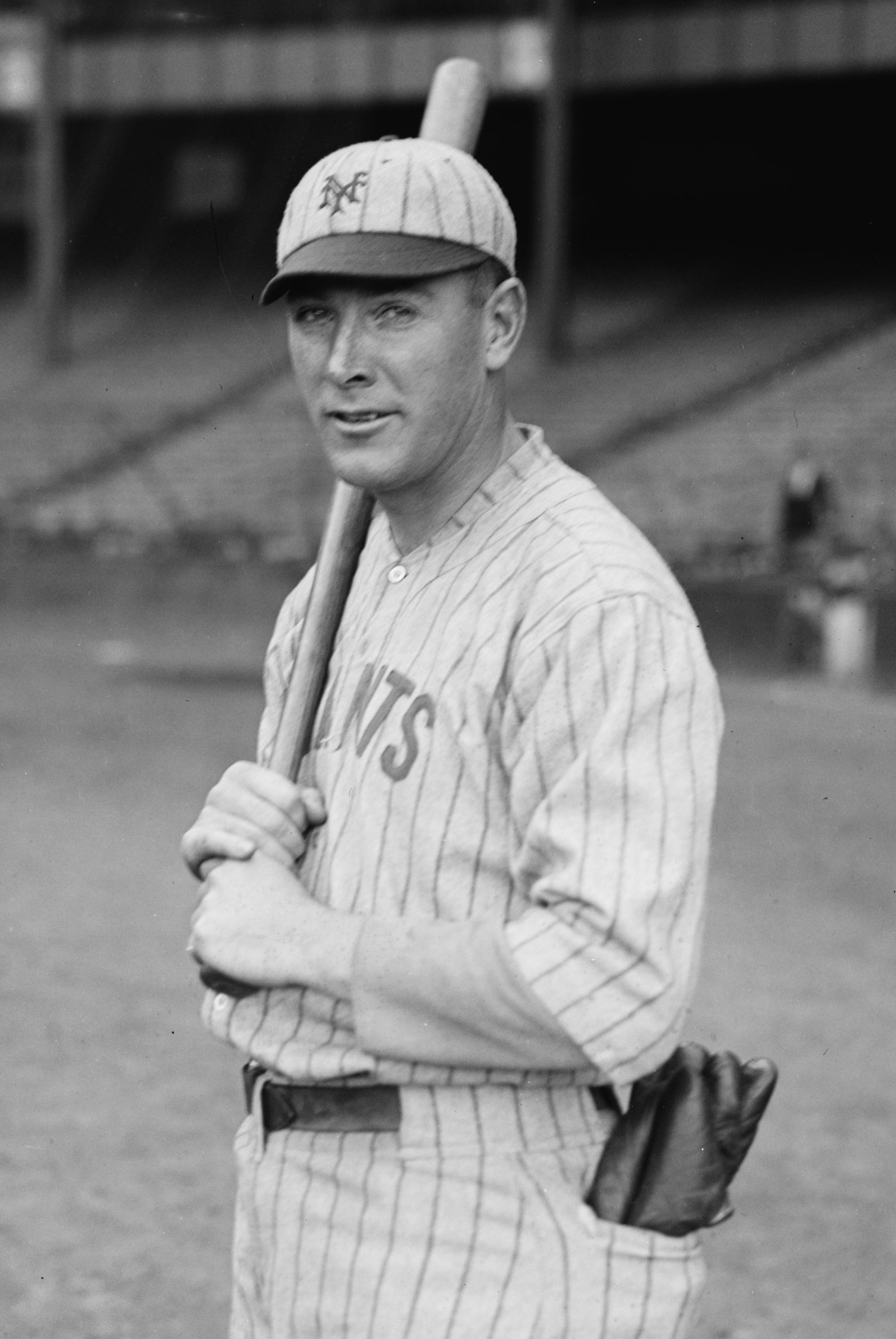
- Left fielder
- Born: June 9, 1893; Oakland, California, U.S.
- Died: March 1, 1963 (aged 69); Long Beach, California, U.S.
- Batted: Right Threw: Right

MLB debut
- October 1, 1914, for the Washington Senators

Last MLB appearance
- July 22, 1927, for the Brooklyn Robins

MLB statistics
- Batting average: .310
- Home runs: 106
- Runs batted in: 819
- Stats at Baseball Reference

Teams
- Washington Senators (1914); Philadelphia Phillies (1918–1921); New York Giants (1921–1926); Brooklyn Robins (1927)

Career highlights and awards
- 2× World Series champion (1921, 1922); NL RBI leader (1923)

Emil Frederick "Irish" Meusel (June 9, 1893 – March 1, 1963) was an American professional baseball left fielder. He played in the major leagues between 1914 and 1927 for the Washington Senators, Philadelphia Phillies, New York Giants, and Brooklyn Robins. With the Giants, he played in four consecutive World Series in the early 1920s. He was the brother of major league player Bob Meusel.

== Early life ==
Meusel was born in Oakland, California, and he attended Manual Arts High School in Los Angeles. He was of German and French ancestry; he acquired the nickname "Irish" because his pale skin and red hair reminded people of an Irish person.

After playing minor league baseball in the Pacific Coast League (PCL), Meusel had his contract purchased by the Washington Senators in 1914, He played one major league game for the Senators that year, but he spent most of the season on loan to the Elmira club of the New York State League. He was one of the best players in that league, finishing first in runs, hits and home runs, and finishing second to a teammate in batting average. He played in the PCL and other minor leagues through the 1917 season.

== Career ==
Meusel's major league career started in earnest when he was traded to the Philadelphia Phillies in 1918. He played four years for the Phillies, batting over .300 in three of those years.

Midway through the 1921 season, he was traded to the New York Giants. His subsequent play helped the Giants erase a 7½-game deficit to edge out the Pittsburgh Pirates and claim the pennant. He finished the year with a career-best .343 batting average. The Giants went on to win the 1921 World Series over the New York Yankees. His brother, Bob Meusel, played for the Yankees.

He appeared in four consecutive World Series for the Giants: 1921, 1922, 1923, and 1924. He played against his brother Bob in three of those series from 1921 to 1923, making them the first set of brothers to play against each other on opposing teams in a World Series or any Big Four championship series. When Bob later won his first ring with the Yankees in 1923, they also became the first set of brothers to have both won World Series championships.

In 1922, Meusel compiled 204 hits and was second in the league with 132 RBIs, both career highs. In 1923, he led the National League with 125 RBIs while scoring a career-high 102 runs. In 1925 he batted .328 with 111 RBIs and 21 home runs, a personal best. His final year was with the Brooklyn Dodgers in 1927.

In 1289 games over 11 seasons, Meusel posted a .310 batting average (1521-for-4900) with 701 runs, 250 doubles, 93 triples, 106 home runs, 819 RBI, 113 stolen bases, 269 bases on balls, .348 on-base percentage and .464 slugging percentage. He finished his career with a .959 fielding percentage playing at all three outfield positions and first and second base. In 23 World Series games from 1921-'24, Meusel hit .276 (24-for-87) with 10 runs, 3 doubles, 2 triples, 3 home runs, 17 RBI and 4 walks.

== Later life ==
After his baseball career, Meusel worked as a bartender and as a security guard in California, and he had a number of small roles in baseball-related movies, including Fast Company. He was married twice, the first marriage ending in divorce. He died of a heart attack in 1963 in Long Beach, where he lived with his second wife.

== See also ==
- List of Major League Baseball annual runs batted in leaders
