= Art Nehf =

American baseball player (1892–1960)

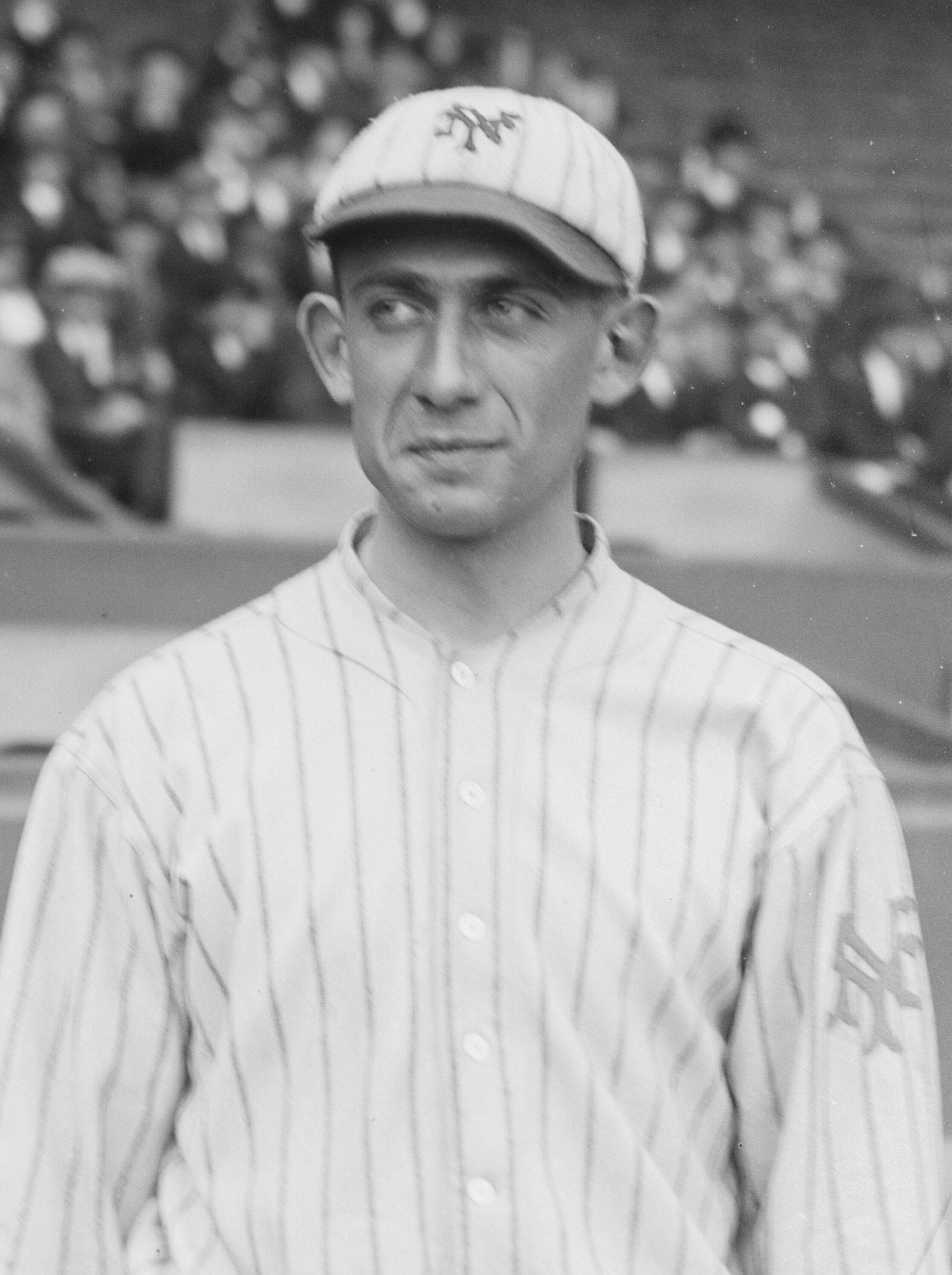
- Nehf in 1922
- Pitcher
- Born: July 31, 1892; Terre Haute, Indiana, U.S.
- Died: December 18, 1960 (aged 68); Phoenix, Arizona, U.S.
- Batted: Left Threw: Left

MLB debut
- August 13, 1915, for the Boston Braves

Last MLB appearance
- October 3, 1929, for the Chicago Cubs

MLB statistics
- Win–loss record: 184–120
- Earned run average: 3.20
- Strikeouts: 844
- Stats at Baseball Reference

Teams
- Boston Braves (1915–1919); New York Giants (1919–1926); Cincinnati Reds (1926–1927); Chicago Cubs (1927–1929)

Career highlights and awards
- 2× World Series champion (1921, 1922)

Arthur Neukom Nehf (July 31, 1892 – December 18, 1960) was an American baseball pitcher. He played 15 seasons in Major League Baseball for the Boston Braves (1915–1919), New York Giants (1919–1926), Cincinnati Reds (1926–1927), and the Chicago Cubs (1927–1929). He was left-handed, 5 ft 9 in (1.75 m) and 176 pounds when he made his debut in 1915.

== Early life ==
Nehf was born in Terre Haute, Indiana. His parents were Charles T. Nehf and Wilhelmina Neukom. His paternal grandparents were Wesley Andrew Nehf & Katherina C. Boss who were both born in Germany. He attended the Rose Polytechnic Institute in Terre Haute and earned a degree in electrical engineering in 1914. Art married Elizabeth B. May on November 1, 1916.

== Career overview ==
Besides finishing with a 184–120 record and a 3.20 ERA in 451 games, Nehf had 182 complete games and 28 shutouts (30 including postseason) in 319 starts. He had 13 career saves and also picked up a total of 844 strike outs in 2707 2/3 innings pitched.

Some years, he pitched as a starter only, and other years as a relief pitcher and a starter. He was always solid in both roles, earning a reputation around the majors as a consistent pitcher.

=== Batting ===
Nehf had a .210 career batting average with 8 home runs and 76 RBIs. Of his 8 home runs, 2 came in one game in 1924. It was his only multiple home run season. Art Nehf was the last pitcher to have 3 hits in a World Series game (Game 1~October 4, 1924) until Orel Hershiser tied that record in 1988 (Game 2~October 16).

== Major league career ==
=== Braves ===
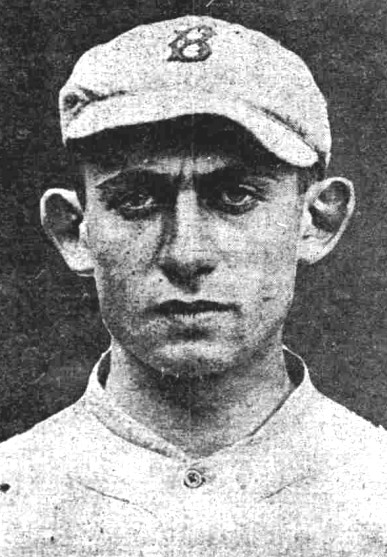
Nehf as a member of the Boston Braves in 1918.

Nehf came up with the Braves in 1915, and frequented the leaderboards throughout his time with them; he led the league in complete games with 28 in 1918, and showed up in the top 10 in wins, three times, including the year that he was traded to the Giants mid-season. In 1917, Nehf had what is generally thought of as his best season with the Braves, when he went 17–8 with a 2.16 ERA, pitching very consistently, and completing 17 of his 23 starts, with five shutouts, while also finishing seven games on the year. He also had his career-high in strike outs that year with 101, the only time he had more than 100 strike outs.

=== Giants ===
Nehf was traded to the Giants for four players and cash on August 15, 1919. He won a career-high 21 games in 1920, his first full year with the Giants. Nehf pitched in four consecutive World Series with the Giants: 1921, 1922, 1923 and 1924. He was the last man to win back to back clinching games in the World Series in 1921 and 1922. In 1924, he defeated Walter Johnson in 12 innings in the WS opener, but the Giants lost to the Washington Senators that year. The Giants won in 1921 and 1922 with the help of Nehf, who had an all-time World Series record of 4–4 with an ERA of 2.16 in twelve games, and nine starts, with six complete games. He had 28 strikeouts all-time in the World Series. Nehf also participated in the 1929 World Series with the Cubs in his last year, as the Cubs lost to the Philadelphia Athletics.

=== Reds and Cubs ===
Nehf won 107 games with the Giants, while he lost only 60. After many solid, and sometimes great, seasons with the Giants and then being traded to Cincinnati, and then to Chicago, most thought Nehf's career was virtually over. But he managed to put up one more very good year in 1928 with the Cubs. He went 13–7 with a still very low, 2.65 ERA. That year, he was also involved in a very strange and controversial play against his former team, the Giants. With the Giants in a tight pennant race against the St. Louis Cardinals, their loss in the 1st game of a doubleheader on September 27, 1928, was made all the more controversial. New York's Shanty Hogan hit a ball back to Nehf who threw to third base to get the runner, but the runner Andy Reese was off with the crack of the bat and was already at home plate, knocking over catcher Gabby Hartnett. Hartnett grabbed the runner to keep from falling, and as Hartnett held him, Reese was tagged out by the Cubs third baseman. The Giants bench erupted, but umpire Bill Klem ruled Reese out. The subsequent protest was turned down despite clear pictures showing Reese being held back. The Giants went on to lose the pennant to the Cards by two games. Coincidentally, the Cubs were two games behind that.

Nehf also was involved in one of the strangest innings in World Series history. Charlie Root was the Cubs' starting pitcher for Game 4 of the 1929 World Series at Shibe Park and was cruising along with an 8–0 lead against the Philadelphia Athletics. In the seventh inning, Nehf was brought in from the bullpen after the Athletics cut the lead to 8–4. The first batter he faced, Mule Haas, hit a fly ball that Hack Wilson lost in the sun. It ended up a three-run inside-the-park homer for Haas, and the A's went on to a 10-run inning. The Cubs lost the game 10–8 and lost the World Series two days later.

== Post-playing life ==
Nehf died of cancer in his home in Phoenix, Arizona in 1960.

== Highlights ==
- Top 5 in the National League in ERA, twice (1922, 28), and in the top 10 one more time (1917)
- Top 10 in wins, six times (1917, 18, 19, 20, 21, 22)
- Top 10 in winning percentage, six times (1917, 19, 20, 21, 24, 28)
- Led the league in complete games in 1918 (28), and made the top 10, four more times (1919, 20, 21, 22)
- Top 10 in strike outs, twice (1918, 24), and top 10 in strikeouts per nine innings, twice (1924, 25)
- As a Giant, held the record for postseason consecutive road scoreless innings pitched at 22 2/3 for 90 years – broken by Giant Madison Bumgarner in the 2014 NLCS
- Winning pitcher in final game of both the 1921 & 1922 World Series

== Honors ==
The varsity baseball field at Rose-Hulman Institute of Technology (formerly Rose Polytechnic Institute) is named in Nehf's honor. Art Nehf Field has served as the site for the 2005 and 2006 NCAA Division III Mideast Regional.

Nehf was inducted into Indiana Baseball Hall of Fame in 1989, (the 11th group)
