= W. O. McGeehan =

American sportswriter

William O'Connell McGeehan (November 22, 1879 – November 29, 1933) was an American sportswriter and editor of the New York Herald Tribune.

== Early life ==
He was born to Hugh and Theresa O'Connell McGeehan on November 22, 1879, in San Francisco, California, and died in Brunswick, Georgia, on November 29, 1933.

McGeehan entered Stanford University, but left within the first year as he enlisted in the U.S. Army to fight in the Spanish–American War. After the war. he returned to San Francisco, going to work as a reporter for the San Francisco Bulletin. McGeehan continued to work for different papers in San Francisco, including the San Francisco Chronicle.

It was during his reporter days in San Francisco that he received the nickname "Sheriff." It seems some 13 desperate convicts had escaped from Folsom Prison, outside Sacramento; one was killed in the escape but the other 12 headed for the state of Nevada. Many posses were formed and McGeehan, wanting to cover the story as a reporter, was deputized and led one of the posses into the Sierra Nevada. This group included a famous Indian Scout, Farro. They walked right by where some of the convicts were hiding and missed them. They made use of bloodhounds, but the terrain got so rough that McGeehan had to help carry the dogs back downhill. The upshot was that 3 of the 12 were captured, but the rest got away. From that time on McGeehan was known to many as Sheriff.

In 1910, McGeehan married Sophie Treadwell. Treadwell was a reporter and writer who became famous in her own right for her books and plays in later years. They met while working on one of the San Francisco papers and went East when McGeehan felt it was time to move on. He claimed the old Days weren't that good not much pay, a lot of work and certainly no recognition.

== Career ==
Although many of his columns and much of his work was related to boxing, he covered nearly all sports and write at length about his extensive travels. He fished and hunted moose in Canada, and spent much time in Europe especially in the Balkans and traveling around the Mediterranean. He was most often accompanied by his wife, although he referred to her as the woman who is driving me.

McGeehan had many excellent descriptive phrases related to various activities: Boxing was the manly art of modified murder or the Cauliflower industry. He called Primo Carnera the "tall tower of Gorgonzola" and referred to wrestlers as Pachyderms. An Italian wrestler was described as "breathing garlic and defiance." He also often wrote of a Salmon named Alphide, a leaping champion from the Meramichi River in New Brunswick, trained as a falls jumper, but died of a broken heart at the base of Niagara Falls. Also, Moe the Moose was named for Moe Levy, a fur salesman in Manhattan.

== Death ==
McGeehan fell ill while visiting with Wilbert Robinson and Tillinghast L'Hommedieu Huston at Robinson's hunting lodge on October 28, 1933. He died on November 29 from a heart ailment.
