= Hugh McQuillan =

American baseball pitcher (1895-1947)

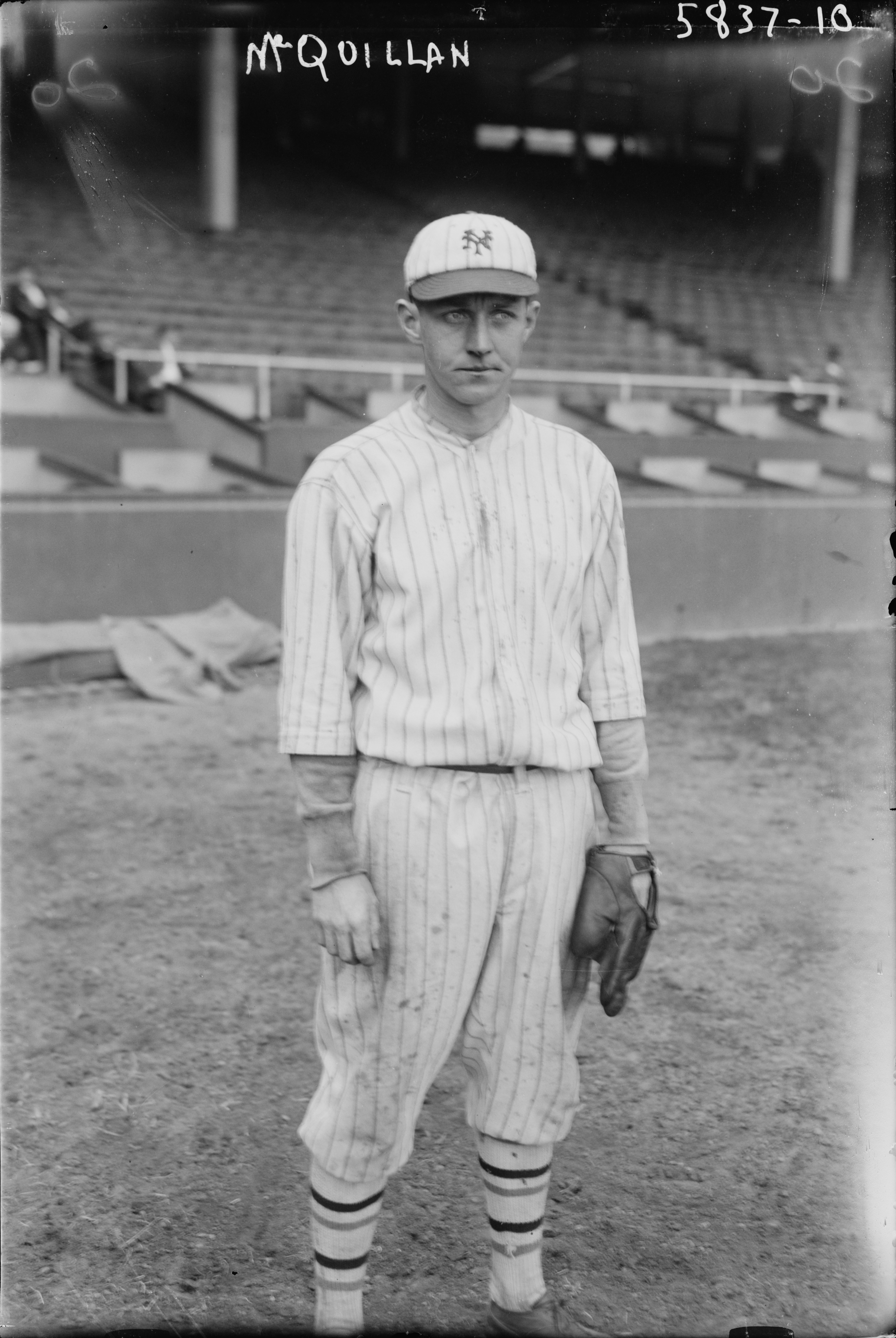
- Pitcher
- Born: September 15, 1895; New York City, New York, U.S.
- Died: August 26, 1947 (aged 51); New York City, New York, U.S.
- Batted: Right Threw: Right

MLB debut
- July 26, 1918, for the Boston Braves

Last MLB appearance
- September 11, 1927, for the Boston Braves

MLB statistics
- Win–loss record: 88–94
- Earned run average: 3.83
- Strikeouts: 446
- Stats at Baseball Reference

Teams
- Boston Braves (1918–1922); New York Giants (1922–1927); Boston Braves (1927)

Career highlights and awards
- World Series champion (1922)

Alvin Hugh McQuillan (September 15, 1895 – August 26, 1947) was an American professional baseball player. He played in Major League Baseball as a pitcher from 1918 to 1927. He played for the Boston Braves and New York Giants.

In 1561.2 innings pitched in 279 games over 10 seasons, McQuillan compiled an 88-94 won-loss record with a 3.83 Earned Run Average, allowing 1703 hits, 489 bases on balls and recording 446 strikeouts. He pitched 10 shutouts and recorded 17 saves. As a hitter, he posted a .195 batting average (103-for-527) with 45 runs, 2 home runs and 37 RBI.

On August 1, 1925, The Associated Press released an article entitled, "Wife Says Pitcher Seeks To Wed Girl. Hugh McQuillan Asked Freedom to Marry Another, Affidavit Asserts." The article reads,

"The love of Hugh McQuillan, pitcher of the Giants, for "Miss Bronx" the winner of a beauty contest representing that borough of New York, is described in affidavits which Judge Cropsey of Brooklyn has under consideration in separation proceedings brought by Mrs. Nellie Tracy McQuillan of Worcester, Mass. McQuillan flaunted his love for the prize beauty, Miss Helene Goebbel, in his wife's face, says an affidavit by Miss May Tracy, sister of the complainant, filed yesterday. The affidavit quotes McQuillan as saying to his wife: "I cannot be happy with you. Let me have my freedom so I can marry this girl, for she is the only one that can make me happy. I will pay you a certain sum at regular intervals."

Mrs. McQuillan filed an affidavit saying that manager John McGraw told her last winter that her husband had been spending his nights with some woman in the Bronx. "It appears to me," the affidavit goes on, "that my husband is still a member of the New York Giants only because the club is at the present poorly equipped with good pitchers and putting up with him in the hope he will change his habits and finish the season in good shape."

Affidavits were made by two reporters that they had seen a picture of the ball player on Miss Goebbel's dresser while interviewing her. The pitcher deposed that his wife deserted him, taking a check for $4,400, his share of the previous year's World Series money, and leaving him penniless.
