= 1923 Philadelphia Phillies season =

Major League Baseball season

1923 Philadelphia Phillies
- League: National League
- Ballpark: Baker Bowl
- City: Philadelphia, Pennsylvania
- Owners: William F. Baker
- Managers: Art Fletcher

The following lists the events of the 1923 Philadelphia Phillies season.

== Regular season ==
=== Season standings ===
National League
Team	W	L	Pct.	GB	Home	Road
New York Giants	95	58	.621	—	47‍–‍30	48‍–‍28
Cincinnati Reds	91	63	.591	4½	46‍–‍32	45‍–‍31
Pittsburgh Pirates	87	67	.565	8½	47‍–‍30	40‍–‍37
Chicago Cubs	83	71	.539	12½	46‍–‍31	37‍–‍40
St. Louis Cardinals	79	74	.516	16	42‍–‍35	37‍–‍39
Brooklyn Robins	76	78	.494	19½	37‍–‍40	39‍–‍38
Boston Braves	54	100	.351	41½	22‍–‍55	32‍–‍45
Philadelphia Phillies	50	104	.325	45½	20‍–‍55	30‍–‍49

=== Record vs. opponents ===
1923 National League record Sources:
Team	BSN	BRO	CHC	CIN	NYG	PHI	PIT	STL
Boston	—	8–14	6–16	7–15	6–16	13–9	5–17	9–13–1
Brooklyn	14–8	—	10–12	8–14	11–11	12–10–1	11–11	10–12
Chicago	16–6	12–10	—	9–13	10–12	13–9	11–11	12–10
Cincinnati	15–7	14–8	13–9	—	12–10	19–3	8–14	10–12
New York	16–6	11–11	12–10	10–12	—	19–3	13–9	14–7
Philadelphia	9–13	10–12–1	9–13	3–19	3–19	—	9–13	7–15
Pittsburgh	17–5	11–11	11–11	14–8	9–13	13–9	—	12–10
St. Louis	13–9–1	12–10	10–12	12–10	7–14	15–7	10–12	—

=== Notable transactions ===
- May 22, 1923: Lee Meadows and Johnny Rawlings were traded by the Phillies to the Pittsburgh Pirates for Cotton Tierney, Whitey Glazner and $50,000.

=== Roster ===
1923 Philadelphia Phillies
Roster
Pitchers: Petie Behan; Huck Betts; Jim Bishop; Johnny Couch; Art Gardiner; Whitey Glazner; Jim Grant; Ralph Head; Bill Hubbell; Broadway Jones; Lee Meadows; Red Miller; Clarence Mitchell; Pat Ragan; Jimmy Ring; Lefty Weinert; Jesse Winters	Catchers: Butch Henline; Dink O'Brien; Dixie Parker; Jimmie Wilson; Infielders: Joe Bennett; Walter Holke; Carlton Lord; Lenny Metz; Frank Parkinson; Goldie Rapp; Heinie Sand; Cotton Tierney; Andy Woehr; Russ Wrightstone	Outfielders: Tod Dennehey; Freddy Leach; Cliff Lee; Johnny Mokan; Curt Walker; Cy Williams	Manager: Art Fletcher; Coaches: Gavvy Cravath

== Player stats ==
=== Batting ===
==== Starters by position ====
Note: Pos = Position; G = Games played; AB = At bats; H = Hits; Avg. = Batting average; HR = Home runs; RBI = Runs batted in

Pos	Player	G	AB	H	Avg.	HR	RBI
C	Butch Henline	111	330	107	.324	7	46
1B	Walter Holke	147	562	175	.311	7	70
2B	Cotton Tierney	121	480	152	.317	11	65
SS	Heinie Sand	132	470	107	.228	4	32
3B	Russ Wrightstone	119	392	107	.273	7	57
OF	Curt Walker	140	527	148	.281	5	66
OF	Cy Williams	136	535	157	.293	41	114
OF	Johnny Mokan	113	400	125	.313	10	48

==== Other batters ====
Note: G = Games played; AB = At bats; H = Hits; Avg. = Batting average; HR = Home runs; RBI = Runs batted in

Player	G	AB	H	Avg.	HR	RBI
Cliff Lee	107	355	114	.321	11	47
Jimmie Wilson	85	252	66	.262	1	25
Frank Parkinson	67	219	53	.242	3	28
Goldie Rapp	47	179	47	.263	1	10
Freddy Leach	52	104	27	.260	1	16
Carlton Lord	17	47	11	.234	0	2
Andy Woehr	13	41	14	.341	0	3
Lenny Metz	12	37	8	.216	0	3
Tod Dennehey	9	24	7	.292	0	2
Dink O'Brien	15	21	7	.333	0	0
Dixie Parker	4	5	1	.200	0	1
Joe Bennett	1	0	0	----	0	0

=== Pitching ===
==== Starting pitchers ====
Note: G = Games pitched; IP = Innings pitched; W = Wins; L = Losses; ERA = Earned run average; SO = Strikeouts

Player	G	IP	W	L	ERA	SO
Jimmy Ring	39	304.1	18	16	3.87	112
Whitey Glazner	28	161.1	7	14	4.69	51
Clarence Mitchell	29	139.1	9	10	4.72	41
Johnny Couch	11	65.0	2	4	5.26	18

==== Other pitchers ====
Note: G = Games pitched; IP = Innings pitched; W = Wins; L = Losses; ERA = Earned run average; SO = Strikeouts

Player	G	IP	W	L	ERA	SO
Lefty Weinert	38	156.0	4	17	5.42	46
Ralph Head	35	132.1	2	9	6.66	24
Petie Behan	31	131.0	3	12	5.50	27
Huck Betts	19	84.1	2	4	3.09	18
Jesse Winters	21	78.1	1	6	7.35	23
Bill Hubbell	22	55.0	1	6	8.35	8
Lee Meadows	8	19.2	1	3	13.27	10

==== Relief pitchers ====
Note: G = Games pitched; W = Wins; L = Losses; SV = Saves; ERA = Earned run average; SO = Strikeouts

Player	G	W	L	SV	ERA	SO
Jim Bishop	15	0	3	1	6.34	5
Broadway Jones	3	0	0	0	9.00	1
Jim Grant	2	0	0	0	13.50	0
Pat Ragan	1	0	0	0	6.00	0
Red Miller	1	0	0	0	32.40	0
Walter Holke	1	0	0	0	0.00	0
Art Gardiner	1	0	0	0	----	0
