= 1922 Boston Braves season =

1922 Boston Braves
- League: National League
- Ballpark: Braves Field
- City: Boston, Massachusetts
- Record: 53–100 (.346)
- League place: 8th
- Owners: George W. Grant
- Managers: Fred Mitchell

The 1922 Boston Braves season was the 52nd season of the franchise. The Braves finished eighth in the National League with a record of 53 wins and 100 losses.

== Regular season ==
=== Season standings ===
National League
Team	W	L	Pct.	GB	Home	Road
New York Giants	93	61	.604	—	51‍–‍27	42‍–‍34
Cincinnati Reds	86	68	.558	7	48‍–‍29	38‍–‍39
St. Louis Cardinals	85	69	.552	8	42‍–‍35	43‍–‍34
Pittsburgh Pirates	85	69	.552	8	45‍–‍33	40‍–‍36
Chicago Cubs	80	74	.519	13	39‍–‍37	41‍–‍37
Brooklyn Robins	76	78	.494	17	44‍–‍34	32‍–‍44
Philadelphia Phillies	57	96	.373	35½	35‍–‍41	22‍–‍55
Boston Braves	53	100	.346	39½	32‍–‍43	21‍–‍57

=== Record vs. opponents ===
1922 National League record Sources:
Team	BSN	BRO	CHC	CIN	NYG	PHI	PIT	STL
Boston	—	7–15	4–18	5–17	8–14–1	8–13	10–12	11–11
Brooklyn	15–7	—	11–11	8–14	8–14–1	15–7	11–11	8–14
Chicago	18–4	11–11	—	11–11–1	8–14	9–13–1	10–12	13–9
Cincinnati	17–5	14–8	11–11–1	—	10–12	15–7	11–11–1	8–14
New York	14–8–1	14–8–1	14–8	12–10	—	15–7	11–11	13–9
Philadelphia	13–8	7–15	13–9–1	7–15	7–15	—	3–19	7–15
Pittsburgh	12–10	11–11	12–10	11–11–1	11–11	19–3	—	9–13
St. Louis	11–11	14–8	9–13	14–8	9–13	15–7	13–9	—

=== Roster ===
1922 Boston Braves
Roster
Pitchers: Garland Braxton; Johnny Cooney; Dana Fillingim; Joe Genewich; Harry Hulihan; Gene Lansing; Rube Marquard; Joe Matthews; Tim McNamara; Hugh McQuillan; Frank Miller; Cy Morgan; Joe Oeschger; Dick Rudolph; Mule Watson; Al Yeargin	Catchers: Frank Gibson; Hank Gowdy; Mickey O'Neil; Infielders: Walter Barbare; Tony Boeckel; Hod Ford; Gil Gallagher; Snake Henry; Walter Holke; Larry Kopf	Outfielders: Lloyd Christenbury; Walton Cruise; Fred Nicholson; Al Nixon; Ray Powell; Bunny Roser; Billy Southworth	Manager: Fred Mitchell

== Player stats ==
=== Batting ===
==== Starters by position ====
Note: Pos = Position; G = Games played; AB = At bats; H = Hits; Avg. = Batting average; HR = Home runs; RBI = Runs batted in

Pos	Player	G	AB	H	Avg.	HR	RBI
C	Mickey O'Neil	83	251	56	.223	0	26
1B	Walter Holke	105	395	115	.291	0	46
2B	Larry Kopf	126	466	124	.266	1	37
SS	Hod Ford	143	515	140	.272	2	60
3B	Tony Boeckel	119	402	116	.289	6	47
OF	Walton Cruise	104	352	98	.278	4	46
OF	Ray Powell	142	550	163	.296	6	37
OF	Al Nixon	86	318	84	.264	2	22

==== Other batters ====
Note: G = Games played; AB = At bats; H = Hits; Avg. = Batting average; HR = Home runs; RBI = Runs batted in

Player	G	AB	H	Avg.	HR	RBI
Walter Barbare	106	373	86	.231	0	40
Fred Nicholson	78	222	56	.252	2	29
Hank Gowdy	92	221	70	.317	1	27
Frank Gibson	66	164	49	.299	3	20
Billy Southworth	43	158	51	.323	4	18
Lloyd Christenbury	71	152	38	.250	1	13
Bunny Roser	32	113	27	.239	0	16
Snake Henry	18	66	13	.197	0	5
Gil Gallagher	7	22	1	.045	0	2

=== Pitching ===
==== Starting pitchers ====
Note: G = Games pitched; IP = Innings pitched; W = Wins; L = Losses; ERA = Earned run average; SO = Strikeouts

Player	G	IP	W	L	ERA	SO
Mule Watson	41	201.0	8	14	4.70	53
Frank Miller	31	200.0	11	13	3.51	65
Rube Marquard	39	198.0	11	15	5.09	57
Harry Hulihan	7	40.0	2	3	3.15	16
Johnny Cooney	4	25.0	1	2	2.16	7
Dick Rudolph	3	16.0	0	2	5.06	3
Al Yeargin	1	7.0	0	1	1.29	1

==== Other pitchers ====
Note: G = Games pitched; IP = Innings pitched; W = Wins; L = Losses; ERA = Earned run average; SO = Strikeouts

Player	G	IP	W	L	ERA	SO
Joe Oeschger	46	195.2	6	21	5.06	51
Hugh McQuillan	28	136.0	5	10	4.24	33
Dana Fillingim	25	117.0	5	9	4.54	25
Tim McNamara	24	70.2	3	4	2.42	16
Garland Braxton	25	66.2	1	2	3.38	15
Joe Genewich	6	23.0	0	2	7.04	4
Joe Matthews	3	10.0	0	1	3.60	0

==== Relief pitchers ====
Note: G = Games pitched; W = Wins; L = Losses; SV = Saves; ERA = Earned run average; SO = Strikeouts

Player	G	W	L	SV	ERA	SO
Gene Lansing	15	0	1	0	5.98	14
Cy Morgan	2	0	0	0	27.00	0
