= 1922 Pittsburgh Pirates season =

1922 Pittsburgh Pirates
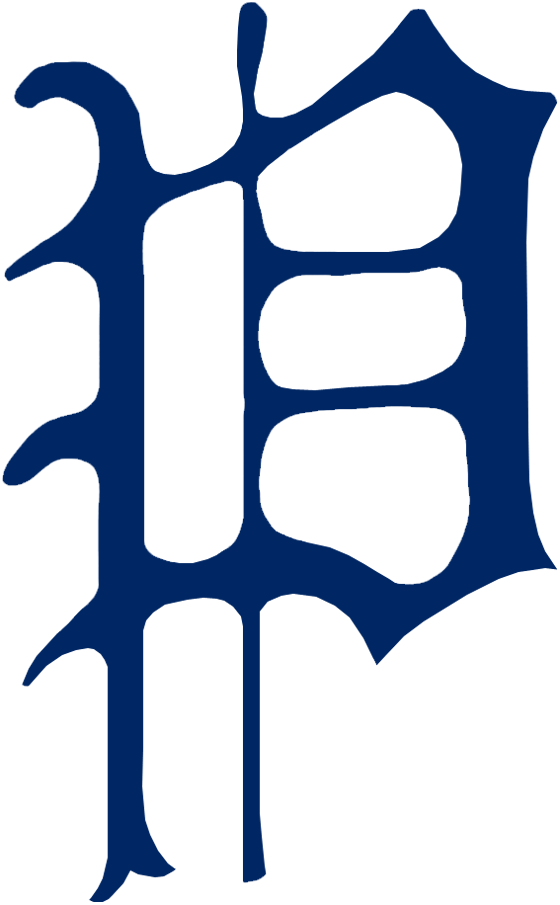
- League: National League
- Ballpark: Forbes Field
- City: Pittsburgh, Pennsylvania
- Owners: Barney Dreyfuss
- Managers: George Gibson, Bill McKechnie

The 1922 Pittsburgh Pirates season was the 41st season of the Pittsburgh Pirates franchise; the 36th in the National League. The Pirates finished tied for third place with the Cardinals in the league standings with a record of 85–69.

== Regular season ==
=== Season standings ===
National League
Team	W	L	Pct.	GB	Home	Road
New York Giants	93	61	.604	—	51‍–‍27	42‍–‍34
Cincinnati Reds	86	68	.558	7	48‍–‍29	38‍–‍39
St. Louis Cardinals	85	69	.552	8	42‍–‍35	43‍–‍34
Pittsburgh Pirates	85	69	.552	8	45‍–‍33	40‍–‍36
Chicago Cubs	80	74	.519	13	39‍–‍37	41‍–‍37
Brooklyn Robins	76	78	.494	17	44‍–‍34	32‍–‍44
Philadelphia Phillies	57	96	.373	35½	35‍–‍41	22‍–‍55
Boston Braves	53	100	.346	39½	32‍–‍43	21‍–‍57

=== Record vs. opponents ===
1922 National League record Sources:
Team	BSN	BRO	CHC	CIN	NYG	PHI	PIT	STL
Boston	—	7–15	4–18	5–17	8–14–1	8–13	10–12	11–11
Brooklyn	15–7	—	11–11	8–14	8–14–1	15–7	11–11	8–14
Chicago	18–4	11–11	—	11–11–1	8–14	9–13–1	10–12	13–9
Cincinnati	17–5	14–8	11–11–1	—	10–12	15–7	11–11–1	8–14
New York	14–8–1	14–8–1	14–8	12–10	—	15–7	11–11	13–9
Philadelphia	13–8	7–15	13–9–1	7–15	7–15	—	3–19	7–15
Pittsburgh	12–10	11–11	12–10	11–11–1	11–11	19–3	—	9–13
St. Louis	11–11	14–8	9–13	14–8	9–13	15–7	13–9	—

=== Game log ===
1922 Game Log: 85–69 (Home: 45–33; Away: 40–36)
April: 7–8 (Home: 3–2; Away: 4–6)

#	Date	Opponent	Score	Win	Loss	Save	Attendance	Record
1	April 12	@ Cardinals	1–10	Sherdel	**Cooper** (0–1)	—	18,000	0–1
2	April 13	@ Cardinals	4–8	Doak	**Glazner** (0–1)	Barfoot	—	0–2
3	April 15	@ Cardinals	2–3	Haines	**Adams** (0–1)	—	—	0–3
4	April 16	@ Reds	4–3	**Cooper** (1–1)	Rixey	—	—	1–3
5	April 17	@ Reds	1–0	**Morrison** (1–0)	Luque	—	—	2–3
6	April 18	@ Reds	8–4	**Carlson** (1–0)	Markle	**Hamilton** (1)	—	3–3
7	April 20	Cardinals	10–5	**Cooper** (2–1)	Barfoot	**Adams** (1)	—	4–3
8	April 22	Cardinals	14–2	**Morrison** (2–0)	Haines	—	—	5–3
9	April 23	@ Cubs	14–3	**Carlson** (2–0)	Jones	—	—	6–3
10	April 24	@ Cubs	2–4	Aldridge	**Cooper** (2–2)	—	—	6–4
11	April 26	@ Cubs	3–4 (10)	Alexander	**Adams** (0–2)	—	—	6–5
12	April 27	Reds	5–8	Luque	**Morrison** (2–1)	Donohue	—	6–6
13	April 28	Reds	3–5	Couch	**Carlson** (2–1)	—	—	6–7
14	April 29	Reds	7–3	**Cooper** (3–2)	Rixey	—	—	7–7
15	April 30	@ Reds	1–3	Donohue	**Glazner** (0–2)	—	—	7–8

May: 17–8 (Home: 13–4; Away: 4–4)

#	Date	Opponent	Score	Win	Loss	Save	Attendance	Record
16	May 1	@ Reds	7–6	**Adams** (1–2)	Luque	**Hamilton** (2)	—	8–8
17	May 2	@ Reds	2–9	Couch	**Carlson** (2–2)	—	—	8–9
18	May 5	Cubs	3–1	**Cooper** (4–2)	Jones	—	—	9–9
19	May 6	Cubs	7–11	Aldridge	**Glazner** (0–3)	—	—	9–10
20	May 7	@ Cubs	11–5	**Carlson** (3–2)	Alexander	—	—	10–10
21	May 8	Robins	8–7	**Yellow Horse** (1–0)	Grimes	—	—	11–10
22	May 9	Robins	8–2	**Cooper** (5–2)	Cadore	—	6,000	12–10
23	May 11	Robins	12–6	**Adams** (2–2)	Vance	—	7,000	13–10
24	May 12	Braves	5–3	**Yellow Horse** (2–0)	Watson	—	—	14–10
25	May 13	Braves	5–8	McQuillan	**Cooper** (5–3)	—	—	14–11
26	May 15	Braves	6–5 (10)	**Carlson** (4–2)	Oeschger	—	—	15–11
27	May 16	Braves	5–7 (12)	Miller	**Cooper** (5–4)	—	—	15–12
28	May 20	Giants	10–7	**Carlson** (5–2)	Ryan	**Glazner** (1)	25,000	16–12
29	May 22	Phillies	5–0	**Cooper** (6–4)	Hubbell	—	—	17–12
30	May 23	Phillies	10–3	**Morrison** (3–1)	Smith	—	—	18–12
31	May 24	Phillies	11–4 (8)	**Carlson** (6–2)	Ring	—	—	19–12
32	May 25	@ Cardinals	7–3	**Glazner** (1–3)	Sherdel	—	—	20–12
33	May 26	@ Cardinals	2–6	Doak	**Cooper** (6–5)	—	—	20–13
34	May 27	@ Cardinals	2–3	Sherdel	**Adams** (2–3)	—	—	20–14
35	May 27	@ Cardinals	3–2 (10)	**Hamilton** (1–0)	Pfeffer	**Morrison** (1)	—	21–14
36	May 28	@ Cardinals	3–4	Pertica	**Carlson** (6–3)	—	—	21–15
37	May 29	Reds	5–2	**Glazner** (2–3)	Donohue	—	—	22–15
38	May 30	Reds	3–9	Rixey	**Cooper** (6–6)	—	—	22–16
39	May 30	Reds	7–3	**Morrison** (4–1)	Keck	—	—	23–16
40	May 31	Reds	11–2	**Hamilton** (2–0)	Couch	—	—	24–16

June: 8–17 (Home: 1–6; Away: 7–11)

#	Date	Opponent	Score	Win	Loss	Save	Attendance	Record
41	June 1	Cardinals	2–3	Pfeffer	**Carlson** (6–4)	Barfoot	—	24–17
42	June 3	Cardinals	6–9	Pertica	**Adams** (2–4)	—	19,000	24–18
43	June 7	@ Phillies	5–0	**Morrison** (5–1)	Meadows	—	—	25–18
44	June 8	@ Phillies	7–5	**Carlson** (7–4)	Ring	—	—	26–18
45	June 9	@ Braves	3–7	Oeschger	**Cooper** (6–7)	—	—	26–19
46	June 10	@ Braves	9–1	**Glazner** (3–3)	Watson	—	—	27–19
47	June 12	@ Braves	2–11	Miller	**Morrison** (5–2)	—	—	27–20
48	June 13	@ Braves	5–8	Marquard	**Cooper** (6–8)	McQuillan	—	27–21
49	June 14	@ Giants	0–13	Douglas	**Carlson** (7–5)	—	10,000	27–22
50	June 15	@ Giants	2–4	Ryan	**Adams** (2–5)	—	8,000	27–23
51	June 16	@ Giants	1–7	Barnes	**Glazner** (3–4)	—	8,000	27–24
52	June 17	@ Giants	1–2 (10)	Nehf	**Morrison** (5–3)	—	15,000	27–25
53	June 18	@ Robins	2–0 (6)	**Cooper** (7–8)	Ruether	—	18,000	28–25
54	June 19	@ Robins	5–6 (14)	Decatur	**Hamilton** (2–1)	—	3,500	28–26
55	June 21	@ Robins	14–15 (10)	Grimes	**Adams** (2–6)	—	3,500	28–27
56	June 22	Cubs	8–6	**Cooper** (8–8)	Alexander	**Carlson** (1)	—	29–27
57	June 23	Reds	2–6	Rixey	**Morrison** (5–4)	—	—	29–28
58	June 24	Reds	3–7	Luque	**Glazner** (3–5)	Keck	—	29–29
59	June 25	@ Reds	4–7	Couch	**Carlson** (7–6)	—	—	29–30
60	June 26	@ Cubs	4–6	Stueland	**Morrison** (5–5)	—	—	29–31
61	June 27	@ Cubs	6–1	**Cooper** (9–8)	Cheeves	—	—	30–31
62	June 27	@ Cubs	7–6	**Glazner** (4–5)	Alexander	**Carlson** (2)	9,000	31–31
63	June 28	@ Cubs	7–2	**Hamilton** (3–1)	Aldridge	—	—	32–31
64	June 29	Cardinals	5–8	Haines	**Carlson** (7–7)	—	5,000	32–32
65	June 30	Cardinals	0–6	Sherdel	**Morrison** (5–6)	—	—	32–33

July: 16–14 (Home: 12–10; Away: 4–4)

#	Date	Opponent	Score	Win	Loss	Save	Attendance	Record
66	July 1	Cardinals	5–9	Doak	**Cooper** (9–9)	North	—	32–34
67	July 1	Cardinals	9–8	**Adams** (3–6)	Pertica	**Carlson** (3)	—	33–34
68	July 2	@ Cubs	1–5	Alexander	**Hamilton** (3–2)	—	8,000	33–35
69	July 3	Cubs	5–2	**Yellow Horse** (3–0)	Stueland	—	—	34–35
70	July 4	Cubs	4–8	Cheeves	**Glazner** (4–6)	Osborne	—	34–36
71	July 4	Cubs	0–8	Aldridge	**Morrison** (5–7)	—	—	34–37
72	July 5	Cubs	5–11	Jones	**Carlson** (7–8)	—	—	34–38
73	July 6	Giants	3–6	Nehf	**Adams** (3–7)	—	4,000	34–39
74	July 7	Giants	8–9 (18)	Ryan	**Morrison** (5–8)	—	4,000	34–40
75	July 8	Giants	7–5	**Cooper** (10–9)	Toney	—	10,000	35–40
76	July 10	Giants	2–19	Nehf	**Hamilton** (3–3)	—	15,000	35–41
77	July 10	Giants	5–4	**Carlson** (8–8)	Ryan	—	—	36–41
78	July 11	Braves	4–10	McQuillan	**Morrison** (5–9)	—	—	36–42
79	July 12	Braves	3–4	Watson	**Yellow Horse** (3–1)	Miller	—	36–43
80	July 14	Braves	6–1	**Cooper** (11–9)	Marquard	—	—	37–43
81	July 15	Robins	3–2 (10)	**Morrison** (6–9)	Smith	—	12,000	38–43
82	July 16	@ Robins	2–6	Grimes	**Carlson** (8–9)	—	8,000	38–44
83	July 17	Robins	8–5	**Hamilton** (4–3)	Vance	—	3,500	39–44
84	July 19	Phillies	2–0	**Cooper** (12–9)	Hubbell	—	—	40–44
85	July 20	Phillies	2–1 (12)	**Glazner** (5–6)	Weinert	—	—	41–44
86	July 21	Phillies	6–0	**Morrison** (7–9)	Ring	—	—	42–44
87	July 22	Phillies	8–7	**Hamilton** (5–3)	Meadows	—	—	43–44
88	July 24	Giants	3–2	**Cooper** (13–9)	Barnes	—	—	44–44
89	July 24	Giants	4–11	Nehf	**Carlson** (8–10)	—	20,000	44–45
90	July 25	@ Robins	5–3	**Morrison** (8–9)	Grimes	—	2,000	45–45
91	July 26	@ Robins	0–7	Ruether	**Glazner** (5–7)	—	2,500	45–46
92	July 28	@ Robins	2–3	Vance	**Adams** (3–8)	—	3,000	45–47
93	July 29	@ Giants	8–3	**Cooper** (14–9)	Toney	—	—	46–47
94	July 30	@ Giants	7–0	**Morrison** (9–9)	Douglas	—	25,000	47–47
95	July 31	@ Giants	12–5	**Hamilton** (6–3)	Barnes	—	3,000	48–47

August: 20–9 (Home: 11–8; Away: 9–1)

#	Date	Opponent	Score	Win	Loss	Save	Attendance	Record
96	August 1	@ Giants	10–2	**Cooper** (15–9)	Ryan	—	8,000	49–47
97	August 3	@ Braves	5–1	**Glazner** (6–7)	Watson	—	—	50–47
98	August 4	@ Braves	3–0 (8)	**Adams** (4–8)	Miller	—	—	51–47
99	August 5	@ Braves	9–3	**Morrison** (10–9)	Marquard	—	—	52–47
100	August 7	@ Phillies	17–10	**Glazner** (7–7)	Singleton	—	—	53–47
101	August 8	@ Phillies	19–8	**Hamilton** (7–3)	Meadows	—	—	54–47
102	August 8	@ Phillies	7–3	**Morrison** (11–9)	Winters	—	—	55–47
103	August 10	@ Phillies	14–4	**Carlson** (9–10)	Ring	—	—	56–47
104	August 11	Reds	7–1	**Cooper** (16–9)	Luque	—	—	57–47
105	August 12	Reds	6–0	**Adams** (5–8)	Rixey	—	—	58–47
106	August 13	@ Reds	4–5 (10)	Luque	**Hamilton** (7–4)	—	—	58–48
107	August 14	Phillies	1–10	Winters	**Glazner** (7–8)	—	—	58–49
108	August 15	Giants	6–2	**Cooper** (17–9)	Nehf	—	25,000	59–49
109	August 16	Giants	6–7	Scott	**Hamilton** (7–5)	Nehf	16,000	59–50
110	August 17	Giants	3–6	McQuillan	**Morrison** (11–10)	—	20,000	59–51
111	August 18	Braves	2–5	Miller	**Cooper** (17–10)	—	—	59–52
112	August 19	Braves	1–4	Braxton	**Adams** (5–9)	—	—	59–53
113	August 19	Braves	8–2	**Brown** (1–0)	Watson	—	—	60–53
114	August 21	Braves	5–1	**Hamilton** (8–5)	Oeschger	—	—	61–53
115	August 22	Phillies	4–3	**Morrison** (12–10)	Meadows	—	—	62–53
116	August 23	Phillies	11–3	**Cooper** (18–10)	Hubbell	—	—	63–53
117	August 24	Phillies	10–4	**Brown** (2–0)	Winters	—	—	64–53
118	August 25	Robins	7–8	Decatur	**Carlson** (9–11)	—	4,000	64–54
119	August 25	Robins	6–8	Cadore	**Glazner** (7–9)	—	8,000	64–55
120	August 26	Robins	7–5	**Morrison** (13–10)	Mamaux	—	8,000	65–55
121	August 28	Robins	4–3 (11)	**Cooper** (19–10)	Vance	—	—	66–55
122	August 29	Robins	2–3	Ruether	**Hamilton** (8–6)	—	5,000	66–56
123	August 29	Robins	6–0	**Adams** (6–9)	Cadore	—	9,000	67–56
124	August 30	@ Reds	2–0 (8)	**Glazner** (8–9)	Rixey	—	—	68–56

September: 17–11 (Home: 5–3; Away: 12–8)

#	Date	Opponent	Score	Win	Loss	Save	Attendance	Record
125	September 1	@ Cardinals	14–4	**Morrison** (14–10)	Doak	—	—	69–56
126	September 1	@ Cardinals	6–11	Sell	**Cooper** (19–11)	Pfeffer	—	69–57
127	September 2	@ Cardinals	9–5	**Brown** (3–0)	Sherdel	**Carlson** (4)	—	70–57
128	September 3	@ Cubs	2–0 (11)	**Hamilton** (9–6)	Alexander	—	—	71–57
129	September 4	Cardinals	3–5	Pfeffer	**Adams** (6–10)	—	—	71–58
130	September 4	Cardinals	6–5	**Glazner** (9–9)	Barfoot	—	—	72–58
131	September 5	Cardinals	11–0	**Morrison** (15–10)	Sell	—	—	73–58
132	September 7	Cubs	6–0	**Cooper** (20–11)	Stueland	—	—	74–58
133	September 8	Cubs	7–10	Cheeves	**Brown** (3–1)	Kaufmann	—	74–59
134	September 9	Cubs	7–4	**Glazner** (10–9)	Alexander	—	—	75–59
135	September 9	Cubs	8–7 (10)	**Hamilton** (10–6)	Kaufmann	—	—	76–59
136	September 13	@ Braves	8–1	**Cooper** (21–11)	Oeschger	—	—	77–59
137	September 13	@ Braves	6–1	**Morrison** (16–10)	Cooney	—	—	78–59
138	September 14	@ Braves	8–0	**Adams** (7–10)	Miller	—	—	79–59
139	September 15	@ Braves	1–4	Marquard	**Glazner** (10–10)	—	—	79–60
140	September 16	@ Phillies	11–6	**Cooper** (22–11)	Meadows	—	—	80–60
141	September 16	@ Phillies	6–8	Behan	**Carlson** (9–12)	—	—	80–61
142	September 18	@ Phillies	11–3	**Morrison** (17–10)	Hubbell	—	—	81–61
143	September 18	@ Phillies	2–5	Weinert	**Hamilton** (10–7)	—	—	81–62
144	September 19	@ Phillies	6–1	**Glazner** (11–10)	Ring	—	1,000	82–62
145	September 20	@ Giants	4–1	**Cooper** (23–11)	McQuillan	—	15,000	83–62
146	September 21	@ Giants	6–1	**Hamilton** (11–7)	Nehf	—	15,000	84–62
147	September 22	@ Giants	7–8	McQuillan	**Adams** (7–11)	—	15,000	84–63
148	September 23	@ Robins	5–9	Ruether	**Glazner** (11–11)	—	15,000	84–64
149	September 23	@ Robins	1–5	Decatur	**Cooper** (23–12)	—	20,000	84–65
150	September 24	@ Robins	2–4	Grimes	**Morrison** (17–11)	—	—	84–66
151	September 24	@ Robins	11–3 (7)	**Adams** (8–11)	Cadore	—	23,000	85–66
152	September 27	Cubs	1–4	Fussell	**Cooper** (23–13)	—	—	85–67
153	September 30	@ Reds	7–7 (10)			—	—	85–67

October: 0–2 (Home: 0–0; Away: 0–2)

#	Date	Opponent	Score	Win	Loss	Save	Attendance	Record
154	October 1	@ Reds	4–5	Markle	**Cooper** (23–14)	—	—	85–68
155	October 1	@ Reds	1–5	Rixey	**Glazner** (11–12)	—	—	85–69

Legend: = Win = Loss = Tie
Bold = Pirates team member

=== Roster ===
1922 Pittsburgh Pirates
**Roster**
**Pitchers**: Babe Adams; Myrl Brown; Hal Carlson; Wilbur Cooper; Whitey Glazner; Earl Hamilton; Bonnie Hollingsworth; Johnny Morrison; Rip Wheeler; Chief Yellow Horse; Jimmy Zinn	**Catchers**: Johnny Gooch; Bubber Jonnard; Jim Mattox; Walter Schmidt; **Infielders**: Clyde Barnhart; Jewel Ens; Charlie Grimm; Jack Hammond; Rabbit Maranville; Stuffy Stewart; Cotton Tierney; Pie Traynor	**Outfielders**: Carson Bigbee; Max Carey; Jake Miller; Johnny Mokan; Walter Mueller; Ray Rohwer; Reb Russell; **Other batters**: Kiki Cuyler; Tom Lovelace; Tom McNamara; Art Merewether	**Manager**: George Gibson; Bill McKechnie

== Player stats ==
=== Batting ===
==== Starters by position ====
Note: Pos = Position; G = Games played; AB = At bats; H = Hits; Avg. = Batting average; HR = Home runs; RBI = Runs batted in

Pos	Player	G	AB	H	Avg.	HR	RBI
C	Johnny Gooch	105	353	116	.329	1	42
1B	Charlie Grimm	154	593	173	.292	0	76
2B	Cotton Tierney	122	441	152	.345	7	86
SS	Rabbit Maranville	155	672	198	.295	0	63
3B	Pie Traynor	142	571	161	.282	4	81
OF	Carson Bigbee	150	614	215	.350	5	99
OF	Reb Russell	60	220	81	.368	12	75
OF	Max Carey	155	629	207	.329	10	70

==== Other batters ====
Note: G = Games played; AB = At bats; H = Hits; Avg. = Batting average; HR = Home runs; RBI = Runs batted in

Player	G	AB	H	Avg.	HR	RBI
Clyde Barnhart	75	209	69	.330	1	38
Walter Schmidt	40	152	50	.329	0	22
Jewel Ens	47	142	42	.296	0	17
Ray Rohwer	53	129	38	.295	3	22
Walter Mueller	32	122	33	.270	2	18
Johnny Mokan	31	89	23	.258	0	8
Jim Mattox	29	51	15	.294	0	3
Bubber Jonnard	10	21	5	.238	0	2
Stuffy Stewart	3	13	2	.154	0	0
Jack Hammond	9	11	3	.273	0	0
Jake Miller	3	11	1	.091	0	0
Tom McNamara	1	1	0	.000	0	0
Art Merewether	1	1	0	.000	0	0
Tom Lovelace	1	1	0	.000	0	0
Kiki Cuyler	1	0	0	----	0	0

=== Pitching ===
==== Starting pitchers ====
Note: G = Games pitched; IP = Innings pitched; W = Wins; L = Losses; ERA = Earned run average; SO = Strikeouts

Player	G	IP	W	L	ERA	SO
Wilbur Cooper	41	294.2	23	14	3.18	129
Johnny Morrison	45	286.1	17	11	3.43	104
Whitey Glazner	34	193.0	11	12	4.38	77
Babe Adams	27	171.1	8	11	3.57	39

==== Other pitchers ====
Note: G = Games pitched; IP = Innings pitched; W = Wins; L = Losses; ERA = Earned run average; SO = Strikeouts

Player	G	IP	W	L	ERA	SO
Earl Hamilton	33	160.0	11	7	3.99	34
Hal Carlson	39	145.1	9	12	5.70	64
Chief Yellow Horse	28	77.2	3	1	4.52	24
Myrl Brown	7	34.2	3	1	5.97	9

==== Relief pitchers ====
Note: G = Games pitched; W = Wins; L = Losses; SV = Saves; ERA = Earned run average; SO = Strikeouts

Player	G	W	L	SV	ERA	SO
Bonnie Hollingsworth	9	0	0	0	7.90	7
Jimmy Zinn	5	0	0	0	1.86	3
Rip Wheeler	1	0	0	0	0.00	0
