= 1922 Philadelphia Phillies season =

Major League Baseball season

1922 Philadelphia Phillies
- League: National League
- Ballpark: Baker Bowl
- City: Philadelphia, Pennsylvania
- Owners: William F. Baker
- Managers: Kaiser Wilhelm

The following lists the events of the 1922 Philadelphia Phillies season.

On August 25, the Phillies scored 23 runs on 26 hits at Cubs Park but allowed 26 runs and 25 hits, losing to the Cubs, 26–23. This game was the highest scoring contest in MLB history in the modern era along with the most combined hits in a game between both teams.

== Regular season ==
=== Season standings ===
National League
Team	W	L	Pct.	GB	Home	Road
New York Giants	93	61	.604	—	51‍–‍27	42‍–‍34
Cincinnati Reds	86	68	.558	7	48‍–‍29	38‍–‍39
St. Louis Cardinals	85	69	.552	8	42‍–‍35	43‍–‍34
Pittsburgh Pirates	85	69	.552	8	45‍–‍33	40‍–‍36
Chicago Cubs	80	74	.519	13	39‍–‍37	41‍–‍37
Brooklyn Robins	76	78	.494	17	44‍–‍34	32‍–‍44
Philadelphia Phillies	57	96	.373	35½	35‍–‍41	22‍–‍55
Boston Braves	53	100	.346	39½	32‍–‍43	21‍–‍57

=== Record vs. opponents ===
1922 National League record Sources:
Team	BSN	BRO	CHC	CIN	NYG	PHI	PIT	STL
Boston	—	7–15	4–18	5–17	8–14–1	8–13	10–12	11–11
Brooklyn	15–7	—	11–11	8–14	8–14–1	15–7	11–11	8–14
Chicago	18–4	11–11	—	11–11–1	8–14	9–13–1	10–12	13–9
Cincinnati	17–5	14–8	11–11–1	—	10–12	15–7	11–11–1	8–14
New York	14–8–1	14–8–1	14–8	12–10	—	15–7	11–11	13–9
Philadelphia	13–8	7–15	13–9–1	7–15	7–15	—	3–19	7–15
Pittsburgh	12–10	11–11	12–10	11–11–1	11–11	19–3	—	9–13
St. Louis	11–11	14–8	9–13	14–8	9–13	15–7	13–9	—

=== Roster ===
1922 Philadelphia Phillies
Roster
Pitchers: Stan Baumgartner; Petie Behan; Huck Betts; Bill Hubbell; Lee Meadows; Lerton Pinto; Jimmy Ring; John Singleton; George Smith; Tom Sullivan; Lefty Weinert; Jesse Winters	Catchers: Butch Henline; John Peters; Frank Withrow; Infielders: Rabbit Benton; Art Fletcher; Roy Leslie; Frank Parkinson; Goldie Rapp; Jimmy Smith; Russ Wrightstone	Outfielders: Lee King; Bevo LeBourveau; Cliff Lee; Johnny Mokan; Curt Walker; Cy Williams	Manager: Kaiser Wilhelm; Coaches: Wid Conroy

== Player stats ==
=== Batting ===
==== Starters by position ====
Note: Pos = Position; G = Games played; AB = At bats; H = Hits; Avg. = Batting average; HR = Home runs; RBI = Runs batted in

Pos	Player	G	AB	H	Avg.	HR	RBI
C	Butch Henline	125	430	136	.316	14	64
1B	Roy Leslie	141	513	139	.271	6	50
2B	Frank Parkinson	141	545	150	.275	15	70
SS	Art Fletcher	110	396	111	.280	7	53
3B	Goldie Rapp	119	502	127	.253	0	38
OF	Cliff Lee	122	422	136	.322	17	77
OF	Curt Walker	148	581	196	.337	12	89
OF	Cy Williams	151	584	180	.308	26	92

==== Other batters ====
Note: G = Games played; AB = At bats; H = Hits; Avg. = Batting average; HR = Home runs; RBI = Runs batted in

Player	G	AB	H	Avg.	HR	RBI
Russ Wrightstone	99	331	101	.305	5	33
Bevo LeBourveau	74	167	45	.269	2	20
Johnny Mokan	47	151	38	.252	3	27
John Peters	55	143	35	.245	4	24
Jimmy Smith	38	114	25	.219	1	6
Lee King	19	53	12	.226	2	13
Frank Withrow	10	21	7	.333	0	3
Rabbit Benton	6	19	4	.211	0	3

=== Pitching ===
==== Starting pitchers ====
Note: G = Games pitched; IP = Innings pitched; W = Wins; L = Losses; ERA = Earned run average; SO = Strikeouts

Player	G	IP	W	L	ERA	SO
Jimmy Ring	40	249.1	12	18	4.58	116
Lee Meadows	33	237.0	12	18	4.03	62
Bill Hubbell	35	189.0	7	15	5.00	33
Petie Behan	7	47.1	4	2	2.47	13

==== Other pitchers ====
Note: G = Games pitched; IP = Innings pitched; W = Wins; L = Losses; ERA = Earned run average; SO = Strikeouts

Player	G	IP	W	L	ERA	SO
George Smith	42	194.0	5	14	4.78	44
Lefty Weinert	34	166.2	8	11	3.40	58
Jesse Winters	34	138.1	6	6	5.33	29
John Singleton	22	93.0	1	10	5.90	27
Stan Baumgartner	6	9.2	1	1	6.52	2

==== Relief pitchers ====
Note: G = Games pitched; W = Wins; L = Losses; SV = Saves; ERA = Earned run average; SO = Strikeouts

Player	G	W	L	SV	ERA	SO
Lerton Pinto	9	0	1	0	5.11	4
Huck Betts	7	1	0	0	9.60	4
Tom Sullivan	3	0	0	0	11.25	2
