= 1922 Brooklyn Robins season =

1922 Brooklyn Robins
- League: National League
- Ballpark: Ebbets Field
- City: Brooklyn, New York
- Record: 76–78 (.494)
- League place: 6th
- Owners: Charles Ebbets, Ed McKeever, Stephen McKeever
- President: Charles Ebbets
- Managers: Wilbert Robinson

The 1922 Brooklyn Robins struggled all season, finishing in sixth place.

== Offseason ==
- December 1921: Ferdie Schupp was purchased from the Robins by the Chicago White Sox.
- January 24, 1922: Sam Crane was purchased by the Robins from the Cincinnati Reds.
- March 14, 1922: Possum Whitted was purchased by the Robins from the Pittsburgh Pirates.

== Regular season ==
=== Season standings ===
National League
Team	W	L	Pct.	GB	Home	Road
New York Giants	93	61	.604	—	51‍–‍27	42‍–‍34
Cincinnati Reds	86	68	.558	7	48‍–‍29	38‍–‍39
St. Louis Cardinals	85	69	.552	8	42‍–‍35	43‍–‍34
Pittsburgh Pirates	85	69	.552	8	45‍–‍33	40‍–‍36
Chicago Cubs	80	74	.519	13	39‍–‍37	41‍–‍37
Brooklyn Robins	76	78	.494	17	44‍–‍34	32‍–‍44
Philadelphia Phillies	57	96	.373	35½	35‍–‍41	22‍–‍55
Boston Braves	53	100	.346	39½	32‍–‍43	21‍–‍57

=== Record vs. opponents ===
1922 National League record Sources:
Team	BSN	BRO	CHC	CIN	NYG	PHI	PIT	STL
Boston	—	7–15	4–18	5–17	8–14–1	8–13	10–12	11–11
Brooklyn	15–7	—	11–11	8–14	8–14–1	15–7	11–11	8–14
Chicago	18–4	11–11	—	11–11–1	8–14	9–13–1	10–12	13–9
Cincinnati	17–5	14–8	11–11–1	—	10–12	15–7	11–11–1	8–14
New York	14–8–1	14–8–1	14–8	12–10	—	15–7	11–11	13–9
Philadelphia	13–8	7–15	13–9–1	7–15	7–15	—	3–19	7–15
Pittsburgh	12–10	11–11	12–10	11–11–1	11–11	19–3	—	9–13
St. Louis	11–11	14–8	9–13	14–8	9–13	15–7	13–9	—

=== Roster ===
1922 Brooklyn Robins
Roster
Pitchers: Leon Cadore; Art Decatur; Ray Gordinier; Burleigh Grimes; Al Mamaux; Jim Murray; Dutch Ruether; Paul Schreiber; Harry Shriver; Sherry Smith; Dazzy Vance	Catchers: Hank DeBerry; Bernie Hungling; Otto Miller; Zack Taylor; Infielders: Sam Crane; Andy High; Hal Janvrin; Jimmy Johnston; Clarence Mitchell; Ivy Olson; Sam Post; Ray Schmandt; Chuck Ward	Outfielders: Bert Griffith; Tommy Griffith; Wally Hood; Hy Myers; Bernie Neis; Zack Wheat; Possum Whitted	Manager: Wilbert Robinson

== Player stats ==
=== Batting ===
==== Starters by position ====
Note: Pos = Position; G = Games played; AB = At bats; H = Hits; Avg. = Batting average; HR = Home runs; RBI = Runs batted in

Pos	Player	G	AB	H	Avg.	HR	RBI
C	Hank DeBerry	85	259	78	.301	3	35
1B	Ray Schmandt	110	396	106	.268	2	44
2B	Ivy Olson	136	551	150	.272	1	47
3B	Andy High	153	579	164	.283	6	65
SS	Jimmy Johnston	138	567	181	.319	4	49
OF	Hy Myers	153	618	196	.317	6	89
OF	Zack Wheat	152	600	201	.335	16	112
OF	Tommy Griffith	99	329	104	.316	4	49

==== Other batters ====
Note: G = Games played; AB = At bats; H = Hits; Avg. = Batting average; HR = Home runs; RBI = Runs batted in

Player	G	AB	H	Avg.	HR	RBI
Bert Griffith	106	325	100	.308	2	35
Otto Miller	59	180	47	.261	1	23
Clarence Mitchell	56	155	45	.290	3	28
Bernie Hungling	39	102	23	.225	1	13
Chuck Ward	33	91	25	.275	0	14
Bernie Neis	61	70	16	.229	1	9
Hal Janvrin	30	57	17	.298	0	1
Sam Post	9	25	7	.280	0	4
Zack Taylor	7	14	3	.214	0	2
Sam Crane	3	8	2	.250	0	0
Possum Whitted	1	1	0	.000	0	0
Wally Hood	2	0	0	----	0	0

=== Pitching ===
==== Starting pitchers ====
Note: G = Games pitched; IP = Innings pitched; W = Wins; L = Losses; ERA = Earned run average; SO = Strikeouts

Player	G	IP	W	L	ERA	SO
Dutch Ruether	35	267.1	21	12	3.53	89
Burleigh Grimes	36	259.0	17	14	4.76	99
Dazzy Vance	36	245.2	18	12	3.70	134
Leon Cadore	29	190.1	8	15	4.35	49

==== Other pitchers ====
Note: G = Games pitched; IP = Innings pitched; W = Wins; L = Losses; ERA = Earned run average; SO = Strikeouts

Player	G	IP	W	L	ERA	SO
Sherry Smith	28	108.2	4	8	4.56	15
Harry Shriver	25	108.1	4	6	2.99	38
Al Mamaux	37	87.2	1	4	3.70	35
Clarence Mitchell	5	12.2	0	3	14.21	1

==== Relief pitchers ====
Note: G = Games pitched; W = Wins; L = Losses; SV = Saves; ERA = Earned run average; SO = Strikeouts

Player	G	W	L	SV	ERA	SO
Art Decatur	29	3	4	1	2.77	31
Ray Gordinier	5	0	0	0	8.74	5
Jim Murray	4	0	0	1	4.50	3
Paul Schreiber	1	0	0	0	0.00	0
