= 1922 St. Louis Cardinals season =

Major League Baseball season

1922 St. Louis Cardinals
- League: National League
- Ballpark: Sportsman's Park
- City: St. Louis, Missouri
- Record: 85–69 (.552)
- League place: 3rd
- Owners: Sam Breadon
- Managers: Branch Rickey

The 1922 St. Louis Cardinals season was the team's 41st season in St. Louis, Missouri and its 31st season in the National League. The Cardinals went 85–69 during the season and finished tied for third place with the Pirates in the National League. This was the first season to feature the now-famous birds on bat logo.

== Offseason ==
The club, just as it was preparing to leave for spring training, lost Bill "Pickles" Dillhoefer, a backup catcher, who died of pneumonia on February 23.

== Regular season ==
The 1922 season was a milestone year in the career of Rogers Hornsby. He became the only player in history to hit over 40 home runs and bat over .400 in the same season. Hornsby won the triple crown, leading the league in almost every batting category including batting average (.401), home runs (42, a National League record at the time), RBI (152), slugging average (.722, another record at the time), on-base percentage (.459), doubles (46), hits (250, again the highest in National League history to that point), and runs scored (141). His 450 total bases was the highest mark for any National League player during the 20th century. Hornsby also produced in the field, leading the league in putouts, double plays, and fielding percentage.

=== Season standings ===
National League
Team	W	L	Pct.	GB	Home	Road
New York Giants	93	61	.604	—	51‍–‍27	42‍–‍34
Cincinnati Reds	86	68	.558	7	48‍–‍29	38‍–‍39
St. Louis Cardinals	85	69	.552	8	42‍–‍35	43‍–‍34
Pittsburgh Pirates	85	69	.552	8	45‍–‍33	40‍–‍36
Chicago Cubs	80	74	.519	13	39‍–‍37	41‍–‍37
Brooklyn Robins	76	78	.494	17	44‍–‍34	32‍–‍44
Philadelphia Phillies	57	96	.373	35½	35‍–‍41	22‍–‍55
Boston Braves	53	100	.346	39½	32‍–‍43	21‍–‍57

=== Record vs. opponents ===
1922 National League record Sources:
Team	BSN	BRO	CHC	CIN	NYG	PHI	PIT	STL
Boston	—	7–15	4–18	5–17	8–14–1	8–13	10–12	11–11
Brooklyn	15–7	—	11–11	8–14	8–14–1	15–7	11–11	8–14
Chicago	18–4	11–11	—	11–11–1	8–14	9–13–1	10–12	13–9
Cincinnati	17–5	14–8	11–11–1	—	10–12	15–7	11–11–1	8–14
New York	14–8–1	14–8–1	14–8	12–10	—	15–7	11–11	13–9
Philadelphia	13–8	7–15	13–9–1	7–15	7–15	—	3–19	7–15
Pittsburgh	12–10	11–11	12–10	11–11–1	11–11	19–3	—	9–13
St. Louis	11–11	14–8	9–13	14–8	9–13	15–7	13–9	—

=== Roster ===
1922 St. Louis Cardinals
Roster
Pitchers: Bill Bailey; Clyde Barfoot; Sid Benton; Bill Doak; Eddie Dyer; Marv Goodwin; Jesse Haines; Jack Knight; Lou North; Bill Pertica; Jeff Pfeffer; Epp Sell; Bill Sherdel; Johnny Stuart; Roy Walker	Catchers: Eddie Ainsmith; Verne Clemons; Harry McCurdy; Ernie Vick; Infielders: Jim Bottomley; Jack Fournier; Howard Freigau; Del Gainer; Rogers Hornsby; Doc Lavan; Milt Stock; Specs Toporcer	Outfielders: Ray Blades; Max Flack; Cliff Heathcote; Les Mann; Austin McHenry; Heinie Mueller; Joe Schultz; Burt Shotton; Jack Smith	Manager: Branch Rickey; Coaches: Joe Sugden; Ray Thomas

== Player stats ==
= Indicates team leader

= Indicates league leader

=== Batting ===
==== Starters by position ====
Note: Pos = Position; G = Games played; AB = At bats; H = Hits; Avg. = Batting average; HR = Home runs; RBI = Runs batted in

Pos	Player	G	AB	H	Avg.	HR	RBI
C	Eddie Ainsmith	119	379	111	.293	13	59
1B	Jack Fournier	128	404	119	.295	10	61
2B	Rogers Hornsby	154	623	250	.401	42	152
SS	Specs Toporcer	116	352	114	.324	3	36
3B	Milt Stock	151	581	177	.305	5	79
OF	Jack Smith	143	510	158	.310	8	46
OF	Joe Schultz	112	344	108	.314	2	64
OF	Max Flack	66	267	78	.292	2	21

==== Other batters ====
Note: G = Games played; AB = At bats; H = Hits; Avg. = Batting average; HR = Home runs; RBI = Runs batted in

Player	G	AB	H	Avg.	HR	RBI
Doc Lavan	89	264	60	.227	0	27
Austin McHenry	64	238	72	.303	5	43
Verne Clemons	71	160	41	.256	0	15
Heinie Mueller	61	159	43	.270	3	26
Jim Bottomley	37	151	49	.325	5	35
Les Mann	84	147	51	.347	2	20
Ray Blades	37	130	39	.300	3	21
Cliff Heathcote	34	98	24	.245	0	14
Del Gainer	43	97	26	.268	2	23
Burt Shotton	34	30	6	.200	0	2
Harry McCurdy	13	27	8	.296	0	5
Ernie Vick	3	6	2	.333	0	0
Howard Freigau	3	1	0	.000	0	0

=== Pitching ===
==== Starting pitchers ====
Note: G = Games pitched; IP = Innings pitched; W = Wins; L = Losses; ERA = Earned run average; SO = Strikeouts

Player	G	IP	W	L	ERA	SO
Jeff Pfeffer	44	261.1	19	12	3.58	83
Bill Sherdel	47	242.0	17	13	3.87	79
Jesse Haines	29	183.0	11	9	3.84	62
Bill Doak	37	180.1	11	13	5.54	73
Jack Knight	1	4.0	0	0	9.00	1

==== Other pitchers ====
Note: G = Games pitched; IP = Innings pitched; W = Wins; L = Losses; ERA = Earned run average; SO = Strikeouts

Player	G	IP	W	L	ERA	SO
Lou North	53	149.2	10	3	4.45	84
Bill Pertica	34	117.1	8	8	5.91	30
Epp Sell	7	33.0	4	2	6.82	5
Roy Walker	12	32.0	1	2	4.78	14
Johnny Stuart	2	2.0	0	0	9.00	1

==== Relief pitchers ====
Note: G = Games pitched; W = Wins; L = Losses; SV = Saves; ERA = Earned run average; SO = Strikeouts

Player	G	W	L	SV	ERA	SO
Clyde Barfoot	42	4	5	2	4.21	19
Bill Bailey	12	0	2	0	5.40	11
Marv Goodwin	2	0	0	0	2.25	0
Eddie Dyer	2	0	0	0	2.45	3
Jack Fournier	1	0	0	0	0.00	0
Sid Benton	1	0	0	0	----	0

== Awards and honors ==
=== League leaders ===
- Rogers Hornsby, National League batting champion

=== Records ===
- Rogers Hornsby, National League record, Most total bases by a second baseman, (450).
- Rogers Hornsby, National League record, Most hits by a second baseman, (250).
- Rogers Hornsby, National League record, Most home runs by a second baseman, (42).
- Rogers Hornsby, National League record, Most runs batted in by a second baseman, (152).

== Farm system ==
Level	Team	League	Manager
A	Houston Buffaloes	Texas League	George Whiteman and Roy Thomas
D	Corsicana Gumbo Busters	Texas–Oklahoma League	Chuck Miller and Harvey Grubb
