= 1922 Cincinnati Reds season =

1922 Cincinnati Reds
- League: National League
- Ballpark: Redland Field
- City: Cincinnati, Ohio
- Owners: Garry Herrmann
- Managers: Pat Moran

The 1922 Cincinnati Reds season was a season in American baseball. The team finished second in the National League with a record of 86–68, 7 games behind the New York Giants.

== Off-season ==
After suffering through a disappointing 1921 season, as the Reds finished in sixth place in the National League with a 70–83 record, the club made a couple of big moves over the winter months.

On December 6, the Reds and New York Giants made a big trade, as Cincinnati sent third baseman Heinie Groh to the Giants for outfielder George Burns, catcher Mike Gonzalez and $150,000 in cash. Burns was coming off a successful 1921 season with the Giants, as he hit .299 with four home runs, 61 RBI and 111 runs in 149 games. Burns also had 80 walks, which led the league. He played a key role for the Giants in their 1921 World Series victory over the New York Yankees, as Burns hit .333 with four doubles, two runs, two RBI and stole a base in eight games. Gonzalez, who played for Cincinnati in 1914, saw very limited action with the Giants, but he hit .375 in 12 games.

With the trade opening up a spot at third base, the Reds acquired Babe Pinelli from the Oakland Oaks of the Pacific Coast League. In 1921, Pinelli hit .339 with the Oaks. He had previous experience in the Major Leagues, as Pinelli appeared in 24 games with the Chicago White Sox in 1918, hitting .231 with a home run and seven RBI, and in 1920, he played for the Detroit Tigers, batting .229 with 31 RBI over 102 games.

In February, the Reds made another trade, as they sent shortstop Larry Kopf and pitcher Rube Marquard to the Boston Braves for pitcher Jack Scott. Scott appeared in a league high 47 games with the Braves in 1921, going 15–13 with a 3.70 ERA in 233.2 innings pitched.

== Regular season ==
After retooling the team after a disappointing 1921 season, the Reds were hoping to make another run at the National League pennant, however, the club got off to a horrible start of the season, going 1–10 in their first 11 games, knocking them into last place, 7.5 games behind the first place New York Giants.

The Reds managed to turn their season around, as by May 23, the club had a 17–8 record in their last 25 games, to reach the .500 level with at 18-18, sitting in fourth place, four games behind the Giants. By the end of May, the Reds were 22-24 and in sixth place.

In June, Cincinnati managed to get their record two games over .500, as they were 27–25 on June 8, following a 7–2 win over the Brooklyn Robins, however, the club lost their next seven games to drop to 27–32, and 11 games behind the Giants. Cincinnati then snapped out of their slump and won seven of their last eight games in the month to have a 34–33 record.

July was a successful month for the Reds, as they had a 19–14 record, bringing their overall record to 53–47, and while Cincinnati remained in fourth place, they were only seven games behind the first place Giants.

Cincinnati continued to rack up wins in August, going 15–10 in 25 games for a .600 winning percentage, however, the club actually dropped to fifth place by the end of the month, with a 68–57 record, and eight games out of first.

The club continued their hot play into September, however, they were too far behind New York and fell out of the pennant race. Over their last 29 games, the Reds earned a record of 18–11, and eventually finished the season in second place in the National League with a record of 86–68, but were seven games behind New York.

First baseman Jake Daubert had an excellent season at 38 years old, as he hit .336 with a team high 12 home runs and 66 RBI and 156 games. Daubert also led the Reds with 114 runs scored, 205 hits, and led the National League with 22 triples. Outfielder George Burns hit .285 with a home run, 53 RBI and scored 104 runs in his first season with the club. Outfielder George Harper, in his first season with the Reds after not playing in the Major Leagues since 1918, led the club with a .340 batting average, and had two home runs and 68 RBI in 128 games, filling in after Edd Roush missed most of the season due to an injury. Outfielder Pat Duncan hit a solid .328 with eight home runs and a team high 94 RBI in 151 games. The Reds new third baseman, Babe Pinelli, batted .305 with a home run and 72 RBI in 156 games.

Eppa Rixey led the pitching staff, as he earned a 25–13 record with a 3.53 ERA and 26 complete games over 313.1 innings pitched in 40 games. Johnny Couch, an under the radar acquisition by the team, earned a 16–9 record and a 3.89 ERA in 43 games, while 21 year old Pete Donohue, in his first full season as a starting pitcher, led the team with a 3.13 ERA, and posted a record of 18–9, which earned him the best winning percentage by a pitcher in the National League, in 33 games pitched.

=== Season standings ===
National League
Team	W	L	Pct.	GB	Home	Road
New York Giants	93	61	.604	—	51‍–‍27	42‍–‍34
Cincinnati Reds	86	68	.558	7	48‍–‍29	38‍–‍39
St. Louis Cardinals	85	69	.552	8	42‍–‍35	43‍–‍34
Pittsburgh Pirates	85	69	.552	8	45‍–‍33	40‍–‍36
Chicago Cubs	80	74	.519	13	39‍–‍37	41‍–‍37
Brooklyn Robins	76	78	.494	17	44‍–‍34	32‍–‍44
Philadelphia Phillies	57	96	.373	35½	35‍–‍41	22‍–‍55
Boston Braves	53	100	.346	39½	32‍–‍43	21‍–‍57

=== Record vs. opponents ===
1922 National League record Sources:
Team	BSN	BRO	CHC	CIN	NYG	PHI	PIT	STL
Boston	—	7–15	4–18	5–17	8–14–1	8–13	10–12	11–11
Brooklyn	15–7	—	11–11	8–14	8–14–1	15–7	11–11	8–14
Chicago	18–4	11–11	—	11–11–1	8–14	9–13–1	10–12	13–9
Cincinnati	17–5	14–8	11–11–1	—	10–12	15–7	11–11–1	8–14
New York	14–8–1	14–8–1	14–8	12–10	—	15–7	11–11	13–9
Philadelphia	13–8	7–15	13–9–1	7–15	7–15	—	3–19	7–15
Pittsburgh	12–10	11–11	12–10	11–11–1	11–11	19–3	—	9–13
St. Louis	11–11	14–8	9–13	14–8	9–13	15–7	13–9	—

=== Roster ===
1922 Cincinnati Reds
Roster
Pitchers: Johnny Couch; Pete Donohue; John Gillespie; Cactus Keck; Dolf Luque; Cliff Markle; Eppa Rixey; Karl Schnell; Jack Scott	Catchers: Bubbles Hargrave; Red Lutz; Ivey Wingo; Infielders: Sam Bohne; Rube Bressler; Ike Caveney; Jake Daubert; Lew Fonseca; Wally Kimmick; Babe Pinelli	Outfielders: George Burns; Pat Duncan; George Harper; Greasy Neale; Edd Roush	Manager: Pat Moran

== Player stats ==
=== Batting ===
==== Starters by position ====
Note: Pos = Position; G = Games played; AB = At bats; H = Hits; Avg. = Batting average; HR = Home runs; RBI = Runs batted in

Pos	Player	G	AB	H	Avg.	HR	RBI
C	Bubbles Hargrave	98	320	101	.316	7	57
1B	Jake Daubert	156	610	205	.336	12	66
2B	Sam Bohne	112	383	105	.274	3	51
SS	Ike Caveney	118	394	94	.239	3	54
3B	Babe Pinelli	156	547	167	.305	1	72
OF	George Burns	156	631	180	.285	1	53
OF	Pat Duncan	151	607	199	.328	8	94
OF	George Harper	128	430	146	.340	2	68

==== Other batters ====
Note: G = Games played; AB = At bats; H = Hits; Avg. = Batting average; HR = Home runs; RBI = Runs batted in

Player	G	AB	H	Avg.	HR	RBI
Lew Fonseca	81	291	105	.361	4	45
Ivey Wingo	80	260	74	.285	3	45
Edd Roush	49	165	58	.352	1	24
Wally Kimmick	39	89	22	.247	0	12
Rube Bressler	52	53	14	.264	0	8
Greasy Neale	25	43	10	.233	0	2
Red Lutz	1	1	1	1.000	0	0

=== Pitching ===
==== Starting pitchers ====
Note: G = Games pitched; IP = Innings pitched; W = Wins; L = Losses; ERA = Earned run average; SO = Strikeouts

Player	G	IP	W	L	ERA	SO
Eppa Rixey	40	313.1	25	13	3.53	80
Johnny Couch	43	264.0	16	9	3.89	45
Dolf Luque	39	261.0	13	23	3.31	79
Pete Donohue	33	242.0	18	9	3.12	66

==== Other pitchers ====
Note: G = Games pitched; IP = Innings pitched; W = Wins; L = Losses; ERA = Earned run average; SO = Strikeouts

Player	G	IP	W	L	ERA	SO
Cactus Keck	27	131.0	7	6	3.37	27
John Gillespie	31	77.2	3	3	4.52	21
Cliff Markle	25	75.2	4	5	3.81	34

==== Relief pitchers ====
Note: G = Games pitched; W = Wins; L = Losses; SV = Saves; ERA = Earned run average; SO = Strikeouts

Player	G	W	L	SV	ERA	SO
Karl Schnell	10	0	0	0	2.70	5
Jack Scott	1	0	0	0	9.00	0
