= Ralph Head =

American baseball player (1893-1962)

- Pitcher
- Born: August 30, 1893; Tallapoosa, Georgia, U.S.
- Died: October 8, 1962 (aged 69); Muscadine, Alabama, U.S.
- Batted: Right Threw: Right

MLB debut
- April 18, 1923, for the Philadelphia Phillies

Last MLB appearance
- October 6, 1923, for the Philadelphia Phillies

MLB statistics
- Win–loss record: 2–9
- Earned run average: 6.66
- Strikeouts: 24
- Stats at Baseball Reference

Teams
- Philadelphia Phillies (1923)

Ralph Head (August 30, 1893 – October 8, 1962) was an American professional baseball pitcher who played for the 1923 Philadelphia Phillies of Major League Baseball (MLB). Listed at 5 feet 10 inches (1.78 m) and 175 pounds (79 kg), he threw and batted right-handed.

== Biography ==
Head played minor league baseball during 1913–1917 and 1919–1931; he did not play professionally in 1918 due to military service. He pitched in over 400 minor league games, with a 153–137 win–loss record for seasons with records available.

Head spent the 1923 season with the Philadelphia Phillies, his only major league season. In 35 games (13 starts) he compiled a 2–9 record with a 6.66 earned run average, while striking out 24 batters in 132 1/3 innings pitched. The Phillies finished last in the National League in 1923, with a 50–104 record. Two games that Head pitched in are historically notable:

- Head's start against the New York Giants on June 1, 1923, became the first game in baseball's modern era (since 1900) that a team scored in all nine innings; accomplished by the Giants, in a 22–8 victory. Head allowed six runs on six hits, facing 14 batters in 1 2/3 innings of work, and was the losing pitcher of the game.
- Head's final game in the major leagues, played on October 6, 1923, featured shortstop Ernie Padgett of the Boston Braves executing an unassisted triple play. The Phillies lost to the Braves, 4–1, with Head scoring the Phillies' only run.

Head was born in 1893 in Tallapoosa, Georgia. He served in the United States Army during World War I, as a private first class in Company A of the 328th Infantry Regiment; he was wounded in action in October 1918 in Sommerance, France. He died in 1962 in Muscadine, Alabama, and was interred in his hometown.
