= Tom McNamara (baseball) =

American baseball player (1895–1974)

- Pinch hitter
- Born: November 5, 1895; Roxbury, Boston, U.S.
- Died: May 5, 1974 (aged 78); Danvers, Massachusetts, U.S.
- Batted: Right Threw: Right

MLB debut
- June 25, 1922, for the Pittsburgh Pirates

Last MLB appearance
- June 25, 1922, for the Pittsburgh Pirates

MLB statistics
- Games played: 1
- At bats: 1
- Hits: 0
- Stats at Baseball Reference

Teams
- Pittsburgh Pirates (1922)

Thomas Henry McNamara (November 5, 1895 – May 5, 1974) was an American professional baseball player. He appeared in one game in Major League Baseball during the 1922 season for the Pittsburgh Pirates as a pinch hitter. Listed at 6 ft 2 in (1.88 m), 200 lb, he batted and threw right-handed.

Born in Roxbury, Massachusetts, McNamara attended Princeton University from 1919 to 1922 and came to the majors for one game on June 25, 1922. Primarily an outfielder, he was used as a pinch hitter by Pirates manager George Gibson in the fifth inning of game against the Cincinnati Reds, replacing pitcher Hal Carlson. McNamara grounded out, then was replaced in the field by Earl Hamilton. He never appeared in a major league game again.

The same year McNamara played in the Michigan–Ontario League with the Flint Vehicles, hitting for them a .313 average and three home runs in 13 games.

McNamara died in Danvers, Massachusetts, at the age of 78.
