= Robert Russa Moton High School (disambiguation) =

Robert Russa Moton High School was a former high school that is now the Robert Russa Moton Museum, a historic site and museum in Farmville, Prince Edward County, Virginia.

Robert Russa Moton High School may also refer to:

- Robert R. Moton High School in Sycamore, Alabama which operated from 1948–1970
- Robert R. Moton High School in Leeds, Alabama which operated from 1948–1970

== See also ==
- Robert Russa Moton § Legacy and honors for other institutions named for Robert Russa Moton
