= Art Gardiner =

American baseball player (1899-1954)

- Pitcher
- Born: December 26, 1899; Brooklyn, New York
- Died: October 21, 1954 (aged 54); Copiague, New York
- Batted: Right Threw: Right

MLB debut
- September 25, 1923, for the Philadelphia Phillies

Last MLB appearance
- September 25, 1923, for the Philadelphia Phillies

MLB statistics
- Games pitched: 1
- Innings pitched: 0
- Runs allowed: 0
- Stats at Baseball Reference

Teams
- Philadelphia Phillies (1923)

Arthur Cecil Gardiner (December 26, 1899 – October 21, 1954) was a Major League Baseball pitcher who played in one game for the Philadelphia Phillies on September 25, 1923.

On September 25, 1923, the Phillies were playing the Pittsburgh Pirates. Gardiner came into the game with two outs in the first inning, after starter Whitey Glazner allowed three hits and four earned runs. Gardiner faced two batters, and allowed one hit and one base on balls. He was then taken out of the game, and relieved by Jim Bishop. The Pirates won the game 18–5.
