= John Gillespie (baseball) =

American baseball player (1900–1954)

- Pitcher
- Born: February 25, 1900; Oakland, California, U.S.
- Died: February 15, 1954 (aged 53); Vallejo, California, U.S.
- Batted: Right Threw: Right

MLB debut
- April 12, 1922, for the Cincinnati Reds

Last appearance
- September 30, 1922, for the Cincinnati Reds

MLB statistics
- Win–loss record: 3–3
- Earned run average: 4.52
- Strikeouts: 21
- Stats at Baseball Reference

Teams
- Cincinnati Reds (1922)

John Patrick Gillespie (February 25, 1900 – February 15, 1954) was an American pitcher in Major League Baseball who played for the Cincinnati Reds in its 1922 season. Listed at 5' 11", 172 lb., he batted and threw right handed.

== Sources ==
- Career statistics from Baseball Reference · Baseball Reference (Minors) · Retrosheet · Baseball Almanac. or Retrosheet
