= Al Yeargin =

American baseball player (1901-1937)

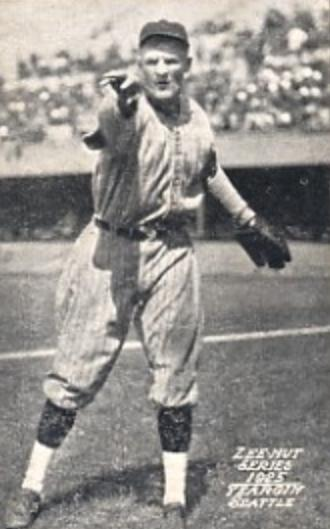
- Pitcher
- Born: October 16, 1901; Mauldin, South Carolina, U.S.
- Died: May 8, 1937 (aged 35); Greenville, South Carolina, U.S.
- Batted: Right Threw: Right

MLB debut
- October 1, 1922, for the Boston Braves

Last MLB appearance
- September 20, 1924, for the Boston Braves

MLB statistics
- Earned run average: 4.91
- Win–loss record: 1-12
- Strikeouts: 34
- Stats at Baseball Reference

Teams
- Boston Braves (1922, 1924)

James Almond Yeargin (October 16, 1901 – May 8, 1937) was an American professional baseball pitcher. He played for two seasons in Major League Baseball with the Boston Braves during the 1922 and 1924 seasons.
