= Tod Dennehey =

American baseball player

- Left fielder
- Born: May 12, 1899; Philadelphia, Pennsylvania
- Died: August 8, 1977 (aged 78); Philadelphia, Pennsylvania
- Batted: Left Threw: Left

MLB debut
- April 21, 1923, for the Philadelphia Phillies

Last MLB appearance
- May 8, 1923, for the Philadelphia Phillies

MLB statistics
- Batting average: .292
- Hits: 7
- Runs: 4
- Stats at Baseball Reference

Teams
- Philadelphia Phillies (1923)

Thomas Francis Dennehy (May 12, 1899 – August 8, 1977) was a Major League Baseball left fielder who played for one season. He played for the Philadelphia Phillies for nine games during the 1923 Philadelphia Phillies season.
