= Hank DeBerry =

American baseball player (1894–1951)

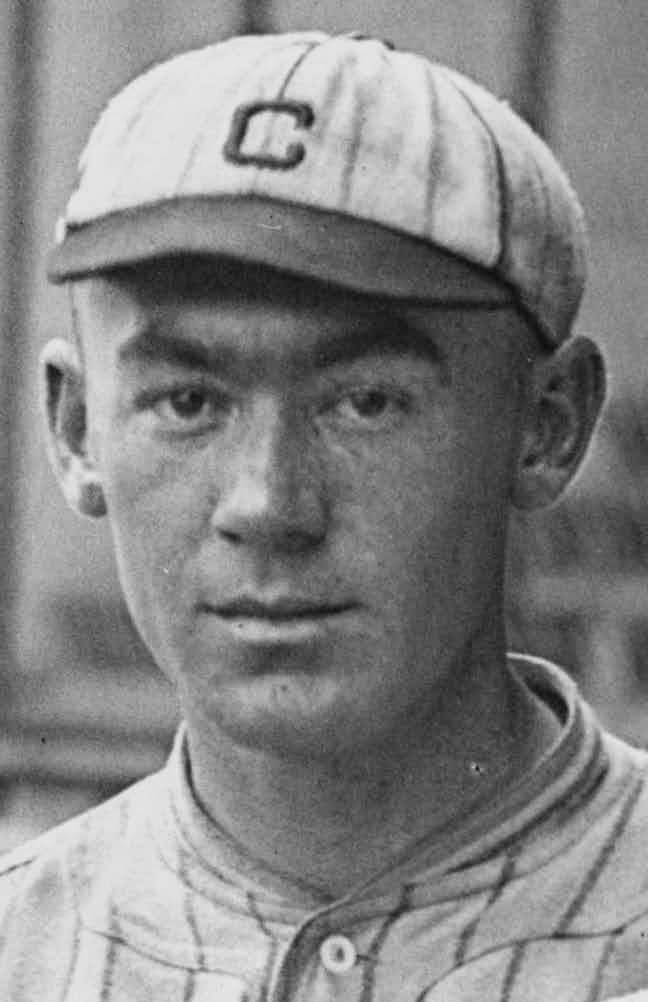
- Catcher
- Born: December 29, 1894; Savannah, Tennessee, U.S.
- Died: September 10, 1951 (aged 56); Savannah, Tennessee, U.S.
- Batted: Right Threw: Right

MLB debut
- September 12, 1916, for the Cleveland Indians

Last MLB appearance
- September 28, 1930, for the Brooklyn Robins

MLB statistics
- Batting average: .267
- Home runs: 11
- Runs batted in: 234
- Stats at Baseball Reference

Teams
- Cleveland Indians (1916–1917); Brooklyn Robins (1922–1930)

John Herman DeBerry (December 29, 1894 – September 10, 1951), was an American professional baseball player, and scout. He played as a catcher in Major League Baseball, most notably for the Brooklyn Robins during the 1920s. DeBerry was known for his defensive skills and for being the catcher for Baseball Hall of Fame pitcher Dazzy Vance.

== Baseball career ==
DeBerry was born in Savannah, Tennessee and attended the University of Tennessee. He began his professional baseball career in 1914 at the age of 19 with the Paducah Indians of the Kentucky–Illinois–Tennessee League. DeBerry made his major league debut with the Cleveland Indians on September 12, 1916, at the age of 21. DeBerry appeared in 25 games for the Indians in 1917, but spent most of the season playing for the Milwaukee Brewers of the American Association. He joined the United States Navy in 1918 during the First World War. DeBerry returned to professional baseball after the war, playing for the New Orleans Pelicans of the Southern Association from 1919 to 1921.

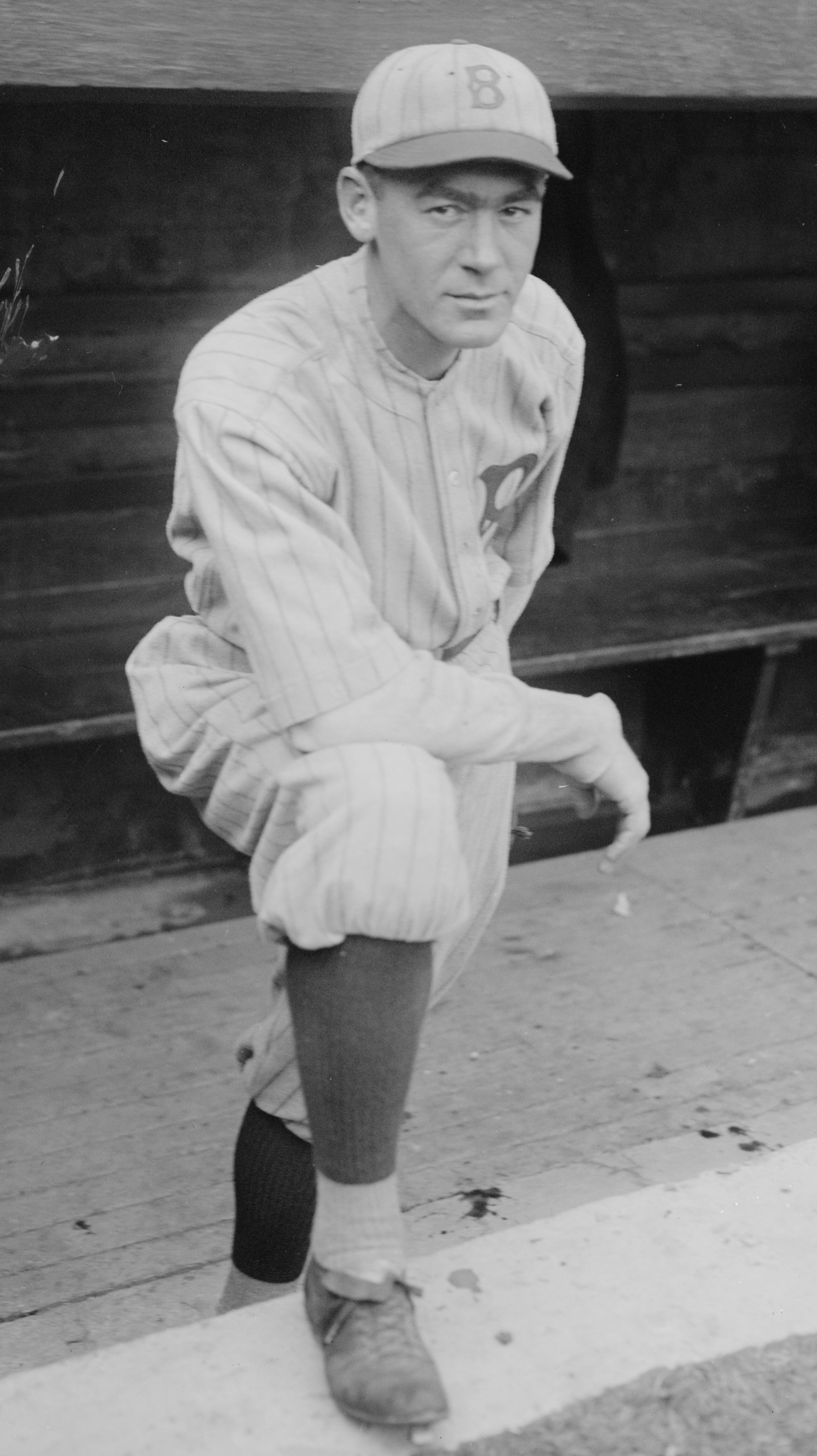
DeBerry in 1922

DeBerry returned to the major leagues in 1922 when the Brooklyn Robins purchased his contract from the Pelicans. Ironically, the Robins wanted to acquire DeBerry, but the Pelicans would not complete the deal unless Vance was included in the transaction. He was expected to be a backup catcher for Otto Miller however, Miller only appeared in 33 games and DeBerry caught the majority of the Robins' games that season. He finished the year with a career-high .301 batting average and was third among National League catchers in range factor. From 1923 to 1925, he shared catching duties with Zack Taylor.

It was during the 1920s that DeBerry developed his association with pitcher, Dazzy Vance and, the two players became known as one of the greatest batteries of their era. With DeBerry as his catcher, Vance led the National League in strikeouts for seven consecutive seasons between 1922 and 1928. Vance also twice led the league in wins. DeBerry caught the no hitter thrown by Vance on September 23, 1925. By 1930, the 35-year-old DeBerry was in decline and Al López had emerged as his successor. He played in his final major league game on September 28, 1930.

On January 19, 1931, the Robins traded DeBerry along with Eddie Moore to the Oakland Oaks of the Pacific Coast League for future Hall of Fame catcher, Ernie Lombardi. Later that year he signed to play for the Dallas Steers, but only appeared in five games and was released in July of that same year at the age of 36.

== Career statistics ==
In an eleven-year major league career, DeBerry played in 648 games, accumulating 494 hits in 1,850 at bats for a .267 career batting average, along with 11 home runs, 234 runs batted in and an on-base percentage of .323. He ended his career with a .982 fielding percentage, which was 7 points higher than the league average during his playing career.

== Later life ==
After his active playing career had ended, DeBerry became a manager in minor league baseball before becoming a scout for the New York Giants. He served as a scout for the Giants until his death on September 10, 1951 at the age of 56 in Savannah, Tennessee.

== See also ==
- List of Major League Baseball single-game hits leaders
