= Jim Grant (baseball) =

American baseball player (1894–1985)

- Pitcher
- Born: August 4, 1894; Coalville, Iowa
- Died: November 30, 1985 (aged 91); Des Moines, Iowa
- Batted: Right Threw: Left

MLB debut
- April 21, 1923, for the Philadelphia Phillies

Last MLB appearance
- April 30, 1923, for the Philadelphia Phillies

MLB statistics
- Games played: 2
- Innings pitched: 4
- Earned runs: 6
- Stats at Baseball Reference

Teams
- Philadelphia Phillies (1923)

James Ronald Grant (August 4, 1894 – November 30, 1985) was a pitcher in Major League Baseball who played briefly for the Philadelphia Phillies during the 1923 season. Listed at 5 ft 11 in (1.80 m), 180 lb., Grant batted right-handed and threw left-handed. He was born in Coalville, Iowa.

Grant, who played most of his career in the minor leagues, pitched from 1916 to 1923 for the Des Moines Boosters and Sioux City Packers of the defunct Western League before joining the Phillies. In two relief appearances for Philadelphia, Grant posted a 13.50 earned run average in 4.0 innings of work, giving up eight runs (two unearned) on 10 hits and four walks. He did not get a decision and was not credited with a save or a strikeout.

Following his majors stint, Grant pitched for the Waterloo Hawks (1926–1928) and Shreveport Sports (1930), before returning to Des Moines (now the Demons) for three and a half seasons (1930–1933). He collected a 106–61 record in ten minor league seasons.

Grant died in Des Moines, Iowa, at the age of 91.

== See also ==
- 1923 Philadelphia Phillies season

== Sources ==
- Career statistics from Baseball Reference, or Baseball Reference (Minors)
- Retrosheet
