= Jake Miller (outfielder) =

American baseball player (1895–1974)

- Outfielder
- Born: December 1, 1895; Baltimore, Maryland, U.S.
- Died: August 24, 1974 (aged 78); Towson, Maryland, U.S.
- Batted: Right Threw: Right

MLB debut
- July 15, 1922, for the Pittsburgh Pirates

Last MLB appearance
- July 17, 1922, for the Pittsburgh Pirates

MLB statistics
- Batting average: .091 (1-for-11)
- RBI: 0
- Home runs: 0
- Stats at Baseball Reference

Teams
- Pittsburgh Pirates (1922)

Jacob George Miller (born Jacob George Muenzing; December 1, 1895 – August 24, 1974) was an American professional baseball outfielder who played in three games for the 1922 Pittsburgh Pirates of Major League Baseball (MLB).

Miller began his professional baseball career with the Mobile Bears of the Southern Association in 1913. After his major league appearances, he continued to play minor league baseball, his last team being the Hagerstown Hubs in 1930. His career minor league batting average was .303.

He was born in Baltimore, Maryland, and died in Towson, Maryland, at the age of 78.
