= Broadway Jones (baseball player) =

American baseball player (1898-1977)

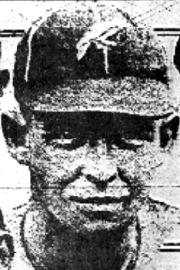
- Pitcher
- Born: November 15, 1898; Millsboro, Delaware
- Died: September 7, 1977 (aged 78); Lewes, Delaware
- Batted: Right Threw: Right

MLB debut
- July 4, 1923, for the Philadelphia Phillies

Last MLB appearance
- July 13, 1923, for the Philadelphia Phillies

MLB statistics
- Win–loss record: 0–0
- Earned run average: 9.00
- Strikeouts: 1
- Stats at Baseball Reference

Teams
- Philadelphia Phillies (1923)

Jesse Frank "Broadway" Jones (November 15, 1898 – September 7, 1977) was a pitcher in Major League Baseball. He had three appearances, all in relief, for the Philadelphia Phillies in 1923.
