= Clyde Barfoot =

American baseball player (1891–1971)

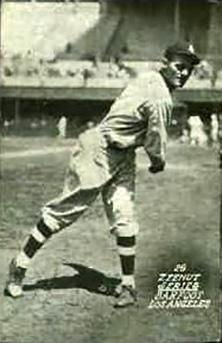
- Pitcher
- Born: July 8, 1891; Richmond, Virginia, U.S.
- Died: March 11, 1971 (aged 79); Highland Park, California, U.S.
- Batted: Right Threw: Right

MLB debut
- April 13, 1922, for the St. Louis Cardinals

Last MLB appearance
- May 24, 1926, for the Detroit Tigers

Career statistics
- Win–loss record: 8–10
- Earned run average: 4.10
- Strikeouts: 49
- Stats at Baseball Reference

Teams
- St. Louis Cardinals (1922–1923); Detroit Tigers (1926)

Clyde Raymond Barfoot (July 8, 1891 – March 11, 1971), nicknamed "Foots", was an American baseball player. He played professional baseball as a right-handed pitcher 25 years from 1914 to 1938, including three seasons in Major League Baseball with the St. Louis Cardinals (1922–1923) and Detroit Tigers (1926).

== Early years ==
Barfoot was born in Richmond, Virginia, in 1891.

== Professional baseball ==
Barfoot began his professional baseball career playing in the minor leagues for the Chattanooga Lookouts (1914), Galveston Pirates (1914–1917), San Antonio Bronchos (1917–1920), Newark Bears (1918), Columbus Senators (1918), New Orleans Pelicans (1920), and Houston Buffaloes (1921).

After compiling a 22–13 record with Houston in 1922, he got a shot at playing in the major leagues. He made his major league debut with the St. Louis Cardinals on April 13, 1922, at age 30. He appeared in 42 games for the 1922 St. Louis Cardinals team, 40 of those as a relief pitcher. He compiled a 4-5 win–loss record with a 4.21 earned run average (ERA). He led the National League in 1922 with six saves and 25 games finished. He continued with the Cardinals in 1923, compiling a 3–3 record with a 3.73 ERA in 31 relief appearances and two starts.

After his two years in the majors, Barfoot returned to the minors, playing for the Houston Buffaloes in 1924 and compiling a 19–12 record. In 1925, he moved to the Pacific Coast League where he compiled a career best 26–15 record with the Vernon Tigers.

In the winter before the 1926 season, the Detroit Tigers purchased Barfoot and Jack Warner for $40,000 and players. He appeared in 11 games for the Tigers in 1926, 10 as a relief pitcher, and compiled a 1–2 record and a 4.88 ERA. He appeared in his final major league game on May 24, 1926. He had a major league career record of 8–10 in 250 1/3 innings, with an ERA of 4.10, five complete games, 55 games finished, 49 strikeouts, and 66 bases on balls.

Barfoot was 30 years old when he made his major league debut as a relief pitcher for the St. Louis Cardinals in 1920. A longtime star in the Texas League, Pacific Coast League (PCL), and Southern Association, he won 314 minor league games in a career that spanned 25 years.

Barfoot was an excellent hitter for a pitcher. In 1922, he had a .353 batting average, a .421 on-base percentage, and a .441 slugging percentage in 34 at bats. On October 9, 1926, Barfoot went 3-for-5 in a PCL game with three home runs and nine runs batted in. On October 15, 1925, Barfoot pitched 15 innings in a PCL victory over Los Angeles and hit two home runs to win the game, 6–5. Barfoot won 25 games in 1925.

== Later years ==
Barfoot died in 1971 in Highland Park, California, at age 79.
