= Karl Schnell =

American baseball player (1899–1992)

- Pitcher
- Born: September 20, 1899; Los Angeles, California, U.S.
- Died: May 31, 1992 (aged 92); Palo Alto, California, U.S.
- Batted: Right Threw: Right

MLB debut
- April 24, 1922, for the Cincinnati Reds

Last MLB appearance
- April 19, 1923, for the Cincinnati Reds
- Stats at Baseball Reference

Teams
- Cincinnati Reds (1922–1923)

Karl Otto Schnell (September 20, 1899 – May 31, 1992) was an American Major League Baseball pitcher.

Schnell attended Saint Mary's College of California. He played for the Cincinnati Reds in 1922 and 1923.

In 11 appearances over two seasons, Schnell was 0–0 with an earned run average of 4.29, with 21 innings pitched, allowing 23 hits, 14 runs, 10 earned runs, 20 bases on balls, 5 strikeouts and 6 games finished.

Schnell died on May 31, 1992. He was interred at Alta Mesa Memorial Park.
