= Joe Matthews (baseball) =

American baseball player (1898-1968)

- Pitcher
- Born: September 29, 1898; Baltimore, Maryland
- Died: February 8, 1968 (aged 69); Hagerstown, Maryland
- Batted: Both Threw: Left

MLB debut
- September 18, 1922, for the Boston Braves

Last MLB appearance
- September 22, 1922, for the Boston Braves

MLB statistics
- Win–loss record: 0–1
- Strikeouts: 0
- Earned run average: 3.60
- Stats at Baseball Reference

Teams
- Boston Braves (1921)

John Joseph Matthews (September 29, 1898 – February 8, 1968) was an American professional baseball player who played in three games for the Boston Braves during the 1921 season. He was born in Baltimore, Maryland, and died in Hagerstown at the age of 69.
