= John Singleton (athlete) =

American baseball and football player (1896–1937)

- Pitcher
- Born: November 27, 1896; Gallipolis, Ohio, U.S.
- Died: October 23, 1937 (aged 40); Dayton, Ohio, U.S.
- Batted: Right Threw: Right

MLB debut
- June 8, 1922, for the Philadelphia Phillies

Last MLB appearance
- September 22, 1922, for the Philadelphia Phillies

MLB statistics
- Win–loss record: 1–10
- Earned run average: 5.90
- Strikeouts: 27
- Stats at Baseball Reference

Teams
- Philadelphia Phillies (1922)

John Singleton
No. 4
- Positions: Halfback, wingback

Personal information
- Born: November 27, 1896; Gallipolis, Ohio, U.S.
- Died: October 23, 1937 (aged 40); Dayton, Ohio, U.S.

Career history
- Dayton Triangles (1929)
- Stats at Pro Football Reference

John Edward "Sheriff" Singleton (November 27, 1896 – October 23, 1937) was an American Major League Baseball pitcher and National Football League (NFL) halfback and wingback. As a baseball player, Singleton was a member of the Philadelphia Phillies in the 1922 season. In 22 career games, he had a 1–10 record with a 5.90 ERA. He batted and threw right-handed. In football, he played in five games for the Dayton Triangles in 1929.

Singleton was born in Gallipolis, Ohio and died in Dayton, Ohio.
