= Ray Gordinier =

American baseball player (1892-1960)

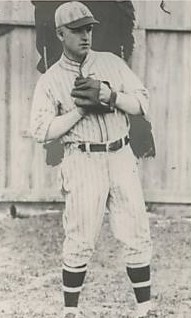
- Pitcher
- Born: April 11, 1892; Rochester, New York
- Died: November 15, 1960 (aged 68); Rochester, New York
- Batted: Switch Threw: Right

MLB debut
- September 17, 1921, for the Brooklyn Robins

Last MLB appearance
- May 17, 1922, for the Brooklyn Robins

MLB statistics
- Win–loss record: 1–0
- Earned run average: 6.94
- Strikeouts: 9
- Stats at Baseball Reference

Teams
- Brooklyn Robins (1921–1922)

Raymond Cornelius Gordinier (April 11, 1892 in Rochester, New York – November 15, 1960) was a pitcher in Major League Baseball. He pitched in eight games for the Brooklyn Robins during the 1921–1922 baseball seasons.

== Early life ==
Raymond Gordinier was born in Rochester, New York. He had a brother named William.

In 1910, he played halfback for the Rochester Scalpers American football team.

== Baseball career ==
In 1915, Gordinier started his professional baseball career with the Philadelphia Athletics. However, he failed to meet the team's standard and was transferred to the Newport News Shipbuilders in the Virginia League until 1916. He was then drafted to the St. Louis Cardinals and released to the Lincoln Links of the Western League.

Following the Selective Service Act of 1917, Gordinier found essential work. In 1919, the Cardinals released him to the Houston Buffaloes of the Texas League. He finished the season with the Buffalo Bisons in the International League. He played ten games with Buffalo, winning seven and losing three. He remained there until the fall of 1921, when he was purchased by the Brooklyn Robins.

He trained and played multiple games with the Robins, before being placed with the Reading Aces in the International League. He was then transferred to the Rochester Tribe of the same league.

In 1927, he played with the Toronto Maple Leafs in the International League, before retiring from professional baseball.

He continued to play as a semi-pro, playing for the Jersey City Skeeters in May 1927. In August 1928, he played for the Copleys. In September, he played for the Island Cottage Pontiacs.

== Personal life ==
Gordinier married Jeannette Murphy on October 24, 1917. They had a daughter (Jeanette) and two sons (Arthur and Robert). Outside of baseball, Gordinier ran a heating system company in Rochester. He also ran a milk company at one point.

Gordinier died on November 15, 1960, and was buried on November 18 at Holy Sepulchre Cemetery.
