= Red Miller (baseball) =

American baseball player (1897-1973)

- Pitcher
- Born: February 11, 1897; Philadelphia, Pennsylvania, U.S.
- Died: October 20, 1973 (aged 76); Orlando, Florida, U.S.
- Batted: Right Threw: Right

MLB debut
- July 13, 1923, for the Philadelphia Phillies

Last MLB appearance
- July 13, 1923, for the Philadelphia Phillies

MLB statistics
- Games pitched: 1
- Earned run average: 32.40
- Innings pitched: 1.2
- Stats at Baseball Reference

Teams
- Philadelphia Phillies (1923)

Leo Alphonso "Red" Miller (February 11, 1897 – October 20, 1973) was an American Major League Baseball pitcher. Miller played for the Philadelphia Phillies in the 1923 season. In one career game, he had a 0-0 record with a 32.40 ERA. Miller allowed six runs on six hits, in 1.7 innings pitched. He batted and threw right-handed.

Miller was born in Philadelphia, Pennsylvania and died in Orlando, Florida.
