= Ike Caveney =

American baseball player (1894–1949)

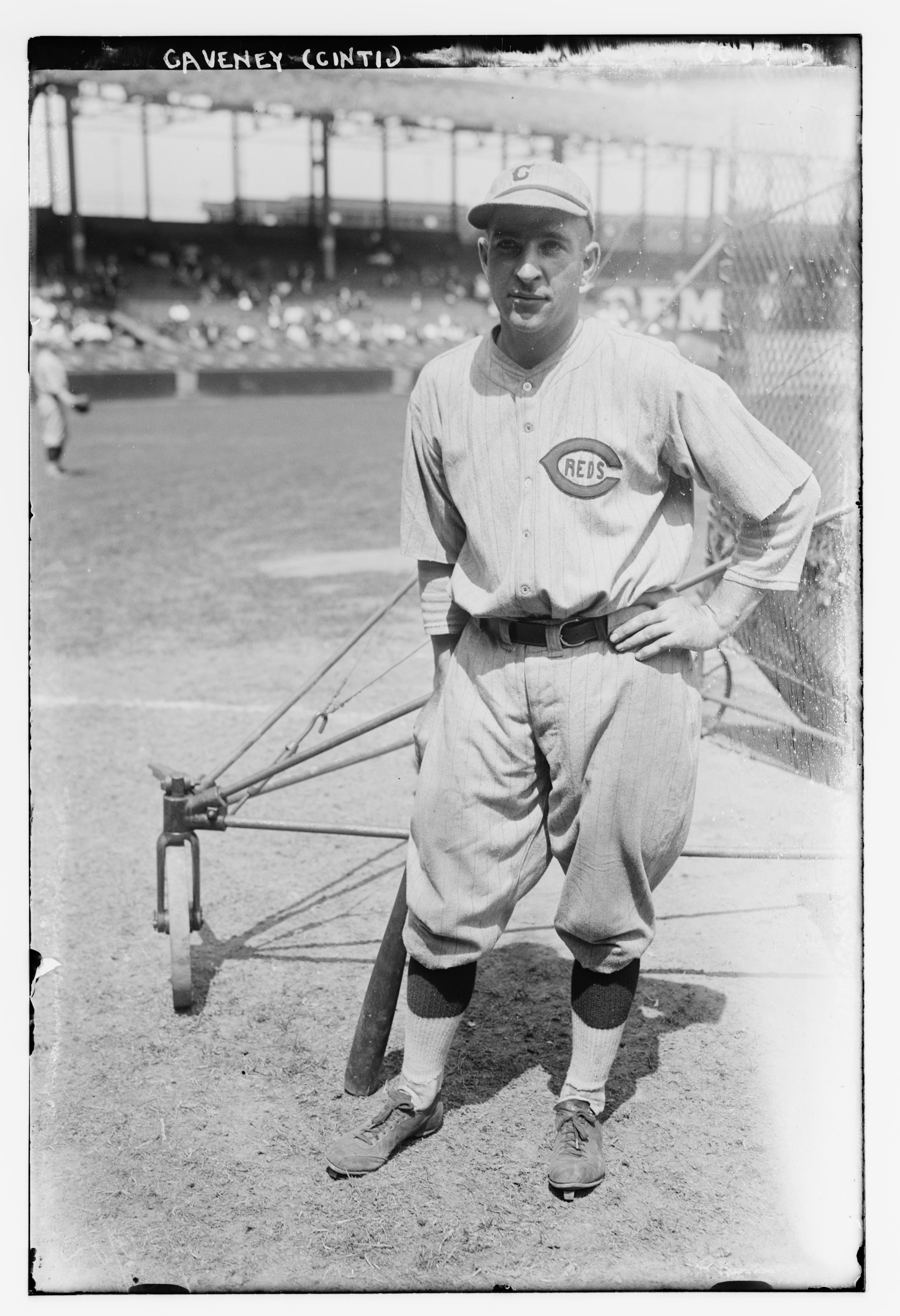
- Shortstop
- Born: December 10, 1894; San Francisco, California, U.S.
- Died: July 6, 1949 (aged 54); San Francisco, California, U.S.
- Batted: Right Threw: Right

MLB debut
- April 12, 1922, for the Cincinnati Reds

Last MLB appearance
- September 27, 1925, for the Cincinnati Reds

MLB statistics
- Batting average: .260
- Home runs: 13
- Runs batted in: 196
- Stats at Baseball Reference

Teams
- Cincinnati Reds (1922–1925)

James Christopher "Ike" Caveney (December 10, 1894 – July 6, 1949) was an American Major League Baseball shortstop who played for the Cincinnati Reds from 1922 to 1925. He later became the player-manager for the San Francisco Seals of the Pacific Coast League from 1932 to 1934.

== Early life ==
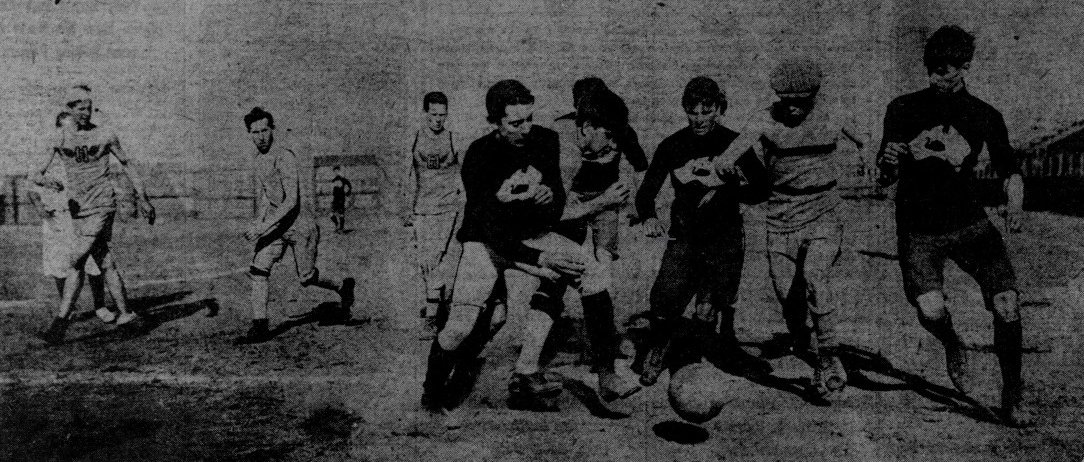
Caveney (playing in a cap) chasing the football on the far right

Caveney was raised in San Francisco. Later in life, he went on to coach the touring junior baseball team and Australian rules football at several San Francisco schools.

== Playing career ==
Caveney began his playing career in 1914 and became the starting shortstop for the San Francisco Seals from 1918 to 1921. In 1922, he was part of a new left side of the infield for the Cincinnati Reds. His best season was 1923 when he had a .277 batting average and was one of the top defensive shortstops in the National League. Injuries forced him to quit at the end of 1925.

In 1926, he returned to the Pacific Coast League playing for the Oakland Oaks for a partial season and a full season in 1927. In 1928, he was traded to the San Francisco Seals where he played until 1934.

== Managing career ==
From 1932 to 1934, Caveney was the player-manager for the Seals. Although the Seals won the PCL pennant in 1931 and 1935, they were beaten by the Los Angeles Angels in 1933 and 1934 for the title.

The most well-known aspect of his managing career is the early development of Joe DiMaggio's career. Vince DiMaggio was signed by the team in 1932 and towards the end of the season Augie Galan, the starting shortstop, requested to be able to miss the final four games of the season to vacation in Hawaii. The team would be left without a shortstop, so Vince suggested to Caveney that his little brother, playing semi-pro ball at the time, could fill in for a few games, and Caveney agreed. Although he did not play great in the few games, he was invited to the Seals spring training the next season, when he made the opening day team. Joe DiMaggio's defensive play at shortstop was plagued by errors, both fielding errors and overthrowing first base, which persisted into the regular season in 1933. Frustrated by play, Caveney moved Joe into the outfield in the fourth game of the season which became his position for the remainder of the season and his career.

Caveney was replaced after the 1934 season by Lefty O'Doul.

== Personal life ==
Caveney was charged with manslaughter following the death of a Japanese man outside a pool hall in San Francisco in 1919. The victim was punched in the head during a fight and suffered a fractured skull. Caveney was acquitted after witnesses failed to identify him as the puncher.
