= Sam Post =

American baseball player

- First baseman
- Born: November 17, 1896; Richmond, Virginia, U.S.
- Died: March 31, 1971 (aged 74); Portsmouth, Virginia, U.S.
- Batted: Left Threw: Left

MLB debut
- April 22, 1922, for the Brooklyn Robins

Last MLB appearance
- May 11, 1922, for the Brooklyn Robins

MLB statistics
- Batting average: .280
- Home runs: 0
- Runs batted in: 4
- Stats at Baseball Reference

Teams
- Brooklyn Robins (1922)

Samuel Gilbert Post (November 17, 1896 in Richmond, Virginia – March 31, 1971 in Portsmouth, Virginia), was an American professional baseball player who played first base in nine games for the 1922 Brooklyn Robins.

He was later the manager of the Salem Witches in the New England League during the 1930 season.
