= Jim Murray (pitcher) =

American baseball player (1894-1973)

- Pitcher
- Born: December 31, 1894; Scranton, Pennsylvania, U.S.
- Died: July 15, 1973 (aged 78); Jamaica, New York, U.S.
- Batted: Switch Threw: Left

MLB debut
- July 3, 1922, for the Brooklyn Robins

Last MLB appearance
- September 24, 1922, for the Brooklyn Robins

MLB statistics
- Win–loss record: 0–0
- Earned run average: 4.50
- Strikeouts: 3
- Stats at Baseball Reference

Teams
- Brooklyn Robins (1922)

James Francis Murray (December 31, 1894 in Scranton, Pennsylvania – July 15, 1973 in Jamaica, New York) was an American pitcher in Major League Baseball. He pitched in four games for the Brooklyn Robins during the 1922 baseball season. He attended Syracuse University and Villanova University.
