= Sid Benton =

American baseball player (1894–1977)

- Pitcher
- Born: August 4, 1894; Buckner, Arkansas
- Died: March 8, 1977 (aged 82); Fayetteville, Arkansas
- Batted: Right Threw: Right

MLB debut
- April 18, 1922, for the St. Louis Cardinals

Last MLB appearance
- April 18, 1922, for the St. Louis Cardinals

MLB statistics
- Win–loss record: 0–0
- Earned run average: 0.00
- Strikeouts: 0
- Stats at Baseball Reference

Teams
- St. Louis Cardinals (1922)

Sidney Wright Benton (August 4, 1894 – March 8, 1977) was a Major League Baseball pitcher. Benton played for St. Louis Cardinals in the 1922 season. He played just one game in his career, facing two batters and walking both of them. He attended the University of Arkansas.
