= Epp Sell =

American baseball player (1897–1961)

- Pitcher
- Born: April 26, 1897; Llewellyn, Pennsylvania, U.S.
- Died: February 19, 1961 (aged 63); Reading, Pennsylvania, U.S.
- Batted: Right Threw: Right

MLB debut
- September 1, 1922, for the St. Louis Cardinals

Last MLB appearance
- May 29, 1923, for the St. Louis Cardinals

MLB statistics
- Win–loss record: 4-3
- Earned run average: 6.56
- Strikeouts: 7
- Stats at Baseball Reference

Teams
- St. Louis Cardinals (1922–1923)

Lester Elwood "Epp" Sell (April 26, 1897 – February 19, 1961) was an American pitcher in Major League Baseball. He played for the St. Louis Cardinals.
