= Tim McNamara (baseball) =

American baseball player (1898–1994)

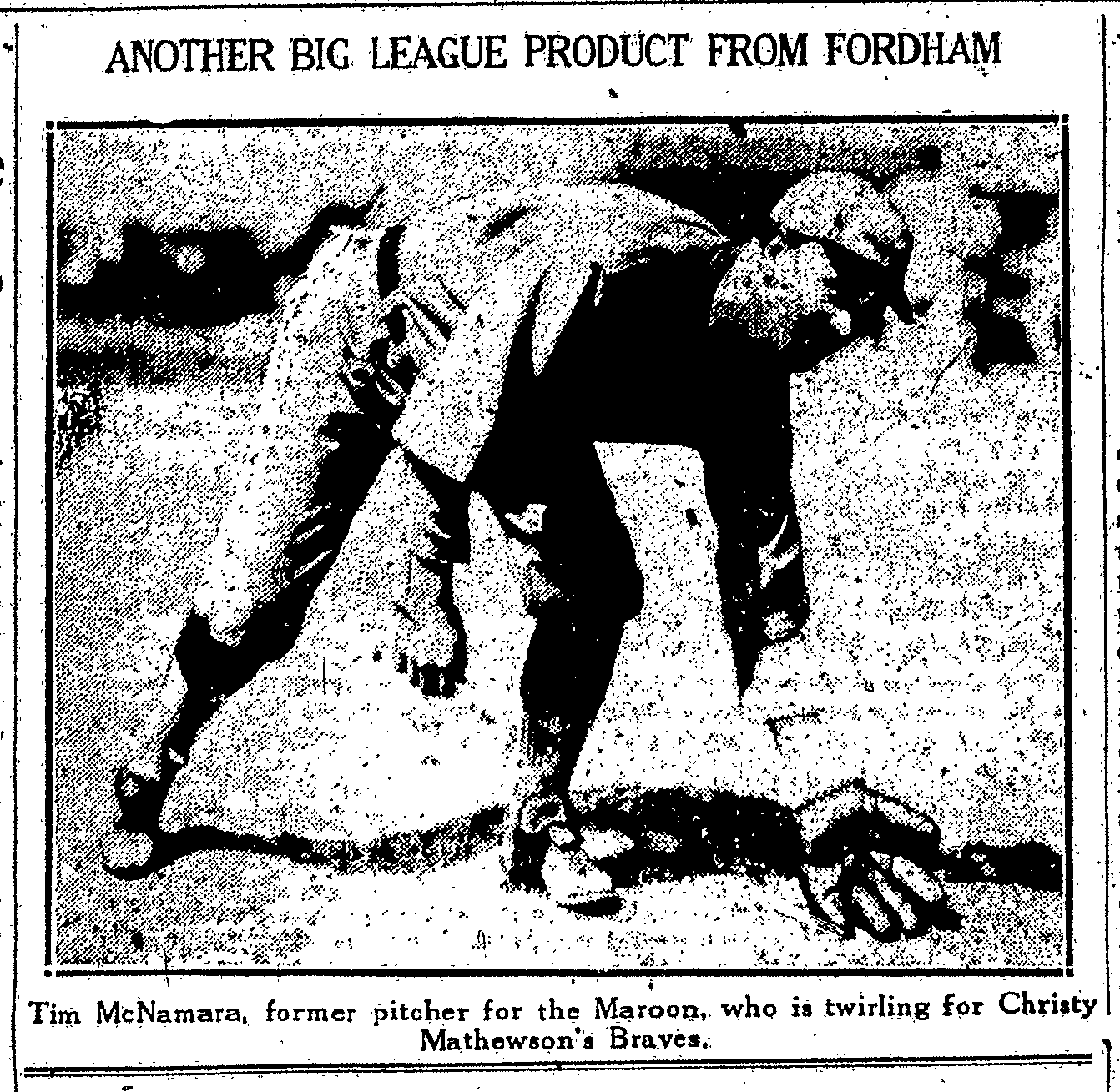
- McNamara in 1923
- Pitcher
- Born: November 20, 1898; Millville, Massachusetts, U.S.
- Died: November 5, 1994 (aged 95); North Smithfield, Rhode Island, U.S.
- Batted: Right Threw: Right

MLB debut
- June 27, 1922, for the Boston Braves

Last MLB appearance
- May 15, 1926, for the New York Giants

MLB statistics
- Win–loss record: 14–29
- Earned run average: 4.78
- Strikeouts: 88
- Stats at Baseball Reference

Teams
- Boston Braves (1922–1925); New York Giants (1926)

Timothy Augustine McNamara (November 20, 1898 – November 5, 1994) was an American pitcher in Major League Baseball who played from 1922 through 1926 for the Boston Braves and New York Giants.

Over five seasons (1922–26) and 98 appearances including 42 starts, McNamara posted a 14–29 won-loss record with a 4.78 ERA in 395.2 innings pitched with 88 strikeouts and four shutouts.
