= Stuffy Stewart =

American baseball player (1894–1980)

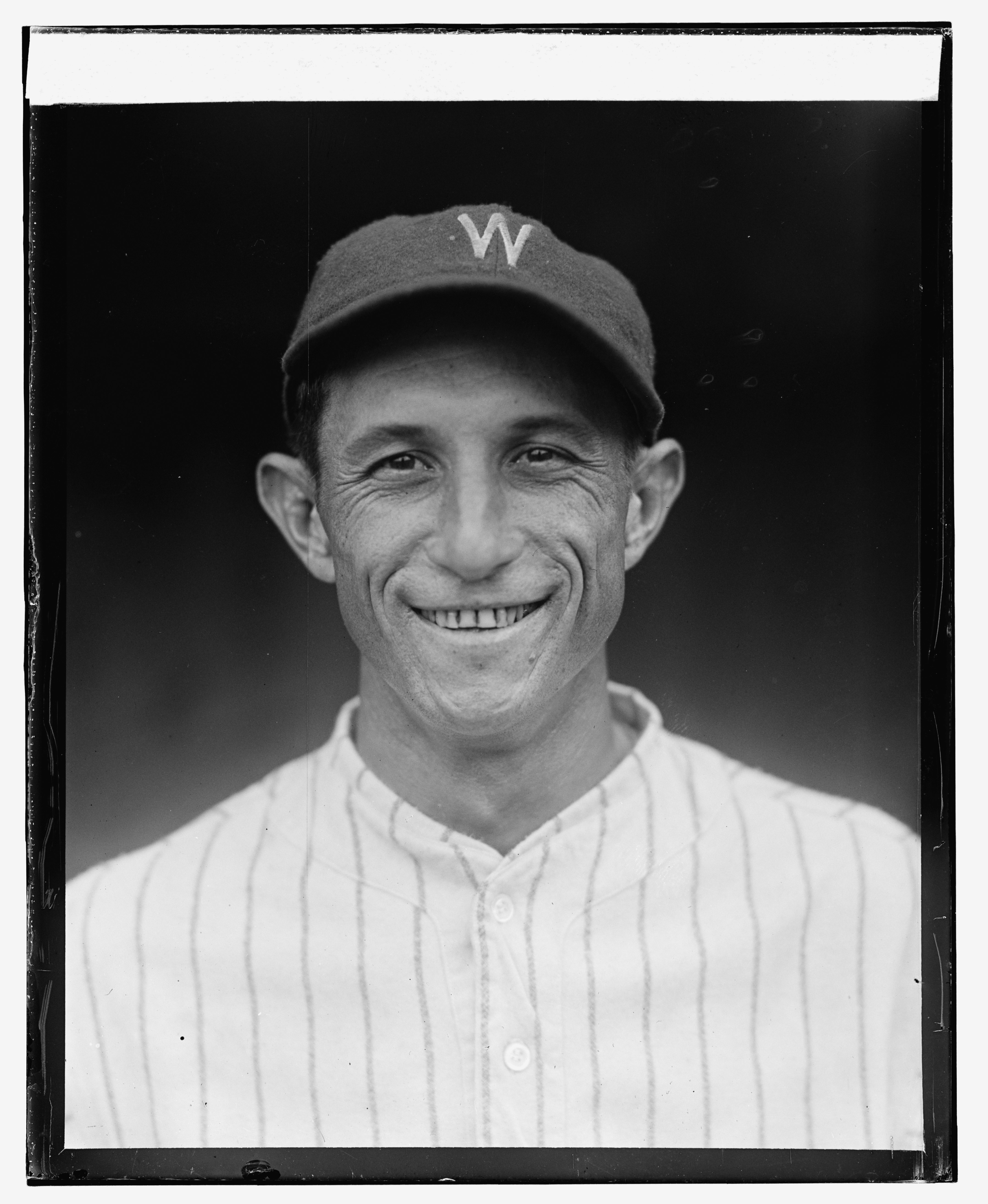
- Second baseman
- Born: January 31, 1894; Jasper, Florida, U.S.
- Died: December 30, 1980 (aged 86); Lake City, Florida, U.S.
- Batted: Right Threw: Right

MLB debut
- September 3, 1916, for the St. Louis Cardinals

Last MLB appearance
- June 29, 1929, for the Washington Senators

MLB statistics
- Batting average: .238
- Home runs: 1
- Runs batted in: 18
- Stats at Baseball Reference

Teams
- St. Louis Cardinals (1916–1917); Pittsburgh Pirates (1922); Brooklyn Robins (1923); Washington Senators (1925–1929)

John Franklin Stewart (January 31, 1894 – December 30, 1980) was an American professional baseball player who played second base from 1916 to 1929.

== Transactions ==
January 21, 1919: Traded by the St. Louis Cardinals with Doug Baird and Gene Packard to the Philadelphia Phillies for Dixie Davis, Pickles Dillhoefer and Milt Stock.

October 15, 1922: Drafted by the Brooklyn Robins from Birmingham (Southern Association) in the 1922 rule 5 draft.

September 14, 1929: Traded by the Washington Senators with Jim Weaver and cash to Baltimore (International) for George Loepp.

At the end of the 1925 season, the Washington Senators brought up from Birmingham a well-seasoned infielder named Stuffy Stewart, who had had several trials with other clubs. He was the greatest base stealer in Southern Association history. He also could field well, but was not very good with the stick. In 1926 he was used 34 times as a pinch runner, scoring 13 runs and stealing six bases. These were probably the top marks for a substitute runner up to that point. Stewart was not exclusively a pinch runner. In 1926 and 1927 he was also used as a late-inning substitute at second base for Manager Bucky Harris. In 1928, Stewart went back to Birmingham where he led the SA for the fifth time in thefts, with 61. He returned to Washington for 22 games in 1929, mostly as a pinch runner, and that was his last stint in the majors.
