= Red Lutz =

American baseball player (1898–1984)

- Catcher
- Born: December 17, 1898; Cincinnati, Ohio, U.S.
- Died: February 22, 1984 (aged 85); Cincinnati, Ohio, U.S.
- Batted: Right Threw: Right

MLB debut
- May 31, 1922, for the Cincinnati Reds

Last MLB appearance
- May 31, 1922, for the Cincinnati Reds

MLB statistics
- Games played: 1
- At bats: 1
- Hits: 1
- Stats at Baseball Reference

Teams
- Cincinnati Reds (1922)

Louis William "Red" Lutz (December 17, 1898 – February 22, 1984) was an American Major League Baseball catcher who played with the Cincinnati Reds in one game on May 31, 1922. He collected one hit, a double, in one at bat.
