= Andy Woehr =

American baseball player (1896–1990)

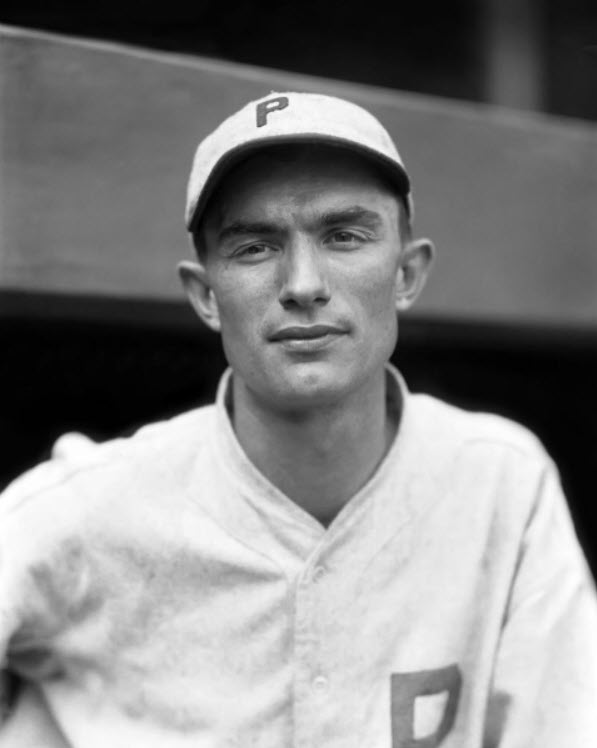
- Third baseman
- Born: February 4, 1896; Fort Wayne, Indiana
- Died: July 24, 1990 (aged 94); Fort Wayne, Indiana
- Batted: Right Threw: Right

MLB debut
- September 15, 1923, for the Philadelphia Phillies

Last MLB appearance
- September 23, 1924, for the Philadelphia Phillies

MLB statistics
- Batting average: .244
- Home runs: 0
- Runs batted in: 20
- Stats at Baseball Reference

Teams
- Philadelphia Phillies (1923–24)

Andrew Emil Woehr (February 4, 1896 – July 24, 1990) was a professional baseball player. He played one full season (1924) and part of another (1923) in Major League Baseball. He played a total of 63 games for the Philadelphia Phillies, primarily as a third baseman.
