= Bunny Roser =

American baseball player (1901-1979)

- Outfielder
- Born: November 15, 1901; St. Louis, Missouri, U.S.
- Died: May 6, 1979 (aged 77); Rocky Hill, Connecticut, U.S.
- Batted: Left Threw: Left

MLB debut
- August 24, 1922, for the Boston Braves

Last MLB appearance
- September 22, 1922, for the Boston Braves

MLB statistics
- Batting average: .239
- Home runs: 0
- Runs batted in: 16
- Stats at Baseball Reference

Teams
- Boston Braves (1922)

John Williams Joseph "Bunny" Roser (November 15, 1901 – May 6, 1979), nicknamed "Jack", was an American professional baseball player. He was an outfielder for one season (1923) with the Boston Braves. For his career, he compiled a .239 batting average in 113 at-bats, with 16 runs batted in.

He was born in St. Louis, Missouri and died in Rocky Hill, Connecticut at the age of 77.
