= Rabbit Benton =

American baseball player (1901–1984)

- Second baseman
- Born: September 29, 1901; Cannel City, Kentucky, U.S.
- Died: June 7, 1984 (aged 82); Mesquite, Texas, U.S.
- Batted: Right Threw: Right

MLB debut
- September 13, 1922, for the Philadelphia Phillies

Last MLB appearance
- September 19, 1922, for the Philadelphia Phillies

MLB statistics
- Games played: 6
- At bats: 19
- Hits: 4
- Stats at Baseball Reference

Teams
- Philadelphia Phillies (1922)

Stanley W. "Rabbit" Benton (September 29, 1901 – June 7, 1984) was an American second baseman whose career lasted 16 seasons and almost 2,000 games—but only six games in Major League Baseball (MLB) for the 1922 Philadelphia Phillies. He batted and threw right-handed, stood 5 feet 7 inches (1.70 m) tall and weighed 150 pounds (68 kg).

Benton's minor league career lasted from 1919 through 1934, largely in the Texas League. In the majors, he had four hits in 19 at bats in his six career games, with one double and three runs batted in.

He died in Mesquite, Texas, at age 82.
