= Bernie Hungling =

American baseball player (1896–1968)

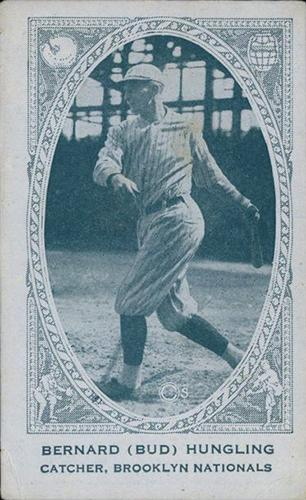
- Catcher
- Born: March 5, 1896; Dayton, Ohio, U.S.
- Died: March 30, 1968 (aged 72); Dayton, Ohio, U.S.
- Batted: Right Threw: Right

MLB debut
- April 14, 1922, for the Brooklyn Robins

Last MLB appearance
- August 11, 1930, for the St. Louis Browns

MLB statistics
- Batting average: .241
- Home runs: 1
- Runs batted in: 15
- Stats at Baseball Reference

Teams
- Brooklyn Robins (1922–1923); St. Louis Browns (1930)

Bernard Herman Hungling [Bud] (March 5, 1896 – March 30, 1968) was an American reserve catcher in Major League Baseball who played between 1922 and 1930 for the Brooklyn Robins (1922–1923) and St. Louis Browns (1930). Listed at 6 ft 2 in (1.88 m), 180 lb., Hungling batted and threw right-handed. He was born in Dayton, Ohio.

In a three-season career, Hungling was a .241 hitter (33-for-137) with one home run and 15 RBI in 51 games, including 13 runs, three doubles, two triples, and two stolen bases.

His minor league career stretched from 1916 through 1932.

Hungling died in his hometown of Dayton, Ohio at age 72.
