= Harry Hulihan =

American baseball player (1899-1980)

- Pitcher
- Born: April 18, 1899; Rutland, Vermont
- Died: September 11, 1980 (aged 81); Rutland, Vermont
- Batted: Right Threw: Left

MLB debut
- August 16, 1922, for the Boston Braves

Last MLB appearance
- September 30, 1922, for the Boston Braves

MLB statistics
- Win–loss record: 2–3
- Strikeouts: 16
- Earned run average: 3.15
- Stats at Baseball Reference

Teams
- Boston Braves (1922)

Harry Joseph Hulihan (April 18, 1899 – September 11, 1980) was a former Major League Baseball pitcher. He played one season with the Boston Braves (1922).
