= Gene Lansing =

American baseball player (1898-1945)

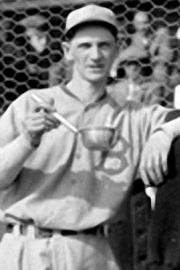
- Pitcher
- Born: January 11, 1898; Albany, New York
- Died: January 18, 1945 (aged 47); Rensselaer, New York
- Batted: Right Threw: Right

MLB debut
- April 27, 1922, for the Boston Braves

Last MLB appearance
- July 17, 1922, for the Boston Braves

MLB statistics
- Win–loss record: 0–1
- Strikeouts: 14
- Earned run average: 5.98
- Stats at Baseball Reference

Teams
- Boston Braves (1922)

Eugene Hewitt "Jigger" Lansing (January 11, 1898 – January 18, 1945) was a former Major League Baseball pitcher. He played one season with the Boston Braves in 1922.
