= Muscadine, Alabama =

Unincorporated community in Alabama, United States

- Unincorporated community
- Interstate 20 rest area in Muscadine

- Location within Alabama Location within the United States
- Coordinates: 33°44′04″N 85°23′10″W
- Country: United States
- State: Alabama
- County: Cleburne
- Elevation: 1,024 ft (312 m)
- Time zone: UTC-6 (Central (CST))
  - Summer (DST): UTC-5 (CDT)
- ZIP code: 36269
- Area codes: 256 & 938
- GNIS feature ID: 152573

Muscadine is an unincorporated community in Cleburne County, Alabama, United States. It is near the Alabama-Georgia state line. Muscadine is 2.75 miles (4.43 km) east of Fruithurst. Muscadine has a post office with ZIP code 36269, a general store, and a bar.

== Demographics ==
Historical population
Census	Pop.	Note	%±
1890	100		—
1900	132		32.0%
1910	130		−1.5%
1920	114		−12.3%
1930	98		−14.0%
U.S. Decennial Census

Muscadine was an incorporated community for a time and was listed on the U.S. Census from 1890 to 1930. It peaked at 132 persons in 1900.
