= Tom Sullivan (1920s pitcher) =

American baseball player

- Pitcher
- Born: October 18, 1895; Boston, Massachusetts, U.S.
- Died: September 23, 1962 (aged 66); Boston, Massachusetts, U.S.
- Batted: Left Threw: Left

MLB debut
- May 15, 1922, for the Philadelphia Phillies

Last MLB appearance
- September 23, 1922, for the Philadelphia Phillies

MLB statistics
- Win–loss record: 0–0
- Earned run average: 11.25
- Strikeouts: 2
- Stats at Baseball Reference

Teams
- Philadelphia Phillies (1922)

Thomas Augustin Sullivan (October 18, 1895 – September 23, 1962) was an American Major League Baseball pitcher who played for the Philadelphia Phillies in 1922.
