= Sycamore, Alabama =

- Unincorporated community
- Location within Alabama Location within the United States
- Coordinates: 33°15′04″N 86°12′09″W
- Country: United States
- State: Alabama
- County: Talladega
- Elevation: 541 ft (165 m)
- Time zone: UTC-6 (Central (CST))
  - Summer (DST): UTC-5 (CDT)
- ZIP code: 35149
- Area code: Area code 256
- GNIS feature ID: 127608

Sycamore is an unincorporated community in Talladega County, Alabama, United States, located near Alabama State Route 21, 6.1 miles (9.8 km) north-northeast of Sylacauga. Sycamore has a post office with ZIP code 35149. Sycamore was originally called Sycamore Grove, and was named for the sycamore trees which grew at the site. The post office was established in 1876.

Robert Russa Moton High School was in Sycamore.

Sycamore was the birthplace of professional baseball player Whitey Glazner.

== Demographics ==
Historical population
Census	Pop.	Note	%±
1930	631		—
U.S. Decennial Census

Incorporated under the name of Sycamore Mills in 1924, it appeared only once on census rolls in 1930. Presumably, it either disincorporated or lost its charter sometimes in the 1930s.
