= Carlton Lord =

American baseball player (1900-1947)

- Third baseman
- Born: January 7, 1900; Philadelphia, Pennsylvania
- Died: August 15, 1947 (aged 47); Chester, Pennsylvania
- Batted: Right Threw: Right

MLB debut
- July 12, 1923, for the Philadelphia Phillies

Last MLB appearance
- September 27, 1923, for the Philadelphia Phillies

MLB statistics
- Batting average: .234
- Home runs: 0
- Runs batted in: 2
- Stats at Baseball Reference

Teams
- Philadelphia Phillies (1923)

William Carlton Lord (January 7, 1900 – August 15, 1947) was a third baseman in Major League Baseball. He played in 17 games for the Philadelphia Phillies, accumulating 11 hits in 47 at bats.

Carlton later worked as a store clerk, and died of an acute hemorrhage on August 15, 1947 at the age of 47.
