= Myrl Brown =

American baseball player (1894–1981)

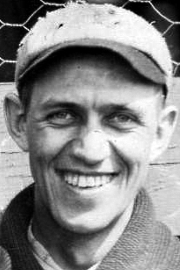
- Pitcher
- Born: October 10, 1894; Waynesboro, Pennsylvania, U.S.
- Died: February 23, 1981 (aged 86); Harrisburg, Pennsylvania, U.S.
- Batted: Right Threw: Right

MLB debut
- August 19, 1922, for the Pittsburgh Pirates

Last MLB appearance
- September 18, 1922, for the Pittsburgh Pirates

MLB statistics
- Win–loss record: 3–1
- Earned run average: 5.97
- Strikeouts: 9
- Stats at Baseball Reference

Teams
- Pittsburgh Pirates (1922)

Myrl Lincoln Brown (October 10, 1894 – February 23, 1981) was an American Major League Baseball pitcher who played with the Pittsburgh Pirates in 1922.

During the 1920 season, the Pirates bought Brown's contract from the Reading Aces of the International League for $20,000 (equivalent to $385,000 in 2025). This was the highest price ever paid for an International League player up to that point.
