= Gil Gallagher =

American baseball player (1896-1957)

- Shortstop
- Born: September 5, 1896; Washington, D.C., U.S.
- Died: January 6, 1957 (aged 60); Washington, D.C., U.S.
- Batted: Both Threw: Right

MLB debut
- September 13, 1922, for the Boston Braves

Last MLB appearance
- October 1, 1922, for the Boston Braves

MLB statistics
- Games played: 7
- At bats: 22
- Hits: 1
- Stats at Baseball Reference

Teams
- Boston Braves (1922)

Lawrence Kirby "Gil" Gallagher (September 5, 1896 – January 6, 1957) was an American shortstop in Major League Baseball. He played for the Boston Braves in 1922.
