= Joe Bennett (baseball) =

American baseball player (1900-1987)

- Third baseman
- Born: July 2, 1900; New York, New York, U.S.
- Died: July 11, 1987 (aged 87); Morro Bay, California, U.S.
- Batted: Right Threw: Right

MLB debut
- July 5, 1923, for the Philadelphia Phillies

Last MLB appearance
- July 5, 1923, for the Philadelphia Phillies

MLB statistics
- Games played: 1
- At bats: 0
- Hits: 0
- Stats at Baseball Reference

Teams
- Philadelphia Phillies (1923)

Joseph Rosenblum Bennett (born Joseph Rosenblum; July 2, 1900 – July 11, 1987) was a Major League Baseball third baseman. Bennett played for the Philadelphia Phillies in the 1923 season. Bennett played in one career game, on July 5, 1923. He batted and threw right-handed. Bennett attended MU and NYU.

Bennett was born in New York, New York and died in Morro Bay, California, and was Jewish.
