= Dink O'Brien =

American baseball player (1894-1971)

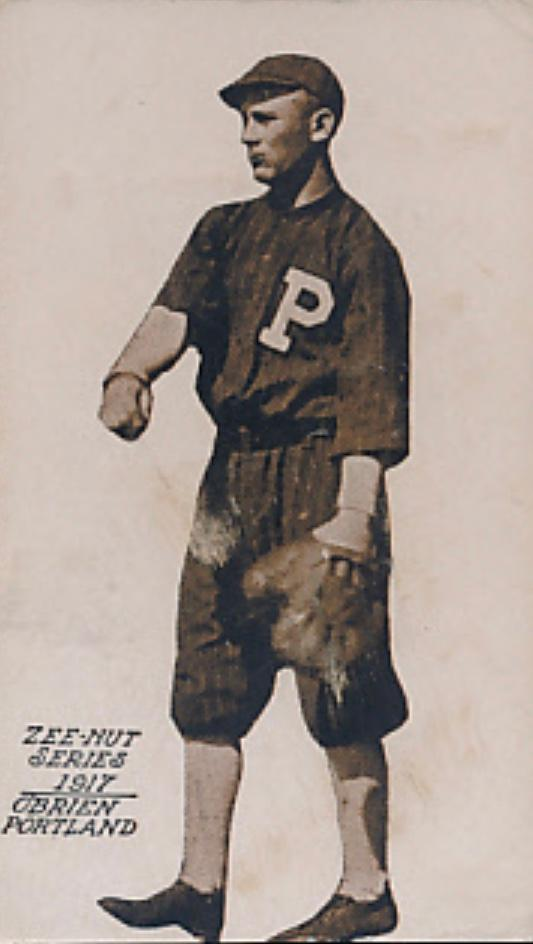
- Catcher
- Born: September 13, 1894; San Francisco, California, U.S.
- Died: November 4, 1971 (aged 77); Monterey Park, California, U.S.
- Batted: Right Threw: Right

MLB debut
- April 26, 1923, for the Philadelphia Phillies

Last MLB appearance
- September 15, 1923, for the Philadelphia Phillies

MLB statistics
- Batting average: .333
- Home runs: 0
- Runs batted in: 0
- Stats at Baseball Reference

Teams
- Philadelphia Phillies (1923)

Frank Aloysius "Dink" O'Brien (September 13, 1894 – November 4, 1971) was an American professional baseball player. He was a catcher for one season (1923) with the Philadelphia Phillies. For his career, he compiled a .333 batting average in 21 at-bats.

O'Brien was born in San Francisco, California and later died in Monterey Park, California at the age of 77.
