= Hal Carlson =

American baseball player (1892–1930)

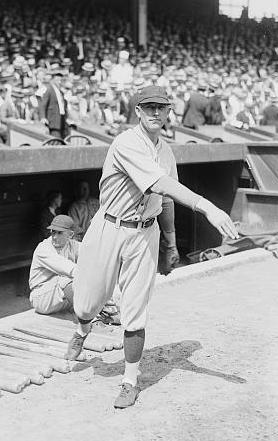
- Pitcher
- Born: May 17, 1892; Rockford, Illinois, U.S.
- Died: May 28, 1930 (aged 38); Chicago, Illinois, U.S.
- Batted: Right Threw: Right

MLB debut
- April 13, 1917, for the Pittsburgh Pirates

Last MLB appearance
- May 23, 1930, for the Chicago Cubs

MLB statistics
- Win–loss record: 114–120
- Earned run average: 3.97
- Strikeouts: 590
- Stats at Baseball Reference

Teams
- Pittsburgh Pirates (1917–1923); Philadelphia Phillies (1924–1927); Chicago Cubs (1927–1930)

Harold Gust Carlson (May 17, 1892 – May 28, 1930) was an American professional baseball pitcher in the Major Leagues from 1917 to 1930, for the Chicago Cubs, Philadelphia Phillies, and Pittsburgh Pirates.

Carlson used his curveball exclusively, owing to his lack of speed. He played seven years for the Pirates, going 42–55, went 42–48 in four years with the Phillies, and had a mark of 30–17 with the Cubs in four years. He had his most wins in 1926, with 17 (along with 12 losses). He had a career best 2.23 ERA in 1919.

He was a strong hitting pitcher in his 14-year major league career, posting a .223 batting average (159-for-712) scoring 58 runs, with 5 home runs and 72 RBI and drawing 24 bases on balls. He had 13 RBI in both 1926 and '27. He was also good fielding his position, recording a .971 fielding percentage which was 12 points higher than the league average at his position.

== Death ==
At 3:00 p.m. on May 28, 1930, Carlson was complaining of stomach pains and called a doctor. Approximately 35 minutes after the team physician was called, Carlson died, just as he was being moved to hospital. He was 38 at the time of his death. According to the physician, Carlson died of a stomach hemorrhage. He left behind a wife and a child. Carlson is buried at Arlington Memorial Park Cemetery in Rockford, Illinois.

== See also ==
- List of baseball players who died during their careers
