= Huck Betts =

American baseball player (1897-1987)

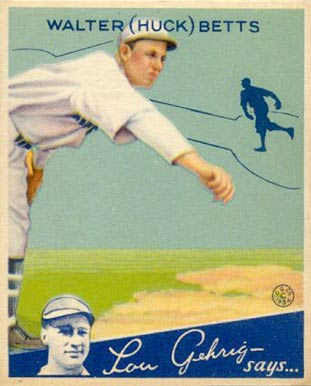
- Huck Betts 1934 Goudey baseball card
- Pitcher
- Born: February 18, 1897; Millsboro, Delaware, U.S.
- Died: June 13, 1987 (aged 90); Millsboro, Delaware, U.S.
- Batted: Right Threw: Right

MLB debut
- April 26, 1920, for the Philadelphia Phillies

Last MLB appearance
- September 27, 1935, for the Boston Braves

MLB statistics
- Win–loss record: 61–68
- Earned run average: 3.93
- Strikeouts: 323
- Stats at Baseball Reference

Teams
- Philadelphia Phillies (1920–1925); Boston Braves (1932–1935)

Walter McKinley "Huck" Betts (February 18, 1897 – June 13, 1987) was an American pitcher for the Philadelphia Phillies (1920–25) and Boston Braves (1932–35).

During his six-year tenure with the Phillies, Betts was an ordinary pitcher at best, compiling 18 wins against 27 losses, and a 4.40 ERA. He spent 1926 in the low minors, and then was out of baseball for the next five years.

Returning to the big leagues in 1932 with the Boston Braves, at the age of 35 Betts unexpectedly became one of the National League's best pitchers. He finished the season 13–11 with a 2.80 ERA, which was the third best ERA in the NL. He also did well in 1933, going 11–11 with a 2.79 ERA, which again put him in the top 10 of pitchers who qualified for the ERA crown. His ERA went up to 4.06 in 1934, but his won–loss record was the best of his career at 17–10.

Betts' career ended the following year, going 2–9 for the woeful 1935 Boston Braves, often identified as one of the worst major league baseball teams of all time.

In 10 seasons Betts had a 61–68 win–loss record, 307 games, 125 games started, 53 complete games, 8 shutouts, 128 games finished, 16 saves, 1,366 1/3 innings pitched, 1,581 hits allowed, 716 runs allowed, 596 earned runs allowed, 83 home runs allowed, 321 walks, 323 strikeouts, and a 3.93 ERA.

Betts threw a fastball, a curveball, and a screwball.

In 1980, Betts was inducted into the Delaware Sports Hall of Fame. He died in his hometown at the age of 90.
