= Goldie Rapp =

American baseball player (1892-1966)

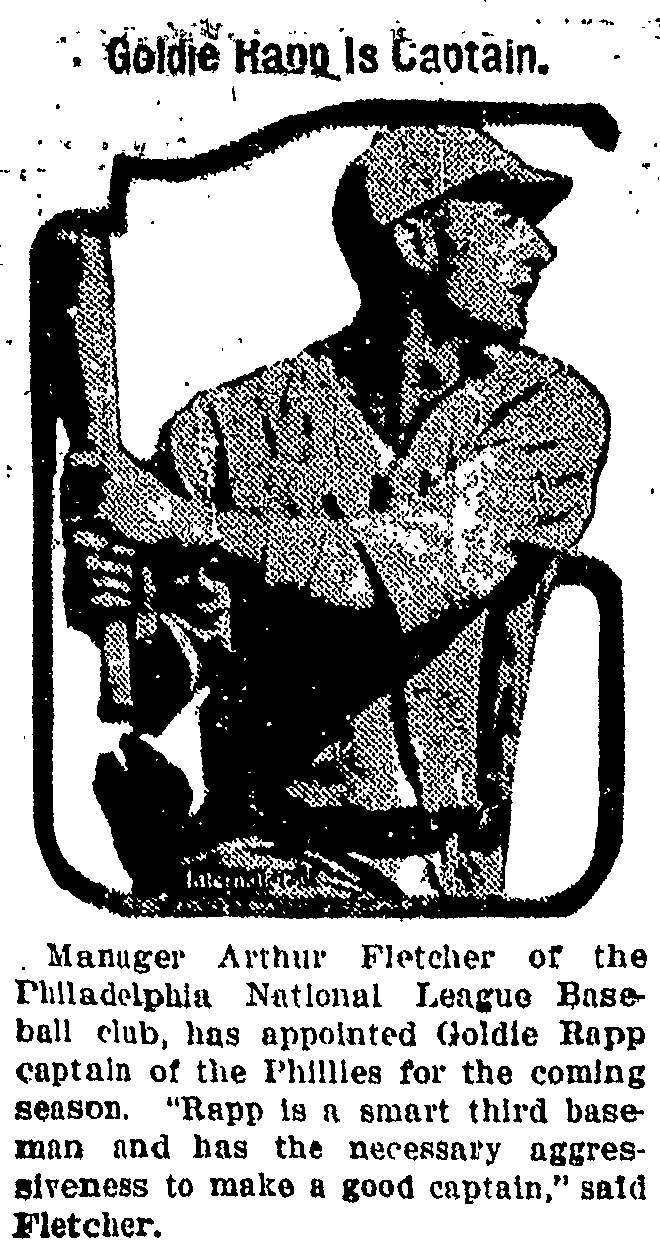
- Third baseman
- Born: February 6, 1892; Cincinnati, Ohio, U.S.
- Died: July 1, 1966 (aged 74); La Mesa, California, U.S.
- Batted: Switch Threw: Right

MLB debut
- April 13, 1921, for the New York Giants

Last MLB appearance
- July 4, 1923, for the Philadelphia Phillies

MLB statistics
- Batting average: .253
- Home runs: 2
- Runs batted in: 73
- Stats at Baseball Reference

Teams
- New York Giants (1921); Philadelphia Phillies (1921–1923)

Joseph Aloysius "Goldie" Rapp (February 6, 1892 - July 1, 1966) was an American professional baseball third baseman. He played in Major League Baseball (MLB) for the New York Giants and Philadelphia Phillies from 1921–1923.

In 276 games over three seasons, Rapp posted a .253 batting average (269-for-1064) with 134 runs, 2 home runs, 73 RBI and 75 bases on balls. He recorded a .945 fielding percentage in the majors.
