= Jim Bishop (baseball) =

American baseball player (1898–1973)

- Pitcher
- Born: January 28, 1898; Montgomery City, Missouri
- Died: September 20, 1973 (aged 75); Montgomery City, Missouri
- Batted: Right Threw: Right

MLB debut
- April 26, 1923, for the Philadelphia Phillies

Last MLB appearance
- September 24, 1924, for the Philadelphia Phillies

MLB statistics
- Win–loss record: 0–4
- ERA: 6.39
- Strikeouts: 8

Teams
- Philadelphia Phillies (1923–1924)

James Morton Bishop (January 28, 1898 – September 20, 1973) was a Major League Baseball pitcher. Bishop played for the Philadelphia Phillies in 1923 and 1924. In 22 career games, he had a 0-4 record with a 6.39 ERA. He batted and threw right-handed.

Bishop was born in and died in Montgomery City, Missouri.
