= Johnny Couch =

American baseball player (1891–1975)

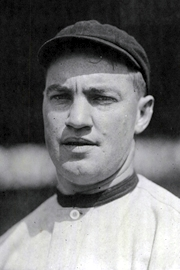
- Pitcher
- Born: March 31, 1891; Vaughn, Montana, US
- Died: December 8, 1975 (aged 84); Palo Alto, California, US
- Batted: Left Threw: Right

MLB debut
- April 11, 1917, for the Detroit Tigers

Last MLB appearance
- September 21, 1925, for the Philadelphia Phillies

MLB statistics
- Win–loss record: 29–34
- Earned run average: 4.63
- Strikeouts: 112
- Stats at Baseball Reference

Teams
- Detroit Tigers (1917); Cincinnati Reds (1922–1923); Philadelphia Phillies (1923–1925)

John Daniel Couch (March 31, 1891 – December 8, 1975) was an American Major League Baseball player.

== Baseball career ==
John Couch began his Major League Baseball career as a pitcher in 1917 with the Detroit Tigers. After the season, he was sent to France, where he served as first lieutenant in the U.S. Army during World War I. Once the war concluded in 1918, Couch returned to California and played three seasons of minor league baseball with the San Francisco Seals from 1919 to 1921. He returned to the Major Leagues in 1922 with the Cincinnati Reds. In 1923 he played part of the season with the Reds and the other part with the Philadelphia Phillies. It was in this season that he pitched 16 wins, the most in his career. The next season, he continued playing with the Phillies until 1925 when he ended his Major League career.

He appeared on Zeenut Series baseball cards for 1916 and 1919.

== Later life ==
Couch later worked for the California Highway Patrol as a motorcycle officer. He retired, remaining in Palo Alto with his wife, the former Miss Zetta Mills. They had one child, Mary Jean Couch.

Couch died on December 8, 1975. He was interred at Alta Mesa Memorial Park.
