= Whitey Glazner =

American baseball player (1893–1989)

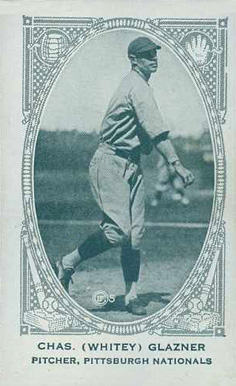
- Pitcher
- Born: September 17, 1893; Sycamore, Alabama, U.S.
- Died: June 6, 1989 (aged 95); Orlando, Florida, U.S.
- Batted: Right Threw: Right

MLB debut
- September 26, 1920, for the Pittsburgh Pirates

Last MLB appearance
- September 24, 1924, for the Philadelphia Phillies

MLB statistics
- Win–loss record: 41–48
- Earned run average: 4.21
- Strikeouts: 266
- Stats at Baseball Reference

Teams
- Pittsburgh Pirates (1920–1923); Philadelphia Phillies (1923–1924)

Charles Franklin "Whitey" Glazner (September 17, 1893 – June 6, 1989) was an American professional baseball player. He was a right-handed pitcher over parts of five seasons (1920–24) with the Pittsburgh Pirates, and Philadelphia Phillies. For his career, he compiled a 41–48 record, with a 4.21 earned run average, and 266 strikeouts in 783 2/3 innings pitched.

He was born in Sycamore, Alabama, and died in Orlando, Florida, at the age of 95.
