= 1925 Cincinnati Reds season =

1925 Cincinnati Reds
- League: National League
- Ballpark: Redland Field
- City: Cincinnati, Ohio
- Owners: Garry Herrmann
- Managers: Jack Hendricks

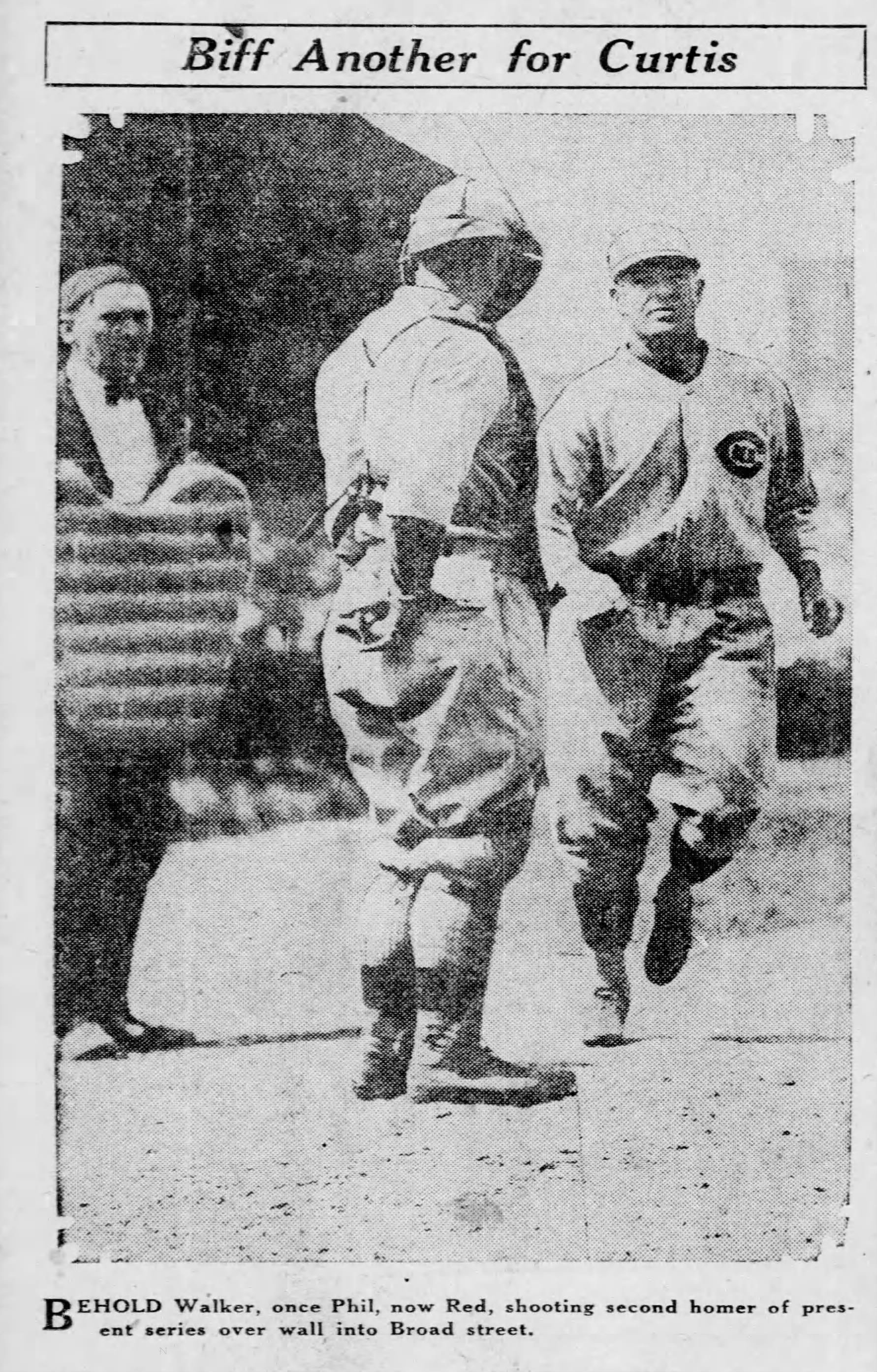
Photo from a 1925 newspaper. Caption text "BEHOLD Walker, once Phil, now Red, street. shooting second homer of present series [vs. Phillies] over wall into Broad street."

The 1925 Cincinnati Reds season was a season in American baseball. The team finished third in the National League with a record of 80–73, 15 games behind the Pittsburgh Pirates.

== Off-season ==
The Reds suffered a devastating loss during the off-season, as late in the 1924 season, first baseman Jake Daubert became ill and he underwent an appendectomy on October 2. Complications from the surgery arose, and Daubert died a week later on October 9. Daubert, who joined Cincinnati in 1919, appeared in 801 games with the Reds, batting .301 with 23 home runs and 307 RBI. In the 1919 World Series, Daubert batted .241 with four runs, a triple and an RBI, helping the club to the championship.

Late in spring training, the Reds lost outfielder George Burns and infielder Lew Fonseca to the Philadelphia Phillies on waivers.

== Regular season ==
Cincinnati had a hot start to the season, as they were tied with the New York Giants for first place with a record of 8-3 in their first 11 games. By the middle of May though, the club went through a lousy stretch of games, and fell into sixth place with a record of 11-14 after 25 games.

At the end of May, the Reds and Pittsburgh Pirates completed a trade, as Cincinnati sent pitcher Tom Sheehan to the Pirates for first baseman Al Niehaus. Niehaus, a 26 year old rookie who was born in Cincinnati, struggled in Pittsburgh, batting .219 with 7 RBI in 17 games.

At the beginning of June, the Reds had an excellent 11-1 stretch, pushing their record up to 30-24, and into third place in the National League, only three games behind the New York Giants for first place. The Reds followed up their hot streak with a bad 21 game slump, winning only five games, and quickly dropped to sixth place with a 35-40 record. During this time, the club picked up first baseman Walter Holke off of waivers from the Philadelphia Phillies. Holke was hitting .244 with a home run and 17 RBI with the Phillies at the time of the transaction.

The Reds continued to be a very streaky team, as they earned a record of 21-6 in their next 27 games, bringing them back into third place, bringing them back to 6.5 games behind the first place Pittsburgh Pirates.

Cincinnati could not keep pace with Pittsburgh though, as the Reds finished the season in third place with a record of 80-73, 15 games behind the pennant winning Pirates. This marked the Reds fourth consecutive season of finishing with a winning record, however, the 80 games won was the club's fewest since winning only 70 in 1921.

Outfielder Edd Roush had another spectacular season, as he led the club with a .339 batting average, eight home runs and 83 RBI. Roush finished in 10th place in National League MVP voting. Outfielder Curt Walker had a solid season, hitting .318 with six home runs and 71 RBI, while catcher Bubbles Hargrave batted .300 with two home runs and 33 RBI.

On the pitching staff, Pete Donohue led the club with a 21-14 record and a 3.08 ERA in a team high 301 innings pitched. Dolf Luque rebounded from a poor 1924 season, as despite a 16-18 record, he led the Reds with a 2.63 ERA, and had a team best 140 strikeouts, while tying for the National League lead with four shutouts. Eppa Rixey had a 21-11 record with 2.88 ERA in 287.1 innings pitched.

=== Season standings ===
National League
Team	W	L	Pct.	GB	Home	Road
Pittsburgh Pirates	95	58	.621	—	52‍–‍25	43‍–‍33
New York Giants	86	66	.566	8½	47‍–‍29	39‍–‍37
Cincinnati Reds	80	73	.523	15	44‍–‍32	36‍–‍41
St. Louis Cardinals	77	76	.503	18	48‍–‍28	29‍–‍48
Boston Braves	70	83	.458	25	37‍–‍39	33‍–‍44
Brooklyn Robins	68	85	.444	27	38‍–‍39	30‍–‍46
Philadelphia Phillies	68	85	.444	27	40‍–‍37	28‍–‍48
Chicago Cubs	68	86	.442	27½	37‍–‍40	31‍–‍46

=== Record vs. opponents ===
1925 National League record Sources:
Team	BSN	BRO	CHC	CIN	NYG	PHI	PIT	STL
Boston	—	13–8	12–10	9–13	11–11	6–16	7–15	12–10
Brooklyn	8–13	—	11–11	12–10	10–12	11–11	5–17	11–11
Chicago	10–12	11–11	—	10–12	7–15	10–12	12–10	8–14
Cincinnati	13–9	10–12	12–10	—	9–13	16–6	8–13	12–10
New York	11–11	12–10	15–7	13–9	—	13–8	10–12	12–9
Philadelphia	16–6	11–11	12–10	6–16	8–13	—	8–14	7–15
Pittsburgh	15–7	17–5	10–12	13–8	12–10	14–8	—	14–8
St. Louis	10–12	11–11	14–8	10–12	9–12	15–7	8–14	—

=== Roster ===
1925 Cincinnati Reds
Roster
Pitchers: Rube Benton; Harry Biemiller; Neal Brady; Pedro Dibut; Pete Donohue; Marv Goodwin; Dolf Luque; Jakie May; Carl Mays; Eppa Rixey; Tom Sheehan	Catchers: Frank Bruggy; Astyanax Douglass; Bubbles Hargrave; Ernie Krueger; Tom Sullivan; Ivey Wingo; Infielders: Sam Bohne; Rube Bressler; Ike Caveney; Hughie Critz; Chuck Dressen; Walter Holke; Jimmy Hudgens; Al Niehaus; Babe Pinelli	Outfielders: Ollie Klee; Hy Myers; Edd Roush; Joe Schultz; Elmer Smith; Curt Walker; Billy Zitzmann; Other batters: Boob Fowler	Manager: Jack Hendricks; Coaches: Grover Land

== Player stats ==
=== Batting ===
==== Starters by position ====
Note: Pos = Position; G = Games played; AB = At bats; H = Hits; Avg. = Batting average; HR = Home runs; RBI = Runs batted in

Pos	Player	G	AB	H	Avg.	HR	RBI
C	Bubbles Hargrave	87	273	82	.300	2	33
1B	Walter Holke	65	232	65	.280	1	20
2B	Hughie Critz	144	541	150	.277	2	51
SS	Ike Caveney	115	358	89	.249	2	47
3B	Babe Pinelli	130	492	139	.283	2	49
OF	Curt Walker	145	509	162	.318	6	71
OF	Edd Roush	134	540	183	.339	8	83
OF	Billy Zitzmann	104	301	76	.252	0	21

==== Other batters ====
Note: G = Games played; AB = At bats; H = Hits; Avg. = Batting average; HR = Home runs; RBI = Runs batted in

Player	G	AB	H	Avg.	HR	RBI
Rube Bressler	97	319	111	.348	4	61
Elmer Smith	96	284	77	.271	8	46
Chuck Dressen	76	215	59	.274	3	19
Sam Bohne	73	214	55	.257	2	24
Al Niehaus	51	147	44	.299	0	14
Ivey Wingo	55	146	30	.205	0	12
Ernie Krueger	37	88	27	.307	1	7
Joe Schultz	33	62	20	.323	0	13
Astyanax Douglass	7	17	3	.176	0	1
Frank Bruggy	6	14	3	.214	0	1
Jimmy Hudgens	3	7	3	.429	0	0
Hy Myers	3	6	1	.167	0	0
Boob Fowler	6	5	2	.400	0	2
Ollie Klee	3	1	0	.000	0	0
Tom Sullivan	1	1	0	.000	0	0

=== Pitching ===
==== Starting pitchers ====
Note: G = Games pitched; IP = Innings pitched; W = Wins; L = Losses; ERA = Earned run average; SO = Strikeouts

Player	G	IP	W	L	ERA	SO
Pete Donohue	42	301.0	21	14	3.08	78
Dolf Luque	36	291.0	16	18	2.63	140
Eppa Rixey	39	287.1	21	11	2.88	69

==== Other pitchers ====
Note: G = Games pitched; IP = Innings pitched; W = Wins; L = Losses; ERA = Earned run average; SO = Strikeouts

Player	G	IP	W	L	ERA	SO
Rube Benton	33	146.2	9	10	4.05	36
Jakie May	36	137.1	8	9	3.87	74
Carl Mays	12	51.2	3	5	3.31	10
Tom Sheehan	10	29.0	1	0	8.07	5
Marv Goodwin	4	20.2	0	2	4.79	4

==== Relief pitchers ====
Note: G = Games pitched; W = Wins; L = Losses; SV = Saves; ERA = Earned run average; SO = Strikeouts

Player	G	W	L	SV	ERA	SO
Harry Biemiller	23	0	1	2	4.02	9
Neal Brady	20	1	3	1	4.66	12
Pedro Dibut	1	0	0	0	inf	0
