= 1925 Chicago Cubs season =

1925 Chicago Cubs
- League: National League
- Ballpark: Cubs Park
- City: Chicago
- Record: 68–86 (.442)
- League place: 8th
- Owners: William Wrigley Jr.
- Managers: Bill Killefer, Rabbit Maranville, George Gibson
- Radio: WGN (Quin Ryan); WMAQ (Hal Totten)

The 1925 Chicago Cubs season was the 54th season of the Chicago Cubs franchise, the 50th in the National League and the tenth at Wrigley Field (then known as "Cubs Park"). The Cubs finished eighth and last in the National League with a record of 68–86.

== Regular season ==
=== Season standings ===
National League
Team	W	L	Pct.	GB	Home	Road
Pittsburgh Pirates	95	58	.621	—	52‍–‍25	43‍–‍33
New York Giants	86	66	.566	8½	47‍–‍29	39‍–‍37
Cincinnati Reds	80	73	.523	15	44‍–‍32	36‍–‍41
St. Louis Cardinals	77	76	.503	18	48‍–‍28	29‍–‍48
Boston Braves	70	83	.458	25	37‍–‍39	33‍–‍44
Brooklyn Robins	68	85	.444	27	38‍–‍39	30‍–‍46
Philadelphia Phillies	68	85	.444	27	40‍–‍37	28‍–‍48
Chicago Cubs	68	86	.442	27½	37‍–‍40	31‍–‍46

=== Record vs. opponents ===
1925 National League record Sources:
Team	BSN	BRO	CHC	CIN	NYG	PHI	PIT	STL
Boston	—	13–8	12–10	9–13	11–11	6–16	7–15	12–10
Brooklyn	8–13	—	11–11	12–10	10–12	11–11	5–17	11–11
Chicago	10–12	11–11	—	10–12	7–15	10–12	12–10	8–14
Cincinnati	13–9	10–12	12–10	—	9–13	16–6	8–13	12–10
New York	11–11	12–10	15–7	13–9	—	13–8	10–12	12–9
Philadelphia	16–6	11–11	12–10	6–16	8–13	—	8–14	7–15
Pittsburgh	15–7	17–5	10–12	13–8	12–10	14–8	—	14–8
St. Louis	10–12	11–11	14–8	10–12	9–12	15–7	8–14	—

=== Roster ===
1925 Chicago Cubs roster
Roster
Pitchers: Pete Alexander; Sheriff Blake; Herb Brett; Jumbo Brown; Guy Bush; Wilbur Cooper; Elmer Jacobs; Percy Jones; Tony Kaufmann; Vic Keen; George Milstead; Bob Osborn; George Stueland	Catchers: John Churry; Mike González; Gabby Hartnett; Bob O'Farrell; Infielders: Sparky Adams; Bob Barrett; Howard Freigau; Bernie Friberg; Charlie Grimm; Teddy Kearns; Rabbit Maranville; Ike McAuley; Ralph Michaels; Pinky Pittenger; Gale Staley	Outfielders: Mandy Brooks; Tommy Griffith; Denver Grigsby; Cliff Heathcote; Art Jahn; Alex Metzler; Hack Miller; Joe Munson; Jigger Statz; Chink Taylor; Butch Weis; Other batters: Mel Kerr	Manager: George Gibson; Bill Killefer; Rabbit Maranville

== Player stats ==
=== Batting ===
==== Starters by position ====
Note: Pos = Position; G = Games played; AB = At bats; H = Hits; Avg. = Batting average; HR = Home runs; RBI = Runs batted in

Pos	Player	G	AB	H	Avg.	HR	RBI
C	Gabby Hartnett	117	398	115	.289	24	67
1B	Charlie Grimm	141	519	159	.306	10	76
2B	Sparky Adams	149	627	180	.287	2	48
SS	Rabbit Maranville	75	266	62	.233	0	23
3B	Howard Freigau	117	476	146	.307	8	71
OF	Cliff Heathcote	109	380	100	.263	5	39
OF	Tommy Griffith	76	235	67	.285	7	27
OF	Mandy Brooks	90	349	98	.281	14	72

==== Other batters ====
Note: G = Games played; AB = At bats; H = Hits; Avg. = Batting average; HR = Home runs; RBI = Runs batted in

Player	G	AB	H	Avg.	HR	RBI
Art Jahn	58	226	68	.301	0	37
Mike González	70	197	52	.264	3	18
Butch Weis	67	180	48	.267	2	25
Pinky Pittenger	59	173	54	.312	0	15
Bernie Friberg	44	152	39	.257	1	16
Jigger Statz	38	148	38	.257	2	14
Denver Grigsby	51	137	35	.255	0	20
Ike McAuley	37	125	35	.280	0	11
Hack Miller	24	86	24	.279	2	9
Ralph Michaels	22	50	14	.280	0	6
Alex Metzler	9	38	7	.184	0	2
Joe Munson	9	35	13	.371	0	3
Bob Barrett	14	32	10	.313	0	7
Gale Staley	7	26	11	.423	0	3
Bob O'Farrell	17	22	4	.182	0	3
John Churry	3	6	3	.500	0	1
Chink Taylor	8	6	0	.000	0	0
Teddy Kearns	3	2	1	.500	0	0
Mel Kerr	1	0	0	----	0	0

=== Pitching ===
==== Starting pitchers ====
Note: G = Games pitched; IP = Innings pitched; W = Wins; L = Losses; ERA = Earned run average; SO = Strikeouts

Player	G	IP	W	L	ERA	SO
Pete Alexander	32	236.0	15	11	3.39	63
Sheriff Blake	36	231.1	10	18	4.86	93
Wilbur Cooper	32	212.1	12	14	4.28	41
Tony Kaufmann	31	196.0	13	13	4.50	49

==== Other pitchers ====
Note: G = Games pitched; IP = Innings pitched; W = Wins; L = Losses; ERA = Earned run average; SO = Strikeouts

Player	G	IP	W	L	ERA	SO
Guy Bush	42	182.0	6	13	4.30	76
Percy Jones	28	124.0	6	6	4.65	60
Vic Keen	30	83.1	2	6	6.26	19
Elmer Jacobs	18	55.2	2	3	5.17	19
George Milstead	5	21.0	1	1	3.00	7

==== Relief pitchers ====
Note: G = Games pitched; W = Wins; L = Losses; SV = Saves; ERA = Earned run average; SO = Strikeouts

Player	G	W	L	SV	ERA	SO
Duke Brett	10	1	1	0	3.63	6
Jumbo Brown	2	0	0	0	3.00	0
George Stueland	2	0	0	0	3.00	2
Bob Osborn	1	0	0	0	0.00	0

== Farm system ==
Level	Team	League	Manager
AA	Los Angeles Angels	Pacific Coast League	Marty Krug
