= Jewel Ens =

American baseball player and manager (1889–1950)

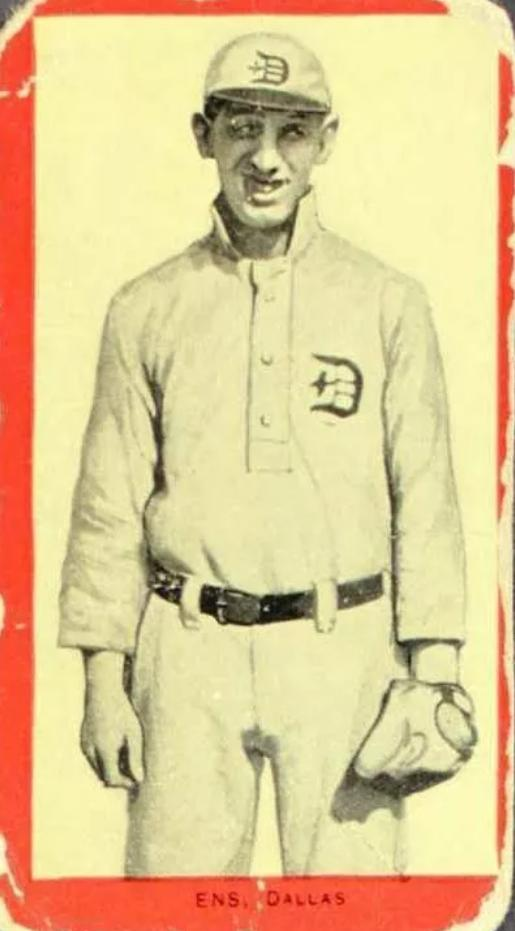
- Infielder / Manager
- Born: August 24, 1889; St. Louis, Missouri, U.S.
- Died: January 17, 1950 (aged 60); Syracuse, New York, U.S.
- Batted: Right Threw: Right

MLB debut
- April 29, 1922, for the Pittsburgh Pirates

Last MLB appearance
- June 15, 1925, for the Pittsburgh Pirates

MLB statistics
- Batting average: .290
- Home runs: 1
- Runs batted in: 24
- Managerial record: 176–167
- Winning percentage: .513
- Stats at Baseball Reference

Teams
- As player: Pittsburgh Pirates (1922–1925); As manager: Pittsburgh Pirates (1929–1931)

Jewel Winklemeyer Ens (August 24, 1889 – January 17, 1950) was an American infielder, manager and coach in Major League Baseball. Born in St. Louis, Missouri, Ens served the Pittsburgh Pirates as a utility infielder (1922–25), player-coach (1923–25), coach (1926–29; 1935–39) and manager (1929–31). He was a member of the 1925 World Series champion Pirates and their 1927 National League championship edition. He managed the Pirates from August 28, 1929, through the end of the 1931 season, leading them to a 176–167 record (.513) with two fifth-place finishes in the eight-team NL during his two full seasons as skipper.

Ens also coached in the Majors for the Detroit Tigers (1932), Cincinnati Reds (1933; 1941) and Boston Braves (1934), and spent eight full seasons (1942–49) as manager of the Syracuse Chiefs, then the Reds' top farm system affiliate.

During his 17-year active career (1908; 1910–25), Ens threw and batted right-handed, stood 5 feet, 10 1/2 inches (1.8 m) tall and weighed 165 pounds (75 kg). After a long career in minor league baseball as a shortstop and third baseman, the native of St. Louis made his National League debut with the Pirates at age 32 in 1922, appearing in a career-high 47 games played. For the next three seasons, he played a total of only 12 games, as he served as an aide to Hall of Fame manager Bill McKechnie. In 59 total big-league games and 186 at bats, Ens registered 54 hits, with eight doubles, four triples and one home run, hit off Wilbur Cooper of the Chicago Cubs on April 15, 1925, and sparking Pittsburgh to an 8–4 win. He drove in two of his career 24 runs batted in that day.

Ens succeeded Donie Bush as manager of the Pirates late in the 1929 season. Pittsburgh was in second place, but 14 1/2 games behind the front-running Cubs, when the change happened. Under Ens, the Pirates won four out of five from the Cubs in a head-to-head series at Forbes Field, trimming three games off Chicago's lead, but they ultimately finished the season as runners-up, 10 1/2 games out, going 21–14 under Ens. During his two full seasons, 1930 and 1931, the Pirates posted 80–74 and 75–79 records, and Ens was replaced by George "Moon" Gibson for the 1932 campaign. In subsequent National League coaching assignments, he again assisted McKechnie in Boston and Cincinnati.

After his coaching days, Ens enjoyed a successful, eight-year run as manager of the Syracuse Chiefs, making the International League playoffs five times and winning three (1942–43; 1947) Governors' Cup championships. He was still the incumbent manager and general manager of the Chiefs when he died at age 60 in Syracuse, from pneumonia, in January 1950. He was elected to the International League Hall of Fame the year of his death.
