= Gale Staley =

American baseball player (1899–1989)

- Second baseman
- Born: May 2, 1899; De Pere, Wisconsin, U.S.
- Died: April 19, 1989 (aged 89); Walnut Creek, California, U.S.
- Batted: Left Threw: Right

MLB debut
- September 16, 1925, for the Chicago Cubs

Last MLB appearance
- October 2, 1925, for the Chicago Cubs

MLB statistics
- Batting average: .423
- Home runs: 0
- Runs batted in: 3
- Stats at Baseball Reference

Teams
- Chicago Cubs (1925)

George Gaylord "Gale" Staley (May 2, 1899 – April 19, 1989) was an American Major League Baseball second baseman. Staley played for the Chicago Cubs in the 1925 season. In 7 career games, he had 11 hits in 26 at-bats. He batted left and threw right-handed.

Staley was born in De Pere, Wisconsin and died in Walnut Creek, California.
