= 1925 New York Giants (MLB) season =

1925 New York Giants
- League: National League
- Ballpark: Polo Grounds
- City: New York City
- Record: 86–66 (.566)
- League place: 2nd
- Owners: Charles Stoneham
- Managers: John McGraw

The 1925 New York Giants season was the franchise's 43rd season. The team finished in second place in the National League with an 86–66 record, 8½ games behind the Pittsburgh Pirates.

== Regular season ==
=== Season standings ===
National League
Team	W	L	Pct.	GB	Home	Road
Pittsburgh Pirates	95	58	.621	—	52‍–‍25	43‍–‍33
New York Giants	86	66	.566	8½	47‍–‍29	39‍–‍37
Cincinnati Reds	80	73	.523	15	44‍–‍32	36‍–‍41
St. Louis Cardinals	77	76	.503	18	48‍–‍28	29‍–‍48
Boston Braves	70	83	.458	25	37‍–‍39	33‍–‍44
Brooklyn Robins	68	85	.444	27	38‍–‍39	30‍–‍46
Philadelphia Phillies	68	85	.444	27	40‍–‍37	28‍–‍48
Chicago Cubs	68	86	.442	27½	37‍–‍40	31‍–‍46

=== Record vs. opponents ===
1925 National League record Sources:
Team	BSN	BRO	CHC	CIN	NYG	PHI	PIT	STL
Boston	—	13–8	12–10	9–13	11–11	6–16	7–15	12–10
Brooklyn	8–13	—	11–11	12–10	10–12	11–11	5–17	11–11
Chicago	10–12	11–11	—	10–12	7–15	10–12	12–10	8–14
Cincinnati	13–9	10–12	12–10	—	9–13	16–6	8–13	12–10
New York	11–11	12–10	15–7	13–9	—	13–8	10–12	12–9
Philadelphia	16–6	11–11	12–10	6–16	8–13	—	8–14	7–15
Pittsburgh	15–7	17–5	10–12	13–8	12–10	14–8	—	14–8
St. Louis	10–12	11–11	14–8	10–12	9–12	15–7	8–14	—

=== Roster ===
1925 New York Giants
Roster
Pitchers: Harry Baldwin; Virgil Barnes; Jack Bentley; Chick Davies; Wayland Dean; Freddie Fitzsimmons; Kent Greenfield; Walt Huntzinger; Hugh McQuillan; Art Nehf; Jack Scott; Jack Wisner	Catchers: Mickey Devine; Hank Gowdy; Grover Hartley; Hugh McMullen; Frank Snyder; Infielders: Doc Farrell; Frankie Frisch; Heinie Groh; Travis Jackson; George Kelly; Freddie Lindstrom; Bill Terry	Outfielders: Blackie Carter; Pip Koehler; Irish Meusel; Al Moore; Billy Southworth; Frank Walker; Hack Wilson; Ross Youngs; Other batters: Earl Webb	Manager: John McGraw; Coaches: Roger Bresnahan; Hughie Jennings

== Player stats ==
=== Batting ===
==== Starters by position ====
Note: Pos = Position; G = Games played; AB = At bats; H = Hits; Avg. = Batting average; HR = Home runs; RBI = Runs batted in

Pos	Player	G	AB	H	Avg.	HR	RBI
C	Frank Snyder	107	325	78	.240	11	51
1B	Bill Terry	133	489	156	.319	11	70
2B	High Pockets Kelly	147	586	181	.309	20	99
SS	Travis Jackson	112	411	117	.285	9	59
3B	Freddie Lindstrom	104	356	102	.287	4	33
OF	Billy Southworth	123	473	138	.292	6	44
OF	Ross Youngs	130	500	132	.264	6	53
OF	Irish Meusel	135	516	169	.328	21	111

==== Other batters ====
Note: G = Games played; AB = At bats; H = Hits; Avg. = Batting average; HR = Home runs; RBI = Runs batted in

Player	G	AB	H	Avg.	HR	RBI
Frankie Frisch	120	502	166	.331	11	48
Hack Wilson	62	180	43	.239	6	30
Hank Gowdy	47	114	37	.325	3	19
Grover Hartley	46	95	30	.316	0	8
Frank Walker	39	81	18	.222	1	5
Heinie Groh	25	65	15	.231	0	4
Doc Farrell	27	56	12	.214	0	4
Mickey Devine	21	33	9	.273	0	4
Hugh McMullen	5	15	2	.133	0	0
Al Moore	2	8	1	.125	0	0
Blackie Carter	1	4	0	.000	0	0
Earl Webb	4	3	0	.000	0	0
Pip Koehler	12	2	0	.000	0	0

=== Pitching ===
==== Starting pitchers ====
Note: G = Games pitched; IP = Innings pitched; W = Wins; L = Losses; ERA = Earned run average; SO = Strikeouts

Player	G	IP	W	L	ERA	SO
Jack Scott	36	239.2	14	15	3.15	87
Virgil Barnes	32	221.2	15	11	3.53	53
Kent Greenfield	29	171.2	12	8	3.88	66
Jack Bentley	28	157.0	11	9	5.04	47
Art Nehf	29	155.0	11	9	3.77	63
Freddie Fitzsimmons	10	74.2	6	3	2.65	17
Hugh McQuillan	14	70.0	2	3	6.04	23

==== Other pitchers ====
Note: G = Games pitched; IP = Innings pitched; W = Wins; L = Losses; ERA = Earned run average; SO = Strikeouts

Player	G	IP	W	L	ERA	SO
Wayland Dean	33	151.1	10	7	4.64	53
Chick Davies	2	7.1	0	0	6.14	5

==== Relief pitchers ====
Note: G = Games pitched; W = Wins; L = Losses; SV = Saves; ERA = Earned run average; SO = Strikeouts

Player	G	W	L	SV	ERA	SO
Jack Wisner	25	0	0	0	3.79	13
Harry Baldwin	1	0	0	0	9.00	0
