= 1925 St. Louis Cardinals season =

Major League Baseball season

1925 St. Louis Cardinals
- League: National League
- Ballpark: Sportsman's Park
- City: St. Louis, Missouri
- Record: 77–76 (.503)
- League place: 4th
- Owners: Sam Breadon
- Managers: Branch Rickey and Rogers Hornsby

The 1925 St. Louis Cardinals season was the team's 44th season in St. Louis, Missouri and the 34th season in the National League. The Cardinals went from 77–76 during the season and finished fourth in the National League.

== Regular season ==
Early in the 1925 season, second baseman Rogers Hornsby was named player-manager of the Cardinals, replacing Branch Rickey, whose professorial style of managing had gone over the heads of most of his players. Immediately after taking over, Hornsby told his fellow players, "Let's cut this baloney and just play ball." They went 64–51 the rest of the way.

The 1925 season also brought Hornsby's second triple crown. He posted a .403 batting average with 39 home runs and 143 RBI. He was named the National League's Most Valuable Player, having barely missed the award in 1924. His .756 slugging percentage that year is the highest in the National League during the 20th century.

=== Season standings ===
National League
Team	W	L	Pct.	GB	Home	Road
Pittsburgh Pirates	95	58	.621	—	52‍–‍25	43‍–‍33
New York Giants	86	66	.566	8½	47‍–‍29	39‍–‍37
Cincinnati Reds	80	73	.523	15	44‍–‍32	36‍–‍41
St. Louis Cardinals	77	76	.503	18	48‍–‍28	29‍–‍48
Boston Braves	70	83	.458	25	37‍–‍39	33‍–‍44
Brooklyn Robins	68	85	.444	27	38‍–‍39	30‍–‍46
Philadelphia Phillies	68	85	.444	27	40‍–‍37	28‍–‍48
Chicago Cubs	68	86	.442	27½	37‍–‍40	31‍–‍46

=== Record vs. opponents ===
1925 National League record Sources:
Team	BSN	BRO	CHC	CIN	NYG	PHI	PIT	STL
Boston	—	13–8	12–10	9–13	11–11	6–16	7–15	12–10
Brooklyn	8–13	—	11–11	12–10	10–12	11–11	5–17	11–11
Chicago	10–12	11–11	—	10–12	7–15	10–12	12–10	8–14
Cincinnati	13–9	10–12	12–10	—	9–13	16–6	8–13	12–10
New York	11–11	12–10	15–7	13–9	—	13–8	10–12	12–9
Philadelphia	16–6	11–11	12–10	6–16	8–13	—	8–14	7–15
Pittsburgh	15–7	17–5	10–12	13–8	12–10	14–8	—	14–8
St. Louis	10–12	11–11	14–8	10–12	9–12	15–7	8–14	—

=== Roster ===
1925 St. Louis Cardinals
Roster
Pitchers: Ed Clough; Pea Ridge Day; Leo Dickerman; Eddie Dyer; Jesse Haines; Bill Hallahan; Duster Mails; Gil Paulsen; Art Reinhart; Flint Rhem; Bill Sherdel; Allen Sothoron; Johnny Stuart	Catchers: Mike González; Bob O'Farrell; Walter Schmidt; Ernie Vick; Bill Warwick; Infielders: Les Bell; Jim Bottomley; Jimmy Cooney; Howard Freigau; Rogers Hornsby; Tommy Thevenow; Specs Toporcer	Outfielders: Ray Blades; Taylor Douthit; Max Flack; Chick Hafey; Wattie Holm; Heinie Mueller; Ralph Shinners; Jack Smith; Other batters: Hy Myers	Manager: Rogers Hornsby; Branch Rickey; Coaches: Burt Shotton; Joe Sugden

== Player stats ==
=== Batting ===
==== Starters by position ====
Note: Pos = Position; G = Games played; AB = At bats; H = Hits; Avg. = Batting average; HR = Home runs; RBI = Runs batted in

Pos	Player	G	AB	H	Avg.	HR	RBI
C	Bob O'Farrell	94	317	88	.278	3	32
1B	Jim Bottomley	153	619	227	.367	21	128
2B	Rogers Hornsby	138	504	203	.403	39	143
SS	Specs Toporcer	83	268	76	.284	2	26
3B	Les Bell	153	586	167	.285	11	88
OF	Ray Blades	122	462	158	.342	12	57
OF	Chick Hafey	93	358	108	.302	5	57
OF	Heinie Mueller	78	243	76	.313	1	26

==== Other batters ====
Note: G = Games played; AB = At bats; H = Hits; Avg. = Batting average; HR = Home runs; RBI = Runs batted in

Player	G	AB	H	Avg.	HR	RBI
Ralph Shinners	74	251	74	.295	7	36
Jack Smith	80	243	61	.251	4	31
Max Flack	79	241	60	.249	0	28
Jimmy Cooney	54	187	51	.273	0	18
Tommy Thevenow	50	175	47	.269	0	17
Walter Schmidt	37	87	22	.253	0	9
Taylor Douthit	30	73	20	.274	1	8
Mike González	22	71	22	.310	0	4
Wattie Holm	13	58	12	.207	0	2
Bill Warwick	13	41	12	.293	1	6
Ernie Vick	14	32	6	.188	0	3
Howard Freigau	9	26	4	.154	0	0
Hy Myers	2	2	1	.500	0	0

=== Pitching ===
==== Starting pitchers ====
Note: G = Games pitched; IP = Innings pitched; W = Wins; L = Losses; ERA = Earned run average; SO = Strikeouts

Player	G	IP	W	L	ERA	SO
Jesse Haines	29	207.0	13	14	4.57	63
Bill Sherdel	32	200.0	15	6	3.11	53
Flint Rhem	30	170.0	8	13	4.92	66
Allan Sothoron	29	155.2	10	10	4.05	67
Art Reinhart	20	144.2	11	5	3.05	26
Duster Mails	21	131.0	7	7	4.60	49

==== Other pitchers ====
Note: G = Games pitched; IP = Innings pitched; W = Wins; L = Losses; ERA = Earned run average; SO = Strikeouts

Player	G	IP	W	L	ERA	SO
Leo Dickerman	29	130.2	4	11	5.58	40
Eddie Dyer	27	81.1	4	3	4.20	25
Pea Ridge Day	17	40.0	2	4	6.30	13
Ed Clough	3	10.0	0	1	8.10	3

==== Relief pitchers ====
Note: G = Games pitched; W = Wins; L = Losses; SV = Saves; ERA = Earned run average; SO = Strikeouts

Player	G	W	L	SV	ERA	SO
Johnny Stuart	15	2	2	0	6.13	14
Bill Hallahan	6	1	0	0	3.52	8
Gil Paulsen	1	0	0	0	0.00	1

== Awards and honors ==
- Rogers Hornsby, Most Valuable Player award

=== League leaders ===
- Rogers Hornsby, National League batting champion

=== Records ===
- Rogers Hornsby, National League record, Best slugging average by a second baseman, (.756).
- Rogers Hornsby, Major league record, Highest batting average in a five-season span (.402 average from 1921 to 1925)

== Farm system ==
Level	Team	League	Manager
AA	Syracuse Stars	International League	Frank Shaughnessy and Harry Myers
A	Houston Buffaloes	Texas League	Marv Goodwin and Pete Compton
C	Fort Smith Twins	Western Association	Carl Mitze
