= 1925 Pittsburgh Pirates season =

Major League Baseball season

1925 Pittsburgh Pirates
- World Series champions National League champions
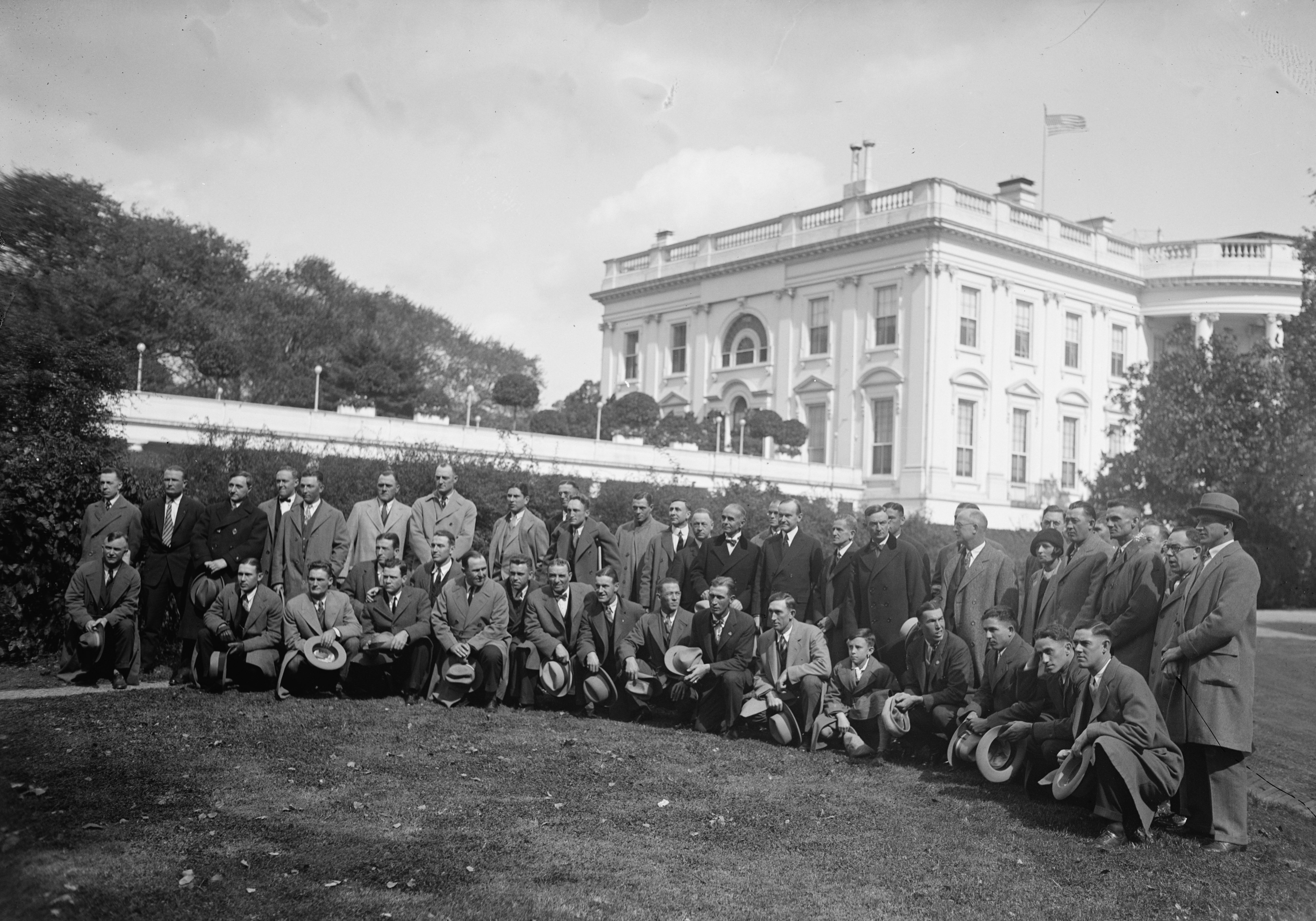
- League: National League
- Ballpark: Forbes Field
- City: Pittsburgh, Pennsylvania
- Owners: Barney Dreyfuss
- Managers: Bill McKechnie

The 1925 Pittsburgh Pirates finished first in the National League with a record of 95–58. They defeated the Washington Senators four games to three to win their second World Series championship.

The Pirates had three future Hall of Famers in their starting lineup: Max Carey, Kiki Cuyler, and Pie Traynor.

Pittsburgh defeated the Brooklyn Robins, 21–5, on June 20 and two days later won 24–6 against the St. Louis Cardinals, becoming the first team since 1901 to score 20 or more runs in consecutive games. This feat was later matched by the 1950 Boston Red Sox.

== Regular season ==
- May 7, 1925: Glenn Wright of the Pirates executed an unassisted triple play. He caught a line drive, touched second base and tagged the runner going back to first base.

=== Season standings ===
National League
Team	W	L	Pct.	GB	Home	Road
Pittsburgh Pirates	95	58	.621	—	52‍–‍25	43‍–‍33
New York Giants	86	66	.566	8½	47‍–‍29	39‍–‍37
Cincinnati Reds	80	73	.523	15	44‍–‍32	36‍–‍41
St. Louis Cardinals	77	76	.503	18	48‍–‍28	29‍–‍48
Boston Braves	70	83	.458	25	37‍–‍39	33‍–‍44
Brooklyn Robins	68	85	.444	27	38‍–‍39	30‍–‍46
Philadelphia Phillies	68	85	.444	27	40‍–‍37	28‍–‍48
Chicago Cubs	68	86	.442	27½	37‍–‍40	31‍–‍46

=== Record vs. opponents ===
1925 National League record Sources:
Team	BSN	BRO	CHC	CIN	NYG	PHI	PIT	STL
Boston	—	13–8	12–10	9–13	11–11	6–16	7–15	12–10
Brooklyn	8–13	—	11–11	12–10	10–12	11–11	5–17	11–11
Chicago	10–12	11–11	—	10–12	7–15	10–12	12–10	8–14
Cincinnati	13–9	10–12	12–10	—	9–13	16–6	8–13	12–10
New York	11–11	12–10	15–7	13–9	—	13–8	10–12	12–9
Philadelphia	16–6	11–11	12–10	6–16	8–13	—	8–14	7–15
Pittsburgh	15–7	17–5	10–12	13–8	12–10	14–8	—	14–8
St. Louis	10–12	11–11	14–8	10–12	9–12	15–7	8–14	—

=== Game log ===
1925 Game Log: 95–58 (Home: 52–25; Away: 43–33)
April: 5–8 (Home: 1–3; Away: 4–5)

#	Date	Opponent	Score	Win	Loss	Save	Attendance	Record
1	April 14	@ Cubs	2–8	Alexander	**Yde** (0–1)	—	38,000	0–1
2	April 15	@ Cubs	8–4	**Meadows** (1–0)	Cooper	**Morrison** (1)	6,500	1–1
3	April 16	@ Cubs	3–8	Blake	**Kremer** (0–1)	—	7,000	1–2
4	April 17	@ Cubs	6–9	Kaufmann	**Morrison** (0–1)	—	—	1–3
5	April 18	@ Reds	2–12	Donohue	**Adams** (0–1)	—	8,500	1–4
6	April 19	@ Reds	2–6	Luque	**Yde** (0–2)	—	25,000	1–5
7	April 20	@ Reds	4–2	**Meadows** (2–0)	Rixey	—	—	2–5
8	April 22	Cubs	6–1	**Morrison** (1–1)	Kaufmann	—	31,000	3–5
9	April 23	Cubs	9–10	Jacobs	**Songer** (0–1)	Blake	7,000	3–6
10	April 24	Cubs	2–7	Alexander	**Yde** (0–3)	—	6,000	3–7
11	April 25	Cubs	3–4	Blake	**Meadows** (2–1)	—	20,000	3–8
12	April 26	@ Cardinals	6–1	**Adams** (1–1)	Haines	—	10,000	4–8
13	April 28	@ Cardinals	7–3	**Morrison** (2–1)	Rhem	—	2,000	5–8

May: 16–9 (Home: 8–1; Away: 8–8)

#	Date	Opponent	Score	Win	Loss	Save	Attendance	Record
14	May 2	Reds	18–3	**Meadows** (3–1)	Donohue	—	19,000	6–8
15	May 3	@ Reds	4–5	Luque	**Morrison** (2–2)	Donohue	—	6–9
16	May 7	Cardinals	9–10	Hallahan	**Adams** (1–2)	Rhem	2,000	6–10
17	May 8	@ Phillies	7–15	Carlson	**Meadows** (3–2)	—	—	6–11
18	May 9	@ Phillies	6–5	**Morrison** (3–2)	Mitchell	**Meadows** (1)	—	7–11
19	May 12	@ Phillies	5–8	Ring	**Aldridge** (0–1)	—	—	7–12
20	May 12	@ Phillies	13–8	**Meadows** (4–2)	Couch	**Adams** (1)	—	8–12
21	May 13	@ Braves	5–4	**Kremer** (1–1)	Genewich	—	5,500	9–12
22	May 14	@ Braves	7–1	**Morrison** (4–2)	Barnes	—	4,000	10–12
23	May 16	@ Braves	7–5 (10)	**Yde** (1–3)	Ryan	—	—	11–12
24	May 17	@ Robins	8–5	**Meadows** (5–2)	Vance	—	27,000	12–12
25	May 18	@ Robins	7–12	Grimes	**Aldridge** (0–2)	—	5,000	12–13
26	May 19	@ Robins	5–9	Ehrhardt	**Morrison** (4–3)	—	12,000	12–14
27	May 20	@ Robins	12–3	**Kremer** (2–1)	Petty	—	5,000	13–14
28	May 21	@ Giants	4–5	Scott	**Morrison** (4–4)	—	6,000	13–15
29	May 22	@ Giants	6–5 (10)	**Aldridge** (1–2)	Dean	—	4,000	14–15
30	May 23	@ Giants	1–10	Greenfield	**Yde** (1–4)	—	30,000	14–16
31	May 25	Cubs	5–3	**Morrison** (5–4)	Bush	—	2,000	15–16
32	May 26	Cubs	7–2	**Kremer** (3–1)	Jones	—	6,000	16–16
33	May 27	Cubs	13–3	**Aldridge** (2–2)	Blake	—	—	17–16
34	May 28	Cardinals	7–4	**Meadows** (6–2)	Haines	—	3,000	18–16
35	May 29	Cardinals	6–5	**Kremer** (4–1)	Dickerman	—	5,000	19–16
36	May 30	Cardinals	4–1	**Yde** (2–4)	Sothoron	—	18,000	20–16
37	May 30	Cardinals	15–5	**Morrison** (6–4)	Day	—	28,000	21–16
38	May 31	@ Cubs	2–11	Blake	**Kremer** (4–2)	—	18,000	21–17

June: 18–8 (Home: 13–5; Away: 5–3)

#	Date	Opponent	Score	Win	Loss	Save	Attendance	Record
39	June 1	@ Cubs	5–6	Bush	**Aldridge** (2–3)	Kaufmann	5,000	21–18
40	June 4	Phillies	16–3	**Meadows** (7–2)	Knight	—	—	22–18
41	June 5	Phillies	5–6 (11)	Mitchell	**Kremer** (4–3)	—	—	22–19
42	June 6	Phillies	9–3	**Yde** (3–4)	Carlson	—	—	23–19
43	June 8	Braves	8–4	**Aldridge** (3–3)	Marquard	—	3,000	24–19
44	June 9	Braves	4–7 (11)	Barnes	**Meadows** (7–3)	—	—	24–20
45	June 10	Braves	4–6	Graham	**Morrison** (6–5)	—	—	24–21
46	June 11	Braves	11–3	**Yde** (4–4)	Ryan	—	—	25–21
47	June 12	Giants	6–2	**Aldridge** (4–3)	Barnes	—	16,000	26–21
48	June 13	Giants	6–4	**Meadows** (8–3)	McQuillan	—	28,000	27–21
49	June 15	Giants	7–6	**Adams** (2–2)	Scott	—	18,000	28–21
50	June 16	Giants	13–11 (10)	**Meadows** (9–3)	Nehf	—	21,000	29–21
51	June 17	Robins	8–3	**Yde** (5–4)	Grimes	—	—	30–21
52	June 18	Robins	2–6	Vance	**Kremer** (4–4)	—	—	30–22
53	June 19	Robins	9–6	**Meadows** (10–3)	Ehrhardt	—	6,000	31–22
54	June 20	Robins	21–5	**Adams** (3–2)	Petty	—	20,000	32–22
55	June 22	@ Cardinals	24–6	**Kremer** (5–4)	Rhem	—	4,500	33–22
56	June 24	@ Cardinals	3–11	Haines	**Yde** (5–5)	—	8,000	33–23
57	June 24	@ Cardinals	7–6	**Morrison** (7–5)	Sherdel	**Adams** (2)	12,000	34–23
58	June 25	@ Cardinals	4–3	**Meadows** (11–3)	Dickerman	—	3,500	35–23
59	June 26	Reds	5–3	**Kremer** (6–4)	May	—	—	36–23
60	June 27	Reds	3–2	**Adams** (4–2)	Luque	—	36,000	37–23
61	June 27	Reds	2–6	Donohue	**Aldridge** (4–4)	—	35,353	37–24
62	June 28	@ Reds	5–2	**Yde** (6–5)	Benton	—	35,353	38–24
63	June 29	@ Reds	8–1	**Morrison** (8–5)	Rixey	—	1,800	39–24
64	June 30	@ Cubs	0–1	Kaufmann	**Meadows** (11–4)	—	5,000	39–25

July: 17–11 (Home: 8–3; Away: 9–8)

#	Date	Opponent	Score	Win	Loss	Save	Attendance	Record
65	July 1	@ Cubs	8–6	**Kremer** (7–4)	Alexander	—	3,000	40–25
66	July 2	Reds	2–1	**Sheehan** (1–0)	Luque	—	—	41–25
67	July 3	Reds	0–8	Donohue	**Adams** (4–3)	—	—	41–26
68	July 4	Reds	7–5	**Yde** (7–5)	Biemiller	—	22,000	42–26
69	July 4	Reds	7–1	**Meadows** (12–4)	Rixey	—	25,000	43–26
70	July 5	@ Cubs	3–2	**Kremer** (8–4)	Bush	**Morrison** (2)	25,000	44–26
71	July 7	@ Giants	6–7	Greenfield	**Sheehan** (1–1)	Nehf	8,000	44–27
72	July 9	@ Giants	12–3	**Yde** (8–5)	Scott	—	—	45–27
73	July 9	@ Giants	5–7	Dean	**Morrison** (8–6)	—	40,000	45–28
74	July 11	@ Robins	7–6	**Meadows** (13–4)	Grimes	—	15,000	46–28
75	July 12	@ Robins	3–4	Osborne	**Kremer** (8–5)	—	15,000	46–29
76	July 13	@ Robins	4–2	**Aldridge** (5–4)	Hubbell	—	—	47–29
77	July 14	@ Robins	8–5	**Yde** (9–5)	Vance	—	—	48–29
78	July 15	@ Braves	3–4	Benton	**Morrison** (8–7)	—	4,000	48–30
79	July 16	@ Braves	8–9 (10)	Genewich	**Kremer** (8–6)	—	3,500	48–31
80	July 17	@ Braves	7–3 (10)	**Adams** (5–3)	Graham	—	3,500	49–31
81	July 18	@ Braves	9–8	**Yde** (10–5)	Cooney	**Kremer** (1)	—	50–31
82	July 18	@ Braves	1–2 (11)	Smith	**Morrison** (8–8)	—	—	50–32
83	July 20	@ Phillies	3–6	Ring	**Meadows** (13–5)	—	—	50–33
84	July 21	@ Phillies	2–4	Mitchell	**Kremer** (8–7)	—	1,000	50–34
85	July 23	Cardinals	3–2	**Yde** (11–5)	Haines	—	7,000	51–34
86	July 24	Cardinals	5–3	**Morrison** (9–8)	Rhem	—	8,000	52–34
87	July 25	Cardinals	2–7	Mails	**Adams** (5–4)	—	11,000	52–35
88	July 26	@ Cubs	6–4	**Aldridge** (6–4)	Kaufmann	—	22,000	53–35
89	July 27	Braves	6–5 (10)	**Morrison** (10–8)	Barnes	—	5,000	54–35
90	July 28	Braves	5–1	**Meadows** (14–5)	Benton	—	—	55–35
91	July 29	Braves	8–6	**Yde** (12–5)	Cooney	**Morrison** (3)	—	56–35
92	July 30	Braves	1–5	Genewich	**Aldridge** (6–5)	—	—	56–36

August: 21–10 (Home: 9–6; Away: 12–4)

#	Date	Opponent	Score	Win	Loss	Save	Attendance	Record
93	August 1	Phillies	2–3	Decatur	**Morrison** (10–9)	—	—	56–37
94	August 1	Phillies	2–4	Ring	**Meadows** (14–6)	—	25,000	56–38
95	August 3	Phillies	3–2	**Yde** (13–5)	Carlson	**Adams** (3)	—	57–38
96	August 3	Phillies	3–2 (11)	**Aldridge** (7–5)	Couch	—	—	58–38
97	August 4	Phillies	4–8	Mitchell	**Morrison** (10–10)	—	—	58–39
98	August 6	Robins	5–1	**Kremer** (9–7)	Vance	—	11,000	59–39
99	August 7	Robins	10–9	**Morrison** (11–10)	Ehrhardt	—	7,000	60–39
100	August 8	Robins	12–8	**Morrison** (12–10)	Oeschger	—	—	61–39
101	August 8	Robins	5–4	**Adams** (6–4)	Ehrhardt	—	35,000	62–39
102	August 10	Giants	1–2	Scott	**Meadows** (14–7)	—	20,000	62–40
103	August 11	Giants	7–4	**Morrison** (13–10)	Dean	—	22,000	63–40
104	August 12	Giants	5–3	**Yde** (14–5)	Barnes	—	22,000	64–40
105	August 13	Giants	1–4	Greenfield	**Aldridge** (7–6)	—	24,000	64–41
106	August 14	Reds	14–6	**Meadows** (15–7)	Luque	—	6,500	65–41
107	August 15	Reds	1–8	Donohue	**Kremer** (9–8)	—	20,000	65–42
108	August 16	@ Reds	1–6	Rixey	**Morrison** (13–11)	—	15,000	65–43
109	August 18	@ Robins	11–4	**Aldridge** (8–6)	Osborne	—	—	66–43
110	August 19	@ Robins	7–8	Vance	**Meadows** (15–8)	—	5,000	66–44
111	August 20	@ Robins	2–1	**Kremer** (10–8)	Grimes	—	5,000	67–44
112	August 22	@ Giants	8–1	**Meadows** (16–8)	Barnes	—	51,200	68–44
113	August 22	@ Giants	2–1	**Aldridge** (9–6)	Scott	—	55,000	69–44
114	August 23	@ Giants	4–7	Greenfield	**Adams** (6–5)	Scott	—	69–45
115	August 23	@ Giants	3–2	**Morrison** (14–11)	Fitzsimmons	**Oldham** (1)	53,000	70–45
116	August 24	@ Giants	9–2	**Kremer** (11–8)	Dean	—	25,000	71–45
117	August 25	@ Braves	1–2	Barnes	**Yde** (14–6)	—	10,000	71–46
118	August 26	@ Braves	2–0	**Meadows** (17–8)	Smith	—	—	72–46
119	August 27	@ Braves	1–0	**Aldridge** (10–6)	Benton	—	—	73–46
120	August 28	@ Phillies	10–9	**Oldham** (1–0)	Ring	**Kremer** (2)	5,000	74–46
121	August 29	@ Phillies	11–2	**Yde** (15–6)	Decatur	—	—	75–46
122	August 29	@ Phillies	13–1	**Kremer** (12–8)	Couch	—	18,000	76–46
123	August 31	@ Phillies	10–3	**Meadows** (18–8)	Knight	—	5,000	77–46

September: 17–11 (Home: 13–7; Away: 4–4)

#	Date	Opponent	Score	Win	Loss	Save	Attendance	Record
124	September 1	@ Phillies	10–3	**Aldridge** (11–6)	Carlson	—	2,000	78–46
125	September 2	Reds	8–2	**Morrison** (15–11)	Donohue	—	8,000	79–46
126	September 3	Cardinals	5–2	**Kremer** (13–8)	Sherdel	—	—	80–46
127	September 4	Cardinals	3–9	Reinhart	**Yde** (15–7)	—	—	80–47
128	September 5	Cardinals	6–5	**Morrison** (16–11)	Dyer	—	—	81–47
129	September 6	@ Cubs	9–2	**Aldridge** (12–6)	Blake	—	18,000	82–47
130	September 7	Cubs	8–5	**Oldham** (2–0)	Cooper	—	17,000	83–47
131	September 7	Cubs	8–9 (10)	Bush	**Meadows** (18–9)	Kaufmann	27,000	83–48
132	September 8	Cubs	2–3	Alexander	**Yde** (15–8)	—	—	83–49
133	September 9	Cubs	7–9 (11)	Kaufmann	**Morrison** (16–12)	—	—	83–50
134	September 10	@ Cardinals	9–5	**Aldridge** (13–6)	Sothoron	**Sheehan** (1)	—	84–50
135	September 11	@ Cardinals	3–5	Haines	**Oldham** (2–1)	—	—	84–51
136	September 12	@ Cardinals	0–4	Sherdel	**Meadows** (18–10)	—	—	84–52
137	September 13	@ Cardinals	4–8	Mails	**Yde** (15–9)	—	—	84–53
138	September 13	@ Cardinals	2–6 (5)	Reinhart	**Morrison** (16–13)	—	—	84–54
139	September 14	Robins	9–4	**Aldridge** (14–6)	Ehrhardt	—	4,500	85–54
140	September 16	Robins	5–3	**Meadows** (19–10)	Elliott	—	—	86–54
141	September 16	Robins	6–2	**Oldham** (3–1)	Osborne	—	10,000	87–54
142	September 17	Braves	11–2	**Kremer** (14–8)	Smith	—	—	88–54
143	September 18	Braves	9–7	**Yde** (16–9)	Graham	—	—	89–54
144	September 19	Braves	2–1	**Aldridge** (15–6)	Barnes	—	11,000	90–54
145	September 21	Phillies	9–7	**Morrison** (17–13)	Decatur	—	—	91–54
146	September 22	Phillies	14–4	**Kremer** (15–8)	Ring	—	—	92–54
147	September 23	Phillies	2–1	**Yde** (17–9)	Willoughby	**Sheehan** (2)	2,000	93–54
148	September 24	Giants	0–4	Scott	**Oldham** (3–2)	—	12,000	93–55
149	September 26	Giants	3–4	Barnes	**Aldridge** (15–7)	—	—	93–56
150	September 26	Giants	0–3	Fitzsimmons	**Morrison** (17–14)	—	18,000	93–57
151	September 27	@ Reds	4–3 (5)	**Kremer** (16–8)	Luque	—	—	94–57

October: 1–1 (Home: 0–0; Away: 1–1)

#	Date	Opponent	Score	Win	Loss	Save	Attendance	Record
152	October 4	@ Reds	4–2	**Kremer** (17–8)	Goodwin	**Morrison** (4)	—	95–57
153	October 4	@ Reds	1–4	Donohue	**Culloton** (0–1)	—	—	95–58

Legend: = Win = Loss
Bold = Pirates team member

=== Roster ===
1925 Pittsburgh Pirates
**Roster**
**Pitchers**: Babe Adams; Vic Aldridge; Bud Culloton; Lou Koupal; Ray Kremer; Lee Meadows; Johnny Morrison; Red Oldham; Tom Sheehan; Don Songer; Emil Yde	**Catchers**: Johnny Gooch; Earl Smith; Roy Spencer; **Infielders**: Jewel Ens; George Grantham; Stuffy McInnis; Eddie Moore; Al Niehaus; Johnny Rawlings; Fresco Thompson; Pie Traynor; Glenn Wright	**Outfielders**: Clyde Barnhart; Carson Bigbee; Max Carey; Kiki Cuyler; Mule Haas	**Manager**: Bill McKechnie; **Coaches**: Jack Onslow

== Player stats ==
=== Batting ===
==== Starters by position ====
Note: Pos = Position; G = Games played; AB = At bats; H = Hits; Avg. = Batting average; HR = Home runs; RBI = Runs batted in

Pos	Player	G	AB	H	Avg.	HR	RBI
C	Earl Smith	109	329	103	.313	8	64
1B	George Grantham	114	359	117	.326	8	52
2B	Eddie Moore	142	547	163	.298	6	77
3B	Pie Traynor	150	591	189	.320	6	106
SS	Glenn Wright	153	614	189	.308	18	121
OF	Max Carey	133	542	186	.343	5	44
OF	Kiki Cuyler	153	617	220	.357	18	102
OF	Clyde Barnhart	142	539	175	.325	4	114

==== Other batters ====
Note: G = Games played; AB = At bats; H = Hits; Avg. = Batting average; HR = Home runs; RBI = Runs batted in

Player	G	AB	H	Avg.	HR	RBI
Johnny Gooch	79	215	64	.298	0	30
Stuffy McInnis	59	155	57	.368	0	24
Carson Bigbee	66	126	30	.238	0	8
Johnny Rawlings	36	110	31	.282	2	13
Al Niehaus	17	64	14	.219	0	7
Fresco Thompson	14	37	9	.243	0	8
Roy Spencer	14	28	6	.214	0	2
Jewel Ens	3	5	1	.200	1	2
Mule Haas	4	3	0	.000	0	0

=== Pitching ===
==== Starting pitchers ====
Note: G = Games pitched; IP = Innings pitched; W = Wins; L = Losses; ERA = Earned run average; SO = Strikeouts

Player	G	IP	W	L	ERA	SO
Lee Meadows	35	255.1	19	10	3.67	87
Ray Kremer	40	214.2	17	8	3.63	62
Vic Aldridge	30	213.1	15	7	3.63	88
Johnny Morrison	44	211.0	17	14	3.88	60
Emil Yde	33	207.0	17	9	4.13	41

==== Other pitchers ====
Note: G = Games pitched; IP = Innings pitched; W = Wins; L = Losses; ERA = Earned run average; SO = Strikeouts

Player	G	IP	W	L	ERA	SO
Babe Adams	33	101.1	6	5	5.42	18
Red Oldham	11	53.0	3	2	3.91	10
Bud Culloton	9	21.0	0	1	2.57	3

==== Relief pitchers ====
Note: G = Games pitched; IP = Innings pitched; W = Wins; L = Losses; ERA = Earned run average; SO = Strikeouts

Player	G	W	L	SV	ERA	SO
Tom Sheehan	23	1	1	2	2.67	13
Don Songer	8	0	1	0	2.31	4
Lou Koupal	6	0	0	0	9.00	0

== 1925 World Series ==
=== Game 1 ===
October 7, 1925, at Forbes Field in Pittsburgh, Pennsylvania

Team	1	2	3	4	5	6	7	8	9	R	H	E
Washington	0	1	0	0	2	0	0	0	1	4	8	1
Pittsburgh	0	0	0	0	1	0	0	0	0	1	5	0
W: Walter Johnson (1–0) L: Lee Meadows (0–1)
HR: WAS – Joe Harris (1), PIT – Pie Traynor (1)

=== Game 2 ===
October 8, 1925, at Forbes Field in Pittsburgh, Pennsylvania

Team	1	2	3	4	5	6	7	8	9	R	H	E
Washington	0	1	0	0	0	0	0	0	1	2	8	2
Pittsburgh	0	0	0	1	0	0	0	2	x	3	7	0
W: Vic Aldridge (1–0) L: Stan Coveleski (0–1)
HR: WAS – Joe Judge (1), PIT – Glenn Wright (1), Kiki Cuyler (1)

=== Game 3 ===
October 10, 1925, at Griffith Stadium in Washington, D.C.

Team	1	2	3	4	5	6	7	8	9	R	H	E
Pittsburgh	0	1	0	1	0	1	0	0	0	3	8	2
Washington	0	0	1	0	0	1	2	0	x	4	10	1
W: Alex Ferguson (1–0) L: Ray Kremer (0–1) S: Firpo Marberry (1)
HR: WAS – Goose Goslin (1)

=== Game 4 ===
October 11, 1925, at Griffith Stadium in Washington, D.C.

Team	1	2	3	4	5	6	7	8	9	R	H	E
Pittsburgh	0	0	0	0	0	0	0	0	0	0	6	1
Washington	0	0	4	0	0	0	0	0	x	4	12	0
W: Walter Johnson (2–0) L: Emil Yde (0–1)
HR: WAS – Goose Goslin (2), Joe Harris (2)

=== Game 5 ===
October 12, 1925, at Griffith Stadium in Washington, D.C.

Team	1	2	3	4	5	6	7	8	9	R	H	E
Pittsburgh	0	0	2	0	0	0	2	1	1	6	13	0
Washington	1	0	0	1	0	0	1	0	0	3	8	1
W: Vic Aldridge (2–0) L: Stan Coveleski (0–2)
HR: WAS – Joe Harris (3)

=== Game 6 ===
October 13, 1925, at Forbes Field in Pittsburgh, Pennsylvania

Team	1	2	3	4	5	6	7	8	9	R	H	E
Washington	1	1	0	0	0	0	0	0	0	2	6	2
Pittsburgh	0	0	2	0	1	0	0	0	x	3	7	1
W: Ray Kremer (1–1) L: Alex Ferguson (1–1)
HR: WAS – Goose Goslin (3), PIT – Eddie Moore (1)

=== Game 7 ===
October 15, 1925, at Forbes Field in Pittsburgh, Pennsylvania

Team	1	2	3	4	5	6	7	8	9	R	H	E
Washington	4	0	0	2	0	0	0	1	0	7	7	2
Pittsburgh	0	0	3	0	1	0	2	3	x	9	15	3
W: Ray Kremer (2–1) L: Walter Johnson (2–1), S: Red Oldham (1)
HR: WAS – Roger Peckinpaugh (1)

== Awards and records ==
=== League leaders ===
- Kiki Cuyler, National League leader, triples (26)

== Farm system ==
Level	Team	League	Manager
C	Johnstown Johnnies	Middle Atlantic League	Norm McNeill

LEAGUE CHAMPIONS: Johnstown
