= Ollie Klee =

American baseball player (1900–1977)

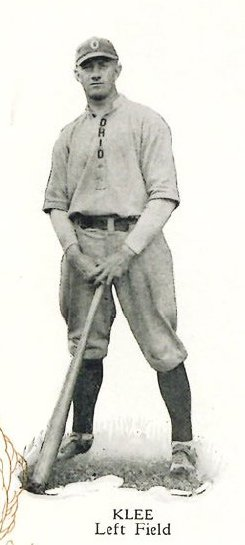
- Outfielder
- Born: May 20, 1900; Piqua, Ohio
- Died: February 9, 1977 (aged 76); Toledo, Ohio
- Batted: Left Threw: Left

MLB debut
- August 10, 1925, for the Cincinnati Reds

Last MLB appearance
- August 26, 1925, for the Cincinnati Reds

MLB statistics
- Games played: 3
- At bats: 1
- Hits: 0
- Stats at Baseball Reference

Teams
- Cincinnati Reds (1925)

Ollie Chester Klee (May 20, 1900 – February 9, 1977) was an outfielder in Major League Baseball. Nicknamed "Babe", he played for the Cincinnati Reds.

Klee attended Ohio University circa 1922–1924, but was known as a star football player. He was an honorable mention for All-American halfback in 1924. He also played some baseball at university.
