= Lenny Metz =

American baseball player (1899-1953)

- Shortstop
- Born: July 6, 1899; Superior, Colorado
- Died: February 24, 1953 (aged 53); Denver, Colorado
- Batted: Right Threw: Right

MLB debut
- September 11, 1923, for the Philadelphia Phillies

Last MLB appearance
- September 27, 1925, for the Philadelphia Phillies

MLB statistics
- Games played: 30
- Batting average: .172
- Runs batted in: 4
- Stats at Baseball Reference

Teams
- Philadelphia Phillies (1923–1925)

Leonard Ray "Lenny" Metz (July 6, 1899 – February 24, 1953) was a Major League Baseball shortstop who played for the Philadelphia Phillies from 1923 to 1925.
