= Gil Paulsen =

American baseball player (1902–1994)

- Pitcher
- Born: November 14, 1902; Graettinger, Iowa, U.S.
- Died: April 2, 1994 (aged 91); Harlan, Iowa, U.S.
- Batted: Right Threw: Right

MLB debut
- October 3, 1925, for the St. Louis Cardinals

Last MLB appearance
- October 3, 1925, for the St. Louis Cardinals

MLB statistics
- Win–loss record: 1
- Innings pitched: 2
- Earned run average: 0.00
- Stats at Baseball Reference

Teams
- St. Louis Cardinals (1925)

Guilford Paul Hans Paulsen (November 14, 1902 – April 2, 1994) was an American pitcher in Major League Baseball. He played one game for the St. Louis Cardinals in 1925.
