= Bud Culloton =

American baseball player (1896–1976)

- Pitcher
- Born: May 19, 1896; Kingston, New York, U.S.
- Died: November 9, 1976 (aged 80); Kingston, New York, U.S.
- Batted: Right Threw: Right

MLB debut
- April 16, 1925, for the Pittsburgh Pirates

Last MLB appearance
- June 11, 1926, for the Pittsburgh Pirates

MLB statistics
- Win–loss record: 0–1
- Earned run average: 3.28
- Strikeouts: 4
- Stats at Baseball Reference

Teams
- Pittsburgh Pirates (1925–1926)

Bernard Aloysius "Bud" Culloton (May 19, 1896 – November 9, 1976) was an American pitcher in Major League Baseball. He played for the Pittsburgh Pirates.

Culloton grew up in Kingston, New York, where he attended Ulster Academy before enrolling at Columbia University and playing freshman football for the Lions. After his education was interrupted by his service in World War I, he returned to New York to attended Fordham University. While he was playing for the Fordham Rams baseball team, it was revealed that he had lost his amateur status by playing for the minor league Kingston Colonials. After graduating from Fordham in 1923, he signed with the Pirates and saw regular action in the 1925 and 1926 seasons. After being traded to the minor league New Haven Profs in 1926, Culloton quit baseball and enrolled at the Fordham School of Law.

After returning to Kingston, he worked as an attorney and was eventually elected a judge in the city court, similar to his manager on the Kingston Colonials, Dutch Schirick, who was also a local judge.
