= 1925 Philadelphia Phillies season =

Major League Baseball season

1925 Philadelphia Phillies
- League: National League
- Ballpark: Baker Bowl
- City: Philadelphia, Pennsylvania
- Owners: William F. Baker
- Managers: Art Fletcher

The 1925 Philadelphia Phillies season was a season in Major League Baseball. The Phillies finished seventh in the National League with a record of 68 wins and 85 losses.

== Offseason ==
The Phillies trained in Bradenton, Florida in 1925. Shortly after beginning camp, catcher Butch Henline was named team captain.

== Regular season ==
=== Season standings ===
National League
Team	W	L	Pct.	GB	Home	Road
Pittsburgh Pirates	95	58	.621	—	52‍–‍25	43‍–‍33
New York Giants	86	66	.566	8½	47‍–‍29	39‍–‍37
Cincinnati Reds	80	73	.523	15	44‍–‍32	36‍–‍41
St. Louis Cardinals	77	76	.503	18	48‍–‍28	29‍–‍48
Boston Braves	70	83	.458	25	37‍–‍39	33‍–‍44
Brooklyn Robins	68	85	.444	27	38‍–‍39	30‍–‍46
Philadelphia Phillies	68	85	.444	27	40‍–‍37	28‍–‍48
Chicago Cubs	68	86	.442	27½	37‍–‍40	31‍–‍46

=== Record vs. opponents ===
1925 National League record Sources:
Team	BSN	BRO	CHC	CIN	NYG	PHI	PIT	STL
Boston	—	13–8	12–10	9–13	11–11	6–16	7–15	12–10
Brooklyn	8–13	—	11–11	12–10	10–12	11–11	5–17	11–11
Chicago	10–12	11–11	—	10–12	7–15	10–12	12–10	8–14
Cincinnati	13–9	10–12	12–10	—	9–13	16–6	8–13	12–10
New York	11–11	12–10	15–7	13–9	—	13–8	10–12	12–9
Philadelphia	16–6	11–11	12–10	6–16	8–13	—	8–14	7–15
Pittsburgh	15–7	17–5	10–12	13–8	12–10	14–8	—	14–8
St. Louis	10–12	11–11	14–8	10–12	9–12	15–7	8–14	—

=== Roster ===
1925 Philadelphia Phillies
Roster
Pitchers: Huck Betts; Hal Carlson; Johnny Couch; Roy Crumpler; Art Decatur; Dana Fillingim; Bill Hubbell; Jack Knight; Clarence Mitchell; Skinny O'Neal; Ray Pierce; Jimmy Ring; Dutch Ulrich; Bob Vines; Claude Willoughby	Catchers: Butch Henline; Lew Wendell; Jimmie Wilson; Infielders: Lew Fonseca; Bernie Friberg; Chicken Hawks; Walter Holke; Clarence Huber; Wally Kimmick; Lenny Metz; Benny Meyer; Heinie Sand	Outfielders: George Burns; George Durning; George Harper; Freddy Leach; Johnny Mokan; Joe Schultz; Cy Williams; Russ Wrightstone	Manager: Art Fletcher; Coaches: Benny Meyer

== Player stats ==
=== Batting ===
==== Starters by position ====
Note: Pos = Position; G = Games played; AB = At bats; H = Hits; Avg. = Batting average; HR = Home runs; RBI = Runs batted in

Pos	Player	G	AB	H	Avg.	HR	RBI
C	Jimmie Wilson	108	335	110	.328	3	54
1B	Chicken Hawks	105	320	103	.322	5	45
2B	Bernie Friberg	91	304	82	.270	5	22
SS	Heinie Sand	148	496	138	.278	3	55
3B	Clarence Huber	124	436	124	.284	5	54
OF	Cy Williams	107	314	104	.331	13	60
OF	George Burns	88	349	102	.292	1	22
OF	George Harper	132	495	173	.349	18	97

==== Other batters ====
Note: G = Games played; AB = At bats; H = Hits; Avg. = Batting average; HR = Home runs; RBI = Runs batted in

Player	G	AB	H	Avg.	HR	RBI
Lew Fonseca	126	467	149	.319	7	60
Freddy Leach	65	292	91	.312	5	28
Russ Wrightstone	92	286	99	.346	14	61
Butch Henline	93	263	80	.304	8	48
Johnny Mokan	75	209	69	.330	6	42
Wally Kimmick	70	141	43	.305	1	10
Walter Holke	39	86	21	.244	1	17
Joe Schultz	24	64	22	.344	0	8
Lew Wendell	18	26	2	.077	0	3
George Durning	5	14	5	.357	0	1
Lenny Metz	11	14	0	.000	0	0
Benny Meyer	1	1	1	1.000	0	0

=== Pitching ===
==== Starting pitchers ====
Note: G = Games pitched; IP = Innings pitched; W = Wins; L = Losses; ERA = Earned run average; SO = Strikeouts

Player	G	IP	W	L	ERA	SO
Jimmy Ring	38	270.0	14	16	4.37	93
Hal Carlson	35	234.0	13	14	4.23	80
Clarence Mitchell	32	199.1	10	17	5.28	46
Claude Willoughby	3	23.0	2	1	1.96	6

==== Other pitchers ====
Note: G = Games pitched; IP = Innings pitched; W = Wins; L = Losses; ERA = Earned run average; SO = Strikeouts

Player	G	IP	W	L	ERA	SO
Art Decatur	25	128.0	4	13	5.27	31
Jack Knight	33	105.1	7	6	6.84	19
Huck Betts	35	97.1	4	5	4.55	28
Johnny Couch	34	94.1	5	6	5.44	11
Ray Pierce	23	90.0	5	4	5.50	18
Dutch Ulrich	21	65.0	3	3	3.05	29
Dana Fillingim	5	8.2	1	0	10.38	2
Roy Crumpler	3	4.2	0	0	7.71	1

==== Relief pitchers ====
Note: G = Games pitched; W = Wins; L = Losses; SV = Saves; ERA = Earned run average; SO = Strikeouts

Player	G	W	L	SV	ERA	SO
Skinny O'Neal	11	0	0	0	9.30	6
Bob Vines	3	0	0	0	11.25	0
Bill Hubbell	2	0	0	0	0.00	0
Bernie Friberg	1	0	0	0	4.50	1
