= Harry Baldwin (baseball) =

American baseball player (1900-1958)

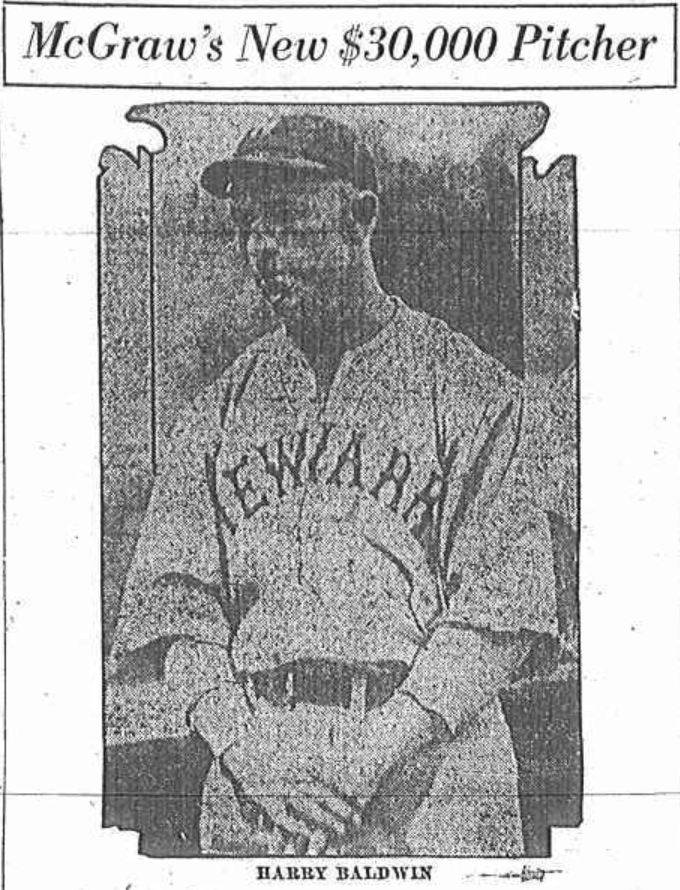
- Pitcher
- Born: June 3, 1900; Baltimore, Maryland
- Died: January 23, 1958 (aged 57); Baltimore, Maryland
- Batted: Right Threw: Right

MLB debut
- May 4, 1924, for the New York Giants

Last MLB appearance
- April 24, 1925, for the New York Giants

MLB statistics
- Win–loss record: 3–1
- Earned run average: 4.41
- Strikeouts: 5
- Stats at Baseball Reference

Teams
- New York Giants (1924–1925)

Howard "Harry" Edward Baldwin (June 3, 1900 – January 23, 1958) was a Major League baseball player. He was a right-handed pitcher for two seasons with the New York Giants, beginning in 1924. Prior to playing for the Giants, Baldwin played for three seasons (1921–1923) with the minor league Newark Bears.

For his career, Baldwin compiled a 3–1 record in 11 appearances, with a 4.41 earned run average and 5 strikeouts. He was a member of the Giants' pennant-winning team in 1924.
