= Denver Grigsby =

American baseball player (1901–1973)

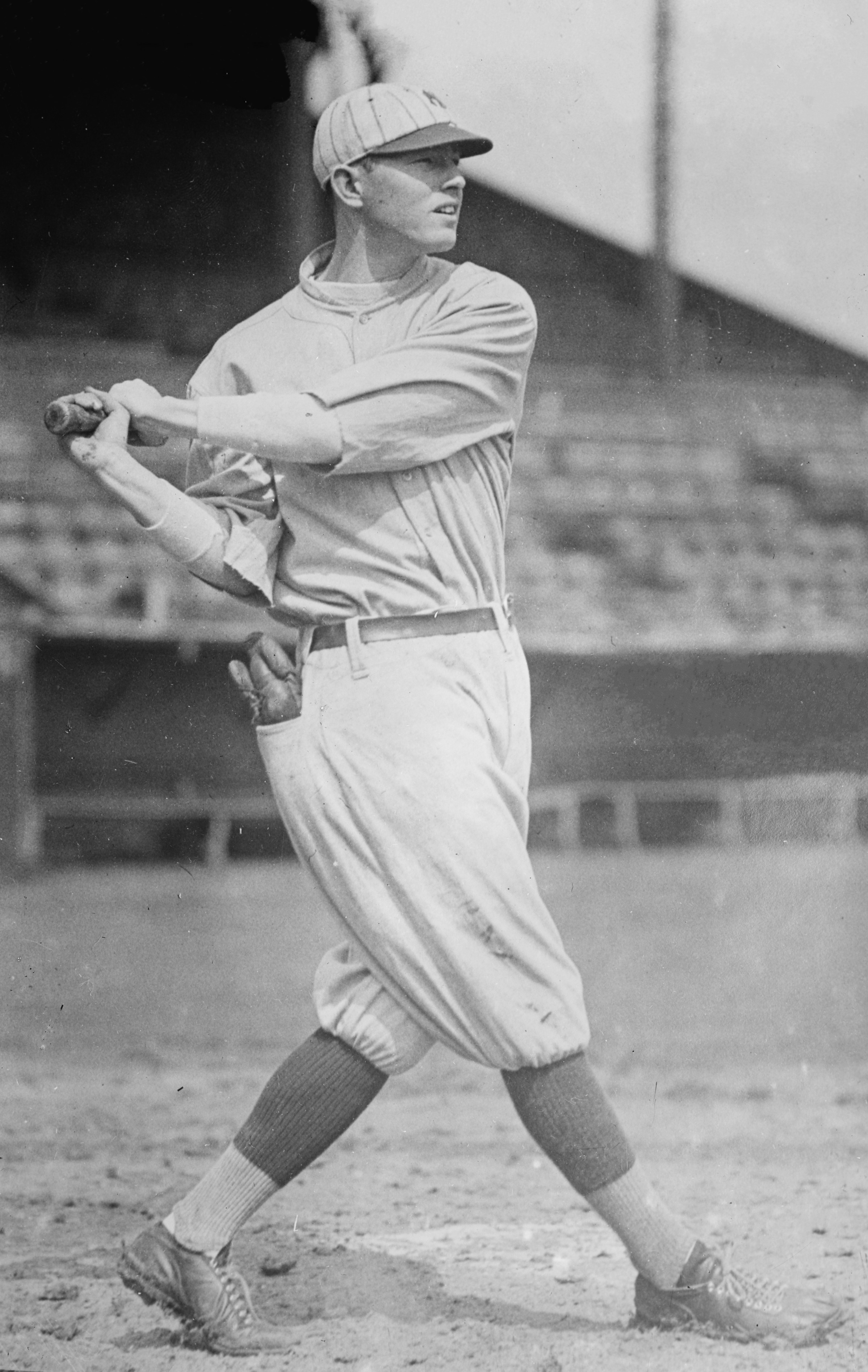
- Grigsby in 1922
- Outfielder
- Born: March 25, 1901; Jackson, Kentucky
- Died: November 10, 1973 (aged 72); Sapulpa, Oklahoma
- Batted: Left Threw: Right

MLB debut
- August 29, 1923, for the Chicago Cubs

Last MLB appearance
- October 2, 1925, for the Chicago Cubs

MLB statistics
- Batting average: .289
- Home runs: 3
- Runs batted in: 73
- Stats at Baseball Reference

Teams
- Chicago Cubs (1923–1925)

Denver Clarence Grigsby (March 25, 1901 – November 10, 1973) was an outfielder in Major League Baseball. He played for the Chicago Cubs from 1923 to 1925, and as a starter on the 1924 Cubs. Grigsby had a respectable career batting average of .289 with an on base percentage of .355 over a period of 199 MLB games.
