= Astyanax Douglass =

American baseball player (1897–1975)

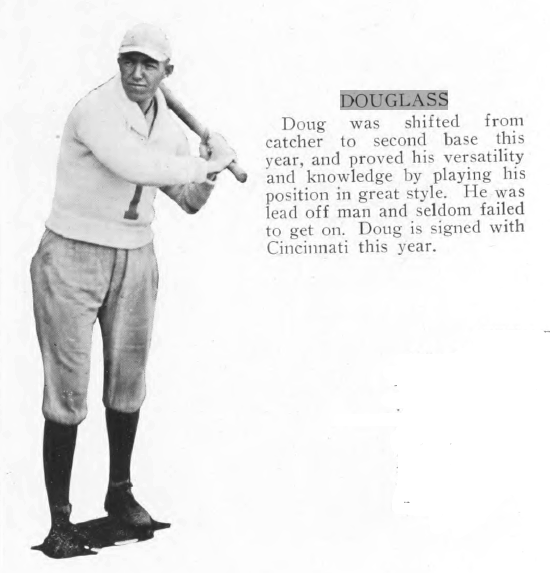
- Catcher
- Born: September 19, 1897; Covington, Texas, U.S.
- Died: January 26, 1975 (aged 77); El Paso, Texas, U.S.
- Batted: Left Threw: Right

MLB debut
- July 30, 1921, for the Cincinnati Reds

Last MLB appearance
- May 29, 1925, for the Cincinnati Reds

MLB statistics
- Batting average: .167
- Home run: 0
- Runs batted in: 1
- Stats at Baseball Reference

Teams
- Cincinnati Reds (1921, 1925)

Astyanax Saunders Douglass (September 19, 1897 – January 26, 1975) was an American Major League Baseball catcher. He played for the Cincinnati Reds in 1921 and 1925.

Born in Covington, Texas, Douglass attended Texas Christian University (TCU), where he played college baseball, college basketball and college football.

The Reds invited Douglass for a tryout mostly in an effort to entice his TCU batterymate, Pete Donohue, to join the team. Donohue caught on with the Reds while Douglass's trial was short lived.

Later in life, Douglass worked as a furniture dealer and operated a furniture warehouse in El Paso, Texas for several years. He died in 1975 in El Paso, Texas of a cardiac arrest.
