= Harry Biemiller =

American baseball player (1897–1965)

Harry Lee Biemiller
- Pitcher
- Born: October 9, 1897; Baltimore, Maryland, U.S.
- Died: May 25, 1965 (aged 67); Orlando, Florida, U.S.
- Batted: Right Threw: Right

MLB debut
- August 26, 1920, for the Washington Senators

Last MLB appearance
- August 26, 1925, for the Cincinnati Reds

MLB statistics
- Win–loss record: 1–1
- Earned run average: 4.22
- Strikeouts: 19
- Stats at Baseball Reference

Teams
- Washington Senators (1920); Cincinnati Reds (1925)

Harry Lee Biemiller (October 9, 1897 – May 25, 1965) was an American professional baseball player who played two seasons. He appeared in five games for the Washington Senators in 1920 and 23 games for the Cincinnati Reds in 1925 mostly as a relief pitcher.

Biemiller threw a no-hitter on Opening Day in 1921 as a member of the Jersey City Skeeters of the International League.
