= Jimmy Hudgens =

American baseball player (1902–1955)

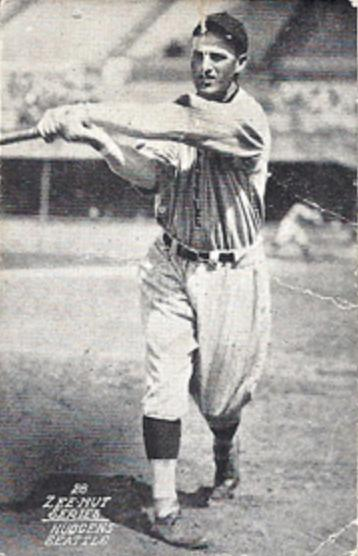
- First baseman
- Born: August 24, 1902; Newburg, Missouri, U.S.
- Died: August 25, 1955 (aged 53); St. Louis, Missouri, U.S.
- Batted: Left Threw: Right

MLB debut
- September 14, 1923, for the St. Louis Cardinals

Last MLB appearance
- September 25, 1926, for the Cincinnati Reds

MLB statistics
- Batting average: .282
- Home runs: 0
- Runs batted in: 1
- Stats at Baseball Reference

Teams
- St. Louis Cardinals (1923); Cincinnati Reds (1925–1926)

James Price Hudgens (August 24, 1902 – August 25, 1955) was an American Major League Baseball first baseman. He played parts of three seasons in the majors: 1923 for the St. Louis Cardinals and 1925-1926 for the Cincinnati Reds.

== Sources ==
- Career statistics from Baseball Reference · Baseball Reference (Minors) · Retrosheet · Baseball Almanac
