= Lou Koupal =

American baseball player (1898–1961)

- Pitcher
- Born: December 19, 1898; Tabor, South Dakota, U.S.
- Died: December 8, 1961 (aged 62); San Gabriel, California, U.S.
- Batted: Right Threw: Right

MLB debut
- April 17, 1925, for the Pittsburgh Pirates

Last MLB appearance
- September 26, 1937, for the St. Louis Browns

MLB statistics
- Win–loss record: 10–21
- Earned run average: 5.58
- Strikeouts: 87
- Stats at Baseball Reference

Teams
- Pittsburgh Pirates (1925–1926); Brooklyn Robins (1928–1929); Philadelphia Phillies (1929–1930); St. Louis Browns (1937)

Louis Laddie Koupal (December 19, 1898 – December 8, 1961) born in Tabor, South Dakota, was an American pitcher for the Pittsburgh Pirates (1925–26), Brooklyn Robins (1928–29), Philadelphia Phillies (1929–30) and St. Louis Browns (1937).

Koupal was of Czech descent. As a rookie in 1925, he appeared in six games, all in relief, for the Pirates, who would go on to win the World Series, though Koupal did not pitch in the postseason.

In six seasons, Koupal had a 10–21 won-lost record, 101 appearances, with 35 starts, 12 complete games, 40 games finished, 7 saves, 335 1/3 innings pitched, 436 hits allowed, 255 runs allowed, 208 earned runs allowed, 23 home runs allowed, 156 walks allowed, 87 strikeouts, 5 hit batsmen, 11 wild pitches, 1,560 batters faced and a career ERA of 5.58.

Koupal died in San Gabriel, California at the age of 62.
