= Mel Kerr =

Canadian baseball player (1903–1980)

- Pinch runner
- Born: May 22, 1903; Souris, Manitoba
- Died: August 9, 1980 (aged 77); Vero Beach, Florida
- Batted: Left Threw: Left

MLB debut
- September 16, 1925, for the Chicago Cubs

Last MLB appearance
- September 16, 1925, for the Chicago Cubs]

MLB statistics
- Batting average: .000
- Home runs: 0
- Runs batted in: 0
- Stats at Baseball Reference

Teams
- Chicago Cubs (1925)

John Melville Kerr (May 22, 1903 – August 9, 1980) was a Canadian-born major league baseball player.

During his minor league career, Kerr was an outfielder. On September 16, 1925, he became only the second Manitoban to make the majors. In that game, which was his only major league appearance, he came on as a pinch runner for the Chicago Cubs. Kerr scored a run for the only run of his career.
