= Bill Warwick (baseball) =

American baseball player (1897–1984)

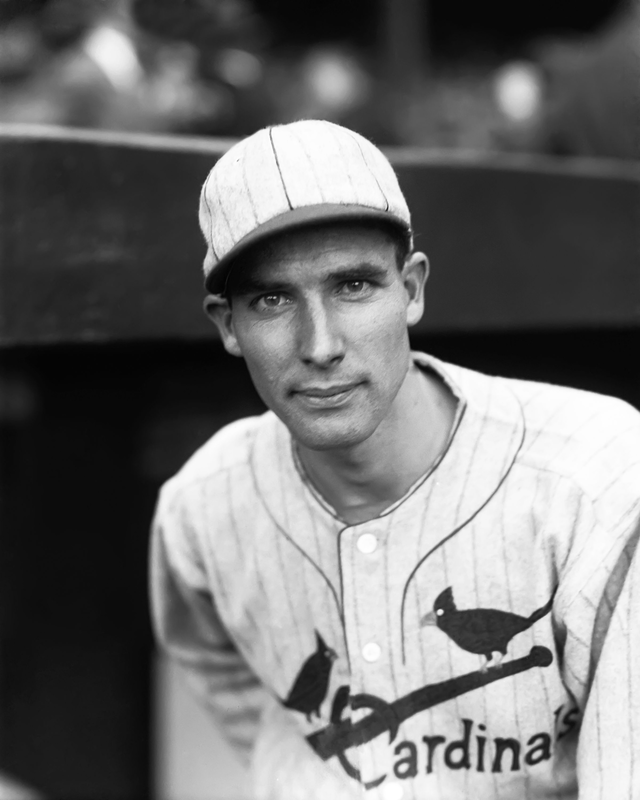
- Catcher
- Born: November 26, 1897; Philadelphia, Pennsylvania, U.S.
- Died: December 19, 1984 (aged 87); San Antonio, Texas, U.S.
- Batted: Right Threw: Right

MLB debut
- July 18, 1921, for the Pittsburgh Pirates

Last MLB appearance
- September 26, 1926, for the St. Louis Cardinals

MLB statistics
- Batting average: .304
- Home runs: 1
- Runs batted in: 8
- Stats at Baseball Reference

Teams
- Pittsburgh Pirates (1921); St. Louis Cardinals (1925–1926)

Firman Newton "Bill" Warwick (November 26, 1897 – December 19, 1984) was an American Major League Baseball player. He played for the Pittsburgh Pirates in 1921 and later for the St. Louis Cardinals.

== Formative years and family ==
Born in Philadelphia, Pennsylvania on November 26, 1897, Warwick was a son of Charles and Emily Warwick. A graduate of the University of Pennsylvania, he earned his Bachelor's degree in civil engineering. On 15 January 1925, he wed Marguerite Gibson in London, Ontario, Canada.

== Career ==
Warwick was a member of St. Louis' first championship team in 1926. He batted and threw right-handed, and in addition was the son-in-law of former Major Leaguer George Gibson.

In 23 major league games, Warwick posted a .304 batting average (17-for-56) with 8 runs, 1 home run and 8 RBI.

== Death ==
Warwick died in San Antonio, Texas on December 19, 1984.
