= George Gibson (baseball) =

Canadian baseball player (1880–1967)

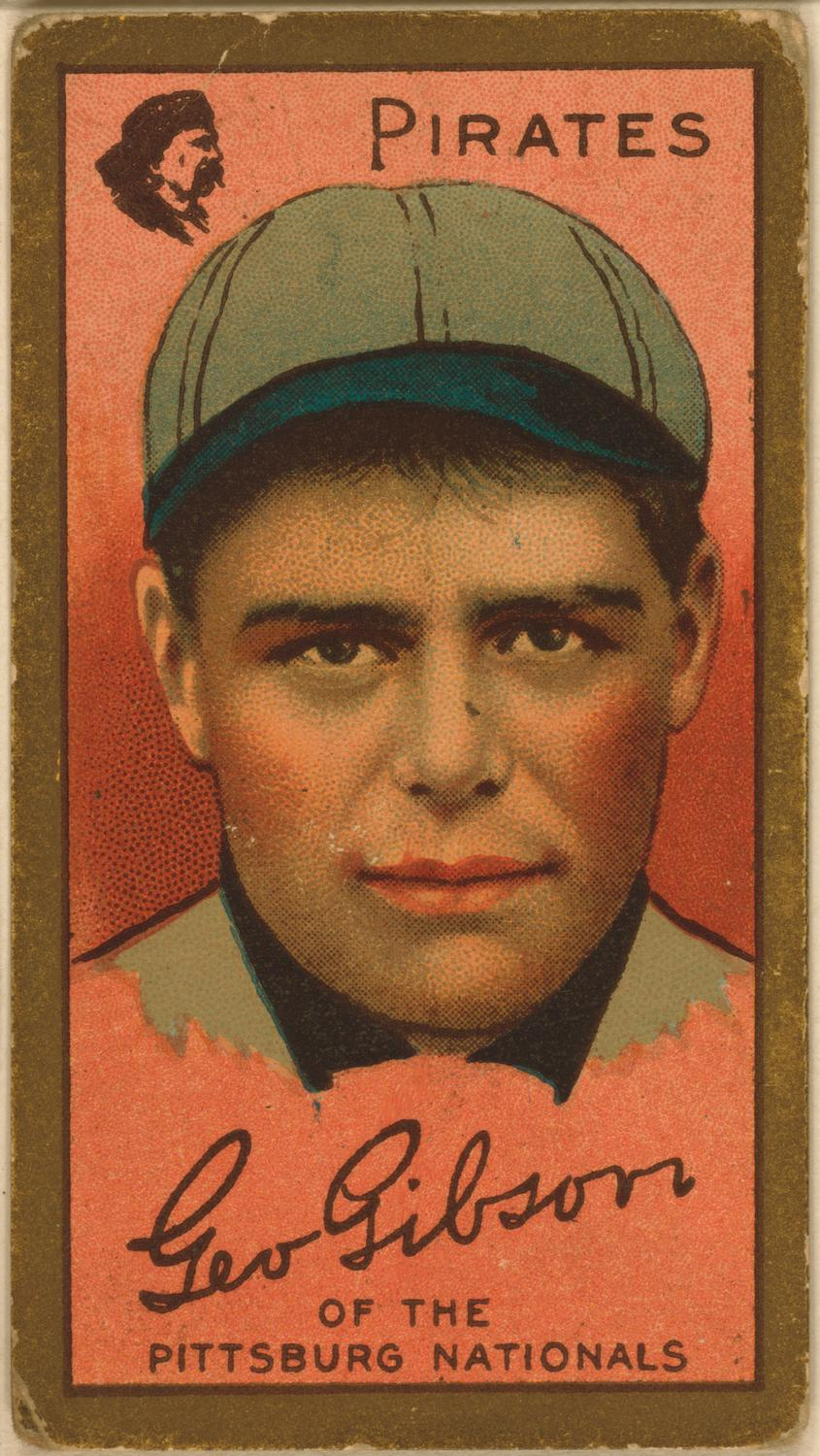
- Catcher / Manager
- Born: July 22, 1880; London, Ontario, Canada
- Died: January 25, 1967 (aged 86); London, Ontario, Canada
- Batted: Right Threw: Right

MLB debut
- July 2, 1905, for the Pittsburgh Pirates

Last MLB appearance
- August 20, 1918, for the New York Giants

MLB statistics
- Batting average: .236
- Home runs: 15
- Runs batted in: 346
- Games managed: 759
- Managerial record: 413–344
- Winning %: .546
- Stats at Baseball Reference
- Managerial record at Baseball Reference

Teams
- As player: Pittsburgh Pirates (1905–1916); New York Giants (1917–1918); As manager: Pittsburgh Pirates (1920–1922); Chicago Cubs (1925); Pittsburgh Pirates (1932–1934)

Career highlights and awards
- World Series champion (1909)

Member of the Canadian

Baseball Hall of Fame
- Induction: 1987

George C. Gibson (July 22, 1880 – January 25, 1967), nicknamed Mooney, was a Canadian professional baseball player, coach, scout, and manager. He played in Major League Baseball as a catcher from 1905 to 1918, most prominently for the Pittsburgh Pirates where he played the bulk of his career and was a member of the 1909 World Series winning team. Gibson spent the final two years of his career as a player-coach for the New York Giants. He later became a minor league manager for the Toronto Maple Leafs before returning to the major leagues as a manager for the Pirates and the Chicago Cubs.

Gibson played during a period in baseball history known as the Dead-ball era and, was regarded as one of the National League's premier catchers because of his impressive defensive skills and his strong, accurate throwing arm. He was also known for his smart pitch-calling and his ability to hold runners on base. His reputation as a defensive standout is enhanced because of the era in which he played. In the deadball era, catchers played a huge defensive role, given the large number of bunts and stolen base attempts, as well as the difficulty of handling the spitball pitchers who dominated pitching staffs. He had to catch every type of pitch imaginable, such as shine balls, spitballs, knuckleballs, and emory balls.

Gibson was inducted into Canada's Sports Hall of Fame in 1958, the Canadian Baseball Hall of Fame in 1987 and the London Sports Hall of Fame in 2002.

== Playing career ==
Gibson was born in London, Ontario, near Tecumseh Park, the oldest continually operating baseball grounds in the world (today's Labatt Memorial Park). He gained the nickname "Mooney" as a youngster. Some sources suggest that the nickname was inspired by his round, moon-shaped face, while other sources claim he picked up the nickname because he had played on a sandlot team known as the Mooneys. He began his professional baseball career in 1903 with the Buffalo Bisons of the Eastern League, managed by George Stallings. Numerous sources still associate Gibson with the Kingston Colonials of the Hudson River League but in a 1919 article, journalist Edward F. Balinger discusses this topic. Relaying something said by Gibson days earlier, he suggests that "somebody got him mixed with some other player shortly after he broke into the big league." George spent parts of two seasons playing for the Montreal Royals before his contract was purchased by the Pittsburgh Pirates in June 1905.

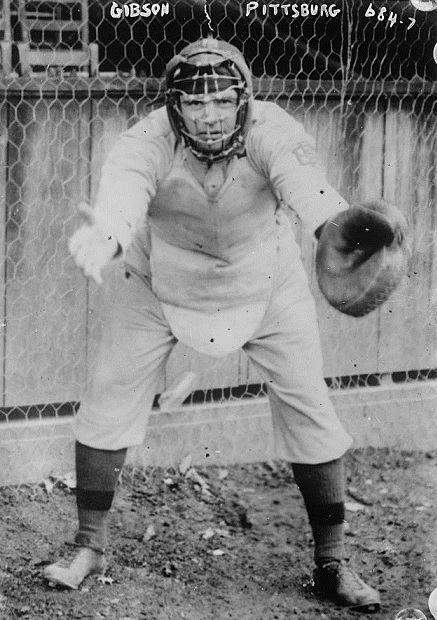
Gibson in his catcher's gear, with the Pittsburgh Pirates in 1908

Gibson made his major league debut July 2, 1905, at the age of 24. Gibson stood 5'11.5" and weighed 190 pounds, which was considered large for a baseball player of his era. Although he did not provide prolific offensive statistics, he did provide excellent defensive abilities and was a keen student of baseball strategy under the tutelage of Pirates manager Fred Clarke. The Pirates finished in second place three times in four seasons between 1905 and 1908. During the 1908 season, they were involved in a tight pennant race with the Chicago Cubs and the New York Giants. The Pirates were in first place going into the final day of the season but lost their final game to the eventual National League champion Chicago Cubs.

Gibson was in his prime during the 1909 season when he caught in 134 consecutive games, breaking the previous record of 133 consecutive games played as a catcher set by Deacon McGuire in 1895. He set another major league record for games played in a season by a catcher with 150, which was also previously held by McGuire since 1895. His games caught in a season record stood until 1920 when Ray Schalk caught 151 games. His record of 134 consecutive games caught would stand until 1940 when it was broken by Ray Mueller. Gibson hit a double for the final hit in the last game played at Pittsburgh's Exposition Park on June 29, 1909, and the following day had the first hit in the new Forbes Field.

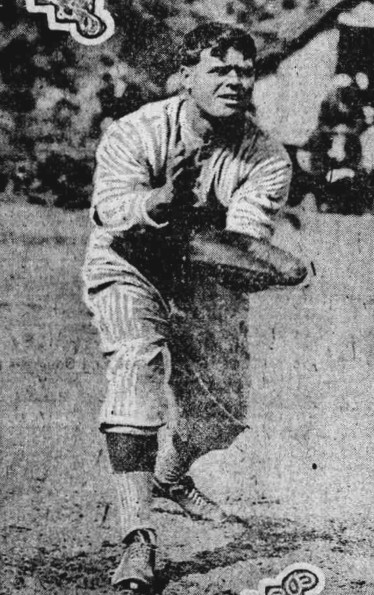
Gibson in 1916

Gibson had a career-high 52 runs batted in and helped guide the Pirates' pitching staff to finish second in the league in shutouts as well as in earned run average as the team clinched the 1909 National League pennant. He also led National League catchers in fielding percentage, baserunners caught stealing and in caught stealing percentage. Gibson then went on to catch every game in the 1909 World Series as the Pirates defeated the Detroit Tigers in seven games to win the world championship. Gibson held Detroit's Ty Cobb, the premier base stealer of his era, to only one stolen base during the series (Cobb also stole home plate during the series which wasn't charged against Gibson). Arriving back at the train station in his hometown of London, Ontario, on October 27, 1909, after winning the World Series, Gibson found more than 7,000 cheering fans to greet him. At the time, the population of London was approximately 35,000.

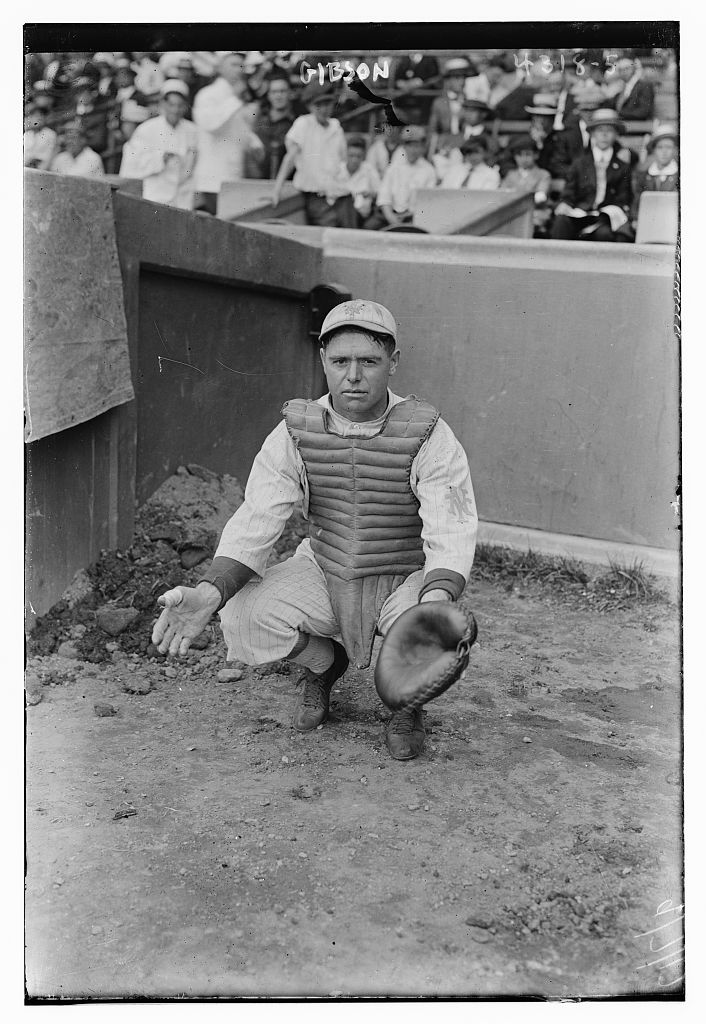
Gibson as a member of the New York Giants

Gibson was a workhorse during his career with the Pirates, leading National League catchers in games played for four consecutive seasons between 1907 and 1910. When Gibson began his major league career, most catchers were large, bulky men, however as baseball progressed during the Deadball era, the decrease in run production placed greater significance on stolen bases and bunts, which in turn emphasized the crucial defensive role played by catchers. As the sport evolved, teams began to field smaller, more agile players as catchers, typified by the emergence of Ray Schalk. A newspaper article of the day referred to Gibson as being part of the "dreadnought" type. He suffered a broken ankle in late-April of 1913 and missed two months of the season. Gibson returned to hit for a career-high .285 batting average in 102 games during the 1914 season. In August 1916 the 36-year-old Gibson was placed on waivers and claimed by the New York Giants, but he refused to report that year. Giants manager John McGraw persuaded him to join the Giants as a player-coach in 1917. Gibson played in his final major league game on August 20, 1918 at the age of 38.

== Career statistics ==
In a fourteen-year major league career, Gibson played in 1,213 games, accumulating 893 hits in 3,776 at bats for a .236 career batting average along with 15 home runs, 346 runs batted in and an on-base percentage of .295. He had a .977 career fielding percentage as a catcher which was 7 points higher than the league average for catchers during his career. He led all National League catchers in fielding percentage three times (1909, 1910, and 1912). Gibson caught 124 shutouts during his career, ranking him 7th all-time among major league catchers. Gibson was the Pirates catcher on September 20, 1907, when pitcher Nick Maddox threw a no-hitter against the Brooklyn Superbas. In his book, The Bill James Historical Baseball Abstract, baseball historian Bill James ranked Gibson 95th all-time among major league catchers.

== Managerial career ==
Gibson is also said to have accepted a coaching position with the Sacramento Solons of the Pacific Coast League in 1918. This can be traced at least as far back as a Sporting News article from 1933, which notes that he agreed to terms with the club, but does not specify a position. This isn't true, and rather, Gibson, the catcher, is likely being confused with an amateur pitcher of the same name. Gibson, the catcher, remained with the Giants until the 1918 season closed because of World War I, and returned to Canada until he was hired in 1919 to coach the Toronto Maple Leafs of the International League. In December 1919, Gibson was named the new manager of the Pittsburgh Pirates. He served as their manager from 1920 to 1922. He then spent the 1923 season as a coach for the Washington Senators. In 1925, he became a coach for the Chicago Cubs, but finished the season as manager after Rabbit Maranville was dismissed. The following season (1926), he returned to his coaching capacities for the Cubs, then remained with the Cubs as a scout until he was again called upon by the Pirates, to manage the 1932 team. Although Gibson recorded a .546 winning percentage as a manager, he was intolerant of team mistakes and his temperament left him ill-suited for the task of team politics. On June 19, 1934, the Pirates replaced Gibson with Pie Traynor.

On May 9, 1921, under manager Gibson, the Pittsburgh Pirates beat the London Tecumsehs 8–7 at Tecumseh Park before 3,500 people in an exhibition baseball game. Before the game, Gibson and his team were presented with a silver loving cup by the London Kiwanis Club. Gibson thrilled the locals by catching the opening inning with his 1909 battery-mate Babe Adams and singling and scoring a run in his lone at-bat. London Mayor Sid Little entertained the team that evening at his home.

== Post-career honours ==
Gibson was named Canada's baseball player of the half century in 1958 and was the first baseball player elected to Canada's Sports Hall of Fame. He was subsequently inducted into the Canadian Baseball Hall of Fame & Museum in the Class of 1987 and was one of the inaugural 10 inductees into the London Sports Hall of Fame in 2002. In February 1955 while organizers were planning the charter season of the Eager Beaver Baseball Association, Gibson was named "honorary lifetime president." Today, there is a commemorative plaque prominently displayed at the entrance to the main grandstand at Labatt Park in Gibson's honour. An interview of Gibson was included as a chapter in the 1966 baseball book, The Glory of Their Times, written by Lawrence Ritter.

== Connection to Labatt brewing family ==
When Gibson lived at 252 Central Avenue in London during the 1920s and 1930s, his immediate neighbours to the east were members of the Labatt brewing family, with whom he frequently socialized. According to George Gibson's late nephew, George Lambourn, Gibson played a significant role in the decision by John and Hugh Labatt to purchase Tecumseh Park and donate it to the City (along with $10,000 for repairs and maintenance), which occurred on December 31, 1936, after which Tecumseh Park was officially renamed "The John Labatt Memorial Athletic Park."

Gibson died at age 86 in London and is buried at Campbell Cemetery in Komoka, Ontario, not far from his Delaware farm. Gibson's former farm is on a road named in his honour after Gibson donated some land for public use to the area conservation authority of the day. Gibson was the nephew of William Southam, founder of Southam Newspapers, the brother of Richard Southam, manager of the London Tecumsehs, and the father-in-law of Bill Warwick, a major league baseball player in the 1920s.
