= Al Niehaus =

American baseball player (1899–1931)

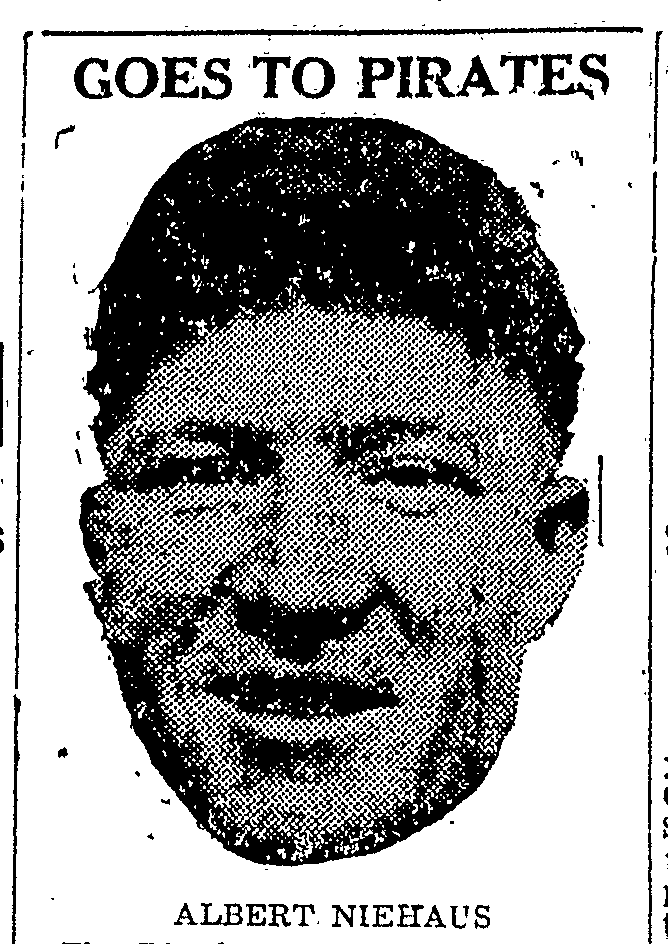
- First baseman
- Born: June 1, 1899; Cincinnati, Ohio, U.S.
- Died: October 14, 1931 (aged 32); Cincinnati, Ohio, U.S.
- Batted: Right Threw: Right

MLB debut
- April 22, 1925, for the Pittsburgh Pirates

Last MLB appearance
- September 23, 1925, for the Cincinnati Reds

MLB statistics
- Games played: 68
- Batting average: .275
- Runs batted in: 21
- Stats at Baseball Reference

Teams
- Pittsburgh Pirates (1925); Cincinnati Reds (1925)

Albert Bernard Niehaus (June 1, 1899 – October 14, 1931) was an American first baseman in Major League Baseball. He played for the Pittsburgh Pirates and Cincinnati Reds.

In 68 games during the 1925 season, Niehaus posted a .275 batting average (58-for-211) with 23 runs and 21 RBI without any home runs.
