= Al Moore (baseball) =

American baseball player (1902-1974)

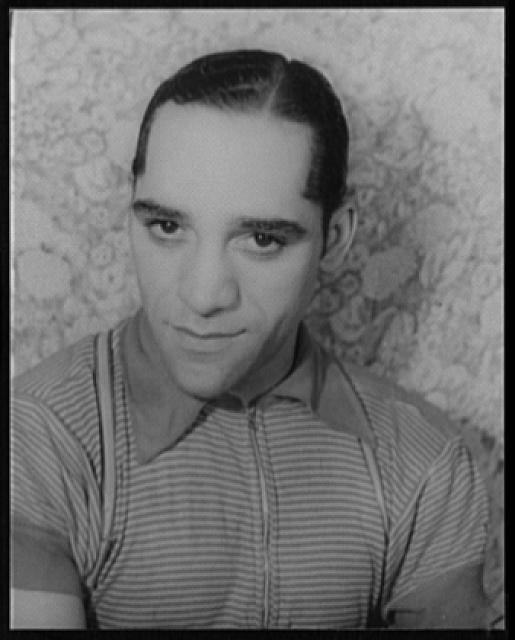
- Outfielder
- Born: August 4, 1902; Brooklyn, New York
- Died: November 29, 1974 (aged 72); Atlantic Ocean
- Batted: Right Threw: Right

MLB debut
- September 27, 1925, for the New York Giants

Last MLB appearance
- September 24, 1926, for the New York Giants

MLB statistics
- Batting average: .213
- Home runs: 0
- Runs batted in: 10
- Stats at Baseball Reference

Teams
- New York Giants (1925–1926)

Albert James Moore (August 4, 1902 – November 29, 1974) was an outfielder in Major League Baseball. He played for the New York Giants.
