= 1925 Major League Baseball season =

1925 MLB season
- League: American League (AL); National League (NL)
- Sport: Baseball
- Duration: Regular season: April 14 – October 4, 1925; World Series: October 7–15, 1925
- Games: 154
- Teams: 16 (8 per league)

Regular Season
- Season MVP: AL: Roger Peckinpaugh (WSH); NL: Rogers Hornsby (STL)
- AL champions: Washington Senators
- AL runners-up: Philadelphia Athletics
- NL champions: Pittsburgh Pirates
- NL runners-up: New York Giants

World Series
- Champions: Pittsburgh Pirates
- Runners-up: Washington Senators

MLB seasons
- ← 1924 1926 →

Locations of teams for the 1923–1931 American League seasons
American League
Locations of teams for the 1920–1931 National League seasons
National League

The 1925 major league baseball season began on April 14, 1925. The regular season ended on October 4, with the Pittsburgh Pirates and Washington Senators as the regular season champions of the National League and American League, respectively. The postseason began with Game 1 of the 22nd World Series on October 7 and ended with Game 7 on October 15. The Pirates defeated the Senators, four games to three, capturing their second championship in franchise history, since their previous in 1909. Going into the season, the defending World Series champions were the Washington Senators from the 1924 season.

This was the fourth of eight seasons that "League Awards", a precursor to the Major League Baseball Most Valuable Player Award (introduced in 1931), were issued.

== Schedule ==
The 1925 schedule consisted of 154 games for all teams in the American League and National League, each of which had eight teams. Each team was scheduled to play 22 games against the other seven teams of their respective league. This continued the format put in place since the 1904 season (except for 1919) and would be used until 1961 in the American League and 1962 in the National League.

Opening Day, April 14, featured all sixteen teams, continuing the trend which started with the previous season. The final day of the regular season was on October 4. The World Series took place between October 7 and October 15.

== Rule changes ==
The 1925 season saw the stipulation that the minimum home run distance was 250 feet.

== Teams ==
League	Team	City	Ballpark	Capacity	Manager
American League	Boston Red Sox	Boston, Massachusetts	Fenway Park	27,000	Lee Fohl
American League	Chicago White Sox	Chicago, Illinois	Comiskey Park	28,000	Eddie Collins
American League	Cleveland Indians	Cleveland, Ohio	Dunn Field	21,414	Tris Speaker
American League	Detroit Tigers	Detroit, Michigan	Navin Field	30,000	Ty Cobb
American League	New York Yankees	New York, New York	Yankee Stadium	58,000	Miller Huggins
American League	Philadelphia Athletics	Philadelphia, Pennsylvania	Shibe Park	33,500	Connie Mack
American League	St. Louis Browns	St. Louis, Missouri	Sportsman's Park	24,040	George Sisler
American League	Washington Senators	Washington, D.C.	Griffith Stadium	27,000	Bucky Harris
National League	Boston Braves	Boston, Massachusetts	Braves Field	40,000	Dave Bancroft
National League	Brooklyn Robins	New York, New York	Ebbets Field	26,000	Wilbert Robinson
National League	Chicago Cubs	Chicago, Illinois	Cubs Park	20,000	Bill Killefer
National League	Chicago Cubs	Chicago, Illinois	Cubs Park	20,000	Rabbit Maranville
National League	Chicago Cubs	Chicago, Illinois	Cubs Park	20,000	George Gibson
National League	Cincinnati Reds	Cincinnati, Ohio	Redland Field	20,696	Jack Hendricks
National League	New York Giants	New York, New York	Polo Grounds	43,000	John McGraw
National League	New York Giants	New York, New York	Polo Grounds	43,000	Hughie Jennings
National League	Philadelphia Phillies	Philadelphia, Pennsylvania	Baker Bowl	18,000	Art Fletcher
National League	Pittsburgh Pirates	Pittsburgh, Pennsylvania	Forbes Field	41,000	Bill McKechnie
National League	St. Louis Cardinals	St. Louis, Missouri	Sportsman's Park	24,040	Branch Rickey
National League	St. Louis Cardinals	St. Louis, Missouri	Sportsman's Park	24,040	Rogers Hornsby

== Standings ==
=== American League ===
American League
Team	W	L	Pct.	GB	Home	Road
Washington Senators	96	55	.636	—	53‍–‍22	43‍–‍33
Philadelphia Athletics	88	64	.579	8½	51‍–‍26	37‍–‍38
St. Louis Browns	82	71	.536	15	45‍–‍32	37‍–‍39
Detroit Tigers	81	73	.526	16½	43‍–‍34	38‍–‍39
Chicago White Sox	79	75	.513	18½	44‍–‍33	35‍–‍42
Cleveland Indians	70	84	.455	27½	37‍–‍39	33‍–‍45
New York Yankees	69	85	.448	28½	42‍–‍36	27‍–‍49
Boston Red Sox	47	105	.309	49½	28‍–‍47	19‍–‍58

=== National League ===
National League
Team	W	L	Pct.	GB	Home	Road
Pittsburgh Pirates	95	58	.621	—	52‍–‍25	43‍–‍33
New York Giants	86	66	.566	8½	47‍–‍29	39‍–‍37
Cincinnati Reds	80	73	.523	15	44‍–‍32	36‍–‍41
St. Louis Cardinals	77	76	.503	18	48‍–‍28	29‍–‍48
Boston Braves	70	83	.458	25	37‍–‍39	33‍–‍44
Brooklyn Robins	68	85	.444	27	38‍–‍39	30‍–‍46
Philadelphia Phillies	68	85	.444	27	40‍–‍37	28‍–‍48
Chicago Cubs	68	86	.442	27½	37‍–‍40	31‍–‍46

=== Tie games ===
4 tie games (4 in AL, 0 in NL), which are not factored into winning percentage or games behind (and were often replayed again) occurred throughout the season.

==== American League ====
The Detroit Tigers and New York Yankees had two tie games each. The Cleveland Indians, Philadelphia Athletics, St. Louis Browns, and Washington Senators had one tie game each.

- May 3, Detroit Tigers vs. Cleveland Indians, tied at 6 after a shortened game of seven innings to allow Detroit to catch a train for St. Louis.
- May 9, New York Yankees vs. St. Louis Browns, tied at 1 after a shortened game of seven innings on account of darkness.
- September 13, Philadelphia Athletics vs. Washington Senators, tied at 6 after 11 innings.
- September 27 (game 2), Detroit Tigers vs. New York Yankees, tied at 1 after a shortened game of five innings on account of darkness.

== Postseason ==
The postseason began on October 7 and ended on October 15 with the Pittsburgh Pirates defeating the Washington Senators in the 1925 World Series in seven games.

=== Bracket ===
World Series
AL	Washington Senators	3
NL	Pittsburgh Pirates	4

== Managerial changes ==
=== Off-season ===
Team	Former Manager	New Manager
Cincinnati Reds	Pat Moran	Jack Hendricks
New York Giants	Hughie Jennings	John McGraw
St. Louis Browns	Jimmy Austin	George Sisler

=== In-season ===
Team	Former Manager	New Manager
Chicago Cubs	Bill Killefer	Rabbit Maranville
Chicago Cubs	Rabbit Maranville	George Gibson
New York Giants	John McGraw	Hughie Jennings
St. Louis Cardinals	Branch Rickey	Rogers Hornsby

== League leaders ==
=== American League ===
Hitting leaders
Stat	Player	Total
AVG	Harry Heilmann (DET)	.393
OPS	Ty Cobb (DET)	1.066
HR	Bob Meusel (NYY)	33
RBI	Harry Heilmann (DET); Bob Meusel (NYY)	134
R	Johnny Mostil (CWS)	135
H	Al Simmons (PHA)	253
SB	Johnny Mostil (CWS)	43

Pitching leaders
Stat	Player	Total
W	Ted Lyons (CWS); Eddie Rommel (PHA)	21
L	Sad Sam Jones (NYY)	21
ERA	Stan Coveleski (WSH)	2.84
K	Lefty Grove (PHA)	116
IP	Herb Pennock (NYY)	277.0
SV	Firpo Marberry (WSH)	16
WHIP	Herb Pennock (NYY)	1.220

=== National League ===
Hitting leaders
Stat	Player	Total
AVG	Rogers Hornsby^{1} (STL)	.403
OPS	Rogers Hornsby (STL)	1.245
HR	Rogers Hornsby^{1} (STL)	39
RBI	Rogers Hornsby^{1} (STL)	143
R	Kiki Cuyler (PIT)	144
H	Jim Bottomley (STL)	227
SB	Max Carey (PIT)	46

^{1} National League Triple Crown batting winner

Pitching leaders
Stat	Player	Total
W	Dazzy Vance (BRO)	22
L	Burleigh Grimes (BRO)	19
ERA	Dolf Luque (CIN)	2.63
K	Dazzy Vance (BRO)	221
IP	Pete Donohue (CIN)	301.0
SV	Guy Bush (CHC); Johnny Morrison (PIT)	4
WHIP	Dolf Luque (CIN)	1.172

== Milestones ==
=== Batters ===
==== Cycles ====
- Kiki Cuyler (PIT):
  - Cuyler hit for his first cycle and eighth in franchise history, on June 4 against the Philadelphia Phillies.
- Max Carey (PIT):
  - Carey hit for his first cycle and ninth in franchise history, on June 20 against the Brooklyn Robins.
- Roy Carlyle (BOS):
  - Carlyle hit for his first cycle and fifth in franchise history, in game one of a doubleheader on July 21 against the Chicago White Sox.

==== Other batting accomplishments ====
- Tris Speaker (CLE):
  - Became the fifth member of the 3,000-hit club with a single in the ninth inning against the Washington Senators on May 17.
- Eddie Collins (CWS):
  - Became the sixth member of the 3,000-hit club with a single in the first inning against the Detroit Tigers on June 3.

=== Pitchers ===
==== No-hitters ====
- Dazzy Vance (BRO):
  - Vance threw his first career no-hitter and the seventh no-hitter in franchise history, by defeating the Philadelphia Phillies 10–1 in game one of a doubleheader on September 13. Vance walked one and struck out nine.

=== Miscellaneous ===
- Everett Scott (BOS):
  - Set a Major League record for most consecutive games at 1,307 on May 5.
- Philadelphia Athletics:
  - Tied a major league record by becoming the second team to overcome a 12-run deficit on June 15, the largest deficit ever overcome to win. The Athletics were in a 12-run deficit twice, 14–2 after the top of the sixth inning, and 15–3 after the top of the seventh inning. The Athletics would go on to win the game one7–15 over the Cleveland Indians.
- Detroit Tigers:
  - Tied a modern (1900–present) major league record set in 1923 for most runs scored in the sixth inning, by scoring 13 runs against the New York Yankees on June 17.

== Awards and honors ==
- League Award: Rogers Hornsby (STL, National); Roger Peckinpaugh (WSH, American)

== Home field attendance ==
Team name	Wins	%±	Home attendance	%±	Per game
Philadelphia Athletics	88	23.9%	869,703	63.5%	11,295
Chicago White Sox	79	19.7%	832,231	37.2%	10,808
Detroit Tigers	81	−5.8%	820,766	−19.1%	10,659
Washington Senators	96	4.3%	817,199	39.9%	10,753
Pittsburgh Pirates	95	5.6%	804,354	9.2%	10,446
New York Giants	86	−7.5%	778,993	−7.7%	10,250
New York Yankees	69	−22.5%	697,267	−33.8%	8,826
Brooklyn Robins	68	−26.1%	659,435	−19.5%	8,564
Chicago Cubs	68	−16.0%	622,610	−13.2%	8,086
Cincinnati Reds	80	−3.6%	464,920	−1.9%	6,117
St. Louis Browns	82	10.8%	462,898	−13.2%	5,935
Cleveland Indians	70	4.5%	419,005	−13.1%	5,442
St. Louis Cardinals	77	18.5%	404,959	48.4%	5,328
Boston Braves	70	32.1%	313,528	76.7%	4,125
Philadelphia Phillies	68	23.6%	304,905	1.7%	3,960
Boston Red Sox	47	−29.9%	267,782	−40.3%	3,570

== See also ==
- 1925 in baseball (Events, Births, Deaths)
