= 1925 in baseball =

The following are the baseball events of the year 1925 throughout the world.

== Champions ==
- World Series: Pittsburgh Pirates over Washington Senators (4–3)
- Negro World Series: Hilldale Daisies over Kansas City Monarchs (5–1)

NNL Championship Series			World Series
			ECL	Hilldale Club	5
NNL1	Kansas City	4	NNL	Kansas City	1
NNL2	St. Louis	3

== Awards and honors ==
- League Award
  - Roger Peckinpaugh, Washington Senators, SS
  - Rogers Hornsby, St. Louis Cardinals, 2B

== Statistical leaders ==
	American League		National League		Eastern Colored League		Negro National League	
Stat	Player	Total	Player	Total	Player	Total	Player	Total
AVG	Harry Heilmann (DET)	.393	Rogers Hornsby^{1} (STL)	.403	Oscar Charleston^{2} (HBG)	.427	Edgar Wesley (DTS)	.404
HR	Bob Meusel (NYY)	33	Rogers Hornsby^{1} (STL)	39	Oscar Charleston^{2} (HBG)	20	Turkey Stearnes (DTS)	19
RBI	Harry Heilmann (DET); Bob Meusel (NYY)	134	Rogers Hornsby^{1} (STL)	143	Oscar Charleston^{2} (HBG)	97	Turkey Stearnes (DTS)	126
W	Ted Lyons (CWS); Eddie Rommel (PHA)	21	Dazzy Vance (BRO)	22	Nip Winters (HIL)	17	Roosevelt Davis (SLS)	16
ERA	Stan Coveleski (WSH)	2.84	Dolf Luque (CIN)	2.63	George Britt (BBS)	3.01	Bill Foster (BBB/CAG)	1.62
K	Lefty Grove (PHA)	116	Dazzy Vance (BRO)	221	Rats Henderson (BG)	125	Bullet Rogan (KCM)	96

^{1} National League Triple Crown batting winner
^{2} Eastern Colored League Triple Crown batting winner

== Major league baseball final standings ==
=== American League final standings ===
American League
Team	W	L	Pct.	GB	Home	Road
Washington Senators	96	55	.636	—	53‍–‍22	43‍–‍33
Philadelphia Athletics	88	64	.579	8½	51‍–‍26	37‍–‍38
St. Louis Browns	82	71	.536	15	45‍–‍32	37‍–‍39
Detroit Tigers	81	73	.526	16½	43‍–‍34	38‍–‍39
Chicago White Sox	79	75	.513	18½	44‍–‍33	35‍–‍42
Cleveland Indians	70	84	.455	27½	37‍–‍39	33‍–‍45
New York Yankees	69	85	.448	28½	42‍–‍36	27‍–‍49
Boston Red Sox	47	105	.309	49½	28‍–‍47	19‍–‍58

Locations of teams for the 1923–1931 American League seasons
American League

=== National League final standings ===
National League
Team	W	L	Pct.	GB	Home	Road
Pittsburgh Pirates	95	58	.621	—	52‍–‍25	43‍–‍33
New York Giants	86	66	.566	8½	47‍–‍29	39‍–‍37
Cincinnati Reds	80	73	.523	15	44‍–‍32	36‍–‍41
St. Louis Cardinals	77	76	.503	18	48‍–‍28	29‍–‍48
Boston Braves	70	83	.458	25	37‍–‍39	33‍–‍44
Brooklyn Robins	68	85	.444	27	38‍–‍39	30‍–‍46
Philadelphia Phillies	68	85	.444	27	40‍–‍37	28‍–‍48
Chicago Cubs	68	86	.442	27½	37‍–‍40	31‍–‍46

Locations of teams for the 1920–1931 National League seasons
National League

== Negro leagues final standings ==
All Negro leagues standings below are per MLB and Seamheads.

=== Negro National League final standings ===
This was the sixth season of the first Negro National League. This was the first season in which a playoff was held to determine the pennant, for which the first half leader would be matched against the second half winner. Kansas City won the first half while St. Louis won the second half. As such, they met for a best-of-seven Championship Series. Kansas City would win the series in seven games to win their first pennant.

vs. Negro National League						vs. Major Black teams			
Negro National League	W	L	T	Pct.	GB	W	L	T	Pct.
^{(1)} Kansas City Monarchs	58	20	2	.738	—	66	26	2	.713
^{(2)} St. Louis Stars	67	29	2	.694	—	67	29	2	.694
Detroit Stars	56	39	0	.589	10½	57	45	0	.559
Chicago American Giants	49	39	2	.556	14	58	44	2	.567
Memphis Red Sox	35	53	1	.399	28	35	53	1	.399
Cuban Stars (West)	20	31	0	.392	24½	20	31	0	.392
Birmingham Black Barons	26	61	1	.301	36½	26	63	1	.294
Indianapolis ABCs	16	54	0	.229	38	16	55	0	.225

^{(1)} First half champion ^{(2)} Second half champion

Locations of teams for the 1925 Negro National League season
Negro National League
Traveling team: Cuban Stars (West)

=== Eastern Colored League final standings ===
This was the third of six seasons for the Eastern Colored League. According to the Center for Negro League Baseball Research, it was common practice for the teams in the league to all play a different number of games during the season. The Wilmington Potomacs dropped out of the league in July 1925. Hilldale Club faced the Kansas City Monarchs in the second overall Colored World Series.

vs. Eastern Colored League						vs. Major Black teams			
Eastern Colored League	W	L	T	Pct.	GB	W	L	T	Pct.
Hilldale Club	45	13	1	.771	—	53	20	1	.723
Harrisburg Giants	37	17	1	.682	6	48	25	1	.655
Baltimore Black Sox	31	20	2	.604	10½	37	33	2	.528
Atlantic City Bacharach Giants	26	28	2	.482	17	36	37	2	.493
Brooklyn Royal Giants	13	20	1	.397	19½	14	20	1	.414
Cuban Stars (East)	15	26	1	.369	21½	18	26	1	.411
Wilmington Potomacs†	8	20	2	.300	22	12	24	2	.342
New York Lincoln Giants	7	38	2	.170	31½	8	41	2	.176

†Wilmington folds mid-July before the conclusion of the season.

Locations of teams for the 1925 Eastern Colored League season
Eastern Colored League

=== Independent teams final standings ===
The Homestead Grays were not a part of any league but were considered major-league tier.

vs. All Teams
Independent Clubs	W	L	T	Pct.	GB
Homestead Grays	2	1	0	.667	—

== Events ==
- April 5 - New York Yankees slugger Babe Ruth collapses at a rail station in Ashville, South Carolina. A binge of hot dogs and soda cause what sports writers dubbed "The Bellyache Heard Around the World". Ruth would make his return to the line-up seven weeks later.
- April 14
  - On opening day, there is a slugfest in St. Louis as the Browns and visiting Cleveland Indians put up a combined 35 runs. Cleveland puts up twelve in the eighth, and wins 21–14.
  - Hall of Famer Lefty Grove is the opening day starter for the Philadelphia Athletics. He lasts 3.2 innings, and gives up five runs (four earned) in his major league debut. Fellow Hall of Famer Mickey Cochrane also makes his major league debut, and is one-for-two as the A's defeat the Boston Red Sox, 9–8 in ten innings.
- April 21 – The National League cancels the entire slate of games due to the death of Brooklyn Dodgers owner Charles Ebbets three days prior from a heart attack. Edward McKeever assumes the title of president of the club. However, McKeever's tenure is short lived, as he dies eight days later from influenza.
- May 1 – Jimmie Foxx hits a double in his first major league at-bat. His Athletics lose 9–4 to the Washington Senators.
- May 5
  - Detroit Tigers player/manager Ty Cobb hits three home runs, a double and two singles, to lead his team to a 14–8 victory against the St. Louis Browns at Sportsman's Park.
  - Everett Scott's record streak of 1‚307 consecutive games played comes to an end as he is replaced by rookie Pee-Wee Wanninger at shortstop in the 6–2 loss to the Philadelphia Athletics. His mark will be broken by Lou Gehrig on August 17, 1933.
- May 7 – Pittsburgh Pirates shortstop Glenn Wright turns the fifth unassisted triple play in Major League history in the ninth inning of a 10–9 loss to the St. Louis Cardinals.
- May 17 – The Cleveland Indians' Tris Speaker gets his 3,000th hit, off Tom Zachary, in a 2–1 loss to the Washington Senators.
- June 1 – Lou Gehrig pinch hits for Pee-Wee Wanninger, beginning a 2,130 consecutive game streak.
- June 2 – After losing five in a row, New York Yankees manager Miller Huggins "shakes up" the slumping lineup by replacing first baseman Wally Pipp in the starting lineup with Lou Gehrig, and second baseman Aaron Ward with utility infielder Howie Shanks. The strategy works as Gehrig goes three-for-five with a run scored, and Shanks goes one-for-four with a run scored in the Yankees' 8–5 victory over the Washington Senators. Pipp only logs seventeen more plate appearances for the rest of the season, and is sold to the Cincinnati Reds for $7,500 following the season.
- June 6 – Eddie Collins of the Chicago White Sox records his 3000th career hit.
- July 23 – Yankees first baseman Lou Gehrig hits the first of his major league record 23 grand slams to beat Firpo Marberry and the Senators, 11–7.
- August 6 – Three American League teams put up ten runs, as the Chicago White Sox defeat the Boston Red Sox 10–0, the New York Yankees defeat the Detroit Tigers 10–4 and the Washington Senators defeat the St. Louis Browns 10–3.
- August 25 – Boston Red Sox catcher Al Stokes finishes an unusual double play, tagging Detroit Tigers base runners Johnny Bassler and Fred Haney as they both simultaneously slide into home plate.
- August 27 – The St. Louis Browns' Bullet Joe Bush one hits the Washington Senators to complete a three-game sweep of the first place team.
- August 30 – After being swept by the St. Louis Browns at Sportsman's Park, the Washington Senators come back and sweep the Chicago White Sox at Comiskey Park. They sweep the second place Philadelphia Athletics on September 1 & 2 to build a 5.5 game lead, and coast the remainder of the way to their second consecutive American League championship.
- September 13 – Dazzy Vance pitches a no-hitter for the Brooklyn Robins in a 10–1 win over the Philadelphia Phillies.
- September 25 – Rogers Hornsby of the St. Louis Cardinals is fined $500 and stood down for the remainder of the season after refusing to take the field against the Brooklyn Robins.
- September 27 – 1925 National League Most Valuable Player Rogers Hornsby goes three-for-three to raise his batting average to .403. The Cardinals, however, lose 7–6 to the Boston Braves. With the Cards 19 games back of first place, Hornsby sits out the remaining four games on his team's schedule to secure a .400 average for the third time in his career.
- September 28 – The Washington Senators are guests of President Calvin Coolidge at the White House, becoming the first reigning World Series champions to visit the White House.
- October 2
  - Leo Durocher makes his major league debut in the Yankees' 10–0 loss to the Philadelphia Athletics.
  - Replacing Rogers Hornsby at second base in the St. Louis Cardinals' line-up, Specs Toporcer is the hitting star of the Cardinals' 4–3 victory over the Chicago Cubs with a home run, double and two runs scored. Toporcer goes eight-for-eighteen filling in for Hornsby in the final four games on the Cardinals' schedule.
- October 4 – Ty Cobb pitches a 1-2-3 ninth inning in the Detroit Tigers' 11–6 victory over the St. Louis Browns.
- October 7 – Walter Johnson's pitching leads the Washington Senators to a 4–1 victory over the Pittsburgh Pirates in game one of the 1925 World Series. Senators shortstop Roger Peckinpaugh commits the first of a record eight errors in the series.
- October 8 – Kiki Cuyler's two-run home run in the eighth inning carriers the Pittsburgh Pirates to a 3–2 victory in the second game of the World Series.
- October 10 – The Washington Senators come from behind to take game three of the World Series.
- October 11 – Walter Johnson wins his second game of the 1925 World Series, holding the Pirates to six hits, and no runs.
- October 12 – The Pirates take game five of the World Series, 6–3. Clyde Barnhart is the hitting star of the game, going two-for-four with two RBIs and a run scored.
- October 13 – Eddie Moore leads the fifth inning off with a home run to break a 2–2 tie as the Pirates even the World Series at three games apiece.
- October 15 – Walter Johnson again took the mound for Game seven, and carried a 6–4 lead into the bottom of the seventh inning, but errors by 1925 American League Most Valuable Player Roger Peckinpaugh in the seventh and eighth innings lead to four unearned runs, and the Pittsburgh Pirates defeat the Washington Senators, 9–7. The Pirates become the first team in a best-of-seven Series to overcome a 3–1 Series deficit to win the World Championship.
- October 21 – Marv Goodwin, a former pitcher for the Washington Senators and St. Louis Cardinals who joined the Cincinnati Reds at the end of the season, is killed in a plane he was piloting. Goodwin was one of the original spitballers whose method for getting batters out was grandfathered when that pitch was deemed illegal. At age 34, Goodwin becomes the first active Major League player to die from injuries sustained in an airplane crash.

== Births ==
=== January ===
- January 4 – Tom Gorman
- January 7 – Gene Collins
- January 12 – Ed Stevens
- January 17 – Hank Schmulbach
- January 19 – Alice Hohlmayer
- January 19 – Marilyn Jones
- January 22 – Johnny Bucha
- January 22 – Bobby Young
- January 24 – Meryle Fitzgerald
- January 30 – Brooks Lawrence

=== February ===
- February 2 – Joe Szekely
- February 3 – Harry Byrd
- February 5 – Jack Maguire
- February 8 – Milt Nielsen
- February 9 – Vic Wertz
- February 11 – Sara Reeser
- February 13 – Mike Palm
- February 14 – Buddy Lively
- February 18 – Joe Lutz
- February 19 – Takumi Otomo
- February 22 – Bob Wilson

=== March ===
- March 1 – Bob Usher
- March 3 – George Eyrich
- March 5 – Mary Rini
- March 10 – Lou Limmer
- March 10 – Amy Shuman
- March 13 – Ray Martin
- March 18 – Fred Hatfield
- March 20 – Al Widmar
- March 21 – Phil Pepe
- March 24 – Dick Kryhoski

=== April ===
- April 6 – Hal Schacker
- April 10 – Pete Milne
- April 11 – Bob Spicer
- April 16 – Alton Brown
- April 23 – Buddy Peterson
- April 24 – Theda Marshall
- April 28 – Clarence Marshall
- April 30 – Marie Wegman

=== May ===
- May 1 – Anna Mae Hutchison
- May 2 – Ralph Brickner
- May 5 – Bob Cerv
- May 5 – Johnny Rutherford
- May 12 – Yogi Berra
- May 14 – Sophie Kurys
- May 14 – Les Moss
- May 20 – Lee Griffeth
- May 21 – Margaret Wenzell
- May 25 – Don Liddle
- May 31 – Colleen Smith

=== June ===
- June 2 – Hazel Measner
- June 4 – Dick Aylward
- June 8 – Del Ennis
- June 8 – Eddie Gaedel
- June 9 – Jim Pearce
- June 11 – Al Smith
- June 14 – Fenton Mole
- June 15 – Gene Baker
- June 20 – Clem Koshorek
- June 24 – Jack Banta
- June 24 – Wally Yonamine
- June 27 – Wayne Terwilliger
- June 29 – Bill Connelly
- June 29 – Nippy Jones

=== July ===
- July 2 – Isaiah Harris
- July 15 – Bob Wellman
- July 18 – Windy McCall
- July 21 – Earl Mossor
- July 22 – Elise Harney
- July 26 – Jackie Mayo
- July 26 – Emily Stevenson
- July 30 – Bill Glynn
- July 30 – Bill Moisan
- July 31 – Harry Malmberg

=== August ===
- August 1 – Bobby Balcena
- August 3 – Dave Hoskins
- August 5 – Tony Jacobs
- August 5 – Ruth Born
- August 15 – Ruth Lessing
- August 16 – Willie Jones
- August 20 – Larry Miggins
- August 25 – Earle Brucker
- August 26 – Billy DeMars
- August 28 – Johnny Pramesa
- August 30 – George Wilson
- August 31 – Paul Hinrichs
- August 31 – Pete Vonachen

=== September ===
- September 8 – Mary Carey
- September 9 – Dorothy Christ
- September 12 – Stan Lopata
- September 13 – Frank Cashen
- September 17 – Shigeru Sugishita
- September 18 – Harvey Haddix
- September 24 – Wally Hood
- September 26 – Bobby Shantz
- September 28 – Fredda Acker
- September 28 – Vince Gonzales
- September 28 – Bill Jennings
- September 28 – Carolyn Morris
- September 29 – Tom Hamilton

=== October ===
- October 3 – Chris Haughey
- October 5 – Bobby Hofman
- October 7 – Mildred Earp
- October 9 – Tommy Giordano
- October 18 – Joyce Barnes
- October 20 – Chuck Brayton
- October 21 – Valmy Thomas
- October 25 – Roy Hartsfield
- October 26 – Lee Surkowski
- October 28 – Luis Márquez

=== November ===
- November 3 – Irene Kerwin
- November 4 – Spook Jacobs
- November 6 – Bob Addis
- November 9 – Bill Bruton
- November 10 – Hank Ruszkowski
- November 13 – Jim Delsing
- November 13 – Betty Whiting
- November 17 – Jean Faut
- November 18 – Gene Mauch
- November 19 – Chuck Comiskey
- November 21 – Lillian DeCambra
- November 29 – Minnie Miñoso

=== December ===
- December 1 – Niles Jordan
- December 1 – Cal McLish
- December 3 – Harry Simpson
- December 4 – Ted Toles Jr.
- December 6 – Rance Pless
- December 8 – Hank Thompson
- December 11 – Dick Hoover
- December 14 – Toothpick Sam Jones
- December 19 – Loretta Dwojak
- December 21 – Dorothy Kamenshek
- December 21 – Kent Peterson
- December 21 – Bob Rush
- December 23 – Ed Blake
- December 25 – Ned Garver
- December 25 – Dorothy Mueller
- December 26 – Lucille Stone
- December 29 – Joyce Hill
- December 31 – Dorothy Kovalchick

== Deaths ==
=== January–February ===
- January 1 – Hank Simon, 62, outfielder for the Cleveland Blues, Brooklyn Gladiators and Syracuse Stars of the American Association between the 1887 and 1890 seasons.
- January 16 – George Bignell, 66, backup catcher for the 1884 Milwaukee Brewers of the Union Association.
- January 25 – Cy Bowen, 63, pitcher for the 1896 New York Giants of the National League.
- January 25 – John B. Day, 77, first owner (1883 to 1892) of the New York Giants; later, field manager of the Giants for the first 66 games of the 1899 season.
- February 15 – Duke Farrell, 58, durable catcher who caught 1565 games from 1888 to 1905 while playing with seven different teams, particularly for the 1903 Boston Americans, the champion team in the first World Series ever played, and also a four-time .300 hitter who led the American Association in home runs and runs batted in 1891.
- February 18 – Charlie Dougherty, 63, infielder/outfielder for the 1884 Altoona Mountain City of the Union Association.
- February 20 – John Mansell, 66, outfielder for the 1882 Philadelphia Athletics of the American Association.

=== March–April ===
- March 4 – John Montgomery Ward, 65, Hall of Fame pitcher who posted 164–102 record and a 2.10 earned run average in 293 games, including 47 wins for 1879 champion Providence Grays and a perfect game in 1880. He then became a shortstop, batting over .325 three times, to become the fifth player to reach the 2000 hit club. In addition, he organized the first players' union in 1888, and formed the Players' League in 1890.
- March 21 – Harry Raymond, 63, infielder who played with the Louisville Colonels of the American Association (1888–1891) and for the Pittsburgh Pirates and Washington Senators of the National League (1892).
- March 23 – Tom Evers, 72, second baseman for the 1882 Baltimore Orioles of the American Association and the 1884 Washington Nationals of the Union Association.
- April 18 – Charles Ebbets, 65, owner of Brooklyn's National League franchise since 1897 and the builder and namesake of Ebbets Field.
- April 19 – Suter Sullivan, 52, infielder/outfielder who played from 1898 to 1899 for the Cleveland Spiders and Baltimore Orioles of the National League.
- April 23 – Ad Gumbert, 56, pitcher who collected a 123–102 record for the Chicago Cubs, Boston Reds, Pittsburgh Pirates and Philadelphia Phillies from 1888 through 1896.
- April 27 – Fred Crane, 84, first baseman for the Elizabeth Resolutes (1873) and the Brooklyn Atlantics (1875) of the National Association of Professional Base Ball Players.
- April 29 – Ed McKeever, 66, co-owner of Brooklyn Robins since 1912 who succeeded Charles Ebbets as team president, but died from influenza only 11 days after Ebbets.

=== May–June ===
- May 9 – Ed Beatin, 58, National League pitcher for the Detroit Wolverines and Cleveland Spiders from 1887 to 1891, and a member of the 1887 champion Wolverines.
- May 10 – Tod Brynan, 61, National League pitcher/left fielder for the Chicago White Stockings (1888) and the Boston Beaneaters (1891).
- May 31 – Harry Deane, 79, National Association outfielder for the Fort Wayne Kekiongas (1871) and the Baltimore Canaries (1874), who also managed briefly the Fort Wayne team.
- June 5 – Sam Trott, 66, National League catcher for the Boston Red Caps, Detroit Wolverines and Baltimore Orioles, who later managed the Washington Statesmen in 1891.
- June 26 – Sam Crane, 71, 19th century second baseman in seven seasons for the New York Metropolitans, Cincinnati Outlaw Reds, Detroit Wolverines, St. Louis Maroons, New York Giants and Pittsburgh Alleghenys, who also managed and later went on to a long career as a sportswriter.

=== July–August ===
- July 4 – George Derby, 87, pitcher for the Detroit Wolverines (1881–1882) and Buffalo Bisons (1885) of the National League, who led the circuit for the most strikeouts in 1881.
- August 2 – Patrick T. Powers, 63, founder of the minor leagues' governing body and its first president from 1901 to 1909.
- August 13 – Arthur Soden, 82, American Civil War veteran and owner or co-owner of the National League's Boston Red Stockings/Red Caps/Beaneaters franchise from 1876 to 1906, who also served as NL president in 1882; under his ownership, Boston won seven NL pennants between 1876 and 1898.
- August 14 – Asa Stratton, 72, shortstop who played for the 1881 Worcester Ruby Legs.

=== September–October ===
- September 5 – Emil Huhn, 33, first baseman and catcher for the Federal League's Newark Pepper (1915) and the National League's Cincinnati Reds (1916–1917).
- September 11 – Pat Duff, 50, pinch-hitter for the 1906 Washington Senators of the American League.
- September 21 – Charlie Irwin, 56, third baseman who played from 1893 through 1902 for the Chicago Colts, Cincinnati Reds and Brooklyn Superbas of the National League.
- September 22 – Dave Beadle, 61, catcher/outfielder for the 1884 Detroit Wolverines of the National League.
- October 7 – Christy Mathewson, 45, Hall of Fame pitcher for the New York Giants, whose 373 victories and a 2.13 earned run average included two no-hitters and thirteen 20-win seasons. Notably, Mathewson reached 30 wins four times and posted an ERA under 2.00 five times, including a National League record of 37 wins in 1908, while leading the circuit in ERA and strikeouts five times each; in wins and shutouts four times, setting league's career records for wins, strikeouts, games and shutout. Other of his highlights includes having pitched three shutouts in a six-day span to lead the Giants to the 1905 World Series title.
- October 19 – Jack Carney, 58, National League first baseman for the Washington Nationals, Buffalo Bisons and Cleveland Infants from 1889 to 1890.
- October 21 – Marv Goodwin, 34, former pitcher for the Washington Senators, St. Louis Cardinals and Cincinnati Reds between 1916 and 1925, and one of the original spitballers who was grandfathered when that pitch was deemed illegal.
- October 28 – Willy Wilson, 41, pitcher for the 1906 Washington Senators of the American League.

=== November–December ===
- November 1 – Roy Clark, 51, backup outfielder for the 1902 New York Giants of the National League.
- November 1 – Billy Serad, 62, National League pitcher who played between 1884 and 1888 with the Buffalo Bisons and Cincinnati Red Stockings.
- November 3 – Sam Frock, 42, National League pitcher for the Boston Doves/Rustlers and Pittsburgh Pirates between 1907 and 1911.
- November 6 – Hervey McClellan, 30, backup infielder for the Chicago White Sox from 1919 to 1924.
- November 7 – Sam Kimber, 73, pitcher for the 1884 Brooklyn Atlantics and the 1885 Providence Grays of the National League, who hurled a no-hitter in his first season.
- November 9 – Ralph Frary, 49, saloon-keeper and ex-minor league player who umpired 17 National League games during the 1911 season.
- November 20 – Walter Coleman, 52, pitcher for the 1895 St. Louis Cardinals.
- November 23 – Henry Lynch, 59, outfielder for the 1893 Chicago Colts of the National League.
- November 23 – Guerdon Whiteley, 66, backup outfielder for the Cleveland Blues (1884) and the Boston Beaneaters (1885) of the National League.
- December 19 – Corty Maxwell, 74, National Association umpire during the 1875 season.
- December 31 – Denny Sullivan, 67, third baseman for the Providence Grays 1879 National League champions and the 1880 Boston Red Caps.
