= Los Angeles Dodgers all-time roster =

List of baseball players

This list is complete and up-to-date as of the 2025 season.

The following is a list of players, both past and current, who appeared at least in one game for the Los Angeles Dodgers National League franchise (1958–present), and for the Brooklyn-based teams known as the Atlantics (1884), Grays (1885–1887), Bridegrooms (1888–1890, 1896–1898), Grooms (1891–1895), Superbas (1899–1910), Dodgers (1911–1913, 1932–1957) and Robins (1914–1931).

Players in Bold are members of the National Baseball Hall of Fame.

Players in Italics have had their numbers retired by the team.

== A ==
- Don Aase, P, 1990
- Bert Abbey, P, 1895–1896
- Cal Abrams, OF, 1949–1952
- Bobby Abreu, OF, 2012
- Tony Abreu, IF, 2007, 2009
- Terry Adams, P, 2000–2001
- Morrie Aderholt, OF, 1944–1945
- Hank Aguirre, P, 1968
- Nick Ahmed, IF, 2024
- Eddie Ainsmith, C, 1923
- Raleigh Aitchison, P, 1911, 1914–1915
- Hanser Alberto, IF, 2022
- Ed Albosta, P, 1941
- Luis Alcaraz, 2B/3B, 1967–1968
- Doyle Alexander, P, 1971
- Scott Alexander, P, 2018–2021
- Eliézer Alfonzo Jr., C, 2026
- **Dick Allen**, IF/OF, 1971
- Frank Allen, P, 1912–1914
- Horace Allen, OF, 1919
- Johnny Allen, P, 1941–1943
- Luke Allen, OF, 2002
- Mel Almada, OF, 1939
- Yency Almonte, P, 2022–2023
- Sandy Alomar Jr., C, 2006
- Whitey Alperman, 2B, 1906–1909
- Eddy Alvarez, IF/OF, 2022
- Orlando Álvarez, OF, 1973–1975
- Víctor Alvarez, P, 2002–2003
- Wilson Álvarez, P, 2003–2005
- Ed Amelung, OF, 1984, 1986
- Sandy Amorós, OF, 1952, 1954–1957, 1959–1960
- Brett Anderson, P, 2015–2016
- Dave Anderson, IF, 1983–1989, 1992
- Ferrell Anderson, C, 1946
- Garret Anderson, OF, 2010
- John Anderson, 1B/OF, 1894–1899
- Marlon Anderson, OF, 2006–2007
- Tyler Anderson, P, 2022
- Stan Andrews, C, 1944–1945
- Pat Ankenman, 2B, 1943–1944
- Eric Anthony, OF, 1997
- Bill Antonello, OF, 1953
- Ed Appleton, P, 1915–1916
- Jimmy Archer, C, 1918
- Danny Ardoin, C, 2008
- Jamie Arnold, P, 1999–2000
- Erisbel Arruebarrena, SS, 2014
- Andy Ashby, P, 2001–2003
- Billy Ashley, OF, 1992–1997
- Bob Aspromonte, IF, 1956, 1960–1961
- Pedro Astacio, P, 1992–1997
- Rick Auerbach, SS, 1974–1976
- Brad Ausmus, C, 2009–2010
- Bruce Aven, OF, 2000–2001
- Luis Avilán, P, 2015–2017
- John Axford, P, 2018
- Willy Aybar, IF, 2005–2006

== B ==
- Charlie Babb, SS, 1904–1905
- Johnny Babich, P, 1934–1935
- Danys Báez, P, 2006
- Pedro Báez, P, 2014–2020
- Bob Bailey, 3B, 1967–1968
- Gene Bailey, OF, 1923–1924
- Sweetbreads Bailey, P, 1921
- Bob Bailor, IF, 1984–1985
- Doug Baird, 3B, 1919–1920
- Dusty Baker, OF, 1976–1983
- Scott Baker, P, 2015
- Tom Baker, P, 1935–1937
- Paul Bako, C, 2005
- James Baldwin, P, 2001
- Lady Baldwin, P, 1890
- Win Ballou, P, 1929
- **Dave Bancroft**, SS, 1928–1929
- Anthony Banda, P, 2024–2025
- Dan Bankhead, P, 1947, 1950–1951
- Willie Banks, P, 1995
- Jack Banta, P, 1947–1950
- Rod Barajas, C, 2010–2011
- Turner Barber, OF, 1923
- Jim Barbieri, OF, 1966
- Cy Barger, P, 1910–1912
- Red Barkley, IF, 1943
- Austin Barnes, C/IF, 2015–2025
- Brian Barnes, P, 1994
- Charlie Barnes, P, 2026
- Jesse Barnes, P, 1926–1927
- Larry Barnes, 1B, 2003
- Darwin Barney, IF, 2014–2015
- Rex Barney, P, 1943, 1946–1950
- Bob Barr, P, 1935
- Bob Barrett, 3B, 1925, 1927
- Manuel Barrios, P, 1998
- Boyd Bartley, SS, 1943
- Al Bashang, OF, 1918
- Eddie Basinski, IF, 1944–1945
- Emil Batch, 3B/OF, 1904–1907
- Trevor Bauer, P, 2021
- Jim Baxes, 3B, 1959
- Mike Baxter, OF, 2014
- Brandon Beachy, P, 2015
- Billy Bean, OF, 1989
- Matt Beaty, 1B/OF, 2019–2021
- Boom-Boom Beck, P, 1933–1934
- Erve Beck, 2B, 1899
- Josh Beckett, P, 2012–2014
- Joe Beckwith, P, 1979–1980, 1982–1983, 1986
- Hank Behrman, P, 1946–1948
- Joe Beimel P, 2006–2008
- Kevin Beirne, P, 2002
- Mark Belanger, SS, 1982
- Wayne Belardi, 1B, 1950–1951, 1953–1954
- Tim Belcher, P, 1987–1991
- Ronald Belisario, P, 2009–2010, 2012–2013
- Frank Bell, C/OF, 1885
- George Bell, P, 1907–1911
- Ronnie Belliard, IF, 2009–2010
- Cody Bellinger, 1B/OF, 2017–2022
- **Adrián Beltré**, 3B, 1998–2004
- Ray Benge, P, 1933–1935
- Ike Benners, OF, 1884
- Gary Bennett, C, 2008
- Todd Benzinger, 1B/OF, 1992
- Moe Berg, C, 1923
- Bill Bergen, C, 1904–1911
- Roger Bernadina, OF, 2014
- Ray Berres, C, 1934, 1936
- Ángel Berroa, SS, 2008
- Gerónimo Berroa, OF, 2000
- Don Bessent, P, 1955–1958
- Wilson Betemit, 3B, 2006–2007
- Mookie Betts, IF/OF, 2020–2026
- Phil Bickford, P, 2021–2023
- Cavan Biggio, IF, 2024
- Steve Bilko, 1B, 1958
- Jack Billingham, P, 1968
- Chad Billingsley, P, 2006–2013
- Ralph Birkofer, P, 1937
- Babe Birrer, P, 1958
- Del Bissonette, 1B, 1928–1931, 1933
- Joe Black, P, 1952–1955
- Casey Blake, 3B, 2008–2011
- Henry Blanco, C, 1997
- Joe Blanton, P, 2012, 2016
- Clarence Blethen, P, 1929
- Mike Blowers, 3B, 1996
- Lu Blue, 1B, 1933
- Hiram Bocachica, IF/OF, 2000–2002
- Doug Bochtler, P, 1999
- George Boehler, P, 1926
- Tim Bogar, IF, 2001
- Brian Bohanon, P, 1998
- Sam Bohne, 2B, 1926
- Jack Bolling, 1B, 1944
- Mike Bolsinger, P, 2015–2016
- Bobby Bonilla, 3B/OF, 1998
- Frank Bonner, 2B, 1896
- Ike Boone, OF, 1930–1932
- Pedro Borbón Jr., P, 1999
- Frenchy Bordagaray, IF/OF, 1935–1936, 1942–1945
- Bob Borkowski, OF, 1955
- Rafael Bournigal, IF, 1992–1994
- Ken Boyer, 3B, 1968–1969
- Buzz Boyle, OF, 1933–1935
- Gibby Brack, OF, 1937–1938
- Mark Bradley, OF, 1981–1982
- Milton Bradley, OF, 2004–2005
- Joe Bradshaw, P, 1929
- Bobby Bragan, SS, 1943–1944, 1947–1948
- Ralph Branca, P, 1944–1953, 1956
- Ed Brandt, P, 1936
- Jeff Branson, IF, 2000–2001
- Ryan Brasier, P, 2023–2024
- Yhency Brazobán, P, 2004–2008
- Sid Bream, 1B, 1983–1985
- Marv Breeding, 1B, 1963
- Tom Brennan, P, 1985
- William Brennan, P, 1988
- Rube Bressler, OF, 1928–1931
- Ken Brett, P, 1979
- Jim Brewer, P, 1964–1975
- Tony Brewer, OF, 1984
- Rocky Bridges, IF, 1951–1952
- Greg Brock, 1B, 1982–1986
- Matt Broderick, 2B, 1903
- Connor Brogdon, P, 2024
- Troy Brohawn, P, 2003
- Hubie Brooks, OF, 1990
- Jerry Brooks, OF, 1993
- **Dan Brouthers**, 1B, 1892–1893
- Eddie Brown, OF, 1924–1925
- Elmer Brown, P, 1913–1915
- John Brown, P, 1897
- Kevin Brown, P, 1999–2003
- Lindsay Brown, SS, 1937
- Lloyd Brown, P, 1925
- Mace Brown, P, 1941
- Tommy Brown, IF/OF, 1944–1945, 1947–1951
- George Browne, OF, 1911
- Pete Browning, OF, 1894
- Jonathan Broxton, P, 2005–2011
- Bruce Brubaker, P, 1967
- Justin Bruihl, P, 2021–2023
- Jacob Brumfield, OF, 1999
- Will Brunson, P, 1998
- Jim Bruske, P, 1995–1996, 1998
- Ralph Bryant, OF, 1985–1987
- Kris Bubic, P, 2026
- Jim Bucher, 3B, 1934–1937
- Bill Buckner, 1B/OF, 1969–1976
- Walker Buehler, P, 2017–2022, 2024
- Cy Buker, P, 1945
- **Jim Bunning**, P, 1969
- Al Burch, OF, 1907–1911
- Ernie Burch, OF, 1886–1887
- Jack Burdock, 2B, 1888, 1891
- Sandy Burk, P, 1910–1912
- Glenn Burke, OF, 1976–1978
- Jeromy Burnitz, OF, 2003
- Andy Burns, IF, 2021
- Oyster Burns, OF, 1888–1895
- Buster Burrell, C, 1895–1897
- Larry Burright, 2B, 1962
- Michael Busch, IF, 2023
- Mike Busch, 3B, 1995–1996
- Doc Bushong, C, 1888–1890
- Nick Buss, OF, 2013
- Max Butcher, P, 1936–1938
- Drew Butera, C, 2013–2014
- Brett Butler, OF, 1991–1997
- John Butler, C, 1906–1907
- Johnny Butler, SS, 1926–1927

== C ==
- Enos Cabell, IF/OF, 1985–1986
- Jolbert Cabrera, IF/OF, 2002–2003
- Leon Cadore, P, 1915–1923
- Bruce Caldwell, 1B/OF, 1932
- Alex Call, OF, 2025–2026
- Leo Callahan, OF, 1913
- Alberto Callaspo, IF, 2015
- Dick Calmus, P, 1963
- Dolph Camilli, 1B, 1938–1943
- Doug Camilli, C, 1960–1964
- **Roy Campanella**, C, 1948–1957
- Al Campanis, 2B, 1943
- Jim Campanis, C, 1966–1968
- Gilly Campbell, C, 1938
- Jim Canavan, 2B, 1897
- John Candelaria, P, 1991–1992
- Tom Candiotti, P, 1992–1997
- Chris Cannizzaro, C, 1972–1973
- Guy Cantrell, P, 1925, 1927
- Ben Cantwell, P, 1937
- Chris Capuano, P, 2012–2013
- Andy Carey, 3B, 1962
- **Max Carey**, OF, 1926–1929
- Tex Carleton, P, 1940
- Buddy Carlyle, P, 2005
- Giovanni Carrara, P, 2001–2002, 2004–2006
- Jamey Carroll, IF, 2010–2011
- Ownie Carroll, P, 1933–1934
- Kid Carsey, P, 1901
- **Gary Carter**, C, 1991
- Lance Carter, P, 2006
- Bob Caruthers, P/OF, 1888–1891
- Doc Casey, 3B, 1899–1900, 1906–1907
- Hugh Casey, P, 1939–1942, 1946–1948
- Ben Casparius, P, 2024–2026
- John Cassidy, OF, 1884–1885
- Pete Cassidy, 1B, 1899
- Alex Castellanos, OF, 2012–2013
- Bobby Castillo, P, 1977–1981, 1985
- Fabio Castillo, P, 2017
- Juan Castro, IF, 1995–1999, 2009–2011
- Tom Catterson, OF, 1908–1909
- César Cedeño, OF, 1986
- Roger Cedeño, OF, 1995–1998
- Ron Cey, 3B, 1971–1982
- Ed Chandler, P, 1947
- Ben Chapman, OF, 1944–1945
- Glenn Chapman, OF, 1934
- J. T. Chargois, P, 2018–2019
- Jesse Chavez, P, 2016
- Robinson Checo, P, 1999
- Chin-Feng Chen, OF, 2002–2005
- Larry Cheney, P, 1915–1919
- Paul Chervinko, C, 1937–1938
- Bob Chipman, P, 1941–1944
- Randy Choate, P, 2012
- Hee-seop Choi, 1B, 2004–2005
- McKay Christensen, OF, 2001
- Mike Christopher, P, 1991
- Chuck Churn, P, 1959
- Gino Cimoli, OF, 1956–1958
- Tony Cingrani, P, 2017–2018
- George Cisar, OF, 1937
- Moose Clabaugh, OF, 1926
- Bud Clancy, 1B, 1932
- Bob Clark, C/OF, 1886–1890
- Brady Clark, OF, 2007
- Dave Clark, OF, 1996
- Watty Clark, P, 1927–1937
- Garrett Cleavinger, P, 2021–2022
- Wally Clement, OF, 1909
- Brad Clontz, P, 1998
- Todd Coffey, P, 2012
- Alta Cohen, OF, 1931–1932
- Rocky Colavito, OF, 1968
- Louis Coleman, P 2016
- Bill Collins, OF, 1913
- Hub Collins, 2B/OF, 1888–1892
- Jackie Collum, P, 1957–1958
- Steve Colyer, P, 2003
- Michael Conforto, OF, 2025
- Chuck Connors, 1B, 1949
- Jim Conway, P, 1884
- Dennis Cook, P, 1990–1991
- Brent Cookson, OF, 1999
- Jack Coombs, P, 1915–1918
- Ron Coomer, 1B/3B, 2003
- Johnny Cooney, OF, 1935–1937, 1943–1944
- Alex Cora, IF, 1998–2004
- Claude Corbitt, IF, 1945
- Daniel Corcino, P, 2018
- Jack Corcoran, C, 1884
- Tommy Corcoran, SS, 1892–1896
- Bryan Corey, P, 2002
- Chuck Corgan, IF, 1925, 1927
- Pop Corkhill, OF, 1888–1890
- Lance Cormier, P, 2011
- Kevin Correia, P, 2014
- John Corriden, PR, 1946
- Pete Coscarart, IF, 1938–1941
- Daniel Coulombe, P, 2014–2015
- Bob Coulson, OF, 1910–1911
- Craig Counsell, IF, 1999
- Dylan Covey, P, 2023
- Wes Covington, OF, 1966
- Billy Cox, 3B, 1948–1954
- Dick Cox, OF, 1925–1926
- George Crable, P, 1910
- Roger Craig, P, 1955–1961
- Ed Crane, P/OF, 1893
- Sam Crane, SS, 1922
- Carl Crawford, OF, 2013–2016
- Willie Crawford, OF, 1964–1975
- Tim Crews, P, 1987–1992
- Nabil Crismatt, P, 2024
- Claude Crocker, P, 1944–1945
- Tripp Cromer, IF, 1997–1999
- Jack Cronin, P, 1895, 1904
- Bubba Crosby, OF, 2003
- Lave Cross, 3B, 1900
- Bill Crouch, P, 1939
- Don Crow, C, 1982
- Henry Cruz, OF, 1975–1976
- José Cruz Jr., OF, 2005–2006
- Luis Cruz, IF, 2012–2013
- Tony Cuccinello, 2B, 1932–1935
- Charlie Culberson, IF, 2016–2017
- Roy Cullenbine, OF, 1940
- Nick Cullop, OF, 1929
- George Culver, P, 1973
- John Cummings, P, 1995–1996
- Bert Cunningham, P, 1887
- Chad Curtis, OF, 1996
- Cliff Curtis, P, 1912–1913
- George Cutshaw, 2B, 1912–1917
- **Kiki Cuyler**, OF, 1938
- Tyler Cyr, P, 2023

== D ==
- Omar Daal, P, 1993–1995, 2002
- Bill Dahlen, SS, 1899–1903, 1910–1911
- Babe Dahlgren, 1B, 1942
- Con Daily, C, 1891–1895
- Jud Daley, OF, 1911–1912
- Jack Dalton, OF, 1910, 1914
- Tom Daly, C/2B, 1891–1901
- Jake Daniel, 1B, 1937
- Kal Daniels, OF, 1989–1992
- Fats Dantonio, C, 1944–1945
- Cliff Dapper, C, 1942
- Travis d'Arnaud, PH, 2019
- Bob Darnell, P, 1954, 1956
- Yu Darvish, P, 2017
- Bobby Darwin, OF, 1969, 1971
- Dan Daub, P, 1893–1897
- Jake Daubert, 1B, 1910–1918
- Vic Davalillo, OF, 1977–1980
- Bill Davidson, OF, 1910–1911
- Butch Davis, OF, 1991
- Curt Davis, P, 1940–1946
- Eric Davis, OF, 1992–1993
- Lefty Davis, OF, 1901
- Mike Davis, OF, 1988–1989
- Noah Davis, P, 2025
- Otis Davis, OF, 1946
- Ron Davis, P, 1987
- Tommy Davis, OF, 1959–1966
- Willie Davis, OF, 1960–1973
- Pea Ridge Day, P, 1931
- Grant Dayton, P, 2016–2017
- Rubby De La Rosa, P, 2011–2012
- José De León, P, 2016
- Josue De Paula, OF, 2026
- Lindsay Deal, OF, 1939
- Justin Dean, OF, 2025
- Tommy Dean, SS, 1967
- Hank DeBerry, OF, 1922–1930
- Art Decatur, P, 1922–1925
- Artie Dede, C, 1916
- Rod Dedeaux, SS, 1935
- Pat Deisel, C, 1902
- Iván DeJesús, SS, 1974–1976
- Iván DeJesús Jr., IF, 2011–2012
- Wheezer Dell, P, 1915–1917
- Bert Delmas, 2B, 1933
- Jonny DeLuca, OF, 2023
- Don Demeter, OF, 1956, 1958–1961
- Gene DeMontreville, IF, 1900
- Rick Dempsey, C, 1988–1990
- Eddie Dent, P, 1909, 1911–1912
- Delino DeShields, 2B, 1994–1996
- John DeSilva, P, 1993
- Rube Dessau, P, 1910
- Elmer Dessens, P, 2004–2006
- Mike Devereaux, OF, 1987–1988, 1998
- Blake DeWitt, 2B/3B, 2008–2010
- Alexis Díaz, P, 2025
- Carlos Díaz, P, 1984–1986
- Edwin Díaz, P, 2026
- Einar Díaz, C, 2006
- Leo Dickerman, P, 1923–1924
- O'Koyea Dickson, OF, 2017
- Dick Dietz, C, 1972
- Pop Dillon, 1B, 1904
- Bill Doak, P, 1924, 1927–1928
- John Dobbs, OF, 1903–1905
- George Dockins, P, 1947
- Cozy Dolan, OF, 1901–1902
- José Dominguez, P, 2013–2014
- Chris Donnels, 3B, 2000–2001
- Bill Donovan, P, 1899–1902
- Patsy Donovan, OF, 1890, 1906–1907
- Mickey Doolan, SS, 1918
- Jerry Dorgan, C/OF, 1884
- Jack Doscher, P, 1903–1906
- Octavio Dotel, P, 2010
- John Douglas, 1B, 1945
- Phil Douglas, P, 1915
- Snooks Dowd, IF, 1926
- Red Downey, OF, 1909
- Al Downing, P, 1971–1977
- Red Downs, 2B, 1912
- Carl Doyle, P, 1939–1940
- Jack Doyle, 1B, 1903–1904
- Brian Dozier, IF, 2018
- Solly Drake, OF, 1959
- Tom Drake, P, 1941
- Darren Dreifort, P, 1994, 1996–2001, 2003–2004
- J. D. Drew, OF, 2005–2006
- Jack Dreyer, P, 2025–2026
- **Don Drysdale**, P, 1956–1969
- Clise Dudley, P, 1929–1930
- John Duffie, P, 1967
- Mariano Duncan, 2B, 1985–1987, 1989
- Jack Dunn, P/3B, 1897–1900
- Joe Dunn, C, 1908–1909
- Bull Durham, P, 1904
- Rich Durning, P, 1917–1918
- **Leo Durocher**, SS, 1938–1941, 1943, 1945
- Red Durrett, OF, 1944–1945

== E ==
- Billy Earle, C, 1894
- George Earnshaw, P, 1935–1936
- Mal Eason, P, 1905–1906
- Eddie Eayrs, OF, 1921
- Ox Eckhardt, OF, 1936
- Jake Eder, P, 2026
- Tommy Edman, IF/OF, 2024–2026
- Bruce Edwards, C, 1946–1951
- Hank Edwards, OF, 1951
- Mike Edwards, 3B, 2005
- Dick Egan, 2B, 1914–1915
- Dick Egan, P, 1967
- Rube Ehrhardt, P, 1924–1928
- Brett Eibner, OF, 2017
- Joey Eischen, P, 1995–1996
- Jim Eisenreich, OF, 1998
- Harry Eisenstat, P, 1935–1937
- Kid Elberfeld, SS, 1914
- Scott Elbert, P, 2008–2012, 2014
- Jumbo Elliott, P, 1925, 1927–1930
- Rowdy Elliott, C, 1920
- A. J. Ellis, C, 2008–2016
- Mark Ellis, 2B, 2012–2013
- Robert Ellis, P, 2002
- Kevin Elster, SS, 2000
- Don Elston, P, 1957
- Bones Ely, SS, 1891
- John Ely, P, 2010–2012
- Juan Encarnación, OF, 2004
- Gil English, 3B, 1944
- Woody English, IF, 1937–1938
- Johnny Enzmann, P, 1914
- Nathan Eovaldi, P, 2011–2012
- Al Epperly, P, 1950
- Scott Erickson, P, 2005
- Robbie Erlin, P, 2022
- Carl Erskine, P, 1948–1959
- Tex Erwin, C, 1910–1914
- Santiago Espinal, IF, 2026
- Cecil Espy, OF, 1983
- Chuck Essegian, OF, 1959–1960
- Dude Esterbrook, 3B, 1891
- Andre Ethier, OF, 2006–2017
- Red Evans, P, 1939
- Roy Evans, P, 1902–1903
- Dana Eveland, P, 2011

== F ==
- Bunny Fabrique, SS, 1916–1917
- Jim Fairey, OF, 1968, 1973
- Ron Fairly, 1B/OF, 1958–1969
- Brian Falkenborg, P, 2004, 2008
- George Fallon, IF, 1937
- Alex Farmer, C, 1908
- Kyle Farmer, C/IF, 2017–2018
- Duke Farrell, C, 1899–1902
- Turk Farrell, P, 1961
- John Farrow, C, 1884
- Jim Faulkner, P, 1930
- Tim Federowicz, C, 2011–2014
- Hunter Feduccia, C, 2024–2026
- Gus Felix, OF, 1926–1927
- Neftalí Feliz, P, 2021
- Alex Ferguson, P, 1929
- Caleb Ferguson, P, 2018–2020, 2022–2023
- Joe Ferguson, C/OF, 1970–1976, 1978–1981
- Chico Fernández, SS, 1956
- Julián Fernández, P, 2025
- Sid Fernández, P, 1983
- Al Ferrara, OF, 1963, 1965–1968
- Wes Ferrell, P, 1940
- Lou Fette, P, 1940
- Mike Fetters, P, 2000–2001
- Chick Fewster, 2B, 1926–1927
- J. P. Feyereisen, P, 2024–2025
- Josh Fields, P, 2016–2018
- Casey Fien, P, 2016
- Stephen Fife, P, 2012–2014
- Chone Figgins, IF/OF, 2014
- Jack Fimple, C, 1983–1984, 1986
- Pembroke Finlayson, P, 1908–1909
- Steve Finley, OF, 2004
- Neal Finn, 2B, 1930–1932
- Jeff Fischer, P, 1989
- William Fischer, C, 1913–1914
- Bob Fisher, SS, 1912–1913
- Chauncey Fisher, P, 1897
- Freddie Fitzsimmons, P, 1937–1943
- Tom Fitzsimmons, 3B, 1919
- Jack Flaherty, P, 2024
- Darrin Fletcher, C, 1989–1990
- Sam Fletcher, P, 1909
- Tim Flood, 2B, 1902–1903
- José Flores, IF, 2004
- Dylan Floro, P, 2018–2020
- Jake Flowers, IF, 1927–1931, 1933
- Wes Flowers, P, 1940, 1944
- Wilmer Font, P, 2017–2018
- Chad Fonville, IF/OF, 1995–1997
- Hod Ford, IF, 1925
- Terry Forster, P, 1978–1982
- Logan Forsythe, IF, 2017–2018
- Alan Foster, P, 1967–1970
- Jack Fournier, 1B, 1923–1926
- Dave Foutz, P/1B/OF, 1888–1896
- Art Fowler, P, 1959
- Fred Frankhouse, P, 1936–1938
- Jack Franklin, P, 1944
- Herman Franks, C, 1940–1941
- Johnny Frederick, OF, 1929–1934
- Alex Freeland, IF, 2025–2026
- Freddie Freeman, 1B, 2022–2026
- Mike Freeman, PH, 2017
- David Freese, IF, 2018–2019
- Howard Freigau, 3B, 1928
- Larry French, P, 1941–1942
- Ray French, SS, 1923
- Lonny Frey, IF, 1933–1936
- Carlos Frías, P, 2014–2016
- Pepe Frías, SS, 1980–1981
- Charlie Fuchs, P, 1944
- Nig Fuller, C, 1902
- Rafael Furcal, SS, 2006–2011
- Carl Furillo, OF, 1946–1960

== G ==
- Len Gabrielson, OF, 1967–1970
- John Gaddy, P, 1938
- Éric Gagné, P, 1999–2006
- Greg Gagne, SS, 1996–1997
- Augie Galan, OF, 1941–1946
- Rocky Gale, C, 2018–2019
- Joe Gallagher, OF, 1940
- Phil Gallivan, P, 1931
- Joey Gallo, OF, 2022
- Balvino Gálvez, P, 1986
- Karim García, OF, 1995–1997
- Luis García, P, 2025
- Onelki García, P, 2013
- Yimi García, P, 2014–2016, 2018–2019
- Nomar Garciaparra, IF, 2006–2008
- Jon Garland, P, 2009, 2011
- Kyle Garlick, OF, 2019
- Mike Garman, P, 1977–1978
- Phil Garner, IF, 1987
- Steve Garvey, 1B, 1969–1982
- Ned Garvin, P, 1902–1904
- Welcome Gaston, P, 1898–1899
- Frank Gatins, 3B, 1901
- Sid Gautreaux, C, 1936–1937
- Billy Geer, SS, 1884
- Jim Gentile, 1B, 1957–1958
- Greek George, C, 1938
- Ben Geraghty, IF, 1936
- Paul Gervase, P, 2025–2026
- Doc Gessler, OF, 1903–1906
- Gus Getz, 3B, 1914–1916
- Bob Giallombardo, P, 1958
- Jay Gibbons, 1B/OF, 2010–2011
- Kirk Gibson, OF, 1988–1990
- Charlie Gilbert, OF, 1940
- Pete Gilbert, 3B, 1894
- Shawn Gilbert, IF/OF, 2000
- Wally Gilbert, 3B, 1928–1931
- Carden Gillenwater, OF, 1943
- Jim Gilliam, IF, 1953–1966
- Héctor Giménez, C, 2011
- Al Gionfriddo, OF, 1947
- Tony Giuliani, C, 1940–1941
- Tyler Glasnow, P, 2024–2026
- Roy Gleason, OF, 1963
- Al Glossop, 2B, 1943
- John Gochnauer, SS, 1901
- Erik Goeddel, P, 2018
- Jim Golden, P, 1960–1961
- Dave Goltz, P, 1980–1982
- Yoendrys Gómez, P, 2025
- Tony Gonsolin, P, 2019–2023, 2025
- Adrián González, 1B, 2012–2017
- José González, OF, 1985–1991
- Luis González, OF, 2007
- Victor González, P, 2020–2021, 2023
- Johnny Gooch, C, 1928–1929
- Ed Goodson, 1B/3B, 1976–1977
- Tom Goodwin, OF, 1991–1993, 2000–2001
- Ray Gordinier, P, 1921–1922
- Dee Gordon, SS, 2011–2014
- Terrance Gore, OF, 2020
- Rick Gorecki, P, 1997
- Jim Gott, P, 1990–1994
- Billy Grabarkewitz, IF, 1969–1972
- Jason Grabowski, OF, 2004–2005
- Jack Graham, 1B, 1946
- Yasmani Grandal, C, 2015–2018
- Curtis Granderson, OF, 2017
- Mudcat Grant, P, 1968
- Brusdar Graterol, P, 2020–2024
- Dick Gray, 3B, 1958–1959
- Josiah Gray, P, 2021
- Harvey Green, P, 1935
- Nick Green, IF, 2010
- Shawn Green, OF, 2000–2004
- Conner Greene, P, 2021
- Nelson Greene, P, 1924–1925
- Shane Greene, P, 2021–2022
- Kent Greenfield, P, 1929
- Bill Greenwood, 2B, 1884
- Ed Greer, OF, 1887
- Hal Gregg, P, 1943–1947
- Zack Greinke, P, 2013–2015
- Alfredo Griffin, SS, 1988–1991
- Mike Griffin, OF, 1891–1898
- Bert Griffith, OF, 1922–1923
- Derrell Griffith, 3B/OF, 1963–1966
- Tommy Griffith, OF, 1919–1925
- John Grim, C, 1895–1899
- **Burleigh Grimes**, P, 1918–1926
- Dan Griner, P, 1918
- Lee Grissom, P, 1940–1941
- Marquis Grissom, OF, 2001–2002
- Kevin Gross, P, 1991–1994
- Kip Gross, P, 1992–1993
- Jerry Grote, C, 1977–1978, 1981
- Michael Grove, P, 2022–2024
- Mark Grudzielanek, IF, 1998–2002
- Javy Guerra, P, 2011–2013
- Alex Guerrero, IF/OF, 2014–2015
- Pedro Guerrero, IF/OF, 1978–1988
- Wilton Guerrero, 2B, 1996–1998
- Matt Guerrier, P, 2011–2013
- Brad Gulden, C, 1978
- Ad Gumbert, P, 1895–1896
- Mark Guthrie, P, 1995–1998
- Franklin Gutiérrez, OF, 2017
- Joel Guzmán, IF, 2006
- Chris Gwynn, OF, 1987–1991, 1994–1995
- Tony Gwynn Jr., OF, 2011–2012
- Jedd Gyorko, IF, 2019

== H ==
- Bert Haas, 1B, 1937–1938
- George Haddock, P, 1892–1893
- Charlie Haeger, P, 2009–2010
- Jerry Hairston Jr., IF/OF, 2012–2013
- Chip Hale, IF, 1997
- John Hale, OF, 1974–1977
- Bill Hall, P, 1913
- Bob Hall, IF/OF, 1905
- Darren Hall, P, 1996–1998
- John Hall, P, 1948
- Toby Hall, C, 2006
- Tom Haller, C, 1968–1971
- Bill Hallman, 2B, 1898
- Seth Halvorsen, P, 2026
- Jeff Hamilton, 3B, 1986–1991
- Luke Hamlin, P, 1937–1941
- Bert Hamric, PH, 1955
- Tim Hamulack, P, 2006
- Gerry Hannahs, P, 1978–1979
- Pat Hannivan, 2B/OF, 1897
- Greg Hansell, P, 1995
- Dave Hansen, 3B, 1990–1996, 1999–2002
- Frank Hansford, P, 1898
- Aaron Harang, P, 2012
- Dan Haren, P, 2014
- Charlie Hargreaves, C, 1923–1928
- Mike Harkey, P, 1997
- John Harkins, P, 1885–1887
- Tim Harkness, 1B, 1961–1962
- George Harper, P, 1896
- Harry Harper, P, 1923
- Bill Harris, P, 1957, 1959
- Joe Harris, 1B, 1928
- Lenny Harris, IF, 1989–1993
- Bill Hart, P, 1892
- Bill Hart, IF, 1943–1945
- Chris Hartje, C, 1939
- Mike Hartley, P, 1989–1991
- Buddy Hassett, 1B, 1936–1938
- Chris Hatcher, P, 2015–2017
- Mickey Hatcher, IF/OF, 1979–1980, 1987–1990
- Gil Hatfield, 3B/SS, 1893
- Ray Hathaway, P, 1945
- Joe Hatten, P, 1946–1951
- Chris Haughey, P, 1943
- Phil Haugstad, P, 1947–1948, 1951
- Brad Havens, P, 1987–1988
- Blake Hawksworth, P, 2011
- Jackie Hayes, C, 1884–1885
- Ray Hayworth, C, 1938–1939, 1944–1945
- Ed Head, P, 1940, 1942–1944, 1946
- Andrew Heaney, P, 2022, 2025
- Hughie Hearne, C, 1901–1903
- Mike Hechinger, C, 1912–1913
- Danny Heep, OF, 1987–1988
- Jake Hehl, P, 1918
- Fred Heimach, P, 1930–1933
- Chris Heisey, OF, 2015
- Harry Heitmann, P, 1918
- Heath Hembree, P, 2022
- George Hemming, P, 1891
- Hardie Henderson, P, 1886–1887
- **Rickey Henderson**, OF, 2003
- Harvey Hendrick, IF/OF, 1927–1931
- Mark Hendrickson, P, 2006–2007
- Lafayette Henion, P, 1919
- Weldon Henley, P, 1907
- Butch Henline, C, 1927–1929
- Edgardo Henriquez, P, 2024–2026
- Dutch Henry, P, 1923–1924
- Roy Henshaw, P, 1937
- Matt Herges, P, 1999–2001
- Babe Herman, OF, 1926–1931, 1945
- **Billy Herman**, 2B, 1941–1943, 1946
- Chad Hermansen, OF, 2003
- Gene Hermanski, OF, 1943, 1946–1951
- Carlos Hernández, C, 1990–1996
- Elieser Hernández, P, 2024
- Enzo Hernández, SS, 1978
- José Hernández, IF, 2004
- Kiké Hernández, IF/OF, 2015–2020, 2023–2026
- Jonathan Hernández, P, 2026
- Ramón Hernández, C, 2013
- Roberto Hernández, P, 2014
- Roberto Hernández, P, 2007
- Teoscar Hernández, OF, 2024–2026
- Yonny Hernández, IF, 2023
- Elián Herrera, IF/OF, 2012–2013
- Art Herring, P, 1934, 1944–1946
- Marty Herrmann, P, 1918
- Orel Hershiser, P, 1983–1994, 2000
- Greg Heydeman, P, 1973
- Jason Heyward, OF, 2023–2024
- Phil Hiatt, 3B, 2001
- Jim Hickman, OF, 1916–1919
- Jim Hickman, OF, 1967
- Kirby Higbe, P, 1941–1943, 1946–1947
- Bob Higgins, C, 1911–1912
- Andy High, 3B, 1922–1925
- George Hildebrand, OF, 1902
- Bill Hill, P, 1899
- Koyie Hill, C, 2003
- Rich Hill, P, 2016–2018
- Shawn Hillegas, P, 1987–1988
- Shea Hillenbrand, 1B/3B, 2007
- Hunkey Hines, OF, 1895
- Mike Hines, C, 1885
- Don Hoak, 3B, 1954–1955
- Oris Hockett, OF, 1938–1939
- **Gil Hodges**, 1B, 1943, 1947–1961
- Glenn Hoffman, SS, 1987
- Jamie Hoffmann, OF, 2009, 2011
- Bert Hogg, 3B, 1934
- Bill Holbert, C, 1888
- Todd Hollandsworth, OF, 1995–2000
- Al Hollingsworth, P, 1939
- Bonnie Hollingsworth, P, 1924
- Damon Hollins, OF, 1998
- Darren Holmes, P, 1990
- Jim Holmes, P, 1908
- Tommy Holmes, OF, 1952
- Brian Holton, P, 1985–1988
- Rick Honeycutt, P, 1983–1987
- Brent Honeywell Jr., P, 2024
- Wally Hood, OF, 1920–1922
- Burt Hooton, P, 1975–1984
- Gail Hopkins, 1B, 1974
- Johnny Hopp, 1B/OF, 1949
- Lefty Hopper, P, 1898
- Elmer Horton, P, 1898
- Ricky Horton, P, 1988–1989
- Pete Hotaling, OF, 1885
- Charlie Hough, P, 1970–1980
- D.J. Houlton, P, 2005, 2007
- Charlie Householder, C/1B, 1884
- Ed Householder, OF, 1903
- Tyler Houston, IF, 2002
- Frank Howard, OF, 1958–1964
- Thomas Howard, OF, 1998
- Steve Howe, P, 1980–1983, 1985
- Dixie Howell, C, 1953, 1955–1956
- Harry Howell, P, 1898, 1900
- J. P. Howell, P, 2013–2016
- Jay Howell, P, 1988–1992
- Ken Howell, P, 1984–1988
- **Waite Hoyt**, P, 1932, 1937–1938
- Chin-Lung Hu, IF, 2007–2010
- Trenidad Hubbard, OF, 1998–1999
- Bill Hubbell, P, 1925
- Bryan Hudson, P, 2023
- Daniel Hudson, P, 2018, 2022–2024
- Johnny Hudson, IF, 1936–1940
- Orlando Hudson, 2B, 2009
- Rex Hudson, P, 1974
- David Huff, P, 2015
- Mike Huff, OF, 1989
- Ed Hug, C, 1903
- Jay Hughes, P, 1899, 1901–1902
- Jim Hughes, P, 1952–1956
- Mickey Hughes, P, 1888–1890
- Eric Hull, P, 2007
- John Hummel, IF/OF, 1905–1915
- Al Humphrey, OF, 1911
- Todd Hundley, C, 1999–2000, 2003
- Bernie Hungling, C, 1922–1923
- Ron Hunt, 2B, 1967
- George Hunter, P/OF, 1909–1910
- Willard Hunter, P, 1962
- Jerry Hurley, C, 1907
- Kyle Hurt, P, 2023–2024, 2026
- Joe Hutcheson, OF, 1933
- Ira Hutchinson, P, 1939
- Roy Hutson, OF, 1925
- Tommy Hutton, 1B/OF, 1966, 1969

== I ==
- Garey Ingram, IF, 1994–1995, 1997
- Bert Inks, P, 1891–1892
- Cole Irvin, P, 2026
- Charlie Irwin, 3B, 1901–1902
- Kazuhisa Ishii, P, 2002–2004
- César Izturis, SS, 2002–2006

== J ==
- Fred Jacklitsch, C, 1903–1904
- Andre Jackson, P, 2021–2023
- Edwin Jackson, P, 2003–2005
- Randy Jackson, 3B, 1956–1958
- Merwin Jacobson, OF, 1926–1927
- Cleo James, OF, 1968
- Kenley Jansen, P, 2010–2021
- Hal Janvrin, OF, 1921–1922
- Roy Jarvis, C, 1944
- Stan Javier, OF, 1990–1992
- George Jeffcoat, P, 1936–1937, 1939
- Jack Jenkins, P, 1969
- **Hughie Jennings**, IF, 1899–1900, 1903
- Tommy John, P, 1972–1974, 1976–1978
- Brian Johnson, C, 2001
- Charles Johnson, C, 1998
- Jason Johnson, P, 2008
- Jim Johnson, P, 2015
- Lou Johnson, OF, 1965–1967
- Micah Johnson, IF, 2016
- Reed Johnson, OF, 2010
- Fred Johnston, IF, 1924
- Jimmy Johnston, 3B/OF, 1916–1925
- Jay Johnstone, OF, 1980–1982, 1985
- **Andruw Jones**, OF, 2008
- Art Jones, P, 1932
- Binky Jones, SS, 1924
- Charlie Jones, IF, 1884
- Fielder Jones, OF, 1896–1900
- Mitch Jones, OF, 2009
- Nate Jones, P, 2021
- Oscar Jones, P, 1903–1905
- Brian Jordan, OF, 2002–2003
- Dutch Jordan, 2B, 1903–1904
- Jimmy Jordan, IF, 1933–1936
- Tim Jordan, 1B, 1906–1910
- Spider Jorgensen, 3B, 1947–1950
- Von Joshua, OF, 1969–1974, 1979
- Bill Joyce, 3B, 1892
- Mike Judd, P, 1997–2000
- Joe Judge, 1B, 1933

== K ==
- Tommy Kahnle, P, 2022
- Alex Kampouris, 2B, 1941–1943
- Eric Karros, 1B, 1991–2002
- John Karst, 3B, 1915
- Scott Kazmir, P, 2016
- Willie Keeler, OF, 1893, 1899–1902
- Chet Kehn, P, 1942
- Mike Kekich, P, 1965, 1968
- John Kelleher, 3B, 1916
- Frank Kellert, 1B, 1955
- **Joe Kelley**, OF, 1899–1901
- **George Kelly**, 1B, 1932
- Joe Kelly, P, 2019–2021, 2023–2024
- Roberto Kelly, OF, 1995
- Matt Kemp, OF, 2006–2014, 2018
- Howie Kendrick, IF/OF, 2015–2016
- Adam Kennedy, IF, 2012
- Bob Kennedy, 3B/OF, 1957
- Brickyard Kennedy, P, 1892–1901
- Buddy Kennedy, 3B, 2025
- Ed Kennedy, OF, 1886
- John Kennedy, IF, 1965–1966
- **Jeff Kent**, 2B, 2005–2008
- Maury Kent, P, 1912–1913
- Clayton Kershaw, P, 2008–2025
- Mike Kickham, P, 2021
- Masao Kida, P, 2003–2004
- Kevin Kiermaier, OF, 2024
- Pete Kilduff, 2B, 1919–1921
- Hyeseong Kim, IF, 2025–2026
- Newt Kimball, P, 1940–1943
- Sam Kimber, P, 1884
- Craig Kimbrel, P, 2022
- Clyde King, P, 1944–1945, 1947–1948, 1951–1952
- Mike Kinkade, IF/OF, 2002–2003
- Tom Kinslow, C, 1891–1894
- Fred Kipp, P, 1957
- Wayne Kirby, OF, 1996–1997
- Enos Kirkpatrick, 3B, 1912–1913
- Frank Kitson, P, 1900–1902
- Will Klein, P, 2025–2026
- Johnny Klippstein, P, 1958–1959
- Joe Klugmann, 2B, 1924
- Elmer Klumpp, C, 1937
- Landon Knack, P, 2024–2026
- Corey Knebel, P, 2021
- Elmer Knetzer, P, 1909–1912
- Hub Knolls, P, 1906
- Jimmy Knowles, IF, 1884
- Barney Koch, 2B, 1944
- Len Koenecke, OF, 1934–1935
- Adam Kolarek, P, 2019–2020, 2023
- Paul Konerko, 1B, 1997–1998
- Ed Konetchy, 1B, 1919–1921
- Michael Kopech, P, 2024–2025
- Jim Korwan, P, 1894
- Andy Kosco, OF, 1969–1970
- **Sandy Koufax**, P, 1955–1966
- Joe Koukalik, P, 1904
- Lou Koupal, P, 1928–1929
- Ernie Koy, OF, 1938–1940
- Chuck Kress, 1B, 1954
- Chad Kreuter, C, 2000–2002
- Bill Krieg, C/1B/OF, 1885
- Bill Krueger, P, 1987–1988
- Ernie Krueger, C, 1917–1921
- Abe Kruger, P, 1908
- Jeff Kubenka, P, 1998–1999
- Hong-Chih Kuo, P, 2005–2011
- Hiroki Kuroda, P, 2008–2011
- Jul Kustus, OF, 1909

== L ==
- Clem Labine, P, 1950–1960
- Candy LaChance, 1B, 1893–1898
- Lee Lacy, OF, 1972–1978
- Lerrin LaGrow, P, 1979
- Frank Lamanske, P, 1935
- Bill Lamar, OF, 1920–1921
- Wayne LaMaster, P, 1938
- Jake Lamb, OF, 2022
- Ray Lamb, P, 1969–1970
- Dinelson Lamet, P, 2024
- Rafael Landestoy, 2B, 1977, 1983–1984
- Ken Landreaux, OF, 1981–1987
- Joe Landrum, P, 1950, 1952
- Tito Landrum, OF, 1987
- Frank Lankford, P, 1998
- Norm Larker, 1B, 1958–1961
- Andy LaRoche, 3B, 2007–2008
- Lyn Lary, SS, 1939
- **Tommy Lasorda**, P, 1954–1955
- Tacks Latimer, C, 1902
- Mat Latos, P, 2015
- Eric Lauer, P, 2026
- Cookie Lavagetto, IF, 1937–1941, 1946–1947
- Rudy Law, OF, 1978, 1980
- Tony Lazzeri, 2B, 1939
- Brent Leach, P. 2009
- Brandon League, P, 2012–2014
- Bill Leard, 2B, 1917
- Tim Leary, P, 1987–1989
- Ricky Ledée, OF, 2005–2006
- Bob Lee, P, 1967
- Hal Lee, OF, 1930
- Leron Lee, OF, 1975–1976
- Zach Lee, P, 2015
- Jim Lefebvre, 2B, 1965–1972
- Ken Lehman, P, 1952, 1956–1957
- Larry LeJeune, OF, 1911
- Don LeJohn, 3B, 1965
- Steve Lembo, C, 1950, 1952
- Ed Lennox, 3B, 1909–1910
- Dutch Leonard, P, 1933–1936
- Jeffrey Leonard, OF, 1977
- Sam Leslie, 1B, 1933–1935
- Dennis Lewallyn, P, 1975–1979
- Darren Lewis, OF, 1997
- Phil Lewis, SS, 1905–1908
- Jim Leyritz, C/1B, 2000
- Adam Liberatore, P, 2015–2018
- Mike Lieberthal, C, 2007
- Bob Lillis, SS, 1958–1961
- Ted Lilly, P, 2010–2013
- José Lima, P, 2004
- Josh Lindblom, P, 2011–2012
- Jim Lindsey, P, 1937
- John Lindsey, 1B, 2010
- **Freddie Lindstrom**, 3B/OF, 1936
- Jon Link, P, 2010
- Nelson Liriano, 2B, 1997
- Jack Little, P, 2025
- Mickey Livingston, C, 1951
- Paul Lo Duca, C, 1998–2004
- Esteban Loaiza, P, 2007–2008
- Tim Locastro, OF, 2017–2018
- Billy Loes, P, 1950, 1952–1956
- Kenny Lofton, OF, 2006
- Dick Loftus, OF, 1924–1925
- Bob Logan, P, 1935
- Zach Logue, P, 2024
- Bill Lohrman, P, 1943–1944
- **Ernie Lombardi**, C, 1931
- Vic Lombardi, P, 1945–1947
- James Loney, 1B, 2006–2012
- Tom Long, P, 1924
- Davey Lopes, 2B, 1972–1981
- **Al López**, C, 1928, 1930–1935
- Luis López, C, 1990
- Mark Loretta, IF, 2009
- Charlie Loudenslager, 2B, 1904
- Ryan Loutos, P, 2025
- Tom Lovett, P, 1889–1891, 1893
- Derek Lowe, P, 2005–2008
- Ray Lucas, P, 1933–1934
- Con Lucid, P, 1894–1895
- Julio Lugo, SS, 2006
- Matt Luke, OF, 1998
- Harry Lumley, OF, 1904–1910
- Don Lund, OF, 1945, 1947–1948
- Dolf Luque, P, 1930–1931
- Gavin Lux, IF/OF, 2019–2022, 2024
- Lance Lynn, P, 2023
- Barry Lyons, C, 1990–1991
- Jim Lyttle, OF, 1976

== M ==
- Mike MacDougal, P, 2011–2012
- Ed MacGamwell, 1B, 1905
- Manny Machado, IF, 2018
- Max Macon, P, 1940, 1942–1943
- **Greg Maddux**, P, 2006, 2008
- Mike Maddux, P, 1990, 1999
- Bill Madlock, 3B, 1985–1987
- Ryan Madson, P, 2018
- Kenta Maeda, P, 2016–2019
- Lee Magee, 2B/OF, 1919
- Matt Magill, P, 2013
- Sal Maglie, P, 1956–1957
- George Magoon, IF, 1898
- Paul Maholm, P, 2014
- Duster Mails, P, 1915–1916
- Charlie Malay, 2B, 1905
- Candy Maldonado, OF, 1981–1985
- Tony Malinosky, IF, 1937
- Mal Mallette, P, 1950
- Lew Malone, IF, 1917, 1919
- Billy Maloney, OF, 1906–1908
- Sean Maloney, P, 1998
- Al Mamaux, P, 1918–1923
- Gus Mancuso, C, 1940
- Charlie Manuel, OF, 1974–1975
- **Heinie Manush**, OF, 1937–1938
- **Rabbit Maranville**, IF, 1926
- **Juan Marichal**, P, 1975
- Jake Marisnick, OF, 2023
- Carlos Mármol, P, 2013
- **Rube Marquard**, P, 1915–1920
- Oreste Marrero, 1B, 1996
- William Marriott, 3B, 1926–1927
- Buck Marrow, P, 1937–1938
- Doc Marshall, C, 1909
- Mike Marshall, 1B/OF, 1981–1989
- Mike Marshall, P, 1974–1976
- Chris Martin, P, 2022
- Morrie Martin, P, 1949
- Russell Martin, C, 2006–2010, 2019
- Tom Martin, P, 2003–2004
- J. D. Martinez, OF, 2023
- **Pedro Martínez**, P, 1992–1993
- Ramón Martínez, IF, 2006–2007
- Ramón Martínez, P, 1988–1998
- Ted Martínez, SS, 1977–1979
- Onan Masaoka, P, 1999–2000
- Earl Mattingly, P, 1931
- Len Matuszek, 1B, 1985–1987
- Gene Mauch, 2B, 1944, 1948
- Al Maul, P, 1899
- Ralph Mauriello, P, 1958
- Carmen Mauro, OF, 1953
- Dustin May, P, 2019–2023, 2025
- Brent Mayne, C, 2004
- Al Mays, P, 1888
- Luis Maza, IF, 2008
- Al McBean, P, 1969–1970
- Bill McCabe, IF/OF, 1920
- Gene McCann, P, 1901–1902
- Bill McCarren, 3B, 1923
- Brandon McCarthy, P, 2015–2017
- Jack McCarthy, OF, 1906–1907
- Johhny McCarthy, 1B, 1934–1935
- **Tommy McCarthy**, OF, 1896
- Lew McCarty, C, 1913–1916
- Jim McCauley, C, 1886
- Bill McClellan, IF, 1885–1888
- Mike McCormick, 3B, 1904
- Mike McCormick, OF, 1949
- Walt McCredie, OF, 1903
- Tom McCreery, OF, 1901–1903
- Chayce McDermott, P, 2026
- Terry McDermott, 1B, 1972
- Danny McDevitt, P, 1957–1960
- James McDonald, P, 2008–2010
- Sandy McDougal, P, 1895
- Roger McDowell, P, 1991–1994
- Pryor McElveen, 3B, 1909–1911
- Dan McFarlan, P, 1899
- Chappie McFarland, P, 1906
- Dan McGann, 1B, 1899
- Jake McGee, P, 2020
- **Joe McGinnity**, P, 1900
- Pat McGlothin, P, 1949–1950
- Bob McGraw, P, 1925–1927
- **Fred McGriff**, 1B, 2003
- Deacon McGuire, C, 1899–1901
- Harry McIntire, P, 1905–1909
- Doc McJames, P, 1899, 1901
- Kit McKenna, P, 1898
- Billy McKinney, OF, 2021
- Zach McKinstry, IF/OF, 2020–2022
- Ed McLane, OF, 1907
- Cal McLish, P, 1944, 1946
- Sadie McMahon, P, 1897
- John McMakin, P, 1902
- Frank McManus, C, 1903
- Greg McMichael, P, 1998
- Tommy McMillan, SS, 1908–1910
- Ken McMullen, 3B, 1962–1964, 1973–1975
- Jim McTamany, OF, 1885–1887
- George McVey, C/1B, 1885
- Doug McWeeny, P, 1926–1929
- **Joe Medwick**, OF, 1940–1943, 1946
- Adam Melhuse, C, 2000
- Jonathan Meloan, P, 2007
- Rube Melton, P, 1943–1944, 1946–1947
- Orlando Mercado, C, 1987
- Fred Merkle, 1B, 1916–1917
- Andy Messersmith, P, 1973–1975, 1979
- Mike Metcalfe, IF/OF, 1998, 2000
- Irish Meusel, OF, 1927
- Benny Meyer, OF, 1913
- Leo Meyer, SS, 1909
- Russ Meyer, P, 1953–1955
- Chief Meyers, C, 1916–1917
- Gene Michael, SS, 1967
- Glenn Mickens, P, 1953
- Doug Mientkiewicz, IF, 2009
- Pete Mikkelsen, P, 1969–1972
- Eddie Miksis, 2B/OF, 1944, 1946–1951
- Aaron Miles, IF, 2011
- Don Miles, OF, 1958
- Johnny Miljus, P, 1917, 1920–1921
- Bob Miller, P, 1963–1967
- Bobby Miller, P, 2023–2026
- Fred Miller, P, 1910
- Hack Miller, OF, 1916
- John Miller, 1B/OF, 1969
- Justin Miller, P, 2010
- Larry Miller, P, 1964
- Lemmie Miller, OF, 1984
- Otto Miller, C, 1910–1922
- Ralph Miller, P, 1898
- Rod Miller, PH, 1957
- Shelby Miller, P, 2023
- Trever Miller, P, 2000
- Tyson Miller, P, 2023
- Walt Miller, P, 1911
- Wally Millies, C, 1934
- Bob Milliken, P, 1953–1954
- Alan Mills, P, 1999–2000
- Buster Mills, OF, 1935
- Wyatt Mills, P, 2026
- Eric Milton, P, 2009
- Paul Minner, P, 1946, 1948–1949
- Bobby Mitchell, OF, 1980–1981
- Clarence Mitchell, P, 1918–1922
- Dale Mitchell, OF, 1956
- Fred Mitchell, P, 1904–1905
- Johnny Mitchell, SS, 1924–1925
- Russ Mitchell, IF, 2010–2011
- Dave Mlicki, P, 1998–1999
- Chad Moeller, C, 2007
- Joe Moeller, P, 1962, 1964, 1966–1971
- George Mohart, P, 1920–1921
- Carlos Monasterios, P, 2010
- Rick Monday, OF, 1977–1984
- Raúl Mondesí, OF, 1993–1999
- Wally Moon, OF, 1959–1965
- Cy Moore, P, 1929–1932
- Dee Moore, C, 1943
- Eddie Moore, 2B, 1929–1930
- Gary Moore, OF, 1970
- Gene Moore, OF, 1939–1940
- Randy Moore, OF, 1936–1937
- Ray Moore, P, 1952–1953
- José Morales, 1B, 1982–1984
- Herbie Moran, OF, 1912–1913
- Bobby Morgan, IF, 1950, 1952–1953
- Eddie Morgan, 1B/OF, 1937
- Mike Morgan, P, 1989–1991
- Reyes Moronta, P, 2022
- Johnny Morrison, P, 1929–1930
- Brandon Morrow, P, 2017
- Walt Moryn, OF, 1954–1955
- Ray Moss, P, 1926–1931
- Earl Mossor, P, 1951
- Guillermo Mota, P, 2002–2004, 2009
- Manny Mota, OF, 1969–1980, 1982
- Glen Moulder, P, 1946
- Ray Mowe, SS, 1913
- Mike Mowrey, 3B, 1916–1917
- Peter Moylan, P, 2013
- Bill Mueller, 3B, 2006
- Terry Mulholland, P, 2001–2002
- Billy Mullen, 3B, 1923
- Scott Mullen, P, 2003
- Joe Mulvey, 3B, 1895
- Max Muncy, IF, 2018–2026
- Van Mungo, P, 1931–1941
- Les Munns, P, 1934–1935
- Mike Muñoz, P, 1989–1990
- Noe Muñoz, C, 1995
- Simmy Murch, IF, 1908
- Rob Murphy, P, 1995
- **Eddie Murray**, 1B, 1989–1991, 1997
- Jim Murray, P, 1922
- Hy Myers, OF, 1909, 1911, 1914–1922
- Rodney Myers, P, 2003–2004
- Brian Myrow, 1B, 2005

== N ==
- Sam Nahem, P, 1938
- Norihiro Nakamura, 3B, 2005
- Dioner Navarro, C, 2005–2006, 2011
- Earl Naylor, OF, 1946
- Charlie Neal, 2B, 1956–1961
- Zach Neal, P, 2018
- Ron Negray, P, 1952, 1958
- Kristopher Negrón, IF/OF, 2019
- Jim Neidlinger, P, 1990
- Bernie Neis, OF, 1920–1924
- Jimmy Nelson, P, 2021
- Rocky Nelson, 1B, 1952, 1956
- Dick Nen, 1B, 1963
- Sheldon Neuse, IF, 2021
- Don Newcombe, P, 1949–1951, 1954–1958
- Bobo Newsom, P, 1929–1930, 1942–1943
- Doc Newton, P, 1901–1902
- Juan Nicasio, P, 2015
- Rod Nichols, P, 1993
- Tom Niedenfuer, P, 1981–1987
- Otho Nitcholas, P, 1945
- Al Nixon, OF, 1915–1916, 1918
- Otis Nixon, OF, 1997
- Ricky Nolasco, P, 2013
- Hideo Nomo, P, 1995–1998, 2002–2004
- Jerry Nops, P, 1900
- Irv Noren, OF, 1960
- Fred Norman, P, 1970
- Bud Norris, P, 2016
- Billy North, OF, 1978
- Hub Northen, OF, 1911–1912
- Darien Núñez, P, 2021
- José Antonio Núñez, P, 2001

== O ==
- Bob O'Brien, P, 1971
- Darby O'Brien, OF, 1888–1892
- Jack O'Brien, C/1B, 1887
- John O'Brien, 2B, 1891
- Lefty O'Doul, OF, 1931–1933
- Ollie O'Mara, SS, 1914–1916, 1918–1919
- Mickey O'Neil, C, 1926
- Frank O'Rourke, 3B, 1917–1918
- Johnny Oates, C, 1977–1979
- Whitey Ock, C, 1935
- Trent Oeltjen, OF, 2010–2011
- Joe Oeschger, P, 1925
- José Offerman, SS, 1990–1995
- Will Ohman, P, 2009
- Shohei Ohtani, P/DH, 2024–2026
- Bob Ojeda, P, 1991–1992
- Dave Oldfield, C/OF, 1885–1886
- Al Oliver, OF, 1985
- Nate Oliver, 2B, 1963–1967
- Miguel Olivo, C, 2014
- Luis Rodríguez Olmo, OF, 1943–1945, 1949
- Gregg Olson, P, 2000–2001
- Ivy Olson, SS, 1915–1924
- Ralph Onis, C, 1935
- Joe Orengo, IF, 1943
- Jesse Orosco, P, 1988, 2001–2002
- Dave Orr, 1B, 1888
- Jorge Orta, OF, 1982
- Phil Ortega, P, 1960–1964
- Ramón Ortiz, P, 2010
- Russ Ortiz, P, 2010
- Tiny Osborne, P, 1924–1925
- Charlie Osgood, P, 1944
- Franquelis Osoria, P, 2005–2006
- Claude Osteen, P, 1965–1973
- Fritz Ostermueller, P, 1943–1944
- Al Osuna, P, 1994
- Antonio Osuna, P, 1995–2000
- Billy Otterson, SS, 1887
- Chink Outen, C, 1933
- James Outman, OF, 2022–2025
- Mickey Owen, C, 1941–1945
- Red Owens, 2B, 1905
- Pablo Ozuna, IF, 2008

== P ==
- Tom Paciorek, OF, 1970–1975
- Don Padgett, C, 1946
- Vicente Padilla, P, 2009–2011
- Andy Pafko OF, 1951–1952
- Phil Page, P, 1934
- Andy Pages, OF, 2024–2026
- Erv Palica, P, 1945, 1947–1951, 1953–1954
- Ed Palmquist, P, 1960–1961
- Edward Paredes, P, 2017–2018
- Chan-ho Park, P, 1994–2001, 2008
- Rick Parker, OF, 1995–1996
- Wes Parker, 1B, 1964–1972
- Art Parks, OF, 1937, 1939
- José Parra, P, 1995
- Jay Partridge, 2B, 1927–1928
- Camilo Pascual, P, 1970
- Kevin Pasley, C, 1974, 1976–1977
- Jim Pastorius, P, 1906–1909
- Harry Pattee, 2B, 1908
- Dave Patterson, P, 1979
- Red Patterson, P, 2014
- Jimmy Pattison, P, 1929
- Xavier Paul, OF, 2009–2011
- James Paxton, P, 2024
- Harley Payne, P, 1896–1898
- Johnny Peacock, C, 1945
- Hal Peck, OF, 1943
- Joc Pederson, OF, 2014–2020
- Stu Pederson, OF, 1985
- Alejandro Peña, P, 1981–1989
- Ángel Peña, C, 1998–1999, 2001
- José Peña, P, 1970–1972
- Brad Penny, P, 2004–2008
- Jimmy Peoples, C/SS, 1885–1888
- Ryan Pepiot, P, 2022–2023
- David Peralta, OF, 2023
- Joel Peralta, P, 2015
- José Peraza, IF/OF, 2015
- Jack Perconte, 2B, 1980–1981
- Antonio Pérez, IF, 2004–2005
- Carlos Pérez, P, 1998–2000
- Chris Perez, P, 2014
- Odalis Pérez, P, 2002–2006
- Charlie Perkins, P, 1934
- Ron Perranoski, P, 1961–1967, 1972
- Pat Perry, P, 1990
- DJ Peters, OF, 2021
- Michael Petersen, P, 2024
- Jim Peterson, P, 1937
- Jesse Petty, P, 1925–1928
- Jeff Pfeffer, P, 1913–1921
- George Pfister, C, 1941
- Lee Pfund, P, 1945
- Babe Phelps, C, 1935–1941
- Ed Phelps, C, 1912–1913
- Ray Phelps, P, 1930–1932
- Bill Phillips, 1B, 1885–1887
- Evan Phillips, P, 2021–2026
- Jason Phillips, C, 2005
- **Mike Piazza**, C, 1992–1998
- Val Picinich, C, 1929–1933
- Juan Pierre, OF, 2007–2009
- Joe Pignatano, C, 1957–1960
- Kevin Pillar, OF, 2022
- George Pinkney, 3B, 1885–1891
- Ed Pipgras, P, 1932
- Norman Plitt, P, 1918, 1927
- Bud Podbielan, P, 1949–1952
- Johnny Podres, P, 1953–1955, 1957–1966
- Scott Podsednik, OF, 2010
- Boots Poffenberger, P, 1939
- A. J. Pollock, OF, 2019–2021
- Nick Polly, 3B, 1937
- Ed Poole, P, 1904
- Jim Poole, P, 1990
- Paul Popovich, 2B, 1968–1969
- Henry Porter, P, 1885–1887
- Bill Posedel, P, 1938
- Sam Post, 1B, 1922
- Dykes Potter, P, 1938
- Bill Pounds, P, 1903
- Boog Powell, 1B, 1977
- Dennis Powell, P, 1985–1986
- Paul Powell, C, 1973, 1975
- Ted Power, P, 1981–1982
- Tot Pressnell, P, 1938–1940
- David Price, P, 2021–2022
- Tom Prince, C, 1994–1998
- Scott Proctor, P, 2007–2008
- Luke Prokopec, P, 2000–2001
- Yasiel Puig, OF, 2013–2018
- Albert Pujols, 1B, 2021
- Nick Punto, IF, 2012–2013
- John Purdin, P, 1964–1965, 1968–1969
- Eddie Pye, IF, 1994–1995

== Q ==
- Kevin Quackenbush, P, 2021
- Paul Quantrill, P, 2002–2003
- Jack Quinn, P, 1931–1932

== R ==
- Steve Rachunok, P, 1940
- Marv Rackley, OF, 1947–1949
- Paul Radford, OF, 1888
- Scott Radinsky, P, 1996–1998
- Jack Radtke, 2B, 1936
- Pat Ragan, P, 1911–1915
- Ed Rakow, P, 1960
- Luke Raley, OF, 2021
- Bob Ramazzotti, IF, 1946, 1948–1949
- Hanley Ramírez, IF, 2012–2014
- Manny Ramirez, OF, 2008–2010
- Nick Ramirez, P, 2024
- Yefry Ramírez, P, 2021
- Yohan Ramírez, P, 2024
- Willie Ramsdell, P, 1947–1948, 1950
- Mike Ramsey, OF, 1987
- Mike Ramsey, IF, 1985
- Willie Randolph, 2B, 1989–1990
- Gary Rath, P, 1998
- Doug Rau, P, 1972–1979
- Lance Rautzhan, P, 1977–1979
- Josh Ravin, P, 2015–2017
- Phil Reardon, OF, 1906
- Jeff Reboulet, IF, 2001–2002
- Josh Reddick, OF, 2016
- Harry Redmond, 2B, 1909
- Howie Reed, P, 1964–1966
- Jake Reed, P, 2021–2023
- Jody Reed, 2B, 1993
- **Pee Wee Reese**, SS, 1940–1942, 1946–1958
- Phil Regan, P, 1966–1968
- Bill Reidy, P, 1899, 1903–1904
- Bobby Reis, P/OF, 1931–1932, 1935
- Pete Reiser, OF, 1940–1942, 1946–1948
- Doc Reisling, P, 1904–1905
- Zach Reks, OF, 2021
- Jack Remsen, OF, 1884
- Jason Repko, OF, 2005–2006, 2008–2009
- Rip Repulski, OF, 1959–1960
- Ed Reulbach, P, 1913–1914
- Jerry Reuss, P, 1979–1987
- Al Reyes, P, 2000–2001
- Dennys Reyes, P, 1997–1998
- Gilberto Reyes, C, 1983–1985, 1987–1988
- Charlie Reynolds, C, 1889
- R. J. Reynolds, OF, 1983–1985
- Billy Rhiel, IF, 1929
- Rick Rhoden, P, 1974–1978
- Paul Richards, C, 1932
- Danny Richardson, IF, 1893
- Pete Richert, P, 1962–1964, 1972–1973
- Harry Riconda, 3B, 1928
- Joe Riggert, OF, 1914
- Adam Riggs, IF, 1997
- Lew Riggs, 3B, 1941–1942, 1946
- Edwin Ríos, 1B, 2019–2022
- Jimmy Ripple, OF, 1939–1940
- Lew Ritter, C, 1902–1908
- Germán Rivera, 3B, 1983–1984
- Juan Rivera, OF, 2011–2012
- Johnny Rizzo, OF, 1942
- Dave Roberts, OF, 2002–2004
- Jim Roberts, P, 1924–1925
- Dick Robertson, P, 1918
- Nick Robertson, P, 2023
- Charlie Robinson, C, 1885
- Chuckie Robinson, C, 2025–2026
- Clint Robinson, 1B, 2014
- Earl Robinson, OF, 1958
- **Frank Robinson**, OF, 1972
- **Jackie Robinson**, 2B, 1947–1956
- Óscar Robles, IF, 2005–2006
- Sergio Robles, C, 1976
- Lou Rochelli, 2B, 1944
- Rich Rodas, P, 1983–1984
- Ellie Rodríguez, C, 1976
- Félix Rodríguez, P, 1995
- Henry Rodríguez, OF, 1992–1995
- Paco Rodriguez, P, 2012–2015
- Preacher Roe, P, 1948–1954
- Ed Roebuck, P, 1955–1958, 1960–1963
- Ron Roenicke, OF, 1981–1983
- Oscar Roettger, P, 1927
- Lee Rogers, P, 1938
- Packy Rogers, IF, 1938
- Mel Rojas, P, 1999
- Miguel Rojas, IF, 2014, 2023–2026
- Stan Rojek, SS, 1942, 1946–1947
- Jimmy Rollins, SS, 2015
- Jamie Romak, IF/OF, 2014
- Jason Romano, IF/OF, 2003
- Jim Romano, P, 1950
- Sergio Romo, P, 2017
- Vicente Romo, P, 1968, 1982
- Ben Rortvedt, C, 2025–2026
- Amed Rosario, IF, 2023–2024
- Eddie Rosario, DH, 2025
- Mike Rose, C, 2005
- John Roseboro, C, 1957–1967
- Chief Roseman, OF, 1887
- Goody Rosen, OF, 1937–1939, 1944–1946
- Max Rosenfeld, OF, 1931–1933
- Cody Ross, OF, 2005–2006
- Dave Ross, C, 2002–2004
- Don Ross, 3B, 1940
- Zac Rosscup, P, 2018–2019
- Ken Rowe, P, 1963
- Schoolboy Rowe, P, 1942
- JeanPierre Roy, P, 1946
- Luther Roy, P, 1929
- Jerry Royster, 3B, 1973–1975
- Wilkin Ruan, OF, 2002–2003
- Nap Rucker, P, 1907–1916
- Ernie Rudolph, P, 1945
- Dutch Ruether, P, 1921–1924
- Justin Ruggiano, OF, 2015
- Carlos Ruiz, C, 2016
- Esteury Ruiz, OF, 2025
- Keibert Ruiz, C, 2020–2021
- Andy Rush, P, 1925
- Dalton Rushing, C, 2025–2026
- Bill Russell, SS, 1969–1986
- Jim Russell, OF, 1950–1951
- John Russell, P, 1917–1918
- Johnny Rutherford, P, 1952
- Jack Ryan, C, 1898
- Jack Ryan, P, 1911
- River Ryan, P, 2024
- Rosy Ryan, P, 1933
- Hyun-jin Ryu, P, 2013–2014, 2016–2019

== S ==
- Casey Sadler, P, 2019
- Olmedo Sáenz, 1B 2004–2007
- Takashi Saito, P, 2006–2008
- Eduardo Salazar, P, 2024
- Juan Samuel, 2B, 1990–1992
- Duaner Sánchez, P, 2004–2005
- Mike Sandlock, C, 1945–1946
- Jerry Sands, 1B/OF, 2011–2012
- Chance Sanford, IF, 1999
- Dennis Santana, P, 2018–2021
- F. P. Santangelo, OF, 2000
- Sergio Santos, P, 2015
- Roki Sasaki, P, 2025–2026
- Matt Sauer, P, 2025
- Jack Savage, P, 1987
- Ted Savage, OF, 1968
- Dave Sax, C, 1982–1983
- Steve Sax, 2B, 1981–1988
- Bill Sayles, P, 1943
- Josh Sborz, P, 2019–2020
- Doc Scanlan, P, 1904–1907, 1909–1911
- Bill Schardt, P, 1911–1912
- Scott Schebler, OF, 2015
- Al Scheer, OF, 1913
- Bill Schenck, IF, 1885
- Max Scherzer, P, 2021
- Travis Schlichting, P, 2009–2010
- Dutch Schliebner, 1B, 1923
- Ray Schmandt, 1B, 1918–1922
- Henry Schmidt, P, 1903
- Jason Schmidt, P, 2007, 2009
- Johnny Schmitz, P, 1951–1952
- Steve Schmoll, P, 2005
- Charlie Schmutz, P, 1914–1915
- Frank Schneiberg, P, 1910
- Dick Schofield (Jr), SS, 1995
- Dick Schofield (Sr), SS, 1966–1967
- Gene Schott, P, 1939
- Paul Schreiber, P, 1922–1923
- Pop Schriver, C, 1886
- Howie Schultz, 1B, 1943–1947
- Jaime Schultz, P, 2019
- Joe Schultz, OF, 1915
- Skip Schumaker, 2B/OF, 2013
- Ferdie Schupp, P, 1921
- Mike Scioscia, C, 1980–1992
- Dick Scott, P, 1963
- Tanner Scott, P, 2025–2026
- Tayler Scott, P, 2023
- Corey Seager, SS, 2015–2021
- Rudy Seánez, P, 1994–1995, 2007
- Ray Searage, P, 1989–1990
- Tom Seats, P, 1945
- Jimmy Sebring, OF, 1909
- Larry See, 1B, 1986
- Rob Segedin, IF/OF, 2016–2017
- Aaron Sele, P, 2006
- Justin Sellers, IF, 2011–2013
- Dave Sells, P, 1975
- Jae Weong Seo, P, 2006
- Elmer Sexauer, P, 1948
- Greg Shanahan, P, 1973–1974
- Mike Sharperson, IF/OF, 1987–1993
- George Sharrott, P, 1893–1894
- Joe Shaute, P, 1931–1933
- Jeff Shaw, P, 1998–2001
- Merv Shea, C, 1938
- Jimmy Sheckard, OF, 1897–1898, 1900–1905
- Emmet Sheehan, P, 2023, 2025–2026
- Jack Sheehan, IF, 1920–1921
- Tommy Sheehan, 3B, 1908
- Gary Sheffield, OF, 1998–2001
- John Shelby, OF, 1987–1990
- Jimmie Sherfy, P, 2021
- Red Sheridan, IF, 1918, 1920
- Vince Sherlock, 2B, 1935
- George Sherrill, P, 2009–2010
- Larry Sherry, P, 1958–1963
- Norm Sherry, C, 1959–1962
- Billy Shindle, 3B, 1894–1898
- Craig Shipley, 3B, 1986–1987
- Bart Shirley, IF, 1964, 1966, 1968
- Steve Shirley, P, 1982
- George Shoch, IF/OF, 1893–1897
- Harry Shriver, P, 1922–1923
- George Shuba, OF, 1948–1950, 1952–1955
- Paul Shuey, P, 2002–2003
- Dick Siebert, 1B, 1932, 1936
- Ed Silch, OF, 1888
- Joe Simpson, OF, 1975–1978
- Duke Sims, C, 1971–1972
- Bill Singer, P, 1964–1972
- Fred Sington, OF, 1938–1939
- Ted Sizemore, 2B, 1969–1970, 1976
- Frank Skaff, 1B, 1935
- Bill Skowron, 1B, 1963
- Tarik Skubal, P, 2026
- Gordon Slade, SS, 1930–1932
- Lefty Sloat, P, 1948
- Aleck Smith, C, 1897–1900
- Charley Smith, 3B, 1960–1961
- Dick Smith, 1B/OF, 1965
- George Smith, P, 1918, 1923
- Germany Smith, SS, 1885–1890, 1897
- Greg Smith, IF, 1991
- Happy Smith, OF, 1910
- Jack Smith, P, 1962–1963
- Phenomenal Smith, P, 1885
- Red Smith, 3B, 1911–1914
- Reggie Smith, OF, 1976–1981
- Sherry Smith, P, 1915–1917, 1919–1922
- Tony Smith, SS, 1910–1911
- Will Smith, C, 2019–2025
- Clancy Smyres, SS, 1944
- Red Smyth, OF, 1915–1917
- Harry Smythe, P, 1934
- Blake Snell, P, 2025–2026
- **Duke Snider**, OF, 1947–1962
- Cory Snyder, OF, 1993–1994
- Gene Snyder, P, 1959
- Jack Snyder, C, 1917
- Eddie Solomon, P, 1973–1974
- Andy Sommerville, P, 1894
- Elías Sosa, P, 1976–1977
- Denny Sothern, OF, 1931
- Steven Souza Jr., OF, 2021
- Daryl Spencer, SS, 1961–1963
- Roy Spencer, C, 1937–1938
- Karl Spooner, P, 1954–1955
- Dennis Springer, P, 2001–2002
- Eddie Stack, P, 1912–1913
- Tuck Stainback, OF, 1938–1939
- George Stallings, C, 1890
- Jerry Standaert, IF, 1925–1926
- Don Stanhouse, P, 1980
- Eddie Stanky, 2B, 1944–1947
- Dolly Stark, SS, 1910–1912
- Jigger Statz, OF, 1927–1928
- Chris Stratton, P, 2025
- Bill Steele, P, 1914
- Elmer Steele, P, 1911
- Farmer Steelman, C, 1900–1901
- Ed Stein, P, 1892–1896, 1898
- **Casey Stengel**, OF, 1912–1917
- Jerry Stephenson, P, 1970
- Ed Stevens, 1B, 1945–1947
- Brock Stewart, P, 2016–2019, 2025–2026
- Dave Stewart, P, 1978, 1981–1983
- Scott Stewart, P, 2004
- Stuffy Stewart, 2B, 1923
- Bob Stinson, C, 1969–1970
- Milt Stock, 3B, 1924–1926
- Gavin Stone, P, 2023–2024
- Harry Stovey, OF, 1893
- Mike Strahler, P, 1970–1972
- Sammy Strang, IF, 1903–1904
- Joe Strauss, OF, 1886
- Darryl Strawberry, OF, 1991–1993
- Elmer Stricklett, P, 1905–1907
- Ross Stripling, P, 2016–2020
- Joe Stripp, 3B, 1932–1937
- Dutch Stryker, P, 1926
- Dick Stuart, 1B, 1966
- Franklin Stubbs, 1B/OF, 1984–1989
- Eric Stults, P, 2006–2009
- Tanyon Sturtze, P, 2008
- Bill Sudakis, 3B, 1968–1971
- Wander Suero, P, 2023
- Clyde Sukeforth, C, 1932–1934, 1945
- Billy Sullivan Jr., C, 1942
- Tom Sunkel, P, 1944
- Eric Surkamp, P, 2015
- Rick Sutcliffe, P, 1976, 1978–1981
- **Don Sutton**, P, 1966–1980, 1988
- Ed Swartwood, 1B/OF, 1885–1887
- Mark Sweeney, 1B, 2007–2008
- Bill Swift, P, 1941
- Noah Syndergaard, P, 2023

== T ==
- Vito Tamulis, P, 1938–1941
- Kevin Tapani, P, 1995
- Jack Taschner, P, 2010
- Tommy Tatum, OF, 1941, 1947
- Alex Taveras, IF, 1982–1983
- Chris Taylor, IF/OF, 2016–2025
- Danny Taylor, OF, 1932–1936
- Harry Taylor, P, 1946–1948
- Zack Taylor, C, 1935
- Dick Teed, C, 1953
- Chuck Templeton, P, 1955–1956
- Nick Tepesch, P, 2016
- Joe Tepsic, OF, 1946
- Adonis Terry, P/OF, 1884–1891
- Wayne Terwilliger, 2B, 1951
- Marcus Thames, OF, 2011
- Grant Thatcher, P, 1903–1904
- Ryan Theriot, 2B, 2010
- Henry Thielman, P, 1903
- Alek Thomas, OF, 2026
- Derrel Thomas, 2B/OF, 1979–1983
- Fay Thomas, P, 1932
- Ian Thomas, P, 2015
- Ray Thomas, C, 1938
- Gary Thomasson, OF, 1979–1980
- **Jim Thome**, PH, 2009
- Derek Thompson, P, 2005
- Don Thompson, OF, 1951, 1953–1954
- Fresco Thompson, 2B, 1931–1932
- Milt Thompson, OF, 1996
- Tim Thompson, C, 1954
- Trayce Thompson, OF, 2016–2017, 2022–2023
- Hank Thormahlen, P, 1925
- Joe Thurston, IF, 2002–2004
- Sloppy Thurston, P, 1930–1933
- Cotton Tierney, 2B, 1925
- Terry Tiffee, IF/OF, 2008
- Al Todd, C, 1939
- Andrew Toles, OF, 2016–2018
- Shawn Tolleson, P, 2012–2013
- Brett Tomko, P, 2006–2007
- Steve Toole, P, 1886–1887
- Bert Tooley, SS, 1911–1912
- Jeff Torborg, C, 1964–1970
- Ronald Torreyes, IF, 2015
- Dick Tracewski, IF, 1962–1965
- Taylor Trammell, OF, 2024
- Brian Traxler, 1B, 1990
- George Treadway, OF, 1894–1895
- Jeff Treadway, 2B, 1994–1995
- Matt Treanor, C, 2012
- Blake Treinen, P, 2020–2022, 2024–2026
- Nick Tremark, OF, 1934–1936
- Overton Tremper, OF, 1927–1928
- Alex Treviño, C, 1986–1987
- Carlos Triunfel, IF, 2014
- Lou Trivino, P, 2025
- Ricky Trlicek, P, 1993
- Mike Trombley, P, 2001
- Ramón Troncoso, P, 2008–2011
- Chin-hui Tsao, P, 2007, 2015–2016
- Yoshi Tsutsugo, OF, 2021
- Kyle Tucker, OF, 2026
- Tommy Tucker, 1B, 1898
- John Tudor, P, 1988–1989
- Justin Turner, IF, 2014–2022
- Trea Turner, IF, 2021–2022
- Ty Tyson, OF, 1928

== U ==
- Edwin Uceta, P, 2021
- Fred Underwood, P, 1894
- José Ureña, P, 2025
- Julio Urías, P, 2016–2023
- Juan Uribe, IF, 2011–2015
- Chase Utley, IF, 2015–2018

== V ==
- Mike Vail, OF, 1984
- Ismael Valdez, P, 1994–2000
- René Valdez, P, 1957
- Wilson Valdez, IF, 2007
- José Valentín, 3B, 2005
- Bobby Valentine, IF, 1969, 1971–1972
- Fernando Valenzuela, P, 1980–1990
- Breyvic Valera, IF/OF, 2018
- Héctor Valle, C, 1965
- Elmer Valo, OF, 1957–1958
- Deacon Van Buren, OF, 1904
- Chris Van Cuyk, P, 1950–1952
- Johnny Van Cuyk, P, 1947–1949
- Scott Van Slyke, 1B/OF, 2012–2017
- Ricky Vanasco, P, 2024
- **Dazzy Vance**, P, 1922–1932, 1935
- Sandy Vance, P, 1970–1971
- Ed Vande Berg, P, 1986
- Claudio Vargas, P, 2009
- Miguel Vargas, IF/OF, 2022–2024
- Gus Varland, P, 2023–2024
- Andrew Vasquez, P, 2021
- **Arky Vaughan**, SS, 1942–1943, 1947–1948
- Eugenio Vélez, IF/OF, 2011
- Will Venable, OF, 2016
- Mike Venafro, P, 2004
- Pat Venditte, P, 2018
- Robin Ventura, 3B, 2003–2004
- Alex Verdugo, OF, 2017–2019
- Zoilo Versalles, SS, 1968
- Alex Vesia, P, 2021–2026
- Rube Vickers, P, 1903
- Shane Victorino, OF, 2012
- Joe Visner, C/OF, 1889
- José Vizcaíno, IF, 1989–1990, 1998–2000
- Edinson Vólquez, P, 2013
- Joe Vosmik, OF, 1940–1941

== W ==
- Paul Wachtel, P, 1917
- Ben Wade, P, 1952–1954
- Cory Wade, P, 2008–2009
- Bull Wagner, P, 1913–1914
- Butts Wagner, 3B, 1898
- Dixie Walker, OF, 1939–1947
- Mysterious Walker, P, 1913
- Oscar Walker, 1B/OF, 1884
- Rube Walker, C, 1951–1958
- Joe Wall, C, 1902
- Josh Wall, P, 2012–2013
- Stan Wall, P, 1975–1977
- Tim Wallach, 3B, 1993–1996
- Lee Walls, OF, 1962–1964
- Dave Walsh, P, 1990
- Zach Walters, OF, 2016
- Danny Walton, OF, 1976
- **Lloyd Waner**, OF, 1944
- **Paul Waner**, OF, 1943–1944
- Chuck Ward, SS, 1918–1922
- Daryle Ward, OF, 2003
- **John Ward**, IF, 1891–1892
- Preston Ward, 1B, 1948
- Rube Ward, OF, 1902
- Ryan Ward, 1B, 2026
- Fred Warner, 3B, 1884
- Jack Warner, 3B, 1929–1931
- Tommy Warren, P, 1944
- Carl Warwick, OF, 1961
- Jimmy Wasdell, OF, 1940–1941
- Ron Washington, SS, 1977
- George Watkins, OF, 1936
- Tony Watson, P, 2017
- Gary Wayne, P, 1994
- Eric Weaver, P, 1998
- Jeff Weaver, P, 2004–2005, 2009
- Hank Webb, P, 1977
- Les Webber, P, 1942–1946
- Mitch Webster, OF, 1991–1995
- Gary Weiss, SS, 1980–1981
- Bob Welch, P, 1978–1987
- Brad Wellman, 2B, 1987
- David Wells, P, 2007
- John Wells, P, 1944
- Terry Wells, P, 1990
- Johnny Werhas, 3B, 1964–1965, 1967
- Jayson Werth, OF, 2004–2005
- Matt West, P, 2015
- Max West, OF, 1928–1929
- John Wetteland, P, 1989–1991
- Gus Weyhing, P, 1900
- Mack Wheat, C, 1915–1919
- **Zack Wheat**, OF, 1909–1926
- Ed Wheeler, IF, 1902
- Barney White, IF, 1945
- Devon White, OF, 1999–2000
- Larry White, P, 1983–1984
- Mitch White, P, 2020–2022
- Myron White, OF, 1978
- Tyler White, 1B, 2019
- Terry Whitfield, OF, 1984–1986
- Jesse Whiting, P, 1906–1907
- Dick Whitman, OF, 1946–1949
- Possum Whitted, OF, 1922
- Kemp Wicker, P, 1941
- Joe Wieland, P, 2015
- **Hoyt Wilhelm**, P, 1971–1972
- Kaiser Wilhelm, P, 1908–1910
- Rick Wilkins, C, 1999
- Nick Willhite, P, 1963–1966
- **Dick Williams**, IF/OF, 1951–1954, 1956
- Eddie Williams, 1B, 1997
- Jeff Williams, P, 1999–2002
- Leon Williams, IF, 1926
- Luke Williams, IF, 2023
- Reggie Williams, OF, 1995
- Reggie Williams, OF, 1985–1987
- Stan Williams, P, 1958–1962
- Todd Williams, P, 1995
- Woody Williams, 2B, 1938
- Maury Wills, SS, 1959–1966, 1969–1972
- Bob Wilson, OF, 1958
- Brian Wilson, P, 2013–2014
- Eddie Wilson, OF, 1936–1937
- **Hack Wilson**, OF, 1932–1934
- Steve Wilson, P, 1991–1993
- Tex Wilson, P, 1924
- Tom Wilson, C, 2004
- Tug Wilson, C/OF, 1884
- Gordie Windhorn, OF, 1961
- Jim Winford, P, 1938
- Lave Winham, P, 1902
- Tom Winsett, OF, 1936–1938
- Hank Winston, P, 1936
- Chris Withrow, P, 2013–2014
- Whitey Witt, OF, 1926
- Pete Wojey, P, 1954
- Randy Wolf, P, 2007, 2009
- Tony Wolters, C, 2022
- Kolten Wong, IF, 2023
- Alex Wood, P, 2015–2018, 2020
- Tracy Woodson, 3B, 1987–1989
- Todd Worrell, P, 1993–1997
- Gene Wright, P, 1901
- Glenn Wright, SS, 1929–1933
- Jamey Wright, P, 2012, 2014
- Ricky Wright, P, 1982–1983
- Zeke Wrigley, SS, 1899
- Justin Wrobleski, P, 2024–2025
- Kelly Wunsch, P, 2005
- Frank Wurm, P, 1944
- Whit Wyatt, P, 1939–1944
- Jimmy Wynn, OF, 1974–1975
- Austin Wynns, C, 2023

== Y ==
- Ad Yale, 1B, 1905
- Yoshinobu Yamamoto, P, 2024–2026
- Ryan Yarbrough, P, 2023–2024
- Rube Yarrison, P, 1924
- Kirby Yates, P, 2025
- Joe Yeager, P/3B, 1898–1900
- Steve Yeager, C, 1972–1985
- Earl Yingling, P, 1912–1913
- Delwyn Young, IF/OF, 2006–2008
- Eric Young, 2B, 1992, 1997–1999
- Matt Young, P, 1987
- Michael Young, IF, 2013

== Z ==
- Albert Zachary, P, 1944
- Tom Zachary, P, 1934–1936
- Pat Zachry, P, 1983–1984
- Geoff Zahn, P, 1973–1975
- Todd Zeile, 3B, 1997–1998
- Don Zimmer, IF, 1954–1959, 1963
- Bill Zimmerman, OF, 1915
- Eddie Zimmerman, 3B, 1911
