= 1924 Brooklyn Robins season =

1924 Brooklyn Robins
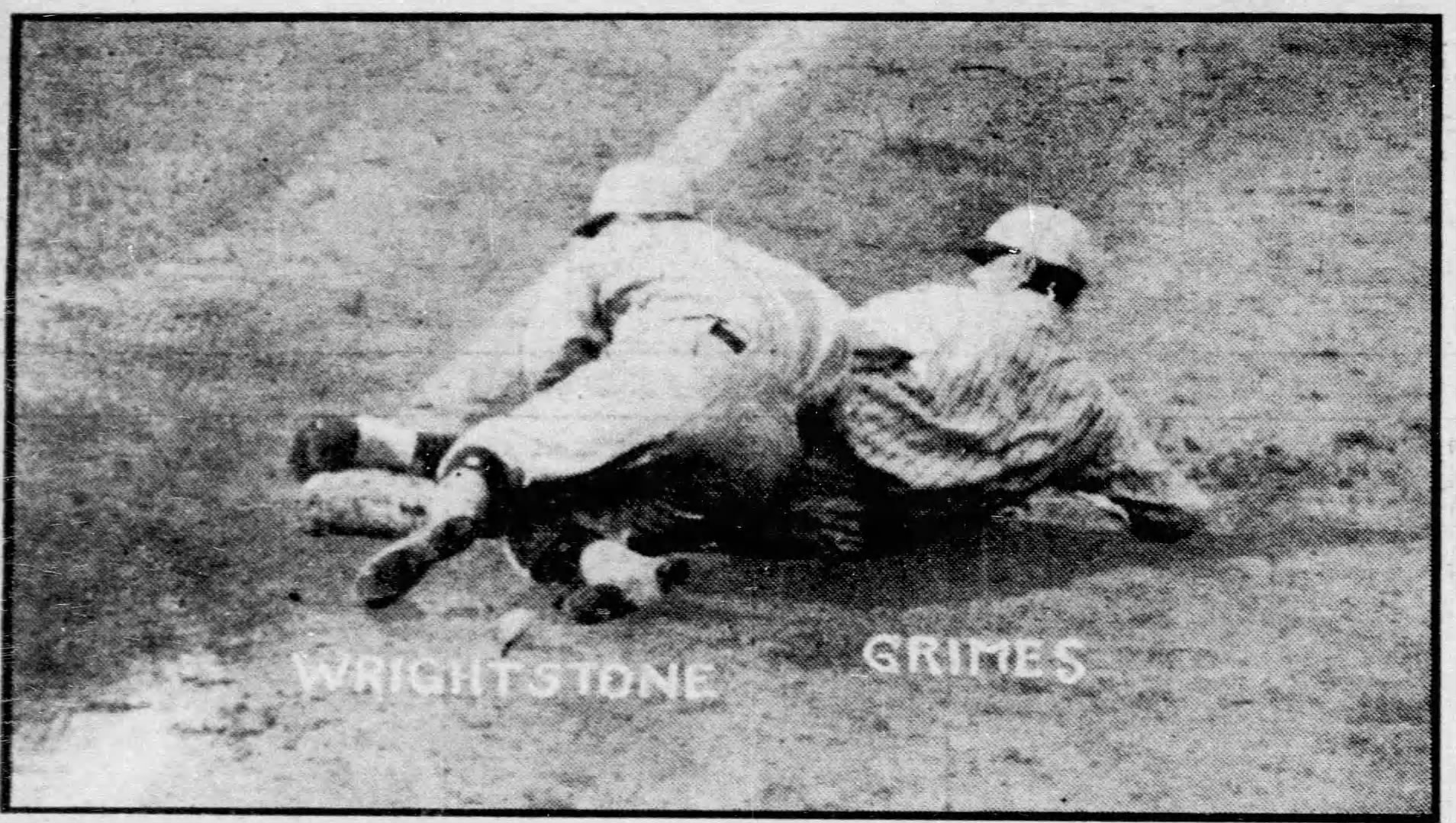
- May 1, 1924: Brooklyn Robins vs. the Philadelphia Phillies
- League: National League
- Ballpark: Ebbets Field
- City: Brooklyn, New York
- Record: 92–62 (.597)
- League place: 2nd
- Owners: Charles Ebbets, Ed McKeever, Stephen McKeever
- President: Charles Ebbets
- Managers: Wilbert Robinson

The 1924 Brooklyn Robins put up a good fight with the rival New York Giants before falling just short of the pennant. Staff ace Dazzy Vance led the league in wins, ERA, strikeouts and complete games to be named the National League Most Valuable Player.

== Offseason ==
- November 1924: Johnny Mitchell was purchased by the Robins from the Boston Red Sox.
- December 1924: Bert Griffith was traded by the Robins to the Washington Senators for Bonnie Hollingsworth.

== Regular season ==
=== Season standings ===
National League
Team	W	L	Pct.	GB	Home	Road
New York Giants	93	60	.608	—	51‍–‍26	42‍–‍34
Brooklyn Robins	92	62	.597	1½	46‍–‍31	46‍–‍31
Pittsburgh Pirates	90	63	.588	3	49‍–‍28	41‍–‍35
Cincinnati Reds	83	70	.542	10	43‍–‍33	40‍–‍37
Chicago Cubs	81	72	.529	12	46‍–‍31	35‍–‍41
St. Louis Cardinals	65	89	.422	28½	40‍–‍37	25‍–‍52
Philadelphia Phillies	55	96	.364	37	26‍–‍49	29‍–‍47
Boston Braves	53	100	.346	40	28‍–‍48	25‍–‍52

=== Record vs. opponents ===
1924 National League record Sources:
Team	BSN	BRO	CHC	CIN	NYG	PHI	PIT	STL
Boston	—	7–15	6–15	12–10	5–17	10–12–1	7–15	6–16
Brooklyn	15–7	—	12–10	12–10	8–14	17–5	13–9	15–7
Chicago	15–6	10–12	—	9–13	9–13–1	16–6	7–15	15–7
Cincinnati	10–12	10–12	13–9	—	9–13	16–5	12–10	13–9
New York	17–5	14–8	13–9–1	13–9	—	14–7	9–13	13–9
Philadelphia	12–10–1	5–17	6–16	5–16	7–14	—	8–13	12–10
Pittsburgh	15–7	9–13	15–7	10–12	13–9	13–8	—	15–7
St. Louis	16–6	7–15	7–15	9–13	9–13	10–12	7–15	—

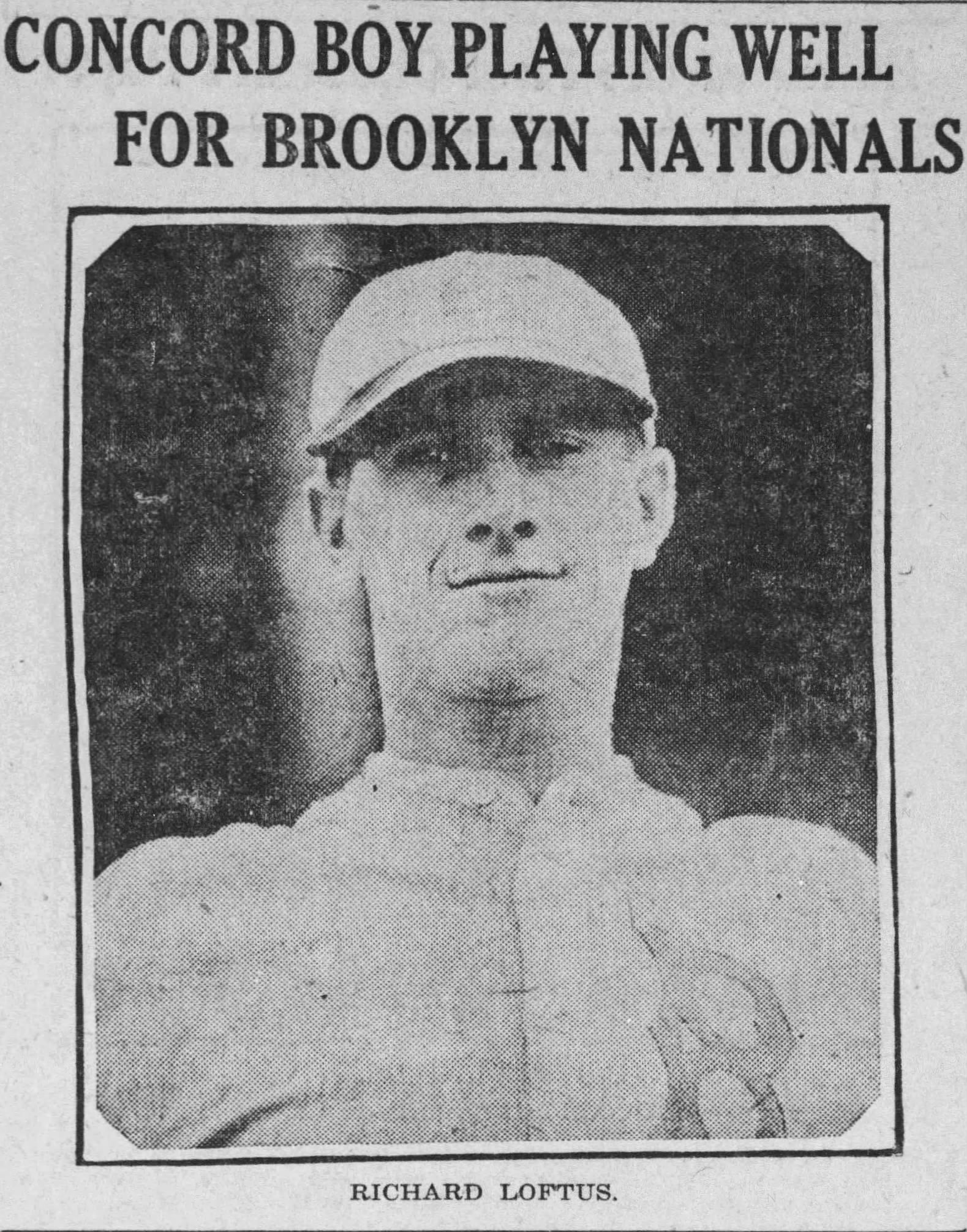
1924 photograph of Brooklyn Robins outfielder Dick Loftus

=== Notable transactions ===
- April 16, 1924: Ray French was purchased from the Robins by the Chicago White Sox.
- April 25, 1924: Mike González was traded by the Robins to the St. Louis Cardinals for Milt Stock.
- May 16, 1924: Tiny Osborne was purchased by the Robins from the Chicago Cubs.
- June 14, 1924: Leo Dickerman was traded by the Robins to the St. Louis Cardinals for Bill Doak.
- December 17, 1924: Dutch Ruether was purchased from the Robins by the Washington Senators.

=== Roster ===
1924 Brooklyn Robins
Roster
Pitchers: Art Decatur; Leo Dickerman; Bill Doak; Rube Ehrhardt; Nelson Greene; Burleigh Grimes; Dutch Henry; Bonnie Hollingsworth; Tom Long; Tiny Osborne; Jim Roberts; Dutch Ruether; Dazzy Vance; Tex Wilson; Rube Yarrison	Catchers: Hank DeBerry; Charlie Hargreaves; Zack Taylor; Infielders: Jack Fournier; Andy High; Fred Johnston; Jimmy Johnston; Binky Jones; Joe Klugmann; Johnny Mitchell; Ivy Olson; Milt Stock	Outfielders: Gene Bailey; Eddie Brown; Tommy Griffith; Dick Loftus; Bernie Neis; Zack Wheat	Manager: Wilbert Robinson; Coaches: Ivy Olson

== Player stats ==
= Indicates team leader

= Indicates league leader

=== Batting ===
==== Starters by position ====
Note: Pos = Position; G = Games played; AB = At bats; H = Hits; Avg. = Batting average; HR = Home runs; RBI = Runs batted in

Pos	Player	G	AB	H	Avg.	HR	RBI
C	Zack Taylor	99	345	100	.290	1	39
1B	Jack Fournier	154	563	188	.334	27	116
2B	Andy High	144	582	191	.328	6	61
3B	Milt Stock	142	561	136	.242	2	52
SS	Johnny Mitchell	64	243	64	.263	1	16
OF	Tommy Griffith	140	482	121	.251	3	67
OF	Zack Wheat	141	566	212	.375	14	97
OF	Eddie Brown	114	455	140	.308	5	78

==== Other batters ====
Note: G = Games played; AB = At bats; H = Hits; Avg. = Batting average; HR = Home runs; RBI = Runs batted in

Player	G	AB	H	Avg.	HR	RBI
Jimmy Johnston	86	315	94	.298	2	29
Hank DeBerry	77	218	53	.243	3	26
Bernie Neis	80	211	64	.303	4	26
Dick Loftus	46	81	22	.272	0	8
Joe Klugmann	31	79	13	.165	0	3
Gene Bailey	18	46	11	.239	1	4
Binky Jones	10	37	4	.108	0	2
Charlie Hargreaves	27	27	11	.407	0	5
Ivy Olson	38	27	6	.222	0	0
Fred Johnston	4	4	1	.250	0	0

=== Pitching ===
= Indicates league leader

==== Starting pitchers ====
Note: G = Games pitched; IP = Innings pitched; W = Wins; L = Losses; ERA = Earned run average; SO = Strikeouts

Player	G	IP	W	L	ERA	SO
Burleigh Grimes	38	310.2	22	13	3.82	135
Dazzy Vance	35	308.1	28	6	2.16	262
Dutch Ruether	30	168.0	8	13	3.91	63
Bill Doak	21	149.1	11	5	3.07	32

==== Other pitchers ====
Note: G = Games pitched; IP = Innings pitched; W = Wins; L = Losses; ERA = Earned run average; SO = Strikeouts

Player	G	IP	W	L	ERA	SO
Art Decatur	31	126.1	10	9	4.13	38
Tiny Osborne	21	104.1	6	5	5.09	52
Rube Ehrhardt	15	83.2	5	3	2.26	13
Dutch Henry	16	46.0	1	2	5.67	11
Jim Roberts	11	25.1	0	3	7.46	10
Leo Dickerman	7	19.2	0	0	5.49	9
Rube Yarrison	3	11.0	0	2	6.55	2
Nelson Greene	4	9.0	0	1	4.00	3
Bonnie Hollingsworth	3	8.2	1	0	6.23	7

==== Relief pitchers ====
Note: G = Games pitched; W = Wins; L = Losses; SV = Saves; ERA = Earned run average; SO = Strikeouts

Player	G	W	L	SV	ERA	SO
Tex Wilson	2	0	0	0	14.73	1
Tom Long	1	0	0	0	9.00	0

== Awards and honors ==
- National League Most Valuable Player
  - Dazzy Vance
