= 1925 Brooklyn Robins season =

1925 Brooklyn Robins
- League: National League
- Ballpark: Ebbets Field
- City: Brooklyn, New York
- Record: 68–85 (.444)
- League place: 6th
- Owners: Charles Ebbets, Ed McKeever, Stephen McKeever, Brooklyn Trust Company
- President: Charles Ebbets, Ed McKeever, Stephen McKeever, Wilbert Robinson
- Managers: Wilbert Robinson

The 1925 season was one of tragedy for the Brooklyn Robins. Majority owner and team president Charles Ebbets fell ill after returning home from spring training and died on the morning of April 18. Ed McKeever took over as president, but he caught a cold at Ebbets' funeral and died within a week of pneumonia. Stephen McKeever became the principal owner and team manager Wilbert Robinson was additionally given the position of president. Through it all, the woeful Robins finished in sixth place.

== Offseason ==
- February 4, 1925: Bernie Neis was traded by the Robins to the Boston Braves for Cotton Tierney.

== Regular season ==
=== Season standings ===
National League
| Team | W | L | Pct. | GB | Home | Road |
|---|---|---|---|---|---|---|
| Pittsburgh Pirates | 95 | 58 | .621 | — | 52‍–‍25 | 43‍–‍33 |
| New York Giants | 86 | 66 | .566 | 8½ | 47‍–‍29 | 39‍–‍37 |
| Cincinnati Reds | 80 | 73 | .523 | 15 | 44‍–‍32 | 36‍–‍41 |
| St. Louis Cardinals | 77 | 76 | .503 | 18 | 48‍–‍28 | 29‍–‍48 |
| Boston Braves | 70 | 83 | .458 | 25 | 37‍–‍39 | 33‍–‍44 |
| Brooklyn Robins | 68 | 85 | .444 | 27 | 38‍–‍39 | 30‍–‍46 |
| Philadelphia Phillies | 68 | 85 | .444 | 27 | 40‍–‍37 | 28‍–‍48 |
| Chicago Cubs | 68 | 86 | .442 | 27½ | 37‍–‍40 | 31‍–‍46 |

=== Record vs. opponents ===
1925 National League record Sources:
| Team | BSN | BRO | CHC | CIN | NYG | PHI | PIT | STL |
|---|---|---|---|---|---|---|---|---|
| Boston | — | 13–8 | 12–10 | 9–13 | 11–11 | 6–16 | 7–15 | 12–10 |
| Brooklyn | 8–13 | — | 11–11 | 12–10 | 10–12 | 11–11 | 5–17 | 11–11 |
| Chicago | 10–12 | 11–11 | — | 10–12 | 7–15 | 10–12 | 12–10 | 8–14 |
| Cincinnati | 13–9 | 10–12 | 12–10 | — | 9–13 | 16–6 | 8–13 | 12–10 |
| New York | 11–11 | 12–10 | 15–7 | 13–9 | — | 13–8 | 10–12 | 12–9 |
| Philadelphia | 16–6 | 11–11 | 12–10 | 6–16 | 8–13 | — | 8–14 | 7–15 |
| Pittsburgh | 15–7 | 17–5 | 10–12 | 13–8 | 12–10 | 14–8 | — | 14–8 |
| St. Louis | 10–12 | 11–11 | 14–8 | 10–12 | 9–12 | 15–7 | 8–14 | — |

=== Notable transactions ===
- May 1, 1925: Art Decatur was traded by the Robins to the Philadelphia Phillies for Bill Hubbell.
- May 10, 1925: Tommy Griffith was traded by the Robins to the Chicago Cubs for Bob Barrett.

=== Roster ===
1925 Brooklyn Robins
Roster
| Pitchers: Lloyd Brown; Guy Cantrell; Art Decatur; Rube Ehrhardt; Jumbo Elliott; Nelson Greene; Burleigh Grimes; Bill Hubbell; Bob McGraw; Joe Oeschger; Tiny Osborne; Jesse Petty; Jim Roberts; Andy Rush; Hank Thormahlen; Dazzy Vance | Catchers: Hank DeBerry; Charlie Hargreaves; Zack Taylor; Infielders: Chuck Corgan; Hod Ford; Jack Fournier; Andy High; Jimmy Johnston; Johnny Mitchell; Milt Stock; Cotton Tierney | Outfielders: Bob Barrett; Eddie Brown; Dick Cox; Tommy Griffith; Roy Hutson; Dick Loftus; Zack Wheat; Other batters: Jerry Standaert | Manager: Wilbert Robinson; Coaches: Ben Egan |

== Player stats ==
=== Batting ===
==== Starters by position ====
Note: Pos = Position; G = Games played; AB = At bats; H = Hits; Avg. = Batting average; HR = Home runs; RBI = Runs batted in

| Pos | Player | G | AB | H | Avg. | HR | RBI |
|---|---|---|---|---|---|---|---|
| C | Zack Taylor | 109 | 352 | 109 | .310 | 3 | 44 |
| 1B | Jack Fournier | 145 | 545 | 191 | .350 | 22 | 130 |
| 2B | Milt Stock | 146 | 615 | 202 | .328 | 1 | 62 |
| 3B | Jimmy Johnston | 123 | 431 | 128 | .297 | 2 | 43 |
| SS | Johnny Mitchell | 97 | 336 | 84 | .250 | 0 | 18 |
| OF | Eddie Brown | 153 | 618 | 189 | .306 | 5 | 99 |
| OF | Zack Wheat | 150 | 616 | 221 | .359 | 14 | 103 |
| OF | Dick Cox | 122 | 434 | 143 | .329 | 7 | 64 |

==== Other batters ====
Note: G = Games played; AB = At bats; H = Hits; Avg. = Batting average; HR = Home runs; RBI = Runs batted in

| Player | G | AB | H | Avg. | HR | RBI |
|---|---|---|---|---|---|---|
| Cotton Tierney | 93 | 265 | 68 | .257 | 2 | 39 |
| Hod Ford | 66 | 216 | 59 | .273 | 1 | 15 |
| Hank DeBerry | 67 | 193 | 50 | .259 | 2 | 24 |
| Dick Loftus | 51 | 131 | 31 | .237 | 0 | 13 |
| Andy High | 44 | 115 | 23 | .200 | 0 | 6 |
| Charlie Hargreaves | 45 | 83 | 23 | .277 | 0 | 13 |
| Chuck Corgan | 14 | 47 | 8 | .170 | 0 | 0 |
| Roy Hutson | 7 | 8 | 4 | .500 | 0 | 1 |
| Tommy Griffith | 7 | 4 | 0 | .000 | 0 | 0 |
| Bob Barrett | 1 | 1 | 0 | .000 | 0 | 1 |
| Jerry Standaert | 1 | 1 | 0 | .000 | 0 | 0 |

=== Pitching ===
==== Starting pitchers ====
Note: G = Games pitched; IP = Innings pitched; W = Wins; L = Losses; ERA = Earned run average; SO = Strikeouts

| Player | G | IP | W | L | ERA | SO |
|---|---|---|---|---|---|---|
| Dazzy Vance | 31 | 265.1 | 22 | 9 | 3.53 | 221 |
| Burleigh Grimes | 33 | 246.2 | 12 | 19 | 5.04 | 73 |
| Rube Ehrhardt | 36 | 207.2 | 10 | 14 | 5.03 | 47 |
| Jesse Petty | 28 | 153.0 | 9 | 9 | 4.88 | 39 |
| Bob McGraw | 2 | 19.2 | 0 | 2 | 3.20 | 3 |

==== Other pitchers ====
Note: G = Games pitched; IP = Innings pitched; W = Wins; L = Losses; ERA = Earned run average; SO = Strikeouts

| Player | G | IP | W | L | ERA | SO |
|---|---|---|---|---|---|---|
| Tiny Osborne | 41 | 175.0 | 8 | 15 | 4.94 | 59 |
| Bill Hubbell | 33 | 86.2 | 3 | 6 | 5.30 | 16 |
| Lloyd Brown | 17 | 63.1 | 0 | 3 | 4.12 | 23 |
| Joe Oeschger | 21 | 37.0 | 1 | 2 | 6.08 | 6 |
| Guy Cantrell | 14 | 36.0 | 1 | 0 | 3.00 | 13 |
| Hank Thormahlen | 5 | 16.0 | 0 | 3 | 3.94 | 7 |
| Jumbo Elliott | 3 | 10.2 | 0 | 2 | 8.44 | 3 |
| Andy Rush | 4 | 9.2 | 0 | 1 | 9.31 | 4 |

==== Relief pitchers ====
Note: G = Games pitched; W = Wins; L = Losses; SV = Saves; ERA = Earned run average; SO = Strikeouts

| Player | G | W | L | SV | ERA | SO |
|---|---|---|---|---|---|---|
| Nelson Greene | 11 | 2 | 0 | 1 | 10.64 | 4 |
| Art Decatur | 1 | 0 | 0 | 0 | 18.00 | 0 |
| Jim Roberts | 1 | 0 | 0 | 0 | 0.00 | 0 |

== Awards and honors ==
- TSN Major League All-Star Team
  - Dazzy Vance
