= Cotton Tierney =

American baseball player (1894–1953)

- Second baseman
- Born: February 10, 1894; Kansas City, Kansas, U.S.
- Died: April 18, 1953 (aged 59); Kansas City, Kansas, U.S.
- Batted: Right Threw: Right

MLB debut
- September 23, 1920, for the Pittsburgh Pirates

Last MLB appearance
- October 3, 1925, for the Brooklyn Robins

MLB statistics
- Batting average: .296
- Home runs: 31
- Runs batted in: 331
- Stats at Baseball Reference

Teams
- Pittsburgh Pirates (1920–1923); Philadelphia Phillies (1923); Boston Braves (1924); Brooklyn Robins (1925)

James Arthur "Cotton" Tierney (February 10, 1894 – April 18, 1953) was an American professional baseball second baseman and third baseman. He played in Major League Baseball (MLB) for the Pittsburgh Pirates, Philadelphia Phillies, Boston Braves, and Brooklyn Robins between 1920 and 1925. Tierney was born in Kansas City, Kansas.

== Career ==
Tierney began his professional career in minor league baseball in 1912. The Pittsburgh Pirates acquired Tierney after he played for the Tulsa Oilers of the Class A Western League. Tierney and teammates Charley Grimm, Rabbit Maranville, and George Whitted, became known as the "Banjo Boys". On October 2, 1920, he played every inning in all three games of modern baseball's only tripleheader; he is the only player to play three complete major league games in one day. (Morrie Rath is the only other player to have played in each of that day's 3 games, but Rath left the third game after two innings, before making a plate appearance.)

Tierney had a .345 batting average during the 1922 season, finishing fifth in the National League, and a .515 slugging percentage, good for fourth. He also finished fifth in triples with fourteen, tied with Rogers Hornsby. His performance earned him a $5,000 contract for the next season. However, the Pirates traded Tierney with Whitey Glazner and $50,000 to the Philadelphia Phillies for Lee Meadows and Johnny Rawlings in May 1923. In 1923, Tierney tied George Grantham for second in the NL in doubles with 36, trailing only Edd Roush, and finished seventh in home runs with 13.

On December 15, 1923, the Phillies traded Tierney to the Boston Braves for Hod Ford and Ray Powell. On February 4, 1925, the Braves traded Tierney to the Brooklyn Robins for Bernie Neis. Before the 1926 season, in what was considered "one of the most remarkable deals ever made between a major and a minor league club", the Robins traded Tierney to the Minneapolis Millers of the American Association with Ford, Dick Loftus, Bonnie Hollingsworth, and their choice of Del Bissonette, Babe Herman, and Chuck Corgan in order to acquire Johnny Butler.

Tierney managed the Pueblo Steelworkers of the Western League in 1929. He managed the Joplin Miners of the Class A Western Association in 1930.

== Legacy ==
Tierney returned to Kansas City, where he operated a bowling alley with Baseball Hall of Fame member Zack Wheat. He died in his home at the age of 59.

In 2005, Jeff Euston, Tierney's great-great-nephew, created a website tracking all salaries of MLB players, naming it "Cot's Baseball Contracts", after his baseball ancestor. Considered "the unofficial clearinghouse for MLB contracts", the website had 4 million page views by the end of 2008. In 2010, Baseball Prospectus purchased Cot's Contracts, and began hosting the site.
