= Bill Doak =

American baseball player (1891–1954)

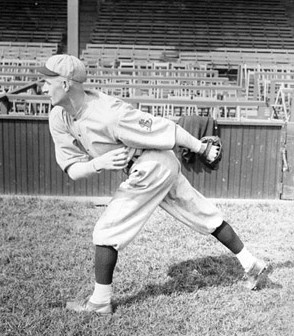
- Pitcher
- Born: January 28, 1891; Pittsburgh, Pennsylvania, U.S.
- Died: November 26, 1954 (aged 63); Bradenton, Florida, U.S.
- Batted: Right Threw: Right

MLB debut
- September 1, 1912, for the Cincinnati Reds

Last MLB appearance
- May 13, 1929, for the St. Louis Cardinals

MLB statistics
- Win–loss record: 169–157
- Earned run average: 2.98
- Strikeouts: 1,014
- Stats at Baseball Reference

Teams
- Cincinnati Reds (1912); St. Louis Cardinals (1913–1924); Brooklyn Robins (1924, 1927–1928); St. Louis Cardinals (1929)

Career highlights and awards
- 2× NL ERA leader (1914, 1921)

William Leopold Doak (January 28, 1891 – November 26, 1954) was an American Major League Baseball pitcher who played for three teams between 1912 and 1929. He spent portions of 13 seasons with the St. Louis Cardinals. He was nicknamed "Spittin' Bill" because he threw the spitball. He led the National League in earned run average in 1914, and he won 20 games in the 1920 season.

== Early life ==
Doak was born in Pittsburgh, Pennsylvania. He was the son of Bertha Schaltenbrand Doak and William E. Doak, a civil engineer. Both sides of Doak's family originated from Germany. He had one sibling, a younger sister. Doak's father pressured him to become a mining engineer, but Doak began playing semipro baseball in 1909. He was in the minor leagues by the next year, and made it to the major leagues by 1912.

== Career ==
The St. Louis Cardinals purchased Doak's contract in the summer of 1913, and he spent the majority of his career with that team. In 1914 he went 19–6 and led the league with an ERA of 1.72. Doak won 20 games in 1920, and led the NL in ERA again in 1921. On June 14, 1924, Doak was traded by the Cardinals to the Brooklyn Robins for Leo Dickerman.

He returned to St. Louis for a short time in 1929 before retiring. His lifetime record is 169–157, with an ERA of 2.98 and 1,014 strikeouts. Even though Doak played with many unremarkable teams, he is among the Cardinals' top 10 in eight pitching categories; his 32 shutouts rank second behind Bob Gibson.

Doak's main pitch, the spitball, earned him the nickname "Spittin' Bill". When the pitch was outlawed in 1920, Doak was one of 17 pitchers allowed to continue throwing the spitball.

Doak made his most lasting contribution to baseball by innovating the design of the baseball glove. In 1920, he suggested to Rawlings that a web should be laced between the first finger and thumb, saying it would create a natural pocket. The Bill Doak glove soon replaced all other baseball gloves and is the standard to this day.

== Later life ==
Doak retired to Bradenton, Florida, where he owned a candy shop (Bill Doak's Sweet Shop), and also coached the Bradenton High School baseball team, which made it to the state championship. He died in Bradenton, aged 63.

== See also ==
- List of Major League Baseball annual ERA leaders
- List of St. Louis Cardinals team records
