= Tex Wilson =

American baseball player

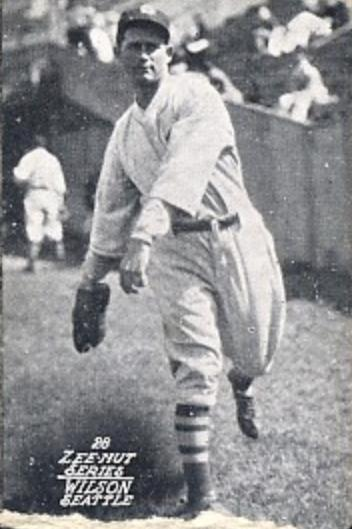
- Pitcher
- Born: July 8, 1901; Trenton, Texas, U.S.
- Died: September 15, 1946 (aged 45); Sulphur Springs, Texas, U.S.
- Batted: Right Threw: Left

MLB debut
- September 2, 1924, for the Brooklyn Robins

Last MLB appearance
- September 16, 1924, for the Brooklyn Robins

MLB statistics
- Win–loss record: 0–0
- Earned run average: 14.73
- Strikeouts: 1
- Stats at Baseball Reference

Teams
- Brooklyn Robins (1924)

Gomer Russell Wilson (July 8, 1901 in Trenton, Texas – September 15, 1946 in Sulphur Springs, Texas) was an American professional baseball pitcher. He pitched in two games in Major League Baseball for the Brooklyn Robins during the 1924 baseball season.
