= Rube Yarrison =

American baseball player

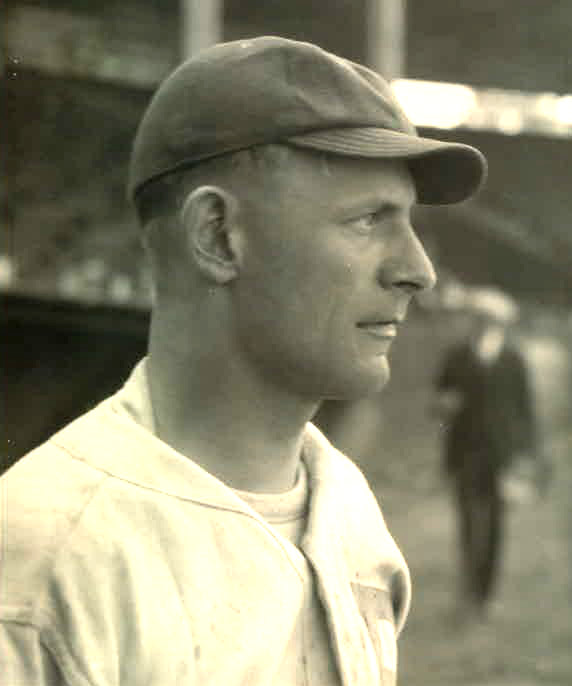
- Pitcher
- Born: March 9, 1896; Montgomery, Pennsylvania, U.S.
- Died: April 22, 1977 (aged 81); Williamsport, Pennsylvania, U.S.
- Batted: Right Threw: Right

MLB debut
- April 13, 1922, for the Philadelphia Athletics

Last MLB appearance
- May 7, 1924, for the Brooklyn Robins

MLB statistics
- Win–loss record: 1–4
- Earned run average: 7.86
- Strikeouts: 12
- Stats at Baseball Reference

Teams
- Philadelphia Athletics (1922); Brooklyn Robins (1924)

Byron Wardsworth Yarrison (March 9, 1896 – April 22, 1977) was an American professional baseball pitcher. He pitched parts of two seasons in Major League Baseball, for the Philadelphia Athletics in 1922 and the Brooklyn Robins in 1924. He attended Gettysburg College.
