= Joe Klugmann =

American baseball player (1895–1951)

- Second baseman
- Born: March 26, 1895; St. Louis, Missouri, US
- Died: July 18, 1951 (aged 56); Moberly, Missouri, US
- Batted: Right Threw: Right

MLB debut
- September 23, 1921, for the Chicago Cubs

Last MLB appearance
- July 19, 1925, for the Cleveland Indians

MLB statistics
- Batting average: .251
- Home runs: 0
- Runs batted in: 17
- Stats at Baseball Reference

Teams
- Chicago Cubs (1921–1922); Brooklyn Robins (1924); Cleveland Indians (1925)

Josie "Joe" Klugmann (March 26, 1895 – July 18, 1951) was an American professional baseball player who played second base from 1921 to 1925.

He later managed the Nashville Volunteers of the Southern Association in 1931 and 1932.
