= Tom Long (pitcher) =

American baseball player

- Pitcher
- Born: April 22, 1898; Memphis, Tennessee, U.S.
- Died: September 16, 1973 (aged 75); Louisville, Kentucky, U.S.
- Batted: Left Threw: Left

MLB debut
- April 26, 1924, for the Brooklyn Robins

Last MLB appearance
- April 26, 1924, for the Brooklyn Robins

MLB statistics
- Win–loss record: 0–0
- Earned run average: 9.00
- Strikeouts: 0
- Stats at Baseball Reference

Teams
- Brooklyn Robins (1924)

Thomas Francis Long (April 22, 1898 – September 16, 1973), nicknamed "Little Hawk", was an American pitcher in Major League Baseball. He pitched in one game for the Brooklyn Robins on April 26, 1924, working two innings and allowing two earned runs to score.
