= Bert Griffith =

American baseball player (1896-1973)

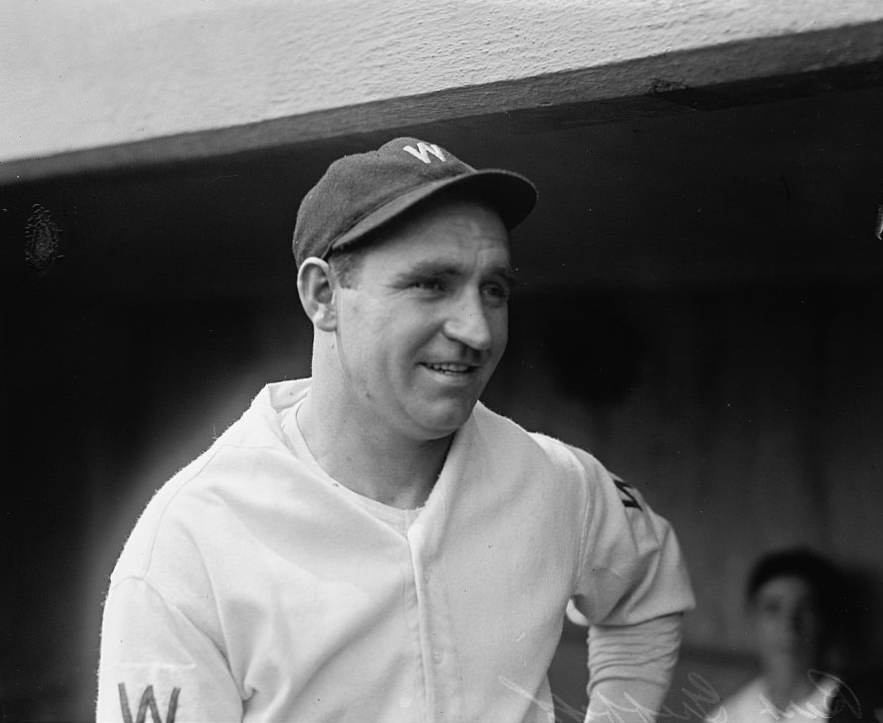
- Outfielder
- Born: March 3, 1896; St. Louis, Missouri, U.S.
- Died: May 5, 1973 (aged 77); Bishop, California, U.S.
- Batted: Right Threw: Right

MLB debut
- April 13, 1922, for the Brooklyn Robins

Last MLB appearance
- July 13, 1924, for the Washington Senators

MLB statistics
- Batting average: .299
- Home runs: 4
- Runs batted in: 72
- Stats at Baseball Reference

Teams
- Brooklyn Robins (1922–1923); Washington Senators (1924)

Bartholomew Joseph "Buck" Griffith (March 3, 1896 – May 5, 1973) was an American Major League Baseball player who played outfield for the Brooklyn Robins and Washington Senators.

Griffith started his professional baseball career in 1919. In 1921, he had a big season for the New Orleans Pelicans of the Southern Association, batting .355 and leading the league in hits with 224. He was subsequently signed by the National League Robins. Griffith spent the next two seasons as a backup outfielder before being traded to the Senators. In 1924, he hit poorly early in the season and was sent down to the minors.

In 191 games over three seasons, Griffith posted a .299 batting average (174-for-581) with 69 runs, 4 home runs and 72 RBIs. He recorded a .970 fielding percentage playing at all three outfield positions and first base.

His grandson Matt Williams had a lengthy career in the majors from 1987 to 2003 and was a five-time All-Star at third base. Williams also managed the Washington Nationals baseball club in 2014 and 2015.
