= Fred Johnston (baseball) =

American baseball player (1899-1959)

- Infielder
- Born: July 9, 1899; Charlotte, North Carolina
- Died: July 14, 1959 (aged 60); Tyler, Texas
- Batted: Right Threw: Right

MLB debut
- June 29, 1924, for the Brooklyn Robins

Last MLB appearance
- August 19, 1924, for the Brooklyn Robins

MLB statistics
- Batting average: .250
- Home runs: 0
- Runs batted in: 0
- Stats at Baseball Reference

Teams
- Brooklyn Robins (1924)

Wilfred Ivy Johnston (July 9, 1899, in Charlotte, North Carolina – July 14, 1959, in Tyler, Texas), was a professional baseball player who played infield for the Brooklyn Robins in four games during the 1924 season. He attended college at Davidson College, North Carolina State University and the University of North Carolina.
