= Gene Bailey =

American baseball player (1893–1973)

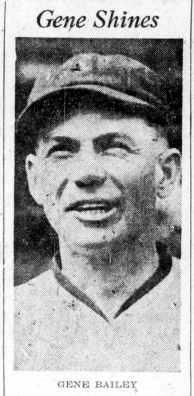
- Bailey in 1924
- Outfielder
- Born: November 25, 1893; Pearsall, Texas, U.S.
- Died: November 14, 1973 (aged 79); Houston, Texas, U.S.
- Batted: Right Threw: Right

MLB debut
- September 10, 1917, for the Philadelphia Athletics

Last MLB appearance
- June 3, 1924, for the Brooklyn Robins

MLB statistics
- Batting average: .246
- Home runs: 2
- Runs batted in: 52
- Stats at Baseball Reference

Teams
- Philadelphia Athletics (1917); Boston Braves (1919–1920); Boston Red Sox (1920); Brooklyn Robins (1923–1924)

Arthur Eugene Bailey (November 25, 1893 – November 14, 1973) was an American backup outfielder in Major League Baseball who played for the Philadelphia Athletics (1917), Boston Braves (1919–1920), Boston Red Sox (1920) and Brooklyn Robins (1923–1924). Bailey batted and threw right-handed. He was born in Pearsall, Texas.

In a five-season career, Bailey was a .246 hitter with two home runs and 52 RBI in 213 games played. His best season was 1923 when he hit .265 with 71 runs, 42 RBI, 109 hits, 11 doubles, seven triples and tallied nine stolen bases in 127 games – all career-highs.

Bailey died in Houston, Texas, at the age of 79.

== Head coaching record ==
Record table
Season	Team	Overall	Conference	Standing	Postseason
Rice Owls (Southwest Conference) (1929)
1929	Rice	9-16	7-14		
Rice:		9–16 (.360)	7–14 (.333)		
Total:		9–16 (.360)			
National champion Postseason invitational champion Conference regular season champion Conference regular season and conference tournament champion Division regular season champion Division regular season and conference tournament champion Conference tournament champion
