= Binky Jones =

American baseball player (1899-1961)

- Shortstop
- Born: July 11, 1899; St. Louis, Missouri, U.S.
- Died: May 13, 1961 (aged 61); St. Louis, Missouri, U.S.
- Batted: Right Threw: Right

MLB debut
- April 15, 1924, for the Brooklyn Robins

Last MLB appearance
- April 27, 1924, for the Brooklyn Robins

MLB statistics
- Batting average: .108
- Home runs: 0
- Runs batted in: 2
- Stats at Baseball Reference

Teams
- Brooklyn Robins (1924)

John Joseph "Binky" Jones (July 11, 1899 in St. Louis, Missouri – May 13, 1961) was an American professional baseball player who played shortstop for the Brooklyn Robins in ten games during the 1924 season.

Jones is notable for being part of one of the oddest trades in baseball history. In 1931, while a member of the minor league Chattanooga Lookouts, he was traded to the Charlotte Hornets in exchange for a turkey. The owner claimed it was because the turkey was having a better year. The turkey was promptly served for dinner to assembled sportswriters, while Jones retired and never played again.
