= Jim Roberts (baseball) =

American baseball player (1895-1984)

- Pitcher
- Born: October 13, 1895; Artesia, Mississippi, U.S.
- Died: June 24, 1984 (aged 88); Columbus, Mississippi, U.S.
- Batted: Right Threw: Right

MLB debut
- July 15, 1924, for the Brooklyn Robins

Last MLB appearance
- April 16, 1925, for the Brooklyn Robins

MLB statistics
- Win–loss record: 0–3
- Earned run average: 7.18
- Strikeouts: 10
- Stats at Baseball Reference

Teams
- Brooklyn Robins (1924–1925)

James Newsom Roberts (October 13, 1895 – June 24, 1984), nicknamed "Big Jim", was an American pitcher in Major League Baseball. He pitched in twelve games for the Brooklyn Robins during the 1924 and 1925 seasons. He attended Mississippi State University.
