= Nelson Greene (baseball) =

American baseball player (1899-1983)

- Pitcher
- Born: September 20, 1899; Philadelphia, Pennsylvania, U.S.
- Died: May 6, 1983 (aged 83); Lebanon, Pennsylvania, U.S.
- Batted: Left Threw: Left

MLB debut
- April 28, 1924, for the Brooklyn Robins

Last MLB appearance
- July 14, 1925, for the Brooklyn Robins

MLB statistics
- Win–loss record: 2–1
- Earned run average: 8.71
- Strikeouts: 7
- Stats at Baseball Reference

Teams
- Brooklyn Robins (1924–1925)

Nelson George Greene (September 20, 1899 – May 6, 1983) was an American pitcher in Major League Baseball. He pitched in fifteen games for the Brooklyn Robins during the 1924 & 1925 seasons. He attended college at Lehigh University and Villanova University.
