= Tiny Osborne =

American baseball player (1893–1969)

- Pitcher
- Born: April 9, 1893; Porterdale, Georgia, U.S.
- Died: January 5, 1969 (aged 75); Atlanta, Georgia, U.S.
- Batted: Left Threw: Right

MLB debut
- April 15, 1922, for the Chicago Cubs

Last MLB appearance
- September 28, 1925, for the Brooklyn Robins

MLB statistics
- Win–loss record: 31–40
- Earned run average: 4.72
- Strikeouts: 263
- Stats at Baseball Reference

Teams
- Chicago Cubs (1922–1924); Brooklyn Robins (1924–1925)

Earnest Preston "Tiny" Osborne (April 9, 1893 – January 5, 1969) was an American pitcher in Major League Baseball who played from 1922 to 1925 for the Chicago Cubs and Brooklyn Robins. His nickname was ironic: Osborne was listed as 6 feet 4 inches (1.93 m) tall and 215 pounds (98 kg). The native of Porterdale, Georgia, batted left-handed and threw right-handed.

In 142 big-league games pitched, including 74 starting assignments, and 646 innings, Osborne allowed 693 hits and 315 bases on balls. He registered two shutouts, 31 complete games, 263 strikeouts and seven saves. His professional career began in 1919 and ended in 1935, but he was out of "organized baseball" during 1920 and from 1928–34. His son, Bobo Osborne, was an MLB first baseman and third baseman between 1957 and 1963.
