= Art Decatur =

American baseball player (1894–1966)

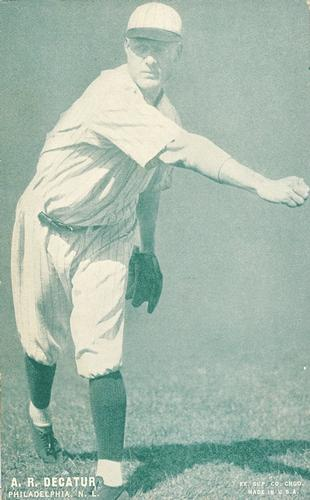
- Pitcher
- Born: January 14, 1894; Cleveland, Ohio, U.S.
- Died: April 25, 1966 (aged 72); Talladega, Alabama, U.S.
- Batted: Right Threw: Right

MLB debut
- April 15, 1922, for the Brooklyn Robins

Last MLB appearance
- October 1, 1927, for the Philadelphia Phillies

MLB statistics
- Win–loss record: 23–34
- Earned run average: 4.51
- Strikeouts: 152
- Stats at Baseball Reference

Teams
- Brooklyn Robins (1922–1925); Philadelphia Phillies (1925–1927)

Arthur Rue Decatur (January 14, 1894 – April 25, 1966) was an American pitcher in Major League Baseball. He pitched from 1922 to 1927 for the Brooklyn Robins and the Philadelphia Phillies.
