= Bonnie Hollingsworth =

American baseball player (1895–1990)

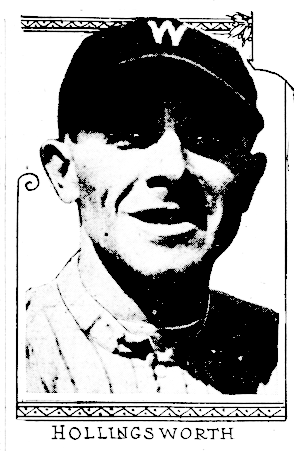
- Pitcher
- Born: December 26, 1895; Jacksboro, Tennessee, U.S.
- Died: January 4, 1990 (aged 94); Knoxville, Tennessee, U.S.
- Batted: Right Threw: Right

MLB debut
- May 30, 1922, for the Pittsburgh Pirates

Last MLB appearance
- July 18, 1928, for the Boston Braves

MLB statistics
- Win–loss record: 4-9
- Earned run average: 4.91
- Strikeouts: 50
- Stats at Baseball Reference

Teams
- Pittsburgh Pirates (1922); Washington Senators (1923); Brooklyn Robins (1924); Boston Braves (1928)

John Burnette Hollingsworth (December 26, 1895 – January 4, 1990) was an American pitcher in Major League Baseball. He pitched from 1922 to 1928.

== Professional career ==
Hollingsworth posted a 4–9 record with a 4.91 ERA in 36 games for the Pittsburgh Pirates, Washington Senators, Brooklyn Robins, and Boston Braves from 1922 to 1928.

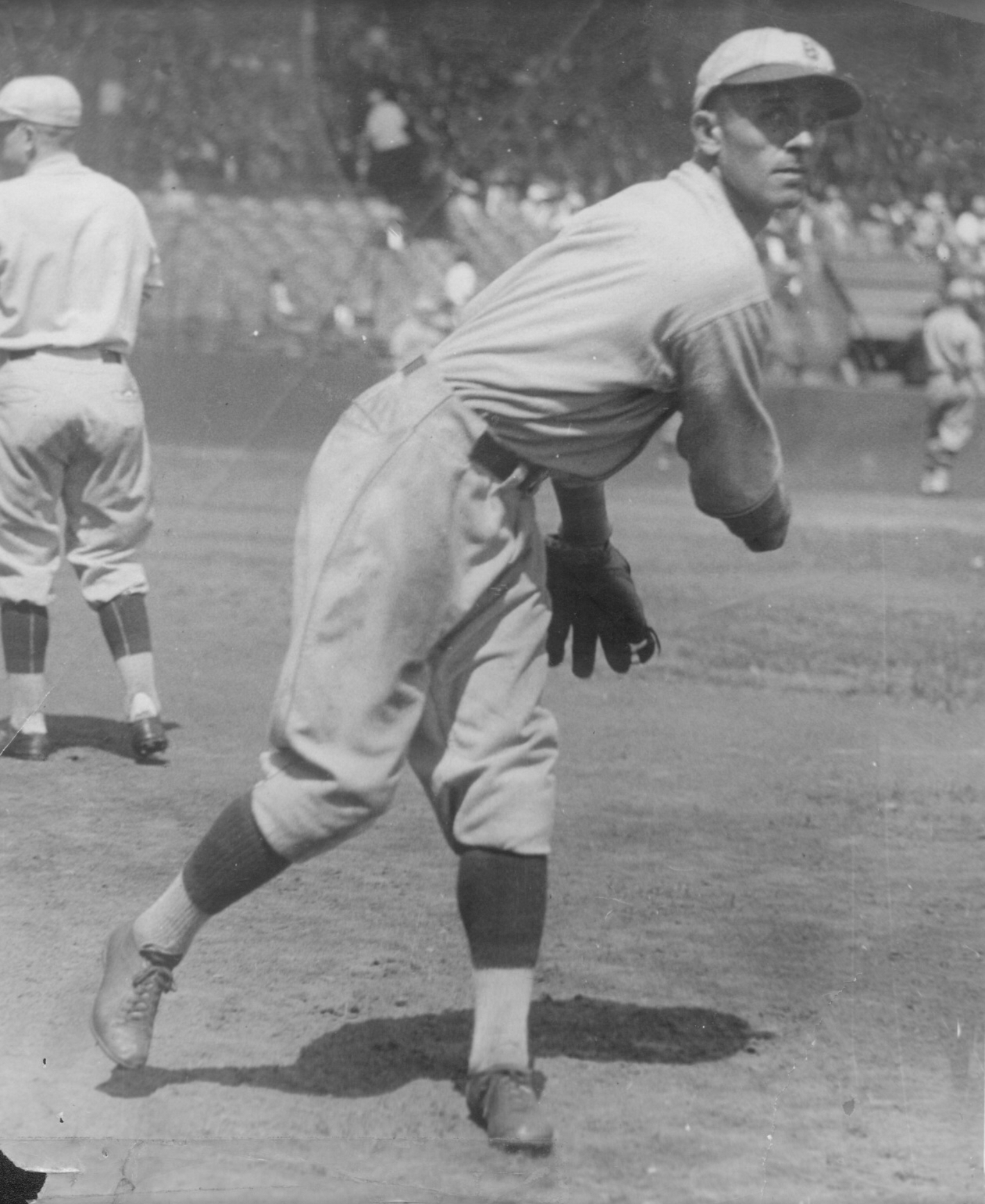
Hollingsworth warming up for the Boston Braves in 1928
