= Rube Ehrhardt =

American baseball player (1894–1980)

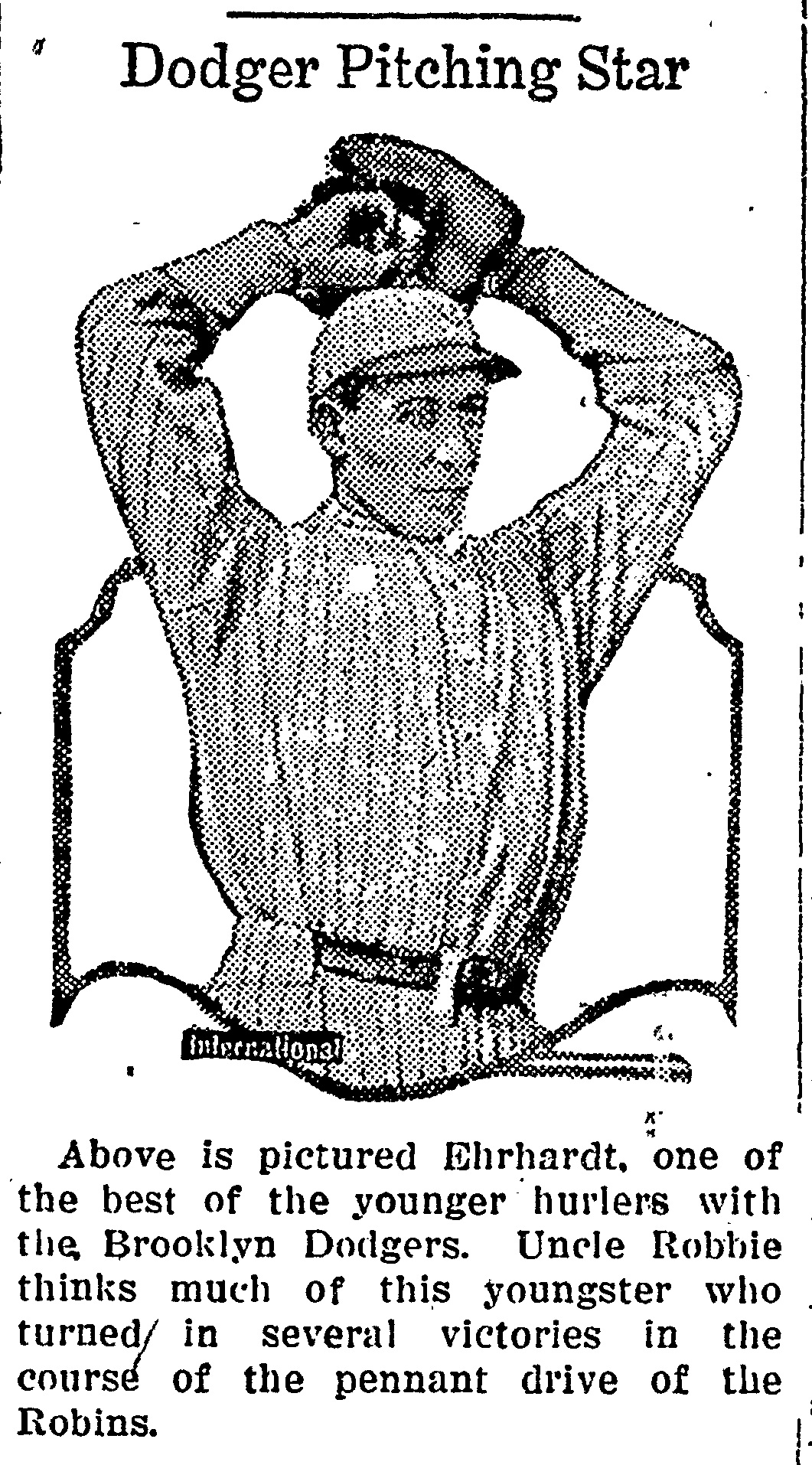
- Pitcher
- Born: November 20, 1894; Beecher, Illinois, U.S.
- Died: April 27, 1980 (aged 85); Chicago Heights, Illinois, U.S.
- Batted: Right Threw: Right

MLB debut
- July 18, 1924, for the Brooklyn Robins

Last MLB appearance
- October 5, 1929, for the Cincinnati Reds

MLB statistics
- Win–loss record: 22–34
- Earned run average: 4.15
- Strikeouts: 128
- Stats at Baseball Reference

Teams
- Brooklyn Robins (1924–1928); Cincinnati Reds (1929)

Welton Claude Ehrhardt (November 20, 1894 – April 27, 1980) was an American pitcher in Major League Baseball. He pitched from 1924 to 1929 with the Brooklyn Robins and Cincinnati Reds.

A right-hander, Ehrhardt's career was delayed while he served in the Navy in World War I, so that he was nearly 30 by the time he made his Major League debut.

Ehrhardt was the losing pitcher in that debut on July 18, 1924, throwing a complete game but losing 4–0 to Eppa Rixey and the Cincinnati Reds. A month later, Ehrhardt turned the tables, outpitching Rixey in a 9–4 victory on Aug. 17 for the Robins, all four runs allowed being unearned due to his team's four errors. Ehrhardt's next start, four days later, came in Chicago, where he shut out the Cubs 2–0 with a four-hitter, Zack Wheat driving in both of Brooklyn's runs.

After winning five games during that 1924 season, Ehrhardt had his best year in 1925, winning 10 games. Dazzy Vance (22-9), Burleigh Grimes (12-19) and Ehrhardt were the Robins' top starters that year. In his final appearance of the season, on Oct. 1, 1925, Ehrhardt was the losing pitcher but did hit his only home run. It came off Jimmy Ring in a 6–5 loss to the Philadelphia Phillies.

In 1926 and 1927, working mostly out of the bullpen, he ranked first in the National League in games finished, making 46 appearances during the 1927 season.

On April 18, 1929, Ehrhardt was traded to the Reds. He appeared in 24 games that season, all but one in relief. The start came In the final appearance of his career, on Oct. 5, 1929, when Ehrhardt pitched a complete-game shutout in Cincinnati to defeat the Cubs 9–0. It was a five-hitter, Kiki Cuyler getting two of Chicago's hits. Ehrhardt had a single at the plate in that final game.

He reportedly worked in a Chicago Heights, Illinois steel mill for 20 years following his retirement from baseball. Ehrhardt is buried in Trinity Lutheran cemetery in Crete, Illinois.
