= Leo Dickerman =

American baseball player (1896–1982)

- Pitcher
- Born: October 31, 1896; De Soto, Missouri, U.S.
- Died: April 30, 1982 (aged 85); Atkins, Arkansas, U.S.
- Batted: Right Threw: Right

MLB debut
- April 21, 1923, for the Brooklyn Robins

Last MLB appearance
- September 10, 1925, for the St. Louis Cardinals

MLB statistics
- Win–loss record: 19–27
- Earned run average: 4.00
- Strikeouts: 135
- Stats at Baseball Reference

Teams
- Brooklyn Robins (1923–1924); St. Louis Cardinals (1924–1925)

Leo Louis Dickerman (October 31, 1896 in De Soto, Missouri – April 30, 1982 in Atkins, Arkansas) was an American pitcher in Major League Baseball. He pitched for the Brooklyn Robins during the 1923 and 1924 baseball seasons and the St. Louis Cardinals in 1924 and 1925.
