= Bernie Neis =

American baseball player (1895–1972)

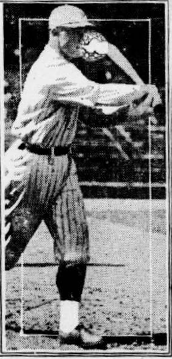
- Outfielder
- Born: September 26, 1895; Bloomington, Illinois, U.S.
- Died: November 29, 1972 (aged 77); Inverness, Florida, U.S.
- Batted: Switch Threw: Right

MLB debut
- April 14, 1920, for the Brooklyn Robins

Last MLB appearance
- October 2, 1927, for the Chicago White Sox

MLB statistics
- Batting average: .272
- Home runs: 25
- Runs batted in: 210
- Stats at Baseball Reference

Teams
- Brooklyn Robins (1920–1924); Boston Braves (1925–1926); Cleveland Indians (1927); Chicago White Sox (1927)

Bernard Edmund Neis (September 26, 1895 – November 29, 1972) was an American professional baseball outfielder. He played in Major League Baseball (MLB) for the Brooklyn Robins, Boston Braves, Cleveland Indians, and Chicago White Sox between 1920 and 1927. He managed in the minor leagues in 1932 and 1933.

In 677 games over eight seasons, Neis posted a .272 batting average (496-for-1825) with 297 runs, 25 home runs and 210 RBIs. He recorded a .950 fielding percentage playing at all three outfield positions.
