= Dick Loftus =

American baseball player (1901–1972)

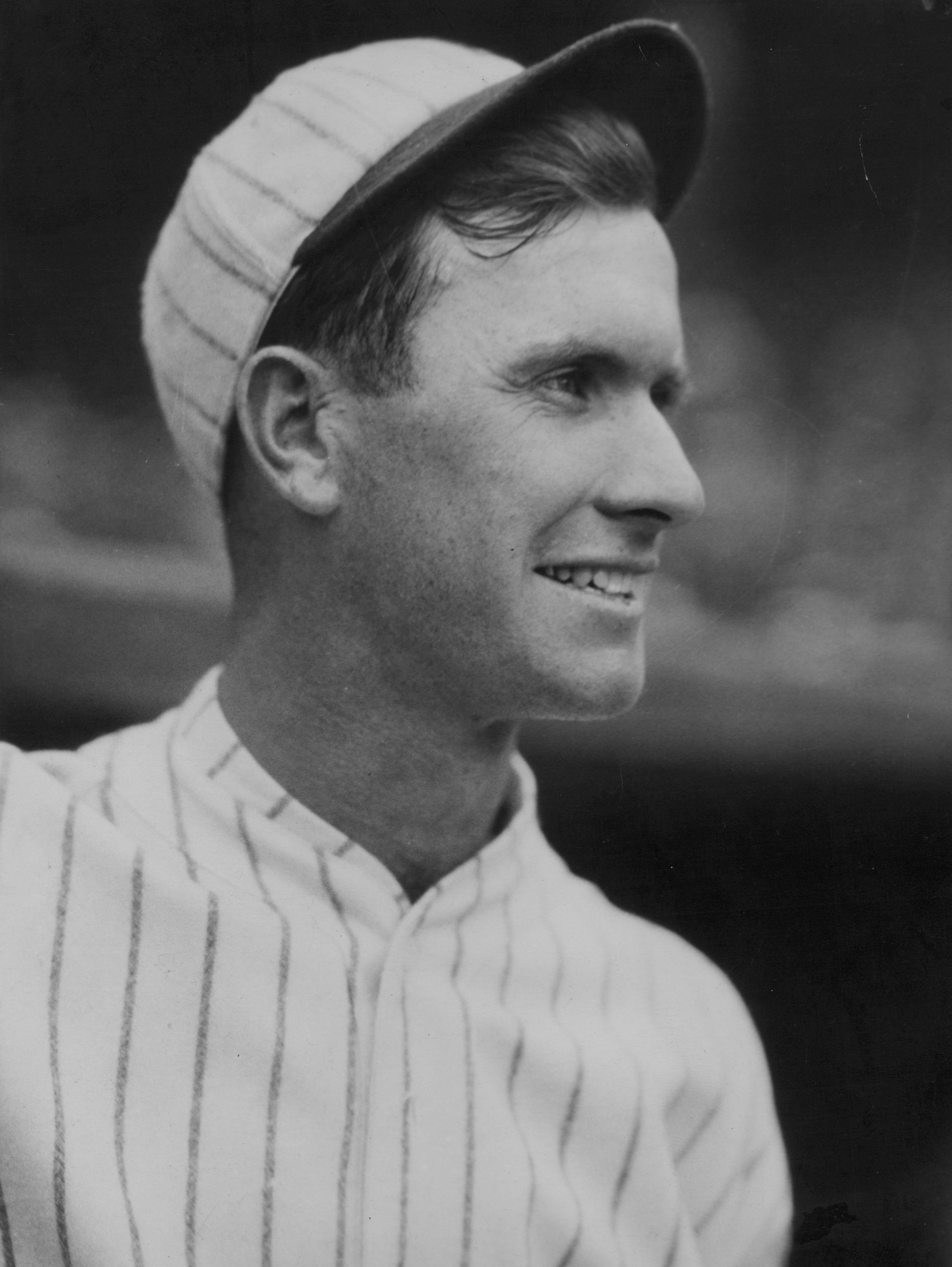
- Outfielder
- Born: March 7, 1901; Concord, Massachusetts, U.S.
- Died: January 21, 1972 (aged 70); Concord, Massachusetts, U.S.
- Batted: Left Threw: Right

MLB debut
- April 20, 1924, for the Brooklyn Robins

Last MLB appearance
- September 14, 1925, for the Brooklyn Robins

MLB statistics
- Batting average: .250
- Home runs: 0
- Runs batted in: 21
- Stats at Baseball Reference

Teams
- Brooklyn Robins (1924–1925)

Richard Joseph Loftus (March 7, 1901 – January 21, 1972) was an American professional baseball player who played outfield for the Brooklyn Robins in the 1924 and 1925 seasons.
