= 1924 Philadelphia Phillies season =

Major League Baseball season

1924 Philadelphia Phillies
- League: National League
- Ballpark: Baker Bowl
- City: Philadelphia
- Owners: William F. Baker
- Managers: Art Fletcher

The 1924 Philadelphia Phillies season saw the Phillies climb out of last place and into seventh and home attendance improving to over 299,000. Cy Williams led the team in home runs with 24.

== Offseason ==
- December 15, 1923: Cotton Tierney was traded by the Phillies to the Boston Braves for Hod Ford and Ray Powell. Powell refused to report to his new team. The Braves sent cash to the Phillies as compensation.

== Regular season ==
On August 21, 1924, the Phillies were traveling from games in St. Louis to Cincinnati when the Baltimore and Ohio Railroad train on which they were traveling turned over in the train yards in Mitchell, Indiana. Phillies players and personnel were unharmed but the engineer and fireman were killed in the accident.

In the season's final series against the New York Giants at the Polo Grounds, Phillies shortstop Heinie Sand was offered $500 by Giants outfielder Jimmy O'Connell to throw the games. The Giants were battling for the pennant with the Brooklyn Robins. Sand rejected the bribe and reported it to Phillies manager Art Fletcher. It eventually led to the life-time suspension of O'Connell and Giants coach Cozy Dolan by Commissioner Landis, although future-Hall of Famers Frankie Frisch, George Kelly, and Ross Youngs were also implicated.

=== Season standings ===
National League
Team	W	L	Pct.	GB	Home	Road
New York Giants	93	60	.608	—	51‍–‍26	42‍–‍34
Brooklyn Robins	92	62	.597	1½	46‍–‍31	46‍–‍31
Pittsburgh Pirates	90	63	.588	3	49‍–‍28	41‍–‍35
Cincinnati Reds	83	70	.542	10	43‍–‍33	40‍–‍37
Chicago Cubs	81	72	.529	12	46‍–‍31	35‍–‍41
St. Louis Cardinals	65	89	.422	28½	40‍–‍37	25‍–‍52
Philadelphia Phillies	55	96	.364	37	26‍–‍49	29‍–‍47
Boston Braves	53	100	.346	40	28‍–‍48	25‍–‍52

=== Record vs. opponents ===
1924 National League record Sources:
Team	BSN	BRO	CHC	CIN	NYG	PHI	PIT	STL
Boston	—	7–15	6–15	12–10	5–17	10–12–1	7–15	6–16
Brooklyn	15–7	—	12–10	12–10	8–14	17–5	13–9	15–7
Chicago	15–6	10–12	—	9–13	9–13–1	16–6	7–15	15–7
Cincinnati	10–12	10–12	13–9	—	9–13	16–5	12–10	13–9
New York	17–5	14–8	13–9–1	13–9	—	14–7	9–13	13–9
Philadelphia	12–10–1	5–17	6–16	5–16	7–14	—	8–13	12–10
Pittsburgh	15–7	9–13	15–7	10–12	13–9	13–8	—	15–7
St. Louis	16–6	7–15	7–15	9–13	9–13	10–12	7–15	—

=== Roster ===
1924 Philadelphia Phillies roster
Roster
Pitchers: Huck Betts; Jim Bishop; Hal Carlson; Johnny Couch; Whitey Glazner; Earl Hamilton; Bill Hubbell; Bert Lewis; Clarence Mitchell; Joe Oeschger; Lerton Pinto; Jimmy Ring; Ray Steineder; Lefty Weinert	Catchers: Butch Henline; Lew Wendell; Jimmie Wilson; Infielders: Hod Ford; Walter Holke; Lenny Metz; Frank Parkinson; Heinie Sand; Andy Woehr; Russ Wrightstone	Outfielders: Spoke Emery; George Harper; Fritz Henrich; Freddy Leach; Cliff Lee; Johnny Mokan; Joe Schultz; Curt Walker; Cy Williams	Manager: Art Fletcher; Coaches: Pat Ragan; Benny Meyer

== Player stats ==
=== Batting ===
==== Starters by position ====
Note: Pos = Position; G = Games played; AB = At bats; H = Hits; Avg. = Batting average; HR = Home runs; RBI = Runs batted in

Pos	Player	G	AB	H	Avg.	HR	RBI
C	Jimmie Wilson	95	280	78	.279	6	39
1B	Walter Holke	148	563	169	.300	6	64
2B	Hod Ford	145	530	144	.272	3	53
SS	Heinie Sand	137	539	132	.245	6	40
3B	Russ Wrightstone	118	388	119	.307	7	58
OF	Cy Williams	148	558	183	.328	24	93
OF	Johnny Mokan	96	366	95	.260	7	44
OF	George Harper	109	411	121	.294	16	55

==== Other batters ====
Note: G = Games played; AB = At bats; H = Hits; Avg. = Batting average; HR = Home runs; RBI = Runs batted in

Player	G	AB	H	Avg.	HR	RBI
Butch Henline	115	289	82	.284	5	35
Joe Schultz	88	284	80	.282	5	29
Frank Parkinson	62	156	33	.212	1	19
Andy Woehr	50	152	33	.217	0	17
Fritz Henrich	36	90	19	.211	0	4
Curt Walker	24	71	21	.296	1	8
Cliff Lee	21	56	14	.250	1	7
Lew Wendell	21	32	8	.250	0	2
Freddy Leach	8	28	13	.464	2	7
Lenny Metz	7	7	2	.286	0	1
Spoke Emery	5	3	2	.667	0	0

=== Pitching ===
==== Starting pitchers ====
Note: G = Games pitched; IP = Innings pitched; W = Wins; L = Losses; ERA = Earned run average; SO = Strikeouts

Player	G	IP	W	L	ERA	SO
Jimmy Ring	32	215.1	10	12	3.97	72
Hal Carlson	38	203.2	8	17	4.86	66
Clarence Mitchell	30	165.0	6	13	5.62	36
Whitey Glazner	35	156.2	7	16	5.92	41

==== Other pitchers ====
Note: G = Games pitched; IP = Innings pitched; W = Wins; L = Losses; ERA = Earned run average; SO = Strikeouts

Player	G	IP	W	L	ERA	SO
Bill Hubbell	36	179.0	10	9	4.83	30
Huck Betts	37	144.1	7	10	4.30	46
Johnny Couch	37	137.0	4	8	4.73	23
Joe Oeschger	19	65.1	2	7	4.41	8
Jim Bishop	7	16.2	0	1	6.48	3
Lefty Weinert	8	14.2	0	1	2.45	7

==== Relief pitchers ====
Note: G = Games pitched; W = Wins; L = Losses; SV = Saves; ERA = Earned run average; SO = Strikeouts

Player	G	W	L	SV	ERA	SO
Bert Lewis	12	0	0	0	6.00	3
Ray Steineder	9	1	1	0	4.40	11
Earl Hamilton	3	0	1	0	10.50	2
Lerton Pinto	3	0	0	0	9.00	1
