= 1924 St. Louis Cardinals season =

Major League Baseball season

1924 St. Louis Cardinals
- League: National League
- Ballpark: Sportsman's Park
- City: St. Louis, Missouri
- Record: 65–89 (.422)
- League place: 6th
- Owners: Sam Breadon
- Managers: Branch Rickey

The 1924 St. Louis Cardinals season was the team's 43rd season in St. Louis, Missouri and its 33rd season in the National League. The Cardinals went 65–89 during the season and finished sixth in the National League.

== Regular season ==
Rogers Hornsby hit an astonishing.424 in 1924, which remains the modern National League record for batting average in a single season. He also led the league with 89 walks, producing a.507 on-base percentage that was the highest in the National League during the 20th century. His slugging percentage of.696 again led the league, as did his 121 runs scored, 227 hits, and 43 doubles.

=== Season standings ===
National League
| Team | W | L | Pct. | GB | Home | Road |
|---|---|---|---|---|---|---|
| New York Giants | 93 | 60 | .608 | — | 51‍–‍26 | 42‍–‍34 |
| Brooklyn Robins | 92 | 62 | .597 | 1½ | 46‍–‍31 | 46‍–‍31 |
| Pittsburgh Pirates | 90 | 63 | .588 | 3 | 49‍–‍28 | 41‍–‍35 |
| Cincinnati Reds | 83 | 70 | .542 | 10 | 43‍–‍33 | 40‍–‍37 |
| Chicago Cubs | 81 | 72 | .529 | 12 | 46‍–‍31 | 35‍–‍41 |
| St. Louis Cardinals | 65 | 89 | .422 | 28½ | 40‍–‍37 | 25‍–‍52 |
| Philadelphia Phillies | 55 | 96 | .364 | 37 | 26‍–‍49 | 29‍–‍47 |
| Boston Braves | 53 | 100 | .346 | 40 | 28‍–‍48 | 25‍–‍52 |

=== Record vs. opponents ===
1924 National League record Sources:
| Team | BSN | BRO | CHC | CIN | NYG | PHI | PIT | STL |
|---|---|---|---|---|---|---|---|---|
| Boston | — | 7–15 | 6–15 | 12–10 | 5–17 | 10–12–1 | 7–15 | 6–16 |
| Brooklyn | 15–7 | — | 12–10 | 12–10 | 8–14 | 17–5 | 13–9 | 15–7 |
| Chicago | 15–6 | 10–12 | — | 9–13 | 9–13–1 | 16–6 | 7–15 | 15–7 |
| Cincinnati | 10–12 | 10–12 | 13–9 | — | 9–13 | 16–5 | 12–10 | 13–9 |
| New York | 17–5 | 14–8 | 13–9–1 | 13–9 | — | 14–7 | 9–13 | 13–9 |
| Philadelphia | 12–10–1 | 5–17 | 6–16 | 5–16 | 7–14 | — | 8–13 | 12–10 |
| Pittsburgh | 15–7 | 9–13 | 15–7 | 10–12 | 13–9 | 13–8 | — | 15–7 |
| St. Louis | 16–6 | 7–15 | 7–15 | 9–13 | 9–13 | 10–12 | 7–15 | — |

=== Notable transactions ===
- September 3, 1924: Tommy Thevenow was purchased by the Cardinals from the Syracuse Stars.

=== Roster ===
1924 St. Louis Cardinals
Roster
| Pitchers: Hi Bell; Jack Berly; Pea Ridge Day; Art Delaney; Leo Dickerman; Bill Doak; Eddie Dyer; Jesse Fowler; Jesse Haines; Lou North; Jeff Pfeffer; Flint Rhem; Bill Sherdel; Vince Shields; Allen Sothoron; Johnny Stuart; Bob Vines | Catchers: Verne Clemons; Mike González; Charlie Niebergall; Ray Shepardson; Ernie Vick; Infielders: Les Bell; Jim Bottomley; Jimmy Cooney; Howard Freigau; Rogers Hornsby; Doc Lavan; Tommy Thevenow; Specs Toporcer | Outfielders: Ray Blades; Joe Bratcher; Ed Clough; Taylor Douthit; Max Flack; Chick Hafey; Wattie Holm; Heinie Mueller; Hy Myers; Joe Schultz; Jack Smith | Manager: Branch Rickey; Coaches: Burt Shotton; Joe Sugden; Tink Turner |

== Player stats ==
| = Indicates team leader |

| = Indicates league leader |

=== Batting ===
==== Starters by position ====
Note: Pos = Position; G = Games played; AB = At bats; H = Hits; Avg. = Batting average; HR = Home runs; RBI = Runs batted in

| Pos | Player | G | AB | H | Avg. | HR | RBI |
|---|---|---|---|---|---|---|---|
| C | Mike González | 120 | 402 | 119 | .296 | 3 | 53 |
| 1B | Jim Bottomley | 137 | 528 | 167 | .316 | 14 | 111 |
| 2B | Rogers Hornsby | 143 | 536 | 227 | .424 | 25 | 94 |
| SS | Jimmy Cooney | 110 | 383 | 113 | .295 | 1 | 57 |
| 3B | Howard Freigau | 98 | 376 | 101 | .269 | 2 | 39 |
| OF | Jack Smith | 124 | 459 | 130 | .283 | 2 | 33 |
| OF | Ray Blades | 131 | 456 | 142 | .311 | 11 | 68 |
| OF | Wattie Holm | 81 | 293 | 86 | .294 | 0 | 23 |

==== Other batters ====
Note: G = Games played; AB = At bats; H = Hits; Avg. = Batting average; HR = Home runs; RBI = Runs batted in

| Player | G | AB | H | Avg. | HR | RBI |
|---|---|---|---|---|---|---|
| Heinie Mueller | 92 | 296 | 78 | .264 | 2 | 37 |
| Max Flack | 67 | 209 | 55 | .263 | 2 | 21 |
| Specs Toporcer | 70 | 198 | 62 | .313 | 1 | 24 |
| Taylor Douthit | 53 | 173 | 48 | .277 | 0 | 13 |
| Hy Myers | 43 | 124 | 26 | .210 | 1 | 15 |
| Chick Hafey | 24 | 91 | 23 | .253 | 2 | 22 |
| Tommy Thevenow | 23 | 89 | 18 | .202 | 0 | 7 |
| Charlie Niebergall | 40 | 58 | 17 | .293 | 0 | 7 |
| Les Bell | 17 | 57 | 14 | .246 | 1 | 5 |
| Verne Clemons | 25 | 56 | 18 | .321 | 0 | 6 |
| Ernie Vick | 16 | 23 | 8 | .348 | 0 | 0 |
| Ed Clough | 7 | 14 | 1 | .071 | 0 | 1 |
| Joe Schultz | 12 | 12 | 2 | .167 | 0 | 2 |
| Doc Lavan | 4 | 6 | 0 | .000 | 0 | 0 |
| Ray Shepardson | 3 | 6 | 0 | .000 | 0 | 0 |
| Joe Bratcher | 4 | 1 | 0 | .000 | 0 | 0 |

=== Pitching ===
==== Starting pitchers ====
Note: G = Games pitched; IP = Innings pitched; W = Wins; L = Losses; ERA = Earned run average; SO = Strikeouts

| Player | G | IP | W | L | ERA | SO |
|---|---|---|---|---|---|---|
| Jesse Haines | 35 | 222.2 | 8 | 19 | 4.41 | 69 |
| Allan Sothoron | 29 | 196.2 | 10 | 16 | 3.57 | 62 |
| Johnny Stuart | 28 | 159.0 | 9 | 11 | 4.75 | 54 |
| Leo Dickerman | 18 | 119.2 | 7 | 4 | 2.41 | 28 |
| Jeff Pfeffer | 16 | 78.0 | 4 | 5 | 5.31 | 20 |
| Pea Ridge Day | 3 | 17.2 | 1 | 1 | 4.58 | 3 |

==== Other pitchers ====
Note: G = Games pitched; IP = Innings pitched; W = Wins; L = Losses; ERA = Earned run average; SO = Strikeouts

| Player | G | IP | W | L | ERA | SO |
|---|---|---|---|---|---|---|
| Bill Sherdel | 35 | 168.2 | 8 | 9 | 3.42 | 57 |
| Eddie Dyer | 29 | 136.2 | 8 | 11 | 4.61 | 23 |
| Hi Bell | 28 | 113.1 | 3 | 6 | 4.92 | 29 |
| Jesse Fowler | 13 | 32.2 | 1 | 1 | 4.41 | 5 |
| Flint Rhem | 6 | 32.1 | 2 | 2 | 4.45 | 20 |
| Art Delaney | 8 | 20.0 | 1 | 0 | 1.80 | 2 |
| Lou North | 6 | 14.2 | 0 | 0 | 6.75 | 8 |
| Vince Shields | 2 | 12.0 | 1 | 1 | 3.00 | 4 |

==== Relief pitchers ====
Note: G = Games pitched; W = Wins; L = Losses; SV = Saves; ERA = Earned run average; SO = Strikeouts

| Player | G | W | L | SV | ERA | SO |
|---|---|---|---|---|---|---|
| Bill Doak | 11 | 2 | 1 | 3 | 3.27 | 7 |
| Jack Berly | 4 | 0 | 0 | 0 | 5.62 | 2 |
| Bob Vines | 2 | 0 | 0 | 0 | 9.28 | 0 |

== Awards and honors ==
=== League leaders ===
- Rogers Hornsby, National League batting champion
- Rogers Hornsby led the National League in hits, doubles, runs, walks, slugging and on-base percentage

=== Records ===
- Rogers Hornsby, National League record, Best batting average by a second baseman, (.424).

== Farm system ==
| Level | Team | League | Manager |
|---|---|---|---|
| AA | Syracuse Stars | International League | Frank Shaughnessy |
| A | Houston Buffaloes | Texas League | Hunter Hill and Marv Goodwin |
| C | Fort Smith Twins | Western Association | Runt Marr |
| D | Sioux City Cardinals | Tri-State League | Joe McDermott |

Tri-State League folded, July 17, 1924
