= 1924 Pittsburgh Pirates season =

1924 Pittsburgh Pirates
- League: National League
- Ballpark: Forbes Field
- City: Pittsburgh
- Owners: Barney Dreyfuss
- Managers: Bill McKechnie

Caption text says "Giants Win.- The New York boys took measure of the Pittsburgh Pirates yesterday by a score of 3-1 at the Polo grounds. Southworth is shown safe at first in second inning when Pirate first baseman muffed the ball."

The 1924 Pittsburgh Pirates season was the 43rd season of the Pittsburgh Pirates franchise; the 38th in the National League. The Pirates finished third in the league standings with a record of 90–63.

== Regular season ==
=== Season standings ===
National League
Team	W	L	Pct.	GB	Home	Road
New York Giants	93	60	.608	—	51‍–‍26	42‍–‍34
Brooklyn Robins	92	62	.597	1½	46‍–‍31	46‍–‍31
Pittsburgh Pirates	90	63	.588	3	49‍–‍28	41‍–‍35
Cincinnati Reds	83	70	.542	10	43‍–‍33	40‍–‍37
Chicago Cubs	81	72	.529	12	46‍–‍31	35‍–‍41
St. Louis Cardinals	65	89	.422	28½	40‍–‍37	25‍–‍52
Philadelphia Phillies	55	96	.364	37	26‍–‍49	29‍–‍47
Boston Braves	53	100	.346	40	28‍–‍48	25‍–‍52

=== Record vs. opponents ===
1924 National League record Sources:
Team	BSN	BRO	CHC	CIN	NYG	PHI	PIT	STL
Boston	—	7–15	6–15	12–10	5–17	10–12–1	7–15	6–16
Brooklyn	15–7	—	12–10	12–10	8–14	17–5	13–9	15–7
Chicago	15–6	10–12	—	9–13	9–13–1	16–6	7–15	15–7
Cincinnati	10–12	10–12	13–9	—	9–13	16–5	12–10	13–9
New York	17–5	14–8	13–9–1	13–9	—	14–7	9–13	13–9
Philadelphia	12–10–1	5–17	6–16	5–16	7–14	—	8–13	12–10
Pittsburgh	15–7	9–13	15–7	10–12	13–9	13–8	—	15–7
St. Louis	16–6	7–15	7–15	9–13	9–13	10–12	7–15	—

=== Game log ===
1924 Game Log: 90–63 (Home: 49–28; Away: 41–35)
April: 6–8 (Home: 1–2; Away: 5–6)

#	Date	Opponent	Score	Win	Loss	Save	Attendance	Record
1	April 15	@ Reds	5–6	Sheehan	**Meadows** (0–1)	—	35,747	0–1
2	April 16	@ Reds	1–0	**Cooper** (1–0)	Luque	—	—	1–1
3	April 18	@ Reds	2–3	May	**Kremer** (0–1)	—	—	1–2
4	April 19	@ Cardinals	4–2	**Meadows** (1–1)	Pfeffer	—	—	2–2
5	April 20	@ Cardinals	2–3	Doak	**Morrison** (0–1)	—	—	2–3
6	April 21	@ Cardinals	9–11	Sherdel	**Steineder** (0–1)	Doak	2,000	2–4
7	April 22	@ Cardinals	10–7	**Kremer** (1–1)	Dyer	—	2,000	3–4
8	April 24	Reds	4–5	Donohue	**Meadows** (1–2)	—	28,000	3–5
9	April 25	Reds	4–10	Luque	**Morrison** (0–2)	—	—	3–6
10	April 26	Reds	2–0	**Kremer** (2–1)	Mays	—	26,000	4–6
11	April 27	@ Cubs	2–4	Kaufmann	**Lundgren** (0–1)	—	4,000	4–7
12	April 28	@ Cubs	7–4	**Cooper** (2–0)	Keen	—	—	5–7
13	April 29	@ Cubs	1–2 (11)	Alexander	**Meadows** (1–3)	—	12,000	5–8
14	April 30	@ Cubs	2–1 (14)	**Morrison** (1–2)	Jacobs	—	5,000	6–8

May: 13–12 (Home: 11–8; Away: 2–4)

#	Date	Opponent	Score	Win	Loss	Save	Attendance	Record
15	May 1	Cardinals	8–6	**Kremer** (3–1)	Haines	—	5,000	7–8
16	May 2	Cardinals	3–2	**Cooper** (3–0)	Pfeffer	—	4,000	8–8
17	May 3	Cardinals	6–5	**Stone** (1–0)	Stuart	—	8,000	9–8
18	May 4	@ Reds	0–2	Luque	**Meadows** (1–4)	—	—	9–9
19	May 4	@ Reds	4–5	May	**Morrison** (1–3)	—	—	9–10
20	May 6	Cubs	2–0	**Kremer** (4–1)	Aldridge	—	—	10–10
21	May 7	Cubs	1–5	Kaufmann	**Cooper** (3–1)	—	8,000	10–11
22	May 9	Braves	7–10	McNamara	**Morrison** (1–4)	Genewich	—	10–12
23	May 10	Braves	0–2	Barnes	**Kremer** (4–2)	—	—	10–13
24	May 13	Braves	5–1	**Cooper** (4–1)	Marquard	—	—	11–13
25	May 15	Phillies	4–3	**Morrison** (2–4)	Couch	—	—	12–13
26	May 16	Phillies	3–4 (10)	Betts	**Kremer** (4–3)	—	—	12–14
27	May 17	Phillies	8–12	Couch	**Cooper** (4–2)	—	—	12–15
28	May 19	Giants	6–3	**Morrison** (3–4)	Watson	—	15,000	13–15
29	May 20	Giants	12–3	**Meadows** (2–4)	Dean	—	15,000	14–15
30	May 21	Giants	8–10	Bentley	**Kremer** (4–4)	McQuillan	20,000	14–16
31	May 22	Robins	2–4	Vance	**Cooper** (4–3)	—	3,000	14–17
32	May 23	Robins	1–3	Grimes	**Morrison** (3–5)	—	5,000	14–18
33	May 25	@ Robins	5–2 (11)	**Meadows** (3–4)	Ruether	—	26,000	15–18
34	May 27	@ Cubs	5–4 (10)	**Morrison** (4–5)	Kaufmann	—	—	16–18
35	May 28	@ Cubs	6–9	Aldridge	**Cooper** (4–4)	—	—	16–19
36	May 29	@ Cubs	2–5	Keen	**Morrison** (4–6)	—	—	16–20
37	May 30	Cardinals	4–0	**Cooper** (5–4)	Haines	—	10,000	17–20
38	May 30	Cardinals	3–2 (15)	**Kremer** (5–4)	Bell	—	18,000	18–20
39	May 31	Cardinals	7–0	**Yde** (1–0)	Pfeffer	—	9,000	19–20

June: 14–10 (Home: 7–0; Away: 7–10)

#	Date	Opponent	Score	Win	Loss	Save	Attendance	Record
40	June 1	@ Cubs	1–2	Aldridge	**Morrison** (4–7)	—	12,000	19–21
41	June 2	Cardinals	6–2	**Kremer** (6–4)	Dyer	**Cooper** (1)	3,000	20–21
42	June 5	@ Robins	2–6	Vance	**Cooper** (5–5)	—	4,000	20–22
43	June 7	@ Robins	1–4	Grimes	**Meadows** (3–5)	—	12,000	20–23
44	June 8	@ Giants	0–7 (5)	Watson	**Morrison** (4–8)	—	20,000	20–24
45	June 9	@ Giants	4–6	Oeschger	**Cooper** (5–6)	Barnes	10,000	20–25
46	June 10	@ Giants	10–6	**Stone** (2–0)	Barnes	**Morrison** (1)	10,000	21–25
47	June 11	@ Giants	4–2	**Meadows** (4–5)	McQuillan	—	10,000	22–25
48	June 14	@ Phillies	1–3	Ring	**Morrison** (4–9)	—	—	22–26
49	June 16	@ Braves	4–9	Barnes	**Cooper** (5–7)	—	—	22–27
50	June 17	@ Braves	5–2	**Kremer** (7–4)	Yeargin	—	—	23–27
51	June 17	@ Braves	0–1	McNamara	**Meadows** (4–6)	—	12,000	23–28
52	June 18	@ Braves	4–3	**Yde** (2–0)	Benton	—	2,500	24–28
53	June 20	Reds	9–4	**Kremer** (8–4)	Rixey	—	—	25–28
54	June 21	Reds	1–0	**Meadows** (5–6)	Sheehan	—	15,000	26–28
55	June 22	@ Reds	4–9	Benton	**Morrison** (4–10)	—	8,513	26–29
56	June 23	@ Reds	4–2	**Cooper** (6–7)	Luque	—	—	27–29
57	June 24	@ Reds	4–3	**Kremer** (9–4)	Rixey	—	—	28–29
58	June 25	Cubs	8–7 (14)	**Yde** (3–0)	Alexander	—	7,000	29–29
59	June 26	Cubs	2–1	**Morrison** (5–10)	Aldridge	—	—	30–29
60	June 27	Cubs	9–0	**Cooper** (7–7)	Jacobs	—	—	31–29
61	June 28	Cubs	3–0	**Kremer** (10–4)	Keen	—	—	32–29
62	June 29	@ Cardinals	6–5	**Meadows** (6–6)	Dickerman	**Morrison** (2)	—	33–29
63	June 30	@ Cardinals	5–7	Sherdel	**Stone** (2–1)	—	3,500	33–30

July: 19–11 (Home: 11–10; Away: 8–1)

#	Date	Opponent	Score	Win	Loss	Save	Attendance	Record
64	July 1	@ Cardinals	2–5	Stuart	**Morrison** (5–11)	—	—	33–31
65	July 2	@ Cardinals	3–2	**Cooper** (8–7)	Haines	—	2,000	34–31
66	July 4	Reds	0–8	Luque	**Kremer** (10–5)	—	—	34–32
67	July 4	Reds	2–4	Rixey	**Meadows** (6–7)	Benton	—	34–33
68	July 5	Reds	11–4	**Stone** (3–1)	Donohue	—	—	35–33
69	July 6	@ Reds	9–2	**Cooper** (9–7)	May	—	10,000	36–33
70	July 7	Robins	9–5	**Yde** (4–0)	Grimes	—	—	37–33
71	July 8	Braves	8–3	**Morrison** (6–11)	McNamara	—	—	38–33
72	July 9	Braves	3–6	Genewich	**Kremer** (10–6)	—	5,000	38–34
73	July 10	Braves	3–5	Barnes	**Meadows** (6–8)	—	—	38–35
74	July 11	Braves	8–2	**Cooper** (10–7)	Lucas	—	—	39–35
75	July 12	Phillies	6–5 (10)	**Stone** (4–1)	Mitchell	—	—	40–35
76	July 12	Phillies	3–2 (11)	**Yde** (5–0)	Hubbell	—	—	41–35
77	July 14	Phillies	3–8	Carlson	**Kremer** (10–7)	—	3,000	41–36
78	July 15	Phillies	3–1	**Meadows** (7–8)	Glazner	—	3,000	42–36
79	July 16	Giants	7–8	Ryan	**Cooper** (10–8)	Jonnard	15,000	42–37
80	July 17	Giants	4–3 (13)	**Morrison** (7–11)	McQuillan	—	15,000	43–37
81	July 18	Giants	9–2	**Cooper** (11–8)	Bentley	—	12,000	44–37
82	July 19	Giants	6–10	Watson	**Meadows** (7–9)	—	31,000	44–38
83	July 21	Robins	2–6	Vance	**Meadows** (7–10)	—	8,000	44–39
84	July 21	Robins	4–2	**Kremer** (11–7)	Grimes	—	12,000	45–39
85	July 22	Robins	1–4 (5)	Osborne	**Morrison** (7–12)	—	4,000	45–40
86	July 23	Robins	3–4 (10)	Decatur	**Cooper** (11–9)	—	4,000	45–41
87	July 24	Robins	8–1	**Yde** (6–0)	Roberts	—	3,500	46–41
88	July 25	@ Braves	2–1	**Pfeffer** (1–0)	Genewich	—	2,000	47–41
89	July 26	@ Braves	7–6 (14)	**Cooper** (12–9)	Barnes	—	—	48–41
90	July 28	@ Braves	5–2	**Yde** (7–0)	Yeargin	—	—	49–41
91	July 29	@ Braves	8–1	**Kremer** (12–7)	Genewich	—	—	50–41
92	July 30	@ Giants	6–3	**Cooper** (13–9)	Jonnard	—	10,000	51–41
93	July 31	@ Giants	5–0 (6)	**Meadows** (8–10)	Watson	—	6,000	52–41

August: 21–10 (Home: 11–7; Away: 10–3)

#	Date	Opponent	Score	Win	Loss	Save	Attendance	Record
94	August 1	@ Giants	1–3	Barnes	**Morrison** (7–13)	—	8,000	52–42
95	August 2	@ Giants	7–6	**Kremer** (13–7)	Dean	—	25,000	53–42
96	August 3	@ Robins	5–2	**Yde** (8–0)	Grimes	—	—	54–42
97	August 4	@ Robins	5–3	**Cooper** (14–9)	Osborne	—	3,000	55–42
98	August 5	@ Robins	8–1	**Kremer** (14–7)	Ruether	—	4,500	56–42
99	August 6	@ Robins	3–5	Vance	**Stone** (4–2)	—	4,500	56–43
100	August 7	@ Robins	6–9	Grimes	**Yde** (8–1)	—	4,000	56–44
101	August 8	@ Phillies	1–0	**Meadows** (9–10)	Ring	—	—	57–44
102	August 9	@ Phillies	16–4	**Cooper** (15–9)	Oeschger	—	—	58–44
103	August 9	@ Phillies	7–0	**Kremer** (15–7)	Mitchell	—	—	59–44
104	August 11	@ Phillies	7–3	**Yde** (9–1)	Glazner	—	—	60–44
105	August 11	@ Phillies	6–4	**Pfeffer** (2–0)	Betts	**Kremer** (1)	—	61–44
106	August 13	Giants	4–2	**Meadows** (10–10)	Barnes	—	20,000	62–44
107	August 14	Giants	3–1	**Cooper** (16–9)	McQuillan	—	25,000	63–44
108	August 15	Giants	6–4	**Kremer** (16–7)	Nehf	—	24,000	64–44
109	August 16	Giants	5–4 (12)	**Morrison** (8–13)	Barnes	—	33,500	65–44
110	August 18	Robins	4–7	Grimes	**Pfeffer** (2–1)	—	8,000	65–45
111	August 19	Robins	3–4	Vance	**Cooper** (16–10)	—	16,000	65–46
112	August 20	Robins	2–3 (11)	Doak	**Kremer** (16–8)	—	5,000	65–47
113	August 21	Braves	6–7	Lucas	**Morrison** (8–14)	Benton	—	65–48
114	August 21	Braves	5–0	**Yde** (10–1)	Cooney	—	—	66–48
115	August 22	Braves	3–0	**Cooper** (17–10)	Benton	—	—	67–48
116	August 23	Braves	3–2	**Kremer** (17–8)	Yeargin	—	—	68–48
117	August 25	Phillies	7–4	**Meadows** (11–10)	Oeschger	—	—	69–48
118	August 26	Phillies	6–1	**Yde** (11–1)	Ring	—	—	70–48
119	August 26	Phillies	1–3	Hubbell	**Morrison** (8–15)	—	—	70–49
120	August 27	Phillies	6–7	Carlson	**Pfeffer** (2–2)	Couch	—	70–50
121	August 28	Reds	4–5	Mays	**Cooper** (17–11)	—	—	70–51
122	August 29	Reds	5–4	**Morrison** (9–15)	Sheehan	—	—	71–51
123	August 30	Reds	12–3	**Cooper** (18–11)	Rixey	—	—	72–51
124	August 31	@ Cubs	2–0	**Yde** (12–1)	Jacobs	—	20,000	73–51

September: 17–12 (Home: 8–1; Away: 9–11)

#	Date	Opponent	Score	Win	Loss	Save	Attendance	Record
125	September 1	Cubs	5–4 (10)	**Morrison** (10–15)	Wheeler	—	20,000	74–51
126	September 1	Cubs	4–3	**Adams** (1–0)	Aldridge	—	40,000	75–51
127	September 3	Cardinals	14–1	**Cooper** (19–11)	Bell	—	4,500	76–51
128	September 4	Cardinals	5–9	Sothoron	**Kremer** (17–9)	—	4,000	76–52
129	September 6	Cardinals	5–2	**Yde** (13–1)	Stuart	—	10,000	77–52
130	September 6	Cardinals	12–5	**Pfeffer** (3–2)	Rhem	—	—	78–52
131	September 7	@ Reds	1–4	Luque	**Cooper** (19–12)	—	—	78–53
132	September 7	@ Reds	3–4	Mays	**Adams** (1–1)	—	—	78–54
133	September 9	@ Cardinals	4–7	Sothoron	**Yde** (13–2)	—	2,000	78–55
134	September 9	@ Cardinals	4–6	Stuart	**Morrison** (10–16)	—	3,500	78–56
135	September 10	@ Cardinals	3–1	**Adams** (2–1)	Haines	—	1,000	79–56
136	September 12	@ Braves	5–4	**Pfeffer** (4–2)	Barnes	—	2,000	80–56
137	September 13	@ Braves	7–0	**Yde** (14–2)	Graham	—	5,000	81–56
138	September 15	@ Braves	4–3 (12)	**Morrison** (11–16)	Cooney	—	—	82–56
139	September 16	@ Phillies	5–6	Hubbell	**Cooper** (19–13)	Betts	—	82–57
140	September 16	@ Phillies	13–7	**Meadows** (12–10)	Ring	—	—	83–57
141	September 18	@ Phillies	5–6	Oeschger	**Kremer** (17–10)	—	—	83–58
142	September 18	@ Phillies	6–3	**Meadows** (13–10)	Carlson	—	—	84–58
143	September 19	@ Robins	4–2	**Yde** (15–2)	Ehrhardt	—	12,000	85–58
144	September 20	@ Robins	5–4 (11)	**Cooper** (20–13)	Vance	—	30,000	86–58
145	September 21	@ Robins	1–2 (10)	Grimes	**Pfeffer** (4–3)	—	28,000	86–59
146	September 23	@ Giants	1–5	McQuillan	**Meadows** (13–11)	—	30,000	86–60
147	September 24	@ Giants	2–4	Barnes	**Yde** (15–3)	—	25,000	86–61
148	September 25	@ Giants	4–5	Nehf	**Cooper** (20–14)	—	25,000	86–62
149	September 26	Cubs	9–3	**Kremer** (18–10)	Keen	—	—	87–62
150	September 26	Cubs	10–6	**Pfeffer** (5–3)	Kaufmann	—	4,000	88–62
151	September 27	Cubs	3–2 (10)	**Adams** (3–1)	Aldridge	—	4,000	89–62
152	September 28	@ Cubs	2–7	Jacobs	**Meadows** (13–12)	—	7,000	89–63
153	September 29	@ Cubs	5–4	**Yde** (16–3)	Blake	**Songer** (1)	1,500	90–63

Legend: = Win = Loss
Bold = Pirates team member

=== Roster ===
1924 Pittsburgh Pirates
**Roster**
**Pitchers**: Babe Adams; Wilbur Cooper; Ray Kremer; Del Lundgren; Buckshot May; Lee Meadows; Johnny Morrison; Jeff Pfeffer; Freddy Sale; Don Songer; Ray Steineder; Arnie Stone; Emil Yde	**Catchers**: Johnny Gooch; Cliff Knox; Walter Schmidt; Earl Smith; **Infielders**: Eppie Barnes; Jewel Ens; Charlie Grimm; Rabbit Maranville; Pie Traynor; Glenn Wright	**Outfielders**: Clyde Barnhart; Carson Bigbee; Max Carey; Kiki Cuyler; Eddie Moore; Walter Mueller; **Other batters**: Johnny Rawlings	**Manager**: Bill McKechnie

== Player stats ==
=== Batting ===
==== Starters by position ====
Note: Pos = Position; G = Games played; AB = At bats; H = Hits; Avg. = Batting average; HR = Home runs; RBI = Runs batted in

Pos	Player	G	AB	H	Avg.	HR	RBI
C	Johnny Gooch	70	224	65	.290	0	25
1B	Charlie Grimm	151	542	156	.288	2	63
2B	Rabbit Maranville	152	594	158	.266	2	71
SS	Glenn Wright	153	616	177	.287	7	111
3B	Pie Traynor	142	545	160	.294	5	82
OF	Max Carey	149	599	178	.297	8	55
OF	Kiki Cuyler	117	466	165	.354	9	85
OF	Clyde Barnhart	102	344	95	.276	3	51

==== Other batters ====
Note: G = Games played; AB = At bats; H = Hits; Avg. = Batting average; HR = Home runs; RBI = Runs batted in

Player	G	AB	H	Avg.	HR	RBI
Carson Bigbee	89	282	74	.262	0	15
Eddie Moore	72	209	75	.359	2	13
Walter Schmidt	58	177	43	.243	1	20
Earl Smith	39	111	41	.369	4	21
Walter Mueller	30	50	13	.260	0	8
Cliff Knox	6	18	4	.222	0	2
Jewel Ens	5	10	3	.300	0	0
Eppie Barnes	2	5	0	.000	0	0
Johnny Rawlings	3	3	1	.333	0	2

=== Pitching ===
==== Starting pitchers ====
Note: G = Games pitched; IP = Innings pitched; W = Wins; L = Losses; ERA = Earned run average; SO = Strikeouts

Player	G	IP	W	L	ERA	SO
Wilbur Cooper	38	268.2	20	14	3.28	62
Ray Kremer	41	259.1	18	10	3.19	64
Johnny Morrison	41	237.2	11	16	3.75	85
Lee Meadows	36	229.1	13	12	3.26	61
Emil Yde	33	194.0	16	3	2.83	53

==== Other pitchers ====
Note: G = Games pitched; IP = Innings pitched; W = Wins; L = Losses; ERA = Earned run average; SO = Strikeouts

Player	G	IP	W	L	ERA	SO
Jeff Pfeffer	15	58.2	5	3	3.07	19
Babe Adams	9	39.2	3	1	1.13	5
Don Songer	4	9.1	0	0	6.75	3

==== Relief pitchers ====
Note: G = Games pitched; W = Wins; L = Losses; SV = Saves; ERA = Earned run average; SO = Strikeouts

Player	G	W	L	SV	ERA	SO
Arnie Stone	26	4	2	0	2.95	7
Del Lundgren	8	0	1	0	6.48	4
Ray Steineder	5	0	1	0	13.50	0
Buckshot May	1	0	0	0	0.00	1
Freddy Sale	1	0	0	0	0.00	0

== Farm system ==
Level	Team	League	Manager
B	Williamsport Grays	New York–Pennsylvania League	Harry Hinchman

LEAGUE CHAMPIONS: Williamsport
