= 1924 Cincinnati Reds season =

1924 Cincinnati Reds
- League: National League
- Ballpark: Redland Field
- City: Cincinnati, Ohio
- Owners: Garry Herrmann
- Managers: Jack Hendricks
- Radio: WMH (Gene Mittendorf)

The 1924 Cincinnati Reds season was a season in American baseball. The team finished fourth in the National League with a record of 83–70, 10 games behind the New York Giants.

== Off-season ==
Following a second consecutive second-place finish in the National League during the 1923 season, the Reds had a quiet off-season, making only one notable transaction.

On December 11, 1923, the club purchased the contract of pitcher Carl Mays from the New York Yankees. Mays, the former ace of the Yankees, was coming off a poor season in 1923, earning a 5–2 record with a 6.20 ERA in 81.1 innings pitched, making only seven starts out of his 23 appearances. Mays had previously pitched for the Boston Red Sox from 1915 to 1919, helping them win the World Series twice, in 1915 and 1918. His best season in Boston was in 1917, where he posted a 22–7 record with a 1.74 ERA in 35 games. He played for the Yankees from 1919 to 1923, appearing in two World Series with the club in 1921 and 1922. Mays best season in New York was in 1921, as he led the American League with 27 wins and 336.2 innings pitched.

Manager Pat Moran became ill during the off-season, and was unable to resume being the Reds manager. Moran's medical condition worsened throughout the off-season, and he was unable to join the team in spring training. Moran eventually died from Bright's Disease on March 7, 1924. Replacing Moran as manager was Jack Hendricks, who had previously been the manager of the St. Louis Cardinals during the 1918 season, leading them to a record of 51–78 during his only season managing the club.

== Regular season ==
The Reds began the season with a very solid 15–7 record in their first 22 games, leading the National League by 1.5 games over the second place New York Giants. The Reds early success would not last though, as the team struggled to a 3–11 mark over the next couple of weeks, falling to a record of 18–18, and into third place, 3.5 games behind the first place Giants.

On May 30, the Reds traded outfielder George Harper to the Philadelphia Phillies for outfielder Curt Walker. Walker, who was five years younger than Harper at 27 years old, had a solid career with the Phillies, with his best season in 1922, as he batted .337 with 12 home runs and 89 RBI. To start the 1924 season with the Phillies, Walker batted .296 with a home run and 8 RBI in 24 games.

The club continued to struggle, and hit to a season low five games under .500 on June 26, following a 2–1 loss to the St. Louis Cardinals, dropping their record to 29–34 and in fifth place, 12.5 games behind the Giants. The team did rebound, and eventually climbed back over the .500 level, however, they continued to sit in fifth place. In the second game of a double header on July 8, Reds pitcher Eppa Rixey pitched a 16 inning complete game in a 2–1 win over the Philadelphia Phillies.

In September, the Reds would move into fourth place, and would finish the season with a record of 83–70, 10.5 games behind the pennant winning New York Giants. This marked the seventh time in the past eight seasons that the Reds finished with a winning record.

Outfielder Edd Roush led the way offensively, as he led the club with a .348 batting average, and led the National League with 21 triples. Roush finished in 10th place in National League MVP voting. Rookie second baseman Hughie Critz had a very solid season, batting .322 with three home runs and 35 RBI in 102 games. Outfielder Curt Walker batted .300 with four home runs and 46 RBI following his mid-season trade from the Philadelphia Phillies. Rube Bressler, who split time between the outfield and first base, batted .347 with four home runs and 45 RBI in 115 games.

Carl Mays emerged as the ace of the Reds pitching staff in 1924, as in his first season with the club, he earned a record of 20–9 with a 3.15 ERA in 226 innings pitched. Eppa Rixey posted a 16–15 record with a 2.76 ERA in 238.1 innings pitched, while Pete Donohue had another solid season, going 16–9 with a 3.60 ERA in 222.1 innings pitched. Dolf Luque struggled to a 10–15 record with a 3.16 ERA, however, he did lead the staff with 86 strikeouts.

=== Season standings ===
National League
Team	W	L	Pct.	GB	Home	Road
New York Giants	93	60	.608	—	51‍–‍26	42‍–‍34
Brooklyn Robins	92	62	.597	1½	46‍–‍31	46‍–‍31
Pittsburgh Pirates	90	63	.588	3	49‍–‍28	41‍–‍35
Cincinnati Reds	83	70	.542	10	43‍–‍33	40‍–‍37
Chicago Cubs	81	72	.529	12	46‍–‍31	35‍–‍41
St. Louis Cardinals	65	89	.422	28½	40‍–‍37	25‍–‍52
Philadelphia Phillies	55	96	.364	37	26‍–‍49	29‍–‍47
Boston Braves	53	100	.346	40	28‍–‍48	25‍–‍52

=== Record vs. opponents ===
1924 National League record Sources:
Team	BSN	BRO	CHC	CIN	NYG	PHI	PIT	STL
Boston	—	7–15	6–15	12–10	5–17	10–12–1	7–15	6–16
Brooklyn	15–7	—	12–10	12–10	8–14	17–5	13–9	15–7
Chicago	15–6	10–12	—	9–13	9–13–1	16–6	7–15	15–7
Cincinnati	10–12	10–12	13–9	—	9–13	16–5	12–10	13–9
New York	17–5	14–8	13–9–1	13–9	—	14–7	9–13	13–9
Philadelphia	12–10–1	5–17	6–16	5–16	7–14	—	8–13	12–10
Pittsburgh	15–7	9–13	15–7	10–12	13–9	13–8	—	15–7
St. Louis	16–6	7–15	7–15	9–13	9–13	10–12	7–15	—

=== Game log ===
Legend
	Reds win
	Reds loss
	Postponement
**Bold**	Reds team member

1924 Game Log

April (8–5)
#	Date	Opponent	TV	Score	Win	Loss	Save	Attendance	Record	Box
1	April 15	Pittsburgh		**W** 6–5				35,747		
2	April 16	Pittsburgh		**L** 0–1						
3	April 18	Pittsburgh		**W** 3–2						
4	April 19	Chicago		**L** 1–2						
5	April 20	Pittsburgh		**W** 3–2				13,000		
6	April 21	Pittsburgh		**W** 2–1				13,000		
7	April 22	Pittsburgh		**W** 2–1				1,900		
8	April 24	Pittsburgh		**W** 5–4				28,000		
9	April 25	Pittsburgh		**W** 5–4				28,000		
10	April 26	Pittsburgh		**L** 0–2				26,000		
11	April 27	St. Louis		**L** 4–6						
12	April 28	St. Louis		**W** 4–6						
13	April 29	St. Louis		**L** 3–6						

May (7–3)
#	Date	Opponent	TV	Score	Win	Loss	Save	Attendance	Record	Box
14	May 1	@ Chicago		**L** 1–8						
15	May 2	@ Chicago		**W** 4–3						
16	May 3	@ Chicago		**W** 7–3						
17	May 4	Pittsburgh		**W** 2–0						
18	May 4	Pittsburgh		**W** 5–4						
19	May 5	Chicago		**W** 3–2						
20	May 11	Philadelphia		**L** 0–2				4,000		
21	May 12	Philadelphia		**W** 4–1						
22	May 13	Philadelphia		**W** 4–3						
23	May 14	Braves		**L** 2–8						
24	May 15	Braves		**L** 0–4						
25	May 16	Braves		**L** 3–8						
26	May 17	Braves		**L** 0–4						
27	May 18	Brooklyn		**W** 5–4						
28	May 21	Brooklyn		**L** 2–9				5,000		
29	May 22	Giants		**L** 6–7				12,000		
30	May 23	Giants		**L** 3–8				8,000		
31	May 24	Giants		**W** 6–5				8,000		
32	May 25	Giants		**L** 1–6				8,000		
33	May 26	@ St. Louis		**L** 3–4						
34	May 27	@ St. Louis		**L** 3–4						
35	May 27	@ St. Louis		**L** 3–1						
36	May 28	@ St. Louis		**L** 0–6						
37	May 28	@ St. Louis		**W** 3–1						
38	May 30	@ Chicago		**W** 9–2						
39	May 30	@ Chicago		**W** 4–2						
40	May 31	@ Chicago		**L** 0–6						

June (13–16)
#	Date	Opponent	TV	Score	Win	Loss	Save	Attendance	Record	Box
41	June 1	St. Louis		**L** 2–6						
42	June 3	@ Braves		**W** 5–1						
43	June 5	@ Braves		**W** 6–0						
44	June 6	@ Braves		**L** 3–4						
45	June 7	@ Philadelphia		**W** 10–4						
46	June 9	@ Philadelphia		**L** 2–4						
47	June 10	@ Philadelphia		**W** 4–2						
48	June 11	@ Philadelphia		**L** 6–7						
49	June 13	@ Giants		**W** 4–1						
50	June 14	@ Giants		**L** 6–8						
51	June 15	@ Giants		**L** 1–4						
52	June 16	@ Giants		**L** 2–5						
53	June 17	@ Brooklyn		**L** 4–5						
54	June 18	@ Brooklyn		**W** 2–1						
55	June 19	@ Brooklyn		**L** 1–3						
56	June 20	@ Pirates		**L** 4–9						
57	June 21	@ Pirates		**L** 0–1						
58	June 22	Pirates		**W** 9–4						
59	June 23	Pirates		**L** 2–4						
60	June 24	Pirates		**L** 3–4						
61	June 25	St. Louis		**L** 2–3						
62	June 25	St. Louis		**W** 2–1						
63	June 25	St. Louis		**L** 1–2						
64	June 27	@ St. Louis		**W** 5–3						
65	June 27	@ St. Louis		**W** 5–2						
66	June 28	@ St. Louis		**W** 5–2						
66	June 28	@ St. Louis		**W** 8–7						
67	June 29	Chicago		**L** 2–6						
68	June 30	Chicago		**W** 2–1						

=== Roster ===
1924 Cincinnati Reds
**Roster**
**Pitchers**: Rube Benton; Pedro Dibut; Pete Donohue; Bill Harris; Dolf Luque; Jakie May; Carl Mays; Eppa Rixey; Tom Sheehan	**Catchers**: Jack Blott; Bubbles Hargrave; Gus Sandberg; Ivey Wingo; **Infielders**: Jim Begley; Sam Bohne; Rube Bressler; Ike Caveney; Hughie Critz; Jake Daubert; Lew Fonseca; Boob Fowler; Babe Pinelli	**Outfielders**: George Burns; Pat Duncan; George Harper; Ed Hock; Cliff Lee; Greasy Neale; Eddie Pick; Edd Roush; Chick Shorten; Curt Walker	**Manager**: Jack Hendricks

== Player stats ==
=== Batting ===
==== Starters by position ====
Note: Pos = Position; G = Games played; AB = At bats; H = Hits; Avg. = Batting average; HR = Home runs; RBI = Runs batted in

Pos	Player	G	AB	H	Avg.	HR	RBI
C	Bubbles Hargrave	98	312	94	.301	3	33
1B	Jake Daubert	102	405	114	.281	1	31
2B	Hughie Critz	102	413	133	.322	3	35
SS	Ike Caveney	45	337	92	.273	4	32
3B	Babe Pinelli	144	510	156	.306	0	70
OF	Curt Walker	109	397	119	.300	4	46
OF	Edd Roush	121	483	168	.348	3	72
OF	George Burns	93	336	86	.256	2	33

==== Other batters ====
Note: G = Games played; AB = At bats; H = Hits; Avg. = Batting average; HR = Home runs; RBI = Runs batted in

Player	G	AB	H	Avg.	HR	RBI
Rube Bressler	115	383	133	.347	4	49
Sam Bohne	100	349	89	.255	4	46
Pat Duncan	96	319	86	.270	2	37
Ivey Wingo	66	192	55	.286	1	23
Boob Fowler	59	129	43	.333	0	9
George Harper	28	74	20	.270	0	3
Chick Shorten	41	69	19	.275	0	6
Lew Fonseca	20	57	13	.228	0	9
Gus Sandberg	24	52	9	.173	0	3
Ed Hock	16	10	1	.100	0	0
Cliff Lee	6	6	2	.333	0	2
Jim Begley	2	5	1	.200	0	0
Greasy Neale	3	4	0	.000	0	0
Eddie Pick	3	2	0	.000	0	0
Jack Blott	2	1	0	.000	0	0

=== Pitching ===
==== Starting pitchers ====
Note: G = Games pitched; IP = Innings pitched; W = Wins; L = Losses; ERA = Earned run average; SO = Strikeouts

Player	G	IP	W	L	ERA	SO
Eppa Rixey	35	238.1	15	14	2.76	57
Carl Mays	37	226.0	20	9	3.15	63
Pete Donohue	35	222.1	16	9	3.60	72
Dolf Luque	31	219.1	10	15	3.16	86

==== Other pitchers ====
Note: G = Games pitched; IP = Innings pitched; W = Wins; L = Losses; ERA = Earned run average; SO = Strikeouts

Player	G	IP	W	L	ERA	SO
Tom Sheehan	39	166.2	9	11	3.24	52
Rube Benton	32	162.2	7	9	2.77	42
Pedro Dibut	7	36.2	3	0	2.21	15

==== Relief pitchers ====
Note: G = Games pitched; W = Wins; L = Losses; SV = Saves; ERA = Earned run average; SO = Strikeouts

Player	G	W	L	SV	ERA	SO
Jakie May	38	3	3	6	3.00	59
Bill Harris	3	0	0	0	9.00	5
