= 1924 Chicago Cubs season =

1924 Chicago Cubs
- League: National League
- Ballpark: Cubs Park
- City: Chicago
- Record: 81–72 (.529)
- League place: 5th
- Owners: William Wrigley Jr.
- Managers: Bill Killefer
- Radio: WMAQ (Hal Totten)

The 1924 Chicago Cubs season was the 53rd season of the Chicago Cubs franchise, the 49th in the National League and the ninth at Wrigley Field (then known as "Cubs Park"). The Cubs finished fifth in the National League with a record of 81–72.

== Regular season ==
=== Season standings ===
National League
Team	W	L	Pct.	GB	Home	Road
New York Giants	93	60	.608	—	51‍–‍26	42‍–‍34
Brooklyn Robins	92	62	.597	1½	46‍–‍31	46‍–‍31
Pittsburgh Pirates	90	63	.588	3	49‍–‍28	41‍–‍35
Cincinnati Reds	83	70	.542	10	43‍–‍33	40‍–‍37
Chicago Cubs	81	72	.529	12	46‍–‍31	35‍–‍41
St. Louis Cardinals	65	89	.422	28½	40‍–‍37	25‍–‍52
Philadelphia Phillies	55	96	.364	37	26‍–‍49	29‍–‍47
Boston Braves	53	100	.346	40	28‍–‍48	25‍–‍52

=== Record vs. opponents ===
1924 National League record Sources:
Team	BSN	BRO	CHC	CIN	NYG	PHI	PIT	STL
Boston	—	7–15	6–15	12–10	5–17	10–12–1	7–15	6–16
Brooklyn	15–7	—	12–10	12–10	8–14	17–5	13–9	15–7
Chicago	15–6	10–12	—	9–13	9–13–1	16–6	7–15	15–7
Cincinnati	10–12	10–12	13–9	—	9–13	16–5	12–10	13–9
New York	17–5	14–8	13–9–1	13–9	—	14–7	9–13	13–9
Philadelphia	12–10–1	5–17	6–16	5–16	7–14	—	8–13	12–10
Pittsburgh	15–7	9–13	15–7	10–12	13–9	13–8	—	15–7
St. Louis	16–6	7–15	7–15	9–13	9–13	10–12	7–15	—

=== Roster ===
1924 Chicago Cubs
Roster
Pitchers: Vic Aldridge; Pete Alexander; Sheriff Blake; Herb Brett; Guy Bush; Elmer Jacobs; Tony Kaufmann; Vic Keen; George Milstead; Tiny Osborne; Ray Pierce; Rip Wheeler	Catchers: John Churry; Gabby Hartnett; Bob O'Farrell; Infielders: Sparky Adams; Bob Barrett; Hooks Cotter; Allen Elliott; Bernie Friberg; George Grantham; Ray Grimes; Charlie Hollocher; Teddy Kearns; Ralph Michaels	Outfielders: Howie Fitzgerald; Denver Grigsby; Cliff Heathcote; Hack Miller; Jigger Statz; Otto Vogel; Butch Weis	Manager: Bill Killefer; Coaches: Oscar Dugey

== Player stats ==
=== Batting ===
==== Starters by position ====
Note: Pos = Position; G = Games played; AB = At bats; H = Hits; Avg. = Batting average; HR = Home runs; RBI = Runs batted in

Pos	Player	G	AB	H	Avg.	HR	RBI
C	Gabby Hartnett	111	354	106	.299	16	67
1B	Hooks Cotter	98	310	81	.261	4	33
2B	George Grantham	127	469	148	.316	12	60
SS	Sparky Adams	117	418	117	.280	1	27
3B	Bernie Friberg	142	495	138	.279	5	82
OF	Cliff Heathcote	113	392	121	.309	0	30
OF	Jigger Statz	135	549	152	.277	3	49
OF	Denver Grigsby	124	411	123	.299	3	48

==== Other batters ====
Note: G = Games played; AB = At bats; H = Hits; Avg. = Batting average; HR = Home runs; RBI = Runs batted in

Player	G	AB	H	Avg.	HR	RBI
Charlie Hollocher	76	286	70	.245	2	21
Bob O'Farrell	71	183	44	.240	3	28
Ray Grimes	51	177	53	.299	5	34
Otto Vogel	70	172	46	.267	1	24
Butch Weis	37	133	37	.278	0	23
Bob Barrett	54	133	32	.241	5	21
Hack Miller	53	131	44	.336	4	25
Howie Fitzgerald	7	19	3	.158	0	2
Teddy Kearns	4	16	4	.250	0	1
Allen Elliott	10	14	2	.143	0	0
Ralph Michaels	8	11	4	.364	0	2
John Churry	6	7	1	.143	0	0

=== Pitching ===
==== Starting pitchers ====
Note: G = Games pitched; IP = Innings pitched; W = Wins; L = Losses; ERA = Earned run average; SO = Strikeouts

Player	G	IP	W	L	ERA	SO
Vic Aldridge	32	244.1	15	12	3.50	74
Vic Keen	40	234.2	15	14	3.80	75
Tony Kaufmann	34	208.1	16	11	4.02	79
Pete Alexander	21	169.1	12	5	3.03	33
Duke Brett	1	5.1	0	0	5.06	1

==== Other pitchers ====
Note: G = Games pitched; IP = Innings pitched; W = Wins; L = Losses; ERA = Earned run average; SO = Strikeouts

Player	G	IP	W	L	ERA	SO
Elmer Jacobs	38	190.1	11	12	3.74	50
Sheriff Blake	29	106.1	6	6	4.57	42
Guy Bush	16	80.2	2	5	4.02	36

==== Relief pitchers ====
Note: G = Games pitched; W = Wins; L = Losses; SV = Saves; ERA = Earned run average; SO = Strikeouts

Player	G	W	L	SV	ERA	SO
Rip Wheeler	29	3	6	0	3.91	16
George Milstead	13	1	1	0	6.07	6
Ray Pierce	6	0	0	0	7.36	2
Tiny Osborne	2	0	0	1	3.00	2

== Farm system ==
Level	Team	League	Manager
AA	Los Angeles Angels	Pacific Coast League	Marty Krug
