= Gus Sandberg =

American baseball player (1895–1930)

- Catcher
- Born: February 23, 1895; Long Island City, New York
- Died: February 3, 1930 (aged 34); Los Angeles, California
- Batted: Right Threw: Right

MLB debut
- May 11, 1923, for the Cincinnati Reds

Last MLB appearance
- August 8, 1924, for the Cincinnati Reds

MLB statistics
- Batting average: .174
- Home runs: 0
- Runs batted in: 4
- Stats at Baseball Reference

Teams
- Cincinnati Reds (1923–1924)

Gustave E. Sandberg (February 23, 1895 – February 3, 1930), whose last name was sometimes spelled Sanberg, was a catcher in Major League Baseball. He played for the Cincinnati Reds in the 1923 and 1924 seasons. While playing in the minor leagues, Sandberg died of injuries sustained in an accidental fire.

== Early life ==
Sandberg, from New York City, played semipro baseball as a young man. With the Empire City A.A. team from Ridgewood, Queens, Sandberg was teammates with future major league players including Jimmy Ring and Hugh McQuillan.

== Career ==
In July 1915, Sandberg signed a contract to play with the New York Giants organization, and in early 1916 the team sent him to play with the Albany Senators of the New York State League. In 1919, Sandberg joined the Toronto Maple Leafs of the International League. The next year, newspapers reported that several major league managers - most recently George Stallings of the Boston Braves - were interested in signing him.

In 1923, Sandberg was with the Cincinnati Reds from May through October, but he only played in seven regular-season games. He appeared in 24 games with the Reds the next season, getting 9 hits in 52 at bats. He played his last major league game on August 8, 1924. Returning to the minor leagues after the 1924 season, Sandberg was the catcher for the Los Angeles Angels of the Pacific Coast League between 1925 and 1929. He hit .289 with 7 home runs in 131 games in his last season with Los Angeles.

== Death ==
While playing for the Los Angeles Angels in the Pacific Coast League, Sandberg had been visited at his home by his former manager and friend, Marty Krug, on February 2, 1930. Krug was out of gasoline when he reached Sandberg's home, so Sandberg siphoned some fuel out of his own vehicle. The men feared that Sandberg would be left without enough fuel to reach a gas station, so Sandberg lit a match to see how much fuel he had left in his fuel tank. The gas tank exploded, igniting Sandberg's clothing. Krug tried to help his catcher, and he sustained minor burns himself, but Sandberg suffered severe burns. He died in a local hospital the next day.
