= John Churry =

American baseball player (1900–1970)

- Catcher
- Born: November 26, 1900; Johnstown, Pennsylvania, U.S.
- Died: February 8, 1970 (aged 69); Zanesville, Ohio, U.S.
- Batted: Right Threw: Right

MLB debut
- May 24, 1924, for the Chicago Cubs

Last MLB appearance
- June 21, 1927, for the Chicago Cubs

MLB statistics
- Batting average: .278
- Games played: 12
- Hits: 5
- Stats at Baseball Reference

Teams
- Chicago Cubs (1924–1927)

John Churry (November 26, 1900 – February 8, 1970) was an American professional baseball player and catcher in the Major Leagues for the Chicago Cubs from 1924 to 1927. Born in Johnstown, Pennsylvania, he threw and batted right-handed and was listed as 5 feet 9 inches (1.75 m) tall and 172 pounds (78 kg).

Churry appeared in 12 games in his four MLB seasons. He batted a total of 21 times and collected five career hits, with one double, and one run batted in. He also took three bases on balls and posted a batting average of .278. He started three games at catcher and played errorless ball in a total of 37 innings in the field. He retired in 1927 and died in Zanesville, Ohio, at the age of 69.
