= Jim Begley =

American baseball player (1902–1957)

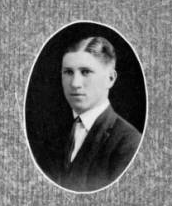
- Second baseman
- Born: September 19, 1902; San Francisco, California
- Died: February 22, 1957 (aged 54); San Francisco, California
- Batted: Right Threw: Right

MLB debut
- May 28, 1924, for the Cincinnati Reds

Last MLB appearance
- May 28, 1924, for the Cincinnati Reds

MLB statistics
- Games: 1
- At bats: 5
- Hits: 1

Teams
- Cincinnati Reds (1924)

James Lawrence Begley (September 19, 1902 – February 22, 1957), nicknamed "Imp", was a Major League Baseball player. Begley played for the Cincinnati Reds in the 1924 season. In two games, he had one hit in five at-bats, with two walks. Begley batted and threw right-handed.

He was born and died in San Francisco, California.

Begley attended the University of San Francisco, California.
