= Pedro Dibut =

Cuban baseball player (1892–1979)

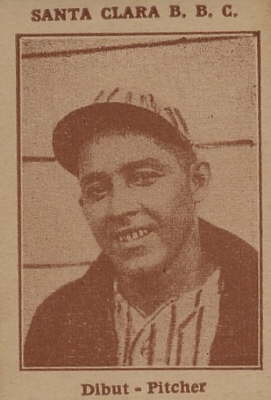
- Pitcher
- Born: November 18, 1892; Cienfuegos, Cuba
- Died: December 4, 1979 (aged 87); Hialeah, Florida, U.S.
- Batted: Right Threw: Right

Professional debut
- NgL: 1923, for the Cuban Stars West
- MLB: May 1, 1924, for the Cincinnati Reds

Last MLB appearance
- April 22, 1925, for the Cincinnati Reds

MLB (Note: On December 16, 2020, Major League Baseball declared the Negro leagues, from the span of 1920–1948, to be a "Major League". Dibut's statistics reflect his time in the Negro leagues during the 1923 season.) statistics
- Win–loss record: 10–8
- Earned run average: 3.71
- Strikeouts: 46
- Stats at Baseball Reference

Teams
- Cuban Stars West (1923); Cincinnati Reds (1924–1925)

Pedro Dibut Villafana (November 18, 1892 – December 4, 1979) was a Cuban professional baseball pitcher who played in Major League Baseball (MLB) for the Cincinnati Reds in 1924 and 1925. In 1923, Dibut played for the Cuban Stars (West) in the Negro National League, one of several white Cubans who played in both Negro league baseball and in the then-segregated major leagues.

Dibut was a small man who threw a fastball, a curveball, and "about four different changes of pace."

== Playing career ==
=== Early career ===
In the fall of 1916, Dibut was signed by the Milwaukee Brewers of the minor league American Association. He had been playing in the Cuban Amateur League, where he was the leading pitcher and had gone 10–3, with 118 strikeouts in 123 innings. Later that winter, Dibut joined the Red Sox team in the professional Cuban League under manager Mike González. The 1916/17 season ran from January 29 through February 26, with each team playing 14 games. Dibut pitched in four games with a 1–0 win–loss record.

In the spring of 1917, Dibut reported to spring training with Milwaukee. According to Sporting Life, he "showed well at the start of the season", but "was started back to his home at Cienfuegos, Cuba" in early April. In addition to pitching, he had been tried as an outfielder, but did not have enough experience in that position. The next winter he pitched in the Cuban League for Habana, again under the management of González, and appeared in three games, again going 1–0. With strong performances from Dibut's teammates, José Acosta, Jacinto Calvo, and Merito Acosta, Habana won the championship that season.

Dibut then returned to the Cuban Amateur League. In 1920 he was the star pitcher for the Cienfuegos Federales that won the Amateur League championship with a record of 19–4.

In 1923, Dibut turned professional again and joined the Cuban Stars (West), a team of Cuban players that competed in the Negro National League. In 18 games and 109 innings pitched, he went 7–8 with a 4.05 earned run average.

That winter, Dibut returned to the Cuban League and signed with the Leopardos de Santa Clara. The team, which featured Negro league and Cuban stars Oscar Charleston, Alejandro Oms, Dobie Moore, and Oliver Marcelle, along with a pitching staff of Bill Holland, Dave Brown, Rube Currie, Merven Ryan, and José Méndez, in addition to Dibut, dominated the league with a 36–11 record and finished 11 1/2 games ahead of second place Habana. According to Figueredo, the 1923/24 Leopardos are "considered as the most dominant team ever in the history of Cuban baseball." Dibut appeared in nine games with a 3–3 record.

=== Cincinnati Reds ===
That winter, the Cincinnati Reds signed Dibut as a free agent. Dibut made his major league debut on May 1 against the Chicago Cubs, entering in the seventh with the Reds behind 8–1. He pitched the last two innings without giving up a run, allowing only one hit.

After one appearance, Dibut was assigned to the Bridgeport Bears of the Eastern League. In late June, he was reassigned to the St. Petersburg Saints of the Florida State League. He went 8–2 with the Saints and allowed only 13 runs in 75 innings pitched.

In August, Dibut was recalled by the Cincinnati Reds and on August 17 he appeared in his second major league game. He entered in the top of the fifth inning against Brooklyn with the Reds behind 8–3, and pitched five shutout innings without giving up a hit. The final score was 8–5. He made his first major league start a week later against Boston and pitched a complete game, holding the Braves to two runs on four hits in an 8–2 victory for the Reds.

Dibut finished the 1924 season with a 3–0 record in seven major league games—two complete game starts and five relief appearances. His earned run average was 2.21 in 36 2/3 innings pitched. At the end of the season, he was offered a contract for the following year which stipulated that he was not allowed to play winter ball in Cuba.

In the spring of 1925, Dibut reported late to spring training because of difficulties in obtaining a passport. It was reported that the problems were due to a felony conviction several years earlier in Cuba. Dibut developed a sore arm in spring training in Orlando, but remained on the Reds' roster when the season started. His only appearance in 1925 occurred on April 22 against the St. Louis Cardinals. He came into the game in the bottom of the first with two outs, two runners on base, and the Reds already behind 7–2. He proceeded to give up consecutive hits to Rogers Hornsby, Jim Bottomley, and Les Bell, allowing four more runs to score. Harry Biemiller was called in to relieve Dibut before he'd recorded any outs. On May 6, manager Jack Hendricks announced that the Reds had unconditionally released Dibut.

=== Later career ===
In the spring of 1926, Dibut returned to the St. Petersburg Saints, saying that he hoped to return to Cincinnati. In the early weeks of the season, Dibut pitched and also played right field. He was released by the Saints and played for two teams in the amateur city league. In mid-summer he signed with the Raleigh Capitals in the Piedmont League, where he went 8–12 with a 2.93 ERA.

In the winter of 1926/27 Dibut returned to pitch in the Cuban League, pitching for Habana. He went 5–3; his five wins tied for the league lead. His Habana team won the league pennant. In 1927/28 he finished his Cuban League career, pitching two games for Habana without recording a decision.

In the summers of 1928 and 1929, Dibut pitched for the Jacksonville Tars of the Southeastern League. During the 1929 spring training, the Tars played and beat the world champion New York Yankees. Dibut entered the game in the top of the fifth with the Tars trailing 10– 4. He allowed two runs in the fifth, then held the Yankees scoreless in the last four innings. Meanwhile, the Tars scored 9 runs and won the game 13–12, with Dibut the winning pitcher. In 1928, Dibut went 9–7 with a 3.63 ERA for Jacksonville, and in 1929 he went 4–4 with a 4.28 ERA, pitching for both the Jacksonville Tars and the Pensacola Flyers.
