= Lerton Pinto =

American baseball player (1899-1983)

- Pitcher
- Born: April 8, 1899; Chillicothe, Ohio, U.S.
- Died: May 13, 1983 (aged 84); Oxnard, California, U.S.
- Batted: Left Threw: Left

MLB debut
- May 23, 1922, for the Philadelphia Phillies

Last MLB appearance
- September 5, 1924, for the Philadelphia Phillies

MLB statistics
- Win–loss record: 0–1
- Earned run average: 5.65
- Strikeouts: 5
- Stats at Baseball Reference

Teams
- Philadelphia Phillies (1922, 1924)

William Lerton Pinto (April 8, 1899 – May 13, 1983) was an American pitcher in Major League Baseball. He played for the Philadelphia Phillies.
