= Art Delaney =

American baseball player (1897–1970)

- Pitcher
- Born: January 5, 1897; Chicago, Illinois, U.S.
- Died: May 2, 1970 (aged 73); Hayward, California, U.S.
- Batted: Right Threw: Right

MLB debut
- April 16, 1924, for the St. Louis Cardinals

Last MLB appearance
- September 27, 1929, for the Boston Braves

MLB statistics
- Win–loss record: 13–22
- Earned run average: 4.26
- Strikeouts: 64
- Stats at Baseball Reference

Teams
- St. Louis Cardinals (1924); Boston Braves (1928–1929)

Arthur Dewey Delaney (January 5, 1897 – May 2, 1970) was an American professional baseball pitcher. He played in Major League Baseball (MLB) from 1924 to 1929 for the St. Louis Cardinals and Boston Braves.
