= Frank Parkinson (baseball) =

American baseball player (1895–1960)

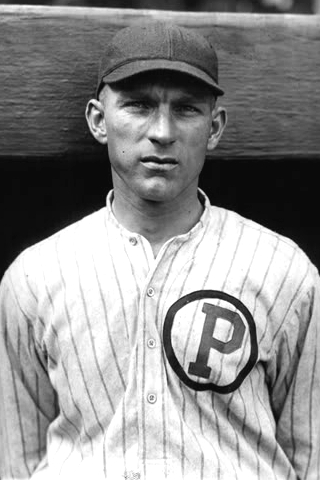
- Second baseman
- Born: March 23, 1895; Dickson City, Pennsylvania, U.S.
- Died: July 4, 1960 (aged 65); Trenton, New Jersey, U.S.
- Batted: Right Threw: Right

MLB debut
- April 13, 1921, for the Philadelphia Phillies

Last MLB appearance
- September 27, 1924, for the Philadelphia Phillies

MLB statistics
- Batting average: .256
- Home runs: 24
- Runs batted in: 149
- Stats at Baseball Reference

Teams
- Philadelphia Phillies (1921–1924)

Frank Joseph "Parky" Parkinson (March 23, 1895 – July 4, 1960) was an American professional baseball player.

== Early life ==
One of seven sons and two daughters born to Polish immigrants, Frank "Parky" Parkinson was born in Dickson City, Pennsylvania, on March 23, 1895. His parents were Michael Parczynski and Mary Anna Blendowka from West Prussia, Prussia. When he was a year old the family moved to Trenton, New Jersey. The family can be found in the 1900 census for Trenton, NJ, living on Asbury Street.

By the age of 15 he had quit school and was working as a laborer in a car shop. In 1917 when the United States entered World War I, Parkinson enlisted in the Army. He served 2 years with the 35th Engineers, Company I before he was honorably discharged.

== Professional career ==
Parkinson played for the Philadelphia Phillies between 1921 and 1924. His first game was April 13, 1921 at the Baker Bowl in Philadelphia against the New York Giants. He was a 26-year-old rookie, like most men of his generation his career was put on hold while fighting in Europe during World War I Parkinson was right-handed and primarily played second base, although he was occasionally used as a third baseman and a shortstop. In 378 lifetime games, he had 335 hits and batted .256; his 93 strikeouts in 1922 led the National League. His total of 562 assists in 1922 at second base is among the highest all-time for a single season.

After his stint with the Phillies, Parkinson played several years in minor leagues, signing with the Nashville Vols in 1925 and the Pittsfield Hillies in 1927-28.

Parkinson's obituary from The Trenton Evening Times stated that "Parkinson's best day with the Phillies was Labor Day 1922 when he hit two home runs and two doubles to beat the Brooklyn Dodgers 7 to 6. He set was then a fielding record with 12 putouts and assists without an error"

A knee injury effectively ended Parkinson's career 1929.

== Personal life ==
Parkinson married Margaret Ferry on October 18, 1924 in Trenton, New Jersey. They had no children and remained married until his death in 1960. Prior to his death he worked for the Trenton Board of Education and remained active in local Minor League Baseball administration.
