= Fritz Henrich =

American baseball player (1889-1959)

- Outfielder
- Born: May 8, 1899; Cincinnati, Ohio
- Died: May 1, 1959 (aged 59); Philadelphia, Pennsylvania
- Batted: Left Threw: Left

MLB debut
- April 19, 1924, for the Philadelphia Phillies

Last MLB appearance
- September 13, 1924, for the Philadelphia Phillies

MLB statistics
- Batting average: .211
- Home runs: 0
- Runs batted in: 4
- Stats at Baseball Reference

Teams
- Philadelphia Phillies (1924)

Frank Wilde "Fritz" Henrich (May 8, 1899 – May 1, 1959) was an outfielder in Major League Baseball. He played for the Philadelphia Phillies in 1924.
