= Arnie Stone =

American baseball pitcher (1892–1948)

- Pitcher
- Born: October 9, 1892; North Creek, New York
- Died: July 29, 1948 (aged 55); Hudson Falls, New York
- Batted: Right Threw: Left

MLB debut
- July 30, 1923, for the Pittsburgh Pirates

Last MLB appearance
- September 16, 1924, for the Pittsburgh Pirates

MLB statistics
- Win–loss record: 4-3
- Earned run average: 3.77
- Strikeouts: 9
- Stats at Baseball Reference

Teams
- Pittsburgh Pirates (1923–1924)

Edwin Arnold Stone (October 9, 1892 – July 29, 1948) was a pitcher in Major League Baseball. He played for the Pittsburgh Pirates.
