= Jesse Fowler =

American baseball player (1898–1973)

- Pitcher
- Born: October 30, 1898; Spartanburg, South Carolina, U.S.
- Died: September 23, 1973 (aged 74); Columbia, South Carolina, U.S.
- Batted: Right Threw: Left

MLB debut
- July 29, 1924, for the St. Louis Cardinals

Last MLB appearance
- September 27, 1924, for the St. Louis Cardinals

MLB statistics
- Win–loss record: 1–1
- Earned run average: 4.41
- Strikeouts: 5
- Stats at Baseball Reference

Teams
- St. Louis Cardinals (1924)

Jesse Peter Fowler (October 30, 1898 – September 23, 1973), nicknamed "Pete", was an American Major League Baseball pitcher who played for the St. Louis Cardinals in 1924. The left-hander was a native of Spartanburg, South Carolina.

Fowler made his major league debut in relief on July 29, 1924, against the New York Giants at the Polo Grounds. His first and only big league win, also in relief, was against the Philadelphia Phillies at Sportsman's Park. The score was 13–10 in game 2 of a doubleheader played August 20, 1924.

Season and career totals include a record of 1–1 in 13 games pitched, 3 games started, 0 complete games, and 6 games finished. In 32.2 innings pitched he struck out 5, walked 18, allowed 28 hits, and had an earned run average of 4.41.

Fowler died at the age of 74 in Columbia, South Carolina.

Despite an age difference of more than 23 years, Jesse was the older brother of former major league pitcher and pitching coach Art Fowler, and the Fowlers hold the record for the largest age difference between brothers who played Major League baseball.
