= Vince Shields =

Canadian baseball player (1900–1952)

- Pitcher
- Born: November 18, 1900; Fredericton, New Brunswick, Canada
- Died: October 16, 1952 (aged 51); Plaster Rock, New Brunswick, Canada
- Batted: Left Threw: Right

MLB debut
- September 20, 1924, for the St. Louis Cardinals

Last MLB appearance
- September 25, 1924, for the St. Louis Cardinals

MLB statistics
- Win–loss record: 1-1
- Earned run average: 3.00
- Strikeouts: 4
- Stats at Baseball Reference

Teams
- St. Louis Cardinals (1924)

Vincent William Shields (November 18, 1900 – October 16, 1952) was a pitcher in Major League Baseball. He played for the St. Louis Cardinals in 1924.
