= Allen Elliott =

American baseball player (1897–1979)

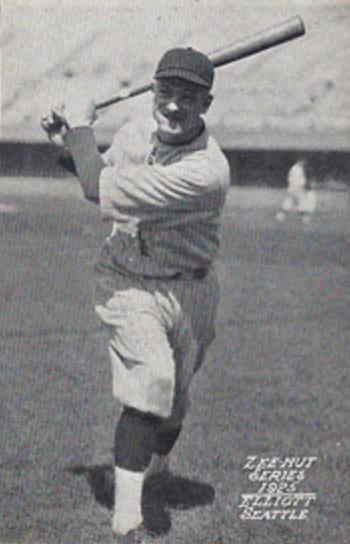
- First baseman
- Born: December 25, 1897; St. Louis, Missouri
- Died: May 6, 1979 (aged 81); St. Louis, Missouri
- Batted: Left Threw: Right

MLB debut
- June 14, 1923, for the Chicago Cubs

Last MLB appearance
- September 29, 1924, for the Chicago Cubs

MLB statistics
- Batting average: .242
- Home runs: 2
- Runs batted in: 29
- Stats at Baseball Reference

Teams
- Chicago Cubs (1923–1924)

Allen Clifford Elliott (December 25, 1897 – May 6, 1979) was a first baseman in Major League Baseball. Nicknamed "Ace", he played for the Chicago Cubs.
