= Bob Vines =

American baseball player (1897–1982)

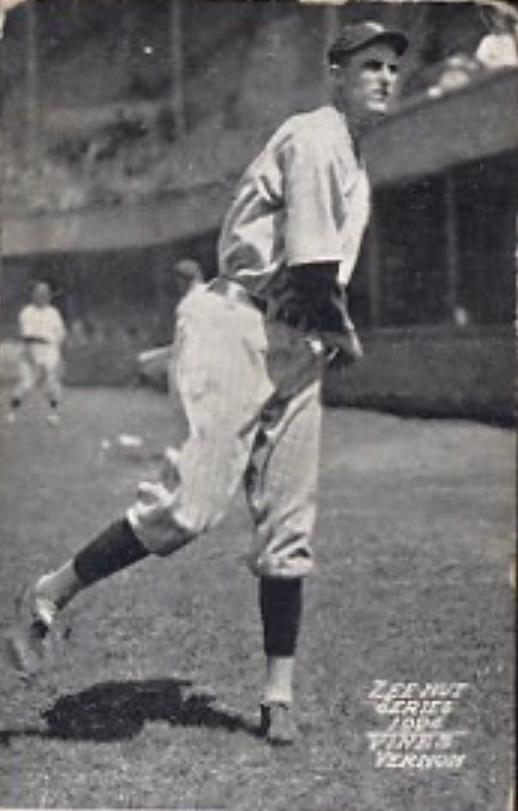
- Pitcher
- Born: February 25, 1897; Waxahachie, Texas, U.S.
- Died: October 18, 1982 (aged 85); Orlando, Florida, U.S.
- Batted: Right Threw: Right

MLB debut
- September 3, 1924, for the St. Louis Cardinals

Last MLB appearance
- June 2, 1925, for the Philadelphia Phillies

MLB statistics
- Games: 5
- Innings pitched: 14.2
- ERA: 9.82
- Stats at Baseball Reference

Teams
- St. Louis Cardinals (1924); Philadelphia Phillies (1925)

Robert Earl Vines (February 25, 1897 – October 18, 1982) was an American professional baseball pitcher. Vines played for the St. Louis Cardinals in 1924 and the Philadelphia Phillies in 1925. In 5 career games, he had a 0–0 record with a 9.82 ERA. He batted and threw right-handed.

Vines was born in Waxahachie, Texas and died in Orlando, Florida.
