= Don Songer =

American baseball player (1899–1962)

- Pitcher
- Born: January 31, 1899; Walnut, Kansas, U.S.
- Died: October 3, 1962 (aged 63); Kansas City, Missouri, U.S.
- Batted: Left Threw: Left

MLB debut
- September 21, 1924, for the Pittsburgh Pirates

Last MLB appearance
- August 5, 1927, for the New York Giants

MLB statistics
- Win–loss record: 10–14
- Earned run average: 3.38
- Strikeouts: 44
- Stats at Baseball Reference

Teams
- Pittsburgh Pirates (1924–1927); New York Giants (1927)

Donald C. Songer (January 31, 1899 – October 3, 1962) was an American Major League Baseball pitcher. He played four seasons in the major leagues, from 1924 until 1927, for the Pittsburgh Pirates and New York Giants.

== Sources ==
- Career statistics from Baseball Reference · Baseball Reference (Minors) · Retrosheet · Baseball Almanac
