= Rip Wheeler =

American baseball player (1898–1968)

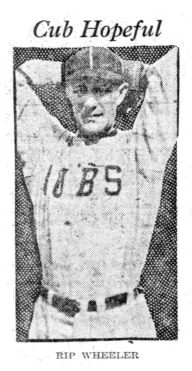
- Pitcher
- Born: March 2, 1898; Marion, Kentucky, U.S.
- Died: September 18, 1968 (aged 70); Marion, Kentucky, U.S.
- Batted: Right Threw: Right

MLB debut
- September 30, 1921, for the Pittsburgh Pirates

Last MLB appearance
- September 29, 1924, for the Chicago Cubs

MLB statistics
- Win–loss record: 4–8
- Earned run average: 4.18
- Strikeouts: 21
- Stats at Baseball Reference

Teams
- Pittsburgh Pirates (1921–1922); Chicago Cubs (1923–1924)

Floyd Clark "Rip" Wheeler (March 2, 1898 – September 18, 1968) was an American Major League Baseball (MLB) pitcher from 1921 to 1924 for the Pittsburgh Pirates and Chicago Cubs.
