= Del Lundgren =

American baseball player (1899–1984)

- Pitcher
- Born: September 21, 1899; Lindsborg, Kansas, U.S.
- Died: September 19, 1984 (aged 84); Lindsborg, Kansas, U.S.
- Batted: Right Threw: Right

MLB debut
- April 27, 1924, for the Pittsburgh Pirates

Last MLB appearance
- October 1, 1927, for the Boston Red Sox

MLB statistics
- Win–loss record: 5–15
- Earned run average: 6.51
- Strikeouts: 54
- Stats at Baseball Reference

Teams
- Pittsburgh Pirates (1924); Boston Red Sox (1926–1927)

Ebin Delmer Lundgren (September 21, 1899 – October 19, 1984) was an American pitcher in Major League Baseball who played from 1924 through 1927 for the Pittsburgh Pirates (1924) and Boston Red Sox (1926–27). Listed at 5 ft 8 in (1.73 m), 160 lb, Lundgren batted and threw right-handed. He was born in Lindsborg, Kansas.

In a three-season career, Lundgren posted a 5–15 record 54 strikeouts and a 6.51 ERA in 56 appearances, including 19 starts, five complete games, two shutouts, and 184.0 innings of work.

Lundgren died in his hometown of Lindsborg at age 84.
