= Buckshot May =

American baseball player (William Herbert May; 1899–1984)

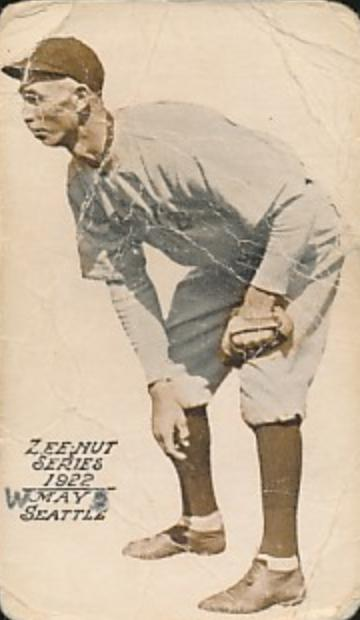
- Pitcher
- Born: December 13, 1899; Bakersfield, California, U.S.
- Died: March 15, 1984 (aged 84); Bakersfield, California, U.S.
- Batted: Right Threw: Right

MLB debut
- May 9, 1924, for the Pittsburgh Pirates

Last MLB appearance
- May 9, 1924, for the Pittsburgh Pirates

MLB statistics
- Win–loss record: 0–0
- Earned run average: 0.00
- Strikeouts: 1
- Stats at Baseball Reference

Teams
- Pittsburgh Pirates (1924)

William Herbert "Buckshot" May (December 13, 1899 – March 15, 1984) was an American Major League Baseball pitcher who appeared in one game for the Pittsburgh Pirates in 1924. The 24-year-old right-hander stood 6'2" and weighed 169 lbs.

On May 9, 1924, May came in to pitch the top of the 9th inning in a home game against the Boston Braves at Forbes Field. He pitched a scoreless inning, with one strikeout, but the Pirates lost 10–7. His lifetime ERA stands at 0.00.

His manager was future Hall of Famer Bill McKechnie. Other notable teammates who would one day be members of the Baseball Hall of Fame were Max Carey, Kiki Cuyler, Rabbit Maranville, and Pie Traynor.

May died in his hometown of Bakersfield, California at the age of 84.
