= Curt Walker =

American baseball player (1896–1955)

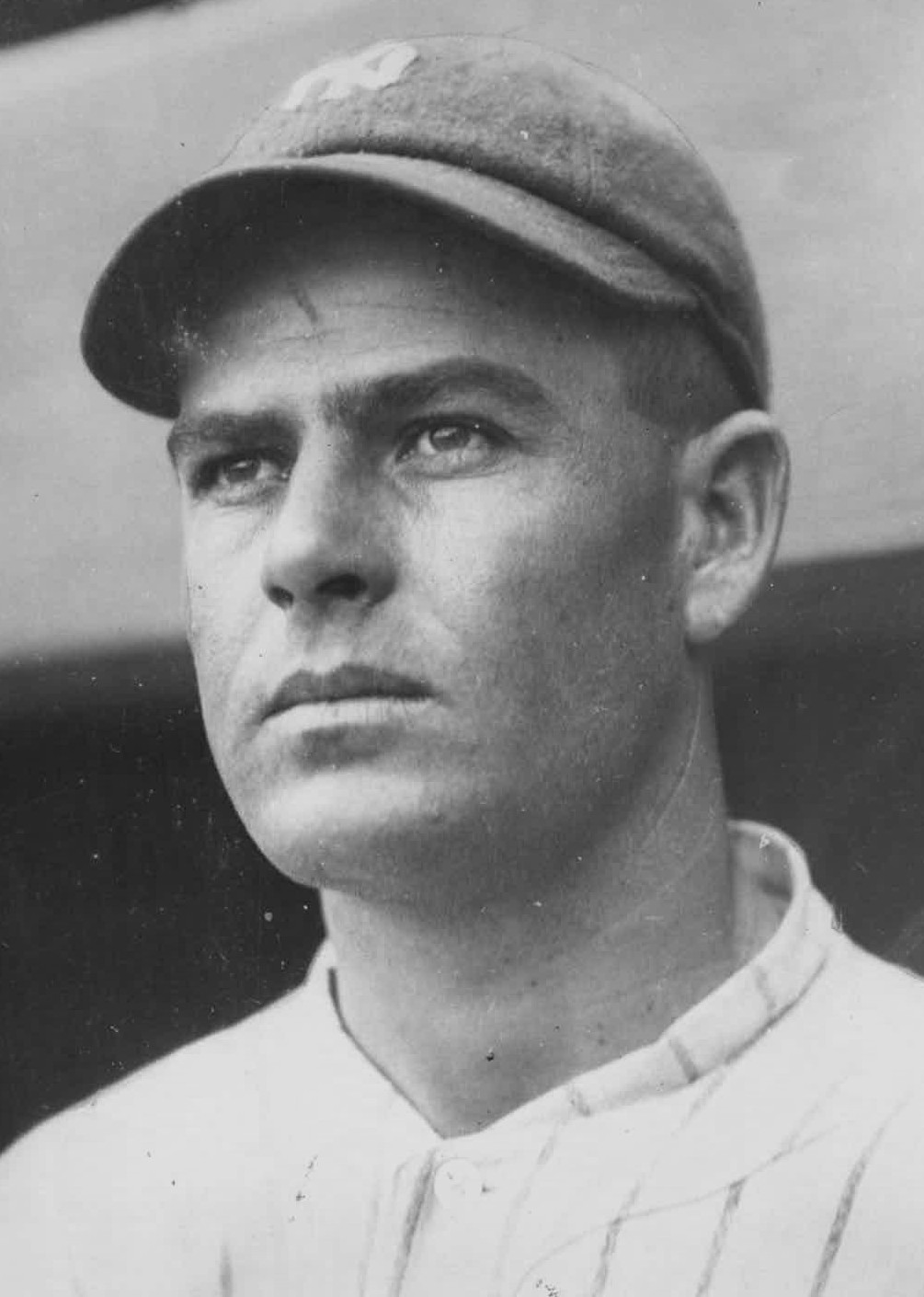
- Right fielder
- Born: July 3, 1896; Beeville, Texas, U.S.
- Died: December 9, 1955 (aged 59); Beeville, Texas, U.S.
- Batted: Left Threw: Right

MLB debut
- September 17, 1919, for the New York Yankees

Last MLB appearance
- September 28, 1930, for the Cincinnati Reds

MLB statistics
- Batting average: .304
- Home runs: 64
- Runs batted in: 688
- Stats at Baseball Reference

Teams
- New York Yankees (1919); New York Giants (1920–1921); Philadelphia Phillies (1921–1924); Cincinnati Reds (1924–1930)

William Curtis Walker (July 3, 1896 – December 9, 1955) was an American professional baseball player who played outfield in the Major Leagues from 1919 to 1930. He played for the Philadelphia Phillies, New York Yankees, Cincinnati Reds, and New York Giants.

Walker hit over .300 six times. His best season was in 1922 with the Phillies, hitting .337 with 12 home runs, 89 RBI, 196 hits, and scoring 102 runs, all career highs. On July 22, 1926, he tied a major league record by hitting 2 triples in an inning as a member of the Reds against the Braves. He was also difficult to strike out, fanning only 254 times in 4,858 at-bats. His career batting average was .304. After his baseball career ended, he worked as a funeral home operator and was later appointed Justice of the Peace in Beeville, Texas, a position he held until his death in 1955.

== Baseball career ==
Walker first appeared in the majors in 1919 (having been sent there from Augusta of the South Atlantic league for $1,000) as a 22-year old rookie with the New York Yankees, appearing on September 17 and going 0-for-1. After being sent back to Augusta, they sold him to the New York Giants for $7,000 on July 27, 1920. He appeared in eight games for the Giants that year, having one hit in 14 at-bats. He finally got more time the following year, appearing in the outfield in 85 games. On July 25, 1921, he was traded along with Butch Henline to the Philadelphia Phillies for Irish Meusel. He batted .301 with 81 hits and 43 RBIs.

He played 148 games for the Phillies in 1922, batting .337 while having 196 hits with 12 home runs and 89 RBIs (all career highs). For the next year, he played in 140 games while batting .281 with 148 hits. He played less in 1924, appearing in 133 games while batting .299. He was traded to the Cincinnati Reds for George Harper on May 30. He played the outfield for the next six seasons for the Reds for teams that were in the midst of a two decade dry-spell. He batted .318 in the 1925 season, having 162 hits with 71 RBIs.

He was released after the 1930 season at the age of 33. He had batted .307 while having 145 hits with 51 RBIs. In a career where he played regularly for ten seasons, he had more walks than strikeouts in all ten of them. Walker's career walk-to-strikeout ratio (535 BB/254 SO) was a solid 2.11.

== Career statistics ==
See baseball statistics for an explanation of these statistics.

G	AB	H	2B	3B	HR	R	RBI	BB	SO	AVG	OBP	SLG	FP
1,359	4,858	1,475	235	117	64	718	688	535	254	.304	.374	.440	.963

== See also ==
- List of Major League Baseball career triples leaders
