= Cliff Lee (outfielder) =

American baseball player (1896–1988)

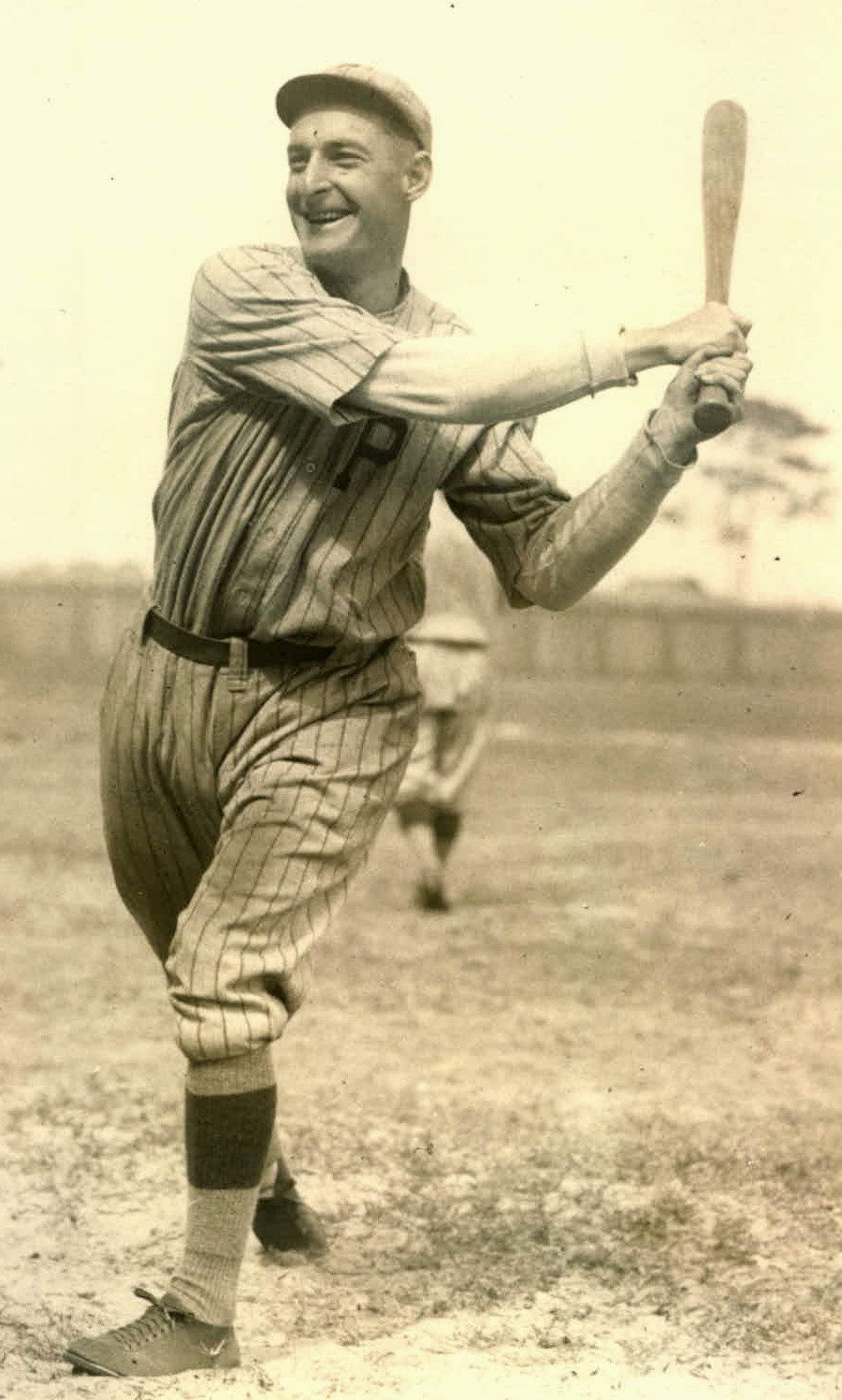
- Outfielder
- Born: August 4, 1896; Lexington, Nebraska, U.S.
- Died: August 25, 1988 (aged 91); Denver, Colorado, U.S.
- Batted: Right Threw: Right

MLB debut
- May 15, 1919, for the Pittsburgh Pirates

Last MLB appearance
- September 8, 1926, for the Cleveland Indians

MLB statistics
- Batting average: .300
- Home runs: 38
- Runs batted in: 216
- Stats at Baseball Reference

Teams
- Pittsburgh Pirates (1919–1920); Philadelphia Phillies (1921–1924); Cleveland Indians (1924); Cincinnati Reds (1925–1926)

Clifford Walker Lee (August 4, 1896 – August 25, 1988) was an American professional baseball outfielder. He played in Major League Baseball (MLB) from 1919 to 1926 for the Pittsburgh Pirates, Philadelphia Phillies, Cleveland Indians, and Cincinnati Reds.

== Career ==
In 521 games over 8 seasons, Lee compiled a .300 batting average (475-for-1583) with 216 runs, 87 doubles, 28 triples, 38 home runs, 216 RBI, 104 base on balls, 186 strikeouts, .344 on-base percentage and .462 slugging percentage. Defensively, he recorded a .975 fielding percentage.
