= José Luis García (baseball) =

Mexican baseball player and manager (1924-2015)

- Outfielder / Manager
- Born: 18 January 1924; Veracruz, Veracruz, Mexico
- Died: 14 October 2015 (aged 91); Mexico City, Mexico
- Batted: Right Threw: Right

José Luis García Cobos (18 January 1924 – 14 October 2015) was a Mexican baseball outfielder and manager. García was dubbed 'Chito', a moniker that he proudly used throughout his life.

García was born in the port of Veracruz, where he earned a degree in naval engineering. Since an early age he was devoted to baseball and football fields, reaching professional status in both sports.

== Baseball career ==
García debuted in 1953 in the Mexican League, playing at left field for the Rojos del Águila de Veracruz before joining the Diablos Rojos del Mexico from 1964 to 1965. Although his leading role in baseball was as a manager, amassing a record of 1385–1436 (.491) in a span of 20 seasons between 1963 and 1984.

His most significant highlight came in 1965, when he led the Tigres de Quintana Roo to the Mexican League championship, guiding a roster comprised only by Mexican ballplayers. In addition, García managed the Mexican national baseball squad in the 1990 Baseball World Cup.

== Football career ==
In between, he was a member of the Tiburones Rojos de Veracruz football club that won the 1945–1946 Liga MX Primera División tournament.

== Death ==
García died on 14 October 2015 in Mexico City, Mexico, at the age of 91. No cause of death was given.
