= Walt Linden =

American baseball player

- Catcher
- Born: March 27, 1924; Chicago, Illinois, U.S.
- Died: September 20, 2013 (aged 89); La Grange Park, Illinois, U.S.
- Batted: Right Threw: Right

MLB debut
- April 30, 1950, for the Boston Braves

Last MLB appearance
- May 8, 1950, for the Boston Braves

MLB statistics
- Batting average: .400
- Home runs: 0
- Runs batted in: 0
- Stats at Baseball Reference

Teams
- Boston Braves (1950)

Walter Charles Linden (March 27, 1924 – September 20, 2013) was an American professional baseball player. Although the catcher's pro career lasted for eight seasons (1946–51; 1953–54), he appeared in only three games at the Major League level for the 1950 Boston Braves. In six plate appearances, he collected two hits and a base on balls. He threw and batted right-handed, stood 6 feet 1 inch (1.85 m) tall and weighed 190 pounds (86 kg).

Born in Chicago, Linden graduated from high school in Berwyn and attended the University of Illinois at Urbana–Champaign. He served in the United States Army during World War II and broke into baseball in the Braves' farm system in 1946.

In 1949, Linden batted .325 in 121 games and was named to the Western League all-star team. He then made the Braves' 1950 roster coming out of spring training and doubled in his first MLB at bat in a pinch hitting role against eventual Baseball Hall of Famer Robin Roberts on April 30. Linden was Boston's starting catcher on May 8, and had a single in three at bats against Gerry Staley of the St. Louis Cardinals in a 10–3 defeat. He was then sent to the Triple-A Milwaukee Brewers at the May cutdown, and spent the remainder of his baseball career in the minors.
