= George Estock =

American baseball player (1924–2010)

- Pitcher
- Born: November 2, 1924; Stirling section of Long Hill Township, New Jersey, U.S.
- Died: November 7, 2010 (aged 86); Sebastian, Florida, U.S.
- Batted: Right Threw: Right

MLB debut
- April 21, 1951, for the Boston Braves

Last MLB appearance
- September 26, 1951, for the Boston Braves

MLB statistics
- Win–loss record: 0–1
- Earned run average: 4.33
- Strikeouts: 11
- Stats at Baseball Reference

Teams
- Boston Braves (1951)

George John Estock (November 2, 1924 – November 7, 2010) was an American professional baseball pitcher born in Stirling, New Jersey. He threw and batted right-handed, stood 6 feet (1.8 m) tall and weighed 185 pounds (84 kg).

Estock graduated from Warren Harding High School in Bridgeport, Connecticut, in 1942 and was pitching in a summer league afterward when baseball scouts began to notice him. The Scranton Red Sox offered him $100 a month and a $100 signing bonus to play ball. Prior to the 1944 season, the parent Boston Red Sox sent him to the Philadelphia Phillies' organization, and in March 1946, Estock was traded to Pittsburgh Pirates to complete an earlier deal. Prior to the 1947 season, the Pirates sent Estock to the Austin Pioneers the Big State League. Three years later, the Braves purchased his contract from Austin.

Estock played for several minor league teams, including the Wilmington Blue Rocks, where his 22 wins in the 1945 season is still a club and Interstate League record.

After being purchased by the Braves, Estock was assigned to Triple-A Milwaukee, where he went 16–8 with a 3.35 earned-run average. That earned him a shot at the big leagues the following year. In 1951, he reached the majors, playing for the Boston Braves alongside future Hall of Famers Johnny Sain and Warren Spahn, who were among the majors' most successful left-handed pitchers.

Estock spent one full season with the Braves, appearing in 37 games, all but one in relief. His only start came in the second game of a doubleheader against the Pirates. He pitched well, giving up three runs in eight innings, but was the loser in what would turn out to be his only big league decision when Cliff Chambers threw a no-hitter against the Braves. Estock finished the year with an 0–1 record and a 4.33 ERA. He managed two hits in seven at-bats for a .286 batting average.

Estock spent 1952 with the minor league Milwaukee Brewers, going 6–3 with a 3.10 ERA. He stayed in baseball until 1955, spending time with the Austin Pioneers, Toledo Mud Hens, Jacksonville Braves, Atlanta Crackers and finishing up with the York White Roses of the Piedmont League in 1955. Estock spent 13 seasons in pro baseball before retiring at age 30.

At his retirement Estock spoke of his introduction to a future Braves Hall of Famer: "I was pitching batting practice to a young kid who was up for a tryout during spring training in 1952. He was hitting me pretty good so I started to put a little extra on the ball, but he just kept it up. He really stood out. I asked him his name, and he answered, 'My name is Hank Aaron.'"

Estock was inducted into the Delaware Sports Hall of Fame in 1988.
