= Ray Shepardson =

American baseball player (1897–1975)

Ray Shepardson (born Little Falls, New York; May 3, 1897 – November 8, 1975) was a baseball player who played catcher for the 1924 St. Louis Cardinals. He batted and threw right handed.
