= Ray Steineder =

American baseball player (1894–1982)

- Pitcher
- Born: November 13, 1894; Salem, New Jersey, U.S.
- Died: August 25, 1982 (aged 87); Vineland, New Jersey, U.S.
- Batted: Right Threw: Right

MLB debut
- July 16, 1923, for the Pittsburgh Pirates

Last MLB appearance
- July 6, 1924, for the Philadelphia Phillies

MLB statistics
- Win–loss record: 3–2
- Earned run average: 4.90
- Strikeouts: 34
- Stats at Baseball Reference

Teams
- Pittsburgh Pirates (1923–1924); Philadelphia Phillies (1924)

Raymond Steineder (November 13, 1894 – August 25, 1982) was an American Major League Baseball pitcher. Steineder played for the Pittsburgh Pirates in 1923 and 1924, and the Philadelphia Phillies in 1924.
