= Marty Krug =

American baseball player (1888–1966)

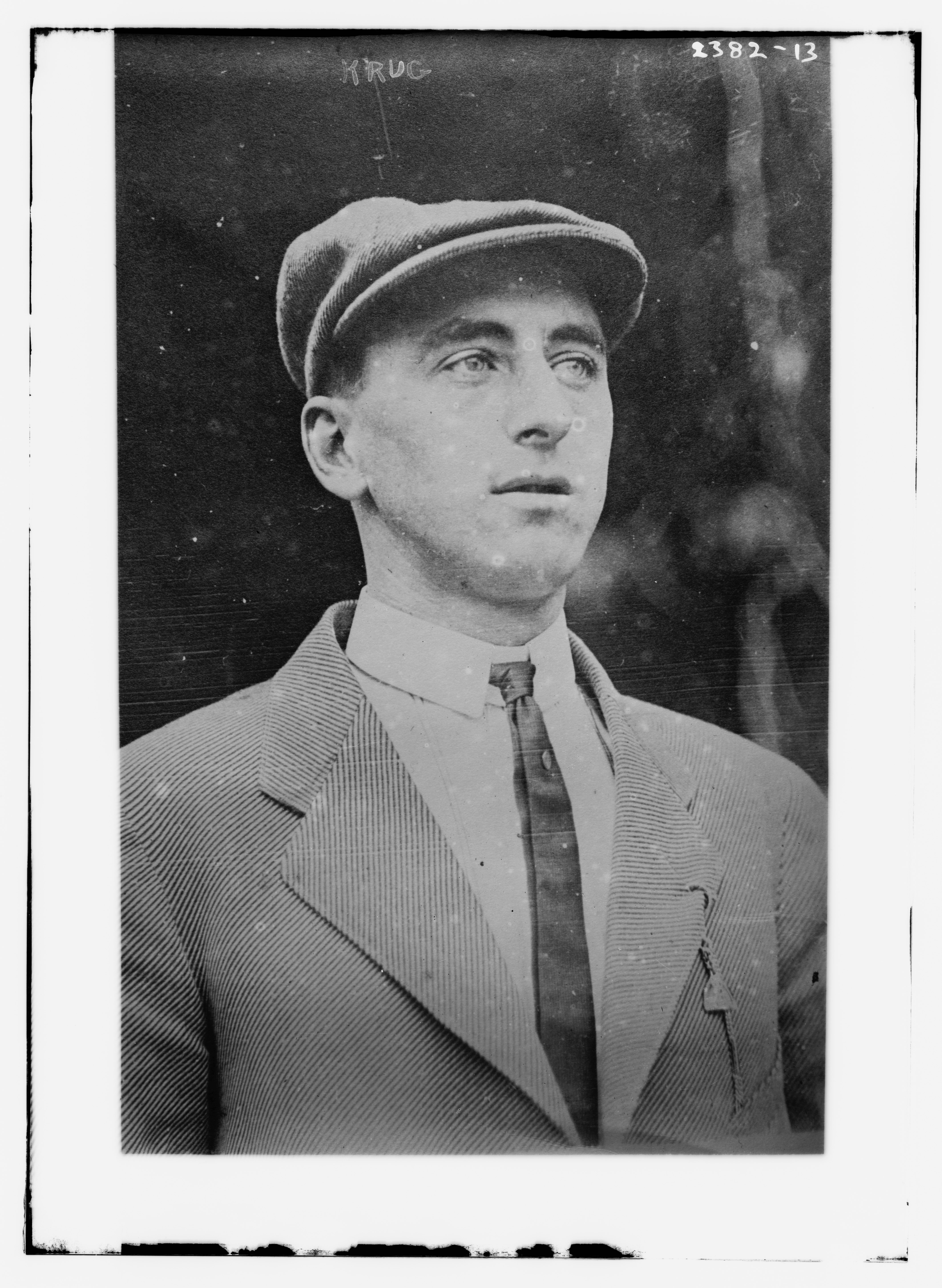
- Third baseman
- Born: Martin Johannes Krieg; September 10, 1888; Koblenz, Rhenish Prussia, German Empire
- Died: June 27, 1966 (aged 77); Glendale, California, U.S.
- Batted: Right Threw: Right

MLB debut
- May 29, 1912, for the Boston Red Sox

Last MLB appearance
- September 27, 1922, for the Chicago Cubs

MLB statistics
- Batting average: .278
- Home runs: 4
- Runs batted in: 67
- Stats at Baseball Reference

Teams
- Boston Red Sox (1912); Chicago Cubs (1922)

Career highlights and awards
- World Series champion (1912)

Martin John Krug (born Martin Johannes Krieg; 10 September 1888 – 27 June 1966) was an American professional baseball infielder who played in the major leagues with the Boston Red Sox (1912) and Chicago Cubs (1922). Born in Koblenz, German Empire, his parents immigrated to the United States, and he was raised in Cleveland, Ohio. He was a backup shortstop for the 1912 World Series champion Red Sox, but had little opportunity to play behind starter Heinie Wagner. He was primarily a third baseman for the 1922 Cubs. Krug died in Glendale, Illinois, in 1966.
