= Jeff Pfeffer =

American baseball player (1888–1972)

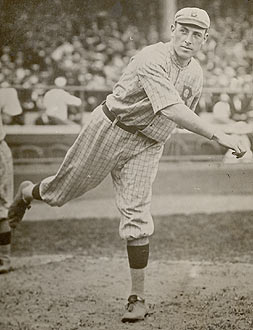
- Pitcher
- Born: March 4, 1888; Seymour, Illinois, U.S.
- Died: August 15, 1972 (aged 84); Chicago, Illinois, U.S.
- Batted: Right Threw: Right

MLB debut
- April 16, 1911, for the St. Louis Browns

Last MLB appearance
- September 26, 1924, for the Pittsburgh Pirates

MLB statistics
- Win–loss record: 158–112
- Earned run average: 2.77
- Strikeouts: 836
- Stats at Baseball Reference

Teams
- St. Louis Browns (1911); Brooklyn Dodgers/Robins (1913–1921); St. Louis Cardinals (1921–1924); Pittsburgh Pirates (1924)

Edward Joseph Pfeffer (March 4, 1888 – August 15, 1972) was an American pitcher for the St. Louis Browns (1911), Brooklyn Dodgers/Robins (1913–1921), St. Louis Cardinals (1921–1924) and Pittsburgh Pirates (1924). His older brother Francis was known as Big Jeff Pfeffer.

Pfeffer helped the Robins win the 1916 and 1920 National League pennants. In the 1916 World Series, he recorded a save in Game 3 and was the hard-luck losing pitcher of the series-ending Game 5.

On March 25, 1920, in the top of the first inning during an exhibition game against the New York Yankees, Pfeffer threw a pitch that struck Yankees second baseman Chick Fewster in the temple, knocking him unconscious for approximately ten minutes. Fewster suffered a fractured skull and concussion, and temporarily lost his ability to speak.

Pfeffer led the National League in hit batsmen in 1916 (17) and 1917 (16). In 1916 he gave up Rogers Hornsby's first home run. In 13 seasons, Pfeffer had a 158–112 win–loss record with 10 saves in 347 games.

As of the end of the 2014 season, Pfeffer ranked 96th on the MLB career ERA list (2.77) and tied for 73rd on the MLB career hit batsmen list (105). He is the Dodgers' career leader in ERA (2.31).

Pfeffer died in Chicago at the age of 84, and is interred at Rock Island National Cemetery.

== See also ==
- Top 100 Major League Baseball hit batsmen leaders

== Sources ==
- Career statistics from Baseball Reference · Baseball Reference (Minors) · Retrosheet · Baseball Almanac

Preceded by Ed Reulbach	Brooklyn Robins Opening Day; Starting pitcher 1915	Succeeded by Larry Cheney
