= 1924 in baseball =

The following are the baseball events of the year 1924 throughout the world.

== Champions ==
- World Series: Washington Senators over New York Giants (4–3)
- First Negro World Series: Kansas City Monarchs over Hilldale Club (5–4–1)

== Awards and honors ==
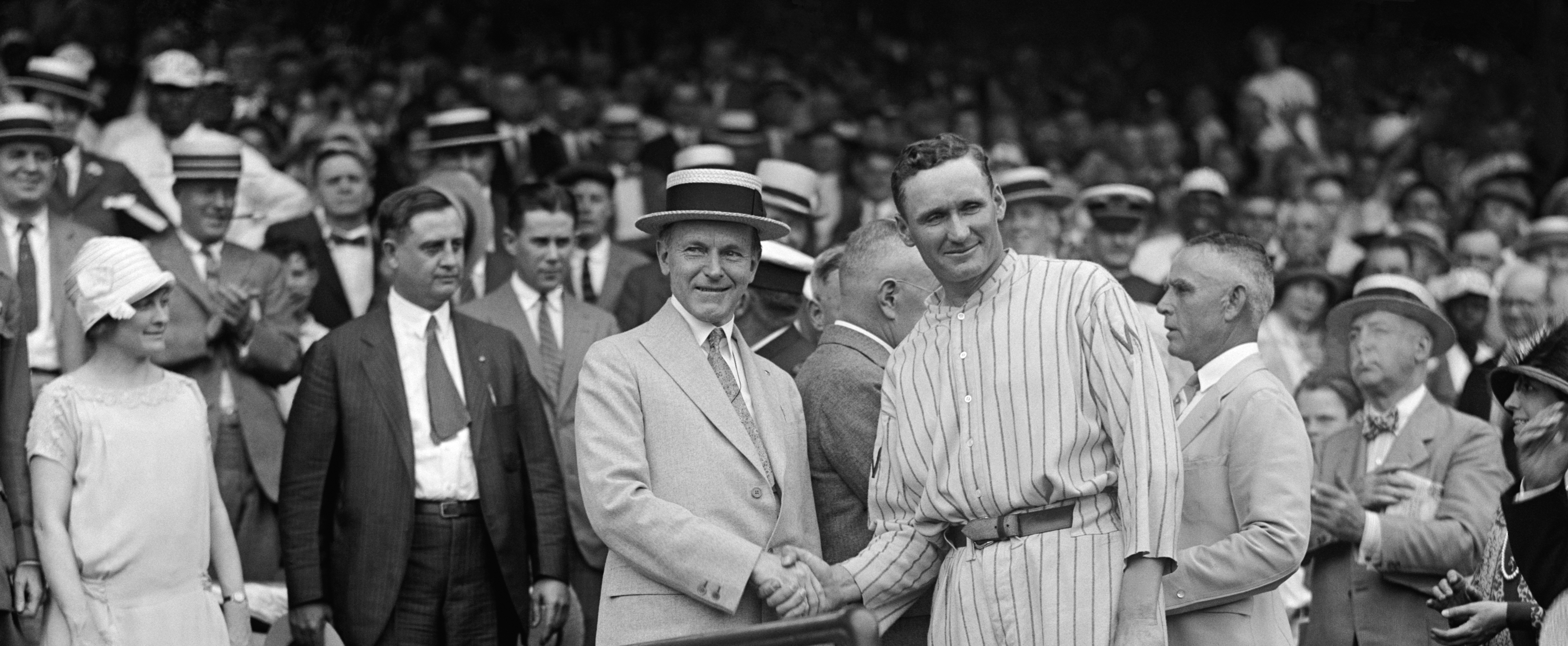
President Calvin Coolidge (left) presents Washington Senators pitcher Walter Johnson (right) with the American League diploma.

- League Award
  - Walter Johnson, Washington Senators, P
  - Dazzy Vance, Brooklyn Dodgers, P

== Statistical leaders ==
	American League		National League		Eastern Colored League		Negro National League	
Stat	Player	Total	Player	Total	Player	Total	Player	Total
AVG	Babe Ruth (NYY)	.378	Rogers Hornsby (STL)	.424	Oscar Charleston^{3} (HBG)	.405	Valentín Dreke (CUB)	.389
HR	Babe Ruth (NYY)	46	Jack Fournier (BRO)	27	Oscar Charleston^{3} (HBG)	15	Bill Pierce (DTS); Turkey Stearnes (DTS)	9
RBI	Goose Goslin (WSH)	129	George Kelly (NYG)	136	Oscar Charleston^{3} (HBG)	63	Cristóbal Torriente (CAG)	81
W	Walter Johnson^{1} (WSH)	23	Dazzy Vance^{2} (BRO)	28	Nip Winters (HIL)	20	Bullet Rogan (KCM)	16
ERA	Walter Johnson^{1} (WSH)	2.72	Dazzy Vance^{2} (BRO)	2.16	Dave Brown (NYL)	2.00	Bill Foster (MEM/CAG)	2.16
K	Walter Johnson^{1} (WSH)	158	Dazzy Vance^{2} (BRO)	262	Nip Winters (HIL)	114	Sam Streeter (BBB)	128

^{1} American League Triple Crown pitching winner
^{2} National League Triple Crown pitching winner
^{3} Eastern Colored League Triple Crown batting winner

== Major league baseball final standings ==
=== American League final standings ===
American League
Team	W	L	Pct.	GB	Home	Road
Washington Senators	92	62	.597	—	47‍–‍30	45‍–‍32
New York Yankees	89	63	.586	2	45‍–‍32	44‍–‍31
Detroit Tigers	86	68	.558	6	45‍–‍33	41‍–‍35
St. Louis Browns	74	78	.487	17	41‍–‍36	33‍–‍42
Philadelphia Athletics	71	81	.467	20	36‍–‍39	35‍–‍42
Cleveland Indians	67	86	.438	24½	37‍–‍38	30‍–‍48
Boston Red Sox	67	87	.435	25	41‍–‍36	26‍–‍51
Chicago White Sox	66	87	.431	25½	37‍–‍39	29‍–‍48

Locations of teams for the 1923–1931 American League seasons
American League

=== National League final standings ===
National League
Team	W	L	Pct.	GB	Home	Road
New York Giants	93	60	.608	—	51‍–‍26	42‍–‍34
Brooklyn Robins	92	62	.597	1½	46‍–‍31	46‍–‍31
Pittsburgh Pirates	90	63	.588	3	49‍–‍28	41‍–‍35
Cincinnati Reds	83	70	.542	10	43‍–‍33	40‍–‍37
Chicago Cubs	81	72	.529	12	46‍–‍31	35‍–‍41
St. Louis Cardinals	65	89	.422	28½	40‍–‍37	25‍–‍52
Philadelphia Phillies	55	96	.364	37	26‍–‍49	29‍–‍47
Boston Braves	53	100	.346	40	28‍–‍48	25‍–‍52

Locations of teams for the 1920–1931 National League seasons
National League

== Negro leagues final standings ==
All Negro leagues standings below are per MLB and Seamheads.

=== Eastern Colored League final standings ===
vs. Eastern Colored League						vs. Major Black teams			
Eastern Colored League	W	L	T	Pct.	GB	W	L	T	Pct.
Hilldale Club	46	24	0	.657	—	47	25	0	.653
Baltimore Black Sox	37	23	0	.617	4	38	23	0	.623
New York Lincoln Giants	33	28	1	.540	8½	36	31	1	.537
Atlantic City Bacharach Giants	35	32	2	.522	9½	36	32	2	.529
Harrisburg Giants	30	31	0	.492	11½	30	31	0	.492
Brooklyn Royal Giants	15	25	1	.378	16	15	25	1	.378
Washington Potomacs	21	38	1	.356	19½	21	40	1	.344
Cuban Stars (East)	16	32	1	.337	19	17	32	1	.350

Locations of teams for the 1924 Eastern Colored League season
Eastern Colored League
Traveling team: Cuban Stars (East)

=== Negro National League final standings ===
vs. Negro National League						vs. Major Black teams			
Negro National League	W	L	T	Pct.	GB	W	L	T	Pct.
Kansas City Monarchs	57	22	0	.722	—	57	22	0	.722
Chicago American Giants	51	26	0	.662	5	56	27	0	.675
Detroit Stars	35	28	1	.555	14	35	31	1	.530
St. Louis Stars	42	40	0	.512	16½	43	41	0	.512
Birmingham Black Barons	30	41	3	.426	23	37	45	4	.453
Memphis Red Sox†	17	25	2	.409	21½	27	38	3	.419
Cuban Stars (West)	17	33	0	.340	25½	18	35	0	.340
Cleveland Browns	15	32	0	.319	26	16	33	0	.327
Indianapolis ABCs†	3	20	2	.160	26	5	21	2	.214

†Indianapolis dropped out of the league in June and was replaced by Memphis.

Locations of teams for the 1924 Negro National League season
Negro National League
Traveling team: Cuban Stars (West)

=== Independent teams final standings ===
A loose confederation of teams existed that were not part of either established leagues.

vs. All Teams
Independent Clubs	W	L	T	Pct.	GB
Homestead Grays	4	4	1	.500	—
St. Louis Giants	3	5	1	.389	1

== Events ==
- February 16 – Tony Boeckel, a third baseman for the Boston Braves, dies from injuries suffered in a car accident the previous day in San Diego. Yankees outfielder Bob Meusel was also in the car, which was driven by Bob Albright, who was a theater man from Los Angeles. Meusel and Albright escaped the crash with suffering serious injuries. Boeckel becomes the first major league player to die due to a car accident.
- April 15
  - On opening day, two future Hall of Famers make their major league debuts, as Al Simmons makes his major league debut in the Philadelphia Athletics' season opener with the Washington Senators, and Freddie Lindstrom appears in the New York Giants opener with the Brooklyn Robins.
  - The contest between the Boston Braves and Philadelphia Phillies at the Baker Bowl ends in a 6–6 tie.
- April 16 – Earle Combs makes his major league debut pinch hitting for Sad Sam Jones in the New York Yankees' 9–6 loss to the Boston Red Sox.
- May 1 – Bill Barrett of the Chicago White Sox steals home in both the first and ninth inning of a game. In that game Chicago beat the Cleveland Indians 13–7.
- May 23 – Walter Johnson strikes out six straight hitters en route to a fourteen strike out performance and a 4–0 over the Chicago White Sox.
- May 31 – Red Ruffing gives up five hits and three earned runs in his major league debut.
- June 26 – Jesse Barnes opposed Virgil Barnes in the first pitching matchup of brothers in major league history. Virgil did not have a decision while Jesse was credited with the loss as the New York Giants won the Boston Braves‚ 8–1. The Barnes brothers will match up four more times during their careers.
- July 11 – Chicago Cubs first baseman Lee Cotter ties a major league record 21 put outs and one assist. However, the Cubs fall to the Dodgers 9–1.
- July 14 – Rogers Hornsby goes three-for-four in the St. Louis Cardinals' 12–0 victory over the Brooklyn Robins to raise his season average to .402. His average remains above .400 for the remainder of the season.
- July 17 – Jesse Haines of the St. Louis Cardinals pitches a no-hitter against the Boston Braves in a 5–0 win.
- July 18 – The St. Louis Cardinals release pitcher Jeff Pfeffer. Pfeffer had flirted with what would have been his third 20-game win season just two years prior. He would sign on later with the Pittsburgh Pirates, and retire after the season.
- July 30 – The Philadelphia Athletics purchase the contract of sixteen year old Jimmie Foxx from Eastern of the eastern Shore league for $2,000. Fox would make his MLB debut the next season at the age of 17, en route to a hall of fame career.
- August 27 – The New York Yankees are shut out for only the second time all season, 1–0 by Stan Coveleski and the Cleveland Indians.
- August 28
  - The New York Yankees and Washington Senators open a crucial four-game series at Yankee Stadium for first place in the American League. The Senators win 11–6 and take three of the four games of the series to leave New York with a 1.5 game lead.
  - Despite future Hall of Famer Chick Hafey making his major league debut in both games of their double header, the St. Louis Cardinals lose to the Chicago Cubs, 5–2 and 8–3. Hafey collects his first major league hit in the second game.
- September 6 – The Boston Braves beat the Brooklyn Robins in the second game of a double header, 5–4, ending Brooklyn's fifteen-game winning streak.
- September 7 – In a crucial battle for first place in the National League, the New York Giants defeat the Brooklyn Robins, 8–7, to increase their lead in the NL to 1.5 games.
- September 16 – St. Louis Cardinals first baseman Jim Bottomley drives in twelve runs in the Cardinals' 17–3 victory over the Brooklyn Robins.
- September 20 – Grover Cleveland Alexander of the Chicago Cubs records his 300th career win.
- September 22 – With his Detroit Tigers holding a commanding lead over the Boston Red Sox, manager Ty Cobb brings in young prospect Charlie Gehringer as a defensive replacement at short. He does not log an at-bat in his major league debut.
- September 28 – The Brooklyn Robins' Dazzy Vance pitches a gem to earn his league leading 28th win of the season over the Boston Braves. Vance also leads the league with a 2.16 earned run average and 262 strikeouts to earn the National League's first ever MVP award.
- October 1 – Sen Kaney makes history calling the first live radio broadcast of a major league baseball game. Kaney is seated in the grandstand behind home plate, calling the game as the Cubs defeated the White Sox 10–7.
- October 4 – With the New York Giants up 2–1, the Washington Senators' Roger Peckinpaugh doubles in Ossie Bluege to send game one of the World Series goes into extra innings tied at two. The New York Giants score two in the twelfth, and win it, 4–3. The Giants became the first team to play in four consecutive World Series, winning in 1921 & 1922 and losing in 1923. Their long-time manager, John McGraw, made his ninth and final World Series appearance.
- October 5 – Goose Goslin hits a two-run home run in the first inning to put the Washington Senators up 2–0 in game two of the World Series. The Giants tie it in the top of the Ninth, only to lose it in the bottom of the ninth on an RBI double by Roger Peckinpaugh.
- October 6 – At the Polo Grounds, the New York Giants win game three of the World Series, 6–4.
- October 7 – A three-run home run by Goose Goslin powers the Washington Senators past the New York Giants in game four of the World Series.
- October 8 – American League MVP Walter Johnson takes his second loss of the 1924 World Series, as the New York Giants beat him and the Washington Senators, 6–2.
- October 9 – With two outs in the fifth inning, Bucky Harris drives in two runs with a single to right, and the Senators win game six of the World Series, 2–1.
- October 10 – The Washington Senators defeat the New York Giants, 4–3, in twelve innings, in Game seven of the World Series to win their first World Championship. This was the second extra-inning World Series–deciding game (1912) and the last before 1991. The 1991 World Series is won by the very same franchise, by then known as the Minnesota Twins.

== Births ==
=== January ===
- January 1:
  - Charlie Bishop
  - Arleene Johnson
  - Earl Torgeson
- January 5 – Fred Marsh
- January 7 – Jim Pendleton
- January 9 – John Hall
- January 16 – Junior Wooten
- January 18 – José Luis García

=== February ===
- February 4 – Dorothy Harrell
- February 6 – Dorothy Montgomery
- February 7 – Paul Owens
- February 8 – Joe Black
- February 11 – Hal Rice
- February 19 – Margie Lang
- February 20 – Sal Yvars
- February 21 – Lloyd Hittle
- February 23 – Phil Haugstad
- February 25 – Jack Lohrke
- February 29 – Al Rosen

=== March ===
- March 1:
  - Wilmer Harris
  - Tim Thompson
- March 2 – Cal Abrams
- March 4 – Jack Brittin
- March 5 – Ramón García
- March 6:
  - Ed Mierkowicz
  - Bud Podbielan
- March 8 – Toby Atwell
- March 10 – John Perkovich
- March 18 – Garvin Hamner
- March 27 – Walt Linden

=== April ===
- April 2 – Bobby Ávila
- April 4 – Gil Hodges
- April 6 – Tokuji Iida
- April 18 – Jim Zapp
- April 20 – Jim Bilbrey
- April 23 – Chuck Harmon
- April 25 – Art Schallock
- April 27:
  - Bill Higdon
  - Frank Wurm
- April 29 – Freddy Rodríguez

=== May ===
- May 5 – Mildred Meacham
- May 7 – Al Cihocki
- May 11:
  - Frank Campos
  - Helen Filarski
- May 13 – Cliff Fannin
- May 21 – Ed Fitz Gerald
- May 23 – Clyde King
- May 24 – Hubert Simmons
- May 27 – Tom Hurd
- May 29 – Pepper Paire
- May 30 – Turk Lown

=== June ===
- June 3 – George Armstrong
- June 4 – June Emerson
- June 5 – Lou Brissie
- June 16:
  - Jane Jacobs
  - Ernie Johnson
- June 18:
  - Erma Bergmann
  - Marie Kruckel
- June 19 – Jim Blackburn
- June 23 – Harry Schaeffer

=== July ===
- July 1:
  - Jack Bruner
  - Ken Wood
- July 6 – Frank Kellert
- July 7 – John Simmons
- July 11 – Al Federoff
- July 15 – Bob Barthelson
- July 20 – Claude Crocker
- July 24 – Tod Davis
- July 26 – Milt Welch
- July 28 – Marie Menheer

=== August ===
- August 2 – Lloyd Merriman
- August 5:
  - Rube Novotney
  - Eddie Yuhas
- August 6 – Van Fletcher
- August 15:
  - Mary Lawson
  - Frank Whitman
- August 17 – Larry Ciaffone
- August 20 – George Zuverink
- August 21:
  - Jack Buck
  - Vern Fear
- August 23 – Sherm Lollar
- August 26 – Alex Kellner
- August 29 – Wayne McLeland
- August 30 – Frank Sacka
- August 31 – Adeline Kerrar

=== September ===
- September 1 – Ed Samcoff
- September 3 – Bill Greason
- September 4 – León Kellman
- September 6:
  - Jim Fridley
  - Hal Jeffcoat
  - George Schmees
- September 10 – Ted Kluszewski
- September 11:
  - Pauline Crawley
  - Lou Grasmick
- September 12:
  - George Bradshaw
  - Bubba Church
- September 14:
  - Patricia Barringer
  - Jerry Coleman
- September 15 – Jim Davis
- September 19 – Vern Benson
- September 21 – Marie Mahoney
- September 23 – Dino Restelli
- September 25 – Red Webb
- September 26 – Eddie Erautt
- September 27 – Jerry Scala
- September 29 – Ed McGhee

=== October ===
- October 1 – Betty Russell
- October 2 – Bill Serena
- October 13 – Charlie Silvera
- October 14:
  - Dave Jolly
  - Bill Renna
- October 16 – Bob Cain
- October 22 – Ernestine Petras
- October 25 – Bobby Brown
- October 29 – Hal Bamberger
- October 31 – Dee Fondy

=== November ===
- November 2 – George Estock
- November 5 – Sonny Dixon
- November 11 – Evelyn Wawryshyn
- November 12 – Andy Hansen
- November 18 – Rocky Nelson
- November 21 – Warren Hacker
- November 23 – Josephine D'Angelo
- November 24 – Joanne Winter
- November 27 – Cal Howe
- November 29 – Irv Noren

=== December ===
- December 2 – Sylvia Wronski
- December 3 – Fred Taylor
- December 9 – Jerry Fahr
- December 11 – Hal Brown
- December 13 – George Shuba
- December 18 – Geraldine Bureker
- December 19:
  - Rex Barney
  - Herb Gorman
- December 21 – Marge Villa
- December 23 – Bob Marquis
- December 24 – Chico García
- December 28 – Steve Kuczek
- December 31 – Ted Gray

== Deaths ==
=== January ===
- January 4 – John Peters, 73, 19th century shortstop for four clubs, including the pennant-winning 1876 Chicago White Stockings in the very first year of the National League.
- January 9 – George Hodson, 55, pitcher.
- January 15 – Pat Friel, 63, American Association outfielder who played from 1890 to 1891 for the Syracuse Stars and Philadelphia Athletics.

=== February ===
- February 7 – George Kahler, 34, pitcher.
- February 16 – Pop-Boy Smith, 31, pitcher.
- February 27 – Thomas Lynch, 65, National League president from 1910 through 1913, previously a highly regarded umpire from 1888 to 1899.

=== March ===
- March 7 – Pat Moran, 48, catcher/third baseman for three National League teams from 1901 through 1914, including the 1907 Chicago Cubs World Champion team, who later became the first manager to lead two different teams to their first-ever modern-era National League championships, the 1915 Philadelphia Phillies and the 1919 Cincinnati Reds, capturing the 1919 World Series title.
- March 8 – Myron Allen, 69, outfielder/pitcher for four teams in two different leagues from 1883 through 1888.
- March 17 – Bill Harbridge, 68, catcher/outfielder for five teams of three different leagues between the 1875 and 1884 seasons.

=== April ===
- April 4 – George Wood, 65, left fielder in 13 seasons from 1880 to 1892, mainly for the Detroit Wolverines and the Philadelphia Athletics, who posted a .300 average twice and led the National League in home runs in 1882.
- April 8 – Jimmy Macullar, 69, infielder/outfielder/pitcher for three teams between 1879 and 1886, who holds a Major League lifetime record for the most games played at shortstop for a left-handed thrower with 325 appearances in the position, while leading the American Association in putouts at outfield in 1882 and as a shortstop in 1885.
- April 16 – Buster Hoover, 61, utility infielder/outfielder for four teams between 1884 and 1892.
- April 26 – Moxie Manuel, 42, pitcher.
- April 28 – Barney McFadden, 47, pitcher.

=== May ===
- May 9 – Bill Wilson, 56, catcher.
- May 11:
  - John Stedronsky, 73, third baseman.
  - Fleet Walker, 67, catcher for the 1884 Toledo Blue Stockings, who is credited with being the first African American to play professional baseball.
- May 15 – Ed Swartwood, 65, right fielder/first baseman who topped the American Association in batting average during the 1883 season, led the league in runs, doubles and total bases the following season, and later became an umpire.
- May 16 – Candy Cummings, 75, Hall of Fame pitcher credited with developing the curveball in 1867, who won 28 or more games for four teams of the National Association and later became a Minor League executive.
- May 25 – Carl Weilman, 34, pitcher who posted an 84–93 record and a 2.67 earned run average in 239 games for the American League St. Louis Browns between 1912 and 1920.
- May 26 – Ed MacGamwell, 46, first baseman.

=== June ===
- June 2 – Jim Hughes, 50, pitcher for the Baltimore Orioles and Brooklyn Superbas National League clubs, who led the league's pitchers with 28 wins in the 1899 season.
- June 5 – Bill Reynolds, 39, catcher.
- June 5 – John Sullivan, 51, catcher.
- June 23 – Shorty Gallagher, 52, outfielder.

=== July ===
- July 3 – Ed Householder, 54, outfielder.
- July 9 – Bill McCloskey, 70, catcher and outfielder.
- July 27 – Bob Dresser, 45, pitcher.

=== August ===
- August 4 – George Nicol, 53, pitcher and outfielder.
- August 17 – John E. Bruce, 67, secretary of the National Commission from 1903 to 1920, previously legal counsel to American League president and also part owner of the St. Louis Browns from 1902 to 1916.
- August 19 – Bill Keister, 53, middle infielder for seven different teams in seven seasons, who led the American League with 21 triples in 1901.

=== September ===
- September 3 – Herman Pitz, 59, catcher.
- September 7 – Bob Spade, 47, pitcher.
- September 15 – Frank Chance, 47, Hall of Fame first baseman and manager of the Chicago Cubs, who anchored famed infield of four National League and two World Series champions from 1906 to 1910; batted .300 four times; topped the league in runs once and steals twice; led the 1906 squad to a winning-record 116 games, while collecting a career-winning percentage of .593 (second highest among managers of 1500 or more games), and stole 401 bases to set a career-mark for first basemen.
- September 18 – Bill Geiss, 66, pitcher for the 1882 Baltimore Orioles and second baseman for the 1884 Detroit Wolverines.
- September 24 – Dan McFarlan, 50, pitcher.

=== October ===
- October 9:
  - Ed Caskin, 72, shortstop.
  - Jake Daubert, 40, first baseman who compiled a .303 career average with 2,326 hits in 2,014 career games for Brooklyn (1910–1918) and Cincinnati (1919 until his death); won batting titles in 1913 and 1914, and led the National League in triples two times; 1913 NL Most Valuable Player; captain for pennant winners in Brooklyn and Cincinnati and member of the Reds' 1919 World Series champions.
- October 27 – Percy Haughton, 48, renowned Ivy League football coach (Harvard, Cornell, Columbia) who was president and co-owner of the Boston Braves from 1916 to 1918.
- October 29 – Pop Snyder, 70, catcher for several teams over 18 seasons including 1878 Boston champions; also managed Cincinnati to 1882 American Association pennant.

=== November ===
- November 2 – Toss Kelly, 62, American League umpire who officiated 67 games in 1905 between April 15 and July 11.
- November 6 – Emil Leber, 43, third baseman.
- November 14 – Joe Quest, 71, second baseman for 10 seasons. Started for three Chicago White Stockings championship teams.

=== December ===
- December 1:
  - Dolly Stark, 39, murdered, who played at shortstop for the Cleveland Naps and the Brooklyn Dodgers from 1909 through 1912.
  - Dummy Stephenson, 55, outfielder.
- December 11 – Moxie Hengel, 67, second baseman.
- December 14 – Chappie McFarland, 49, pitcher.
- December 17 – Pat Dealy, 63, catcher.
- December 20 – Jimmy Woulfe, 65, outfielder.
- December 24 – Doc Gessler, 44, Major League outfielder during eight seasons, who later managed in the outlaw Federal League for the 1914 Pittsburgh Rebels.
- December 29 – Bill White, 64, shortstop in five season from 1883 to 1888.
