= 1924 Major League Baseball season =

1924 MLB season
- League: American League (AL); National League (NL)
- Sport: Baseball
- Duration: Regular season: April 15 – September 30, 1924 (AL); April 15 – September 29, 1924 (NL); World Series: October 4–10, 1924
- Games: 154
- Teams: 16 (8 per league)

Regular Season
- Season MVP: AL: Walter Johnson (WSH); NL: Dazzy Vance (BRO)
- AL champions: Washington Senators
- AL runners-up: New York Yankees
- NL champions: New York Giants
- NL runners-up: Brooklyn Robins

World Series
- Champions: Washington Senators
- Runners-up: New York Giants

MLB seasons
- ← 1923 1925 →

Locations of teams for the 1923–1931 American League seasons
American League
Locations of teams for the 1920–1931 National League seasons
National League

The 1924 major league baseball season began on April 15, 1924. The regular season ended on September 30, with the New York Giants and Washington Senators as the regular season champions of the National League and American League, respectively. The postseason began with Game 1 of the 21st World Series on October 4 and ended with Game 7 on October 10. The Senators defeated the Giants, four games to three, capturing their first championship in franchise history. Going into the season, the defending World Series champions were the New York Yankees from the 1923 season.

This was the third of eight seasons that "League Awards", a precursor to the Major League Baseball Most Valuable Player Award (introduced in 1931), were issued.

== Schedule ==
The 1924 schedule consisted of 154 games for all teams in the American League and National League, each of which had eight teams. Each team was scheduled to play 22 games against the other seven teams of their respective league. This continued the format put in place since the 1904 season (except for 1919) and would be used until 1961 in the American League and 1962 in the National League.

Opening Day, April 15, featured all sixteen teams, for the first time since 1922. The National League would see its final day of the regular season on September 29, while the American League would see its final day of the regular season the following day with a game between the Washington Senators and Boston Red Sox. The World Series took place between October 4 and October 10.

== Rule changes ==
The 1924 season saw the following rule changes:

- Commissioner Kenesaw Mountain Landis was given "appellate powers in determining a dispute over a contract or right to services" by an umpire.
- Coaches no longer count towards the player limit.

== Teams ==
League	Team	City	Ballpark	Capacity	Manager
American League	Boston Red Sox	Boston, Massachusetts	Fenway Park	27,000	Lee Fohl
American League	Chicago White Sox	Chicago, Illinois	Comiskey Park	28,000	Johnny Evers
American League	Chicago White Sox	Chicago, Illinois	Comiskey Park	28,000	Ed Walsh
American League	Chicago White Sox	Chicago, Illinois	Comiskey Park	28,000	Eddie Collins
American League	Cleveland Indians	Cleveland, Ohio	Dunn Field	21,414	Tris Speaker
American League	Detroit Tigers	Detroit, Michigan	Navin Field	30,000	Ty Cobb
American League	New York Yankees	New York, New York	Yankee Stadium	58,000	Miller Huggins
American League	Philadelphia Athletics	Philadelphia, Pennsylvania	Shibe Park	23,000	Connie Mack
American League	St. Louis Browns	St. Louis, Missouri	Sportsman's Park	24,040	George Sisler
American League	Washington Senators	Washington, D.C.	Griffith Stadium	27,000	Bucky Harris
National League	Boston Braves	Boston, Massachusetts	Braves Field	40,000	Dave Bancroft
National League	Brooklyn Robins	New York, New York	Ebbets Field	26,000	Wilbert Robinson
National League	Chicago Cubs	Chicago, Illinois	Cubs Park	20,000	Bill Killefer
National League	Cincinnati Reds	Cincinnati, Ohio	Redland Field	20,696	Jack Hendricks
National League	New York Giants	New York, New York	Polo Grounds	43,000	John McGraw
National League	New York Giants	New York, New York	Polo Grounds	43,000	Hughie Jennings
National League	Philadelphia Phillies	Philadelphia, Pennsylvania	Baker Bowl	18,000	Art Fletcher
National League	Pittsburgh Pirates	Pittsburgh, Pennsylvania	Forbes Field	25,000	Bill McKechnie
National League	St. Louis Cardinals	St. Louis, Missouri	Sportsman's Park	24,040	Branch Rickey

== Standings ==
=== American League ===
American League
Team	W	L	Pct.	GB	Home	Road
Washington Senators	92	62	.597	—	47‍–‍30	45‍–‍32
New York Yankees	89	63	.586	2	45‍–‍32	44‍–‍31
Detroit Tigers	86	68	.558	6	45‍–‍33	41‍–‍35
St. Louis Browns	74	78	.487	17	41‍–‍36	33‍–‍42
Philadelphia Athletics	71	81	.467	20	36‍–‍39	35‍–‍42
Cleveland Indians	67	86	.438	24½	37‍–‍38	30‍–‍48
Boston Red Sox	67	87	.435	25	41‍–‍36	26‍–‍51
Chicago White Sox	66	87	.431	25½	37‍–‍39	29‍–‍48

=== National League ===
National League
Team	W	L	Pct.	GB	Home	Road
New York Giants	93	60	.608	—	51‍–‍26	42‍–‍34
Brooklyn Robins	92	62	.597	1½	46‍–‍31	46‍–‍31
Pittsburgh Pirates	90	63	.588	3	49‍–‍28	41‍–‍35
Cincinnati Reds	83	70	.542	10	43‍–‍33	40‍–‍37
Chicago Cubs	81	72	.529	12	46‍–‍31	35‍–‍41
St. Louis Cardinals	65	89	.422	28½	40‍–‍37	25‍–‍52
Philadelphia Phillies	55	96	.364	37	26‍–‍49	29‍–‍47
Boston Braves	53	100	.346	40	28‍–‍48	25‍–‍52

=== Tie games ===
7 tie games (5 in AL, 2 in NL), which are not factored into winning percentage or games behind (and were often replayed again) occurred throughout the season.

==== American League ====
- Boston Red Sox, 3
- Chicago White Sox, 1
- Detroit Tigers, 2
- New York Yankees, 1
- St. Louis Browns, 1
- Washington Senators, 2

==== National League ====
- Boston Braves, 1
- Chicago Cubs, 2
- New York Giants, 2
- Philadelphia Phillies, 1

== Postseason ==
The postseason began on October 4 and ended on October 10 with the Washington Senators defeating the New York Giants in the 1924 World Series in seven games.

=== Bracket ===
World Series
AL	Washington Senators	4
NL	New York Giants	3

== Managerial changes ==
=== Off-season ===
Team	Former Manager	New Manager
Boston Braves	Fred Mitchell	Dave Bancroft
Boston Red Sox	Frank Chance	Lee Fohl
Chicago White Sox	Kid Gleason	Johnny Evers
Cincinnati Reds	Pat Moran	Jack Hendricks
St. Louis Browns	Jimmy Austin	George Sisler
Washington Senators	Donie Bush	Bucky Harris

=== In-season ===
Team	Former Manager	New Manager
Chicago White Sox	Johnny Evers	Ed Walsh
Chicago White Sox	Ed Walsh	Eddie Collins
New York Giants	John McGraw	Hughie Jennings

== League leaders ==
=== American League ===
Hitting leaders
Stat	Player	Total
AVG	Babe Ruth (NYY)	.378
OPS	Babe Ruth (NYY)	1.252
HR	Babe Ruth (NYY)	46
RBI	Goose Goslin (WSH)	129
R	Babe Ruth (NYY)	143
H	Sam Rice (WSH)	216
SB	Eddie Collins (CWS)	42

^{1} American League Triple Crown pitching winner

Pitching leaders
Stat	Player	Total
W	Walter Johnson^{1} (WSH)	23
L	Howard Ehmke (BOS); Alex Ferguson (BOS); Joe Shaute (CLE)	17
ERA	Walter Johnson^{1} (WSH)	2.72
K	Walter Johnson^{1} (WSH)	158
IP	Howard Ehmke (BOS)	315.0
SV	Firpo Marberry (WSH)	15
WHIP	Walter Johnson (WSH)	1.116

=== National League ===
Hitting leaders
Stat	Player	Total
AVG	Rogers Hornsby (STL)	.424
OPS	Rogers Hornsby (STL)	1.203
HR	Jack Fournier (BRO)	27
RBI	George Kelly (NYG)	136
R	Frankie Frisch (NYG); Rogers Hornsby (STL)	121
H	Rogers Hornsby (STL)	227
SB	Max Carey (PIT)	49

^{1} National League Triple Crown pitching winner

Pitching leaders
Stat	Player	Total
W	Dazzy Vance^{1} (BRO)	28
L	Jesse Barnes (BSN)	20
ERA	Dazzy Vance^{1} (BRO)	2.16
K	Dazzy Vance^{1} (BRO)	262
IP	Burleigh Grimes (BRO)	310.2
SV	Jakie May (CIN)	6
WHIP	Dazzy Vance (BRO)	1.022

== Milestones ==
=== Batters ===
==== Cycles ====
- Baby Doll Jacobson (SLB):
  - Jacobson hit for his first cycle and third in franchise history, on April 17 against the Chicago White Sox.
- Goose Goslin (WSH):
  - Goslin hit for his first cycle and second in franchise history, on August 28 against the New York Yankees.

==== Other batting accomplishments ====
- Max Carey (PIT):
  - Recorded his 600th career stolen base in the seventh inning against the Chicago Cubs on June 27. He became the eighth player to reach this mark.
- George Kelly (NYG):
  - Set a National League record and tied a Major League record by becoming the second player to hit home runs in six consecutive games between July 11 and 16.
- Eddie Collins (CWS):
  - Recorded his 700th career stolen base in the first inning against the Detroit Tigers on September 11. He became the fifth player to reach this mark.
- Jim Bottomley (STL):
  - Set a Major League record by hitting 12 runs batted in (RBI) in a single game against the Brooklyn Robins on September 16, and the second to hit at least 10.

=== Pitchers ===
==== No-hitters ====
- Jesse Haines (STL):
  - Haines threw his first career no-hitter and the second no-hitter in franchise history, by defeating the Boston Braves 5–0 on July 17. Haines walked three and struck out five.

==== Other pitching accomplishments ====
- Grover Cleveland Alexander (CHC):
  - Became the 11th member of the 300-win club, defeating the New York Giants on September 20, winning 7–3.

== Awards and honors ==
- League Award: Dazzy Vance (BRO, National); Walter Johnson (WSH, American)

== Home field attendance ==
Team name	Wins	%±	Home attendance	%±	Per game
New York Yankees	89	−9.2%	1,053,533	4.6%	13,507
Detroit Tigers	86	3.6%	1,015,136	11.4%	13,015
New York Giants	93	−2.1%	844,068	2.8%	10,962
Brooklyn Robins	92	21.1%	818,883	45.0%	10,635
Pittsburgh Pirates	90	3.4%	736,883	20.6%	9,570
Chicago Cubs	81	−2.4%	716,922	1.9%	9,191
Chicago White Sox	66	−4.3%	606,658	5.7%	7,879
Washington Senators	92	22.7%	584,310	63.5%	7,396
St. Louis Browns	74	0.0%	533,349	23.9%	6,838
Philadelphia Athletics	71	2.9%	531,992	−0.4%	7,093
Cleveland Indians	67	−18.3%	481,905	−13.8%	6,425
Cincinnati Reds	83	−8.8%	473,707	−17.6%	6,233
Boston Red Sox	67	9.8%	448,556	95.3%	5,825
Philadelphia Phillies	55	10.0%	299,818	31.4%	3,945
St. Louis Cardinals	65	−17.7%	272,885	−19.4%	3,544
Boston Braves	53	−1.9%	177,478	−22.1%	2,335

== See also ==
- 1924 in baseball (Events, Births, Deaths)
