= 1927 in baseball =

The following are the baseball events of the year 1927 throughout the world.

== Headline Event of the Year ==
- Murderers' Row lead New York Yankees to 1927 victory.
- Babe Ruth hits 60 home runs.

== Champions ==
- World Series: New York Yankees over Pittsburgh Pirates (4–0)
- Negro World Series: Chicago American Giants over Atlantic City Bacharach Giants (5–3–1)

NNL Championship Series			World Series
			ECL	Atlantic City	3
NNL1	Chicago	4	NNL	Chicago	5
NNL2	Birmingham	1

== Awards ==
- League Award
  - Lou Gehrig, New York Yankees, 1B
  - Paul Waner, Pittsburgh Pirates, RF

== Statistical leaders ==
	American League		National League		Eastern Colored League		Negro National League	
Stat	Player	Total	Player	Total	Player	Total	Player	Total
AVG	Harry Heilmann (DET)	.398	Paul Waner (PIT)	.380	Jud Wilson (BBS/NYL)	.422	Roy Parnell (BBB)	.422
HR	Babe Ruth (NYY)	60	Cy Williams (PHI); Hack Wilson (CHC)	30	Oscar Charleston (HBG); Martín Dihigo (CSE)	13	Willie Wells (SLS)	29
RBI	Lou Gehrig (NYY)	173	Paul Waner (PIT)	131	Dick Lundy (BG)	76	Turkey Stearnes (DTS)	114
W	Waite Hoyt (NYY); Ted Lyons (CWS)	22	Charlie Root (CHC)	26	Darltie Cooper (HBG); Luther Farrell (BG)	16	Bill Foster (CAG)	21
ERA	Wilcy Moore (NYY)	2.28	Ray Kremer (PIT)	2.47	Darltie Cooper (HBG)	2.51	Bill Foster (CAG)	2.03
K	Lefty Grove (PHA)	174	Dazzy Vance (BRO)	184	Luther Farrell (BG)	138	Ted Trent (SLS)	133

== Major league baseball final standings ==
=== American League final standings ===
American League
Team	W	L	Pct.	GB	Home	Road
New York Yankees	110	44	.714	—	57‍–‍19	53‍–‍25
Philadelphia Athletics	91	63	.591	19	50‍–‍27	41‍–‍36
Washington Senators	85	69	.552	25	51‍–‍28	34‍–‍41
Detroit Tigers	82	71	.536	27½	44‍–‍32	38‍–‍39
Chicago White Sox	70	83	.458	39½	38‍–‍37	32‍–‍46
Cleveland Indians	66	87	.431	43½	35‍–‍42	31‍–‍45
St. Louis Browns	59	94	.386	50½	38‍–‍38	21‍–‍56
Boston Red Sox	51	103	.331	59	29‍–‍49	22‍–‍54

Locations of teams for the 1923–1931 American League seasons
American League

=== National League final standings ===
National League
Team	W	L	Pct.	GB	Home	Road
Pittsburgh Pirates	94	60	.610	—	48‍–‍31	46‍–‍29
St. Louis Cardinals	92	61	.601	1½	55‍–‍25	37‍–‍36
New York Giants	92	62	.597	2	49‍–‍25	43‍–‍37
Chicago Cubs	85	68	.556	8½	50‍–‍28	35‍–‍40
Cincinnati Reds	75	78	.490	18½	45‍–‍35	30‍–‍43
Brooklyn Robins	65	88	.425	28½	34‍–‍39	31‍–‍49
Boston Braves	60	94	.390	34	32‍–‍41	28‍–‍53
Philadelphia Phillies	51	103	.331	43	34‍–‍43	17‍–‍60

Locations of teams for the 1920–1931 National League seasons
National League

== Negro leagues final standings ==
All Negro leagues standings below are per MLB and Seamheads.

=== Eastern Colored League final standings ===
vs. Eastern Colored League						vs. Major Black teams			
Eastern Colored League	W	L	T	Pct.	GB	W	L	T	Pct.
Atlantic City Bacharach Giants	53	35	0	.607	—	55	35	1	.610
Harrisburg Giants	40	31	0	.552	4½	41	32	0	.562
Cuban Stars (East)	31	29	2	.517	8	32	30	2	.516
Baltimore Black Sox	35	35	2	.486	9	36	36	2	.500
Hilldale Club	37	45	0	.446	13	38	48	1	.443
New York Lincoln Giants	12	17	0	.400	11½	13	23	0	.361
Brooklyn Royal Giants	13	29	0	.324	17	13	29	0	.310

Locations of teams for the 1927 Eastern Colored League season
Eastern Colored League

=== Negro National League final standings ===
This was the third season in which a playoff was held to determine the pennant, for which the first half leader would be matched against the second half winner. Chicago won the first half while Birmingham won the second half. As such, they met for a best-of-seven Championship Series. Chicago would win the series in five games to win their fifth pennant.

vs. Negro National League						vs. Major Black teams			
Negro National League	W	L	T	Pct.	GB	W	L	T	Pct.
^{(1)} Chicago American Giants	60	31	1	.658	—	63	31	1	.668
Kansas City Monarchs	55	31	0	.640	2½	55	33	0	.625
St. Louis Stars	59	37	0	.615	3½	62	38	0	.620
Detroit Stars	52	43	0	.547	10	53	47	0	.530
^{(2)} Birmingham Black Barons	53	45	3	.540	10½	53	45	3	.540
Cuban Stars (West)	22	47	1	.321	27	22	47	1	.321
Memphis Red Sox	26	68	3	.284	35½	26	68	3	.284
Cleveland Hornets	12	37	0	.245	27	13	39	0	.250

^{(1)} First half champion ^{(2)} Second half champion

Locations of teams for the 1927 Negro National League season
Negro National League
Traveling team: Cuban Stars (West)

=== Independent teams final standings ===
The Homestead Grays were not a part of any league but were considered major-league tier.

vs. All Teams
Independent Clubs	W	L	T	Pct.	GB
Homestead Grays	8	2	0	.800	—

== Events ==
=== January ===
- January 27 – Accused of having fixed a game between the Detroit Tigers and Cleveland Indians during the 1919 season, Ty Cobb and Tris Speaker are forced to resign from their respective teams by baseball commissioner Kenesaw Mountain Landis. Cobb will be assigned to the Philadelphia Athletics by Detroit, while Speaker will sign as a free agent with the Washington Senators.
- January 31 – Tris Speaker makes his debut with the Washington Senators.

=== February ===
- February 8 – Ty Cobb joins the Philadelphia Athletics.
- February 9 – The Cincinnati Reds trade center fielder Edd Roush to the New York Giants in exchange by first baseman George Kelly.

=== April ===
- April 12 :
  - U.S. President Calvin Coolidge throws out the first ball in Washington, D.C. as the Washington Senators lost to the Boston Red Sox, 6–2.
  - Future Hall of famer Lloyd Waner makes his major league debut at left field for the Pittsburgh Pirates. His younger brother, Paul, is at right field in the Pirates' 2–1 victory over the Cincinnati Reds.
- April 15 – Babe Ruth hits a solo home run against Howard Ehmke of the Philadelphia Athletics in the first inning. It is Babe's first of the year. The New York Yankees win, 6–3.

=== May ===
- May 3 :
  - Jesse and Virgil Barnes became the first brothers in Major League Baseball history to pitch against each other. Virgil prevailed, as the New York Giants defeated Jesse and the Brooklyn Robins, 7–6.
  - The Pittsburgh Pirates scored a run in the eighth inning and two in the ninth to come from behind and defeat the St. Louis Cardinals 11–10, moving into a tie for first place in the National League.
- May 7 – Lou Gehrig christened the new right field pavilion at Chicago's Comiskey Park by parking a ninth inning grand slam, as the New York Yankees beat the Chicago White Sox 8–0.
- May 10 – In Detroit, it's Ty Cobb Day and more than 30,000 pay to see the Detroit Tigers legend in his first appearance at Navin Field in a Philadelphia Athletics uniform. With Eddie Collins on base in the first inning, Cobb drives a double into the overflow crowd to send home Collins for the first run of the game, though the Athletics would eventually beat the Tigers 6–3.
- May 11 – For the second day in a row, a baseball legend faces his former team for the first time in his career, when Rogers Hornsby leads the New York Giants to a 10–1 victory over the St. Louis Cardinals at the Polo Grounds. Hornsby hits a home run and collects five runs batted in.
- May 14 – In his first game against his former team, Philadelphia Athletics center fielder Tris Speaker is held hitless by Indians pitcher George Uhle in four at-bats.
- May 16 – At Sportsman's Park, 40-year-old Ty Cobb hits a home run in the seventh inning of the Philadelphia Athletics' 10–8 victory over the St. Louis Browns. Cobb, who as a Detroit Tiger had hit one home run in 1905 at age 18 and another in 1906 at age 19, becomes the first player in Major League history to hit a home run before his 20th birthday and after his 40th birthday.
- May 22 – The New York Yankees are in high spirits on the road as they beat the host Cleveland Indians at League Park, 7–2, with Babe Ruth hitting his 10th home run of the young season. Ruth's homer is described as a popup that goes over the fence. The Yankees, who wear Indian headdresses during the game, now lead the American League by four and a half games.
- May 30 – In the first game of a doubleheader, Chicago Cubs shortstop Jimmy Cooney turns the sixth unassisted triple play in Major League history during the fourth inning of a 5–4 loss to the Pittsburgh Pirates.
- May 31 – For the first time in Major League history, an unassisted triple play is turned on consecutive days. This time the trick was turned by Detroit Tigers first baseman Johnny Neun, for the seventh time in major league history, during a 1–0 win over the Cleveland Indians.
  - Babe Ruth homers for the fourth consecutive game in the fifth inning of the nightcap in Shibe Park. Ruth, who hits his 15th blast against Jack Quinn and his 16th off Howard Ehmke, finishes the month of May with 12 round-trippers. The Yankees lose the opener, 10–3, as the Athletics' Jimmie Foxx hits the first of his 524 major league career home run, which it comes off Yankees pitcher Urban Shocker.

=== June ===
- June 8 – Tony Lazzeri produces the first regular-season three home run game in New York Yankees history to help savage an 11-inning, 12–11 victory over the Chicago White Sox at Yankee Stadium. Lazzeri drives in five runs from his three homers, the last two with his third, which caps a five-run rally to tie the game in the ninth inning.
- June 11 – At League Park, Babe Ruth hits his 19th and 20th home runs of the season against Cleveland Indians left-hander Garland Buckeye. The Yankees win, 6–4.
- June 12 – For the second day in a row, the Brooklyn Robins defeat the Pittsburgh Pirates by a score of 11–10.
- June 16 – The Chicago Cubs defeat the visiting Philadelphia Phillies, 7–2, to complete a twelve-game winning streak to move within a game of first place in the National League.

=== July ===
- July 4 – In a doubleheader, the New York Yankees beat the visiting Washington Senators 12–1 and 21–1, prompting Senators first baseman Joe Judge to say, "Those fellows not only beat you but they tear your heart out. I wish the season was over."
- July 5 – The Boston Red Sox defeat the Philadelphia Athletics at Fenway Park, 6–5, to end a fifteen-game losing streak.
- July 9 – Detroit Tigers first baseman Johnny Neun steals five bases in a 14–4 victory over the New York Yankees at Navin Field.
- July 13 – Johnny Neun of the Detroit Tigers steals home in both games of a doubleheader with the Washington Senators at Navin Field. Detroit won both games, 7–3 and 13–9.
- July 18 – The Philadelphia Phillies used four pitchers as pinch hitters and pinch runners against the Pittsburgh Pirates. Jack Scott, Clarence Mitchell and Les Sweetland hit, while Tony Kaufmann ran for Scott.
- July 24 – Babe Ruth hits his 31st home run of the season and his first of 1927 at Comiskey Park. Ruth now has homered in every American League ballpark. The homer, off pitcher Tommy Thomas, breaks a 12-day drought for the Bambino. The Yanks win the game, 3–2.

=== August ===
- August 16 – At Comiskey Park, Babe Ruth hits a home run against Chicago White Sox pitcher Tommy Thomas. The New York Yankees win the game, 8–1. It is Ruth's 37th of the season, but he trails Lou Gehrig, who has 38.

=== September ===
- September 3 :
  - The New York Yankees are shut out for the only time all season by Lefty Grove and the Philadelphia Athletics.
  - Tied for first place, the Pittsburgh Pirates sweep a two-game series from the St. Louis Cardinals. They maintain sole possession of first place for the remainder of the season.
- September 4 – At Shibe Park in Philadelphia, Babe Ruth hits his 400th career home run and his 44th of the year. The landmark homer comes against Rube Walberg in a 12–2 Yankees win.
- September 5 – The Boston Red Sox beat the New York Yankees 12–11 in eighteen innings.
- September 6 – Babe Ruth and the Yankees come to Fenway Park for a doubleheader. In game 1, Ruth hits his 45th and 46th home runs of the year against Tony Welzer, and the Yankees win, 14–2. One of Ruth's round-trippers clears the center-field fence and is reputedly the longest ever hit at Fenway. In game 2, the Red Sox win, 5–2, despite Ruth's 47th home run, hit against Jack Russell.
- September 7 – Babe Ruth follows up on his three-homer day at Fenway Park with two more. Against Danny MacFayden, Ruth hits his 48th and later cracks number 49 against Slim Harriss. The Yankees win, 12–10, and Ruth now has 8 home runs at Fenway Park.
- September 11 – Back At Yankee Stadium, Babe Ruth continues his home run barrage. He hits number 50, this one against Milt Gaston of the Browns; the Yankees lose nonetheless, 6–2.
- September 13 – A big day for the Yankees and Babe Ruth. In a doubleheader against the Indians, Ruth hits his 51st home run against Willis Hudlin and his 52nd off Joe Shaute. The Yankees win both games by the score of 5–3 and clinch the AL pennant in their 139th game of the season. In addition, Waite Hoyt wins his 20th game.
- September 18 – At Yankee Stadium, New York sweeps the Chicago White Sox in a doubleheader, 2–1 and 5–1. In the nightcap, against pitcher Ted Lyons, Babe Ruth hits his 54th home run of the year. Besides, Lou Gehrig weighs in with his third grand slam of 1927.
- September 22 – At Yankee Stadium, Babe Ruth homers against Detroit Tigers pitcher Ken Holloway for his 56th of the season. Earl Combs hits three consecutive triples, as the Yankees win, 8–7.
- September 27 – Babe Ruth hit a grand slam against Lefty Grove of the Philadelphia Athletics. it is Ruth's 57th home run of the season. The Yankees win, 7–4.
- September 29 – Babe Ruth of the New York Yankees hits two homers to tie his own 1921 record of 59 home runs as the Yankees beat the Washington Senators, 15–4.
- September 30 – With the score tied 2–2 in the eighth inning, and a runner on third, Babe Ruth hits his 60th home run of the season off Washington Senators pitcher Tom Zachary for a Yankees 4–2 victory. Ruth's 60-HR season-record would not be broken for 34 years.

=== October ===
- October 2 – Harry Heilmann goes seven-for-nine with a walk in a double header on the final day of the season, as he won his fourth American League batting championship – and led both leagues – with a .398 average. One more hit during the season would have raised his average to .400 for the second time in his career, as Heilmann had hit .403 in 1923.
- October 5 – Two errors by the Pittsburgh Pirates lead to three unearned runs as the New York Yankees take game one of the 1927 World Series, 5–4.
- October 6 – Once again, sloppy play by the Pittsburgh Pirates helps the Yankees cruise to a game two victory as they score runs on an error, wild pitch and hit batsman.
- October 7 – A three-run home run by Babe Ruth caps off a six-run seventh inning as the Yankees cruise to an 8–1 victory in game three of the World Series.
- October 8 – The New York Yankees defeat the Pittsburgh Pirates, 4–3, in Game 4 of the World Series, to win their second World Championship, four games to none. This was the first sweep by an American League team over the rival National League. Babe Ruth's fifth-inning home run gives the Yankees a 3–1 lead, but Pittsburgh ties the game later. In the top of the ninth inning, Earle Combs walks, Mark Koenig hits a bunt single, and Ruth walks to fill the bases. Two outs later, a wild pitch rolls far enough away for Combs to score the winning run.

=== November ===
- November 28 – Billy Evans quits as American League umpire to become business manager of the Cleveland Indians, following the purchase of the club by a group headed by Alva Bradley, to become the first general manager in major league history. Evans, who worked as an AL umpire from 1906 to 1927, became, at age 22, the youngest umpire in major league history, and later became the youngest to officiate in the World Series at age 25.

=== December ===
- December 2 – The Detroit Tigers send outfielder Heinie Manush along with first baseman Lu Blue to the St. Louis Browns in exchange for shortstop Chick Galloway, outfielder Harry Rice and pitcher Elam Vangilder. Manush, who batted .298 for Detroit in the regular season, will explode in 1928 with the Browns, batting .378 with 104 runs, 90 extra bases, 108 RBI, and a league-leading 241 hits.

== Births ==
=== January ===
- January 1 – Marion Hosbein
- January 1 – Carl Scheib
- January 3 – Chris Van Cuyk
- January 8 – Jim Busby
- January 16 – Maybelle Blair
- January 21 – Danny O'Connell
- January 26 – Bob Nieman
- January 28 – Carlos Bernier
- January 28 – Margaret Holgerson

=== February ===
- February 2 – Doris Sams
- February 2 – Fred Waters
- February 6 – Smoky Burgess
- February 7 – Joe Lonnett
- February 7 – Al Richter
- February 13 – Jim Brideweser
- February 15 – Buddy Hicks
- February 18 – Luis Arroyo
- February 18 – Herm Wehmeier

=== March ===
- March 9 – Jackie Jensen
- March 16 – Clint Courtney
- March 19 – Richie Ashburn
- March 20 – Earlene Risinger
- March 20 – Jim Willis
- March 21 – Bernie Creger
- March 21 – Owen Friend
- March 22 – Paul Stuffel
- March 23 – Johnny Logan
- March 27 – Dick Rozek

=== April ===
- April 2 – Billy Pierce
- April 3 – Janet Jamieson
- April 4 – Don Hasenmayer
- April 6 – Jim Romano
- April 8 – Charlie Maxwell
- April 11 – Jack Faszholz
- April 14 – Don Mueller
- April 24 – Frank Lucchesi
- April 26 – Granny Hamner
- April 26 – Bob Zick

=== May ===
- May 1 – Betty Luna
- May 4 – Hal Hudson
- May 9 – Ray Katt
- May 9 – Audrey Haine
- May 13 – Dusty Rhodes
- May 17 – Jim McDonald
- May 18 – Esther Lyman
- May 19 – Bill Antonello
- May 21 – El Tappe
- May 24 – Milt Jordan
- May 26 – Dutch Romberger
- May 26 – Elizabeth Wicken

=== June ===
- June 15 – Ben Flowers
- June 18 – Irv Medlinger
- June 21 – Jackie Collum
- June 28 – Dick Lane
- June 28 – Ellen Tronnier

=== July ===
- July 7 – Hal Keller
- July 7 – Sammy White
- July 10 – Paul Pryor
- July 12 – Jack Harshman
- July 13 – Rubén Gómez
- July 19 – Billy Gardner
- July 21 – Dick Smith
- July 23 – Virgil Jester
- July 24 – Preston Ward
- July 26 – Bill Miller
- July 30 – Virginia Bell
- July 31 – Al Aber
- July 31 – Billy Shantz

=== August ===
- August 3 – Dick Welteroth
- August 5 – Rocky Krsnich
- August 7 – Rocky Bridges
- August 7 – Art Houtteman
- August 8 – Johnny Temple
- August 10 – Bob Chakales
- August 12 – Charlie White
- August 18 – Roger Bowman
- August 25 – Jim Suchecki
- August 30 – Gordon Goldsberry

=== September ===
- September 1 – Cloyd Boyer
- September 1 – Tom Burgess
- September 1 – Bob DiPietro
- September 2 – Milo Hamilton
- September 10 – Brandy Davis
- September 13 – Jenny Romatowski
- September 14 – Jim Fanning
- September 14 – Dave Hillman
- September 15 – Duke Simpson
- September 19 – Bill Sarni
- September 21 – Jim Clark
- September 22 – Tommy Lasorda
- September 26 – Kathryn Vonderau
- September 27 – Genevieve George
- September 27 – Tom Kirk
- September 30 – Ben Taylor

=== October ===
- October 3 – Bill Harrington
- October 4 – Bob Kelly
- October 5 – Al Heist
- October 6 – Bethany Goldsmith
- October 12 – Mary Butcher
- October 12 – Doc Daugherty
- October 12 – Peggy Fenton
- October 15 – Bill Henry
- October 17 – Johnny Klippstein
- October 18 – Marv Rotblatt
- October 24 – Jim Greengrass
- October 24 – Cal Hogue
- October 20 – Emilio Cueche
- October 30 – Joe Adcock

=== November ===
- November 1 – Vic Power
- November 2 – Davey Williams
- November 3 – Fred Richards
- November 4 – Carl Sawatski
- November 5 – Putsy Caballero
- November 7 – Hiroshi Yamauchi
- November 12 – Harry Hanebrink
- November 17 – Dick Weik
- November 21 – Norene Arnold
- November 26 – Pete Taylor
- November 27 – Frank Quinn
- November 28 – Carlos Paula
- November 29 – Vin Scully

=== December ===
- December 6 – Tommy Brown
- December 7 – Dick Donovan
- December 11 – Johnny Gray
- December 21 – Jack Daniels
- December 23 – Tony Roig
- December 25 – Nellie Fox
- December 26 – Stu Miller
- December 26 – Danny Schell
- December 27 – Audrey Wagner

== Deaths ==
=== January ===
- January 3 – Ham Avery, 72, who at age 20 and 21 umpired in nine games in the first professional league, the National Association of Professional Base Ball Players in 1874 and 1875, and later became a successful Cincinnati lawyer.
- January 13 – Bob Ingersoll, 44, pitcher for the 1914 Cincinnati Reds.
- January 27 – Drummond Brown, 41, pitcher from 1912 to 1914 for the National League Boston Braves and the Kansas City Packers of the Federal League.

=== February ===
- February 11 – Bobby Rothermel, 56, infielder who played with the 1899 Baltimore Orioles.
- February 13 – Vive Lindaman, 49, pitcher for the Boston Doves/Beaneaters of the National League from 1906 to 1909.
- February 17 – Harry Little, 76, outfielder/second baseman for the St. Louis Brown Stockings and Louisville Grays of the National League during the 1877 season.
- February 19 – Katsy Keifer, 35, pitcher for the 1914 Indianapolis Hoosiers of the Federal League.
- February 21 – Ike Rockenfield, 50, second baseman for the St. Louis Browns of the American League in the 1905 and 1906 seasons.
- February 24 – Charlie Bennett, 72, star catcher whose career was ended when a train accident cost him his legs.

=== March ===
- March 4 – Horace Wilson, 84, American professor of English at Tokyo University during the modernization of Japan after the Meiji Restoration, who is credited with introducing baseball to Japan in either 1872 or 1873.
- March 6 – John Tilley, 72, left fielder for the Cleveland Blues, Toledo BlueStockings and St. Paul WhiteCaps in parts of two seasons spanning 1882–1884.
- March 16 – Jake Wells, 63, catcher and left fielder for the 1888 Detroit Wolverines and the 1890 St. Louis Browns.
- March 27 – Joe Start, 84, prominent first baseman of the 1860s and 1870s.

=== April ===
- April 1 – Ben Harris, 37, pitcher for the Kansas City Packers of the Federal League from 1914 to 1915.
- April 2 – Mike Lynch, 46, pitcher for the Pittsburgh PIrates and New York Giants from 1904 through 1907.
- April 7 – Billy Alvord, 63, third baseman for five seasons from 1885 to 1893.
- April 7 – Ray Miller, 39, pitcher for the Cleveland Indians and the Pittsburgh Pirates in 1917.
- April 13 – Kirtley Baker, 57, National League pitcher for the Pittsburgh Alleghenys, Baltimore Orioles and Washington Senators in parts of five seasons spanning 1890–1899.
- April 13 – Tommy Johns, 75, left fielder for the Baltimore Marylands of the National Association during the 1873 season.
- April 18 – Pop Smith, 70, infielder for 12 seasons from 1880 to 1891.
- April 26 – Bill Gannon, 54, outfielder for the Chicago Orphans of the National League in 1901.

=== May ===
- May 3 – Otto Schomberg, 62, first baseman and right fielder for the 1886 Pittsburgh Alleghenys of the American Association and the 1887–1888 Indianapolis Hoosiers of the National League.
- May 16 – Pat Murphy, 70, backup catcher who played from 1887 through 1890 for the New York Giants of the National League.
- May 18 – Patrick O'Loughlin, 67, Irish outfielder who appeared in one game for the 1883 Baltimore Orioles of the American Association.
- May 26 – Herm Merritt, 26, shortstop for the 1921 Detroit Tigers of the American League.

=== June ===
- June 7 – Pat Griffin, 34, pitcher for the 1914 Cincinnati Reds of the National League.
- June 13 – Jim Johnstone, 54, Irish-born umpire who worked 1,736 games in American League (1902), National League (1903–1912) and "outlaw" Federal league (1915), and the 1906 and 1909 World Series; inventor of the face mask used by home-plate umpires for much of the 20th century.
- June 18 – Jack Harper, 33, pitcher for the 1915 Philadelphia Athletics.

=== August ===
- August 6 – Chick Pedroes, 57, Cuban outfielder in two games for the 1902 Chicago Cubs of the National League.
- August 8 – Billy Gilbert, 51, second baseman for four different teams from 1901 through 1909, and member of the 1905 New York Giants World Champion team.
- August 16 – Jerry Denny, 68, third baseman for seven National League teams in 13 seasons spanning 1881–94.
- August 22 – Mike Shea, 60, pitcher in two games for the 1887 Cincinnati Red Stockings of the American Association.
- August 25 – Harry Cheek, 48, backup catcher for the 1910 Philadelphia Phillies of the National League.

=== September ===
- September 6 – Lave Cross, 61, third baseman and catcher for over 20 seasons, captain of the 1902 and 1905 AL champion Philadelphia Athletics, and one of the first ten players to collect 2,500 hits.
- September 27 – Ben Hunt, 38, pitched for the Red Sox and Cardinals in the early 1910s.
- September 30 – Hank Morrison, 61, pitcher for the 1887 Indianapolis Hoosiers of the National League.

=== October ===
- October 4 – John Richter, 54, third baseman for the 1898 Louisville Colonels of the National League.
- October 11 – Mike Corcoran, 69, pitcher in one game for the 1884 Chicago White Stockings of the National League.
- October 14 – Ed Hughes, 47, pitcher for the Boston Americans of the American League in the 1905 and 1906 seasons.
- October 22 – Ross Youngs, 30, Hall of Fame right fielder who hit a career .322 batting average for the New York Giants over 10 seasons from 1917 to 1926, which included four National League pennants and two World Series championships in 1921 and 1922.
- October 25 – Tom Brown, 67, outfielder who played from 1892 through 1898 for nine teams in four different leagues, collecting 1951 hits in 1788 games, while managing two seasons for the 1897–1898 Washington Senators, and umpiring three full seasons.

=== November ===
- November 7 – Ed Clark, 64, pitcher for the 1886 Philadelphia Athletics of the American Association,
- November 8 – Phil Bedgood, 29, pitcher from 1922 to 1923 for the Cleveland Indians of the American League.
- November 22 – John McGlone, 66, third baseman for the 1886 Washington Senators of the National League and the 1887–1888 Cleveland Blues of the American Association.
- November 30 – Jimmy Wood, 84, player/manager for the Chicago White Stockings, Troy Haymakers, Brooklyn Eckfords and Philadelphia White Stockings from 1871 to 1873, who hit .333 in 102 games and posted a 105–99 managerial record.

=== December ===
- December 1 – Danny Shay, 51, shortstop for the Cleveland Blues, St. Louis Cardinals and New York Giants in parts of four seasons spanning 1901–07.
- December 1 – Germany Smith, 64, shortstop who played from 1884 through 1898 for seven different teams, most notably for the Brooklyn Grays/Bridegrooms during seven seasons.
- December 17 – Bill Gilbert, 59, pitcher for the 1892 Baltimore Orioles of the National League.
- December 24 – Al Myers, 64, second baseman who played from 1894 to 1891 for five teams, most prominently with the Washington Nationals of the National League.
- December 31 – Jack Sharrott, 58, pitcher/outfielder who posted a 20–17 record with a 3.12 ERA and a .237 batting average for the New York Giants and Philadelphia Phillies from 1890 to 1893.
