= List of people from South Bend, Indiana =

The people listed below were born in, residents of, or otherwise closely associated with the city of South Bend, Indiana. Alumni of local universities, including athletes and coaches, who are not originally from South Bend should not be included in this list; instead, they should be listed in the alumni list article for each university.

== Government and politics ==
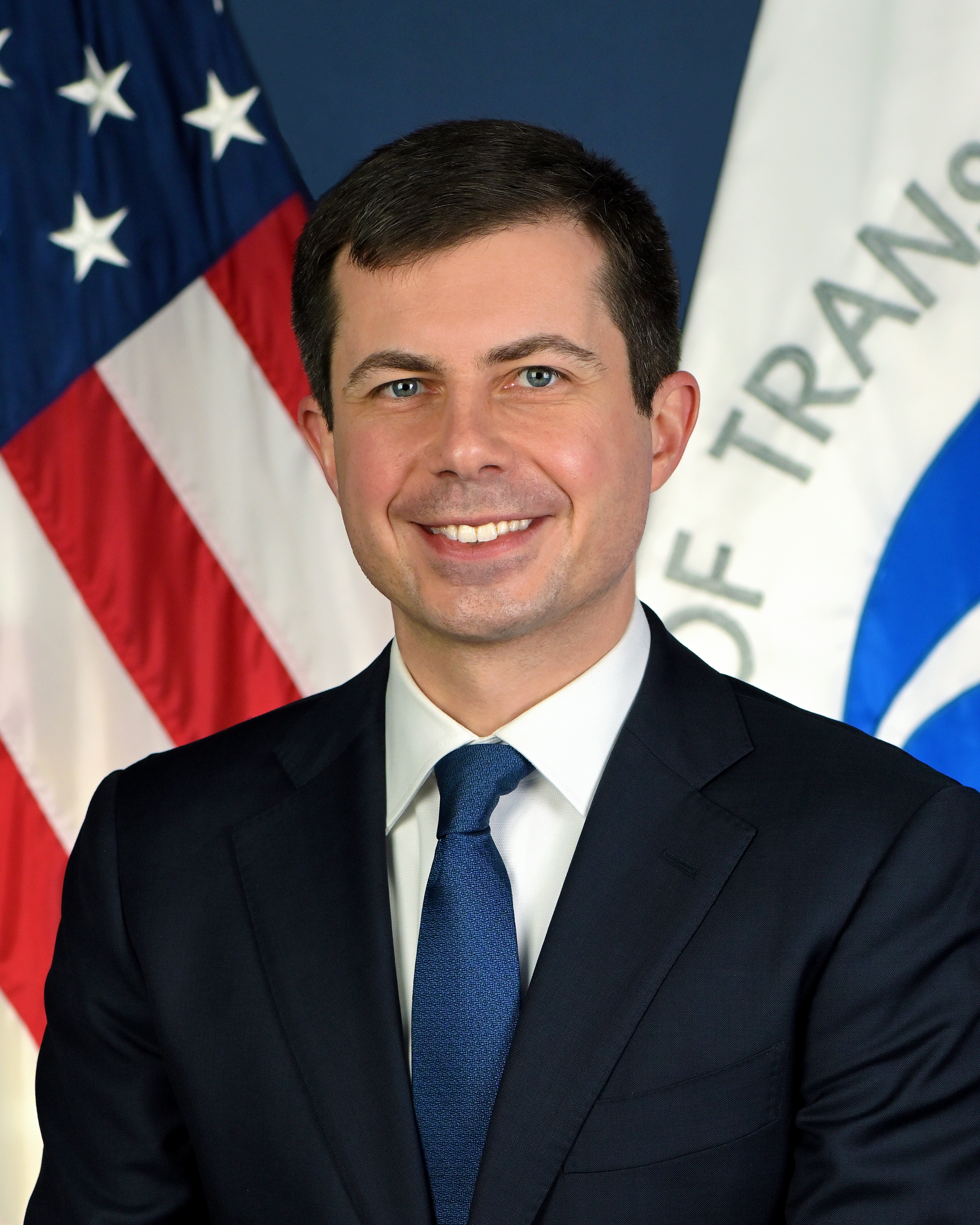
Pete Buttigieg

- John Brademas, former House majority whip
- Pete Buttigieg, United States secretary of transportation (2021–2025), mayor of South Bend (2012–2020) and candidate in the 2020 Democratic Party presidential primaries
- Schuyler Colfax, 17th vice president of the United States
- Alexis Coquillard, founder of South Bend
- Tom Emmer, U.S. representative for Minnesota
- Noma Gurich, chief justice of the Supreme Court of Oklahoma
- Timothy Howard, 43rd Indiana Supreme Court chief justice, Indiana state senator
- Joe Kernan, politician and governor of Indiana (2003–2005)
- Clarence Long, U.S. congressman of Maryland
- Larry J. McKinney, United States District Court judge
- James Mueller, mayor of South Bend since 2020
- Tim Roemer, former U.S. ambassador to India and U.S. congressman
- William F. Roemer Jr., FBI agent who investigated organized crime.
- Jake Teshka, member of the Indiana House of Representatives
- Rudy Yakym, U.S. representative for Indiana

== Film and television ==
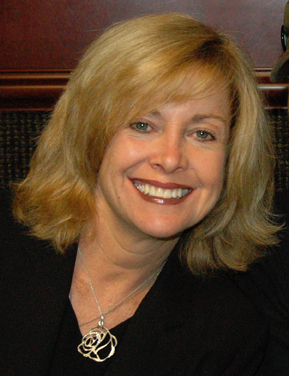
Catherine Hicks

- John Bromfield, actor
- Charles Butterworth, actor
- John Clarke, actor
- Dick Durock, stuntman and actor
- Chad Everett, actor
- Ashley Flowers, podcaster
- Vivica A. Fox, actress
- Dolores Fuller, actress and Ed Wood's muse
- Lloyd Haynes, actor
- Catherine Hicks, actress; attended Saint Mary's College
- Larry Karaszewski, film and TV screenwriter and producer
- Jeremy Leven, writer, director
- Keith Alan Morris, filmmaker
- Dean Norris, actor
- Sydney Pollack, film director and actor
- Nancy Priddy, actress and singer
- Dan Resin, actor
- George Seaton, film director
- Ansel Wallace, newsreel cameraman and photographer in World War I
- Pamela Gaye Walker, actress, writer, director
- Michael Warren, actor
- Daniel Waters, film director and screenwriter
- Mark Waters, film director and producer
- Isiah Whitlock Jr., actor
- Chuck Zink, television personality

== Sports ==
=== American football ===
- Anthony Barr, NFL linebacker playing for the Dallas Cowboys
- Frank Bykowski, NFL player
- Bill Doba, football coach
- Kent Gaydos, football player
- Jon Gruden, former ESPN broadcaster and NFL coach
- Anthony Johnson, NFL running back
- MyCole Pruitt, NFL tight end for the Atlanta Falcons
- Ernie Zalejski, American football player
- Danny Pinter, NFL Offensive Lineman for the Baltimore Ravens

=== Baseball ===
- Ollie Bejma, baseball player
- Craig Counsell, baseball player
- Nancy DeShone, All-American Girls Professional Baseball League (AAGPBL) player for the South Bend Blue Sox
- Dorothea Downs, AAGPBL player, South Bend Blue Sox
- Mary Lou Graham, AAGPBL player, South Bend Blue Sox
- Frances Janssen, AAGPBL player and Northern Indiana Historical Society researcher
- Glenna Sue Kidd, AAGPBL player, South Bend Blue Sox
- Marie Kruckel, AAGPBL player for the South Bend Blue Sox and a 38-year teacher at Clay High School
- Andy Replogle, baseball pitcher
- Betty Wagoner, AAGPBL player, South Bend Blue Sox
- Janet Wiley, AAGPBL player for the South Bend Blue Sox

=== Basketball ===
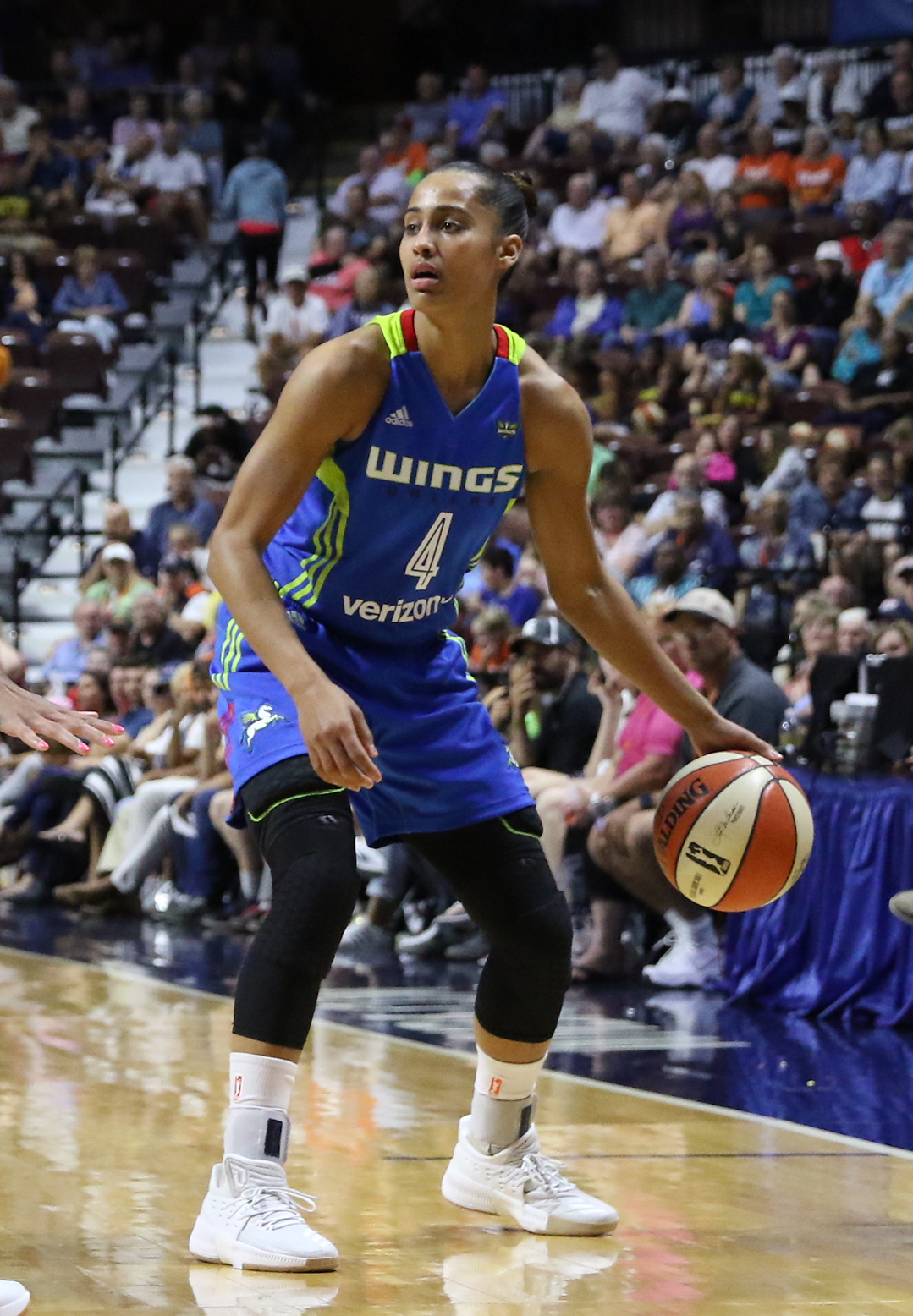
- Skylar Diggins
  Tom Abernethy, basketball player
- Skylar Diggins, WNBA, professional basketball player
- Jaden Ivey, NBA player for the Detroit Pistons
- Demetrius Jackson, professional basketball player
- John Laskowski, basketball player
- Lee Nailon, NBA basketball player and 2007 Israeli Basketball Premier League MVP
- Javon Small, NBA player for the Memphis Grizzlies
- Jasmine Watson, basketball player
- Blake Wesley, basketball player
- John Wooden, basketball coach

=== Motorsports ===
- Luther Johnson, Indy car driver
- Mike LaRocco, motocross racer
- J. C. McDonald, Indy car driver
- Ryan Newman, NASCAR Cup Series driver
- Mike Salay, Indy car driver
- David Stremme, NASCAR driver

=== Miscellaneous ===
- Anne Doyle, sportscaster
- Mark Hazinski, 2004 USA Olympian in table tennis
- Steve Nemeth, player of gridiron football

== Music ==
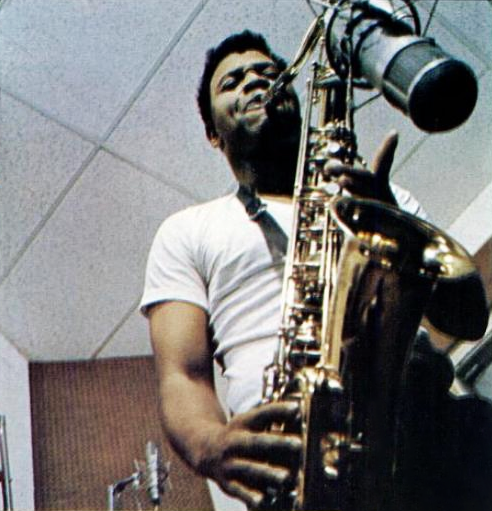
Junior Walker

- Brendan Bayliss and Jake Cinninger, guitarists, Umphrey's McGee (a progressive rock and jam band from South Bend)
- Beatrice Carmichael, opera singer and director
- Tom "Big Daddy" Donahue, pioneering rock and roll radio disc jockey, record producer and concert promoter
- Marcie Free, singer, King Kobra, Unruly Child, Signal
- Josh Garrels, musician
- Nathan Gunn, opera singer and professor
- Traci Paige Johnson, co-creator, Blue's Clues TV show
- Kennedy's Kitchen, traditional Irish band
- Sneaky Pete Kleinow, musician
- Ted Leo, musician
- Merchant Ships, late aughts emo band
- The Rivieras, 1960s garage rock and surf rock band
- Jules C. Stein, music industry executive
- Student Rick, early 2000s pop punk and emo band
- Alexander Toradze, pianist
- Junior Walker, 1960s soul singer and saxophonist signed to Motown (with the All Stars)
- Vivian Weeks, musician, known by her stage name, "STOMACH BOOK"

== Literature ==
- Elijah Anderson, sociologist and author of Code of the Street
- Tess Gunty, author, winner of the National Book Award
- Phillip Hoose, author
- Kenn Kaufman, naturalist and author
- Bernard Kilgore, journalist, Wall Street Journal
- Dylan Krieger, poet
- Kenneth Rexroth, poet, translator of the classical Chinese poets, essayist, intellectual, anarchist.

== Business ==
=== Heavy industries ===
- John Birdsell, inventor of the Birdsell Clover Huller and founder of Birdsell Manufacturing Company
- James Oliver, inventor and industrialist best known for creating South Bend Iron Works, which was reincorporated as Oliver Farm Equipment Company after his death
- Studebaker Brothers, founders of Studebaker Corporation

=== Miscellaneous ===
- Narsai David, San Francisco chef and restaurateur
- Cashmere Nicole, entrepreneur
- Conrad Prebys, property developer, philanthropist, billionaire

== Military ==
- Alexander Louis Arch, World War I Army veteran who fired the first American artillery shell in the Meuse-Argonne offensive
- Jeremy Michael Boorda, Navy admiral
- Howard G. Bunker, Air Force general
- Edward Hale Campbell, Navy admiral
- James H. Kasler, Korean War and Vietnam War fighter pilot and POW; only recipient of three Air Force Crosses
- Joseph A. Nolan, Medal of Honor Recipient, Philippine insurrection

== Science ==
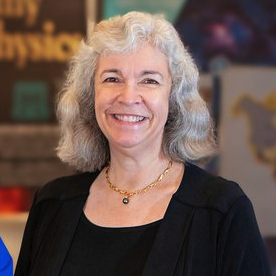
Debra Elmegreen

- Debra Elmegreen, astronomer
- Robert Fassnacht, researcher killed in bombing
- Marcus Ward Lyon Jr., mammalogist, pathologist
- Maclyn McCarty, physician and biochemistry researcher who helped identify DNA as the genetic material, ushering in the era of molecular biology
- Eric F. Wieschaus, evolutionary developmental biologist. Nobel Prize in Medicine

== Art ==
- George Rickey, kinetic sculptor

=== Education ===
- Ivan Meštrović, sculptor, professor at the University of Notre Dame, died in South Bend

== Others ==
- Michael Alig, co-founder of the Club Kids and convicted murderer
- Paul Smith, first African-American minister at historic First Presbyterian Church of Brooklyn, New York; multicultural consultant, civil rights activist, university administrator, teacher, author
- Emerson Spartz, media mogul
- William Albert Wack, CSC, bishop of Diocese of Pensacola–Tallahassee
