= Audrey Bleiler =

American baseball player

- Third base / Shortstop
- Born: January 12, 1933; Philadelphia, Pennsylvania, U.S.
- Died: June 28, 1975 (aged 42); Camden, New Jersey, U.S.
- Batted: Right Threw: Right

Teams
- South Bend Blue Sox (1950–1952)

Career highlights and awards
- Two championship teams (1951–1952); Women in Baseball – AAGPBL Permanent Display at Baseball Hall of Fame and Museum (1988)

Audrey Bleiler [Seitzinger] (January 12, 1933 – June 20, 1975) was an infielder who played from 1950 through 1952 in the All-American Girls Professional Baseball League. Listed at 5 ft 7 in (1.70 m), 125 lb., Bleiler batted and threw right-handed. She was born in Philadelphia, Pennsylvania.

The opposing pitchers were not worried about facing the diminutive Audrey Bleiler, but she would compensate for that with her quickness and instinctive reflexes at the hot corner for most of her three seasons in the league, winning consecutive championships with the South Bend Blue Sox.

Bleiler joined South Bend in the 1950 season, serving primarily as a backup at third base for Helen Filarski and eventually filling in at shortstop for Senaida Wirth. Bleiler was part of a rare occurrence in her rookie season while playing a game against the Muskegon Lassies. With runners at second and third bases and none outs, she caught a line drive ball and threw to second sacker Mary Baker, who nailed the base runner. Baker then whipped the ball to Bleiler, who tagged the runner before she could return to third to complete a 5-4-5 triple play.

Her most productive season was in 1951, when she posted a slash line (BA/OBP/SLG) of .202/.291/.256 to help the Blue Sox win their first pennant and championship title.

After being married in 1951, she played under the name of Audrey Seitzinger during the 1952 season, her last year in the league. South Bend swept the Grand Rapids Chicks in the best-of-three first round, and won their second title in a row after defeating the Rockford Peaches, 3 to 2 games. She was a .180 career hitter and batted .286 (6-for-21) in seven postseason games.

She left the Blue Sox after the season and stayed home to take care of her family. She went on to have two boys, Thomas and Charles, and two girls, Audrey and Marie.

Audrey Bleiler Seitzinger died in 1975 in Camden, New Jersey, at the early age of 42. Thirteen years after her death, she was recognized at Women in Baseball, a permanent display based at the Baseball Hall of Fame and Museum in Cooperstown, New York, which was unveiled to honor the entire All-American Girls Professional Baseball League.

== Career statistics ==
Batting

GP	AB	R	H	2B	3B	HR	RBI	SB	TB	BB	SO	BA	OBP	SLG
103	261	31	47	4	3	0	30	9	57	33	42	.180	.272	.218

Fielding

GP	PO	A	E	TC	DP	FA
99	94	213	32	339	7	.906
