= Filarski =

Filarski is a surname. Notable people with the surname include:

- Elisabeth Hasselbeck (born 1977), formerly Elisabeth Filarski, American TV personality
- Helen Filarski (1924–2014), American baseball player
