= Doris Jones =

Doris Jones may refer to:

- Doris Jones (politician) (fl. 1960s–1970s), Ohio state politician
- Doris Jones (archer) (born 1988), Canadian archer
- Doris Jones (baseball) (born 1924), member of the All-American Girls Professional Baseball League
- Doris W. Jones (1913–2006), founded the Jones-Haywood School of Ballet
- Doris Egerton Jones (1889–1973), Australian writer of novels and plays
