= Amy Shuman =

American baseball player

- First base
- Born: March 10, 1925; Mohrsville, Pennsylvania, U.S.
- Died: August 22, 2014 (aged 89); Wyomissing, Pennsylvania, U.S.
- Batted: Left Threw: Left

Teams
- Grand Rapids Chicks (1946); South Bend Blue Sox (1946)

Amy Shuman/Jurasinski [nee Dunkleberger] (March 10, 1925 – August 22, 2014) was an American baseball player. Amy played in the All-American Girls Professional Baseball League (AAGPBL) during the 1946 season. She measured 5-foot 6-inch and weighed 140 pounds, and batted and threw left-handed.

== Early love for ball ==
Amy was born in Mohrsville, Pennsylvania, to parents Earl and Pearl (Gerber) Dunkleberger. From age 8, Amy played baseball everyday on her family's farm, with Dorothy, Elaine and Charles, her older siblings. In later years, her younger siblings – Doris and Gladys – also joined in. All the kids were encouraged to play and develop their baseball skills by their father who would play with them when he could. Her mother on the other hand, “would get mad when [they] played all day and not do the chores she wanted us to do,” Nonetheless, every kid from the neighborhood would come most days to the field to play too.

After graduating Ontelaunee High School in 1942, Amy worked for the Reading Company and continued to excel on the softball diamond. In 1943 she and her sisters rejoined the Mohrsville Dodgers. A little while later, the girls played for the Diamond Lil's, a team that did pretty well in Pennsylvania but not so good in state tournaments against the Kaufmann Maids. Amy was named ‘Rookie of the Year,’ when she was just in ninth grade. Coach Clemens described the girls as “tireless performers,” and they truly were the team's backbone. Amy played in outfield and first base; Elaine in center field; Gladys was a catcher, and Doris a pitcher.

== Professional baseball ==
Amy only played professional baseball for a short while. While playing for the Mohrsville Dodgers in Lancaster, she was spotted by an AAGPBL scout. In 1946, she played for the Grand Rapids Chicks and the South Bend Blue Sox in the position of first base. Her career was cut short just a few months later however, as her husband – Mark Shuman accompanied by his mother – went to visit her in Indiana to try to convince her to come back home with them to Mohrsville. She was torn by that visit and a telegram from a father urging her to “stick to [her] guns.” So for a week she followed his advice, telling her husband and his mother that she was going to complete the last six weeks of the season.

While playing in the AAGPBL, Amy made $65 a week but was disappointed that she did not get to play so much in the exhibitions as she was a rookie. Nonetheless, she got to play catch a lot with South Bend's manager Chet Grant.

== Post-baseball ==
After she returned home she missed her professional baseball league days, but, more upsetting was that she had to "look for a job." In 1947 she started work for the Berkshire Knitting Mills, as a seamstress. Still, she was able to participate in various AAGPBL events as well as the Baseball Hall of Fame's "Women in Baseball" exhibit in 1988. Her husband was killed in 1951 in an automobile accident and in 1953, Amy married Joseph Jurasinski with whom she had two daughters. She stayed at home with them from 1959 to 1964, at which time she found work with AT&T in the production line. She stayed there for 23 years until her retirement in 1987. In 1998, Joseph died. In 2006, on Mother's Day, Amy went to an unveiling of a statue of a female ballplayer at Cooperstown.

She died on August 22, 2014, in Wyomissing, Pennsylvania, at the age of 89.
