= Alice Meyer =

Alice Meyer may refer to:

- Alice Meyer (baseball) (fl. 1940s), American baseball player
- Alice Virginia Meyer (1921–2017), American educator and member of the Connecticut House of Representatives
