= Barbara Hoffman =

- Third base / Second base
- Born: January 18, 1931 (age 95); Belleville, Illinois, U.S.
- Bats: Right Throws: Right

Teams
- South Bend Blue Sox (1951–1952)

Career highlights and awards
- All-Star Team (1952); Championship team (1951); Women in Baseball – AAGPBL Permanent Display at the Baseball Hall of Fame and Museum (unveiled in 1988)

Barbara Hoffman (born January 18, 1931) is a former infielder who played from 1951 through 1952 in the All-American Girls Professional Baseball League (AAGPBL). Listed at 5' 6" [1.68 m], 133 lb. [60 k], she batted and threw right-handed.

== Biography ==
Born in Belleville, Illinois, Hoffman began playing softball at age nine and advanced to organized softball leagues in St. Louis, where she was spotted by an AAGPBL scout who offered her a contract to play for the 1951 season. Hoffman joined the South Bend Blue Sox and was inserted at third base. She hurt a knee, however, and was temporarily switched to second base because the pivot was easier to catch. She hit .212 with 20 runs and 11 RBI in just 46 games, helping the Blue Sox win their first championship title in the league.

In 1952, Hoffman was selected to the All Star Team and belted a home run in the contest, which she considered her greatest individual thrill. Just before the regular season ended, South Bend manager Karl Winsch suspended Charlene Pryer for not going in to pinch-run quickly when asked, which created an uproar after the game. That night at the team's hotel, several Blue Sox veterans talked the situation over. Then five players, including Hoffman, Elizabeth Mahon and Jane Stoll, quit the team in support of Pryer. I guess it was wrong for us to do it. We stood up for our principles, Hoffman reflected. She never returned to the league.

Following her baseball career, Hoffman played three years with the South Bend Hoosierettes, a women's basketball team, and bowled for 25 years, but never professionally. She also took a job at Bendix Corporation, where she worked for thirty-three years until her retirement in 1985. After that, she dedicated to selling baseball cards and antiques. Hoffman is part of Women in Baseball, a permanent display at the Baseball Hall of Fame and Museum at Cooperstown, New York, which was unveiled in 1988 to honor the entire All-American Girls Professional Baseball League rather than individual baseball personalities.

== Career statistics ==
Batting

GP	AB	R	H	2B	3B	HR	RBI	SB	BB	SO	BA	OBP	SLG
95	271	31	52	5	4	1	22	12	45	50	.192	.307	.251

Collective fielding

GP	PO	A	E	TC	DP	FA
86	86	166	35	287	10	.878
