= Joan Matuzewski =

American baseball player

- Outfield
- Born: October 6, 1932
- Died: August 4, 2004 (aged 71); Farwell, Michigan, U.S.
- Batted: Right Threw: Right

Teams
- South Bend Blue Sox (1953)

Joanna Marie Matuzewski (October 6, 1932 – August 4, 2004) was an All-American Girls Professional Baseball League player. She batted and threw right handed.

Born in Milwaukee, Wisconsin, Matuzewski joined the All American League in its 1953 season. She was assigned as a fourth outfielder for the South Bend Blue Sox.

'Joan', as her teammates called her, posted a batting average of .162 (16-for-162) with 15 runs scored and two RBI in 28 games, including two doubles, one triple and three stolen bases.

At outfield, she managed 32 putouts with an assist and committed five errors in 38 chances for a .868 fielding average.

In 1988 was inaugurated a permanent display at the Baseball Hall of Fame and Museum at Cooperstown, New York, that honors those who were part of the All-American Girls Professional Baseball League. Joan Matuzewski, along with the rest of the girls and the league staff, is included at the display/exhibit.

She died in 2004 in Farwell, Michigan, at the age of 71.
