= Idona Crigler =

American baseball player

- Third base / Pinch hitter
- Born: June 7, 1922; Denver, Colorado, U.S.
- Died: July 19, 1994 (aged 72); Long Beach, California, U.S.
- Batted: Right Threw: Right

Teams
- South Bend Blue Sox (1947)

Career highlights and awards
- Women in Baseball – AAGPBL Permanent Display at Baseball Hall of Fame and Museum (since 1988)

Idona Janet Crigler [Harris] (June 7, 1922 – July 19, 1994) was an All-American Girls Professional Baseball League player. Crigler batted and threw right handed. She was dubbed Dodie.

Born in Denver, Colorado, Crigler entered the league with the South Bend Blue Sox in its 1947 season. She was acquired in a transaction with the Chicago Bluebirds of the National Girls Baseball and appeared in 20 games for the Sox, five of them at third base.

Crigler posted a batting average of .138 (9-for-65) and scored two runs. As a fielder, she hauled in 41 putouts with 47 assists and turned three double plays, while committing 11 errors in 99 total chances for a .924 fielding average.

Since 1988, Crigler is part of the AAGPBL permanent display at the Baseball Hall of Fame and Museum at Cooperstown, New York, which is dedicated to the entire league rather than any individual figure.

Dodie Crigler was a long time resident of Long Beach, California, where she died in 1994 at the age of 72.

== Career statistics ==
Batting

GP	AB	R	H	2B	3B	HR	RBI	SB	BB	SO	BA
20	65	2	9	0	0	0	0	0	5	7	.138
