= Betty Rusynyk =

American baseball player

Betty McFadden
- Pitcher
- Born: October 22, 1924; Savanna, Illinois, U.S.
- Died: April 7, 2013 (aged 88); Parma, Ohio, U.S.
- Batted: Right Threw: Right

Teams
- South Bend Blue Sox (1943)

Career highlights and awards
- Women in Baseball – AAGPBL Permanent Display at the Baseball Hall of Fame and Museum (since 1988)

Betty Jean McFadden [Rusynyk] (October 22, 1924 – April 7, 2013) was an All-American Girls Professional Baseball League pitcher who played for the South Bend Blue Sox in 1943. Born in Savanna, Illinois, McFadden was nicknamed "Mac". She both batted and threw right-handed. She later spent eight seasons with the Savanna, Illinois All-Star team and five years with the Lakewood, Ohio Rangers team.

== Baseball years ==
Betty Jean only played a few games with the South Bend Blue Sox —less than 10—, which is why her statistics were not recorded by the league. But even when she left the league, Betty Jean still kept up her love for baseball. For the next eight years, she played with the Savanna, Illinois All-Star team and five years for the Lakewood, Ohio Rangers team. As well, she took up golf and played in two golf leagues.

== Personal life ==
Betty played in the AAGPBL under her maiden name. After that, she was married to Michael Rusynyk for 66 years. They had two sons and one daughter: Gary, David and Lynn. When Betty died, she was survived by four grandchildren: Sanya, Kristen, Megan and Alexander. One grandchild, Taryn, died before her.
