= Fredda Acker =

- Pitcher
- Born: September 28, 1925; Anderson County, South Carolina, US
- Died: September 18, 1980 (aged 54); Atlanta, Georgia, US
- Batted: Right Threw: Right

Teams
- South Bend Blue Sox (1947)

Career highlights and awards
- Mrs. America 1947; Women in Baseball – AAGPBL Permanent Display at Baseball Hall of Fame and Museum (1988)

Fredda Louise Thompson (later Acker; September 28, 1925 – September 18, 1980) was a professional baseball player and beauty queen. She joined the All-American Girls Professional Baseball League (AAGPBL) in 1947 and was used mainly for publicity purposes.

Born in Anderson County, South Carolina, Fredda was the daughter of Henry and Mae (née Abercrombie) Thompson. Her father, who worked in the local textile mill, encouraged Fredda and her brothers and sisters at a young age to actively participate in different sports. As a teenager, she began playing amateur softball for the textile teams and excelled as a hard-throwing pitcher. After high school graduation, she married John Lewis Acker in 1944.

In November 1946, Fredda Acker was named Mrs. America 1947 in replacement of Janice Pollock, original winner of the contest who had to decline a six-month tour of the country as part of her reward because of her husband's disapproval.

The first AAGPBL spring training outside the United States was held in 1947 in Havana, Cuba, as part of a plan to create an International League of Girls Baseball. The league hired Acker to assist in a charm school and fashion show during the trip. At the time, the Brooklyn Dodgers trained in the Cuban capital because Jackie Robinson, who would be the first Afro-American to play in the Major Leagues, was training with the Dodgers for the first time. By then, city ordinances in Vero Beach, Florida, where the Dodgers normally trained, prevented blacks and white players from competing on the same field against each other. Notably, newspaper stories from Havana indicate that the All-American girls drew larger crowds for their exhibition games at Estadio Latinoamericano than did the Dodgers.

After spring training, Acker signed a contract to play in the league. She was assigned to the South Bend Blue Sox and joined her older sister, Viola Thompson, who pitched in the team. Nevertheless, Acker never appeared in a game during the regular season. Little is known about her after that period.

Fredda Acker died in 1980 in Atlanta, just ten days shy of her 55th birthday. She is interred at Forest Lawn Memorial Cemetery in Anderson.
