= Mary Holda =

American baseball player

- Third base / Shortstop
- Born: September 30, 1915; Mansfield, Ohio, U.S.
- Died: April 14, 2016 (aged 100)
- Batted: Right Threw: Right

Teams
- South Bend Blue Sox (1943)

Career highlights and awards
- Women in Baseball – AAGPBL Permanent Display at Baseball Hall of Fame and Museum (1988)

Mary Holda, later Elrod (September 30, 1915 – April 14, 2016) was a utility infielder who played in the All-American Girls Professional Baseball League (AAGPBL). She batted and threw right-handed.

A native of Mansfield, Ohio, Holda was one of the original South Bend Blue Sox founding members of the All-American Girls Professional Baseball League in its 1943 inaugural season. Known as "Bucky" by her teammates, she served primarily as a backup at third base and shortstop for South Bend. She was also available for pinch hitting duties, while posting a .205 batting average in 29 games.

Holda is part of Women in Baseball, a permanent display based at the Baseball Hall of Fame and Museum in Cooperstown, New York, which was unveiled in 1988 to honor the entire All-American Girls Professional Baseball League.

== Career statistics ==
Batting

GP	AB	R	H	2B	3B	HR	RBI	SB	TB	BB	SO	BA	OBP	SLG
29	73	9	15	0	0	0	6	8	15	4	11	.205	.247	.205

Fielding

GP	PO	A	E	TC	DP	FA
19	30	31	5	66	2	.924
