= Judy McCormick =

American baseball player

- Pitcher
- Born: Chicago, Illinois, U.S.
- Bats: Left Throws: Left

Teams
- South Bend Blue Sox (1954)

Judy McCormick was an All-American Girls Professional Baseball League player. She batted and threw left handed.

Born in Chicago, Illinois, Judy McCormick joined the All American League in its 1954 season. McCormick was assigned as a pitcher for the South Bend Blue Sox club but did not have much of a chance to play during the season, as she hurled an inning of shutout ball and did not have a decision.

The league folded at the end of that season, but there is a permanent display at the Baseball Hall of Fame and Museum at Cooperstown, New York, since 1988 that honors the entire league rather than any individual figure.
