= Joanne Ogden =

Joanne "Jo" Ogden (born April 23, 1933) played in the position of Second Base in the All-American Girls Professional Baseball League (AAGPBL) in 1953. She both threw and batted right-handed.

== Career ==
=== Late start ===
Jo had been playing softball since the age of 10 and loved hardball. In fact, whenever she could, she played ball with the boys. She was 20 years old when she got the position of second base for the South Bend Blue Sox. She learned about the AAGPBL recruiting from an article she read in her local Rochester newspaper. Thereafter she contacted the South Bend Blue Sox and was given a tryout almost immediately. When Jo was accepted for the team, she did already have some experience. She had been playing softball in an independent league for the Van Grafflins TNT’s and in a tri-city league. She got time off from her job at Eastman Kodak for the tryouts and got in. She described the Blue Sox as “a super team”.

=== Playing in the league ===
One of her best moments playing in the league was the game she participated in against the Fort Wayne Daisies, the first time she was put behind one of the best pitchers in the league, Jean Faut. To her, this was both nerve-wracking and exciting. The next game was Fort Wayne coming to South Bend, during which time she “hit four for four, a perfect night at the plate.” Jo remembered being on third base once, running for home when the bat cracked. The ball then skipped through the infield to the centerfielder who scooped it up and threw it perfectly to Jo at home plate. She describes it all as "such a great experience".

== Life after baseball ==
She only spent a year with the league because, in 1954, she was offered the position of a university assistant counselor. After graduation, she became a Health, Physical Education, and Science teacher (grades 8-12) and worked in this field for three decades until she retired.

== Career statistics ==
Year	G	AB	R	H	2B	3B	HR	RBI	SB	BB	SO	AVG
1953	42	87	11	22	2	0	0	5	6	4	9	.253
