= Janet Campbell (baseball) =

Janet Campbell was an All-American Girls Professional Baseball League player.

Campbell appears in the records as a member of the South Bend Blue Sox club during its 1951 season.

Nevertheless, the league stopped individual achievements after 1948, so individual accomplishments are complete only through 1949.

The AAGPBL folded in 1954, but there is a permanent display at the Baseball Hall of Fame and Museum at Cooperstown, New York, since November 5, 1988, that honors the entire league rather than any individual figure.
