= Ann Garman =

American baseball player (1933–2022)

- First base
- Born: March 11, 1933; Avilla, Indiana, U.S.
- Died: September 25, 2022 (aged 89)
- Batted: Right Threw: Right

Teams
- South Bend Blue Sox (1953)

Career highlights and awards
- Women in Baseball – AAGPBL Permanent Display at the Baseball Hall of Fame and Museum (unveiled in 1988)

Ann Garman (later Hosted; March 11, 1933 – September 25, 2022) was an All-American Girls Professional Baseball League player. Listed at 5' 6", 140 lbs, Garman batted and threw right handed. She was born in Avilla, Indiana.

An above average defender at first base, Garman had a chance to play in the All American League before it folded in 1954. She played in 21 games with the South Bend Blue Sox in its 1953 season. She recorded 195 putouts with seven assists and turned six double plays, while committing only seven errors in 209 total chances for a .967 fielding average. Her hitting was her weak spot, as she posted an average of .154 (10-for-65) with seven RBI and five runs scored while stealing one base.

Garman became a teacher and housewife after baseball. She had three children and was a grandmother of seven. Following her retirement, she moved to Wawaka, Indiana, where she continued to be active in social activities.

In 1988, a permanent display was inaugurated at the Baseball Hall of Fame and Museum at Cooperstown, New York, that honors those who were part of the All-American Girls Professional Baseball League. Garman is included at the display/exhibit.

== Career statistics ==
Batting

GP	AB	R	H	2B	3B	HR	RBI	SB	TB	BB	SO	BA	OBP	SLG	OPS
21	65	5	10	0	0	0	7	1	10	13	13	.154	.295	.154	.449
