= Rose Montalbano =

- Second base
- Born: Staten Island, New York, US
- Bats: Right Throws: Right

Teams
- South Bend Blue Sox (1951); Battle Creek Belles (1952); South Bend Blue Sox (1952–1953); Muskegon Belles (1953)

Career highlights and awards
- Two Championship teams (1951–1952)

Rose "Monty" Montalbano was an American utility infielder who played from 1951 to 1953 in the All-American Girls Professional Baseball League (AAGPBL).

Rose Montalbano saw limited action as a part-time infielder, playing mainly at second base for three clubs during her three years in the league. Montalbano was a member of the South Bend Blue Sox champion team in the 1951 and 1952 seasons, even though she did not play in the championship series.

Montalbano is part of Women in Baseball, a permanent display based at the Baseball Hall of Fame and Museum in Cooperstown, New York, which was unveiled in 1988 to honor the entire All-American Girls Professional Baseball League.

Montalbano has not been located since leaving the league.

== Career statistics ==
Batting

GP	AB	R	H	2B	3B	HR	RBI	SB	BB	SO	BA	OBP
38	63	13	15	1	0	0	9	3	15	20	.221	.385

Fielding

GP	PO	A	E	TC	DP	FA
25	35	38	14	87	3	.839
