= Margie Lang =

American baseball player

- First base / Pitcher
- Born: February 19, 1924; Cincinnati, Ohio, U.S.
- Died: August 29, 2007 (aged 83); Cincinnati, Ohio, U.S.
- Batted: Right Threw: Right

Teams
- South Bend Blue Sox (1943)

Career highlights and awards
- Women in Baseball – AAGPBL Permanent Display at the Baseball Hall of Fame and Museum (unveiled in 1988)

Margie Lang (February 19, 1924 – August 29, 2007) was an American infielder and pitcher who played in the All-American Girls Professional Baseball League (AAGPBL). She batted and threw right handed.

Born in Cincinnati, Ohio, Margie Lang appeared in fewer than ten games for the South Bend Blue Sox during the 1943 season.

In 1988, Margie Lang received further recognition when she became part of Women in Baseball, a permanent display based at the Baseball Hall of Fame and Museum in Cooperstown, New York which was unveiled to honor the entire All-American Girls Professional Baseball League.

She died in 2007 in Cincinnati, Ohio, at the age of 83.
