= Joan Martin =

American baseball player (1933–2019)

- Born: November 17, 1933; Montgomery County, Pennsylvania, U.S.
- Died: July 26, 2019 (aged 85); Erie, Pennsylvania, U.S.

Teams
- South Bend Blue Sox (1951)

Joan Martin (November 11, 1933 – July 26, 2019) was an All-American Girls Professional Baseball League player.

== Baseball career ==
According to All-American League data, Joan Martin played for the South Bend Blue Sox club in its 1951 season. Additional information is incomplete because there are no records available at the time of the request.

== Baseball Hall of Fame ==
In 1988 was inaugurated a permanent display at the Baseball Hall of Fame and Museum at Cooperstown, New York, that honors those who were part of the All-American Girls Professional Baseball League. Joan Martin, along with the rest of the girls and the league staff, is included at the display/exhibit.

== Personal life ==
Martin died on July 26, 2019.
