= Peggy Cramer =

American baseball player

- Catcher
- Born: June 27, 1937; Buchanan, Michigan, U.S.
- Died: August 4, 2016 (aged 79); Talbott, Tennessee, U.S.
- Batted: Right Threw: Right

Teams
- South Bend Blue Sox (1954)

Career highlights and awards
- Women in Baseball – AAGPBL Permanent Display at Baseball Hall of Fame and Museum (1988)

Peggy Corrine Cramer (June 27, 1937 – August 4, 2016) was an American catcher who played for the South Bend Blue Sox of the All-American Girls Professional Baseball League (AAGPBL) in 1954. Listed at 5' 4", 125 lb., she batted and threw right handed.

Cramer was just 16-years old when she joined the league in its last season. After the league folded, she went on to become a teacher for the next 28 years.

In 1988, Cramer became part of Women in Baseball; a permanent display based at the Baseball Hall of Fame and Museum in Cooperstown, New York, which was unveiled to honor the entire All-American Girls Professional Baseball League.

== Sources ==
- The Women of the All-American Girls Professional Baseball League: A Biographical Dictionary – W. C. Madden. Publisher: McFarland & Company, 2005. Format: Softcover, 295 pp. Language: English. ISBN 9780786422630
