= Viola Thompson =

Professional baseball player

- Pitcher
- Born: January 2, 1922; Seneca, South Carolina, U.S.
- Died: December 31, 2017 (aged 95); Belton, South Carolina, U.S.
- Batted: Left Threw: Left
- Stats at Baseball Reference

Teams
- Milwaukee Chicks (1944); Grand Rapids Chicks (1945); South Bend Blue Sox (1946–1947)

Career highlights and awards
- Championship Team (1944); Order of the Palmetto Award (1993); South Carolina Athletic Hall of Fame (1998); Grand Rapids Sports Hall of Fame (2001); T.L. Hannah Athletic Hall of Fame (2014)

Viola Thompson [Griffin] (January 2, 1922 – December 31, 2017) was a pitcher who played from 1944 through 1947 in the All-American Girls Professional Baseball League (AAGPBL). Listed at 5 feet 5 inches (165 cm), 120 pounds (54 kg), she batted and threw left-handed.

A hard-throwing, underhand pitcher, Thompson had a brief but solid career during her four years in the AAGPBL. Since the only organized ball for women in the country was softball, the AAGPBL created a hybrid game which included both softball and baseball. Over the 12 years of history of the league, the rules were gradually modified to more closely resemble baseball. Throwing underhand, Thompson was unable to make the transition to full sidearm in 1947 and overhand pitching in 1948. Throwing multiple underhands, Thompson went on to play in the National Girls Baseball League of Chicago where she played until 1951.

== Early life ==
Thompson, the daughter of Henry Justice and Mae Abercrombie Thompson, was born and raised in Anderson County, South Carolina, where she attended school through high school. She attended Anderson Girls High School and graduated in 1939 and played softball there. Anderson Girls High School would later become part of T. L. Hanna High School. She was born into a large family with six brothers, all but one of whom served in the military, and four sisters. Viola Thompson and all of her siblings either played softball or baseball. Several of her siblings played tennis, some played basketball, and her brother Carlisle, later went on to become a boxer in the Golden Gloves amateur league. Her sister, Fredda Acker, would go on to be named Miss America in 1947. Her sister Margaret went on to become Miss South Carolina USA in 1960. Their father, who worked in the local textile mill, encouraged Viola and her brothers and sisters at a young age to actively participate in different sports. Upon graduation, she moved to Greenville, South Carolina, where she worked in the textile mill and played amateur softball for the company's team. She pitched in the textiles league for both men's and women's softball teams and was also the athletic director of the mill she played for.

While at Greenville, Thompson met Elizabeth Mahon, a talented player with the same passion for baseball, with whom she started a close friendship. Eventually, Thompson played in Greenville on the same team with Mahon. By then, a talent scout offered Thompson and Mahon an invitation to come to the newly formed AAGPBL tryouts, which were to be held at Wrigley Field in Chicago, Illinois. With the prospect of making the $60 per week that was being paid to the members of the established teams, which was a vast sum of money then, the two Greenville girls decided to try their hand in the new circuit, obtaining full-time jobs in the AAGPBL for the 1944 season. Thompson was assigned to the Milwaukee Chicks, while Mahon joined the Minneapolis Millerettes, becoming the only South Carolina ballplayers in AAGPBL history. Mahon died in 2001 at the age of 82.

== Baseball career ==
In her rookie season, Thompson posted a 15–12 record and a 2.88 earned run average as part of a pitching rotation that included Connie Wisniewski (23–10, 2.23) and Josephine Kabick (26–19, 2.66). The Chicks, with Max Carey at the helm, won the pennant and defeated the Kenosha Comets in the championship series. Although the Chicks won the championship, they had no local financial backing and could not compete with the American Association Milwaukee Brewers. In fact, the Chicks were forced to play all seven games of the series at Kenosha's Lake Front Stadium because the Brewers were using Borchert Field in Milwaukee. In addition, the high ticket prices charged for AAGPBL games failed to encourage significant fan support. Due to lack of community support and skepticism of journalists, the Chicks moved to Grand Rapids, Michigan prior to the 1945 season.

Thompson slumped to 11–19 in 1945, even though she collected a low 1.90 ERA in 260 innings pitched for the renamed Grand Rapids Chicks. Nevertheless, she rebounded the next year with the South Bend Blue Sox and went 15–6 with a 2.90 ERA in 31 games. She appeared in only one game for South Bend during the 1947 season as the league moved entirely to sidearm pitching. Her younger sister, Fredda Acker, joined her on the team as an overhand pitcher in that season but never appeared on the All-American roster, perhaps to safeguard her award-winning looks. Organizers of the AAGPBL did not want Viola's sister Fredda to join the league once she was crowned Miss America for publicity purposes. Their minds were changed once they saw how well Fredda could play.

In the late 1940s, league rules changed to make the league more "strictly baseball." The bases were pushed back and pitchers began pitching overhand. Many of the existing female pitchers were not strong enough to pitch overhand so girls started to be pulled in from third base or the outfield to pitch, and pitchers were rotated to the outfield. If they were unsuccessful in the outfield many would try to pitch for a team in Chicago, where underhand pitching was still used. Thompson played in Chicago for a few years until she decided to retire from baseball and go home. She was disappointed by the way the league changed saying, "They had a great game, and I don't know why they were never satisfied, they just wanted to improve and improve."

== Post-playing career ==
In 1948, Thompson was transferred to the National Girls Baseball League of Chicago, where she played through the 1950 season. Following her baseball career, she returned to South Carolina and married Claude Griffin in 1954. The couple had two daughters, Claudia and Carol. Thompson went to work as a supervisor in a textile plant and retired in 1984. She did not participate in or even discuss women's baseball publicly again until the Baseball Hall of Fame's AAGPBL tribute exhibit was unveiled at Cooperstown, New York in 1988. After that, she was interviewed by filmmaker Penny Marshall to get a personal account of her own experiences in the league for the 1992 film A League of Their Own, starring Geena Davis, Tom Hanks, Madonna, Lori Petty, and Rosie O'Donnell, which brought the AAGPBL into the public eye. Thompson claims that she was disappointed by the way that Tom Hanks portrayed the manager. Originally she was intended to have a speaking part in the film. However this became impossible due to union rules. Instead she served as an adviser for the film and she appears as an unpaid extra. Clips from her playing days appear during the end credits of the movie.

Thompson died December 31, 2017, just two days short of her 96th birthday.

== Awards and honors ==
In 1993, Thompson was granted the privilege of the floor of the South Carolina Legislature for her contributions to professional baseball and women's sports. In 1998, she was inducted into the South Carolina Athletic Hall of Fame. The resolution passed by the Legislature is quoted as the following "Congratulating Viola Thompson Griffin, for her contributions to baseball and women's sports and allowing her the privilege of the floor of the House of Representatives on Tuesday, March 2nd, 1993, at a time to be determined by the speaker".

In 2001, Thompson was inducted into the Grand Rapids Sports Hall of Fame. Closer to home, in 2010, the Boy Scouts of America of Belton, South Carolina, honored her with a "Community Leader Award".

In 2014, T.L. Hanna High School, which was previously Anderson Girls High School and Anderson Boys High School when Thompson attended, in Anderson, South Carolina, honored Viola for her athletic achievements at the school by inducting her into the Athletic Hall of Fame.

There are two awards set up in her name that are presented every year at the Belton-Honea Path High School in Honea Path, South Carolina to MVP softball players of the school.

Thompson has thrown out ceremonial pitches for the Anderson University (South Carolina) Softball Team, Greenville Drive Minor League Team, and the Silver Bullets Professional League where Braves player Phil Niekro caught for her.

The Belton Historical Museum in Belton, South Carolina opened a permanent exhibit honoring Viola in June 2015.

On January 26, 1993, she received the Order of the Palmetto award. This award recognizes lifetime achievement and service and is the highest honor for civilians awarded by the Governor of South Carolina.

== Career statistics ==
Thompson's career statistics are as follows:

Pitching

GP	W	L	W-L%	ERA	IP	H	RA	ER	BB	SO	WHIP
99	41	37	.526	2.51	685	621	315	191	236	99	1.25

Batting

GP	AB	R	H	2B	3B	HR	RBI	SB	BB	SO	BA	OBP
99	211	11	20	0	0	0	12	2	39	41	.095	.236

Fielding

GP	PO	A	E	TC	FA
99	29	184	39	252	.876
