= Shirley Kleinhans =

American baseball player

- Pitcher
- Born: November 2, 1928; Sheboygan Falls, Wisconsin, U.S.
- Died: August 23, 2001 (aged 72); Plymouth, Wisconsin, U.S.
- Batted: Right Threw: Right

Teams
- South Bend Blue Sox (1948)

Career highlights and awards
- Women in Baseball – AAGPBL Permanent Display at the Baseball Hall of Fame and Museum (since 1988)

Shirley Kleinhans [Sommer] (November 2, 1928 – August 23, 2001) was an American pitcher who played in the All-American Girls Professional Baseball League (AAGPBL).

Kleinhans joined the league with the South Bend Blue Sox club during its 1948 season. Her career was cut short because of a back injury.

Born in Sheboygan Falls, Wisconsin, Kleinhans was the daughter of Edward W. Kleinhans and Olga M. Schmidt. She worked on her parents’ farm and attended Howards Grove High School in Wisconsin, where she graduated in 1946.

Afterwards, Kleinhans went on to play dartball for 17 years and worked at the Winnebago Indian School in Wisconsin. She married George A. Sommer in 1957. They raised two children, while operating a cattle farm and then a rabbit farm.

She died in 2001 in Plymouth, Wisconsin, at the age of 72.

In 1988 a permanent display was inaugurated at the Baseball Hall of Fame and Museum at Cooperstown, New York, that honors those who were part of the All-American Girls Professional Baseball League. Kleinhans, along with the rest of the girls and the league staff, is included at the display/exhibit.
