= Lavina Keough =

American baseball player

- Pitcher
- Born: March 13, 1927; Clinton, Wisconsin, U.S.
- Died: August 24, 2001 (aged 74)

Teams
- South Bend Blue Sox (1945–1946)

Career highlights and awards
- Women in Baseball – AAGPBL Permanent Display at the Baseball Hall of Fame and Museum (since 1988)

Lavina Frances Keough (March 13, 1927 – August 24, 2001) was an American baseball player who played with the South Bend Blue Sox club of the All-American Girls Professional Baseball League (AAGPBL) during the 1945 and 1946 seasons. Keough wore uniform number 7, and made a pitching appearance in 1945. She pitched only one inning and did not have a decision.

Keough married Edward L. Pierson Jr., in 1945 in Sacramento, California. They had five children. She filed for divorce in 1969, citing cruel and inhuman treatment.

The All-American Girls Professional Baseball League folded in 1954, but there is now a permanent display at the Baseball Hall of Fame and Museum at Cooperstown, New York, since November 5, 1988, that honors those who were part of the league. Lavina Keough, along with the rest of the girls and the league staff, is included at the display/exhibit.
