= Lillian Luckey =

American baseball player (1919–2021)

- Pitcher
- Born: July 9, 1919; South Bend, Indiana, U.S.
- Died: December 13, 2021 (aged 102); Niles, Michigan, U.S.
- Batted: Right Threw: Right

Teams
- South Bend Blue Sox (1946)

Lillian Ann Luckey (July 9, 1919 – December 13, 2021) was an American baseball pitcher who played in the All-American Girls Professional Baseball League (AAGPBL). Listed at 5 ft 1 in (1.55 m), 126 lb (57 kg), she batted and threw right handed.

Born in South Bend, Indiana on July 9, 1919, Luckey joined the All American League in its 1946 season. She was assigned to the South Bend Blue Sox club and appeared in eight games for them.

She posted a 2–4 record with a 3.44 ERA, allowing 37 runs - 21 earned - on 51 hits and 48 walks, while striking out 10 through 54 innings of work. As a hitter, she went 2 for 15 for a .133 batting average.

The All American League folded in 1954, but there is a permanent display at the Baseball Hall of Fame and Museum at Cooperstown, New York, since 1988 that honors the entire league rather than any individual figure.

In July 2008, it was reported that Luckey still played golf twice a week at the age of 89. She died in Niles, Michigan, on December 13, 2021, at the age of 102.
