= Dorothy Christ =

American baseball player (1925–2020)

- Outfielder
- Born: September 9, 1925; La Porte, Indiana, U.S.
- Died: November 2, 2020 (aged 95); La Porte, Indiana, U.S.
- Batted: Right Threw: Right

Teams
- South Bend Blue Sox (1948)

Career highlights and awards
- Women in Baseball – AAGPBL Permanent Display at Baseball Hall of Fame and Museum (since 1988)

Dorothy Christ (September 9, 1925 – November 2, 2020) was an American baseball player who was a backup outfielder in the All-American Girls Professional Baseball League (AAGPBL). Christ batted and threw right handed.

Born in La Porte, Indiana in September 1925, Christ was assigned to the South Bend Blue Sox during its 1948 season. She appeared in one game and went hitless in one at-bat.

After baseball, Christ moved to Mishawaka, Indiana. The AAGPBL folded in 1954, but there is a permanent display at the Baseball Hall of Fame and Museum at Cooperstown, New York, since November 5, 1988, that honors the entire league rather than any individual figure.

Christ died in La Porte, Indiana in November 2020, at the age of 95.
