= Maxine Drinkwater =

American baseball player (1936–2024)

- First base, second base
- Born: May 19, 1936; Searsmont, Maine, U.S.
- Died: February 11, 2024 (aged 87); Rockland, Maine, U.S.
- Batted: Right Threw: Right

Teams
- South Bend Blue Sox (1954)

Career highlights and awards
- Women in Baseball – AAGPBL Permanent Display at Baseball Hall of Fame and Museum (1988)

Maxine Drinkwater (née Simmons; May 19, 1936 – February 11, 2024) was an American baseball player who was first basewoman and second basewoman for the South Bend Blue Sox of the All-American Girls Professional Baseball League (AAGPBL).

Spending her childhood in Camden, Maine, Simmons spent summers playing baseball with her brothers and other kids from the neighborhood, exhibiting a distinct aptitude for the game. In a 2005 interview, Simmons recalled: "I didn't have to learn how to play. I just knew. We had a good group of neighborhood kids and I lived right near the field."

Drinkwater garnered the attention of the AAGPBL's followers after she became the South Bend Blue Sox's first pick at the league's 1954 tryouts. In her sole season playing in the league, Max ranked as one of the league's top defensive second basewomen. Playing in 45 of the team's 111 games, Simmons boasted a .947 fielding percentage. However, she struggled offensively, batting only .147 with an OBP of .243. Her performance earned her a place in the National Baseball Hall of Fame and, in 2005, Maine's Baseball Hall of Fame. On being the first woman to be inducted, then 69-year-old Maxine reportedly said, "I think it's pretty good. It's been a long time coming."

The league folded after the 1954 season, ending Simmons' professional baseball career. She latterly resided in Rockland, Maine. Drinkwater died on February 11, 2024, at the age of 87.

== Career statistics ==
Batting

GP	AB	R	H	2B	3B	HR	RBI	SB	TB	BB	SO	BA	OBP	SLG	OPS
45	95	8	14	0	0	0	4	1	14	12	22	.147	.243	.147	.390

Fielding

GP	PO	A	E	TC	DP	FA
39	233	27	16	276	14	.942
