= Janet Jamieson =

American softball player

- Outfielder
- Born: April 3, 1927 (age 99); Minneapolis, Minnesota, U.S.
- Bats: Right Throws: Right

Teams
- South Bend Blue Sox (1948)

Career highlights and awards
- Women in Baseball – AAGPBL Permanent Display at the Baseball Hall of Fame and Museum (since 1988)

Janet Jamieson (born April 3, 1927) is an American former outfielder who played in the All-American Girls Professional Baseball League (AAGPBL). She batted and threw right handed.

Born in Minneapolis, Minnesota, Janet Jamieson was a skilled softball player on a championship team, even though her All-American Girls Professional Baseball League career never really took off afterwards. She appeared in one game with the South Bend Blue Sox during its 1948 season, and went hitless in her only at bat and did not have fielding chances.

Jamieson went into banking after baseball. In addition, she became a nationally ranked table tennis player.

The All-American Girls Professional Baseball League folded in 1954, but there is a permanent display at the Baseball Hall of Fame and Museum at Cooperstown, New York, since November 5, 1988, that honors the entire league rather than any individual figure.
