= Genevieve George =

Canadian baseball player

- Catcher
- Born: September 27, 1927; Regina, Saskatchewan, Canada
- Died: March 11, 2002 (aged 74); Regina, Saskatchewan, Canada
- Batted: Right Threw: Right

Teams
- Muskegon Lassies (1948)

Career highlights and awards
- Women in Baseball – AAGPBL Permanent Display at the Baseball Hall of Fame and Museum (unveiled in 1988); Canadian Baseball Hall of Fame and Museum Honorary Induction (1998)

Genevieve "Gene" George (later McFaul; September 27, 1927 – March 11, 2002) was a Canadian catcher who played in the All-American Girls Professional Baseball League (AAGPBL). Listed at 5' 3", 110 lb., she batted and threw right handed.

Born in Regina, Saskatchewan, Genevieve George was one of the sixty eight girls from Canada who played in the All-American Girls Professional Baseball League during its 12-year history. She grew up in a household with nine children, which gave her plenty of playmates. At age 13, she began playing in a city softball league. When she was 16, six other Regina ballplayers joined the All American League, including her elder sister Bonnie Baker.

Like her sister, George was a catcher, a valuable commodity in the league. She then earned an opportunity in 1948 and was assigned to the Muskegon Lassies, where she played as a backup for incumbent Dorothy Maguire. The 20-year rookie was sparingly used, as she only caught 14 games during the season. George then was not offered a contract to return the next season.

She posted a batting average of .154 (2-for-13) with a run scored and two runs batted in. On the field, she handled 19 putouts with two assists without committing an error. Afterwards, she came to Regina and started to play at third base for the city team. In 1951, she married Canadian Football League tackle Jim McFaul. The couple fostered two sons, Jim and George, and had five grandchildren. In between, she played with Regina through 1959, winning the World Championship with the team in 1954. She was widowed in 1994.

In 1988, Genevieve George received further recognition when she became part of Women in Baseball, a permanent display based at the Baseball Hall of Fame and Museum in Cooperstown, New York, which was unveiled to honor the entire All-American Girls Professional Baseball League. She also gained honorary induction into the Canadian Baseball Hall of Fame in 1998.

Genevieve George died on March 11, 2002, in Regina, Saskatchewan, aged 74.

== Career statistics ==
Batting

GP	AB	R	H	2B	3B	HR	RBI	SB	TB	BB	SO	BA	OBP	SLG	OPS
15	13	1	2	0	0	0	2	0	2	0	4	.154	.154	.154	.308
