= Doris Jones (baseball) =

American baseball player

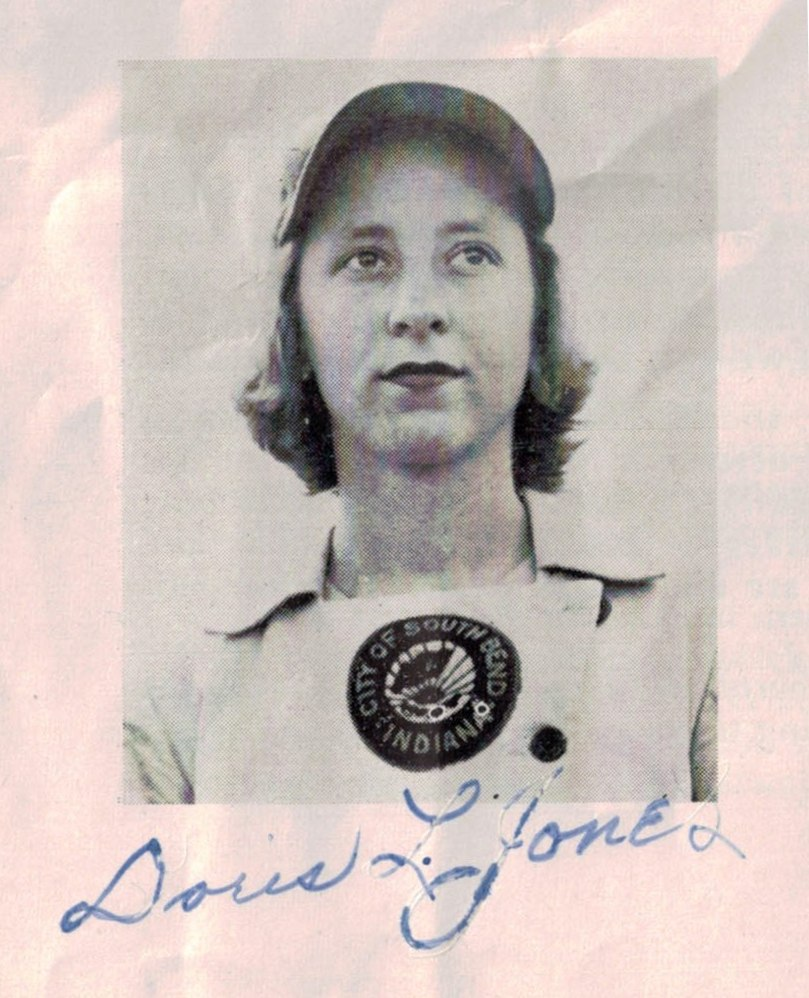
- Born: 1924; Sellersburg, Indiana, U.S.
- Bats: Right Throws: Right

Teams
- South Bend Blue Sox (1945)

Career highlights and awards
- Women in Baseball – AAGPBL Permanent Display at the Baseball Hall of Fame and Museum (since 1988)

Doris Jones (born 1924) was a member of the All-American Girls Professional Baseball League (AAGPBL). She was born in Sellersburg, Indiana. In 1945, she played for the South Bend Blue Sox, in South Bend, Indiana. Doris only played for one season and was simultaneously enrolled at Georgetown College, majoring in Art. Her ambition was to become a professional cartoonist.
