= Ellen Tronnier =

American baseball player

- Outfielder
- Born: June 28, 1927; Cudahy, Wisconsin, U.S.
- Died: May 21, 2015 (aged 87); Milwaukee, Wisconsin, U.S.
- Batted: Right Threw: Right

Teams
- South Bend Blue Sox (1943)

Ellen J. Tronnier (June 28, 1927 – May 21, 2015) was an outfielder who played in the All-American Girls Professional Baseball League (AAGPBL). Listed at 5'6" (1.71 m), 135 lb. (61 k), she batted and threw right handed.

The AAGPBL emerged in the spring of 1943, being formed as a non-profit organization as an initiative of Philip K. Wrigley, chewing gum magnate and owner of the Chicago Cubs Major League Baseball club. Wrigley conceived the idea as a promotional sideline to maintain interest in baseball as the World War II military draft was depleting Major League rosters of first-line players. By sending out scouts and setting up tryouts in dozens of major cities, Wrigley attracted hundreds of girls from all over America and Canada who were eager to play in this new professional league. Of these, only 280 were invited to the final tryouts at Wrigley Field in Chicago where 60 were chosen to become the first girls to ever play professional baseball.

Born in Cudahy, Wisconsin, Ellen Tronnier joined the league when she was only 16 years old, after surviving two exhausting tryouts. The first was held locally at Borchert Field, where only 16 ladies were chosen to go on to Chicago for the decisive tryout. Tronnier was one of the lucky ones and was assigned to the South Bend Blue Sox.

After one season, Tronnier decided to return to school and enrolled in the University of Wisconsin–La Crosse. Upon completion of her degree, she taught physical education in the Milwaukee Public Schools during 33 years, working at South Division High School and Sholes Middle School.

Besides, Tronnier played softball for a long time, competing in several tournaments as an accomplished women's fast pitch softball player for nearly 27 years. During this period, her teams won league, state and regional championships and, in 1956, her club won the National Invitational Tournament. Then, during the 1970s she opened a baseball school for girls as part of the Milwaukee Recreation Department.

The AABPBL folded after the 1954 season. Twenty-six years later, June Peppas, a former star pitcher in the league, began assembling a list of names and addresses of former AAGPBL players and worked into a newsletter that resulted in the AAGPBL's first-ever reunion at Chicago's Wrigley Field in 1982. Starting from that reunion, a Players Association was formed in 1986 and many former AAGPBL players continued to enjoy reunions, which became annual events in 1988. Tronnier attended the reunions and regained communication with her teammates and old friends. Of the approximately 560 ladies who had played in the league, most had lost touch with the others, at least not until the reunion held in Chicago.

Through the organization of the All American Girls Professional Baseball League Players Association, the Baseball Hall of Fame and Museum opened in 1988 an AAGPBL permanent display at Cooperstown, New York, which is dedicated to the entire league rather than any individual personalities. Tronnier, along with the rest of the league's girls, is now enshrined in the Hall. It was inspiration enough for the 1992 film A League of Their Own, directed by Penny Marshall and starred by Geena Davis, Tom Hanks and Madonna, where was depicted what these pioneering girls endured.

Tronnier gained induction into the Wisconsin Amateur Softball Association Hall of Fame in 1990. She remained active after retirement, advising young people while signing baseball cards and talking about her playing days.

Ellen Tronnier died in 2015 in Milwaukee, Wisconsin at the age of 87. She was interred at Arlington Park Cemetery in Greenfield, Wisconsin.
