= Alice Meyer (baseball) =

American baseball player

- Outfielder
- Born: Chicago, Illinois, U.S.
- Bats: Right Throws: Right

Teams
- South Bend Blue Sox (1948)

Alice Meyer was a backup outfielder who played in the All-American Girls Professional Baseball League (AAGPBL). She batted and threw right handed.

Meyer spent a season with the South Bend Blue Sox in 1949 and appeared in 37 games. She hit a batting average of .211 (19-for-90) with six runs scored and 13 RBI, including two triples and nine stolen bases.

The AAGPBL folded in 1954, but there is a permanent display at the Baseball Hall of Fame and Museum at Cooperstown, New York, since November 5, 1988, that honors the entire league rather than any individual figure.
