= Karl Winsch =

- Manager
- Born: February 10, 1915; Allentown, Pennsylvania, U.S.
- Died: December 21, 2001 (aged 86); Quakertown, Pennsylvania, U.S.
- Batted: n/a Threw: n/a

Career statistics
- Games: 419
- Wins: 232
- Losses: 187
- W-L%: .554

Teams
- South Bend Blue Sox (1951–1954)

Career highlights and awards
- Two Championship Titles (1951-'52); Three playoff appearances (1951-'52, 1954)

Karl Edgar Winsch (February 10, 1915 – December 21, 2001) was an American pitcher and manager in Minor League Baseball. Listed at 5 ft 10 in (1.78 m), 180 lb., Winsch batted and threw right-handed.

A native of Allentown, Pennsylvania, Karl Winsch spent two decades in baseball as a player and manager. A good pitching prospect, Winsch was signed by the Philadelphia Phillies in the early 1940s, but he never made the Major Leagues and had to conform with a modest career in the Phillies minor league system. After that, he managed in the All-American Girls Professional Baseball League (AAGPBL).

Karl Winsch married Jean Faut, a pitcher for the South Bend Blue Sox in 1947. They were divorced after 21 years of marriage. He died in Quakertown, Pennsylvania, at the age of 86.

== Career summary ==
=== 1940s ===
Winsch started 1942 with Class-C Rome Colonels and later was promoted to Double-A Trenton Packers. He combined for a 1–7 record with a 4.24 earned run average in 48 games for Rome (12) and Trenton (36), allowing 87 hits in 87.0 innings of work. In 1943 he went 10–9 with a 4.58 ERA in 40 games for the Packers, tying for first in the Interstate League with 13 batters hit by pitches and for second in pitching appearances. He also allowed 171 hits and 99 walks while striking out 99 in a career-high 171.0 innings. Winsch was ascended to Class-A in 1944, his last minor league season, and finished with a 4–4 mark and a 4.04 ERA in 24 games with the Utica Blue Sox.

In a three-year career, Winsch posted a 15–20 record with a 4.36 ERA in 112 games, allowing 216 runs (45 unearned) and 332 hits in 353.0 innings of work.

In 1947 Winsch married Jean Faut, who at the time was ranked among the premier players in the AAGPBL. While playing for Utica, he had been managed by Eddie Sawyer, whose leadership inspired him to an eventual career as a baseball coach or manager. His opportunity came in 1951, when he became the manager of the South Bend Blue Sox, his wife's team. Winsch enjoyed a distinguished career in the last four years of the circuit, leading South Bend to consecutive championship titles in 1951 and 1952 and a playoff berth in 1954.

=== 1950s ===
With Winsch at the helm, the Blue Sox started strong in 1951, finishing third in the first half (38–22) before improving to first place (38–14) in the second half of the season. In the first round of the playoffs, South Bend beat the Fort Wayne Daisies in three games. The final series took all five games to decide the champion team. The Rockford Peaches held a 2–0 advantage in the series and looked to take it all, but South Bend rebounded and won the last three games to clinch the title. In Game 3 Faut stopped the Peaches in their tracks, pitching a convincing six-hit, 3–2 victory, and picked up the win in a seven-inning relief effort in decisive Game 5. She also hit a .300 batting average (6-for-20) with three runs batted in to continue her winning ways.

Unfortunately for Winsch and his wife, most girls in the league were unmarried, making Faut odd-woman-out on her team. After becoming manager of the Blue Sox, it made the situation even stickier and increased his wife's isolation from the rest of the team. Everything came to a head after winning his aforementioned second title, when he became more demanding of his players. In that season, some of the South Bend players bristled under his leadership, many refusing to speak to either the manager or their star pitcher. When toward the end of the year, Winsch disciplined one of the girls by suspending her for not going in to pinch-run quickly when asked. Five other players walked out in protest, leaving Winsch's team short-handed for the rest of the season.

South Bend would finish the 1953 season second from last (45–65). Nevertheless, Faut posted a 17–11 record, tying for first in the AAGPBL in wins and for the third consecutive season led all pitchers with her 1.51 earned run average, being the only Blue Sox pitcher to have a winning record. She retired at the end of the season.

In 1954 Winsch guided the Blue Sox to a second place (48–44), during what turned out to be the league's final season. South Bend lost in the first round of the playoffs to the eventual champion Kalamazoo Lassies, two to one games. He also managed the All-Star Team in that season.

In a four-year managing career, Winsch collected a record of 232 wins and 187 losses (.554 W-L%) during the regular season and went 11–7 (.611) in the postseason.

Winsch is part of the AAGPBL permanent display at the Baseball Hall of Fame and Museum at Cooperstown, New York, opened in 1988, which is dedicated to the entire league rather than any individual player. The AAGPBL folded in 1954, yet it was not really a well known fact until the 1992 film A League of Their Own, directed by Penny Marshall, which brought many of the real AAGPBL players a rebirth of celebrity with the first season of the circuit.
