= Nancy DeShone =

American baseball player (1932–2007)

- Outfielder
- Born: March 22, 1932; Elkhart, Indiana, U.S.
- Died: October 6, 2007 (aged 75); South Bend, Indiana, U.S.
- Batted: Left Threw: Left

Teams
- South Bend Blue Sox (1948)

Career highlights and awards
- Women in Baseball – AAGPBL Permanent Display at the Baseball Hall of Fame and Museum (unveiled in 1988)

Nancy DeShone [Rockwell / Dinehart] (March 22, 1932 – October 6, 2007) was an All-American Girls Professional Baseball League player. Listed at 5' 3", 120 lb., she batted and threw left handed.

Born in Elkhart, Indiana, Nancy DeShone attended Theodore Roosevelt High School in Indiana, where she earned a number of ribbons while participating in the school sports for girls.

A strong-armed, left-handed pitcher, she hurled for the Miles Laboratories club in a fastpitch softball factory league, leading Miles to a championship title in South Bend, Indiana. While pitching in a championship game, she was approached by an All American League scout and was drafted in 1948.

At age 16, DeShone joined the South Bend Blue Sox and was assigned as an outfielder. But she did not see much action, going hitless in two at bats in a game, because she primed as a pitcher. She then was dealt to the Fort Wayne Daisies in 1949, but she decided to return to school and earn her diplom.

After graduation, Nancy worked in sales and management and married Rodney Rockwell in 1950. The couple had four daughters: Debbi, Sherry, Jacki and Conni. Her husband died in 1992. She later married James Dinehart and became the stepmother of James' children: Kathleen, Debra, Laura, Martin and Dale.

In between, Nancy remained interested in baseball and coached women's softball, Little League Baseball, and tee-ball for children aged 4 to 8 over the years.

In 1993, Nancy was the chairperson for the 50th reunion of the AAGPBL Players Association held in South Bend, where she coordinated activities for more of 200 former league's players at the five-day event.

The All-American Girls Professional Baseball League folded in 1954, but there is a permanent display at the Baseball Hall of Fame and Museum at Cooperstown, New York, since 1988 that honors the entire league rather than any individual figure.

Nancy DeShone died in 2007 in South Bend, Indiana, at the age of 75.
