= Marion Hosbein =

American baseball player (born 1937)

- Fourth outfielder
- Born: January 29, 1937 (age 88); Coloma, Michigan, U.S.
- Bats: Right Throws: Right

Teams
- South Bend Blue Sox (1954)

Career highlights and awards
- Women in Baseball – AAGPBL Permanent Display at the Baseball Hall of Fame and Museum (unveiled in 1988)

Marion Hosbein (born January 29, 1937) is a former All-American Girls Professional Baseball League player. Listed at 5' 8", 138 lb., she batted and threw right handed.

Born in Coloma, Michigan, Marion Hosbein played at outfield in less of ten games for the South Bend Blue Sox in 1954, during what turned out to be the league's final season.

Afterwards, Hosbein returned home and worked as a letter carrier for the U.S. Postal Service. Following her retirement, she moved to Kalamazoo, Michigan, where she was active in social activities.

In 1988, Marion Hosbein received further recognition when she became part of Women in Baseball, a permanent display based at the Baseball Hall of Fame and Museum in Cooperstown, New York which was unveiled to honor the entire All-American Girls Professional Baseball League.
