= Anne Doyle (sportscaster) =

American woman leader

Anne Doyle is an American journalist, and one of the first women TV sports broadcasters in the United States. As a sports reporter and anchor for WJBK in Detroit from 1978 to 1983, she played a leadership role in achieving equal access to sports locker rooms for women journalists.

In 2009, she was elected to the city council of Auburn Hills, Michigan, and served from 2010 to 2013.

Doyle is the president of the Michigan chapter of the International Women's Forum, and is the author of the book, Powering Up: How America's Women Achievers Become Leaders. She is the daughter of former Detroit sports broadcaster Vince Doyle, who died due to heart failure, in 1990.

Doyle received her B.A. from the University of Michigan, where she studied Spanish and political science. She also studied at the Medill School of Journalism at Northwestern University and overseas, at the University of Spain.

== Education and background ==
Doyle studied at the University of Madrid from 1969 to 1970, where she studied Spanish language, culture and literature. She attended the Medill School of Journalism at Northwestern University from 1972 to 1973, and received her B.A. from the University of Michigan, where she studied Spanish and political science.

She acquired her first experience in the field of reporting and journalism, working as an intern for WUOM, the university's NPR station as a news anchor and reporter.(See LinkedIn profile)

During her time with Ford Motor Company, she took several courses in 2000, at the Kennedy School of Business, at Harvard. While she worked with Ford, Doyle was named by Automotive News as one of the 100 Leading Women in the Auto Industry.

== Career ==
Doyle became one of the first women hired in the US as a major TV sports anchor and reporter in 1978. The Detroit Free Press reported in May 2006 about Doyle, "In places that reeked of testosterone, Anne Doyle spent years breaking barriers for women and letting in fresh air. From the locker room to the boardroom, she was a woman working and winning in a man's world." She tried countless times to enter into professional sports locker rooms to report but was continuously denied.

Doyle would cover the NFL, NBA, NHL, MLB, NASCAR, Formula One and the Big Ten and would report on the World Series, Super Bowl, and a number of Rose Bowls. Prior to covering sports, Doyle served as a radio and TV news reporter and anchor in Los Angeles, Detroit, Grand Rapids, and Lansing, Michigan. She was also a news editor for United Press International where she worked in the Atlanta bureau along with writing for the Detroit Free Press.

Doyle eventually left her position as a sports journalist, to become part of the communication team with Ford Motor Company, in the 1980s. She was promoted to the position of director of North American Communications (1987-2001). Her work involved working with powerful leaders including union officials and members of Congress. She was part of the executive team that was involved in the Firestone Tires and Ford Explorer crisis.

Doyle wrote columns for Forbes magazine from 2011 to 2014, while serving as city councilwoman in Auburn Hills, Michigan (2010-2013). In 2002, she began taking on a leadership role, as a speaker at numerous events, sharing her views on communication and leadership skills necessary to advance women's roles in addressing current events. She authored a book, Powering Up!, and hosts two podcasts by the same name. Doyle is the president of the Michigan chapter of the International Women's Forum.

== Awards and recognition ==
For her pioneering work in the 1970s and early 80's, Doyle was named to the Michigan Journalism Hall of Fame (2007) and listed in the "Who's Who of American Women in the South" (1987).

In 2000, doyle was named by Automotive News as one of the 100 Leading Women in the Auto Industry.

Like her father, she became an Honorary Lifetime Member of the Detroit Sports Media association, formerly Detroit Sports Broadcasters Association (2016), founded in 1948 by pioneer Detroit Tigers announcer Ty Tyson.
