= Peggy Fenton =

American baseball player

- First base/Outfield
- Born: October 12, 1927; Forest Park, Illinois, U.S.
- Died: June 16, 2013 (aged 85); Chicago Ridge, Illinois, U.S.
- Batted: Left Threw: Left

Teams
- Muskegon Lassies (1948); South Bend Blue Sox (1948)

Career highlights and awards
- Women in Baseball – AAGPBL Permanent Display at the Baseball Hall of Fame and Museum (since 1988)

Peggy L. Fenton (October 12, 1927 – June 16, 2013) played for the Muskegon Lassies and the South Bend Blue Sox of the All-American Girls Professional Baseball League (AAGPBL) during the 1948 season. She batted and threw left-handed.

She later was a longtime employee of BP Amoco Oil, retiring as Master Chief after 26 years of service in both the United States Marines and Naval Reserves.
