= Mary Lou Graham =

- Batgirl / Relief pitcher
- Born: August 15, 1936; South Bend, Indiana, U.S.
- Died: December 24, 2024 (aged 88); Oro Valley, Arizona, U.S.
- Batted: Right Threw: Right

Teams
- South Bend Blue Sox (1952[bat girl], 1953[pitcher])

Career highlights and awards
- Championship team (1952); Women in Baseball – AAGPBL Permanent Display at Baseball Hall of Fame and Museum (1988)

Mary Lou Graham (later Hamilton; August 15, 1936 – December 24, 2024) was an American baseball player who was a batgirl and relief pitcher in the All-American Girls Professional Baseball League (AAGPBL). Listed at 5 ft 7 in (1.70 m), 149 lb, she batted and threw right-handed.

Born in South Bend, Indiana, Graham attended John Adams High School. In her spare time, she played baseball, basketball and volleyball in local leagues, going through the ups and downs while supporting her beloved South Bend Blue Sox.

She joined the Blue Sox as their batgirl in the 1952 season. Second place South Bend swept fourth place Grand Rapids Chicks in the best-of-three first round, and later claimed the championship title over the Rockford Peaches, 3 to 2 games.

Graham was invited to a try out in South Bend the next year. She attended and was selected as a pitcher for the Blue Sox. Coming out of the bullpen, she hurled eight innings of relief over six games and was not credited with a decision.

After baseball, she got employment at Bendix Corporation, where she played for the company's bowling team. In 1989 she was inducted into the United States Bowling Congress' Hall of Fame for Superior Performance. Besides this, she played semiprofessional softball and basketball from 1955 to 1957 and later became an avid golfer. Graham as her teammates called her, is part of Women in Baseball, a permanent display based at the Baseball Hall of Fame and Museum in Cooperstown, New York and unveiled in 1988 to honor the entire All-American Girls Professional Baseball League.

Graham remained active in later life. She played golf three to four times a week. She also followed Major League Baseball closely, especially at World Series time. Graham died in Oro Valley, Arizona on December 24, 2024, at the age of 88.
