= Kennedy's Kitchen =

American band

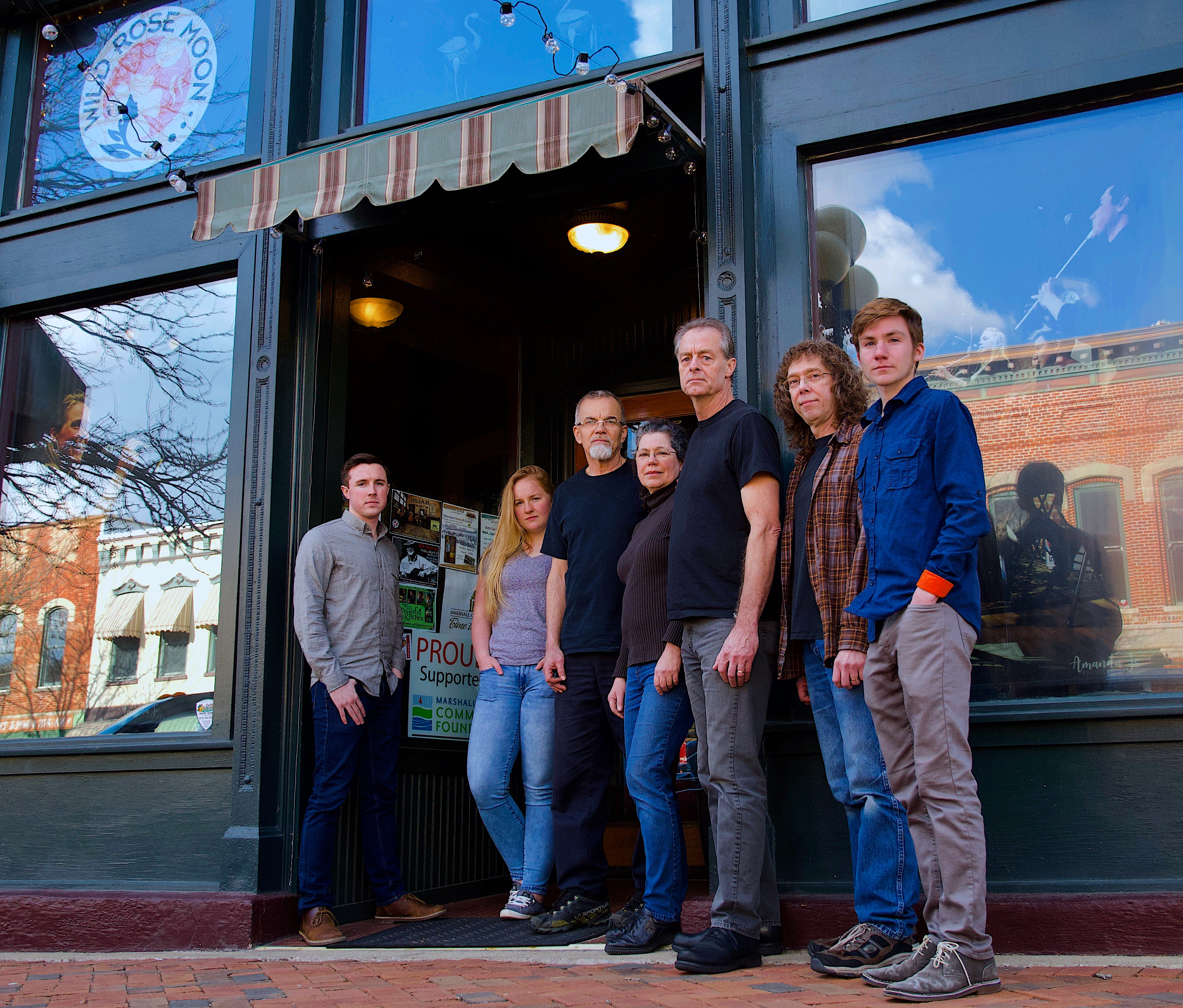

Background information
- Origin: South Bend, Indiana, United States
- Genres: Traditional Irish music, Celtic music
- Years active: 1998-present
- Members: John Kennedy; Mike Bill; Chris O'Brien; Nancy Turner; Jacob Turner; Joel Cooper; Nathan Waddill
- Website: www.kennedyskitchen.com

Kennedy's Kitchen is an American band consisting of seven musicians who compose Traditional Irish music. Since forming in 1998, it has been based in South Bend, Indiana, United States. Led by joHn Kennedy, Kennedy's Kitchen has performed at various venues across the Midwest portion of the United States and beyond.

== History ==
In 1990, John Kennedy helped to form and lead the Irish band Seamaisin. He co-produced two recordings with them Joseph Harvey's Fiddle was Left in the Rain and Seamaisin: Live at the Tin Shop. In 1997, joHn Kennedy also produced music for Dennis Courtney's film adaptation of James Joyce's Araby. Araby was nominated for Student Academy Award in the Narrative Film Category and this led to the formation of Kennedy's Kitchen.

A weekly music session at South Bend's Fiddler's Hearth Irish Pub constitutes the place where Kennedy's Kitchen is rooted. Many of the songs still played today mirror the band's initial focus on cultural traditions and family lineage. The name of the band was inspired by Kennedy's childhood experiences when singing was an important part of family gatherings; for Kennedy, Celtic music is one of his “deepest roots.”

Kennedy's Kitchen regularly performs at national Irish festivals such as the Milwaukee Irish Fest, Chicago’s Irish American Heritage Center's Annual Fest, the Michigan Irish Music Fest, the Dayton Celtic Festival, and the Erin Fest in Peoria, Illinois. Other highlights since 1998 include a performance at the Shaheen Music Center at Saint Mary's College, Indiana in 2001 along with Dervish, Colcannon, and the Baltimore Consort; a performance with The Chieftains in 2004; a 2005 concert at the University of Notre Dame with world champion step dancer Paul Cusick and USA national champion Caitlin Allen; and a performance with Tommy Makem in 2006 at the DeBartolo Performing Arts Center at the University of Notre Dame. In addition, the band has regularly played the region's premier venues for acoustic and folk music, such as LVD's Concert Hall in Goshen, Indiana; The Front Porch in Valparaiso, Indiana; the Acorn Theater in Three Oaks, Michigan; the Riviera Theater in Three Rivers, Michigan; Kraftbrau Brewery in Kalamazoo, Michigan; and the Schauer Arts and Activities Center in Hartford, Wisconsin.

== Music style and success ==
Instrumentation for Kennedy's Kitchen includes guitar, tin whistle, low D and other whistles, fiddle, mandolin, bouzouki, bodhran, bass guitar, harmonica, and tenor banjo.

Jigs, reels, aires, hornpipes, recitations, stories, and songs make up the band's traditional repertoire. Many of the recordings come from music sessions in Kennedy's home, where spontaneity is captured.

The band's first individual CD self-titled Kennedy’s Kitchen, was completed in 2003. It was selected by National Public Radio (NPR) Affiliate WVPE FM 881's: The Back Porch as one of the top 25 folk releases of 2003. Music in the Glen, produced in 2004, reflects the band's versatility; from John's self-written recitation by the same name to the lively reel, “Earl’s Chair Set”.

The band's third CD, A Pocketful of Lint, was produced in 2006 and specifically honored the immigration of band members' ancestors to Ellis Island. In a review of this album, the March 2007 Irish American News included praise for the band's ability to maintain the melody of ethnic music and include original compositions; similarly, Celtic MP3's Music Magazine commended the musical qualities of these selections, while the South Bend Tribune noted the "intricate" compositions.

In 2009, the band produced The Hotting Fire. In a commentary on this CD by Celtic Radio Network, joHn Kennedy's recitation, “The Crickets in the Hearth,” is cited as a wonderful story of his grandmother from Donegal in 1904. In the Irish American News' March 2013 review of the 2012 CD, The Birds Upon the Trees, it was noted that the CD is "by far the best they've done and it has something for everyone." Josh Curll of 67 Music stated of this CD: "Listening to this album is like watching a trad band in a pub." The band's 2019 release, The Whiskey of Truth, was noted by the South Bend Tribune for its stirring rendition of the classic Irish song, Danny Boy.

In summarizing the success of this band, the Irish American Heritage Center's website comments, “It’s Kitchen music. From the home, the hearth, and the heart.”

== Current members ==
- joHn Kennedy - Vocals, Guitar, and Bouzouki
- Mike Bill - Whistles and Flutes
- Chris O'Brien - Vocals, Fiddle, Mandolin, and Banjo
- Joel Cooper - Vocals and Bass
- Nancy Turner - Bodhran
- Jacob Turner - Bodhran
- Nathan Waddill - Bass

== Discography ==
- Kennedy's Kitchen (2003)
- Music in the Glen (2004)
- A Pocket Full of Lint (2006)
- The Hotting Fire (2009)
- The Birds Upon the Trees (2013)
- The Whiskey of Truth (2019)
