= South Bend Blue Sox =

- 1943–1954; South Bend, Indiana
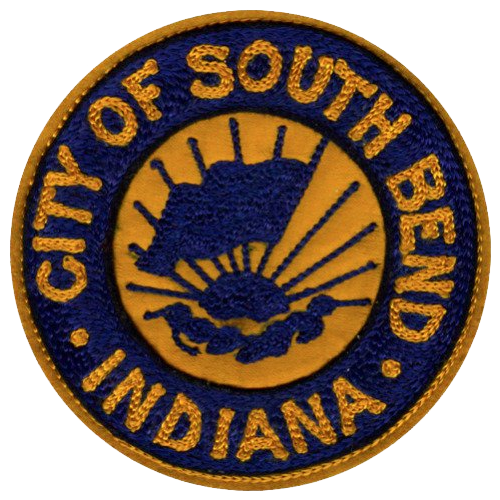
Team logo
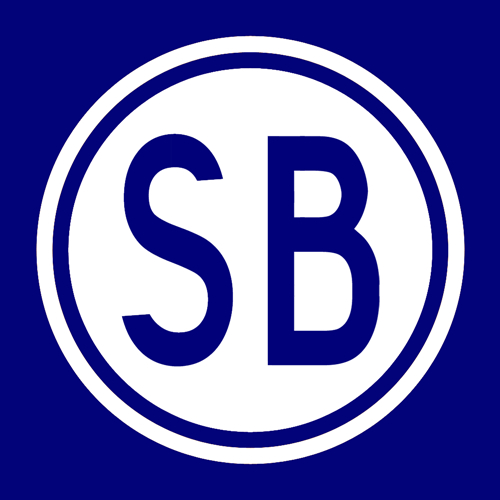
Cap insignia

Minor league affiliations
- Previous leagues: All-American Girls Professional Baseball League

Minor league titles
- League titles: 2 1951, 1952

Team data
- Colors: Blue, white
- Previous parks: Bendix Field (1943–1945); Playland Park (1946–1954)
- Owner/ Operator: AAGPBL

The South Bend Blue Sox was a women's professional baseball team who played from 1943 through 1954 in the All-American Girls Professional Baseball League (AAGPBL). A founding member, the team represented South Bend, Indiana, and played their home games at Bendix Field (1943–1945) and Playland Park (1946–1954).

== History ==
The Blue Sox were one of two teams to play in every AAGPBL season without relocating, the other being the Rockford Peaches. Often a second-division team, they appeared in six playoff series and won two league titles.

In the 1943 inaugural season, The Blue Sox finished in third place with a 51–40 mark, only .001 percentage point behind second place Kenosha Comets. Together, pitchers Margaret Berger and Doris Barr threw 79 of the 91 games played by the Sox. Berger was credited with 25 wins and Barr with 15, while Berger posted her greatest triumph in a 13–inning match, which she won 1–0.

1943 South Bend Blue Sox inaugural team Back row, L-R: Bert Niehoff (manager), Muriel Coben, Ellen Tronnier, Johanna Hageman, Geraldine Shafranis, Betty McFadden, Rose Virginia Way (chaperone). Middle row, L-R: Lois Florreich, Betsy Jochum, Josephine D'Angelo, Margaret Berger, Dorothy Schroeder, Mary Holda. Front row: Doris Barr, Mary Baker, Lucella MacLean, Margaret Stefani.

The next three years, South Bend finished 64–55 (1944), 49–60 (1945), 70–42 (1946), 57–54 (1947) and 57–59 (1948). After falling in their playoff intents, in the 1949 season the team posted the best record in the league (and in team history) with a 75–36 mark. That year they were swept in the playoffs, 4–to–0, by Rockford, after getting a first-round bye along with them. The South Bend club went on to win their next four playoffs in claiming back-to-back championship titles in 1951 and 1952. After that, the Blue Sox finished in last place both in the 1953 and 1954 seasons.

Apart from the aforementioned Barr and Berger, over time South Bend included talented players such as Mary Baker (C), Jean Faut (P), Betsy Jochum (OF/1B), Elizabeth Mahon (OF), Betty Whiting (IF), and Dottie Schroeder (SS), who played with four teams to become the only girl to play through the 12 years of existence of the circuit.

== All-time roster ==
Bold denotes members of the inaugural roster

- Fredda Acker
- Ellen Ahrndt
- Amy Irene Applegren
- Charlotte Armstrong
- Louise Arnold
- **Mary Baker**
- Phyllis Baker
- **Doris Barr**
- Mary Baumgartner
- **Catherine Bennett**
- **Margaret Berger**
- Nalda Bird
- Jaynne Bittner
- Audrey Bleiler
- **Ruth Born**
- Rita Briggs
- Wilma Briggs
- Delores Brumfield
- Arlene Buszka
- Marge Callaghan
- Janet Campbell
- Mary Carey
- Virginia Carver
- **Bea Chester**
- Dorothy Christ
- Louise Clapp
- **Muriel Coben**
- Donna Cook
- Doris Cook
- Peggy Cramer
- Idona Crigler
- Mary Dailey
- **Josephine D'Angelo**
- Gladys Davis
- Mona Denton
- Nancy DeShone
- Dorthia Downs
- Maxine Drinkwater
- Gertrude Dunn
- Loretta Dwojak
- Lillian Faralla
- Jean Faut
- Peggy Fenton
- Helen Filarski
- **Lois Florreich**
- Betty Francis
- Mary Froning
- Rose Gacioch
- Luisa Gallegos
- Gertrude Ganote
- Ann Garman
- Barbara Gates
- Mary Lou Graham
- **Johanna Hageman**
- Josephine Hasham
- Martha Hayslip
- Esther Ann Hershey
- Joyce Hill
- Barbara Hoffman
- **Mary Holda**
- **Mabel Holle**
- **Marjorie Hood**
- Marion Hosbein
- Janet Jamieson
- Loretta Janowski
- Frances Janssen
- **Betsy Jochum**
- Doris Jones
- Daisy Junor
- Jacquelyn Kelley
- Beatrice Kemmerer
- Lavina Keough
- Evelyn Keppel
- Erma Keyes
- Glenna Sue Kidd
- Shirley Kleinhans
- Dolores Klosowski
- Phyllis Koehn
- Arlene Kotil
- Jaynie Krick
- Marie Kruckel
- Anna Kunkel
- **Margie Lang**
- Josephine Lenard
- Mary Louise Lester
- Lillian Luckey
- Betty Luna
- Esther Lyman
- Judy McCormick
- **Betty Jean McFadden**
- **Lucella MacLean**
- Elizabeth Mahon
- Marie Mahoney
- Lenora Mandella
- Theda Marshall
- Joan Martin
- Joan Matuzewski
- Bernice Metesch
- Norma Metrolis
- Alice Meyer
- Darlene Mickelsen
- Rose Montalbano
- Helen Moore
- Lucille Moore
- Mary Moore
- Dolores Mueller
- Dorothy Mueller
- Dorothy Naum
- Helen Nordquist
- Donna Norris
- Joanne Ogden
- Vickie Panos
- Marguerite Pearson
- Joy Perkins
- Pauline Pirok
- Charlene Pryer
- Jenny Romatowski
- Elaine Roth
- Janet Rumsey
- Shirley Salisbury
- Dorothy Sarazen
- **Dorothy Sawyer**
- Violet Schmidt
- **Dorothy Schroeder**
- Audrey Seitzinger
- **Geraldine Shafranis**
- Lois Sheffield
- Amy Shuman
- Dorothy Smith
- Kay Sopkovic
- **Margaret Stefani**
- Ruby Stephens
- Jane Stoll
- Lucille Stone
- Shirley Stovroff
- Anne Surkowski
- Lee Surkowski
- Viola Thompson
- Betty Trezza
- **Ellen Tronnier**
- Dolly Vanderlip
- Georgette Vincent
- Inez Voyce
- Betty Wagoner
- Betty Wanless
- **Rose Virginia Way**
- Margaret Wenzell
- Dorothy Whalen
- Betty Whiting
- Norma Whitney
- Janet Wiley
- Ruth Williams
- **Jean Wilson**
- Senaida Wirth
- Renae Youngberg
- Lois Youngen

== Managers ==
- Bert Niehoff, 1943–1944
- Marty McManus, 1945
- Chet Grant, 1946–1947
- Marty McManus, 1948
- Dave Bancroft, 1948–1950
- Karl Winsch, 1951–1954

== Sources ==
- All-American Girls Professional Baseball League Record Book – W. C. Madden. Publisher: McFarland & Company. Format: Paperback, 294pp. Language: English. ISBN 0-7864-3747-2. ISBN 978-0-7864-3747-4
