= Bonnie Baker (baseball) =

Canadian baseball player (1918–2003)

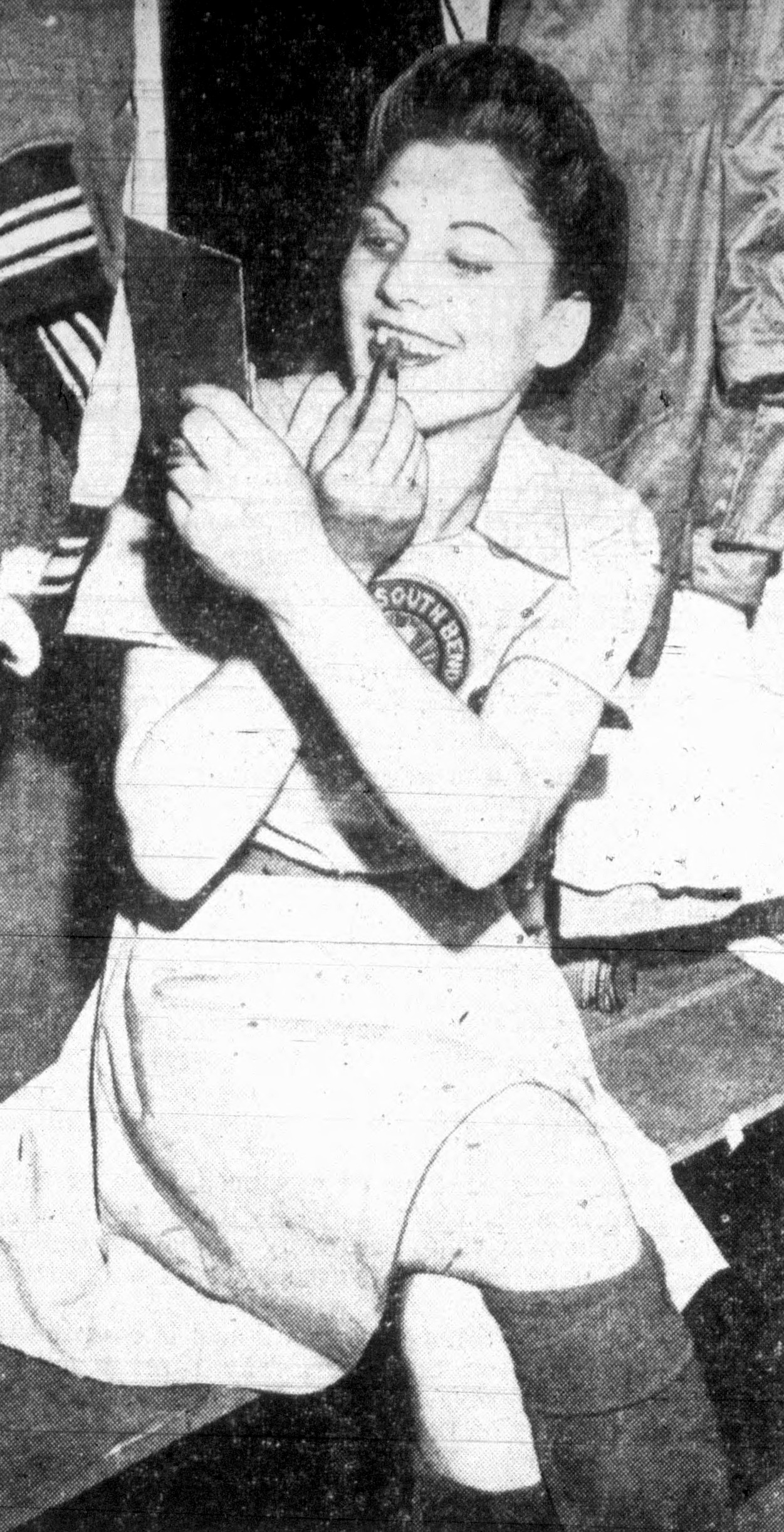
- Baker in 1943
- Catcher / Infield Utility
- Born: July 10, 1918; Regina, Saskatchewan, Canada
- Died: December 17, 2003 (aged 85); Regina, Saskatchewan, Canada
- Batted: Right Threw: Right

Teams
- South Bend Blue Sox (1943–1950); Kalamazoo Lassies (1950, 1952)

Career highlights and awards
- Women in Baseball – AAGPBL Permanent Display at Baseball Hall of Fame and Museum (1988)

Mary Geraldine (Bonnie) Baker, née George (July 10, 1918 – December 17, 2003) was a Canadian all-star baseball catcher in the All-American Girls Professional Baseball League (AAGPBL) from 1943 to 1952.

== Career ==
With the majority of major-league baseball players in the military during World War II, Phil Wrigley, owner of the Chicago Cubs, established the AAGPBL in 1943, and the league continued until 1954. The first year the league played by softball rules, but that gradually changed until it was nearly identical with professional baseball.

Baker began her career with the South Bend Blue Sox in the league's first season and stayed with the team until 1950. All of Baker's eight brothers and sisters were baseball catchers, so it stood to reason that she would become one too. She was discovered by professional scout Hub Bishop who would later also discover notable Saskatchewan athletes like Gordie Howe of the Detroit Red Wings. She was one of 68 Canadian players in the AAGPBL, while her sister, Genevieve George, also played in the league for the Kalamazoo Lassies. When Baker joined the AAGPBL, she initially had promised her husband, who was fighting overseas in World War II, that she would quit the game when he returned.

Baker had also been a former model and was often chosen by the league to pose for publicity shots and act as a league spokesperson. She was the league's most publicized player and was referred to as "Pretty Bonnie Baker" by the press. She appeared on the popular television show What's My Line? on August 17, 1952, and her picture also appeared in Life magazine. Although she was easily the most recognized AAGPBL player, it never stopped her from doing her job. She was an all-star in 1943 and 1946 and played 930 games in her career. She hit .235 for her career, with 1 home run, 244 RBI and 465 runs. Her career fielding average was .953. In 1946, Baker had an all-star season, stealing a league-leading 94 bases and batting .286 with a .965 fielding percentage.

During the 1950 season, Baker was traded to the Kalamazoo Lassies to act as a player-manager, becoming the only woman in league history to do so. The struggling Lassies placed last in the league with a 36–73 record. The following year the league passed a rule banning female managers. Baker skipped the 1951 season to have a daughter, Maureen (aka "Chickie"), but returned to the Lassies for one year in 1952.

She later returned to Saskatchewan, where she led the Regina Legion softball team to the World Ladies Softball title. In 1964-65 she worked for the Regina radio station CKRM, as the first female sports broadcaster in Canada. She also managed the Wheat City Curling Club for 25 years.

== Death and honours ==
Baker died of respiratory failure at the age of 85. Fellow AAGPBL player Arleene Noga remembers her as "a complete player with all five tools — a real competitor." In 1998 she was inducted into the Canadian Baseball Hall of Fame. She is also a member of the Saskatchewan Sports Hall of Fame and the Saskatchewan Baseball Hall of Fame, and is part of the special exhibit on the AAGPBL in the Baseball Hall of Fame in Cooperstown, New York.

The 1992 Geena Davis–Tom Hanks movie A League of Their Own was a fictional account of the AAGPBL. Davis's character, Dottie Hinson, is loosely based on her, playing catcher like she did in the league, and her sister also played in the AAGPBL, similar to the sister relationship depicted in the film.

In 2018, Baker was posthumously awarded the Order of Sport, marking her induction into Canada's Sports Hall of Fame.

In 2023, a Heritage Minute was created about her.
