= Esther Lyman =

American baseball player (1927–1991)

- Catcher
- Born: May 18, 1927; Peoria, Illinois, U.S.
- Died: May 25, 1991 (aged 64); Decatur, Illinois, U.S.
- Batted: Right Threw: Right

Teams
- South Bend Blue Sox (1946)

Esther Lyman (later Kelly; May 18, 1927 – May 25, 1991) was a catcher who played in the All-American Girls Professional Baseball League (AAGPBL). She batted and threw right handed.

Born in Peoria, Illinois, Esther Lyman joined the American Baseball League in its 1946 season. She was assigned to the South Bend Blue Sox club. Additional information is incomplete because there are no records available at the time of the request.

Afterwards, Esther worked as a youth bowling instructor for several years in Decatur, Illinois. In addition, she formed part of the American Softball Association Committee, the Decatur Women Bowlers Association, and the Illinois State Softball Hall of Fame. She was married to George R. Kelly in 1949, and they raised one daughter and two sons Chris, Gary, and John. She has four granddaughters Patti, Katie, Blair and Sloan and one grandson Mike.

Esther Lyman died in 1991 in Decatur, Illinois, one week after her 64th birthday. In 1988, a permanent display at the Baseball Hall of Fame and Museum at Cooperstown, New York was established, honoring those who were part of the All-American Girls Professional Baseball League. Esther Lyman, along with the rest of the girls and the league staff, is included at the display/exhibit.
