= Dorthia Downs =

American baseball player

- First base / Right field
- Born: December 10, 1917; South Bend, Indiana, US
- Died: February 11, 1968 (aged 50); South Bend, Indiana, US
- Batted: Right Threw: Right

Teams
- South Bend Blue Sox (1945)

Career highlights and awards
- Women in Baseball – AAGPBL Permanent Display at the Baseball Hall of Fame and Museum (unveiled in 1988)

Dorthia M. "Dottie" Downs (December 10, 1917 – February 11, 1968) was an All-American Girls Professional Baseball League player.

Downs was born in South Bend, Indiana, to Ershel and Hilda Downs. Downs joined her home club South Bend Blue Sox in its 1945 season. She appeared in three games and went hitless in five at bats. Additional information is incomplete because there are no records available at the time of the request.

Downs died at age 50, unmarried.

In 1988, 20 years after her death, she was honored with a permanent display at the Baseball Hall of Fame and Museum at Cooperstown, New York. The display honors those who were part of the All-American Girls Professional Baseball League. Dorthia Downs, along with the rest of the girls and the league staff, is included at the display/exhibit.
