= Jasmine Watson =

American basketball player

Personal information
- Born: June 4, 1991 (age 35)
- Listed height: 6 ft 3 in (1.91 m)

Career information
- High school: Washington High School
- College: Massachusetts (2009–13)
- Position: Center

Jasmine Watson (born June 4, 1991, in South Bend, Indiana) plays center for the UMass women's basketball team. She was named the 2010 Atlantic 10 Rookie of the Year and was selected to the 2010 Atlantic 10 All-Rookie Team. Jasmine plays overseas she average 9.3 pt 9.1 rebounds. She also trains with an organization called MAM.

== Massachusetts statistics ==
Ratios
Year	Team	GP	FG%	3P%	FT%	RBG	APG	BPG	SPG	PPG
2009-10	Massachusetts	30	43.9%	-	72.6%	5.87	0.87	1.27	0.90	10.23
2010-11	Massachusetts	22	44.6%	33.3%	78.5%	7.64	1.73	1.68	0.86	14.41
2011-12	Massachusetts	29	49.0%	-	63.2%	7.35	1.24	1.66	1.14	12.28
2012-13	Massachusetts	28	50.2%	-	63.1%	6.21	1.14	1.86	1.00	11.11
Career		109	47.0%	16.7%	70.0%	6.71	1.21	1.61	0.98	11.84

Totals
Year	Team	GP	FG	FGA	3P	3PA	FT	FTA	REB	A	BK	ST	PTS
2009-10	Massachusetts	30	115	262	0	0	77	106	176	26	38	27	307
2010-11	Massachusetts	22	107	240	1	3	102	130	168	38	37	19	317
2011-12	Massachusetts	29	141	288	0	2	74	117	213	36	48	33	356
2012-13	Massachusetts	28	129	257	0	1	53	84	174	32	52	28	311
Career		109	492	1047	1	6	306	437	731	132	175	107	1291
