= Chet Grant =

American football player, coach, and sportswriter (1892–1985)

Biographical details
- Born: February 22, 1892; Defiance, Ohio, U.S.
- Died: July 1985 (aged 93); South Bend, Indiana, U.S.

Playing career
- 1920–1921: Notre Dame
- Position(s): Quarterback

Coaching career (HC unless noted)
- 1934–1940: Notre Dame (assistant)

Donald Chester Grant (February 22, 1892 – July 1985) was an American football player, coach, and sportswriter.

At a young age, Chet Grant took an active interest in South Bend athletics, particularly Notre Dame football, and at the age of eighteen, he became the sports editor for the South Bend Tribune. Ten years later, he enrolled at the University of Notre Dame where he played forward for the basketball team and, in his late twenties, became the backup quarterback for Knute Rockne's football squad in 1920—the same year the legendary George Gipp died of complications from pneumonia. Under Grant's direction as the starting quarterback the following year, the team amassed a record of 10–1, with their only loss at undefeated Iowa.

Years later, Grant would return to coach the backfield for Elmer Layden's team from 1934 to 1940 and eventually would become a curator for the sports collections at the Notre Dame Archives. Besides this, he managed from 1946 through 1947 in the All-American Girls Professional Baseball League for the South Bend Blue Sox, leading his team to a collective 127–96 record and two consecutive playoff appearances. He returned to manage the Kenosha Comets in 1948, ending fourth in the five-team Western Division with a 62–64 mark.

== Bibliography ==
- Before Rockne at Notre Dame (1978), (ISBN 0-89651-050-6)
