= Milt Jordan =

American baseball player (1927–1993)

- Pitcher
- Born: May 24, 1927; Clearfield County, Pennsylvania, U.S.
- Died: May 13, 1993 (aged 65); Ithaca, New York, U.S.
- Batted: Right Threw: Right

MLB debut
- April 16, 1953, for the Detroit Tigers

Last MLB appearance
- May 10, 1953, for the Detroit Tigers

MLB statistics
- Win–loss record: 0–1
- Earned run average: 5.82
- Innings pitched: 17
- Stats at Baseball Reference

Teams
- Detroit Tigers (1953)

Milton Mignot Jordan (May 24, 1927 – May 13, 1993) was an American professional baseball player, a 6 ft 2 in (1.88 m), 207 lb (94 kg) right-handed pitcher who appeared in eight Major League games for the 1953 Detroit Tigers. He was born in Mineral Springs, Clearfield County, Pennsylvania, and served in the United States Army Air Forces during World War II.

Jordan's nine-season (1948–1956) career was spent entirely in the Tiger organization. His Major League trial came at the outset of the 1953 campaign. After two scoreless appearances as a relief pitcher, Jordan was given his only MLB starting assignment by manager Fred Hutchinson on April 22 against the Chicago White Sox at Briggs Stadium. In the second inning he surrendered three runs but went on to last seven full innings, giving up six runs, all earned and 12 hits, including home runs by Chicago's Sam Mele, Sherm Lollar and Vern Stephens. He departed with the Tigers trailing 6–1, and absorbed the loss in an eventual 9–7 defeat. It was his only Major League decision. In 17 innings, he allowed 26 hits, 11 earned runs and five bases on balls, with four strikeouts.

In 1953, Jordan won 12, lost only once, and compiled a 3.11 earned run average for the Triple-A Buffalo Bisons of the International League, mostly working as a relief pitcher.
