= Helen Filarski =

American baseball player (1924–2014)

- Third base / Second base / Outfield
- Born: May 11, 1924; Detroit, Michigan, U.S.
- Died: September 13, 2014 (aged 90); Harper Woods, Michigan, U.S.
- Batted: Right Threw: Right

Teams
- Rockford Peaches (1945–1946); Peoria Redwings (1947); Kenosha Comets (1947); South Bend Blue Sox (1948–1950)

Career highlights and awards
- Best season fielding average at third base (1946); Championship Team (1945); Four postseason appearances (1945–1946, 1948–1949); Women in Baseball – AAGPBL Permanent Display at Baseball Hall of Fame and Museum (1988)

Helen Filarski (later Steffes; May 11, 1924 – September 13, 2014) was an American baseball player. She was an infielder and outfielder who played from 1945 through 1950 in the All-American Girls Professional Baseball League (AAGPBL). Listed at 5 ft 2 in (157 cm), 125 lb (57 kg), she batted and threw right-handed.

== Career ==
Nicknamed "Fil", Helen played on a championship team and won a season title as the best defensive third base during her six years in the league. Basically a line drive hitter, she was able to be patient and swing at good pitches at the same time, as evidenced by her .309 career on-base percentage and her 1.81 walk-to-strikeout ratio. After her playing days, she coached hundreds of girls for more than 40 years.

Born in Detroit, Michigan, Filarski aspired to become a professional athlete. She was supported by her mother, who never had the chance to play sports because girls were not supposed to be too physical. After graduating at high school Helen went to work for the Briggs Manufacturing Company on the B-29 wings. In her spare time she played amateur baseball around the playgrounds of Detroit, starting at shortstop, and then switched to second base, before finally settling in at third base.

During a local tournament Filarski was invited to a tryout for the All-American Girls Professional Baseball League in Chicago, Illinois. She made the trip and accepted an offer contract because the money was so much better than she could make in the factory.

Filarski entered the league in 1945 with the Rockford Peaches, playing for them two years before joining the Peoria Redwings (1947), Kenosha Comets (1947) and South Bend Blue Sox (1948–1950).

In her rookie season for the Peaches she helped them win the Championship Title that year. Her biggest contribution during the postseason came in the final best-of-seven series, against the Fort Wayne Daisies, when she scored two decisive runs and led her team with three runs batted in, though in the series she got knocked out and lost her two front teeth after a frightening collision with a base runner.

In 1946, Filarski was the best defensive player at third base with a .932 fielding average. Her most productive season as a hitter came in her last year, when she posted career numbers in batting average (.209), extrabases (12) and on-base percentage (.314). Eventually, she also traveled to San Juan, Puerto Rico for a baseball tournament.

Filarski did not return to the league after marrying Donald Steffes in 1951. The couple raised six children, four boys and two girls. She continued to be active in sports by coaching her children's teams, and also coached a softball team in Mount Clemens, Michigan for 30 years, extending her coaching knowledge into the early 2000s. In addition, her hobby activities included photography and playing basketball and bowling.

In 1988, Filarski became part of Women in Baseball, a permanent display based at the Baseball Hall of Fame and Museum in Cooperstown, New York, which was unveiled to honor the entire All-American Girls Professional Baseball League.

Filarski died on September 13, 2014, in Harper Woods, Michigan, at the age of 90.

== Career statistics ==
Batting

GP	AB	R	H	2B	3B	HR	RBI	SB	TB	BB	SO	BA	OBP	SLG	OPS
534	1683	189	318	25	15	1	141	115	376	248	137	.189	.293	.223	.517

Fielding

GP	PO	A	E	TC	DP	FA
513	866	1224	300	2390	99	.874
