= 1926 Philadelphia Phillies season =

Major League Baseball season

1926 Philadelphia Phillies
- League: National League
- Ballpark: Baker Bowl
- City: Philadelphia, Pennsylvania
- Owners: William Baker
- Managers: Connor Shears

The 1926 Philadelphia Phillies season was a season in Major League Baseball. The Phillies finished eighth in the National League with a record of 58 wins and 93 losses. Manager Connor Shears was fired following the season due to the team's performance as well as several documented incidents involving alcohol and relationships with female hotel employees while on road trips.

== Regular season ==
=== Season standings ===
National League
Team	W	L	Pct.	GB	Home	Road
St. Louis Cardinals	89	65	.578	—	47‍–‍30	42‍–‍35
Cincinnati Reds	87	67	.565	2	53‍–‍23	34‍–‍44
Pittsburgh Pirates	84	69	.549	4½	49‍–‍28	35‍–‍41
Chicago Cubs	82	72	.532	7	49‍–‍28	33‍–‍44
New York Giants	74	77	.490	13½	43‍–‍33	31‍–‍44
Brooklyn Robins	71	82	.464	17½	38‍–‍38	33‍–‍44
Boston Braves	66	86	.434	22	43‍–‍34	23‍–‍52
Philadelphia Phillies	58	93	.384	29½	33‍–‍42	25‍–‍51

=== Record vs. opponents ===
1926 National League record Sources:
Team	BSN	BRO	CHC	CIN	NYG	PHI	PIT	STL
Boston	—	6–15	12–10	12–10–1	12–10	7–15	10–11	7–15
Brooklyn	15–6	—	14–8	4–18	9–13	13–9	9–13–2	7–15
Chicago	10–12	8–14	—	13–9–1	14–8	16–6	10–12	11–11
Cincinnati	10–12–1	18–4	9–13–1	—	7–15	16–6–1	13–9	14–8
New York	10–12	13–9	8–14	15–7	—	12–7	6–16	10–12
Philadelphia	15–7	9–13	6–16	6–16–1	7–12	—	8–14	7–15
Pittsburgh	11–10	13–9–2	12–10	9–13	16–6	14–8	—	9–13–2
St. Louis	15–7	15–7	11–11	8–14	12–10	15–7	13–9–2	—

=== Roster ===
1926 Philadelphia Phillies
Roster
Pitchers: Ed Baecht; Hal Carlson; Wayland Dean; Art Decatur; Mike Kelly; Jack Knight; Clarence Mitchell; Ray Pierce; Pete Rambo; Lefty Taber; Dutch Ulrich	Catchers: Butch Henline; Bubber Jonnard; Lew Wendell; Jimmie Wilson; Infielders: Dick Attreau; Jack Bentley; Joe Buskey; Ed Cotter; Lee Dunham; Bernie Friberg; Ray Grimes; Clarence Huber; Chick Keating; Wally Kimmick; Bob Rice; Heinie Sand; George Stutz; Russ Wrightstone	Outfielders: George Harper; Freddy Leach; Johnny Mokan; Al Nixon; Denny Sothern; Cy Williams	Manager: Art Fletcher; Coaches: Benny Meyer; Joe Sugden

== Player stats ==
=== Batting ===
==== Starters by position ====
Note: Pos = Position; G = Games played; AB = At bats; H = Hits; Avg. = Batting average; HR = Home runs; RBI = Runs batted in

Pos	Player	G	AB	H	Avg.	HR	RBI
C	Jimmie Wilson	90	279	85	.305	4	32
1B	Jack Bentley	75	240	62	.258	2	27
2B	Bernie Friberg	144	478	128	.268	1	51
SS	Heinie Sand	149	567	154	.272	4	37
3B	Clarence Huber	118	376	92	.245	1	34
OF	Freddy Leach	129	492	162	.329	11	71
OF	Cy Williams	107	336	116	.345	18	53
OF	Johnny Mokan	127	456	138	.303	6	62

==== Other batters ====
Note: G = Games played; AB = At bats; H = Hits; Avg. = Batting average; HR = Home runs; RBI = Runs batted in

Player	G	AB	H	Avg.	HR	RBI
Russ Wrightstone	112	368	113	.307	7	57
Al Nixon	93	311	91	.293	4	41
Butch Henline	99	283	80	.283	2	30
George Harper	56	194	61	.314	7	38
Ray Grimes	32	101	30	.297	0	15
Dick Attreau	17	61	14	.230	0	5
Bob Rice	19	54	8	.148	0	10
Denny Sothern	14	53	13	.245	3	10
Bubber Jonnard	19	34	4	.118	0	2
Wally Kimmick	20	28	6	.214	0	2
Ed Cotter	17	26	8	.308	0	1
George Stutz	6	9	0	.000	0	0
Joe Buskey	5	8	0	.000	0	0
Lee Dunham	5	4	1	.250	0	1
Lew Wendell	1	4	0	.000	0	0
Chick Keating	4	2	0	.000	0	0

=== Pitching ===
==== Starting pitchers ====
Note: G = Games pitched; IP = Innings pitched; W = Wins; L = Losses; ERA = Earned run average; SO = Strikeouts

Player	G	IP	W	L	ERA	SO
Hal Carlson	35	267.1	17	12	3.23	55
Wayland Dean	33	203.2	8	16	4.91	52
Clarence Mitchell	28	178.2	9	14	4.58	52

==== Other pitchers ====
Note: G = Games pitched; IP = Innings pitched; W = Wins; L = Losses; ERA = Earned run average; SO = Strikeouts

Player	G	IP	W	L	ERA	SO
Claude Willoughby	47	168.0	8	12	5.95	37
Dutch Ulrich	45	147.2	8	13	4.08	52
Jack Knight	35	142.2	3	12	6.62	29
Ray Pierce	37	84.2	2	7	5.63	18
Ernie Maun	14	37.2	1	4	6.45	9
Jack Bentley	7	25.1	0	2	8.17	7
Art Decatur	2	3.0	0	0	6.00	0

==== Relief pitchers ====
Note: G = Games pitched; W = Wins; L = Losses; SV = Saves; ERA = Earned run average; SO = Strikeouts

Player	G	W	L	SV	ERA	SO
Ed Baecht	28	2	0	0	6.11	14
Lefty Taber	6	0	0	0	7.56	0
Mike Kelly	4	0	0	0	9.45	2
Pete Rambo	1	0	0	0	14.73	4
Rusty Yarnall	1	0	1	0	18.00	0
