= 1926 Chicago Cubs season =

1926 Chicago Cubs
- League: National League
- Ballpark: Cubs Park
- City: Chicago
- Record: 82–72 (.532)
- League place: 4th
- Owners: William Wrigley Jr.
- Managers: Joe McCarthy
- Radio: WGN (Quin Ryan); WMAQ (Hal Totten)

The 1926 Chicago Cubs season was the 55th season of the Chicago Cubs franchise, the 51st in the National League (NL) and the 11th at Wrigley Field (the last in which the venue was officially called "Cubs Park"). The Cubs finished fourth in the National League with a record of 82–72.

The 1926 Cubs allowed a defensive stolen base percentage of 31.75%, the lowest mark for any team in a single season in MLB history.

== Regular season ==
=== Season standings ===
National League
Team	W	L	Pct.	GB	Home	Road
St. Louis Cardinals	89	65	.578	—	47‍–‍30	42‍–‍35
Cincinnati Reds	87	67	.565	2	53‍–‍23	34‍–‍44
Pittsburgh Pirates	84	69	.549	4½	49‍–‍28	35‍–‍41
Chicago Cubs	82	72	.532	7	49‍–‍28	33‍–‍44
New York Giants	74	77	.490	13½	43‍–‍33	31‍–‍44
Brooklyn Robins	71	82	.464	17½	38‍–‍38	33‍–‍44
Boston Braves	66	86	.434	22	43‍–‍34	23‍–‍52
Philadelphia Phillies	58	93	.384	29½	33‍–‍42	25‍–‍51

=== Record vs. opponents ===
1926 National League record Sources:
Team	BSN	BRO	CHC	CIN	NYG	PHI	PIT	STL
Boston	—	6–15	12–10	12–10–1	12–10	7–15	10–11	7–15
Brooklyn	15–6	—	14–8	4–18	9–13	13–9	9–13–2	7–15
Chicago	10–12	8–14	—	13–9–1	14–8	16–6	10–12	11–11
Cincinnati	10–12–1	18–4	9–13–1	—	7–15	16–6–1	13–9	14–8
New York	10–12	13–9	8–14	15–7	—	12–7	6–16	10–12
Philadelphia	15–7	9–13	6–16	6–16–1	7–12	—	8–14	7–15
Pittsburgh	11–10	13–9–2	12–10	9–13	16–6	14–8	—	9–13–2
St. Louis	15–7	15–7	11–11	8–14	12–10	15–7	13–9–2	—

=== Roster ===
1926 Chicago Cubs
Roster
Pitchers: Pete Alexander; Sheriff Blake; Guy Bush; Wilbur Cooper; Walt Huntzinger; Percy Jones; Tony Kaufmann; George Milstead; Bob Osborn; Bill Piercy; Charlie Root; Johnny Welch	Catchers: John Churry; Mike González; Gabby Hartnett; Infielders: Sparky Adams; Clyde Beck; Jimmy Cooney; Howard Freigau; Joe Graves; Charlie Grimm; Hank Schreiber; Red Shannon; Chick Tolson	Outfielders: Mandy Brooks; Cliff Heathcote; Joe Kelly; Joe Munson; Pete Scott; Riggs Stephenson; Hack Wilson; Other batters: Ralph Michaels	Manager: Joe McCarthy; Coaches: Jimmy Burke; Mickey Doolan

== Player stats ==
=== Batting ===
==== Starters by position ====
Note: Pos = Position; G = Games played; AB = At bats; H = Hits; Avg. = Batting average; HR = Home runs; RBI = Runs batted in

Pos	Player	G	AB	H	Avg.	HR	RBI
C	Gabby Hartnett	93	284	78	.275	8	41
1B	Charlie Grimm	147	524	145	.277	8	82
2B	Sparky Adams	154	624	193	.309	0	39
SS	Jimmy Cooney	141	513	129	.251	1	47
3B	Howard Freigau	140	508	137	.270	3	51
OF	Riggs Stephenson	82	281	95	.338	3	44
OF	Cliff Heathcote	139	510	141	.276	10	53
OF	Hack Wilson	142	529	170	.321	21	109

==== Other batters ====
Note: G = Games played; AB = At bats; H = Hits; Avg. = Batting average; HR = Home runs; RBI = Runs batted in

Player	G	AB	H	Avg.	HR	RBI
Mike González	80	253	63	.249	1	23
Pete Scott	77	189	54	.286	3	34
Joe Kelly	65	176	59	.335	0	32
Joe Munson	33	101	26	.257	3	15
Clyde Beck	30	81	16	.198	1	4
Chick Tolson	57	80	25	.313	1	8
Red Shannon	19	51	17	.333	0	4
Mandy Brooks	26	48	9	.188	1	6
Hank Schreiber	10	18	1	.056	0	0
Joe Graves	2	5	0	.000	0	0
John Churry	2	4	0	.000	0	0
Ralph Michaels	2	0	0	----	0	0

=== Pitching ===
==== Starting pitchers ====
Note: G = Games pitched; IP = Innings pitched; W = Wins; L = Losses; ERA = Earned run average; SO = Strikeouts

Player	G	IP	W	L	ERA	SO
Charlie Root	42	271.1	18	17	2.82	127
Sheriff Blake	39	197.2	11	12	3.60	95
Tony Kaufmann	26	169.2	9	7	3.02	52
Percy Jones	30	160.1	12	7	3.09	80
Wilbur Cooper	8	55.0	2	1	4.42	18
Pete Alexander	7	52.0	3	3	3.46	12

==== Other pitchers ====
Note: G = Games pitched; IP = Innings pitched; W = Wins; L = Losses; ERA = Earned run average; SO = Strikeouts

Player	G	IP	W	L	ERA	SO
Guy Bush	35	157.1	13	9	2.86	32
Bob Osborn	31	136.1	6	5	3.63	43
Bill Piercy	19	90.1	6	5	4.48	31
George Milstead	18	55.1	1	5	3.58	14

==== Relief pitchers ====
Note: G = Games pitched; W = Wins; L = Losses; SV = Saves; ERA = Earned run average; SO = Strikeouts

Player	G	W	L	SV	ERA	SO
Walt Huntzinger	11	1	1	2	0.94	4
Johnny Welch	3	0	0	0	2.08	0

== Farm system ==
Level	Team	League	Manager
AA	Los Angeles Angels	Pacific Coast League	Marty Krug

LEAGUE CHAMPIONS: Los Angeles
