= 1926 Brooklyn Robins season =

1926 Brooklyn Robins
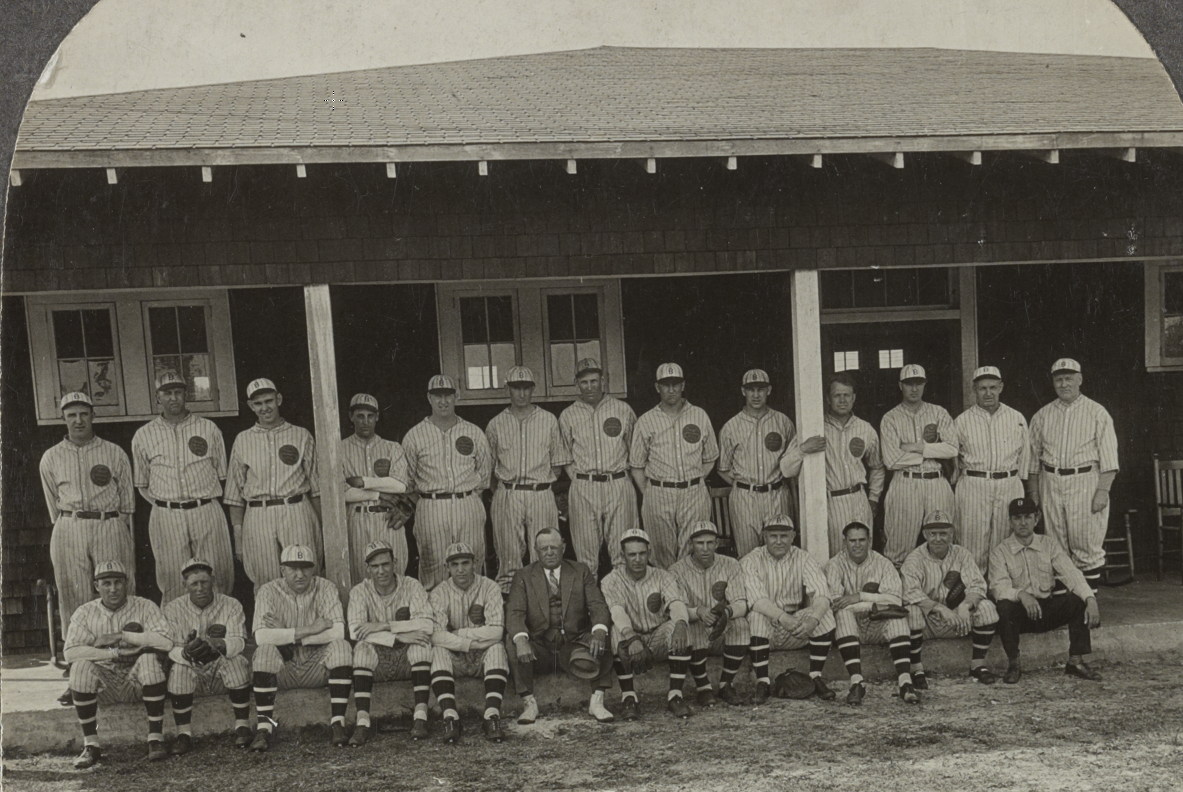
- Spring training photo of the team
- League: National League
- Ballpark: Ebbets Field
- City: Brooklyn, New York
- Record: 71–82 (.464)
- League place: 6th
- Owners: Stephen McKeever, Brooklyn Trust Company
- President: Wilbert Robinson
- Managers: Wilbert Robinson

The 1926 Brooklyn Robins season was the 18th and final season for long–time team star Zack Wheat.

== Offseason ==
- October 6, 1925: Zack Taylor, Jimmy Johnston and Eddie Brown were traded by the Robins to the Boston Braves for Jesse Barnes, Mickey O'Neil and Gus Felix.
- January 1926: Chick Fewster was purchased by the Robins from the Cleveland Indians.

== Regular season ==
=== Season standings ===
National League
Team	W	L	Pct.	GB	Home	Road
St. Louis Cardinals	89	65	.578	—	47‍–‍30	42‍–‍35
Cincinnati Reds	87	67	.565	2	53‍–‍23	34‍–‍44
Pittsburgh Pirates	84	69	.549	4½	49‍–‍28	35‍–‍41
Chicago Cubs	82	72	.532	7	49‍–‍28	33‍–‍44
New York Giants	74	77	.490	13½	43‍–‍33	31‍–‍44
Brooklyn Robins	71	82	.464	17½	38‍–‍38	33‍–‍44
Boston Braves	66	86	.434	22	43‍–‍34	23‍–‍52
Philadelphia Phillies	58	93	.384	29½	33‍–‍42	25‍–‍51

=== Record vs. opponents ===
1926 National League record Sources:
Team	BSN	BRO	CHC	CIN	NYG	PHI	PIT	STL
Boston	—	6–15	12–10	12–10–1	12–10	7–15	10–11	7–15
Brooklyn	15–6	—	14–8	4–18	9–13	13–9	9–13–2	7–15
Chicago	10–12	8–14	—	13–9–1	14–8	16–6	10–12	11–11
Cincinnati	10–12–1	18–4	9–13–1	—	7–15	16–6–1	13–9	14–8
New York	10–12	13–9	8–14	15–7	—	12–7	6–16	10–12
Philadelphia	15–7	9–13	6–16	6–16–1	7–12	—	8–14	7–15
Pittsburgh	11–10	13–9–2	12–10	9–13	16–6	14–8	—	9–13–2
St. Louis	15–7	15–7	11–11	8–14	12–10	15–7	13–9–2	—

=== Game log ===
Legend
	Dodgers win
	Dodgers loss
	Postponement
**Bold**	Dodgers team member

1926 Game Log
April (13–13)

#	Date	Opponent	Score	Win	Loss	Save	Attendance	Record
1	April 13	New Yorks Giants	3–0	Petty			45,000	
2	April 14	New Yorks Giants	5–9	Ring				
3	April 16	New Yorks Giants	2–3	Scott				
4	April 17	Phillies	3–15	Mitchell			10,000	
5	April 18	Phillies	2–1	Petty			25,000	
6	April 19	Phillies		McGraw			2,000	
7	April 22	New Yorks Giants					26,000	
8	April 23	New Yorks Giants					7,000	
9	April 24	New Yorks Giants	2–1					
10	April 25	New Yorks Giants		8–6			20,000	
11	April 27		6–5					
12	April 28		5–4					
13	April 28		3–1					
14	April 30		8–4					

May (12–16)

#	Date	Opponent	Score	Win	Loss	Save	Attendance	Record
15	May 1	Phillies						
16	May 2	Boston Braves						
17	May 3	Boston Braves						
18	May 4	Boston Braves						
19	May 6							

=== Notable transactions ===
- June 15, 1926: Sam Bohne was purchased by the Robins from the Cincinnati Reds.

=== Roster ===
1926 Brooklyn Robins
**Roster**
**Pitchers**: Jesse Barnes; George Boehler; Rube Ehrhardt; Burleigh Grimes; Bob McGraw; Doug McWeeny; Ray Moss; Jesse Petty; Dutch Stryker; Dazzy Vance; Leon Williams	**Catchers**: Hank DeBerry; Charlie Hargreaves; Mickey O'Neil; **Infielders**: Sam Bohne; Johnny Butler; Snooks Dowd; Chick Fewster; Jack Fournier; Babe Herman; Rabbit Maranville; William Marriott; Jerry Standaert; Milt Stock	**Outfielders**: Max Carey; Moose Clabaugh; Dick Cox; Gus Felix; Merwin Jacobson; Zack Wheat; Whitey Witt	**Manager**: Wilbert Robinson; **Coaches**: Joe Kelley; Joe McGinnity; Otto Miller

== Player stats ==
=== Batting ===
==== Starters by position ====
Note: Pos = Position; G = Games played; AB = At bats; H = Hits; Avg. = Batting average; HR = Home runs; RBI = Runs batted in

Pos	Player	G	AB	H	Avg.	HR	RBI
C	Mickey O'Neil	75	201	42	.209	0	20
1B	Babe Herman	137	496	158	.319	11	81
2B	Chick Fewster	105	337	82	.243	2	24
3B	William Marriott	109	360	96	.267	3	42
SS	Johnny Butler	147	501	135	.269	1	68
OF	Zack Wheat	111	411	119	.290	5	35
OF	Dick Cox	124	398	118	.296	1	45
OF	Gus Felix	134	432	121	.280	3	53

==== Other batters ====
Note: G = Games played; AB = At bats; H = Hits; Avg. = Batting average; HR = Home runs; RBI = Runs batted in

Player	G	AB	H	Avg.	HR	RBI
Merwin Jacobson	110	288	71	.247	0	23
Jack Fournier	87	243	69	.284	11	48
Rabbit Maranville	78	234	55	.235	0	24
Charlie Hargreaves	85	208	52	.250	2	23
Sam Bohne	47	125	25	.200	1	11
Hank DeBerry	48	115	33	.287	0	13
Jerry Standaert	66	113	39	.345	0	14
Max Carey	27	100	26	.260	0	7
Whitey Witt	63	85	22	.259	0	3
Moose Clabaugh	11	14	1	.071	0	1
Snooks Dowd	2	8	0	.000	0	0
Milt Stock	3	8	0	.000	0	0

=== Pitching ===
==== Starting pitchers ====
Note: G = Games pitched; IP = Innings pitched; W = Wins; L = Losses; ERA = Earned run average; SO = Strikeouts

Player	G	IP	W	L	ERA	SO
Jesse Petty	38	275.2	17	17	2.84	101
Burleigh Grimes	30	225.1	12	13	3.71	64
Dazzy Vance	24	169.0	9	10	3.89	140
Jesse Barnes	31	158.0	10	11	5.24	29

==== Other pitchers ====
Note: G = Games pitched; IP = Innings pitched; W = Wins; L = Losses; ERA = Earned run average; SO = Strikeouts

Player	G	IP	W	L	ERA	SO
Doug McWeeny	42	216.1	11	13	3.04	96
Bob McGraw	33	174.1	9	13	4.59	49

==== Relief pitchers ====
Note: G = Games pitched; W = Wins; L = Losses; SV = Saves; ERA = Earned run average; SO = Strikeouts

Player	G	W	L	SV	ERA	SO
Rube Ehrhardt	44	2	5	4	3.90	25
George Boehler	10	1	0	0	4.41	10
Leon Williams	8	0	0	0	5.40	3
Dutch Stryker	2	0	0	0	27.00	0
Ray Moss	1	0	0	0	9.00	0
