= Chet Nichols =

Chet Nichols may refer to:

- Chet Nichols Sr. (1897–1982), pitcher in major league baseball from 1926 to 1932, the father of Chet Nichols, Jr.
- Chet Nichols Jr. (1931–1995), pitcher in major league baseball from 1951 to 1964
