= 1926 Pittsburgh Pirates season =

1926 Pittsburgh Pirates
- League: National League
- Ballpark: Forbes Field
- City: Pittsburgh, Pennsylvania
- Owners: Barney Dreyfuss
- Managers: Bill McKechnie

The 1926 Pittsburgh Pirates season was the 45th season of the Pittsburgh Pirates franchise. The defending World Series champion Pirates finished third in the National League with a record of 84–69.

== Regular season ==
=== Season standings ===
National League
Team	W	L	Pct.	GB	Home	Road
St. Louis Cardinals	89	65	.578	—	47‍–‍30	42‍–‍35
Cincinnati Reds	87	67	.565	2	53‍–‍23	34‍–‍44
Pittsburgh Pirates	84	69	.549	4½	49‍–‍28	35‍–‍41
Chicago Cubs	82	72	.532	7	49‍–‍28	33‍–‍44
New York Giants	74	77	.490	13½	43‍–‍33	31‍–‍44
Brooklyn Robins	71	82	.464	17½	38‍–‍38	33‍–‍44
Boston Braves	66	86	.434	22	43‍–‍34	23‍–‍52
Philadelphia Phillies	58	93	.384	29½	33‍–‍42	25‍–‍51

=== Record vs. opponents ===
1926 National League record Sources:
Team	BSN	BRO	CHC	CIN	NYG	PHI	PIT	STL
Boston	—	6–15	12–10	12–10–1	12–10	7–15	10–11	7–15
Brooklyn	15–6	—	14–8	4–18	9–13	13–9	9–13–2	7–15
Chicago	10–12	8–14	—	13–9–1	14–8	16–6	10–12	11–11
Cincinnati	10–12–1	18–4	9–13–1	—	7–15	16–6–1	13–9	14–8
New York	10–12	13–9	8–14	15–7	—	12–7	6–16	10–12
Philadelphia	15–7	9–13	6–16	6–16–1	7–12	—	8–14	7–15
Pittsburgh	11–10	13–9–2	12–10	9–13	16–6	14–8	—	9–13–2
St. Louis	15–7	15–7	11–11	8–14	12–10	15–7	13–9–2	—

=== Game log ===
1926 Game Log: 84–69 (Home: 49–28; Away: 35–41)
April: 7–10 (Home: 2–3; Away: 5–7)

#	Date	Opponent	Score	Win	Loss	Save	Attendance	Record
1	April 13	@ Cardinals	6–7	Rhem	**Aldridge** (0–1)	—	17,000	0–1
2	April 14	@ Cardinals	10–3	**Kremer** (1–0)	Bell	—	—	1–1
3	April 15	@ Cardinals	0–2	Keen	**Morrison** (0–1)	—	—	1–2
4	April 16	@ Cardinals	2–3	Sothoron	**Sheehan** (0–1)	—	—	1–3
5	April 17	@ Reds	3–4	Donohue	**Yde** (0–1)	May	5,500	1–4
6	April 18	@ Reds	3–1	**Aldridge** (1–1)	Luque	—	20,000	2–4
7	April 19	@ Reds	1–2	Mays	**Kremer** (1–1)	—	2,000	2–5
8	April 20	@ Reds	2–5	Lucas	**Morrison** (0–2)	—	4,700	2–6
9	April 22	Cardinals	3–5 (10)	Keen	**Morrison** (0–3)	—	—	2–7
10	April 23	Cardinals	3–2	**Aldridge** (2–1)	Johnson	—	—	3–7
11	April 24	Cardinals	3–9	Rhem	**Kremer** (1–2)	—	—	3–8
12	April 25	@ Cubs	3–4	Bush	**Yde** (0–2)	—	—	3–9
13	April 26	@ Cubs	8–6	**Meadows** (1–0)	Piercy	**Oldham** (1)	—	4–9
14	April 27	@ Cubs	2–0	**Morrison** (1–3)	Alexander	—	—	5–9
15	April 28	@ Cubs	9–4	**Aldridge** (3–1)	Kaufmann	—	—	6–9
16	April 29	Reds	9–16	Luque	**Sheehan** (0–2)	—	—	6–10
17	April 30	Reds	13–4	**Meadows** (2–0)	Mays	—	—	7–10

May: 16–8 (Home: 13–6; Away: 3–2)

#	Date	Opponent	Score	Win	Loss	Save	Attendance	Record
18	May 1	Reds	3–2	**Morrison** (2–3)	Lucas	**Kremer** (1)	—	8–10
19	May 2	@ Reds	3–4	Donohue	**Aldridge** (3–2)	—	18,000	8–11
20	May 5	Braves	3–2	**Meadows** (3–0)	Smith	—	—	9–11
21	May 6	Braves	1–3	Wertz	**Morrison** (2–4)	Hearn	—	9–12
22	May 7	Braves	11–10 (11)	**Adams** (1–0)	Benton	—	—	10–12
23	May 8	Braves	5–9	Graham	**Yde** (0–3)	—	—	10–13
24	May 11	Phillies	11–1	**Kremer** (2–2)	Mitchell	—	—	11–13
25	May 12	Phillies	14–3	**Meadows** (4–0)	Knight	—	—	12–13
26	May 13	Phillies	0–6	Carlson	**Aldridge** (3–3)	—	—	12–14
27	May 14	Robins	5–5 (7)			—	—	12–14
28	May 15	Robins	2–0	**Morrison** (3–4)	McGraw	—	—	13–14
29	May 17	Robins	7–6 (12)	**Oldham** (1–0)	Ehrhardt	—	—	14–14
30	May 18	Robins	4–4			—	—	14–14
31	May 19	Giants	6–3	**Aldridge** (4–3)	Scott	—	—	15–14
32	May 20	Giants	4–5	Greenfield	**Morrison** (3–5)	Davies	12,000	15–15
33	May 21	Giants	7–5	**Kremer** (3–2)	Ring	—	—	16–15
34	May 22	Giants	6–5	**Morrison** (4–5)	Greenfield	—	25,000	17–15
35	May 23	@ Reds	7–2	**Yde** (1–3)	Donohue	—	22,000	18–15
36	May 24	@ Cubs	1–3	Blake	**Aldridge** (4–4)	—	—	18–16
37	May 25	@ Cubs	5–2	**Morrison** (5–5)	Root	—	—	19–16
38	May 27	Cubs	2–5	Kaufmann	**Oldham** (1–1)	—	—	19–17
39	May 28	Cubs	6–5 (11)	**Meadows** (5–0)	Bush	—	—	20–17
40	May 29	Cubs	9–7	**Adams** (2–0)	Root	**Oldham** (2)	—	21–17
41	May 30	@ Reds	4–3	**Meadows** (6–0)	Luque	—	16,000	22–17
42	May 31	Reds	2–7	Mays	**Songer** (0–1)	—	—	22–18
43	May 31	Reds	9–5	**Morrison** (6–5)	Lucas	—	—	23–18

June: 11–12 (Home: 3–3; Away: 8–9)

#	Date	Opponent	Score	Win	Loss	Save	Attendance	Record
44	June 3	Cubs	3–2	**Yde** (2–3)	Root	—	—	24–18
45	June 4	Cubs	5–1	**Meadows** (7–0)	Bush	—	—	25–18
46	June 6	@ Robins	0–3	Grimes	**Aldridge** (4–5)	—	30,000	25–19
47	June 8	@ Robins	4–3	**Songer** (1–1)	McWeeny	**Kremer** (2)	—	26–19
48	June 9	@ Phillies	9–7 (10)	**Kremer** (4–2)	Knight	—	—	27–19
49	June 10	@ Phillies	9–13	Mitchell	**Adams** (2–1)	—	—	27–20
50	June 11	@ Phillies	11–13	Willoughby	**Aldridge** (4–6)	—	—	27–21
51	June 12	@ Phillies	8–2	**Songer** (2–1)	Carlson	—	—	28–21
52	June 14	@ Braves	2–3	Benton	**Yde** (2–4)	Mogridge	—	28–22
53	June 16	@ Braves	6–3	**Aldridge** (5–6)	Genewich	—	—	29–22
54	June 17	@ Giants	5–6 (13)	Fitzsimmons	**Adams** (2–2)	—	—	29–23
55	June 18	@ Giants	8–3	**Songer** (3–1)	Scott	—	—	30–23
56	June 19	@ Giants	4–2	**Kremer** (5–2)	Ring	—	30,000	31–23
57	June 20	@ Giants	8–0	**Aldridge** (6–6)	Greenfield	—	40,000	32–23
58	June 21	Cardinals	13–11	**Oldham** (2–1)	Huntzinger	**Kremer** (3)	—	33–23
59	June 22	@ Cardinals	3–1	**Meadows** (8–0)	Keen	—	—	34–23
60	June 23	@ Cardinals	2–6	Haines	**Songer** (3–2)	—	—	34–24
61	June 24	@ Cardinals	3–3			—	—	34–24
62	June 25	Reds	8–9	Lucas	**Oldham** (2–2)	—	—	34–25
63	June 26	Reds	1–9	Mays	**Meadows** (8–1)	—	—	34–26
64	June 27	@ Reds	0–16	Donohue	**Songer** (3–3)	—	25,000	34–27
65	June 28	@ Reds	1–6	Rixey	**Aldridge** (6–7)	—	5,500	34–28
66	June 29	@ Reds	3–6	Mays	**Kremer** (5–3)	—	6,600	34–29
67	June 30	Cardinals	2–6	Haines	**Meadows** (8–2)	—	—	34–30

July: 21–10 (Home: 17–7; Away: 4–3)

#	Date	Opponent	Score	Win	Loss	Save	Attendance	Record
68	July 1	Cardinals	7–3	**Songer** (4–3)	Rhem	**Adams** (1)	—	35–30
69	July 2	Cardinals	3–2	**Kremer** (6–3)	Alexander	—	—	36–30
70	July 3	Cardinals	12–3	**Aldridge** (7–7)	Bell	—	—	37–30
71	July 4	@ Cubs	0–2	Root	**Yde** (2–5)	—	—	37–31
72	July 5	Cubs	4–1	**Songer** (5–3)	Kaufmann	**Adams** (2)	—	38–31
73	July 5	Cubs	7–10	Piercy	**Meadows** (8–3)	Huntzinger	—	38–32
74	July 6	Cubs	0–3	Blake	**Bush** (0–1)	—	—	38–33
75	July 6	Cubs	3–2 (6)	**Meadows** (9–3)	Osborn	—	—	39–33
76	July 7	Phillies	8–7	**Aldridge** (8–7)	Dean	**Kremer** (4)	—	40–33
77	July 8	Phillies	6–10	Ulrich	**Adams** (2–3)	—	—	40–34
78	July 9	Phillies	9–6	**Meadows** (10–3)	Mitchell	—	—	41–34
79	July 10	Phillies	9–4	**Kremer** (7–3)	Carlson	—	—	42–34
80	July 12	Giants	6–3	**Aldridge** (9–7)	Scott	—	15,000	43–34
81	July 14	Giants	8–12	Ring	**Songer** (5–4)	—	—	43–35
82	July 14	Giants	2–5	Fitzsimmons	**Meadows** (10–4)	—	40,000	43–36
83	July 15	Giants	3–0	**Kremer** (8–3)	Greenfield	—	—	44–36
84	July 16	Braves	9–7	**Bush** (1–1)	Smith	**Songer** (1)	—	45–36
85	July 17	Braves	7–9	Goldsmith	**Aldridge** (9–8)	Mogridge	—	45–37
86	July 19	Braves	10–4	**Meadows** (11–4)	Genewich	—	—	46–37
87	July 20	Braves	8–5	**Kremer** (9–3)	Benton	**Bush** (1)	—	47–37
88	July 21	Robins	1–0	**Songer** (6–4)	Petty	—	—	48–37
89	July 21	Robins	2–6	Vance	**Aldridge** (9–9)	—	20,000	48–38
90	July 22	Robins	14–2	**Yde** (3–5)	Barnes	—	—	49–38
91	July 24	Robins	12–8	**Meadows** (12–4)	Grimes	**Songer** (2)	—	50–38
92	July 24	Robins	3–2	**Kremer** (10–3)	McGraw	—	25,000	51–38
93	July 25	@ Robins	1–3	Petty	**Bush** (1–2)	—	20,000	51–39
94	July 26	@ Robins	3–2	**Yde** (4–5)	Vance	**Adams** (3)	—	52–39
95	July 27	@ Giants	4–3	**Songer** (7–4)	Barnes	**Kremer** (5)	—	53–39
96	July 28	@ Giants	6–0	**Meadows** (13–4)	Scott	—	10,000	54–39
97	July 30	@ Phillies	1–6	Carlson	**Kremer** (10–4)	—	—	54–40
98	July 31	@ Phillies	10–5	**Yde** (5–5)	Mitchell	—	—	55–40

August: 16–12 (Home: 9–4; Away: 7–8)

#	Date	Opponent	Score	Win	Loss	Save	Attendance	Record
99	August 2	@ Phillies	3–8	Dean	**Songer** (7–5)	—	—	55–41
100	August 3	@ Phillies	14–2	**Bush** (2–2)	Ulrich	—	—	56–41
101	August 4	@ Braves	0–14	Smith	**Aldridge** (9–10)	—	—	56–42
102	August 4	@ Braves	5–2	**Meadows** (14–4)	Benton	—	—	57–42
103	August 5	@ Braves	4–3	**Kremer** (11–4)	Goldsmith	—	—	58–42
104	August 6	@ Braves	5–4	**Yde** (6–5)	Genewich	**Aldridge** (1)	—	59–42
105	August 7	@ Braves	0–2	Wertz	**Songer** (7–6)	—	—	59–43
106	August 7	@ Braves	0–2 (8)	Smith	**Bush** (2–3)	—	—	59–44
107	August 9	@ Robins	9–3	**Kremer** (12–4)	Petty	—	—	60–44
108	August 10	@ Robins	10–2	**Meadows** (15–4)	McWeeny	—	—	61–44
109	August 11	@ Robins	2–4	Vance	**Aldridge** (9–11)	McGraw	—	61–45
110	August 18	Braves	4–1	**Kremer** (13–4)	Smith	—	—	62–45
111	August 18	Braves	3–4	Wertz	**Meadows** (15–5)	—	—	62–46
112	August 19	Phillies	1–3 (10)	Carlson	**Songer** (7–7)	—	—	62–47
113	August 19	Phillies	4–0	**Yde** (7–5)	Ulrich	—	—	63–47
114	August 21	Phillies	4–2	**Bush** (3–3)	Dean	—	—	64–47
115	August 21	Phillies	8–5	**Kremer** (14–4)	Knight	—	—	65–47
116	August 23	Robins	3–7	Petty	**Meadows** (15–6)	—	—	65–48
117	August 23	Robins	10–2	**Yde** (8–5)	Barnes	—	—	66–48
118	August 24	Robins	10–1	**Kremer** (15–4)	Grimes	—	—	67–48
119	August 25	Robins	1–2	McGraw	**Aldridge** (9–12)	—	—	67–49
120	August 26	Giants	15–7	**Meadows** (16–6)	Fitzsimmons	**Morrison** (1)	—	68–49
121	August 27	Giants	4–0	**Bush** (4–3)	Barnes	—	—	69–49
122	August 28	Giants	8–7	**Meadows** (17–6)	Greenfield	**Morrison** (2)	—	70–49
123	August 29	@ Cardinals	2–2 (10)			—	40,000	70–49
124	August 30	@ Cardinals	3–0	**Kremer** (16–4)	Rhem	—	—	71–49
125	August 30	@ Cardinals	3–5	Haines	**Bush** (4–4)	—	—	71–50
126	August 31	@ Cardinals	1–6	Sherdel	**Meadows** (17–7)	—	—	71–51
127	August 31	@ Cardinals	1–2	Sothoron	**Morrison** (6–6)	—	23,279	71–52

September: 13–17 (Home: 5–5; Away: 8–12)

#	Date	Opponent	Score	Win	Loss	Save	Attendance	Record
128	September 1	@ Cardinals	2–5	Reinhart	**Kremer** (16–5)	—	20,000	71–53
129	September 3	@ Cubs	3–2 (10)	**Hill** (1–0)	Kaufmann	—	—	72–53
130	September 4	@ Cubs	2–11	Bush	**Bush** (4–5)	—	—	72–54
131	September 4	@ Cubs	2–3	Jones	**Koupal** (0–1)	—	—	72–55
132	September 5	@ Cubs	6–7 (6)	Osborn	**Songer** (7–8)	Huntzinger	16	72–56
133	September 6	Cardinals	1–8	Rhem	**Morrison** (6–7)	—	—	72–57
134	September 6	Cardinals	4–2	**Kremer** (17–5)	Sothoron	—	—	73–57
135	September 7	Cardinals	0–8	Sherdel	**Aldridge** (9–13)	—	—	73–58
136	September 8	Reds	6–1	**Meadows** (18–7)	Donohue	—	—	74–58
137	September 8	Reds	11–0	**Hill** (2–0)	Luque	—	—	75–58
138	September 9	Cubs	2–1	**Bush** (5–5)	Jones	—	—	76–58
139	September 9	Cubs	1–10	Kaufmann	**Koupal** (0–2)	—	—	76–59
140	September 10	Reds	5–2	**Kremer** (18–5)	Rixey	—	—	77–59
141	September 10	Reds	2–5	Lucas	**Morrison** (6–8)	—	—	77–60
142	September 11	Reds	6–10	Mays	**Hill** (2–1)	—	—	77–61
143	September 12	@ Giants	5–1	**Aldridge** (10–13)	Fitzsimmons	**Bush** (2)	—	78–61
144	September 12	@ Giants	7–1	**Meadows** (19–7)	Greenfield	—	40,000	79–61
145	September 13	@ Giants	5–9	Ring	**Hill** (2–2)	Davies	—	79–62
146	September 14	@ Giants	5–0	**Kremer** (19–5)	McQuillan	—	—	80–62
147	September 15	@ Giants	5–6	Scott	**Bush** (5–6)	—	—	80–63
148	September 16	@ Robins	1–2	Barnes	**Meadows** (19–8)	—	—	80–64
149	September 17	@ Robins	1–3	Vance	**Hill** (2–3)	—	—	80–65
150	September 18	@ Robins	1–3	McWeeny	**Yde** (8–6)	—	—	80–66
151	September 19	@ Robins	7–4	**Kremer** (20–5)	Grimes	—	20,000	81–66
152	September 20	@ Phillies	4–0	**Bush** (6–6)	Willoughby	—	—	82–66
153	September 21	@ Phillies	2–7	Mitchell	**Meadows** (19–9)	—	—	82–67
154	September 22	@ Phillies	9–3	**Hill** (3–3)	Dean	—	—	83–67
155	September 23	@ Braves	1–2	Edwards	**Kremer** (20–6)	Benton	—	83–68
156	September 25	@ Braves	11–8	**Meadows** (20–9)	Mogridge	**Bush** (3)	—	84–68
157	September 25	@ Braves	2–5	Genewich	**Yde** (8–7)	—	—	84–69

Legend: = Win = Loss = Tie
Bold = Pirates team member

=== Detailed records ===
National League
Opponent	W	L	WP	RS	RA
Boston Braves	11	10	0.524	97	102
Brooklyn Robins	13	9	0.591	113	77
Chicago Cubs	12	10	0.545	83	91
Cincinnati Reds	9	13	0.409	102	119
New York Giants	16	6	0.727	131	83
Philadelphia Phillies	14	8	0.636	154	113
**Pittsburgh Pirates**					
St. Louis Cardinals	9	13	0.409	89	104
Total	84	69	0.549	769	689
Season Total	84	69	0.549	769	689

Month	Games	Won	Lost	Win %	RS	RA
April	17	7	10	0.412	80	77
May	24	16	8	0.667	137	112
June	23	11	12	0.478	118	134
July	31	21	10	0.677	178	135
August	28	16	12	0.571	137	102
September	30	13	17	0.433	119	129
Total	153	84	69	0.549	769	689

	Games	Won	Lost	Win %	RS	RA
Home	77	49	28	0.636	437	365
Away	76	35	41	0.461	318	310
Total	153	84	69	0.549	769	689

=== Roster ===
1926 Pittsburgh Pirates
**Roster**
**Pitchers**: Babe Adams; Vic Aldridge; Joe Bush; Bud Culloton; Carmen Hill; Lou Koupal; Ray Kremer; Roy Mahaffey; Lee Meadows; Johnny Morrison; Chet Nichols; Red Oldham; Tom Sheehan; Don Songer; Emil Yde	**Catchers**: Johnny Gooch; Earl Smith; Roy Spencer; **Infielders**: Joe Cronin; George Grantham; Stuffy McInnis; Eddie Moore; Johnny Rawlings; Hal Rhyne; Pie Traynor; Glenn Wright	**Outfielders**: Clyde Barnhart; Carson Bigbee; Fred Brickell; Max Carey; Adam Comorosky; Kiki Cuyler; Walter Mueller; Eddie Murphy; Paul Waner	**Manager**: Bill McKechnie

== Player stats ==
=== Batting ===
==== Starters by position ====
Note: Pos = Position; G = Games played; AB = At bats; H = Hits; Avg. = Batting average; HR = Home runs; RBI = Runs batted in

Pos	Player	G	AB	H	Avg.	HR	RBI
C	Earl Smith	105	292	101	.346	2	46
1B	George Grantham	141	449	143	.318	8	70
2B	Hal Rhyne	109	366	92	.251	2	39
SS	Glenn Wright	119	458	141	.308	8	77
3B	Pie Traynor	152	574	182	.317	3	92
OF	Max Carey	86	324	72	.222	0	28
OF	Kiki Cuyler	157	614	197	.321	8	92
OF	Paul Waner	144	536	180	.336	8	79

==== Other batters ====
Note: G = Games played; AB = At bats; H = Hits; Avg. = Batting average; HR = Home runs; RBI = Runs batted in

Player	G	AB	H	Avg.	HR	RBI
Johnny Gooch	86	218	59	.271	1	42
Clyde Barnhart	76	203	39	.192	0	10
Johnny Rawlings	61	181	42	.232	0	20
Eddie Moore	43	132	30	.227	0	19
Stuffy McInnis	47	127	38	.299	0	13
Joe Cronin	38	83	22	.265	0	11
Carson Bigbee	42	68	15	.221	2	4
Walter Mueller	19	62	15	.242	0	3
Fred Brickell	24	55	19	.345	0	4
Roy Spencer	28	43	17	.395	0	4
Eddie Murphy	16	17	2	.118	0	6
Adam Comorosky	8	15	4	.267	0	0

=== Pitching ===
==== Starting pitchers ====
Note: G = Games pitched; IP = Innings pitched; W = Wins; L = Losses; ERA = Earned run average; SO = Strikeouts

Player	G	IP	W	L	ERA	SO
Ray Kremer	37	231.1	20	6	2.61	74
Lee Meadows	36	226.2	20	9	3.97	54
Vic Aldridge	30	190.0	10	13	4.07	61
Carmen Hill	6	39.2	3	3	3.40	8

==== Other pitchers ====
Note: G = Games pitched; IP = Innings pitched; W = Wins; L = Losses; ERA = Earned run average; SO = Strikeouts

Player	G	IP	W	L	ERA	SO
Emil Yde	37	187.1	8	7	3.65	34
Don Songer	35	126.1	7	8	3.13	27
Johnny Morrison	26	122.1	6	8	3.38	39
Joe Bush	19	110.2	6	6	3.01	38
Tom Sheehan	9	31.0	0	2	6.68	16
Lou Koupal	6	19.2	0	2	3.20	7

==== Relief pitchers ====
Note: G = Games pitched; W = Wins; L = Losses; SV = Saves; ERA = Earned run average; SO = Strikeouts

Player	G	W	L	SV	ERA	SO
Babe Adams	19	2	3	3	6.14	7
Red Oldham	17	2	2	2	5.62	16
Roy Mahaffey	4	0	0	0	0.00	3
Bud Culloton	4	0	0	0	7.36	1
Chet Nichols	3	0	0	0	8.22	2
