= Joe Kelly (1920s outfielder) =

American baseball player (1900–1967)

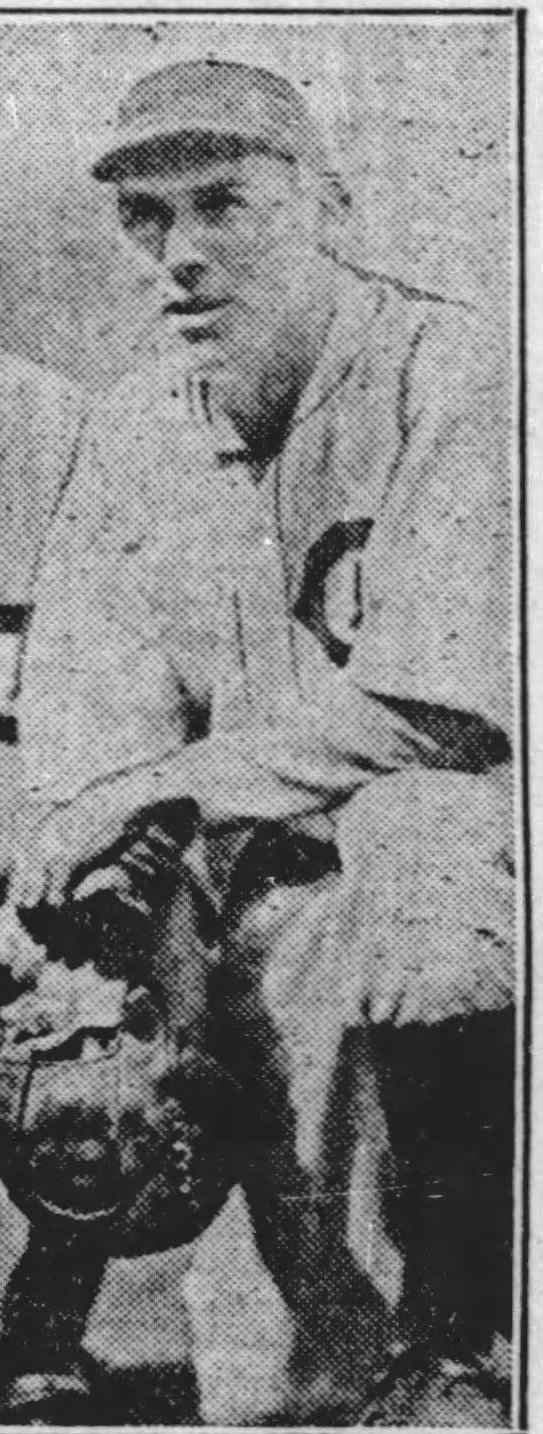
- Pinch hitter / Outfielder / First baseman
- Born: April 23, 1900; New York, New York, U.S.
- Died: November 24, 1967 (aged 67); Lynbrook, New York, U.S.
- Batted: Left Threw: Left

MLB debut
- April 13, 1926, for the Chicago Cubs

Last MLB appearance
- September 25, 1928, for the Chicago Cubs

MLB statistics
- Batting average: .307
- Home runs: 1
- Runs batted in: 39
- Stats at Baseball Reference

Teams
- Chicago Cubs (1926, 1928)

Joseph James Kelly (April 23, 1900 – November 25, 1967) was an American professional baseball player who appeared in 97 games as a pinch hitter, outfielder and first baseman in the Major League Baseball for the 1926 and 1928 Chicago Cubs. The native of New York City batted and threw and left-handed, stood 6 feet (1.8 m) tall and weighed 180 pounds (82 kg).

Kelly's pro career lasted for 11 seasons, 1921 through 1931. He played two full seasons for the Cubs, with a year as member of the 1927 Toledo Mud Hens of the minor-league American Association sandwiched in between. He batted .335 in 65 games as a rookie in 1926, but only .212 in his sophomore campaign two years later. In his 97 major-league games over two seasons, Kelly posted a .307 career batting average (70-for-228), with 19 runs, 16 doubles, three triples, one home run and 39 RBI.
