= Dick Attreau =

American baseball player (1897–1964)

- First baseman
- Born: April 8, 1897; Chicago, Illinois, U.S.
- Died: July 5, 1964 (aged 67); Chicago, Illinois, U.S.
- Batted: Left Threw: Left

MLB debut
- September 14, 1926, for the Philadelphia Phillies

Last MLB appearance
- September 28, 1927, for the Philadelphia Phillies

MLB statistics
- Batting average: .215
- Home runs: 1
- Runs batted in: 16
- Stats at Baseball Reference

Teams
- Philadelphia Phillies (1926–1927)

Richard Gilbert Attreau (April 8, 1897 – July 5, 1964) was an American Major League Baseball player. He played from 1926 to 1927 with the Philadelphia Phillies. Attreau batted and threw left-handed.

He was born and died in Chicago, Illinois.
