= Joseph Graves =

Joseph Graves may refer to:

- Joseph L. Graves Jr. (born 1955), American biologist and educator
- Joseph Graves (politician), member of the Michigan House of Representatives
- Joe Graves (1906–1980), baseball player
