= Ray Pierce =

Ray Pierce may refer to:

- Ray V. Pierce (1840–1914), U.S. Representative from New York
- Ray Pierce (baseball) (1897–1963), American baseball player
