= 1926 St. Louis Cardinals season =

Major League Baseball season

1926 St. Louis Cardinals
- World Series champions National League champions
- League: National League
- Ballpark: Sportsman's Park
- City: St. Louis, Missouri
- Record: 89–65 (.578)
- League place: 1st
- Owners: Sam Breadon
- General managers: Branch Rickey
- Managers: Rogers Hornsby

The 1926 St. Louis Cardinals season was the team's 45th season in St. Louis, Missouri and their 35th in the National League. The Cardinals went 89–65 during the season, and after a tight September, finished first in the National League, winning their first National League pennant. It was written that the "fans [in St. Louis] staged the wildest demonstration since the signing of the armistice" in November 1918.

In the World Series, they defeated the New York Yankees in 7 games, ending it by throwing out Babe Ruth at second base in the ninth inning of Game 7 to preserve a 3–2 victory. This was Rogers Hornsby's only full season as manager for the team.

Catcher Bob O'Farrell won the MVP Award this year, batting .293, with 7 home runs and 68 RBIs. Led by RBI champion Jim Bottomley, the offense scored the most runs in the NL.

== Regular season ==
- June 22: Grover Cleveland Alexander, a 39-year-old vet and future member of the Hall of Fame, was purchased off the waiver wire from the Chicago Cubs. Alexander went 23-16 for the Cardinals and eventually closed out the World Series.
- September 22: Tommy Thevenow hit the second and last home run of the season, and of his career. Thevenow would play for another 12 seasons and set a major league record by not hitting a home run in 3,347 at-bats. Thevenow did however hit a home run in Game 2 of the 1926 World Series.

=== Season standings ===
National League
Team	W	L	Pct.	GB	Home	Road
St. Louis Cardinals	89	65	.578	—	47‍–‍30	42‍–‍35
Cincinnati Reds	87	67	.565	2	53‍–‍23	34‍–‍44
Pittsburgh Pirates	84	69	.549	4½	49‍–‍28	35‍–‍41
Chicago Cubs	82	72	.532	7	49‍–‍28	33‍–‍44
New York Giants	74	77	.490	13½	43‍–‍33	31‍–‍44
Brooklyn Robins	71	82	.464	17½	38‍–‍38	33‍–‍44
Boston Braves	66	86	.434	22	43‍–‍34	23‍–‍52
Philadelphia Phillies	58	93	.384	29½	33‍–‍42	25‍–‍51

=== Record vs. opponents ===
1926 National League record Sources:
Team	BSN	BRO	CHC	CIN	NYG	PHI	PIT	STL
Boston	—	6–15	12–10	12–10–1	12–10	7–15	10–11	7–15
Brooklyn	15–6	—	14–8	4–18	9–13	13–9	9–13–2	7–15
Chicago	10–12	8–14	—	13–9–1	14–8	16–6	10–12	11–11
Cincinnati	10–12–1	18–4	9–13–1	—	7–15	16–6–1	13–9	14–8
New York	10–12	13–9	8–14	15–7	—	12–7	6–16	10–12
Philadelphia	15–7	9–13	6–16	6–16–1	7–12	—	8–14	7–15
Pittsburgh	11–10	13–9–2	12–10	9–13	16–6	14–8	—	9–13–2
St. Louis	15–7	15–7	11–11	8–14	12–10	15–7	13–9–2	—

=== Notable transactions ===
- June 14, 1926: Heinie Mueller was traded by the Cardinals to the New York Giants for Billy Southworth.
- June 22, 1926: Future Hall-of-Famer Grover Cleveland Alexander was purchased off of waivers by the Cardinals from the Chicago Cubs.

=== Roster ===
1926 St. Louis Cardinals
Roster
Pitchers: Pete Alexander; Hi Bell; Ed Clough; Eddie Dyer; Jesse Haines; Bill Hallahan; Walt Huntzinger; Syl Johnson; Vic Keen; Duster Mails; Art Reinhart; Flint Rhem; Bill Sherdel; Allen Sothoron	Catchers: Bob O'Farrell; Ernie Vick; Bill Warwick; Infielders: Les Bell; Jim Bottomley; Jake Flowers; Rogers Hornsby; Tommy Thevenow; Specs Toporcer	Outfielders: Ray Blades; Taylor Douthit; Chick Hafey; Wattie Holm; Heinie Mueller; Billy Southworth; Other batters: Jack Smith	Manager: Rogers Hornsby; Coaches: Bill Killefer; Otto Williams

== Player stats ==
= Indicates team leader

=== Batting ===
==== Starters by position ====
Note: Pos = Position; G = Games played; AB = At bats; H = Hits; Avg. = Batting average; HR = Home runs; RBI = Runs batted in

Pos	Player	G	AB	H	Avg.	HR	RBI
C	Bob O'Farrell	147	492	144	.293	7	68
1B	Jim Bottomley	154	603	180	.299	19	120
2B	Rogers Hornsby	134	527	167	.317	11	93
3B	Les Bell	155	581	189	.325	17	100
SS	Tommy Thevenow	156	563	144	.256	2	63
RF	Billy Southworth	99	391	124	.317	11	69
LF	Ray Blades	107	416	127	.305	8	43
CF	Taylor Douthit	139	530	163	.308	3	52

==== Other batters ====
Note: Pos = Position; G = Games played; AB = At bats; H = Hits; Avg. = Batting average; HR = Home runs; RBI = Runs batted in

Pos	Player	G	AB	H	Avg.	HR	RBI
OF	Chick Hafey	78	225	61	.271	4	38
OF	Heinie Mueller	52	191	51	.267	3	28
OF	Wattie Holm	55	144	41	.285	0	21
2B	Specs Toporcer	64	88	22	.250	0	9
IF	Jake Flowers	40	74	20	.270	3	9
C	Ernie Vick	24	51	10	.196	0	4
C	Bill Warwick	9	14	5	.357	0	2
PH	Jack Smith	1	1	0	.000	0	0

=== Pitching ===
==== Starting pitchers ====
Note: G = Games pitched; IP = Innings pitched; W = Wins; L = Losses; ERA = Earned run average; SO = Strikeouts

Player	G	IP	W	L	ERA	SO
Flint Rhem	34	258.0	20	7	3.21	72
Bill Sherdel	34	234.2	16	12	3.49	59
Jesse Haines	32	183.0	13	4	3.25	46
Vic Keen	26	152.0	10	9	4.56	29
Pete Alexander	23	148.1	9	7	2.91	35

==== Other pitchers ====
Note: G = Games pitched; IP = Innings pitched; W = Wins; L = Losses; ERA = Earned run average; SO = Strikeouts

Player	G	IP	W	L	ERA	SO
Art Reinhart	27	143.0	10	5	4.22	26
Hi Bell	27	85.0	6	6	3.18	27
Bill Hallahan	19	56.2	1	4	3.65	28
Syl Johnson	19	49.0	0	3	4.22	10

==== Relief pitchers ====
Note: G = Games pitched; W = Wins; L = Losses; SV = Saves; ERA = Earned run average; SO = Strikeouts

Player	G	W	L	SV	ERA	SO
Allan Sothoron	15	3	3	0	4.22	19
Walt Huntzinger	9	0	4	0	4.24	9
Eddie Dyer	6	1	0	0	11.57	4
Ed Clough	1	0	0	0	22.50	0
Duster Mails	1	0	1	0	0.00	0

== Awards and honors ==
=== League top five finishers ===
Les Bell

- #3 in NL in RBI (100)
- #4 in NL in home runs (17)

Ray Blades

- #4 in NL in on-base percentage (.409)

Jim Bottomley

- NL leader in RBI (120)
- #2 in NL in home runs (19)

Taylor Douthit

- #3 in NL in stolen bases (23)

Flint Rhem

- NL leader in wins (20)

== 1926 World Series ==
Game	Date	Visitor	Score	Home	Score	Record (NYY-STL)	Attendance
1	October 2	St. Louis Cardinals	1	New York Yankees	2	1–0	61,658
2	October 3	St. Louis Cardinals	6	New York Yankees	2	1–1	63,600
3	October 4	New York Yankees	0	St. Louis Cardinals	4	1–2	37,708
4	October 6	New York Yankees	10	St. Louis Cardinals	5	2–2	38,825
5	October 7	New York Yankees	3	St. Louis Cardinals	2	3–2	39,552
6	October 9	St.Louis Cardinals	10	New York Yankees	2	3–3	48,615
7	October 10	St. Louis Cardinals	3	New York Yankees	2	3-4	38,093
St. Louis Cardinals win 4–3

== Farm system ==
Level	Team	League	Manager
AA	Syracuse Stars	International League	Burt Shotton
A	Houston Buffaloes	Texas League	Joe Mathes
C	Fort Smith Twins	Western Association	Everitt Booe
D	Austin Senators	Texas Association	Chuck Miller
