= Lefty Taber =

American baseball player (1900–1983)

- Pitcher
- Born: January 11, 1900; Rock Island, Illinois, U.S.
- Died: November 5, 1983 (age 83); Lincoln, Nebraska, U.S.
- Batted: Left Threw: Left

MLB debut
- September 4, 1926, for the Philadelphia Phillies

Last MLB appearance
- September 30, 1927, for the Philadelphia Phillies

MLB statistics
- Record: 0–1
- Earned run average: 10.80
- Strikeouts: 0
- Stats at Baseball Reference

Teams
- Philadelphia Phillies (1926–1927)

Edward Timothy "Lefty" Taber (January 11, 1900 – November 5, 1983) was an American Major League Baseball pitcher who played in 1926 and 1927 with the Philadelphia Phillies. He batted and threw left-handed. Taber had a 0–1 record, with a 10.80 ERA, in nine games, over his two-year career.

Taber graduated from Rock Island High School in Illinois in 1918 where he starred in multiple sports. He later played college baseball and college basketball for the University of Dubuque. Taber did not play professional baseball between 1922 and 1925, instead playing semi-professional baseball while attending college.

Taber was born in Rock Island, Illinois, and died in Lincoln, Nebraska.
