= Ed Cotter =

American baseball player (1904-1959)

- Third baseman / Shortstop
- Born: July 4, 1904; Hartford, Connecticut
- Died: June 14, 1959 (aged 54); Hartford, Connecticut
- Batted: Right Threw: Right

MLB debut
- June 12, 1926, for the Philadelphia Phillies

Last MLB appearance
- August 11, 1926, for the Philadelphia Phillies

MLB statistics
- Batting average: .308
- Runs scored: 3
- Runs batted in: 1
- Stats at Baseball Reference

Teams
- Philadelphia Phillies (1926)

Edward Christopher Cotter (July 4, 1904 – June 14, 1959) was a third baseman and shortstop for the Philadelphia Phillies of Major League Baseball. He appeared in 17 career games for the Phillies during the months of June, July, and August 1926. He was officially listed as standing 6 feet (180 cm) tall and weighing 185 pounds (84 kg).

== Early life ==
Cotter was born July 4, 1904, in Hartford, Connecticut. Before playing in the major leagues, he attended Hartford Public High School, and then Villanova University from 1923 to 1926, 1 of 48 players from the school to play in Major League Baseball.

== Phillies career ==
Cotter made his Phillies debut on June 12, 1926, as a pinch hitter against the Pittsburgh Pirates. Batting for first baseman Russ Wrightstone in the fifth spot of Philadelphia's batting order, Cotter hit safely in his first career at-bat, stealing his first career base after reaching. In his second game two days later, Cotter replaced teammate Clarence Huber as the third baseman against the Chicago Cubs; he notched two more hits in the contest to open his career with three consecutive base hits. He made two more pinch-hitting appearances in June before replacing Heinie Sand at shortstop in the second game of a doubleheader against the Cincinnati Reds. After a ten-day layoff, he replaced Huber again as the third baseman, notching two more hits on June 30 against the Brooklyn Robins—the only multi-hit game of his career.

Entering as Huber's replacement, Cotter recorded a hitless game on July 4, 1926, striking out twice and recording a putout and two assists in the field. He recorded his next hit against the Pirates on July 10—raising his batting average to .400—and again versus the St. Louis Cardinals on July 19. He appeared in three more games in July, and three in August as well, but did not hit safely again until the final game of his career, when he had one hit in a 21–3 loss to Cincinnati. He was unconditionally released by the team on August 13.

== After baseball ==
Cotter died on June 14, 1959, in his hometown of Hartford, and was interred at Mount St. Benedict Cemetery in Bloomfield, Connecticut.
