= Leon Williams (baseball) =

American baseball player (1905-1984)

- Pitcher
- Born: December 2, 1905; Macon, Georgia
- Died: November 20, 1984 (aged 78); Atlanta
- Batted: Left Threw: Left

MLB debut
- June 2, 1926, for the Brooklyn Robins

Last MLB appearance
- August 30, 1926, for the Brooklyn Robins

MLB statistics
- Wins-losses: 0-0
- ERA: 5.40
- Strikeouts: 3
- Stats at Baseball Reference

Former teams
- Brooklyn Robins (1926)

Leon Theo Williams (December 2, 1905 – November 20, 1984), nicknamed "Lefty", was a Major League Baseball player who played pitcher in 1926. He played for the Brooklyn Robins.
