= Joe Buskey =

American baseball player (1902-1949)

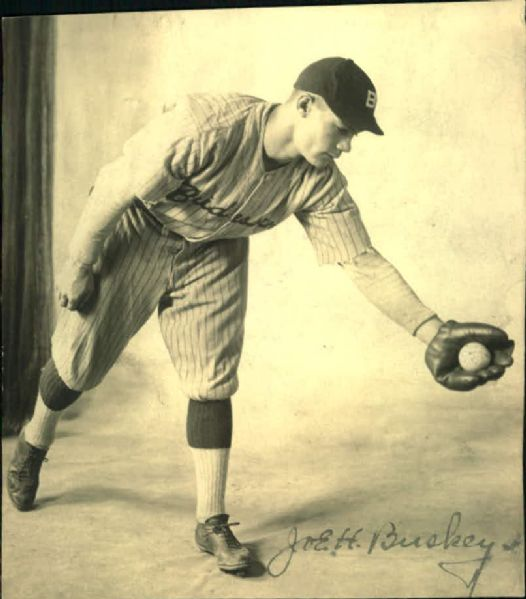
- Buskey playing for the Bradenton Growers in 1923
- Shortstop
- Born: December 18, 1902; Cumberland, Maryland, U.S.
- Died: April 11, 1949 (aged 46); Cumberland, Maryland, U.S.
- Batted: Right Threw: Right

MLB debut
- April 19, 1926, for the Philadelphia Phillies

Last MLB appearance
- April 28, 1926, for the Philadelphia Phillies

MLB statistics
- At bats: 8
- Runs: 1
- Batting average: .000
- Stats at Baseball Reference

Teams
- Philadelphia Phillies (1926)

Joseph "Jazzbow" Henry Buskey (December 18, 1902 – April 11, 1949) was an American professional baseball player who played in five games for the Philadelphia Phillies in 1926. He scored one run on no hits and one walk.

He was born in Cumberland, Maryland and died there at the age of 46.
