= Pete Rambo =

American baseball player (1906-1991)

- Pitcher
- Born: November 1, 1906; Thorofare, New Jersey, U.S.
- Died: June 19, 1991 (aged 84); Camden, New Jersey, U.S.
- Batted: Right Threw: Right

MLB debut
- September 16, 1926, for the Philadelphia Phillies

Last MLB appearance
- September 16, 1926, for the Philadelphia Phillies

MLB statistics
- Games played: 1
- Innings pitched: 3.2
- Earned run average: 14.73
- Stats at Baseball Reference

Teams
- Philadelphia Phillies (1926)

Warren Dawson "Pete" Rambo (November 1, 1906 – June 19, 1991) was an American pitcher in Major League Baseball. He played for the Philadelphia Phillies.

Rambo was born in the Thorofare section of West Deptford Township, New Jersey.

A single in his only at-bat left Rambo with a rare MLB career batting average of 1.000.
