= Pete Scott =

American baseball player (1897–1953)

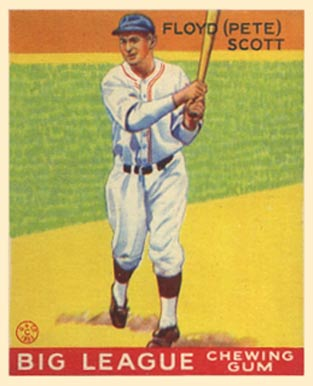
- Outfielder
- Born: December 21, 1897; Woodland, California, U.S.
- Died: May 3, 1953 (aged 55); Daly City, California, U.S.
- Batted: Right Threw: Right

MLB debut
- April 13, 1926, for the Chicago Cubs

Last MLB appearance
- September 27, 1928, for the Pittsburgh Pirates

MLB statistics
- Batting average: .303
- Home runs: 8
- Runs batted in: 88
- Stats at Baseball Reference

Teams
- Chicago Cubs (1926–1927); Pittsburgh Pirates (1928)

Floyd John "Pete" Scott (December 21, 1897 – May 3, 1953) was an American Major League Baseball player, who played outfield for three seasons from 1926 to 1928.

He made his debut with the Chicago Cubs during the 1926 season. In the 1927 off-season, he was traded to the Pittsburgh Pirates (along with Sparky Adams) for future Hall of Famer Hazen "Kiki" Cuyler.

In 208 games over three seasons, Scott posted a .303 batting average (158-for-522) with 95 runs, 41 doubles, 6 triples, 8 home runs, 88 RBIs, 59 bases on balls, .377 on-base percentage and .450 slugging percentage. He finished his career with a .975 fielding percentage, playing primarily at right and left field.

On July 8, 1924, Pete Scott, along with Bill Skiff, was questioned during a coroner's inquest about a young woman who fell down a freight elevator shaft after visiting his room. At the time, both were players for the Kansas City Blues, a minor league team.

Scott died on May 3, 1953, in Daly City, California.
