= Al Nixon =

American baseball player (1886-1960)

- Outfielder
- Born: April 11, 1886; Atlantic City, New Jersey, U.S.
- Died: November 9, 1960 (aged 74); Opelousas, Louisiana, U.S.
- Batted: Right Threw: Left

MLB debut
- September 4, 1915, for the Brooklyn Robins

Last MLB appearance
- June 6, 1928, for the Philadelphia Phillies

MLB statistics
- Batting average: .277
- Home runs: 7
- Runs batted in: 118
- Stats at Baseball Reference

Teams
- Brooklyn Robins (1915–1916, 1918); Boston Braves (1921–1923); Philadelphia Phillies (1926–1928)

Albert Richard Nixon (April 11, 1886 – November 9, 1960) was an American professional baseball outfielder. He played in Major League Baseball (MLB) for the Brooklyn Robins, Boston Braves, and Philadelphia Phillies between 1915 and 1928.

He helped the Robins win the 1916 National League Pennant.

In 9 seasons he played in 422 Games and had 1,345 At Bats, 180 Runs, 372 Hits, 60 Doubles, 13 Triples, 7 Home runs, 118 RBIs, 19 Stolen bases, 66 Walks, .277 Batting average, .314 On-base percentage, .356 Slugging percentage, 479 Total bases and 29 Sacrifice hits. Defensively, he recorded a .980 fielding percentage playing at all three outfield positions.

He died in Opelousas, Louisiana at the age of 74.

== Sources ==
- Career statistics from Baseball Reference · Baseball Reference (Minors) · Retrosheet · Baseball Almanac
