= Ralph Michaels =

American baseball player (1902–1988)

- Infielder
- Born: May 3, 1902; Etna, Pennsylvania, U.S.
- Died: August 5, 1988 (aged 86); Monroeville, Pennsylvania, U.S.
- Batted: Right Threw: Right

MLB debut
- April 14, 1924, for the Chicago Cubs

Last MLB appearance
- April 30, 1926, for the Chicago Cubs

MLB statistics
- Batting average: .295
- Home runs: 0
- Runs batted in: 8
- Stats at Baseball Reference

Teams
- Chicago Cubs (1924–1926)

Ralph Joseph Michaels (May 3, 1902 – August 5, 1988) was an American infielder who played for the Chicago Cubs from 1924 to 1926. He also played in the minor leagues in 1922 and 1923 and from 1926 to 1937.

Michaels made his major league debut on April 16, 1924. In eight games with the Cubs that season, he hit .364 with two RBI. In 1923, he played in 22 games for the Cubs, collecting 14 hits in 50 at-bats for a .280 batting average. He appeared in two games in 1926, though he did not have an at-bat - though he still managed to score a run. He played his final game on April 30 of that year, finishing his career with a .295 batting average in 32 games.

As a minor leaguer, Michaels hit .276 with 1,134 hits in 4,110 at-bats. Not a power hitter, he hit only 15 home runs in his career, along with 160 doubles and 41 triples. Perhaps his best season offensively was his very first - in 1922 with the Cedar Rapids Bunnies, Michaels hit .301 with 30 doubles in 129 games. He did not impress in the field that season however, as he committed 53 errors.

He also managed the Waterloo Hawks for part of the 1936 season.

Following his death, he was interred at St. Mary Church Cemetery in Pittsburgh, Pennsylvania.
