= George Stutz =

American baseball player (1893-1930)

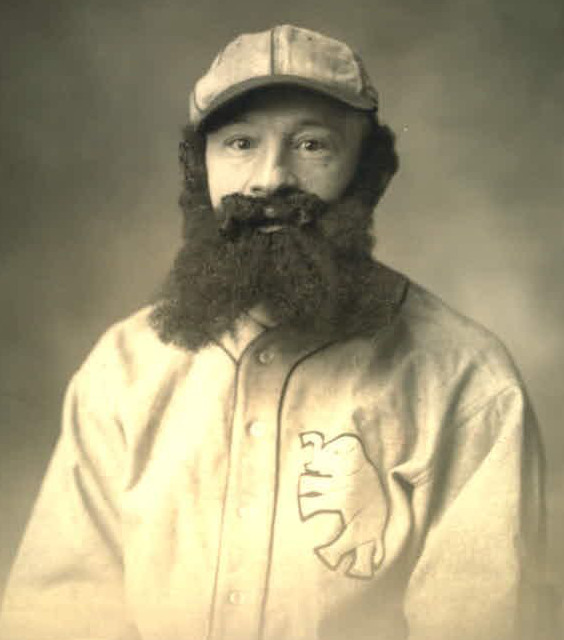
- Shortstop
- Born: February 13, 1889; Philadelphia, Pennsylvania, U.S.
- Died: December 29, 1930 (aged 41); Philadelphia, Pennsylvania, U.S.
- Batted: Right Threw: Right

MLB debut
- August 17, 1926, for the Philadelphia Phillies

Last MLB appearance
- August 28, 1926, for the Philadelphia Phillies

MLB statistics
- Games played: 6
- At bats: 9
- Hits: 0
- Stats at Baseball Reference

Teams
- Philadelphia Phillies (1926)

George Washington "Kid" Stutz (February 13, 1889 – December 29, 1930) was an American Major League Baseball shortstop. Stutz played for the Philadelphia Phillies in the 1926 season. In 6 career games, he had no hits in 9 at-bats. He batted and threw right-handed.

Stutz is pictured here in a Philadelphia Athletics uniform. This picture was taken in 1924 when Stutz was hired by Connie Mack to serve as a base coach and on-field entertainer for the Athletics. The moustache and beard he wore in the photograph were props he used in his on-field capering. In addition to "Kid," his other nickname was "Satan," and no one knows why.

Stutz was born and died in Philadelphia, Pennsylvania.
