= Mandy Brooks =

American baseball player (1897–1976)

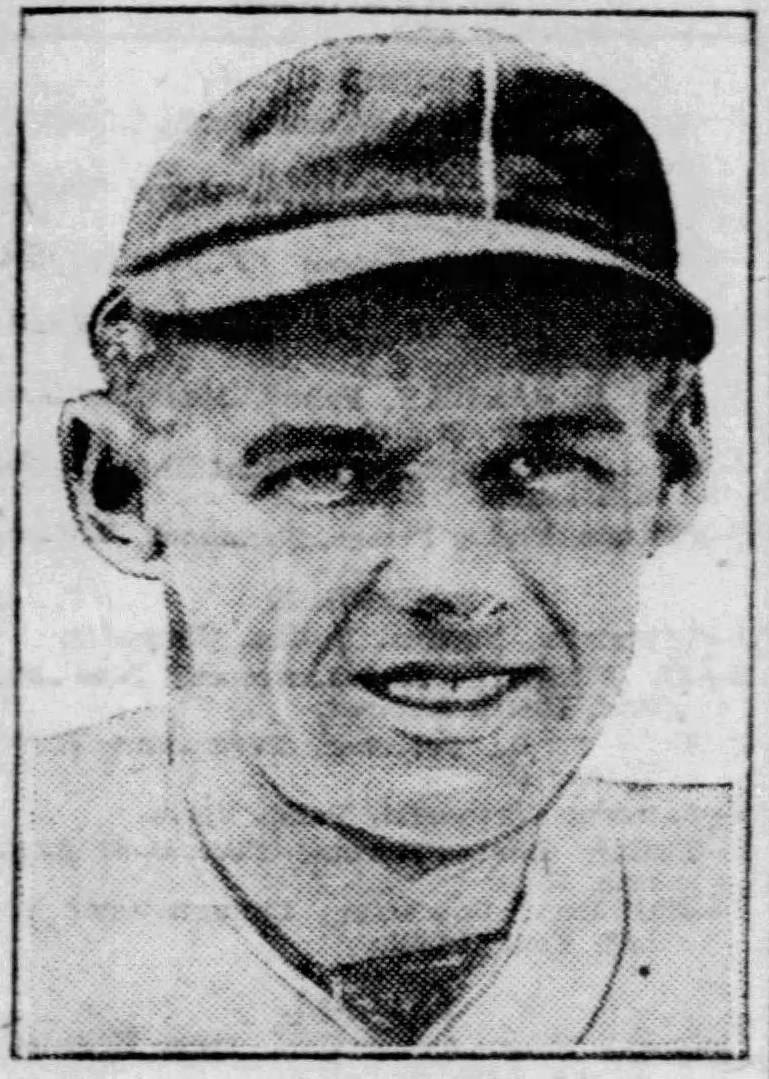
- Outfielder
- Born: August 18, 1897; Milwaukee, Wisconsin, U.S.
- Died: December 6, 1976 (aged 79); Fort Atkinson, Wisconsin, U.S.
- Batted: Right Threw: Right

MLB debut
- May 30, 1925, for the Chicago Cubs

Last MLB appearance
- June 22, 1926, for the Chicago Cubs

MLB statistics
- Batting average: .270
- Home runs: 15
- Runs batted in: 78
- Stats at Baseball Reference

Teams
- Chicago Cubs (1925–1926)

Jonathan Joseph Brozek (August 18, 1897 – December 6, 1976), known as Mandy Brooks or John Brooks, was an American professional baseball player. He played in Major League Baseball as an outfielder for the Chicago Cubs.

== Baseball career ==
Born in Milwaukee, Wisconsin, Brooks began his professional baseball career in 1924 with the Columbus Senators of the Tri-State League where he had 195 hits in 145 games for a .342 batting average.

His major-league debut came at the relatively advanced age of 27 on May 30, 1925. He reached 25 career RBI in 17 games, the fewest games for any major league player since the statistic came into existence in 1920, as per the Elias Sports Bureau. In his first 25 major league games he posted a .398 batting average along with 32 runs batted in and a 1.246 on-base plus slugging percentage.

Brooks went on to be a regular for the Cubs that season, playing the second-most games of any outfielder. Every one of his defensive appearances came in center field. It was a rather successful rookie campaign; Brooks trailed only future Hall of Fame member Gabby Hartnett for the club's lead in home runs with 14, good enough to finish tenth in the entire National League in that category. Brooks was also second on the Cubs in runs batted in (72) and slugging percentage (.513). He finished his first season with a respectable .281 batting average.

Brooks, however, fell victim to the Cubs' acquisition of star outfielder Hack Wilson and found himself all but useless in the 1926 season. He played his final game for the Cubs on June 22 of that year, finishing his final big-league campaign with modest marks of 1 home run, a .188 batting average, and 6 RBI. Brooks returned to the minor leagues where he played for a number of teams before retiring in 1931 at the age of 33.

== Career statistics ==
In a two-year major league career, Brooks played in 116 games, accumulating 107 hits in 397 at bats for a .270 career batting average along with 15 home runs, 78 runs batted in and an on-base percentage of .316. His career fielding percentage of .979 was higher than the league average of .967. In eight minor league seasons, Brooks had a .300 career batting average.

== Death ==
Brooks died on December 6, 1976, in Fort Atkinson, Wisconsin.
