= Chet Nichols Sr. =

American baseball player (1897–1982)

Chet Nichols
- Pitcher
- Born: July 2, 1897; Woonsocket, Rhode Island, U.S.
- Died: July 11, 1982 (aged 85); Pawtucket, Rhode Island, U.S.
- Batted: Right Threw: Right

MLB debut
- July 30, 1926, for the Pittsburgh Pirates

Last MLB appearance
- May 29, 1932, for the Philadelphia Phillies

MLB statistics
- Win–loss record: 1–8
- Earned run average: 7.19
- Strikeouts: 33
- Stats at Baseball Reference

Teams
- Pittsburgh Pirates (1926–1927); New York Giants (1928); Philadelphia Phillies (1930–1932)

Chester Raymond Nichols Sr. (July 2, 1897 – July 11, 1982) was an American professional baseball pitcher who appeared in 44 career games over six seasons in Major League Baseball between 1926 and 1932 for the Pittsburgh Pirates, New York Giants and Philadelphia Phillies. Born in Woonsocket, Rhode Island, he threw and batted right-handed, stood 5 feet 11 inches (1.80 m) tall and weighed 160 pounds (73 kg).

== Baseball career ==
=== Minor leagues ===
Nichols was 27 years of age when he broke into professional baseball in 1925. Pitching for the New Haven Profs of the higher-level Eastern League—a team then owned by future Baseball Hall of Fame executive George M. Weiss—Nichols won 15 games, lost 20, and compiled a 2.93 earned run average in 43 games and 304 innings of work. The following year, he was more successful, winning 13 and losing six, with an ERA of 2.37.

=== Major Leagues ===
He earned a promotion all the way to the National League Pirates, where he appeared in three games as a relief pitcher between July 30 and August 4, 1926, but posted a poor 8.22 ERA. Pittsburgh sent Nichols back to New Haven, where in 1927, he won six of ten decisions and sported an earned run average well below 3.0 at 2.60. But in a second trial with the Pirates, who were headed for the 1927 National League pennant, Nichols again fared poorly. He pitched in eight games, all in relief, lost all three of his decisions, and put up a mediocre 5.86 earned run average (which, unfortunately, would be the best ERA of his MLB career). His last appearance in a Buc uniform came on July 23, two months before the Pirates played in the 1927 World Series.

Nichols was drafted by another contending club, John McGraw's New York Giants, that off-season, but 1928 turned out to be the worst season of his major league career. Nichols allowed 13 runs (seven earned) and 11 hits in only three games and 22/3 innings. He spent part of 1928 and all of 1929 in the minor leagues with the Montreal Royals of the top-level International League.

Then, in October 1929, he was selected in the Rule 5 draft by the tail-ending Philadelphia Phillies. The 1930 campaign would be Nichols' only full year in Major League Baseball, and it was an historic season for his ball club. The 1930 Phillies batted .315 as a team; they featured two batters who hit over .380—Hall of Famer Chuck Klein (.386) and Lefty O'Doul (.383)—and scored 944 runs. But their pitching staff allowed 1,199 runs of their own, and posted a horrendous 6.71 earned run average. The Phillies finished 52–102 and dead last in the National League.

Nichols worked in 26 games for the 1930 Phillies, and compiled a 1–2 won–lost record with a 6.79 earned run average. He made the only five starts of his big-league career, and on June 17 recorded his only complete game and only victory in a major league uniform, defeating the Pirates 5–4 at the Baker Bowl, going all ten innings on the mound.

The following year saw Nichols appear mostly for the St. Paul Saints of the American Association, although he was treated roughly in three July games during another trial with the 1931 Phillies. In 1932, Nichols got into the last 11 games of his pro career, all as a relief pitcher for the Phillies. He dropped two more decisions, but earned his only MLB save (not then an official statistic) on April 25 against the Boston Braves. His final professional game came in a Philadelphia uniform on May 29; he was the losing pitcher in relief in a contest against the Giants.

All told, Nichols posted a 1–8 won–lost record as a big-leaguer, with a 7.19 career earned run average. He allowed 167 hits and 56 bases on balls, with 33 strikeouts, in 1222/3 innings pitched. However, his son, Chet Jr. (1931–1995), would enjoy a degree of success during his nine-season MLB pitching career (1951, 1954–1956, and 1960–1964), winning 34 games and, as a rookie, becoming the 1951 earned run average champion of the National League.
