= Wally Kimmick =

American baseball player (1897–1989)

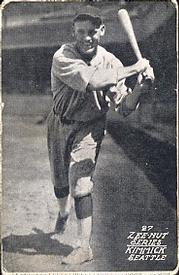
- Infielder
- Born: May 30, 1897; Turtle Creek, Pennsylvania, U.S.
- Died: July 24, 1989 (aged 92); Boswell, Pennsylvania, U.S.
- Batted: Right Threw: Right

MLB debut
- September 13, 1919, for the St. Louis Cardinals

Last MLB appearance
- June 12, 1926, for the Philadelphia Phillies

MLB statistics
- Batting average: .261
- Home runs: 1
- Runs batted in: 31
- Stats at Baseball Reference

Teams
- St. Louis Cardinals (1919); Cincinnati Reds (1921–1923); Philadelphia Phillies (1925–1926)

Walter Lyons Kimmick (May 30, 1897 – July 24, 1989) was an American professional baseball infielder. He played six seasons in Major League Baseball between 1919 and 1926, appearing in 163 games as a second baseman, third baseman and shortstop. He played for the St. Louis Cardinals, Cincinnati Reds and Philadelphia Phillies.

Kimmick was born in Turtle Creek, Pennsylvania, and died in Boswell, Pennsylvania.
