= Ed Clough =

American baseball player (1906–1944)

- Outfielder / Pitcher
- Born: October 28, 1906; Wiconisco, Pennsylvania, U.S.
- Died: January 30, 1944 (aged 37); Harrisburg, Pennsylvania, U.S.
- Batted: Left Threw: Left

MLB debut
- August 28, 1924, for the St. Louis Cardinals

Last MLB appearance
- September 25, 1926, for the St. Louis Cardinals

MLB statistics
- Batting average: .105
- Runs batted in: 1
- Win–loss record: 0–1
- Earned run average: 10.50
- Stats at Baseball Reference

Teams
- St. Louis Cardinals (1924–1926)

Edgar George Clough (October 28, 1906 – January 30, 1944) was an American outfielder and pitcher in Major League Baseball. He played for the St. Louis Cardinals.
