= Sterling Stryker =

American baseball player (1895-1964)

Dutch Stryker
- Pitcher
- Born: July 29, 1895; Atlantic Highlands, New Jersey, U.S.
- Died: November 5, 1964 (aged 69); Red Bank, New Jersey, U.S.
- Batted: Right Threw: Right

MLB debut
- April 16, 1924, for the Boston Braves

Last MLB appearance
- April 22, 1926, for the Brooklyn Robins

MLB statistics
- Win–loss record: 3-8
- Earned run average: 6.57
- Strikeouts: 22
- Stats at Baseball Reference

Teams
- Boston Braves (1924); Brooklyn Robins (1926)

Sterling Alpa Stryker (born July 29, 1895 – November 5, 1964) was an American pitcher in Major League Baseball who pitched in twenty games for the 1924 Boston Braves and in two games with the 1926 Brooklyn Robins.
