= Lee Dunham =

American baseball player (1902-1961)

- First baseman
- Born: June 9, 1902; Atlanta, Illinois, U.S.
- Died: May 11, 1961 (aged 58); Atlanta, Illinois, U.S.
- Batted: Left Threw: Left

MLB debut
- April 17, 1926, for the Philadelphia Phillies

Last MLB appearance
- September 24, 1926, for the Philadelphia Phillies

MLB statistics
- Batting average: .250
- Home runs: 0
- Runs batted in: 1
- Stats at Baseball Reference

Teams
- Philadelphia Phillies (1926)

Leland Huffield Dunham (June 9, 1902 – May 11, 1961) was an American first baseman in Major League Baseball. He played for the Philadelphia Phillies in 1926.

== Biography ==
Dunham was born in Atlanta, Illinois. After attending college, he started his professional baseball career in 1925 with the Binghamton Triplets of the New York-Pennsylvania League. He batted .334, which was the highest on his team.

The following season, Dunham earned a roster spot with the Philadelphia Phillies. He got into five games in April and May, getting one hit and driving in one run in four at-bats. He finished the season with the Virginia League's Wilson Bugs and batted .300 for them.

Dunham played until 1932. Over 910 career minor league games, he had 1,024 hits and a .310 batting average.

Dunham died in 1961, in Atlanta, Illinois, at the age of 58.
