= Harry Weber (baseball) =

American baseball player (1862–1926)

- Catcher
- Born: March 1862; New York
- Died: December 22, 1926 (aged 64); Indianapolis, Indiana
- Batted: Unknown Threw: Unknown

MLB debut
- July 22, 1884, for the Indianapolis Hoosiers

Last MLB appearance
- July 31, 1884, for the Indianapolis Hoosiers

MLB statistics
- Games played: 3
- At bats: 8
- Hits: 0
- Stats at Baseball Reference

Teams
- Indianapolis Hoosiers (1884)

Henry J. Weber (March 1862 - December 22, 1926) was an American Major League Baseball catcher who played in 1884 with the Indianapolis Hoosiers.

Weber played in 3 games, going hitless in 8 at-bats.

== Death and Burial ==
Weber is buried at Crown Hill Cemetery and Arboretum, Section 56, Lot 492.
