= Ray Moss =

American baseball player (1901-1998)

- Pitcher
- Born: December 5, 1901; Chattanooga, Tennessee, U.S.
- Died: August 9, 1998 (aged 96); Chattanooga, Tennessee, U.S.
- Batted: Right Threw: Right

MLB debut
- April 17, 1926, for the Brooklyn Robins

Last MLB appearance
- August 2, 1931, for the Boston Braves

MLB statistics
- Win–loss record: 22–18
- Earned run average: 4.95
- Strikeouts: 109
- Stats at Baseball Reference

Teams
- Brooklyn Robins (1926–1931); Boston Braves (1931)

Raymond Earl Moss (December 5, 1901 – August 9, 1998) was an American pitcher in Major League Baseball. He pitched from 1926 to 1931 with the Brooklyn Robins and Boston Braves.
