= Joe Graves =

American baseball player (1906–1980)

- Third baseman
- Born: February 26, 1906; Marblehead, Massachusetts, U.S.
- Died: December 22, 1980 (aged 74); Salem, Massachusetts, U.S.
- Batted: Right Threw: Right

MLB debut
- September 26, 1926, for the Chicago Cubs

Last MLB appearance
- September 26, 1926, for the Chicago Cubs

MLB statistics
- Games played: 2
- At bats: 5
- Hits: 0
- Stats at Baseball Reference

Teams
- Chicago Cubs (1926)

Joseph Ebenezer Graves (February 26, 1906 – December 22, 1980) was an American third baseman in Major League Baseball. He played for the Chicago Cubs in 1926.
