= Ray Pierce (baseball) =

American baseball player (1897–1963)

- Pitcher
- Born: June 6, 1897; Emporia, Kansas, U.S.
- Died: May 4, 1963 (aged 65); Denver, Colorado, U.S.
- Batted: Left Threw: Left

MLB debut
- May 12, 1924, for the Chicago Cubs

Last MLB appearance
- September 16, 1926, for the Philadelphia Phillies

MLB statistics
- Win–loss record: 7–11
- Earned run average: 5.64
- Strikeouts: 38
- Stats at Baseball Reference

Teams
- Chicago Cubs (1924); Philadelphia Phillies (1925–1926)

Raymond Lester Pierce (June 6, 1897 – May 4, 1963) was an American professional baseball player who played pitcher in the Major Leagues from 1924 to 1926. He played for the Chicago Cubs and Philadelphia Phillies.
