= Walt Huntzinger =

American baseball player (1899–1981)

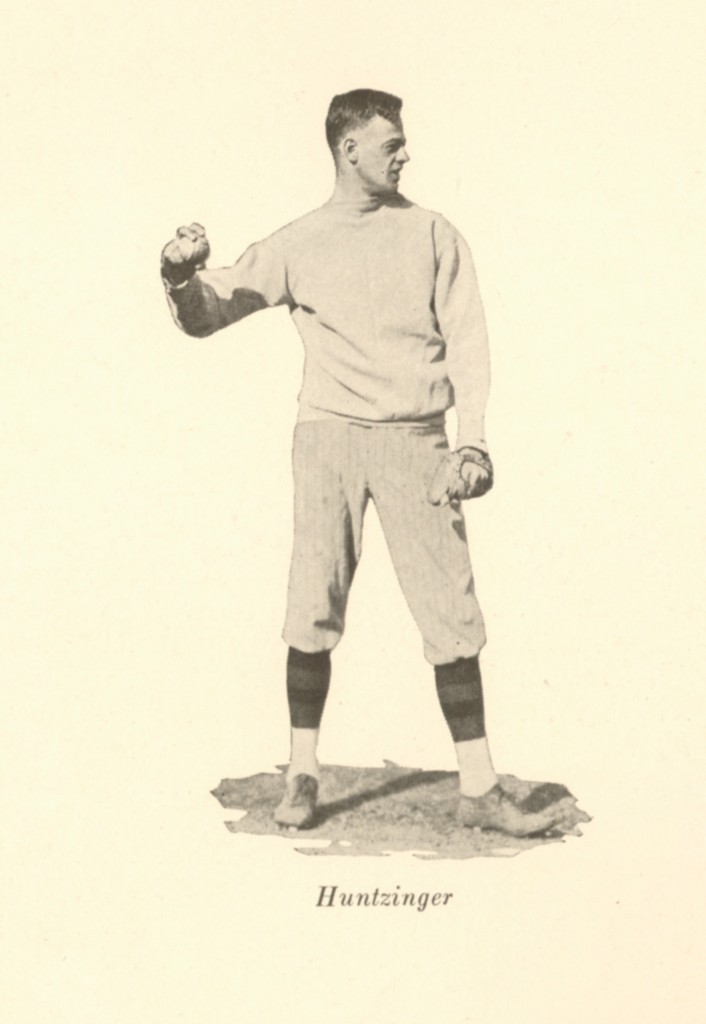
- Pitcher
- Born: February 6, 1899; Pottsville, Pennsylvania
- Died: August 11, 1981 (aged 82); Upper Darby Township, Pennsylvania
- Batted: Right Threw: Right

MLB debut
- September 29, 1923, for the New York Giants

Last MLB appearance
- September 15, 1926, for the Chicago Cubs

MLB statistics
- Win–loss record: 7–8
- Earned run average: 3.60
- Strikeouts: 40
- Stats at Baseball Reference

Teams
- New York Giants (1923–1925); St. Louis Cardinals (1926); Chicago Cubs (1926)

Walter Henry Huntzinger (February 6, 1899 – August 11, 1981) was a pitcher in Major League Baseball. He played for the New York Giants, St. Louis Cardinals, and Chicago Cubs. Huntzinger played college baseball and college basketball at the University of Pennsylvania. He coached basketball at Haverford College from 1922 to 1924, compiling a record of 2–24.
