= Chet Nichols Jr. =

American baseball player (1931–1995)

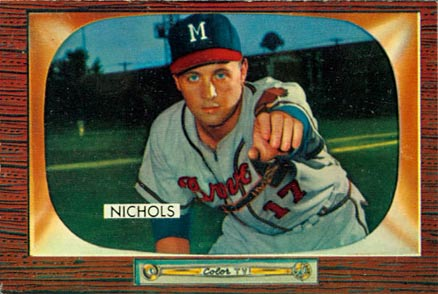
- Pitcher
- Born: February 22, 1931; Pawtucket, Rhode Island, U.S.
- Died: March 27, 1995 (aged 64); Lincoln, Rhode Island, U.S.
- Batted: Switch Threw: Left

MLB debut
- April 19, 1951, for the Boston Braves

Last MLB appearance
- April 24, 1964, for the Cincinnati Reds

MLB statistics
- Win–loss record: 34–36
- Earned run average: 3.64
- Strikeouts: 266
- Stats at Baseball Reference

Teams
- Boston / Milwaukee Braves (1951, 1954–1956); Boston Red Sox (1960–1963); Cincinnati Reds (1964)

Career highlights and awards
- NL ERA leader (1951)

Chester Raymond Nichols Jr. (February 22, 1931 – March 27, 1995) was an American professional baseball player. A 6 ft 1 in (1.85 m) tall, 165 lb (75 kg) left-hander, he was a pitcher over all or parts of nine seasons (1951, 1954–1956, 1960–1964) with the Boston and Milwaukee Braves, Boston Red Sox and Cincinnati Reds. In 1951, he was the National League earned run average (ERA) champion as a 20-year-old rookie, and was the runner-up to Willie Mays for the league's Rookie of the Year Award. He was the son of former major league pitcher Chet Nichols Sr., a right-hander who appeared in 44 games for three National League clubs between 1926 and 1932.

== Career ==
=== Boston Braves ===
Nichols Jr. was born in Pawtucket, Rhode Island, where he attended East High School. After spending the 1949 and 1950 seasons in the Braves' farm system, he made Boston's 1951 roster out of spring training. He pitched exclusively in relief through May 23, posting a 3.00 ERA. In his first starting assignment, June 3 at Braves Field against the Cincinnati Reds, he held a 2–1 lead into the eighth inning when Cincinnati rallied for three runs; Nichols was saddled with the 4–2 defeat, but he threw a complete game and earned a place in Boston's starting rotation. Six days later, Nichols threw another complete game, this time a six-hit, 6–1 triumph over the St. Louis Cardinals. Nichols went on to work in 33 games, 19 as a starter, and compiled an 11–8 won–lost record. His 2.88 earned run average in 156 innings pitched was five-one-hundredths of a point better than Sal Maglie's 2.93, giving Nichols the National League's ERA title. He threw 12 total complete games, posted three shutouts, and earned two saves out of the bullpen.

=== Milwaukee Braves ===
Nichols then missed the 1952 and 1953 seasons while serving in the United States Army during the Korean War. He returned to the Braves, now based in Milwaukee, in 1954, but his performance declined. His ERA swelled to 4.41 and he issued 65 bases on balls to only 55 strikeouts in 1221/3 innings pitched. The following season, 1955, he lowered his ERA to 4.00, but still struggled with wildness, walking 67 men and striking out only 44 in 144 innings of work. After two lackluster performances in early 1956, Nichols was demoted to the minor leagues.

=== Boston Red Sox ===
The Braves released him after the 1957 season, and Nichols spent all of 1958 out of the game working as a bank teller in his native Rhode Island, before getting a successful tryout with the American League Red Sox, Boston's surviving MLB team, who signed him to a minor-league contract for 1959. Two strong seasons at the Triple-A level resulted in Nichols' promotion to the Red Sox in September 1960. He spent the full seasons of 1961 through 1963 with the Red Sox, largely as a left-handed relief specialist. In 1961, he put up a stellar 2.09 earned run average in 512/3 innings, with three saves.

=== Final season and retirement ===
Boston released him after the 1963 season, and Nichols caught on with the Reds for 1964, but he was released after three early-season relief appearances, ending his MLB career.

In the major leagues, Nichols compiled a 34–36 record in 189 appearances, 71 of them starts, with a 3.64 ERA. In 6031/3 innings pitched, he allowed 600 hits and 280 bases on balls, with 266 strikeouts. He threw 23 complete games and four shutouts, and earned ten saves out of the bullpen. He returned to the banking field after his playing days, rising into management positions, and in 1977 he played an integral role in helping Rhode Island businessman Ben Mondor purchase the struggling Pawtucket Red Sox of the International League; during his 33-year stewardship, Mondor turned the "PawSox" into a highly successful Triple-A franchise.

Nichols died of cancer at his home in Lincoln, Rhode Island at the age of 64.

== See also ==
- List of second-generation Major League Baseball players
