= Clarence Huber =

American baseball player (1895–1965)

- Third baseman
- Born: October 27, 1895; Tyler, Texas, U.S.
- Died: February 22, 1965 (aged 69); Laredo, Texas, U.S.
- Batted: Right Threw: Right

MLB debut
- September 17, 1920, for the Detroit Tigers

Last MLB appearance
- September 29, 1926, for the Philadelphia Phillies

MLB statistics
- Batting average: .263
- Home runs: 6
- Runs batted in: 93
- Stats at Baseball Reference

Teams
- Detroit Tigers (1920–1921); Philadelphia Phillies (1925–1926)

Clarence Bill Huber (October 27, 1895 – February 22, 1965) was an American third baseman in Major League Baseball. He played for the Detroit Tigers and Philadelphia Phillies.
