= Jesse Petty =

American baseball player (1894–1971)

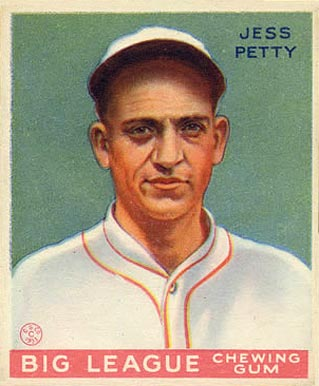
- Pitcher
- Born: November 23, 1894; Orr, Oklahoma, U.S.
- Died: October 23, 1971 (aged 76); St. Paul, Minnesota, U.S.
- Batted: Right Threw: Left

MLB debut
- April 14, 1921, for the Cleveland Indians

Last MLB appearance
- September 28, 1930, for the Chicago Cubs

MLB statistics
- Win–loss record: 67–78
- Earned run average: 3.68
- Strikeouts: 407
- Stats at Baseball Reference

Teams
- Cleveland Indians (1921); Brooklyn Robins (1925–1928); Pittsburgh Pirates (1929–1930); Chicago Cubs (1930)

Jesse Lee Petty (November 23, 1894 – October 23, 1971), known as "the Silver Fox", was an American professional baseball pitcher in the major leagues from 1921 to 1930, for the Cleveland Indians, Brooklyn Robins, Pittsburgh Pirates, and Chicago Cubs.

He managed in the minor leagues in 1935 and 1936 for the Knoxville Smokies of the Southern Association and the Hopkinsville Hoppers of the Kentucky–Illinois–Tennessee League.

The passenger list of the ship "Dante Alighier", July 18, 1918 shows he came from Olney, TX. This list is for the Army enlisted for Company "I", 143rd Infantry, 36th Division. Jesse was a Private.

His family lived in the Loving, Jean, Olney, TX area. His Father was Stephen Petty and his GrandFather was also Stephen Petty. His Father was a Brother to Jeptha, Joseph, Sylvanus, and Jesse Petty. All four of these Brothers served in the Confederate Army. But Stephen did not. He was too young. Joseph and Sylvanus Petty died at Camp Douglas Confederate P.O.W. camp in 1862. Their names are on the metal plaques surrounding Confederate Mound in Oak Woods Cemetery, Chicago, Illinois.

Jess was born in "Indian Territory", Chickasaw Nation, before Oklahoma became a U.S state. He began his baseball career in 1915 with the San Antonio Broncos. Then Cleveland drafted him in late 1915. He was drafted into the Army in 1918, then in 1919 he was back playing minor league baseball again. He pitched left handed. In 1920 he began playing for the Indianapolis Indians, a minor league team. He was called up to the majors by Cleveland in 1921 but only played 9 games, then it was back to Indianapolis until 1925. He had a very good year for Indianapolis in 1924, winning 29 and losing 9, with an ERA of 2.83. Then he was called up to the majors by the Brooklyn Robins (Dodgers) in 1925. He played 4 seasons for the Robins (Dodgers)

https://ripbaseball.com/2019/04/20/grave-story-jesse-petty/

Preceded by Dazzy Vance	Brooklyn Robins Opening Day; Starting pitcher 1926–1928	Succeeded by Watty Clark
