= Russ Wrightstone =

American baseball player

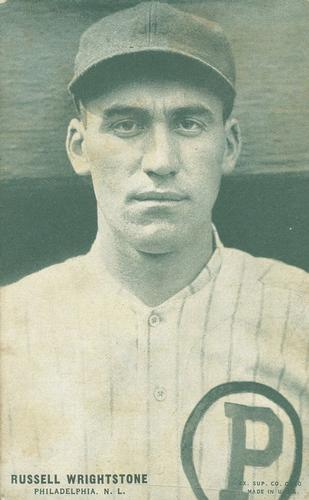
- Utility player
- Born: March 18, 1893; Bowmansdale, Pennsylvania, U.S.
- Died: February 25, 1969 (aged 75); Harrisburg, Pennsylvania, U.S.
- Batted: Left Threw: Right

MLB debut
- April 19, 1920, for the Philadelphia Phillies

Last MLB appearance
- September 29, 1928, for the New York Giants

MLB statistics
- Batting average: .297
- Home runs: 60
- Runs batted in: 425
- Stats at Baseball Reference

Teams
- Philadelphia Phillies (1920–1928); New York Giants (1928)

Russell Guy Wrightstone (March 18, 1893 – February 25, 1969) was an American professional baseball player. He played nine seasons in Major League Baseball, from 1920 to 1928, for the Philadelphia Phillies and New York Giants. He played six different positions, most often as a third baseman or first baseman. He hit .300 or better 5 times. In 1925 with the Phillies, he hit .346 and hit 14 home runs, both career highs. He drove in 75 runs and scored 62 runs in 1927, also career highs. He finished his career with the Giants in 1928. Casey Stengel considered Wrightstone the purest line drive hitter he had ever seen.

== Career statistics ==
In 929 games played in nine seasons, Wrightstone compiled a .297 batting average (889-for-2992) with 427 runs, 152 doubles, 34 triples, 60 home runs, 425 RBI, 215 walks, .349 on-base percentage and .431 slugging percentage. His overall career fielding percentage was .966.
