= Ray Kremer =

American baseball player (1895–1965)

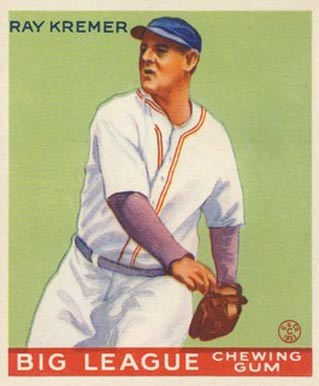
- Pitcher
- Born: March 23, 1895; Oakland, California, U.S.
- Died: February 8, 1965 (aged 69); Pinole, California, U.S.
- Batted: Right Threw: Right

MLB debut
- April 18, 1924, for the Pittsburgh Pirates

Last MLB appearance
- July 1, 1933, for the Pittsburgh Pirates

MLB statistics
- Win–loss record: 143–85
- Earned run average: 3.76
- Strikeouts: 516
- Stats at Baseball Reference

Teams
- Pittsburgh Pirates (1924–1933)

Career highlights and awards
- World Series champion (1925); 2× NL wins leader (1926, 1930); 2× NL ERA leader (1926, 1927)

Remy Peter "Ray" Kremer (March 23, 1895 – February 8, 1965) was an American professional baseball player. He played his entire career in Major League Baseball as a right-handed pitcher for the Pittsburgh Pirates from 1924 to 1933.

== Early life ==
Ray Kremer was born in Oakland, California, to French immigrants Nicholas and Mary Kremer. Nicholas operated a foundry and was a locally notable statue maker. Ray attended Polytechnic High School in Oakland, playing in semiprofessional baseball leagues while still a student. He was expected to enter the metalworking trade like his father and brothers, but opted to continue playing baseball instead. In 1914, Kremer signed his first professional contract with the Sacramento Wolves of the Pacific Coast League.

== Baseball career ==
Kremer spent the first ten seasons of his career playing in the minor leagues. In 1916, he signed with the New York Giants and participated in spring training, but struggled with joint pain. He was sent back to the minors and released the following summer. After recovering, he joined the Oakland Oaks of his hometown, eventually playing seven seasons with the team. In December 1923, he was signed by the Pittsburgh Pirates, finally reaching the major leagues. Kremer is notable for beginning his major league career at age 29, an uncommonly old age for a rookie.

Kremer had an impressive beginning to his major league career. He pitched five complete games to begin his major league career and posted an 18–10 record as a rookie in 1924, then followed that with seasons of 17–8, 20-6 and 19–8. He was third in the vote for the National League's most valuable player in 1926.

The Pirates won a pair of pennants during that stretch. Kremer threw two complete games in the 1925 World Series against the Washington Senators, and after winning Game 6 with a six-hitter, Kremer was brought back for four innings of relief in Game 7 and ended up the winning pitcher in that game as well. He also made one start in the 1927 World Series, chosen to pitch Game 1 against a New York Yankees team thought by many to be the greatest baseball team of all time.

He led the National League in ERA in both 1926 and 1927.

Kremer put up some of the most impressive numbers of his career in 1930, leading the league in wins (20), games started (38) and innings pitched (276).

For his career, he compiled a 143–85 record in 308 appearances, with a 3.76 ERA and 516 strikeouts. Kremer's 143 wins with Pittsburgh rank him eighth in franchise history, his .627 winning percentage ranks seventh, and his 1,954 2/3 innings pitched rank tenth.

As a hitter, Kremer posted a .178 batting average (122-for-687) with 57 runs, 5 home runs, 69 RBIs and 37 bases on balls. Defensively, he recorded a .974 fielding percentage.

After being waived by the Pirates, Kremer played two more short stints with the Oakland Oaks in 1933 and 1934 before retiring from baseball.

== Personal life ==
Kremer and his wife Beulah had one daughter, Betty. After his baseball career he became a postal carrier in the Bay Area, eventually retiring to Pinole, California. Kremer died in Pinole on February 8, 1965, and is buried in Sunset View Cemetery.

== See also ==
- List of Major League Baseball annual ERA leaders
- List of Major League Baseball annual wins leaders
- List of Major League Baseball players who spent their entire career with one franchise
