= 1926 in baseball =

The following are the baseball events of the year 1926 throughout the world.

== Champions ==
- World Series: St. Louis Cardinals over New York Yankees (4–3)
- Negro World Series: Chicago American Giants over Bacharach Giants (5–4–2)

NNL Championship Series			World Series
			ECL	Atlantic City	4
NNL1	Kansas City	4	NNL	Chicago	5
NNL2	Chicago	5

== Awards and honors ==
- League Award
  - George Burns, Cleveland Indians, 1B
  - Bob O'Farrell, St. Louis Cardinals, C

== Statistical leaders ==
	American League		National League		Eastern Colored League		Negro National League	
Stat	Player	Total	Player	Total	Player	Total	Player	Total
AVG	Heinie Manush (DET)	.378	Bubbles Hargrave (CIN)	.353	Martín Dihigo (CSE)	.375	Mule Suttles^{1} (SLS)	.425
HR	Babe Ruth (NYY)	47	Hack Wilson (CHC)	21	Martín Dihigo (CSE)	14	Mule Suttles^{1} (SLS)	32
RBI	Babe Ruth (NYY)	153	Jim Bottomley (STL)	120	Clint Thomas (HIL)	78	Mule Suttles^{1} (SLS)	130
W	George Uhle (CLE)	27	Pete Donohue (CIN); Ray Kremer (PIT); Lee Meadows (PIT); Flint Rhem (STL)	20	Nip Winters (HIL)	17	Logan Hensley (SLS)	18
ERA	Lefty Grove (PHA)	2.51	Ray Kremer (PIT)	2.61	Willis Flournoy (BRG)	2.32	Bill Foster (CAG)	1.80
K	Lefty Grove (PHA)	194	Dazzy Vance (BRO)	140	Claude Grier (BG)	141	Logan Hensley (SLS)	122

^{1} Negro National League Triple Crown batting winner

== Major league baseball final standings ==
=== American League final standings ===
American League
Team	W	L	Pct.	GB	Home	Road
New York Yankees	91	63	.591	—	50‍–‍25	41‍–‍38
Cleveland Indians	88	66	.571	3	49‍–‍31	39‍–‍35
Philadelphia Athletics	83	67	.553	6	44‍–‍27	39‍–‍40
Washington Senators	81	69	.540	8	42‍–‍30	39‍–‍39
Chicago White Sox	81	72	.529	9½	47‍–‍31	34‍–‍41
Detroit Tigers	79	75	.513	12	39‍–‍41	40‍–‍34
St. Louis Browns	62	92	.403	29	40‍–‍39	22‍–‍53
Boston Red Sox	46	107	.301	44½	25‍–‍51	21‍–‍56

Locations of teams for the 1923–1931 American League seasons
American League

=== National League final standings ===
National League
Team	W	L	Pct.	GB	Home	Road
St. Louis Cardinals	89	65	.578	—	47‍–‍30	42‍–‍35
Cincinnati Reds	87	67	.565	2	53‍–‍23	34‍–‍44
Pittsburgh Pirates	84	69	.549	4½	49‍–‍28	35‍–‍41
Chicago Cubs	82	72	.532	7	49‍–‍28	33‍–‍44
New York Giants	74	77	.490	13½	43‍–‍33	31‍–‍44
Brooklyn Robins	71	82	.464	17½	38‍–‍38	33‍–‍44
Boston Braves	66	86	.434	22	43‍–‍34	23‍–‍52
Philadelphia Phillies	58	93	.384	29½	33‍–‍42	25‍–‍51

Locations of teams for the 1920–1931 National League seasons
National League

== Negro leagues final standings ==
All Negro leagues standings below are per MLB and Seamheads.

=== Eastern Colored League final standings ===
vs. Eastern Colored League						vs. Major Black teams			
Eastern Colored League	W	L	T	Pct.	GB	W	L	T	Pct.
Hilldale Club	52	32	2	.616	—	53	33	2	.614
Atlantic City Bacharach Giants	43	28	1	.604	2½	43	29	2	.595
Cuban Stars (East)	29	22	0	.569	6½	29	22	0	.569
Harrisburg Giants	27	22	0	.551	7½	27	22	0	.551
New York Lincoln Giants	21	30	1	.413	14½	22	31	1	.417
Baltimore Black Sox	22	38	2	.371	18	22	38	2	.371
Brooklyn Royal Giants	11	24	0	.314	16½	11	24	0	.314
Newark Stars†	1	10	0	.091	14½	1	10	0	.091

†Newark folds mid-season before the conclusion of the season.

Locations of teams for the 1926 Eastern Colored League season
Eastern Colored League

=== Negro National League final standings ===
This was the second season in which a playoff was held to determine the pennant, for which the first half leader would be matched against the second half winner. Kansas City won the first half while Chicago won the second half. As such, they met for a best-of-nine Championship Series. Chicago would win the series in nine games to win their fourth pennant.

vs. Negro National League						vs. Major Black teams			
Negro National League	W	L	T	Pct.	GB	W	L	T	Pct.
^{(1)} Kansas City Monarchs	57	21	0	.731	—	60	22	0	.732
^{(2)} Chicago American Giants	56	24	2	.695	2	57	24	3	.696
St. Louis Stars	55	29	1	.653	5	61	35	2	.633
Detroit Stars	52	45	1	.536	14½	52	47	1	.525
Indianapolis ABCs	38	47	1	.448	22½	40	50	1	.445
Cuban Stars (West)	19	49	0	.279	33	19	49	0	.279
Cleveland Elites†	8	40	1	.173	34	8	41	1	.170
Dayton Marcos§	6	36	0	.143	33	6	36	0	.143

^{(1)} First half champion ^{(2)} Second half champion
†Cleveland folds mid-season before the conclusion of the season.
§Dayton departs mid-season as an independent team, before the conclusion of the season.

Locations of teams for the 1926 Negro National League season
Negro National League
Traveling team: Cuban Stars (West)

=== Independent teams final standings ===
The Homestead Grays were not a part of any league but were considered major-league tier.

vs. All Teams
Independent Clubs	W	L	T	Pct.	GB
Homestead Grays	2	0	1	.833	—

== Events ==
- January 15 – The Cincinnati Reds purchase the contract of first baseman Wally Pipp from the New York Yankees for $7,500.
- February 6 – The St. Louis Browns acquire catcher Wally Schang from the New York Yankees in exchange for pitcher George Mogridge and cash considerations. Although Schang is 36 years old, he will hold the job as the regular catcher for the Browns for the next four seasons.
- April 13
  - In one of the greatest Opening Day pitchers' duels ever, Walter Johnson of the Washington Senators defeats Eddie Rommel and the Philadelphia Athletics, 1–0, in a 15-inning battle. Johnson strikes out nine and gives up just six hits.
  - Future Hall of Famers Tony Lazzeri and Paul Waner made their debuts in the Major Leagues. Lazzeri with the New York Yankees, in a 12–11 victory against the Boston Red Sox, while Waner does the same with the Pittsburgh Pirates in a 7–6 loss to the St. Louis Cardinals.
- April 19 – Boston Red Sox center fielder Ira Flagstead ties a Major League record by starting three double plays in one game from the outfield.
- April 27 – Future Hall of Famer Mel Ott makes his major league debut with the New York Giants and strikes out in his only at-bat.
- April 27 – Walter Johnson of the Washington Senators records his 400th career win when he defeats the Boston Red Sox, 9-1, to reach the rarely achieved milestone.
- April 29 – Future Hall of Famer Joe Cronin makes his major league debut with the Pittsburgh Pirates a 16–9 loss to the Cincinnati Reds at Forbes Field.
- May 1 Satchel Paige makes his professional baseball debut. Pitching for the Chattanooga Black Lookouts, Paige pitches a complete game, giving up just two hits in a 1–0 win over the New Orleans Algiers.
- May 8 – The left field bleachers and grand stand roof at Fenway Park are lost in a three alarm fire. The cash strapped Red Sox use the insurance money to pay for operations, leaving a vacant lot where the bleachers once were.
- May 22 – The contest between the Detroit Tigers and Washington Senators is called after eight innings, resulting in a 6–6 tie.
- May 26 – The New York Yankees defeat the Boston Red Sox, 9–8, for their sixteenth victory in row.
- June 14 – John McGraw, manager of the New York Giants trades outfielder Billy Southworth to the St. Louis Cardinals for outfielder Heinie Muller. The trade is a flop. Southworth goes on to become a member of the "Gashouse Gang" in St. Louis and becomes part of a dynasty. Mueller struggles at the plate and leaves the Giants after two unproductive seasons.
- June 24 – At Sportsman's Park, the St. Louis Cardinals and Pittsburgh Pirates play to a 3–3 tie.
- July 4 – The contest between the New York Yankees and Washington Senators is called after six innings, resulting in a 4–4 tie. It is Washington's second tie of the season.
- August 11 – Tris Speaker of the Cleveland Indians hits his 700th career double, but Cleveland loses to the Chicago White Sox, 7–2. The double came in the third inning off Sox pitcher Joe Edwards.
- August 21 – Ted Lyons pitches a no-hitter in a 6–0 Chicago White Sox win over the Boston Red Sox.
- August 26 – Dutch Levsen of the Cleveland Indians becomes the last pitcher to win both games of a doubleheader, hurling two 9 inning games back to back, winning 6–1 and 5–1. Levsen is also the last pitcher to throw two nine-inning complete games on the same day.
- September 8 – Hal Wiltse and the Boston Red Sox defeat the New York Yankees, 5–2, to end their seventeen-game losing streak.
- September 15 – At Dunn Field, the New York Yankees defeat the Cleveland Indians, 6–4. Nevertheless, the Indians take four of the six-game series to reduce the Yankees' lead in the American League to 3½ games from its peak of eleven.
- September 23 – After fifteen innings, the contest between the Cincinnati Reds and Philadelphia Phillies at the Baker Bowl is called a 6–6 tie.
- September 25 – Excluding the tie on the 23rd, the Cincinnati Reds lose their sixth game in a row, 6–1, against the Philadelphia Phillies. Meanwhile, the St. Louis Cardinals, who had been playing poorly themselves, clinch the National League title.
- September 26 – The Philadelphia Athletics take their third game in a row from the Cleveland Indians, relegating them to the second place in the American League two games behind the New York Yankees.
- October 2 – After scoring a run in the first inning on two hits, the St. Louis Cardinals are held hitless for the next seven innings by Herb Pennock. Jim Bottomley singles in the ninth, but is left stranded as the New York Yankees win Game One of the 1926 World Series, 2–1.
- October 3 – Grover Cleveland Alexander gives up two runs to the Yankees in the second inning, but sets down the last 21 batters, striking out 10, in Game Two of the World Series. A three-run home run by Billy Southworth breaks a 2–2 tie, while Tommy Thevenow collect three hits for a 6–2 Cardinals win.
- October 5 – In Game Three of the World Series, Jesse Haines pitches a five-hit shutout and hits a three-run home run as the Cardinals beat the Yankees, 4–0, to take a 2–1 lead in the Series.
- October 6 – Babe Ruth hits three home runs to lead the Yankees to a 10–5 victory over St. Louis in Game Four of the World Series to tie the Series at two games apiece. His first inning curtain-raiser is a majestic 395-footer, exiting Sportsman's Park over its right field bleacher roof. His second homer clears the roof in right center, carrying 515 feet, breaking a window on the other side of Grand Avenue. Ruth's final foray, however, is the main attraction, carrying deep into the never-before reached centerfield bleachers, far beyond the 430-foot mark. Estimated at 530 feet, it is still deemed, as of April 2012, the longest home run in World Series history. On October 18, 1977, Reggie Jackson became the second player in history to hit three home runs during a single World Series game. On October 27, 2011, Albert Pujols became the third player in history to hit three home runs in single World Series game.
- October 7 – Mark Koenig scores on a sacrifice fly by Tony Lazzeri in the tenth inning, giving the Yankees the 3–2 victory in Game Five of the World Series, to take a 3–2 lead in the Series.
- October 9 – Grover Cleveland Alexander scatters eight hits in Game Six of the World Series, while St. Louis tee off New York at Yankee Stadium for a 10–2 romp that sends the Series to a seventh game.
- October 10 – The St. Louis Cardinals defeat the New York Yankees, 3–2, in the decisive Game Seven of the World Series to clinch their first World Championship. One day after picking up his second complete-game victory of the Series, 39-year-old Grover Cleveland Alexander saves the game after fanning Tony Lazzeri with the bases loaded in the seventh inning, then proceeding to no-hit New York the rest of the way. The Series would feature thirteen future Hall of Famers. The series ends when Babe Ruth is thrown out trying to steal second base making it the only World Series to end on a caught stealing to this day.
- November 30 – Bill Carrigan, popular Boston Red Sox manager who won World Series pennants for the team in 1915 and 1916, is drafted out of retirement in an attempt to resurrect the moribund Red Sox.
- December 5 – St. Louis Cardinals catcher Bob O'Farrell is named National League MVP. O'Farrell hit .293 in 146 games and polls 79 points. Cincinnati Reds second baseman Hughie Critz is runner-up with 60 and Pittsburgh Pirates pitcher Ray Kremer (20–6, 2.61 ERA) is third with 32. Critz set a major-league record handling 588 assists, which will be topped by Frankie Frisch with 643 in 1927.
- December 20 – Rogers Hornsby is traded by the St. Louis Cardinals to the New York Giants in exchange for Frankie Frisch and Jimmy Ring.

== Births ==
=== January ===
- January 2 – Stan Hollmig
- January 3 – Harry Fisher
- January 6 – Ralph Branca
- January 8 – Dick Lajeskie
- January 10 – George Strickland
- January 18 – Bob Scherbarth
- January 23 – Chico Carrasquel
- January 25 – Frances Janssen
- January 26 – La Ferne Price
- January 27 – Bob Borkowski
- January 31 – Tom Alston

=== February ===
- February 5 – Hank Workman
- February 6 – Sam Calderone
- February 6 – Dale Long
- February 7 – Mary Flaherty
- February 7 – Jerry Lane
- February 7 – Danny Lynch
- February 10 – Randy Jackson
- February 12 – Joe Garagiola
- February 12 – Ruth Williams
- February 13 – Bob Habenicht
- February 15 – Bubba Harris
- February 16 – Howie Judson
- February 17 – Jack Crimian
- February 27 – Audrey Kissel

=== March ===
- March 2 – Joe Taylor
- March 4 – Cass Michaels
- March 8 – Dick Teed
- March 18 – Dick Littlefield
- March 22 – Billy Goodman
- March 30 – Dick Koecher

=== April ===
- April 1 – Jake Thies
- April 3 – Alex Grammas
- April 6 – Ed White
- April 8 – Pauline Dennert
- April 12 – Walt Moryn
- April 12 – Lou Possehl
- April 15 – Bill Pierro
- April 17 – Helene Machado
- April 26 – Stanley Glenn
- April 26 – Ruth Kramer

=== May ===
- May 3 – Stan Jok
- May 4 – Bert Thiel
- May 6 – Dick Cole
- May 9 – Ray Medeiros
- May 12 – Rose Folder
- May 15 – Fred Baczewski
- May 16 – Rube Walker
- May 17 – Irvin Castille
- May 19 – Mike Kume
- May 21 – Elmer Sexauer
- May 24 – Willy Miranda
- May 27 – Harvey Gentry
- May 28 – Frank Saucier
- May 30 – Kathleen Malach
- May 30 – Dixie Upright

=== June ===
- June 1 – Ray Moore
- June 2 – Frank Verdi
- June 7 – Roy Jarvis
- June 9 – Roy Smalley Jr.
- June 13 – Jeanne Gilchrist
- June 14 – Don Newcombe
- June 16 – Bob Miller
- June 27 – Al Porto
- June 29 – Bobby Morgan

=== July ===
- July 5 – Roy Hawes
- July 5 – Mario Picone
- July 7 – Mel Clark
- July 7 – George Spencer
- July 8 – Gene Patton
- July 10 – Harry MacPherson
- July 15 – Jesse Levan
- July 23 – Johnny Groth
- July 25 – Whitey Lockman
- July 26 – Bobby Herrera
- July 27 – Doris Satterfield

=== August ===
- August 1 – Erma Keyes
- August 3 – Christine Jewitt
- August 6 – Clem Labine
- August 6 – Ralph Schwamb
- August 10 – Elizabeth Farrow
- August 15 – Jim Goodwin
- August 15 – Barney Schultz
- August 16 – Shirley Danz
- August 25 – Bob Milliken
- August 25 – Jim Suchecki
- August 26 – Frank Barnes
- August 26 – Alva Jo Fischer
- August 28 – Bob Trice
- August 29 – Al Naples
- August 31 – Ruth Roberts

=== September ===
- September 8 – Lou Sleater
- September 9 – Ed Mickelson
- September 10 – Helen Westerman
- September 11 – Lois Bellman
- September 11 – Eddie Miksis
- September 12 – George Freese
- September 16 – Kurt Krieger
- September 16 – Roger McKee
- September 19 – Duke Snider
- September 19 – Murray Wall
- September 26 – Mel McGaha
- September 28 – Ozzie Van Brabant
- September 30 – Robin Roberts

=== October ===
- October 4 – Senaida Wirth
- October 11 – Joe Ginsberg
- October 12 – John Kennedy
- October 13 – Eddie Yost
- October 15 – Don Carlsen
- October 20 – Leon Brinkopf
- October 24 – Beverly Dustrude
- October 26 – Dick Bokelmann
- October 28 – Bowie Kuhn
- October 28 – Rudy Rufer

=== November ===
- November 6 – Harley Hisner
- November 10 – Carmen Mauro
- November 11 – Jacquelyn Kelley
- November 12 – Don Johnson
- November 13 – Steve Lembo
- November 16 – Amy Irene Applegren
- November 17 – Naomi Meier
- November 18 – Roy Sievers
- November 19 – Bob Thorpe
- November 22 – Lew Burdette
- November 23 – Charlie Osgood

=== December ===
- December 3 – Al Corwin
- December 4 – Julie Gutz
- December 7 – Armando Roche
- December 10 – Leo Cristante
- December 11 – Johnny Gray
- December 13 – Carl Erskine
- December 17 – Ray Jablonski
- December 25 – Dick Manville
- December 29 – Tom Upton

== Deaths ==
=== January–February ===
- January 12 – Michael Campbell, 76[?], Irish first baseman for the 1873 Elizabeth Resolutes of the National Association of Professional Base Ball Players.
- January 27 – Bill McCauley, 56, shortstop for the 1895 Washington Senators of the National League.
- January 31 – Lou Bierbauer, 60, second baseman for Philadelphia and Pittsburgh teams who batted .300 three times, while leading the National League in fielding percentage in the 1892 season.
- February 10 – Frank J. Farrell, 60, New York City politician prominent in horse-racing circles who, with William Stephen Devery, bought the original Baltimore Orioles of the American League in 1902, moved them to New York as the Highlanders in 1903, and sold them (as the New York Yankees) to Jacob Ruppert and Tillinghast L'Hommedieu Huston in 1915.
- February 10 – Charlie Krehmeyer, 62, catcher and outfielder who played from to 1885 for the NL St. Louis Browns, AA Louisville Colonels and UA St. Louis Maroons.
- February 12 – Francis Richter, 72, sportswriter, editor of annual Reach Guides since 1901, revered for his authoritative commentary on the state of the sport; established first newspaper sports department in 1872, founded Sporting Life newspaper in 1883; helped form 1882 American Association, assisted in 1891 merger with the National League, while renouncing NL presidency in 1907.
- February 14 – Gil Whitehouse, 32, right fielder for the 1912 Boston Braves (NL) and the 1915 Newark Peppers (FL).
- February 20 – Ed High, 52, pitcher for the 1901 Detroit Tigers of the American League.
- February 23 – Hi Church, 62, outfielder for the 1890 Brooklyn Gladiators of the American Association.
- February 24 – Eddie Plank, 50, Hall of Fame pitcher for the Philadelphia Athletics from 1901 to 1914, who became the first left-hander to win 200 games, continuing until he had compiled 326 victories, including eight 20-win seasons, a two-hit victory in final game of 1913 World Series, 2246 strikeouts and 69 shutouts, being the top left-hander with 410 complete games, and setting American League career marks for left-handers in games, innings and starts.
- February 25 – Otto Hess, 47, Swiss pitcher who played for the AL Cleveland Bronchos/Naps (1902–1908) and the NL Boston Braves (1912–1915).
- February 27 – Otis Clymer, 50, right fielder for the Senators, Pirates, Cubs and Braves in six seasons between 1905 and 1913.

=== March–May ===
- March 8 – Howard Armstrong, 36, pitcher for the AL Philadelphia Athletics during the 1911 season.
- March 19 – Wild Bill Hutchison, 66, pitcher for the Colts, White Stockings, Browns and Cowboys between 1884 and 1897, who led the National League in wins from 1890 to 1892 (41, 44 and 36), averaging 596 innings in each of these seasons, while retiring with a 182–162 record and a 3.59 ERA in 356 games.
- March 27 – Kick Kelly, 69, umpire in the 1880s who officiated in three World Championship Series; played 16 games in 1879 with Syracuse and Troy, also managed Louisville.
- April 1 – Al Martin, 78, second baseman for the Brooklyn Eckfords (1872) and Brooklyn Atlantics (1874–75) of the National Association.
- April 14 – Eddie Fusselback, 69, catcher/outfielder for the 1882 St. Louis Brown Stockings (AA), 1884 Baltimore Monumentals (UA), 1885 Philadelphia Athletics (AA) and 1888 Louisville Colonels (AA).
- April 16 – George Chauncey, 78, owner of the 1890 Brooklyn Ward's Wonders and part-owner of the Brooklyn Grooms (1891–1896).
- April 18 – George Haddock, 59, pitcher for seven seasons from 1888 to 1894, winning 34 games for the 1891 Boston Reds and 29 for the 1892 Brooklyn Grooms.
- April 23 – Henry Schmidt, 52, pitcher for the 1903 Brooklyn Superbas (1903) of the National League.
- April 27 – Charlie Abbey, 59, outfielder who played from 1893 through 1887 with the Washington Senators of the National League.
- May 1 – Ed Conwell, 36, pinch-hitter for the 1911 St. Louis Cardinals.

=== June–August ===
- June 4 – Sandy Griffin, 67, outfielder for the Broncos/Browns/Statesmen/Gothams in parts of four seasons spanning 1884–1893.
- June 13 – Johnny Beall, 44, outfielder for the Cardinals/WhiteSox/Reds/Naps between 1913 and 1918.
- June 18 – Alex Gardner, 65, Canadian catcher for the 1884 Washington Nationals of the American Association.
- June 22 – Joe Crotty, 66, catcher for the Louisville Eclipse, St. Louis Brown Stockings, Cincinnati Outlaw Reds, Louisville Colonels and New York Metropolitans between the 1882 and 1886 seasons.
- June 24 – Jim Gillespie, 64, outfielder for the 1890 Buffalo Bisons of the Players' League.
- August 7 – Moose Baxter, 50, first baseman for the 1907 St. Louis Cardinals.
- August 19 – George Cobb, 60, pitcher for the 1892 Baltimore Orioles of the National League.
- August 20 – Cal McVey, 75, early star with the 1869 Red Stockings who batted .431 in National Association's 1871 debut season, topped .300 mark through 1878; led National League in hits, RBI and total bases twice each, and in runs and doubles once.
- August 23 – Emil Batch, 46, third baseman and left fielder for the Brooklyn Superbas between 1904 and 1907.

=== September–October ===
- September 2 – Ed McDonough, 39, backup catcher for the Philadelphia Phillies from 1909 to 1910.
- September 9 – Dick Conway, 60, pitcher/right fielder for the 1886 Baltimore Orioles and the 1887–1888 Boston Beaneaters.
- September 12 – Danny Richardson, 63, National League infielder/outfielder who played from 1884 through 1894 with the New York Gothams/Giants, Washington Senators and Brooklyn Grooms.
- September 17 – Tom Drohan, 39, pitcher for the 1913 Washington Senators of the American League.
- September 21 – Jim Keenan, 68, catcher/first baseman who played between 1875 and 1891 for the New Haven Elm Citys, Buffalo Bisons, Pittsburgh Alleghenys, Indianapolis Hoosiers, and the Cincinnati Red Stockings/Reds.
- October 2 – Art Sunday, 64, right fielder for the 1890 Brooklyn Ward's Wonders of the Players' League.
- October 5 – Al Burch, 42, outfielder for the St. Louis Cardinals and the Brooklyn Superbas/Dodgers from 1906 to 1911.
- October 5 – Howard Murphy, 44, backup centerfielder for the St. Louis Cardinals in the 1909 season.
- October 6 – Holly Hollingshead, 73, center fielder/second baseman from 1872 to 1873, 1875 and manager in 1875 and 1884, for the National and Blue Legs teams in the Washington, D.C. area.
- October 10 – Brownie Foreman, 51, pitcher for the Pittsburgh Pirates and Cincinnati Reds from 1895 to 1896.
- October 16 – Charlie Levis, 66, first baseman for the Baltimore Monumentals, Washington Nationals, Indianapolis Hoosiers and Baltimore Orioles between 1884 and 1885, and also a minor league player/manager during eight seasons spanning 1883–92.
- October 22 – Jake Aydelott, 65, pitcher/centerfielder for the 1884 Indianapolis Hoosiers and the 1886 Philadelphia Athletics of the American Association.

=== November–December ===
- November 2 – Bill Bailey, 38, pitcher for the St. Louis Browns, Baltimore Terrapins, Chicago Whales, Detroit Tigers and St. Louis Cardinals in parts of 11 seasons spanning 1907–1922.
- November 10 – John Cattanach, 63, pitcher/right fielder who played for the Providence Grays and the St. Louis Maroons in the 1884 season.
- November 10 – Ed Flanagan, 65, first baseman for the 1887 Philadelphia Athletics and the 1889 Louisville Colonels of the American Association.
- November 10 – George Pinkney, 67, a daring base runner and steady third baseman, who played from 1884 to 1893 with the Cleveland Blues, Brooklyn Grays/Bridegrooms/Grooms, St. Louis Browns and Louisville Colonels, collecting a .263 average with 874 runs and 296 stolen bases in 1163 games, while leading the American Association in several statistical categories, including games played (1886, 1888), runs (1888), walks (1886), putouts (1886), assists (1887) and fielding percentage (1887, 1889).
- November 13 – Frank Pearce, 66, pitcher for the 1876 Louisville Grays of the National League.
- November 19 – Fred Smith, 61, pitcher for the 1890 Toledo Maumees of the American Association.
- November 21 – John Shaffer, 62, pitcher who played from 1886 to 1887 for the New York Metropolitans of the American Association.
- December 2 – Dave Skeels, 34, pitcher for the 1919 Detroit Tigers.
- December 4 – Abel Lizotte, 56, first baseman for the 1896 Pittsburgh Pirates.
- December 12 – Ed Sixsmith, 63, catcher for the 1884 Philadelphia Quakers of the National League.
- December 14 – George Myers, 66, National League catcher/outfielder for the Buffalo Bisons, St. Louis Maroons and Indianapolis Hoosiers from 1884 to 1889.
- December 14 – Tom Needham, 47, Irish catcher who played from 1904 through 1914 for the Boston Beaneaters/Doves, New York Giants and Chicago Cubs, collecting a .962 fielding average and a 45% of caught stealing in 465 career games, while gunning down a 60.5% percent of potential base stealers in 1911 to lead the National League.
- December 22 – Harry Weber, 64, backup catcher for the 1884 Indianapolis Hoosiers of the American Association.
- December 26 – William Stecher, 57, pitcher and third baseman for the 1890 Philadelphia Athletics of the American Association.
