= 1926 Major League Baseball season =

1926 MLB season
- League: American League (AL); National League (NL)
- Sport: Baseball
- Duration: Regular season: April 13 – September 27, 1926 (AL); April 13 – September 29, 1926 (NL); World Series: October 2–10, 1926
- Games: 154
- Teams: 16 (8 per league)

Regular Season
- Season MVP: AL: George Burns (CLE); NL: Bob O'Farrell (STL)
- AL champions: New York Yankees
- AL runners-up: Cleveland Indians
- NL champions: St. Louis Cardinals
- NL runners-up: Cincinnati Reds

World Series
- Champions: St. Louis Cardinals
- Runners-up: New York Yankees

MLB seasons
- ← 1925 1927 →

Locations of teams for the 1923–1931 American League seasons
American League
Locations of teams for the 1920–1931 National League seasons
National League

The 1926 major league baseball season began on April 13, 1926. The regular season ended on September 29, with the St. Louis Cardinals and New York Yankees as the regular season champions of the National League and American League, respectively. The postseason began with Game 1 of the 23rd World Series on October 2 and ended with Game 7 on October 10. The Cardinals defeated the Yankees, four games to three, capturing their first championship in franchise history. Going into the season, the defending World Series champions were the Pittsburgh Pirates from the 1925 season.

This was the fifth of eight seasons that "League Awards", a precursor to the Major League Baseball Most Valuable Player Award (introduced in 1931), were issued.

== Schedule ==
The 1926 schedule consisted of 154 games for all teams in the American League and National League, each of which had eight teams. Each team was scheduled to play 22 games against the other seven teams of their respective league. This continued the format put in place since the 1904 season (except for 1919) and would be used until 1961 in the American League and 1962 in the National League.

Opening Day, April 13, featured all sixteen teams, continuing the trend which started with the 1924 season. The American League would see its final day of the regular season on September 27, while the National League would see its final day of the regular season on September 29 with a doubleheader between the Philadelphia Phillies and Boston Braves. The World Series took place between October 2 and October 10.

== Rule changes ==
The 1926 season saw the following rule changes:

- A pitcher is now allowed to use a rosin bag prior to pitching the ball.
- A sacrifice hit is now awarded when any base runner advances on a fly out.

== Teams ==
| League | Team | City | Ballpark | Capacity | Manager |
|---|---|---|---|---|---|
| American League | Boston Red Sox | Boston, Massachusetts | Fenway Park | 27,000 | Lee Fohl |
| American League | Chicago White Sox | Chicago, Illinois | Comiskey Park | 28,000 | Eddie Collins |
| American League | Cleveland Indians | Cleveland, Ohio | Dunn Field | 21,414 | Tris Speaker |
| American League | Detroit Tigers | Detroit, Michigan | Navin Field | 30,000 | Ty Cobb |
| American League | New York Yankees | New York, New York | Yankee Stadium | 58,000 | Miller Huggins |
| American League | Philadelphia Athletics | Philadelphia, Pennsylvania | Shibe Park | 27,500 | Connie Mack |
| American League | St. Louis Browns | St. Louis, Missouri | Sportsman's Park | 34,023 | George Sisler |
| American League | Washington Senators | Washington, D.C. | Griffith Stadium | 27,000 | Bucky Harris |
| National League | Boston Braves | Boston, Massachusetts | Braves Field | 40,000 | Dave Bancroft |
| National League | Brooklyn Robins | New York, New York | Ebbets Field | 28,000 | Wilbert Robinson |
| National League | Chicago Cubs | Chicago, Illinois | Cubs Park | 20,000 | Joe McCarthy |
| National League | Cincinnati Reds | Cincinnati, Ohio | Redland Field | 20,696 | Jack Hendricks |
| National League | New York Giants | New York, New York | Polo Grounds | 55,000 | John McGraw |
| National League | Philadelphia Phillies | Philadelphia, Pennsylvania | Baker Bowl | 18,000 | Art Fletcher |
| National League | Pittsburgh Pirates | Pittsburgh, Pennsylvania | Forbes Field | 41,000 | Bill McKechnie |
| National League | St. Louis Cardinals | St. Louis, Missouri | Sportsman's Park | 34,023 | Rogers Hornsby |

== Standings ==
=== American League ===
American League
| Team | W | L | Pct. | GB | Home | Road |
|---|---|---|---|---|---|---|
| New York Yankees | 91 | 63 | .591 | — | 50‍–‍25 | 41‍–‍38 |
| Cleveland Indians | 88 | 66 | .571 | 3 | 49‍–‍31 | 39‍–‍35 |
| Philadelphia Athletics | 83 | 67 | .553 | 6 | 44‍–‍27 | 39‍–‍40 |
| Washington Senators | 81 | 69 | .540 | 8 | 42‍–‍30 | 39‍–‍39 |
| Chicago White Sox | 81 | 72 | .529 | 9½ | 47‍–‍31 | 34‍–‍41 |
| Detroit Tigers | 79 | 75 | .513 | 12 | 39‍–‍41 | 40‍–‍34 |
| St. Louis Browns | 62 | 92 | .403 | 29 | 40‍–‍39 | 22‍–‍53 |
| Boston Red Sox | 46 | 107 | .301 | 44½ | 25‍–‍51 | 21‍–‍56 |

=== National League ===
National League
| Team | W | L | Pct. | GB | Home | Road |
|---|---|---|---|---|---|---|
| St. Louis Cardinals | 89 | 65 | .578 | — | 47‍–‍30 | 42‍–‍35 |
| Cincinnati Reds | 87 | 67 | .565 | 2 | 53‍–‍23 | 34‍–‍44 |
| Pittsburgh Pirates | 84 | 69 | .549 | 4½ | 49‍–‍28 | 35‍–‍41 |
| Chicago Cubs | 82 | 72 | .532 | 7 | 49‍–‍28 | 33‍–‍44 |
| New York Giants | 74 | 77 | .490 | 13½ | 43‍–‍33 | 31‍–‍44 |
| Brooklyn Robins | 71 | 82 | .464 | 17½ | 38‍–‍38 | 33‍–‍44 |
| Boston Braves | 66 | 86 | .434 | 22 | 43‍–‍34 | 23‍–‍52 |
| Philadelphia Phillies | 58 | 93 | .384 | 29½ | 33‍–‍42 | 25‍–‍51 |

=== Tie games ===
12 tie games (5 in AL, 7 in NL), which are not factored into winning percentage or games behind (and were often replayed again) occurred throughout the season.

==== American League ====
- Boston Red Sox, 1
- Chicago White Sox, 2
- Detroit Tigers, 3
- New York Yankees, 1
- St. Louis Browns, 1
- Washington Senators, 2

==== National League ====
- Boston Braves, 1
- Brooklyn Robins, 2
- Chicago Cubs, 1
- Cincinnati Reds, 3
- Philadelphia Phillies, 1
- Pittsburgh Pirates, 4
- St. Louis Cardinals, 2

== Postseason ==
The postseason began on October 2 and ended on October 10 with the St. Louis Cardinals defeating the New York Yankees in the 1926 World Series in seven games.

=== Bracket ===
| World Series |
| AL | New York Yankees | 3 |
| NL | St. Louis Cardinals | 4 |

== Managerial changes ==
=== Off-season ===
| Team | Former Manager | New Manager |
|---|---|---|
| Chicago Cubs | George Gibson | Joe McCarthy |
| New York Giants | Hughie Jennings | John McGraw |

== League leaders ==
Any team shown in small text indicates a previous team a player was on during the season.

=== American League ===
Hitting leaders
| Stat | Player | Total |
|---|---|---|
| AVG | Heinie Manush (DET) | .378 |
| OPS | Babe Ruth (NYY) | 1.253 |
| HR | Babe Ruth (NYY) | 47 |
| RBI | Babe Ruth (NYY) | 153 |
| R | Babe Ruth (NYY) | 139 |
| H | George Burns (CLE); Sam Rice (WSH) | 216 |
| SB | Johnny Mostil (CWS) | 35 |

Pitching leaders
| Stat | Player | Total |
|---|---|---|
| W | George Uhle (CLE) | 27 |
| L | Milt Gaston (SLB); Paul Zahniser (BOS) | 18 |
| ERA | Lefty Grove (PHA) | 2.51 |
| K | Lefty Grove (PHA) | 194 |
| IP | George Uhle (CLE) | 318.1 |
| SV | Firpo Marberry (WSH) | 22 |
| WHIP | Herb Pennock (NYY) | 1.265 |

=== National League ===
Hitting leaders
| Stat | Player | Total |
|---|---|---|
| AVG | Bubbles Hargrave (CIN) | .353 |
| OPS | Cy Williams (PHI) | .986 |
| HR | Hack Wilson (CHC) | 21 |
| RBI | Jim Bottomley (STL) | 120 |
| R | Kiki Cuyler (PIT) | 113 |
| H | Eddie Brown (BSN) | 201 |
| SB | Kiki Cuyler (PIT) | 35 |

Pitching leaders
| Stat | Player | Total |
|---|---|---|
| W | Pete Donohue (CIN); Ray Kremer (PIT); Lee Meadows (PIT); Flint Rhem (STL) | 20 |
| L | Jesse Petty (BRO); Charlie Root (CHC) | 17 |
| ERA | Ray Kremer (PIT) | 2.61 |
| K | Dazzy Vance (BRO) | 140 |
| IP | Pete Donohue (CIN) | 285.2 |
| SV | Chick Davies (NYG) | 6 |
| WHIP | Grover Alexander (STL/CHC) | 1.108 |

== Milestones ==
=== Batters ===
==== Cycles ====
- Bob Fothergill (DET):
  - Fothergill hit for his first cycle, second in franchise history, and third natural cycle in major league history, in game one of a doubleheader on July 21 against the Boston Red Sox.

==== Other batting accomplishments ====
- Ira Flagstead (BOS):
  - Set an American League record and tied a Major League record (as the third player to do so) for starting three double plays in a single game on game two of a doubleheader April 19 against the Philadelphia Athletics.

=== Pitchers ===
==== No-hitters ====
- Ted Lyons (CWS):
  - Lyons threw his first career no-hitter and the eighth no-hitter in franchise history, by defeating the Boston Red Sox 6–0 on August 21. Vance walked one and struck out two.

==== Other pitching accomplishments ====
- Dutch Levsen (CLE):
  - Became the last pitcher to win both games of a doubleheader on August 28, hurling two 9 inning games against the Boston Red Sox back-to-back, winning 6–1 and 5–1. Levsen is also the last pitcher to throw two nine-inning complete games on the same day.

==== Other pitching accomplishments ====
- Walter Johnson (WSH):
  - Became the second member of the 400-win club, defeating the Boston Red Sox on April 27, winning 9–1.

== Awards and honors ==
- League Award: Bob O'Farrell (STL, National); George Burns (CLE, American)

== Home field attendance ==
| Team name | Wins | %± | Home attendance | %± | Per game |
|---|---|---|---|---|---|
| New York Yankees | 91 | 31.9% | 1,027,675 | 47.4% | 13,702 |
| Chicago Cubs | 82 | 20.6% | 885,063 | 42.2% | 11,347 |
| Pittsburgh Pirates | 84 | −11.6% | 798,542 | −0.7% | 10,108 |
| Philadelphia Athletics | 83 | −5.7% | 714,508 | −17.8% | 10,063 |
| Detroit Tigers | 79 | −2.5% | 711,914 | −13.3% | 8,789 |
| Chicago White Sox | 81 | 2.5% | 710,339 | −14.6% | 8,992 |
| New York Giants | 74 | −14.0% | 700,362 | −10.1% | 9,215 |
| Cincinnati Reds | 87 | 8.8% | 672,987 | 44.8% | 8,740 |
| St. Louis Cardinals | 89 | 15.6% | 668,428 | 65.1% | 8,461 |
| Brooklyn Robins | 71 | 4.4% | 650,819 | −1.3% | 8,563 |
| Cleveland Indians | 88 | 25.7% | 627,426 | 49.7% | 7,843 |
| Washington Senators | 81 | −15.6% | 551,580 | −32.5% | 7,454 |
| Boston Braves | 66 | −5.7% | 303,598 | −3.2% | 3,943 |
| Boston Red Sox | 46 | −2.1% | 285,155 | 6.5% | 3,703 |
| St. Louis Browns | 62 | −24.4% | 283,986 | −38.7% | 3,595 |
| Philadelphia Phillies | 58 | −14.7% | 240,600 | −21.1% | 3,166 |

== See also ==
- 1926 in baseball (Events, Births, Deaths)
