= 1925 Boston Braves season =

1925 Boston Braves
- League: National League
- Ballpark: Braves Field
- City: Boston, Massachusetts
- Record: 53–68 (.438)
- League place: 5th
- Owners: Emil Fuchs, Christy Mathewson
- Managers: Dave Bancroft
- Radio: WNAC (Fred Hoey)

The 1925 Boston Braves season was the 55th season of the franchise.

== Offseason ==
- February 4, 1925: Cotton Tierney was traded by the Braves to the Brooklyn Robins for Bernie Neis.

== Regular season ==
=== Season standings ===
National League
Team	W	L	Pct.	GB	Home	Road
Pittsburgh Pirates	95	58	.621	—	52‍–‍25	43‍–‍33
New York Giants	86	66	.566	8½	47‍–‍29	39‍–‍37
Cincinnati Reds	80	73	.523	15	44‍–‍32	36‍–‍41
St. Louis Cardinals	77	76	.503	18	48‍–‍28	29‍–‍48
Boston Braves	70	83	.458	25	37‍–‍39	33‍–‍44
Brooklyn Robins	68	85	.444	27	38‍–‍39	30‍–‍46
Philadelphia Phillies	68	85	.444	27	40‍–‍37	28‍–‍48
Chicago Cubs	68	86	.442	27½	37‍–‍40	31‍–‍46

=== Record vs. opponents ===
1925 National League record Sources:
Team	BSN	BRO	CHC	CIN	NYG	PHI	PIT	STL
Boston	—	13–8	12–10	9–13	11–11	6–16	7–15	12–10
Brooklyn	8–13	—	11–11	12–10	10–12	11–11	5–17	11–11
Chicago	10–12	11–11	—	10–12	7–15	10–12	12–10	8–14
Cincinnati	13–9	10–12	12–10	—	9–13	16–6	8–13	12–10
New York	11–11	12–10	15–7	13–9	—	13–8	10–12	12–9
Philadelphia	16–6	11–11	12–10	6–16	8–13	—	8–14	7–15
Pittsburgh	15–7	17–5	10–12	13–8	12–10	14–8	—	14–8
St. Louis	10–12	11–11	14–8	10–12	9–12	15–7	8–14	—

=== Notable transactions ===
- June 18, 1925: Shanty Hogan was signed by the Braves as an amateur free agent.
- October 6, 1925: Gus Felix, Jesse Barnes and Mickey O'Neil were traded by the Braves to the Brooklyn Robins for Zack Taylor, Jimmy Johnston, and Eddie Brown.

=== Roster ===
1925 Boston Braves
Roster
Pitchers: Bill Anderson; Jesse Barnes; Joe Batchelder; Larry Benton; Johnny Cooney; Foster Edwards; Joe Genewich; Skinny Graham; Ike Kamp; Rube Marquard; Tim McNamara; Joe Ogrodowski; Rosy Ryan; Bill Vargus	Catchers: Dee Cousineau; Frank Gibson; Mickey O'Neil; Oscar Siemer; Infielders: Dave Bancroft; Dick Burrus; Doc Gautreau; Andy High; Abie Hood; Hod Kibbie; Red Lucas; William Marriott; Ernie Padgett; Bob Smith; Herb Thomas	Outfielders: Gus Felix; Dave Harris; Shanty Hogan; Les Mann; Bernie Neis; Casey Stengel; Jimmy Welsh; Frank Wilson; Other batters: Ed Sperber	Manager: Dave Bancroft

== Player stats ==
=== Batting ===
==== Starters by position ====
Note: Pos = Position; G = Games played; AB = At bats; H = Hits; Avg. = Batting average; HR = Home runs; RBI = Runs batted in

Pos	Player	G	AB	H	Avg.	HR	RBI
C	Frank Gibson	104	316	88	.278	2	50
1B	Dick Burrus	152	588	200	.340	5	87
2B	Doc Gautreau	68	279	73	.262	0	23
SS	Dave Bancroft	128	479	153	.319	2	49
3B	William Marriott	103	390	99	.268	1	40
OF	Jimmy Welsh	122	484	151	.312	7	63
OF	Gus Felix	121	459	141	.307	2	66
OF	Dave Harris	92	340	90	.265	5	36

==== Other batters ====
Note: G = Games played; AB = At bats; H = Hits; Avg. = Batting average; HR = Home runs; RBI = Runs batted in

Player	G	AB	H	Avg.	HR	RBI
Bernie Neis	106	355	101	.285	5	45
Ernie Padgett	86	256	78	.305	0	29
Mickey O'Neil	70	222	57	.257	2	30
Andy High	60	219	63	.288	4	28
Leslie Mann	60	184	63	.342	2	20
Bob Smith	58	174	49	.282	0	23
Oscar Siemer	16	46	14	.304	1	6
Hod Kibbie	11	41	11	.268	0	2
Frank Wilson	12	31	13	.419	0	0
Shanty Hogan	9	21	6	.286	0	3
Abie Hood	5	21	6	.286	1	2
Red Lucas	6	20	3	.150	0	2
Herb Thomas	5	17	4	.235	0	0
Casey Stengel	12	13	1	.077	0	2
Ed Sperber	2	2	0	.000	0	0
Dee Cousineau	1	0	0	----	0	0

=== Pitching ===
==== Starting pitchers ====
Note: G = Games pitched; IP = Innings pitched; W = Wins; L = Losses; ERA = Earned run average; SO = Strikeouts

Player	G	IP	W	L	ERA	SO
Johnny Cooney	31	245.2	14	14	3.48	65
Jesse Barnes	32	216.1	11	16	4.53	55
Larry Benton	31	183.1	14	7	3.09	49
Bob Smith	13	92.2	5	3	4.47	19

==== Other pitchers ====
Note: G = Games pitched; IP = Innings pitched; W = Wins; L = Losses; ERA = Earned run average; SO = Strikeouts

Player	G	IP	W	L	ERA	SO
Joe Genewich	34	169.0	12	10	3.99	34
Kyle Graham	34	157.0	7	12	4.41	32
Rosy Ryan	37	122.2	2	8	6.31	48
Rube Marquard	26	72.0	2	8	5.75	19
Ike Kamp	24	58.1	2	4	5.09	20
Bill Vargus	11	36.1	1	1	3.96	5

==== Relief pitchers ====
Note: G = Games pitched; W = Wins; L = Losses; SV = Saves; ERA = Earned run average; SO = Strikeouts

Player	G	W	L	SV	ERA	SO
Joe Batchelder	4	0	0	0	5.14	2
Bill Anderson	2	0	0	0	10.13	1
Foster Edwards	1	0	0	0	9.00	1
Joe Ogrodowski	1	0	0	0	54.00	0
Tim McNamara	1	0	0	0	81.00	1
