= 1924 Boston Braves season =

1924 Boston Braves
- League: National League
- Ballpark: Braves Field
- City: Boston, Massachusetts
- Record: 53–100 (.346)
- League place: 8th
- Owners: Emil Fuchs, Christy Mathewson
- Managers: Dave Bancroft (1st Season)

The 1924 Boston Braves season was the 54th season of the franchise. The Braves finished eighth place in the National League with a record of 53 wins and 100 losses.

== Offseason ==
- December 15, 1923: Hod Ford and Ray Powell were traded by the Braves to the Philadelphia Phillies for Cotton Tierney. Ray Powell reported to his new team with a bad leg in April 1924, and he was sent back to Boston under the terms of the trade agreement. The Braves sent cash to the Phillies to complete the trade.

== Regular season ==
=== Season standings ===
National League
Team	W	L	Pct.	GB	Home	Road
New York Giants	93	60	.608	—	51‍–‍26	42‍–‍34
Brooklyn Robins	92	62	.597	1½	46‍–‍31	46‍–‍31
Pittsburgh Pirates	90	63	.588	3	49‍–‍28	41‍–‍35
Cincinnati Reds	83	70	.542	10	43‍–‍33	40‍–‍37
Chicago Cubs	81	72	.529	12	46‍–‍31	35‍–‍41
St. Louis Cardinals	65	89	.422	28½	40‍–‍37	25‍–‍52
Philadelphia Phillies	55	96	.364	37	26‍–‍49	29‍–‍47
Boston Braves	53	100	.346	40	28‍–‍48	25‍–‍52

=== Record vs. opponents ===
1924 National League record Sources:
Team	BSN	BRO	CHC	CIN	NYG	PHI	PIT	STL
Boston	—	7–15	6–15	12–10	5–17	10–12–1	7–15	6–16
Brooklyn	15–7	—	12–10	12–10	8–14	17–5	13–9	15–7
Chicago	15–6	10–12	—	9–13	9–13–1	16–6	7–15	15–7
Cincinnati	10–12	10–12	13–9	—	9–13	16–5	12–10	13–9
New York	17–5	14–8	13–9–1	13–9	—	14–7	9–13	13–9
Philadelphia	12–10–1	5–17	6–16	5–16	7–14	—	8–13	12–10
Pittsburgh	15–7	9–13	15–7	10–12	13–9	13–8	—	15–7
St. Louis	16–6	7–15	7–15	9–13	9–13	10–12	7–15	—

=== Roster ===
1924 Boston Braves roster
Roster
Pitchers: Jesse Barnes; Joe Batchelder; Larry Benton; Johnny Cooney; Dinty Gearin; Joe Genewich; Skinny Graham; Ike Kamp; Red Lucas; Rube Marquard; Tim McNamara; Joe Muich; Lou North; Dutch Stryker; Al Yeargin	Catchers: Dee Cousineau; Frank Gibson; Mickey O'Neil; Eddie Phillips; Earl Smith; Infielders: Dave Bancroft; Hunter Lane; Stuffy McInnis; Ernie Padgett; Marty Shay; Bob Smith; Cotton Tierney	Outfielders: Bill Cunningham; Gus Felix; Les Mann; Ray Powell; Ed Sperber; Casey Stengel; Herb Thomas; Frank Wilson; Other batters: Walton Cruise; Al Hermann; John Kelleher; Wade Lefler	Manager: Dave Bancroft

== Player stats ==
=== Batting ===
==== Starters by position ====
Note: Pos = Position; G = Games played; AB = At bats; H = Hits; Avg. = Batting average; HR = Home runs; RBI = Runs batted in

Pos	Player	G	AB	H	Avg.	HR	RBI
C	Mickey O'Neil	106	362	89	.246	0	22
1B	Stuffy McInnis	146	581	169	.291	1	59
2B	Cotton Tierney	136	505	131	.259	6	58
SS	Dave Bancroft	79	319	89	.279	2	21
3B	Ernie Padgett	138	502	128	.255	1	46
OF	Casey Stengel	131	461	129	.280	5	39
OF	Bill Cunningham	114	437	119	.272	1	40
OF	Frank Wilson	61	215	51	.237	1	15

==== Other batters ====
Note: G = Games played; AB = At bats; H = Hits; Avg. = Batting average; HR = Home runs; RBI = Runs batted in

Player	G	AB	H	Avg.	HR	RBI
Bob Smith	106	347	79	.228	2	38
Frank Gibson	90	229	71	.310	1	30
Gus Felix	59	204	43	.211	1	10
Ray Powell	74	188	49	.261	1	15
Herb Thomas	32	127	28	.220	1	8
Leslie Mann	32	102	28	.275	0	10
Marty Shay	19	68	16	.235	0	2
Earl Smith	33	59	16	.271	0	8
Ed Sperber	24	59	17	.288	1	12
Hunter Lane	7	15	1	.067	0	0
Walton Cruise	9	9	4	.444	1	3
Eddie Phillips	3	3	0	.000	0	0
Dee Cousineau	3	2	0	.000	0	0
Wade Lefler	1	1	0	.000	0	0
John Kelleher	1	1	0	.000	0	0
Al Hermann	1	1	0	.000	0	0

=== Pitching ===
==== Starting pitchers ====
Note: G = Games pitched; IP = Innings pitched; W = Wins; L = Losses; ERA = Earned run average; SO = Strikeouts

Player	G	IP	W	L	ERA	SO
Jesse Barnes	37	267.2	15	20	3.23	49
Joe Genewich	34	200.1	10	19	5.21	43
Rube Marquard	6	36.0	1	2	3.00	10
Skinny Graham	5	33.0	0	4	3.82	15
Ike Kamp	1	7.0	0	1	5.14	4
Dinty Gearin	1	0.0	0	1	inf	0

==== Other pitchers ====
Note: G = Games pitched; IP = Innings pitched; W = Wins; L = Losses; ERA = Earned run average; SO = Strikeouts

Player	G	IP	W	L	ERA	SO
Johnny Cooney	34	181.0	8	9	3.18	67
Tim McNamara	35	179.0	8	12	5.18	35
Al Yeargin	32	141.1	1	11	5.09	34
Larry Benton	30	128.0	5	7	4.15	41
Dutch Stryker	20	73.1	3	8	6.01	22
Lou North	9	35.1	1	2	5.35	11

==== Relief pitchers ====
Note: G = Games pitched; W = Wins; L = Losses; SV = Saves; ERA = Earned run average; SO = Strikeouts

Player	G	W	L	SV	ERA	SO
Red Lucas	27	1	4	0	5.16	30
Joe Muich	3	0	0	0	11.00	1
Joe Batchelder	3	0	0	0	3.86	2
