= 1926 Boston Braves season =

1926 Boston Braves
- League: National League
- Ballpark: Braves Field
- City: Boston, Massachusetts
- Record: 66–86 (.434)
- League place: 7th
- Owners: Emil Fuchs
- Managers: Dave Bancroft
- Radio: WNAC (Fred Hoey)

The 1926 Boston Braves season was the 56th season of the franchise.

== Regular season ==
=== Season standings ===
National League
| Team | W | L | Pct. | GB | Home | Road |
|---|---|---|---|---|---|---|
| St. Louis Cardinals | 89 | 65 | .578 | — | 47‍–‍30 | 42‍–‍35 |
| Cincinnati Reds | 87 | 67 | .565 | 2 | 53‍–‍23 | 34‍–‍44 |
| Pittsburgh Pirates | 84 | 69 | .549 | 4½ | 49‍–‍28 | 35‍–‍41 |
| Chicago Cubs | 82 | 72 | .532 | 7 | 49‍–‍28 | 33‍–‍44 |
| New York Giants | 74 | 77 | .490 | 13½ | 43‍–‍33 | 31‍–‍44 |
| Brooklyn Robins | 71 | 82 | .464 | 17½ | 38‍–‍38 | 33‍–‍44 |
| Boston Braves | 66 | 86 | .434 | 22 | 43‍–‍34 | 23‍–‍52 |
| Philadelphia Phillies | 58 | 93 | .384 | 29½ | 33‍–‍42 | 25‍–‍51 |

=== Record vs. opponents ===
1926 National League record Sources:
| Team | BSN | BRO | CHC | CIN | NYG | PHI | PIT | STL |
|---|---|---|---|---|---|---|---|---|
| Boston | — | 6–15 | 12–10 | 12–10–1 | 12–10 | 7–15 | 10–11 | 7–15 |
| Brooklyn | 15–6 | — | 14–8 | 4–18 | 9–13 | 13–9 | 9–13–2 | 7–15 |
| Chicago | 10–12 | 8–14 | — | 13–9–1 | 14–8 | 16–6 | 10–12 | 11–11 |
| Cincinnati | 10–12–1 | 18–4 | 9–13–1 | — | 7–15 | 16–6–1 | 13–9 | 14–8 |
| New York | 10–12 | 13–9 | 8–14 | 15–7 | — | 12–7 | 6–16 | 10–12 |
| Philadelphia | 15–7 | 9–13 | 6–16 | 6–16–1 | 7–12 | — | 8–14 | 7–15 |
| Pittsburgh | 11–10 | 13–9–2 | 12–10 | 9–13 | 16–6 | 14–8 | — | 9–13–2 |
| St. Louis | 15–7 | 15–7 | 11–11 | 8–14 | 12–10 | 15–7 | 13–9–2 | — |

=== Roster ===
1926 Boston Braves
Roster
| Pitchers: Larry Benton; Foster Edwards; Joe Genewich; Hal Goldsmith; Skinny Graham; Bunny Hearn; George Mogridge; Rosy Ryan; Bob Smith; Bill Vargus; Johnny Werts | Catchers: Frank Gibson; Shanty Hogan; Oscar Siemer; Zack Taylor; Sid Womack; Infielders: Dave Bancroft; Dick Burrus; Johnny Cooney; Doc Gautreau; Andy High; Jimmy Johnston; Eddie Moore; Harry Riconda; Ed Taylor | Outfielders: Eddie Brown; Les Mann; Bernie Neis; Jack Smith; Jimmy Welsh; Frank Wilson | Manager: Dave Bancroft |

== Player stats ==
=== Batting ===
==== Starters by position ====
Note: Pos = Position; G = Games played; AB = At bats; H = Hits; Avg. = Batting average; HR = Home runs; RBI = Runs batted in

| Pos | Player | G | AB | H | Avg. | HR | RBI |
|---|---|---|---|---|---|---|---|
| C | Zack Taylor | 125 | 432 | 110 | .255 | 0 | 42 |
| 1B | Dick Burrus | 131 | 486 | 131 | .270 | 3 | 61 |
| 2B | Doc Gautreau | 79 | 266 | 71 | .267 | 0 | 8 |
| SS | Dave Bancroft | 127 | 453 | 141 | .311 | 1 | 44 |
| 3B | Andy High | 130 | 476 | 141 | .296 | 2 | 66 |
| OF | Jack Smith | 96 | 322 | 100 | .311 | 2 | 25 |
| OF | Eddie Brown | 153 | 612 | 201 | .328 | 2 | 84 |
| OF | Jimmy Welsh | 134 | 490 | 136 | .278 | 3 | 57 |

==== Other batters ====
Note: G = Games played; AB = At bats; H = Hits; Avg. = Batting average; HR = Home runs; RBI = Runs batted in

| Player | G | AB | H | Avg. | HR | RBI |
|---|---|---|---|---|---|---|
| Ed Taylor | 92 | 272 | 73 | .268 | 0 | 33 |
| Frank Wilson | 87 | 236 | 56 | .237 | 0 | 23 |
| Eddie Moore | 54 | 184 | 49 | .266 | 0 | 15 |
| Leslie Mann | 50 | 129 | 39 | .302 | 1 | 20 |
| Johnny Cooney | 64 | 126 | 38 | .302 | 0 | 18 |
| Bernie Neis | 30 | 93 | 20 | .215 | 0 | 8 |
| Oscar Siemer | 31 | 73 | 15 | .205 | 0 | 5 |
| Jimmy Johnston | 23 | 57 | 14 | .246 | 1 | 5 |
| Frank Gibson | 24 | 47 | 16 | .340 | 0 | 7 |
| Shanty Hogan | 4 | 14 | 4 | .286 | 0 | 5 |
| Harry Riconda | 4 | 12 | 2 | .167 | 0 | 0 |
| Sid Womack | 1 | 3 | 0 | .000 | 0 | 1 |

=== Pitching ===
==== Starting pitchers ====
Note: G = Games pitched; IP = Innings pitched; W = Wins; L = Losses; ERA = Earned run average; SO = Strikeouts

| Player | G | IP | W | L | ERA | SO |
|---|---|---|---|---|---|---|
| Larry Benton | 43 | 231.2 | 14 | 14 | 3.85 | 103 |
| Joe Genewich | 37 | 216.0 | 8 | 16 | 3.88 | 59 |
| Bob Smith | 33 | 201.1 | 10 | 13 | 3.75 | 44 |
| Johnny Werts | 32 | 189.1 | 11 | 9 | 3.28 | 65 |
| Hal Goldsmith | 19 | 101.0 | 5 | 7 | 4.37 | 16 |
| Foster Edwards | 3 | 25.0 | 2 | 0 | 0.72 | 4 |

==== Other pitchers ====
Note: G = Games pitched; IP = Innings pitched; W = Wins; L = Losses; ERA = Earned run average; SO = Strikeouts

| Player | G | IP | W | L | ERA | SO |
|---|---|---|---|---|---|---|
| George Mogridge | 39 | 142.0 | 6 | 10 | 4.50 | 46 |
| Bunny Hearn | 34 | 117.1 | 4 | 9 | 4.22 | 40 |
| Johnny Cooney | 19 | 83.1 | 3 | 3 | 4.00 | 23 |
| Kyle Graham | 15 | 36.1 | 3 | 3 | 7.93 | 7 |
| Rosy Ryan | 7 | 19.0 | 0 | 2 | 7.58 | 1 |

==== Relief pitchers ====
Note: G = Games pitched; W = Wins; L = Losses; SV = Saves; ERA = Earned run average; SO = Strikeouts

| Player | G | W | L | SV | ERA | SO |
|---|---|---|---|---|---|---|
| Bill Vargus | 4 | 0 | 0 | 0 | 3.00 | 0 |

== Farm system ==
| Level | Team | League | Manager |
|---|---|---|---|
| A | Providence Rubes | Eastern League | Rube Marquard |

LEAGUE CHAMPIONS: Providence
