= List of Boston and Milwaukee Braves Opening Day starting pitchers =

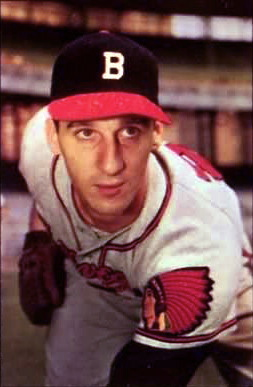
Warren Spahn made ten Opening Day starts for the Braves.

The Braves are a Major League Baseball team that was originally based in Boston. They moved to Milwaukee in 1953 before moving to their current home, Atlanta in 1966. They played in the National League since its formation in 1876. At various points in the history in Boston, they were known as the Beaneaters, the Doves, the Rustlers and the Bees. During the 20th century until their move to Milwaukee, they played their home games primarily at two home ball parks – South End Grounds until 1914, and Braves Field from 1915 through 1952. They also played some home games at Fenway Park in 1914 and 1915, including Opening Day of 1915. Their home ball park in Milwaukee was County Stadium. The first game of the new baseball season for a team is played on Opening Day, and being named the Opening Day starter is an honor, which is often given to the player who is expected to lead the pitching staff that season, though there are various strategic reasons why a team's best pitcher might not start on Opening Day.

The Braves used 40 different Opening Day starting pitchers in their 80 National League seasons they played prior to moving to Atlanta. The Braves won 46 of those games against 42 losses in those Opening Day starts. They also played two tie games.

Warren Spahn had the most Opening Day starts for the Boston and Milwaukee Braves with ten between 1952 and 1964. Kid Nichols made six Opening Day starts between 1893 and 1901. Jim Whitney (1881–1885) and John Clarkson (1888–1892) each had five Opening Day starts. Tommy Bond (1877–1880), Vic Willis (1900–1904), Dick Rudolph (1915–1917, 1919), Al Javery (1942–1945) and Johnny Sain (1946–1949) each made four Opening Day starts. Irv Young (1906–1908), Bob Smith (1927–1929) and Ed Brandt (1932, 1934, 1935) each had three such starts. Other pitchers with multiple Opening Day starts for the Boston and Milwaukee Braves were Charles Radbourn, Jack Stivetts, Hub Perdue, Joe Oeschger, Joe Genewich, Danny MacFayden and Lew Burdette.

Prior to moving to Atlanta, the Braves played in the World Series four times. The played in the World Series as the Boston Braves in 1914 and 1948, and as the Milwaukee Braves in 1957 and 1958. They won the World Series in 1914 and 1957. Their Opening Day starting pitchers in World Series years were Lefty Tyler in 1914, Sain in 1948, and Spahn in 1957 and 1958. They lost their Opening Day game in 1914, 1948 and 1958, and won in 1957. In addition, the franchise won the National League championship eight times during the 19th century, prior to the existence of the modern World Series. Nichols was the team's Opening Day starting pitcher in three of those season, Clarkson and Bond in two of those seasons each, and Whitney was the Opening Day starting pitcher in one such season.

Jesse Barnes made an Opening Day start for the Braves against the New York Giants in 1925, after having made an Opening Day start for the Giants against the Braves in 1920. Spahn is the only pitcher to make an Opening Day start for both the Boston Braves and the Milwaukee Braves. Tony Cloninger, who made the last Opening Day start for the Milwaukee Braves in 1965 and the first for the Atlanta Braves in 1966, is the only pitcher to make an Opening Day start for both the Milwaukee and Atlanta Braves.

== Key ==
Year	Each year is linked to an article about that particular Braves season.
W	Win
L	Loss
T	Tie Game; no decision to starting pitcher
ND (W)	No Decision by starting pitcher; Braves won game
ND (L)	No Decision by starting pitcher; Braves lost game
(W)	Braves won game; no information on starting pitcher's decision
(L)	Braves lost game; no information on starting pitcher's decision
Location	Stadium in italics for home game
(#)	Number of appearances as Opening Day starter
†	NL Champions
‡	World Series Champions

== Pitchers ==
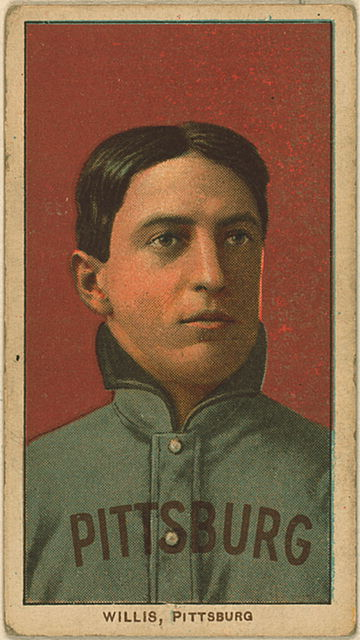
Vic Willis made three consecutive Opening Day starts from 1902 through 1904.

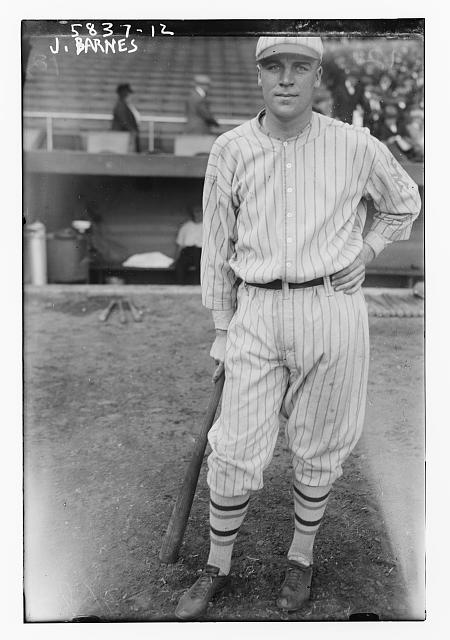
Jesse Barnes made an Opening Day start for the Braves against the New York Giants in 1925, after having made an Opening Day start for the Giants against the Braves in 1920.

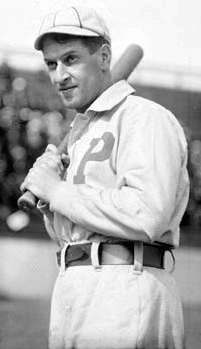
Kid Nichols was the Opening Day starting pitcher six times.

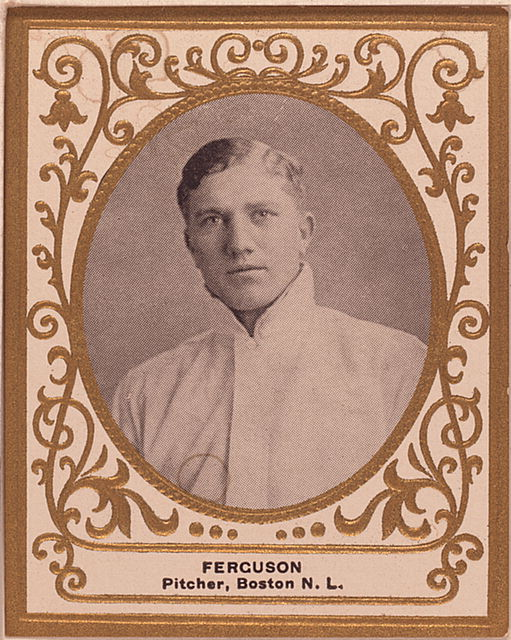
George Ferguson was the Opening Day starting pitcher in 1909.

Year	Pitcher	Decision	Opponent	Location	Reference
1876	Joe Borden	(W)	Philadelphia Athletics	Jefferson Street Grounds	
1877^{†}	Tommy Bond	T	Brooklyn Hartfords	Union Grounds	
1878^{†}	Tommy Bond (2)	W	Providence Grays	Messer Street Grounds	
1879	Tommy Bond (3)	(W)	Buffalo Bisons	Riverside Park	
1880	Tommy Bond (4)	(L)	Providence Grays	Messer Street Grounds	
1881	Jim Whitney	(W)	Providence Grays	Messer Street Grounds	
1882	Jim Whitney (2)	(W)	Worcester Ruby Legs	South End Grounds	
1883^{†}	Jim Whitney (3)	(L)	New York Giants	Polo Grounds	
1884	Jim Whitney (4)	(W)	Buffalo Bisons	South End Grounds	
1885	Jim Whitney (5)	(L)	New York Giants	Polo Grounds	
1886	Charles Radbourn	(L)	New York Giants	Polo Grounds	
1887	Charles Radbourn (2)	(W)	Washington Nationals	Swampoodle Grounds	
1888	John Clarkson	(W)	Philadelphia Phillies	Huntingdon Grounds	
1889	John Clarkson (2)	(W)	New York Giants	Oakland Park, New Jersey	
1890	John Clarkson (3)	W	Brooklyn Bridegrooms	South End Grounds	
1891^{†}	John Clarkson (4)	(W)	New York Giants	Polo Grounds	
1892^{†}	John Clarkson (5)	(W)	Washington Nationals	Boundary Field	
1893^{†}	Kid Nichols	(W)	New York Giants	Polo Grounds	
1894	Jack Stivetts	(W)	Brooklyn Bridegrooms	South End Grounds	
1895	Jack Stivetts (2)	(W)	Washington Nationals	South End Grounds	
1896	Kid Nichols (2)	(W)	Philadelphia Phillies	Baker Bowl	
1897^{†}	Kid Nichols (3)	(L)	Philadelphia Phillies	South End Grounds	
1898^{†}	Kid Nichols (4)	(W)	New York Giants	Polo Grounds	
1899	Kid Nichols (5)	(W)	Brooklyn Superbas	Washington Park	
1900	Vic Willis	(L)	Philadelphia Phillies	South End Grounds	
1901	Kid Nichols (6)	(W)	New York Giants	South End Grounds	
1902	Vic Willis (2)	(L)	Brooklyn Dodgers	Washington Park	
1903	Vic Willis (3)	(W)	Philadelphia Phillies	Baker Bowl	
1904	Vic Willis (4)	(L)	Philadelphia Phillies	Baker Bowl	
1905	Kaiser Wilhelm	(L)	New York Giants	Polo Grounds	
1906	Irv Young	(W)	Brooklyn Dodgers	Washington Park	
1907	Irv Young (2)	(W)	Brooklyn Dodgers	South End Grounds	
1908	Irv Young (3)	(W)	Brooklyn Dodgers	Washington Park	
1909	George Ferguson	(W)	Philadelphia Phillies	South End Grounds	
1910	Al Mattern	(W)	New York Giants	South End Grounds	
1911	Buster Brown	W	Brooklyn Dodgers	South End Grounds	
1912	Hub Perdue	(W)	Philadelphia Phillies	South End Grounds	
1913	Hub Perdue (2)	(W)	New York Giants	Polo Grounds	
1914^{‡}	Lefty Tyler	(L)	Brooklyn Dodgers	Ebbets Field	
1915	Dick Rudolph	(L)	Philadelphia Phillies	Fenway Park	
1916	Dick Rudolph (2)	(W)	Brooklyn Dodgers	Ebbets Field	
1917	Dick Rudolph (3)	(L)	New York Giants	Braves Field	
1918	Pat Ragan	L	Philadelphia Phillies	Baker Bowl	
1919	Dick Rudolph (4)	L	Brooklyn Dodgers	Braves Field	
1920	Eddie Eayrs	W	New York Giants	Polo Grounds	
1921	Joe Oeschger	L	Brooklyn Dodgers	Braves Field	
1922	Joe Oeschger (2)	L	Philadelphia Phillies	Baker Bowl	
1923	Tim McNamara	L	New York Giants	Braves Field	
1924	Joe Genewich	T	Philadelphia Phillies	Baker Bowl	
1925	Jesse Barnes	W	New York Giants	Braves Field	
1926	Joe Genewich (2)	L	Philadelphia Phillies	Baker Bowl	
1927	Bob Smith	L	Brooklyn Dodgers	Braves Field	
1928	Bob Smith (2)	L	New York Giants	Polo Grounds	
1929	Bob Smith (3)	W	Brooklyn Dodgers	Braves Field	
1930	Socks Seibold	L	New York Giants	Polo Grounds	
1931	Tom Zachary	ND (W)	Brooklyn Dodgers	Braves Field	
1932	Ed Brandt	W	Brooklyn Dodgers	Ebbets Field	
1933	Huck Betts	L	Philadelphia Phillies	Braves Field	
1934	Ed Brandt (2)	L	Brooklyn Dodgers	Ebbets Field	
1935	Ed Brandt (3)	W	New York Giants	Braves Field	
1936	Danny MacFayden	L	Philadelphia Phillies	Baker Bowl	
1937	Guy Bush	L	Philadelphia Phillies	Braves Field	
1938	Danny MacFayden (2)	L	New York Giants	Polo Grounds	
1939	Jim Turner	ND (W)	Philadelphia Phillies	Braves Field	
1940	Bill Posedel	L	Brooklyn Dodgers	Ebbets Field	
1941	Dick Errickson	L	Philadelphia Phillies	Shibe Park	
1942	Al Javery	W	Philadelphia Phillies	Shibe Park	
1943	Al Javery (2)	L	New York Giants	Braves Field	
1944	Al Javery (3)	L	New York Giants	Polo Grounds	
1945	Al Javery (4)	L	New York Giants	Braves Field	
1946	Johnny Sain	W	Brooklyn Dodgers	Braves Field	
1947	Johnny Sain (2)	L	Brooklyn Dodgers	Ebbets Field	
1948^{†}	Johnny Sain (3)	L	Philadelphia Phillies	Shibe Park	
1949	Johnny Sain (4)	L	Philadelphia Phillies	Braves Field	
1950	Warren Spahn	W	New York Giants	Polo Grounds	
1951	Vern Bickford	L	New York Giants	Braves Field	
1952	Warren Spahn (2)	L	Brooklyn Dodgers	Braves Field	
1953	Max Surkont	W	Cincinnati Reds	Crosley Field	
1954	Bob Buhl	ND (L)	Cincinnati Reds	Crosley Field	
1955	Warren Spahn (3)	W	Cincinnati Reds	County Stadium	
1956	Lew Burdette	W	Chicago Cubs	County Stadium	
1957^{‡}	Warren Spahn (4)	W	Chicago Cubs	Wrigley Field	
1958^{†}	Warren Spahn (5)	ND (L)	Pittsburgh Pirates	County Stadium	
1959	Warren Spahn (6)	W	Pittsburgh Pirates	Forbes Field	
1960	Warren Spahn (7)	ND (W)	Pittsburgh Pirates	County Stadium	
1961	Warren Spahn (8)	L	St. Louis Cardinals	County Stadium	
1962	Warren Spahn (9)	L	San Francisco Giants	Candlestick Park	
1963	Lew Burdette (2)	ND (L)	Pittsburgh Pirates	Forbes Field	
1964	Warren Spahn (10)	L	San Francisco Giants	Candlestick Park	
1965	Tony Cloninger	W	Cincinnati Reds	Crosley Field	
