= 1926 Cincinnati Reds season =

1926 Cincinnati Reds
- League: National League
- Ballpark: Redland Field
- City: Cincinnati, Ohio
- Owners: Garry Herrmann
- Managers: Jack Hendricks

The 1926 Cincinnati Reds season was a season in American baseball. The team finished second in the National League with 87 wins and 67 losses, 2 games behind the St. Louis Cardinals.

== Off-season ==
On January 15, 1926, the Reds purchased first baseman Wally Pipp from the New York Yankees for $7,500. Pipp, who would turn 32 before the season, played in only 62 games with the Yankees in 1925, batting .230 with three home runs and 24 RBI before being replaced by rising young star, Lou Gehrig. Pipp played with the Yankees from 1915 to 1925, leading the American League in home runs in 1916 and 1917. Pipp appeared in three World Series with the Yankees from 1921 to 1923, helping the team win the 1923 championship. In his last full season with New York in 1924, Pipp hit .295 with nine home runs and had a career high 110 RBI.

In February, the Reds made another purchase, as they acquired catcher Val Picinich from the Boston Red Sox. Picinich batted .255 with one home run and 25 RBI in 90 games for Boston during 1925. Picinich also played for the Philadelphia Athletics and Washington Senators during his career.

== Regular season ==
Cincinnati got off to a hot start, winning 24 of their first 34 games, and on May 22, the club was in first place with a 3.5 game lead over the Chicago Cubs. The Reds slumped to a 5–11 record over their next 16 games, as the Pittsburgh Pirates caught Cincinnati and the two clubs were tied for first place. The Reds again got hot, winning 18 of their next 28 games to improve their record to 47-31 and held a 5.5 game lead over the second place Pirates.

A 7-12 slide by the Reds in their next 19 games dropped them to a 54–43 record and out of first place, as Cincinnati now trailed the Pirates by a game. In late-August, the Reds won 10 games in a row, and found themselves tied with Pittsburgh for first in the National League, with the surging St. Louis Cardinals in third place, only one game behind Cincinnati and Pittsburgh.

The Reds stayed in the pennant race throughout September. The turning point of the season was a brutal five-city, 20 game road trip that saw the Reds start poorly, losing three straight to Pittsburgh. The Reds then rattled off eight-straight wins to briefly move back into first place before losing six-straight including four straight against seventh-place Boston, to kill the Reds' pennant hopes. A home makeup game with St. Louis, which the Reds had hoped would be important, was meaningless as the Reds were 3 games out with that game to go. They won their finale to finish 87-67 and in second place, two games behind the Cardinals, who went on to win the 1926 World Series over the New York Yankees. The Reds set a club record for attendance, 672,987, topping the record set in 1920.

Catcher Bubbles Hargrave had a career season, as he hit .353 batting average, and adding six home runs and 62 RBI in 105 games. Hargrave finished fourth in National League MVP voting. First baseman Wally Pipp had an excellent first season with Cincinnati, hitting .291 with six home runs and 99 RBI in 155 games. Outfielder Edd Roush had another solid season, batting .323 with seven home runs and 79 RBI in 144 games. Rookie outfielder Cuckoo Christensen hit .350 with 41 RBI in 114 games, while outfielder Rube Bressler led Cincinnati with a .357 batting average, and hit one home run and 51 RBI in 86 games.

On the mound, Pete Donohue led the Reds in wins, as he earned a record of 20–14 with a 3.37 ERA while pitching a team high 285.2 innings in 47 games. Carl Mays had a great comeback season, as he had a record of 19–12 with a 3.14 ERA in 39 games and led the National League with 24 complete games.

=== Season standings ===
National League
Team	W	L	Pct.	GB	Home	Road
St. Louis Cardinals	89	65	.578	—	47‍–‍30	42‍–‍35
Cincinnati Reds	87	67	.565	2	53‍–‍23	34‍–‍44
Pittsburgh Pirates	84	69	.549	4½	49‍–‍28	35‍–‍41
Chicago Cubs	82	72	.532	7	49‍–‍28	33‍–‍44
New York Giants	74	77	.490	13½	43‍–‍33	31‍–‍44
Brooklyn Robins	71	82	.464	17½	38‍–‍38	33‍–‍44
Boston Braves	66	86	.434	22	43‍–‍34	23‍–‍52
Philadelphia Phillies	58	93	.384	29½	33‍–‍42	25‍–‍51

=== Record vs. opponents ===
1926 National League record Sources:
Team	BSN	BRO	CHC	CIN	NYG	PHI	PIT	STL
Boston	—	6–15	12–10	12–10–1	12–10	7–15	10–11	7–15
Brooklyn	15–6	—	14–8	4–18	9–13	13–9	9–13–2	7–15
Chicago	10–12	8–14	—	13–9–1	14–8	16–6	10–12	11–11
Cincinnati	10–12–1	18–4	9–13–1	—	7–15	16–6–1	13–9	14–8
New York	10–12	13–9	8–14	15–7	—	12–7	6–16	10–12
Philadelphia	15–7	9–13	6–16	6–16–1	7–12	—	8–14	7–15
Pittsburgh	11–10	13–9–2	12–10	9–13	16–6	14–8	—	9–13–2
St. Louis	15–7	15–7	11–11	8–14	12–10	15–7	13–9–2	—

=== Roster ===
1926 Cincinnati Reds
Roster
Pitchers: Pea Ridge Day; Pete Donohue; Mul Holland; Red Lucas; Dolf Luque; Jakie May; Carl Mays; Rufus Meadows; Roy Meeker; Art Nehf; Eppa Rixey; Brad Springer	Catchers: Bubbles Hargrave; Val Picinich; Ivey Wingo; Infielders: Sam Bohne; Howie Carter; Hughie Critz; Chuck Dressen; Frank Emmer; Hod Ford; Jimmy Hudgens; Babe Pinelli; Wally Pipp; Doc Prothro; Everett Scott	Outfielders: Ethan Allen; Rube Bressler; Cuckoo Christensen; Edd Roush; Curt Walker; Billy Zitzmann; Other batters: Clyde Sukeforth	Manager: Jack Hendricks; Coaches: Grover Land; Bobby Wallace

== Player stats ==
=== Batting ===
==== Starters by position ====
Note: Pos = Position; G = Games played; AB = At bats; H = Hits; Avg. = Batting average; HR = Home runs; RBI = Runs batted in

Pos	Player	G	AB	H	Avg.	HR	RBI
C	Bubbles Hargrave	105	326	115	.353	6	62
1B	Wally Pipp	155	574	167	.291	6	99
2B	Hughie Critz	155	607	164	.270	3	79
SS	Frank Emmer	80	224	44	.196	0	18
3B	Chuck Dressen	127	474	126	.266	4	48
OF	Curt Walker	155	571	175	.306	6	78
OF	Edd Roush	144	563	182	.323	7	79
OF	Cuckoo Christensen	114	329	115	.350	0	41

==== Other batters ====
Note: G = Games played; AB = At bats; H = Hits; Avg. = Batting average; HR = Home runs; RBI = Runs batted in

Player	G	AB	H	Avg.	HR	RBI
Rube Bressler	86	297	106	.357	1	51
Val Picinich	89	240	63	.263	2	31
Babe Pinelli	71	207	46	.222	0	24
Billy Zitzmann	53	94	23	.245	0	3
Sam Bohne	25	54	11	.204	0	5
Jimmy Hudgens	17	20	5	.250	0	1
Ethan Allen	18	13	4	.308	0	0
Ivey Wingo	7	10	2	.200	0	1
Everett Scott	4	6	4	.667	0	1
Doc Prothro	3	5	1	.200	0	1
Howie Carter	5	1	0	.000	0	0
Clyde Sukeforth	1	1	0	.000	0	0

=== Pitching ===
==== Starting pitchers ====
Note: G = Games pitched; IP = Innings pitched; W = Wins; L = Losses; ERA = Earned run average; SO = Strikeouts

Player	G	IP	W	L	ERA	SO
Pete Donohue	47	285.2	20	14	3.37	73
Carl Mays	39	281.0	19	12	3.14	58
Dolf Luque	34	233.2	13	16	3.43	83
Eppa Rixey	37	233.0	14	8	3.40	61

==== Other pitchers ====
Note: G = Games pitched; IP = Innings pitched; W = Wins; L = Losses; ERA = Earned run average; SO = Strikeouts

Player	G	IP	W	L	ERA	SO
Jakie May	45	167.2	13	9	3.22	103
Red Lucas	39	154.0	8	5	3.68	34
Roy Meeker	7	21.0	0	2	6.43	5
Art Nehf	7	17.0	0	1	3.71	4

==== Relief pitchers ====
Note: G = Games pitched; W = Wins; L = Losses; SV = Saves; ERA = Earned run average; SO = Strikeouts

Player	G	W	L	SV	ERA	SO
Pea Ridge Day	4	0	0	0	7.36	2
Mul Holland	3	0	0	0	1.35	0
Brad Springer	1	0	0	0	6.75	1
Rufus Meadows	1	0	0	0	0.00	0
