= List of Major League Baseball leaders in home runs by pitchers =

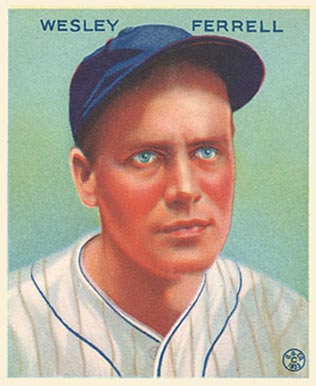
Wes Ferrell holds both the career and season records for home runs by a pitcher.

In baseball, a home run (HR) is typically a fair hit that passes over an outfield fence or into the stands at a distance from home plate of 250 feet or more, which entitles the batter to legally touch all bases and score without liability. Atypically, a batter who hits a fair ball and touches each base in succession from 1st to home, without an error being charged to a defensive player, is credited with an inside-the-park home run. If, during a play, defensive or fan interference is called, and the awarded bases allow the batter to cross home plate, the batter is credited with a home run.

Wes Ferrell holds the all-time Major League Baseball record for home runs hit while playing the position of pitcher. He hit 37 as a pitcher. Baseball Hall of Famers Bob Lemon and Warren Spahn are tied for second with 35 career home runs apiece. Red Ruffing, Earl Wilson, and Don Drysdale are the only other pitchers to hit at least 25 home runs. Jack Stivetts hit a total of 35 home runs in his playing career, 21 as a pitcher. Ferrell and Ruffing also rank among the top pitchers in batting average, hitting .280 and .269, respectively.

As of the 2025 season, Shohei Ohtani holds the lead among all active pitchers with 11 (he has 280 total HRs, but 266 were hit as a designated hitter and 2 were as a pinch hitter). Carlos Zambrano has hit the most home runs by a pitcher since the American League adopted the designated hitter rule in 1973. Starting with the 2022 season, the National League also adopted the designated hitter rule, so most pitchers will no longer bat, except two-way players, such as Ohtani.

Ferrell, who had a career slash line of .280/.351/.446, had his best offensive year in 1931, when he set the single-season record for home runs by a pitcher with nine. The record had previously been held by Stivetts, who had hit seven in 1890. Since 1931, six different pitchers have hit seven home runs in a season: Ferrell, Lemon, Don Newcombe, Don Drysdale (twice), Wilson, and Mike Hampton.

Babe Ruth started his major league career as a pitcher before moving to the outfield. Only 14 of his 714 career home runs were hit as a pitcher, however.

The first pitcher to officially hit a home run was Jack Manning, who accomplished the feat on August 3, 1876. The most home runs by a pitcher in a single game is three, achieved by Jim Tobin on May 13, 1942 and Shohei Ohtani in a postseason game on October 17, 2025. However, Ohtani only hit 2 of those HRs as pitcher of record. His 3rd HR came in the 7th inning after he had been removed as pitcher, but remained in the game as the DH.

== Career ==
=== All-time ===
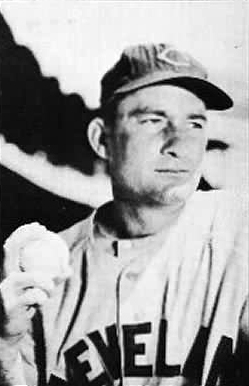
Bob Lemon hit 35 of his 37 career home runs as a pitcher.

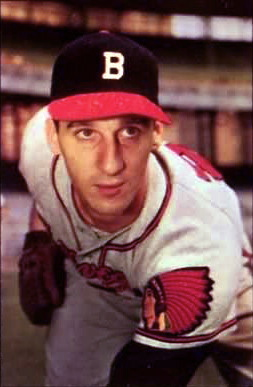
Warren Spahn hit all 35 of his career home runs as a pitcher.

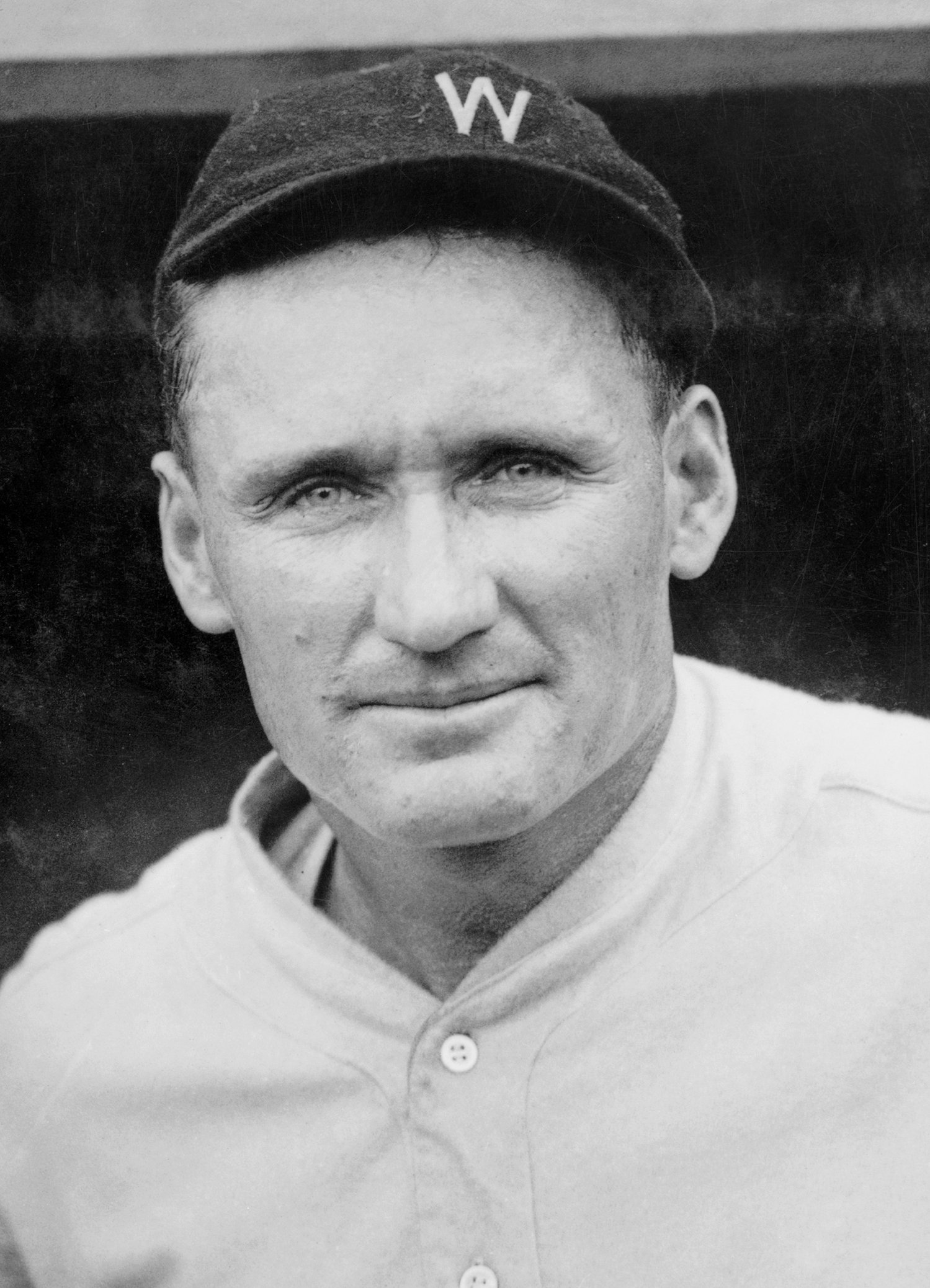
Walter Johnson hit 23 of his 24 career home runs as a pitcher.

Key to symbols in player table
†	Denotes elected to National Baseball Hall of Fame.
**Bold**	Denotes active player. (Note: A player is considered inactive if he has announced his retirement or not played for a full season.)

Most home runs by a pitcher in a career, and their career total including home runs at other positions
Player	Home runs	Career total	Notes	Ref
Wes Ferrell	37	38	Hit one home run as a pinch hitter.	
Bob Lemon^{†}	35	37	Hit two home runs as a pinch hitter.	
Warren Spahn^{†}	35	35		
Red Ruffing^{†}	34	36	Hit two home runs as a pinch hitter.	
Earl Wilson	33	35	Hit two home runs as a pinch hitter.	
Don Drysdale^{†}	29	29		
John Clarkson^{†}	24	24		
Bob Gibson^{†}	24	24		
Carlos Zambrano	24	24		
Walter Johnson^{†}	23	24	Hit one home run as a pinch hitter.	
Jack Stivetts	21	35	Hit 11 home runs while playing various other positions and three as a pinch hitter.	
Milt Pappas	20	20		
Dizzy Trout	20	20		
Jack Harshman	19	21	Hit two home runs as a first baseman.	
Madison Bumgarner	19	19		
Cy Young^{†}	18	18		
Schoolboy Rowe	16	18	Hit two home runs as a pinch hitter.	
Jim Tobin	16	17	Hit one home run as a pinch hitter.	
Jim Kaat^{†}	16	16		
Mike Hampton	16	16		
Jouett Meekin	15	15		
Hal Schumacher	15	15		
Lefty Grove^{†}	15	15		
Claude Passeau	15	15		
Joe Nuxhall	15	15		
Early Wynn^{†}	15	17	Hit two home runs as a pinch hitter.	
Don Newcombe	15	15		
Dick Donovan	15	15		
Don Cardwell	15	15		
Pedro Ramos	15	15		
Rick Wise	15	15		
Gary Peters	15	19	Hit four home runs as a pinch hitter	

- Statistics obtained from MLB.com. Updated through April 24, 2025.

== Single-season ==
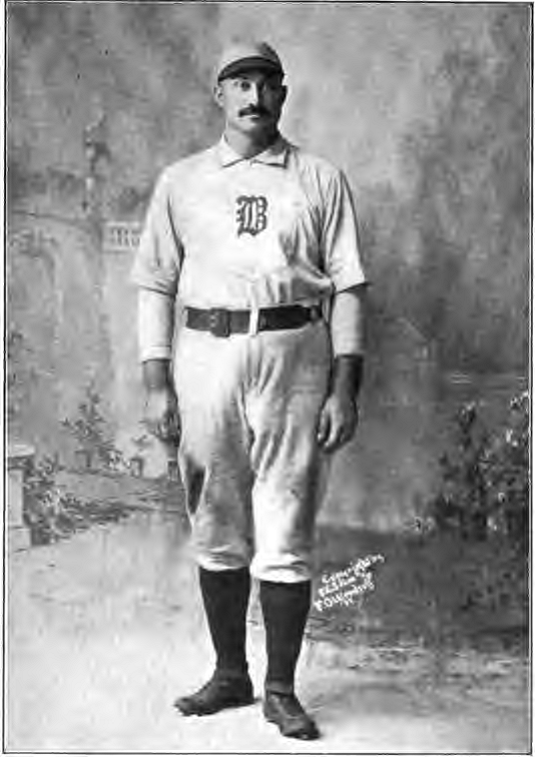
Jack Stivetts hit 7 home runs, as a pitcher, in 1890.

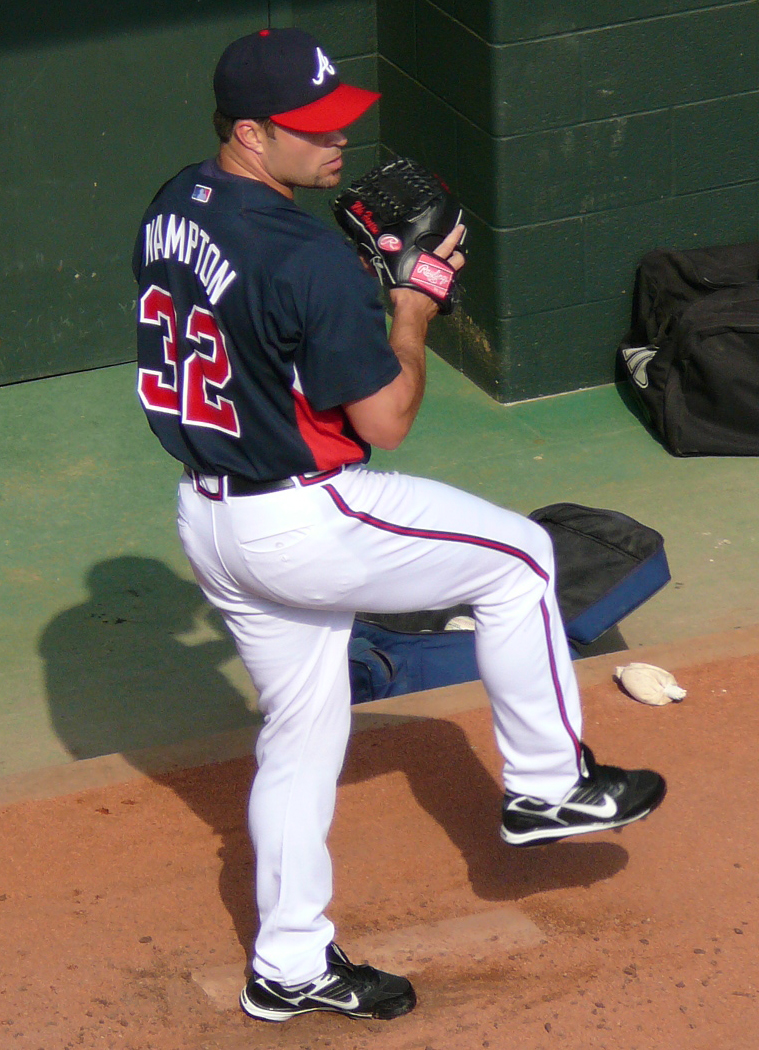
Mike Hampton hit 7 home runs in 2001 for the Colorado Rockies.

Key to symbols in player table
†	Denotes elected to National Baseball Hall of Fame.
**Bold**	Denotes active player.

Most home runs by a pitcher in a season, their total home runs, year, and team
Player	Home runs	Season total	Year	Team	Ref
Wes Ferrell	9	9	1931	Cleveland Indians	
Jack Stivetts	7	7	1890	St. Louis Browns	
Wes Ferrell	7	7	1933	Cleveland Indians	
Bob Lemon^{†}	7	7	1949	Cleveland Indians	
Don Newcombe	7	7	1955	Brooklyn Dodgers	
Don Drysdale^{†}	7	7	1958	Los Angeles Dodgers	
Don Drysdale^{†}	7	7	1965	Los Angeles Dodgers	
Earl Wilson	7	7	1968	Detroit Tigers	
Mike Hampton	7	7	2001	Colorado Rockies	
John Clarkson^{†}	6	6	1887	Chicago White Stockings	
Bill Hutchison	6	6	1894	Chicago Colts	
Hal Schumacher	6	6	1934	New York Giants	
Wes Ferrell	6	7	1935	Boston Red Sox	
Jack Harshman	6	6	1956	Chicago White Sox	
Jack Harshman	6	6	1958	Baltimore Orioles	
Earl Wilson	6	6	1965	Boston Red Sox	
Earl Wilson	6	7	1966	Boston Red Sox/Detroit Tigers	
Ferguson Jenkins^{†}	6	6	1971	Chicago Cubs	
Sonny Siebert	6	6	1971	Boston Red Sox	
Rick Wise	6	6	1971	Philadelphia Phillies	
Carlos Zambrano	6	6	2006	Chicago Cubs	

=== Progression of the single-season record ===
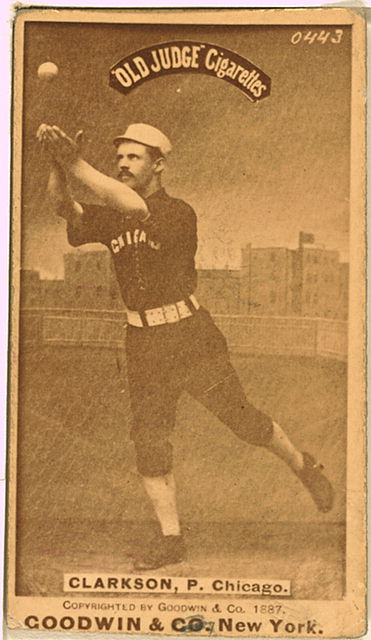
John Clarkson tied the single-season record in 1885 with four, then broke it by hitting six in 1887.

Progression of the single-season home run record by a pitcher, their home run total, year, and team
Player	Home runs	Year	Team	Notes	Ref
Jack Manning	1	1876	Boston Red Caps	Tied by Jim Devlin (1877), Terry Larkin (1877), and John Montgomery Ward (1878).	
John Montgomery Ward^{†}	2	1879	Providence Grays		
Jim Whitney	4	1882	Boston Red Caps	Tied by John Clarkson (1885).	
John Clarkson^{†}	6	1887	Chicago White Stockings		
Jack Stivetts	7	1890	St. Louis Browns		
Wes Ferrell	9	1931	Cleveland Indians		

== Single-game ==
Most home runs by a pitcher in a game, team, home runs, date of game, and opposing team
Player	Team	Home Runs	Date	Opposing team	Ref
Jim Tobin	Boston Braves	3	May 13, 1942	Chicago Cubs	
Shohei Ohtani	Los Angeles Dodgers	3	October 17, 2025	Milwaukee Brewers	

== Bibliography ==
- Official Baseball Rules (PDF). Major League Baseball. 2011. p. 130.
