= Bill Vargus =

American baseball player (1899-1979)

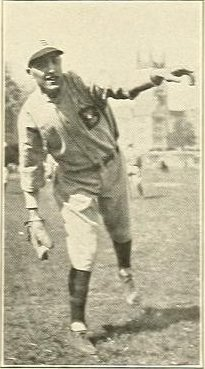
- Pitcher
- Born: November 11, 1899; North Scituate, Massachusetts, U.S.
- Died: February 12, 1979 (aged 79); Hyannis, Massachusetts, U.S.
- Batted: Left Threw: Left

MLB debut
- June 23, 1925, for the Boston Braves

Last MLB appearance
- June 26, 1926, for the Boston Braves

MLB statistics
- Win–loss record: 1–1
- Earned run average: 3.89
- Strikeouts: 5
- Stats at Baseball Reference

Teams
- Boston Braves (1925–1926)

William Fay Vargus (November 11, 1899 – February 12, 1979) was an American Major League Baseball pitcher who played for two seasons. He pitched for the Boston Braves for 11 games during the 1925 Boston Braves season and four games during the 1926 Boston Braves season.
