= Rufus Meadows =

American baseball player (1907–1970)

- Pitcher
- Born: August 25, 1907; Chase City, Virginia, U.S.
- Died: May 10, 1970 (aged 62); Wichita, Kansas, U.S.
- Batted: Left Threw: Left

MLB debut
- April 23, 1926, for the Cincinnati Reds

Last MLB appearance
- April 23, 1926, for the Cincinnati Reds

MLB statistics
- Innings pitched: 0.1
- Earned run average: 0.00
- Stats at Baseball Reference

Teams
- Cincinnati Reds (1926)

Rufus Rivers Meadows (August 25, 1907 – May 10, 1970) was an American left-handed pitcher in Major League Baseball for the Cincinnati Reds in 1926. He appeared in just one game, an 18–1 loss to the Chicago Cubs. Meadows faced the Cubs' final batter of the sixth inning, inducing an out from Cliff Heathcote. Cuckoo Christensen pinch hit for him in the following inning. He is among very few pitchers to face only one batter in his only MLB game.

Meadows was only 18 when he had his brief moment as a major leaguer, and he was the second-youngest player to play in the National League that season, trailing only future Hall of Famer Mel Ott.

Meadows died May 10, 1970, in Wichita, Kansas.
