= Jack Stivetts =

American baseball player (1868–1930)

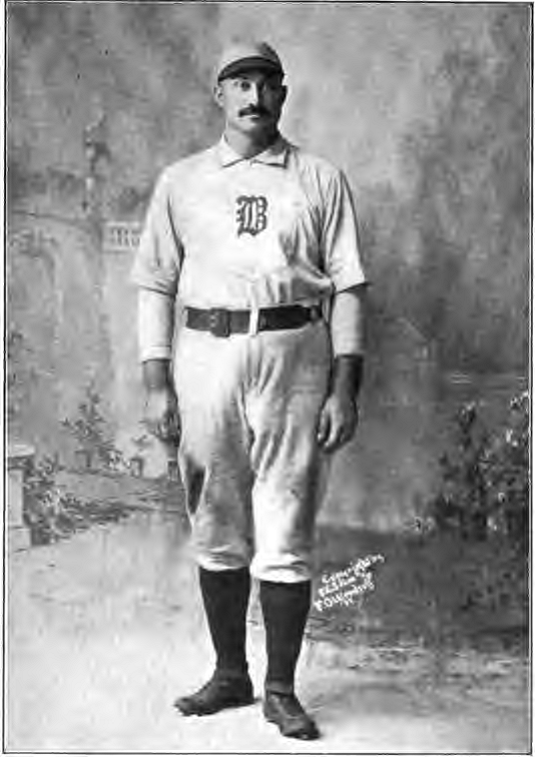
- Pitcher / Outfielder
- Born: March 31, 1868; Ashland, Pennsylvania, U.S.
- Died: April 18, 1930 (aged 62); Ashland, Pennsylvania, U.S.
- Batted: Right Threw: Right

MLB debut
- June 26, 1889, for the St. Louis Browns

Last MLB appearance
- June 12, 1899, for the Cleveland Spiders

MLB statistics
- Win–loss record: 203–132
- Earned run average: 3.74
- Strikeouts: 1,223
- Stats at Baseball Reference

Teams
- St. Louis Browns (1889–1891); Boston Beaneaters (1892–1898); Cleveland Spiders (1899)

Career highlights and awards
- AA ERA champion (1889); AA strikeout champion (1891); Pitched a no-hitter on August 6, 1892

John Elmer Stivetts (March 31, 1868 – April 18, 1930) was an American professional baseball pitcher who played 11 seasons in Major League Baseball (MLB) spanning from 1889 to 1899. He played in the American Association (AA) with the St. Louis Browns, and in the National League (NL) with the Boston Beaneaters and Cleveland Spiders. "Happy Jack" (nicknamed due to his pleasant demeanor) was born to German immigrants and raised in Ashland, Pennsylvania. He initially followed his father into the coal mining industry before playing professional baseball. After playing 2 1/2 seasons in minor league baseball, he was signed by the Browns. Over the next few seasons, he was regarded as one of the best pitchers in baseball.

He led the AA in earned run average (ERA) in his first MLB season, and then in strikeouts two seasons later. In the years spanning from 1890 through 1896, he posted 20 or more victories in a season six times; two in which he won more than 30. In 1892, he won a career-high 35 games, and on August 6, he threw a no-hitter. During his seven seasons with the Beaneaters, he was part of four NL championships, and pitched alongside future Hall of Fame members John Clarkson and Kid Nichols. He was among the best hitting pitchers of his era, and was often used at other positions when he was not pitching. His season total of seven home runs in 1890 stood as the record for pitchers until 1931. He compiled a .298 lifetime batting average, hit 35 home runs, and delivered 357 runs batted in (RBIs).

In his last season in the major leagues, he played for the Spiders, widely considered to be one of the worst teams in MLB history. After his baseball career, he returned to his hometown of Ashland. He worked for the area coal mines as a brewery wagon driver and carpenter, and died there at 62 years of age.

== Early life ==
John Elmer Stivetts was born on March 31, 1868 in Ashland, Pennsylvania. His father, Adam, a coal worker, and mother, Amelia (née Cooper), were both German immigrants. He was raised in a family of Lutherans, receiving his baptism one month after his birth, and his confirmation on April 2, 1882 at the age of 14 from Christ's United Lutheran Church in Ashland. He attended public schools for eight years, before following his father in the coal trade. He married Margaret Ann "Maggie" Thomas in June 1896, and together they had one son, John, and five daughters, Ida, Mary, Leona, Margaret, and Gladys.

In June 1897, at the age of 19, Stivetts began his professional baseball career with the Ashland representative of the Central Pennsylvania League. He compiled a 9–5 win–loss record (W–L) that season with a 1.35 ERA. He returned to the Ashland team in 1888, though he later joined the Allentown Peanuts of the Central League. He began the 1889 season with the York representative of the Middle States League. It was there when an umpire named Tim Hurst noticed Stivetts' talent; who then recommended him to Charles Comiskey, the manager of the St. Louis Browns of the AA. Comiskey was impressed by the velocity of Stivetts' pitches, and offered him a contract. The Philadelphia Athletics soon made an offer of their own, but he accepted the Browns' salary offer of $275 a month, with a $200 signing bonus.

== Career ==
=== St. Louis ===
==== 1889 season ====
When Stivetts joined the Browns, he became their third starting pitcher in the rotation behind Silver King and Ice Box Chamberlain. He made his major league debut on June 26, 1889 against the Cincinnati Reds. He pitched a complete game and struck out nine batters, but lost the game by the score of 6–1 behind several errors made by his teammates. His performance was noted in the press to have "made a good impression."

In his 26 games pitched that season, he had a W–L record of 12–7 and had a league-leading 2.25 ERA while St. Louis finished two games behind the Brooklyn Bridegrooms for the AA championship. He started 20 games, completed 18, struck out 143, and pitched 191 2/3 innings. It was reported on November 13, 1889 that he had re-signed with the Browns for the 1890 season.

==== 1890 season ====
During the off-season, an up-start league was created, the Players' League (PL), which drew many players away from teams from both the AA and NL teams. The Browns lost a few of their best players as well, including Comiskey, their player-manager, and King, the team's top pitcher. Chamberlain re-signed with the team, but he was sold to the Columbus Solons after pitching in just five games. These movements left Stivetts and Toad Ramsey as the franchise's top two starters, with rookie Billy Hart cast as the occasional relief starter.

The Browns opened the regular season on April 18 with a four-game series on the road versus the Louisville Colonels, and Stivetts started games two and four. In game two, he recorded 13 strikeouts, but lost the game 5–3 on a tenth-inning, two run double by Tim Shinnick. In game four on April 21, Stivetts was again credited with the loss by allowing 17 runs to score, seven of which were earned. He fared better in his third start however, allowing just one run as the Browns defeated the Solons by a 14–1 score. He struck out 12 batters, including the first seven he faced, and hit the first home run of his career.

On June 10, against Fred Smith and the Toledo Maumees, he hit two home runs in one game, the first of three times in his career he accomplished the feat. The first was a two-run home run in the fifth inning, and the second came with his team down by three runs in the bottom half of ninth inning and the bases loaded. It was the first, and only, grand slam of his career, and the second "ultimate grand slam" in history. (Note: Although the box score of the game shows the Browns's scoring line first, it was the custom for the home team to bat second. Eventually, this practice became codified as an official rule on December 21, 1949 during the Professional Baseball Official Playing Rules Committee meeting.) In a game versus the Brooklyn Gladiators on July 6, manager Chris von der Ahe removed the Browns' starting pitcher Ramsey in the third inning and replaced him with Stivetts. Though the crowd momentarily interrupted the game in protest, the move proved successful. Stivetts hit a home run in the fifth inning to give the Browns a 3 runs to 1 advantage, leading the team to an eventual 7–2 victory. The home run was his sixth of the season, and he added another on August 9 for number seven: his final season total. His seven home runs in a season by a pitcher was neither broken nor tied until 1931, when Wes Ferrell hit nine for the Cleveland Indians. St. Louis finished in third-place among the nine AA teams, 12 games behind the Colonels. Stivetts had a W–L record of 27–21, a 3.52 ERA, and 289 strikeouts in 419 1/3 innings pitched, along with three shutouts.

==== 1891 season ====
On January 25, 1891, it was reported that he had re-signed with the Browns for the up-coming season. The season opened April 8, and the Browns faced the Cincinnati Kelly's Killers at home. Stivetts was the team's opening day starting pitcher. The game ended in the bottom of ninth inning when the umpire, former player and St. Louis native Bill Gleason, determined that Cincinnati was intentionally allowing St. Louis to score in an effort to delay the game. St. Louis was awarded the forfeit when Cincinnati refused to play. AA president, Louis Kramer, declared the forfeit illegal a short time later, and the game was re-played on April 12. St. Louis won the re-match behind the pitching of Stivetts. This was Gleason's second and last career game as an umpire. Over the course of the season, Stivetts was the Browns' ace, pitching mostly every second or third game the team played. When not pitching, or when he occasionally played in right field, the Browns used Joe Neale, Willie McGill, and future Hall of Fame executive Clark Griffith as part of the starting rotation. On May 30, Stivetts started both games of a doubleheader in a home series versus the Philadelphia Athletics. Due to large leads by the Browns, he was pulled from each game; lasting two innings in the first and six in the second.

Stivetts won each of his next three starts, hitting a home run in the third game, on June 6, against the Boston Reds. He hit two more in a game on August 6, against Gus Weyhing of the Athletics, the second two-homer game of his career. He connected for another off of Weyhing in a game on September 16, during a four-run ninth inning that gave the Browns a 10–7 victory. This was his seventh home run of the season, fourth as a pitcher, adding to three that he hit while playing right field. Again, he was among the best pitchers in the AA, and among the league leaders in many pitching categories. His 259 strikeouts led the league, while his 33 victories were third, and his 2.86 ERA ranked fifth. St. Louis completed the season second in the AA among the nine teams, 8.5 games behind the champion Reds.

=== Boston ===
==== 1892 season ====
Though Stivetts initially denied it, it was reported on September 28, 1891 that he signed with the Boston Beaneaters of the National League (NL) for the 1892 season. Stivetts joined a pitching rotation that already included future Baseball Hall of Fame members John Clarkson and Kid Nichols, as well as veteran Harry Staley. With Boston's solid pitching staff, and their potent mix of position players consisting of future Hall of Fame members and established veterans, the team was expected to compete for a second consecutive NL championship. When analyzing the 12 National League teams, New York Giants captain, Buck Ewing, remarked about Boston's roster, "I think Clarkson has seen his better days. Jack Stivetts will strengthen them wonderfully. He is one of the best pitchers in the country to-day." In Stivetts' first start of the season on April 23, his pitching was described as "wild", as he issued six bases on balls. He prevailed, however, and Boston won by the score of 11–7. Four days later, he was victorious again, and Boston's W–L record stood at 10–1 after their first 11 games. On June 23, he hit his first home run of the season, along with a double, in a 13–6 victory over the Baltimore Orioles. The Pittsburg Dispatch reported on July 1 that Stivetts was leading Boston hitters in batting at that point in the season. (Note: Stivetts' .298 batting average finished second among Boston's hitters behind Hugh Duffy's .302.)

With Stivetts now established, Clarkson became expendable and was released from the team on June 30, leaving Boston with a solid three-man pitching rotation for the remainder of the season. On August 6, 1892, Stivetts pitched a no-hitter against the Brooklyn Bridegrooms, an 11–0 victory. Later, on September 5, he started, completed, and defeated Louisville in both games of a doubleheader. The following day, the press credited the victories to his ability to work well with runners on the bases. The regular season for the Beaneaters closed on October 15 with a doubleheader against the Washington Senators. Stivetts pitched the second game, and delivered a complete game shutout, his third shutout of the season, and his 35th victory. Although he finished within the top-ten in several pitching statistical categories, his strikeout total dropped to 180 in 1892. His 3.9 strikeouts per 9 innings pitched (K/9) was significantly lower from the 5.3 the previous season.

The AA had dissolved following the 1891 season, with several teams merging with the NL, re-establishing itself as the lone "major league". The NL devised a post-season series to determine a champion between the two half-season victors. This series pitted the Beaneaters (the first-half champions) against the Cleveland Spiders (the second-half champions). The first game occurred on October 17; Stivetts started for Boston, and future Hall of Famer Cy Young pitched for Cleveland. The pitching duel lasted eleven scoreless innings before the game was brought to end by darkness. After Boston won game two behind Staley on October 18, Stivetts started and gained the victory in the game on October 19. The Beaneaters were declared the NL champion after winning five straight after the opening tie game; Stivetts gained victories in three. This playoff scheme was abandoned after the season.

==== 1893 season ====
On January 21, 1893, it was reported that Stivetts re-signed with Boston for the up-coming season. In March, Stivetts' name was tied to an "imminent" trade between Boston and Brooklyn that involved pitcher Tom Lovett transferring to Boston. Ultimately, the deal did not transpire, however, and each pitcher reported to their respective teams. Several rule changes were implemented before the 1893 season that intended to even the competitive balance between the pitchers and hitters. One lengthened the distance between the pitching mound and home plate from 50 feet to 60 feet 6 inches, and another required pitchers were to pitch from a rubber slab instead of being allowed to take a running start before they delivered the ball to the batter.

Stivetts struggled with the new distance initially; his first four starts of the season were largely ineffective. On April 29, with the weather cold and rainy, he issued bases on balls to ten New York Giants batters, and surrendered 15 runs. The next two starts were against Baltimore and he allowed seven runs to score the first game despite gaining the victory, and another 16 runs in a loss in the second game. Another ten runs scored on May 10, in a loss versus the Washington Senators.

His troubles adjusting to the new rules, and his athletic conditioning during June and July, prompted the team to sign Hank Gastraight for added pitching strength. He struck out just 61 batters in 283 2/3 for a 1.6 K/9, and his ERA increased from 3.03 in 1892 to 4.41. Despite this, he helped Boston claim their third consecutive NL championship with a 20–12 W–L record.

==== 1894 season ====
With the previous season's inconsistencies behind him, Stivetts was re-signed and was the team's starting pitcher for Boston's season-opening game on April 19; a 13–2 victory versus the Bridegrooms of Brooklyn. He then lost his next eight starts, however, before beginning a ten-game winning streak that lasted into mid-July. On August 21, he started and gained complete game victories in both ends of a doubleheader versus the Cincinnati Reds. Two days later, on August 23, he pitched Boston to a 12–10 victory against the Spiders. That same day in Ashland, his father was killed in a coal mining accident when a load of coal fell on top on him.

Boston finished in third place among the 12 NL teams in 1894, and Stivetts won 26 games, though most of his numbers in important statistical categories failed to improve or became worse. His ERA rose to 4.90, and his K/9 moved up slightly to 2.0 when he struck out 76 in 338 innings pitched. He issued 127 bases on balls, and surrendered a league-leading 27 home runs. His biggest success in 1894 was his skill as a hitter. Beginning on July 5, Boston played a three-game series against Cleveland. While alternating game to game from pitching and playing in right field, Stivetts hit one home run in each game, the last one coming in the sixth inning off of Cy Young, completing the sweep. He hit a career-high season total of eight home runs. He also achieved career-highs with 64 RBIs, seven triples, and 55 runs scored, while batting .328 in 68 games played.

==== 1895 season ====
In early November, due to the threat that a new American Association was near formation, the National League clubs were quick to sign their players without much negotiating. Many of the players' salary demands were met, including Stivetts'. In March, shortly before the 1895 season began, Stivetts claimed he was in "excellent physical condition", and that he was "many pounds lighter than he was at this period last year". The season opener was on April 19 against Brooklyn, and Stivetts got the start over Nichols for the second consecutive season. Despite being down early in the game, Boston won the game 11–6 behind a seven-run seventh inning. Stivetts scored thrice and gathered two hits in the game, including a double.

During the 1893 season, Stivetts involved himself in a dispute between two catholic players, Tommy Tucker and Hugh Duffy, and their manager Frank Selee. The resulting rift occasionally caused strife among team members. Factions formed, with Duffy, Tucker, and Tommy McCarthy on one side; Herman Long, Bobby Lowe, and Stivetts on the other. These disagreements, in part, led to an incident in a Louisville, Kentucky hotel dining room between Stivetts and McCarthy. In response to something Stivetts had said, McCarthy retaliated by punching him once in the face and then calmly left the restaurant.

His W–L record slid to 17–17, while his ERA improved slightly to 4.64 in 291 innings pitched, as Boston fell to fifth place, 16.5 games behind the NL champions from Baltimore. His hitting suffered as well; his batting average dropped to a career-low .190, and he failed to hit a home run for the first time since his rookie season. Shortly after Boston completed its schedule, Stivetts re-signed for the 1896 season.

==== 1896 season ====
During the off-season, trade talks were conducted, but not completed, between the Beaneaters and the Philadelphia Quakers. The deal likely involved Stivetts and Tucker, two players involved in Boston's religious quarrel from the previous season. As the season progressed, the press noted that his season had begun better than the previous season. Stivetts claimed that it was his weight loss (now just over 200 lbs), that was the main reason why he had been more of an asset to the team than in past years.

Though he lost his first start of season, he rebounded to win six starts in succession from April 25 though May 20, including a 7–0 shutout victory on May 8 versus Louisville. On June 12, he pitched Boston to a 15–3 victory over the Reds at home, and connected for two home runs against Chauncey Fisher. This was the third, and last, time he hit two home runs in a single game. He hit three home runs total for the season and improved his batting average to .347 in 222 at bats. He increased his win total to 22, and his 4.10 ERA was the lowest since 1892.

On October 3, it was reported that he was retained by Boston under the reserve clause. When interviewed during the off-season, Stivetts claimed that he would like to quit pitching and play first, that is if a team would give him the opportunity. Selee, Boston's manager, disagreed and claimed that the team needed Stivetts in the pitching rotation instead. It was also likely that he would have received less salary playing at first.

==== 1897 season ====
Boston re-signed Stivetts for $2,100 despite the view of some in the press who believed Boston would continue to sink in the standings if they didn't rid themselves of him and the team's manager. Shortly after Stivetts' first start of the season, a 10–5 loss on April 23 in Baltimore, Selee commented that Stivetts will not be pitching much into the future, saying that "he is growing rather stiff, and will not let himself out as he did when he was at his best, some years ago." His weight was now at 217 lbs, so as the team departed on May 10 for a western road trip, Selee sent him back to Ashland to get back into proper game condition. Although he was told not to report back to the team until his weight was below 200 lbs, he had re-joined the team and played right field in the second game of a doubleheader on May 15. His place in the rotation fell behind Nichols, Fred Klobedanz, and Ted Lewis. He made a relief appearance on May 18, before having to take some time off for a sore arm. His next start occurred on May 31, when Boston defeated St. Louis by a 25–5 score. He earned his second consecutive victory on June 11, a 12–4 win over Louisville.

While he only pitched 129 1/3 innings in 18 games during the season, he fared well, and helped Boston re-claim the NL championship, with an 11–4 W–L record, and 3.41 ERA. As a hitter, he continued to flourish, with a .367 batting average, hit a career-high nine triples, and added two more home runs. At the conclusion of the regular season, Boston faced the second place Orioles in a post-season series, the Temple Cup. Created after the 1893 season by Pittsburgh Pirates owner William Chase Temple, the winner of the best-of-seven game series was awarded possession of a silver ornate cup, and 65% of the proceeds to be distributed to the players. Boston players were fatigued by their championship run, especially their games against second-place Baltimore, and now were facing the Orioles again, in the Temple Cup. Because of the fatigue, and an agreed upon even-split of the proceeds, the series was played without much enthusiasm from either team. Boston won game one, but then lost the next four games, giving Baltimore the cup. Stivetts pitched in game four, losing 12–11 to Jerry Nops. Due to McCarthy's sloppy play in center field throughout the series, he was benched in the final game in favor of Stivetts. After four seasons, the series lacked popular support and was discontinued.

==== 1898 season ====
Stivetts was again reserved by Boston, and later re-signed for $2000. Due to the Beaneaters' solid, four-man starting pitching rotation of Nichols, Klobedanz, Lewis, and rookie Vic Willis, his role with the team was expected to be as an extra outfielder. Stivetts claimed that he had never felt better in his life and his outlook on the up-coming season was positive.

In a game versus the Reds on June 9, the score was tied 5–5 in the bottom of the ninth inning when Stivetts connected for a pinch-hit, walk-off solo home run. This was his second career walk off home run, his third as a pinch hitter, and the last home run of his career. It was reported on July 22 that a deal had been agreed upon to trade Stivetts to the St. Louis Browns of the NL for Kid Carsey and cash. The deal was contingent upon the acceptance of Stivetts. In early August, the Boston manager Selee sent Stivetts home, commenting that the team did not have use of his services any longer. Tim Hurst, now managing St. Louis, planned on using Stivetts in center field. Stivetts refused to accept the move to St. Louis, and a sale was officially conducted on August 14 that sent him to St. Louis for $2000 and an unnamed player. True to his word, Stivetts did not report, or play a single game for St. Louis that season. Due to his objection to being sold to St. Louis, he claimed that he would remain in Ashland and return to coal mining.

=== St. Louis/Cleveland ===
==== 1899 season ====
During the off-season, the owners of the Cleveland Spiders purchased the St. Louis Browns from Chris von der Ahe. They changed the team name to Perfectos, and inherited their players. In early 1899, Stivetts claimed interest in playing for the St. Louis franchise if his salary were equal to what he was paid with Boston. The new owners, to maximize their assets, transferred all the best players to St. Louis, while sending the rest, including Stivetts, to Cleveland. The Spiders released Stivetts on June 13, and he subsequently retired from playing baseball. In 18 games for the Spiders, Stivetts had a .205 batting average and a 0–4 W–L record. He was claimed by St. Paul of the Western League a few days later, but did not play a game for the team. In his 11-season career, Stivetts won 203 games against 132 losses, a 3.74 ERA, and 1223 strikeouts in 2887 2/3 innings pitched. In addition to his 35 career home runs as a hitter, he collected 593 hits in 1992 at bats for a .298 batting average, and had 357 RBIs.

== Post-baseball/Legacy ==
After his retirement from professional baseball, he worked for the coal industry in various capacities. He was listed as a carpenter in both the 1910 and 1920 Federal Census. He operated a brewery wagon for a coal company in his hometown of Ashland. In April 1912, he was working as a carpenter for the Black Ridge mine in Conyngham, Pennsylvania. He occasionally played on small clubs around the Ashland area, and in May 1902, he survived a bout of smallpox. By 1930, he was no longer working. He died on April 18, 1930, at the age of 62 in Ashland, and is interred at Brock Cemetery.

He was described by sportswriters of the time as one of the fastest pitchers in the league, comparable to Amos Rusie and Ted Breitenstein. Kid Nichols remarked in 1902 that Stivetts' speed was as fast as Rusie, and could have extended his career much longer had he taken better care of his body. Baseball writer O. P. Caylor wrote that Stivetts' issues were entirely his own, blaming his hard-drinking lifestyle and his inability to remain in good condition.

== See also ==
- List of Major League Baseball no-hitters
- List of Major League Baseball annual ERA leaders
- List of Major League Baseball annual strikeout leaders
- List of Major League Baseball career wins leaders
- List of Major League Baseball all-time leaders in home runs by pitchers
- List of St. Louis Cardinals team records

== Bibliography ==
- Abrams, Roger (2003). The First World Series and the Baseball Fanatics of 1903. Northeastern University. ISBN 978-1-55553-561-2.
- Eisenbath, Mike (1999). The Cardinals Encyclopedia. Temple University Press. ISBN 978-1-56639-703-2.
- Caruso, Gary (1995). The Braves Encyclopedia. Temple University Press. ISBN 978-1-56639-384-3.
- Fleitz, David L. (2007). More Ghosts in the Gallery: Another Sixteen Little-known Greats at Cooperstown. McFarland & Company. ISBN 978-0-78648-062-3.
- Hubbard, Donald (2008). The Heavenly Twins Of Boston Baseball: A Dual Biography of Hugh Duffy and Tommy McCarthy. McFarland & Company. ISBN 978-0-78643-455-8.
- James, Bill; Rob Neyer (2008). The Neyer/James Guide to Pitchers: An Historical Compendium of Pitching, Pitchers, and Pitches. Simon & Schuster. ISBN 978-1-43910-377-7.
- Porter, David L. (2000). Biographical Dictionary of American Sports: Baseball, Q-Z. Greenwood Publishing Group. ISBN 978-0-31331-176-5.
- Simon, Gary A.; Jeffrey S. Simonoff. "Last licks": Do they really help? (PDF).
- Smiles, Jack (2005). Ee-Yah: The Life And Times Of Hughie Jennings, Baseball Hall Of Famer. McFarland & Company. ISBN 978-0-78648-428-7.
- Vincent, David (2009). Home Run's Most Wanted™: The Top 10 Book of Monumental Dingers, Prodigious Swingers, and Everything Long-Ball. Potomac Books, Inc. ISBN 978-1-59797-192-8.

Achievements
Preceded by Ted Breitenstein	No-hitter pitcher August 6, 1892	Succeeded by Ben Sanders
