= Ed Brandt =

American baseball player (1905–1944)

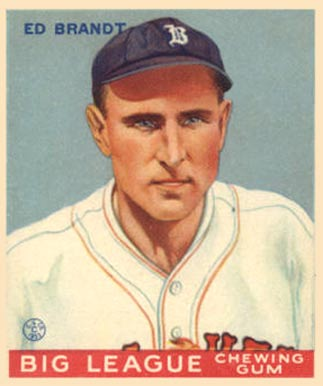
- Pitcher
- Born: February 17, 1905; Spokane, Washington, U.S.
- Died: November 2, 1944 (aged 39); Spokane, Washington, U.S.
- Batted: Left Threw: Left

MLB debut
- April 15, 1928, for the Boston Braves

Last MLB appearance
- September 29, 1938, for the Pittsburgh Pirates

MLB statistics
- Win–loss record: 121–149
- Earned run average: 3.86
- Strikeouts: 877
- Stats at Baseball Reference

Teams
- Boston Braves (1928–1935); Brooklyn Dodgers (1936); Pittsburgh Pirates (1937–1938)

Edward Arthur Brandt (February 17, 1905 – November 2, 1944) was an American pitcher in Major League Baseball from 1928 to 1938. He played for the Boston Braves, Brooklyn Dodgers, and Pittsburgh Pirates.

Brandt started his professional baseball career with the Pacific Coast League's Seattle Indians. While pitching in a semipro game in Baker, Oregon, Brandt unknowingly played against Chick Gandil, a participant in the Black Sox scandal. As a result, Brandt was banned from organized baseball for one year. In 1927, he went 19–11 with a 3.97 earned run average. He joined the Boston Braves in 1928. From 1931 to 1934, he led the team in innings pitched each season and also won over 15 games each season. Following the team's disastrous 1935 season, Brandt was traded to the Dodgers. He was traded to the Pirates for the 1937 season. Brandt was fired from the Pirates in 1939 following multiple training violations. A few days after being released from the Pirates, Brandt signed with the Hollywood Outlaws of the Coastal League. Brandt remained with the team for two months before being released. He retired in 1939.

Brandt was a competent hitting pitcher in his major league career. He posted a .236 batting average (187-for-793) with 80 runs, 59 RBI and 55 bases on balls. He was used as a pinch hitter 12 times in his career. Defensively, he was better than average, recording a .977 fielding percentage which was 17 points higher than the league average at his position.

After his retirement, Brandt operated a hunting lodge and also owned a tavern. He was killed on November 2, 1944, when he was struck by a motorist while crossing a street. He is buried at the Fairmount Memorial Park in Spokane, Washington.

== See also ==
- List of Boston and Milwaukee Braves Opening Day starting pitchers
