= Oak Grove, Alabama =

- Town
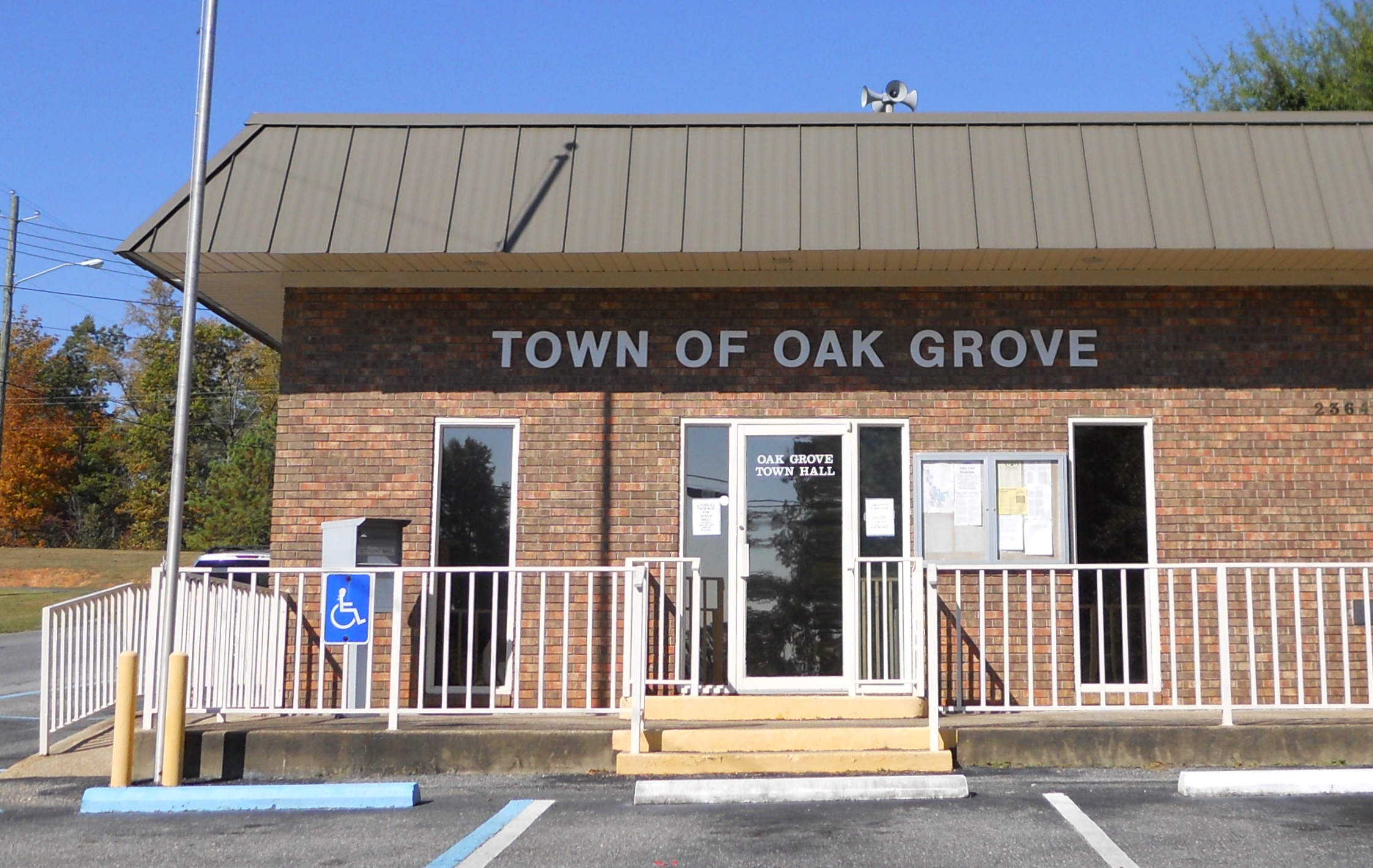
- Oak Grove Town Hall

- Location of Oak Grove in Talladega County, Alabama.
- Coordinates: 33°11′23″N 86°18′11″W
- Country: United States
- State: Alabama
- County: Talladega

Area
  - Total: 1.85 sq mi (4.78 km^{2})
  - Land: 1.85 sq mi (4.78 km^{2})
  - Water: 0.0039 sq mi (0.01 km^{2})
- Elevation: 558 ft (170 m)

Population (2020)
  - Total: 564
  - Density: 305.7/sq mi (118.04/km^{2})
- Time zone: UTC-6 (Central (CST))
  - Summer (DST): UTC-5 (CDT)
- ZIP codes: 35150-35151
- Area code: 256
- FIPS code: 01-55752
- GNIS feature ID: 2407015
- Website: www.townofoakgrove.org

Oak Grove is a town in Talladega County, Alabama, United States. It was incorporated in 1966. At the 2020 census, the population was 564.

== Geography ==
According to the U.S. Census Bureau, the town has a total area of 1.8 square miles (4.6 km^{2}), all land.

Oak Grove is a suburb of the city of Sylacauga. The two municipalities are contiguous, and both run along U.S. Highway 280, which runs from Birmingham, Alabama, southeastward to Columbus, Georgia, and then through Georgia toward Savannah. Oak Grove is 40 miles (64 km) southeast of Birmingham and 70 miles (110 km) north of Montgomery via U.S. Highway 231.

Oak Grove is a hilly town occupying both sides of Landers Hill and Merkle Mountain. There is no town square or downtown. There are numerous businesses along U.S. Highway 280, locally called "the four-lane", and County Road 511, which was formerly U.S. 280 before construction of the four-lane.

In the middle of Oak Grove between its two hills there was a cut-your-own Christmas tree farm which yearly drew hundreds of families to Oak Grove. It was started in 1978 by later Oak Grove Mayor Bloise Zeigler, who operated the farm through 2009. Zeigler grew the official Alabama state Christmas tree, which was displayed at the Alabama Governor's Mansion in 2004. The Christmas tree farm was closed in 2010 and donated by the former Mayor to the Town of Oak Grove as a community garden named "Comet Grove". It provides free produce to low-income people and cheap produce to everyone else. It has ordinary open gardens and two acres of experimental "plasticulture".

== Demographics ==
Historical population
Census	Pop.	Note	%±
1970	482		—
1980	638		32.4%
1990	436		−31.7%
2000	457		4.8%
2010	528		15.5%
2020	564		6.8%
U.S. Decennial Census; 2013 Estimate

As of the census of 2000, there were 457 people, 178 households, and 124 families residing in the town. The population density was 399.4 inhabitants per square mile (154.2/km^{2}). There were 203 housing units at an average density of 177.4 per square mile (68.5/km^{2}). The racial makeup of the town was 96.72% White, 2.84% Black or African American and 0.44% Native American. 0.44% of the population were Hispanic or Latino of any race.

There were 178 households, out of which 32.6% had children under the age of 18 living with them, 56.7% were married couples living together, 10.7% had a female householder with no husband present, and 29.8% were non-families. 25.3% of all households were made up of individuals, and 10.7% had someone living alone who was 65 years of age or older. The average household size was 2.48 and the average family size was 2.96.

In the town, the population was spread out, with 24.5% under the age of 18, 7.4% from 18 to 24, 26.7% from 25 to 44, 26.9% from 45 to 64, and 14.4% who were 65 years of age or older. The median age was 39 years. For every 100 females, there were 87.3 males. For every 100 females age 18 and over, there were 77.8 males.

The median income for a household in the town was $28,625, and the median income for a family was $29,625. Males had a median income of $29,417 versus $19,375 for females. The per capita income for the town was $12,865. About 10.4% of families and 15.7% of the population were below the poverty line, including 21.0% of those under age 18 and 21.8% of those age 65 or over.

== Notable events ==
Oak Grove gained national recognition in 1954 when it became the first reported site in the history of the world of a meteor striking a human. Mrs. Ann E. Hodges was on her sofa in her Oak Grove home when something crashed through her roof, striking her on the hip. It turned out to be a meteorite. The incident gained national news coverage, including an appearance by Mrs. Hodges on Garry Moore's TV show, I've Got a Secret. Celebrity participant Henry Morgan guessed the secret.

Oak Grove has a "Gravity Hill" where cars appear to coast uphill, but is actually an optical illusion. The phenomenon has generated news coverage and curiosity seekers. It is on Old Highway 280, now named "Gravity Hill Road", just off Highway 280 in the western part of Oak Grove toward Childersburg.

One native son of Oak Grove was elected to the Alabama Public Service Commission. Jim Zeigler, born in neighboring Sylacauga in 1948 and raised in Oak Grove, won the PSC seat in 1974, becoming the youngest person to hold a state office. He won the seat two years after graduating from the University of Alabama, where he had been elected President of the Student Government Association, defeating the fraternity political party, "The Machine".

== Notable person ==
- Skinny Graham, former Major League Baseball pitcher
