= Howie Carter =

American baseball player (1904–1991)

- Second baseman/Third baseman
- Born: October 13, 1904; New York, New York, U.S.
- Died: July 24, 1991 (aged 86); New York, New York, U.S.
- Batted: Right Threw: Right

MLB debut
- June 21, 1926, for the Cincinnati Reds

Last MLB appearance
- July 31, 1926, for the Cincinnati Reds

MLB statistics
- Games played: 5
- At bats: 1
- Hits: 0
- Stats at Baseball Reference

Teams
- Cincinnati Reds (1926)

John Howard Carter (October 13, 1904 – July 24, 1991) was an American Major League Baseball second baseman and third baseman who played with the Cincinnati Reds in 1926. He played in five games, but only got one at bat.
