= Sid Womack =

American baseball player

- Catcher
- Born: October 2, 1896; Greensburg, Louisiana, U.S.
- Died: August 28, 1958 (aged 61); Jackson, Mississippi, U.S.
- Batted: Right Threw: Right

MLB debut
- August 15, 1926, for the Boston Braves

Last MLB appearance
- August 15, 1926, for the Boston Braves

MLB statistics
- Batting average: .000
- At bats: 3
- Runs batted in: 1
- Stats at Baseball Reference

Teams
- Boston Braves (1926)

Sidney Kirk Womack (October 2, 1896 – August 28, 1958), nicknamed "Tex", was an American professional baseball player. He appeared in one game in Major League Baseball for the 1926 Boston Braves as a catcher. He was born in Greensburg, Louisiana, and died in Jackson, Mississippi. He went to LSU and Mississippi State University.
