= Irv Young =

American baseball player (1877–1935)

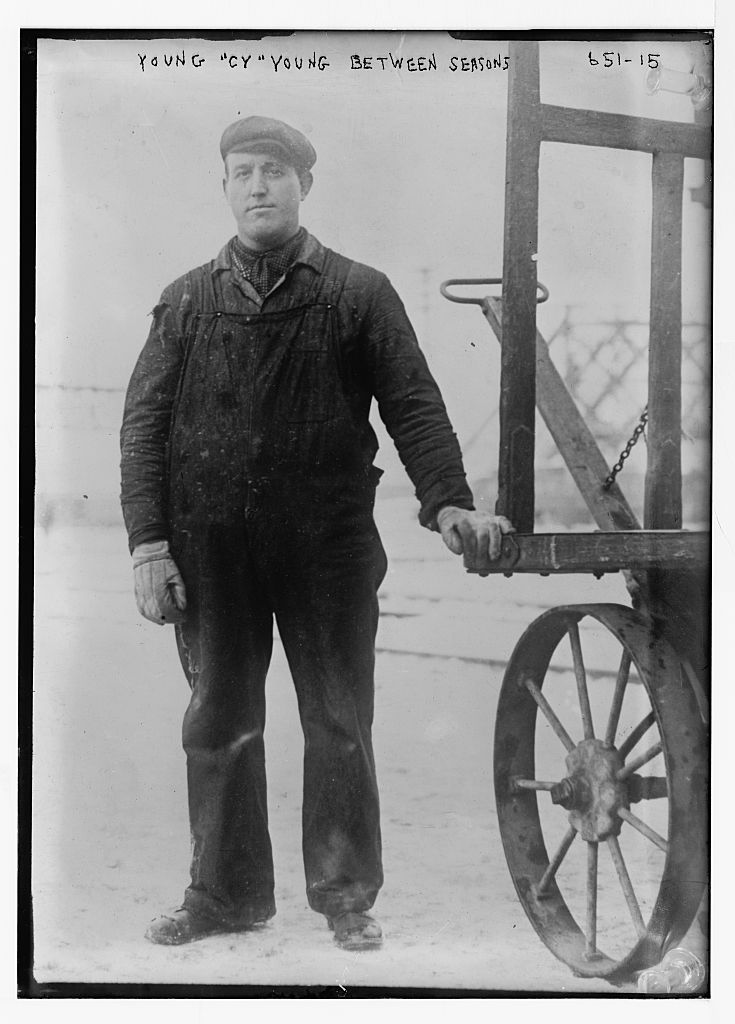
- Young between seasons, c. 1909
- Pitcher
- Born: July 21, 1877; Columbia Falls, Maine, U.S.
- Died: January 14, 1935 (aged 57); Brewer, Maine, U.S.
- Batted: Left Threw: Left

MLB debut
- April 14, 1905, for the Boston Beaneaters

Last MLB appearance
- August 25, 1911, for the Chicago White Sox

MLB statistics
- Win–loss record: 63–95
- Earned run average: 3.11
- Strikeouts: 560
- Stats at Baseball Reference

Teams
- Boston Beaneaters/Doves (1904–1908); Pittsburgh Pirates (1908); Chicago White Sox (1910–1911)

Irving Melrose Young (July 21, 1877 – January 14, 1935) was an American professional baseball pitcher. He played six seasons in Major League Baseball from 1905 to 1911 for the Boston Beaneaters/Doves, Pittsburgh Pirates, and Chicago White Sox. He was sometimes nicknamed "Young Cy" as a nod to his older contemporary Cy Young.

Young is one of only two pitchers in modern (post–1900) baseball history to win 20 games for a team that lost 100 games, going 20–21 for the 51–103 Beaneaters of 1905. (The other pitcher to do it was Ned Garver for the 1951 St. Louis Browns, who went 20–12).
