= Hunter Lane =

American baseball player (1900–1994)

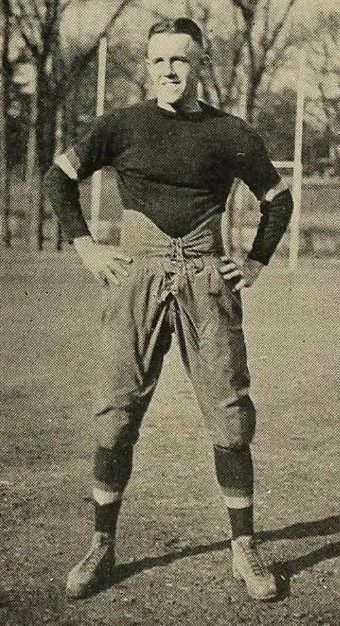
- Hunter "Dodo" Lane from The Volunteer 1921
- Third baseman
- Born: July 20, 1900; Pulaski, Tennessee
- Died: September 12, 1994 (aged 94); Memphis, Tennessee
- Batted: Right Threw: Right

MLB debut
- May 13, 1924, for the Boston Braves

Last MLB appearance
- June 26, 1924, for the Boston Braves

MLB statistics
- Games played: 7
- At bats: 15
- Hits: 1
- Stats at Baseball Reference

Teams
- Boston Braves (1924)

James Hunter Lane (July 20, 1900 – September 12, 1994) was a third baseman in Major League Baseball. He played for the Boston Braves in 1924. He also played college football as an end for the Tennessee Volunteers football team. He was known by the nickname "Dodo" Lane while playing for Tennessee.
