= Frank Emmer =

American baseball player (1896–1963)

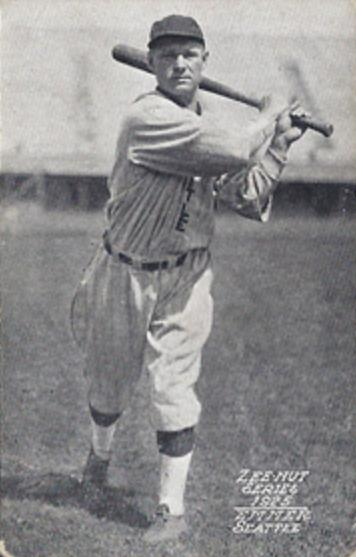
- Shortstop
- Born: February 17, 1896; Crestline, Ohio, U.S.
- Died: October 18, 1963 (aged 67); Homestead, Florida, U.S.
- Batted: Right Threw: Right

MLB debut
- April 25, 1916, for the Cincinnati Reds

Last MLB appearance
- July 28, 1926, for the Cincinnati Reds

MLB statistics
- Batting average: .182
- Home runs: 0
- Runs batted in: 20
- Stats at Baseball Reference

Teams
- Cincinnati Reds (1916, 1926)

Frank William Emmer (February 17, 1896 – October 18, 1963), born in Crestline, Ohio, was an American shortstop for the Cincinnati Reds (1916 and 1926).

In 2 seasons he played in 122 Games and had 313 At Bats, 30 Runs, 57 Hits, 10 Doubles, 7 Triples, 20 RBI, 2 Stolen Bases, 20 Walks, .182 Batting Average, .234 On-base percentage, .259 Slugging Percentage, 81 Total Bases and 17 Sacrifice Hits.

Emmer was born in the historical railroad town of Crestline, Ohio. He married Margaret Bronkar and raised their 2 daughters Vivian and Evelyn in Crestline. The family attended First English Lutheran Church. Emmer began his playing career in 1912 with Crestline semi-pro teams at the age of 16. Frank Kindinger, 80, 435 North Henry St., who was a mascot for several of the Crestline teams early in the 20th century, remembers that Emmer played with the old Main Street Dutch team and with the Crystal Rocks, who were sponsored by a brewing company. In the minor leagues, Emmer played with Charleston, W. Va., Portsmouth, Chillicothe, Dayton, Toledo and Columbus, Ohio, Maysville, Ky., Rock Island, Ill., London, Ontario, Canada, Flint, Mich. and Albany, NY. Emmer played for the Reds twice, first in 1916. He was the youngest Red, not being of legal age. He played 42 games and batted 202. In 1926 the Reds bought him from Seattle for a reported $15,000 in cash and two players. Emmer appeared in 80 games, made 44 hits in 224 times at bat for an average of 281. After his playing days were over, Emmer became captain of security guards at the Westinghouse plant in Mansfield for a number of years until retiring. He suffered a fatal heart attack in Florida. He died in Homestead, Florida, at the age of 67.

== Sources ==
- Career statistics from Baseball Reference · Baseball Reference (Minors) · Retrosheet · Baseball Almanac
