= Joe Muich =

American baseball player (1903-1993)

- Pitcher
- Born: November 23, 1903; St. Louis, Missouri, U.S.
- Died: July 2, 1993 (aged 89); St. Louis, Missouri, U.S.
- Batted: Right Threw: Right

MLB debut
- September 4, 1924, for the Boston Braves

Last MLB appearance
- September 19, 1924, for the Boston Braves

MLB statistics
- Win–loss record: 0–0
- Strikeouts: 1
- Earned run average: 11.00
- Stats at Baseball Reference

Teams
- Boston Braves (1924)

Ignatius Andrew Muich (November 23, 1903 – July 2, 1993) was an American Major League Baseball pitcher. He played one season with the Boston Braves in 1924.
