= Marty Shay =

American baseball player (1896–1951)

- Second baseman
- Born: April 25, 1896; Boston, Massachusetts, U.S.
- Died: February 20, 1951 (aged 54); Worcester, Massachusetts, U.S.
- Batted: Right Threw: Right

MLB debut
- September 16, 1916, for the Chicago Cubs

Last MLB appearance
- September 2, 1924, for the Boston Braves

MLB statistics
- Batting average: .240
- Home runs: 0
- Runs batted in: 2
- Stats at Baseball Reference

Teams
- Chicago Cubs (1916); Boston Braves (1924)

Arthur Joseph "Marty" Shay (April 25, 1896 – February 20, 1951) was an American professional baseball player. He played parts of two seasons in Major League Baseball for the Chicago Cubs (1916) and Boston Braves (1924), primarily as a second baseman. Listed at 5 ft 7 in, 148 lb, Shay batted and threw right-handed.

Born in Boston, Massachusetts, Shay was a .240 hitter (18-for-75) with three doubles and one triple in 21 games, stealing two bases and scoring four runs while driving in two more.

Shay played in the minor leagues from 1917 until 1927 in addition to his two brief stints in the majors with the Cubs and Braves. In 1130 minor league games, he batted .286 with one home run and collected 1259 hits, but only 174 were for extra bases.

Shay died in Worcester, Massachusetts, at the age of 54.

== Sources ==
- Career statistics from Baseball Reference · Baseball Reference (Minors) · Retrosheet · Baseball Almanac
