= Billy Zitzmann =

American baseball player (1895–1985)

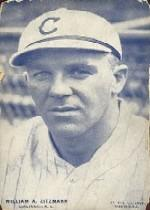
- Outfielder
- Born: November 19, 1895; Long Island City, New York, U.S.
- Died: May 29, 1985 (aged 89); Passaic, New Jersey, U.S.
- Batted: Right Threw: Right

MLB debut
- April 17, 1919, for the Pittsburgh Pirates

Last MLB appearance
- September 27, 1929, for the Cincinnati Reds

MLB statistics
- Batting average: .267
- Home runs: 3
- Runs batted in: 89
- Stats at Baseball Reference

Teams
- Pittsburgh Pirates (1919); Cincinnati Reds (1919, 1925–1929)

William Arthur Zitzmann (November 19, 1895 – May 29, 1985) was an American professional baseball outfielder. He played all or part of six seasons in Major League Baseball, between 1919 and 1929, for the Pittsburgh Pirates and Cincinnati Reds. He batted right-handed and also threw right-handed. He weighed 175 lbs. He was born on November 19, 1895, in Long Island City, New York. He died on May 29, 1985, in Passaic, New Jersey.

In 406 games over six seasons, Zitzmann posted a .267 batting average (268-for-1004) with 197 runs, 3 home runs, 89 RBI, 42 stolen bases and 83 bases on balls.
