= Ed Taylor (infielder) =

American baseball player (1901-1992)

- Third baseman / Shortstop
- Born: November 17, 1901; Chicago, Illinois, U.S.
- Died: January 30, 1992 (aged 90); Chula Vista, California, U.S.
- Batted: Right Threw: Right

MLB debut
- April 14, 1926, for the Boston Braves

Last MLB appearance
- September 29, 1926, for the Boston Braves

MLB statistics
- Batting average: .268
- Home runs: 0
- Runs batted in: 33
- Stats at Baseball Reference

Teams
- Boston Braves (1926)

Edward James Taylor (November 17, 1901 – January 30, 1992) was an American professional baseball player. He was a third baseman and shortstop for one season (1926) with the Boston Braves. He compiled a .268 batting average in 272 at-bats, with 33 runs batted in.

== Career ==
Taylor had the distinction of being the third baseman when Babe Herman of the Brooklyn Robins "doubled into a double play" on August 15, 1926. With one out and the bases loaded, Herman hit the ball off the right field wall at Ebbets Field and tried to stretch a double into a triple. Chick Fewster, who had been on first, advanced to third base – which was already occupied by Dazzy Vance, who had started slowly from second base because he thought the ball might be caught, got in a rundown between third and home, and was rushing back to third. All three men ended up on third base, with Herman not having watched the play in front of him. Taylor tagged them all, to be sure of getting as many outs as possible. The slow-footed Vance had been a major contributor to the situation, but he was the lead runner and not forced to advance, so according to the rules, he was entitled to the base, and umpire Beans Reardon called Herman and Fewster out, ending the inning. However, Hank DeBerry, who had started the play as a runner on third, scored the winning run the play before the daffiness began.

== Personal life ==
He was born in Chicago and died in Chula Vista, California at the age of 90.
