= Horace Kibbie =

American baseball player (1903-1975)

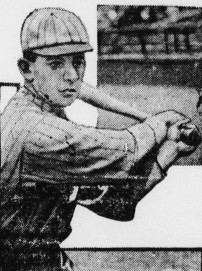
- Second baseman
- Born: July 18, 1903; Fort Worth, Texas, U.S.
- Died: October 19, 1975 (aged 72); Fort Worth, Texas, U.S.
- Batted: Right Threw: Right

MLB debut
- June 13, 1925, for the Boston Braves

Last MLB appearance
- June 24, 1925, for the Boston Braves

MLB statistics
- Batting average: .268
- Home runs: 0
- Runs batted in: 2
- Stats at Baseball Reference

Teams
- Boston Braves (1925)

Horace Kent "Hod" Kibbie (July 18, 1903 – October 19, 1975) was an American professional baseball player and physician in Fort Worth. He played eleven games in Major League Baseball in 1925 for the Boston Braves, eight as a second baseman and three as a shortstop. He went on to play shortstop for the Fort Worth Cats in 1927 and 1928.

Kibbie was captain of the baseball team at University of Texas, where he played from 1921 to 1925. He was a medical student while playing for the Cats, graduating from the University of Louisville School of Medicine. In 1933, he returned to Fort Worth to practice medicine. He was the physician for employees of the Santa Fe Railroad, as well as the city of Fort Worth.
