= Joe Ogrodowski =

American baseball player (1906-1959)

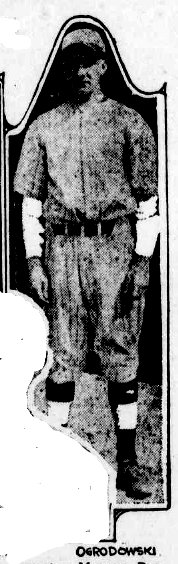
- Pitcher
- Born: November 20, 1906; Hoytville, Pennsylvania, U.S.
- Died: June 24, 1959 (aged 52); Elmira, New York, U.S.
- Batted: Right Threw: Right

MLB debut
- April 27, 1925, for the Boston Braves

Last MLB appearance
- April 27, 1925, for the Boston Braves

MLB statistics
- Win–loss record: 0–0
- Strikeouts: 0
- Earned run average: 54.00
- Stats at Baseball Reference

Teams
- Boston Braves (1925)

Joseph Anthony Ogrodowski (November 20, 1906 – June 24, 1959) was an American Major League Baseball pitcher. He played one game with the Boston Braves on April 27, 1925. Ogrodowski gave up six earned runs on six hits and three walks in one inning of relief for the Braves in the 7th inning against the Brooklyn Robins in a 15-2 loss.
