= Dinty Gearin =

American baseball player (1897-1959)

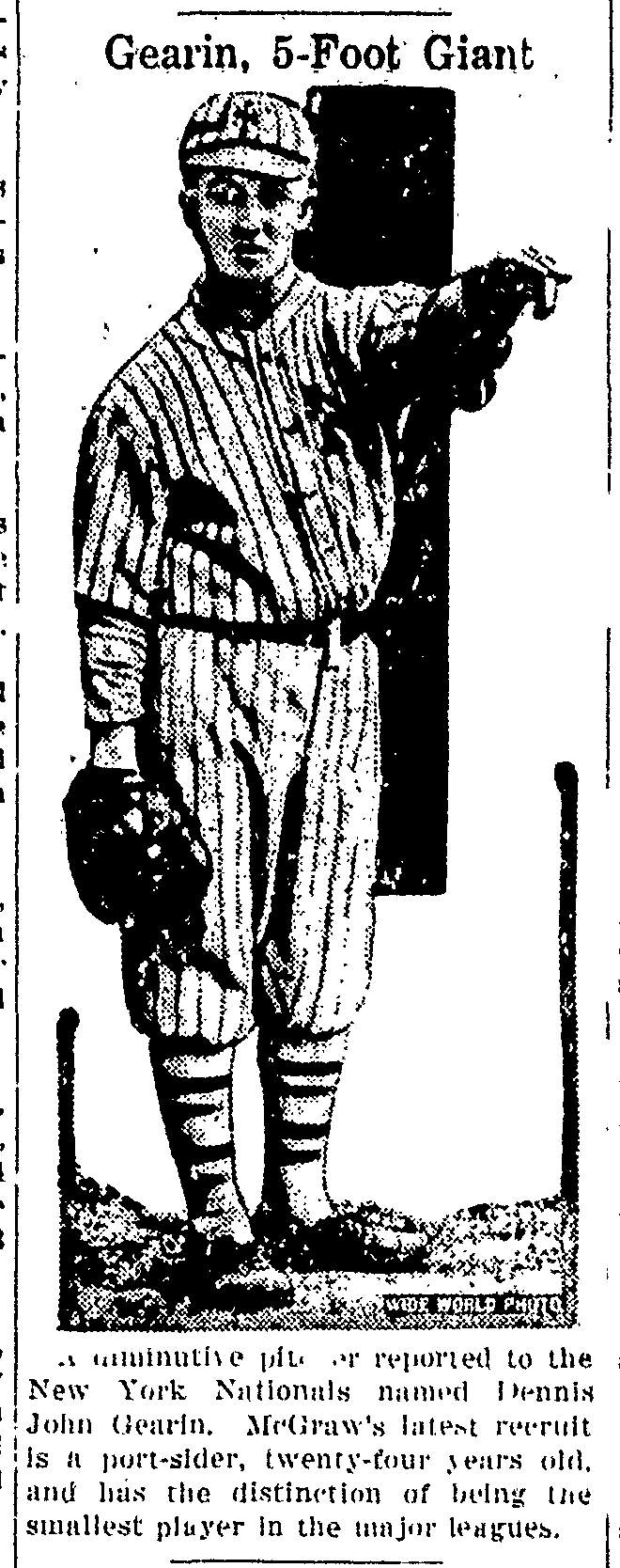
- Pitcher
- Born: October 15, 1897; Providence, Rhode Island, U.S.
- Died: March 11, 1959 (aged 61); Providence, Rhode Island, U.S.
- Batted: Left Threw: Left

MLB debut
- August 6, 1923, for the New York Giants

Last MLB appearance
- May 31, 1924, for the Boston Braves

MLB statistics
- Win–loss record: 2–4
- Strikeouts: 13
- Earned run average: 3.74
- Stats at Baseball Reference

Teams
- New York Giants (1923–1924); Boston Braves (1924)

Dennis John Gearin (October 15, 1897 – March 11, 1959) was an American Major League Baseball pitcher. He spent most of his career (1915, 1918-1931) in the minors, playing mostly for the Milwaukee Brewers of the American Association. He played two seasons with the New York Giants (1923–1924) and Boston Braves (1924).

In his only appearance for the Braves, he gave up five earned runs on three hits and two walks without recording an out in a 14-8 loss to the Brooklyn Robins, thus giving him an infinite ERA with the team.
