= Bill Anderson (1920s pitcher) =

American baseball player (1895-1983)

- Pitcher
- Born: November 28, 1895; Boston, Massachusetts, U.S.
- Died: March 13, 1983 (aged 87); Medford, Massachusetts, U.S.
- Batted: Right Threw: Left

MLB debut
- September 10, 1925, for the Boston Braves

Last MLB appearance
- September 17, 1925, for the Boston Braves

MLB statistics
- Win–loss record: 0–0
- Earned run average: 10.13
- Strikeouts: 1
- Stats at Baseball Reference

Teams
- Boston Braves (1925)

William Edward Anderson (November 28, 1895 – March 13, 1983), nicknamed "Lefty", was an American Major League Baseball pitcher. Anderson played for the Boston Braves in 1925. In two career games, he had a 0–0 record with a 10.13 ERA. He batted right-handed and threw left-handed.
