= Johnny Werts =

American baseball player (1898-1990)

- Pitcher
- Born: April 20, 1898; Pomaria, South Carolina, U.S.
- Died: September 24, 1990 (aged 92); Newberry, South Carolina, U.S.
- Batted: Right Threw: Right

MLB debut
- April 14, 1926, for the Boston Braves

Last MLB appearance
- May 22, 1929, for the Boston Braves

MLB statistics
- Win–loss record: 15-21
- Earned run average: 4.29
- Strikeouts: 111
- Stats at Baseball Reference

Teams
- Boston Braves (1926–1929)

Henry Levi "Johnny" Werts (April 20, 1898 – September 24, 1990) was an American right-handed Major League Baseball pitcher who played for the Boston Braves from 1926 to 1929. His last name was also spelled Wertz.

He made his major league debut on April 14, 1926 at the age of 27, approximately a week shy of his 28th birthday. He went 11–8 in his rookie season, posting a 3.28 ERA in 32 games (23 starts) and finishing second on the team in wins, trailing only Larry Benton's 14. He finished second in the league in hit batsmen, behind only Don Songer.

In 1927, he went 4–10 with a 4.55 ERA in 42 games (15 starts), walking 52 batters and striking out only 39. His six wild pitches were third most in the National League that season. In each of the next two seasons, he appeared in only 10 games and four games respectively, going 0–2 with a 10.31 ERA in 1928 and 0–0 with a 10.50 ERA in 1929. He appeared in his final game on May 22.

On June 2, 1928, he was traded with Jimmy Cooney and Luke Urban to the Buffalo Bisons for Bonnie Hollingsworth.

Overall, Werts went 15–21 with a 4.29 ERA in his four-year major league career. In 378 innings, he allowed 460 hits and 111 walks, while striking out 111 batters.

He also spent seven years playing in the minor leagues, going 59–62 in 218 games. In 1924, he posted a 2.79 ERA despite going 16–17.

Following his death, he was interred at St. Paul Lutheran Church Cemetery in Newberry, South Carolina.
