= Dave Harris (baseball) =

American baseball player (1900–1973)

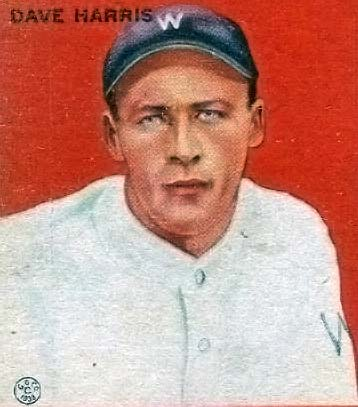
- Outfielder
- Born: July 14, 1900; Summerfield, North Carolina, U.S.
- Died: September 18, 1973 (aged 73); Atlanta, Georgia, U.S.
- Batted: Right Threw: Right

MLB debut
- April 14, 1925, for the Boston Braves

Last MLB appearance
- September 15, 1934, for the Washington Senators

MLB statistics
- Batting average: .281
- Home runs: 32
- Runs batted in: 247
- Stats at Baseball Reference

Teams
- Boston Braves (1925, 1928); Chicago White Sox (1930); Washington Senators (1930–1934)

David Stanley Harris (July 14, 1900 – September 18, 1973) was an American professional baseball player who played outfield in the Major Leagues from 1925 to 1934. He played for the Boston Braves, Chicago White Sox, and Washington Senators.

On August 5, 1932 Harris broke up a potential perfect game by Tommy Bridges, of the Detroit Tigers, as the 27th batter. The pitcher was due up to bat before Washington Senators manager Walter Johnson sent Harris in to pinch hit. Harris singled off of Bridges. Harris ended up leading the American League with fourteen pinch hits. 1932 was also the year in which Harris finished 19th in the MVP voting.

In 542 games over seven seasons, Harris hit.281 (406-for-1447) with 243 runs scored, 74 doubles, 33 triples, 32 home runs, 247 RBI, 196 walks, an on-base percentage of.368 and a slugging percentage of.444. He compiled a career.963 fielding percentage.
