= Wade Lefler =

American baseball player

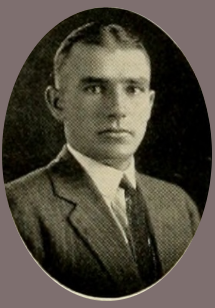
- Outfielder
- Born: June 5, 1896; Cooleemee, North Carolina, U.S.
- Died: March 6, 1981 (aged 84); Hickory, North Carolina, U.S.
- Batted: Left Threw: Right

MLB debut
- April 16, 1924, for the Boston Braves

Last MLB appearance
- September 30, 1924, for the Washington Senators

MLB statistics
- Batting average: .556
- Slugging average: .889
- Runs batted in: 4
- Stats at Baseball Reference

Teams
- Boston Braves (1924); Washington Senators (1924)

Wade Hampton Lefler (June 5, 1896 – March 6, 1981) was an American Major League Baseball player. He played in six games for two different major league teams in 1924, mostly as a pinch hitter. He also played in one game as a right fielder. He was the first player to make the major leagues after attending Duke University.

After playing several years in the minor leagues, most recently for the Worcester Panthers in 1923, Lefler made his debut for the Boston Braves on April 16, 1924, the second game of the season for the Braves. His stint with the Braves lasted just a single plate appearance, in which he struck out while pinch hitting for pitcher Rube Marquard. After the game, he returned to the Panthers, where he played most of the rest of 1924, batting .370 with 14 home runs.

Wade Lavender Lefler returned to the majors with the Washington Senators on September 18. He appeared four more times as a pinch hitter, once pinch hitting for Walter Johnson. In those four opportunities, he hit safely three times, including two doubles. On September 30, he started his first game, playing right field and batting cleanup. In four at bats, he had two more hits, including another double. This turned out to be Lefler's last appearance in the majors, leaving him with a career batting average of .556, and a career slugging average of .889.

After his brief major league career, Lefler played one more season in the minor leagues with the Memphis Chickasaws before retiring. He went on to become an attorney, serving as the city attorney for Newton, North Carolina. He died in 1981 at the age of 84.

== Sources ==
- Career statistics from Baseball Reference · Baseball Reference (Minors) · Retrosheet · Baseball Almanac
