= Bunny Hearn (1920s pitcher) =

American baseball player (1904-1974)

- Pitcher
- Born: January 13, 1904; Brooklyn, New York, U.S.
- Died: March 31, 1974 (aged 70); Venice, Florida, U.S.
- Batted: Left Threw: Left

MLB debut
- April 13, 1926, for the Boston Braves

Last MLB appearance
- June 25, 1929, for the Boston Braves

MLB statistics
- Win–loss record: 7–11
- Earned run average: 4.38
- Strikeouts: 65
- Stats at Baseball Reference

Teams
- Boston Braves (1926–1929)

Elmer Lafayette "Bunny" Hearn (January 13, 1904 – March 31, 1974) was an American pitcher in Major League Baseball. He played for the Boston Braves.

Hearn was a successful semi-professional baseball player in New York City even in his early teens before attending Bushwick High School. He was nicknamed "Bunny" because of his diminutive size. His contract was purchased by the Boston Braves in December 1925 following a season with the minor league Bridgeport Bears.

He moved to the Tampa Bay area in 1963 from Queens Village, New York after having retired from the Brooklyn Union Gas Company.
