= Abie Hood =

American baseball player (1903-1988)

- Second baseman
- Born: January 31, 1903; Sanford, North Carolina, U.S.
- Died: October 14, 1988 (aged 85); Chesapeake, Virginia, U.S.
- Batted: Left Threw: Right

MLB debut
- July 13, 1925, for the Boston Braves

Last MLB appearance
- July 17, 1925, for the Boston Braves

MLB statistics
- Batting average: .286
- Home runs: 1
- Runs batted in: 2
- Stats at Baseball Reference

Teams
- Boston Braves (1925)

Albie Larrison Hood (January 13, 1903 – October 14, 1988) was an American former Major League Baseball player. He played one season with the Boston Braves between July 13 and July 17, 1925. In only five games with the Braves, he managed a home run, two doubles and three singles.
