= Cuckoo Christensen =

American baseball player (1899–1984)

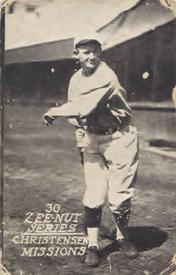
- Outfielder
- Born: October 4, 1899; San Francisco, California, U.S.
- Died: December 20, 1984 (aged 85); Menlo Park, California, U.S.
- Batted: Left Threw: Left

MLB debut
- April 13, 1926, for the Cincinnati Reds

Last MLB appearance
- August 4, 1927, for the Cincinnati Reds

MLB statistics
- Batting average: .315
- Home runs: 0
- Runs batted in: 57
- Stats at Baseball Reference

Teams
- Cincinnati Reds (1926–1927)

Walter Niels "Cuckoo" Christensen (October 24, 1899 – December 20, 1984) was an American baseball outfielder for the Cincinnati Reds (1926-1927).

Christensen led the National League in on-base percentage (.426) in 1926. In two seasons, he played in 171 games and had 514 at bats, 66 runs, 162 hits, 21 doubles, 7 triples, 57 RBIs, 12 stolen bases, 60 walks, a .315 batting average, .392 on-base percentage, .383 slugging percentage, 197 total bases and 16 sacrifice hits. Defensively, he posted a .970 fielding percentage playing at all three outfield positions.

Christensen played with the Milwaukee Brewers of the American Association between 1930 and 1933, hitting .362, .325, .325 and .307.

He died in Menlo Park, California, at the age of 85.

== Sources ==
- Career statistics from Baseball Reference · Fangraphs · Baseball Reference (Minors) · Retrosheet · Baseball Almanac
