= Oscar Siemer =

American baseball player (1901-1959)

- Catcher
- Born: August 14, 1901; St. Louis, Missouri, U.S.
- Died: December 5, 1959 (aged 58); St. Louis, Missouri, U.S.
- Batted: Right Threw: Right

MLB debut
- May 20, 1925, for the Boston Braves

Last MLB appearance
- September 18, 1926, for the Boston Braves

MLB statistics
- Batting average: .244
- Home runs: 1
- Runs batted in: 11
- Stats at Baseball Reference

Teams
- Boston Braves (1925–1926)

Oscar Sylvester "Cotton" Siemer (August 14, 1901 – December 5, 1959) was an American Major League Baseball player. He played two seasons with the Boston Braves from 1925 to 1926.
