= Doc Gautreau =

American baseball player, manager, and scout (1901-1970)

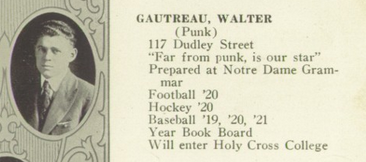
- Second baseman
- Born: July 26, 1901; Cambridge, Massachusetts, U.S.
- Died: August 23, 1970 (aged 69); Salt Lake City, U.S.
- Batted: Right Threw: Right

MLB debut
- June 22, 1925, for the Philadelphia Athletics

Last MLB appearance
- September 29, 1928, for the Boston Braves

MLB statistics
- Batting average: .257
- Home runs: 0
- Runs batted in: 52
- Stats at Baseball Reference

Teams
- Philadelphia Athletics (1925); Boston Braves (1925–1928)

Walter Paul "Doc" Gautreau (July 26, 1901 – August 23, 1970) was an American professional baseball player, manager and scout. The native of Cambridge, Massachusetts, was a second baseman during his playing days who stood a diminutive 5 feet 2 inches (1.57 m) tall and weighed 129 pounds (59 kg). He threw and batted right-handed.

== Career ==
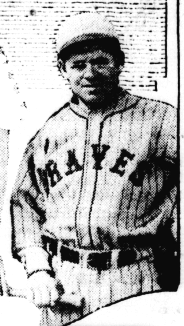
Gautreau with the Boston Braves in 1926.

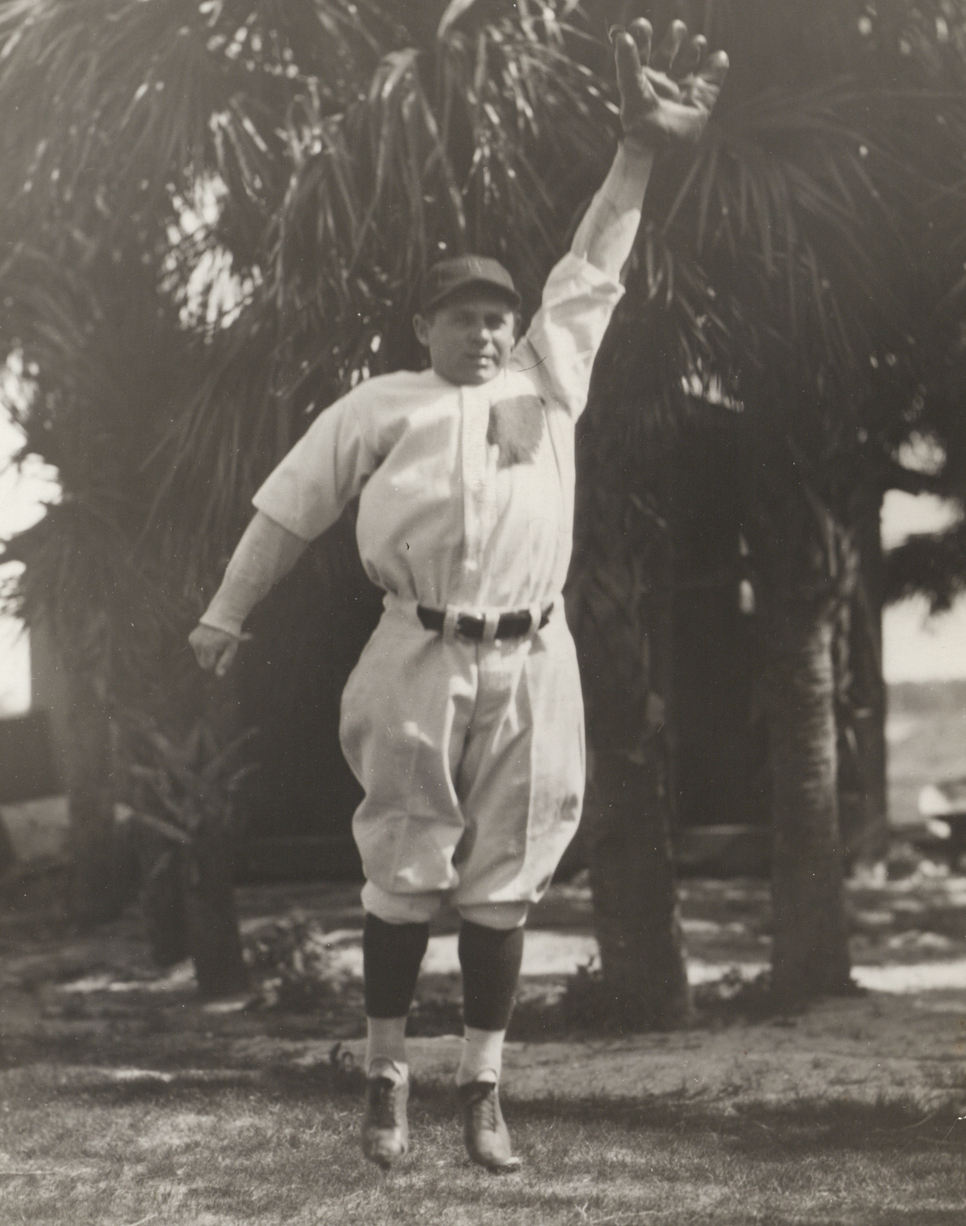
Walter-Paul Gautreau, 1901-1970

Gautreau attended The College of the Holy Cross in Worcester, Massachusetts, and the Crusaders went 92-8-1 during his tenure as the team's second baseman. He played his first year of professional baseball in 1925, making his debut in the Major Leagues that June as a member of the Philadelphia Athletics. After four games played and seven hitless at bats, his contract was sold to the Boston Braves of the National League in July.

Gautreau's batting then picked up, as he hit .267 for the Braves that season, and won a job as a part-time player in 1926 and 1927. His tenure with the Braves was curtailed, however, when Boston obtained future Baseball Hall of Fame second baseman Rogers Hornsby for the 1928 campaign. Gautreau spent most of that season in the Class A Eastern League and made his final Major League appearance at the end of September. All told, he appeared in 261 games over four big-league seasons (1925–1928), and batted .257 with 207 hits and 40 stolen bases.

Upon leaving the Majors, Gautreau became a regular with the Montreal Royals of the International League, playing with them for five seasons, including two as playing manager.

== Later life ==
After his career in uniform, he scouted for the Braves in both Boston and Milwaukee, as well as with the Los Angeles/California Angels.

He died in Salt Lake City, Utah, at age 69.
