= Ed Sperber =

American baseball player (1895-1976)

- Outfielder
- Born: January 21, 1895; Cincinnati, Ohio, US
- Died: January 5, 1976 (aged 80); Cincinnati, Ohio, US
- Batted: Left Threw: Left

MLB debut
- April 16, 1924, for the Boston Braves

Last MLB appearance
- May 1, 1925, for the Boston Braves

MLB statistics
- Batting average: .279
- Home runs: 1
- Runs batted in: 12
- Stats at Baseball Reference

Teams
- Boston Braves (1924–1925)

Edwin George Sperber (January 21, 1895 – January 5, 1976) was an American professional baseball outfielder. He played in Major League Baseball (MLB) for two seasons for the Boston Braves.
