= Ike Kamp =

American baseball player (1900–1955)

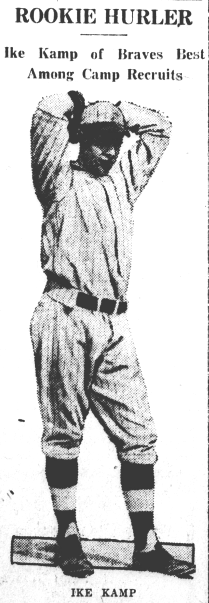
- Pitcher
- Born: September 5, 1900; Roxbury, Massachusetts, U.S.
- Died: February 25, 1955 (aged 54); Boston, Massachusetts, U.S.
- Batted: Both Threw: Left

MLB debut
- September 16, 1924, for the Boston Braves

Last MLB appearance
- September 21, 1925, for the Boston Braves

MLB statistics
- Win–loss record: 2–5
- Earned run average: 5.10
- Strikeouts: 24
- Stats at Baseball Reference

Teams
- Boston Braves (1924–1925)

Alphonse Francis Kamp (September 5, 1900 – February 25, 1955) was an American Major League Baseball (MLB) pitcher. He played two seasons with the Boston Braves from 1924 to 1925.
