= Kyle Graham =

American baseball player (1899–1973)

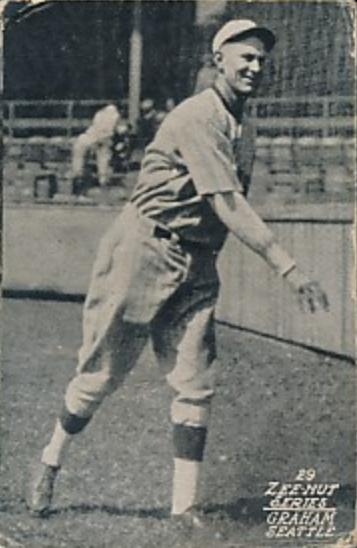
- Skinny Graham, Boston Braves
- Pitcher
- Born: August 14, 1899; Oak Grove, Alabama
- Died: December 1, 1973 (aged 74); Oak Grove, Alabama
- Batted: Right Threw: Right

MLB debut
- September 3, 1924, for the Boston Braves

Last MLB appearance
- September 21, 1929, for the Detroit Tigers

MLB statistics
- Win–loss record: 11–22
- Strikeouts: 61
- ERA: 5.02
- Stats at Baseball Reference

Teams
- Boston Braves (1924–1926); Detroit Tigers (1929)

Kyle Graham (August 14, 1899 – December 1, 1973), sometimes known by the nickname "Skinny Graham", was an American baseball pitcher. He played professional baseball for eight years from 1923 to 1930, including four seasons in Major League Baseball for the Boston Braves (1924–1926) and Detroit Tigers (1929). A 6 ft 2 in (1.88 m), 172-pound right-hander, he appeared in 67 major league games, 37 as a starter, and ended his career with an 11–22 win–loss record and a 5.02 earned run average (ERA).

== Early years ==
Graham was born in Oak Grove, Alabama, in 1899.

== Professional baseball ==
Graham began his professional baseball career in 1923 with the Little Rock Travelers of the Southern Association, appearing in 51 games and compiling a 13–15 record and a 4.37 ERA.

In 1924, Graham was acquired by the Boston Braves and made his major league debut on September 3, 1924. He appeared in five games at the end of the 1924 season and compiled an 0–4 record. In 1925, he appeared in a career high 34 games and compiled a 7–12 record with a 4.41 ERA. He appeared in 15 games for the Braves in 1926, compiling a 3–3 record with a 7.93 ERA. He was released by the Braves on July 8, 1926.

After his release by the Braves, Graham spent the next three years from 1927 to 1929 playing for the Seattle Indians in the Pacific Coast League. In three seasons for the Indians, he compiled a 29–38 record.

Late in the 1929 season, Graham returned briefly to the major leagues, appearing in 13 games for the Detroit Tigers. He compiled a 1–3 record with a 5.57 ERA in 51-2/3 innings pitched. He appeared in his final major league game on September 21, 1929.

Graham concluded his playing career in 1930 with the Toronto Maple Leafs in the International League, compiling a 9–4 record with a 4.50 ERA.

== Later years ==
Graham died in 1973 in Oak Grove, Alabama, at age 74. He was buried at the Oak Grove Baptist Church Cemetery.
