= Frank Wilson (baseball) =

American baseball player (1901–1974)

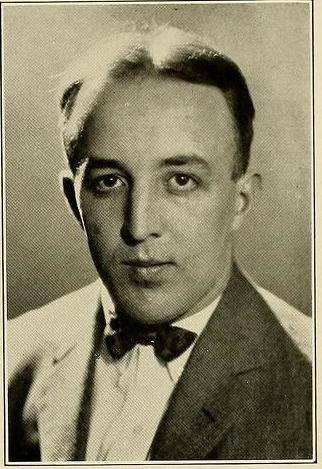
- Left fielder
- Born: April 20, 1901; Malden, Massachusetts, U.S.
- Died: November 25, 1974 (aged 73); Leicester, Massachusetts, U.S.
- Batted: Left Threw: Right

MLB debut
- June 20, 1924, for the Pittsburgh Pirates

Last MLB appearance
- July 2, 1928, for the St. Louis Browns

MLB statistics
- Batting average: .246
- Home runs: 1
- Runs batted in: 38
- Stats at Baseball Reference

Teams
- Boston Braves (1924–26); Cleveland Indians (1928); St. Louis Browns (1928)

Francis Edward Wilson (April 20, 1901 – November 25, 1974), nicknamed "Squash", was an American professional baseball player. He played all or part of four seasons in Major League Baseball, primarily as a left fielder. He played for the Boston Braves from 1924 to 1926, and the Cleveland Indians and St. Louis Browns in 1928.
