= Joe Genewich =

American baseball player (1897-1985)

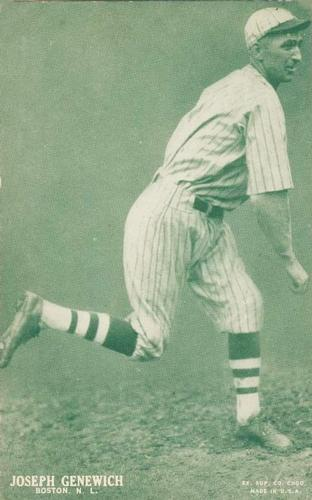
- Pitcher
- Born: January 15, 1897; Elmira, New York, U.S.
- Died: December 21, 1985 (aged 88); Lockport, New York, U.S.
- Batted: Right Threw: Right

MLB debut
- September 3, 1922, for the Boston Braves

Last MLB appearance
- July 27, 1930, for the New York Giants

MLB statistics
- Win–loss record: 73–92
- Earned run average: 4.29
- Strikeouts: 316
- Stats at Baseball Reference

Teams
- Boston Braves (1922–1928); New York Giants (1928–1930)

Joseph Edward Genewich (January 15, 1897 – December 21, 1985) was an American pitcher in Major League Baseball. He played for the Boston Braves and New York Giants from 1922 to 1930. His key pitch was the slow curve.

Genewich attended the Elmira Free Academy but was not allowed to play for its baseball team because he was the son of a Polish mill worker. Genewich went directly from sandlot ball to the Boston Braves without playing minor league baseball.

Genewich served in the United States Navy and played baseball at Naval Station Great Lakes during World War I and enlisted again in 1942 during World War II.
