= 1927 Brooklyn Robins season =

1927 Brooklyn Robins
- League: National League
- Ballpark: Ebbets Field
- City: Brooklyn, New York
- Record: 65–88 (.425)
- League place: 6th
- Owners: Stephen McKeever, Brooklyn Trust Company
- President: Wilbert Robinson
- Managers: Wilbert Robinson

The 1927 Brooklyn Robins had another bad year. They tied a National League record on May 21 by using five pitchers in the eighth inning.

== Offseason ==
- January 9, 1927: Burleigh Grimes was traded by the Robins to the New York Giants as part of a three-team trade. The Philadelphia Phillies sent Butch Henline to the Robins and George Harper to the Giants. The Giants sent Jack Scott and Fresco Thompson to the Phillies.
- March 29, 1927: Mickey O'Neil was purchased from the Robins by the Washington Senators.

== Regular season ==
=== Season standings ===
National League
Team	W	L	Pct.	GB	Home	Road
Pittsburgh Pirates	94	60	.610	—	48‍–‍31	46‍–‍29
St. Louis Cardinals	92	61	.601	1½	55‍–‍25	37‍–‍36
New York Giants	92	62	.597	2	49‍–‍25	43‍–‍37
Chicago Cubs	85	68	.556	8½	50‍–‍28	35‍–‍40
Cincinnati Reds	75	78	.490	18½	45‍–‍35	30‍–‍43
Brooklyn Robins	65	88	.425	28½	34‍–‍39	31‍–‍49
Boston Braves	60	94	.390	34	32‍–‍41	28‍–‍53
Philadelphia Phillies	51	103	.331	43	34‍–‍43	17‍–‍60

=== Record vs. opponents ===
1927 National League record Sources:
Team	BSN	BRO	CHC	CIN	NYG	PHI	PIT	STL
Boston	—	12–10	7–15	4–18	7–15	14–8	9–13–1	7–15
Brooklyn	10–12	—	7–15	11–10	10–12–1	11–11	8–14	8–14
Chicago	15–7	15–7	—	14–8	10–12	13–9	9–13	9–12
Cincinnati	18–4	10–11	8–14	—	7–15	16–6	8–14	8–14
New York	15–7	12–10–1	12–10	15–7	—	15–7	11–11	12–10
Philadelphia	8–14	11–11	9–13	6–16	7–15	—	7–15–1	3–19
Pittsburgh	13–9–1	14–8	13–9	14–8	11–11	15–7–1	—	14–8
St. Louis	15–7	14–8	12–9	14–8	10–12	19–3	8–14	—

=== Notable transactions ===
- May 3, 1927: Bob McGraw was traded by the Robins to the St. Louis Cardinals for Jake Flowers.

=== Roster ===
1927 Brooklyn Robins
Roster
Pitchers: Jesse Barnes; Guy Cantrell; Watty Clark; Bill Doak; Rube Ehrhardt; Jumbo Elliott; Bob McGraw; Doug McWeeny; Ray Moss; Jesse Petty; Norman Plitt; Dazzy Vance	Catchers: Hank DeBerry; Charlie Hargreaves; Butch Henline; Infielders: Bob Barrett; Johnny Butler; Chuck Corgan; Jake Flowers; Babe Herman; William Marriott; Jay Partridge	Outfielders: Max Carey; Gus Felix; Harvey Hendrick; Merwin Jacobson; Irish Meusel; Oscar Roettger; Jigger Statz; Overton Tremper; Other batters: Chick Fewster	Manager: Wilbert Robinson; Coaches: Otto Miller

== Player stats ==
=== Batting ===
==== Starters by position ====
Note: Pos = Position; G = Games played; AB = At bats; H = Hits; Avg. = Batting average; HR = Home runs; RBI = Runs batted in

Pos	Player	G	AB	H	Avg.	HR	RBI
C	Hank DeBerry	68	201	47	.234	1	21
1B	Babe Herman	130	412	112	.272	14	73
2B	Jay Partridge	146	572	149	.260	7	40
3B	Bob Barrett	99	355	92	.259	5	38
SS	Johnny Butler	149	521	124	.238	2	57
OF	Max Carey	144	538	143	.266	1	54
OF	Jigger Statz	130	507	139	.274	1	21
OF	Gus Felix	130	445	118	.265	0	57

==== Other batters ====
Note: G = Games played; AB = At bats; H = Hits; Avg. = Batting average; HR = Home runs; RBI = Runs batted in

Player	G	AB	H	Avg.	HR	RBI
Harvey Hendrick	128	458	142	.310	4	50
Jake Flowers	67	231	54	.234	2	20
Butch Henline	67	177	47	.266	1	18
Charlie Hargreaves	46	133	38	.286	0	11
Irish Meusel	42	74	18	.243	1	7
Overton Tremper	26	60	14	.233	0	4
Chuck Corgan	19	57	15	.263	0	1
William Marriott	6	9	1	.111	0	1
Merwin Jacobson	11	6	0	.000	0	1
Oscar Roettger	5	4	0	.000	0	0
Chick Fewster	4	1	0	.000	0	0

=== Pitching ===
==== Starting pitchers ====
Note: G = Games pitched; IP = Innings pitched; W = Wins; L = Losses; ERA = Earned run average; SO = Strikeouts

Player	G	IP	W	L	ERA	SO
Dazzy Vance	34	273.1	16	15	2.70	184
Jesse Petty	42	271.2	13	18	2.98	101
Jumbo Elliott	30	188.1	6	13	3.30	99
Bill Doak	27	145.0	11	8	3.48	32
Ray Moss	1	8.1	1	0	3.24	1
Bob McGraw	1	4.0	0	1	9.00	2

==== Other pitchers ====
Note: G = Games pitched; IP = Innings pitched; W = Wins; L = Losses; ERA = Earned run average; SO = Strikeouts

Player	G	IP	W	L	ERA	SO
Doug McWeeny	34	164.1	4	8	3.56	73
Jesse Barnes	18	78.2	2	10	5.72	14
Norman Plitt	19	62.1	2	6	4.91	9

==== Relief pitchers ====
Note: G = Games pitched; W = Wins; L = Losses; SV = Saves; ERA = Earned run average; SO = Strikeouts

Player	G	W	L	SV	ERA	SO
Rube Ehrhardt	46	3	7	2	3.57	22
Watty Clark	27	7	2	2	2.32	32
Guy Cantrell	6	0	0	0	2.70	5
