= 1927 Boston Braves season =

1927 Boston Braves
- League: National League
- Ballpark: Braves Field
- City: Boston, Massachusetts
- Record: 60–94 (.390)
- League place: 7th
- Owners: Emil Fuchs
- Managers: Dave Bancroft
- Radio: WNAC (Fred Hoey)

The 1927 Boston Braves season was the 57th season of the franchise. The Braves finished seventh in the National League with a record of 60 wins and 94 losses.

== Regular season ==
=== Season standings ===
National League
Team	W	L	Pct.	GB	Home	Road
Pittsburgh Pirates	94	60	.610	—	48‍–‍31	46‍–‍29
St. Louis Cardinals	92	61	.601	1½	55‍–‍25	37‍–‍36
New York Giants	92	62	.597	2	49‍–‍25	43‍–‍37
Chicago Cubs	85	68	.556	8½	50‍–‍28	35‍–‍40
Cincinnati Reds	75	78	.490	18½	45‍–‍35	30‍–‍43
Brooklyn Robins	65	88	.425	28½	34‍–‍39	31‍–‍49
Boston Braves	60	94	.390	34	32‍–‍41	28‍–‍53
Philadelphia Phillies	51	103	.331	43	34‍–‍43	17‍–‍60

=== Record vs. opponents ===
1927 National League record Sources:
Team	BSN	BRO	CHC	CIN	NYG	PHI	PIT	STL
Boston	—	12–10	7–15	4–18	7–15	14–8	9–13–1	7–15
Brooklyn	10–12	—	7–15	11–10	10–12–1	11–11	8–14	8–14
Chicago	15–7	15–7	—	14–8	10–12	13–9	9–13	9–12
Cincinnati	18–4	10–11	8–14	—	7–15	16–6	8–14	8–14
New York	15–7	12–10–1	12–10	15–7	—	15–7	11–11	12–10
Philadelphia	8–14	11–11	9–13	6–16	7–15	—	7–15–1	3–19
Pittsburgh	13–9–1	14–8	13–9	14–8	11–11	15–7–1	—	14–8
St. Louis	15–7	14–8	12–9	14–8	10–12	19–3	8–14	—

=== Roster ===
1927 Boston Braves
Roster
Pitchers: Larry Benton; Foster Edwards; Joe Genewich; Hal Goldsmith; Kent Greenfield; Bunny Hearn; Jack Knight; Hugh McQuillan; Art Mills; George Mogridge; Guy Morrison; Charlie Robertson; Dick Rudolph; Bob Smith; Johnny Werts	Catchers: Frank Gibson; Shanty Hogan; Zack Taylor; Luke Urban; Infielders: Dave Bancroft; Dick Burrus; Doc Farrell; Jack Fournier; Doc Gautreau; Andy High; Eddie Moore; Herb Thomas	Outfielders: Eddie Brown; Earl Clark; Sid Graves; Les Mann; Dinny McNamara; Lance Richbourg; Jack Smith; Jimmy Welsh; Other batters: Johnny Cooney	Manager: Dave Bancroft

== Player stats ==
=== Batting ===
==== Starters by position ====
Note: Pos = Position; G = Games played; AB = At bats; H = Hits; Avg. = Batting average; HR = Home runs; RBI = Runs batted in

Pos	Player	G	AB	H	Avg.	HR	RBI
C	Shanty Hogan	71	229	66	.288	3	32
1B	Jack Fournier	122	374	106	.283	10	53
2B	Doc Gautreau	87	236	58	.246	0	20
SS	Dave Bancroft	111	375	91	.243	1	31
3B	Andy High	113	384	116	.302	4	46
OF	Eddie Brown	155	558	171	.306	2	75
OF	Lance Richbourg	115	450	139	.309	2	34
OF	Jimmy Welsh	131	497	143	.288	9	54

==== Other batters ====
Note: G = Games played; AB = At bats; H = Hits; Avg. = Batting average; HR = Home runs; RBI = Runs batted in

Player	G	AB	H	Avg.	HR	RBI
Doc Farrell	110	424	124	.292	1	58
Eddie Moore	112	411	124	.302	1	32
Dick Burrus	72	220	70	.318	0	32
Jack Smith	84	183	58	.317	1	24
Frank Gibson	60	167	37	.222	0	19
Luke Urban	35	111	32	.288	0	10
Zach Taylor	30	96	23	.240	1	14
Herb Thomas	24	74	17	.230	0	6
Leslie Mann	29	66	17	.258	0	6
Earl Clark	13	44	12	.273	0	3
Sid Graves	7	20	5	.250	0	2
Dinny McNamara	11	9	0	.000	0	0
Johnny Cooney	10	1	0	.000	0	0

=== Pitching ===
==== Starting pitchers ====
Note: G = Games pitched; IP = Innings pitched; W = Wins; L = Losses; ERA = Earned run average; SO = Strikeouts

Player	G	IP	W	L	ERA	SO
Bob Smith	40	260.2	10	18	3.76	81
Kent Greenfield	27	190.0	11	14	3.84	59
Charlie Robertson	28	154.1	7	17	4.72	49
Hugh McQuillan	13	78.0	3	5	5.54	17
Larry Benton	11	60.1	4	2	4.48	25

==== Other pitchers ====
Note: G = Games pitched; IP = Innings pitched; W = Wins; L = Losses; ERA = Earned run average; SO = Strikeouts

Player	G	IP	W	L	ERA	SO
Joe Genewich	40	181.0	11	8	3.83	38
Johnny Werts	42	164.1	4	10	4.55	39
Foster Edwards	29	92.0	2	8	4.99	37
Hal Goldsmith	22	71.2	1	3	3.52	13
Guy Morrison	11	34.1	1	2	4.46	6

==== Relief pitchers ====
Note: G = Games pitched; W = Wins; L = Losses; SV = Saves; ERA = Earned run average; SO = Strikeouts

Player	G	W	L	SV	ERA	SO
George Mogridge	20	6	4	5	3.70	26
Art Mills	15	0	1	0	3.82	7
Bunny Hearn	8	0	2	0	4.26	5
Jack Knight	3	0	0	0	15.00	0
Dick Rudolph	1	0	0	0	0.00	0
