= 1927 Philadelphia Phillies season =

Major League Baseball season

1927 Philadelphia Phillies
- League: National League
- Ballpark: Baker Bowl
- City: Philadelphia
- Owners: William F. Baker
- Managers: Stuffy McInnis

The following lists the events of the 1927 Philadelphia Phillies season.

== Regular season ==
=== Season standings ===
National League
Team	W	L	Pct.	GB	Home	Road
Pittsburgh Pirates	94	60	.610	—	48‍–‍31	46‍–‍29
St. Louis Cardinals	92	61	.601	1½	55‍–‍25	37‍–‍36
New York Giants	92	62	.597	2	49‍–‍25	43‍–‍37
Chicago Cubs	85	68	.556	8½	50‍–‍28	35‍–‍40
Cincinnati Reds	75	78	.490	18½	45‍–‍35	30‍–‍43
Brooklyn Robins	65	88	.425	28½	34‍–‍39	31‍–‍49
Boston Braves	60	94	.390	34	32‍–‍41	28‍–‍53
Philadelphia Phillies	51	103	.331	43	34‍–‍43	17‍–‍60

=== Record vs. opponents ===
1927 National League record Sources:
Team	BSN	BRO	CHC	CIN	NYG	PHI	PIT	STL
Boston	—	12–10	7–15	4–18	7–15	14–8	9–13–1	7–15
Brooklyn	10–12	—	7–15	11–10	10–12–1	11–11	8–14	8–14
Chicago	15–7	15–7	—	14–8	10–12	13–9	9–13	9–12
Cincinnati	18–4	10–11	8–14	—	7–15	16–6	8–14	8–14
New York	15–7	12–10–1	12–10	15–7	—	15–7	11–11	12–10
Philadelphia	8–14	11–11	9–13	6–16	7–15	—	7–15–1	3–19
Pittsburgh	13–9–1	14–8	13–9	14–8	11–11	15–7–1	—	14–8
St. Louis	15–7	14–8	12–9	14–8	10–12	19–3	8–14	—

=== Roster ===
1927 Philadelphia Phillies
Roster
Pitchers: Ed Baecht; Hal Carlson; Wayland Dean; Art Decatur; Alex Ferguson; Tony Kaufmann; Russ Miller; Clarence Mitchell; Skinny O'Neal; Hub Pruett; Jack Scott; Les Sweetland; Lefty Taber; Dutch Ulrich; Augie Walsh; Claude Willoughby	Catchers: Bubber Jonnard; Harry O'Donnell; Jimmie Wilson; Infielders: Dick Attreau; Henry Baldwin; Jimmy Cooney; Bill Deitrick; Bernie Friberg; Stuffy McInnis; Heinie Sand; Fresco Thompson; Russ Wrightstone	Outfielders: Bill Hohman; Freddy Leach; Johnny Mokan; Al Nixon; Dick Spalding; Cy Williams	Manager: Stuffy McInnis; Coaches: Dan Murphy; Joe Sugden

== Player stats ==
=== Batting ===
==== Starters by position ====
Note: Pos = Position; G = Games played; AB = At bats; H = Hits; Avg. = Batting average; HR = Home runs; RBI = Runs batted in

Pos	Player	G	AB	H	Avg.	HR	RBI
C	Jimmie Wilson	128	443	122	.275	2	45
1B	Russ Wrightstone	141	533	163	.306	6	75
2B	Fresco Thompson	153	597	181	.303	1	70
SS	Heinie Sand	141	535	160	.299	1	49
3B	Bernie Friberg	111	335	78	.233	1	28
OF	Freddy Leach	140	536	164	.306	12	83
OF	Dick Spalding	115	442	131	.296	0	25
OF	Cy Williams	131	492	135	.274	30	98

==== Other batters ====
Note: G = Games played; AB = At bats; H = Hits; Avg. = Batting average; HR = Home runs; RBI = Runs batted in

Player	G	AB	H	Avg.	HR	RBI
Jimmy Cooney	76	259	70	.270	0	15
Johnny Mokan	74	213	61	.286	0	33
Al Nixon	54	154	48	.312	0	18
Bubber Jonnard	53	143	42	.294	0	14
Dick Attreau	44	83	17	.205	1	11
Bill Hohman	7	18	5	.278	0	0
Harry O'Donnell	16	16	1	.063	0	2
Henry Baldwin	6	16	5	.313	0	1
Bill Deitrick	5	6	1	.167	0	0
Stuffy McInnis	1	0	0	----	0	0

=== Pitching ===
==== Starting pitchers ====
Note: G = Games pitched; IP = Innings pitched; W = Wins; L = Losses; ERA = Earned run average; SO = Strikeouts

Player	G	IP	W	L	ERA	SO
Alex Ferguson	31	227.0	8	16	4.84	73
Hub Pruett	31	186.0	7	17	6.05	90
Clarence Mitchell	13	94.2	6	3	4.09	17
Hal Carlson	11	63.2	4	5	5.23	13
Tony Kaufmann	5	18.2	0	3	10.61	4
Russ Miller	2	15.1	1	1	5.28	4
Augie Walsh	1	10.0	0	1	4.50	0
Ed Baecht	1	6.0	0	1	12.00	0

==== Other pitchers ====
Note: G = Games pitched; IP = Innings pitched; W = Wins; L = Losses; ERA = Earned run average; SO = Strikeouts

Player	G	IP	W	L	ERA	SO
Jack Scott	48	233.1	9	21	5.09	69
Dutch Ulrich	32	193.1	8	11	3.17	42
Les Sweetland	21	103.2	2	10	6.16	21
Lefty Taber	3	3.1	0	1	18.90	0

==== Relief pitchers ====
Note: G = Games pitched; W = Wins; L = Losses; SV = Saves; ERA = Earned run average; SO = Strikeouts

Player	G	W	L	SV	ERA	SO
Claude Willoughby	35	3	7	2	6.54	14
Art Decatur	29	3	5	0	7.42	27
Skinny O'Neal	2	0	0	0	9.00	2
Wayland Dean	2	0	1	0	12.00	1
