= 1927 St. Louis Cardinals season =

Major League Baseball season

1927 St. Louis Cardinals
- League: National League
- Ballpark: Sportsman's Park
- City: St. Louis, Missouri
- Record: 92–61 (.601)
- League place: 2nd
- Owners: Sam Breadon
- General managers: Branch Rickey
- Managers: Bob O'Farrell
- Radio: KMOX (Garnett Marks); KFVE (Thomas Patrick); WIL (William Elsworth)

The 1927 St. Louis Cardinals season was the team's 46th season in St. Louis, Missouri, and its 36th season in the National League. The Cardinals went 92–61 during the season and finished second in the National League.

== Offseason ==
- December 20, 1926: Rogers Hornsby was traded by the Cardinals to the New York Giants for Frankie Frisch and Jimmy Ring.

In a deal that shocked the baseball world, the Cardinals traded long-time star Rogers Hornsby on December 20, 1926, to the New York Giants for Frankie Frisch and Jimmy Ring. The deal was held up because Hornsby, as part of his contract as the manager of the Cardinals (he was a player-manager at the time), owned several shares of stock in the Cardinals. Cardinals owner Sam Breadon offered Hornsby a sum for the stock considerably lower than what Hornsby demanded for it, and neither would budge. Eventually, the other owners of the National League made up the difference, and the trade went through.

== Regular season ==
=== Season standings ===
National League
Team	W	L	Pct.	GB	Home	Road
Pittsburgh Pirates	94	60	.610	—	48‍–‍31	46‍–‍29
St. Louis Cardinals	92	61	.601	1½	55‍–‍25	37‍–‍36
New York Giants	92	62	.597	2	49‍–‍25	43‍–‍37
Chicago Cubs	85	68	.556	8½	50‍–‍28	35‍–‍40
Cincinnati Reds	75	78	.490	18½	45‍–‍35	30‍–‍43
Brooklyn Robins	65	88	.425	28½	34‍–‍39	31‍–‍49
Boston Braves	60	94	.390	34	32‍–‍41	28‍–‍53
Philadelphia Phillies	51	103	.331	43	34‍–‍43	17‍–‍60

=== Record vs. opponents ===
1927 National League record Sources:
Team	BSN	BRO	CHC	CIN	NYG	PHI	PIT	STL
Boston	—	12–10	7–15	4–18	7–15	14–8	9–13–1	7–15
Brooklyn	10–12	—	7–15	11–10	10–12–1	11–11	8–14	8–14
Chicago	15–7	15–7	—	14–8	10–12	13–9	9–13	9–12
Cincinnati	18–4	10–11	8–14	—	7–15	16–6	8–14	8–14
New York	15–7	12–10–1	12–10	15–7	—	15–7	11–11	12–10
Philadelphia	8–14	11–11	9–13	6–16	7–15	—	7–15–1	3–19
Pittsburgh	13–9–1	14–8	13–9	14–8	11–11	15–7–1	—	14–8
St. Louis	15–7	14–8	12–9	14–8	10–12	19–3	8–14	—

=== Roster ===
1927 St. Louis Cardinals
Roster
Pitchers: Pete Alexander; Hi Bell; Eddie Dyer; Fred Frankhouse; Jesse Haines; Syl Johnson; Tony Kaufmann; Vic Keen; Carlisle Littlejohn; Bob McGraw; Art Reinhart; Flint Rhem; Jimmy Ring; Bill Sherdel	Catchers: Bob O'Farrell; Bobby Schang; Johnny Schulte; Frank Snyder; Infielders: Les Bell; Jim Bottomley; Frankie Frisch; Rabbit Maranville; Heinie Schuble; Tommy Thevenow; Specs Toporcer	Outfielders: Ray Blades; Danny Clark; Taylor Douthit; Chick Hafey; Wattie Holm; Ernie Orsatti; Homer Peel; Wally Roettger; Billy Southworth	Manager: Bob O'Farrell; Coaches: Allen Sothoron

== Player stats ==
=== Batting ===
==== Starters by position ====
Note: Pos = Position; G = Games played; AB = At bats; H = Hits; Avg. = Batting average; HR = Home runs; RBI = Runs batted in

Pos	Player	G	AB	H	Avg.	HR	RBI
C	Frank Snyder	63	194	50	.258	1	30
1B	Jim Bottomley	152	574	174	.303	19	124
2B	Frankie Frisch	153	617	208	.337	10	78
SS	Heinie Schuble	65	218	56	.257	4	28
3B	Les Bell	115	390	101	.259	9	65
OF	Chick Hafey	103	346	114	.329	18	63
OF	Taylor Douthit	130	488	128	.262	5	50
OF	Wattie Holm	110	419	120	.286	3	66

==== Other batters ====
Note: G = Games played; AB = At bats; H = Hits; Avg. = Batting average; HR = Home runs; RBI = Runs batted in

Player	G	AB	H	Avg.	HR	RBI
Billy Southworth	92	306	92	.301	2	39
Specs Toporcer	86	290	72	.248	0	19
Tommy Thevenow	59	191	37	.194	0	4
Ray Blades	61	180	57	.317	2	29
Bob O'Farrell	61	178	47	.264	0	18
Johnny Schulte	64	156	45	.288	9	32
Ernie Orsatti	27	92	29	.315	0	12
Danny Clark	58	72	17	.236	0	13
Rabbit Maranville	9	29	7	.241	0	0
Bobby Schang	3	5	1	.200	0	0
Homer Peel	2	2	0	.000	0	0
Wally Roettger	5	1	0	.000	0	0

=== Pitching ===
==== Starting pitchers ====
Note: G = Games pitched; IP = Innings pitched; W = Wins; L = Losses; ERA = Earned run average; SO = Strikeouts

Player	G	IP	W	L	ERA	SO
Jesse Haines	38	300.2	24	10	2.72	89
Pete Alexander	37	268.0	21	10	2.52	48
Bill Sherdel	39	232.1	17	12	3.53	59
Flint Rhem	27	169.1	10	12	4.41	51
Bob McGraw	18	94.0	4	5	5.07	37
Fred Frankhouse	6	50.0	5	1	2.70	20

==== Other pitchers ====
Note: G = Games pitched; IP = Innings pitched; W = Wins; L = Losses; ERA = Earned run average; SO = Strikeouts

Player	G	IP	W	L	ERA	SO
Art Reinhart	21	81.2	5	2	4.19	15
Jimmy Ring	13	33.0	0	4	6.55	13

==== Relief pitchers ====
Note: G = Games pitched; W = Wins; L = Losses; SV = Saves; ERA = Earned run average; SO = Strikeouts

Player	G	W	L	SV	ERA	SO
Hi Bell	25	1	3	0	3.92	31
Vic Keen	21	2	1	0	4.81	12
Carlisle Littlejohn	14	3	1	0	4.50	16
Syl Johnson	2	0	0	0	6.00	2
Eddie Dyer	1	0	0	0	18.00	1
Tony Kaufmann	1	0	0	0	81.00	0

== Awards and honors ==
=== Records ===
- Frankie Frisch, National League record, Most chances accepted by a second baseman, (1037).
- Frankie Frisch, National League record, Most assists by a second baseman, (641).

== Farm system ==
Level	Team	League	Manager
AA	Syracuse Stars	International League	Burt Shotton
A	Houston Buffaloes	Texas League	Joe Mathes
B	Danville Veterans	Illinois–Indiana–Iowa League	Everitt Booe
C	Topeka Jayhawks	Western Association	Joe Schultz, Sr.
