= 1927 Chicago Cubs season =

1927 Chicago Cubs
- League: National League
- Ballpark: Wrigley Field
- City: Chicago
- Record: 85–68 (.556)
- League place: 4th
- Owners: William Wrigley Jr.
- Managers: Joe McCarthy
- Radio: WGN (Quin Ryan); WMAQ (Hal Totten)

The 1927 Chicago Cubs season was the 56th season of the Chicago Cubs franchise, the 52nd in the National League and the 12th at Wrigley Field (the first in which the park was officially named Wrigley Field). The Cubs finished fourth in the National League with a record of 85–68.

== Regular season ==
- May 30, 1927: Jimmy Cooney of the Cubs executed an unassisted triple play. He caught a line drive, touched second base and tagged the runner coming from first base.

=== Season standings ===
National League
Team	W	L	Pct.	GB	Home	Road
Pittsburgh Pirates	94	60	.610	—	48‍–‍31	46‍–‍29
St. Louis Cardinals	92	61	.601	1½	55‍–‍25	37‍–‍36
New York Giants	92	62	.597	2	49‍–‍25	43‍–‍37
Chicago Cubs	85	68	.556	8½	50‍–‍28	35‍–‍40
Cincinnati Reds	75	78	.490	18½	45‍–‍35	30‍–‍43
Brooklyn Robins	65	88	.425	28½	34‍–‍39	31‍–‍49
Boston Braves	60	94	.390	34	32‍–‍41	28‍–‍53
Philadelphia Phillies	51	103	.331	43	34‍–‍43	17‍–‍60

=== Record vs. opponents ===
1927 National League record Sources:
Team	BSN	BRO	CHC	CIN	NYG	PHI	PIT	STL
Boston	—	12–10	7–15	4–18	7–15	14–8	9–13–1	7–15
Brooklyn	10–12	—	7–15	11–10	10–12–1	11–11	8–14	8–14
Chicago	15–7	15–7	—	14–8	10–12	13–9	9–13	9–12
Cincinnati	18–4	10–11	8–14	—	7–15	16–6	8–14	8–14
New York	15–7	12–10–1	12–10	15–7	—	15–7	11–11	12–10
Philadelphia	8–14	11–11	9–13	6–16	7–15	—	7–15–1	3–19
Pittsburgh	13–9–1	14–8	13–9	14–8	11–11	15–7–1	—	14–8
St. Louis	15–7	14–8	12–9	14–8	10–12	19–3	8–14	—

=== Roster ===
1927 Chicago Cubs
Roster
Pitchers: Sheriff Blake; Jim Brillheart; Guy Bush; Hal Carlson; Wayland Dean; Hank Grampp; Percy Jones; Tony Kaufmann; Art Nehf; Bob Osborn; Charlie Root; Luther Roy; Lefty Weinert; Johnny Welch	Catchers: John Churry; Mike González; Gabby Hartnett; Infielders: Sparky Adams; Clyde Beck; Jimmy Cooney; Woody English; Howard Freigau; Charlie Grimm; Eddie Pick; Chick Tolson; Harry Wilke; Elmer Yoter	Outfielders: Cliff Heathcote; Pete Scott; Riggs Stephenson; Earl Webb; Hack Wilson; Other batters: Fred Haney; Tommy Sewell	Manager: Joe McCarthy; Coaches: Jimmy Burke; Mickey Doolan

== Player stats ==
=== Batting ===
==== Starters by position ====
Note: Pos = Position; G = Games played; AB = At bats; H = Hits; Avg. = Batting average; HR = Home runs; RBI = Runs batted in

Pos	Player	G	AB	H	Avg.	HR	RBI
C	Gabby Hartnett	127	449	132	.294	10	80
1B	Charlie Grimm	147	543	169	.311	2	74
2B	Clyde Beck	117	391	101	.258	2	44
SS	Woody English	87	334	97	.290	1	28
3B	Sparky Adams	146	647	189	.292	0	49
OF	Riggs Stephenson	152	579	199	.344	7	82
OF	Hack Wilson	146	551	175	.318	30	129
OF	Earl Webb	102	332	100	.301	14	52

==== Other batters ====
Note: G = Games played; AB = At bats; H = Hits; Avg. = Batting average; HR = Home runs; RBI = Runs batted in

Player	G	AB	H	Avg.	HR	RBI
Cliff Heathcote	83	228	67	.294	2	25
Eddie Pick	54	181	31	.171	2	15
Pete Scott	71	156	49	.314	0	21
Jimmy Cooney	33	132	32	.242	0	6
Mike González	39	108	26	.241	1	15
Howard Freigau	30	86	20	.233	0	10
Chick Tolson	39	54	16	.296	2	17
Elmer Yoter	13	27	6	.222	0	5
Harry Wilke	3	9	0	.000	0	0
Fred Haney	4	3	0	.000	0	0
Tommy Sewell	1	1	0	.000	0	0
John Churry	1	1	1	1.000	0	0

=== Pitching ===
==== Starting pitchers ====
Note: G = Games pitched; IP = Innings pitched; W = Wins; L = Losses; ERA = Earned run average; SO = Strikeouts

Player	G	IP	W	L	ERA	SO
Charlie Root	48	309.0	26	15	3.76	145
Sheriff Blake	32	224.0	13	14	3.29	64
Hal Carlson	27	184.1	12	8	3.17	27

==== Other pitchers ====
Note: G = Games pitched; IP = Innings pitched; W = Wins; L = Losses; ERA = Earned run average; SO = Strikeouts

Player	G	IP	W	L	ERA	SO
Guy Bush	36	193.1	10	10	3.03	62
Jim Brillheart	32	128.2	4	2	4.13	36
Percy Jones	30	112.2	7	8	4.07	37
Bob Osborn	24	107.2	5	5	4.18	45
Tony Kaufmann	9	53.1	3	3	6.41	21
Art Nehf	8	26.1	1	1	1.37	12
Lefty Weinert	5	19.2	1	1	4.58	5

==== Relief pitchers ====
Note: G = Games pitched; W = Wins; L = Losses; SV = Saves; ERA = Earned run average; SO = Strikeouts

Player	G	W	L	SV	ERA	SO
Luther Roy	11	3	1	0	2.29	5
Hank Grampp	2	0	0	0	9.00	3
Wayland Dean	2	0	0	0	0.00	2
Johnny Welch	1	0	0	0	9.00	1

== Farm system ==
Level	Team	League	Manager
AA	Reading Keystones	International League	Fred Merkle, Fritz Maisel and Harry Hinchman
AA	Los Angeles Angels	Pacific Coast League	Marty Krug
