= Bob O'Farrell =

American baseball player and manager (1896–1988)

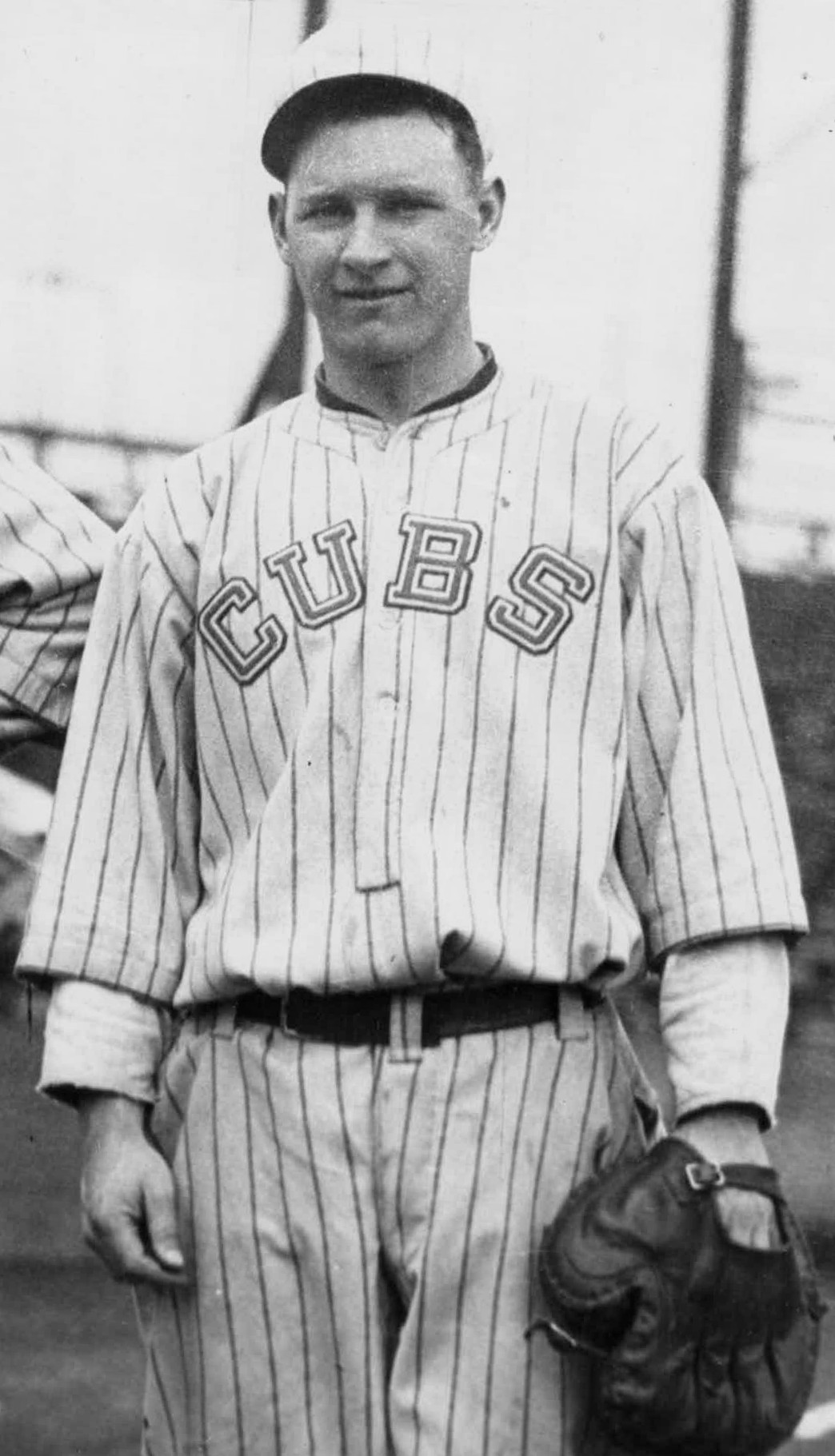
- Catcher / Manager
- Born: October 19, 1896; Waukegan, Illinois, U.S.
- Died: February 20, 1988 (aged 91); Waukegan, Illinois, U.S.
- Batted: Right Threw: Right

MLB debut
- September 5, 1915, for the Chicago Cubs

Last MLB appearance
- September 23, 1935, for the St. Louis Cardinals

MLB statistics
- Batting average: .273
- Home runs: 51
- Runs batted in: 549
- Managerial record: 122–121
- Winning %: .502
- Stats at Baseball Reference

Teams
- As player: Chicago Cubs (1915–1925); St. Louis Cardinals (1925–1928); New York Giants (1928–1932); St. Louis Cardinals (1933); Cincinnati Reds (1934); Chicago Cubs (1934); St. Louis Cardinals (1935); As manager: St. Louis Cardinals (1927); Cincinnati Reds (1934)

Career highlights and awards
- World Series champion (1926); NL MVP (1926)

Robert Arthur O'Farrell (October 19, 1896 – February 20, 1988) was an American professional baseball player and manager. He played in Major League Baseball as a catcher for 21 seasons with the Chicago Cubs, St. Louis Cardinals and the New York Giants. O'Farrell also played for the Cincinnati Reds, albeit briefly. He was considered one of the greatest defensive catchers of his generation.

== Baseball career ==
O'Farrell was born in Waukegan, Illinois where he grew up a Chicago White Sox fan. He signed with the Cubs in 1915 after playing an exhibition game for his local semi-professional team. His first manager was former catcher Roger Bresnahan who helped O'Farrell develop his catching skills. After a season on the bench, O'Farrell was sent to Three-I League where he spent two years before returning to the Cubs for the 1918 season. He served as backup catcher working behind Bill Killefer as the Cubs went on to claim the 1918 National League (NL) pennant before losing to the Boston Red Sox in the 1918 World Series. O'Farrell went hitless in three at bats during the series.

In 1920, O'Farrell caught most of the Cubs' games, posting a .248 batting average as Killefer was injured during the season. He began the 1921 season as backup catcher until August, when Killefer was named the Cubs new manager.

O'Farrell had a breakout season in 1922 when he hit for a .322 average along with 4 home runs, 60 runs batted in (RBI), and a .439 on-base percentage. He became one of the best defensive catchers in baseball, leading National League (NL) catchers in games caught, putouts, assists, baserunners caught stealing, and caught stealing percentage. He became skillful at framing pitches by moving his catcher's mitt towards the strike zone after having caught a pitch, in an effort to influence the umpire to call a strike. He had an even better year offensively in 1923, producing career highs in home runs (12), RBI (80), and stolen bases (10) along with a .319 batting average.

In July 1924, O'Farrell suffered a fractured skull when a foul ball broke his catcher's mask. He had asked a club house attendant to bring him a newer mask. However, not wanting to delay the game, he chose to continue playing the older mask when he was struck in the head.

He missed most of the season and lost his job when future Baseball Hall of Fame member, Gabby Hartnett, played well in his absence. The Cubs kept Hartnett as their starting catcher and traded O'Farrell to the St. Louis Cardinals at the start of the 1925 season for Mike González and Howard Freigau. O'Farrell experienced the highlight of his career in 1926, when he hit for a .293 average with a career-high 30 doubles, 7 home runs, and 68 RBI as he helped the Cardinals clinch the National League pennant. He also led National League catchers in games caught and in putouts.

In the 1926 World Series against the New York Yankees, O'Farrell produced a .301 batting average, but is remembered for throwing out Babe Ruth trying to steal second base for the last out of the seven-game series as the Cardinals claimed their first-ever world championship.

In November, he was voted the winner of the NL Most Valuable Player Award with 79 out of the possible 80 votes. He was the first catcher to win a Most Valuable Player Award.

In December 1926, the Cardinals traded manager Rogers Hornsby to the New York Giants for Frankie Frisch and Jimmy Ring, and O'Farrell was named player-manager. He led the Cardinals to a second-place finish, behind the Pittsburgh Pirates even though the Cardinals won three more games than the previous season. He only played in 61 games that season because of a sore arm.

Cardinals owner Sam Breadon was unhappy that the Cardinals did not win the pennant and that O'Farrell was leaving his pitchers in too long during games. O'Farrell was given a $5,000 bonus (equivalent to $93,000 in 2025) to step down and was replaced by Bill McKechnie. O'Farrell was traded to the New York Giants for George Harper in May 1928. The trade caught many observers by surprise, as it left the Cardinals without an experienced catcher while the Giants had a surplus of catchers.

O'Farrell played as a part-time catcher for the Giants, sharing duties with Shanty Hogan during John McGraw's final four years as manager of the club. He hit for a .306 batting average in 1929 and followed that with a .301 average in 1930. By the 1931 season, the 34-year-old O'Farrell was past his prime as his batting average dipped to .224.

In October 1932, O'Farrell was traded back to the Cardinals for catcher Gus Mancuso as part of new Giants manager Bill Terry's rebuilding campaign. He spent one season serving as backup catcher to Jimmie Wilson before being traded to the Cincinnati Reds in January 1934.

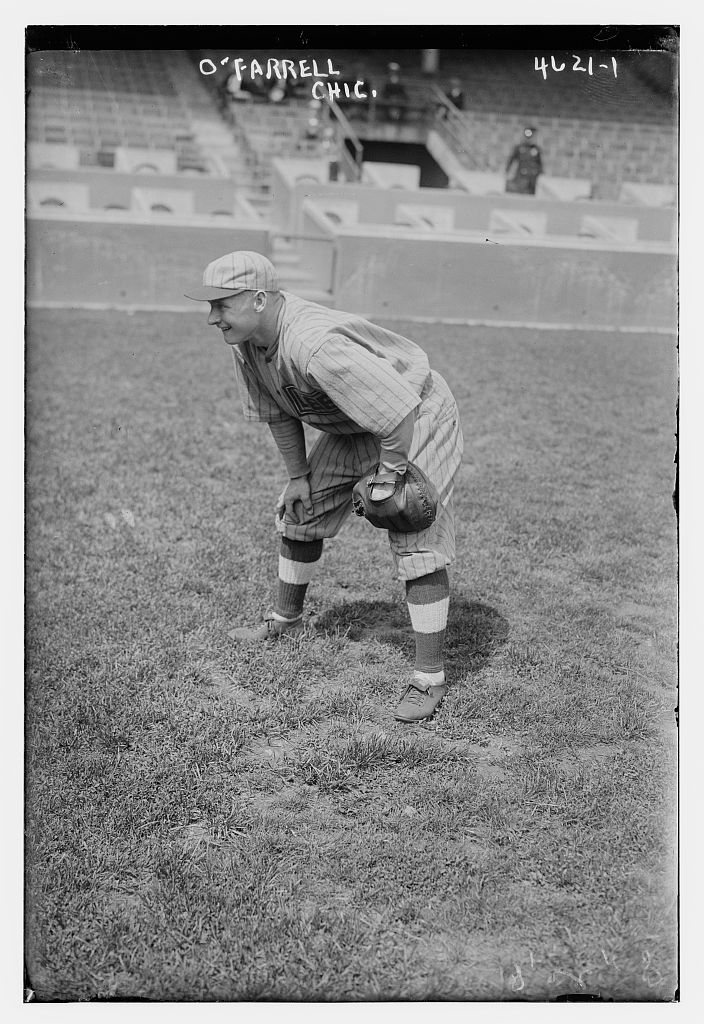
O'Farrell during the 1918 season

Reds general manager Larry MacPhail named O'Farrell as the team's player-manager. By July, the Reds had fallen to last place in the NL standings. On July 27, O'Farrell requested his unconditional release from the team.

It was later reported that after the Reds had lost nine consecutive games, O'Farrell was engaged in a conversation with MacPhail when he quipped, "Well, you can't win 'em all." A supposedly infuriated MacPhail hired Charlie Dressen as the new Reds manager the following day. In August, O'Farrell returned to the Cubs where he worked as a backup catcher to Hartnett. O'Farrell was released by the Cubs at the end of the year and signed to play with the Cardinals for the 1935 season. He appeared in only 14 games for the Cardinals, playing his final major league game on September 23 at the age of 38, and was released by the Cardinals in December 1935. O'Farrell played two more seasons in the minor leagues with the Rochester Red Wings. In 1938 he managed the Bloomington Bloomers before retiring from professional baseball at the age of 41.

== Career statistics ==
In a 21-year major league career, O'Farrell played in 1,492 games, accumulating 1,120 hits in 4,101 at bats for a .273 career batting average along with 51 home runs, 549 runs batted in and a .360 on-base percentage. He finished his career with a .976 fielding percentage. He led the National League three times in putouts and twice in assists.

While with the Giants, O'Farrell caught Carl Hubbell's no-hitter on May 8, 1929. He caught for six pitchers who would eventually be inducted into the Baseball Hall of Fame.

After retirement he ran a bowling alley in Waukegan which was open for over 30 years. O'Farrell died in Waukegan at the age of 91.

== See also ==
- List of Major League Baseball player–managers
