= 1927 Pittsburgh Pirates season =

Major League Baseball season

1927 Pittsburgh Pirates
- National League champions
- League: National League
- Ballpark: Forbes Field
- City: Pittsburgh, Pennsylvania
- Owners: Barney Dreyfuss
- Managers: Donie Bush

The 1927 Pittsburgh Pirates season was a season in American baseball. That year, the Pirates won the National League pennant, which was their second in three years and their last until 1960. The team included five future Hall of Famers: Paul Waner, Lloyd Waner, Pie Traynor, Kiki Cuyler, and 20-year-old rookie Joe Cronin (who played just 12 games).

In the World Series, however, Pittsburgh was no match for the New York Yankees. They were swept in four games.

== Regular season ==
Paul Waner had one of his best seasons en route to being voted NL MVP. His .380 batting average and 131 RBI paced the entire circuit. Younger brother Lloyd and Traynor finished third and fifth in the batting race, respectively. Pitcher Ray Kremer won the ERA title with a 2.47 ERA on his way to a 19–8 record.

=== Season standings ===
National League
Team	W	L	Pct.	GB	Home	Road
Pittsburgh Pirates	94	60	.610	—	48‍–‍31	46‍–‍29
St. Louis Cardinals	92	61	.601	1½	55‍–‍25	37‍–‍36
New York Giants	92	62	.597	2	49‍–‍25	43‍–‍37
Chicago Cubs	85	68	.556	8½	50‍–‍28	35‍–‍40
Cincinnati Reds	75	78	.490	18½	45‍–‍35	30‍–‍43
Brooklyn Robins	65	88	.425	28½	34‍–‍39	31‍–‍49
Boston Braves	60	94	.390	34	32‍–‍41	28‍–‍53
Philadelphia Phillies	51	103	.331	43	34‍–‍43	17‍–‍60

=== Record vs. opponents ===
1927 National League record Sources:
Team	BSN	BRO	CHC	CIN	NYG	PHI	PIT	STL
Boston	—	12–10	7–15	4–18	7–15	14–8	9–13–1	7–15
Brooklyn	10–12	—	7–15	11–10	10–12–1	11–11	8–14	8–14
Chicago	15–7	15–7	—	14–8	10–12	13–9	9–13	9–12
Cincinnati	18–4	10–11	8–14	—	7–15	16–6	8–14	8–14
New York	15–7	12–10–1	12–10	15–7	—	15–7	11–11	12–10
Philadelphia	8–14	11–11	9–13	6–16	7–15	—	7–15–1	3–19
Pittsburgh	13–9–1	14–8	13–9	14–8	11–11	15–7–1	—	14–8
St. Louis	15–7	14–8	12–9	14–8	10–12	19–3	8–14	—

=== Game log ===
1927 Game Log: 94–60 (Home: 48–31; Away: 46–29)
April: 8–6 (Home: 2–3; Away: 6–3)

#	Date	Opponent	Score	Win	Loss	Save	Attendance	Record
1	April 12	@ Reds	2–1	**Kremer** (1–0)	Donohue	—	37,758	1–0
2	April 14	@ Reds	6–2	**Meadows** (1–0)	Mays	—	4,000	2–0
3	April 15	@ Reds	10–6	**Mahaffey** (1–0)	Rixey	**Morrison** (1)	—	3–0
4	April 16	@ Cubs	2–5	Bush	**Hill** (0–1)	—	13,000	3–1
5	April 17	@ Cubs	8–3	**Kremer** (2–0)	Root	**Morrison** (2)	45,000	4–1
6	April 18	@ Cubs	9–1	**Meadows** (2–0)	Kaufmann	—	—	5–1
7	April 21	Reds	3–2	**Kremer** (3–0)	Rixey	—	33,439	6–1
8	April 22	Reds	3–1	**Meadows** (3–0)	Luque	—	4,000	7–1
9	April 23	Reds	4–6	Donohue	**Hill** (0–2)	—	15,000	7–2
10	April 24	@ Cardinals	1–2	Alexander	**Aldridge** (0–1)	—	—	7–3
11	April 25	@ Cardinals	0–1	Haines	**Kremer** (3–1)	—	—	7–4
12	April 26	@ Cardinals	9–5	**Meadows** (4–0)	Sherdel	—	—	8–4
13	April 28	Cubs	4–16	Root	**Bush** (0–1)	—	—	8–5
14	April 30	Cubs	4–5	Roy	**Morrison** (0–1)	—	—	8–6

May: 18–6 (Home: 6–3; Away: 12–3)

#	Date	Opponent	Score	Win	Loss	Save	Attendance	Record
15	May 1	@ Cubs	7–6	**Kremer** (4–1)	Root	**Morrison** (3)	37,000	9–6
16	May 3	Cardinals	11–10	**Kremer** (5–1)	Bell	—	3,000	10–6
17	May 4	Cardinals	3–8	Haines	**Cvengros** (0–1)	—	5,500	10–7
18	May 5	Cardinals	2–4	Alexander	**Aldridge** (0–2)	—	5,000	10–8
19	May 7	@ Phillies	5–6	Pruett	**Kremer** (5–2)	—	18,000	10–9
20	May 11	@ Braves	4–4 (8)			—	—	10–9
21	May 12	@ Braves	8–7	**Morrison** (1–1)	Mogridge	—	—	11–9
22	May 14	@ Robins	6–1	**Kremer** (6–2)	Elliott	—	—	12–9
23	May 15	@ Robins	9–6	**Morrison** (2–1)	Ehrhardt	—	22,000	13–9
24	May 16	@ Robins	5–9	Petty	**Yde** (0–1)	—	—	13–10
25	May 17	@ Robins	1–2	Vance	**Hill** (0–3)	—	—	13–11
26	May 18	@ Giants	13–6	**Aldridge** (1–2)	Henry	—	—	14–11
27	May 20	@ Giants	8–3 (12)	**Meadows** (5–0)	Greenfield	—	15,000	15–11
28	May 21	@ Giants	6–3	**Hill** (1–3)	McQuillan	—	25,000	16–11
29	May 22	@ Giants	9–4	**Aldridge** (2–2)	Grimes	—	40,000	17–11
30	May 23	@ Reds	8–5	**Morrison** (3–1)	May	—	—	18–11
31	May 24	@ Reds	11–1	**Meadows** (6–0)	Donohue	—	2,500	19–11
32	May 25	@ Reds	2–0	**Hill** (2–3)	Mays	—	—	20–11
33	May 26	Cardinals	2–1	**Aldridge** (3–2)	Haines	—	5,000	21–11
34	May 27	Cardinals	8–7 (10)	**Bush** (1–1)	McGraw	—	6,000	22–11
35	May 28	Cardinals	6–4	**Meadows** (7–0)	Ring	—	18,000	23–11
36	May 29	@ Cubs	8–5	**Hill** (3–3)	Osborn	—	30,000	24–11
37	May 30	Cubs	6–7 (10)	Kaufmann	**Nichols** (0–1)	—	25,000	24–12
38	May 30	Cubs	6–5 (10)	**Aldridge** (4–2)	Blake	—	40,000	25–12
39	May 31	Cubs	10–9	**Hill** (4–3)	Osborn	—	—	26–12

June: 13–12 (Home: 10–8; Away: 3–4)

#	Date	Opponent	Score	Win	Loss	Save	Attendance	Record
40	June 1	Phillies	4–7	Pruett	**Meadows** (7–1)	Carlson	—	26–13
41	June 2	Phillies	7–3	**Hill** (5–3)	Ferguson	—	—	27–13
42	June 3	Phillies	11–1	**Aldridge** (5–2)	Ulrich	—	—	28–13
43	June 6	Phillies	7–5	**Hill** (6–3)	Scott	—	—	29–13
44	June 7	Giants	9–6	**Meadows** (8–1)	Grimes	—	15,000	30–13
45	June 8	Giants	7–8	Greenfield	**Aldridge** (5–3)	Clarkson	15,000	30–14
46	June 9	Giants	1–12	Fitzsimmons	**Bush** (1–2)	—	—	30–15
47	June 10	Giants	13–4	**Hill** (7–3)	Clarkson	—	—	31–15
48	June 11	Robins	10–11	Petty	**Nichols** (0–2)	Vance	—	31–16
49	June 12	@ Robins	10–11	Plitt	**Nichols** (0–3)	—	20,000	31–17
50	June 13	Robins	4–3	**Kremer** (7–2)	Barnes	**Hill** (1)	—	32–17
51	June 15	Braves	7–4	**Hill** (8–3)	Robertson	—	—	33–17
52	June 16	Braves	6–0	**Meadows** (9–1)	Greenfield	—	5,000	34–17
53	June 17	Braves	7–8	Mogridge	**Dawson** (0–1)	Smith	—	34–18
54	June 18	Braves	7–4	**Kremer** (8–2)	Smith	—	—	35–18
55	June 19	@ Cubs	7–14	Root	**Hill** (8–4)	—	—	35–19
56	June 20	@ Cubs	4–0	**Meadows** (10–1)	Carlson	—	25,000	36–19
57	June 21	Reds	6–7 (10)	Mays	**Morrison** (3–2)	—	—	36–20
58	June 22	Reds	11–9	**Hill** (9–4)	Lucas	**Aldridge** (1)	—	37–20
59	June 24	Cubs	2–4	Root	**Meadows** (10–2)	—	—	37–21
60	June 25	Cubs	4–6	Carlson	**Aldridge** (5–4)	—	30,000	37–22
61	June 26	@ Cardinals	9–3	**Hill** (10–4)	Haines	—	—	38–22
62	June 27	@ Cardinals	5–7	Rhem	**Dawson** (0–2)	—	3,500	38–23
63	June 28	@ Cardinals	9–8	**Cvengros** (1–1)	Keen	**Hill** (2)	9,000	39–23
64	June 29	@ Cardinals	9–10	Haines	**Kremer** (8–3)	Reinhart	5,000	39–24

July: 18–14 (Home: 9–4; Away: 9–10)

#	Date	Opponent	Score	Win	Loss	Save	Attendance	Record
65	July 1	Reds	5–1	**Hill** (11–4)	Luque	—	—	40–24
66	July 2	Reds	7–6	**Cvengros** (2–1)	Nehf	—	8,000	41–24
67	July 3	@ Reds	4–5	Lucas	**Dawson** (0–3)	—	—	41–25
68	July 4	Cardinals	7–2	**Meadows** (11–2)	Alexander	—	—	42–25
69	July 4	Cardinals	6–4	**Hill** (12–4)	Ring	—	—	43–25
70	July 5	Cardinals	14–2	**Aldridge** (6–4)	Reinhart	—	—	44–25
71	July 7	Cubs	1–2 (8)	Carlson	**Dawson** (0–4)	—	—	44–26
72	July 8	Cubs	0–1	Root	**Meadows** (11–3)	—	—	44–27
73	July 9	Cubs	4–0	**Aldridge** (7–4)	Brillheart	—	23,000	45–27
74	July 12	@ Robins	2–1	**Hill** (13–4)	Vance	—	—	46–27
75	July 13	@ Robins	1–2 (11)	Clark	**Meadows** (11–4)	—	6,000	46–28
76	July 14	@ Robins	6–5	**Aldridge** (8–4)	Barnes	—	—	47–28
77	July 15	@ Robins	5–2	**Dawson** (1–4)	Elliott	—	5,000	48–28
78	July 16	@ Phillies	10–11	Decatur	**Yde** (0–2)	—	—	48–29
79	July 16	@ Phillies	9–11	Scott	**Kremer** (8–4)	—	—	48–30
80	July 18	@ Phillies	9–7	**Yde** (1–2)	Kaufmann	—	—	49–30
81	July 18	@ Phillies	6–5	**Meadows** (12–4)	Ferguson	**Hill** (3)	—	50–30
82	July 20	@ Phillies	3–4	Mitchell	**Dawson** (1–5)	—	—	50–31
83	July 20	@ Phillies	6–5	**Hill** (14–4)	Sweetland	—	—	51–31
84	July 21	@ Braves	1–2	Greenfield	**Kremer** (8–5)	—	—	51–32
85	July 21	@ Braves	2–5	Smith	**Miljus** (0–1)	—	—	51–33
86	July 22	@ Braves	5–2	**Meadows** (13–4)	Edwards	—	—	52–33
87	July 23	@ Braves	2–6	Greenfield	**Yde** (1–3)	—	—	52–34
88	July 23	@ Braves	4–3 (6)	**Aldridge** (9–4)	Wertz	—	—	53–34
89	July 24	@ Giants	11–6	**Hill** (15–4)	Barnes	—	—	54–34
90	July 24	@ Giants	3–9	Grimes	**Dawson** (1–6)	—	50,000	54–35
91	July 25	@ Giants	0–1	Benton	**Kremer** (8–6)	—	—	54–36
92	July 26	Robins	6–5	**Meadows** (14–4)	Elliott	—	—	55–36
93	July 27	Robins	2–1	**Aldridge** (10–4)	Vance	—	—	56–36
94	July 28	Robins	5–7	Doak	**Hill** (15–5)	Clark	—	56–37
95	July 29	Robins	4–3	**Dawson** (2–6)	Plitt	—	—	57–37
96	July 30	Braves	2–3 (10)	Genewich	**Meadows** (14–5)	—	—	57–38

August: 14–12 (Home: 4–5; Away: 10–7)

#	Date	Opponent	Score	Win	Loss	Save	Attendance	Record
97	August 1	Braves	1–4 (11)	Genewich	**Aldridge** (10–5)	—	—	57–39
98	August 2	Braves	2–5	Greenfield	**Hill** (15–6)	—	—	57–40
99	August 3	Phillies	9–6	**Dawson** (3–6)	Mitchell	—	6,500	58–40
100	August 4	Phillies	8–5	**Miljus** (1–1)	Pruett	—	—	59–40
101	August 4	Phillies	7–3	**Kremer** (9–6)	Ulrich	—	—	60–40
102	August 5	Phillies	7–9	Ferguson	**Aldridge** (10–6)	Ulrich	3,500	60–41
103	August 6	Giants	2–9	Fitzsimmons	**Hill** (15–7)	—	—	60–42
104	August 9	Giants	7–6	**Hill** (16–7)	Fitzsimmons	—	—	61–42
105	August 10	Giants	3–8	Benton	**Dawson** (3–7)	Henry	10,000	61–43
106	August 11	@ Cardinals	1–2	Alexander	**Aldridge** (10–7)	—	—	61–44
107	August 12	@ Cardinals	1–2 (11)	Haines	**Hill** (16–8)	—	23,945	61–45
108	August 13	@ Cardinals	6–2	**Meadows** (15–5)	Rhem	—	—	62–45
109	August 14	@ Cardinals	5–1	**Kremer** (10–6)	Sherdel	—	20,000	63–45
110	August 16	@ Giants	4–8	Henry	**Aldridge** (10–8)	—	25,000	63–46
111	August 17	@ Giants	4–1	**Hill** (17–8)	Fitzsimmons	—	—	64–46
112	August 19	@ Giants	9–3	**Meadows** (16–5)	Benton	—	—	65–46
113	August 19	@ Giants	2–5	Grimes	**Kremer** (10–7)	—	30,000	65–47
114	August 20	@ Robins	10–7	**Miljus** (2–1)	Clark	—	7,000	66–47
115	August 21	@ Robins	2–1	**Hill** (18–8)	Doak	—	20,000	67–47
116	August 25	@ Braves	1–5	Greenfield	**Meadows** (16–6)	—	—	67–48
117	August 25	@ Braves	8–1	**Kremer** (11–7)	Smith	—	—	68–48
118	August 26	@ Braves	4–6	Robertson	**Miljus** (2–2)	—	—	68–49
119	August 29	@ Phillies	2–2 (6)			—	—	68–49
120	August 30	@ Phillies	2–3 (10)	Pruett	**Kremer** (11–8)	—	—	68–50
121	August 30	@ Phillies	12–6	**Miljus** (3–2)	Decatur	—	—	69–50
122	August 31	@ Phillies	3–2 (13)	**Hill** (19–8)	Ulrich	—	—	70–50
123	August 31	@ Phillies	7–2	**Miljus** (4–2)	Scott	**Cvengros** (1)	—	71–50

September: 22–9 (Home: 17–8; Away: 5–1)

#	Date	Opponent	Score	Win	Loss	Save	Attendance	Record
124	September 1	Cubs	4–3	**Meadows** (17–6)	Carlson	—	18,000	72–50
125	September 2	Cardinals	5–3	**Kremer** (12–8)	Alexander	—	—	73–50
126	September 3	Cardinals	14–0	**Hill** (20–8)	Haines	—	—	74–50
127	September 4	@ Reds	8–4	**Aldridge** (11–8)	Luque	—	—	75–50
128	September 5	Reds	6–8	Rixey	**Miljus** (4–3)	—	—	75–51
129	September 5	Reds	3–4	Donohue	**Meadows** (17–7)	—	—	75–52
130	September 6	Reds	5–0	**Kremer** (13–8)	May	—	—	76–52
131	September 7	Reds	5–6	Lucas	**Hill** (20–9)	—	—	76–53
132	September 9	Phillies	3–2	**Aldridge** (12–8)	Pruett	—	—	77–53
133	September 10	Phillies	4–0	**Kremer** (14–8)	Ulrich	—	—	78–53
134	September 12	Phillies	3–2	**Hill** (21–9)	Scott	—	—	79–53
135	September 13	Braves	6–1	**Meadows** (18–7)	Greenfield	—	—	80–53
136	September 13	Braves	5–4	**Aldridge** (13–8)	Genewich	**Kremer** (1)	30,000	81–53
137	September 14	Braves	6–2	**Kremer** (15–8)	Greenfield	—	—	82–53
138	September 14	Braves	3–0	**Miljus** (5–3)	Robertson	—	—	83–53
139	September 15	Braves	2–1	**Hill** (22–9)	Smith	—	—	84–53
140	September 16	Braves	4–3	**Meadows** (19–7)	Wertz	—	—	85–53
141	September 17	Robins	2–1	**Aldridge** (14–8)	Petty	—	—	86–53
142	September 17	Robins	6–0	**Kremer** (16–8)	Elliott	—	27,000	87–53
143	September 19	Robins	0–3	Vance	**Hill** (22–10)	—	—	87–54
144	September 20	Robins	0–3	Doak	**Meadows** (19–8)	—	—	87–55
145	September 21	Robins	4–2	**Miljus** (6–3)	McWeeny	—	6,000	88–55
146	September 22	Giants	5–2	**Kremer** (17–8)	Benton	—	—	89–55
147	September 22	Giants	1–7	Fitzsimmons	**Aldridge** (14–9)	—	40,000	89–56
148	September 23	Giants	5–6	Plitt	**Hill** (22–11)	Benton	18,000	89–57
149	September 24	Giants	1–3	Fitzsimmons	**Meadows** (19–9)	—	40,000	89–58
150	September 25	@ Cubs	2–1	**Aldridge** (15–9)	Bush	—	—	90–58
151	September 25	@ Cubs	6–1	**Kremer** (18–8)	Root	—	—	91–58
152	September 26	@ Cubs	1–0 (6)	**Miljus** (7–3)	Nehf	—	5,000	92–58
153	September 27	@ Cubs	2–1	**Kremer** (19–8)	Carlson	—	3,000	93–58
154	September 30	@ Reds	1–2	Lucas	**Aldridge** (15–10)	—	2,011	93–59

October: 1–1 (Home: 0–0; Away: 1–1)

#	Date	Opponent	Score	Win	Loss	Save	Attendance	Record
155	October 1	@ Reds	9–6	**Miljus** (8–3)	Donohue	—	—	94–59
156	October 2	@ Reds	0–1	Appleton	**Meadows** (19–10)	—	—	94–60

Legend: = Win = Loss = Tie
Bold = Pirates team member

=== Detailed records ===
National League
Opponent	W	L	WP	RS	RA
Boston Braves	13	9	0.591	97	80
Brooklyn Robins	14	8	0.636	100	86
Chicago Cubs	13	9	0.591	101	95
Cincinnati Reds	14	8	0.636	119	83
New York Giants	11	11	0.500	123	120
Philadelphia Phillies	15	7	0.682	144	107
**Pittsburgh Pirates**					
St. Louis Cardinals	14	8	0.636	133	88
Total	94	60	0.610	817	659
Season Total	94	60	0.610	817	659

Month	Games	Won	Lost	Win %	RS	RA
April	14	8	6	0.571	65	56
May	24	18	6	0.750	164	123
June	25	13	12	0.520	176	155
July	32	18	14	0.563	152	129
August	26	14	12	0.538	129	114
September	31	22	9	0.710	122	75
October	2	1	1	0.500	9	7
Total	154	94	60	0.610	817	659

	Games	Won	Lost	Win %	RS	RA
Home	79	48	31	0.608	406	345
Away	75	46	29	0.613	405	308
Total	154	94	60	0.610	817	659

=== Notable transactions ===
- May 9, 1927: Don Songer was purchased from the Pirates by the New York Giants.

=== Roster ===
1927 Pittsburgh Pirates
**Roster**
**Pitchers**: Vic Aldridge; Joe Bush; Mike Cvengros; Joe Dawson; Carmen Hill; Ray Kremer; Roy Mahaffey; Lee Meadows; Johnny Miljus; Johnny Morrison; Chet Nichols; Red Peery; Don Songer; Emil Yde	**Catchers**: Johnny Gooch; Earl Smith; Roy Spencer; **Infielders**: Dick Bartell; Joe Cronin; George Grantham; Heinie Groh; Joe Harris; Hal Rhyne; Ed Sicking; Pie Traynor; Glenn Wright	**Outfielders**: Clyde Barnhart; Fred Brickell; Adam Comorosky; Kiki Cuyler; Herman Layne; Lloyd Waner; Paul Waner	**Manager**: Donie Bush

== Player stats ==
=== Batting ===
==== Starters by position ====
Note: Pos = Position; G = Games played; AB = At bats; H = Hits; Avg. = Batting average; HR = Home runs; RBI = Runs batted in

Pos	Player	G	AB	H	Avg.	HR	RBI
C	Johnny Gooch	101	291	75	.258	2	48
1B	Joe Harris	129	411	134	.326	5	73
2B	George Grantham	151	531	162	.305	8	66
SS	Glenn Wright	143	570	160	.281	9	105
3B	Pie Traynor	149	573	196	.342	5	106
OF	Lloyd Waner	150	629	223	.355	2	27
OF	Paul Waner	155	623	237	.380	9	131
OF	Clyde Barnhart	108	360	115	.319	3	54

==== Other batters ====
Note: G = Games played; AB = At bats; H = Hits; Avg. = Batting average; HR = Home runs; RBI = Runs batted in

Player	G	AB	H	Avg.	HR	RBI
Kiki Cuyler	85	285	88	.309	3	31
Earl Smith	66	189	51	.270	5	25
Hal Rhyne	62	168	46	.274	0	17
Roy Spencer	38	92	26	.283	0	13
Adam Comorosky	18	61	14	.230	0	4
Heinie Groh	14	35	10	.286	0	3
Joe Cronin	12	22	5	.227	0	3
Fred Brickell	32	21	6	.286	1	4
Ed Sicking	6	7	1	.143	0	3
Herman Layne	11	6	0	.000	0	0
Dick Bartell	1	2	0	.000	0	0

=== Pitching ===
==== Starting pitchers ====
Note: G = Games pitched; IP = Innings pitched; W = Wins; L = Losses; ERA = Earned run average; SO = Strikeouts

Player	G	IP	W	L	ERA	SO
Lee Meadows	40	299.1	19	10	3.40	84
Carmen Hill	43	277.2	22	11	3.24	95
Vic Aldridge	35	239.1	15	10	4.25	86
Ray Kremer	35	226.0	19	8	2.47	63

==== Other pitchers ====
Note: G = Games pitched; IP = Innings pitched; W = Wins; L = Losses; ERA = Earned run average; SO = Strikeouts

Player	G	IP	W	L	ERA	SO
Joe Dawson	20	80.2	3	7	4.46	17
Johnny Miljus	19	75.2	8	3	1.90	24
Mike Cvengros	23	53.1	2	1	3.35	21
Emil Yde	9	27.2	1	3	9.71	9
Roy Mahaffey	2	9.1	1	0	7.71	4
Joe Bush	5	6.2	1	2	13.50	1

==== Relief pitchers ====
Note: G = Games pitched; W = Wins; L = Losses; SV = Saves; ERA = Earned run average; SO = Strikeouts

Player	G	W	L	SV	ERA	SO
Johnny Morrison	23	3	2	3	4.19	21
Chet Nichols	8	0	3	0	5.86	9
Don Songer	2	0	0	0	11.57	1
Red Peery	1	0	0	0	0.00	0

== Awards and honors ==
=== League top five finishers ===
Carmen Hill

- #3 in NL in wins (22)

Ray Kremer

- NL leader in ERA (2.47)

Lee Meadows

- NL leader in complete games (25)

Pie Traynor

- #5 in NL in batting average (.342)

Lloyd Waner

- NL leader in runs scored (133)
- #3 in NL in batting average (.355)

Paul Waner

- NL leader in batting average (.380)
- NL leader in RBI (131)
- NL leader in triples (18)
- #2 in NL in on-base percentage (.437)
- #2 in NL in doubles (42)
- #4 in NL in runs scored (114)
- #4 in NL in slugging percentage (.549)

== 1927 World Series ==
=== Game 1 ===
October 5, 1927, at Forbes Field in Pittsburgh, Pennsylvania

Team	1	2	3	4	5	6	7	8	9	R	H	E
New York (A)	1	0	3	0	1	0	0	0	0	5	6	1
Pittsburgh (N)	1	0	1	0	1	0	0	1	0	4	9	2
W: Waite Hoyt (1–0) L: Ray Kremer (0–1), S: Wilcy Moore (1)

=== Game 2 ===
October 6, 1927, at Forbes Field in Pittsburgh, Pennsylvania

Team	1	2	3	4	5	6	7	8	9	R	H	E
New York (A)	0	0	3	0	0	0	0	3	0	6	11	0
Pittsburgh (N)	1	0	0	0	0	0	0	1	0	2	7	2
W: George Pipgras (1–0) L: Vic Aldridge (0–1)

=== Game 3 ===
October 7, 1927, at Yankee Stadium in New York City

Team	1	2	3	4	5	6	7	8	9	R	H	E
Pittsburgh (N)	0	0	0	0	0	0	0	1	0	1	3	1
New York (A)	2	0	0	0	0	0	6	0	x	8	9	0
W: Herb Pennock (1–0) L: Lee Meadows (0–1)
HR: NYY – Babe Ruth (1)

=== Game 4 ===
October 8, 1927, at Yankee Stadium in New York City

Team	1	2	3	4	5	6	7	8	9	R	H	E
Pittsburgh (N)	1	0	0	0	0	0	2	0	0	3	10	1
New York (A)	1	0	0	0	2	0	0	0	1	4	12	2
W: Wilcy Moore (1–0) L: John Miljus (0–1)
HR: NYY – Babe Ruth (2)
