= Overton Tremper =

American baseball player (1906-1996)

- Outfielder
- Born: March 22, 1906; Brooklyn, New York, U.S.
- Died: January 9, 1996 (aged 89); Clearwater, Florida, U.S.
- Batted: Right Threw: Right

MLB debut
- June 16, 1927, for the Brooklyn Robins

Last MLB appearance
- September 30, 1928, for the Brooklyn Robins

MLB statistics
- Batting average: .220
- Home runs: 0
- Runs batted in: 5
- Stats at Baseball Reference

Teams
- Brooklyn Robins (1927–1928)

Carlton Overton Tremper (March 22, 1906 – January 9, 1996), was an American professional baseball player who played outfield for the Brooklyn Robins in the 1927 and 1928 seasons. He attended college at the University of Pennsylvania.

After his Major League career, Tremper played for several years for the semi-pro Brooklyn Bushwicks.

Tremper taught, held administrative positions and coached baseball at Patchogue High School and Freeport High School and coached baseball at Babylon High School, all on Long Island.
