= Brooklyn Bushwicks =

Minor-league baseball team in Atlantic City, New Jersey (1998–2009)

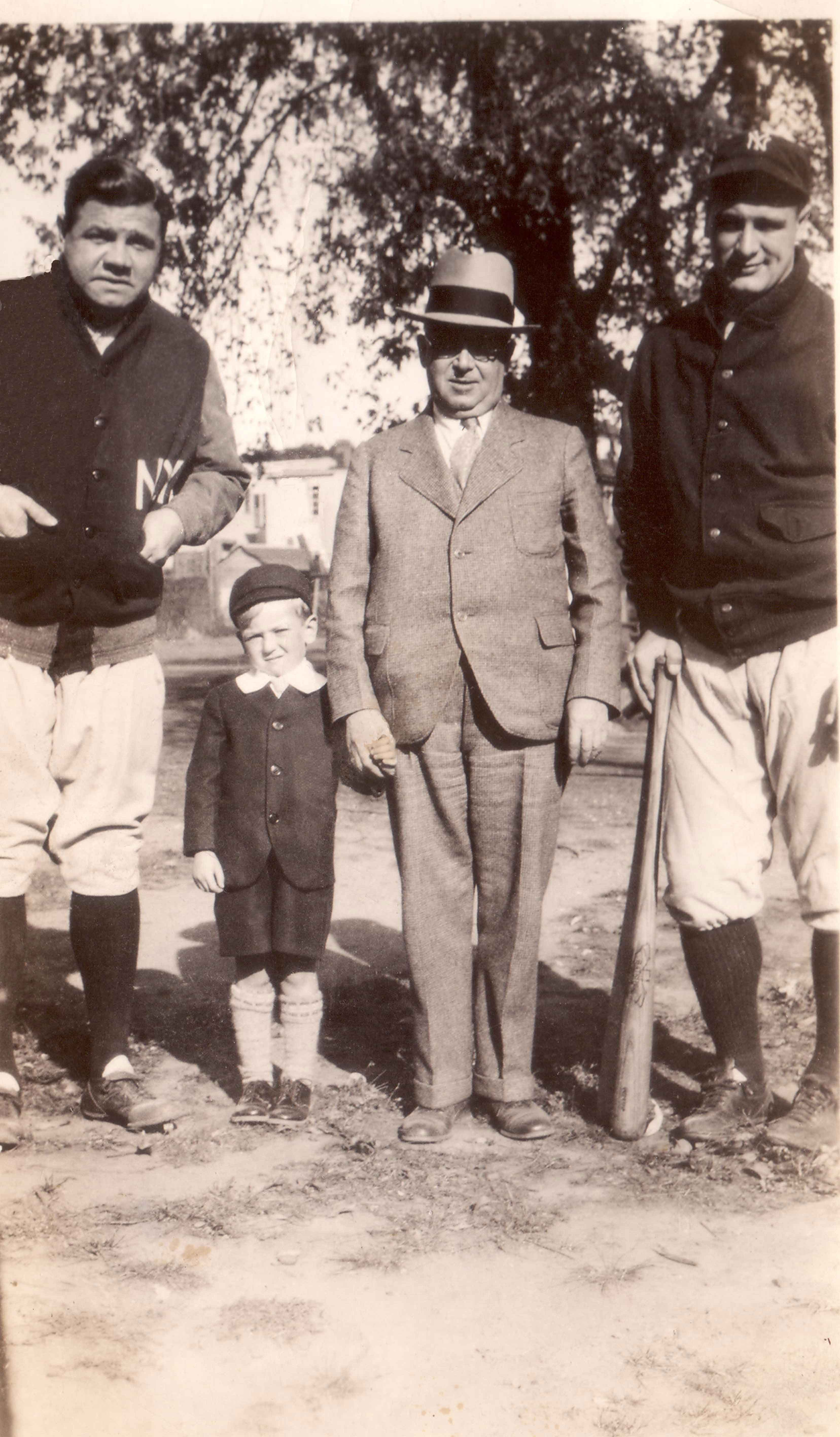
Babe Ruth, Charlie Hyman (Rosner's Grandson), Max Rosner (Bushwicks owner), and Lou Gehrig, 1929

The Brooklyn Bushwicks were an independent, semi-professional baseball team that played its games almost totally in Dexter Park in Queens from 1913 to 1951. They were unique at their time for fielding multi-ethnic rosters. They played what amounts to exhibition games against barnstorming Negro league teams, minor league baseball teams, and other semi-pro teams. The Bushwicks were owned by Max Rosner, who hired many former major league players to play on his club, including Dazzy Vance and others. Many of the famous players of the time came to play exhibitions at Dexter Park including Jackie Robinson, Dizzy Dean, Hank Greenberg, Joe DiMaggio, Satchel Paige, Whitey Ford, Babe Ruth, Lou Gehrig, and Joe Medwick. Until he became friends with Rosner, Ruth demanded upfront payments in cash before agreeing to personal appearances. The DiMaggio picture was taken during his debut year with the Yankees.

The Bushwicks played in the inaugural Interamerican Series in Caracas, Venezuela in 1946, winning the tournament.

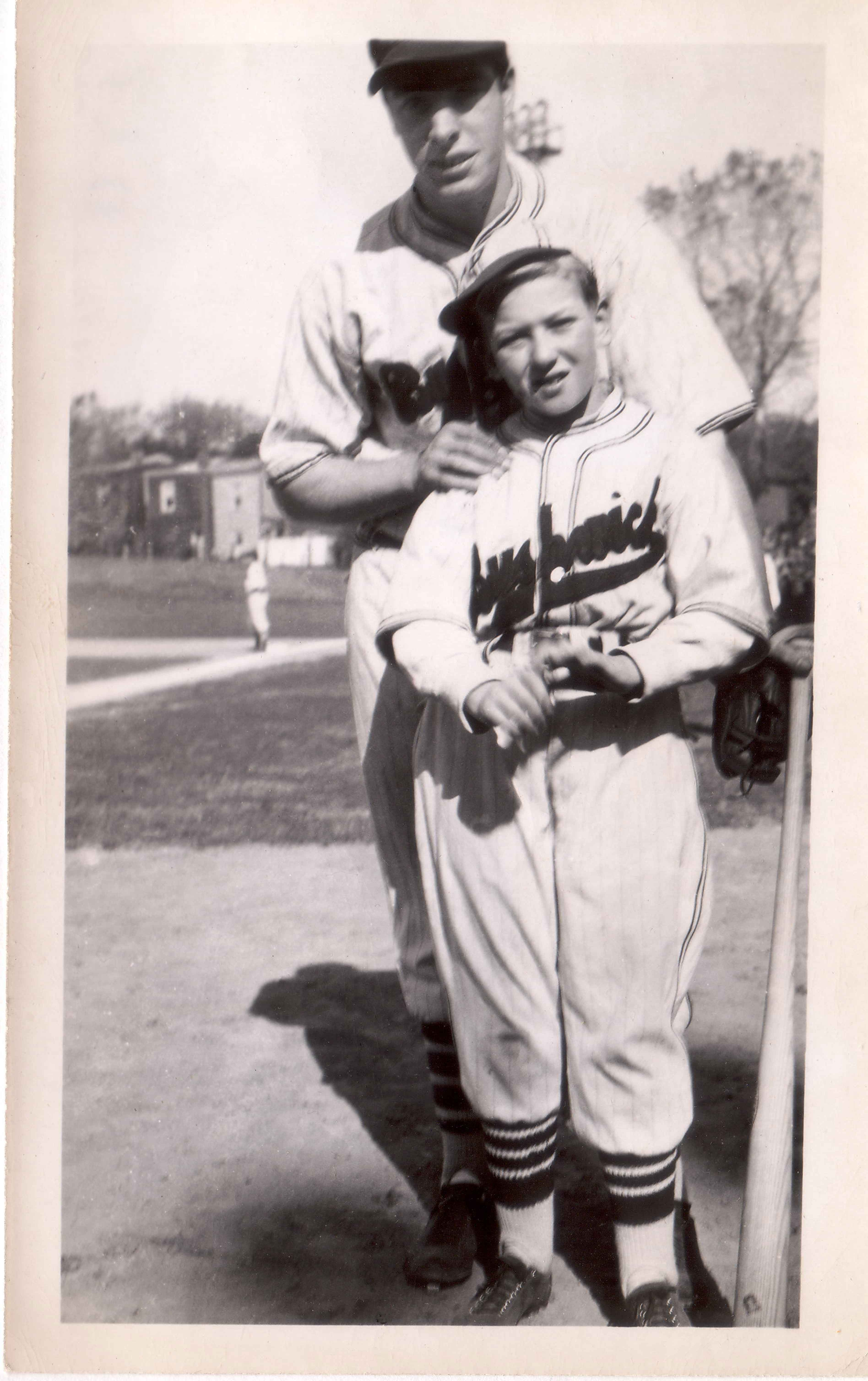
Charlie Hyman & Joe DiMaggio in Bushwicks' uniforms, 1936.

The great black stars, Josh Gibson, Cool Papa Bell and many others often opposed the Bushwicks. The team appeared on New York City television and on radio as well. The team's picture appeared in three different Spalding Guides. A book on the Bushwicks by Thomas Barthel titled, "Baseball's Peerless Semipros: The Brooklyn Bushwicks of Dexter Park," was published in 2009.

== Notable players ==
- Sam Nahem, Major League Baseball pitcher
- Overton Tremper, Brooklyn native who had a short career with the Brooklyn Dodgers
- Tony Cuccinello, Queens native who had a long Major League career, playing for, amongst other teams, the Dodgers and the New York Giants
- Al Cuccinello, brother of Tony, who played in part of one season for the Giants
- Marius Russo, Brooklyn native who pitched for several seasons for the Yankees, and who had two complete-game victories in his only two World Series appearances
- Buck Lai, Chinese American third basemen who originally played for the traveling baseball team known as the Hawaiian Chinese University Nine.
