= Bob McGraw =

American baseball player (1895–1978)

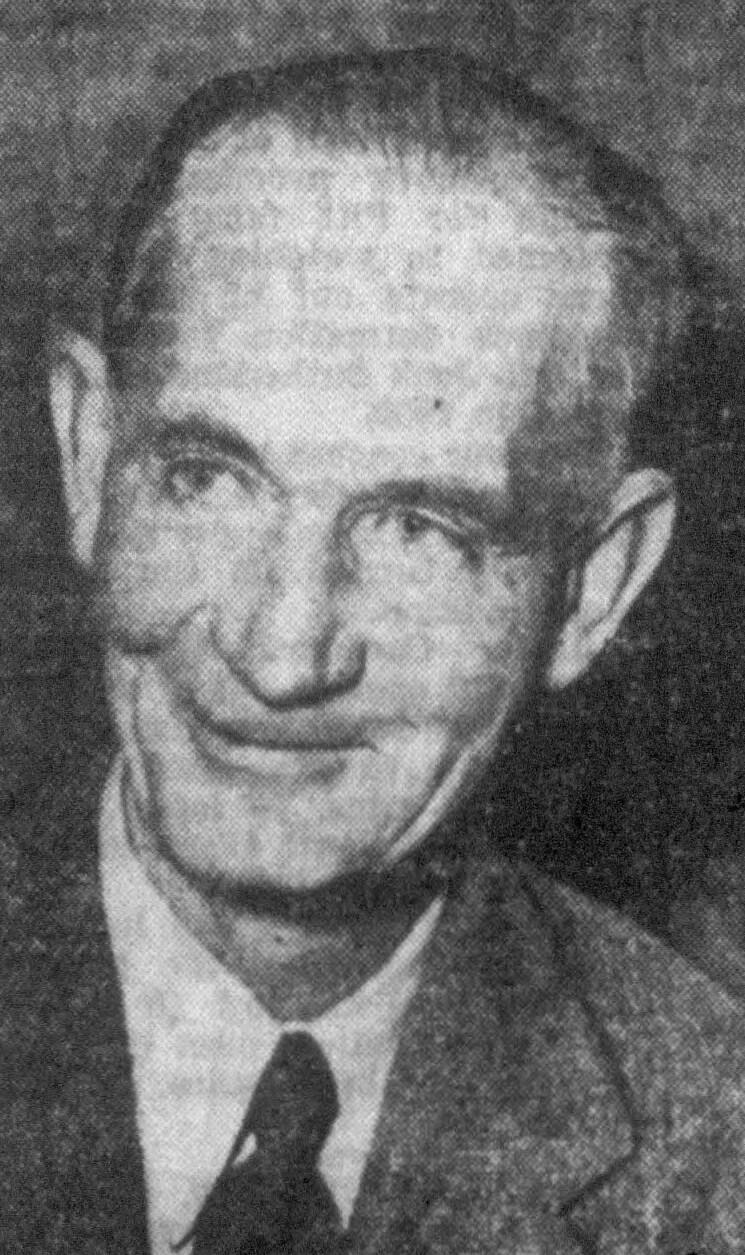
- McGraw, circa 1950
- Pitcher
- Born: April 10, 1895; La Veta, Colorado, U.S.
- Died: June 2, 1978 (aged 83); Boise, Idaho, U.S.
- Batted: Right Threw: Right

MLB debut
- September 25, 1917, for the New York Yankees

Last MLB appearance
- September 28, 1929, for the Philadelphia Phillies

MLB statistics
- Win–loss record: 26–38
- Earned run average: 5.00
- Strikeouts: 164
- Stats at Baseball Reference

Teams
- New York Yankees (1917–1919); Boston Red Sox (1919); New York Yankees (1920); Brooklyn Robins (1925–1927); St. Louis Cardinals (1927); Philadelphia Phillies (1928–1929)

Robert Emmett McGraw (April 10, 1895 – June 2, 1978) was an American professional baseball pitcher for the New York Yankees, Boston Red Sox, Brooklyn Robins, St. Louis Cardinals, and Philadelphia Phillies.

== Biography ==
McGraw was born on April 10, 1895, in La Veta, Colorado.

He went to the University of Colorado and Georgetown University. He was mainly a relief pitcher, although he occasionally started games. He broke into Major League Baseball when he was 22, on September 25, 1917. He was playing for the New York Yankees at the time.

He played for the Yankees until 1919. He was then sent to the Boston Red Sox, where he finished the 1919 season. McGraw went back to the Yankees in 1920; that was the last season he played with them.

McGraw did not play in the major leagues for another five years. He made his comeback with the Brooklyn Robins. Although he only pitched two games for them that year, he came back the next year, and played his first full major league season as a starting pitcher. He went 9-13 that year, a moderate season for someone converting from a relief pitcher to a starting pitcher.

McGraw played part of the 1927 season with the Robins, pitching one game for them before playing the rest (and the majority) of the season with the St. Louis Cardinals. With the Cardinals, most games he pitched in were as a starting pitcher, with some relief appearances.

McGraw played two more seasons in the major leagues, both of which with the Philadelphia Phillies. He went back to relief pitching with them, although he received many decisions. At 34 years old, in 1929, McGraw retired and played his final game on September 28.

In 579.1 innings, he had a win–loss record of 28–36, a winning percentage of .406, with an earned run average of 5.00 and 164 strikeouts over nine seasons.

After suffering from a broken hip on May 12, 1978, he was admitted to the Veterans Administration hospital in Boise, Idaho, where he died on June 2, 1978 at the age of 83. His funeral was held in Pueblo, Colorado, with burial at Roselawn Cemetery.
