= 1927 Cincinnati Reds season =

1927 Cincinnati Reds
- League: National League
- Ballpark: Redland Field
- City: Cincinnati, Ohio
- Owners: Garry Herrmann, C. J. McDiarmid
- Managers: Jack Hendricks

The 1927 Cincinnati Reds season was a season in American baseball. The team finished fifth in the National League with a record of 75–78, 18½ games behind the Pittsburgh Pirates.

== Off-season ==
On February 9, 1927, the Reds traded long time outfielder Edd Roush to the New York Giants in exchange for infielder High Pockets Kelly. Roush, who was acquired by the Reds from the Giants in 1916, hit .336 with 46 HR and 722 RBI while adding 197 stolen bases in 1298 games with Cincinnati from 1916 to 1926. Kelly, who had played with the Giants since 1915, led the National League in home runs in 1921, and was the league leader in RBI in 1920 and 1924. In 1136 games with New York, Kelly batted .301 with 123 HR and 762 RBI.

Long-time owner Garry Herrmann, who bought the Reds in 1902, sold the team to C. J. McDiarmid. Under Hermann's ownership, the Reds won the 1919 World Series.

== Regular season ==
The Reds got off to a very poor start in 1927, going 11-25 in their first 36 games and quickly found themselves in last place in the National League. On July 12, the Reds remained in the National League cellar with a 28-50 through their first 78 games, however, a 21-6 streak in their next 27 games saw the club vault into fifth place in the league with a 49-56 record.

Cincinnati got within one game of a .500 record, as on September 24, following a 1-0 win over the Brooklyn Robins, the Reds had a 72-73 record. That would be the closest the team would get to .500, as they finished the season with a 75-78 record, finishing 18.5 games behind the NL Pennant winning Pittsburgh Pirates.

This marked the first season since 1921 that the Reds finished with a losing record. The 75 wins was the fewest by Cincinnati since they finished 70-83 in 1921.

Catcher Bubbles Hargrave led Cincinnati with a .308 batting average, and had 35 RBI in 102 games. Outfielder Curt Walker batted .292 with a team high six home runs and 80 RBI in 30 games. Rookie outfielder Ethan Allen hit .295 with two home runs and 20 RBI, and had a team high 12 stolen bases in 111 games. High Pockets Kelly suffered through an injury plagued season, hitting .270 with five home runs and 21 RBI in 61 games.

Red Lucas led the Reds pitching staff, as he finished with an 18-11 record, leading the team in wins, as well as a team high 239.2 innings in 37 games. Carl Mays had a solid season, earning a 15-12 record with a 3.51 ERA and a team high 121 strikeouts in 44 games. Pete Donohue struggled to a 6-16 record with a 4.11 ERA in 33 games after two consecutive 20+ win seasons.

=== Season standings ===
National League
Team	W	L	Pct.	GB	Home	Road
Pittsburgh Pirates	94	60	.610	—	48‍–‍31	46‍–‍29
St. Louis Cardinals	92	61	.601	1½	55‍–‍25	37‍–‍36
New York Giants	92	62	.597	2	49‍–‍25	43‍–‍37
Chicago Cubs	85	68	.556	8½	50‍–‍28	35‍–‍40
Cincinnati Reds	75	78	.490	18½	45‍–‍35	30‍–‍43
Brooklyn Robins	65	88	.425	28½	34‍–‍39	31‍–‍49
Boston Braves	60	94	.390	34	32‍–‍41	28‍–‍53
Philadelphia Phillies	51	103	.331	43	34‍–‍43	17‍–‍60

=== Record vs. opponents ===
1927 National League record Sources:
Team	BSN	BRO	CHC	CIN	NYG	PHI	PIT	STL
Boston	—	12–10	7–15	4–18	7–15	14–8	9–13–1	7–15
Brooklyn	10–12	—	7–15	11–10	10–12–1	11–11	8–14	8–14
Chicago	15–7	15–7	—	14–8	10–12	13–9	9–13	9–12
Cincinnati	18–4	10–11	8–14	—	7–15	16–6	8–14	8–14
New York	15–7	12–10–1	12–10	15–7	—	15–7	11–11	12–10
Philadelphia	8–14	11–11	9–13	6–16	7–15	—	7–15–1	3–19
Pittsburgh	13–9–1	14–8	13–9	14–8	11–11	15–7–1	—	14–8
St. Louis	15–7	14–8	12–9	14–8	10–12	19–3	8–14	—

=== Roster ===
1927 Cincinnati Reds
Roster
Pitchers: Pete Appleton; Jim Beckman; Pete Donohue; Ray Kolp; Red Lucas; Dolf Luque; Jakie May; Carl Mays; Art Nehf; Eppa Rixey	Catchers: Bubbles Hargrave; Val Picinich; Clyde Sukeforth; Infielders: Hughie Critz; Chuck Dressen; Hod Ford; George Kelly; Babe Pinelli; Wally Pipp; Pinky Pittinger; Pee-Wee Wanninger; Jack White; Ray Wolf	Outfielders: Ethan Allen; Rube Bressler; Cuckoo Christensen; Pid Purdy; Curt Walker; Billy Zitzmann	Manager: Jack Hendricks; Coaches: Grover Land

== Player stats ==
=== Batting ===
==== Starters by position ====
Note: Pos = Position; G = Games played; AB = At bats; H = Hits; Avg. = Batting average; HR = Home runs; RBI = Runs batted in

Pos	Player	G	AB	H	Avg.	HR	RBI
C	Bubbles Hargrave	102	305	94	.308	0	35
1B	Wally Pipp	122	443	115	.260	2	41
2B	Hughie Critz	113	396	110	.278	4	49
SS	Hod Ford	115	409	112	.274	1	46
3B	Chuck Dressen	144	548	160	.292	2	55
OF	Curt Walker	146	527	154	.292	6	80
OF	Ethan Allen	111	359	106	.295	2	20
OF	Rube Bressler	124	467	136	.291	3	77

==== Other batters ====
Note: G = Games played; AB = At bats; H = Hits; Avg. = Batting average; HR = Home runs; RBI = Runs batted in

Player	G	AB	H	Avg.	HR	RBI
Billy Zitzmann	88	232	66	.284	0	24
George Kelly	61	222	60	.270	5	21
Cuckoo Christensen	57	185	47	.254	0	16
Val Picinich	65	173	44	.254	0	12
Pee-Wee Wanninger	28	93	23	.247	0	8
Pinky Pittenger	31	84	23	.274	1	10
Babe Pinelli	30	76	15	.197	1	4
Pid Purdy	18	62	22	.355	1	12
Clyde Sukeforth	38	58	11	.190	0	2
Jack White	5	4	0	.000	0	0
Ray Wolf	1	1	0	.000	0	0

=== Pitching ===
==== Starting pitchers ====
Note: G = Games pitched; IP = Innings pitched; W = Wins; L = Losses; ERA = Earned run average; SO = Strikeouts

Player	G	IP	W	L	ERA	SO
Red Lucas	37	239.2	18	11	3.38	51
Jakie May	44	235.2	15	12	3.51	121
Dolf Luque	29	230.2	13	12	3.20	76
Eppa Rixey	34	219.2	12	10	3.48	42
Pete Donohue	33	190.2	6	16	4.11	48

==== Other pitchers ====
Note: G = Games pitched; IP = Innings pitched; W = Wins; L = Losses; ERA = Earned run average; SO = Strikeouts

Player	G	IP	W	L	ERA	SO
Ray Kolp	24	82.1	3	3	3.06	28
Carl Mays	14	82.0	3	7	3.51	17
Art Nehf	21	45.1	3	5	5.56	21
Pete Appleton	6	29.2	2	1	1.82	3
Jim Beckman	4	12.1	0	1	5.84	0
