= Les Bell =

American baseball player (1901–1985)

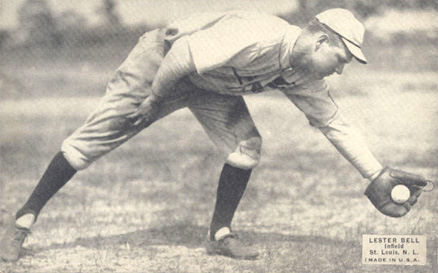
- Third baseman
- Born: December 14, 1901; Harrisburg, Pennsylvania, U.S.
- Died: December 26, 1985 (aged 84); Hershey, Pennsylvania, U.S.
- Batted: Right Threw: Right

MLB debut
- September 17, 1923, for the St. Louis Cardinals

Last MLB appearance
- September 27, 1931, for the Chicago Cubs

MLB statistics
- Batting average: .290
- Home runs: 66
- Runs batted in: 509
- Stats at Baseball Reference

Teams
- St. Louis Cardinals (1923–1927); Boston Braves (1928–1929); Chicago Cubs (1930–1931)

Career highlights and awards
- World Series champion (1926)

Lester Rowland Bell (December 14, 1901 – December 26, 1985) was an American professional baseball player, a third baseman who appeared in 896 games played in the Major Leagues from 1923 to 1931 for the St. Louis Cardinals, Boston Braves and Chicago Cubs. A native of Harrisburg, Pennsylvania, he threw and batted right-handed, stood 5 feet 11 inches (1.80 m) tall and weighed 165 pounds (75 kg).

Bell's professional career began in 1921 in minor league baseball. After trials with the Cardinals in both 1923 and 1924, he supplanted Howard Freigau and Specs Toporcer to become the Redbirds' regular third baseman in 1925 and finished third on the team in runs batted in with 88, behind only Baseball Hall of Famers Rogers Hornsby and Jim Bottomley.

Then in 1926 Bell reached career bests in hits (189), home runs (17), runs batted in (100) and batting average (.325). He finished in the top five in the National League in hits, slugging percentage (.518), OPS (.901), total bases (301), home runs, extra-base hits (64) and RBI. He also was among the NL leaders in strikeouts (62) and errors committed by a third baseman (22). Bell ranked sixth in the National League Most Valuable Player Award polling as the Cardinals won their first pennant and World Series championship. In the 1926 World Series against the New York Yankees, he played in all seven games and collected seven hits, including a two-run homer in Game 6 off Urban Shocker that salted away a 10–2 St. Louis triumph.

In 1927, however, Bell played in only 115 games and his production fell off considerably, and in March 1928 he was traded to the Braves for fellow third baseman Andy High. Bell was a regular for Boston in both 1928 and 1929, but the Braves placed him on waivers after the 1929 campaign and he was claimed by the Cubs. He played two more big-league seasons in back-up roles before he returned to the minor leagues, where he would spend eight seasons as manager of his hometown Harrisburg Senators of the Class B Interstate League.

During his nine-year Major League career, Les Bell collected 938 hits, with 184 doubles and 49 triples accompanying his 66 home runs. He had 509 RBI in the majors.
