= Red Peery =

American baseball player (1906–1985)

- Pitcher
- Born: August 15, 1906; Payson, Utah, U.S.
- Died: May 6, 1985 (aged 78); Salt Lake City, Utah, U.S.
- Batted: Left Threw: Left

MLB debut
- September 22, 1927, for the Pittsburgh Pirates

Last MLB appearance
- September 27, 1929, for the Boston Braves

MLB statistics
- Win–loss record: 0–1
- Strikeouts: 3
- Earned run average: 5.00
- Stats at Baseball Reference

Teams
- Pittsburgh Pirates (1927); Boston Braves (1929)

George Allan "Red" Peery (August 15, 1906 – May 6, 1985) was an American professional baseball pitcher. He played parts of two seasons in Major League Baseball, 1927 for the Pittsburgh Pirates and 1929 for the Boston Braves.
