= Foster Edwards =

American baseball player (1903-1980)

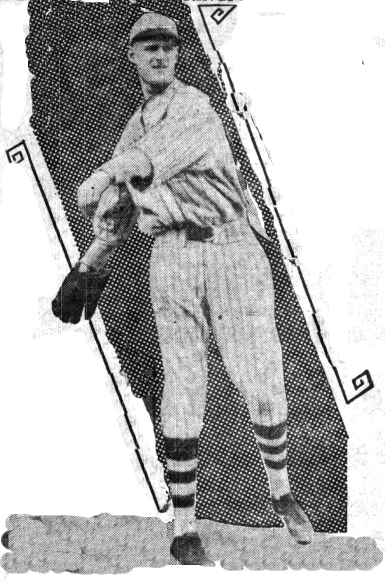
- Pitcher
- Born: September 1, 1903; Holstein, Iowa, U.S.
- Died: January 4, 1980 (aged 76); Orleans, Massachusetts, U.S.
- Batted: Right Threw: Right

MLB debut
- July 2, 1925, for the Boston Braves

Last MLB appearance
- May 21, 1930, for the New York Yankees

MLB statistics
- Win–loss record: 6–9
- Earned run average: 4.76
- Strikeouts: 60
- Stats at Baseball Reference

Teams
- Boston Braves (1925–1928); New York Yankees (1930)

Foster Hamilton "Eddie" Edwards (September 1, 1903 – January 4, 1980) was an American professional baseball pitcher who appeared in 56 games in Major League Baseball, 54 for the Boston Braves (1925–28) and two for the New York Yankees (1930). He batted and threw right-handed, and was listed as 6 feet 3 inches (1.91 m) tall and 175 pounds (79 kg). He was born in Holstein, Iowa.

Edwards attended Dartmouth College. He appeared in his first MLB game in his maiden professional season. On July 2, 1925, at Ebbets Field, he entered a lopsided content with his Braves trailing the Brooklyn Robins 15–2 in the seventh inning; he permitted five more runs in his two innings of work, but only two were earned, as Brooklyn romped 20–7. In 1926, his sophomore season in pro ball, he led the high-level Eastern League in games won (25) and posted an excellent 2.95 earned run average. In September, Edwards started three games for the Braves and came away with two victories and one no-decision, defeating the Chicago Cubs September 15 (3–1) and the Pittsburgh Pirates on the 23rd (2–1).

Edwards then spent 1927 as a member of the Boston pitching staff—his only full season in the majors. He appeared in 33 games, but struggled against National League hitters, winning only two of ten decisions with a subpar 4.99 ERA. The 1928 campaign saw him spend 21 games with the Braves and seven with the Buffalo Bisons of the International League. He went 2–1 with the Braves, but again was ineffective with a 5.66 earned run average and a WHIP of 1.824.

Edwards was out of baseball in 1929, but in 1930 he returned for one final campaign. In two early-season games for the Yankees, he was treated harshly in relief by the Boston Red Sox and Philadelphia Athletics, and spent the bulk of the year in the International League, with the Baltimore Orioles.

Altogether, in his 56 MLB contests, he compiled a 6–9 won–lost record and a 4.76 earned run average, with four complete games in 17 starts. He allowed 193 hits and 84 bases on balls in 170 innings pitched, with 60 strikeouts.

Foster Edwards died at age 76 in Barnstable, Massachusetts, on January 4, 1980.
