= 1927 New York Giants (MLB) season =

1927 New York Giants
- League: National League
- Ballpark: Polo Grounds
- City: New York City
- Record: 92–62 (.597)
- League place: 3rd
- Owners: Charles Stoneham
- Managers: John McGraw

The 1927 New York Giants season was the franchise's 45th season. The team finished third in the National League with a record of 92–62, two games behind the Pittsburgh Pirates.

== Offseason ==
During the offseason, the Giants acquired Rogers Hornsby from the St. Louis Cardinals for Frankie Frisch and Jimmy Ring. Hornsby's offensive numbers rebounded in 1927, as he hit .361 and led the league in runs scored (133), walks (86), and an on-base percentage (.448). The deal was held up because Hornsby, as part of his contract as the manager of the Cardinals (he was a player-manager at the time), owned several shares of stock in the Cardinals. Cardinals owner Sam Breadon offered Hornsby a sum for the stock considerably lower than what Hornsby demanded for it, and neither would budge. Eventually, the other owners of the National League made up the difference, and the trade went through.

=== Notable transactions ===
- December 20, 1926: Frankie Frisch and Jimmy Ring were traded by the Giants to the St. Louis Cardinals for Rogers Hornsby.

== Regular season ==
=== Season standings ===
National League
Team	W	L	Pct.	GB	Home	Road
Pittsburgh Pirates	94	60	.610	—	48‍–‍31	46‍–‍29
St. Louis Cardinals	92	61	.601	1½	55‍–‍25	37‍–‍36
New York Giants	92	62	.597	2	49‍–‍25	43‍–‍37
Chicago Cubs	85	68	.556	8½	50‍–‍28	35‍–‍40
Cincinnati Reds	75	78	.490	18½	45‍–‍35	30‍–‍43
Brooklyn Robins	65	88	.425	28½	34‍–‍39	31‍–‍49
Boston Braves	60	94	.390	34	32‍–‍41	28‍–‍53
Philadelphia Phillies	51	103	.331	43	34‍–‍43	17‍–‍60

=== Record vs. opponents ===
1927 National League record Sources:
Team	BSN	BRO	CHC	CIN	NYG	PHI	PIT	STL
Boston	—	12–10	7–15	4–18	7–15	14–8	9–13–1	7–15
Brooklyn	10–12	—	7–15	11–10	10–12–1	11–11	8–14	8–14
Chicago	15–7	15–7	—	14–8	10–12	13–9	9–13	9–12
Cincinnati	18–4	10–11	8–14	—	7–15	16–6	8–14	8–14
New York	15–7	12–10–1	12–10	15–7	—	15–7	11–11	12–10
Philadelphia	8–14	11–11	9–13	6–16	7–15	—	7–15–1	3–19
Pittsburgh	13–9–1	14–8	13–9	14–8	11–11	15–7–1	—	14–8
St. Louis	15–7	14–8	12–9	14–8	10–12	19–3	8–14	—

=== Notable transactions ===
- May 9, 1927: Don Songer was purchased by the Giants from the Pittsburgh Pirates.

=== Roster ===
1927 New York Giants
Roster
Pitchers: Virgil Barnes; Jack Bentley; Larry Benton; Hank Boney; Joe Bush; Ben Cantwell; Virgil Cheeves; Bill Clarkson; Jim Faulkner; Freddie Fitzsimmons; Kent Greenfield; Burleigh Grimes; Dutch Henry; Mul Holland; Art Johnson; Hugh McQuillan; Norman Plitt; Ned Porter; Don Songer; Fay Thomas; Bill Walker	Catchers: Jack Cummings; Al DeVormer; Jim Hamby; Mickey O'Neil; Red Smith; Zack Taylor; Infielders: Doc Farrell; Rogers Hornsby; Travis Jackson; Freddie Lindstrom; Andy Reese; Bill Terry	Outfielders: George Harper; Tex Jeanes; Joe Klinger; Les Mann; Heinie Mueller; Mel Ott; Edd Roush; Herb Thomas; Ty Tyson; Other batters: Buck Jordan	Manager: John McGraw; Coaches: Roger Bresnahan

== Player stats ==
=== Batting ===
==== Starters by position ====
Note: Pos = Position; G = Games played; AB = At bats; H = Hits; Avg. = Batting average; HR = Home runs; RBI = Runs batted in

Pos	Player	G	AB	H	Avg.	HR	RBI
C	Zack Taylor	83	258	60	.233	0	21
1B	Bill Terry	150	580	189	.326	20	121
2B	Rogers Hornsby	155	568	205	.361	26	125
SS	Travis Jackson	127	469	149	.318	14	98
3B	Freddie Lindstrom	138	562	172	.306	7	58
OF	Edd Roush	140	570	173	.304	7	58
OF	Heinie Mueller	84	190	55	.289	3	19
OF	George Harper	145	483	160	.331	16	87

==== Other batters ====
Note: G = Games played; AB = At bats; H = Hits; Avg. = Batting average; HR = Home runs; RBI = Runs batted in

Player	G	AB	H	Avg.	HR	RBI
Andy Reese	97	355	94	.265	4	21
Mel Ott	82	163	46	.282	1	19
Ty Tyson	43	159	42	.264	1	17
Doc Farrell	42	142	55	.387	3	34
Al DeVormer	68	141	35	.248	2	21
Jack Cummings	43	80	29	.363	2	14
Les Mann	29	67	22	.328	2	10
Jim Hamby	21	52	10	.192	0	5
Mickey O'Neil	16	38	5	.132	0	3
Tex Jeanes	11	20	6	.300	0	0
Herb Thomas	13	17	3	.176	0	1
Buck Jordan	5	5	1	.200	0	0
Joe Klinger	3	5	2	.400	0	0
Red Smith	1	0	0	----	0	0

=== Pitching ===
==== Starting pitchers ====
Note: G = Games pitched; IP = Innings pitched; W = Wins; L = Losses; ERA = Earned run average; SO = Strikeouts

Player	G	IP	W	L	ERA	SO
Burleigh Grimes	39	259.2	19	8	3.54	102
Freddie Fitzsimmons	42	244.2	17	10	3.72	78
Virgil Barnes	35	228.2	14	11	3.98	66
Larry Benton	29	173.0	13	5	3.95	65
Hugh McQuillan	11	58.0	5	4	4.50	17

==== Other pitchers ====
Note: G = Games pitched; IP = Innings pitched; W = Wins; L = Losses; ERA = Earned run average; SO = Strikeouts

Player	G	IP	W	L	ERA	SO
Dutch Henry	45	163.2	11	6	4.23	40
Bill Clarkson	26	86.2	3	9	4.36	28
Ben Cantwell	5	19.2	1	1	4.12	6
Joe Bush	3	12.0	1	1	7.50	6
Jim Faulkner	3	9.2	1	0	3.72	2

==== Relief pitchers ====
Note: G = Games pitched; W = Wins; L = Losses; SV = Saves; ERA = Earned run average; SO = Strikeouts

Player	G	W	L	SV	ERA	SO
Don Songer	22	3	5	1	2.86	9
Kent Greenfield	12	2	2	0	9.45	4
Fay Thomas	9	0	0	0	3.31	4
Jack Bentley	4	0	0	0	2.79	3
Virgil Cheeves	3	0	0	0	4.26	1
Hank Boney	3	0	0	0	2.25	0
Norman Plitt	3	1	0	0	3.68	0
Bill Walker	3	0	0	0	9.00	4
Mul Holland	2	1	0	0	0.00	0
Art Johnson	1	0	0	0	0.00	0
Ned Porter	1	0	0	0	0.00	0
Tex Jeanes	1	0	0	0	9.00	0
