= Hank Grampp =

American baseball player (1903–1986)

- Pitcher
- Born: September 28, 1903; New York, New York, U.S.
- Died: March 24, 1986 (aged 82); New York, New York, U.S.
- Batted: Right Threw: Right

MLB debut
- June 21, 1927, for the Chicago Cubs

Last MLB appearance
- October 6, 1929, for the Chicago Cubs

MLB statistics
- Win–loss record: 0–1
- Earned run average: 16.20
- Strikeouts: 3
- Stats at Baseball Reference

Teams
- Chicago Cubs (1927, 1929)

Henry Eckhard Grampp (September 28, 1903 – March 24, 1986) was an American pitcher in Major League Baseball. He played for the Chicago Cubs in 1927 and 1929.
