= Herman Layne =

American baseball player (1901–1973)

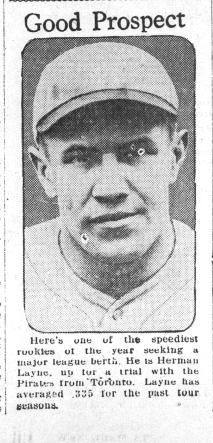
- Outfielder
- Born: February 13, 1901; New Haven, West Virginia
- Died: August 27, 1973 (aged 72); Gallipolis, Ohio
- Batted: Right Threw: Right

MLB debut
- April 16, 1927, for the Pittsburgh Pirates

Last MLB appearance
- May 31, 1927, for the Pittsburgh Pirates

MLB statistics
- Games played: 11
- At bats: 6
- Hits: 0
- Stats at Baseball Reference

Teams
- Pittsburgh Pirates (1927)

Herman Layne (February 13, 1901 – August 27, 1973) was an outfielder in Major League Baseball. He played for the Pittsburgh Pirates in 1927. He was married to the late Norene (Fisher) Layne and had one daughter, Enid Adams, one grandson, Bruce Adams and two great-grandchildren Michael and Lori.
