= Sid Graves =

American baseball player

- Outfielder
- Born: November 30, 1901; Marblehead, Massachusetts, U.S.
- Died: December 26, 1983 (aged 82); Biddeford, Maine, U.S.
- Batted: Right Threw: Right

MLB debut
- July 23, 1927, for the Boston Braves

Last MLB appearance
- August 5, 1927, for the Boston Braves

MLB statistics
- Games played: 7
- At bats: 20
- Hits: 5
- Stats at Baseball Reference

Teams
- Boston Braves (1927)

Samuel Sidney Graves (November 30, 1901 – December 26, 1983) was an American outfielder in Major League Baseball. Nicknamed "Whitey", he played for the Boston Braves in 1927.
