= Jay Partridge =

American baseball player (1902-1974)

- Second baseman
- Born: November 15, 1902; Mountville, Georgia, U.S.
- Died: January 14, 1974 (aged 71); Nashville, Tennessee, U.S.
- Batted: Left Threw: Right

MLB debut
- April 12, 1927, for the Brooklyn Robins

Last MLB appearance
- July 21, 1928, for the Brooklyn Robins

MLB statistics
- Batting average: .259
- Home runs: 7
- Runs batted in: 52
- Stats at Baseball Reference

Teams
- Brooklyn Robins (1927–1928)

James Bugg Partridge (November 15, 1902 – January 14, 1974) was an American second baseman in Major League Baseball. He played for the Brooklyn Robins.

== Biography ==
Partridge was born in Mountville, Georgia. He attended Oglethorpe University and played on the baseball team. After graduating in 1925, he signed with the Brooklyn Robins. That season, he hit .325 in the Eastern League. He then moved to the Southern Association's Nashville Volunteers and hit .333.

Partridge joined the Robins in 1927. In his only full major league season, he batted .260 with seven home runs and 40 runs batted in. His fielding percentage at second base was also below average. After another subpar year in 1928, he was sent back to Nashville.

Partridge had his best season in 1930. Taking advantage of Nashville's short ballpark dimensions, he batted a career-high .361 and ripped 40 home runs, which was the second-most in the league. Partridge went to the International League in 1931 and never hit as well again. He retired in 1933.

Partridge was elected into the Oglethorpe University Athletic Hall of Fame in 1967. He died in 1974, at the age of 71.
