= Howard Freigau =

American baseball player (1902–1932)

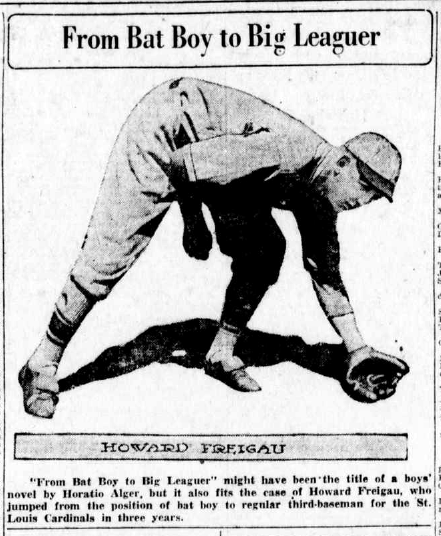
- Third baseman / Shortstop
- Born: August 1, 1902; Dayton, Ohio, U.S.
- Died: July 18, 1932 (aged 29); Chattanooga, Tennessee, U.S.
- Batted: Right Threw: Right

MLB debut
- September 13, 1922, for the St. Louis Cardinals

Last MLB appearance
- September 29, 1928, for the Boston Braves

MLB statistics
- Batting average: .272
- Home runs: 15
- Runs batted in: 226
- Stats at Baseball Reference

Teams
- St. Louis Cardinals (1922–1925); Chicago Cubs (1925–1927); Brooklyn Robins (1928); Boston Braves (1928)

Howard Earl Freigau (August 1, 1902 – July 18, 1932), nicknamed "Ty", was an American professional baseball third baseman and shortstop. He played seven seasons in Major League Baseball (MLB) between 1922 and 1928 for the St. Louis Cardinals, Chicago Cubs, Brooklyn Robins and Boston Braves. The 5 ft 10 in (1.78 m), 160 lb (73 kg) Freigau batted and threw right-handed.

Freigau attended Ohio Wesleyan University, alma mater of Branch Rickey, the manager of the Cardinals during Freigau's tenure in St. Louis. On May 23, 1925, Rickey traded Freigau to the Cubs in a deal to obtain starting catcher Bob O'Farrell, and the third baseman went on to post his most successful season, batting .299 (including .307 as a Cub) and posting career highs in hits (150), home runs (8) and runs batted in (71). Freigau also was the Cubs' starter at third in 1926, but lost his regular job the following season and was briefly sent to the minor leagues. He divided his 1928 season, his last in the Majors, between Brooklyn and Boston and played in 69 games before returning to the minor leagues for the rest of his abbreviated career.

In July 1932, when playing for the Knoxville Smokies of the Southern Association, Freigau went for an evening swim in Chattanooga, Tennessee. He dived headfirst into the shallow end of a swimming pool, broke his neck, and drowned at the age of 29.

Freigau's 537 big-league hits included 99 doubles and 25 triples, as well as 15 home runs.
