= Doc Farrell =

American baseball player (1901–1966)

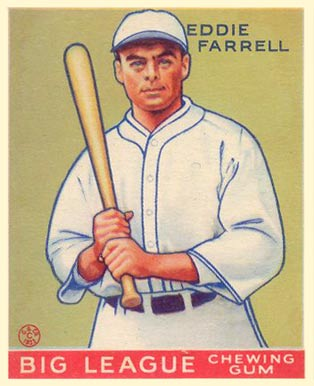
- Infielder
- Born: December 26, 1901; Johnson City, New York, U.S.
- Died: December 20, 1966 (aged 64); Glen Ridge, New Jersey, U.S.
- Batted: Right Threw: Right

MLB debut
- June 15, 1925, for the New York Giants

Last MLB appearance
- May 1, 1935, for the Boston Red Sox

MLB statistics
- Batting average: .260
- Home runs: 10
- Runs batted in: 213
- Stats at Baseball Reference

Teams
- New York Giants (1925–1927); Boston Braves (1927–1929); New York Giants (1929); St. Louis Cardinals (1930); Chicago Cubs (1930); New York Yankees (1932–1933); Boston Red Sox (1935)

Career highlights and awards
- World Series champion (1932)

Edward Stephen "Doc" Farrell (December 26, 1901 – December 20, 1966) was an American infielder in Major League Baseball, playing mainly as a shortstop between 1925 and 1935 for the New York Giants (1925–1927, 1929), Boston Braves (1927–1929), St. Louis Cardinals (1930), Chicago Cubs (1930), New York Yankees (1932–1933), and Boston Red Sox (1935). Listed at 5 ft 8 in (1.73 m), 160 lb., Farrell batted and threw right-handed. He was born in Johnson City, New York.

Farrell was the captain of the University of Pennsylvania baseball team before signing with the New York Giants prior to the 1925 season. Farrell intended to pursue a career in dentistry, and originally signed with the New York Giants in order to establish a financial foundation for his dental practice. A well-traveled utility, he played with six different teams in a span of nine years, including two stints for the Giants. His most productive season came in 1927, when he posted career-highs with a .316 batting average, 92 RBI, 57 runs, and 152 games while playing three different infield positions for the Giants and Braves, being considered in the National League MVP vote at the end of the season. He played exclusively at shortstop 132 games for the 1928 Braves and also won a World Series ring with the Yankees 1932 World Champions, despite he did not play in the Series.

In a nine-season career, Farrell was a .260 hitter (467-for-1799) with ten home runs and 213 RBI in 591 games, including 181 runs, 63 doubles, eight triples, and 14 stolen bases. As a fielder, he appeared in 553 games at shortstop (376), second base (118), third base (56) and first base (3).

Farrell died at his home in Glen Ridge, New Jersey, just six days shy of his 65th birthday. In his last will and testament, he requested that none of his grandchildren become fans of the Yankees organization due to issues with the team's administration in his final year with the team.
