= Fresco Thompson =

American baseball player (1902–1968)

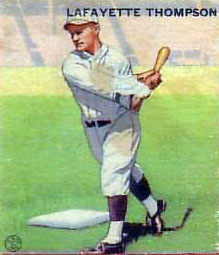
- Second baseman
- Born: June 6, 1902; Centreville, Alabama, U.S.
- Died: November 20, 1968 (aged 66); Fullerton, California, U.S.
- Batted: Right Threw: Right

MLB debut
- September 5, 1925, for the Pittsburgh Pirates

Last MLB appearance
- April 22, 1934, for the New York Giants

MLB statistics
- Batting average: .298
- Home runs: 13
- Runs batted in: 249
- Stats at Baseball Reference

Teams
- Pittsburgh Pirates (1925); New York Giants (1926); Philadelphia Phillies (1927–1930); Brooklyn Robins / Dodgers (1931–1932); New York Giants (1934)

Lafayette Fresco Thompson Jr. (June 6, 1902 – November 20, 1968) was an American Major League Baseball second baseman and executive. Thompson was born in Centreville, Alabama. In 1916, when he was 14, his family moved to New York City, where Thompson attended George Washington High School and Columbia University. At Columbia, he was a football teammate of Lou Gehrig's, but Thompson left the school to turn professional before he could join Gehrig on the Lions' baseball team.

== Playing career ==
A right-handed batter and thrower, Thompson stood 5 ft 8 in (1.73 m) tall and weighed 150 lb (68 kg). His pro career began at the Class D level of the minors in 1923. After three years of seasoning, he made his debut in September 1925 with the eventual world champion Pittsburgh Pirates. Following brief appearances with the Pirates (14 games in 1925) and New York Giants (two games in 1926), Thompson was traded to the Philadelphia Phillies in 1927 when the Giants obtained Rogers Hornsby. He had his most productive years with the Phils, playing in Baker Bowl, twice hitting over .300. Overall, in 669 games played for four teams over all or parts of nine National League seasons (1925–32; 1934), Thompson batted .298 in 2,560 at bats. His 762 hits included 149 doubles, 34 triples and 13 home runs, and he collected 249 RBI. He finished his career with a .962 fielding percentage.

== Dodger executive ==
After his playing days, Thompson managed in the minor leagues before becoming an assistant farm system director for the Brooklyn Dodgers. Thompson moved up the executive ladder, and survived the front-office purge that followed Branch Rickey's departure in October 1950. During the shakeup, Thompson became a vice president and the team's second-ranking baseball executive, responsible for all minor league operations, while another VP, Buzzie Bavasi, assumed control of the big-league Dodgers' operations. Thompson continued as head of the club's extensive player development system after the Dodgers moved to Los Angeles in 1958. Over Thompson's 22 years as a senior farm system executive, the Dodgers produced six National League Rookie of the Year Award winners, and won ten NL pennants and four World Series titles.

When Bavasi left to become president of the expansion San Diego Padres on June 4, 1968, Thompson became the Dodgers' executive vice president and general manager. During the transition, he presided over the Dodgers' hugely successful 1968 amateur draft. The regular and secondary phases of the 1968 June lottery netted the Dodgers Steve Garvey, Ron Cey, Bill Buckner, Bobby Valentine, Joe Ferguson, Doyle Alexander and others.

However, a few weeks after his promotion, Thompson was diagnosed with cancer, and he died in November in Fullerton, California, at the age of 66. He was succeeded by the club's scouting director, Al Campanis, as general manager, formally titled vice president, player personnel. The following season, Ted Sizemore, developed in Thompson's farm system, was named the 1969 NL Rookie of the Year.

Sporting positions
Preceded by Buzzie Bavasi	Los Angeles Dodgers General Manager; 1968	Succeeded by Al Campanis
