= Jack Scott (baseball) =

American baseball player (1892–1959)

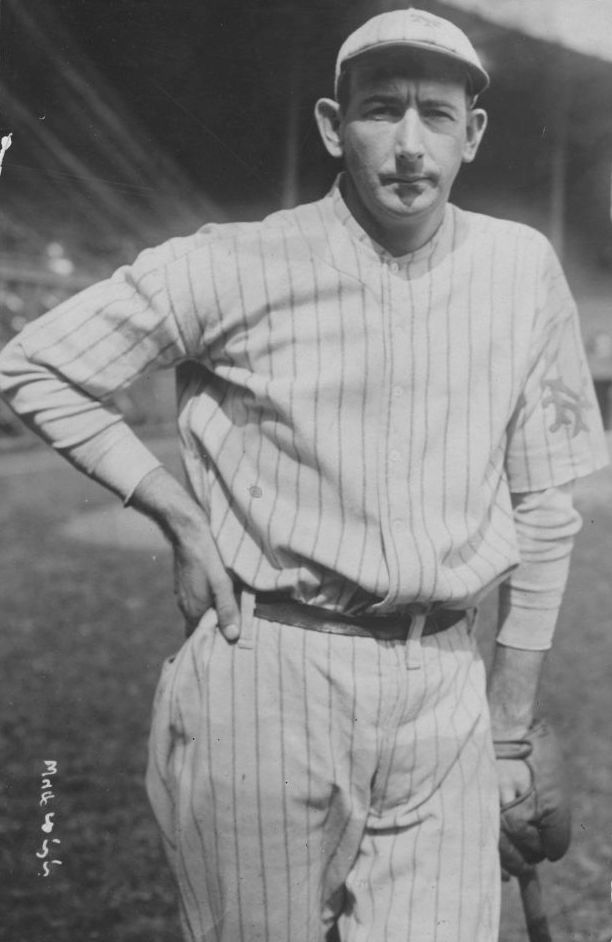
- Pitcher
- Born: April 18, 1892; Ridgeway, North Carolina, U.S.
- Died: November 30, 1959 (aged 67); Durham, North Carolina, U.S.
- Batted: Left Threw: Right

MLB debut
- September 6, 1916, for the Pittsburgh Pirates

Last MLB appearance
- September 22, 1929, for the New York Giants

MLB statistics
- Win–loss record: 103–109
- Earned run average: 3.85
- Strikeouts: 657
- Stats at Baseball Reference

Teams
- Pittsburgh Pirates (1916); Boston Braves (1917, 1919–1921); Cincinnati Reds (1922); New York Giants (1922–1923, 1925–1926); Philadelphia Phillies (1927); New York Giants (1928–1929)

Career highlights and awards
- World Series champion (1922)

John William Scott (April 18, 1892 – November 30, 1959) was an American professional baseball pitcher. He played in Major League Baseball (MLB) from 1916 to 1929 for the Pittsburgh Pirates, Boston Braves, Cincinnati Reds, New York Giants, and Philadelphia Phillies.

A right-hander, Scott pitched a four-hit shutout in Game 3 of the 1922 World Series against the New York Yankees, and he and the Giants went on to win the championship. Scott started one game of the 1923 World Series against the Yankees as well.

He was a knuckleball pitcher and workhorse, leading the league in games pitched three times, including 50 appearances on the mound in 1926.

Scott started both ends of a doubleheader on June 19, 1927 for the Phillies, beating the Reds in the opener 3-1, dropping the nightcap 3-0. He threw complete games in each, allowing just four runs and one walk. Scott is the last pitcher to start and pitch complete games in both ends of a doubleheader.

He finished his career with a record of 103-109 with a 3.85 earned run average and 657 strikeouts.

Scott was a very good hitter as pitchers go. His 187 career hits included five home runs, 73 RBI, 31 doubles and four triples, with a batting average of .275 (187-for-680). He recorded a season high 17 RBI for the 1927 Philadelphia Phillies.
