= Tony Kaufmann =

American baseball player (1900–1982)

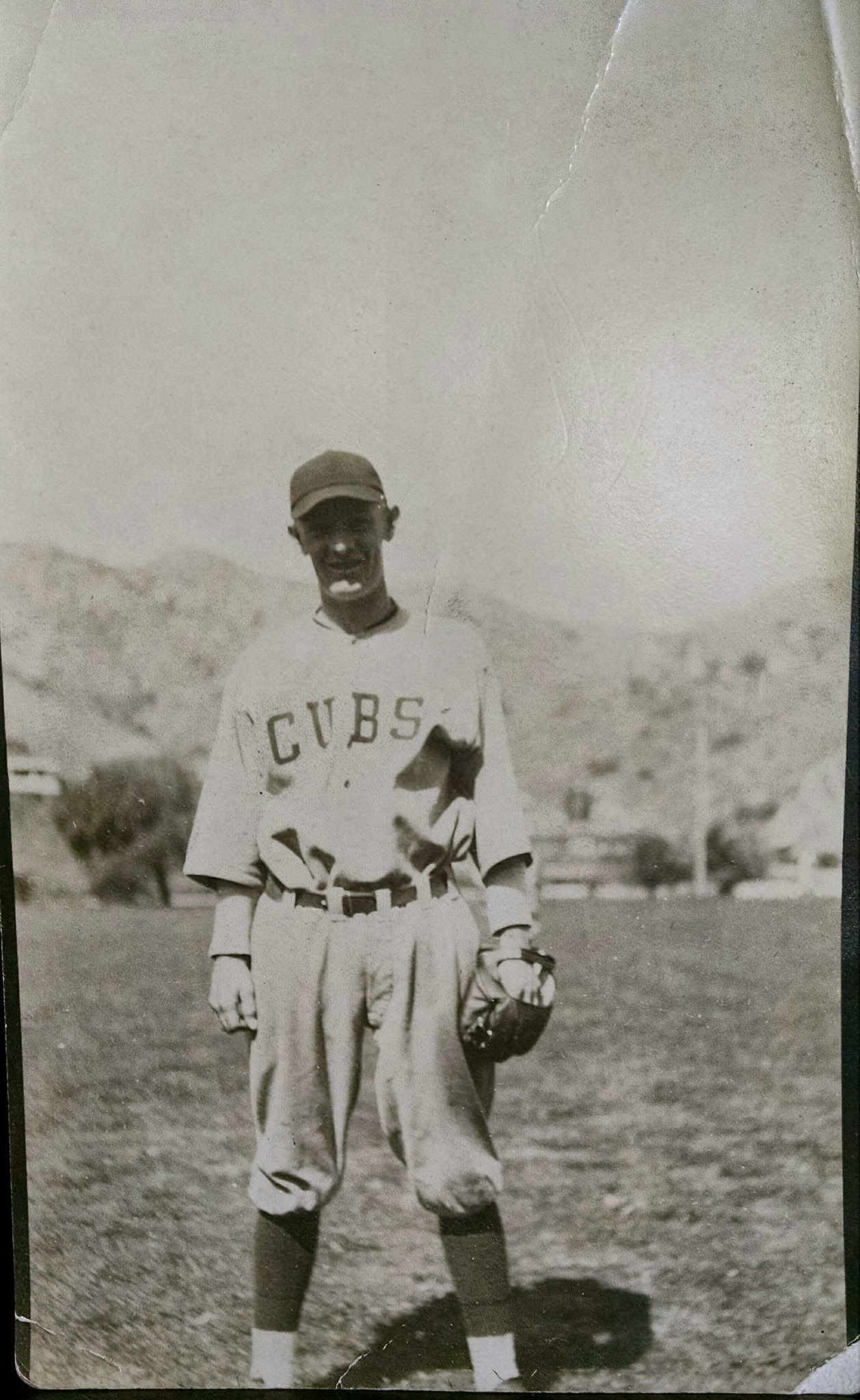
- Tony Kaufmann on Catalina Island during his time with the Cubs
- Pitcher / Outfielder
- Born: December 16, 1900; Chicago, Illinois, U.S.
- Died: June 4, 1982 (aged 81); Elgin, Illinois, U.S.
- Batted: Right Threw: Right

MLB debut
- September 23, 1921, for the Chicago Cubs

Last MLB appearance
- September 23, 1935, for the St. Louis Cardinals

MLB statistics
- Win–loss record: 64–62
- Earned run average: 4.18
- Innings pitched: 1,086 1/3
- Batting average: .220
- Home runs: 9
- Runs batted in: 57
- Stats at Baseball Reference

Teams
- Chicago Cubs (1921–1927); Philadelphia Phillies (1927); St. Louis Cardinals (1927–1928); New York Giants (1929); St. Louis Cardinals (1930–1931; 1935)

Anthony Charles Kaufmann (December 16, 1900 – June 4, 1982) was an American professional baseball player, coach and manager. He played in 260 Major League games, primarily as a pitcher, for the Chicago Cubs (1921–27), Philadelphia Phillies (1927), St. Louis Cardinals (1927–28, 1930–31 and 1935) and New York Giants (1929). The native of Chicago stood 5 feet 11 inches (1.80 m) tall and weighed 165 pounds (75 kg).

Kaufmann led the National League in hit batsmen (11) in 1923 and home runs allowed (21) in 1924.

In 11 seasons and 202 games pitched, he had a 64–62 record, with 123 starts, 71 complete games, nine shutouts, 12 saves, 1,086 1/3 innings pitched, 1,198 hits allowed, 587 runs allowed, 81 home runs allowed, 368 walks, 345 strikeouts, 39 hit batsmen, 15 wild pitches and a 4.18 earned run average. As a competent hitting pitcher, Kaufmann also played 18 games in the outfield during his late-career stints with the Phillies, Giants and Cardinals. In 414 Major League at bats, he collected 91 hits, with 19 doubles and nine home runs, for a batting average of .220.

After his active career, Kaufmann managed in the Cardinals' farm system (1938–42), and scouted (1943–46) and coached (1947–50) for the MLB Redbirds. He died in Elgin, Illinois, at the age of 81.

== See also ==
- List of St. Louis Cardinals coaches
