= 1927 Major League Baseball season =

1927 MLB season
- League: American League (AL); National League (NL)
- Sport: Baseball
- Duration: Regular season: April 12 – October 2, 1927; World Series: October 5–8, 1927
- Games: 154
- Teams: 16 (8 per league)

Regular Season
- Season MVP: AL: Lou Gehrig (NYY); NL: Paul Waner (PIT)
- AL champions: New York Yankees
- AL runners-up: Philadelphia Athletics
- NL champions: Pittsburgh Pirates
- NL runners-up: St. Louis Cardinals

World Series
- Champions: New York Yankees
- Runners-up: Pittsburgh Pirates

MLB seasons
- ← 1926 1928 →

Locations of teams for the 1923–1931 American League seasons
American League
Locations of teams for the 1920–1931 National League seasons
National League

The 1927 major league baseball season began on April 12, 1927. The regular season ended on October 2, with the Pittsburgh Pirates and New York Yankees as the regular season champions of the National League and American League, respectively. The postseason began with Game 1 of the 24th World Series on October 5 and ended with Game 4 on October 8. The Yankees swept the Pirates in four games, capturing their second championship in franchise history, since their previous in 1923. Going into the season, the defending World Series champions were the St. Louis Cardinals from the 1926 season.

The New York Yankees, whose lineup featured Babe Ruth and Lou Gehrig of the famed "Murderers' Row," dominated the American League with 110 wins. No no-hitters were thrown during the season.

This was the sixth of eight seasons that "League Awards", a precursor to the Major League Baseball Most Valuable Player Award (introduced in 1931), were issued.

== Schedule ==
The 1927 schedule consisted of 154 games for all teams in the American League and National League, each of which had eight teams. Each team was scheduled to play 22 games against the other seven teams of their respective league. This continued the format put in place since the 1904 season (except for 1919) and would be used until 1961 in the American League and 1962 in the National League.

Opening Day took place on April 12 with all but the Detroit Tigers and St. Louis Browns playing. The final day of the regular season was on October 2. The World Series took place between October 5 and October 8.

== Rule changes ==
The 1927 season saw the following rule changes:

- A statute of limitations in line with federal and state laws to prevent decades-old accusations of game fixing from surfacing.
- One-year bans for players and managers found to have fixed games or to have bet on games in which the player or manager was not directly involved were implemented.
- A lifetime ban for anyone who bet on a game in which he was directly involved was implemented.

== Teams ==
An asterisk (*) denotes the ballpark a team played the minority of their home games at

League	Team	City	Ballpark	Capacity	Manager
American League	Boston Red Sox	Boston, Massachusetts	Fenway Park	27,000	Bill Carrigan
American League	Chicago White Sox	Chicago, Illinois	Comiskey Park	52,000	Ray Schalk
American League	Cleveland Indians	Cleveland, Ohio	Dunn Field	21,414	Jack McCallister
American League	Detroit Tigers	Detroit, Michigan	Navin Field	30,000	George Moriarty
American League	New York Yankees	New York, New York	Yankee Stadium	82,000	Miller Huggins
American League	Philadelphia Athletics	Philadelphia, Pennsylvania	Shibe Park	27,500	Connie Mack
American League	St. Louis Browns	St. Louis, Missouri	Sportsman's Park	34,023	Dan Howley
American League	Washington Senators	Washington, D.C.	Griffith Stadium	27,000	Bucky Harris
National League	Boston Braves	Boston, Massachusetts	Braves Field	40,000	Dave Bancroft
National League	Brooklyn Robins	New York, New York	Ebbets Field	28,000	Wilbert Robinson
National League	Chicago Cubs	Chicago, Illinois	Wrigley Field	38,396	Joe McCarthy
National League	Cincinnati Reds	Cincinnati, Ohio	Redland Field	26,060	Jack Hendricks
National League	New York Giants	New York, New York	Polo Grounds	55,000	John McGraw
National League	Philadelphia Phillies	Philadelphia, Pennsylvania	Baker Bowl	18,000	Stuffy McInnis
National League	Philadelphia Phillies	Philadelphia, Pennsylvania	Shibe Park*	27,500*	Stuffy McInnis
National League	Pittsburgh Pirates	Pittsburgh, Pennsylvania	Forbes Field	41,000	Donie Bush
National League	St. Louis Cardinals	St. Louis, Missouri	Sportsman's Park	34,023	Bob O'Farrell

== Standings ==
=== American League ===
American League
Team	W	L	Pct.	GB	Home	Road
New York Yankees	110	44	.714	—	57‍–‍19	53‍–‍25
Philadelphia Athletics	91	63	.591	19	50‍–‍27	41‍–‍36
Washington Senators	85	69	.552	25	51‍–‍28	34‍–‍41
Detroit Tigers	82	71	.536	27½	44‍–‍32	38‍–‍39
Chicago White Sox	70	83	.458	39½	38‍–‍37	32‍–‍46
Cleveland Indians	66	87	.431	43½	35‍–‍42	31‍–‍45
St. Louis Browns	59	94	.386	50½	38‍–‍38	21‍–‍56
Boston Red Sox	51	103	.331	59	29‍–‍49	22‍–‍54

=== National League ===
National League
Team	W	L	Pct.	GB	Home	Road
Pittsburgh Pirates	94	60	.610	—	48‍–‍31	46‍–‍29
St. Louis Cardinals	92	61	.601	1½	55‍–‍25	37‍–‍36
New York Giants	92	62	.597	2	49‍–‍25	43‍–‍37
Chicago Cubs	85	68	.556	8½	50‍–‍28	35‍–‍40
Cincinnati Reds	75	78	.490	18½	45‍–‍35	30‍–‍43
Brooklyn Robins	65	88	.425	28½	34‍–‍39	31‍–‍49
Boston Braves	60	94	.390	34	32‍–‍41	28‍–‍53
Philadelphia Phillies	51	103	.331	43	34‍–‍43	17‍–‍60

=== Tie games ===
8 tie games 5 in AL, 3 in NL), which are not factored into winning percentage or games behind (and were often replayed again) occurred throughout the season.

==== American League ====
- Detroit Tigers, 3
- New York Yankees, 1
- Philadelphia Athletics, 1
- St. Louis Browns, 2
- Washington Senators, 3

==== National League ====
- Boston Braves, 1
- Brooklyn Robins, 1
- New York Giants, 1
- Philadelphia Phillies, 1
- Pittsburgh Pirates, 2

== Postseason ==
The postseason began on October 5 and ended on October 8 with the New York Yankees sweeping the Pittsburgh Pirates in the 1927 World Series in four games.

=== Bracket ===
World Series
AL	New York Yankees	4
NL	Pittsburgh Pirates	0

== Managerial changes ==
=== Off-season ===
Team	Former Manager	New Manager
Boston Red Sox	Lee Fohl	Bill Carrigan
Chicago White Sox	Eddie Collins	Ray Schalk
Cleveland Indians	Tris Speaker	Jack McCallister
Detroit Tigers	Ty Cobb	George Moriarty
Philadelphia Phillies	Art Fletcher	Stuffy McInnis
Pittsburgh Pirates	Bill McKechnie	Donie Bush
St. Louis Browns	George Sisler	Dan Howley
St. Louis Cardinals	Rogers Hornsby	Bob O'Farrell

== League leaders ==
=== American League ===
Hitting leaders
Stat	Player	Total
AVG	Harry Heilmann (DET)	.398
OPS	Babe Ruth (NYY)	1.258
HR	Babe Ruth (NYY)	60
RBI	Lou Gehrig (NYY)	173
R	Babe Ruth (NYY)	158
H	Earle Combs (NYY)	231
SB	George Sisler (SLB)	27

Pitching leaders
Stat	Player	Total
W	Waite Hoyt (NYY); Ted Lyons (CWS)	22
L	Slim Harriss (BOS)	21
ERA	Wilcy Moore (NYY)	2.28
K	Lefty Grove (PHA)	174
IP	Ted Lyons (CWS); Tommy Thomas (CWS)	307.2
SV	Wilcy Moore (NYY)	13
WHIP	Garland Braxton (WSH)	1.139

=== National League ===
Hitting leaders
Stat	Player	Total
AVG	Paul Waner (PIT)	.380
OPS	Rogers Hornsby (NYG)	1.035
HR	Cy Williams (PHI); Hack Wilson (CHC)	30
RBI	Paul Waner (PIT)	131
R	Rogers Hornsby (NYG); Paul Waner (PIT)	133
H	Paul Waner (PIT)	237
SB	Frankie Frisch (STL)	48

Pitching leaders
Stat	Player	Total
W	Charlie Root (CHC)	26
L	Jack Scott (PHI)	21
ERA	Ray Kremer (PIT)	2.47
K	Dazzy Vance (BRO)	184
IP	Charlie Root (CHC)	309.0
SV	Bill Sherdel (STL)	6
WHIP	Grover Alexander (STL)	1.116

== Milestones ==
=== Batters ===
==== Cycles ====
- Jim Bottomley (STL):
  - Bottomley hit for his first cycle and fifth in franchise history, on July 15 against the Philadelphia Phillies.
- Cy Williams (PHI):
  - Williams hit for his first cycle and third in franchise history, on August 5 against the Pittsburgh Pirates.

==== Other batting accomplishments ====
- Ty Cobb (PHA):
  - Became the first pitcher to hit home runs prior to turning 20 and after turning 40 years old on May 16, in a 10–8 against the St. Louis Browns.
  - Recorded his 4,000th career hit with a double in the first inning against the Detroit Tigers on July 18. He became the first player to reach this mark.
- Max Carey (BRO):
  - Recorded his 700th career stolen base in the eighth inning against the Chicago Cubs on July 10. He became the sixth player to reach this mark.
- Walter Johnson (BOS):
  - Set an American League record for most career wins at 417 on July 28 in a 12–2 win over the Chicago White Sox in his last career win.
- Babe Ruth (NYY):
  - Became the first player in Major League history to hit 400 home runs with a solo home run in the first inning against the Philadelphia Athletics on September 2.
  - Set a new major-league and American League record for home runs in a season by hitting his 60th home run on September 30 against the Washington Senators. Ruth broke the previous record of 59 home runs set by himself in 1921.

=== Pitching ===
- Jesse Barnes (BRO) / Virgil Barnes (NYG):
  - Became the first brothers in Major League history to pitch against each other on May 3. Virgil and the Giants defeated Jesse and the Robins, 7–6.

=== Miscellaneous ===
- New York Yankees:
  - Played 155 games due to a tie game against the Philadelphia Athletics on April 14, which ended in a 9–9 tie due to darkness falling.
- Chicago Cubs:
  - Set a major league record for most runs scored in the 18th inning, by scoring five runs against the Boston Braves on May 14.
- Philadelphia Phillies:
  - Four pitchers were used as pinch hitters and pinch runners against the Pittsburgh Pirates on July 18. Jack Scott, Clarence Mitchell and Les Sweetland hit, while Tony Kaufmann ran for Scott.

== Awards and honors ==
- League Award: Paul Waner (PIT, National); Lou Gehrig (NYY, American)

== Home field attendance ==
Team name	Wins	%±	Home attendance	%±	Per game
New York Yankees	110	20.9%	1,164,015	13.3%	15,117
Chicago Cubs	85	3.7%	1,159,168	31.0%	14,861
Pittsburgh Pirates	94	11.9%	869,720	8.9%	11,009
New York Giants	92	24.3%	858,190	22.5%	11,597
Detroit Tigers	82	3.8%	773,716	8.7%	9,919
St. Louis Cardinals	92	3.4%	749,340	12.1%	9,367
Brooklyn Robins	65	−8.5%	637,230	−2.1%	8,611
Chicago White Sox	70	−13.6%	614,423	−13.5%	8,192
Philadelphia Athletics	91	9.6%	605,529	−15.3%	7,864
Washington Senators	85	4.9%	528,976	−4.1%	6,696
Cincinnati Reds	75	−13.8%	442,164	−34.3%	5,527
Cleveland Indians	66	−25.0%	373,138	−40.5%	4,846
Philadelphia Phillies	51	−12.1%	305,420	26.9%	3,916
Boston Red Sox	51	10.9%	305,275	7.1%	3,914
Boston Braves	60	−9.1%	288,685	−4.9%	3,901
St. Louis Browns	59	−4.8%	247,879	−12.7%	3,178

== Venues ==
In November 1926, following the conclusion of the previous season, Chicago Cubs owner William Wrigley Jr. renamed Cubs Park to Wrigley Field.

During a Philadelphia Phillies home game against the St. Louis Cardinals at the Baker Bowl on May 14, parts of two sections of the lower deck extension along the right-field line collapsed due to rotted shoring timbers, triggered by an oversize gathering of people, who were seeking shelter from rain. While no one died during the collapse, one individual died of heart failure in the subsequent stampede that injured 50. The game was cut short in the 7th inning following the collapse. In a similar situation to a partial collapse in 1903, the Phillies rented from the Philadelphia Athletics at Shibe Park while repairs were being made to the old structure. The Phillies played 12 home games at Shibe Park, from May 16 to May 28, before eventually returning to the Baker Bowl on June 24 after spending nearly a month on the road.

== See also ==
- 1927 in baseball (Events, Births, Deaths)
