= 1926 New York Giants (MLB) season =

1926 New York Giants
- League: National League
- Ballpark: Polo Grounds
- City: New York City
- Record: 74–77 (.490)
- League place: 5th
- Owners: Charles Stoneham
- Managers: John McGraw

The 1926 New York Giants season was the franchise's 44th season. The team finished in fifth place in the National League with a 74–77 record, 13½ games behind the St. Louis Cardinals.

== Regular season ==
=== Season standings ===
National League
Team	W	L	Pct.	GB	Home	Road
St. Louis Cardinals	89	65	.578	—	47‍–‍30	42‍–‍35
Cincinnati Reds	87	67	.565	2	53‍–‍23	34‍–‍44
Pittsburgh Pirates	84	69	.549	4½	49‍–‍28	35‍–‍41
Chicago Cubs	82	72	.532	7	49‍–‍28	33‍–‍44
New York Giants	74	77	.490	13½	43‍–‍33	31‍–‍44
Brooklyn Robins	71	82	.464	17½	38‍–‍38	33‍–‍44
Boston Braves	66	86	.434	22	43‍–‍34	23‍–‍52
Philadelphia Phillies	58	93	.384	29½	33‍–‍42	25‍–‍51

=== Record vs. opponents ===
1926 National League record Sources:
Team	BSN	BRO	CHC	CIN	NYG	PHI	PIT	STL
Boston	—	6–15	12–10	12–10–1	12–10	7–15	10–11	7–15
Brooklyn	15–6	—	14–8	4–18	9–13	13–9	9–13–2	7–15
Chicago	10–12	8–14	—	13–9–1	14–8	16–6	10–12	11–11
Cincinnati	10–12–1	18–4	9–13–1	—	7–15	16–6–1	13–9	14–8
New York	10–12	13–9	8–14	15–7	—	12–7	6–16	10–12
Philadelphia	15–7	9–13	6–16	6–16–1	7–12	—	8–14	7–15
Pittsburgh	11–10	13–9–2	12–10	9–13	16–6	14–8	—	9–13–2
St. Louis	15–7	15–7	11–11	8–14	12–10	15–7	13–9–2	—

=== Opening Day lineup ===
- Heinie Groh 3B
- Frankie Frisch 2B
- Ross Youngs RF
- Irish Meusel RF
- High Pockets Kelly 1B
- Ty Tyson CF
- Travis Jackson SS
- Frank Snyder C
- Virgil Barnes P

=== Notable transactions ===
- June 14, 1926: Billy Southworth was traded by the Giants to the St. Louis Cardinals for Heinie Mueller.

=== Roster ===
1926 New York Giants
Roster
Pitchers: Virgil Barnes; Jack Bentley; Chick Davies; Freddie Fitzsimmons; Kent Greenfield; Tim McNamara; Hugh McQuillan; Art Nehf; Joe Poetz; Ned Porter; Jimmy Ring; Jack Scott; Al Smith; Jack Wisner	Catchers: Jim Boyle; Jack Cummings; Paul Florence; Jim Hamby; Grover Hartley; Hugh McMullen; Frank Snyder; Infielders: Andy Cohen; Doc Farrell; Frankie Frisch; Heinie Groh; Travis Jackson; George Kelly; Freddie Lindstrom; Scottie Slayback; Bill Terry; Fresco Thompson	Outfielders: Blackie Carter; Jimmy Johnston; Irish Meusel; Al Moore; Heinie Mueller; Mel Ott; Mike Smith; Billy Southworth; Ty Tyson; Ross Youngs; Other batters: Joe Connell; Pete Cote	Manager: John McGraw; Coaches: Roger Bresnahan

== Player stats ==
=== Batting ===
==== Starters by position ====
Note: Pos = Position; G = Games played; AB = At bats; H = Hits; Avg. = Batting average; HR = Home runs; RBI = Runs batted in

Pos	Player	G	AB	H	Avg.	HR	RBI
C	Paul Florence	76	188	43	.229	2	14
1B	George Kelly	136	499	151	.303	13	80
2B	Frankie Frisch	135	545	171	.314	5	44
SS	Travis Jackson	111	385	126	.327	8	51
3B	Freddie Lindstrom	140	543	164	.302	9	76
OF	Ross Youngs	95	372	114	.306	4	43
OF	Ty Tyson	97	335	98	.293	3	35
OF	Irish Meusel	129	449	131	.292	6	65

==== Other batters ====
Note: G = Games played; AB = At bats; H = Hits; Avg. = Batting average; HR = Home runs; RBI = Runs batted in

Player	G	AB	H	Avg.	HR	RBI
Heinie Mueller	85	305	76	.249	4	29
Bill Terry	98	225	65	.289	5	43
Doc Farrell	67	171	49	.287	2	23
Frank Snyder	55	148	32	.216	5	16
Billy Southworth	36	116	38	.328	5	30
Hugh McMullen	57	91	17	.187	0	6
Al Moore	28	81	18	.222	0	10
Jimmy Johnston	37	69	16	.232	0	5
Mel Ott	35	60	23	.383	0	4
Heinie Groh	12	35	8	.229	0	3
Andy Cohen	32	35	9	.257	0	8
Grover Hartley	13	21	1	.048	0	0
Blackie Carter	5	17	4	.235	1	1
Jack Cummings	7	16	5	.313	0	4
Fresco Thompson	2	8	5	.625	0	1
Scottie Slayback	2	8	0	.000	0	0
Mike Smith	4	7	1	.143	0	0
Jim Hamby	1	3	0	.000	0	0
Joe Connell	2	1	0	.000	0	0
Pete Cote	2	1	0	.000	0	0
Jimmy Boyle	1	0	0	----	0	0

=== Pitching ===
==== Starting pitchers ====
Note: G = Games pitched; IP = Innings pitched; W = Wins; L = Losses; ERA = Earned run average; SO = Strikeouts

Player	G	IP	W	L	ERA	SO
Kent Greenfield	39	222.2	13	12	3.96	74
Freddie Fitzsimmons	37	219.0	14	10	2.88	48
Virgil Barnes	31	185.0	8	13	2.87	54
Hugh McQuillan	33	167.0	11	10	3.72	47

==== Other pitchers ====
Note: G = Games pitched; IP = Innings pitched; W = Wins; L = Losses; ERA = Earned run average; SO = Strikeouts

Player	G	IP	W	L	ERA	SO
Jack Scott	50	226.0	13	15	4.34	82
Jimmy Ring	39	183.1	11	10	4.57	76
Jack Wisner	5	28.0	2	2	3.54	5
Joe Poetz	2	8.0	0	1	3.38	0

==== Relief pitchers ====
Note: G = Games pitched; W = Wins; L = Losses; SV = Saves; ERA = Earned run average; SO = Strikeouts

Player	G	W	L	SV	ERA	SO
Chick Davies	38	2	4	6	3.94	27
Tim McNamara	6	0	0	0	9.00	4
Ned Porter	2	0	0	0	4.50	1
Art Nehf	2	0	0	0	10.80	0
Jack Bentley	1	0	0	0	0.00	1
Al Smith	1	0	0	0	9.00	0
