= List of Major League Baseball players (Sf–So) =

The following is a list of Major League Baseball players, retired or active.

== Sh through So ==
Name	Debut	Final game	Position	Teams	Ref
Adam Shabala	June 16, 2005	July 20, 2005	Outfielder	San Francisco Giants	
Brian Shackelford	June 26, 2005	September 20, 2006	Pitcher	Cincinnati Reds	
Orator Shafer	May 23, 1874	September 13, 1890	Outfielder	Hartford Dark Blues, New York Mutuals, Philadelphia Athletics (NL), Louisville Grays, Indianapolis Blues, Chicago White Stockings, Cleveland Blues (NL), Buffalo Bisons, St. Louis Maroons, Philadelphia Athletics (AA)	
Ralph Shafer	July 25, 1914	July 25, 1914	Pinch runner	Pittsburgh Pirates	
Taylor Shafer	April 24, 1884	September 16, 1890	Utility player	Altoona Mountain City, Kansas City Cowboys (UA), Baltimore Monumentals, Philadelphia Athletics (AA)	
Tillie Shafer	April 24, 1909	October 4, 1913	Third baseman	New York Giants	
Shaffer, first name unknown	September 15, 1875	September 15, 1875	Outfielder	Brooklyn Atlantics	
John Shaffer	September 13, 1886	June 30, 1887	Pitcher	New York Metropolitans	
Gus Shallix	June 22, 1884	June 2, 1885	Pitcher	Cincinnati Red Stockings (AA)	
Art Shamsky	April 17, 1965	July 18, 1972	Outfielder	Cincinnati Reds, New York Mets, Chicago Cubs, Oakland Athletics	
Warren Shanabrook	August 13, 1906	August 13, 1906	Third baseman	Washington Senators	
Greg Shanahan	September 7, 1973	September 30, 1974	Pitcher	Los Angeles Dodgers	
Jim Shanley	May 3, 1876	May 4, 1876	Outfielder	New York Mutuals	
Wally Shaner	May 4, 1923	June 14, 1929	Outfielder	Cleveland Indians, Boston Red Sox, Cincinnati Reds	
Harvey Shank	May 16, 1970	May 16, 1970	Pitcher	California Angels	
Howie Shanks	May 9, 1912	October 3, 1925	Utility player	Washington Senators, Boston Red Sox, New York Yankees	
Doc Shanley	September 15. 1912	September 24, 1912	Shortstop	St. Louis Browns	
Bill Shanner	October 1, 1920	October 1, 1920	Pitcher	Philadelphia Athletics	
Dan Shannon	April 17, 1889	September 16, 1891	Second baseman	Louisville Colonels, Philadelphia Quakers (PL), New York Giants (PL), Washington Statesmen	
Frank Shannon	October 1, 1892	June 20, 1896	Shortstop	Washington Senators (1891–99), Louisville Colonels	
Joe Shannon	June 30, 1915	October 7, 1915	Outfielder	Boston Braves	
Mike Shannon	September 11, 1962	August 12, 1970	Utility player	St. Louis Cardinals	
Owen Shannon	September 6, 1903	August 24, 1907	Catcher	St. Louis Browns, Washington Senators	
Red Shannon	October 7, 1915	June 2, 1926	Utility infielder	Boston Braves, Philadelphia Athletics, Boston Red Sox, Washington Senators, Chicago Cubs	
Spike Shannon	April 15, 1904	September 30, 1908	Outfielder	St. Louis Cardinals, New York Giants, Pittsburgh Pirates	
Wally Shannon	July 9, 1959	May 26, 1960	Utility infielder	St. Louis Cardinals	
Billy Shantz	April 13, 1954	June 29, 1960	Catcher	Philadelphia/Kansas City Athletics, New York Yankees	
Bobby Shantz	May 1, 1949	September 29, 1964	Pitcher	Philadelphia/Kansas City Athletics, New York Yankees, Pittsburgh Pirates, Houston Colt .45s, St. Louis Cardinals, Chicago Cubs, Philadelphia Phillies	
Ralph Sharman	September 10, 1917	October 3, 1917	Outfielder	Philadelphia Athletics	
Dick Sharon	May 13, 1973	September 28, 1975	Outfielder	Detroit Tigers, San Diego Padres	
Bill Sharp	May 26, 1973	September 17, 1976	Outfielder	Chicago White Sox, Milwaukee Brewers	
Bud Sharpe	April 14, 1905	September 24, 1910	First baseman	Boston Beaneaters, Boston Doves, Pittsburgh Pirates	
Mike Sharperson	April 6, 1987	July 15, 1995	Third baseman	Toronto Blue Jays, Los Angeles Dodgers, Atlanta Braves	
Josh Sharpless	August 1, 2006		Pitcher	Pittsburgh Pirates	
George Sharrott	July 27, 1893	May 4, 1894	Pitcher	Brooklyn Grooms	
Jack Sharrott	April 22, 1890	September 30, 1893	Pitcher	New York Giants, Philadelphia Phillies	
Shag Shaughnessy	April 17, 1905	June 20, 1908	Outfielder	Washington Senators, Philadelphia Athletics	
Joe Shaute	July 6, 1922	May 24, 1934	Pitcher	Cleveland Indians, Brooklyn Dodgers, Cincinnati Reds	
Jon Shave	May 15, 1993	October 3, 1999	Utility infielder	Texas Rangers, Minnesota Twins	
Jeff Shaver	July 6, 1988	July 6, 1988	Pitcher	Oakland Athletics	
Al Shaw (C)	June 8, 1901	September 13, 1909	Catcher	Detroit Tigers, Boston Americans, Chicago White Sox, Boston Doves	
Al Shaw (OF)	September 28, 1907	October 3, 1915	Outfielder	St. Louis Cardinals, Brooklyn Tip-Tops, Kansas City Packers	
Ben Shaw	April 11, 1917	August 27, 1918	First baseman	Pittsburgh Pirates	
Bob Shaw	August 11, 1957	September 11, 1967	Pitcher	Detroit Tigers, Chicago White Sox, Kansas City Athletics, Milwaukee Braves, San Francisco Giants, New York Mets, Chicago Cubs	
Bryan Shaw	June 10, 2011		Pitcher	Arizona Diamondbacks	
Don Shaw	April 11, 1967	May 19, 1972	Pitcher	New York Mets, Montreal Expos, St. Louis Cardinals, Oakland Athletics	
Dupee Shaw	June 18, 1883	July 17, 1888	Pitcher	Detroit Wolverines, Boston Reds (UA), Providence Grays, Washington Nationals (1886–1889)	
Hunky Shaw	May 16, 1908	May 16, 1908	Pinch hitter	Pittsburgh Pirates	
Jeff Shaw	April 30, 1990	October 6, 2001	Pitcher	Cleveland Indians, Montreal Expos, Chicago White Sox, Cincinnati Reds, Los Angeles Dodgers	
Jim Shaw	September 15, 1913	July 13, 1921	Pitcher	Washington Senators	
Sam Shaw	May 3, 1888	June 16, 1893	Pitcher	Baltimore Orioles (19th century), Chicago Colts	
Bob Shawkey	July 16, 1913	September 29, 1927	Pitcher	Philadelphia Athletics, New York Yankees	
Danny Shay	April 30, 1901	September 10, 1907	Shortstop	Cleveland Blues (AL), St. Louis Cardinals, New York Giants	
Marty Shay	September 16, 1916	September 2, 1924	Second baseman	Chicago Cubs, Boston Braves	
Gerry Shea	October 1, 1905	October 3, 1905	Catcher	St. Louis Cardinals	
John Shea	June 30, 1928	June 30, 1928	Pitcher	Boston Red Sox	
Merv Shea	April 23, 1927	August 19, 1944	Catcher	Detroit Tigers, Boston Red Sox, St. Louis Browns, Chicago White Sox, Brooklyn Dodgers, Philadelphia Phillies	
Mike Shea	April 20, 1887	April 26, 1887	Pitcher	Cincinnati Red Stockings (AA)	
Nap Shea	September 11, 1902	September 15, 1902	Catcher	Philadelphia Phillies	
Red Shea	May 6, 1918	June 9, 1922	Pitcher	Philadelphia Athletics, New York Giants	
Spec Shea	April 19, 1947	August 27, 1955	Pitcher	New York Yankees, Washington Senators	
Steve Shea	July 14, 1968	May 31, 1969	Pitcher	Houston Astros, Montreal Expos	
Danny Sheaffer	April 9, 1987	September 27, 1997	Catcher	Boston Red Sox, Cleveland Indians, Colorado Rockies, St. Louis Cardinals	
Al Shealy	April 13, 1928	September 3, 1930	Pitcher	New York Yankees, Chicago Cubs	
Ryan Shealy	June 14, 2005		First baseman	Colorado Rockies, Kansas City Royals, Boston Red Sox	
Dave Shean	September 10, 1906	July 17, 1919	Second baseman	Philadelphia Athletics, Philadelphia Phillies, Boston Doves, Chicago Cubs, Boston Braves, Cincinnati Reds, Boston Red Sox	
Ray Shearer	September 18, 1957	September 29, 1957	Outfielder	Milwaukee Braves	
Tom Shearn	August 26, 2007	September 26, 2007	Pitcher	Cincinnati Reds	
John Shearon	July 28, 1891	May 9, 1896	Outfielder	Cleveland Spiders	
George Shears	April 24, 1912	June 20, 1912	Pitcher	New York Highlanders	
Jimmy Sheckard	September 14, 1897	September 28, 1914	Outfielder	Brooklyn Bridegrooms, Baltimore Orioles (19th century), Brooklyn Superbas, Baltimore Orioles, Chicago Cubs, St. Louis Cardinals, Cincinnati Reds	
Biff Sheehan	July 22, 1895	May 10, 1896	Outfielder	St. Louis Browns (1882–1900)	
Dan Sheahan	April 19, 1884	August 23, 1884	Outfielder	Washington Nationals (UA), Wilmington Quicksteps	
Jack Sheehan	September 11, 1920	May 16, 1921	Utility infielder	Brooklyn Robins	
Jim Sheehan	September 26, 1936	September 26, 1936	Catcher	New York Giants	
Tom Sheehan	July 14, 1915	May 27, 1926	Pitcher	Philadelphia Athletics, New York Yankees, Cincinnati Reds, Pittsburgh Pirates	
Tommy Sheehan	August 2, 1900	October 7, 1908	Third baseman	New York Giants, Pittsburgh Pirates, Brooklyn Superbas	
Bud Sheely	July 26, 1951	September 13, 1953	Catcher	Chicago White Sox	
Earl Sheely	April 14, 1921	September 27, 1931	First baseman	Chicago White Sox, Pittsburgh Pirates, Boston Braves	
Chuck Sheerin	April 21, 1936	September 27, 1936	Utility infielder	Philadelphia Phillies	
Andy Sheets	April 22, 1996	September 25, 2002	Shortstop	Seattle Mariners, San Diego Padres, Anaheim Angels, Boston Red Sox, Tampa Bay Devil Rays	
Ben Sheets	April 5, 2001		Pitcher	Milwaukee Brewers, Oakland Athletics	
Larry Sheets	September 18, 1984	October 1, 1993	Outfielder	Baltimore Orioles, Detroit Tigers, Seattle Mariners	
Gary Sheffield	September 3, 1988		Outfielder	Milwaukee Brewers, San Diego Padres, Florida Marlins, Los Angeles Dodgers, Atlanta Braves, New York Yankees, Detroit Tigers, New York Mets	
John Shelby	September 15, 1981	August 11, 1991	Outfielder	Baltimore Orioles, Los Angeles Dodgers, Detroit Tigers	
Bob Sheldon	April 10, 1974	July 17, 1977	Second baseman	Milwaukee Brewers	
Rollie Sheldon	April 23, 1961	September 25, 1966	Pitcher	New York Yankees, Kansas City Athletics, Boston Red Sox	
Scott Sheldon	May 18, 1997	October 5, 2001	Utility infielder	Oakland Athletics, Texas Rangers	
Steven Shell	June 22, 2008		Pitcher	Washington Nationals	
Frank Shellenback	May 8, 1918	July 5, 1919	Pitcher	Chicago White Sox	
Jim Shellenback	September 15, 1966	September 21, 1977	Pitcher	Pittsburgh Pirates, Washington Senators (1961–1971), Texas Rangers, Minnesota Twins	
Hugh Shelley	June 25, 1935	September 29, 1935	Outfielder	Detroit Tigers	
Ben Shelton	June 16, 1993	July 25, 1993	Outfielder	Pittsburgh Pirates	
Chris Shelton	April 15, 2004		First baseman	Detroit Tigers, Texas Rangers, Seattle Mariners	
Skeeter Shelton	August 25, 1915	September 1, 1915	Outfielder	New York Yankees	
Steve Shemo	April 18, 1944	July 16, 1945	Second baseman	Boston Braves	
Bert Shepard	August 4, 1945	August 4, 1945	Pitcher	Washington Senators	
Jack Shepard	June 19, 1953	September 30, 1956	Catcher	Pittsburgh Pirates	
Ray Shepardson	September 19, 1924	September 24, 1924	Catcher	St. Louis Cardinals	
Keith Shepherd	September 6, 1992	August 4, 1996	Pitcher	Philadelphia Phillies, Colorado Rockies, Boston Red Sox, Baltimore Orioles	
Ron Shepherd	September 5, 1984	October 5, 1986	Outfielder	Toronto Blue Jays	
John Sheppard	June 27, 1873	July 11, 1873	Outfielder	Baltimore Marylands	
Bill Sherdel	April 22, 1918	June 11, 1932	Pitcher	St. Louis Cardinals, Boston Braves	
Roy Sherid	May 11, 1929	June 21, 1931	Pitcher	New York Yankees	
Sheridan, first name unknown	October 9, 1875	October 9, 1875	Outfielder	Brooklyn Atlantics	
Neill Sheridan	September 19, 1948	September 26, 1948	Pinch hitter	Boston Red Sox	
Pat Sheridan	September 16, 1981	October 5, 1991	Outfielder	Kansas City Royals, Detroit Tigers, San Francisco Giants, New York Yankees	
Red Sheridan	July 3, 1918	October 1, 1920	Utility infielder	Brooklyn Robins	
Ed Sherling	August 13, 1924	September 17, 1924	Pinch hitter	Philadelphia Athletics	
Monk Sherlock	April 20, 1930	September 28, 1930	First baseman	Philadelphia Phillies	
Vince Sherlock	September 18, 1935	September 29, 1935	Second baseman	Brooklyn Dodgers	
Dan Sherman	June 4, 1914	June 4, 1914	Pitcher	Chicago Chi-Feds	
Darrell Sherman	April 8, 1993	May 22, 1993	Outfielder	San Diego Padres	
Joe Sherman	September 24, 1915	September 30, 1915	Pitcher	Philadelphia Athletics	
Dennis Sherrill	September 4, 1978	June 28, 1980	Utility infielder	New York Yankees	
George Sherrill	July 16, 2004		Pitcher	Seattle Mariners, Baltimore Orioles, Los Angeles Dodgers, Atlanta Braves	
Tim Sherrill	August 14, 1990	June 16, 1991	Pitcher	St. Louis Cardinals	
Fred Sherry	April 25, 1911	June 28, 1911	Pitcher	Washington Senators	
Larry Sherry	April 17, 1958	July 7, 1968	Pitcher	Los Angeles Dodgers, Detroit Tigers, Houston Astros, California Angels	
Norm Sherry	April 12, 1959	September 26, 1963	Catcher	Los Angeles Dodgers, New York Mets	
Barry Shetrone	July 27, 1959	June 7, 1963	Outfielder	Baltimore Orioles, Washington Senators (1961–1971)	
John Shetzline	May 2, 1882	September 30, 1882	Third baseman	Baltimore Orioles (19th century)	
Jimmy Shevlin	June 29, 1930	July 25, 1934	First baseman	Detroit Tigers, Cincinnati Reds	
Ben Shields	April 17, 1924	May 23, 1931	Pitcher	New York Yankees, Boston Red Sox, Philadelphia Phillies	
Charlie Shields	April 23, 1902	June 10, 1907	Pitcher	Baltimore Orioles (1901–02), St. Louis Browns, St. Louis Cardinals	
James Shields	May 31, 2006		Pitcher	Tampa Bay Devil Rays/Rays	
Pete Shields	April 14, 1915	May 16, 1915	First baseman	Cleveland Indians	
Scot Shields	May 26, 2001		Pitching	Anaheim Angels/Los Angeles Angels of Anaheim	
Steve Shields	June 1, 1985	June 19, 1989	Pitcher	Atlanta Braves, Kansas City Royals, Seattle Mariners, New York Yankees, Minnesota Twins	
Tommy Shields	July 25, 1992	October 3, 1993	Utility infielder	Baltimore Orioles, Chicago Cubs	
Vince Shields	September 20, 1924	September 25, 1924	Pitcher	St. Louis Cardinals	
Jason Shiell	September 8, 2002	August 5, 2006	Pitcher	San Diego Padres, Boston Red Sox, Atlanta Braves	
Garland Shifflett	August 22, 1957	June 26, 1964	Pitcher	Washington Senators, Minnesota Twins	
Steve Shifflett	July 3, 1992	October 4, 1992	Pitcher	Kansas City Royals	
Jim Shilling	April 21, 1939	September 30, 1939	Second baseman	Cleveland Indians, Philadelphia Phillies	
Zak Shinall	May 12, 1993	May 12, 1993	Pitcher	Seattle Mariners	
Ginger Shinault	July 4, 1921	August 1, 1922	Catcher	Cleveland Indians	
Billy Shindle	October 5, 1886	September 17, 1898	Third baseman	Detroit Wolverines, Baltimore Orioles (19th century), Philadelphia Quakers (PL), Philadelphia Phillies, Brooklyn Grooms/Bridegrooms	
Razor Shines	September 9, 1983	May 14, 1987	First baseman	Montreal Expos	
Tsuyoshi Shinjo	April 3, 2001	June 27, 2003	Outfielder	New York Mets, San Francisco Giants	
Ralph Shinners	April 12, 1922	September 23, 1925	Outfielder	New York Giants, San Francisco Giants	
Tim Shinnick	April 19, 1890	October 4, 1891	Second baseman	Louisville Colonels	
Dave Shipanoff	August 10, 1985	October 5, 1985	Pitcher	Philadelphia Phillies	
Bill Shipke	April 23, 1906	May 13, 1909	Third baseman	Cleveland Naps, Washington Senators	
Craig Shipley	June 22, 1986	September 25, 1998	Utility infielder	Los Angeles Dodgers, New York Mets, San Diego Padres, Houston Astros, Anaheim Angels	
Joe Shipley	July 14, 1958	July 23, 1963	Pitcher	San Francisco Giants, Chicago White Sox	
Art Shires	August 20, 1928	July 31, 1932	First baseman	Chicago White Sox, Washington Senators, Boston Braves	
Duke Shirey	September 28, 1920	October 3, 1920	Pitcher	Washington Senators	
Bart Shirley	September 14, 1964	September 29, 1968	Utility infielder	Los Angeles Dodgers, New York Mets	
Bob Shirley	April 10, 1977	June 21, 1987	Pitcher	San Diego Padres, St. Louis Cardinals, Cincinnati Reds, New York Yankees, Kansas City Royals	
Mule Shirley	May 6, 1924	July 12, 1925	First baseman	Washington Senators	
Steve Shirley	June 21, 1982	July 30, 1982	Pitcher	Los Angeles Dodgers	
Tex Shirley	September 6, 1941	September 21, 1946	Pitcher	Philadelphia Athletics, St. Louis Browns	
Ivey Shiver	April 14, 1931	May 13, 1934	Outfielder	Detroit Tigers, Cincinnati Reds	
George Shoch	September 10, 1886	October 2, 1897	Utility player	Washington Nationals (1886–1889), Milwaukee Brewers (AA), Baltimore Orioles (19th century), Brooklyn Grooms/Bridegrooms	
Urban Shocker	April 24, 1916	May 30, 1928	Pitcher	New York Yankees, St. Louis Browns	
Costen Shockley	July 17, 1964	June 7, 1965	First baseman	Philadelphia Phillies, California Angels	
Charlie Shoemaker	September 9, 1961	July 26, 1964	Second baseman	Kansas City Athletics	
Milt Shoffner	July 20, 1929	September 22, 1940	Pitcher	Cleveland Indians, Boston Bees, Cincinnati Reds	
Strick Shofner	April 19, 1947	April 29, 1947	Third baseman	Boston Red Sox	
Eddie Shokes	June 9, 1941	September 29, 1946	First baseman	Cincinnati Reds	
Ray Shook	April 16, 1916	April 16, 1916	Pinch runner	Chicago White Sox	
Ron Shoop	August 22, 1959	September 27, 1959	Catcher	Detroit Tigers	
Tom Shopay	September 17, 1967	September 30, 1977	Outfielder	New York Yankees, Baltimore Orioles	
Kelly Shoppach	May 28, 2005		Catcher	Boston Red Sox, Cleveland Indians, Tampa Bay Rays	
Ernie Shore	June 20, 1912	August 22, 1920	Pitcher	New York Giants, Boston Red Sox, New York Yankees	
Ray Shore	September 21, 1946	July 4, 1949	Pitcher	St. Louis Browns	
Bill Shores	April 11, 1928	September 20, 1936	Pitcher	Philadelphia White Sox, New York Giants, Chicago White Sox	
Bill Short	April 23, 1960	June 13, 1969	Pitcher	New York Yankees, Baltimore Orioles, Boston Red Sox, Pittsburgh Pirates, New York Mets, Cincinnati Reds	
Chris Short	April 19, 1959	September 18, 1973	Pitcher	Philadelphia Phillies, Milwaukee Brewers	
Dave Short	September 16, 1940	April 29, 1941	Outfielder	Chicago White Sox	
Rick Short	June 10, 2005	September 23, 2005	Second baseman	Washington Nationals	
Chick Shorten	September 22, 1915	September 24, 1924	Outfielder	Boston Red Sox, Detroit Tigers, St. Louis Browns, Cincinnati Reds	
Burt Shotton	September 13, 1909	April 21, 1923	Outfielder	St. Louis Browns, Washington Senators, St. Louis Cardinals	
Clyde Shoun	August 7, 1935	July 19, 1949	Pitcher	Chicago Cubs, St. Louis Cardinals, Cincinnati Reds, Boston Braves, Chicago White Sox	
John Shoupe	May 3, 1879	May 28, 1884	Shortstop	Troy Trojans, St. Louis Brown Stockings (AA), Washington Nationals (UA)	
Brian Shouse	July 31, 1993		Pitcher	Pittsburgh Pirates, Boston Red Sox, Kansas City Royals, Texas Rangers, Milwaukee Brewers, Tampa Bay Rays	
John Shovlin	June 21, 1911	May 12, 1920	Second baseman	Pittsburgh Pirates, St. Louis Browns	
Eric Show	September 2, 1981	September 30, 1991	Pitcher	San Diego Padres, Oakland Athletics	
Lev Shreve	May 2, 1887	September 27, 1889	Pitcher	Baltimore Orioles, Indianapolis Hoosiers (NL)	
Harry Shriver	April 14, 1922	April 20, 1923	Pitcher	Brooklyn Robins	
George Shuba	July 2, 1948	September 25, 1955	Outfielder	Brooklyn Dodgers	
J. B. Shuck	August 5, 2011		Outfielder	Houston Astros	
Paul Shuey	May 8, 1994	August 26, 2007	Pitcher	Cleveland Indians, Los Angeles Dodgers, Baltimore Orioles	
Frank Shugart	August 23, 1890	September 27, 1901	Shortstop	Chicago Pirates, Pittsburgh Pirates, St. Louis Cardinals, Louisville Colonels, Philadelphia Phillies, Chicago White Stockings (AL)	
Toots Shultz	May 5, 1911	September 13, 1912	Pitcher	Philadelphia Phillies	
Anthony Shumaker	July 23, 1999	October 2, 1999	Pitcher	Philadelphia Phillies	
Harry Shuman	September 14, 1942	September 26, 1944	Pitcher	Pittsburgh Pirates, Philadelphia Phillies	
Terry Shumpert	May 1, 1990	September 28, 2003	Second baseman	Kansas City Royals, Boston Red Sox, Chicago Cubs, San Diego Padres, Colorado Rockies, Tampa Bay Devil Rays	
Vince Shupe	July 7, 1945	September 30, 1945	First baseman	Boston Braves	
Ed Sicking	August 26, 1916	May 3, 1927	Utility infielder	Chicago Cubs, New York Giants, Philadelphia Phillies, Cincinnati Reds, Pittsburgh Pirates	
Joe Siddall	July 28, 1993	September 26, 1998	Catcher	Montreal Expos, Florida Marlins, Detroit Tigers	
Norm Siebern	June 15, 1956	July 30, 1968	First baseman	New York Yankees, Kansas City Athletics, Baltimore Orioles, California Angels, San Francisco Giants, Boston Red Sox	
Dick Siebert	September 7, 1932	September 23, 1945	First baseman	Brooklyn Dodgers, St. Louis Cardinals, Philadelphia Athletics	
Paul Siebert	September 7, 1974	September 24, 1978	Pitcher	Houston Astros, San Diego Padres, New York Mets	
Sonny Siebert	April 26, 1964	September 25, 1975	Pitcher	Cleveland Indians, Boston Red Sox, Texas Rangers, St. Louis Cardinals, San Diego Padres, Oakland Athletics	
Dwight Siebler	August 26, 1963	April 30, 1967	Pitcher	Minnesota Twins	
Fred Siefke	May 2, 1890	June 1, 1890	Third baseman	Brooklyn Gladiators	
Fred Siegel	June 9, 1884	June 24, 1884	Third baseman	Philadelphia Keystones	
Johnny Siegle	September 15, 1905	October 7, 1906	Outfielder	Cincinnati Reds	
Oscar Siemer	May 20, 1925	September 18, 1926	Catcher	Boston Braves	
Candy Sierra	April 6, 1988	June 10, 1988	Pitcher	San Diego Padres, Cincinnati Reds	
Rubén Sierra	June 1, 1986	July 9, 2006	Outfielder	Texas Rangers, Oakland Athletics, New York Yankees, Detroit Tigers, Cincinnati Reds, Toronto Blue Jays, Chicago White Sox, Seattle Mariners, Minnesota Twins	
Ed Siever	April 26, 1901	June 18, 1908	Pitcher	Detroit Tigers, St. Louis Browns	
Roy Sievers	April 21, 1949	May 9, 1965	Utility player	St. Louis Browns, Washington Senators, Chicago White Sox, Philadelphia Phillies, Washington Senators (1961–1971)	
Frank Siffell	June 14, 1884	September 16, 1885	Catcher	Philadelphia Athletics (AA)	
Frank Sigafoos	September 3, 1926	May 30, 1931	Utility infielder	Philadelphia Athletics, Detroit Tigers, Chicago White Sox, Cincinnati Reds	
Paddy Siglin	September 12, 1914	September 30, 1916	Second baseman	Pittsburgh Pirates	
Tripp Sigman	September 18, 1929	August 28, 1930	Outfielder	Philadelphia Phillies	
Walter Signer	September 18, 1943	July 22, 1945	Pitcher	Chicago Cubs	
Seth Sigsby	June 27, 1893	June 27, 1893	Pitcher	New York Giants	
Brian Sikorski	August 16, 2000	September 29, 2006	Pitcher	Texas Rangers, San Diego Padres, Cleveland Indians	
Eddie Silber	September 3, 1937	April 30, 1939	Outfielder	St. Louis Browns	
Ed Silch	April 29, 1888	July 8, 1888	Outfielder	Brooklyn Bridegrooms	
Carlos Silva	April 1, 2002		Pitcher	Philadelphia Phillies, Minnesota Twins, Seattle Mariners, Chicago Cubs	
Danny Silva	August 11, 1919	August 11, 1919	Third baseman	Washington Senators	
José Silva	September 10, 1996	September 28, 2002	Pitcher	Toronto Blue Jays, Pittsburgh Pirates, Cincinnati Reds	
Walter Silva	April 8, 2009		Pitcher	San Diego Padres	
Al Silvera	June 12, 1955	May 8, 1956	Outfielder	Cincinnati Redlegs	
Charlie Silvera	September 29, 1948	September 28, 1957	Catcher	New York Yankees, Chicago Cubs	
Luis Silverio	September 9, 1978	September 30, 1978	Outfielder	Kansas City Royals	
Tom Silverio	April 30, 1970	May 15, 1972	Outfielder	California Angels	
Dave Silvestri	April 27, 1992	May 16, 1999	Utility infielder	New York Yankees, Montreal Expos, Texas Rangers, Tampa Bay Devil Rays, Anaheim Angels	
Ken Silvestri	April 18, 1939	July 31, 1951	Catcher	Chicago White Sox, New York Yankees, Philadelphia Phillies	
Al Sima	June 28, 1950	September 19, 1954	Pitcher	Washington Senators, Chicago White Sox, Philadelphia Athletics	
Bill Simas	August 15, 1995	September 30, 2000	Pitcher	Chicago White Sox	
Al Simmons β	April 15, 1924	July 1, 1944	Outfielder	Philadelphia Athletics, Chicago White Sox, Detroit Tigers, Washington Senators, Boston Bees, Cincinnati Reds, Boston Red Sox	
Brian Simmons	September 21, 1998	October 7, 2001	Outfielder	Chicago White Sox, Toronto Blue Jays	
Curt Simmons	September 28, 1947	October 1, 1967	Pitcher	Philadelphia Phillies, St. Louis Cardinals, Chicago Cubs, California Angels	
Hack Simmons	April 15, 1910	June 30, 1915	Second baseman	Detroit Tigers, New York Highlanders, Baltimore Terrapins	
Joe Simmons	May 8, 1971	June 14, 1875	Outfielder	Chicago White Stockings, Cleveland Forest Citys, Keokuk Westerns	
John Simmons	April 22, 1949	September 25, 1949	Outfielder	Washington Senators	
Nelson Simmons	September 4, 1984	May 8, 1987	Outfielder	Detroit Tigers, Baltimore Orioles	
Pat Simmons	April 18, 1928	October 6, 1929	Pitcher	Boston Red Sox	
Ted Simmons	September 21, 1968	October 2, 1988	Catcher	St. Louis Cardinals, Milwaukee Brewers, Atlanta Braves	
Mike Simms	September 5, 1990	October 3, 1999	Outfielder	Houston Astros, Texas Rangers	
Alfredo Simón	September 6, 2008		Pitcher	Baltimore Orioles	
Hank Simon	October 7, 1887	October 12, 1890	Outfielder	Cleveland Blues, Brooklyn Gladiators, Syracuse Stars (AA)	
Mike Simon	June 27, 1909	September 30, 1915	Catcher	Pittsburgh Pirates, St. Louis Terriers, Brooklyn Tip-Tops	
Randall Simon	September 1, 1997	September 30, 2006	First baseman	Atlanta Braves, Detroit Tigers, Pittsburgh Pirates, Chicago Cubs, Tampa Bay Devil Rays, Philadelphia Phillies	
Syl Simon	October 1, 1923	September 27, 1924	Utility infielder	St. Louis Browns	
Doug Simons	April 9, 1991	September 24, 1992	Pitcher	New York Mets, Montreal Expos	
Mel Simons	April 14, 1931	April 20, 1932	Outfielder	Chicago White Sox	
Jason Simontacchi	May 4, 2002	July 15, 2007	Pitcher	St. Louis Cardinals, Washington Nationals	
Allan Simpson	May 17, 2004	June 9, 2006	Pitcher	Colorado Rockies, Cincinnati Reds, Milwaukee Brewers	
Dick Simpson	September 21, 1962	August 27, 1969	Outfielder	Los Angeles/California Angels, Cincinnati Reds, St. Louis Cardinals, Houston Astros, New York Yankees, Seattle Pilots	
Duke Simpson	May 6, 1953	September 17, 1953	Pitcher	Chicago Cubs	
Harry Simpson	April 21, 1951	September 27, 1959	Outfielder	Cleveland Indians, Kansas City Athletics, New York Yankees, Chicago White Sox, Pittsburgh Pirates	
Joe Simpson	September 2, 1975	October 1, 1983	Outfielder	Los Angeles Dodgers, Seattle Mariners, Kansas City Royals	
Marty Simpson	May 14, 1873	July 11, 1873	Second baseman	Baltimore Marylands	
Steve Simpson	September 10, 1972	October 3, 1972	Pitcher	San Diego Padres	
Wayne Simpson	April 9, 1970	September 29, 1977	Pitcher	Cincinnati Reds, Kansas City Royals, Philadelphia Phillies, California Angels	
Duke Sims	September 22, 1964	September 26, 1974	Catcher	Cleveland Indians, Los Angeles Dodgers, Detroit Tigers, New York Yankees, Texas Rangers	
Greg Sims	April 15, 1966	May 19, 1966	Outfielder	Houston Astros	
Pete Sims	September 16, 1915	September 23, 1915	Pitcher	St. Louis Browns	
Matt Sinatro	September 22, 1981	May 26, 1992	Catcher	Atlanta Braves, Oakland Athletics, Detroit Tigers, Seattle Mariners	
Steve Sinclair	April 25, 1998	October 3, 1999	Pitcher	Toronto Blue Jays, Seattle Mariners	
Bert Sincock	June 25, 1908	June 25, 1908	Pitcher	Cincinnati Reds	
Hosea Siner	July 28, 1909	August 23, 1909	Third baseman	Boston Doves	
Bill Singer	September 24, 1964	July 16, 1977	Pitcher	Los Angeles Dodgers, California Angels, Texas Rangers, Minnesota Twins, Toronto Blue Jays	
Chris Singleton	April 10, 1999	May 19, 2005	Outfielder	Chicago White Sox, Baltimore Orioles, Oakland Athletics, Tampa Bay Devil Rays	
Duane Singleton	August 4, 1994	June 6, 1996	Outfielder	Milwaukee Brewers, Detroit Tigers	
Elmer Singleton	August 20, 1945	August 1, 1959	Pitcher	Boston Braves, Pittsburgh Pirates, Washington Senators, Chicago Cubs	
John Singleton	June 8, 1922	September 22, 1922	Pitcher	Philadelphia Phillies	
Ken Singleton	June 24, 1970	September 25, 1984	Outfielder	New York Mets, Montreal Expos, Baltimore Orioles	
Fred Sington	September 23, 1934	June 16, 1939	Outfielder	Washington Senators, Brooklyn Dodgers	
Brett Sinkbeil	September 15, 2010		Pitcher	Florida Marlins	
Dick Sipek	April 28, 1945	September 29, 1945	Outfielder	Cincinnati Reds	
John Sipin	May 24, 1969	August 27, 1969	Second baseman	San Diego Padres	
Tony Sipp	April 22, 2009		Pitcher	Cleveland Indians	
Mike Sirotka	July 19, 1995	September 28, 2000	Pitcher	Chicago White Sox	
Andrew Sisco	April 4, 2005		Pitcher	Kansas City Royals, Chicago White Sox	
Steve Sisco	May 6, 2000	September 30, 2000	Utility player	Atlanta Braves	
Doug Sisk	September 6, 1982	May 23, 1991	Pitcher	New York Mets, Baltimore Orioles, Atlanta Braves	
Tommie Sisk	July 19, 1962	June 14, 1970	Pitcher	Pittsburgh Pirates, San Diego Padres, Chicago White Sox	
Dave Sisler	April 21, 1956	September 23, 1962	Pitcher	Boston Red Sox, Chicago White Sox, Washington Senators (1961–1971), Cincinnati Reds	
Dick Sisler	April 16, 1946	August 1, 1953	First baseman	St. Louis Cardinals, Philadelphia Phillies, Cincinnati Reds	
George Sisler β	June 28, 1915	September 22, 1930	First baseman	St. Louis Browns, Washington Senators, Boston Braves	
Sibby Sisti	July 21, 1939	June 6, 1954	Utility infielder	Boston/Milwaukee Braves	
Carl Sitton	April 24, 1909	September 2, 1909	Pitcher	Cleveland Naps	
Pete Sivess	June 13, 1936	October 2, 1938	Pitcher	Philadelphia Phillies	
Jim Siwy	August 20, 1982	May 12, 1984	Pitcher	Chicago White Sox	
Ed Sixsmith	September 11, 1884	September 11, 1884	Catcher	Philadelphia Quakers	
Grady Sizemore	July 21, 2004		Outfielder	Cleveland Indians	
Scott Sizemore	April 5, 2010		Second baseman	Detroit Tigers, Oakland Athletics	
Ted Sizemore	April 7, 1969	May 27, 1980	Second baseman	Los Angeles Dodgers, St. Louis Cardinals, Philadelphia Phillies, Chicago Cubs, Boston Red Sox	
Frank Skaff	September 11, 1935	October 3, 1943	First baseman	Los Angeles Dodgers, Philadelphia Athletics	
Dave Skaggs	April 17, 1977	October 4, 1980	Catcher	Baltimore Orioles, California Angels	
Joe Skalski	April 10, 1989	April 14, 1989	Pitcher	Cleveland Indians	
Dave Skaugstad	September 25, 1957	September 29, 1957	Pitcher	Cincinnati Redlegs	
Dave Skeels	September 14, 1910	September 14, 1910	Pitcher	Detroit Tigers	
Bud Sketchley	April 14, 1942	April 29, 1942	Outfielder	Chicago White Sox	
Roe Skidmore	September 17, 1970	September 17, 1970	Pinch hitter	Chicago Cubs	
Bill Skiff	May 17, 1921	September 26, 1926	Catcher	Pittsburgh Pirates, New York Yankees	
Al Skinner	July 12, 1884	July 16, 1884	Outfielder	Baltimore Monumentals, Chicago Browns/Pittsburgh Stogies	
Bob Skinner	April 13, 1954	September 24, 1966	Outfielder	Pittsburgh Pirates, Cincinnati Reds, St. Louis Cardinals	
Camp Skinner	May 2, 1922	May 6, 1923	Outfielder	New York Yankees, Boston Red Sox	
Joel Skinner	June 12, 1983	September 22, 1991	Catcher	Chicago White Sox, New York Yankees, Cleveland Indians	
Lou Skizas	April 19, 1956	April 30, 1959	Outfielder	New York Yankees, Kansas City Royals, Detroit Tigers, Chicago White Sox	
Craig Skok	May 4, 1973	July 29, 1979	Pitcher	Boston Red Sox, Texas Rangers, Atlanta Braves	
John Skopec	April 25, 1901	September 11, 1903	Pitcher	Chicago White Stockings (AL), Detroit Tigers	
Bill Skowron	April 13, 1954	October 1, 1967	First baseman	New York Yankees, Los Angeles Dodgers, Washington Senators (1961–1971), Chicago White Sox, California Angels	
Matt Skrmetta	June 6, 2000	September 27, 2000	Pitcher	Montreal Expos, Pittsburgh Pirates	
Bob Skube	September 17, 1982	May 29, 1983	Outfielder	Milwaukee Brewers	
Gordon Slade	April 21, 1930	September 10, 1935	Shortstop	Brooklyn Robins/Dodgers, St. Louis Cardinals, Cincinnati Reds	
Art Sladen	August 22, 1884	August 25, 1884	Outfielder	Boston Reds (UA)	
Jimmy Slagle	April 17, 1899	October 3, 1908	Outfielder	Washington Senators (1891–99), Philadelphia Phillies, Boston Beaneaters, Chicago Orphans/Cubs	
John Slagle	April 30, 1891	April 30, 1891	Pitcher	Cincinnati Kelly's Killers	
Roger Slagle	September 7, 1979	September 7, 1979	Pitcher	New York Yankees	
Walt Slagle	May 4, 1910	May 4, 1910	Pitcher	Cincinnati Reds	
Anthony Slama	July 21, 2010		Pitcher	Minnesota Twins	
Cy Slapnicka	September 26, 1911	August 8, 1918	Pitcher	Chicago Cubs, Pittsburgh Pirates	
John Slappey	August 23, 1920	October 2, 1920	Pitcher	Philadelphia Athletics	
Doug Slaten	September 4, 2006		Pitcher	Arizona Diamondbacks, Washington Nationals	
Jim Slaton	April 14, 1971	September 28, 1986	Pitcher	Milwaukee Brewers, Detroit Tigers, California Angels	
Jack Slattery	September 28, 1901	September 29, 1909	Catcher	Boston Red Sox, Cleveland Naps, Chicago White Stockings (AL), St. Louis Cardinals, Washington Senators	
Mike Slattery	April 17, 1884	July 23, 1891	Outfielder	Boston Reds (UA), New York Giants, New York Giants (PL), Cincinnati Reds, Washington Statesmen	
Phil Slattery	September 16, 1915	September 25, 1915	Pitcher	Pittsburgh Pirates	
Don Slaught	July 6, 1982	May 19, 1997	Catcher	Kansas City Royals, Texas Rangers, New York Yankees, Pittsburgh Pirates, California Angels, Chicago White Sox, San Diego Padres	
Barney Slaughter	August 9, 1910	October 11, 1910	Pitcher	Philadelphia Phillies	
Enos Slaughter β	April 19, 1938	September 29, 1959	Outfielder	St. Louis Cardinals, New York Yankees, Kansas City Royals, Milwaukee Braves	
Sterling Slaughter	April 19, 1964	September 13, 1964	Pitcher	Chicago Cubs	
Bill Slayback	June 26, 1972	October 2, 1974	Pitcher	Detroit Tigers	
Scottie Slayback	September 26, 1926	September 26, 1926	Second baseman	New York Giants	
Steve Slayton	July 21, 1928	July 28, 1928	Pitcher	Boston Red Sox	
Lou Sleater	April 25, 1950	September 28, 1958	Pitcher	St. Louis Browns, Washington Senators, Kansas City Athletics, Milwaukee Braves, Detroit Tigers, Baltimore Orioles	
Terrmel Sledge	April 6, 2004		Outfielder	Montreal Expos/Washington Nationals, San Diego Padres	
Bruce Sloan	April 29, 1944	October 1, 1944	Outfielder	New York Giants	
Tod Sloan	September 22, 1913	July 10, 1919	Outfielder	St. Louis Browns	
Lefty Sloat	April 24, 1948	May 13, 1949	Pitcher	Brooklyn Dodgers, Chicago Cubs	
Brian Slocum	April 22, 2006		Pitcher	Cleveland Indians	
Ron Slocum	September 8, 1969	April 18, 1971	Utility player	San Diego Padres	
Heathcliff Slocumb	April 11, 1991	September 26, 2000	Pitcher	Chicago Cubs, Cleveland Indians, Philadelphia Phillies, Boston Red Sox, Seattle Mariners, Baltimore Orioles, St. Louis Cardinals, San Diego Padres	
Kevin Slowey	June 1, 2007		Pitcher	Minnesota Twins	
Joe Slusarski	April 11, 1991	June 21, 2001	Pitcher	Oakland Athletics, Milwaukee Brewers, Houston Astros, Atlanta Braves	
Craig Smajstrla	September 6, 1988	September 27, 1988	Second baseman	Houston Astros	
Aaron Small	June 11, 1994	June 15, 2006	Pitcher	New York Yankees	
Charlie Small	July 7, 1930	September 25, 1930	Outfielder	Boston Red Sox	
Hank Small	September 27, 1978	September 27, 1978	First baseman	Atlanta Braves	
Jim Small	June 22, 1955	September 27, 1958	Outfielder	Detroit Tigers, Kansas City Athletics	
Mark Small	April 5, 1996	September 3, 1996	Pitcher	Houston Astros	
Roy Smalley Jr.	April 20, 1948	April 21, 1958	Shortstop	Chicago Cubs, Milwaukee Braves, Philadelphia Phillies	
Roy Smalley III	April 30, 1975	October 4, 1987	Shortstop	Texas Rangers, Minnesota Twins, New York Yankees, Chicago White Sox	
Will Smalley	April 19, 1890	April 30, 1891	Third baseman	Cleveland Spiders, Washington Statesmen	
Walt Smallwood	September 19, 1917	August 15, 1919	Pitcher	New York Yankees	
J. D. Smart	April 6, 1999	June 30, 2001	Pitcher	Montreal Expos, Texas Rangers	
Joe Smaza	September 18, 1946	September 21, 1946	Outfielder	Chicago White Sox	
Bill Smiley	October 13, 1874	September 30, 1882	Second baseman	Baltimore Canaries, St. Louis Brown Stockings (AA), Baltimore Orioles (19th century)	
John Smiley	September 1, 1986	August 30, 1997	Pitcher	Pittsburgh Pirates, Minnesota Twins, Cincinnati Reds, Cleveland Indians	
Smith, first name unknown (1884 P)	June 5, 1884	June 5, 1884	Pitcher	Baltimore Monumentals	
Al Smith (RHP)	June 18, 1926	June 18, 1926	Pitcher	New York Giants	
Al Smith (LHP)	May 5, 1934	September 15, 1945	Pitcher	New York Giants, Philadelphia Phillies, Cleveland Indians	
Al Smith (OF)	July 10, 1953	October 4, 1964	Outfielder	Cleveland Indians, Chicago White Sox, Baltimore Orioles, Boston Red Sox	
Aleck Smith	April 23, 1897	October 5, 1906	Catcher	Brooklyn Bridegrooms/Superbas, Baltimore Orioles (19th century), New York Giants, Baltimore Orioles (1901–02), Boston Red Sox, Chicago Cubs	
Art Smith	June 9, 1932	June 13, 1932	Pitcher	Chicago White Sox	
Bernie Smith	July 31, 1970	April 28, 1971	Outfielder	Milwaukee Brewers	
Bill Smith (OF/C/Mgr)	April 14, 1873	July 11, 1873	Utility player	Baltimore Marylands	
Bill Smith (OF)	September 17, 1884	September 17, 1884	Outfielder	Cleveland Blues (NL)	
Billy Smith (RHP)	July 6, 1886	September 13, 1886	Pitcher	Detroit Wolverines	
Bill Smith (LHP)	September 13, 1958	September 28, 1962	Pitcher	St. Louis Cardinals, Philadelphia Phillies	
Billy Smith (2B)	April 13, 1975	September 24, 1981	Second baseman	California Angels, Baltimore Orioles, San Francisco Giants	
Billy Smith (P)	June 9, 1981	October 3, 1981	Pitcher	Houston Astros	
Bob Smith (RHP born 1890)	April 19, 1913	April 19, 1915	Pitcher	Chicago White Sox, Buffalo Buffeds/Blues	
Bob Smith (RHP born 1895)	April 19, 1925	August 7, 1937	Pitcher	Boston Braves, Chicago Cubs, Cincinnati Reds, Boston Bees	
Bob Smith (LHP born 1928)	April 22, 1958	September 27, 1959	Pitcher	Boston Red Sox, Chicago Cubs, Cleveland Indians	
Bob Smith (LHP born 1931)	April 29, 1955	September 23, 1959	Pitcher	Boston Red Sox, St. Louis Cardinals, Pittsburgh Pirates, Detroit Tigers	
Bob Smith	March 31, 1998	May 6, 2002	Third baseman	Tampa Bay Devil Rays	
Bobby Smith	April 16, 1957	July 17, 1965	Outfielder	St. Louis Cardinals, Philadelphia Phillies, New York Mets, Chicago Cubs, California Angels	
Brian Smith	September 11, 2000	September 15, 2000	Pitcher	Pittsburgh Pirates	
Brick Smith	September 13, 1987	April 23, 1988	First baseman	Seattle Mariners	
Bryn Smith	September 8, 1981	June 1, 1993	Pitcher	Montreal Expos, St. Louis Cardinals, Colorado Rockies	
Bud Smith	June 10, 2001	July 19, 2002	Pitcher	St. Louis Cardinals	
Bull Smith	August 30, 1904	August 30, 1911	Outfielder	Pittsburgh Pirates, Chicago Cubs, Washington Senators	
Carr Smith	September 23, 1923	June 9, 1924	Outfielder	Washington Senators	
Charley Smith	September 8, 1960	April 22, 1969	Third baseman	Los Angeles Dodgers, Philadelphia Phillies, Chicago White Sox, New York Mets, St. Louis Cardinals, New York Yankees, Chicago Cubs	
Charlie Smith (3B)	May 18, 1871	August 1, 1871	Third baseman	New York Mutuals	
Charlie Smith (P)	August 6, 1902	September 19, 1914	Pitcher	Cleveland Bronchos, Washington Senators, Boston Red Sox, Chicago Cubs	
Chick Smith	April 12, 1913	May 21, 1913	Pitcher	Cincinnati Reds	
Chris Smith (1B)	May 14, 1981	October 2, 1983	First baseman	Montreal Expos, San Francisco Giants	
Chris Smith (P)	June 21, 2008		Pitcher	Boston Red Sox, Milwaukee Brewers	
Chuck Smith	June 13, 2000	July 24, 2001	Pitcher	Florida Marlins	
Clay Smith	September 13, 1938	September 22, 1940	Pitcher	Cleveland Indians, Detroit Tigers	
D. Smith	September 15, 1875	October 9, 1875	Second baseman	Brooklyn Atlantics	
Dan Smith (LHP)	September 12, 1992	July 8, 1994	Pitcher	Texas Rangers	
Dan Smith (RHP)	June 8, 1999	June 25, 2003	Pitcher	Montreal Expos, Boston Red Sox	
Daryl Smith	September 18, 1990	October 3, 1990	Pitcher	Kansas City Royals	
Dave Smith (P, born 1914)	June 16, 1938	April 23, 1939	Pitcher	Philadelphia Athletics	
Dave Smith (P, born 1955)	April 11, 1980	June 8, 1992	Pitcher	Houston Astros, Chicago Cubs	
Dave Smith (P, born 1957)	September 18, 1984	September 14, 1985	Pitcher	California Angels	
Dick Smith (3B)	September 14, 1951	May 1, 1955	Third baseman	Pittsburgh Pirates	
Dick Smith (NL OF)	July 20, 1963	May 2, 1965	Outfielder	New York Mets, Los Angeles Dodgers	
Dick Smith (AL OF)	August 20, 1969	September 27, 1969	Outfielder	Washington Senators (1961–1971)	
Doug Smith	July 10, 1912	July 10, 1912	Pitcher	Boston Red Sox	
Dwight Smith	May 1, 1989	September 29, 1996	Outfielder	Chicago Cubs, California Angels, Baltimore Orioles, Atlanta Braves	
Earl Smith (1910s OF)	September 10, 1916	August 6, 1922	Outfielder	Chicago Cubs, St. Louis Browns, Washington Senators	
Earl Smith (C)	April 24, 1919	September 28, 1930	Catcher	New York Giants, Boston Braves, Pittsburgh Pirates, St. Louis Cardinals	
Earl Smith (1950s OF)	April 14, 1955	April 29, 1955	Outfielder	Pittsburgh Pirates	
Ed Smith (1880s P)	April 18, 1884	May 22, 1884	Pitcher	Baltimore Monumentals	
Ed Smith (1900s P)	April 27, 1906	October 7, 1906	Pitcher	St. Louis Browns	
Eddie Smith	September 20, 1936	September 20, 1947	Pitcher	Philadelphia Athletics, Chicago White Sox, Boston Red Sox	
Edgar Smith (OF)	June 20, 1883	September 29, 1883	Outfielder	Boston Beaneaters	
Edgar Smith (P)	May 23, 1883	August 12, 1918	Pitcher	Philadelphia Quakers, Washington Nationals (AA), Providence Grays, Cleveland Spiders	
Elmer Smith	September 20, 1914	September 27, 1925	Outfielder	Cleveland Naps/Indians, Washington Senators, Boston Red Sox, New York Yankees, Cincinnati Reds	
Ernie Smith	April 17, 1930	May 22, 1930	Shortstop	Chicago White Sox	
Frank Smith (C)	August 6, 1884	October 3, 1884	Catcher	Pittsburgh Alleghenys	
Frank Smith (1900s P)	April 22, 1904	September 30, 1915	Pitcher	Chicago White Sox, Boston Red Sox, Cincinnati Reds, Baltimore Terrapins, Brooklyn Tip-Tops	
Frank Smith (1950s P)	April 18, 1950	May 13, 1956	Pitcher	Cincinnati Reds/Redlegs, St. Louis Cardinals	
Fred Smith (1890s P)	April 18, 1890	October 12, 1890	Pitcher	Toledo Maumees	
Fred Smith (1900s P)	June 14, 1907	September 21, 1907	Pitcher	Cincinnati Reds	
Fred Smith (IF)	April 17, 1913	September 30, 1917	Third baseman	Boston Braves, Buffalo Buffeds/Blues, Brooklyn Tip-Tops, St. Louis Cardinals	
George Smith (NL P)	August 9, 1916	September 21, 1923	Second baseman	New York Giants, Cincinnati Reds, Brooklyn Robins, Philadelphia Phillies	
George Smith (2B)	April 21, 1926	September 17, 1930	Pitcher	Detroit Tigers, Boston Red Sox	
George Smith (AL P)	August 4, 1963	September 17, 1966	Pitcher	Detroit Tigers, Boston Red Sox	
Germany Smith	April 17, 1884	October 9, 1898	Shortstop	Altoona Mountain City, Cleveland Blues, Brooklyn Grays/Bridegrooms, Cincinnati Reds, St. Louis Browns (NL)	
Greg Smith (IF)	September 2, 1989	May 24, 1991	Second baseman	Chicago Cubs, Los Angeles Dodgers	
Greg Smith (P)	April 9, 2008		Pitcher	Oakland Athletics, Colorado Rockies	
Hal Smith (P)	September 14, 1932	April 18, 1935	Pitcher	Pittsburgh Pirates	
Hal Smith (C/IF)	April 11, 1955	July 22, 1964	Catcher	Baltimore Orioles, Kansas City Athletics, Pittsburgh Pirates, Houston Colt .45s, Cincinnati Reds	
Hal Smith (C)	May 2, 1956	July 8, 1965	Catcher	St. Louis Cardinals, Pittsburgh Pirates	
Happy Smith	April 15, 1910	July 22, 1910	Outfielder	Brooklyn Superbas	
Harry Smith (2B)	May 8, 1877	August 19, 1889	Second baseman	Chicago White Stockings, Cincinnati Reds (1876–1880), Louisville Colonels	
Harry Smith (1900s C)	July 11, 1901	September 15, 1910	Catcher	Philadelphia Athletics, Pittsburgh Pirates, Boston Doves	
Harry Smith (P)	October 6, 1912	October 6, 1912	Pitcher	Chicago White Sox	
Harry Smith (1910s C)	September 21, 1914	June 23, 1918	Catcher	New York Giants, Brooklyn Tip-Tops, Cincinnati Reds	
Harvey Smith	August 19, 1896	September 26, 1896	Third baseman	Washington Senators (1891–99)	
Heinie Smith	September 8, 1897	August 16, 1903	Second baseman	Louisville Colonels, Pittsburgh Pirates, New York Giants, Detroit Tigers	
Jack Smith (3B)	May 8, 1912	May 8, 1912	Third baseman	Detroit Tigers	
Jack Smith (OF)	September 30, 1915	July 7, 1929	Outfielder	St. Louis Cardinals, Boston Braves	
Jack Smith (P)	September 10, 1962	June 21, 1964	Pitcher	Los Angeles Dodgers, Milwaukee Braves	
Jake Smith	October 3, 1911	October 9, 1911	Pitcher	Philadelphia Phillies	
Jason Smith	June 17, 2001		Utility infielder	Chicago Cubs, Tampa Bay Devil Rays, Detroit Tigers, Colorado Rockies, Toronto Blue Jays, Arizona Diamondbacks, Kansas City Royals, Houston Astros	
Jim Smith	April 12, 1982	September 28, 1982	Shortstop	Pittsburgh Pirates	
Jimmy Smith	September 26, 1914	September 3, 1922	Utility infielder	Chicago Chi-Feds/Whales, Baltimore Terrapins, Pittsburgh Pirates, New York Giants, Boston Braves, Cincinnati Reds, Philadelphia Phillies	
Joe Smith (C)	July 7, 1913	September 27, 1913	Catcher	New York Yankees	
Joe Smith (P)	April 1, 2007		Pitcher	New York Mets, Cleveland Indians	
John Smith (SS)	April 14, 1873	May 21, 1875	Shortstop	Baltimore Marylands, Baltimore Canaries, New Haven Elm Citys	
John Smith (NL 1B)	May 1, 1882	September 27, 1882	First baseman	Troy Trojans, Worcester Ruby Legs	
John Smith (AL 1B)	September 17, 1931	September 18, 1931	First baseman	Boston Red Sox	
Jordan Smith	June 15, 2010		Pitcher	Cincinnati Reds	
Jud Smith	May 21, 1893	September 15, 1901	Third baseman	Cincinnati Reds, St. Louis Cardinals, Pittsburgh Pirates, Washington Senators (1891–99)	
Keith Smith (OF)	August 2, 1977	October 5, 1980	Outfielder	Texas Rangers, St. Louis Cardinals	
Keith Smith (SS)	April 12, 1984	October 5, 1985	Shortstop	New York Yankees	
Ken Smith	September 22, 1981	June 14, 1983	First baseman	Atlanta Braves	
Klondike Smith	September 28, 1912	October 5, 1912	Outfielder	New York Yankees	
Lee Smith	September 1, 1980	July 2, 1997	Pitcher	Chicago Cubs, Boston Red Sox, St. Louis Cardinals, New York Yankees, Baltimore Orioles, California Angels, Cincinnati Reds, Montreal Expos	
Leo Smith	August 28, 1890	October 15, 1890	Shortstop	Rochester Broncos	
Lewis Smith	September 7, 1882	September 7, 1882	Outfielder	Baltimore Orioles (19th century)	
Lonnie Smith	September 2, 1978	August 10, 1994	Outfielder	Philadelphia Phillies, St. Louis Cardinals, Kansas City Royals, Atlanta Braves, Pittsburgh Pirates, Baltimore Orioles	
Mark Smith (P)	August 12, 1983	October 2, 1983	Pitcher	Oakland Athletics	
Mark Smith (OF)	May 14, 1993	September 28, 2003	Outfielder	Baltimore Orioles, Pittsburgh Pirates, Florida Marlins, Montreal Expos, Milwaukee Brewers	
Matt Smith	April 14, 2006	April 25, 2007	Pitcher	New York Yankees, Philadelphia Phillies	
Mayo Smith	June 24, 1945	September 27, 1945	Outfielder	Philadelphia Athletics	
Mike Smith (1890s OF)	September 10, 1886	June 15, 1901	Outfielder	Cincinnati Red Stockings (AA), Pittsburgh Pirates, Cincinnati Reds, New York Giants, Boston Beaneaters	
Mike Smith (1920s OF)	September 4, 1926	September 20, 1926	Outfielder	New York Giants	
Mike Smith (1984–89 P)	April 6, 1984	September 30, 1989	Pitcher	Cincinnati Reds, Montreal Expos, Pittsburgh Pirates	
Mike Smith (1989–90 P)	June 30, 1989	September 30, 1990	Pitcher	Baltimore Orioles	
Mike Smith (2000s P)	April 26, 2002	August 6, 2006	Pitcher	Toronto Blue Jays, Minnesota Twins	
Milt Smith	July 21, 1955	September 25, 1955	Third baseman	Cincinnati Redlegs	
Nate Smith	September 19, 1962	September 29, 1962	Catcher	Baltimore Orioles	
Ollie Smith	July 11, 1894	August 25, 1894	Outfielder	Louisville Colonels	
Ozzie Smith β	April 7, 1978	September 29, 1996	Shortstop	San Diego Padres, St. Louis Cardinals	
Paddy Smith	July 6, 1920	July 7, 1920	Catcher	Boston Red Sox	
Paul Smith (OF)	September 19, 1916	October 1, 1916	Outfielder	Cincinnati Reds	
Paul Smith (1B)	April 14, 1953	June 7, 1958	First baseman	Pittsburgh Pirates, Chicago Cubs	
Pete Smith (1962–63 P)	September 13, 1962	September 28, 1963	Pitcher	Boston Red Sox	
Pete Smith (1987–98 P)	September 8, 1987	September 24, 1998	Pitcher	Atlanta Braves, New York Mets, Cincinnati Reds, San Diego Padres, Baltimore Orioles	
Phenomenal Smith	April 18, 1884	June 15, 1891	Pitcher	Philadelphia Athletics (AA), Pittsburgh Alleghenys, Brooklyn Grays, Detroit Wolverines, Baltimore Orioles (19th century), Philadelphia Phillies	
Pop Smith	May 1, 1880	June 9, 1891	Second baseman	Cincinnati Reds (1876–1880), Cleveland Blues (NL), Buffalo Bisons, Worcester Ruby Legs, Philadelphia Athletics (AA), Louisville Eclipse, Columbus Buckeyes, Pittsburgh Alleghenys, Boston Beaneaters, Washington Statesmen	
Pop-Boy Smith	April 19, 1913	May 2, 1917	Pitcher	Chicago White Sox, Cleveland Indians	
Ray Smith	April 9, 1981	September 21, 1983	Catcher	Minnesota Twins	
Red Smith (3B)	September 5, 1911	September 25, 1919	Third baseman	Brooklyn Dodgers/Superbas/Robins, Boston Braves	
Red Smith (1910s C)	September 17, 1917	September 1, 1918	Catcher	Pittsburgh Pirates	
Red Smith (SS)	April 14, 1925	September 26, 1925	Shortstop	Philadelphia Athletics	
Red Smith (1920s C)	May 31, 1927	May 31, 1927	Catcher	New York Giants	
Reggie Smith	September 18, 1966	October 3, 1982	Outfielder	Boston Red Sox, St. Louis Cardinals, Los Angeles Dodgers, San Francisco Giants	
Rex Smith	May 31, 1886	July 11, 1886	Pitcher	Cincinnati Reds, Philadelphia Athletics (AA)	
Roy Smith (1980s P)	June 23, 1984	August 16, 1991	Pitcher	Cleveland Indians, Minnesota Twins, Baltimore Orioles	
Roy Smith (2000s P)	May 26, 2001	September 29, 2002	Pitcher	Cleveland Indians	
Rufus Smith	October 2, 1927	October 2, 1927	Pitcher	Detroit Tigers	
Seth Smith	September 16, 2007		Outfielder	Colorado Rockies	
Sherry Smith	May 11, 1911	July 18, 1927	Pitcher	Pittsburgh Pirates, Brooklyn Robins, Cleveland Indians	
Skyrocket Smith	April 18, 1888	July 2, 1888	First baseman	Louisville Colonels	
Stub Smith	September 10, 1898	October 15, 1898	Shortstop	Boston Beaneaters	
Syd Smith	April 14, 1908	April 18, 1915	Catcher	Philadelphia Athletics, St. Louis Browns, Cleveland Naps, Pittsburgh Pirates	
Tom Smith (P)	June 6, 1894	May 12, 1898	Pitcher	Boston Beaneaters, Philadelphia Phillies, Louisville Colonels, St. Louis Cardinals	
Tommy Smith	September 6, 1973	September 10, 1977	Outfielder	Cleveland Indians, Seattle Mariners	
Tony Smith	August 12, 1907	July 11, 1911	Shortstop	Washington Senators, Brooklyn Superbas/Dodgers	
Travis Smith	June 21, 1998	May 20, 2006	Pitcher	Milwaukee Brewers, St. Louis Cardinals, Atlanta Braves, Florida Marlins	
Vinnie Smith	September 10, 1941	April 27, 1946	Catcher	Pittsburgh Pirates	
Wally Smith	April 17, 1911	October 7, 1914	Utility infielder	St. Louis Cardinals, Washington Senators	
Wib Smith	May 31, 1909	September 29, 1909	Catcher	St. Louis Browns	
Willie Smith (OF)	June 18, 1963	September 30, 1971	Outfielder	Detroit Tigers, Los Angeles/California Angels, Cleveland Indians, Chicago Cubs, Cincinnati Reds	
Willie Smith (P)	April 25, 1994	May 10, 1994	Pitcher	St. Louis Cardinals	
Zane Smith	September 10, 1984	July 5, 1996	Pitcher	Atlanta Braves, Montreal Expos, Pittsburgh Pirates, Boston Red Sox	
Roger Smithberg	September 1, 1993	July 2, 1994	Pitcher	Oakland Athletics	
Stephen Smitherman	July 1, 2003	September 25, 2003	Outfielder	Cincinnati Reds	
Mike Smithson	August 27, 1982	September 28, 1989	Pitcher	Texas Rangers, Minnesota Twins, Boston Red Sox	
Justin Smoak	April 23, 2010		First baseman	Texas Rangers, Seattle Mariners	
Lefty Smoll	April 26, 1940	September 12, 1940	Pitcher	Philadelphia Phillies	
John Smoltz	July 23, 1988		Pitcher	Atlanta Braves, Boston Red Sox, St. Louis Cardinals	
Homer Smoot	April 17, 1902	October 7, 1906	Center fielder	St. Louis Cardinals, Cincinnati Reds	
Henry Smoyer	August 14, 1912	September 7, 1912	Shortstop	St. Louis Browns	
Frank Smykal	August 30, 1916	September 10, 1916	Shortstop	Pittsburgh Pirates	
Clancy Smyres	April 18, 1944	April 30, 1944	Pinch hitter	Brooklyn Dodgers	
Red Smyth	August 11, 1915	June 18, 1918	Outfielder	Brooklyn Robins, St. Louis Cardinals	
Steve Smyth	August 6, 2002	September 27, 2002	Pitcher	Chicago Cubs	
Harry Smythe	July 21, 1929	June 26, 1934	Pitcher	Philadelphia Phillies, New York Yankees, Brooklyn Dodgers	
Ryan Snare	August 6, 2004	August 6, 2004	Pitcher	Texas Rangers	
Esix Snead	September 3, 2002	May 21, 2004	Outfielder	New York Mets	
John Sneed	May 1, 1884	September 22, 1891	Outfielder	Indianapolis Hoosiers (AA), Toledo Maumees, Columbus Solons	
Charlie Snell	July 19, 1912	August 14, 1912	Catcher	St. Louis Browns	
Ian Snell	August 20, 2004		Pitcher	Pittsburgh Pirates, Seattle Mariners	
Nate Snell	September 20, 1984	September 29, 1987	Pitcher	Baltimore Orioles, Detroit Tigers	
Wally Snell	August 1, 1913	October 4, 1913	Catcher	Boston Red Sox	
Chris Snelling	May 25, 2002		Outfielder	Seattle Mariners, Washington Nationals, Oakland Athletics, Philadelphia Phillies	
Duke Snider β	April 17, 1947	October 3, 1964	Outfielder	Brooklyn Dodgers, Los Angeles Dodgers, New York Mets, San Francisco Giants	
Travis Snider	August 29, 2008		Outfielder	Toronto Blue Jays	
Van Snider	September 2, 1988	July 29, 1989	Outfielder	Cincinnati Reds	
Roxy Snipes	July 15, 1923	July 15, 1923	Pinch hitter	Chicago White Sox	
Chappie Snodgrass	May 15, 1901	May 16, 1901	Outfielder	Baltimore Orioles (1901–02)	
Fred Snodgrass	June 4, 1908	October 5, 1916	Outfielder	New York Giants, Boston Braves	
Frank Snook	July 13, 1973	September 29, 1973	Pitcher	San Diego Padres	
Chris Snopek	July 31, 1995	September 27, 1998	Third baseman	Chicago White Sox, Boston Red Sox	
Colonel Snover	September 18, 1919	September 25, 1919	Pitcher	New York Giants	
Charlie Snow	October 1, 1874	October 1, 1874	Catcher	Brooklyn Atlantics	
J. T. Snow	September 20, 1992	June 18, 2006	First baseman	New York Yankees, California Angels, San Francisco Giants, Boston Red Sox	
Bernie Snyder	September 15, 1935	September 29, 1935	Utility infielder	Philadelphia Athletics	
Bill Snyder	September 4, 1919	July 20, 1920	Pitcher	Washington Senators	
Brad Snyder	September 7, 2010		Outfielder	Chicago Cubs	
Brandon Snyder	September 10, 2010		First baseman	Baltimore Orioles	
Brian Snyder	May 25, 1985	June 27, 1989	Pitcher	Seattle Mariners, Oakland Athletics	
Charles Snyder	September 19, 1890	October 8, 1890	Utility player	Philadelphia Athletics (AA)	
Chris Snyder	August 21, 2004		Catcher	Arizona Diamondbacks, Pittsburgh Pirates	
Cooney Snyder	May 19, 1898	June 19, 1898	Catcher	Louisville Colonels	
Cory Snyder	June 13, 1986	August 10, 1994	Outfielder	Cleveland Indians, Chicago White Sox, Toronto Blue Jays, San Francisco Giants, Los Angeles Dodgers	
Earl Snyder	April 28, 2002	August 18, 2004	First baseman	Cleveland Indians, Boston Red Sox	
Frank Snyder	August 25, 1912	September 29, 1927	Catcher	St. Louis Cardinals, New York Giants	
Gene Snyder	April 26, 1959	July 14, 1959	Pitcher	Los Angeles Dodgers	
George Snyder	September 30, 1882	September 30, 1882	Pitcher	Philadelphia Athletics (AA)	
Jack Snyder	June 13, 1914	October 4, 1917	Catcher	Buffalo Buffeds, Brooklyn Robins	
Jerry Snyder	May 8, 1952	May 10, 1958	Shortstop	Washington Senators	
Jim Snyder (SS)	May 7, 1872	October 5, 1872	Shortstop	Eckford of Brooklyn	
Jim Snyder (2B)	September 15, 1961	August 2, 1964	Second baseman	Minnesota Twins	
John Snyder	June 30, 1998	September 23, 2000	Pitcher	Chicago White Sox, Milwaukee Brewers	
Josh Snyder	May 18, 1872	July 9, 1872	Outfielder	Eckford of Brooklyn	
Kyle Snyder	May 1, 2003		Pitcher	Kansas City Royals, Boston Red Sox	
Pop Snyder	June 16, 1873	July 4, 1891	Catcher	Washington Blue Legs, Baltimore Canaries, Philadelphia White Stockings, Louisville Grays, Boston Red Caps, Cincinnati Red Stockings (AA), Cleveland Blues (AA), Cleveland Spiders, Cleveland Infants, Washington Statesmen	
Redleg Snyder	April 25, 1876	September 12, 1884	Outfielder	Cincinnati Reds (1876–1880), Wilmington Quicksteps	
Russ Snyder	April 18, 1959	September 30, 1970	Outfielder	Kansas City Athletics, Baltimore Orioles, Chicago White Sox, Cleveland Indians, Milwaukee Brewers	
Scott Sobkowiak	October 7, 2001	October 7, 2001	Pitcher	Atlanta Braves	
Chief Sockalexis	April 22, 1897	May 13, 1899	Outfielder	Cleveland Spiders	
Bill Sodd	September 27, 1937	September 27, 1937	Pinch hitter	Cleveland Indians	
Eric Soderholm	September 3, 1971	October 5, 1980	Third baseman	Minnesota Twins, Chicago White Sox, Texas Rangers	
Steve Soderstrom	September 17, 1996	September 27, 1996	Pitcher	San Francisco Giants	
Clint Sodowsky	September 4, 1995	May 22, 1999	Pitcher	Detroit Tigers, Pittsburgh Pirates, Arizona Diamondbacks, St. Louis Cardinals	
Ray Soff	July 17, 1986	May 28, 1987	Pitcher	St. Louis Cardinals	
Rick Sofield	April 6, 1979	October 4, 1981	Outfielder	Minnesota Twins	
Eric Sogard	September 14, 2010		Infielder	Oakland Athletics	
Luis Sojo	July 14, 1990	September 28, 2003	Utility infielder	Toronto Blue Jays, California Angels, Seattle Mariners, New York Yankees, Pittsburgh Pirates	
Tony Solaita	September 16, 1968	September 30, 1979	First baseman	New York Yankees, Kansas City Royals, California Angels, Montreal Expos, Toronto Blue Jays	
Julio Solano	April 5, 1983	April 30, 1989	Pitcher	Houston Astros, Seattle Mariners	
Alay Soler	May 24, 2006	July 2, 2006	Pitcher	New York Mets	
Marcelino Solis	July 16, 1958	September 13, 1958	Pitcher	Chicago Cubs	
Eddie Solomon	September 2, 1973	July 1, 1982	Pitcher	Los Angeles Dodgers, Chicago Cubs, St. Louis Cardinals, Atlanta Braves, Pittsburgh Pirates, Chicago White Sox	
Mose Solomon	September 30, 1923	October 7, 1923	Outfielder	New York Giants	
Moose Solters	April 17, 1934	September 26, 1943	Outfielder	Boston Red Sox, St. Louis Browns, Cleveland Indians, Chicago White Sox	
Jock Somerlott	September 19, 1910	May 25, 1911	First baseman	Washington Senators	
Ed Somerville	April 21, 1875	October 5, 1876	Second baseman	Philadelphia Centennials, New Haven Elm Citys, Louisville Grays	
Joe Sommer	July 8, 1880	October 15, 1890	Outfielder	Cincinnati Reds (1876–1880), Cincinnati Red Stockings (AA), Baltimore Orioles (19th century), Cleveland Spiders	
Andy Sommers	April 27, 1887	October 4, 1890	Catcher	New York Metropolitans, Boston Beaneaters, Chicago White Stockings, Indianapolis Hoosiers (NL), New York Giants, Cleveland Spiders	
Bill Sommers	April 25, 1950	October 1, 1950	Third baseman	St. Louis Browns	
Rudy Sommers	September 8, 1912	July 13, 1927	Pitcher	Chicago Cubs, Brooklyn Tip-Tops, Boston Red Sox	
Andy Sommerville	August 8, 1894	August 8, 1894	Pitcher	Brooklyn Grooms	
Don Songer	September 21, 1924	August 5, 1927	Pitcher	Pittsburgh Pirates, New York Giants	
Andy Sonnanstine	June 5, 2007		Pitcher	Tampa Bay Devil Rays/Rays	
Lary Sorensen	June 7, 1977	September 24, 1988	Pitcher	Milwaukee Brewers, St. Louis Cardinals, Cleveland Indians, Oakland Athletics, Chicago Cubs, Montreal Expos, San Francisco Giants	
Zach Sorensen	June 3, 2003	October 2, 2005	Second baseman	Cleveland Indians, Los Angeles Angels of Anaheim	
Joakim Soria	April 4, 2007		Pitcher	Kansas City Royals	
Alfonso Soriano	September 14, 1999		Second baseman	New York Yankees, Texas Rangers, Washington Nationals, Chicago Cubs	
Rafael Soriano	May 10, 2002		Pitcher	Seattle Mariners, Atlanta Braves, Tampa Bay Rays, New York Yankees	
Billy Sorrell	September 2, 1965	October 1, 1970	Third baseman	Philadelphia Phillies, San Francisco Giants, Kansas City Royals	
Vic Sorrell	April 22, 1928	June 3, 1937	Pitcher	Detroit Tigers	
Chick Sorrells	September 18, 1922	September 21, 1922	Shortstop	Cleveland Indians	
Paul Sorrento	September 8, 1989	October 2, 1999	First baseman	Minnesota Twins, Cleveland Indians, Seattle Mariners, Tampa Bay Devil Rays	
Elías Sosa	September 8, 1972	September 18, 1983	Pitcher	San Francisco Giants, St. Louis Cardinals, Atlanta Braves, Los Angeles Dodgers, Oakland Athletics, Montreal Expos, Detroit Tigers, San Diego Padres	
Henry Sosa	August 10, 2011		Pitcher	Houston Astros	
Jorge Sosa	April 4, 2002		Pitcher	Tampa Bay Devil Rays, Atlanta Braves, St. Louis Cardinals, New York Mets, Washington Nationals, Florida Marlins	
José Sosa	July 22, 1975	September 26, 1976	Pitcher	Houston Astros	
Juan Sosa	September 10, 1999	May 25, 2001	Outfielder	Colorado Rockies, Arizona Diamondbacks	
Sammy Sosa	June 16, 1989	September 29, 2007	Outfielder	Texas Rangers, Chicago White Sox, Chicago Cubs, Baltimore Orioles	
Denny Sothern	September 10, 1926	September 21, 1931	Outfielder	Philadelphia Phillies, Pittsburgh Pirates, Brooklyn Dodgers	
Allen Sothoron	September 17, 1914	September 6, 1926	Pitcher	St. Louis Browns, Boston Red Sox, Cleveland Indians, St. Louis Cardinals	
Geovany Soto	September 23, 2005		Catcher	Chicago Cubs	
Mario Soto	July 21, 1977	June 16, 1988	Pitcher	Cincinnati Reds	
Steve Souchock	May 25, 1946	April 15, 1955	Outfielder	New York Yankees, Chicago White Sox, Detroit Tigers	
Clyde Southwick	April 22, 1911	September 9, 1911	Catcher	St. Louis Browns	
Bill Southworth	October 2, 1964	October 4, 1964	Third baseman	Milwaukee Braves	
Billy Southworth β	August 4, 1913	July 9, 1929	Outfielder	Cleveland Naps/Indians, Pittsburgh Pirates, Boston Braves, New York Giants, St. Louis Cardinals	
Mark Souza	April 22, 1980	May 18, 1980	Pitcher	Oakland Athletics	
Bill Sowders	April 24, 1888	June 19, 1890	Pitcher	Boston Beaneaters, Pittsburgh Alleghenys	
John Sowders	June 28, 1887	October 4, 1890	Pitcher	Indianapolis Hoosiers (NL), Kansas City Cowboys (AA), Brooklyn Ward's Wonders	
Len Sowders	September 10, 1886	October 14, 1886	Outfielder	Baltimore Orioles (19th century)	
Jeremy Sowers	June 25, 2006		Pitcher	Cleveland Indians	
