= Al Smith (left-handed pitcher) =

American baseball player (1907–1977)

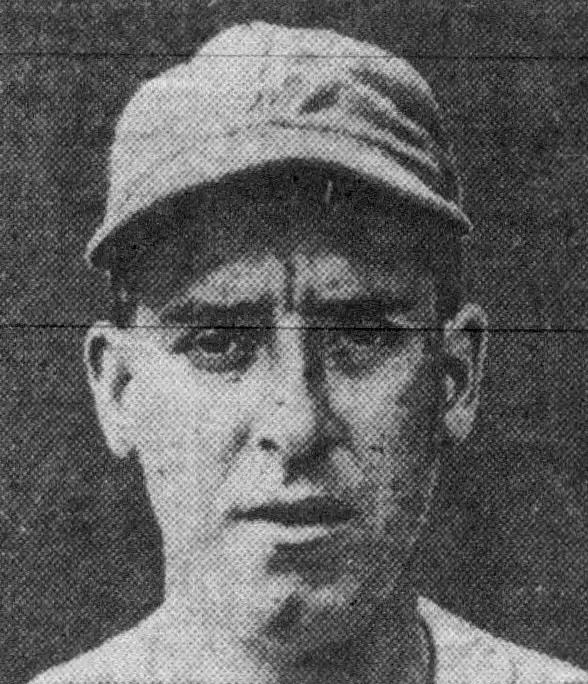
- Smith, circa 1942
- Pitcher
- Born: October 12, 1907; Belleville, Illinois, U.S.
- Died: April 28, 1977 (aged 69); Brownsville, Texas, U.S.
- Batted: Left Threw: Left

MLB debut
- May 5, 1934, for the New York Giants

Last MLB appearance
- September 15, 1945, for the Cleveland Indians

MLB statistics
- Win–loss record: 99–101
- Earned run average: 3.72
- Strikeouts: 587
- Stats at Baseball Reference

Teams
- New York Giants (1934–1937); Philadelphia Phillies (1938–1939); Cleveland Indians (1940–1945)

Career highlights and awards
- All-Star (1943)

Alfred John Smith (October 12, 1907 – April 28, 1977) was an American professional baseball player, a left-handed pitcher for the New York Giants (1934–37), Philadelphia Phillies (1938–39) and Cleveland Indians (1940–45) of Major League Baseball.

== Helped halt DiMaggio's hit streak ==
Smith is remembered for being the starting pitcher who halted Joe DiMaggio's 56-consecutive-game hitting streak on July 17, 1941. DiMaggio grounded out twice to third baseman Ken Keltner, who made outstanding defensive plays in each case, and also drew a base on balls from Smith in three plate appearances. Then, in his final at bat, against relief pitcher Jim Bagby, Jr., DiMaggio bounced into a double play. His New York Yankees won the game, however, 4–3.

Smith also is notable for having served as a nominal coach at age 25 on manager Bill Terry's New York Giants staff in 1933—the year before Smith made his debut as an active player in the Major Leagues. In 1932, Smith had won 17 games in the Class B Piedmont League and was acquired by the Giants. But Terry, realizing he had no room on his 1933 pitching staff, decided to keep Smith on his ball club as a coach and batting practice pitcher, rather than risk losing him in the minor league draft. According to the Associated Press in a January 5, 1934, story, "Smith was tabbed as great prospect last spring, but Terry had so many experienced moundsmen to bank upon that there was no place for the young portsider. Rather than farm him out where he might have been grabbed by some rival club, the Giants elected to carry him as a coach." The same story claims that the 1933 World Champion Giant hitters struggled against Smith's "wide breaking curves" whenever he was called upon to pitch batting practice.

Smith made his Major League pitching debut on May 5, 1934, against the Pittsburgh Pirates at Forbes Field and allowed one run in two innings pitched in relief of Freddie Fitzsimmons.

== Early life and career ==
Born in Belleville, Illinois, the 5 ft 11 in (1.80 m), 180 lb (82 kg) Smith had a 17-year professional career. He helped the Giants win the 1936 and 1937 National League pennants and appeared in relief in the 1936 and 1937 World Series, both against the Yankees, allowing four earned runs in 3 1/3 innings pitched. He led the NL in shutouts (four) in 1936.

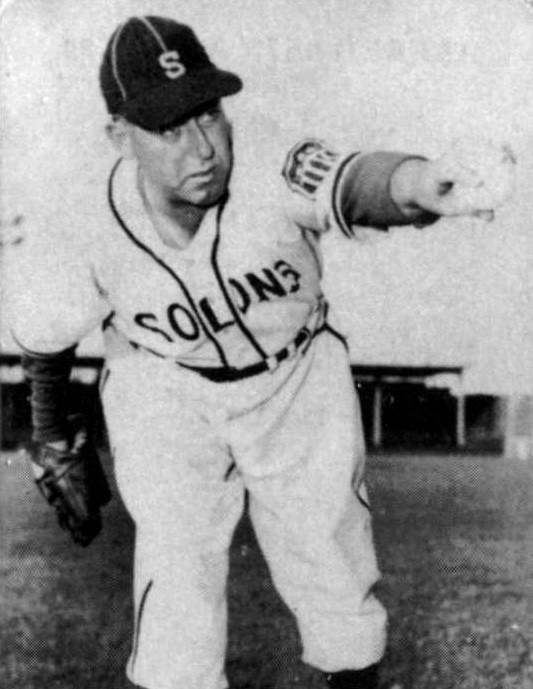
Smith as a member of the Sacramento Solons of the PCL in 1946.

Smith's best season was in 1943, when he was named to the American League All-Star team and finished 15th in voting for the AL MVP Award for having a 17–7 win–loss record in 29 games (27 started), 14 complete games, three shutouts, two games finished, one save, 208 1/3 innings pitched, 186 hits allowed, 74 runs allowed, 59 earned runs allowed, seven home runs allowed, 72 bases on balls, 72 strikeouts, 862 batters faced, a 2.55 earned run average and a 1.238 WHIP.

In 12 seasons Smith had a 99–101 record, 356 games (202 started), 75 complete games, 16 shutouts, 96 games finished, 17 saves, 1,662 1/3 innings pitched, 1,707 hits allowed, 827 runs allowed, 688 earned runs allowed, 94 home runs allowed, 587 walks allowed—and the same number of strikeouts—as well as 32 hit batsmen, 27 wild pitches, 7,112 batters faced, 3 balks, a 3.72 ERA and a 1.380 WHIP.

As a hitter, Smith posted a .191 batting average (102-for-535) with 48 runs, 2 home runs, 38 RBI and 51 bases on balls. Defensively, he recorded a .961 fielding percentage.

Al Smith died in Brownsville, Texas, at the age of 69. He is not to be confused with Alfred Kendricks Smith, a right-handed pitcher who appeared in one game for the 1926 Giants.

Received the 1943 Cleveland Indians "Most Valuable Player Award" voted on by the Cleveland Chapter of the Baseball Writers Association of America (BBWAA). He was formally recognized at a private dinner by the writers on May 24, 1944.
