= Jimmy Boyle (baseball) =

American baseball player (1904-1958)

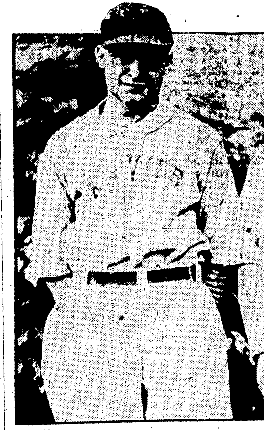
- Boyle as a college player
- Catcher
- Born: January 19, 1904; Cincinnati, Ohio
- Died: December 24, 1958 (aged 54); Cincinnati, Ohio
- Batted: Right Threw: Right

MLB debut
- June 20, 1926, for the New York Giants

Last MLB appearance
- June 20, 1926, for the New York Giants
- Stats at Baseball Reference

Teams
- New York Giants (1926)

Jimmy "Browntown" Boyle (January 19, 1904 in Cincinnati, Ohio – December 24, 1958 in Cincinnati, Ohio), a catcher for the 1926 New York Giants, has the distinction of having one of the shortest known Major League Baseball careers. Although Boyle is only one of about 900 ballplayers who have played in only a single major league game, he is distinguished by having played for only one inning, the ninth inning of a game against Pittsburgh in June of that year (which the Giants lost 8–0). After three outs, Boyle never got to bat and never played again; he is even further distinguished by having never played in the minors, moving straight to the Giants from college. He asked manager John McGraw for his release and it was granted August 2, 1926.

== Playing History ==
Boyle was called up to New York in the summer of 1926, arriving by Pullman train car. He signed a contract for $250 to play with the Giants, minus a $30 deposit for both his home and away uniforms. His brief career started at the top of the ninth inning when John McGraw sent him to replace Paul Florence behind homeplate at the Polo Grounds. That would be the extent of his career in the Majors.

== Family History ==
Boyle's family emigrated from Ireland in the 1800s and settled in Cincinnati. His father James worked as a brewery truck driver and a fireman.

Jimmy was a second-generation ballplayer (uncommon in an era when there had only been two generations of ball players); his two uncles Jack and Eddie Boyle were catchers for the Phillies and Pirates, respectively. As well, his brother Buzz Boyle played for the Brooklyn Dodgers.

Boyle played football and baseball at Xavier University in Cincinnati; he was class president and enjoyed "feminine companions and Chesterfield cigarettes" according to his yearbook.

He is the grandfather of sportswriter Steve Rushin. His granddaughter remembers seeing his signed Giants contract next to a photo of him in uniform in their house.

Jimmy died of leukemia on Christmas Eve, 1958.

== Sources ==
- Jim Boyle at SABR (Baseball BioProject)
