= Gene Connell =

American baseball player (1906-1937)

- Catcher
- Born: May 10, 1906; Hazleton, Pennsylvania
- Died: August 31, 1937 (aged 31); Waverly, New York
- Batted: Right Threw: Right

MLB debut
- July 4, 1931, for the Philadelphia Phillies

Last MLB appearance
- September 27, 1931, for the Philadelphia Phillies

MLB statistics
- Games played: 6
- At bats: 12
- Hits: 3
- Stats at Baseball Reference

Teams
- Philadelphia Phillies (1931)

Eugene Joseph Connell (May 10, 1906 – August 31, 1937) was an American professional baseball player who played in Major League Baseball for the Philadelphia Phillies in 1931. He was the younger brother of fellow major leaguer Joe Connell.

== Biography ==
A native of Hazleton, Pennsylvania, Connell attended the University of Pennsylvania, where he lettered in basketball and baseball, graduating in 1928. He was captain of Penn's 1928 basketball team, which took the Eastern Intercollegiate Basketball League title, defeating Princeton, 24-22, before a reported 10,000 fans at The Palestra.

From 1927 to 1930, he played summer baseball in the Cape Cod Baseball League (CCBL). Connell played catcher for the CCBL's Falmouth team from 1927 to 1929, clobbering home runs in three consecutive games in 1928, and helping the team to the league pennant in 1929. He returned to the league in 1930 to play for that season's pennant-winning Wareham team. An all-league CCBL selection at catcher, it was reported that Connell "has all the requirements for a big league catcher and is at all times a steady, dependable player who has a pleasing personality to add to his ability as a ball player."

Connell made his major league debut in 1931, and played in six games at catcher for the Phillies during that season. His first appearance came on July 4 when he entered as a late-inning replacement for Phillies catcher Spud Davis in the second game of a doubleheader against the Boston Braves at Braves Field. Connell's first hit came one week later against the New York Giants at the Baker Bowl, when he singled off New York's Clarence Mitchell. On September 14, he singled and scored a run against the eventual World Series champion St. Louis Cardinals and pitcher Allyn Stout at Sportsman's Park. The Cardinals, who boasted a lineup that included Baseball Hall of Famers Jim Bottomley, Chick Hafey, and Frankie Frisch, prevailed over the Phils, 13–5. Connell's final major league appearance was also his only major league start. It came on September 27, when he caught Phils hurler Bob Adams and got a hit off Ben Cantwell in Philadelphia's 12–2 drubbing at the hands of the Braves in Boston. In 12 major league at-bats, Connell recorded three hits and scored one run. He never made an error behind the plate.

Connell died in an automobile accident in Waverly, New York in 1937 at the age of 31.

== Sources ==
- Career statistics from MLB · Baseball Reference · Retrosheet · Baseball Almanac
