= Joe Connell =

American baseball player (1902-1977)

- Pinch hitter
- Born: January 16, 1902; Bethlehem, Pennsylvania
- Died: September 21, 1977 (aged 75); Trexlertown, Pennsylvania
- Batted: Left Threw: Left

MLB debut
- June 15, 1926, for the New York Giants

Last MLB appearance
- June 20, 1926, for the New York Giants

MLB statistics
- At bats: 1
- Hits: 0
- Runs scored: 1
- Stats at Baseball Reference

Teams
- New York Giants (1926)

Joseph Bernard Connell (January 16, 1902 – September 21, 1977) was a pinch hitter in Major League Baseball. He played for the New York Giants. He was the older brother of major leaguer Gene Connell.
