= Monk Sherlock =

American baseball player (1904–1985)

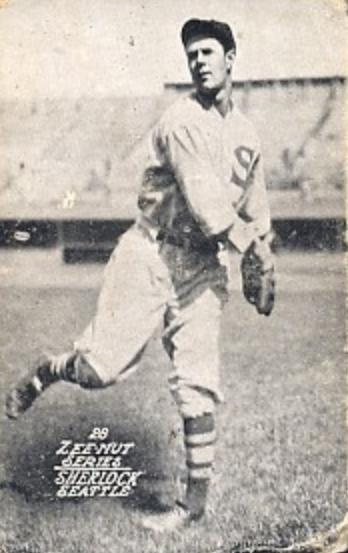
- First baseman
- Born: October 26, 1904; Buffalo, New York, U.S.
- Died: November 26, 1985 (aged 81); Buffalo, New York, U.S.
- Batted: Right Threw: Right

MLB debut
- April 20, 1930, for the Philadelphia Phillies

Last MLB appearance
- September 28, 1930, for the Philadelphia Phillies

MLB statistics
- Batting average: .324
- Home runs: 0
- Runs batted in: 38
- Stats at Baseball Reference

Teams
- Philadelphia Phillies (1930)

John Clinton "Monk" Sherlock (October 26, 1904 – November 26, 1985) was an American professional baseball player. He played one season in Major League Baseball for the 1930 Philadelphia Phillies, primarily as a first baseman. He was also the older brother of Vince Sherlock who appeared in nine games for the 1935 Brooklyn Dodgers. Sherlock was born in Buffalo, New York and died there in 1985.

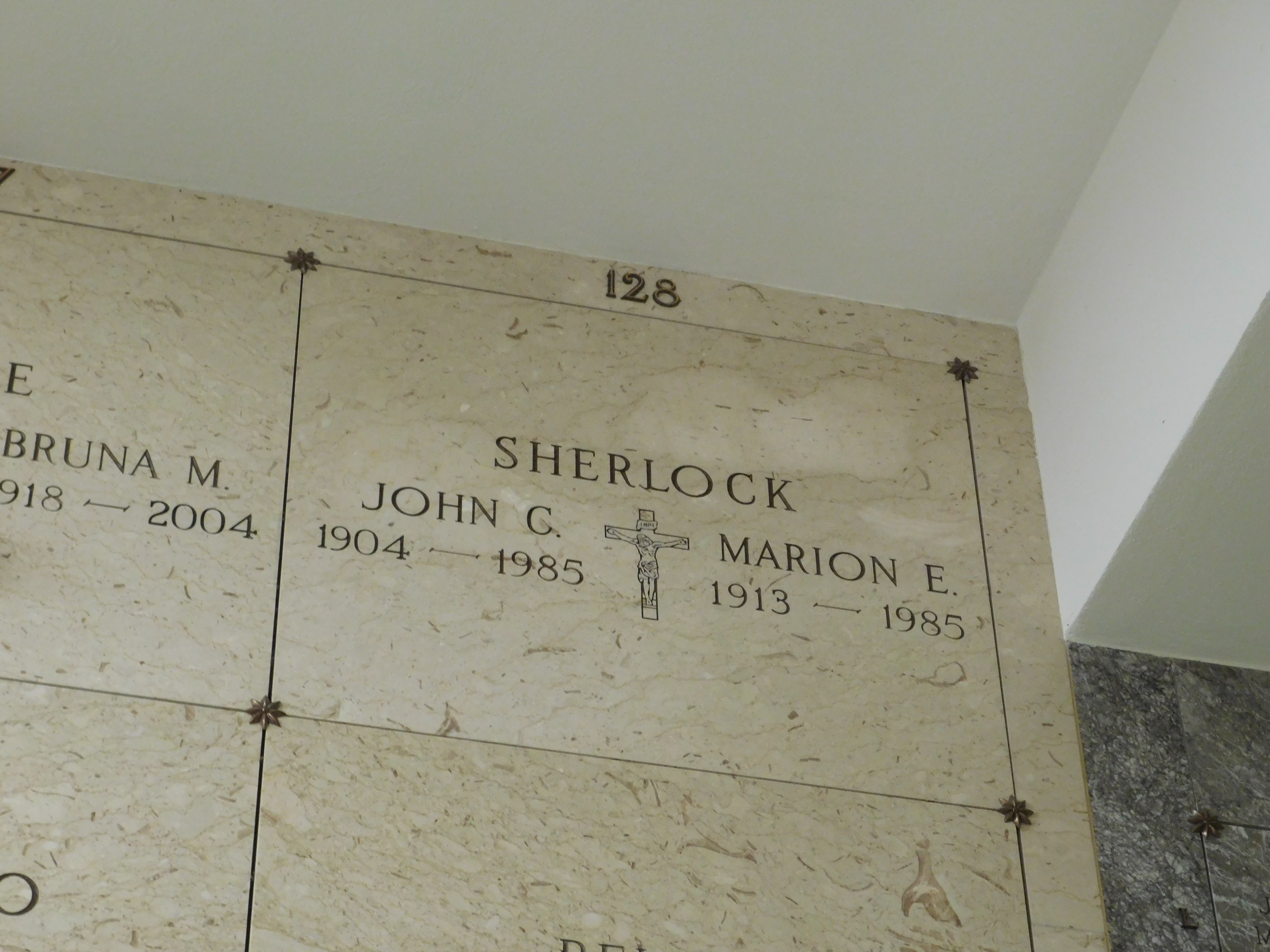
Sherlock's grave at Forest Lawn Cemetery in Buffalo
