= Pete Cote =

American baseball player (1902-1987)

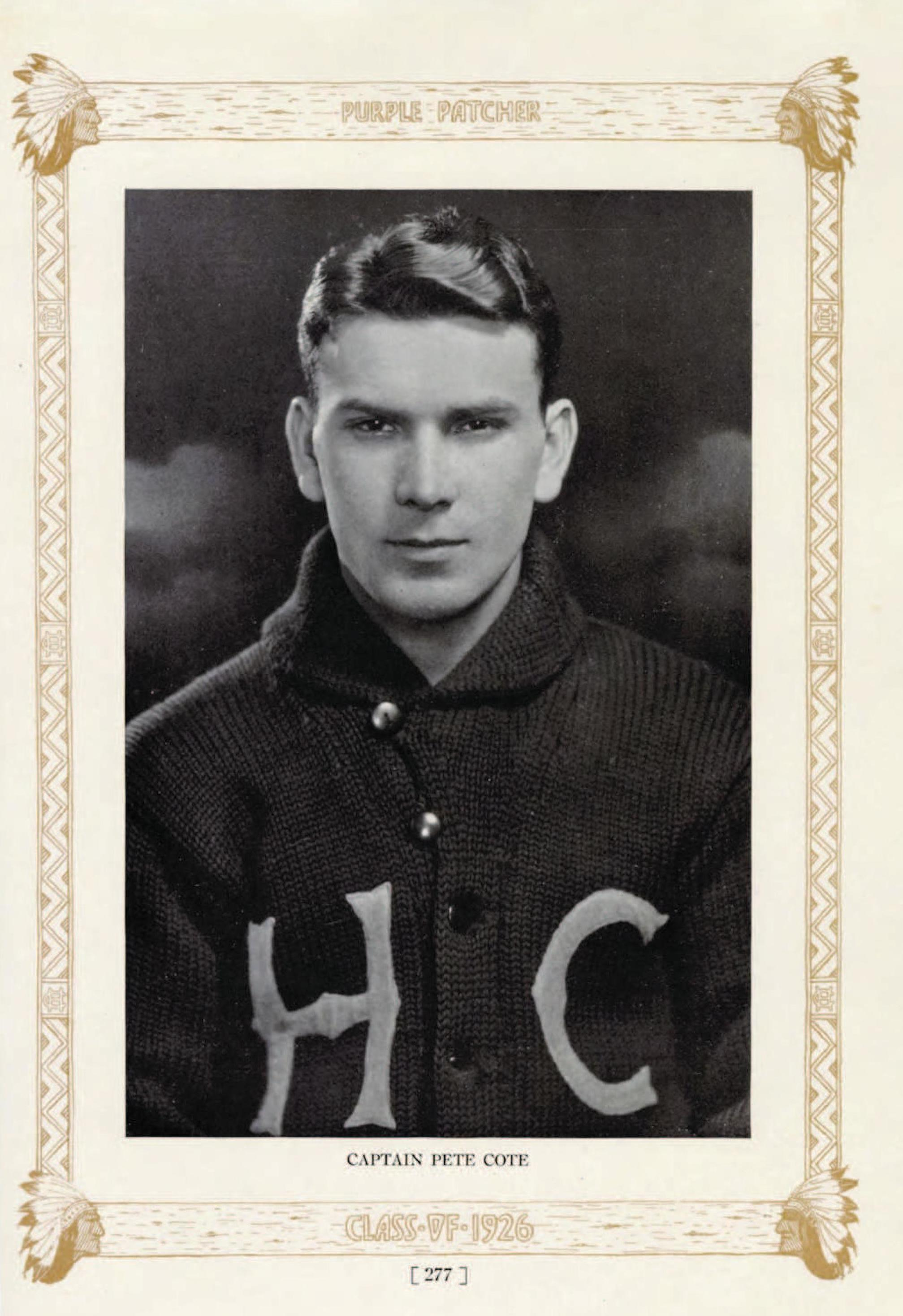
- 1926 yearbook photo, College of the Holy Cross
- Pinch hitter
- Born: August 30, 1902; Cambridge, Massachusetts, U.S.
- Died: October 17, 1987 (aged 85); Middleton, Massachusetts, U.S.
- Batted: Right Threw: Right

MLB debut
- June 18, 1926, for the New York Giants

Last MLB appearance
- June 22, 1926, for the New York Giants
- Stats at Baseball Reference

Teams
- New York Giants (1926)

Warren Peter Cote (August 30, 1902 – October 17, 1987) was an American pinch-hitter in Major League Baseball who appeared in two games for the 1926 New York Giants. A native of Cambridge, Massachusetts, he batted and threw right-handed.

Cote had one at-bat without a hit and also appeared as a pinch-runner.

Cote died in Middleton, Massachusetts, at age 85.
