= Paul Florence =

American baseball player (1900–1986)

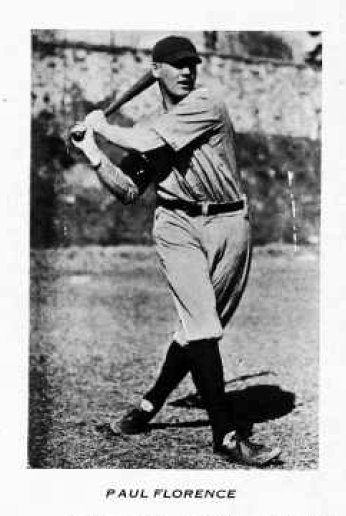
- Florence playing at Georgetown in 1924.
- Catcher
- Born: April 22, 1900; Chicago, Illinois, U.S.
- Died: May 28, 1986 (aged 86); Gainesville, Florida, U.S.
- Batted: Both Threw: Right

MLB debut
- May 21, 1926, for the New York Giants

Last MLB appearance
- September 24, 1926, for the New York Giants

MLB statistics
- Batting average: .229
- Home runs: 2
- Runs batted in: 14
- Stats at Baseball Reference

Teams
- New York Giants (1926)

Paul Robert Florence (April 22, 1900 – May 28, 1986) was a catcher in Major League Baseball who played for the New York Giants in its 1926 season.

== Career ==
Born in Chicago, Illinois, Florence graduated from Georgetown University, where he was a Hall of Fame selection in football, basketball and baseball. He was also a catcher inductee for football and baseball in the Loyola Academy Hall of Fame, as well as the catcher on the Rochester Red Wings all-time roster team, which is considered one of the best in International League history.

In addition to Rochester, Florence caught in the minors for the Baltimore Orioles, Indianapolis Indians and Milwaukee Brewers. In between he played one season with the Chicago Cardinals NFL team.

Afterwards, Florence worked during seven years as the general manager for the Birmingham Barons club of the Southern Association. Besides, he served as the assistant general manager of the Cincinnati Reds and also was one of the main organizers of the Houston Astros franchise in 1962, remaining in the organization as their chief scout until his retirement in 1983 at the age of 83.

Florence died in 1986 in Gainesville, Florida, aged 86.
