= Vince Sherlock =

American baseball player (1910–1997)

- Second baseman
- Born: March 27, 1910; Buffalo, New York, U.S.
- Died: May 11, 1997 (aged 87); Cheektowaga, New York, U.S.
- Batted: Right Threw: Right

MLB debut
- September 18, 1935, for the Brooklyn Dodgers

Last MLB appearance
- September 29, 1935, for the Brooklyn Dodgers

MLB statistics
- Batting average: .462
- Home runs: 0
- Runs batted in: 6
- Stats at Baseball Reference

Teams
- Brooklyn Dodgers (1935)

Vincent Thomas Sherlock (March 27, 1910 – May 11, 1997), nicknamed "Baldy", was an American professional baseball player who played second base for the 1935 Brooklyn Dodgers.

Vince was the brother of fellow major leaguer Monk Sherlock, who played with the Philadelphia Phillies.

Although he hit a very effective .462 (11-for-26) with 4 runs and 6 RBI in nine major league games, he was ineffective as a second baseman, committing four errors in 43 total chances for a .907 fielding percentage.
