= Joe Poetz =

American baseball player (1900-1942)

- Pitcher
- Born: June 22, 1900; St. Louis, Missouri, U.S.
- Died: February 7, 1942 (aged 41); St. Louis, Missouri, U.S.
- Batted: Right Threw: Right

MLB debut
- September 14, 1926, for the New York Giants

Last MLB appearance
- September 22, 1926, for the New York Giants

MLB statistics
- Games pitched: 2
- Innings pitched: 8.0
- Earned run average: 3.38
- Stats at Baseball Reference

Teams
- New York Giants (1926)

Joseph Frank "Bull Montana" Poetz (June 22, 1900 – February 7, 1942) was an American Major League Baseball pitcher who played in two games for the New York Giants in 1926.
