= Ty Tyson (baseball) =

American baseball player (1892–1953)

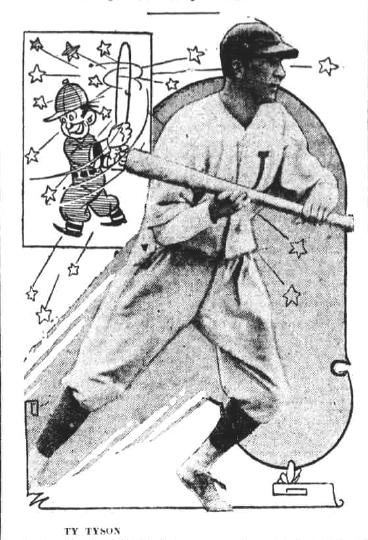
- Outfielder
- Born: June 1, 1892; Wilkes-Barre, Pennsylvania, U.S.
- Died: August 16, 1953 (aged 61); Buffalo, New York, U.S.
- Batted: Right Threw: Right

MLB debut
- April 13, 1926, for the New York Giants

Last MLB appearance
- July 3, 1928, for the Brooklyn Robins

MLB statistics
- Batting average: .280
- Home runs: 5
- Runs batted in: 73
- Stats at Baseball Reference

Teams
- New York Giants (1926–1927); Brooklyn Robins (1928)

Albert Thomas Tyson (June 1, 1892 in Wilkes-Barre, Pennsylvania – August 16, 1953 in Buffalo, New York) was an American outfielder in Major League Baseball who played from 1926 through 1928 for the New York Giants and Brooklyn Robins.
