= Jim Hamby =

American baseball player (1897-1991)

- Catcher
- Born: July 29, 1897; Wilkesboro, North Carolina, U.S.
- Died: October 21, 1991 (aged 94); Springfield, Illinois, U.S.
- Batted: Right Threw: Right

MLB debut
- September 20, 1926, for the New York Giants

Last MLB appearance
- May 27, 1927, for the New York Giants

MLB statistics
- Batting average: .182
- Home runs: 0
- Runs batted in: 5
- Stats at Baseball Reference

Teams
- New York Giants (1926–1927)

James Sanford Hamby (July 29, 1897 – October 21, 1991), nicknamed "Cracker", was an American professional baseball catcher who played in parts of the 1926 and 1927 seasons for the New York Giants. Of his 55 career at bats, 52 came in 1927, when he had a batting average of .192. In 1926, Hamby had three at-bats late in the season without a hit. Hamby played in the minor leagues through 1933, but never appeared in another major league game.
