= Scottie Slayback =

American baseball player

- Second baseman
- Born: October 5, 1901; Paducah, Kentucky, U.S.
- Died: November 30, 1979 (aged 78); Cincinnati, Ohio, U.S.
- Batted: Right Threw: Right

MLB debut
- September 26, 1926, for the New York Giants

Last MLB appearance
- September 26, 1926, for the New York Giants

MLB statistics
- Games played: 2
- At bats: 8
- Hits: 0
- Stats at Baseball Reference

Teams
- New York Giants (1926)

Elbert "Scottie" Slayback (October 5, 1901 – November 30, 1979) was an American second baseman in Major League Baseball. He played for the New York Giants.
