= Mike Smith (1920s outfielder) =

American baseball player (1904-1981)

- Outfielder
- Born: November 16, 1904; Norfolk, Virginia
- Died: May 31, 1981 (aged 76); Chesapeake, Virginia
- Batted: Left Threw: Right

MLB debut
- September 4, 1926, for the New York Giants

Last MLB appearance
- September 20, 1926, for the New York Giants

MLB statistics
- Batting average: .143
- Home runs: 0
- Runs batted in: 0
- Stats at Baseball Reference

Teams
- New York Giants (1926)

Elwood Hope "Mike" Smith (November 16, 1904 in Norfolk, Virginia – May 31, 1981 in Chesapeake, Virginia) was an American outfielder, who played Major League Baseball in 1926 for the New York Giants. Smith attended the College of William & Mary. Smith played 4 major league games in his career, going 1-7 with 2 strikeouts.
