= Al Smith (right-handed pitcher) =

American baseball player (1903-1995)

- Pitcher
- Born: December 13, 1903; Norristown, Pennsylvania
- Died: August 11, 1995 (aged 91); San Diego, California
- Batted: Right Threw: Right

MLB debut
- June 18, 1926, for the New York Giants

Last MLB appearance
- June 18, 1926, for the New York Giants

MLB statistics
- Games pitched: 1
- Earned run average: 9.00
- Innings pitched: 2
- Stats at Baseball Reference

Teams
- New York Giants (1926)

Alfred Kendricks Smith (December 13, 1903 – August 11, 1995) was a Major League Baseball pitcher who played in one game for the New York Giants on June 18, 1926. He pitched in two innings, and allowed two earned runs for an ERA of 9.00 in the Giants' 8–3 loss to the Pittsburgh Pirates.

He died on August 11, 1995, aged 91.
