= 1915 Boston Red Sox season =

Major League Baseball season

1915 Boston Red Sox
- World Series champions American League champions
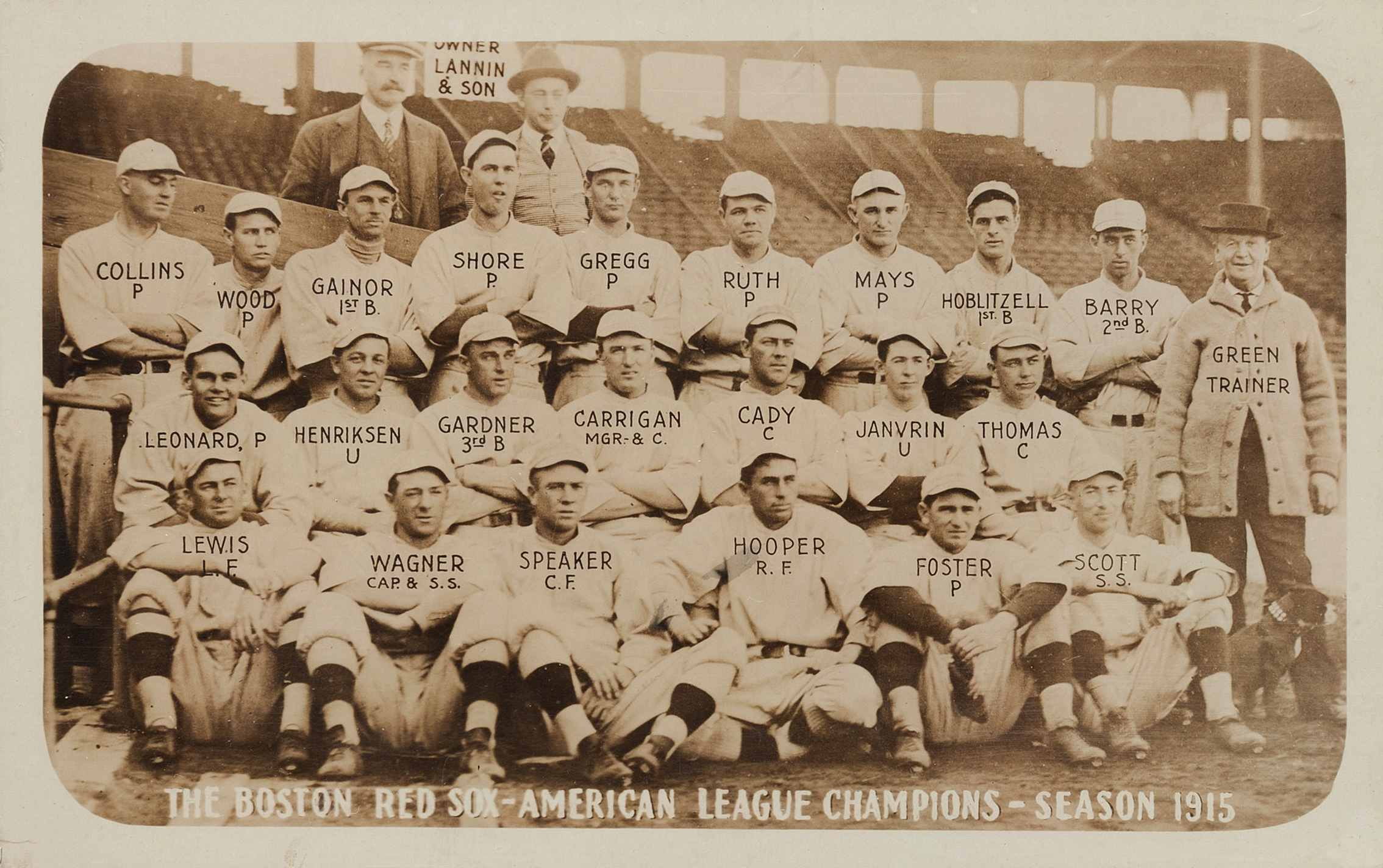
- 1915 Boston Red Sox team photo, with Babe Ruth in the back row
- League: American League
- Ballpark: Fenway Park
- City: Boston, Massachusetts
- Record: 101–50 (.669)
- League place: 1st
- Owners: Joseph Lannin
- Managers: Bill Carrigan
- Stats: ESPN.com; Baseball Reference

The 1915 Boston Red Sox season was the 15th season in the franchise's Major League Baseball history. The Red Sox finished first in the American League (AL) with a record of 101 wins and 50 losses.

The team then faced the National League (NL) champion Philadelphia Phillies in the 1915 World Series, which the Red Sox won in five games to capture the franchise's third World Series. While the Red Sox' home field was Fenway Park, their two home games of the World Series were played at Braves Field, due to its larger seating capacity.

== Regular season ==
=== Opening Day lineup ===
Harry Hooper	RF
Heinie Wagner	2B
Tris Speaker	CF
Duffy Lewis	LF
Dick Hoblitzel	1B
Everett Scott	SS
Larry Gardner	3B
Hick Cady	C
Ernie Shore	P

=== Season standings ===
American League
Team	W	L	Pct.	GB	Home	Road
Boston Red Sox	101	50	.669	—	55‍–‍20	46‍–‍30
Detroit Tigers	100	54	.649	2½	51‍–‍26	49‍–‍28
Chicago White Sox	93	61	.604	9½	54‍–‍24	39‍–‍37
Washington Senators	85	68	.556	17	50‍–‍29	35‍–‍39
New York Yankees	69	83	.454	32½	37‍–‍43	32‍–‍40
St. Louis Browns	63	91	.409	39½	35‍–‍38	28‍–‍53
Cleveland Indians	57	95	.375	44½	27‍–‍50	30‍–‍45
Philadelphia Athletics	43	109	.283	58½	19‍–‍53	24‍–‍56

=== Record vs. opponents ===
1915 American League record Sources:
Team	BOS	CWS	CLE	DET	NYY	PHA	SLB	WSH
Boston	—	12–10	16–4	14–8	10–12	17–5–1	17–5–2	15–6–1
Chicago	10–12	—	16–6	7–15	15–7	19–3	18–4	8–14–1
Cleveland	4–16	6–16	—	5–17	9–13–1	15–7–1	12–10	6–16
Detroit	8–14	15–7	17–5	—	17–5	17–5	13–9–2	13–9
New York	12–10	7–15	13–9–1	5–17	—	11–9	12–10–1	9–13
Philadelphia	5–17–1	3–19	7–15–1	5–17	9–11	—	6–16	8–14
St. Louis	5–17–2	4–18	10–12	9–13–2	10–12–1	16–6	—	9–13
Washington	6–15–1	14–8–1	16–6	9–13	13–9	14–8	13–9	—

=== Roster ===
1915 Boston Red Sox
Roster
Pitchers: Ray Collins; Ralph Comstock; Guy Cooper; Rube Foster; Vean Gregg; Dutch Leonard; Carl Mays; Herb Pennock; Babe Ruth; Ernie Shore; Smoky Joe Wood	Catchers: Hick Cady; Bill Carrigan; Raymond Haley; Pinch Thomas; Infielders: Jack Barry; Del Gainer; Larry Gardner; Dick Hoblitzel; Hal Janvrin; Mike McNally; Bill Rodgers; Everett Scott; Heinie Wagner	Outfielders: Olaf Henriksen; Harry Hooper; Duffy Lewis; Wally Rehg; Chick Shorten; Tris Speaker	Manager: Bill Carrigan

== Player stats ==
=== Batting ===
==== Starters by position ====
Note: Pos = Position; G = Games played; AB = At bats; H = Hits; Avg. = Batting average; HR = Home runs; RBI = Runs batted in

Pos	Player	G	AB	H	Avg.	HR	RBI
C	Hick Cady	78	205	57	.278	0	17
1B	Dick Hoblitzell	124	399	113	.283	2	61
2B	Jack Barry	78	248	65	.262	0	26
SS	Everett Scott	100	359	72	.201	0	28
3B	Larry Gardner	127	430	111	.258	1	55
OF	Duffy Lewis	152	557	162	.291	2	76
OF	Harry Hooper	149	566	133	.235	2	51
OF	Tris Speaker	150	547	176	.322	0	69

==== Other batters ====
Note: G = Games played; AB = At bats; H = Hits; Avg. = Batting average; HR = Home runs; RBI = Runs batted in

Player	G	AB	H	Avg.	HR	RBI
Hal Janvrin	99	316	85	.269	0	37
Heinie Wagner	84	267	64	.240	0	29
Pinch Thomas	86	203	48	.236	0	21
Del Gainer	82	200	59	.295	1	29
Bill Carrigan	46	95	19	.200	0	7
Olaf Henriksen	73	92	18	.196	0	13
Mike McNally	23	53	8	.151	0	0
Chick Shorten	6	14	3	.214	0	0
Raymond Haley	5	7	1	.143	0	0
Bill Rodgers	11	6	0	.000	0	0
Wally Rehg	5	5	1	.200	0	0

=== Pitching ===
==== Starting pitchers ====
Note: G = Games pitched; IP = Innings pitched; W = Wins; L = Losses; ERA = Earned run average; SO = Strikeouts

Player	G	IP	W	L	ERA	SO
Rube Foster	37	255.0	19	8	2.11	82
Ernie Shore	38	247.0	19	8	1.64	102
Babe Ruth	32	217.2	18	8	2.44	112
Dutch Leonard	32	183.1	15	7	2.36	116
Smoky Joe Wood	25	157.1	15	5	1.49	63

==== Other pitchers ====
Note: G = Games pitched; IP = Innings pitched; W = Wins; L = Losses; ERA = Earned run average; SO = Strikeouts

Player	G	IP	W	L	ERA	SO
Carl Mays	38	131.2	6	5	2.60	65
Ray Collins	25	104.2	4	7	4.30	43
Vean Gregg	18	75.0	4	2	3.36	43
Herb Pennock	5	14.0	0	0	9.64	7

==== Relief pitchers ====
Note: G = Games pitched; W = Wins; L = Losses; SV = Saves; ERA = Earned run average; SO = Strikeouts

Player	G	W	L	SV	ERA	SO
Ralph Comstock	3	1	0	0	2.00	1
Guy Cooper	1	0	0	0	0.00	0

== 1915 World Series ==
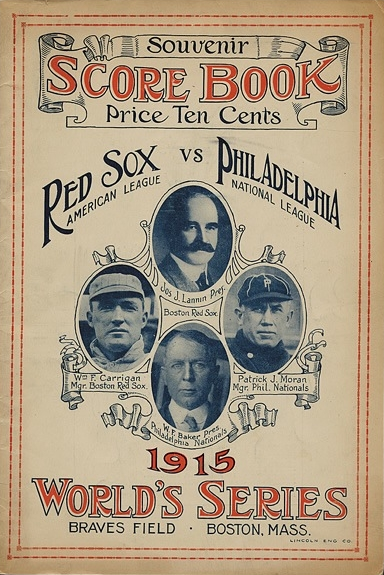
Score Book, 1915 World Series at Braves Field, Boston

AL Boston Red Sox (4) vs. NL Philadelphia Phillies (1)

Game	Score	Date	Location	Attendance
1	Red Sox – 1, Phillies – 3	October 8	National League Park	19,343
2	Red Sox – 2, Phillies – 1	October 9	National League Park	20,306
3	Phillies – 1, Red Sox – 2	October 11	Braves Field	42,300
4	Phillies – 1, Red Sox – 2	October 12	Braves Field	41,096
5	Red Sox – 5, Phillies – 4	October 13	National League Park	20,306
