= Del Gainer =

American baseball player (1886–1947)

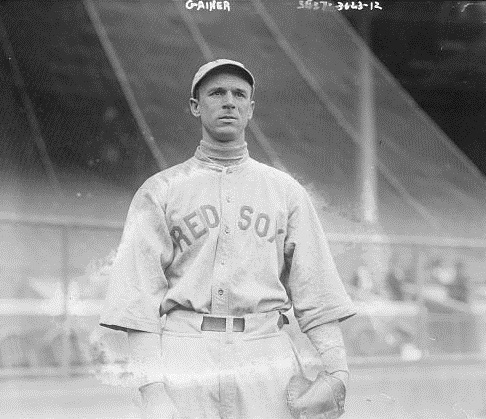
- Del Gainer with the Boston Red Sox
- First baseman
- Born: November 10, 1886; Montrose, West Virginia, U.S.
- Died: January 29, 1947 (aged 60); Elkins, West Virginia, U.S.
- Batted: Right Threw: Right

MLB debut
- October 2, 1909, for the Detroit Tigers

Last MLB appearance
- September 30, 1922, for the St. Louis Cardinals

MLB statistics
- Batting average: .272
- Home runs: 14
- Runs batted in: 190
- Stats at Baseball Reference

Teams
- Detroit Tigers (1909, 1911–1914); Boston Red Sox (1914–1917, 1919); St. Louis Cardinals (1922)

Career highlights and awards
- 2× World Series champion (1915, 1916)

Dellos Clinton Gainer (November 10, 1886 – January 29, 1947), nicknamed "Sheriff," was an American baseball player.

A native of West Virginia, Gainer played professional baseball, primarily as a first baseman, for 21 years from 1909 to 1929, including 10 seasons in Major League Baseball for the Detroit Tigers (1909, 1911-1914), Boston Red Sox (1914-1917, 1919), and St. Louis Cardinals (1922). In his first full year in the major leagues, he drew praise for his fielding and had been batting .302 when he was struck by a pitched ball and sustained a broken wrist. Gainer suffered from the wrist injury and other injuries over the next several seasons.

In 1914, Gainer was sold to the Boston Red Sox. He played for Boston teams that won the World Series in consecutive seasons in 1915 and 1916. He had the third highest batting average on the Red Sox in 1915 (a .295 average trailing only Tris Speaker and Babe Ruth) and second highest in 1917 (a .308 batting average second only to Ruth). He had the game-winning hit in the 14th inning of Game 2 of the 1916 World Series. He spent the 1918 season in the United States Navy during World War I and compiled a .251 batting average in two major league seasons following his discharge. In 10 major league seasons, Gainer appeared in 548 games, 444 of them at first base, and compiled a .272 batting average.

== Early years ==
Gainer was born in Montrose, West Virginia, in 1886. As a young man, he worked as a carpenter in Elkins, West Virginia, and played baseball as a shortstop in Elkins.

He began playing professional baseball for $80 a month with the Grafton, West Virginia, team in the newly formed Pennsylvania–West Virginia League. His fielding was not adequate at the shortstop position, and he was moved to first base. He drew attention, however, for his batting, compiling a .317 batting average in 74 games for the Grafton team.

== Professional baseball ==
=== Detroit Tigers ===
In early August 1909, Gainer was purchased from Grafton by the Detroit Tigers. He made his major league debut with the Detroit Tigers on October 2, 1909. He appeared in two games for the 1909 Tigers and had two hits and two strikeouts in five at bats. In 1910, Gainer was farmed out to the Fort Wayne Billikens in the Central League. The deal required Fort Wayne to pay $500 for Gainer and allowed Detroit to buy him back at the end of the season for the same sum. He appeared in 136 games for Fort Wayne and compiled a .311 batting average in 489 at bats. On September 26, 1910, the Tigers exercised their option to recall Gainer, though he did not appear in any games with Detroit during the 1910 season.

In 1911, Gainer appeared in 70 games for the Tigers, 69 of them as a first baseman, and compiled a .302 batting average in 248 at bats. Early in the season, one press report noted that "his fielding is making him the sensation of the American League." The 1911 Tigers opened the season with a phenomenal 21–2 record, and manager Hughie Jennings in May 1911 credited Gainer with significantly improving the club at first base. Jennings noted:

"This boy is an ideal player. . . . He abides by every rule of nature. He will always be in condition to play his best. There is something else about Gainer that you must appreciate. He does not think no one can tell him a thing. He is anxious to get all the pointers he can and he pays attention to advice and does his best to follow it. Not alone does he hit, but he hits in pinches and his hits are the kind that win ball games."

Another account credited Gainer with "brilliant" play at first base and noted that he was becoming "invaluable" to the Tigers. However, on May 20, 1911, Gainer was lost to the Tigers when he was struck by a pitch thrown by Jack Coombs and sustained a broken right wrist. In late July, Gainer was cleared to play in an emergency situation, but he was sidelined again in August 1911 when it was determined that a callous had formed between the bones in his wrist. In September 1911, it was reported that Gainer would probably undergo surgery and that "his injury was so bad that his arm may never get back into right condition again." Detroit club owner Frank Navin explained the collapse of the 1911 Tigers as follows: "It was the loss of Gainer. He was the cog that we had needed to fix the infield right for two years. He gave the infield the confidence that inspired sharp and fast fielding, and made the pitching job comparatively easy. The minute he was put out with a broken arm that confidence was lost, and the team began to slip."

During the off-season between the 1911 and 1912 seasons, Gainer saw the famed trainer "Bonesetter" Reese who concluded that Gainer was making fine progress and would fully recover. However, the problems with his wrist worsened as the season progressed. In March 1912, Gainer reported to spring training with his wrist still slightly stiff. He compounded his physical problems with an ankle injury on May 4, 1912. In June 1912, he was reported to be planning to have his wrist re-broken by a doctor at Johns Hopkins Hospital, and in July 1912 he was diagnosed with a tumor on his broken wrist. He appeared in only 52 games in 1912 and struggled at bat, hitting .240 in 52 games.

In January 1913, Gainer reported that his wrist was finally healed. He appeared in 105 games, 98 as the Tigers' starting first baseman, though he was benched for a time in May 1913 after concerns were raised that he had "lost his nerve and his batting eye at the same time." He compiled a .267 batting average in 363 at bats.

In October 1913, the Tigers had a promising young first baseman in Wally Pipp, and one newspaper reported that Gainer was "about through as a major league player." In December 1913, Gainer wrote from his home in Elkins, West Virginia, that he may retire from baseball altogether and go into business. He indicated that he no longer enjoyed baseball and that he had purchased a bowling alley in Elkins and was making money at that venture. He received a $20,000 offer to play in the Federal League and used that offer to make an ultimatum to the Red Sox. In early February, he signed a three-year contract with Boston that made him one of the highest paid players in baseball.

=== Boston Red Sox ===
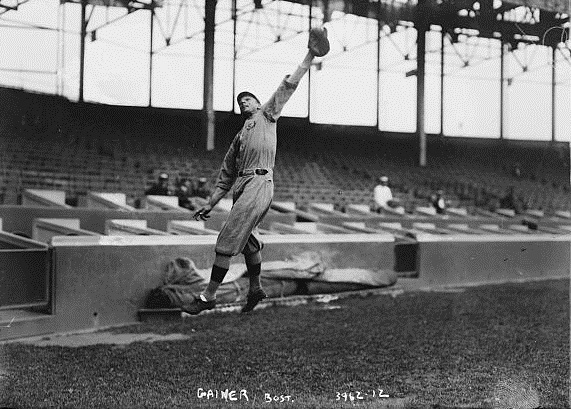
Del Gainer, Boston Red Sox, 1915

On April 8, 1914, the Boston Red Sox made a cash offer to purchase Gainer, but Detroit manager Hughie Jennings said he would wait until the season was underway before deciding on the offer. Gainer stated that he did not want to leave Detroit, but would prefer to be a starter in Boston rather than sit on the bench in Detroit. Jennings wanted to wait to see if George Burns would pan out as a starting first baseman before dealing Gainer. Accordingly, Gainer sat on the bench for the first month of the season, without a plate appearance, while Burns established himself. Finally, on May 24, 1914, the Tigers sold Gainer to the Red Sox in a cash transaction. He played five seasons in Boston from 1914 to 1917 and 1919.

In 1914, his first year with Boston, Gainer continued to have problems with his arm and again visited Bonesetter Reese in June 1914. He also continued to struggle as a batter, and the Red Sox asked compiling a .238 batting average. In July 1920, the Red Sox acquired Dick Hoblitzel who became the club's starting first baseman, and asked waivers on Gainer. Gainer remained with the Red Sox but started only 10 games at first base. In August 1914, the Red Sox tried switching Gainer to second base, and he started 10 games at that position. In December 1914, the Red Sox denied rumors that they intended to trade Gainer; owner Joseph Lannin said at the time that he firmly believed Gainer had recovered his health and would be a big asset in 1915.

In 1915, Red Sox manager Bill Carrigan chose to platoon Gainer and Hoblitzel at first base with Gainer starting 43 games and Hoblitzel 112 at the position. It was a great success, as the two had a combined OPS+ of 131, helping the Red Sox win 101 games and the pennant. In all, Gainer appeared in 82 games, six as an outfielder, and hit .295 with eight triples and 29 RBIs for the 1915 Red Sox team that won the World Series. Gainer had the third highest batting average for the Red Sox — trailing only Tris Speaker and Babe Ruth. He appeared in Game 5 in the 1915 World Series, got a base hit off Eppa Rixey in the eighth inning, and scored on a Duffy Lewis home run that tied the score, with the Red Sox then winning the game on a Harry Hooper home run in the ninth inning. In November 1915, Gainer was honored with a banquet in his hometown of Elkins, West Virginia.

In April 1916, rumors spread that Gainer, who had not yet reported, was quitting baseball to take a job with a railroad. In late April 1916, he wired the team that he would report on May 5 or 6 and be ready to play. When Gainer did report, he again played behind Hoblitzel at first base, with Hoblitzel starting 113 games at the position and Gainer 39. He compiled a .254 batting average during the regular season in 159 at bats. In the 14th inning of Game 2 of the 1916 World Series, he had a pinch-hit single to drive in the winning run to end the longest game in World Series history, and win the game for pitcher Babe Ruth. In the 1915 and 1916 World Series, Gainer hit a combined .500, getting two hits in four at-bats.

In 1917, Gainer remained a backup to Hoblitzel at first base, starting only 44 games. However, his .308 batting average was the second highest on the Red Sox, trailing only Babe Ruth. Gainer and Ruth were also the only Red Sox players with a slugging percentage above .400.

In November 1917, Gainer enlisted the United States Navy as a first class yeoman. He was assigned to the Boston Navy Yard along with teammates Jack Barry and Chick Shorten. During the summer of 1918, he played for an Atlantic Fleet baseball team that included Rabbit Maranville, Whitey Witt, and Paddy Driscoll.

On March 4, 1919, after being discharged from the Navy, Gainer signed a contract to return to the Red Sox; Dick Hoblitzel was released by the Red Sox at the same time. Gainer appeared in 47 games for the Red Sox in 1919, including 15 as a starter at first base and 14 in left field. His batting average dropped to .237.

=== Milwaukee Brewers ===
On December 24, 1919, the Red Sox sold Gainer to the Milwaukee Brewers in the American Association. He compiled a .386 batting average and .583 slugging percentage in 37 games and 127 at bats during the 1920 season. In 1921, he became a starting outfielder for the Brewers, appearing in 134 games at the position and compiling a .340 batting average in 529 at bats.

=== St. Louis Cardinals ===
Gainer was sold on December 10, 1921, by Milwaukee to the St. Louis Cardinals. During the 1922 season, Gainer appeared in only 43 games, 21 as a starting first baseman and five as a starting outfielder, and compiled a .268 batting average in 97 at bats. On September 30, 1922, Gainer hit a three-run home run in his final major league at bat. He was released unconditionally by the Cardinals on January 24, 1924.

=== Minor leagues ===
Gainer continued to play in the minor leagues. From 1924 to 1926, he played in the Texas League for the Houston Buffaloes. He compiled batting averages of .350 and .328 in 1924 and 1925. In May 1926, he was traded by the Houston club to the Syracuse Stars as part of a multi-player deal. He spent the 1926 and 1927 seasons with Syracuse and compiled a .329 average in 1927.

He spent the 1928 season as a coach and pinch-hitter for the Rochester Red Wings of the International League, compiling a .328 average in 61 at bats. He was released by Rochester on November 20, 1928.

In March 1929, he signed as a coach with the Baltimore Orioles. He was also used as a pinch-hitter by the Orioles, appearing in 33 games at age 42 and compiling a .344 batting average in 33 at bats.

In January 1930, Gainer was hired as the manager of the Fairmont Black Diamonds in the Middle Atlantic League. He resigned as manager on July 5, 1930. According to one account, he was "well liked by fans, but poor health and a seven-game losing streak discouraged him to such an extent that he gave up the reins."

== Later years ==
After retiring from baseball, Gainer worked as a deputy U. S. Marshall in West Virginia. He was married in August 1937 to Pauline Edwards, the secretary to the judge in the courtroom where Gainer was assigned. They had a daughter, Barbara Ellen "Bobbi" Gainer. He died suddenly in January 1947 at age 60 after being stricken at his home in Elkins, West Virginia. The cause of death was reported by The Sporting News to have been a "sudden heart seizure".
