= List of Boston Red Sox managers =

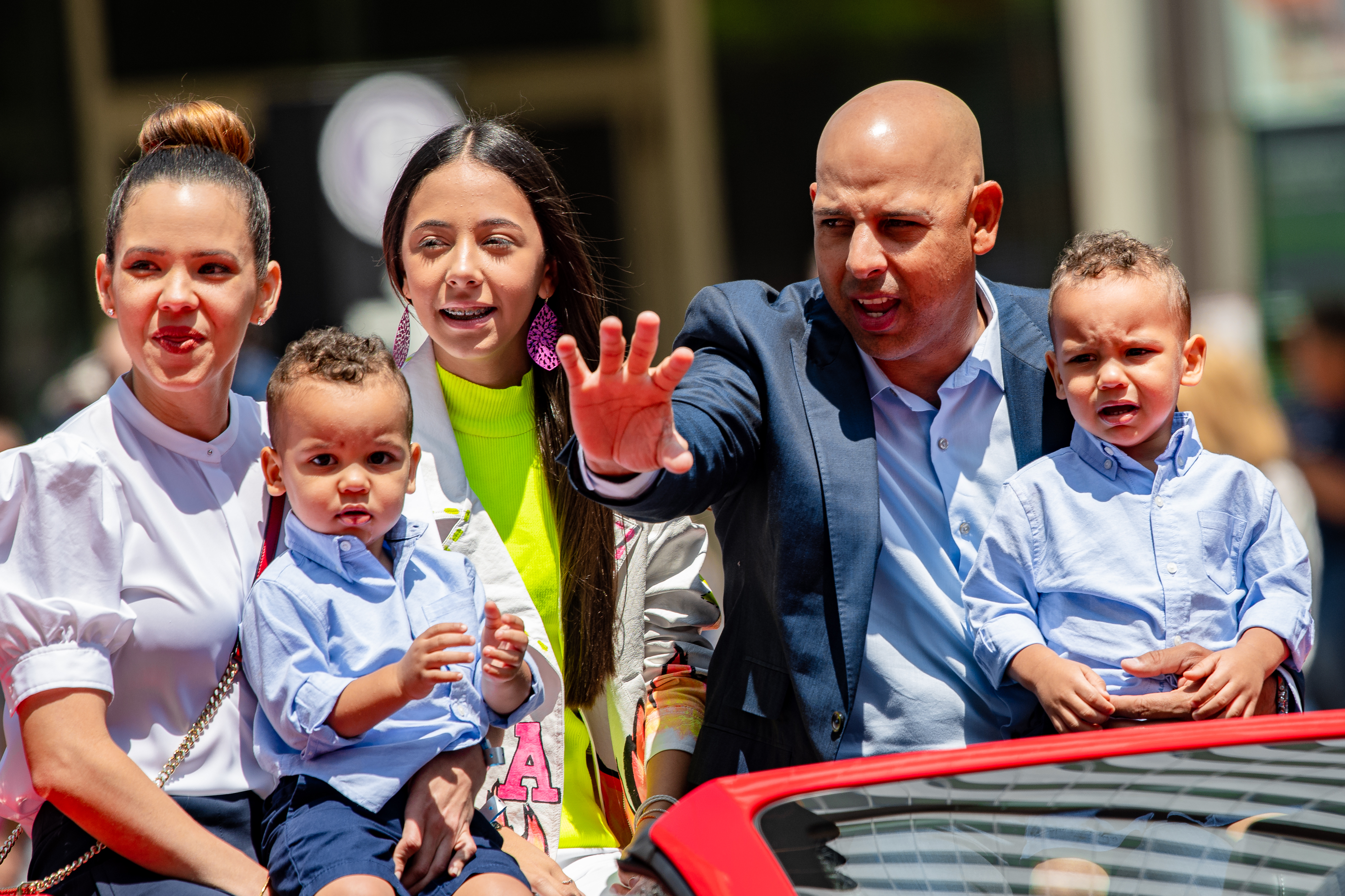
Alex Cora (waving) is the most recent manager to lead the Red Sox to a World Series championship.

The Boston Red Sox are a professional baseball team based in Boston, Massachusetts. The Red Sox are members of the American League (AL) East Division in Major League Baseball (MLB). They have competed since 1901, initially as the Boston Americans (1901–1907), and under their current name since 1908. Since 1912, the Red Sox have played their home games at Fenway Park. In baseball, the head coach of a team is called the manager, or more formally, the field manager. There have been 49 different managers in franchise history; the current manager is Chad Tracy, who was named the interim manager following the firing of Alex Cora on April 25, 2026, and named the full time manager on September 22, 2026.

Jimmy Collins was the first manager of the franchise, managing from 1901 to 1906. Among all Red Sox managers, Joe Cronin managed the most regular season games (2,007) and registered the most regular season wins (1,071), while Terry Francona managed the most playoff games (45) and registered the most playoff wins (28). The most World Series championships won by a Red Sox manager is two, accomplished by Bill Carrigan (1915 and 1916) and Francona (2004 and 2007). John McNamara and Jimy Williams are the only two Red Sox managers to win the AL Manager of the Year Award, in 1986 and 1999, respectively.

== Key ==
No.	Number of managers (Note: A running count of the total number of managers of the Red Sox; any person who returned as manager is counted only once.)
GM	Games managed (includes ties)
W	Wins
L	Losses
Win %	Winning percentage (Note: Winning percentages in baseball are computed using only wins and losses; ties are excluded.)
*	Inducted to the Baseball Hall of Fame
Bold name	Inducted to the Boston Red Sox Hall of Fame

== Managers ==
The below table summarizes the franchise's managerial records since 1901, its inaugural season in the American League. Note that the number of games managed (GM) may exceed the sum of wins and losses, due to tie games that were later replayed; for example, Jimmy Collins had a regular season managerial record of 455–376, which sums to 831, 11 less than the 842 total regular season games that he managed.

Statistics updated through April 25, 2026.

No.	Name	Term	Regular season				Postseason			Achievements	Ref.
No.	Name	Term	GM	W	L	Win %	GM	W	L	Achievements	Ref.
1	Jimmy Collins*	1901–1906	842	455	376	.548	8	5	3	1 World Series Championship (1903)	
2	Chick Stahl	1906	40	14	26	.350	—	—	—		
3	Cy Young*	1907	6	3	3	.500	—	—	—		
4	George Huff	1907	8	2	6	.250	—	—	—		
5	Bob Unglaub	1907	29	9	20	.310	—	—	—		
6	Deacon McGuire	1907–1908	227	98	123	.443	—	—	—		
7	Fred Lake	1908–1909	192	110	80	.579	—	—	—		
8	Patsy Donovan	1910–1911	311	159	147	.520	—	—	—		
9	Jake Stahl	1912–1913	235	144	88	.621	8†	4	3	1 World Series Championship (1912)	
10	Bill Carrigan	1913–1916	540	323	205	.612	10	8	2	2 World Series Championships (1915, 1916)	
11	Jack Barry	1917	157	90	62	.592	—	—	—		
12	Ed Barrow*	1918–1920	418	213	203	.512	6	4	2	1 World Series Championship (1918)	
13	Hugh Duffy*	1921–1922	308	136	172	.442	—	—	—		
14	Frank Chance*	1923	154	61	91	.401	—	—	—		
15	Lee Fohl	1924–1926	463	160	299	.349	—	—	—		
—	Bill Carrigan	1927–1929	463	166	295	.360	—	—	—		
16	Heinie Wagner	1930	154	52	102	.338	—	—	—		
17	Shano Collins	1931–1932	208	73	134	.353	—	—	—		
18	Marty McManus	1932–1933	248	95	153	.383	—	—	—		
19	Bucky Harris*	1934	153	76	76	.500	—	—	—		
20	Joe Cronin*	1935–1947	2,007	1,071	916	.539	7	3	4	1946 American League pennant	
21	Joe McCarthy*	1948–1950	369	223	145	.606	—	—	—		
22	Steve O'Neill	1950–1951	249	150	99	.602	—	—	—		
23	Lou Boudreau*	1952–1954	463	229	232	.497	—	—	—		
24	Pinky Higgins	1955–1959	691	360	329	.522	—	—	—		
25	Rudy York	1959	1	0	1	.000	—	—	—		
26	Billy Jurges	1959–1960	122	59	63	.484	—	—	—		
27	Del Baker	1960	7	2	5	.286	—	—	—		
—	Pinky Higgins	1960–1962	428	200	227	.468	—	—	—		
28	Johnny Pesky	1963–1964	321	146	175	.455	—	—	—		
29	Billy Herman*	1964–1966	310	128	182	.413	—	—	—		
30	Pete Runnels	1966	16	8	8	.500	—	—	—		
31	Dick Williams*	1967–1969	477	260	217	.545	7	3	4	1967 American League pennant	
32	Eddie Popowski	1969	9	5	4	.556	—	—	—		
33	Eddie Kasko	1970–1973	640	345	295	.539	—	—	—		
—	Eddie Popowski	1973	1	1	0	1.000	—	—	—		
34	Darrell Johnson	1974–1976	408	220	188	.539	10	6	4	1975 American League pennant	
35	Don Zimmer	1976–1980	715	411	304	.575	—	—	—		
—	Johnny Pesky	1980	5	1	4	.200	—	—	—		
36	Ralph Houk	1981–1984	594	312	282	.525	—	—	—		
37	John McNamara	1985–1988	571	297	273	.521	14	7	7	1986 AL Manager of the Year; 1986 American League pennant	
38	Joe Morgan	1988–1991	563	301	262	.535	8	0	8		
39	Butch Hobson	1992–1994	439	207	232	.472	—	—	—		
40	Kevin Kennedy	1995–1996	306	171	135	.559	3	0	3		
41	Jimy Williams	1997–2001	766	414	352	.540	14	5	9	1999 AL Manager of the Year	
42	Joe Kerrigan	2001	43	17	26	.395	—	—	—		
43	Grady Little	2002–2003	324	188	136	.580	12	6	6		
44	Terry Francona	2004–2011	1,296	744	552	.574	45	28	17	2 World Series Championships (2004, 2007)	
45	Bobby Valentine	2012	162	69	93	.426	—	—	—		
46	John Farrell	2013–2017	810	432	378	.533	23	12	11	1 World Series Championship (2013)	
47	Alex Cora	2018–2019	324	192	132	.593	14	11	3	1 World Series Championship (2018)	
48	Ron Roenicke	2020	60	24	36	.400	—	—	—		
—	Alex Cora ‡	2021–2026	837	428	409	.511	14	7	7		
49	Chad Tracy	2026–present	135	77	58	.570	2	0	2		

† One game of the 1912 World Series ended in a tie and was replayed.
‡ Included in Cora's record are six games managed by Will Venable in 2022, and a game managed by Ramón Vázquez on May 19, 2025. Cora's overall regular-season record with the Red Sox, for his two stints as manager, stands at 620–541 (.534).

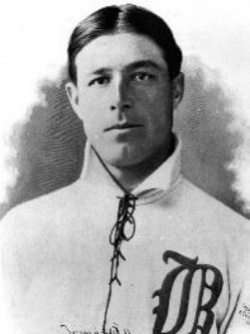
Jimmy Collins was the first manager in franchise history, when the team was known as the Boston Americans.

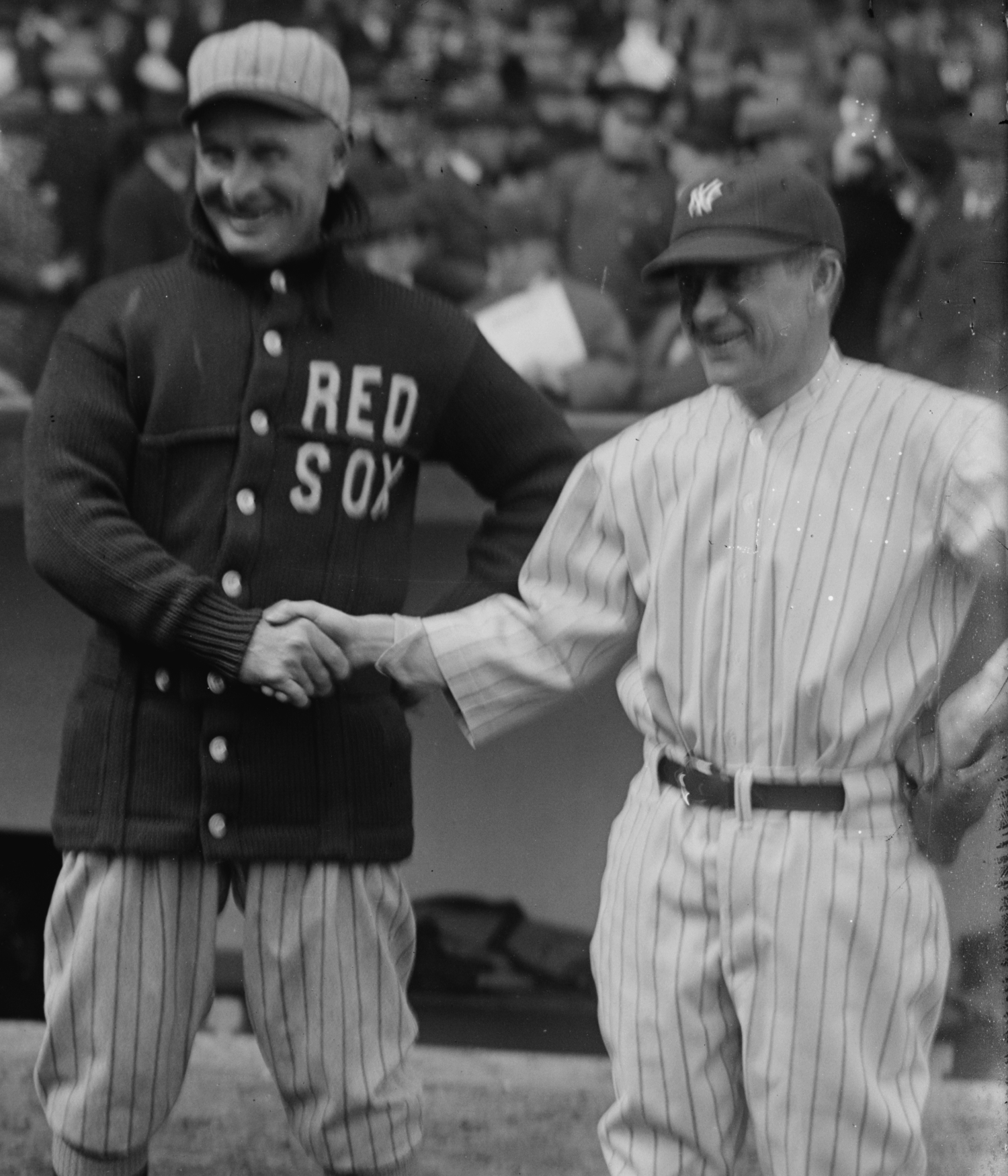
Frank Chance (left), shown with Miller Huggins, managed the team in 1923.

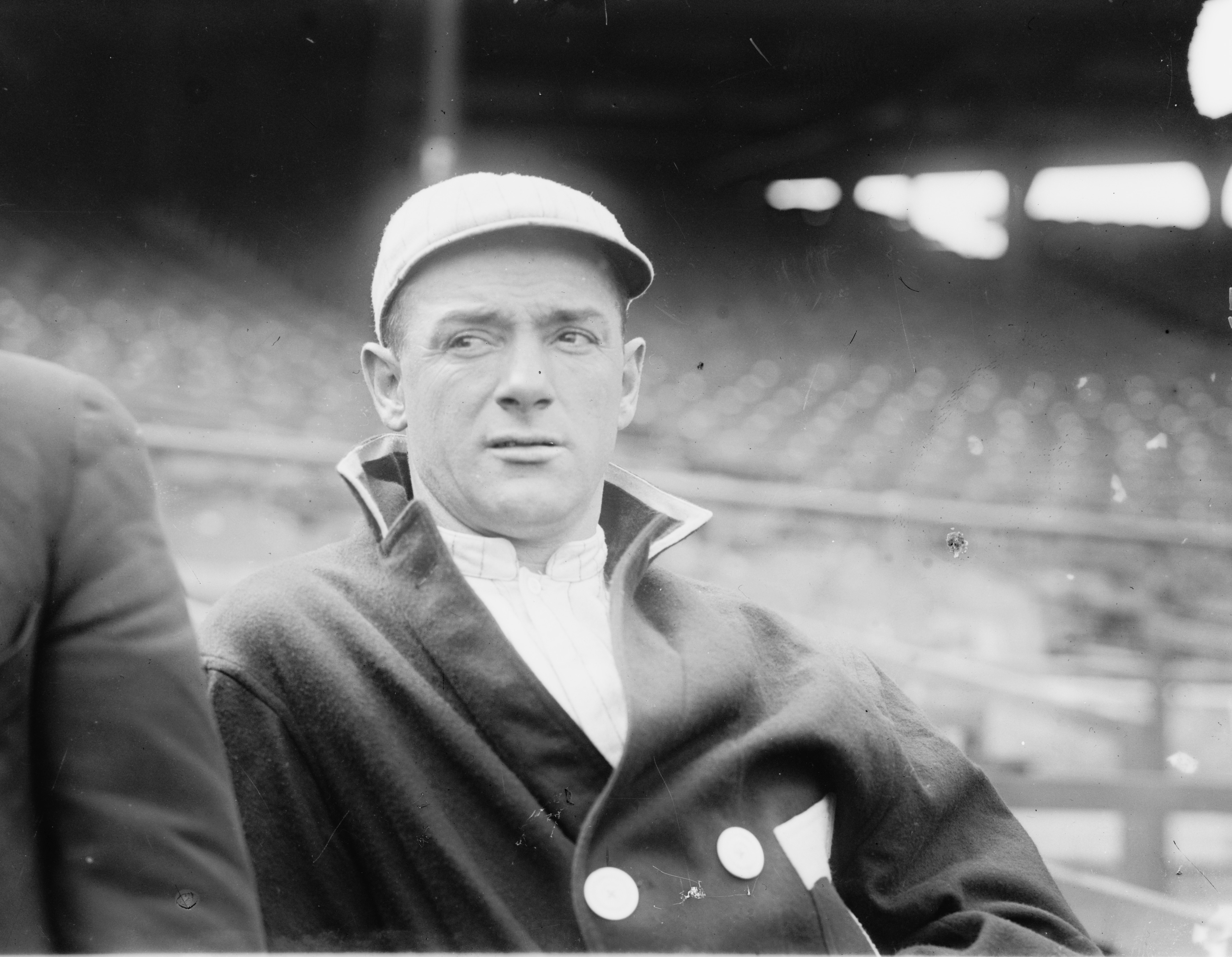
Heinie Wagner managed the team for the 1930 season.

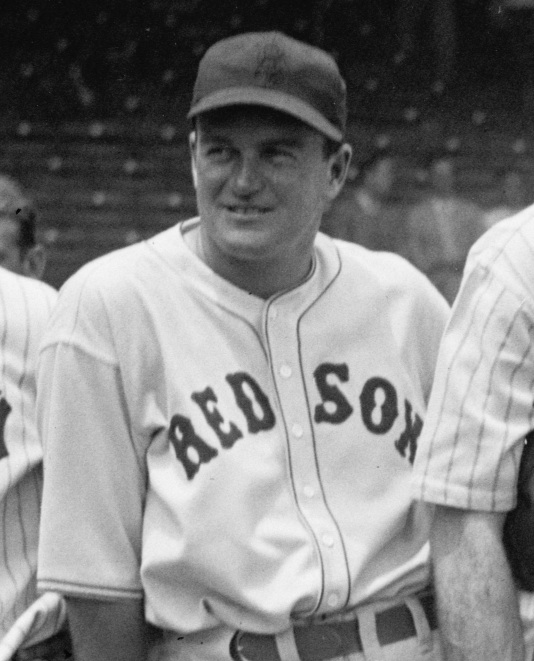
Joe Cronin managed the team from 1935 to 1947, and is the all-time wins leader among Red Sox managers.

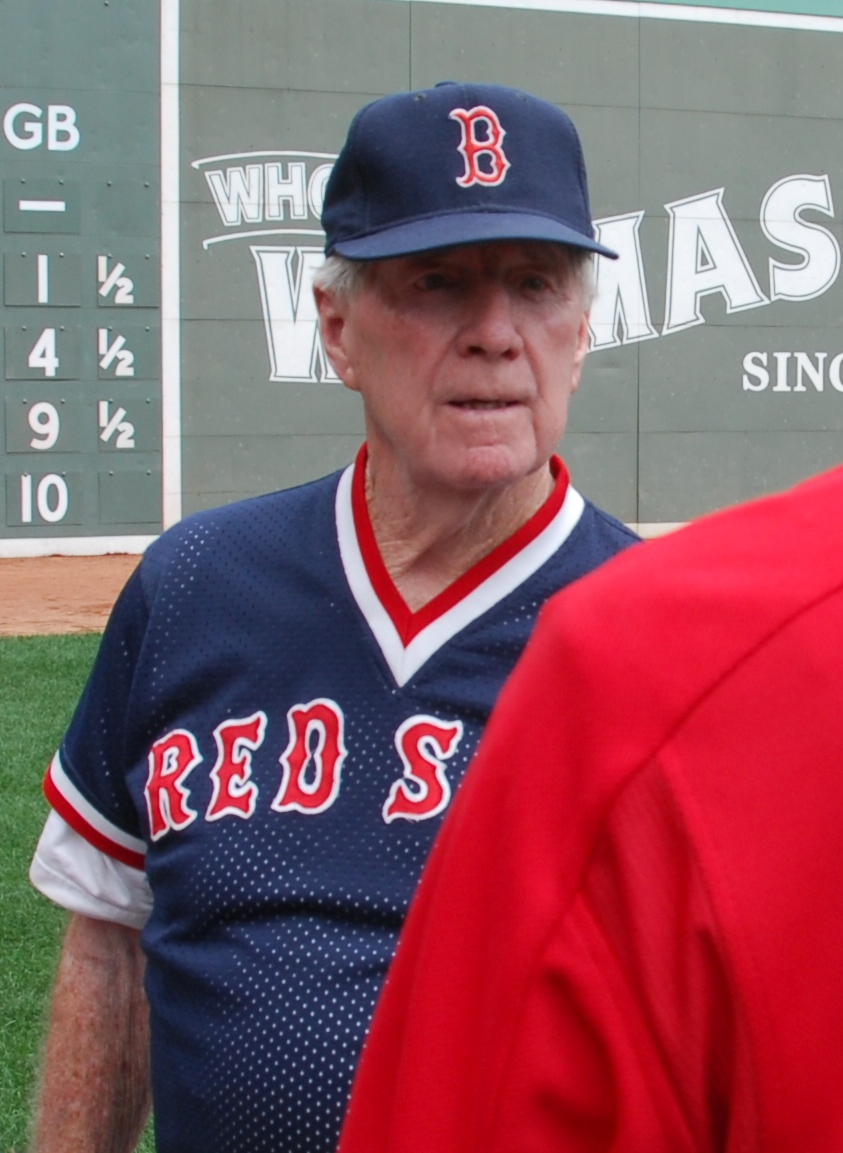
Joe Morgan led the Red Sox to two American League East titles in four seasons as manager.

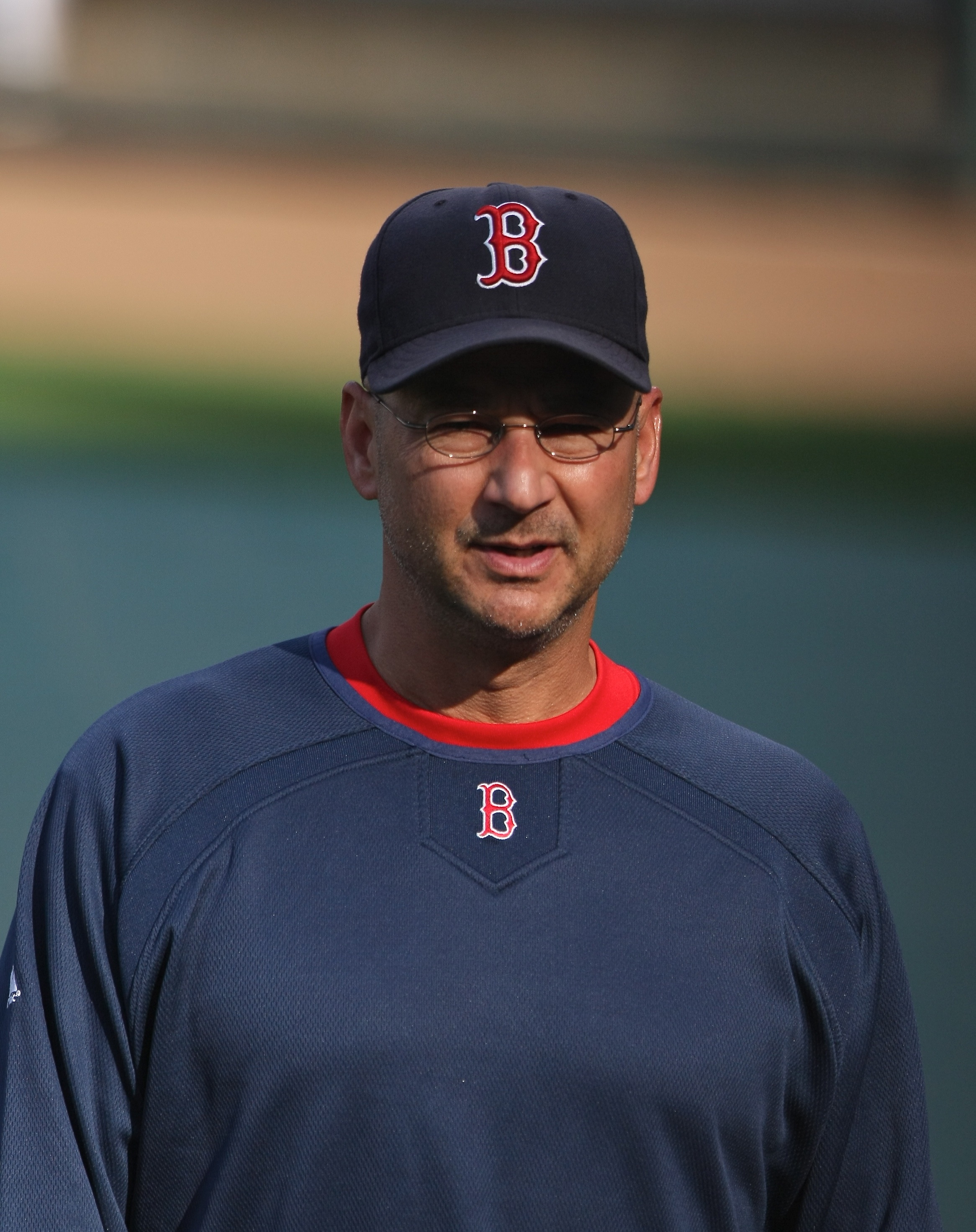
Terry Francona (pictured) and Bill Carrigan are the only managers to lead the team to two World Series titles.

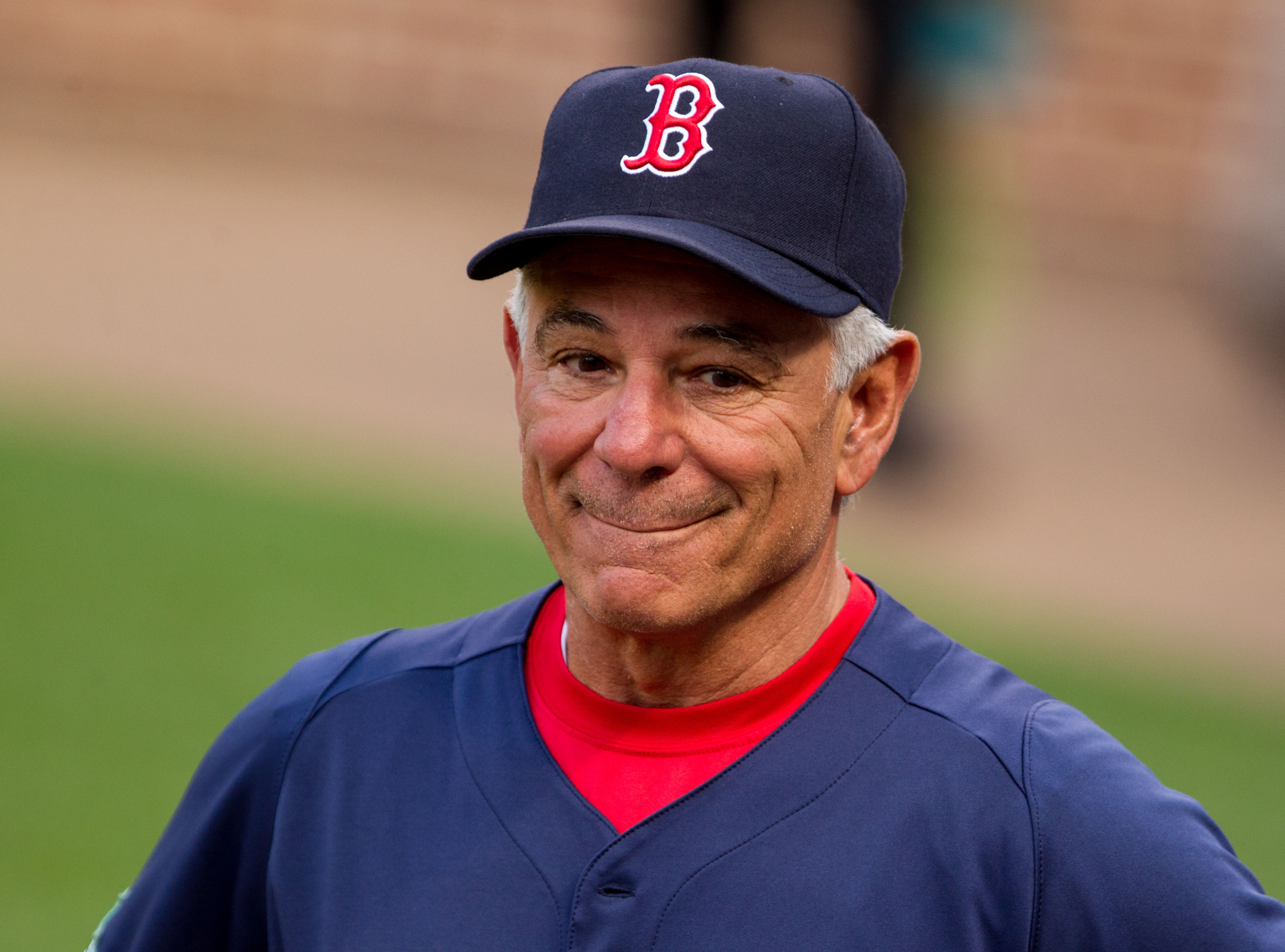
Bobby Valentine led the team to its worst season in 47 years.

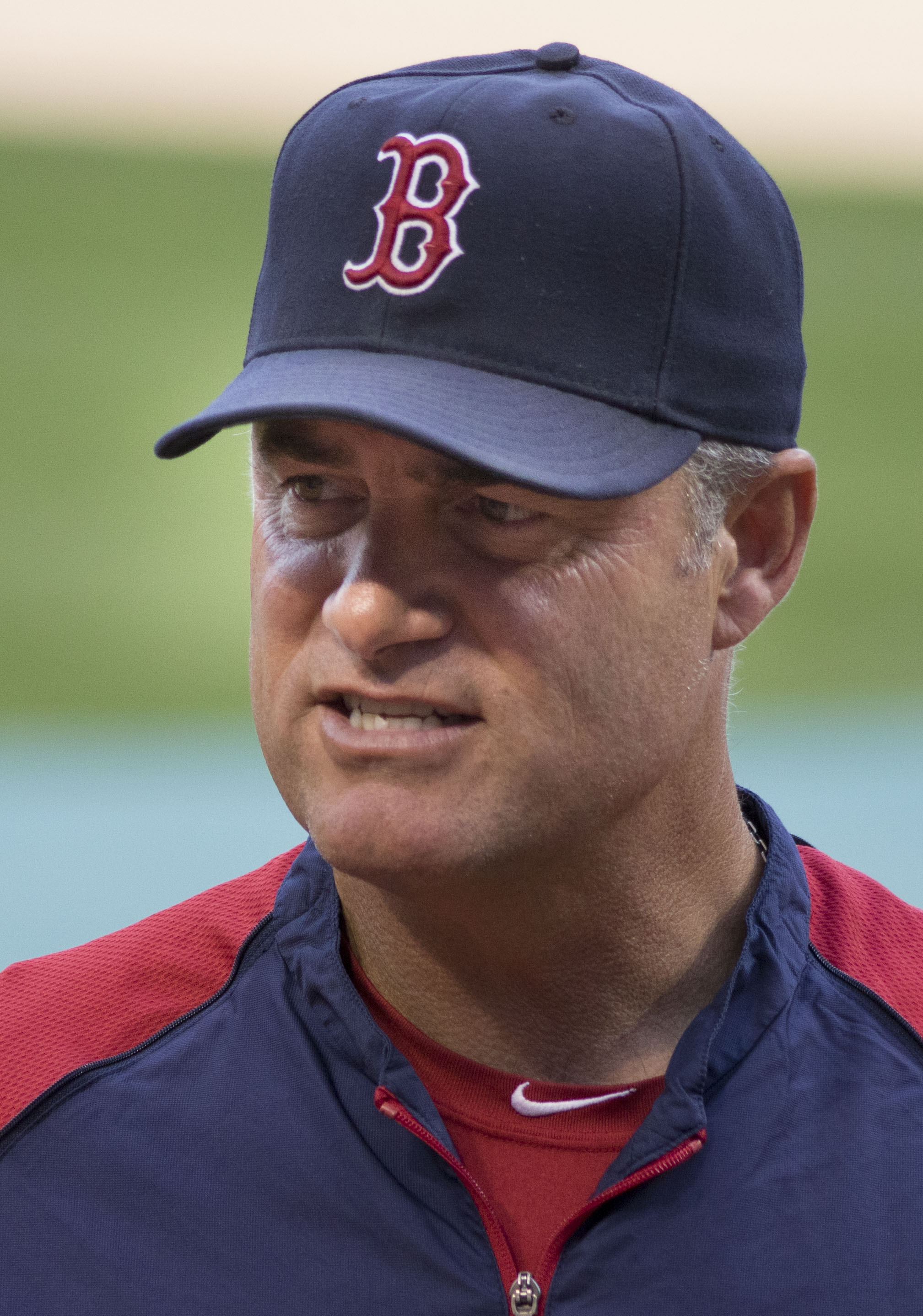
John Farrell led the team to one World Series championship and was the first Red Sox manager to lead the team to back-to-back division titles.

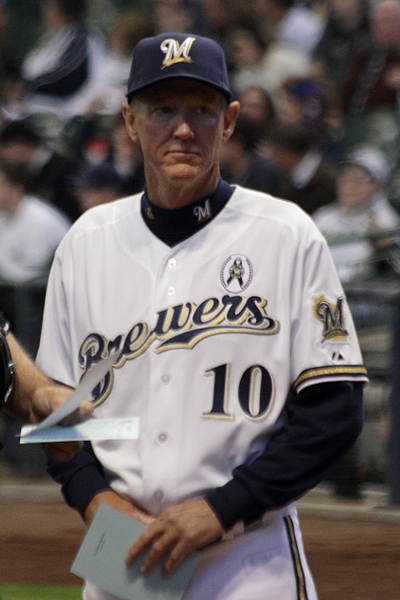
Ron Roenicke, shown with the Milwaukee Brewers, managed the Red Sox during the 60-game 2020 season.

== Sources ==
- "Red Sox All-time Managers". MLB.com. Archived from the original on 2011-09-27.
- "Red Sox Year-By-Year Results". MLB.com. Archived from the original on 2011-09-27.
- "Red Sox Postseason Results". MLB.com. Archived from the original on 2011-09-27.
- "Baseball Hall of Fame Alphabetical List". Baseball Almanac. Archived from the original on 2021-03-08.
