= Dutch Leonard =

Dutch Leonard was the name of two Major League Baseball pitchers:

- Dutch Leonard (left-handed pitcher) (1892–1952), left-handed pitcher with the Boston Red Sox and Detroit Tigers
- Dutch Leonard (right-handed pitcher) (1909–1983), right-handed pitcher with the Brooklyn Dodgers, Washington Senators, Philadelphia Phillies, and Chicago Cubs
