= Leading Creek (Tygart Valley River tributary) =

- Location of the mouth of Leading Creek in Elkins, West Virginia

Location
- Country: United States
- State: West Virginia
- County: Randolph County

Physical characteristics
- Source
  - location: north of Montrose
  - coordinates: 39.1164923°N 79.8197921°W
  - elevation: 2,431 ft (741 m)
- Mouth: Tygart Valley River
  - location: Elkins
  - coordinates: 38.9356612°N 79.8817369°W
  - elevation: 1,896 ft (578 m)
- Length: 17.4 mi (28.0 km)
- Basin size: 61 sq mi (160 km^{2})

Basin features
- Tributaries
  - right: Springstone Run

Leading Creek is a tributary of the Tygart Valley River, 17.4 miles (28.0 km) long, in eastern West Virginia in the United States. Via the Tygart Valley, Monongahela and Ohio rivers, it is part of the watershed of the Mississippi River, draining an area of 61 square miles (160 km^{2}) in the Allegheny Mountains. The stream's entire course and drainage basin are in northern Randolph County.

Leading Creek rises north of Montrose and flows southward in a valley between Laurel Mountain and Cheat Mountain, through Montrose and the unincorporated community of Kerens, to Elkins, where it flows into the Tygart Valley River from the north. The creek is paralleled by U.S. Route 219 for most of its course.

According to the West Virginia Department of Environmental Protection, approximately 80 percent of the Leading Creek watershed is forested, mostly deciduous. Approximately 18 percent is used for pasture and agriculture.

== See also ==
- List of rivers of West Virginia
