= Jimmy Walsh (outfielder) =

American baseball player (1885–1962)

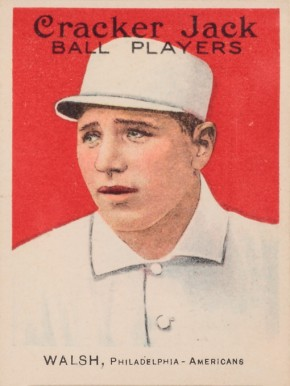
- Outfielder
- Born: August 27, 1887; Rathroe, County Tipperary, Ireland
- Died: July 3, 1962 (aged 74); Syracuse, New York, U.S.
- Batted: Left Threw: Right

MLB debut
- August 26, 1912, for the Philadelphia Athletics

Last MLB appearance
- October 4, 1917, for the Boston Red Sox

MLB statistics
- Batting average: .232
- Home runs: 6
- Runs batted in: 150
- Stats at Baseball Reference

Teams
- Philadelphia Athletics (1912–1913); New York Yankees (1914); Philadelphia Athletics (1914–1916); Boston Red Sox (1916–1917)

Career highlights and awards
- 2x World Series champion (1913, 1916)

James Charles Walsh (August 24, 1887 – July 3, 1962) was an American professional baseball outfielder. He played in Major League Baseball (MLB) from 1912 through 1917 for the Philadelphia Athletics (1912–13, 1914–16), New York Yankees (1914) and Boston Red Sox (1916–17). Walsh batted left-handed and threw right-handed. He was born in Rathroe, Ireland. He was the only player on the 1913 World Champion Athletics who was not born in the United States.

== Achievements ==
Walsh played in over 1,800 games spanning 13 seasons in the International League, hitting better than .300 ten times. He played for the Baltimore Orioles from 1910 to 1912, then spent the next six years in the American League, appearing in the 1914 World Series with the Athletics and in the 1916 World Series with the Red Sox.

In a six-season major league career, Walsh was a .232 hitter (410-for-1771) with six home runs and 150 RBIs in 541 games, including 235 runs, 71 doubles, 31 triples, 92 stolen bases, and a .330 on-base percentage. In 492 appearances at center field (169), right field (165) and left field (162), he posted a collective .964 fielding percentage (38 errors in 1049 total chances).

Following his major league career, Walsh returned to the International League, playing on two pennant winners in Baltimore. Twice he led the league with a .357 average in 1925 and a .388 average in 1926 at the age of 41, also driving in 131 runs.

After baseball, Walsh worked for the city of Syracuse as a foreman for their Department of Public Works. His nephew was the mayor of Syracuse, William F. Walsh. Jimmy Walsh died of a heart attack on July 3, 1962, while golfing at the Westvale Golf Club in Camillus, New York.

== See also ==
- List of players from Ireland in Major League Baseball
