= Heinie Wagner =

American baseball player and manager (1880–1943)

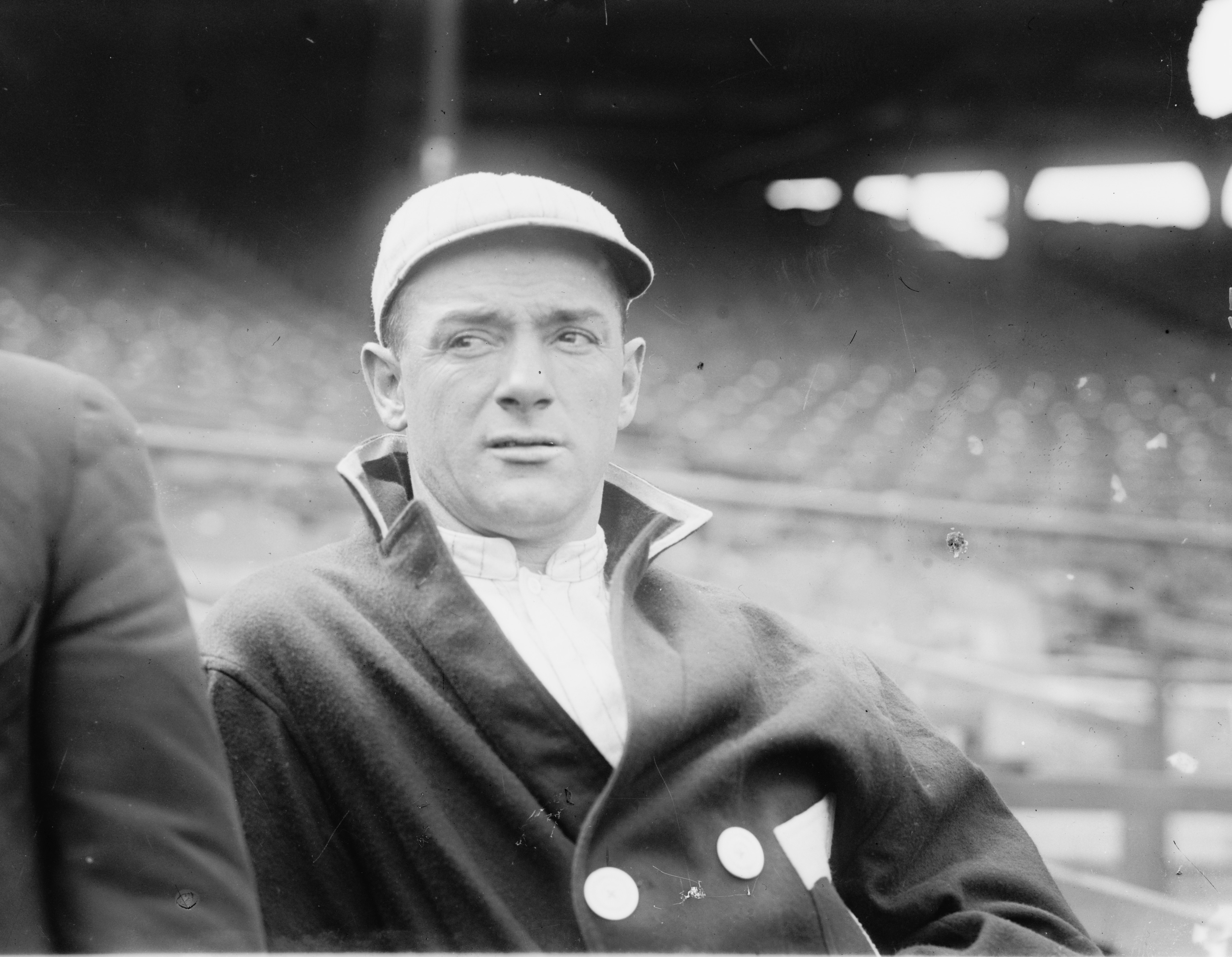
- Shortstop / Manager
- Born: September 23, 1880; New York, New York, U.S.
- Died: March 20, 1943 (aged 62); New Rochelle, New York, U.S.
- Batted: Right Threw: Right

MLB debut
- July 1, 1902, for the New York Giants

Last MLB appearance
- July 3, 1918, for the Boston Red Sox

MLB statistics
- Batting average: .250
- Home runs: 10
- Runs batted in: 343
- Managerial record: 52–102
- Winning %: .338
- Stats at Baseball Reference
- Managerial record at Baseball Reference

Teams
- As player: New York Giants (1902); Boston Americans/Red Sox (1906–1918); As manager: Boston Red Sox (1930)

Career highlights and awards
- 3× World Series champion (1912, 1915, 1916)

Charles Frederick "Heinie" Wagner (September 23, 1880 – March 20, 1943) was an American baseball player and manager. He played shortstop for the New York Giants (1902) and the Boston Red Sox (1906–1918). He was also the manager of the Red Sox during the 1930 baseball season.

Wagner was born in Harlem, New York, in September 1880. He began his baseball career playing for the Waverly Club in the New York State League in 1901. In 1902, he began the season playing for Columbus in the American Association, and played briefly in 17 games for the New York Giants of the National League. He spent the remainder of the 1902 season with the Newark Sailors and continued to play for the Eastern League team through 1906.

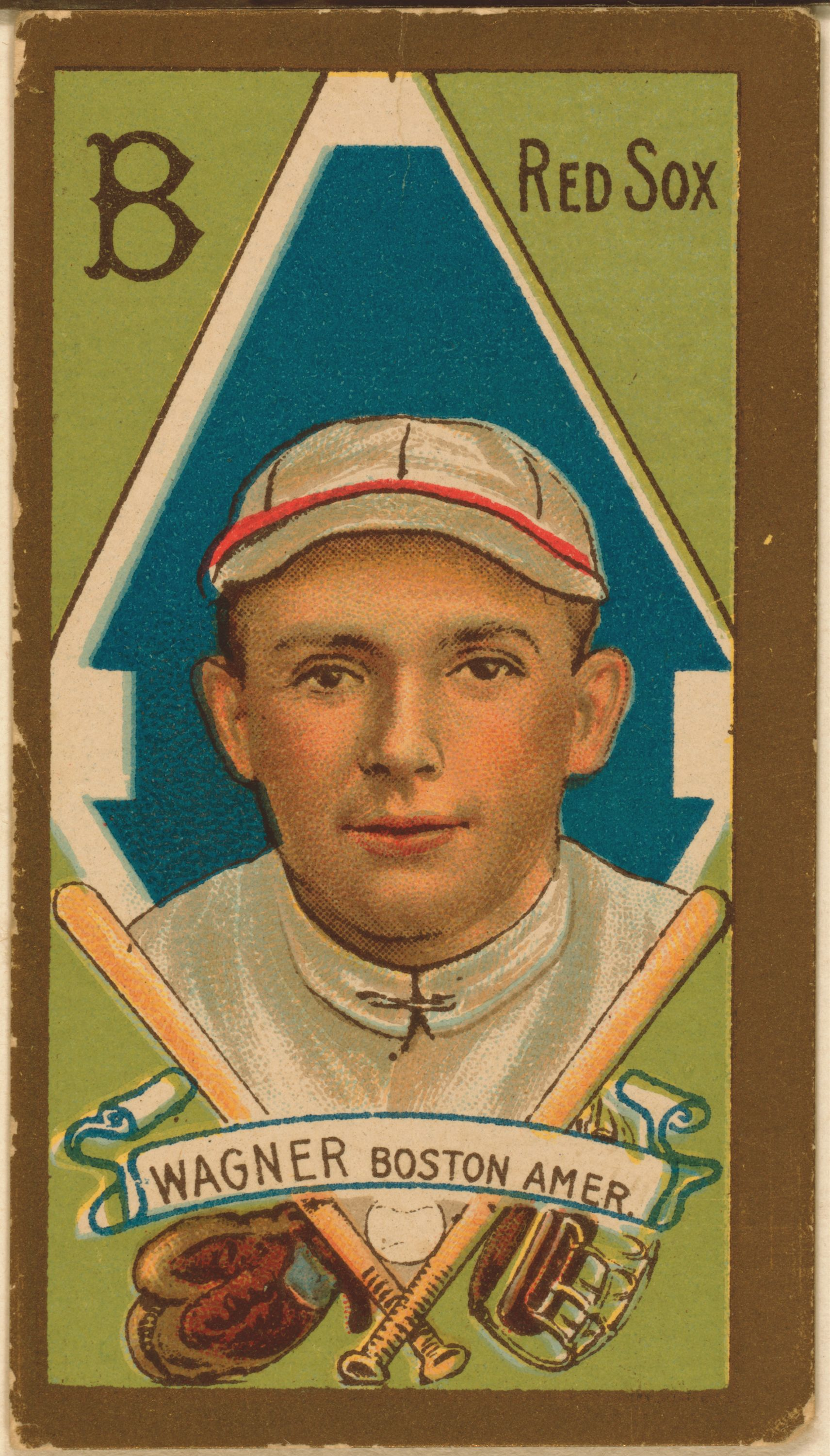
Heinie Wagner baseball card

In 1906, Wagner joined the Boston Red Sox. He played for the Red Sox from 1906 to 1918, missing only the 1914 and 1917 seasons. He was the captain of Boston's 1912 World Series championship team. He also played for the Red Sox World Series championship teams in 1915, 1916 and 1918. Wagner and Harry Hooper were the only players to play on all four of the Red Sox World Series championship teams of the era.

Wagner was considered to be a valuable infielder while playing with the Red Sox and was reputed to have "an exceptionally powerful and accurate throw." He was also known to block the basepaths with his "exceptionally big" feet. With 141 career stolen bases for the Red Sox, Wagner ranked third in team history when he retired (trailing Hall of Famers Harry Hooper and Tris Speaker) and still ranks fifth on the all-time Red Sox stolen base list.

After being released by the Red Sox in January 1916, Wagner served as the player-manager of the Hartford team in the Eastern League for the first part of the 1916 season. He returned to the Red Sox in late June 1916.

In 1920, Wagner closed out his playing career as the player-manager of the Norfolk Mary Janes in the Virginia League.

After seven years out of baseball, Wagner was hired as a coach for the Boston Red Sox under Bill Carrigan. He was reported to be Carrigan's "right-hand man" during the 1928, 1929, and 1930 seasons. In 1930, he was hired as manager of the Red Sox after Carrigan retired. In Wagner's sole season as manager, the Red Sox finished last in the American League with a 52–102 (.338) record. On September 29, 1930, Wagner's resignation as manager of the Red Sox was accepted by team president Bob Quinn. He never managed again.

After retiring from baseball, Wagner worked as the superintendent of a lumber yard in New Rochelle, New York. He also coached the baseball teams of the New Rochelle Police and Fire Departments and Elks Club.

Wagner was married to Martha Hahn Wagner. They had two sons and four daughters. In March 1943, Wagner died of a heart ailment at his home on Van Guilder Avenue in New Rochelle at age 62.

== Managerial record ==
Team	Year	Regular season					Postseason			
Team	Year	Games	Won	Lost	Win %	Finish	Won	Lost	Win %	Result
BOS	1930	154	52	102	.338	8th in AL	–	–	–	–
Total		154	52	102	.338		0	0	–	
