= Rube Foster (baseball, born 1888) =

American baseball player (1888–1976)

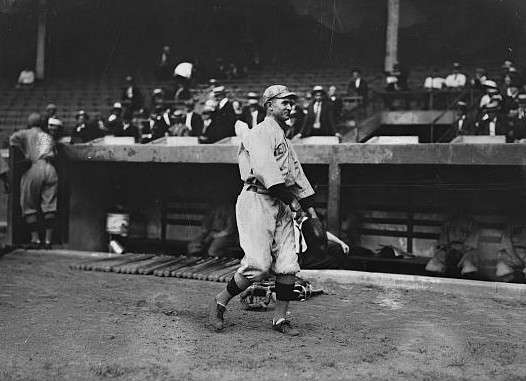
- Pitcher
- Born: January 5, 1888; Lehigh, Oklahoma
- Died: March 1, 1976 (aged 88); Bokoshe, Oklahoma, U.S.
- Batted: Right Threw: Right

MLB debut
- April 10, 1913, for the Boston Red Sox

Last MLB appearance
- September 29, 1917, for the Boston Red Sox

MLB statistics
- Win–loss record: 58–33
- Earned run average: 2.36
- Strikeouts: 294
- Stats at Baseball Reference

Teams
- Boston Red Sox (1913–1917)

Career highlights and awards
- 2× World Series champion (1915, 1916); Pitched a no-hitter on June 21, 1916

George "Rube" Foster (January 5, 1888 – March 1, 1976) was an American professional baseball player. Foster was a right-handed pitcher who played five major-league seasons with the Boston Red Sox of the American League. He was a member of two World Series championship teams, in 1915 and 1916.

== Career ==
Foster was picked up by the Boston Red Sox and made his major league debut for the team on April 10, 1913. Foster acted as a starting pitcher and a relief pitcher for the team during the 19 games he pitched in during the season. He posted a 3–3 record with a 3.16 earned run average (ERA) and 36 strikeouts in 68 1/3 innings pitched.

Foster's sophomore season in the big leagues was one of his best, in which he pitched in 32 games, while starting in 27 of them. He finished with a 14–8 record, and finished second in the American League with a 1.70 ERA. Foster was only behind his Red Sox teammate, Dutch Leonard, who posted a 0.96 ERA, which is now considered the modern day all-time single-season record.

In 1915, Foster posted a 20–8 record, and another impressive 2.11 ERA. Foster most effectively showed his importance to the team in the 1915 World Series where he picked up two complete game wins and only gave up four earned runs and struck out 13 batters in 18 innings pitched. With the bat, Foster went 4-for-8, with a double and an RBI.

Foster had another good campaign in 1916, acting as a starting pitcher and relief pitcher. He went 14–7 in the season, and posted a 3.06 ERA. On June 21 of that year, he no-hit the New York Yankees 2-0 at Fenway Park. In the 1916 World Series, Foster came in relief in Game 3, and pitched three scoreless innings. The Red Sox ended up winning the series 4 games to 1, and became the first back-to-back winners of the World Series since the Philadelphia Athletics had done it five years earlier.

Foster went back to a mainly starting role in 1917, posting an 8–7 record with a 2.53 ERA. He pitched in relief of starting pitcher Babe Ruth and earned the win in the Tim Murnane Benefit Game, an exhibition fund-raising game held in late September that saw the Red Sox defeat an all-star team of notable players of the era including Ty Cobb, Tris Speaker, and Shoeless Joe Jackson.

Before the start of the 1918 season, Foster was traded to the Cincinnati Reds for Dave Shean. Foster refused to report to his new team and so the Red Sox sent cash to the Reds to complete the trade. Foster later played parts of three minor-league seasons in the Pacific Coast League, 1923–1925.

Foster's major-league stats for his career indicate a 58–33 career pitching record, a 2.36 ERA and 294 strikeouts in 842 1/3 innings pitched. As a hitter, Foster posted a .215 batting average (58-for-270) with 1 home run, 19 RBI and 16 bases on balls. In three World Series appearances, he hit .444 (4-for-9) with 1 RBI. Defensively, he was better than average, recording a .970 fielding percentage which was 30 percentage points higher than the league average at his position.

== See also ==
- List of Major League Baseball no-hitters

Preceded by Tom Hughes	No-hitter pitcher June 21, 1916	Succeeded by Bullet Joe Bush
