= Pinch Thomas =

American baseball player (1888–1953)

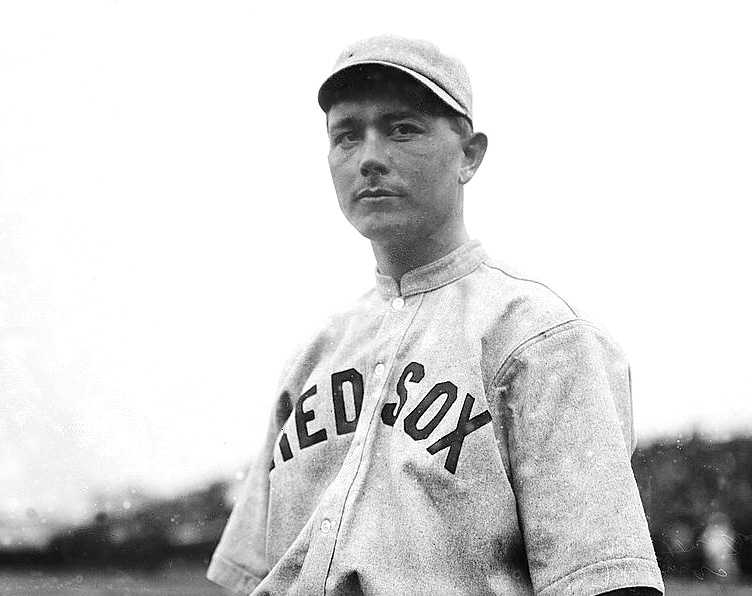
- Thomas in 1913
- Born: January 24, 1888; Camp Point, Illinois, U.S.
- Died: December 24, 1953 (aged 65); Modesto, California, U.S.
- Batted: Left Threw: Right

MLB debut
- April 24, 1912, for the Boston Red Sox

Last MLB appearance
- June 19, 1921, for the Cleveland Indians

Career statistics
- Batting average: .237
- Home runs: 2
- Runs batted in: 102
- Stats at Baseball Reference

Teams
- Boston Red Sox (1912–1917); Cleveland Indians (1918–1921)

Career highlights and awards
- 4× World Series champion: 1912, 1915, 1916, 1920

Chester David "Pinch" Thomas (January 24, 1888 – December 24, 1953) was an American professional baseball catcher who played in Major League Baseball from 1912 through 1921 for the Boston Red Sox (1912–17) and Cleveland Indians (1918–21). Listed at 5 ft 9.5 in (1.77 m), 173 lb., Thomas batted left-handed and threw right-handed. He was born in Camp Point, Illinois.

== Biography ==
The Red Sox signed Thomas in 1911 but allowed him to play the 1911 season with the Sacramento Sacts before recalling him to the Major Leagues for the 1912 season. He spent the 1912 season as a little-used backup catcher for 1912 World Series championship Red Sox.

A fine defensive replacement, Thomas was the primary catcher for the Red Sox during three years, helping them to the World Championship in 1915 and 1916. On June 23, 1917, Thomas was involved in a combined no-hitter in which he and Babe Ruth were both ejected after disagreement over the strike zone after Ruth walked the first batter. Ernie Shore and Sam Agnew replaced Ruth and Thomas respectively and promptly caught the walked batter at second and recorded 26 consecutive outs.

In 1917 he led American League catchers with a .986 fielding percentage, but at the end of the season he was dealt to the Philadelphia Athletics, with two other players, in the same transaction that brought Joe Bush, Wally Schang and Amos Strunk to Boston. He did not appear in a game for the Athletics and was sold to the Indians. While in Cleveland, he won a fourth World Series ring in 1920. A good pinch-hitter as well, he hit .417 (13-for-31) from 1913 to 1918.

In a 10-season career, Thomas was a .237 hitter (245-for-1035) with two home runs and 102 RBI, including 88 runs, 27 doubles, eight triples, 12 stolen bases, and a .318 on-base percentage. In 423 catching appearances, he committed 52 errors in 1,948 chances for a .973 fielding percentage. He appeared as himself in the Paramount feature film Warming Up.

Thomas died in Modesto, California at age 65.
