= Mike McNally =

American baseball player (1893–1965)

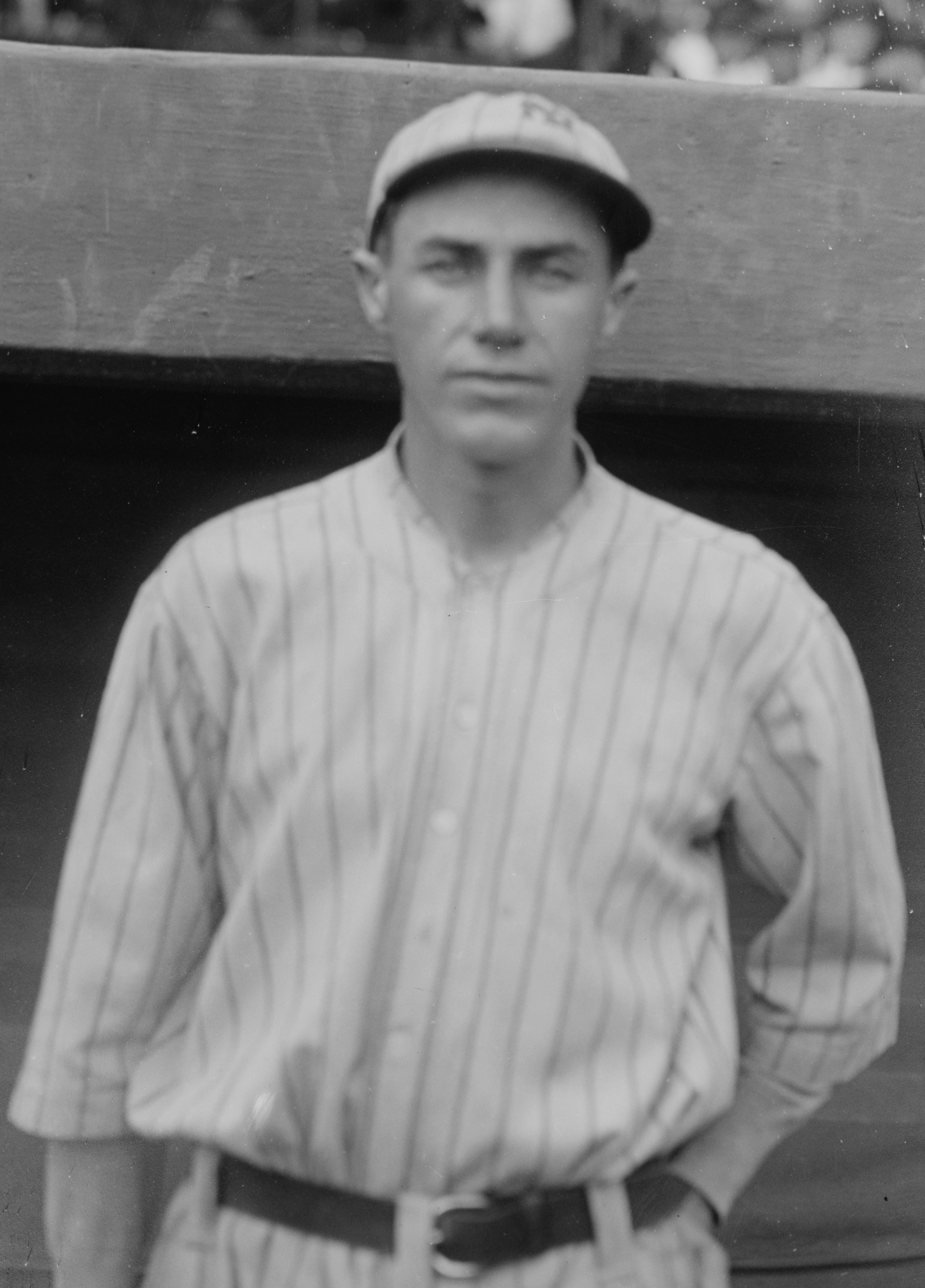
- Infielder
- Born: September 13, 1893; Minooka, Pennsylvania, U.S.
- Died: May 29, 1965 (aged 71); Bethlehem, Pennsylvania, U.S.
- Batted: Right Threw: Right

MLB debut
- April 21, 1915, for the Boston Red Sox

Last MLB appearance
- June 12, 1925, for the Washington Senators

MLB statistics
- Batting average: .238
- Hits: 257
- Runs: 169
- Stats at Baseball Reference

Teams
- Boston Red Sox (1915–1920); New York Yankees (1921–1924); Washington Senators (1925)

Career highlights and awards
- 2x World Series championship (1916, 1923)

Michael Joseph McNally (September 13, 1893 – May 29, 1965), nicknamed "Minooka Mike", was an American professional baseball player, scout, manager and general manager. He played in Major League Baseball as an infielder and utility player from 1915 to 1925, most prominently for the Boston Red Sox and the New York Yankees where he contributed to five American League pennant winning teams and two World Series championships. He played his final season with the Washington Senators.

McNally developed a close bond with his teammate Babe Ruth, first with the Red Sox and later with the Yankees. As Ruth's roommate with the Yankees, he became known as the boisterous slugger's babysitter and guardian during their off-field antics. After retiring as a player, McNally continued to work in baseball as a minor league manager and General Manager in the Cleveland Indians organization. He later was named the director of the Indians’ farm system where he became known for signing Rocky Colavito.

== Baseball career ==
McNally was born in Minooka, Pennsylvania to Catherine Summeral and Patrick McNally and was a next-door neighbor to the four Major League O’Neill brothers. Both parents were born in County Mayo, Ireland. In 1921, he married Mary "Mae" Murray of South Scranton.

A clever reserve infielder and basically a line drive hitter, Mc Nally entered the majors in 1915 with the Boston Red Sox, playing for them five years before joining the New York Yankees (1921–24) and Washington Senators (1925). His most productive season came with the 1920 Red Sox, when he posted career-highs in games (93), runs (42), hits (80), stolen bases (13) and on-base percentage (.326), while hitting a .256 average.

In a 10-season career, McNally was a .238 hitter (257-for-1078) with 169 runs and 85 RBI in 492 games, including 16 doubles, six triples, one home run and 40 stolen bases. As an infielder, he made 415 appearances at second base (181), third base (167), shortstop (60) and first base (7), while posting a collective .951 fielding percentage.

McNally also played on five American League pennant winners, appearing in the World Series with Boston in 1916 and for New York in 1921 and 1922, though he did not play in the 1915 and 1923 Series. In nine appearances, he hit .200 (4-for-20) with one RBI, two stolen base, four runs, and stole home plate in Game One of 1921 Series.

Following his playing retirement, McNally managed in the minor leagues from 1927 to 1938 for the Binghamton Triplets (1927–29), Wilkes-Barre Barons (1930–32, 1937–38) and Williamsport Grays (1933–36). He posted an 872–781 record for a .528 winning percentage, including four first places and the 1934 New York–Penn League championship title with the Williamsport Grays. After that, he worked during almost two decades for the Cleveland Indians as a scout and farm club director.

McNalley died at St. Luke's Hospital in Bethlehem, Pennsylvania on May 29, 1965 after suffering from issues with his lungs and heart. McNally was visiting a niece in the area and entered the hospital on April 9.

== Transactions ==
- Dec. 15, 1920: Traded by the Boston Red Sox along with Harry Harper, Waite Hoyt, and Wally Schang to the New York Yankees in exchange for Muddy Ruel, Del Pratt, Sammy Vick, and Hank Thormahlen.
- Dec. 10, 1924: Traded by the New York Yankees to the Boston Red Sox for Howie Shanks.
- Dec. 11, 1924: Traded by the Boston Red Sox to the Washington Senators for Doc Prothro.
