= Montrose, West Virginia =

- Town
- Location of Montrose in Randolph County, West Virginia.
- Coordinates: 39°3′54″N 79°48′53″W
- Country: United States
- State: West Virginia
- County: Randolph

Area
  - Total: 0.63 sq mi (1.62 km^{2})
  - Land: 0.63 sq mi (1.62 km^{2})
  - Water: 0 sq mi (0.00 km^{2})
- Elevation: 1,985 ft (605 m)

Population (2020)
  - Total: 145
  - Estimate (2021): 141
  - Density: 244.0/sq mi (94.21/km^{2})
- Time zone: UTC-5 (Eastern (EST))
  - Summer (DST): UTC-4 (EDT)
- ZIP code: 26283
- Area code: 304
- FIPS code: 54-55540
- GNIS feature ID: 1555157

Montrose is a town in Randolph County, West Virginia, United States. The population was 141 at the 2020 census.

The town was so named on account of wild rose bushes near the original town site.

== Geography ==
Montrose is located at 39°3′54″N 79°48′53″W (39.064958, -79.814810), along Leading Creek.

According to the United States Census Bureau, the town has a total area of 0.63 square miles (1.63 km^{2}), all land.

== Demographics ==
Historical population
Census	Pop.	Note	%±
1910	112		—
1920	129		15.2%
1930	114		−11.6%
1940	122		7.0%
1950	79		−35.2%
1960	114		44.3%
1970	115		0.9%
1980	129		12.2%
1990	140		8.5%
2000	156		11.4%
2010	156		0.0%
2020	145		−7.1%
2021 (est.)	141	▼	−2.8%
U.S. Decennial Census

=== 2010 census ===
At the 2010 census there were 156 people, 74 households, and 47 families living in the town. The population density was 247.6 inhabitants per square mile (95.6/km^{2}). There were 79 housing units at an average density of 125.4 per square mile (48.4/km^{2}). The racial makeup of the town was 100.0% White. Of the 74 households 20.3% had children under the age of 18 living with them, 52.7% were married couples living together, 6.8% had a female householder with no husband present, 4.1% had a male householder with no wife present, and 36.5% were non-families. 32.4% of households were one person and 14.9% were one person aged 65 or older. The average household size was 2.11 and the average family size was 2.68.

The median age in the town was 49.3 years. 17.3% of residents were under the age of 18; 4.4% were between the ages of 18 and 24; 18.6% were from 25 to 44; 43.6% were from 45 to 64; and 16% were 65 or older. The gender makeup of the town was 51.3% male and 48.7% female.

=== 2000 census ===
At the 2000 census there were 156 people, 60 households, and 45 families living in the town. The population density was 243.1 inhabitants per square mile (94.1/km^{2}). There were 67 housing units at an average density of 104.4 per square mile (40.4/km^{2}). The racial makeup of the town was 99.36% White and 0.64% Asian. Of the 60 households 38.3% had children under the age of 18 living with them, 71.7% were married couples living together, and 25.0% were non-families. 21.7% of households were one person and 8.3% were one person aged 65 or older. The average household size was 2.60 and the average family size was 3.07.

The age distribution was 27.6% under the age of 18, 5.8% from 18 to 24, 34.6% from 25 to 44, 19.9% from 45 to 64, and 12.2% 65 or older. The median age was 36 years. For every 100 females, there were 97.5 males. For every 100 females age 18 and over, there were 113.2 males.

The median household income was $33,571 and the median family income was $34,464. Males had a median income of $33,125 versus $16,250 for females. The per capita income for the town was $16,121. About 2.3% of families and 4.0% of the population were below the poverty line, including none of those under the age of eighteen and 7.7% of those sixty five or over.
