= Hal Janvrin =

American baseball player (1892–1962)

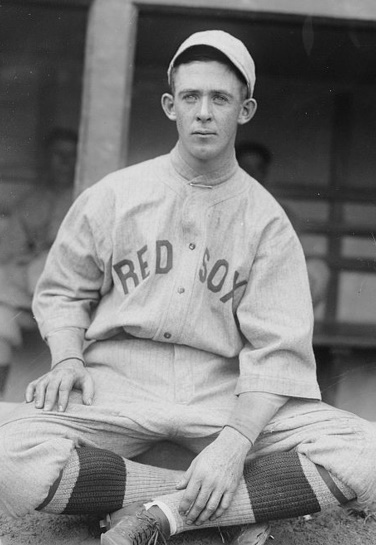
- Janvrin with the Boston Red Sox in 1916
- Utility Infielder
- Born: August 27, 1892; Haverhill, Massachusetts, U.S.
- Died: March 1, 1962 (aged 69); Boston, Massachusetts, U.S.
- Batted: Right Threw: Right

MLB debut
- July 9, 1911, for the Boston Red Sox

Last MLB appearance
- October 1, 1922, for the Brooklyn Robins

MLB statistics
- Batting average: .232
- Home runs: 6
- Runs batted in: 210
- Stats at Baseball Reference

Teams
- Boston Red Sox (1911, 1913–1917); Washington Senators (1919); St. Louis Cardinals (1919–1921); Brooklyn Robins (1921–1922)

Harold Chandler Janvrin (August 27, 1892 – March 1, 1962), born in Haverhill, Massachusetts, was an American utility infielder for the Boston Red Sox (1911 and 1913–17), Washington Senators (1919), St. Louis Cardinals (1919–21) and Brooklyn Robins (1921–22).

He helped the Red Sox win the 1915 and 1916 World Series.

In 10 seasons he played in 759 Games and had 2,221 At Bats, 250 Runs, 515 Hits, 68 Doubles, 18 Triples, 6 Home Runs, 210 RBI, 79 Stolen Bases, 171 Walks, .232 Batting Average, .292 On-base percentage, .287 Slugging Percentage, 637 Total Bases and 104 Sacrifice Hits.

During the First World War, Janvrin served in the United States Army 301st signal corps out of Fort Devens in Ayer, Massachusetts. Janvrin earned the rank of Second Lieutenant.

He died in Boston, Massachusetts, at the age of 69. Janvrin is buried at The Exeter Cemetery in Exeter, New Hampshire.
