= Springstone Run =

Stream in West Virginia, U.S.

Coordinates: 39°01′32″N 79°49′09″W

Springstone Run is a stream in the U.S. state of West Virginia.

Springstone Run most likely was named after Abraham Springstone, an early settler.

== See also ==
- List of rivers of West Virginia
