= 1916 World Series =

1916 Major League Baseball championship series

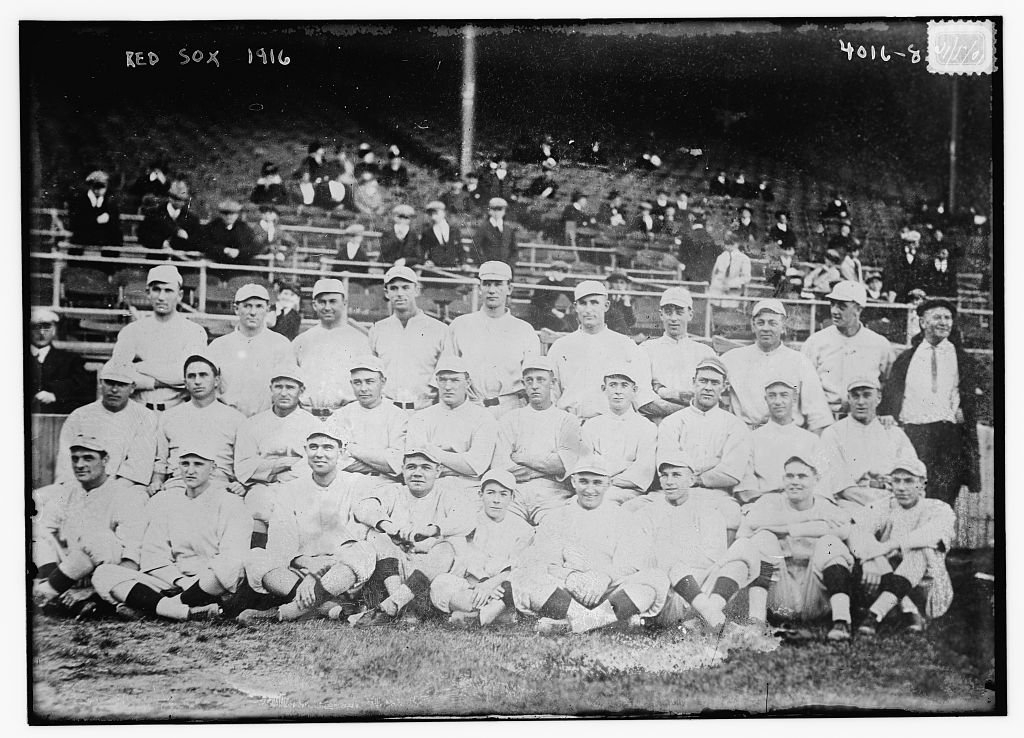
- The Red Sox' World Series winning roster
Team (Wins)	Managers	Season
Boston Red Sox (4)	Bill Carrigan	91–63, .591, GA: 2
Brooklyn Robins (1)	Wilbert Robinson	94–60, .610, GA: 2 1/2
- Dates: October 7–12
- Venue(s): Braves Field (Boston); Ebbets Field (Brooklyn)
- Umpires: Tommy Connolly (AL), Hank O'Day (NL); Bill Dinneen (AL), Ernie Quigley (NL)
- Hall of Famers: Umpire: Tommy Connolly; Hank O'Day; Red Sox: Harry Hooper; Herb Pennock (DNP); Babe Ruth; Robins: Wilbert Robinson (mgr.); Rube Marquard; Casey Stengel‡ Zack Wheat ‡ elected as a manager

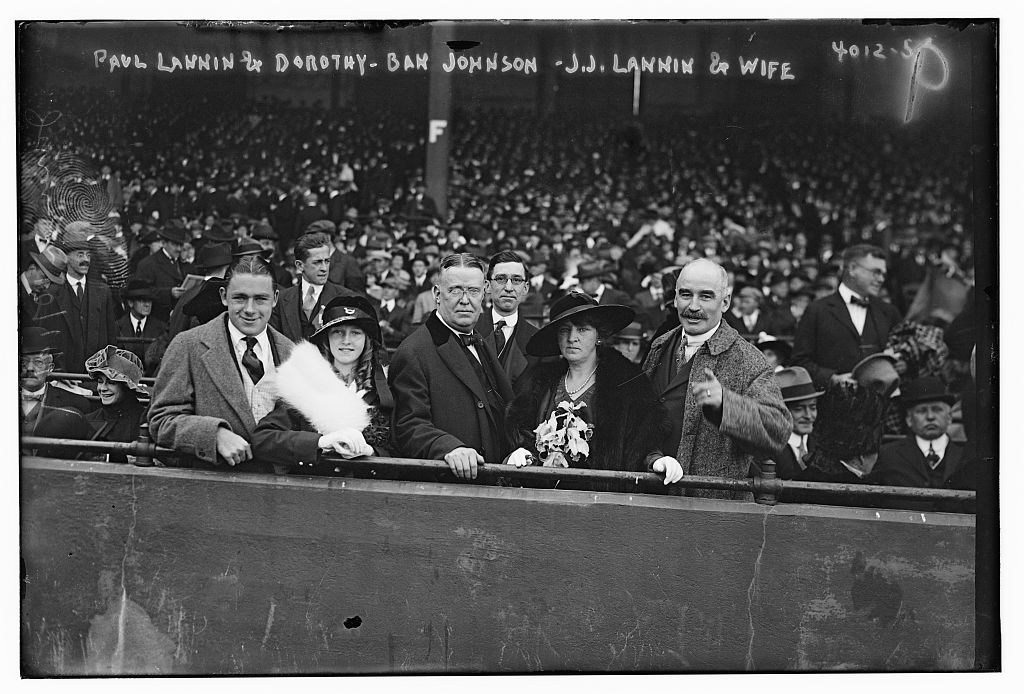
Paul Joseph Lannin and Dorothy A. Lannin, Ban Johnson, Joseph John Lannin and Hannah Furlong, his wife, at the 1916 World Series

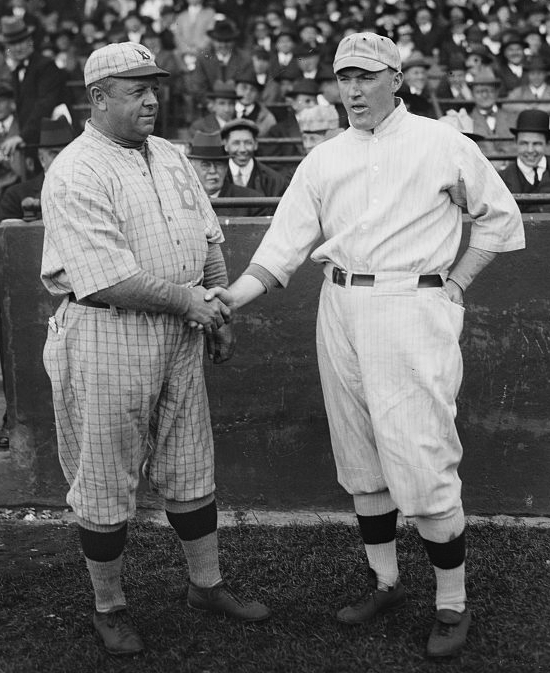
Robins manager Wilbert Robinson with Red Sox manager Bill Carrigan

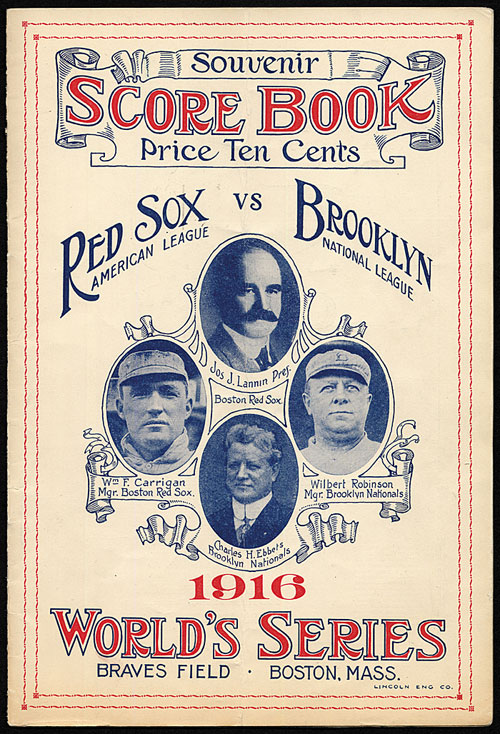
A scorebook from the 1916 World Series, depicting Red Sox owner Joseph Lannin, Red Sox manager Bill Carrigan, Dodgers owner Charles Ebbets, and Manager Wilbert Robinson

The 1916 World Series was the championship series in Major League Baseball for the 1916 season. The 13th edition of the World Series, it matched the American League (AL) champion Boston Red Sox against the National League (NL) champion Brooklyn Robins. The Red Sox won the Series four games to one, capturing their record-setting fourth World Series title. It was the first World Series meeting between the teams.

Casey Stengel shone on offense for the Robins in the 1916 Series, but the Red Sox pitching corps ultimately proved too much for the denizens of Flatbush. The Sox's Babe Ruth pitched 13 shutout innings in Game 2, starting a consecutive scoreless innings streak that would reach 29 in 1918. As with the 1915 Series, the Red Sox played their home games at the larger Braves Field, and it paid off as they drew a then-record 43,620 people for the final game.

Brooklyn fielded some strong teams under their manager and namesake Wilbert Robinson in the late 1910s. The Robins, also interchangeably called the Dodgers, would win the pennant again in 1920, but the American League teams were generally stronger during that interval. It would be 39 years before the Dodgers would win their first World Series title in 1955.

The two franchises met again in the postseason for the first time in 102 years in the 2018 World Series, 60 years after the Dodgers relocated to Los Angeles. The record for most innings played in a World Series game, set by Game 2 in 1916, at 14, was broken by Game 3 in 2018, at 18. Just like their first matchup in the World Series, the Red Sox would eventually go on to defeat the Dodgers in five games to win their ninth World Series championship overall and fourth World Series championship since 2004.

This was the second meeting between teams from Boston and New York City for a major professional sports championship, and the last Boston-New York matchup in the Fall Classic until 1986.

== Summary ==
AL Boston Red Sox (4) vs. NL Brooklyn Robins (1)

Game	Date	Score	Location	Time	Attendance
1	October 7	Brooklyn Robins – 5, Boston Red Sox – 6	Braves Field	2:16	36,117
2	October 9	Brooklyn Robins – 1, Boston Red Sox – 2 (14)	Braves Field	2:32	41,373
3	October 10	Boston Red Sox – 3, Brooklyn Robins – 4	Ebbets Field	2:01	21,087
4	October 11	Boston Red Sox – 6, Brooklyn Robins – 2	Ebbets Field	2:30	21,662
5	October 12	Brooklyn Robins – 1, Boston Red Sox – 4	Braves Field	1:43	42,620

== Matchups ==
=== Game 1 ===
Saturday, October 7, 1916 2:00 pm (ET) at Braves Field in Boston, Massachusetts
Team	1	2	3	4	5	6	7	8	9	R	H	E
Brooklyn	0	0	0	1	0	0	0	0	4	5	10	4
Boston	0	0	1	0	1	0	3	1	X	6	8	1
WP: Ernie Shore (1–0) LP: Rube Marquard (0–1) Sv: Carl Mays (1)

Until the ninth, Boston starter Ernie Shore was in control. Holding a comfortable 6–1 lead, a walk, hit batter, error and bases-loaded walk to Fred Merkle finally forced the Red Sox to call on Carl Mays from the bullpen to preserve a 6–5 win.

=== Game 2 ===
Monday, October 9, 1916 2:00 pm (ET) at Braves Field in Boston, Massachusetts
Team	1	2	3	4	5	6	7	8	9	10	11	12	13	14	R	H	E
Brooklyn	1	0	0	0	0	0	0	0	0	0	0	0	0	0	1	6	2
Boston	0	0	1	0	0	0	0	0	0	0	0	0	0	1	2	7	1
WP: Babe Ruth (1–0) LP: Sherry Smith (0–1); Home runs: BKN: Hy Myers (1); BOS: None

The Robins scored in the top of the first on an inside-the-park home run by Hy Myers, and the Red Sox tied it in the bottom of the third, Ruth himself knocking in the run with a ground ball. The game remained 1–1 until the bottom of the 14th, when the Red Sox won it on a pinch-hit single by Del Gainer. The 14-inning game set a World Series record for longest game by innings. That mark was equaled in Game 3 of the 2005 World Series between the Chicago White Sox and Houston Astros, and then again in Game 1 of the 2015 World Series between the Kansas City Royals and New York Mets, before being broken in an 18-inning Game 3 of the 2018 World Series between the Dodgers and Red Sox.

=== Game 3 ===
Tuesday, October 10, 1916 2:00 pm (ET) at Ebbets Field in Brooklyn, New York
Team	1	2	3	4	5	6	7	8	9	R	H	E
Boston	0	0	0	0	0	2	1	0	0	3	7	1
Brooklyn	0	0	1	1	2	0	0	0	X	4	10	0
WP: Jack Coombs (1–0) LP: Carl Mays (0–1) Sv: Jeff Pfeffer (1); Home runs: BOS: Larry Gardner (1); BKN: None

A seventh-inning home run by Larry Gardner chased Brooklyn starter Jack Coombs and brought Boston to within one run. Jeff Pfeffer came through with 2 2/3 innings of hitless relief to save the victory for Coombs.

=== Game 4 ===
Wednesday, October 11, 1916 2:00 pm (ET) at Ebbets Field in Brooklyn, New York
Team	1	2	3	4	5	6	7	8	9	R	H	E
Boston	0	3	0	1	1	0	1	0	0	6	10	1
Brooklyn	2	0	0	0	0	0	0	0	0	2	5	4
WP: Dutch Leonard (1–0) LP: Rube Marquard (0–2); Home runs: BOS: Larry Gardner (2); BKN: None

Brooklyn's first three batters reached safely off Dutch Leonard in a two-run first inning, but that's all the Dodgers would get. Larry Gardner's second home run in two days was an inside-the-park one to left-center that scored two teammates ahead of him, giving Leonard all he would need for the win.

=== Game 5 ===
Thursday, October 12, 1916 2:00 pm (ET) at Braves Field in Boston, Massachusetts
Team	1	2	3	4	5	6	7	8	9	R	H	E
Brooklyn	0	1	0	0	0	0	0	0	0	1	3	3
Boston	0	1	2	0	1	0	0	0	X	4	7	2
WP: Ernie Shore (2–0) LP: Jeff Pfeffer (0–1)

The final game was over in a snappy 1 hour, 43 minutes. Ernie Shore threw a three-hitter. Boston scratched out a run on a walk, sacrifice bunt, ground-out and passed ball. The Red Sox added more in the third, thanks to an error and a Chick Shorten RBI single, and the fifth when Harry Hooper singled and scored on a Hal Janvrin double. Casey Stengel led off the Dodger ninth with a hit, but Shore allowed no more. For the second straight series, Red Sox pitching dominated, this time holding the Robins to a team .200 batting average, contributing to an easy 5-game victory.

== Composite line score ==
1916 World Series (4–1): Boston Red Sox (A.L.) over Brooklyn Robins (N.L.)

Team	1	2	3	4	5	6	7	8	9	10	11	12	13	14	R	H	E
Boston Red Sox	0	4	4	1	3	2	5	1	0	0	0	0	0	1	21	39	6
Brooklyn Robins	3	1	1	2	2	0	0	0	4	0	0	0	0	0	13	34	13
Total attendance: 169,859 Average attendance: 33,972; Winning player's share: $3,910 Losing player's share: $2,835

== Series statistics ==
=== Boston Red Sox ===
==== Batting ====
Note: GP=Games played; AB=At bats; R=Runs; H=Hits; 2B=Doubles; 3B=Triples; HR=Home runs; RBI=Runs batted in; BB=Walks; AVG=Batting average; OBP=On base percentage; SLG=Slugging percentage

Player	GP	AB	R	H	2B	3B	HR	RBI	BB	AVG	OBP	SLG	Reference
Pinch Thomas	3	7	0	1	0	1	0	0	0	.143	.143	.429	
Dick Hoblitzell	5	17	3	4	1	1	0	2	6	.235	.435	.412	
Hal Janvrin	5	23	2	5	3	0	0	1	0	.217	.217	.348	
Larry Gardner	5	17	2	3	0	0	2	6	0	.176	.176	.529	
Everett Scott	5	16	1	2	0	1	0	1	1	.125	.176	.250	
Duffy Lewis	5	17	3	6	2	1	0	1	2	.353	.421	.588	
Tilly Walker	3	11	1	3	0	1	0	1	1	.273	.333	.455	
Harry Hooper	5	21	6	7	1	1	0	1	3	.333	.417	.476	
Chick Shorten	2	7	0	4	0	0	0	2	0	.571	.571	.571	
Hick Cady	2	4	1	1	0	0	0	0	3	.250	.571	.250	
Bill Carrigan	1	3	0	2	0	0	0	1	0	.667	.667	.667	
Jimmy Walsh	1	3	0	0	0	0	0	0	0	.000	.000	.000	
Del Gainer	1	1	0	1	0	0	0	1	0	1.000	1.000	1.000	
Olaf Henriksen	1	0	1	0	0	0	0	0	1	─	1.000	─	
Mike McNally	1	0	1	0	0	0	0	0	0	─	─	─	
Ernie Shore	2	7	0	0	0	0	0	0	0	.000	.000	.000	
Babe Ruth	1	5	0	0	0	0	0	1	0	.000	.000	.000	
Dutch Leonard	1	3	0	0	0	0	0	0	1	.000	.250	.000	
Carl Mays	2	1	0	0	0	0	0	0	0	.000	.000	.000	
Rube Foster	1	1	0	0	0	0	0	0	0	.000	.000	.000	

==== Pitching ====
Note: G=Games Played; GS=Games Started; IP=Innings Pitched; H=Hits; BB=Walks; R=Runs; ER=Earned Runs; SO=Strikeouts; W=Wins; L=Losses; SV=Saves; ERA=Earned Run Average

Player	G	GS	IP	H	BB	R	ER	SO	W	L	SV	ERA	Reference
Ernie Shore	2	2	17 2/3	12	4	6	3	9	2	0	0	1.53	
Babe Ruth	1	1	14	6	3	1	1	4	1	0	0	0.64	
Dutch Leonard	1	1	9	5	4	2	1	3	1	0	0	1.00	
Carl Mays	2	1	5 1/3	8	3	4	4	2	0	1	1	6.75	
Rube Foster	1	0	3	3	0	0	0	1	0	0	0	0.00	

=== Brooklyn Robins ===
==== Batting ====
Note: GP=Games played; AB=At bats; R=Runs; H=Hits; 2B=Doubles; 3B=Triples; HR=Home runs; RBI=Runs batted in; BB=Walks; AVG=Batting average; OBP=On base percentage; SLG=Slugging percentage

Player	GP	AB	R	H	2B	3B	HR	RBI	BB	AVG	OBP	SLG	Reference
Chief Meyers	3	10	0	2	0	1	0	0	1	.200	.273	.400	
Jake Daubert	4	17	1	3	0	1	0	0	2	.176	.263	.294	
George Cutshaw	5	19	2	2	1	0	0	1	1	.105	.190	.158	
Mike Mowrey	5	17	2	3	0	0	0	1	3	.176	.300	.176	
Ivy Olson	5	16	1	4	0	1	0	2	2	.250	.333	.375	
Zack Wheat	5	19	2	4	0	1	0	1	2	.211	.286	.316	
Hi Myers	5	22	2	4	0	0	1	3	0	.182	.217	.318	
Casey Stengel	4	11	2	4	0	0	0	0	0	.364	.364	.364	
Jimmy Johnston	3	10	1	3	0	1	0	0	1	.300	.364	.500	
Otto Miller	2	8	0	1	0	0	0	0	0	.125	.125	.125	
Fred Merkle	3	4	0	1	0	0	0	1	2	.250	.500	.250	
Gus Getz	1	1	0	0	0	0	0	0	0	.000	.000	.000	
Ollie O'Mara	1	1	0	0	0	0	0	0	0	.000	.000	.000	
Sherry Smith	1	5	0	1	1	0	0	0	0	.200	.200	.400	
Jeff Pfeffer	4	4	0	1	0	0	0	0	0	.250	.250	.250	
Rube Marquard	2	3	0	0	0	0	0	0	0	.000	.000	.000	
Jack Coombs	1	3	0	1	0	0	0	1	0	.333	.333	.333	
Larry Cheney	1	0	0	0	0	0	0	0	0	─	─	─	
Nap Rucker	1	0	0	0	0	0	0	0	0	─	─	─	
Wheezer Dell	1	0	0	0	0	0	0	0	0	─	─	─	

==== Pitching ====
Note: G=Games Played; GS=Games Started; IP=Innings Pitched; H=Hits; BB=Walks; R=Runs; ER=Earned Runs; SO=Strikeouts; W=Wins; L=Losses; SV=Saves; ERA=Earned Run Average

Player	G	GS	IP	H	BB	R	ER	SO	W	L	SV	ERA	Reference
Sherry Smith	1	1	13 1/3	7	6	2	2	2	0	1	0	1.35	
Jeff Pfeffer	3	1	10 2/3	7	4	5	2	5	0	1	1	1.69	
Rube Marquard	2	2	11	12	6	9	7	9	0	2	0	5.73	
Jack Coombs	1	1	6 1/3	7	1	3	3	1	1	0	0	4.26	
Larry Cheney	1	0	3	4	1	2	1	5	0	0	0	3.00	
Nap Rucker	1	0	2	1	0	0	0	3	0	0	0	0.00	
Wheezer Dell	1	0	1	1	0	0	0	0	0	0	0	0.00	
