= Raymond Haley =

American baseball player (1891–1973)

- Catcher
- Born: January 23, 1891; Danbury, Iowa, U.S.
- Died: October 8, 1973 (aged 82); Bradenton, Florida, U.S.

MLB debut
- April 21, 1915, for the Boston Red Sox

Last MLB appearance
- September 15, 1917, for the Philadelphia Athletics

MLB statistics
- Batting average: .248
- Home runs: 0
- Runs batted in: 15
- Stats at Baseball Reference

Teams
- Boston Red Sox (1915–1916); Philadelphia Athletics (1916–1917)

Raymond Timothy Haley (January 23, 1891 – October 8, 1973) was an American professional baseball catcher. He played in Major League Baseball (MLB) from 1915 through 1917 for the Boston Red Sox (1915–16) and Philadelphia Athletics (1916–17). He also had an extensive minor league baseball career, spanning 22 seasons from 1910 until 1931, both as a player and manager.

A native of Danbury, Iowa, Haley was signed by the Red Sox out of the Western Illinois University. Listed at 5 ft 11 in (1.80 m), 180 lb, Haley batted and threw right-handed. Most of his playing time came with the A's, serving as their third catcher behind Billy Meyer and Val Picinich in 1916, then Wally Schang and Meyer in 1917.

In his major league career, Haley was a .248 hitter (53-for-214) with 17 runs and 15 RBI in 81 games, including eight doubles, one triple, and two stolen bases. He did not hit a home run. As a catcher, he appeared in 71 games and collected 263 outs and 96 assists while committing 11 errors for a .970 fielding percentage.

Haley died in Bradenton, Florida at age 82.

== Sources ==
- Career statistics from Baseball Reference · Baseball Reference (Minors) · Baseball Almanac
