= Hick Cady =

American baseball player (1886–1946)

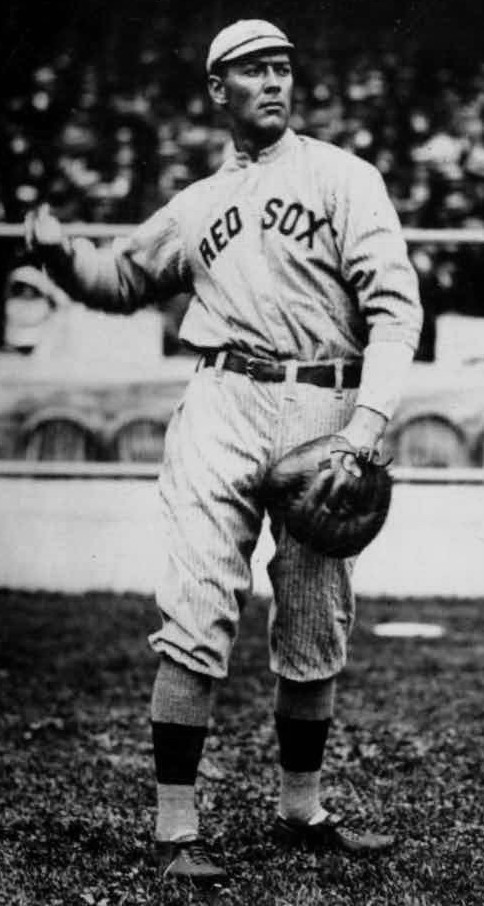
- Catcher
- Born: January 26, 1886; Bishop Hill, Illinois, U.S.
- Died: March 3, 1946 (aged 60); Cedar Rapids, Iowa, U.S.
- Batted: Right Threw: Right

MLB debut
- April 26, 1912, for the Boston Red Sox

Last MLB appearance
- July 9, 1919, for the Philadelphia Phillies

MLB statistics
- Batting average: .240
- Home runs: 1
- Runs batted in: 74
- Stats at Baseball Reference

Teams
- Boston Red Sox (1912–1917); Philadelphia Phillies (1919)

Forrest Leroy "Hick" Cady (January 26, 1886 – March 3, 1946) was an American professional baseball backup catcher in Major League Baseball who played for the Boston Red Sox (1912–17) and Philadelphia Phillies (1919). Cady batted and threw right-handed. He was born in Bishop Hill, Illinois.

In a seven-season career, Cady was a .240 hitter with one home run and 74 RBI in 355 games played.

Cady managed in the minors in 1922 and 1924.

Cady died in a hotel fire in Cedar Rapids, Iowa, at the age of 60.
