= Chick Shorten =

American baseball player (1892–1965)

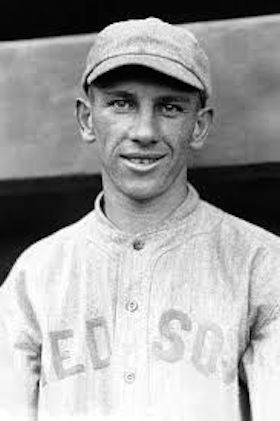
- Shorten in 1916
- Outfielder
- Born: April 19, 1892; Scranton, Pennsylvania, U.S.
- Died: October 23, 1965 (aged 73); Scranton, Pennsylvania, U.S.
- Batted: Left Threw: Left

MLB debut
- September 22, 1915, for the Boston Red Sox

Last MLB appearance
- September 24, 1924, for the Cincinnati Reds

MLB statistics
- Batting average: .275
- Home runs: 3
- Runs batted in: 138
- Stats at Baseball Reference

Teams
- Boston Red Sox (1915–1917); Detroit Tigers (1919–1921); St. Louis Browns (1922); Cincinnati Reds (1924)

Charles Henry "Chick" Shorten (April 19, 1892 – October 23, 1965) was an American baseball player. He played professional baseball as an outfielder for 18 years from 1911 to 1928, including eight seasons in Major League Baseball with the Boston Red Sox (1915–1917), Detroit Tigers (1919–1921), St. Louis Browns (1922), and Cincinnati Reds (1924). He was a member of the 1916 Red Sox team that won the World Series, and Shorten compiled a .571 batting average in the 1916 World Series. In eight major league seasons, Shorten appeared in 527 games, including 352 as an outfielder, and compiled a .275 career batting average.

== Early years ==
Shorten was born in Scranton, Pennsylvania, in 1892. The son of Irish immigrants, his father and two uncles ran a grocery business in Scranton. Shorten played two seasons of semi-pro baseball with the Minooka Blues.

== Professional baseball ==
=== Minor leagues ===
Shorten began playing professional baseball in August 1911 with his hometown Scranton baseball team in the New York State League. He next played for the Worcester Busters in the New England League from 1912 to 1914, compiling batting averages of .335 in 1913 and .345 in 1914. He spent most of the 1915 season with the Providence Grays of the International League. He compiled a .322 batting average in a career-high 615 at bats with Providence.

=== Boston Red Sox ===
On September 22, 1915, Shorten made his major league debut with the Boston Red Sox. He appeared in six games with the 1915 Red Sox, compiling a .214 batting average in 14 at bats.

In 1916, Shorten appeared in 53 games for the Red Sox, 13 as a starter in center field, eight as a starter in right field, and one start in left field. He compiled a .295 batting average and .352 on-base percentage in 124 plate appearances. The 1916 Red Sox won the American League pennant with a 91-63 record and defeated the Brooklyn Robins in the 1916 World Series. Shorten appeared in two games in the 1916 World Series for the Red Sox, and collected four hits and two RBIs in seven at-bats for a .571 batting average. He was also caught stealing twice in the series. Fifty years later, Shorten's Associated Press obituary described him as the "batting hero of the 1916 World Series."

In 1917, Shorten appeared in 69 games for the Red Sox, 22 as the team's starting center fielder, nine in left field, and four in right field. His batting average dropped precipitously by 116 points from .295 to .179.

=== Military service ===
After the 1917 season, Shorten was inducted into the United States Navy. He served at the Boston Navy Yard and underwent training at Wakefield, Massachusetts.

=== Detroit Tigers ===
On January 17, 1919, Shorten was traded by the Red Sox with Eddie Ainsmith and Slim Love to the Detroit Tigers in exchange for Ossie Vitt. Shorten was one of four Detroit outfielders to bat above .300 in 1919 – Shorten at .315 in 95 games, Ty Cobb at .384 in 124 games, Bobby Veach at .355 in 139 games, and Ira Flagstead at .331 in 97 games. Shorten remained with the Tigers for two more years, compiling batting averages of .288 in 1920 and .272 in 1921.

=== St. Louis and Cincinnati ===
In 1922, Shorten played for the St. Louis Browns. He appeared in 55 games, 13 as the starting center fielder and nine starts in right field and five in left field.

In 1923, Shorten was assigned to play in Nashville, refused to report, was suspended, and announced his retirement from the game. He was reinstated after one year and signed with the Cincinnati Reds. He appeared in 41 games for the 1924 Reds, mostly as a pinch hitter, and compiled a .275 batting average.

In eight major league seasons, Shorten appeared in 527 games, including 352 as an outfielder and the rest as a pinch hitter. He compiled a career batting average of .275 with 370 hits, 51 doubles, 20 triples, three home runs, and 138 RBIs. In 352 games in the outfield, Shorten had a .985 fielding percentage, 23 points higher than the average outfielder of that time.

=== Minor leagues ===
Although Shorten's major league career ended in 1924, he continued to play in the minor leagues for another four years - as the player-manager of the Reading Keystones in the International League in 1925, for the Newark Bears in 1926, and for the Scranton Miners in 1926 and 1927. He compiled a .354 batting average in 119 games in 1927 at age 35.

== Later years ==
After retiring from baseball, Shorten worked in his family's grocery store in Scranton. He also worked as a scout for the Cleveland Indians in the 1950s. Shorten died in 1965 at age 74 at his home in Scranton, Pennsylvania. He is buried in Abington Hills Cemetery.
