= Bill Carrigan =

American baseball player and manager (1883–1969)

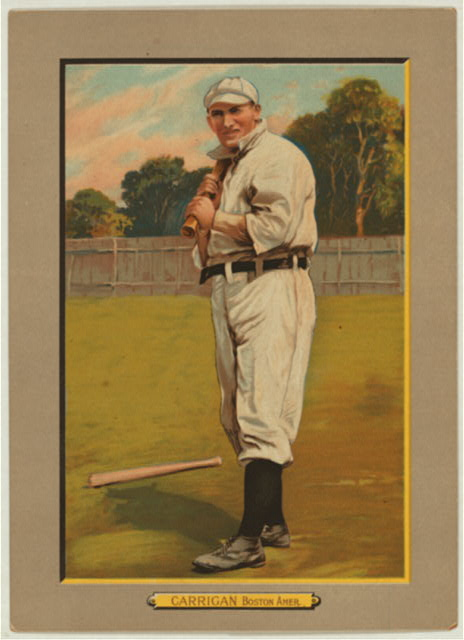
- Catcher / Manager
- Born: October 22, 1883; Lewiston, Maine, U.S.
- Died: July 8, 1969 (aged 85); Lewiston, Maine, U.S.
- Batted: Right Threw: Right

MLB debut
- July 7, 1906, for the Boston Americans

Last MLB appearance
- September 30, 1916, for the Boston Red Sox

MLB statistics
- Batting average: .257
- Home runs: 6
- Runs batted in: 235
- Games managed: 1,003
- Managerial record: 489–500
- Winning %: .494
- Stats at Baseball Reference
- Managerial record at Baseball Reference

Teams
- As player: Boston Americans/Red Sox (1906, 1908–1916); As manager: Boston Red Sox (1913–1916, 1927–1929)

Career highlights and awards
- 3× World Series champion (1912, 1915, 1916); Boston Red Sox Hall of Fame

William Francis Carrigan (October 22, 1883 – July 8, 1969), nicknamed "Rough", was an American Major League Baseball (MLB) catcher and manager. He played for the Boston Red Sox between 1906 and 1916, and he was a player-manager for the last four of those seasons. In 1915 and 1916, Carrigan's teams won back-to-back World Series. He was said to exert a positive influence on young Red Sox star Babe Ruth, serving as his roommate and his manager. He has the highest postseason winning percentage (.800) of any manager with multiple postseason appearances, and was named to the Honor Rolls of Baseball in 1946.

After his playing career, Carrigan was a partner in a large chain of New England vaudeville and movie theaters. He returned to the Red Sox as a manager between 1927 and 1929; the team finished in last place in each of those seasons. He then returned to his native Lewiston, where he was named a bank president in 1953 and where he died in 1969.

== Early life ==
Carrigan was born in Lewiston, Maine. Carrigan's brother John was a talented pitcher, and Carrigan served as his catcher. Carrigan played football and baseball at Lewiston High School; he also played roller polo, but it caused him to get into fights, and his brother pleaded with him to stop playing. He studied at College of the Holy Cross in Worcester, Massachusetts. At the time, Holy Cross was known for sending its baseball players to the major leagues.

== Early baseball career ==
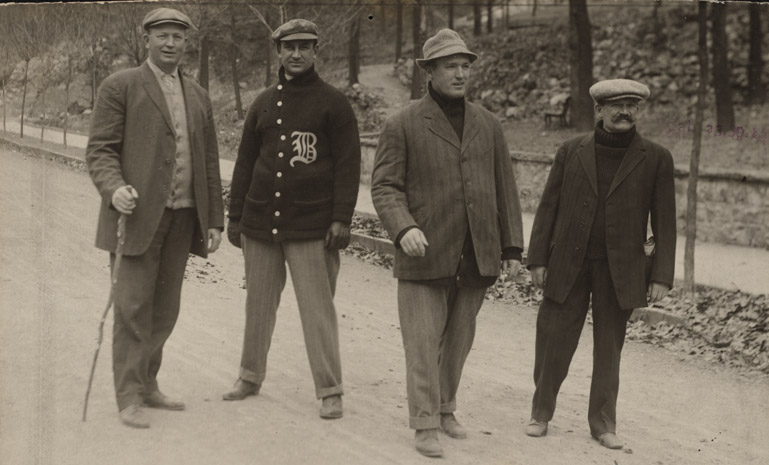
L to R: Cy Young, Jake Stahl, Carrigan and Michael T. McGreevy during spring training in 1912

Carrigan started his career as a platoon catcher and played all ten seasons with the Boston Red Sox. Biographer Richard A. Johnson noted that Carrigan was known in baseball for combining toughness with intelligence. For a portion of his time in Boston, Carrigan's roommate was Babe Ruth. "Carrigan served Ruth as a combination father confessor, drill sergeant, psychologist and Dutch uncle," wrote Johnson. Ruth called Carrigan the best manager he ever played for. Carrigan also had a close relationship with Detroit Tigers star Ty Cobb. Both Carrigan and Cobb were known for their intense play on the field, but they were friends and Cobb often came to Maine to visit Carrigan.

A schism was forming along religious lines among Red Sox players and coaches in the early 1910s. Players like Tris Speaker held anti-Catholic sentiments, and they supported their manager, Stahl. Carrigan was among a group of Catholics on the team who were more aligned with team co-owner Jimmy McAleer. Midway through the 1913 season, McAleer fired Stahl and made Carrigan a player-manager. Author Thomas Whalen writes that Speaker and Carrigan once had a fistfight, and Carrigan won the fight, helping him to establish a sense of authority.

The Red Sox finished in second place in 1914. In July of that year, they paid $25,000 to Baltimore of the International League for Babe Ruth, Ernie Shore and Ben Egan. Ruth gave up 21 hits in 23 innings pitched for the Red Sox that year.

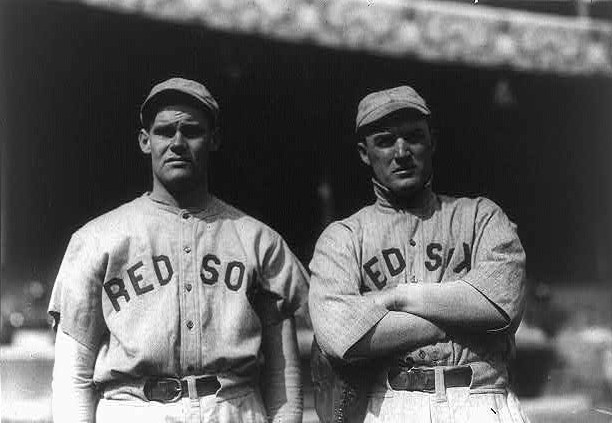
Hubert "Dutch" Leonard and Bill Carrigan (right), 1916

Carrigan received a dispensation from the Catholic Church to marry a Protestant woman, Beulah Bartlett, before the 1915 baseball season. They had been friends since childhood. Carrigan led the team to world championships in 1915 and 1916, compiling an 8–2 record as a manager in World Series play. Until Terry Francona duplicated the feat in 2007, he was the only manager to have won two World Series titles with Boston.

In August 1916, Carrigan approached Red Sox owner Joseph Lannin about the possibility of retiring soon. His father-in-law's death had left some family business outstanding. The next month he decided that he would step down at the end of the season, wanting to decrease the time he spent traveling. He was also looking to devote more attention to a movie theater partnership known as the Maine and New Hampshire Theater Corporation. Lannin had hoped that Carrigan would change his mind, but other things were on Carrigan's mind. He and his wife had a child, also named Beulah, in November, and they later had another daughter, Constance, and a son, William Jr.

== Hiatus from baseball ==
With Carrigan having turned down Lannin's pleas to remain manager of the Red Sox, and with Lannin having sold the team, new owner Harry Frazee named Jack Barry as Carrigan's successor in January 1917. Carrigan pursued his theater venture. The group owned as many as fifty theaters and there were three other partners in the corporation: a Lewiston man named William P. Gray; a former Mayor of Portsmouth, Albert Hyslop; and former New Hampshire Governor John H. Bartlett. In January 1922, Carrigan sold his interests in the corporation to Gray; the Washington Times said that Carrigan was thought to have received between $200,000 and $250,000.

== Return to the Red Sox ==
In the years after Carrigan's unexpected departure from the Red Sox, he was often the subject of rumors about a return to baseball. In the article announcing the sale of his theater shares, the Washington Times even speculated that he might be preparing to buy the Red Sox from Frazee. Carrigan did return to the Red Sox, but it was as a manager and not until 1927. He was unable to duplicate his previous success, as Boston finished in last place for three straight seasons.

By early December 1929, Carrigan said he was uncertain whether he would accept President Bob Quinn's offer to return as Red Sox manager. Despite the team's struggles, James O'Leary of The Boston Globe wrote that "Pres Quinn and every baseball fan in New England and throughout the entire American League circuit would like to see the veteran back on the job next season." Carrigan resigned on December 20.

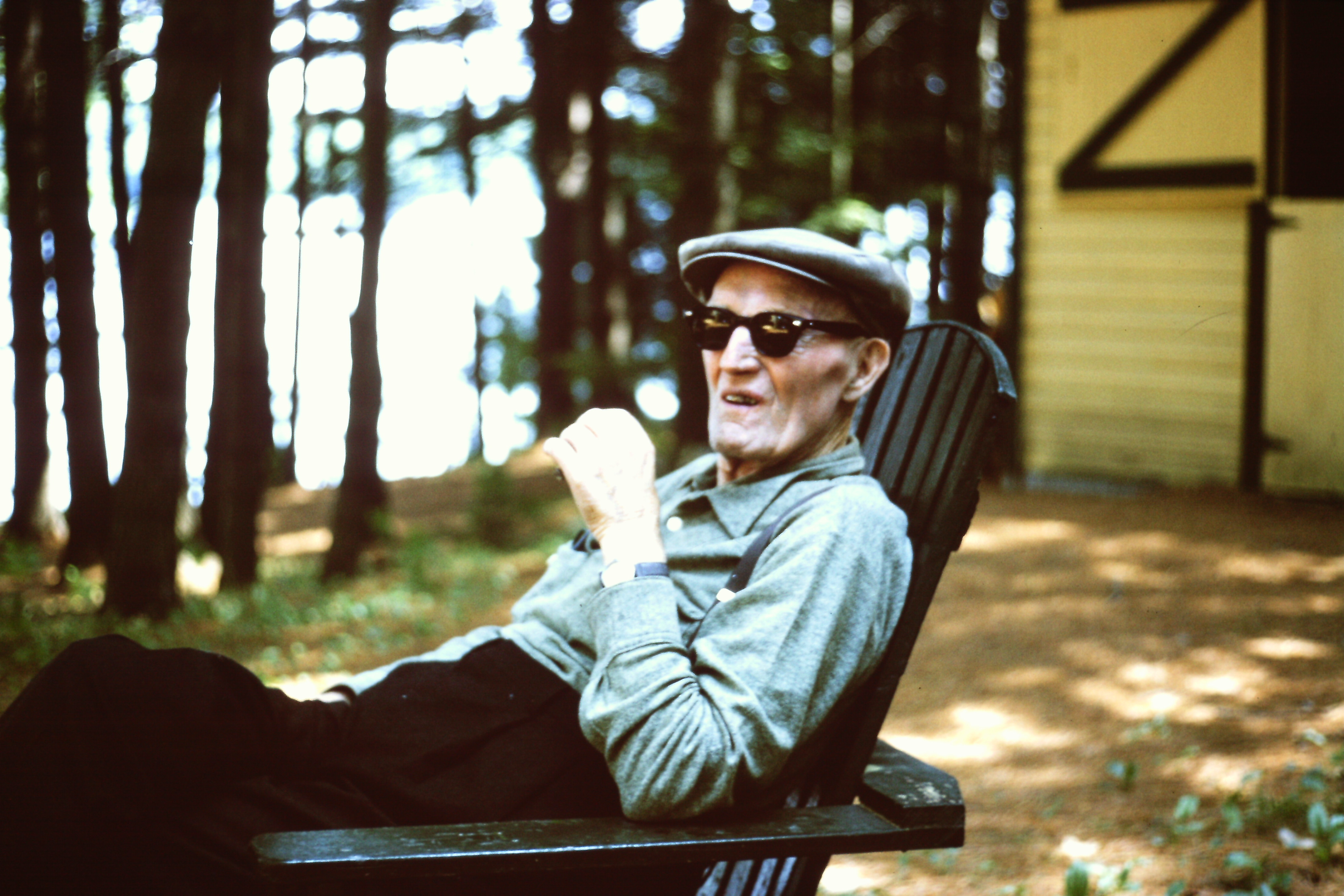
Carrigan at his summer home on Annabessacook Lake, Winthrop, Maine, July 1965

== Managerial record ==
Team	Year	Regular season					Postseason			
Team	Year	Games	Won	Lost	Win %	Finish	Won	Lost	Win %	Result
BOS	1913	70	40	30	.571	4th in AL	–	–	–	–
BOS	1914	153	91	62	.595	2nd in AL	–	–	–	–
BOS	1915	151	101	50	.669	1st in AL	4	1	.800	Won World Series (PHI)
BOS	1916	154	91	63	.591	1st in AL	4	1	.800	Won World Series (BKN)
BOS	1927	154	53	101	.344	8th in AL	–	–	–	–
BOS	1928	153	57	96	.373	8th in AL	–	–	–	–
BOS	1929	154	58	96	.377	8th in AL	–	–	–	–
Total		1,003 (Note: Carrigan also managed in fourteen games that ended in ties)	489	500	.494		8	2	.800	

== Later life ==
In 1933 and 1934, Carrigan was the head baseball coach at Bates College. In 1953, he was named president of People's Savings Bank in Lewiston. In 1958, Carrigan's wife died. Carrigan died at Central Maine General Hospital in Lewiston at the age of 85. He is buried at Lewiston's Riverside Cemetery. He was posthumously elected to the Boston Red Sox Hall of Fame in 2004.

== See also ==
- Honor Rolls of Baseball
- List of Major League Baseball player–managers
- List of Major League Baseball players who spent their entire career with one franchise
