= Dutch Leonard (left-handed pitcher) =

American baseball player (1892–1952)

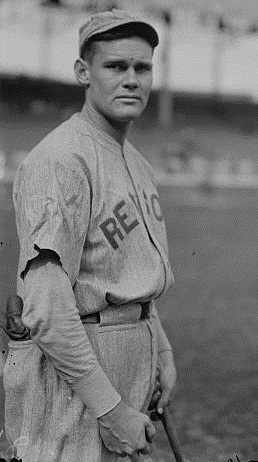
- Pitcher
- Born: April 16, 1892; Birmingham, Ohio, U.S.
- Died: July 11, 1952 (aged 60); Fresno, California, U.S.
- Batted: Left Threw: Left

MLB debut
- April 12, 1913, for the Boston Red Sox

Last MLB appearance
- July 19, 1925, for the Detroit Tigers

MLB statistics
- Win–loss record: 139–113
- Earned run average: 2.76
- Strikeouts: 1,160
- Stats at Baseball Reference

Teams
- Boston Red Sox (1913–1918); Detroit Tigers (1919–1921, 1924–1925)

Career highlights and awards
- 2× World Series champion (1915, 1916); AL ERA leader (1914); Pitched two no-hitters (1916, 1918); Boston Red Sox Hall of Fame

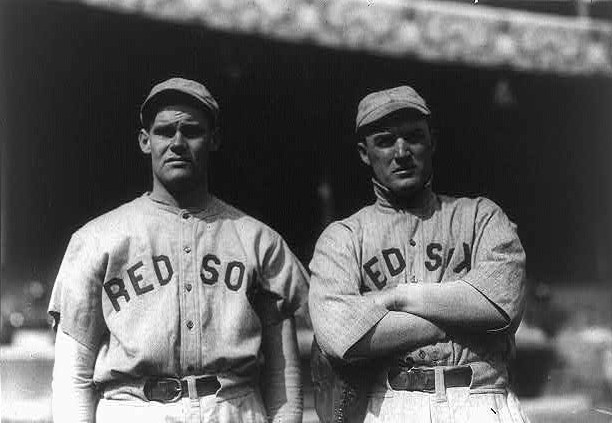
Hubert "Dutch" Leonard (left) and Bill Carrigan, 1916

Hubert Benjamin "Dutch" Leonard, (April 16, 1892 – July 11, 1952) was an American left-handed pitcher in Major League Baseball who had an 11-year career from 1913 to 1921, and 1924 to 1925. He played for the Boston Red Sox and Detroit Tigers and holds both the American League record and the major league modern-era record for the lowest single-season ERA of all time — 0.96 in 1914. (Note: The all-time record holder is Tim Keefe with a 0.86 ERA in 1880, which was pitched in an era where the pitcher hurled the ball from 50 feet, as opposed to the modern distance of 60 feet and six inches.)

He is not to be confused with Emil "Dutch" Leonard, a right-handed pitcher who pitched in the major leagues between 1933 and 1953.

== Early years ==
Born in Birmingham, Ohio, Leonard played baseball for Saint Mary's College of California, then located in Oakland, from 1910 to 1911. In 1912, he played for the Denver Grizzlies of the Western League, where he compiled a 22–9 record with 326 strikeouts and an ERA of 2.50.

== Boston Red Sox ==
Leonard debuted with the Boston Red Sox in 1913. He had a breakout season in his second year in the major leagues, 1914, leading the American League with a remarkable 0.96 ERA – the MLB record for single-season ERA when not counting Tim Keefe's record of 0.86 in his first MLB season, since it was only in 105 innings pitched. (The lowest ERA since then is Bob Gibson's 1.12 in 1968.) Leonard also pitched well in Boston's 1915 and 1916 World Series victories. He won Game 3 of the 1915 World Series, outduelling the Phillies' Grover Cleveland Alexander 2–1. He also won Game 4 of the 1916 World Series against the Brooklyn Robins.

Leonard also pitched two no-hitters for the Red Sox, the first in 1916 against the St. Louis Browns and the second in 1918 against the Detroit Tigers.

== Detroit Tigers ==
In January 1919, the Red Sox sold Leonard to the Detroit Tigers, where Leonard played from 1919 to 1921 and 1924–1925. Leonard became embroiled in a salary dispute with Tigers' owner Frank Navin in 1922, and Leonard opted to play for Fresno, in the San Joaquin Valley League in 1922 and 1923. Leonard was suspended by the American League for his actions, but he rejoined the Tigers in 1924 where he feuded with Tigers manager Ty Cobb. Leonard pitched in his final major league game on July 19, 1925.

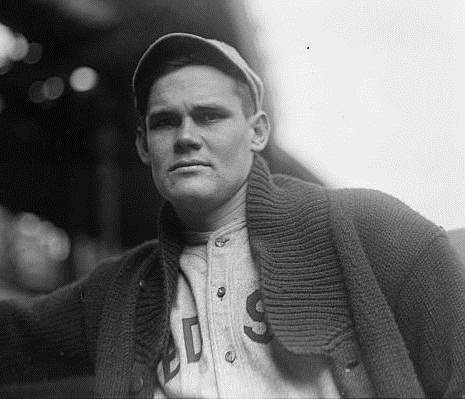
Dutch Leonard

== Dutch Leonard and Ty Cobb ==
Even before their player-manager feud, Leonard and Cobb had a history. In 1914, Leonard hit Cobb in the ribs with a fastball. In the next at bat, Cobb dragged a bunt which the Red Sox first baseman was forced to field; as Leonard's foot landed on the bag, Cobb's foot, spikes and all, landed on Leonard's, drawing blood.

A full feud broke when Cobb took over as the Tigers' manager in 1921. Cobb took pleasure in fining Leonard, who enjoyed late nights, for violating curfew. At one point in the 1921 season, Leonard was 11–13, despite a respectable ERA; Cobb left his office door open so that Leonard could hear him on the phone, faking a call: "I'm putting that damned Dutchman on waivers." In 1922, Leonard and Cobb fought over how to pitch to George Sisler and Tris Speaker. Leonard cursed Cobb to his face during the dispute, and Leonard ended up quitting the team in 1921, calling Cobb a "horse's ass."

When Leonard returned to the Tigers in 1924 after two seasons in the San Joaquin Valley League, the feud with Cobb resumed. By the middle of the 1925 season, Leonard was 11–3, but that did not stop Cobb from accusing Leonard of being a shirker. In front of the team, Cobb berated Leonard: "Don't you dare turn bolshevik on me. I'm the boss here." Leonard accused Cobb of over-working him, and Cobb responded in July 1925 by leaving Leonard on the mound for an entire game despite Leonard's giving up 20 hits and taking a 12–4 beating. After that, Leonard refused to pitch for Cobb. As a result, the Tigers put Leonard on waivers, and when no team picked him up, his baseball career came to an end.

Rumors began to spread that Leonard was claiming he "had something" on Cobb. Leonard was quoted as saying, "I am going to expose that bastard Cobb, I'll ruin him." And in 1926, Leonard sought his revenge, contacting American League president Ban Johnson and accusing Cobb of being involved in gambling and/or fixing games with Tris Speaker. Leonard claimed that Speaker and Cobb had conspired before a 1919 Tigers–Indians game to allow the Tigers to win, enabling the team to reach third place and qualify for World Series money. To corroborate his story, Leonard produced letters written at the time (one by Cobb and one by Smoky Joe Wood) that obliquely referred to gambling or game-fixing. When Johnson made Leonard's letter public in December 1926, it started a scandal.

Cobb was called to testify at a hearing before Commissioner Kenesaw Mountain Landis, and denied Leonard's allegations. Cobb noted that Leonard "had the reputation in the past of being a bolshevik on the club." Leonard declined to appear and testify at the hearing, saying he feared a physical attack from "that wild man." In the absence of Leonard's testimony, Landis found Cobb and Speaker not guilty.

== Career outside baseball ==
Leonard did well for himself after baseball. He became a very successful California fruit farmer and wine maker. He was also an expert left-handed golfer. Leonard died in 1952 at age 60 from complications of a stroke. He is buried at Mountain View Cemetery in Fresno, California. His estate at the time of his death was reportedly worth $2.1 million ($25,460,526 in 2021).

When Japanese Americans were forced into internment camps in 1942 by Executive Order 9066, most lost their homes and businesses forever. Dutch Leonard, however, promised to manage the farm of an interned Japanese American farmer. When the war ended, the farmer returned to his land and Dutch gave him $20,000 in profits accumulated over the intervening years. Dutch came through with his promise - a rarity in a time when Japanese Americans' businesses, farms, land and homes were typically pilfered or stolen.

== See also ==
- List of Major League Baseball annual ERA leaders
- List of Major League Baseball no-hitters

== Sources ==
- Bak, Richard (2005). Peach: Ty Cobb In His Time And Ours. Sports Media Group. ISBN 1-58726-257-6.
- Jones, David (2006). "Hubert Benjamin 'Dutch' Leonard", in Deadball Stars of the American League, SABR, Potomac Books.
- Stump, Al (1994). Cobb: The Life and Times of the Meanest Man Who Ever Played Baseball. Algonquin Books of Chapel Hill.

Awards and achievements
Preceded by Bullet Joe Bush; Babe Ruth & Ernie Shore	No-hitter pitcher August 30, 1916; June 3, 1918	Succeeded by Eddie Cicotte; Hod Eller
