= 1916 Philadelphia Athletics season =

Major League Baseball season

1916 Philadelphia Athletics
- League: American League
- Ballpark: Shibe Park
- City: Philadelphia
- Record: 36–117 (.235)
- League place: 8th
- Owners: Connie Mack, Benjamin Shibe, Tom Shibe, and John Shibe
- Managers: Connie Mack

The 1916 Philadelphia Athletics season was the 16th season of the Philadelphia Athletics baseball franchise. The team concluded the season in eighth place within the American League, achieving a record of 36 wins against 117 losses. Baseball historians frequently regard the 1916 Athletics as the poorest-performing team in the history of the American League, with a winning percentage of .235, which remains the lowest for any modern major league team since 1900. The 117 losses recorded by the team stood as a Major League Baseball record until the expansion New York Mets surpassed it in 1962, finishing with 120 losses but a slightly better winning percentage of .250.

== Regular season ==
=== Season standings ===
American League
| Team | W | L | Pct. | GB | Home | Road |
|---|---|---|---|---|---|---|
| Boston Red Sox | 91 | 63 | .591 | — | 49‍–‍28 | 42‍–‍35 |
| Chicago White Sox | 89 | 65 | .578 | 2 | 49‍–‍28 | 40‍–‍37 |
| Detroit Tigers | 87 | 67 | .565 | 4 | 49‍–‍28 | 38‍–‍39 |
| New York Yankees | 80 | 74 | .519 | 11 | 46‍–‍31 | 34‍–‍43 |
| St. Louis Browns | 79 | 75 | .513 | 12 | 45‍–‍32 | 34‍–‍43 |
| Cleveland Indians | 77 | 77 | .500 | 14 | 44‍–‍33 | 33‍–‍44 |
| Washington Senators | 76 | 77 | .497 | 14½ | 49‍–‍28 | 27‍–‍49 |
| Philadelphia Athletics | 36 | 117 | .235 | 54½ | 23‍–‍53 | 13‍–‍64 |

=== Record vs. opponents ===
1916 American League record Sources:
| Team | BOS | CWS | CLE | DET | NYY | PHA | SLB | WSH |
|---|---|---|---|---|---|---|---|---|
| Boston | — | 14–8 | 15–7 | 14–8 | 11–11 | 16–6 | 10–12–1 | 11–11–1 |
| Chicago | 8–14 | — | 13–9 | 13–9 | 10–12 | 18–4 | 15–7 | 12–10–1 |
| Cleveland | 7–15 | 9–13 | — | 11–11 | 12–10 | 18–4 | 11–11–2 | 9–13–1 |
| Detroit | 8–14 | 9–13 | 11–11 | — | 14–8–1 | 18–4 | 13–9 | 14–8 |
| New York | 11–11 | 12–10 | 10–12 | 8–14–1 | — | 15–7 | 9–13 | 15–7–1 |
| Philadelphia | 6–16 | 4–18 | 4–18 | 4–18 | 7–15 | — | 5–17 | 6–15–1 |
| St. Louis | 12–10–1 | 7–15 | 11–11–2 | 9–13 | 13–9 | 17–5 | — | 10–12–1 |
| Washington | 11–11–1 | 10–12–1 | 13–9–1 | 8–14 | 7–15–1 | 15–6–1 | 12–10–1 | — |

=== Roster ===
1916 Philadelphia Athletics
Roster
| Pitchers: Rube Bressler; Bullet Joe Bush; Cap Crowell; Michael Driscoll; George Hesselbacher; Jing Johnson; Axel Lindstrom; Bill Morrisette; Elmer Myers; Jack Nabors; Rube Parnham; Carl Ray; Jack Richardson; Socks Seibold; Tom Sheehan; Harry Weaver; Walt Whittaker; Marsh Williams; Weldon Wyckoff | Catchers: Doc Carroll; Raymond Haley; Billy Meyer; Mike Murphy; Val Picinich; Infielders: Sam Crane; Roy Grover; Thomas Healy; Nap Lajoie; Otis Lawry; Lew Malone; Lee McElwee; Stuffy McInnis; Charlie Pick; Harland Rowe; Whitey Witt | Outfielders: Jim Brown; Moxie Divis; Charlie Grimm; Bill Johnson; Lee King; Red Lanning; Ralph Mitterling; Rube Oldring; Wally Schang; Bill Stellbauer; Amos Strunk; Shag Thompson; Buck Thrasher; Jimmy Walsh; Other batters: Harry Davis | Manager: Connie Mack |

== Player stats ==
=== Batting ===
==== Starters by position ====
Note: Pos = Position; G = Games played; AB = At bats; H = Hits; Avg. = Batting average; HR = Home runs; RBI = Runs batted in

| Pos | Player | G | AB | H | Avg. | HR | RBI |
|---|---|---|---|---|---|---|---|
| C | Billy Meyer | 50 | 138 | 32 | .232 | 1 | 12 |
| 1B | Stuffy McInnis | 140 | 512 | 151 | .295 | 1 | 60 |
| 2B | Nap Lajoie | 113 | 426 | 105 | .246 | 2 | 35 |
| SS | Whitey Witt | 143 | 563 | 138 | .245 | 2 | 36 |
| 3B | Charlie Pick | 121 | 398 | 96 | .241 | 0 | 20 |
| OF | Wally Schang | 110 | 338 | 90 | .266 | 7 | 38 |
| OF | Amos Strunk | 150 | 544 | 172 | .316 | 3 | 49 |
| OF | Jimmy Walsh | 114 | 390 | 91 | .233 | 1 | 27 |

==== Other batters ====
Note: G = Games played; AB = At bats; H = Hits; Avg. = Batting average; HR = Home runs; RBI = Runs batted in

| Player | G | AB | H | Avg. | HR | RBI |
|---|---|---|---|---|---|---|
| Lee McElwee | 54 | 155 | 41 | .265 | 0 | 10 |
| Rube Oldring | 40 | 146 | 36 | .247 | 0 | 14 |
| Lee King | 42 | 144 | 27 | .188 | 0 | 8 |
| Otis Lawry | 41 | 123 | 25 | .203 | 0 | 4 |
| Val Picinich | 40 | 118 | 23 | .195 | 0 | 5 |
| Raymond Haley | 34 | 108 | 25 | .231 | 0 | 4 |
| Roy Grover | 20 | 77 | 21 | .273 | 0 | 7 |
| Bill Stellbauer | 25 | 48 | 13 | .271 | 0 | 5 |
| Jim Brown | 14 | 42 | 10 | .238 | 1 | 5 |
| Ralph Mitterling | 13 | 39 | 6 | .154 | 0 | 2 |
| Harland Rowe | 17 | 36 | 5 | .139 | 0 | 3 |
| Red Lanning | 19 | 33 | 6 | .182 | 0 | 1 |
| Buck Thrasher | 7 | 29 | 9 | .310 | 0 | 4 |
| Mike Murphy | 14 | 27 | 3 | .111 | 0 | 1 |
| Thomas Healy | 6 | 23 | 6 | .261 | 0 | 2 |
| Doc Carroll | 10 | 22 | 2 | .091 | 0 | 0 |
| Charlie Grimm | 12 | 22 | 2 | .091 | 0 | 0 |
| Shag Thompson | 15 | 17 | 0 | .000 | 0 | 0 |
| Bill Johnson | 4 | 15 | 4 | .267 | 0 | 1 |
| Moxie Divis | 3 | 6 | 1 | .167 | 0 | 1 |
| Lew Malone | 5 | 4 | 0 | .000 | 0 | 0 |
| Sam Crane | 2 | 4 | 1 | .250 | 0 | 0 |
| Harry Davis | 1 | 0 | 0 | ---- | 0 | 0 |

=== Pitching ===
==== Starting pitchers ====
Note: G = Games pitched; IP = Innings pitched; W = Wins; L = Losses; ERA = Earned run average; SO = Strikeouts

| Player | G | IP | W | L | ERA | SO |
|---|---|---|---|---|---|---|
| Elmer Myers | 44 | 315.0 | 14 | 23 | 3.66 | 182 |
| Bullet Joe Bush | 40 | 286.2 | 15 | 24 | 2.57 | 157 |
| Jack Nabors | 40 | 212.2 | 1 | 20 | 3.47 | 74 |
| Jing Johnson | 12 | 84.1 | 2 | 8 | 3.74 | 25 |
| Rube Parnham | 4 | 24.2 | 2 | 1 | 4.01 | 8 |

==== Other pitchers ====
Note: G = Games pitched; IP = Innings pitched; W = Wins; L = Losses; ERA = Earned run average; SO = Strikeouts

| Player | G | IP | W | L | ERA | SO |
|---|---|---|---|---|---|---|
| Tom Sheehan | 38 | 188.0 | 1 | 16 | 3.69 | 54 |
| Marsh Williams | 10 | 51.1 | 0 | 6 | 7.89 | 17 |
| Cap Crowell | 9 | 39.2 | 0 | 5 | 4.99 | 15 |
| George Hesselbacher | 6 | 26.0 | 0 | 4 | 7.27 | 6 |
| Red Lanning | 6 | 24.1 | 0 | 3 | 8.14 | 9 |
| Socks Seibold | 3 | 21.2 | 1 | 2 | 4.15 | 5 |
| Weldon Wyckoff | 7 | 21.1 | 0 | 1 | 5.48 | 4 |
| Rube Bressler | 4 | 15.0 | 0 | 2 | 6.60 | 8 |
| Carl Ray | 3 | 9.1 | 0 | 1 | 4.82 | 5 |

==== Relief pitchers ====
Note: G = Games pitched; W = Wins; L = Losses; SV = Saves; ERA = Earned run average; SO = Strikeouts

| Player | G | W | L | SV | ERA | SO |
|---|---|---|---|---|---|---|
| Harry Weaver | 3 | 0 | 0 | 0 | 10.13 | 2 |
| Michael Driscoll | 1 | 0 | 1 | 0 | 5.40 | 0 |
| Axel Lindstrom | 1 | 0 | 0 | 0 | 4.50 | 1 |
| Bill Morrisette | 1 | 0 | 0 | 0 | 6.75 | 2 |
| Walt Whittaker | 1 | 0 | 0 | 0 | 4.50 | 0 |
| Jack Richardson | 1 | 0 | 0 | 0 | 40.50 | 1 |

== Awards and honors ==
=== League top five finishers ===
- Bullet Joe Bush: #4 in AL in strikeouts (157)
- Bullet Joe Bush: #3 in AL in shutouts (8)
- Bullet Joe Bush: #3 in AL in complete games (25)
- Bullet Joe Bush: MLB leader in losses (24)
- Bullet Joe Bush: MLB leader in wild pitches (15)
- Bullet Joe Bush: #2 in AL in walks allowed (130)
- Elmer Myers: #2 in AL in strikeouts (182)
- Elmer Myers: #2 in AL in complete games (31)
- Elmer Myers: #2 in AL in losses (23)
- Elmer Myers: MLB leader in earned runs allowed (128)
- Elmer Myers: #2 in AL in hits allowed (280)
- Elmer Myers: MLB leader in walks allowed (168)
- Elmer Myers: #2 in AL in home runs allowed (7)
- Elmer Myers: #2 in AL in wild pitches (13)
- Elmer Myers: #2 in AL in hit batsmen (14)
- Jack Nabors: #3 in AL in losses (20)
- Amos Strunk: #4 in AL in batting average (.316)

== See also ==
- List of worst Major League Baseball season records
