= 1894 in baseball =

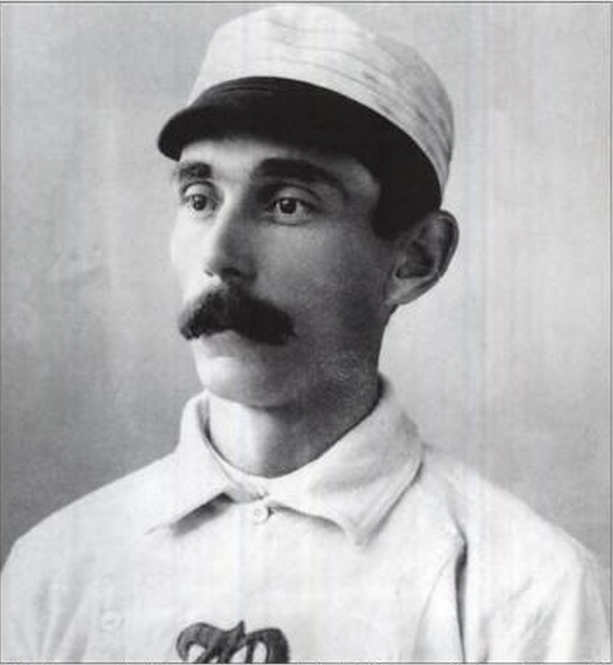
Bobby Lowe

The following are the baseball events of the year 1894 throughout the world.

== Champions ==
- Temple Cup: New York Giants over Baltimore Orioles (4–0)
- National League: Baltimore Orioles

== Statistical leaders ==
National League
Stat	Player	Total
AVG	Hugh Duffy (BSN)	.440
HR	Hugh Duffy (BSN)	18
RBI	Sam Thompson (PHI)	149
W	Amos Rusie^{1} (NYG)	36
ERA	Amos Rusie^{1} (NYG)	2.78
K	Amos Rusie^{1} (NYG)	195

^{1} National League Triple Crown pitching winner

== National League final standings ==
National League
Team	W	L	Pct.	GB	Home	Road
Baltimore Orioles	89	39	.695	—	52‍–‍15	37‍–‍24
New York Giants	88	44	.667	3	49‍–‍17	39‍–‍27
Boston Beaneaters	83	49	.629	8	44‍–‍19	39‍–‍30
Philadelphia Phillies	71	57	.555	18	48‍–‍20	23‍–‍37
Brooklyn Grooms	70	61	.534	20½	42‍–‍24	28‍–‍37
Cleveland Spiders	68	61	.527	21½	35‍–‍24	33‍–‍37
Pittsburgh Pirates	65	65	.500	25	46‍–‍28	19‍–‍37
Chicago Colts	57	75	.432	34	35‍–‍30	22‍–‍45
St. Louis Browns	56	76	.424	35	34‍–‍32	22‍–‍44
Cincinnati Reds	55	75	.423	35	37‍–‍28	18‍–‍47
Washington Senators	45	87	.341	46	32‍–‍30	13‍–‍57
Louisville Colonels	36	94	.277	54	24‍–‍38	12‍–‍56

Locations of teams for the 1893–1895 National League seasons
National League

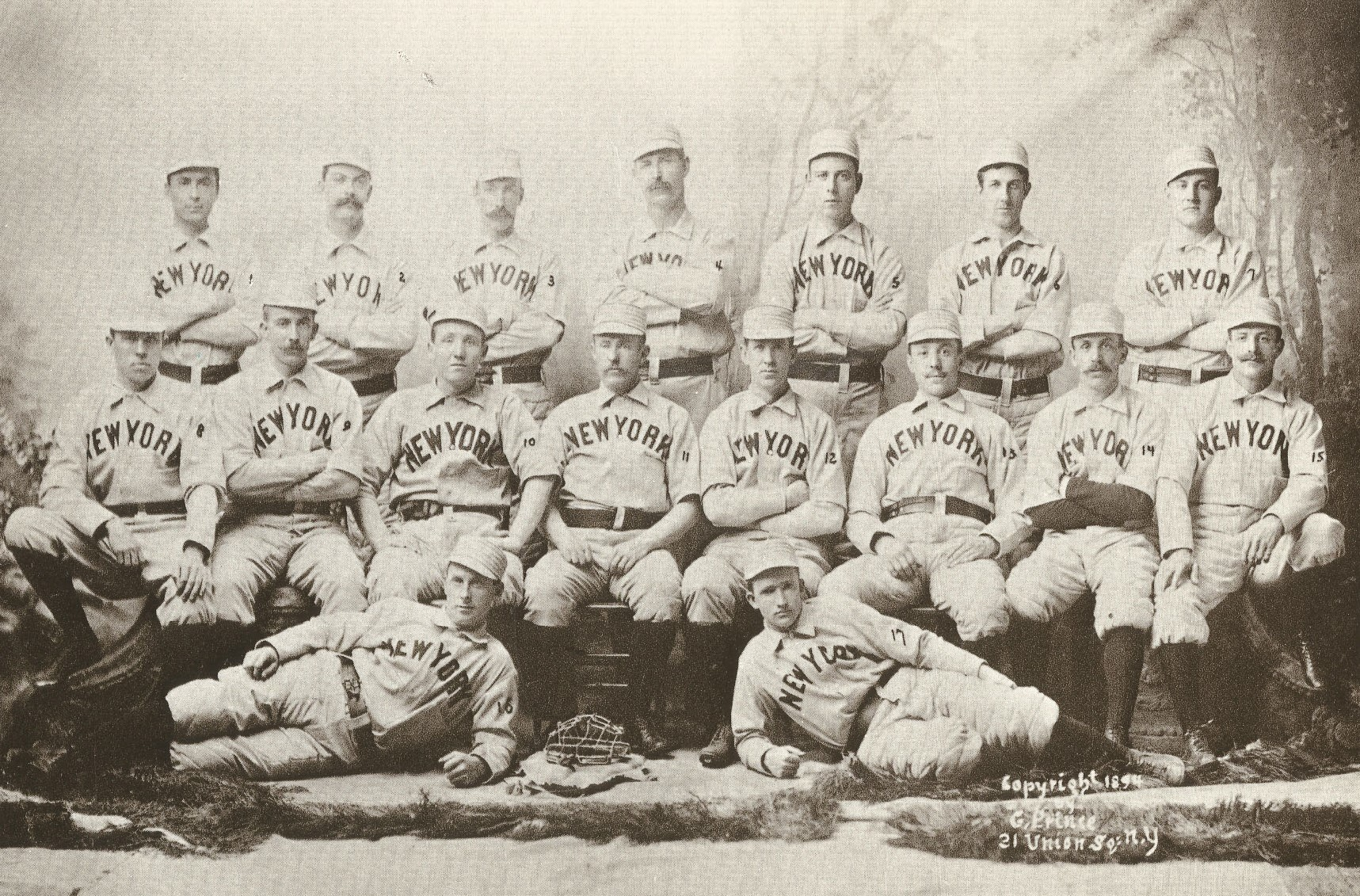
1894 New York Giants

== Notable seasons ==
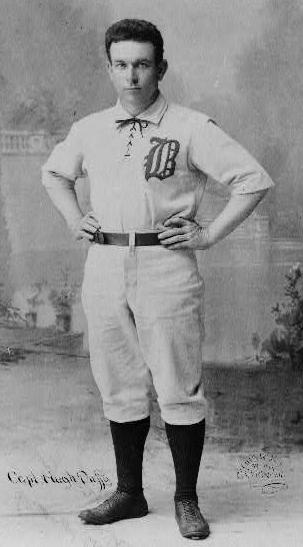
Hugh Duffy

- Boston Beaneaters center fielder Hugh Duffy set the MLB single-season record for batting average (.440). He also led the NL in hits (237), home runs (18), total bases (374), and runs scored (160). He was second in the NL in slugging percentage (.694) and runs batted in (145). He was third in the NL in on-base percentage (.502) and adjusted OPS+ (173).
- New York Giants pitcher Amos Rusie had a win–loss record of 36–13 and led the NL in wins (36), earned run average (2.78), adjusted ERA+ (188), and strikeouts (195). He was second in the NL in innings pitched (444).

== Events ==
- April 24 – Lave Cross of the Philadelphia Phillies hits for the cycle as the Phillies crush the Brooklyn Bridegrooms, 22–5.
- May 30 – Second baseman Bobby Lowe of the Boston Beaneaters becomes the first player in Major League history to hit four home runs in a game, hitting two in a nine-run 3rd inning. Boston tops the Cincinnati Reds, 20–11.
- June 13 – Bill Hassamaer outfielder/infielder for the Washington Senators hits for the cycle against the St. Louis Browns. Washington wins, 12–3.
- July 10 – Jerry Denny of the Louisville Colonels becomes the final position player to play a Major League game without wearing a glove.
- August 4 – Baker Bowl, the home stadium of the Philadelphia Phillies, burns down in a fire. The Phillies are forced to play their remaining games at the University of Philadelphia.
- August 17 – Philadelphia Phillies outfielder Sam Thompson hits for the cycle as the Phillies crush the Louisville Colonels, 29–4.
- September 3 – The Baltimore Orioles set a Major League record for most triples in a game, with nine against the Cleveland Spiders.
- September 28 – Cincinnati Reds pitcher Tom Parrott hits for the cycle against the New York Giants. New York wins, however, 9–8.

== Births ==
=== January ===
- January 1 – Hack Miller
- January 2 – Bill Wagner
- January 3
  - John Fluhrer
  - Tom Whelan
- January 8 – Art Ewoldt
- January 9
  - Billy Lee
  - Ira Townsend
- January 14 – Art Decatur
- January 16 – Moxie Divis
- January 18 – Danny Clark
- January 25 – Charlie Whitehouse
- January 27 – Joe Weiss
- January 29 – Otto Rettig
- January 31 – Stuffy Stewart

=== February ===
- February 1
  - Walt Golvin
  - Rube Parnham
- February 4 – Vern Spencer
- February 6 – Pelham Ballenger
- February 7 – Charlie Jackson
- February 10
  - Herb Pennock
  - Cotton Tierney
- February 13 – Billy Martin
- February 19 – Ernie Cox
- February 20 – Suds Sutherland
- February 22
  - Tom Grubbs
  - Bill Hall
- February 23 – José Rodríguez
- February 27 – Bob Cone
- February 28 – Jud Wilson

=== March ===
- March 2 – Elmer Myers
- March 7
  - Frank Gleich
  - Merwin Jacobson
- March 10
  - Fred Johnson
  - Jack Wieneke
- March 14 – Gene Layden
- March 17 – Ralph Shafer
- March 19
  - Red Torkelson
  - Bill Wambsganss
- March 20 – Bill Stellbauer
- March 28 – Lee King
- March 29
  - Dixie Leverett
  - Alex McColl
  - Bob Steele
- March 31
  - Ben Mallonee
  - Tom Sheehan

=== April ===
- April 1
  - Robert Bonner
  - Hal Reilly
- April 2 – Harry O'Donnell
- April 5 – Jim Sullivan
- April 7
  - Fred Lear
  - Horace Milan
- April 13
  - Pat Martin
  - Lizzie Murphy
  - Squiz Pillion
- April 15 – Red Gunkel
- April 19 – John Donahue
- April 21 – Charlie Maisel
- April 22 – Jake Pitler
- April 24 – Howard Ehmke

=== May ===
- May 1 – Paul Carter
- May 3 – Cliff Markle
- May 8 – Roy Wilkinson
- May 15 – Eddie Stumpf
- May 16 – Paddy Smith
- May 17 – Frank Woodward
- May 22 – Hooks Warner
- May 23 – Lee McElwee
- May 25 – Joe Judge
- May 26 – Bill Fincher
- May 27 – Frank Snyder
- May 30
  - Al Mamaux
  - Twink Twining
- May 31 – John Sullivan

=== June ===
- June 10
  - Fred Hofmann
  - Roy Sanders
- June 11
  - Jack Calvo
  - Walt Whittaker
- June 13 – Henry Baldwin
- June 15
  - Mike Cantwell
  - Norm Glockson
- June 16 – Bob Glenn
- June 27
  - Red Bluhm
  - Joe Connolly

=== July ===
- July 5 – Hod Eller
- July 10 – Jim Walsh
- July 12 – Lee Meadows
- July 13
  - Ed Corey
  - George Cunningham
- July 16
  - Howdy Caton
  - Rich Gee
- July 18
  - Wilbur Fisher
  - Bill Haeffner
  - Carl Stimson
- July 19 – George Brickley
- July 25 – Red Holt
- July 26 – Larry Woodall
- July 28 – John Glaiser
- July 30
  - Bill Cunningham
  - Chuck Ward

=== August ===
- August 3
  - George Hale
  - Harry Heilmann
- August 4
  - Sid Benton
  - Jim Grant
- August 9
  - Leo Kavanagh
  - Johnny Mitchell
- August 12 – Paul Carpenter
- August 23 – Roy Leslie
- August 24 – Jimmy Cooney
- August 25 – Buzz Wetzel
- August 26 – Sparky Adams
- August 27
  - Carl East
  - Eddie Mulligan
- August 29 – Gus Bono
- August 30 – Bing Miller
- August 31 – Norman Glaser

=== September ===
- September 1 – Fred Nicholson
- September 4
  - Leo Dixon
  - Fred Worden
- September 6 – Billy Gleason
- September 12 – Ole Olsen
- September 13
  - Sam Crane
  - Dink O'Brien
- September 22 – Frank Walker
- September 24 – Otto Neu
- September 27 – Mike Loan

=== October ===
- October 1
  - Ray Kolp
  - Duster Mails
- October 9 – Jing Johnson
- October 10 – Myrl Brown
- October 11 – Gary Fortune
- October 12 – John Merritt
- October 13
  - Bob Allen
  - Swede Risberg
- October 16 – Mike Menosky
- October 18 – Phil Morrison
- October 19 – Tim McCabe
- October 20
  - Toots Coyne
  - Wickey McAvoy
- October 23 – Rube Bressler
- October 27 – Charlie Bold
- October 28 – John Bischoff
- October 30 – Harley Dillinger
- October 31
  - Ken Crawford
  - Ray O'Brien

=== November ===
- November 1 – Clarence Berger
- November 4 – Bill Shanner
- November 13
  - Ernie Neitzke
  - Ray Steineder
- November 18 – Sam Covington
- November 20 – Rube Ehrhardt
- November 21 – Bill Morrisette
- November 23
  - Art Corcoran
  - Jesse Petty

=== December ===
- December 1 – Ernie Alten
- December 5 – Philip K. Wrigley
- December 6
  - Bruno Betzel
  - Walter Mueller
- December 8 – Razor Ledbetter
- December 10 – Ike Caveney
- December 11 – Lou Raymond
- December 12 – Charlie Blackwell
- December 13 – Larry Jacobus
- December 14
  - Stan Baumgartner
  - Jim Joe Edwards
- December 19 – Ford Frick
- December 20 – Butch Henline
- December 22 – Hervey McClellan
- December 29 – Hank DeBerry
- December 31
  - Joe Berry
  - Jim Murray

== Deaths ==
- January 6 – Marty Sullivan, 31, outfielder who hit .273 in 398 games for the White Stockings, Hoosiers, Beaneaters, and Spiders from 1887 to 1891.
- February 28 – Edgar McNabb, 28, pitcher for the 1893 Baltimore Orioles of the National League.
- March 3 – Ned Williamson, 36, third baseman and shortstop for the Chicago White Stockings, who set single-season records with 49 doubles in 1883, 27 home runs in 1884, while leading the National League in assists seven times and double plays six times.
- March 24 – Mike Jones, 28, Canadian pitcher for the 1890 American Association champion Louisville Colonels.
- April 3 – Billy Redmond, 41, shortstop who played for three different teams in two leagues between 1875 and 1878.
- April 29 – Sparrow McCaffrey, 26, catcher for the 1889 Columbus Solons of the American Association.
- May 3 – Bob Ferguson, 49, infielder and manager of eight teams, known as sport's first switch-hitter and nicknamed "Death to Flying Things" for defensive skill, who captained an 1870 team which defeated Cincinnati Red Stockings after 84 straight wins, was president of National Association from 1872 to 1875, and set record for career games as umpire.
- May 19 – Bill Mountjoy, 35, Canadian pitcher who posted a 31–24 record and a 3.25 ERA for the Cincinnati and Baltimore National League teams from 1883 to 1885.
- June 23 – Jimmy Say, 32, third baseman/shortstop for five different teams in three leagues between 1882 and 1887.
- August 25 – Yank Robinson, 34, second baseman for six teams of four different leagues, most prominently for the St. Louis Browns squads that won four American Association pennants from 1885 to 1888 and the 1886 World Series.
- August 28 – Gracie Pierce, [?], second baseman and outfielder for five different teams in two leagues from 1882 through 1884, who later umpired in the National League and the Players' League.
- September 16 – Terry Larkin, 38, National League pitcher and an 89-game winner from 1877 to 1879, who committed suicide by slitting his throat with a razor.
- September 26 – Nick Reeder, 27, third baseman who played one game for the 1891 Louisville Colonels of the American Association.
- October 16 – Ed Conley, 30, pitcher for the 1884 Providence Grays of the National League.
- November 2
  - William Houseman, 35, pitcher for the 1886 Baltimore Orioles of the American Association.
  - Alamazoo Jennings, 43, catcher for the 1878 Milwaukee Grays of the National League; worked intermittently as an umpire between 1882 and 1891 in the American Association and Union Association.
- November 8 – King Kelly, 36, Hall of Fame catcher and right fielder for the Chicago and Boston National League teams, known as a fiery and alert competitor that developed the hit-and-run and caused numerous refinements of sport's rules upon his exploitation of loopholes, who batted .308 lifetime with two batting titles, led the league in runs and doubles three times each, starred on five Chicago champion teams, and managed Boston to the 1890 Players' League title.
- December 24 – Charlie Duffee, 28, outfielder for four teams in two different leagues, who led all American Association outfielders in assists in the 1889 and 1891 seasons.
- December 25 – Tom Cahill, 26, utility player for the 1891 Louisville Colonels of the American Association.
- December 30 – Jack McMahon, 25, first baseman and catcher who played from 1892 to 1893 for the New York Giants of the National League.
