= Ralph Shinners =

American baseball player (1895–1962)

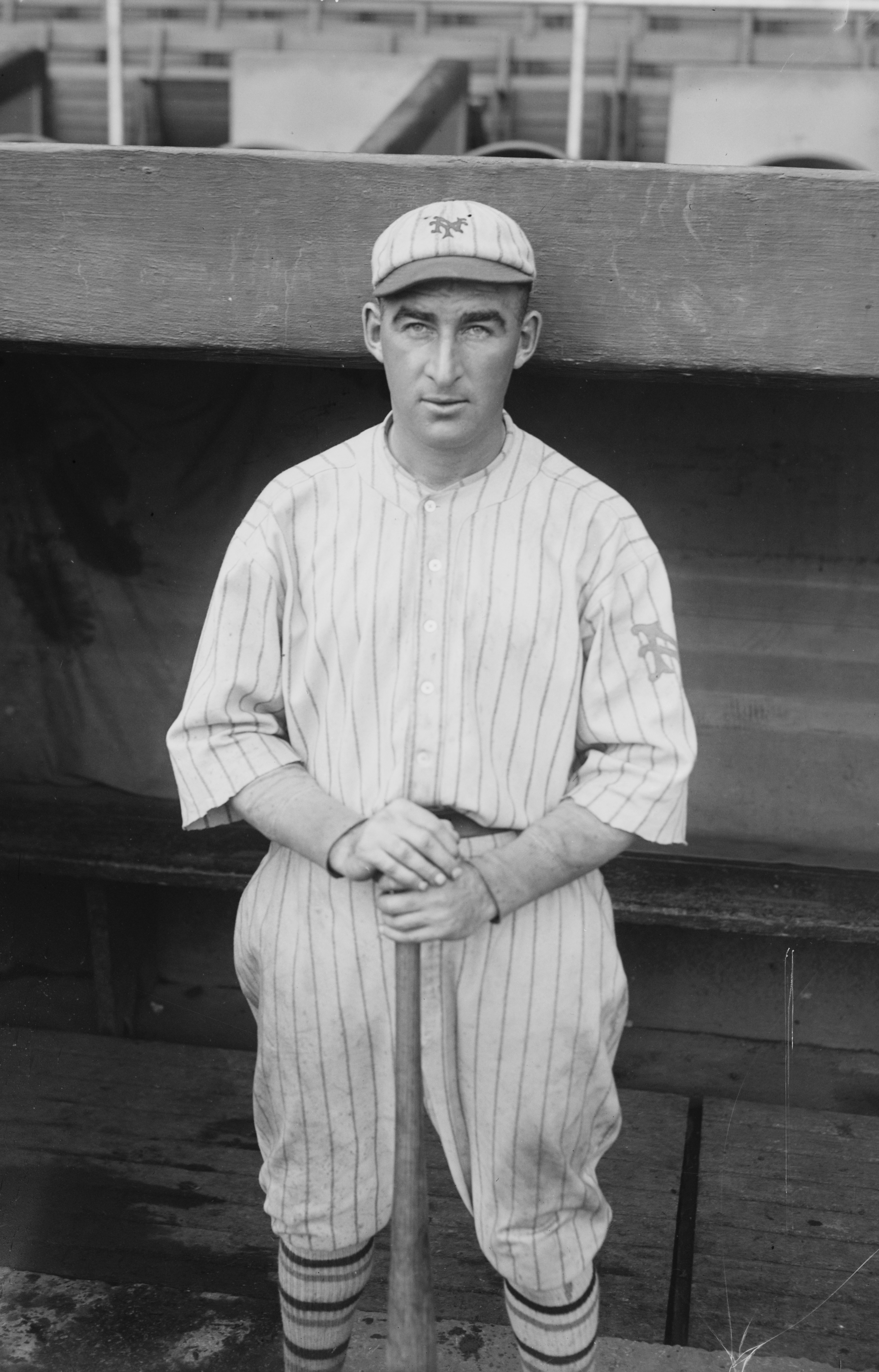
- Center fielder
- Born: October 4, 1895; Monches, Wisconsin, U.S.
- Died: July 23, 1962 (aged 66); Milwaukee, Wisconsin, U.S.
- Batted: Right Threw: Right

MLB debut
- April 12, 1922

Last MLB appearance
- September 23, 1925

Career statistics
- Batting average: .276
- Home runs: 7
- Runs batted in: 51

Teams
- New York Giants (1922–1923); St. Louis Cardinals (1925)

Ralph Peter Shinners (October 4, 1895 – July 23, 1962) was an American center fielder in Major League Baseball who played from 1922 through 1925 for the New York Giants and St. Louis Cardinals. Listed at 6 ft 0 in (1.83 m), 180 lb, Shinners batted and threw right-handed.

== Brief profile ==
Born in Monches, Wisconsin, Shinners is the one of three major league players to come out of the Marquette University in Milwaukee, Wisconsin (the others being Mike Jurewicz and Skip Lockwood, both of whom studied at Marquette but never played for the university). He enjoyed a solid career in the Minor leagues, hitting a .300 batting average or more in seven out of nine possible seasons. Shinners was used sparingly in the major leagues for three seasons, but he never was able to fulfill the potential that he showed in the minors.

== Professional career ==
Shinners started his professional career in 1920 with the American Association Indianapolis Indians, playing for them two years. In 1921 he fairly blazed in the league, batting .346 and stealing 52 bases in 164 games with Indianapolis, more than any other player in organized baseball was credited with. He also hit 50 doubles, 26 triples and 13 home runs for a .552 slugging percentage. Late in the year, New York Giants manager John McGraw obtained Shinners, sending to the Indians in return for him outfielders Eddie Brown and Vern Spencer, two other players to be named later, and $25,000 in cash.

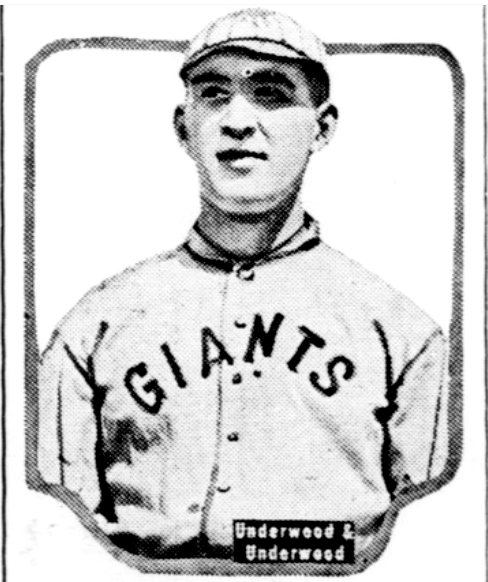
Shinners with the Giants in 1922.

Shinners played briefly for the Giants in part of two seasons, being a member of two World Series champion teams in 1922 and 1923, though he did not play in the Series. At the end of the 1924 season, he was sent by the Giants to Double-A Toledo Mud Hens in exchange for outfielder Lee King.

In 1924 Shinners hit .300 in 148 games for Toledo, before joining the Cardinals in 1925 for his last major league season. In St. Louis, he posted a .295 average with seven home runs and 36 runs batted in in 74 games, while serving as a backup for outfielders Ray Blades, Chick Hafey and Heinie Mueller.

In a three-year major league career, Shinners hit .276 (110-for-399) with 14 doubles, four triples, seven homers and 11 stolen bases in 74 games, driving in 51 runs while scoring 60 times.

Again in the minors, Shinners collected averages of .350 (1928), .337 (1929) and .310 (1930), retiring after the 1931 season. He connected 1294 hits in 4189 at-bats (.309) in 1152 minor league games.

Shinners also managed the Kenosha Comets of the All-American Girls Professional Baseball League during the 1947 season. He then moved to Milwaukee, Wisconsin, where he died at the age of 66.

== Career timeline ==
Year	Club	League	Position
1920	Indianapolis Indians	AA	Outfielder
1921	Indianapolis Indians	AA	Outfielder
1922	New York Giants	NL	Outfielder
1923	New York Giants	NL	Outfielder
1924	Toledo Mud Hens	AA	Outfielder
1925	St. Louis Cardinals	NL	Outfielder
1926	Oakland Oaks	PCL	Outfielder
1927	Oakland Oaks	PCL	Outfielder
1928	Fort Worth Panthers; Toronto Maple Leafs	TL; IL	Outfielder
1929	Toronto Maple Leafs	IL	Outfielder
1930	Buffalo Bisons; Newark Bears	IL	Outfielder
1931	Buffalo Bisons	IL	Outfielder
1947	Kenosha Comets	AAGPBL	Manager
