= Lee King (outfielder) =

American baseball player (1892–1967)

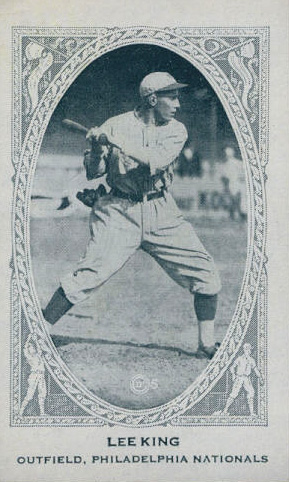
- Outfielder
- Born: December 26, 1892; Hundred, West Virginia, U.S.
- Died: September 16, 1967 (aged 74); Shinnston, West Virginia, U.S.
- Batted: Right Threw: Right

MLB debut
- September 20, 1916, for the Pittsburgh Pirates

Last MLB appearance
- October 1, 1922, for the New York Giants

MLB statistics
- Batting average: .247
- Home runs: 15
- Runs batted in: 144
- Stats at Baseball Reference

Teams
- Pittsburgh Pirates (1916–1918); New York Giants (1919–1921); Philadelphia Phillies (1921–1922); New York Giants (1922)

Career highlights and awards
- World Series champion (1922)

Edward Lee King (December 26, 1892 – September 16, 1967) was an American professional baseball outfielder. (Edward) Lee played in Major League Baseball (MLB) from 1916 to 1922 for the Pittsburgh Pirates, New York Giants, and Philadelphia Phillies.

King was a member of the 1921 and 1922 New York Giants, teams that won back-to-back World Series. Lee drove in the final run of the 1922 World Series with a line drive single to left field off Bullet Joe Bush for his victorious team, the New York Giants. It came in his only at-bat in a World Series game. His perfect 1.000 batting average and 1.000 OPS are World Series records. That at bat was his final one in the major leagues. He continued playing professionally in the minor leagues from 1923-1927.

He had 294 hits in a seven-year career, with a batting average of .247 along with 15 home runs and 144 RBI.

Another outfielder with exactly the same name, Edward Lee King, born two years later, also played Major League Baseball, both men going by their middle names, Lee.
