= Walt Whittaker =

American baseball player

- Pitcher
- Born: June 11, 1894; Chelsea, Massachusetts, U.S.
- Died: August 7, 1965 (aged 71); Pembroke, Massachusetts, U.S.
- Batted: Left Threw: Right

MLB debut
- July 6, 1916, for the Philadelphia Athletics

Last MLB appearance
- July 6, 1916, for the Philadelphia Athletics

MLB statistics
- Win–loss record: 0–0
- Earned run average: 4.50
- Strikeouts: 0
- Stats at Baseball Reference

Teams
- Philadelphia Athletics (1916)

Walter Elton Whittaker (June 11, 1894 – August 9, 1965), nicknamed "Doc", was an American professional baseball pitcher who played in Major League Baseball for the Philadelphia Athletics in a single game in 1916.

== Biography ==
A native of Chelsea, Massachusetts, Whittaker played baseball at Somerville High School, where he was the winning pitcher in eight of the team's 15 victories in 1911. He then attended Worcester Academy and Tufts University. While at Tufts in 1914 and 1915, he played summer baseball for the Falmouth Cottage Club in what is now the Cape Cod Baseball League. One of the top pitchers in the league, he threw a no-hitter for Falmouth against Oak Bluffs in 1915. Whittaker played a key role in what has been called the "greatest college baseball battle ever waged," a 1916 championship game between collegiate baseball powerhouses Tufts and Harvard. Whittaker received his Doctor of Dental Medicine degree in June 1916 from the Tufts University School of Dental Medicine along with his batterymate Doc Carroll.

Whittaker's only major league appearance came for Baseball Hall of Fame manager Connie Mack's historically poor-performing 1916 Philadelphia club. Whittaker tossed the final two innings for the Athletics on July 6 at Shibe Park in Philadelphia's 9-4 loss to the Detroit Tigers, whose lineup featured Hall of Famer Ty Cobb. He declined a reassignment to the minors and chose instead to begin practicing dentistry.

He died in 1965.
