= Robert Bonner =

Robert Bonner may refer to:

- Robert C. Bonner (born 1942), American lawyer and government official
- Robert E. Bonner (1824–1899), American newspaper editor
- Robert Bonner (baseball) (1894–?), American baseball player
- Robert Bonner (politician) (1920–2005), Canadian politician and corporate executive
- Bobby Bonner (Robert Averill Bonner, born 1956), baseball player
