= Mike Murphy (baseball) =

American baseball player (1888–1952)

- Catcher
- Born: August 19, 1888; Forestville, Pennsylvania, U.S.
- Died: October 26, 1952 (aged 64); Johnson City, New York, U.S.
- Batted: Right Threw: Right

MLB debut
- May 17, 1912, for the St. Louis Cardinals

Last MLB appearance
- July 11, 1916, for the Philadelphia Athletics

MLB statistics
- Batting average: .107
- Home runs: 0
- Runs batted in: 2
- Stats at Baseball Reference

Teams
- St. Louis Cardinals (1912); Philadelphia Athletics (1916)

Michael Jerome Murphy (August 19, 1888 – October 26, 1952) was an American Major League Baseball catcher. He played for the St. Louis Cardinals during the 1912 season and the Philadelphia Athletics during the 1916 season.
