= Jack Richardson (baseball) =

American baseball player (1892-1970)

- Pitcher
- Born: October 3, 1892; Central City, Illinois, U.S.
- Died: January 18, 1970 (aged 77); Marion, Illinois, U.S.
- Batted: Both Threw: Right

MLB debut
- September 17, 1915, for the Philadelphia Athletics

Last MLB appearance
- April 13, 1916, for the Philadelphia Athletics

MLB statistics
- Win–loss record: 0-1
- Earned run average: 3.65
- Strikeouts: 12
- Stats at Baseball Reference

Teams
- Philadelphia Athletics (1915–1916)

John William Richardson (October 3, 1892 – January 18, 1970) was an American Major League Baseball pitcher who played in 1915 and 1916 with the Philadelphia Athletics.
