= Rydal, Pennsylvania =

Unincorporated community in Pennsylvania, US

- Unincorporated community
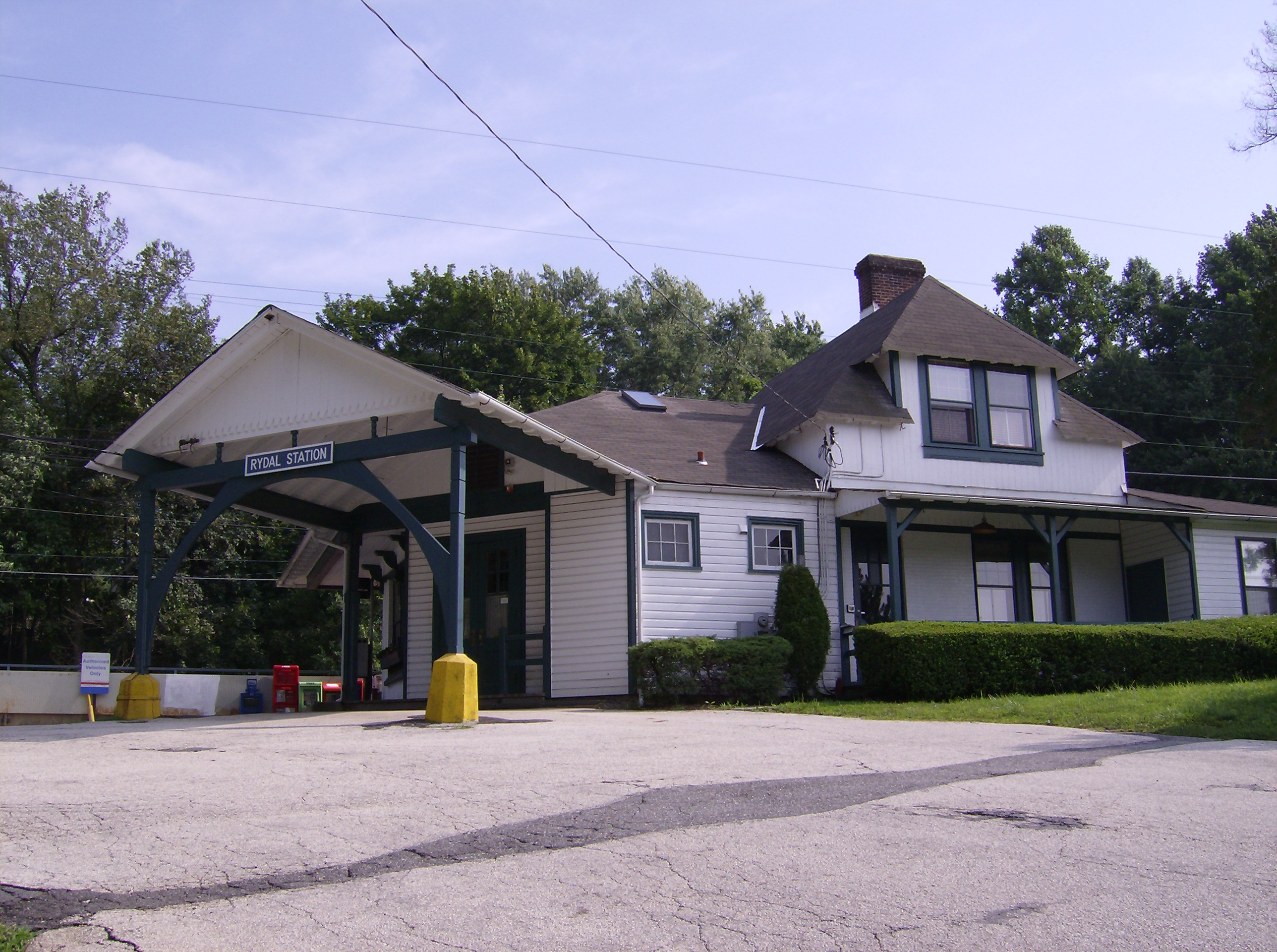
- Rydal Station, designed by architect Frank Furness

- Location of Rydal in Pennsylvania
- Coordinates: 40°06′23″N 75°06′31″W
- Country: United States
- State: Pennsylvania
- County: Montgomery
- Township: Abington
- Established: 1891
- Elevation: 223 ft (68 m)
- Time zone: UTC-5 (EST)
  - Summer (DST): UTC-4 (EDT)
- ZIP code: 19046
- Area codes: 215, 267 and 445
- Website: rydal.com

Rydal is an unincorporated community in Abington Township, Montgomery County, Pennsylvania, United States. Rydal is predominantly residential, except for one large shopping area. The Abington campus of Penn State is located in Rydal. The Rydal train station was a stop on the Reading Railroad line, beginning in the late 19th century, and now is part of the SEPTA Regional Rail system on the West Trenton Line.

Old York Road Historical Society (OYRHS) maintains an archive of the history of the area. It reported that the Rydal Train Station was originally called "Benezet." However, the station and the area were renamed after Rydal and Keswick in the United Kingdom.

== Notable people ==
- Bradley Cooper – Actor and Germantown Academy alumnus; grew up in Rydal
- George Hesselbacher – Former Major League baseball player; died in Rydal
- Philip Edgcumbe Hughes – Anglican theologian; lived in Rydal in his later years
- Larry Kane – Noted journalist and television anchor; lives in Rydal
- Katalin Karikó – Hungarian, Nobel Laureate biochemist and BioNTech senior vice president; lives in Rydal
- Allyson Schwartz – Former U.S. Representative and gubernatorial candidate; lives in Rydal
- Josh Shapiro – Pennsylvania Governor and former Attorney General; lives in Rydal

== Government ==
Rydal is represented in local government by Abington Ward 1 Commissioner Dr. Thomas Hecker, Ward 3 Commissioner Drew Rothman, and Ward 7 Commissioner Stuart Winegrad.

Rydal is in the Fourth Congressional District and is represented by Rep. Madeleine Dean.

Rydal falls within the 4th Senatorial District in the Pennsylvania Senate and is Represented by Art Haywood.

Rydal falls within the 153rd Legislative District in the PA House of Representatives and is represented by Ben Sanchez.

Rydal-Meadowbrook Civic Association serves this neighborhood by hosting candidate forums at the township, county, state and federal levels.
