= Marsh Williams =

American baseball player (1893–1935)

- Pitcher
- Born: February 21, 1893; Faison, North Carolina, US
- Died: February 22, 1935 (aged 42); Tucson, Arizona, US
- Batted: Right Threw: Right

MLB debut
- July 7, 1916, for the Philadelphia Athletics

Last MLB appearance
- August 25, 1916, for the Philadelphia Athletics

MLB statistics
- Win–loss record: 0–6
- Earned run average: 7.89
- Strikeouts: 17
- Stats at Baseball Reference

Teams
- Philadelphia Athletics (1916)

Marshall McDiarmid Williams (February 21, 1893 – February 22, 1935) nicknamed "Cap", was a pitcher in Major League Baseball. He played for the Philadelphia Athletics in 1916.

The following year, on March 22, 1917, Marshall enlisted in the U.S. Army and served in France during WWI as regimental commander, supply officer, and battalion commander of the 48th Coast Artillery, and in command of the Clisson billeting area.
