= Clint Blume =

American baseball player (1898-1973)

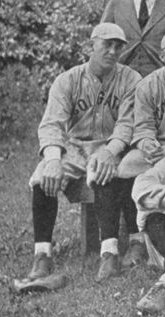
- Yearbook photo, 1922
- Pitcher
- Born: October 17, 1898; Brooklyn, New York, U.S.
- Died: June 12, 1973 (aged 74); Islip, New York, U.S.
- Batted: Right Threw: Right

MLB debut
- September 30, 1922, for the New York Giants

Last MLB appearance
- July 13, 1923, for the New York Giants

MLB statistics
- Win–loss record: 3–0
- Earned run average: 3.00
- Strikeouts: 4
- Stats at Baseball Reference

Teams
- New York Giants (1922–1923)

Clinton Willis Blume (October 17, 1898 – June 12, 1973) was an American Major League Baseball (MLB) pitcher for the New York Giants for two seasons and was a member of the 1922 world champions under John McGraw.

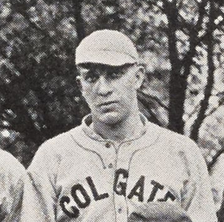
1921 Colgate University yearbook photo

Making his debut aged 23 when he was signed as a free agent in 1922, Blume was a right-handed batter and a right-handed thrower. He was 5 feet 11 inches (1.80 m) tall and weighed 175 pounds (79 kg). While at Colgate University (Class of '22), he was inducted into Delta Kappa Epsilon, and was also named to the All-American baseball team in 1921.

He entered the real-estate field with a brother in 1926 and 10 years later formed his own company under his own name.

He was a former governor and life member of the sales brokers committee of the board, a member of its arbitration unit and consultants committee and groups on ethics, commissions and professional practices, grievances and public relations. In 1954 he was named New York Real Estate Man of the Year.

He was known as "the broker's broker", and was president of the Real Estate Board of New York in 1954, 1955 and 1956.

Blume was the key figure in one of the largest assemblages in the history of New York real estate—the parcels that make up Rockefeller Center on the west side of the Avenue of the Americas from 48th Street to 51st Street. Among other major projects in which he was a consultant or a broker were the Prudential Plaza in Los Angeles, Ohrbach's Department Stores, the New York Produce Exchange and Cooper Union.

He was a member of a four-man committee named by former Mayor Robert F. Wagner Jr. to bring baseball back to New York. The others were William A. Shea, James A. Farley and Bernard Gimbel.

He received the New York City Medal for helping to preserve New York as a sports capital.

He was a trustee of the Lincoln Savings Bank and Long Island University from 1961 to 1969. His clubs included the Union League, Yale and St. George Golf and Country in Stony Brook, L.I.

He died in his sleep at his home on June 12, 1973, at 74 years old.
