= George Hesselbacher =

American baseball player (1895–1980)

- Pitcher
- Born: January 18, 1895; Philadelphia, Pennsylvania
- Died: February 18, 1980 (aged 85); Rydal, Pennsylvania
- Batted: Right Threw: Right

MLB debut
- June 29, 1916, for the Philadelphia Athletics

Last MLB appearance
- July 19, 1916, for the Philadelphia Athletics

MLB statistics
- Win–loss record: 0–4
- Earned run average: 7.27
- Strikeouts: 6
- Stats at Baseball Reference

Teams
- Philadelphia Athletics (1916)

George Edward Hesselbacher (January 18, 1895 – February 18, 1980) was a Major League Baseball pitcher who pitched for the Philadelphia Athletics. He was born on January 18, 1895, in Philadelphia, Pennsylvania. He was 6'2" tall and weighed 175 pounds. He threw and batted right-handed.

== Biography ==
After graduating from Penn State University, where he played college baseball for the Nittany Lions, Hesselbacher was given a trial by Connie Mack and the Athletics. He walked 22, struck out six and had an earned run average of 7.27. He played his final game on July 19, 1916. Before beginning a western road trip, the A's released Hesselbacher and outfielder Ralph Mitterling.

Hesselbacher served as a commanding officer in the United States Army during World War I.

On February 18, 1980, Hesselbacher died in Rydal, Pennsylvania and was buried in Northwood Cemetery in Philadelphia.
