= Thomas Healy (baseball) =

American baseball player

- Third baseman
- Born: October 30, 1895; Altoona, Pennsylvania, U.S.
- Died: January 15, 1974 (aged 78); Cleveland, Ohio, U.S.
- Batted: Right Threw: Right

MLB debut
- July 13, 1915, for the Philadelphia Athletics

Last MLB appearance
- October 3, 1916, for the Philadelphia Athletics

MLB statistics
- Batting average: .230
- Home runs: 0
- Runs batted in: 7
- Stats at Baseball Reference

Teams
- Philadelphia Athletics (1915–1916)

Thomas Fitzgerald Healy (October 30, 1895 – January 15, 1974) was an American Major League Baseball infielder. He played for the Philadelphia Athletics during the 1915 and 1916 seasons. He attended the University of Pittsburgh.
