= Central City, Illinois =

- Village
- Location in Marion County, Illinois
- Coordinates: 38°32′48″N 89°07′31″W
- Country: United States
- State: Illinois
- County: Marion
- Township: Centralia

Area
  - Total: 0.56 sq mi (1.46 km^{2})
  - Land: 0.56 sq mi (1.46 km^{2})
  - Water: 0 sq mi (0.00 km^{2})
- Elevation: 492 ft (150 m)

Population (2020)
  - Total: 1,098
  - Density: 1,943.4/sq mi (750.37/km^{2})
- Time zone: UTC-6 (CST)
  - Summer (DST): UTC-5 (CDT)
- ZIP code: 62801 (Centralia)
- Area code: 618
- FIPS code: 17-12151
- GNIS ID: 2397590
- Website: www.centralcityil.com

Central City is a village in Marion County, Illinois, United States. The population was 1,098 at the 2020 census.

== Geography ==
Central City is located in southwestern Marion County. It is bordered to the south by the city of Centralia. U.S. Route 51 passes through Central City as Broadway and Commercial Street, leading south into Centralia and north 5 miles (8 km) to Sandoval.

According to the U.S. Census Bureau, Central City has a total area of 0.57 square miles (1.48 km^{2}), all land. Crooked Creek, a west-flowing tributary of the Kaskaskia River, touches the northern edge of the village.

== Demographics ==
Historical population
Census	Pop.	Note	%±
1880	411		—
1890	304		−26.0%
1900	615		102.3%
1910	1,179		91.7%
1920	1,248		5.9%
1930	1,148		−8.0%
1940	1,562		36.1%
1950	1,231		−21.2%
1960	1,422		15.5%
1970	1,377		−3.2%
1980	1,505		9.3%
1990	1,390		−7.6%
2000	1,371		−1.4%
2010	1,172		−14.5%
2020	1,098		−6.3%
U.S. Decennial Census

=== 2020 census ===
As of the 2020 census, Central City had a population of 1,098. The median age was 36.8 years. 27.8% of residents were under the age of 18 and 14.8% of residents were 65 years of age or older. For every 100 females there were 95.4 males, and for every 100 females age 18 and over there were 87.9 males age 18 and over.

100.0% of residents lived in urban areas, while 0.0% lived in rural areas.

There were 446 households in Central City, of which 34.1% had children under the age of 18 living in them. Of all households, 37.7% were married-couple households, 21.5% were households with a male householder and no spouse or partner present, and 32.5% were households with a female householder and no spouse or partner present. About 30.5% of all households were made up of individuals and 13.4% had someone living alone who was 65 years of age or older.

There were 539 housing units, of which 17.3% were vacant. The homeowner vacancy rate was 3.6% and the rental vacancy rate was 16.9%.

Racial composition as of the 2020 census
Race	Number	Percent
White	985	89.7%
Black or African American	43	3.9%
American Indian and Alaska Native	2	0.2%
Asian	2	0.2%
Native Hawaiian and Other Pacific Islander	0	0.0%
Some other race	15	1.4%
Two or more races	51	4.6%
Hispanic or Latino (of any race)	22	2.0%

=== 2000 census ===
As of the 2000 census, there were 1,371 people, 550 households, and 371 families residing in the village. The population density was 2,365.5 inhabitants per square mile (913.3/km^{2}). There were 626 housing units at an average density of 1,080.1 per square mile (417.0/km^{2}). The racial makeup of the village was 94.97% White, 1.82% African American, 0.22% Native American, 0.22% Asian, 0.15% Pacific Islander, 0.58% from other races, and 2.04% from two or more races. Hispanic or Latino of any race were 2.48% of the population.

There were 550 households, out of which 34.5% had children under the age of 18 living with them, 46.9% were married couples living together, 16.0% had a female householder with no husband present, and 32.5% were non-families. 26.4% of all households were made up of individuals, and 12.2% had someone living alone who was 65 years of age or older. The average household size was 2.49 and the average family size was 3.02.

In the village, the population was spread out, with 28.5% under the age of 18, 9.7% from 18 to 24, 28.8% from 25 to 44, 19.0% from 45 to 64, and 13.9% who were 65 years of age or older. The median age was 34 years. For every 100 females, there were 94.2 males. For every 100 females age 18 and over, there were 88.1 males.

The median income for a household in the village was $31,136, and the median income for a family was $36,518. Males had a median income of $27,917 versus $22,500 for females. The per capita income for the village was $13,151. About 12.9% of families and 15.1% of the population were below the poverty line, including 19.3% of those under age 18 and 8.6% of those age 65 or over.

== Notable people ==
- Jack Richardson, pitcher for the Philadelphia Athletics; born in Central City
