= Mahlon Higbee =

American baseball player (1901–1968)

- Outfielder
- Born: August 16, 1901; Louisville, Kentucky, U.S.
- Died: April 7, 1968 (aged 66); Depauw, Indiana, U.S.
- Batted: Right Threw: Right

MLB debut
- September 27, 1922, for the New York Giants

Last MLB appearance
- October 1, 1922, for the New York Giants

MLB statistics
- Batting average: .400
- Home runs: 1
- Runs batted in: 5
- Stats at Baseball Reference

Teams
- New York Giants (1922)

Mahlon Jesse Higbee (August 16, 1901 – April 7, 1968) was an American professional baseball player. He played three games in Major League Baseball (MLB) as an outfielder for the 1922 New York Giants during the final week of the season.

== Biography ==
Higbee was born in 1901 in Louisville, Kentucky. His professional baseball career spanned 1922 to 1927, primarily in Minor League Baseball, where he played over 300 games (records of the era are incomplete). He began the 1922 season with the Hopkinsville Hoppers of the KITTY League, and dominated the Class D circuit, leading the league with a .385 batting average, 161 hits and 101 runs scored. The New York Giants purchased his contract in July for $2,500 ($48,086 in 2025), with plans for him to join the team after the minor-league season. The Giants went on to clinched the National League pennant on September 25, and brought "Hy" Higbee to New York City.

With the Giants, Higbee did not disappoint, batting 4-for-10, with five runs batted in (RBIs) and two runs scored. All three of Higbee's games were played at the Polo Grounds as the second game of doubleheaders, and all were Giant victories. His five RBIs are the most for any major-league player who appeared in three games or fewer. Higbee hit the first, and only, home run of his major-league career in his final major-league at bat. In the field, he played left field and right field for a total of 25 innings, recording two putouts and no errors. Higbee did not play in the 1922 World Series, a victory in four games for the Giants over the New York Yankees, and was returned to the minor leagues.

Higbee played for the Denver Bears of the Class A Western League in 1923, then spent two seasons with the Portsmouth Truckers of the Class B Virginia League, batting .273 in 153 games. After not playing in 1926, Higbee returned in 1927 with the Evansville Hubs of the Three-I League, retiring after hitting just .188 in 16 games.

Higbee died in 1968 at the age of 66 in Depauw, Indiana. He was survived by his wife and two children.

== See also ==
- List of Major League Baseball players with a home run in their final major league at bat
