= Shag Thompson =

American baseball player (1893-1990)

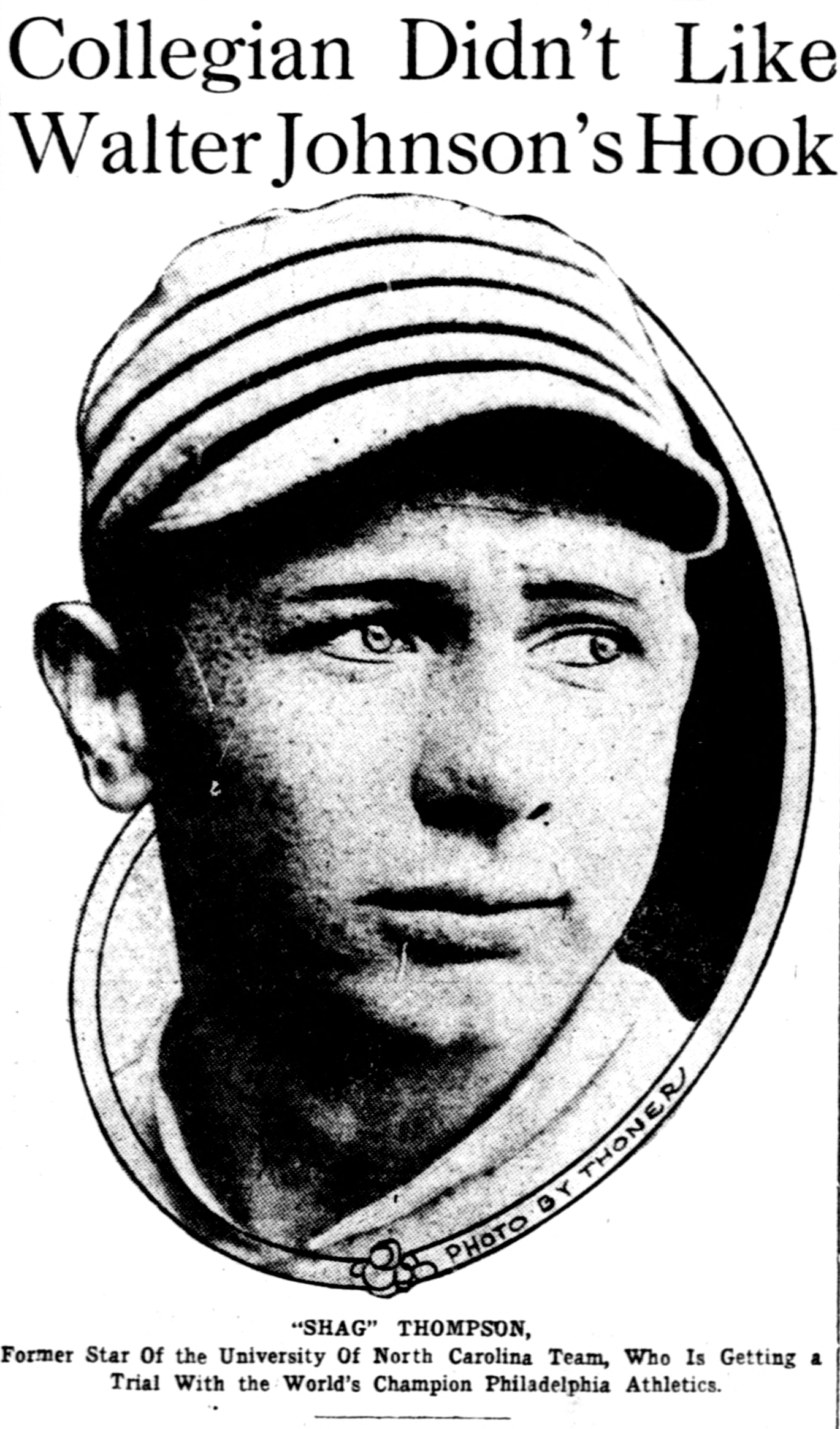
- Outfielder
- Born: April 29, 1893; Haw River, North Carolina, U.S.
- Died: January 7, 1990 (aged 96); Black Mountain, North Carolina, U.S.
- Batted: Left Threw: Right

MLB debut
- June 8, 1914, for the Philadelphia Athletics

Last MLB appearance
- May 17, 1916, for the Philadelphia Athletics

MLB statistics
- Batting average: .203
- Home runs: 0
- Runs batted in: 4
- Stats at Baseball Reference

Teams
- Philadelphia Athletics (1914–16)

James Alfred "Shag" Thompson (April 29, 1893 – January 7, 1990) was an American Major League Baseball (MLB) outfielder. He played parts of three seasons in the majors, from 1914 until 1916.He played mostly for the Philadelphia Athletics. An avid ball player he was, he also enjoyed the managerial aspect of the game. Later in life, he went on to be the General Manager and co-owner of The Somerset Patriots, a minor league ball club based in Somerset, New Jersey.

Thompson was expected to be a mainstay of the 1916 Philadelphia Athletics, but he was released after starting the season with no hits in 17 at-bats. Prior to his death in 1990, Thompson was the last living player to have played on the pitiful 1916 A's--a team often regarded as the worst MLB club of the 20th century.

He excelled in his coaching career and eventually started two youth baseball leagues in nearby Flemington, New Jersey. He then became involved in suburban development by purchasing large plots of farm land and constructing neighborhoods. Hedgerow Estates, Stanton Ridge, and Cushetunk are three of his many suburban developments he helped found.
