= Red Lanning =

American baseball player (1895-1962)

- Outfielder / Pitcher
- Born: April 13, 1895; Harvard, Illinois
- Died: June 13, 1962 (aged 67); Bristol, Connecticut
- Batted: Left Threw: Left

MLB debut
- June 20, 1916, for the Philadelphia Athletics

Last MLB appearance
- August 5, 1916, for the Philadelphia Athletics

MLB statistics
- Batting average: .182
- Home runs: 0
- Runs batted in: 1
- Earned run average: 8.14
- Stats at Baseball Reference

Teams
- Philadelphia Athletics (1916)

Lester Alfred "Red" Lanning (May 13, 1895 – June 13, 1962) was an American Major League Baseball pitcher and outfielder. He played for the Philadelphia Athletics during the 1916 season. Lanning attended Wesleyan University.
