= Harland Rowe =

American baseball player (1896–1969)

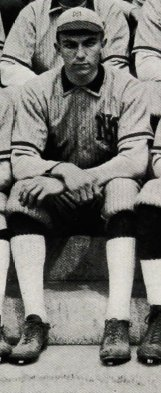
- Rowe with the 1915 University of Maine team
- Third baseman
- Born: April 20, 1896; Springvale, Maine
- Died: May 26, 1969 (aged 73); Springvale, Maine
- Batted: Left Threw: Right

MLB debut
- June 23, 1916, for the Philadelphia Athletics

Last MLB appearance
- September 27, 1916, for the Philadelphia Athletics

MLB statistics
- Batting average: .139
- Home runs: 0
- Runs batted in: 3
- Stats at Baseball Reference

Teams
- Philadelphia Athletics (1916)

Harland Stimson "Hypie" Rowe (April 20, 1896 – May 26, 1969), was an American professional baseball third baseman who played in 1916 with the Philadelphia Athletics of Major League Baseball. He batted left and threw right-handed. Rowe had a .139 batting average in 17 games, five hits in 36 at-bats, in his one year in the major leagues. He was born and died in Springvale, Maine.

He attended the University of Maine, where he played college baseball for the Black Bears from 1914–1916.
