= Grover Froese =

American baseball umpire (1916-1982)

- Born: Grover Alexander Froese; February 14, 1916; Staten Island, New York, U.S.
- Died: July 20, 1982 (aged 66); Bay Shore, New York, U.S.
- Resting place: Calverton National Cemetery
- Occupation: Umpire
- Years active: 1952-1953
- Employer: American League
- Spouse: Alyce M. Kenna

Grover Alexander "Moose" Froese (February 14, 1916 – July 20, 1982) was an American professional baseball umpire who worked in the American League during 1952 and 1953. He later worked as a baseball scout.

== Career ==
Froese umpired in the American League in 1952 and 1953. He also umpired in the Eastern League, International League, and the American Association. After his umpiring career, Froese served as a scout for the Philadelphia Phillies.

== Personal life ==
Froese served in the U.S. Army from 1942 to 1946.

== Death ==
Froese died in Bay Shore, New York in 1982.
