= Axel Lindstrom =

Swedish baseball player (1895-1940)

- Pitcher
- Born: August 26, 1895; Gustavsberg, Sweden
- Died: June 24, 1940 (aged 44); Asheville, North Carolina, U.S.
- Batted: Right Threw: Right

MLB debut
- October 3, 1916, for the Philadelphia Athletics

Last MLB appearance
- October 3, 1916, for the Philadelphia Athletics

MLB statistics
- Games pitched: 1
- Innings pitched: 4
- Earned run average: 4.50
- Stats at Baseball Reference

Teams
- Philadelphia Athletics (1916)

Axel Olaf Lindstrom (August 26, 1895 – June 24, 1940) was a pitcher for the 1916 Philadelphia Athletics. Lindstrom was born in Sweden in 1895 and died in North Carolina in 1940.

The 1916 Athletics had the worst winning percentage of any major league baseball team in the 20th century. Lindstrom made his lone appearance at the close of the season, pitching the last four innings on October 3. He allowed just two earned runs to get the save. This meant that Lindstrom actually ended the season tied for the team lead in saves, with one. (Two other pitchers also saved one game apiece for the 1916 A's.) In his only two big league at-bats, he went one-for-two, and singled home a run.

After his brief stint in the majors, Lindstrom played several seasons with Worcester in the Eastern League, and finished his career in the South Atlantic League.
