= Doc Carroll =

American baseball player (1891-1983)

- Catcher
- Born: December 28, 1891; Worcester, Massachusetts, U.S.
- Died: June 27, 1983 (aged 91); Worcester, Massachusetts, U.S.
- Batted: Right Threw: Right

MLB debut
- June 27, 1916, for the Philadelphia Athletics

Last MLB appearance
- July 26, 1916, for the Philadelphia Athletics

MLB statistics
- Batting average: .091
- Games: 10
- Hits: 2
- Stats at Baseball Reference

Teams
- Philadelphia Athletics (1916)

Ralph Arthur "Doc" Carroll (December 28, 1891 – June 27, 1983) was an American Major League Baseball catcher who played in 1916 with the Philadelphia Athletics. He batted and threw right-handed. Carroll had a .091 batting average in ten games, two hits in 22 at-bats, in his one-year career. Carroll graduated from Worcester Academy.

Carroll played college baseball for Holy Cross and Tufts before coaching at Worcester Polytechnic Institute.

He was born and died in Worcester, Massachusetts.
