= Jing Johnson =

American baseball player (1894-1950)

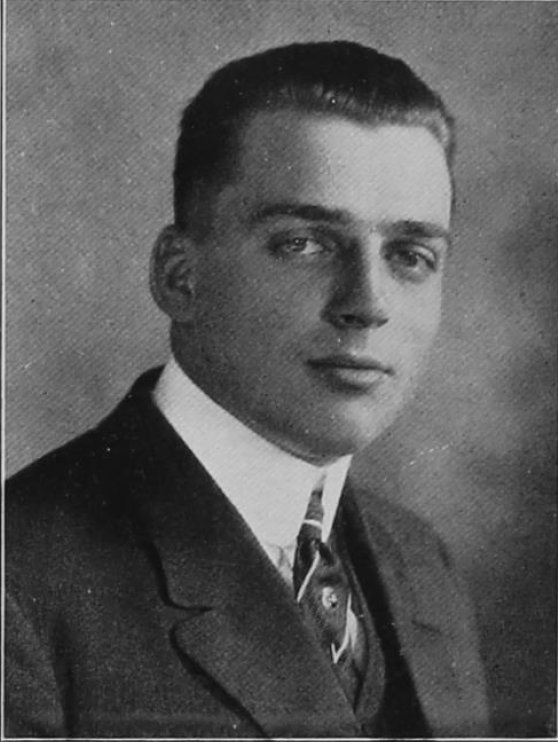
- Pitcher
- Born: October 9, 1894; Parker Ford, Pennsylvania, U.S.
- Died: December 6, 1950 (aged 56); Pottstown, Pennsylvania, U.S.
- Batted: Right Threw: Right

MLB debut
- June 27, 1916, for the Philadelphia Athletics

Last MLB appearance
- May 25, 1928, for the Philadelphia Athletics

MLB statistics
- Win–loss record: 24–37
- Earned run average: 3.35
- Strikeouts: 166
- Stats at Baseball Reference

Teams
- Philadelphia Athletics (1916–1917, 1919, 1927–1928)

Russell Conwell "Jing" Johnson (October 9, 1894 – December 6, 1950) was a pitcher during five seasons of American Major League Baseball. He played for the Philadelphia Athletics.

== Formative years and family ==
Born in Philadelphia, Pennsylvania on October 9, 1894, Johnson was a son of Harry W. Johnson and Alice (Shantz) Johnson and the brother of Milton and R. Wayne Johnson. A graduate of Ursinus College, he went on to study wireless telegraphy at the Franklin Institute in Philadelphia in 1918 before enlisting in the United States Navy during World War I. He was a resident of Parker Ford, Pennsylvania at the time of his enlistment. Jing Johnson subsequently married Mary Siez; they were the parents of one son, Donald Johnson.

== Career ==
A right-hander, Johnson played for the Philadelphia Athletics, during three separate stints over a period of five years, 1916–1917, 1919 and 1927–1928. The first gap was due to Johnson's World War I service, while the second, seven-year gap was precipitated by a salary dispute with Athletics owner Connie Mack. A chemist by training, Johnson held a significant financial interest in the Novelty Grease Co. in Mont Clare, Pennsylvania, and was reportedly considering focusing more on his business interests because he felt the salary Mack was offering was too low.

From 1920 to 1926, he played for independent teams in Baltimore, Maryland and the Virginia League (1920-1921) and in Shamokin (early 1920s), Allentown (1924-1926), and Hellertown, Pennsylvania (1923).

Following his pitching career, Johnson coached baseball for two years at Bucknell University and then at Lehigh University before serving as the athletic director and baseball coach at Ursinus College for eleven years.

He also became a popular speaker at civic organization and church banquets and other events, and became known for his storytelling skills.

== Death ==
On December 6, 1950, Johnson was involved in a two-car automobile collision at the intersection of Route 422 and Township Line Road between Trappe, Pennsylvania and Limerick Center (Limerick Township, Pennsylvania), a location which had become the site of multiple fatal accidents priot to the installation of a traffic light. Severely injured, he died within minutes and was pronounced dead at the scene. According to the Pottstown Mercury newspaper, "Johnson's body was taken to the Charles J. Franks funeral home, 21 Main street, Trappe." Reportedly "heard for more than half a mile," the collision was so hard that it forced "the front end of the ex-athlete's 1941 sedan ... almost back to the windshield" as it ejected Johnson from his vehicle. His body was found beneath the vehicle of the other driver, who survived, but was seriously injured. "Positive identification" of Johnson's body was made at the funeral home "from papers in his wallet." The Pennsylvania State Police later charged the driver of the other car with involuntary manslaughter.

A fifty-year-old resident of Collegeville at the time of his death, Johnson had been employed as a manager of the McCarraher Brothers store in Pottstown.

The Rev. Escol Sellers and the Rev. R. Earl Marcus, the pastor of the Parkerford Baptist Church, conducted the funeral services, which were held at Johnson's home in Collegeville on December 10, prior to his interment at the Parkerford Baptist Church Cemetery.
