= Ralph Mitterling =

American athlete and coach (1890–1956)

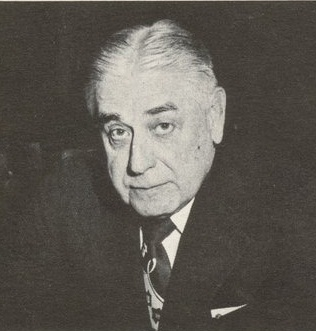
- Mitterling from The 1954 Owl

Biographical details
- Born: April 19, 1890; Freeburg, Pennsylvania, U.S.
- Died: January 22, 1956 (aged 65); Pittsburgh, Pennsylvania, U.S.

Playing career

Football
- 1911–1914: Ursinus
- 1915–1916: Springfield

Baseball
- 1916: Philadelphia Athletics
- Positions: Halfback (football); Outfielder

Coaching career (HC unless noted)

Football
- 1919–1920: Ursinus
- 1923: Susquehanna
- 1924: Schuylkill (assistant)
- 1926–1935: East Stroudsburg

Basketball
- 1919–1921: Ursinus

Baseball
- 1920–1921: Ursinus
- 1927–1936: East Stroudsburg
- 1939–1954: Pittsburgh

Administrative career (AD unless noted)
- 1919–1921: Ursinus

Head coaching record
- Overall: 47–52–7 (football); 17–28 (basketball); 173–155–2 (baseball)

Ralph Mitterling
- Outfielder
- Born: April 19, 1890; Freeburg, Pennsylvania
- Died: January 22, 1956 (aged 65); Pittsburgh, Pennsylvania
- Batted: Right Threw: Right

MLB debut
- July 7, 1916, for the Philadelphia Athletics

Last MLB appearance
- July 21, 1916, for the Philadelphia Athletics

MLB statistics
- Batting average: .154
- Home runs: 0
- Runs batted in: 2
- Stats at Baseball Reference

Teams
- Philadelphia Athletics (1916)

Ralph "Sarge" Mitterling (April 19, 1890 – January 22, 1956) was an American football, basketball, and baseball player and coach. He played Major League Baseball as an outfielder for the Philadelphia Athletics during the 1916 season. He served in the US Army during World War I. Mitterling was the head football coach at Ursinus College from 1919 to 1920, at Susquehanna University in 1923, and at East Stroudsburg State Teachers College—now East Stroudsburg University of Pennsylvania—from 1926 to 1935, compiling a career college football record of 47–52–7. He was also the head basketball coach at Ursinus from 1919 to 1921, tallying a mark of 17–28, and the head baseball coach at the University of Pittsburgh from 1939 to 1954, amassing a record of 89–106–1. Mitterling died on January 22, 1956, at Veteran's Hospital in the Oakland section of Pittsburgh, Pennsylvania.

== Head coaching record ==
=== Football ===
Year	Team	Overall	Conference	Standing	Bowl/playoffs
Ursinus (Independent) (1919–1920)
1919	Ursinus	2–7			
1920	Ursinus	3–6			
Ursinus:		5–13			
Susquehanna Crusaders (Independent) (1923)
1923	Susquehanna	3–6			
Susquehanna:		3–6			
East Stroudsburg Warriors (Independent) (1926–1933)
1926	East Stroudsburg	6–1–1			
1927	East Stroudsburg	6–1–1			
1928	East Stroudsburg	4–5			
1929	East Stroudsburg	3–4–1			
1930	East Stroudsburg	4–4			
1931	East Stroudsburg	3–2–2			
1932	East Stroudsburg	2–5–1			
1933	East Stroudsburg	4–4			
East Stroudsburg Warriors (Pennsylvania State Teachers Conference) (1934–1935)
1934	East Stroudsburg	4–2–1	2–1	4th	
1935	East Stroudsburg	3–5	1–2	9th	
East Stroudsburg:		39–33–7	3–3		
Total:		47–52–7			
