= Harry O'Donnell =

American baseball player (1894-1958)

- Catcher
- Born: April 2, 1894; Philadelphia, Pennsylvania, U.S.
- Died: January 31, 1958 (aged 63); Philadelphia, Pennsylvania, U.S.
- Batted: Right Threw: Right

MLB debut
- April 30, 1927, for the Philadelphia Phillies

Last MLB appearance
- September 30, 1927, for the Philadelphia Phillies

MLB statistics
- Games played: 16
- At bats: 16
- Hits: 1
- Stats at Baseball Reference

Teams
- Philadelphia Phillies (1927)

Harry Herman "Butch" O'Donnell (April 2, 1894 – January 31, 1958) was an American Major League Baseball catcher who played for the Philadelphia Phillies in 1927.
