= Tom Sheehan =

American baseball player, coach, and manager (1894–1982)

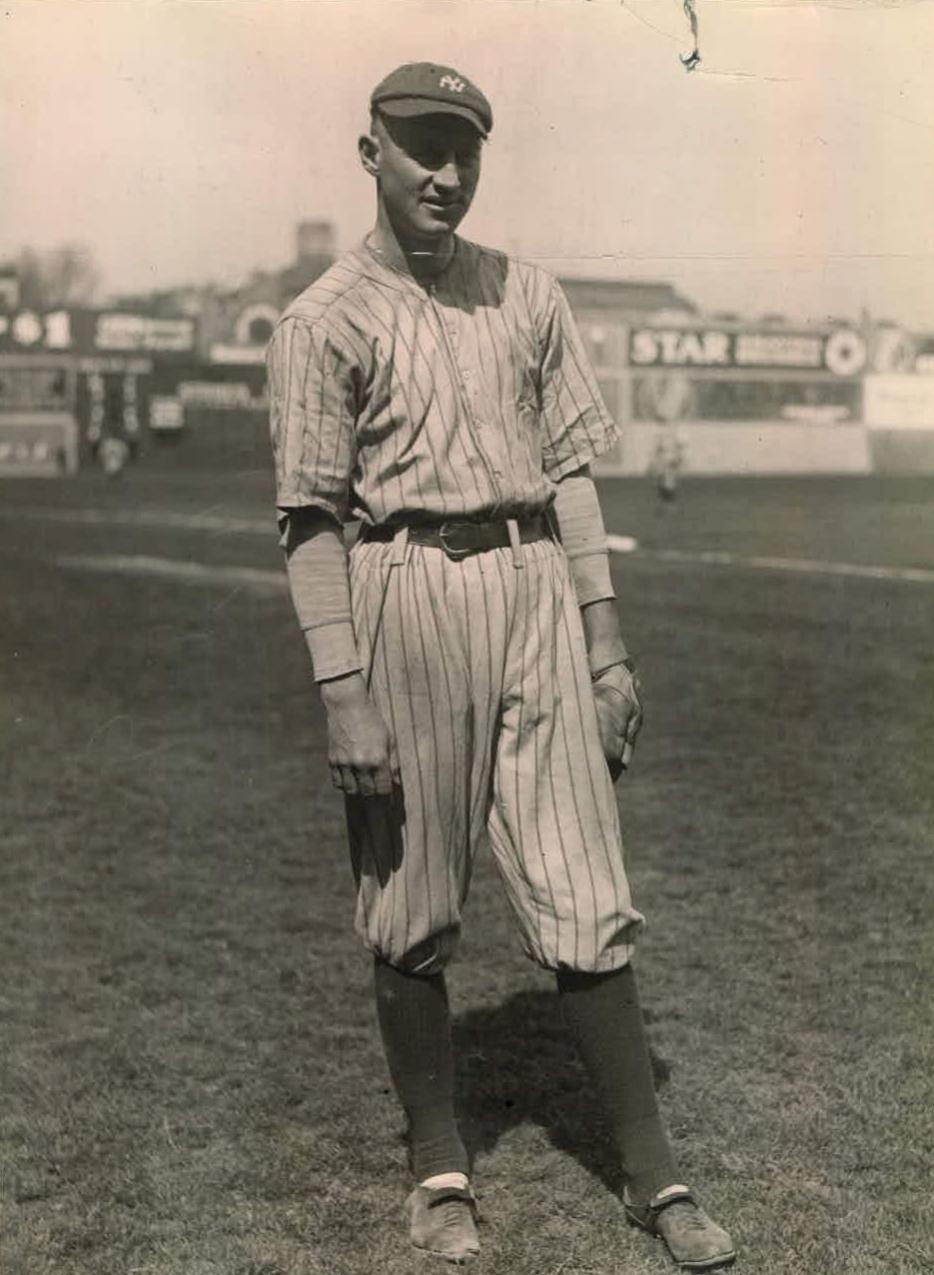
- Pitcher / Manager
- Born: March 31, 1894; Grand Ridge, Illinois, U.S.
- Died: October 29, 1982 (aged 88); Chillicothe, Ohio, U.S.
- Batted: Right Threw: Right

MLB debut
- July 14, 1915, for the Philadelphia Athletics

Last MLB appearance
- May 27, 1926, for the Pittsburgh Pirates

MLB statistics
- Win–loss record: 17–39
- Earned run average: 4.00
- Strikeouts: 169
- Stats at Baseball Reference

Teams
- As player: Philadelphia Athletics (1915–1916); New York Yankees (1921); Cincinnati Reds (1924–1925); Pittsburgh Pirates (1925–1926); As manager: San Francisco Giants (1960)

Thomas Clancy Sheehan (March 31, 1894 – October 29, 1982) was an American pitcher, scout, coach and manager in Major League Baseball.

Born in Grand Ridge, Illinois, Sheehan, a right-hander, had a six-year pitching career from 1915–16, 1921 and 1924–26, playing for the Philadelphia Athletics and New York Yankees of the American League and the Cincinnati Reds and Pittsburgh Pirates of the National League. He pitched for two of the worst teams in big league history — the 1915-16 Athletics. Manager and part-owner Connie Mack totally dismantled his 1914 AL-champion club after it was swept by the "Miracle" Boston Braves in the World Series. After Mack replaced his stars with inexperienced players, the A's of 1915–16 won a total of 79 games, while losing 226 — a winning percentage of only .259. At 21, Sheehan won four games and lost nine in 1915, but the following season he dropped 16 of 17 decisions (.059), although he compiled a decent earned run average of 3.69.

Overall, Sheehan appeared in 146 major league games, winning 17 and losing 39 (.304) with a 4.00 ERA.

Sheehan coached for the Reds (1935–37), Brooklyn Dodgers (1938) and Boston Braves (1944), and spent many years as a minor league manager and scout for the New York/San Francisco Giants. On June 19, 1960, at age 66, he succeeded the fired Bill Rigney as pilot of the Giants. Sheehan became the oldest person to make his debut as a big-league manager. The move was a shocker, and it backfired. Rigney's Giants had won 33 of 58 games and were in second place in the National League; but under Sheehan, San Francisco won 46, lost 50 (.479) and fell to a second-division, fifth-place finish.

Willie Mays thought the problem was that Sheehan was merely a fill-in while owner Horace Stoneham tried to pick a permanent replacement for Rigney. "I felt kind of sorry for him," Mays said. "We both knew that he was only a temporary fill-in, and that's a tough spot to get anything done. He was in uniform in body only. He didn't offer us any inspiration." Sheehan resumed his scouting duties at season's end as the Giants hired former player Alvin Dark to manage. He died in Chillicothe, Ohio at the age of 88.
