= Rube Parnham =

American baseball player

- Pitcher
- Born: February 1, 1894; Heidelberg, Pennsylvania, U.S.
- Died: November 25, 1963 (aged 69); McKeesport, Pennsylvania, U.S.
- Batted: Right Threw: Right

MLB debut
- September 20, 1916, for the Philadelphia Athletics

Last MLB appearance
- September 24, 1917, for the Philadelphia Athletics

MLB statistics
- Win–loss record: 2–2
- Strikeouts: 12
- Earned run average: 4.04
- Stats at Baseball Reference

Teams
- Philadelphia Athletics (1916–1917)

James Arthur "Rube" Parnham (February 1, 1894 – November 25, 1963) was an American Major League Baseball pitcher for the 1916 and 1917 Philadelphia Athletics.

Parnham started only five games for the Athletics, completing two of them. His career record in the majors was 2–2. However, he was acquired by the International League's Baltimore Orioles during the 1917 season, and over the next 10 seasons, he would compile a 139–60 record for Jack Dunn's ballclub.

1919 was Rube's breakout year. He led the league in wins (28) and strikeouts (187), as the Orioles dynasty won their first pennant. After starting out 5–0 in 1920, Parnham quit the team in 1920 to pitch in a Pennsylvania industrial league. He rejoined in the middle of the 1922 season.

In 1923, he had another outstanding performance, going 33–7 with 28 complete games. He managed to outshine even future Hall of Famer Lefty Grove, who was on the same team. The 33 wins are a 20th-century International League record and Baltimore won another pennant.

Ever unpredictable, Parnham quit the team again the following season and pitched his last professional game in 1927. He was later described as the "dumbest man off the field – and the smartest on."

In 1957, Parnham was elected to the International League Hall of Fame. He died in 1963, and is buried at Mount Vernon Cemetery in McKeesport, Pennsylvania.
