= Moxie Divis =

American baseball player (1894-1955)

- Outfielder
- Born: January 16, 1894; Cleveland, Ohio
- Died: December 19, 1955 (aged 61); Lakewood, Ohio
- Batted: Unknown Threw: Unknown

MLB debut
- August 4, 1916, for the Philadelphia Athletics

Last MLB appearance
- August 6, 1916, for the Philadelphia Athletics

MLB statistics
- Batting average: .167
- Home runs: 0
- Runs batted in: 1
- Stats at Baseball Reference

Teams
- Philadelphia Athletics (1916)

Edward George "Moxie" Divis (January 16, 1894 – December 19, 1955) was an American Major League Baseball outfielder. He played for the Philadelphia Athletics during the 1916 season.
