= Fred Johnson (baseball) =

American baseball player (1894-1973)

- Pitcher
- Born: March 10, 1894; Tolar, Texas, U.S.
- Died: June 14, 1973 (aged 79); Kerrville, Texas, U.S.
- Batted: Right Threw: Right

MLB debut
- September 27, 1922, for the New York Giants

Last MLB appearance
- May 10, 1939, for the St. Louis Browns

MLB statistics
- Win–loss record: 5–10
- Strikeouts: 39
- Earned run average: 5.26
- Stats at Baseball Reference

Teams
- New York Giants (1922–23); St. Louis Browns (1938–39)

Frederick Edward Johnson (March 10, 1894 - June 14, 1973) was an American Major League Baseball player who played for the New York Giants and the St. Louis Browns. He debuted in 1922 on September 27 with the Giants. After the 1923 season he didn't appear again in the major leagues until 1938 when he pitched for the Browns. The fifteen year gap between pitching wins remains a major league record. (Paul Schreiber, who never won a major league game, holds the record for longest gap between appearances at 22 years.)

Johnson's final pitch was thrown the next year at the age of 45, making him one of the oldest pitchers to have ever appeared in a major league game. Throughout his career he walked more batters than he struck out.

== Sources ==
- Career statistics from Baseball Reference · Retrosheet · Baseball Almanac
