= Sam Crane (shortstop) =

American baseball player (1894–1955)

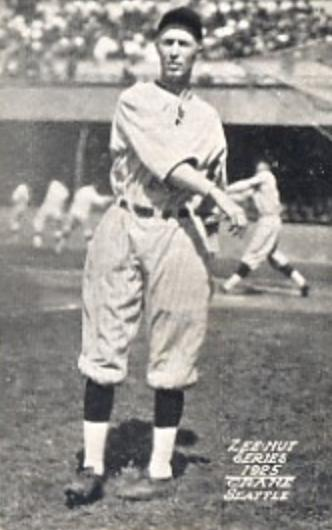
- Shortstop
- Born: September 13, 1894; Harrisburg, Pennsylvania, U.S.
- Died: November 12, 1955 (aged 61); Philadelphia, Pennsylvania, U.S.
- Batted: Right Threw: Right

MLB debut
- October 2, 1914, for the Philadelphia Athletics

Last MLB appearance
- April 23, 1922, for the Brooklyn Robins

MLB statistics
- Batting average: .208
- Home runs: 0
- Runs batted in: 30
- Stats at Baseball Reference

Teams
- Philadelphia Athletics (1914–1916); Washington Senators (1917); Cincinnati Reds (1920–1921); Brooklyn Robins (1922)

Samuel Byrem Crane (September 13, 1894 – November 12, 1955) was an American professional baseball player who played shortstop from 1914 to 1922.

Crane was convicted of the murder of his girlfriend Della Lyter and her boyfriend John Oren in the spring of 1930 and sentenced to 18–36 years in prison. His former manager Connie Mack eventually arranged for his parole in 1944.
