= Scoops Carey (baseball) =

American baseball player (1870–1916)

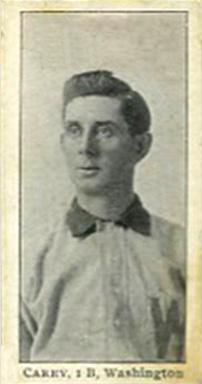
- First baseman
- Born: December 4, 1870; Pittsburgh, Pennsylvania, U.S.
- Died: December 17, 1916 (aged 46); East Liverpool, Ohio, U.S.
- Batted: Right Threw: Right

MLB debut
- April 26, 1895, for the Baltimore Orioles

Last MLB appearance
- July 6, 1903, for the Washington Senators

MLB statistics
- Batting average: .271
- Home runs: 1
- Runs batted in: 159
- Stats at Baseball Reference

Teams
- Baltimore Orioles (1895); Louisville Colonels (1898); Washington Senators (1902–1903)

George C. "Scoops" Carey (December 4, 1870 – December 17, 1916) was an American Major League Baseball first baseman for four seasons between 1895 and 1903. He played for the Baltimore Orioles, Louisville Colonels, and Washington Senators. His best season came in 1902, when he finished with 35 doubles, 11 triples and a league-leading fielding percentage. After his MLB career, Carey played in the minor leagues and managed there for one season. After his baseball days, he lived in East Liverpool, Ohio, where he died at the age of 46.

== Biography ==
Carey was born in Pittsburgh, Pennsylvania. He attended West Virginia University and started his professional baseball career in 1892. He came into prominence that year playing first base for the Altoona Mountaineers in the Pennsylvania State League. He soon earned a reputation as a good-fielding first baseman. After a few years in the minors, he made his major league debut with the Orioles in 1895, replacing future Hall of Famer Dan Brouthers. Carey led all National League first basemen in fielding percentage, and Baltimore won the pennant. He set his major league career highs in home runs (with 1) and runs batted in (75). However, Carey's OPS+ was just 62, and the following April he was sold to the Eastern League's Syracuse Stars.

He was a popular player in Syracuse and was the only player to ever hit the ball over the center field fence at the old Star Park. A Syracuse sports writer later described Carey's shot as follows: "He gave the ball such a terrific smash one day that it went over the center field fence like a scared projectile from a ten-inch gun. Had it not been for the attraction of gravitation it would never have come to earth again." In 1897, Carey had a good year in the Atlantic League, batting .354 to finish fourth in the circuit. He got another shot in the majors in 1898 with Louisville. In eight games, he hit just .188 and was sent down to the minors again. In 1901, he rebounded with a .316 batting average to earn his final shot in Major League Baseball, this time with the American League's Senators.

Carey played one and a half seasons with Washington. 1902 was the best season of his career. He hit .314 with 35 doubles and 11 triples and achieved an OPS+ of 117. For the second time, he led a major league in fielding percentage for first basemen. Carey started 1903 in the Washington starting lineup again; however, he struggled at the plate and played his final major league game on July 6. Carey is the only player in MLB history to lead two different leagues in fielding percentage in a two-season career. For the next eight years, Carey bounced around the minor leagues. He never batted .300 again. In 1910, he managed the Class D Jonesboro Zebras and then retired the following season.

After his baseball career ended, Carey became a painter and lived in East Liverpool, Ohio. He was converted by the evangelist Billy Sunday. He died at the age of 46 from mitral stenosis and mitral regurgitation, which one newspaper described as "leakage of the heart."
