= Leo Dixon =

American baseball player (1894–1984)

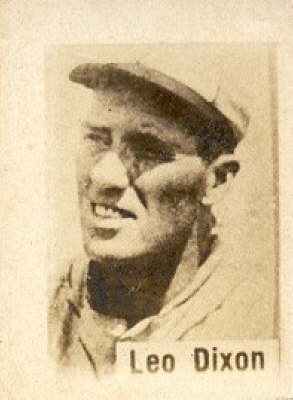
- Catcher
- Born: September 4, 1894; Chicago, Illinois, U.S.
- Died: April 11, 1984 (aged 89); Chicago, Illinois, U.S.
- Batted: Right Threw: Right

MLB debut
- April 14, 1925, for the St. Louis Browns

Last MLB appearance
- August 17, 1929, for the Cincinnati Reds

MLB statistics
- Batting average: .206
- Home runs: 1
- Runs batted in: 41
- Stats at Baseball Reference

Teams
- St. Louis Browns (1925–1927); Cincinnati Reds (1929)

Leo Moses Dixon (September 4, 1894 – April 11, 1984) was an American professional baseball player. His playing career as a catcher spanned 10 seasons, including four in Major League Baseball. Over his major league career, he played with the St. Louis Browns (1925–27) and the Cincinnati Reds (1929). Dixon was known as a light-hitting, defensive specialist.

== Professional career ==
=== Early career ===
Born in Chicago, Dixon began his professional baseball career in 1920 at the age of 25 with the Moline Plowboys of the Three-I League. His strong throwing arm attracted the attention of Jack Hendricks, then the manager of the Indianapolis Indians of the American Association. Dixon spent three seasons with Indianapolis, but saw little playing time, so at the end of the 1923 season, he asked for the club to release him. All the teams in the league passed on making an offer for his services except for the St. Paul Saints. Given a chance to play every day with the Saints in 1924, Dixon posted a .272 batting average with 10 home runs in 149 games. His solid defensive abilities as a catcher helped the Saints win the 1924 American Association pennant.

=== St. Louis Browns ===
Dixon's performance earned him a promotion to the major leagues when on January 4, 1925, the Saints traded him to the St. Louis Browns in exchange for Norm McMillan, Pat Collins, Ray Kolp and US$35,000 ($642,552 in today's standards). Browns manager, George Sisler said that he would be the team's starting catcher. Dixon did not sign a contract with the Browns before spring training and as a consequence, news reports dubbed him a "holdout". On March 13, it was announced that he had "wired for transportation", meaning that he was reporting to spring training with the Browns.

Dixon made his major league debut on April 14, 1925, at the age of 30. In his first season in the majors, Dixon batted .224 with 27 runs, 46 hits, 11 doubles, one triple, one home run and 19 RBIs in 76 games while sharing catching duties with Pinky Hargrave. During 1926 spring training, The Evening Independent noted that Dixon was regarded as "one of the smartest receivers in the American League". He was also cited along with future Hall of Fame member, Mickey Cochrane, as one of the best young catchers in major league baseball. In February 1926, the Browns acquired veteran catcher Wally Schang who would take over as their starting catcher, while Dixon took a role as a backup catcher. He spent his last season with the Browns in 1927, once again backing up Schang. On the season, Dixon batted .194 with six runs, 20 hits, three doubles, one triple and 12 RBIs in 36 games.

=== Later career ===
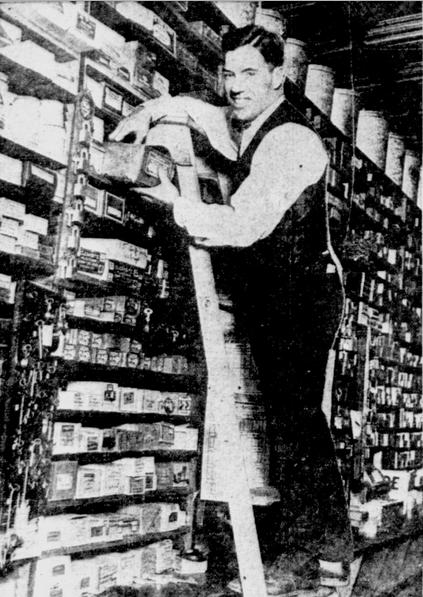
Leo Dixon pictured working at his father's hardware store.

The Browns traded Dixon to the Double-A Baltimore Orioles in 1928. With the Orioles, he hit for a .268 average with 79 hits, 12 doubles, three triples and three home runs in 102 games. Dixon was then selected by the Cincinnati Reds from the Orioles in the 1928 Rule 5 draft. He was reunited with his former manager, Jack Hendricks, who was then the manager for the Reds. On March 25, 1929, Hendricks announced that he intended to keep Dixon on the 25-man roster going into the season. He served as the third-string catcher behind Johnny Gooch and Clyde Sukeforth during the season. Dixon only managed a .167 batting average with five hits, two doubles and two runs batted in. He played in his final major league game on August 17, 1929.

The Reds released Dixon to the Double-A Columbus Senators in 1930. With the Senators that season, Dixon batted .251 with 73 hits, 11 doubles and four triples in 100 games. In 1931, Dixon attended spring training with the St. Louis Cardinals, but did not make the final roster. At the age of 37, he was signed by the Pittsburgh Pirates in May 1932, however, he did not make an appearance with the team.

== Career statistics ==
In a four-year major league career, Dixon played in 159 games, accumulating 88 hits in 427 at bats for a .206 career batting average, along with 1 home run, 41 runs batted in and an on-base percentage of .291. He had a career fielding percentage of .971. Dixon's strong throwing arm was made evident in 1927, when he led American League catchers with a baserunners caught stealing percentage of 51.4%. Over his minor league career, Dixon batted .245 with 427 hits, 72 doubles, 21 triples and 14 home runs in 572 games. Dixon played as a catcher in all of his 157 career major league games.

Because of Dixon's low batting average, which hovered just over .200, his name (along with Jim Mason's) was proposed for inclusion in a new term for poor hitting called the "Mason-Dixon Line" (.204), which is closer to .200 than the Mendoza Line (.215).

== Later life ==
Dixon worked as a clerk in his father's hardware store during the off-season. He died on April 11, 1984 at the age of 89 in Chicago, Illinois. Dixon was buried at Holy Sepulchre Catholic Cemetery in Worth, Illinois.
