= Twink Twining =

American baseball player (1894–1973)

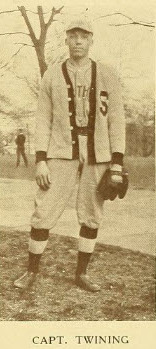
- Captain of the baseball team at Swarthmore College, c. 1916
- Pitcher
- Born: May 30, 1894; Horsham, Pennsylvania, U.S.
- Died: June 14, 1973 (aged 79); Lansdale, Pennsylvania, U.S.
- Batted: Right Threw: Right

MLB debut
- July 9, 1916, for the Cincinnati Reds

Last MLB appearance
- July 9, 1916, for the Cincinnati Reds

MLB statistics
- Games played: 1
- Earned run average: 13.50
- Innings pitched: 2.0
- Stats at Baseball Reference

Teams
- Cincinnati Reds (1916)

Howard Earle "Twink" Twining (May 30, 1894 – June 14, 1973) was an American professional baseball pitcher who played one game in Major League Baseball (MLB) for the Cincinnati Reds. He played baseball and basketball at Swarthmore College and later became a prominent dermatologist.

== Early life ==
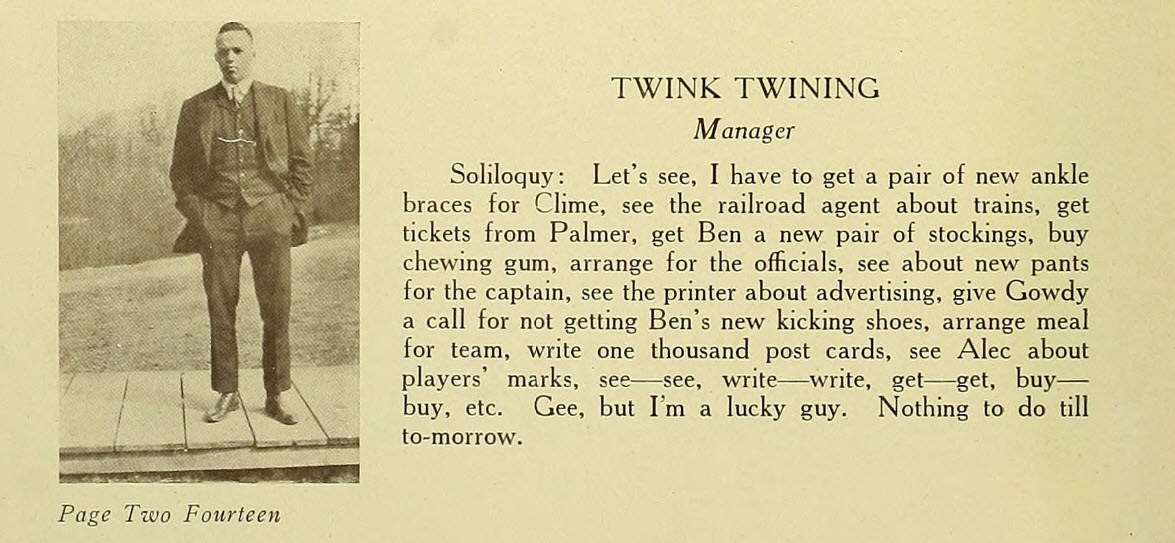
1916 yearbook vignette with "Twink" as manager of the football team

Howard Earle Twining was born on May 30, 1894, in Horsham, Pennsylvania. He attended Swarthmore College in Swarthmore, Pennsylvania, and became a "well-known" athlete in the area while playing baseball and basketball. He initially played second base at Swarthmore but then switched to pitcher and became a "star". He led the baseball team to wins over Penn and Michigan in three days in 1914; the win over Penn was the first time they ever accomplished it in school history. In basketball, he served as team captain, and Twining was also the manager of the football team.

Twining led the baseball team to several more victories against Penn in the 1915 season and also led the basketball team to wins over schools such as Army and Rutgers. The Evening Public Ledger described him as one of the three best pitchers in college baseball. Nicknamed "Twink" and "Twig", he threw right and batted right-handed.

== Professional baseball career ==
After having graduated from Swarthmore in 1915, Twining began his professional baseball career with a team in Chester, Pennsylvania. He also played for a team in Media, Pennsylvania, that year and for the Salisbury team of the independent Peninsula League. With Salisbury, he was the starting pitcher in an exhibition win over the Connie Mack-led Philadelphia Athletics.

In June 1916, Twining was signed by Buck Herzog, manager of the Cincinnati Reds of Major League Baseball, after having been told about Twining by a scout. He did not make his debut until over a month after signing with the team, being the closing pitcher in a 10–3 loss to the Brooklyn Robins. The Cincinnati Post noted that the game "was a nightmare for Red fans" and reported that Twining "had nothing with which to deceive the [Robins] ... He displayed a nice pitching motion but the Dodgers had no trouble hitting his offerings." He pitched two innings of the game and had an earned run average of 13.50, facing 11 batters while allowing three runs. He was released by the Reds several days later, with The Pittsburgh Press reported that he had "been with the Reds for over a month without having the slightest chance to make good or to start a game."

After being released by Cincinnati, Twining later spent time in 1916 with a team called "Carney's Point" in Delaware. He played for the Upland team of Upland, Pennsylvania, in 1917. The following year, he was a member of the Sun team in the Delaware River Shipbuilding League and also saw action with the "Chester Ship club". He played for the Wilkinsburg Murdocks in 1920, and for Glenside of the Philadelphia Suburban League from 1921 to 1922, helping them win two league championships.

== Later life and death ==
Twining attended Hahnemann Medical School and graduated with a Doctor of Medicine degree in 1919. He received dermatology training in Vienna and became a prominent dermatologist in Pennsylvania. He wrote articles published in medical journals, headed the Hahnemann Medical School department of dermatology and was president of the Philadelphia Dermatological Society. He was a member of the Pennsylvania Academy of Dermatology and served at various hospitals, including in Abington, Hahnemann and Wilmington, and at the Skin and Cancer, Philadelphia General and Naval Hospitals. He was a 32nd degree mason. He died on June 14, 1973, at the age of 78, from a long illness.
