= Cecil Kaiser =

- Pitcher / Outfielder / First baseman
- Born: June 27, 1916; New York City, New York, U. S.
- Died: February 14, 2011 (aged 94); Southfield, Michigan, U. S.
- Threw: Left

Teams
- Detroit Stars; Motor City Stars; Homestead Grays (1947); Pittsburgh Crawfords

Cecil Kaiser (June 27, 1916 – February 14, 2011) was an American Negro league baseball pitcher, outfielder, and first baseman.

In the course of his career Kaiser played for the Detroit Stars, the Motor City Giants, the Homestead Grays and Pittsburgh Crawfords and on various Latin American and Canadian teams. With the Homestead Grays he played with great players such as hall of famers Josh Gibson and Cool Papa Bell.

He started his career as a 5-foot-6, 165-pound outfielder. He eventually became a left-handed pitcher after his team suffered a series of injuries. He was known as a strikeout pitcher with a good fastball and an assortment of off-speed pitches. He was nicknamed the "Minute Man" as it took him about one minute to strike out batters and as the "Aspirin Tablet Man" for throwing pitches that resembled aspirin tablets. During perhaps his best season, the winter ball season of 1949-1950, he posted a league-leading 1.68 ERA in the Puerto Rican League.

Kaiser died after a fall at his home in Southfield, Michigan.
