= Lee McElwee =

American baseball player (1894-1957)

- Third baseman
- Born: May 23, 1894; La Mesa, California, U.S.
- Died: February 8, 1957 (aged 62); Union, Maine, U.S.
- Batted: Right Threw: Right

MLB debut
- July 3, 1916, for the Philadelphia Athletics

Last MLB appearance
- September 28, 1916, for the Philadelphia Athletics

MLB statistics
- Batting average: .265
- Home runs: 0
- Runs batted in: 10
- Stats at Baseball Reference

Teams
- Philadelphia Athletics (1916)

Leland Stanford McElwee (May 23, 1894 – February 8, 1957) was an American professional baseball player. He played in Major League Baseball for the Philadelphia Athletics during the 1916 season, primarily as a third baseman.
