= Robert Bonner (baseball) =

American baseball player (born 1894)

- First baseman / Catcher / Second baseman
- Born: April 1, 1894; Fayetteville, Tennessee, U.S.
- Batted: Right Threw: Right

Negro league baseball debut
- 1921, for the Cleveland Tate Stars

Last appearance
- 1926, for the Cleveland Elites
- Stats at Baseball Reference

Teams
- Cleveland Tate Stars (1921–1922); Toledo Tigers (1923); St. Louis Stars (1923); Cleveland Browns (1924); Cleveland Elites (1926)

Robert L. Bonner (born April 1, 1894) was an American professional baseball first baseman, catcher and second baseman in the Negro leagues. He played from 1921 to 1926 with several teams.
