= Lee King (utility player) =

American baseball player (1894-1938)

- Outfielder
- Born: March 28, 1894; Waltham, Massachusetts, U.S.
- Died: September 7, 1938 (aged 44); Chelsea, Massachusetts, U.S.
- Batted: Right Threw: Right

MLB debut
- June 24, 1916, for the Philadelphia Athletics

Last MLB appearance
- April 28, 1919, for the Boston Braves

MLB statistics
- Batting average: .186
- Home runs: 0
- Runs batted in: 8
- Stats at Baseball Reference

Teams
- Philadelphia Athletics (1916); Boston Braves (1919)

Edward Lee King (March 28, 1894 – September 7, 1938) was an American Major League Baseball outfielder. He started his career with the 1916 Philadelphia Athletics, for which he batted .188 in 42 games. He spent most of 1917 and 1919 playing for Springfield of the Eastern League.

== Sources ==
- Career statistics from Baseball Reference · Baseball Reference (Minors) · Retrosheet · Baseball Almanac
