= Bill Morrisette (baseball) =

American baseball player (1894–1966)

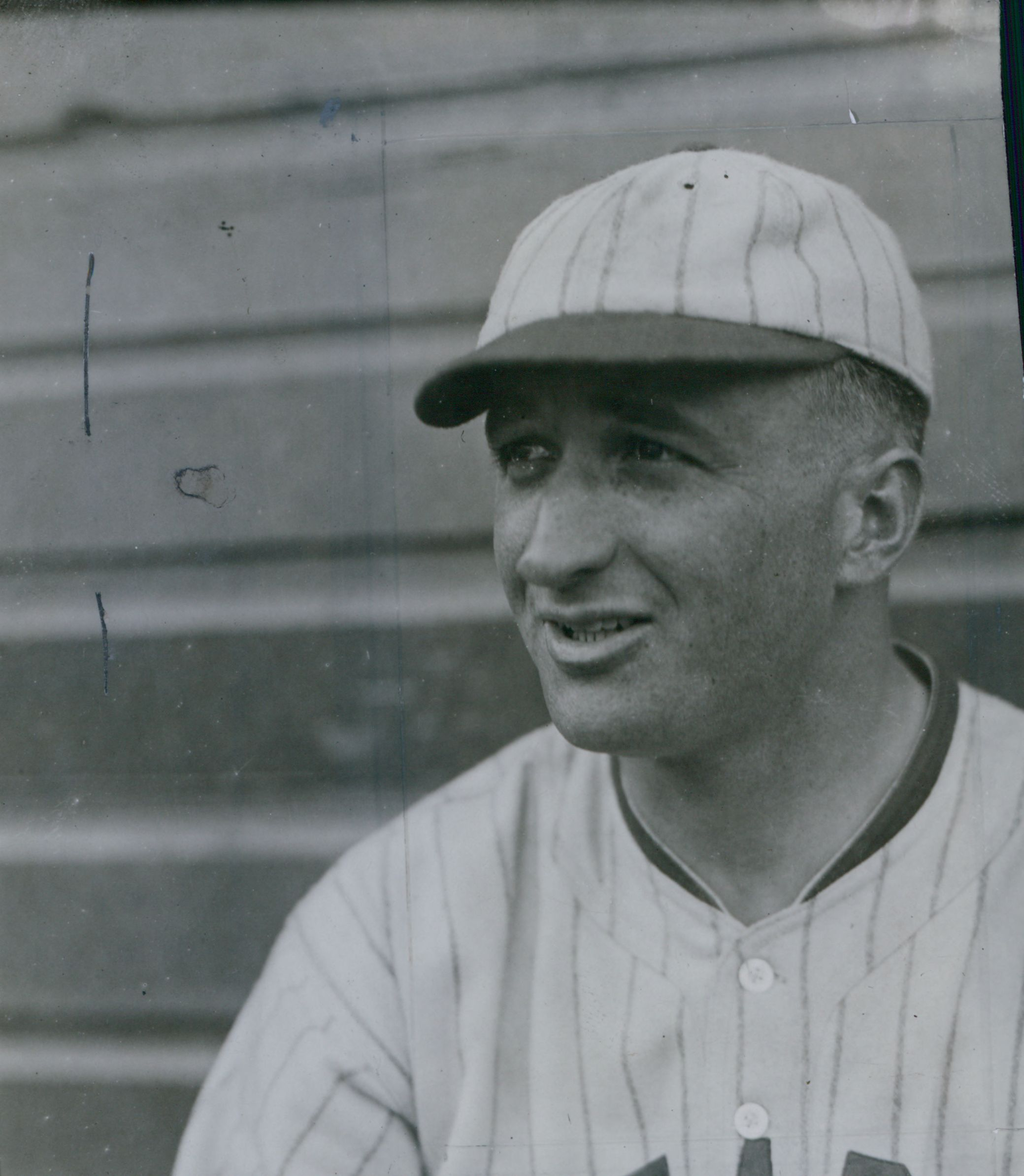
- Pitcher
- Born: November 21, 1894; Portsmouth, Virginia, U.S.
- Died: March 25, 1966 (aged 71); Virginia Beach, Virginia, U.S.
- Batted: Right Threw: Right

MLB debut
- September 18, 1915, for the Philadelphia Athletics

Last MLB appearance
- September 23, 1920, for the Detroit Tigers

MLB statistics
- Earned run average: 3.35
- Record: 3-1
- Strikeouts: 28
- Stats at Baseball Reference

Teams
- Philadelphia Athletics (1915–1916); Detroit Tigers (1920)

William Lee Morrisette (November 21, 1894 – March 25, 1966) was an American Major League Baseball pitcher. He played for the Philadelphia Athletics during the 1915 and 1916 seasons and the Detroit Tigers during the 1920 season. In the 1920s he played minor league baseball with the Little Rock Travelers and the Shamokin Shammies.
