= 1916 in baseball =

The following are the baseball events of the year 1916 throughout the world.

== Champions ==
- World Series: Boston Red Sox over Brooklyn Robins (4–1)

== Statistical leaders ==
Any team shown in small text indicates a previous team a player was on during the season.

| | American League | | National League | |
| Stat | Player | Total | Player | Total |
|---|---|---|---|---|
| AVG | Tris Speaker (CLE) | .386 | Hal Chase (CIN) | .339 |
| HR | Wally Pipp (NYY) | 12 | Dave Robertson (NYG); Cy Williams (CHC) | 12 |
| RBI | Del Pratt (SLB) | 103 | Heinie Zimmerman (NYG/CHC) | 128 |
| W | Walter Johnson (WSH) | 25 | Grover Alexander^{1} (PHI) | 33 |
| ERA | Babe Ruth (BOS) | 1.75 | Grover Alexander^{1} (PHI) | 1.55 |
| K | Walter Johnson (WSH) | 228 | Grover Alexander^{1} (PHI) | 167 |

^{1} National League Triple Crown pitching winner

== Major league baseball final standings ==
=== American League final standings ===
American League
| Team | W | L | Pct. | GB | Home | Road |
|---|---|---|---|---|---|---|
| Boston Red Sox | 91 | 63 | .591 | — | 49‍–‍28 | 42‍–‍35 |
| Chicago White Sox | 89 | 65 | .578 | 2 | 49‍–‍28 | 40‍–‍37 |
| Detroit Tigers | 87 | 67 | .565 | 4 | 49‍–‍28 | 38‍–‍39 |
| New York Yankees | 80 | 74 | .519 | 11 | 46‍–‍31 | 34‍–‍43 |
| St. Louis Browns | 79 | 75 | .513 | 12 | 45‍–‍32 | 34‍–‍43 |
| Cleveland Indians | 77 | 77 | .500 | 14 | 44‍–‍33 | 33‍–‍44 |
| Washington Senators | 76 | 77 | .497 | 14½ | 49‍–‍28 | 27‍–‍49 |
| Philadelphia Athletics | 36 | 117 | .235 | 54½ | 23‍–‍53 | 13‍–‍64 |

Locations of teams for the 1915–1922 American League seasons
American League

=== National League final standings ===
National League
| Team | W | L | Pct. | GB | Home | Road |
|---|---|---|---|---|---|---|
| Brooklyn Robins | 94 | 60 | .610 | — | 50‍–‍27 | 44‍–‍33 |
| Philadelphia Phillies | 91 | 62 | .595 | 2½ | 50‍–‍29 | 41‍–‍33 |
| Boston Braves | 89 | 63 | .586 | 4 | 41‍–‍31 | 48‍–‍32 |
| New York Giants | 86 | 66 | .566 | 7 | 47‍–‍30 | 39‍–‍36 |
| Chicago Cubs | 67 | 86 | .438 | 26½ | 37‍–‍41 | 30‍–‍45 |
| Pittsburgh Pirates | 65 | 89 | .422 | 29 | 37‍–‍40 | 28‍–‍49 |
| St. Louis Cardinals | 60 | 93 | .392 | 33½ | 36‍–‍40 | 24‍–‍53 |
| Cincinnati Reds | 60 | 93 | .392 | 33½ | 32‍–‍44 | 28‍–‍49 |

Locations of teams for the 1916–1919 National League seasons
National League

== Events ==
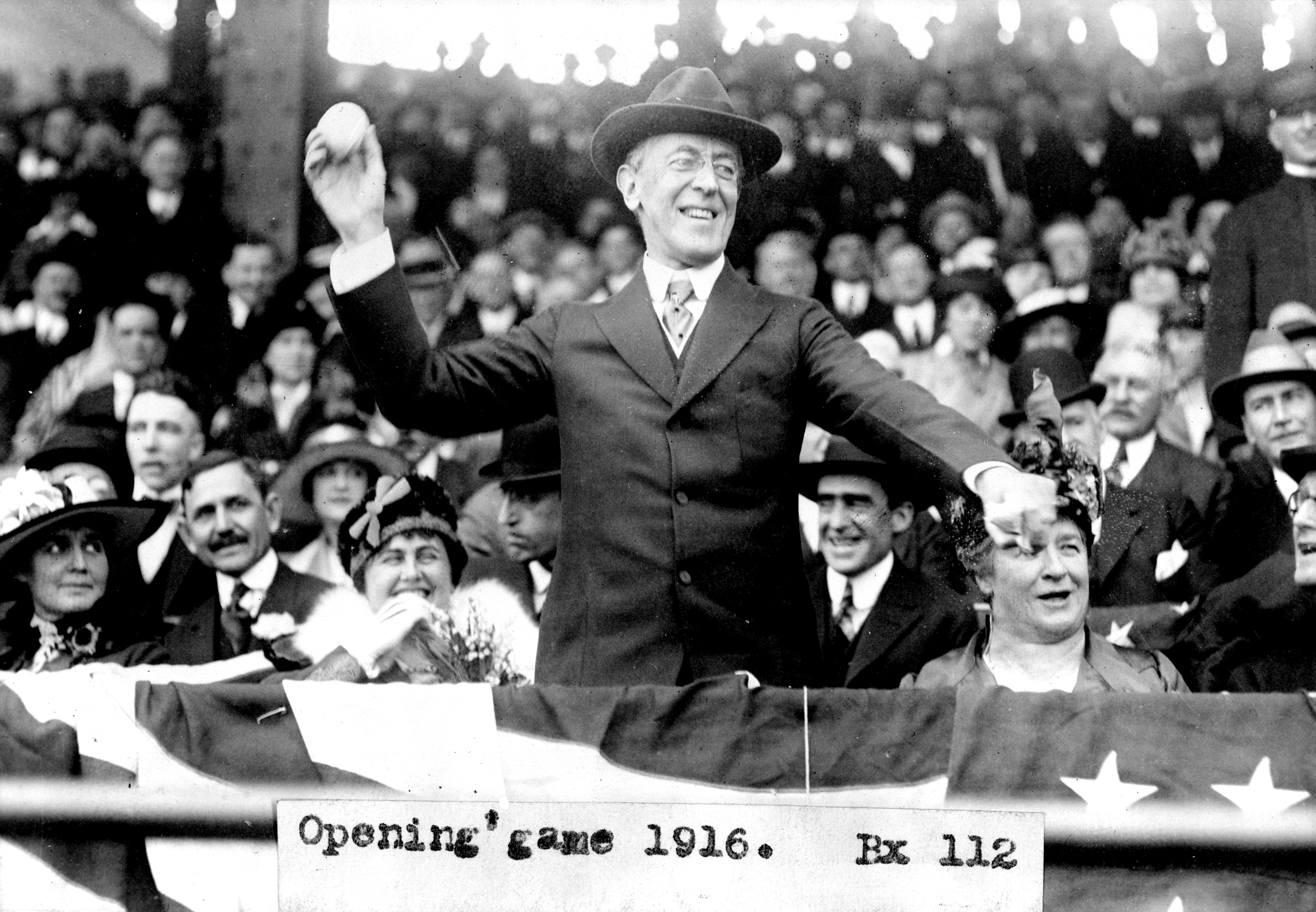
President Woodrow Wilson throws out the ball on opening day.

- January 5 – Charles H. Weeghman, former president of the Federal League Chicago Whales club, agreed to pay $500,000 in cash to Charles P. Taft for the stock the Chicago Cubs of the National League. Weeghman, owner of a popular restaurant chain, headed a syndicate including the chewing gum manufacturer William Wrigley Jr., who became a minority stock holder by putting up $50,000. Whales manager Joe Tinker succeeds Roger Bresnahan, and the Cubs will play in the Federal League's newly built ballpark on the North Side, soon to become known as Wrigley Field. Weeghman would become the first to officially allow fans to keep any and all balls hit into the stands.
- January 17 – The New York Giants acquire pitcher Fred Anderson, outfielder Benny Kauff and catcher Bill Rariden, three stars from the defunct Federal League.
- January 24 – At the International League owner's meeting, President Ed Barrow announced that the Richmond Climbers would return to Baltimore, where the team had played until 1914. The Harrisburg Senators in turn relocated to Richmond.
- February 7 – The Federal League's year-old suit charging antitrust violations by organized baseball is dismissed by mutual consent in U.S. District Court in Chicago by Judge Kenesaw Mountain Landis. No appellate decision is written and it will not be until 1922 when the courts rule on antitrust law.
- February 18 – James R. Price and Fred Tenney purchased the Jersey City Skeeters from the International League, which had controlled the club since 1915. Price and Tenney moved the team to Newark, New Jersey.
- April 12 – Taking the ball on Opening Day, Babe Ruth won over the Philadelphia Athletics, 2–1, to start the Boston Red Sox off to a streak of six victories in their first eight games.
- May 9 – The Philadelphia Athletics and the Detroit Tigers combined to set a Major League record with thirty walks during a 16–2, Tigers win. Eighteen walks were issued by the Athletics, who went on to finish the season with 715. Detroit added eleven more the following day for a two-game Major League record of twenty-nine.
- June 16 – Tom Hughes tosses a no-hitter for the Boston Braves in a 2–0 victory over the Pittsburgh Pirates.
- June 21 – Rube Foster pitches a no-hitter as the Boston Red Sox defeat the New York Yankees, 2–0.
- June 22 – The Boston Braves pulled off a triple steal in the eleventh inning, to defeat the New York Giants, 3–1. It is the only extra-inning triple steal in National League history. In 1941, the American League would match the feat with their only recorded extra-inning triple swipe.
- June 28 – William Fischer of the Chicago Cubs set a Major League record by catching all twenty-seven innings of a doubleheader against the Pittsburgh Pirates. The Pirates won the first game, which went 9 innings, by a score of 3 – 2, and the second game, which went 18 innings, by the same score.
- July 28 – In the course of an 8–6 defeat to the St Louis Browns, Philadelphia Athletics second baseman Nap Lajoie plays his lone game in center field.
- August 15 – Babe Ruth of the Boston Red Sox outdueled Washington Senators ace Walter Johnson, 1–0, in a contest played at Fenway Park. From the 7th inning on, Ruth surrendered just an infield single by Clyde Milan in the 11th frame. Milan also prived Ruth of a home run in the 12th by grabbing a ball heading into the right field stands. Ruth is now 3–0 in his pitching meetings with Johnson.
- August 26 – Despite his team suffering through perhaps the worst season in baseball history, Philadelphia Athletics hurler Bullet Joe Bush tosses a no-hitter against the Cleveland Indians. Philadelphia wins, 5–0.
- August 29 – Boston Red Sox pitcher Dutch Leonard allowed two runs on two hits, one walk, one hit-by-pitch and a wild pitch, before being relieved during the first inning of a game against the St. Louis Browns. One day later, Leonard pitched a 4–0 no-hitter versus the Browns.
- September 8 – Philadelphia Athletics switch-hitter Wally Schang belted two home runs against the New York Yankees, to become the first player in Major League history to hit home runs from both sides of the plate during a single game.
- September 17 – St. Louis Browns pitcher George Sisler out-duels the Washington Senators' legend Walter Johnson, 1–0. It will be the last Major League pitching victory for Sisler, who will become a member of the Hall of Fame as a first baseman in 1939.
- October 12 – The Boston Red Sox defeat the Brooklyn Robins, 4–1, in Game 5 of the World Series to win their second consecutive World Championship and fourth overall. Boston's Babe Ruth pitched 13 shutout innings in Game 2, starting a consecutive scoreless innings streak that would reach 29 in the 1918 Series.
- November 29 – In Kansas City, Missouri, pitchers Walter Johnson and Grover Cleveland Alexander face each other for the first time. The exhibition game between the two stars features Zach Wheat, Casey Stengel, Max Carey and Hal Chase, between others. Johnson's team prevail over Alexander's, 3–2.
- December 2 – 1916 – Under pressure from the Players' League, the National Commission orders that injured players shall get full pay for the duration of their contracts. The injury clause previously let clubs suspend players after 15 days pay.
- Unknown date – Pat Pieper begins 59-year career as public address announcer for the Chicago Cubs

== Births ==
=== January ===
- January 3 – Chico Hernández
- January 6 – Phil Masi
- January 7 – Ed Butka
- January 8 – Joe Just
- January 9 – Charley Stanceu
- January 13 – Bama Rowell
- January 23 – Johnny Sturm
- January 24 – Jack Brickhouse
- January 24 – Clem Dreisewerd
- January 24 – Wally Judnich
- January 25 – Glenn Gardner
- January 28 – Bob Muncrief
- January 28 – Pat Tobin

=== February ===
- February 2 – Mike Garbark
- February 3 – Daniel Canónico
- February 5 – Dewey Williams
- February 6 – Don Fisher
- February 9 – Tex Hughson
- February 9 – Freddy Schmidt
- February 11 – George Hausmann
- February 11 – Sam Page
- February 14 – Grover Froese
- February 23 – Eddie Kearse
- February 26 – Preacher Roe
- February 27 – Don Hanski
- February 28 – Howie Krist

=== March ===
- March 1 – Bing Devine
- March 2 – Mickey Rocco
- March 3 – Bill Kalfass
- March 9 – Woody Rich
- March 12 – René Monteagudo
- March 18 – Hiram Bithorn
- March 18 – Elbie Fletcher
- March 18 – Eddie Lake
- March 20 – Gordon Houston

=== April ===
- April 1 – George Staller
- April 4 – Mickey Owen
- April 4 – Willie Ramsdell
- April 11 – Joe Antolick
- April 11 – Sam Chapman
- April 14 – Johnny Hutchings
- April 14 – Jerry Lynn
- April 16 – Pete Suder
- April 23 – Jack Creel
- April 27 – Enos Slaughter
- April 28 – Mike Chartak
- April 29 – Art Kenney

=== May ===
- May 1 – Victor Starffin
- May 3 – Ken Silvestri
- May 12 – Hank Borowy
- May 12 – Dixie Parsons
- May 14 – Red Hayworth
- May 20 – Joe Wood
- May 25 – Frank Drews
- May 27 – John Dudra

=== June ===
- June 3 – Max Wilson
- June 5 – Eddie Joost
- June 6 – Dario Lodigiani
- June 15 – Bud Stewart
- June 16 – Joe Rullo
- June 17 – Joe Burns
- June 23 – Ken Jungels
- June 27 – Cecil Kaiser
- June 27 – Fuzz White
- June 28 – Shosei Go

=== July ===
- July 1 – Bob Prince
- July 6 – Bill Donovan
- July 9 – Ned Harris
- July 15 – Doyt Morris
- July 17 – Fred Chapman
- July 18 – Johnny Hopp
- July 19 – Phil Cavarretta
- July 20 – Don Black
- July 24 – Al Flair
- July 24 – Dick Hahn
- July 31 – Billy Hitchcock

=== August ===
- August 1 – Pep Rambert
- August 1 – Floyd Stromme
- August 8 – Ed Steele
- August 10 – Buddy Lewis
- August 10 – Jim Mertz
- August 14 – Fumio Fujimura
- August 14 – Irene Hickson
- August 15 – Cecil Garriott
- August 21 – Murry Dickson
- August 22 – Frankie Kelleher
- August 24 – Luis Suárez
- August 26 – Adrián Zabala
- August 30 – Johnny Lindell
- August 31 – Danny Litwhiler
- August 31 – Ray Mack

=== September ===
- September 5 – Ernie White
- September 7 – Lefty Sullivan
- September 8 – Jim Bagby
- September 8 – Tom Turner
- September 11 – Ellis Clary
- September 12 – Ralph Hamner
- September 12 – Charlie Keller
- September 13 – Roy Zimmerman
- September 19 – Rube Fischer
- September 19 – Bob McNamara
- September 20 – Red Juelich
- September 25 – Norm Schlueter
- September 28 – Al Evans

=== October ===
- October 7 – Russ Derry
- October 8 – Joe Callahan
- October 8 – Rex Cecil
- October 10 – Floyd Baker
- October 12 – Sam Gentile
- October 13 – Ray Hathaway
- October 19 – Ralph McLeod
- October 21 – Bill Bevens
- October 21 – Eddie Carnett
- October 22 – Harry Walker
- October 28 – Ed Levy
- October 30 – Leon Day
- October 31 – Ken Keltner

=== November ===
- November 2 – Al Campanis
- November 2 – Fran Matthews
- November 4 – Emil Kush
- November 5 – Jim Tabor
- November 7 – Joe Hatten
- November 8 – Andrés Fleitas
- November 9 – Walt Lanfranconi
- November 13 – Nick Goulish
- November 15 – Milt Byrnes
- November 15 – Joe Ostrowski
- November 18 – Ken Burkhart
- November 18 – James Moore
- November 23 – Eddie Collins
- November 25 – Oscar Georgy
- November 26 – Bob Elliott
- November 26 – Eddie Miller
- November 26 – Walt Ripley
- November 28 – Max West

=== December ===
- December 4 – Ray Sanders
- December 5 – Steve Rachunok
- December 5 – Len Schulte
- December 7 – Jorge Comellas
- December 13 – Hank Majeski
- December 13 – Lou Thuman
- December 14 – Gene Stack
- December 24 – Jack Graham
- December 27 – Charlie Brewster

== Deaths ==
=== January–February ===
- January 1 – Jake Drauby, 52, third baseman who hit .206 in ten games for the Washington Senators of the National League in 1892.
- January 6 – King Cole, 29, pitcher who was 20–4 and led National League in ERA for the 1910 Chicago Cubs; gave up Babe Ruth's first hit in 1914, and inspired Ring Lardner's "Alibi Ike" stories.
- January 20 – Emmet Heidrick, 39, centerfielder for four teams in the National and American leagues between 1898 and 1908, who collected a .300 average and 186 stolen bases in 757 career games.
- February 5 – Ed Irwin, 34, third baseman who played one game for the 1912 Detroit Tigers of the American League.
- February 14 – Pat Carroll, 62, Union Association catcher and right fielder for the Altoona Mountain City and the Philadelphia Keystones in the 1884 season.
- February 25 – Art Allison, 67, outfielder-first baseman who hit .254 for five teams between 1871 and 1876.

=== March–April ===
- March 4 – Abe Wolstenholme, 55, catcher for the 1883 Philadelphia Quakers of the National League.
- March 7 – Fred Donovan, 51, catcher for the Cleveland Spiders of the National League in 1895.
- March 23 – Frank Graves, 55, catcher for the 1886 St. Louis Maroons of the National League.
- March 28 – Eddie Hohnhorst, 51, first baseman for the Cleveland Naps of the American League in the 1910 and 1912 seasons.
- April 6 – Fred Mann, 58, centerfielder who hit .262 and scored 388 runs in 577 games for five clubs from 1882 to 1887.
- April 8 – Bill Moran, 46, National League catcher who hit a .147 average in 39 games with the St. Louis Browns (1892) and the Chicago Colts (1895).
- April 16 – Jim McTamany, 52, center fielder for four teams from 1885 to 1891, who led the American Association in runs (140) and walks (112) in 1890, while collecting 255 stolen bases and a .371 on-base percentage in 813 career-games.
- April 26 – Skyrocket Smith, first baseman who hit a .238 average with a .349 on-base percentage for the Louisville Colonels of the American Association in 1888.
- April 27 – Jul Kustus, 33, outfielder who hit .145 in x games for the 1909 Brooklyn Superbas of the National League.

=== May–June ===
- May 31 – Bud Sharpe, 34, National League who hit .222 in parts of two seasons for the Boston Beaneaters (1905) and Pittsburgh Pirates (1910).
- June 10 – Jack Chapman, 73, one of the foremost players of the early 1860s, who became famous for his many long running catches at right field, receiving the colorful nickname ″Death to Flying Things″; later a highly respected manager from 1876 to 1892, winning one championship in 1890 with the Louisville Colonels of the American Association.
- June 19 – John Dodge, 27, National League third baseman for the 1912 Philadelphia Phillies and the 1913 Cincinnati Reds, who died after being hit in the head by a pitch during a minor league game.

=== July–August ===
- July 15 – Ira Belden, 42, American Association outfielder for the Cleveland Spiders in 1897.
- July 22 – George Ziegler, 44[?], who pitched one game for the 1890 Pittsburgh Alleghenys of the National League.
- August 15 – John Dyler, 64, left fielder for the Louisville Eclipse American Association team in 1882.
- August 23 – Bill George, 51, pitcher/outfielder who played from 1887 through 1889 for the New York Giants (National League) and Columbus Solons (American Association).

=== September–October ===
- September 2 – Chick Evans, 26, National League pitcher who posted a 1–4 record and a 4.96 ERA in 17 games for the Boston Doves in the 1909 and 1910 seasons, who also hurled a perfect game in the minors in which not a single batter hit a ball out of the infield.
- September 23 – Monk Cline, 58, American Association outfielder who hit .261 in 232 games with the Baltimore Orioles, Kansas City Cowboys and the Louisville Eclipse/Colonels between 1882 and 1891.
- October 10 – Dick McBride, 71, pitcher-manager for the Philadelphia Athletics of the National Association from 1871 to 1875, who also played for the 1876 Boston Red Caps of the National League.
- October 11 – Harry Luff, 64, infielder/outfielder/pitcher who played between 1875 and 1884 for six clubs in four different leagues.
- October 13 – Cyclone Miller, 57, pitcher who posted a 14–11 record and a 3.04 ERA in 27 games with four teams in the 1884 and 1886 seasons.
- October 16 – Henry Killeen, 44, pitcher for the 1891 Cleveland Spiders of the National League.
- October 24 – Hi Ebright, 57, catcher who hit .254 for the Washington Senators of the National League in 1889.
- October 31 – Nicholas Young, 76, president of the National League (1885–1902) and league secretary (1876–1902), who also managed the Washington team in the National Association and umpired in that league.

=== November–December ===
- November 2 – Richard Johns, 67, National Association umpire
- November 12 – Mike Roach, 46, catcher for the 1899 Washington Senators of the National League.
- November 12 – Will Foley, 60, third baseman who played between 1875 and 1884 for five clubs in three different leagues.
- November 15 – Jack Farrell 60, center fielder who hit .385 in three games with the 1874 Hartford Dark Blues of the National Association.
- November 29 – Bob Unglaub, 35, American League infielder for the New York Highlanders, Boston Americans and Washington Senators between 1904 and 1910, who also managed the Americans in the 1907 season.
- December 3 – Reddy Mack, 50, Irish second baseman who played in the American Association for the Louisville Colonels (1886–1888) and Baltimore Orioles (1889–1890).
- December 5 – John Cuff, 52, catcher for the 1884 Baltimore Monumentals of the Union Association.
- December 17 – Scoops Carey, 46, a .271 career-hitter with four clubs, who led first basemen in fielding average in both the National League (1895) and American League (1902).
- December 17 – Elias Peak, 57, second baseman who hit a combined .202 average with the Boston Reds and Philadelphia Keystones in the 1884 season.
- December 19 – Doug Allison, 70, catcher who played from 1868 through 1883 for ten different teams, including for the undefeated 1869 Cincinnati Red Stockings, who is the earliest known player to use a glove, when he donned buckskin mittens to protect his hands in 1870.
- December 19 – John McGuinness, 60[?], Irish first baseman and a .244 career hitter in 162 games with the New York Mutuals (1876), Syracuse Stars (1879), and Philadelphia Keystones (1884).
- December 23 – Erve Beck, 38, second baseman for four different teams in the American and National Leagues between 1899 and 1902; his 71 doubles in 1900 for minor-league Toledo stood as an Organized Baseball record for 23 years.
- December 23 – Howard Earl, 47, outfielder who hit .248 with eight homers and 68 RBI for the 1890 Chicago Colts and the 1890 Milwaukee Brewers.
- December 25 – Bill Moriarty, 33, backup shortstop for the 1909 Cincinnati Reds.
- December 29 – Ed Doheny, 43, pitcher who played from 1895 through 1903 for the New York Giants and Pittsburgh Pirates, compiling a 75–83 and a 3.73 ERA in 75 games, while allowing only 13 home runs in 1405 innings for a .083 HR/9 average, 16th on all-time list.
