= 1916 Cleveland Indians season =

1916 Cleveland Indians
- League: American League
- Ballpark: Dunn Field
- City: Cleveland, Ohio
- Record: 77–77 (.500)
- League place: 6th
- Owners: Jim Dunn
- Managers: Lee Fohl

The 1916 Cleveland Indians season was a season in American baseball. The team finished sixth in the American League with a record of 77–77, 14 games behind the Boston Red Sox.

== Regular season ==
=== Season standings ===
American League
Team	W	L	Pct.	GB	Home	Road
Boston Red Sox	91	63	.591	—	49‍–‍28	42‍–‍35
Chicago White Sox	89	65	.578	2	49‍–‍28	40‍–‍37
Detroit Tigers	87	67	.565	4	49‍–‍28	38‍–‍39
New York Yankees	80	74	.519	11	46‍–‍31	34‍–‍43
St. Louis Browns	79	75	.513	12	45‍–‍32	34‍–‍43
Cleveland Indians	77	77	.500	14	44‍–‍33	33‍–‍44
Washington Senators	76	77	.497	14½	49‍–‍28	27‍–‍49
Philadelphia Athletics	36	117	.235	54½	23‍–‍53	13‍–‍64

=== Record vs. opponents ===
1916 American League record Sources:
Team	BOS	CWS	CLE	DET	NYY	PHA	SLB	WSH
Boston	—	14–8	15–7	14–8	11–11	16–6	10–12–1	11–11–1
Chicago	8–14	—	13–9	13–9	10–12	18–4	15–7	12–10–1
Cleveland	7–15	9–13	—	11–11	12–10	18–4	11–11–2	9–13–1
Detroit	8–14	9–13	11–11	—	14–8–1	18–4	13–9	14–8
New York	11–11	12–10	10–12	8–14–1	—	15–7	9–13	15–7–1
Philadelphia	6–16	4–18	4–18	4–18	7–15	—	5–17	6–15–1
St. Louis	12–10–1	7–15	11–11–2	9–13	13–9	17–5	—	10–12–1
Washington	11–11–1	10–12–1	13–9–1	8–14	7–15–1	15–6–1	12–10–1	—

=== Notable transactions ===
- April 12, 1916: Sad Sam Jones, Fred Thomas, and $55,000 were traded by the Indians to the Boston Red Sox for Tris Speaker.

=== Roster ===
Beginning June 26, the Indians pioneered the use of uniform numbers on their home uniform jerseys, the first team to do so in MLB. The numbers were used up till the 1917 season. Uniform numbers, though, were not worn on the away uniforms.

1916 Cleveland Indians
Roster
Pitchers: Jim Bagby; Fred Beebe; Joe Boehling; Fritz Coumbe; Stan Coveleski; Shorty Desjardien; Al Gould; Red Gunkel; Rip Hagerman; Ed Klepfer; Otis Lambeth; Grover Lowdermilk; Marty McHale; Willie Mitchell; Guy Morton; Ken Penner; Pop-Boy Smith	Catchers: Josh Billings; Jack Bradley; Bob Coleman; Tom Daly; Hank DeBerry; Steve O'Neill; Infielders: Walter Barbare; Al Bergman; Ray Chapman; Clyde Engle; Joe Evans; Chick Gandil; Lou Guisto; Ivan Howard; Marty Kavanagh; Joe Leonard; Terry Turner; Bill Wambsganss	Outfielders: Milo Allison; Jack Graney; Howard Lohr; Danny Moeller; Braggo Roth; Elmer Smith; Tris Speaker; Other batters: Larry Chappell; Ollie Welf	Manager: Lee Fohl

== Player stats ==
=== Batting ===
==== Starters by position ====
Note: Pos = Position; G = Games played; AB = At bats; H = Hits; Avg. = Batting average; HR = Home runs; RBI = Runs batted in

Pos	Player	G	AB	H	Avg.	HR	RBI
C	Steve O'Neill	130	378	89	.235	0	29
1B	Chick Gandil	146	533	138	.259	0	72
2B	Ivan Howard	81	246	46	.187	0	23
SS	Bill Wambsganss	136	475	117	.246	0	45
3B	Terry Turner	124	428	112	.262	0	38
OF	Braggo Roth	125	409	117	.286	4	72
OF	Tris Speaker	151	546	211	.386	2	79
OF	Jack Graney	155	589	142	.241	5	54

==== Other batters ====
Note: G = Games played; AB = At bats; H = Hits; Avg. = Batting average; HR = Home runs; RBI = Runs batted in

Player	G	AB	H	Avg.	HR	RBI
Ray Chapman	109	346	80	.231	0	27
Elmer Smith	79	213	59	.277	3	40
Joe Evans	33	82	12	.146	0	1
Tom Daly	31	73	16	.219	0	8
Walter Barbare	13	48	11	.229	0	3
Marty Kavanagh	19	44	11	.250	1	10
Hank DeBerry	15	33	9	.273	0	4
Josh Billings	22	31	5	.161	0	1
Danny Moeller	25	30	2	.067	0	1
Bob Coleman	19	28	6	.214	0	4
Clyde Engle	11	26	4	.154	0	1
Lou Guisto	6	19	3	.158	0	2
Milo Allison	14	18	5	.278	0	0
Al Bergman	8	14	3	.214	0	0
Howard Lohr	3	7	1	.143	0	1
Jack Bradley	2	3	0	.000	0	0
Larry Chappell	3	2	0	.000	0	0
Joe Leonard	3	2	0	.000	0	0
Ollie Welf	1	0	0	----	0	0

=== Pitching ===
==== Starting pitchers ====
Note: G = Games pitched; IP = Innings pitched; W = Wins; L = Losses; ERA = Earned run average; SO = Strikeouts

Player	G	IP	W	L	ERA	SO
Jim Bagby Sr.	48	272.2	16	17	2.61	88
Stan Coveleski	45	232.0	15	13	3.41	76
Guy Morton	27	149.2	12	6	2.89	88
Fred Beebe	20	100.2	5	3	2.41	32
Joe Boehling	12	60.2	2	4	2.67	18
Grover Lowdermilk	10	51.1	1	5	3.16	28

==== Other pitchers ====
Note: G = Games pitched; IP = Innings pitched; W = Wins; L = Losses; ERA = Earned run average; SO = Strikeouts

Player	G	IP	W	L	ERA	SO
Ed Klepfer	31	143.0	6	6	2.52	62
Fritz Coumbe	29	120.1	7	5	2.02	39
Al Gould	30	106.2	5	6	2.53	41
Otis Lambeth	15	74.0	4	4	2.92	28
Willie Mitchell	12	43.2	2	5	5.15	24
Pop-Boy Smith	5	25.2	1	2	3.86	4
Ken Penner	4	12.2	1	1	4.26	5

==== Relief pitchers ====
Note: G = Games pitched; W = Wins; L = Losses; SV = Saves; ERA = Earned run average; SO = Strikeouts

Player	G	W	L	SV	ERA	SO
Marty McHale	5	0	0	0	5.56	2
Rip Hagerman	2	0	0	0	12.27	1
Red Gunkel	1	0	0	0	0.00	1
Shorty Desjardien	1	0	0	0	18.00	0
