= 1916 St. Louis Browns season =

Major League Baseball season

1916 St. Louis Browns
- League: American League
- Ballpark: Sportsman's Park
- City: St. Louis, Missouri
- Record: 79–75 (.513)
- League place: 5th
- Owners: Phil Ball
- Managers: Fielder Jones

The 1916 St. Louis Browns season involved the Browns finishing fifth in the American League with a record of 79 wins and 75 losses.

== Offseason ==
- February 10, 1916: Harry Chapman, Ernie Johnson, and Ward Miller were purchased by the Browns from the St. Louis Terriers.

== Regular season ==
=== Season standings ===
American League
Team	W	L	Pct.	GB	Home	Road
Boston Red Sox	91	63	.591	—	49‍–‍28	42‍–‍35
Chicago White Sox	89	65	.578	2	49‍–‍28	40‍–‍37
Detroit Tigers	87	67	.565	4	49‍–‍28	38‍–‍39
New York Yankees	80	74	.519	11	46‍–‍31	34‍–‍43
St. Louis Browns	79	75	.513	12	45‍–‍32	34‍–‍43
Cleveland Indians	77	77	.500	14	44‍–‍33	33‍–‍44
Washington Senators	76	77	.497	14½	49‍–‍28	27‍–‍49
Philadelphia Athletics	36	117	.235	54½	23‍–‍53	13‍–‍64

=== Record vs. opponents ===
1916 American League record Sources:
Team	BOS	CWS	CLE	DET	NYY	PHA	SLB	WSH
Boston	—	14–8	15–7	14–8	11–11	16–6	10–12–1	11–11–1
Chicago	8–14	—	13–9	13–9	10–12	18–4	15–7	12–10–1
Cleveland	7–15	9–13	—	11–11	12–10	18–4	11–11–2	9–13–1
Detroit	8–14	9–13	11–11	—	14–8–1	18–4	13–9	14–8
New York	11–11	12–10	10–12	8–14–1	—	15–7	9–13	15–7–1
Philadelphia	6–16	4–18	4–18	4–18	7–15	—	5–17	6–15–1
St. Louis	12–10–1	7–15	11–11–2	9–13	13–9	17–5	—	10–12–1
Washington	11–11–1	10–12–1	13–9–1	8–14	7–15–1	15–6–1	12–10–1	—

=== Roster ===
1916 St. Louis Browns
Roster
Pitchers: George Baumgardner; Doc Crandall; Dave Davenport; Bill Fincher; Bob Groom; Earl Hamilton; Ernie Koob; Tim McCabe; Jim Park; Eddie Plank; Carl Weilman	Catchers: Harry Chapman; Verne Clemons; George Hale; Grover Hartley; Bill Rumler; Hank Severeid; Infielders: Jimmy Austin; Babe Borton; Charlie Deal; Ernie Johnson; Doc Lavan; Del Pratt; George Sisler; Bobby Wallace	Outfielders: Billy Lee; Armando Marsans; Ward Miller; Burt Shotton; Jack Tobin; Other batters: Ray Kennedy; Gene Paulette	Manager: Fielder Jones

== Player stats ==
=== Batting ===
==== Starters by position ====
Note: Pos = Position; G = Games played; AB = At bats; H = Hits; Avg. = Batting average; HR = Home runs; RBI = Runs batted in

Pos	Player	G	AB	H	Avg.	HR	RBI
C	Hank Severeid	100	293	80	.273	0	34
1B	George Sisler	151	580	177	.305	4	76
2B	Del Pratt	158	596	159	.267	5	103
SS	Doc Lavan	110	343	81	.236	0	19
3B	Jimmy Austin	129	411	85	.207	1	28
OF	Armando Marsans	151	528	134	.254	1	60
OF	Burt Shotton	156	614	174	.283	1	36
OF	Ward Miller	146	485	129	.266	1	50

==== Other batters ====
Note: G = Games played; AB = At bats; H = Hits; Avg. = Batting average; HR = Home runs; RBI = Runs batted in

Player	G	AB	H	Avg.	HR	RBI
Ernie Johnson	74	236	54	.229	0	19
Grover Hartley	89	222	50	.225	0	12
Jack Tobin	77	150	32	.213	0	10
Babe Borton	66	98	22	.224	1	12
Charlie Deal	23	74	10	.135	0	10
William Rumler	27	37	12	.324	0	10
Harry Chapman	18	31	3	.097	0	0
Bobby Wallace	14	18	5	.278	0	1
Verne Clemons	4	7	1	.143	0	0
Gene Paulette	5	4	2	.500	0	0
George Hale	4	1	0	.000	0	0
Ray Kennedy	1	1	0	.000	0	0

=== Pitching ===
==== Starting pitchers ====
Note: G = Games pitched; IP = Innings pitched; W = Wins; L = Losses; ERA = Earned run average; SO = Strikeouts

Player	G	IP	W	L	ERA	SO
Carl Weilman	46	276.0	17	18	2.15	91
Eddie Plank	37	235.2	16	15	2.33	88
Bob Groom	41	217.1	13	9	2.57	92
George Sisler	3	27.0	1	2	1.00	12

==== Other pitchers ====
Note: G = Games pitched; IP = Innings pitched; W = Wins; L = Losses; ERA = Earned run average; SO = Strikeouts

Player	G	IP	W	L	ERA	SO
Dave Davenport	59	290.2	12	11	2.85	129
Ernie Koob	33	166.2	11	8	2.54	26
Earl Hamilton	23	95.1	5	7	3.30	25
Jim Park	26	79.0	1	4	2.62	26
George Baumgardner	4	8.0	1	0	7.88	4

==== Relief pitchers ====
Note: G = Games pitched; W = Wins; L = Losses; SV = Saves; ERA = Earned run average; SO = Strikeouts

Player	G	W	L	SV	ERA	SO
Tim McCabe	13	2	0	0	3.16	7
Bill Fincher	12	0	1	0	2.14	5
Doc Crandall	2	0	0	0	27.00	0
