= 1916 New York Yankees season =

Season for the Major League Baseball team the New York Yankees

1916 New York Yankees
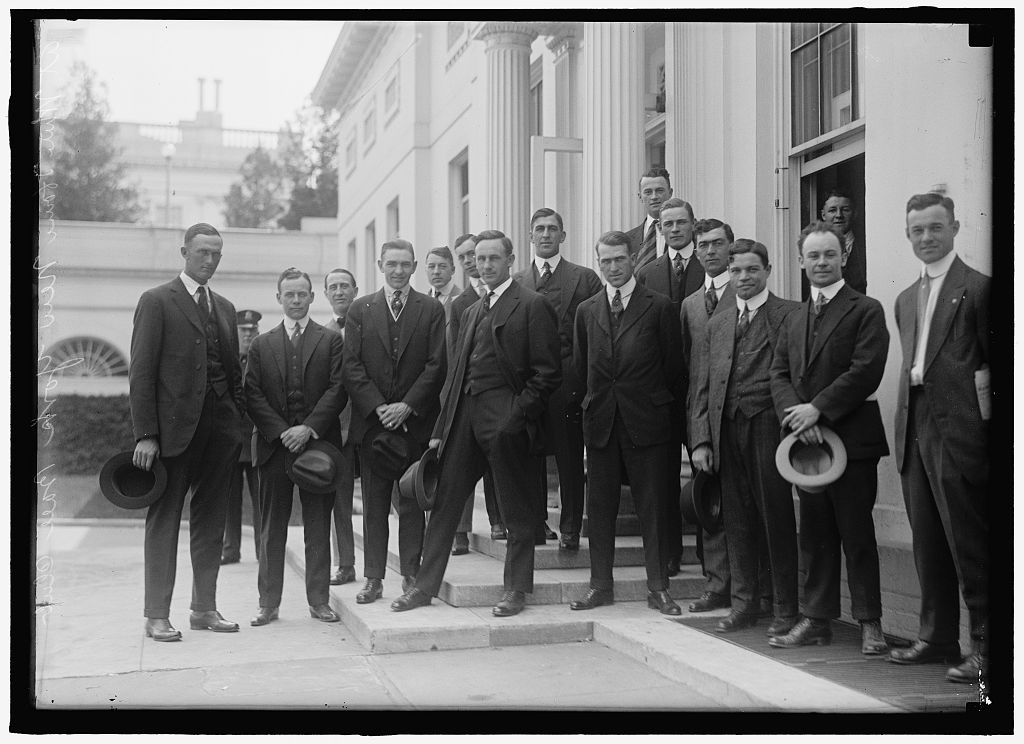
- The Yankees at the White House
- League: American League
- Ballpark: Polo Grounds
- City: New York City, New York
- Record: 80–74 (.519)
- League place: 4th
- Owners: Jacob Ruppert and Tillinghast L'Hommedieu Huston
- Managers: Bill Donovan

The 1916 New York Yankees season was the club's 14th season. The team finished with a record of 80–74 for their first winning season as the Yankees (and their first in 6 years when they were still officially known as the Highlanders) finishing 11 games behind the American League champion Boston Red Sox. New York was managed by Bill Donovan. Their home games were played at the Polo Grounds. This would be the final season that the famous "NY" logo would appear on the front of the jerseys until 1936.

== Opening game ==
The game was on April 20, 1916, at Griffith Stadium against the Washington Senators. President Woodrow Wilson threw out the ceremonial first pitch. The Senators, behind Walter Johnson, defeated New York, 12–4.

== Regular season ==
=== Season standings ===
American League
Team	W	L	Pct.	GB	Home	Road
Boston Red Sox	91	63	.591	—	49‍–‍28	42‍–‍35
Chicago White Sox	89	65	.578	2	49‍–‍28	40‍–‍37
Detroit Tigers	87	67	.565	4	49‍–‍28	38‍–‍39
New York Yankees	80	74	.519	11	46‍–‍31	34‍–‍43
St. Louis Browns	79	75	.513	12	45‍–‍32	34‍–‍43
Cleveland Indians	77	77	.500	14	44‍–‍33	33‍–‍44
Washington Senators	76	77	.497	14½	49‍–‍28	27‍–‍49
Philadelphia Athletics	36	117	.235	54½	23‍–‍53	13‍–‍64

=== Record vs. opponents ===
1916 American League record Sources:
Team	BOS	CWS	CLE	DET	NYY	PHA	SLB	WSH
Boston	—	14–8	15–7	14–8	11–11	16–6	10–12–1	11–11–1
Chicago	8–14	—	13–9	13–9	10–12	18–4	15–7	12–10–1
Cleveland	7–15	9–13	—	11–11	12–10	18–4	11–11–2	9–13–1
Detroit	8–14	9–13	11–11	—	14–8–1	18–4	13–9	14–8
New York	11–11	12–10	10–12	8–14–1	—	15–7	9–13	15–7–1
Philadelphia	6–16	4–18	4–18	4–18	7–15	—	5–17	6–15–1
St. Louis	12–10–1	7–15	11–11–2	9–13	13–9	17–5	—	10–12–1
Washington	11–11–1	10–12–1	13–9–1	8–14	7–15–1	15–6–1	12–10–1	—

=== Roster ===
1916 New York Yankees
Roster
Pitchers: Jess Buckles; Ray Caldwell; Mike Cantwell; Nick Cullop; Bill Donovan; Ray Fisher; Ray Keating; Slim Love; Cliff Markle; George Mogridge; Allen Russell; Bob Shawkey; Urban Shocker	Catchers: Walt Alexander; Les Nunamaker; Roxy Walters; Infielders: Ángel Aragón; Home Run Baker; Lute Boone; Joe Gedeon; Charlie Mullen; Roger Peckinpaugh; Wally Pipp	Outfielders: Paddy Baumann; Doc Cook; Frank Gilhooley; Roy Hartzell; Tim Hendryx; Hugh High; Solly Hofman; Lee Magee; Fritz Maisel; Elmer Miller; Rube Oldring; Germany Schaefer	Manager: Bill Donovan; Coaches: Duke Farrell; Germany Schaefer

== Player stats ==
=== Batting ===
==== Starters by position ====
Note: Pos = Position; G = Games played; AB = At bats; H = Hits; Avg. = Batting average; HR = Home runs; RBI = Runs batted in

Pos	Player	G	AB	H	Avg.	HR	RBI
C	Les Nunamaker	91	260	77	.296	0	28
1B	Wally Pipp	151	545	143	.262	12	93
2B	Joe Gedeon	122	435	92	.211	0	27
SS	Roger Peckinpaugh	145	552	141	.255	4	58
3B	Home Run Baker	100	360	97	.269	10	52
OF	Lee Magee	131	510	131	.257	3	45
OF	Frank Gilhooley	58	223	62	.278	1	10
OF	Hugh High	116	377	99	.263	1	28

==== Other batters ====
Note: G = Games played; AB = At bats; H = Hits; Avg. = Batting average; HR = Home runs; RBI = Runs batted in

Player	G	AB	H	Avg.	HR	RBI
Paddy Baumann	79	237	68	.287	1	25
Roxy Walters	66	203	54	.266	0	23
Fritz Maisel	53	158	36	.228	0	7
Rube Oldring	43	158	37	.234	1	12
Elmer Miller	43	152	34	.224	1	18
Charlie Mullen	59	146	39	.267	0	18
Lute Boone	46	124	23	.185	1	8
Walt Alexander	36	78	20	.256	0	3
Roy Hartzell	33	64	12	.188	0	7
Tim Hendryx	15	62	18	.290	0	5
Solly Hofman	6	27	8	.296	0	2
Ángel Aragón	12	24	5	.208	0	3
Doc Cook	4	10	1	.100	0	1
Germany Schaefer	1	1	0	.000	0	0

=== Pitching ===
==== Starting pitchers ====
Note: G = Games pitched; IP = Innings pitched; W = Wins; L = Losses; ERA = Earned run average; SO = Strikeouts

Player	G	IP	W	L	ERA	SO
Bob Shawkey	53	276.2	24	14	2.21	122
George Mogridge	30	194.2	6	12	2.31	66
Ray Fisher	31	179.0	11	8	3.17	56
Nick Cullop	28	167.0	13	6	2.05	77
Ray Caldwell	21	165.2	5	12	2.99	76
Ray Keating	14	91.0	5	6	3.07	35
Urban Shocker	12	82.1	4	3	2.62	43

==== Other pitchers ====
Note: G = Games pitched; IP = Innings pitched; W = Wins; L = Losses; ERA = Earned run average; SO = Strikeouts

Player	G	IP	W	L	ERA	SO
Allen Russell	34	171.1	6	10	3.20	104
Cliff Markle	11	45.2	4	3	4.53	14

==== Relief pitchers ====
Note: G = Games pitched; W = Wins; L = Losses; SV = Saves; ERA = Earned run average; SO = Strikeouts

Player	G	W	L	SV	ERA	SO
Slim Love	20	2	0	0	4.91	21
Jess Buckles	2	0	0	0	2.25	2
Mike Cantwell	1	0	0	0	0.00	0
Bill Donovan	1	0	0	0	0.00	0
