= 1916 Chicago White Sox season =

1916 Chicago White Sox
- League: American League
- Ballpark: Comiskey Park
- City: Chicago, Illinois
- Record: 89–65 (.578)
- League place: 2nd
- Owners: Charles Comiskey
- Managers: Pants Rowland

The 1916 Chicago White Sox finished second in the American League, just two games behind the first-place Boston Red Sox. By this time, the nucleus of the 1917–19 dynasty was in place. Chicago would win the World Series the following season.

== Regular season ==
This was Shoeless Joe Jackson's first full season with the White Sox. He led the team in batting with a .341 average and finished third in the league overall. Eddie Collins and Happy Felsch also hit .300. The pitching staff was well-balanced, with seven men making at least 14 starts.

=== Season standings ===
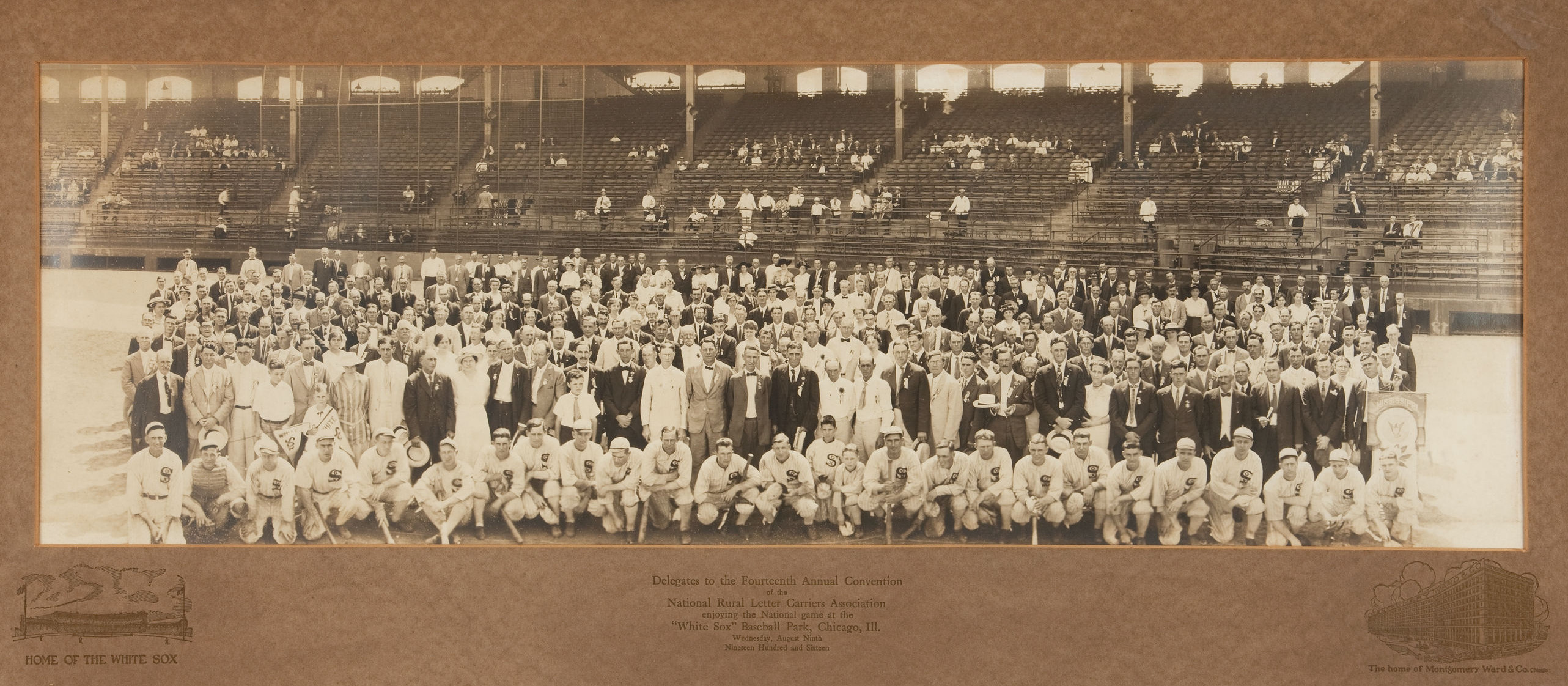

American League
| Team | W | L | Pct. | GB | Home | Road |
|---|---|---|---|---|---|---|
| Boston Red Sox | 91 | 63 | .591 | — | 49‍–‍28 | 42‍–‍35 |
| Chicago White Sox | 89 | 65 | .578 | 2 | 49‍–‍28 | 40‍–‍37 |
| Detroit Tigers | 87 | 67 | .565 | 4 | 49‍–‍28 | 38‍–‍39 |
| New York Yankees | 80 | 74 | .519 | 11 | 46‍–‍31 | 34‍–‍43 |
| St. Louis Browns | 79 | 75 | .513 | 12 | 45‍–‍32 | 34‍–‍43 |
| Cleveland Indians | 77 | 77 | .500 | 14 | 44‍–‍33 | 33‍–‍44 |
| Washington Senators | 76 | 77 | .497 | 14½ | 49‍–‍28 | 27‍–‍49 |
| Philadelphia Athletics | 36 | 117 | .235 | 54½ | 23‍–‍53 | 13‍–‍64 |

=== Record vs. opponents ===
1916 American League record Sources:
| Team | BOS | CWS | CLE | DET | NYY | PHA | SLB | WSH |
|---|---|---|---|---|---|---|---|---|
| Boston | — | 14–8 | 15–7 | 14–8 | 11–11 | 16–6 | 10–12–1 | 11–11–1 |
| Chicago | 8–14 | — | 13–9 | 13–9 | 10–12 | 18–4 | 15–7 | 12–10–1 |
| Cleveland | 7–15 | 9–13 | — | 11–11 | 12–10 | 18–4 | 11–11–2 | 9–13–1 |
| Detroit | 8–14 | 9–13 | 11–11 | — | 14–8–1 | 18–4 | 13–9 | 14–8 |
| New York | 11–11 | 12–10 | 10–12 | 8–14–1 | — | 15–7 | 9–13 | 15–7–1 |
| Philadelphia | 6–16 | 4–18 | 4–18 | 4–18 | 7–15 | — | 5–17 | 6–15–1 |
| St. Louis | 12–10–1 | 7–15 | 11–11–2 | 9–13 | 13–9 | 17–5 | — | 10–12–1 |
| Washington | 11–11–1 | 10–12–1 | 13–9–1 | 8–14 | 7–15–1 | 15–6–1 | 12–10–1 | — |

=== Roster ===
1916 Chicago White Sox
Roster
| Pitchers: Joe Benz; Eddie Cicotte; Dave Danforth; Red Faber; Reb Russell; Jim Scott; Ed Walsh; Lefty Williams; Mellie Wolfgang | Catchers: Jack Lapp; Byrd Lynn; Ray Schalk; Infielders: Eddie Collins; Jack Fournier; Ziggy Hasbrook; Fred McMullin; George Moriarty; Jack Ness; Zeb Terry; Fritz Von Kolnitz; Buck Weaver; Cy Wright | Outfielders: Shano Collins; Happy Felsch; Joe Jackson; Nemo Leibold; Eddie Murphy; Other positions: Joe Fautsch; Ted Jourdan; Ray Shook | Manager: Pants Rowland; Coaches: Kid Gleason |

== Player stats ==
=== Batting ===
==== Starters by position ====
Note: Pos = Position; G = Games played; AB = At bats; H = Hits; Avg. = Batting average; HR = Home runs; RBI = Runs batted in

| Pos | Player | G | AB | H | Avg. | HR | RBI |
|---|---|---|---|---|---|---|---|
| C | Ray Schalk | 129 | 410 | 95 | .232 | 0 | 41 |
| 1B | Jack Fournier | 105 | 313 | 75 | .240 | 3 | 44 |
| 2B | Eddie Collins | 155 | 545 | 168 | .308 | 0 | 52 |
| SS | Zeb Terry | 94 | 269 | 51 | .190 | 0 | 17 |
| 3B | Buck Weaver | 151 | 582 | 132 | .227 | 3 | 38 |
| OF | Joe Jackson | 155 | 592 | 202 | .341 | 3 | 78 |
| OF | Happy Felsch | 146 | 546 | 164 | .300 | 7 | 70 |
| OF | Shano Collins | 143 | 527 | 128 | .243 | 0 | 42 |

==== Other batters ====
Note: G = Games played; AB = At bats; H = Hits; Avg. = Batting average; HR = Home runs; RBI = Runs batted in

| Player | G | AB | H | Avg. | HR | RBI |
|---|---|---|---|---|---|---|
| Jack Ness | 75 | 258 | 69 | .267 | 1 | 34 |
| Fred McMullin | 68 | 187 | 48 | .257 | 0 | 10 |
| Eddie Murphy | 51 | 105 | 22 | .210 | 0 | 4 |
| Jack Lapp | 40 | 101 | 21 | .208 | 0 | 7 |
| Nemo Leibold | 45 | 82 | 20 | .244 | 0 | 13 |
| Fritz Von Kolnitz | 24 | 44 | 10 | .227 | 0 | 7 |
| Byrd Lynn | 31 | 40 | 9 | .225 | 0 | 3 |
| Cy Wright | 8 | 18 | 0 | .000 | 0 | 0 |
| Ziggy Hasbrook | 9 | 8 | 1 | .125 | 0 | 0 |
| George Moriarty | 7 | 5 | 1 | .200 | 0 | 0 |
| Ted Jourdan | 3 | 2 | 0 | .000 | 0 | 0 |
| Joe Fautsch | 1 | 1 | 0 | .000 | 0 | 0 |
| Ray Shook | 1 | 0 | 0 | ---- | 0 | 0 |

=== Pitching ===
==== Starting pitchers ====
Note: G = Games pitched; IP = Innings pitched; W = Wins; L = Losses; ERA = Earned run average; SO = Strikeouts

| Player | G | IP | W | L | ERA | SO |
|---|---|---|---|---|---|---|
| Red Faber | 35 | 205.1 | 17 | 9 | 2.02 | 87 |

==== Other pitchers ====
Note: G = Games pitched; IP = Innings pitched; W = Wins; L = Losses; ERA = Earned run average; SO = Strikeouts

| Player | G | IP | W | L | ERA | SO |
|---|---|---|---|---|---|---|
| Reb Russell | 56 | 264.1 | 18 | 11 | 2.42 | 112 |
| Lefty Williams | 43 | 224.1 | 13 | 7 | 2.89 | 138 |
| Eddie Cicotte | 44 | 187.0 | 15 | 7 | 1.78 | 91 |
| Jim Scott | 32 | 165.1 | 7 | 14 | 2.72 | 71 |
| Joe Benz | 28 | 142.0 | 9 | 5 | 2.03 | 57 |
| Mellie Wolfgang | 27 | 127.0 | 4 | 6 | 1.98 | 36 |
| Dave Danforth | 28 | 93.2 | 6 | 5 | 3.27 | 49 |
| Ed Walsh | 2 | 3.1 | 0 | 1 | 2.70 | 3 |

== Awards and honors ==
=== League top ten finishers ===
Eddie Cicotte

- #2 in AL in ERA (1.78)

Joe Jackson

- #2 in AL in slugging percentage (.495)
- #3 in AL in batting average (.341)
