= Sam Zoldak =

American baseball player (1918–1966)

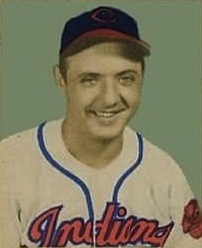
- Zoldak's 1949 Bowman Gum baseball card
- Pitcher
- Born: December 8, 1918; Brooklyn, New York, U.S.
- Died: August 25, 1966 (aged 47); New Hyde Park, New York, U.S.
- Batted: Left Threw: Left

MLB debut
- May 13, 1944, for the St. Louis Browns

Last MLB appearance
- August 26, 1952, for the Philadelphia Athletics

MLB statistics
- Win–loss record: 43–53
- Earned run average: 3.54
- Strikeouts: 207
- Stats at Baseball Reference

Teams
- St. Louis Browns (1944–1948); Cleveland Indians (1948–1950); Philadelphia Athletics (1951–1952)

Career highlights and awards
- World Series champion (1948)

Samuel Walter Zoldak, nicknamed Sad Sam, (December 8, 1918 – August 25, 1966) was an American professional baseball pitcher. He played in Major League Baseball (MLB) for nine seasons in the American League with the St. Louis Browns, Cleveland Indians, and Philadelphia Athletics. In 250 career games, Zoldak pitched 929 1/3 innings and posted a win–loss record of 43–53, with 30 complete games, five shutouts, and a 3.54 earned run average (ERA).

Although an average hitting pitcher in his major league career, posting a .175 batting average (50-for-286) with just 16 runs and 11 RBIs, he was a very good fielding pitcher, posting a .984 fielding percentage with only four errors in 258 total chances.

Born and raised in Brooklyn, New York, Zoldak began his professional career in the low-level minor leagues, working his way up despite being released from his first team. The St. Louis Browns acquired him in 1944 and placed him on their major league roster. He debuted on May 23, and spent the next four years as a spot starter, working both as a starting pitcher and relief pitcher. He was traded to the Cleveland Indians in 1948, and helped lead the team to the 1948 World Series. After two more years with Cleveland, he was traded to the Philadelphia Athletics, the organization he originally started with, and played two seasons there. After a short minor league stint in 1953, he retired from the game, and died in 1966.

== Early life and career ==
Zoldak, of Polish descent, was born on December 8, 1918, in Brooklyn, New York. He was raised by his mother, and worked at her confectionery shop, both while he was growing up and during the baseball offseason. He attended Eastern District High School and took up the game of baseball at McCarren Park, as his high school did not have a baseball team. He transferred from Eastern District to Textile High School where he swam competitively.

He began his professional career with the Palatka Azaleas in 1938, and threw 13 innings in two games. He was released afterwards, and played college baseball for the Fordham Rams baseball team while also playing some semi-professional baseball for a team in Cedarhurst, New York. Zoldak was signed by Philadelphia Athletics owner Connie Mack before the 1941 season, ending his college baseball career and restarting his professional one.

In 1941, Zoldak played for the Selma Cloverleafs and Williamsport Grays, pitching in 12 combined games. The following season, he spent the full year with Williamsport. In 32 games, he won and lost 11 each, and finished the year with an ERA of 2.54 in 177 innings pitched. The following year, he remained in the Eastern League with the Elmira Pioneers due to the Williamsport team choosing not to field a team until the conclusion of World War II. In 36 games for Elmira, Zoldak won 20 games, lost 11, and had a 2.73 ERA in 244 innings pitched.

== Major league career ==
On February 17, 1944, Zoldak was traded along with Barney Lutz to the St. Louis Browns for Frankie Hayes, as the Athletics wanted a veteran to add to their roster, while the Browns wanted the two prospects as they were classified as 4-F, and would be available to the team for the duration of the war. He impressed the Browns coaching staff in spring training, and as a result was named to the opening day roster. Zoldak made his major league debut on May 13, and was used as a reliever during his first season, pitching in 18 games and earning an ERA of 3.72. The Browns made it to the 1944 World Series, but Zoldak did not see any action. He played in 26 games during the 1945 season, earning a 3–2 record with an ERA of 3.36. In his final appearance of the season on September 29 against the Cleveland Indians, he was given the opportunity to start a game opposite Bob Feller. In a six-inning game shortened by rain, Zoldak and the Browns won, 2–1.

Entering the 1946 season, manager Luke Sewell was reluctant to turn Zoldak into a starter, but eventually gave him the nod. His first two starts were both victories, one of which was a complete game shutout against the Chicago White Sox, which gave him credit for three of the Browns' first eight wins of the season. He pitched in 35 games over the season, 21 of them starts, and ended the year with a 3.43 ERA, a 9–11 record, and a career-high 51 strikeouts. Unlike the previous season, Zoldak was slow to start in 1947, not winning his first game until June 22 against the Washington Senators. He finished the season similar statistically to 1946: he played in 35 games and started 19, and had a record of 9–10 and a 3.47 ERA. During the offseason, Cleveland Indians owner Bill Veeck offered $100,000 for Zoldak, but were turned down, and he remained on the Browns to begin the 1948 season. Zoldak was projected to be the team's opening day starting pitcher against the Cleveland Indians, who had planned for him; instead he was used in relief and Fred Sanford was named the starter the day of the game.

After spending the first two months of the season with the Browns, where he went 2–4 record in 11 games, he was traded to the Cleveland Indians on June 15, 1948, who added pitcher Bill Kennedy to go with their original offer of $100,000, a move which Bill Veeck called "a case of begging for him on our knees." For the Indians, he served both as a relief pitcher and a fifth starting pitcher as he did with the Browns. On August 18, he faced his former team, and threw a complete-game shutout, defeating the Browns, 3–0. A month later, he won two back-to-back games against the Detroit Tigers, both in extra innings. During his time with the Indians, he went 9–6 with a 2.81 ERA in 23 games, 12 of them starts. He was on the Indians roster for the 1948 World Series and warmed up for all six games in the Indians' bullpen, but was never called upon to pitch; he was one of two on the roster who did not see any action in the World Series.

Zoldak was moved to a relief role full-time for the 1949 season due to a lack of depth with the departures of Ed Klieman and Russ Christopher. On July 27, Zoldak managed to hit his only career home run against the New York Yankees off Ed Lopat. However, the game was rained out, and the only home run of his career was erased. In 27 games that season, Zoldak had a 1–2 record with a 4.25 ERA. Zoldak had struggled in spring training the prior year due to both being out of shape and a lack of pitching control, but was impressive enough in 1950 after losing the weight and regaining his control that manager Lou Boudreau decided to put him in the starting rotation to begin the year. He pitched poorly in his first starts, and was placed back in the bullpen for the rest of the year; Indians management considered demoting him to the minor leagues, and would have been sent to the San Diego Padres in May if not for the intervention of Johnny Berardino, who wanted to play on the west coast and agreed to a demotion instead. Zoldak spent the full season with Cleveland, and had a 4–2 record and a 3.96 ERA in 33 games.

== Later life ==
As the 1951 season began, Zoldak was part of a three-way trade. On April 30, 1951, he was traded to the Philadelphia Athletics along with Ray Murray, which also involved the Chicago White Sox. Manager Jimmy Dykes brought Zoldak onto the Athletics with the intention of putting him in the starting rotation in place of Lou Brissie, who had been sent to the Indians in the same trade. On July 15, Zoldak pitched a one-hitter against the Chicago White Sox in what was called "the greatest game of his career", and followed that up with a complete game against the Indians, allowing one run in nearly ten innings of work. In 26 games for the Athletics, 18 of them starts, he had a 6–10 record and a 3.16 ERA. Before the 1952 season began, manager Dykes planned on giving Zoldak more rest between starts to try to maximize what he could provide for the team, as he had been growing tired when overused during the season. Zoldak pitched in 16 games in 1952, and had a 0–6 record and a 4.06 ERA.

On February 2, 1953, the Athletics released Zoldak unconditionally, considering him expandable due to the team having 20 pitchers on their spring training roster. He was given a tryout with the Toronto Maple Leafs, but after salary negotiations fell through he signed with the Seattle Rainiers of the Pacific Coast League. Zoldak pitched briefly for the Rainiers, appearing in two games before being released by the team; he retired from the game after his release. After retiring, he became a box office man, working at sporting events as well as shows on Broadway. Zoldak, who never married, died of a pulmonary embolism while battling lung cancer on August 25, 1966, leaving behind his mother and three siblings, and is buried in the Cemetery of the Holy Rood in Westbury, New York.
