= 1916 Detroit Tigers season =

Major League Baseball season

1916 Detroit Tigers
- League: American League
- Ballpark: Navin Field
- City: Detroit
- Record: 87–67 (.565)
- League place: 3rd
- Owners: William H. Yawkey and Frank Navin
- Managers: Hughie Jennings

The 1916 Detroit Tigers season was a season in American baseball. The team finished third in the American League with a record of 87–67, 4 games behind the Boston Red Sox.

== Regular season ==
=== Season standings ===
American League
Team	W	L	Pct.	GB	Home	Road
Boston Red Sox	91	63	.591	—	49‍–‍28	42‍–‍35
Chicago White Sox	89	65	.578	2	49‍–‍28	40‍–‍37
Detroit Tigers	87	67	.565	4	49‍–‍28	38‍–‍39
New York Yankees	80	74	.519	11	46‍–‍31	34‍–‍43
St. Louis Browns	79	75	.513	12	45‍–‍32	34‍–‍43
Cleveland Indians	77	77	.500	14	44‍–‍33	33‍–‍44
Washington Senators	76	77	.497	14½	49‍–‍28	27‍–‍49
Philadelphia Athletics	36	117	.235	54½	23‍–‍53	13‍–‍64

=== Record vs. opponents ===
1916 American League record Sources:
Team	BOS	CWS	CLE	DET	NYY	PHA	SLB	WSH
Boston	—	14–8	15–7	14–8	11–11	16–6	10–12–1	11–11–1
Chicago	8–14	—	13–9	13–9	10–12	18–4	15–7	12–10–1
Cleveland	7–15	9–13	—	11–11	12–10	18–4	11–11–2	9–13–1
Detroit	8–14	9–13	11–11	—	14–8–1	18–4	13–9	14–8
New York	11–11	12–10	10–12	8–14–1	—	15–7	9–13	15–7–1
Philadelphia	6–16	4–18	4–18	4–18	7–15	—	5–17	6–15–1
St. Louis	12–10–1	7–15	11–11–2	9–13	13–9	17–5	—	10–12–1
Washington	11–11–1	10–12–1	13–9–1	8–14	7–15–1	15–6–1	12–10–1	—

=== Roster ===
1916 Detroit Tigers
Roster
Pitchers: George Boehler; Bernie Boland; Harry Coveleski; George Cunningham; Hooks Dauss; Jean Dubuc; Howard Ehmke; Eric Erickson; Earl Hamilton; Bill James; Deacon Jones; Grover Lowdermilk; Bill McTigue; Willie Mitchell	Catchers: Del Baker; Red McKee; Tubby Spencer; Oscar Stanage; Billy Sullivan; Infielders: George Burns; Donie Bush; Ben Dyer; Babe Ellison; Frank Fuller; George Maisel; Ossie Vitt; Ralph Young	Outfielders: Ty Cobb; Sam Crawford; Jack Dalton; George Harper; Harry Heilmann; Marty Kavanagh; Bobby Veach	Manager: Hughie Jennings; Coaches: Jimmy Burke; Deacon McGuire

== Player stats ==
=== Batting ===
==== Starters by position ====
Note: Pos = Position; G = Games played; AB = At bats; H = Hits; Avg. = Batting average; HR = Home runs; RBI = Runs batted in

Pos	Player	G	AB	H	Avg.	HR	RBI
C	Oscar Stanage	94	291	69	.237	0	34
1B	George Burns	135	479	137	.286	4	73
2B	Ralph Young	153	528	139	.263	1	42
SS	Donie Bush	145	550	124	.225	0	33
3B	Ossie Vitt	153	597	135	.226	0	42
OF	Sam Crawford	100	322	92	.286	0	47
OF	Ty Cobb	145	543	201	.370	5	68
OF	Bobby Veach	150	566	173	.306	3	89

==== Other batters ====
Note: G = Games played; AB = At bats; H = Hits; Avg. = Batting average; HR = Home runs; RBI = Runs batted in

Player	G	AB	H	Avg.	HR	RBI
Harry Heilmann	136	451	127	.282	2	77
Del Baker	61	98	15	.153	0	8
Marty Kavanagh	58	78	11	.141	0	4
Red McKee	32	76	16	.211	0	6
George Harper	44	56	9	.161	0	5
Tubby Spencer	19	54	20	.370	1	9
Ben Dyer	4	14	4	.286	0	1
Jack Dalton	8	11	2	.182	0	0
Frank Fuller	20	10	1	.100	0	1
Babe Ellison	2	7	1	.143	0	1
George Maisel	8	5	0	.000	0	0
Billy Sullivan	1	0	0	----	0	0

=== Pitching ===
==== Starting pitchers ====
Note: G = Games pitched; IP = Innings pitched; W = Wins; L = Losses; ERA = Earned run average; SO = Strikeouts

Player	G	IP	W	L	ERA	SO
Harry Coveleski	44	324.1	21	11	1.97	108
Hooks Dauss	39	238.2	19	12	3.21	95
Willie Mitchell	23	127.2	7	5	3.31	60
Earl Hamilton	5	37.1	1	2	2.65	7
Howard Ehmke	5	37.1	3	1	3.13	15

==== Other pitchers ====
Note: G = Games pitched; IP = Innings pitched; W = Wins; L = Losses; ERA = Earned run average; SO = Strikeouts

Player	G	IP	W	L	ERA	SO
Jean Dubuc	36	170.1	10	10	2.96	40
Bill James	30	151.2	8	12	3.68	61
George Cunningham	35	150.1	7	10	2.75	68
Bernie Boland	46	130.1	10	3	3.94	59
George Boehler	5	13.1	1	1	4.74	8

==== Relief pitchers ====
Note: G = Games pitched; W = Wins; L = Losses; SV = Saves; ERA = Earned run average; SO = Strikeouts

Player	G	W	L	SV	ERA	SO
Eric Erickson	8	0	0	0	2.81	7
Bill McTigue	3	0	0	0	5.06	1
Deacon Jones	1	0	0	0	2.57	2
Grover Lowdermilk	1	0	0	0	0.00	0
