= List of St. Louis Browns Opening Day starting pitchers =

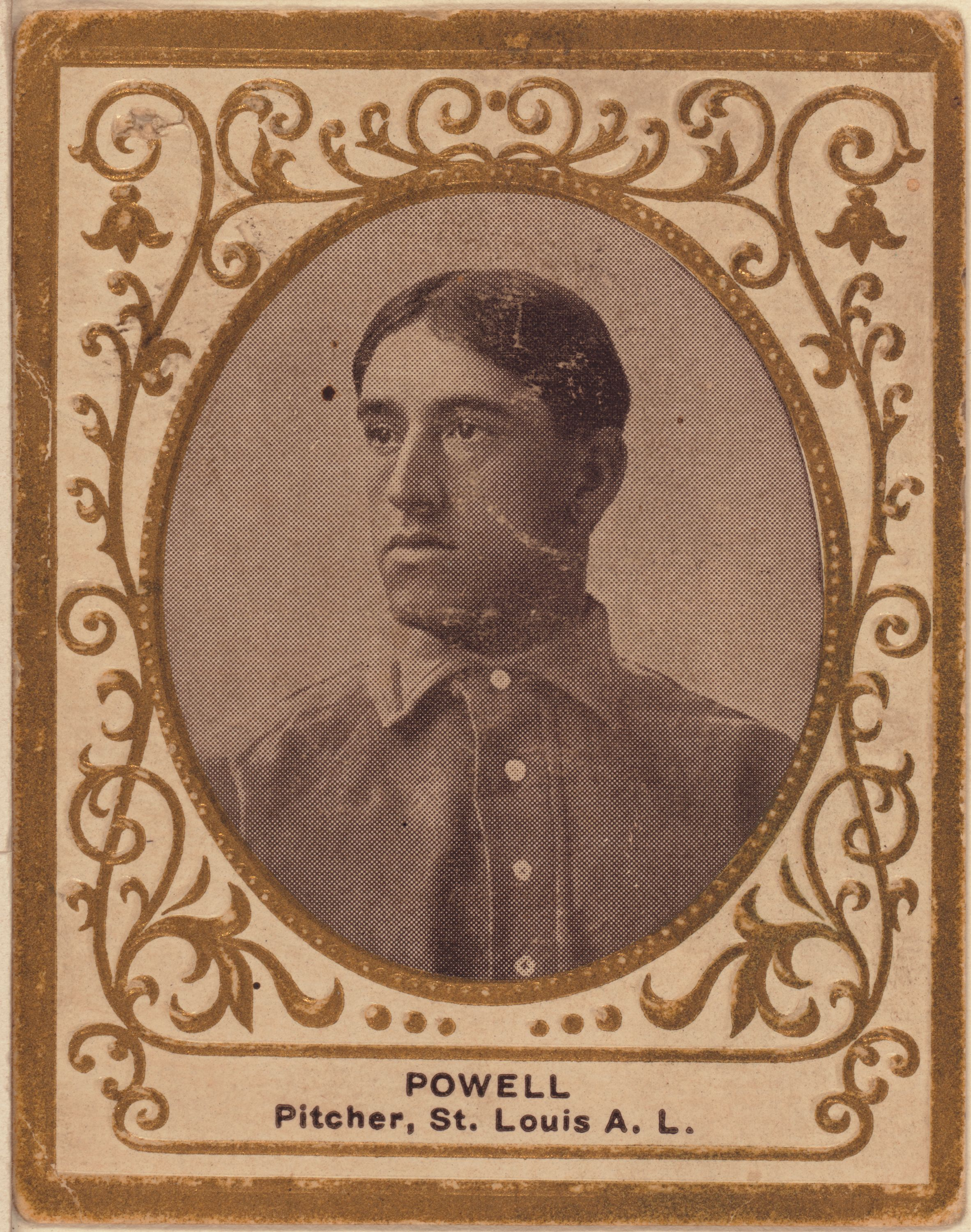
Jack Powell, the Browns' Opening Day starting pitcher in 1909 and 1911

The St. Louis Browns were a Major League Baseball team that played in St. Louis, Missouri from 1902 through 1953. The franchise moved from Milwaukee, Wisconsin, where it was known as the Milwaukee Brewers, after the 1901 season. It moved to Baltimore, Maryland after the 1953 season, where it became known as the Baltimore Orioles. The Browns played their home games at Sportsman's Park. They played in the American League. The first game of the new baseball season for a team is played on Opening Day, and being named the Opening Day starter is an honor, which is often given to the player who is expected to lead the pitching staff that season, though there are various strategic reasons why a team's best pitcher might not start on Opening Day. The Browns used 35 different Opening Day starting pitchers in their 52 seasons. The Browns won 26 of those games against 25 losses in those Opening Day starts. They also played one tie game.

Urban Shocker and Ned Garver had the most Opening Day starts for the Browns, with four apiece. Harry Howell, Carl Weilman, Sam Gray and Bobo Newsom each had three Opening Day starts for the Browns. The other pitchers with multiple Opening Day starts for the Browns were Red Donahue, Jack Powell and Lefty Stewart. The Browns won three of both Shocker's and Garver's Opening Day starts, more than any other Browns' pitchers. The Browns lost two of Weilman's Opening Day starts. They did not lose more than one Opening Day game started by any other pitcher.

Although over their history the Browns won only one more Opening Day game than they lost, they did have a nine-game winning streak in Opening Day games from 1937 through 1945. That winning streak immediately followed their longest losing streak in Opening Day games, which was five losses from 1932 through 1936.

The Browns' first game in St. Louis was played on April 23, 1902 against the Cleveland Indians at Sportsman's Park. Their Opening Day starting pitcher for that game was Red Donahue. The Browns won the game 5–2. The Browns advanced to the World Series only once during their time in St. Louis, in 1944. In their only postseason appearance, they lost the 1944 World Series to their Sportsman's Park cotennant St. Louis Cardinals, four games to two. Jack Kramer was the Browns Opening Day starting pitcher that season. The Browns won that game.

The franchise's only major league Opening Day game as the Milwaukee Brewers was played on April 25, 1901 against the Detroit Tigers in Detroit. Pink Hawley was the Brewers' Opening Day starting pitcher. The Brewers lost the game by a score of 14–13.

== Key ==
Season	Each year is linked to an article about that particular Browns season.
W	Win
L	Loss
T	Tie game; no decision to starting pitcher
ND (W)	No decision by starting pitcher; Browns won game
ND (L)	No decision by starting pitcher; Browns lost game
(W)	Browns won game; no information on starting pitcher's decision
(L)	Browns lost game; no information on starting pitcher's decision
(#)	Number of appearances as Opening Day starter
**	AL Champions

== Pitchers ==
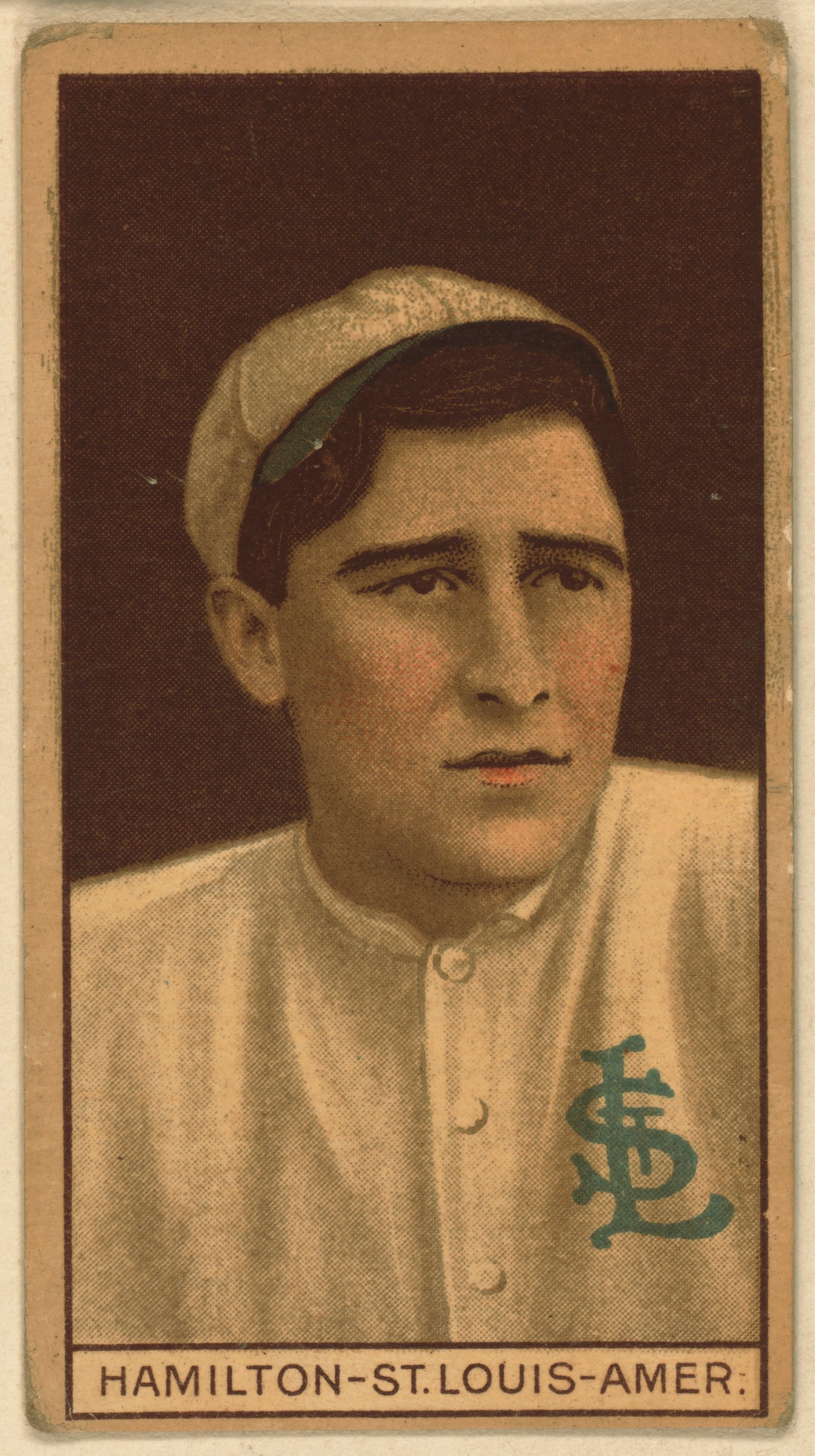
Earl Hamilton was the Browns' Opening Day starting pitcher in 1917.

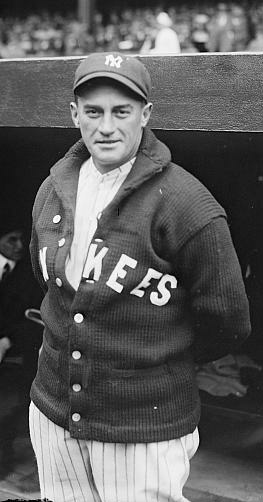
Urban Shocker, shown here with the New York Yankees, made four Opening Day starts for the Browns.

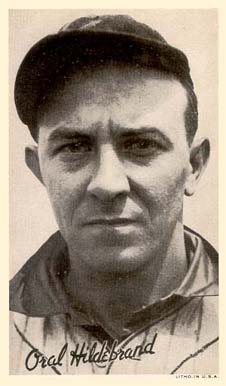
Oral Hildebrand pitched Opening Day for the Browns in 1937, his first season with the club.

Year	Pitcher	Decision	Opponent	Location	Reference
1901^{[a]}	Pink Hawley	(L)	Detroit Tigers	Bennett Park	
1902	Red Donahue	(W)	Cleveland Indians	Sportsman's Park	
1903	Red Donahue (2)	(L)	Chicago White Sox	Sportsman's Park	
1904	Ed Siever	(L)	Detroit Tigers	Sportsman's Park	
1905	Harry Howell	(W)	Chicago White Sox	South Side Park	
1906	Harry Howell (2)	(L)	Cleveland Indians	Sportsman's Park	
1907	Harry Howell (3)	(W)	Chicago White Sox	Sportsman's Park	
1908	Barney Pelty	(W)	Cleveland Indians	League Park	
1909	Jack Powell	(L)	Cleveland Indians	Sportsman's Park	
1910	Bill Grahame	(L)	Chicago White Sox	South Side Park	
1911	Jack Powell (2)	(W)	Cleveland Indians	Sportsman's Park	
1912	Joe Lake	(L)	Chicago White Sox	Comiskey Park	
1913	Carl Weilman	(W)	Detroit Tigers	Sportsman's Park	
1914	Carl Weilman (2)	(L)	Detroit Tigers	Tiger Stadium	
1915	Carl Weilman (3)	(L)	Chicago White Sox	Sportsman's Park	
1916	Bob Groom	(L)	Cleveland Indians	League Park	
1917	Earl Hamilton	(L)	Chicago White Sox	Sportsman's Park	
1918	Grover Lowdermilk	(W)	Chicago White Sox	Comiskey Park	
1919	Dave Davenport	(L)	Chicago White Sox	Sportsman's Park	
1920	Allen Sothoron	(L)	Cleveland Indians	League Park	
1921	Urban Shocker	(W)	Cleveland Indians	Sportsman's Park	
1922	Urban Shocker (2)	(W)	Chicago White Sox	Comiskey Park	
1923	Urban Shocker (3)	(L)	Detroit Tigers	Sportsman's Park	
1924	Urban Shocker (4)	(W)	Chicago White Sox	Comiskey Park	
1925	Joe Bush	(L)	Cleveland Indians	Sportsman's Park	
1926	Milt Gaston	(L)	Chicago White Sox	Comiskey Park	
1927	Tom Zachary	T	Detroit Tigers	Sportsman's Park	
1928	Sam Gray	(W)	Detroit Tigers	Tiger Stadium	
1929	Sam Gray (2)	(W)	Chicago White Sox	Sportsman's Park	
1930	Sam Gray (3)	(L)	Detroit Tigers	Tiger Stadium	
1931	Lefty Stewart	(W)	Detroit Tigers	Sportsman's Park	
1932	Lefty Stewart (2)	(L)	Chicago White Sox	Comiskey Park	
1933	Bump Hadley	(L)	Chicago White Sox	Sportsman's Park	
1934	George Blaeholder	(L)	Cleveland Indians	League Park	
1935	Bobo Newsom	(L)	Cleveland Indians	Sportsman's Park	
1936	Ivy Andrews	(L)	Chicago White Sox	Comiskey Park	
1937	Oral Hildebrand	(W)	Chicago White Sox	Sportsman's Park	
1938	Bobo Newsom (2)	(W)	Cleveland Indians	League Park	
1939	Bobo Newsom (3)	(W)	Chicago White Sox	Comiskey Park	
1940	Slick Coffman	(W)	Detroit Tigers	Tiger Stadium	
1941	Elden Auker	(W)	Detroit Tigers	Sportsman's Park	
1942	Bob Muncrief	(W)	Chicago White Sox	Comiskey Park	
1943	Al Hollingsworth	(W)	Chicago White Sox	Sportsman's Park	
1944**	Jack Kramer	(W)	Detroit Tigers	Tiger Stadium	
1945	Sig Jakucki	(W)	Detroit Tigers	Sportsman's Park	
1946	Nels Potter	(L)	Detroit Tigers	Tiger Stadium	
1947	Denny Galehouse	(L)	Detroit Tigers	Sportsman's Park	
1948	Fred Sanford	(L)	Cleveland Indians	Cleveland Stadium	
1949	Ned Garver	(W)	Cleveland Indians	Sportsman's Park	
1950	Ned Garver (2)	(W)	Chicago White Sox	Comiskey Park	
1951	Ned Garver (3)	(L)	Chicago White Sox	Sportsman's Park	
1952	Ned Garver (4)	(W)	Detroit Tigers	Tiger Stadium	
1953	Virgil Trucks	(W)	Detroit Tigers	Busch Stadium	

== Footnote ==
^{a} As the Milwaukee Brewers
