= Oral Hildebrand =

American baseball player (1907–1977)

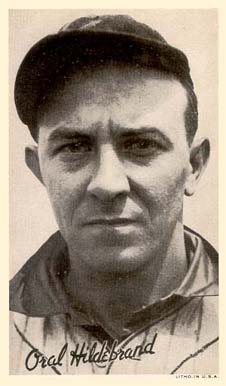
- Pitcher
- Born: April 7, 1907; Indianapolis, Indiana, U.S.
- Died: September 8, 1977 (aged 70); Southport, Indiana, U.S.
- Batted: Right Threw: Right

MLB debut
- September 8, 1931, for the Cleveland Indians

Last MLB appearance
- July 28, 1940, for the New York Yankees

MLB statistics
- Win–loss record: 83–78
- Earned run average: 4.35
- Strikeouts: 527
- Stats at Baseball Reference

Teams
- Cleveland Indians (1931–1936); St. Louis Browns (1937–1938); New York Yankees (1939–1940)

Career highlights and awards
- All-Star (1933); World Series champion (1939)

Oral Clyde Hildebrand (April 7, 1907 – September 8, 1977) was an American pitcher in Major League Baseball from 1931 to 1940. He played for the Cleveland Indians, St. Louis Browns, and New York Yankees.

== Early life ==
Hildebrand was born in Indianapolis, Indiana. He attended Butler University and was the starting center for the basketball team. He led Butler to the 1929 national collegiate championship, was the captain of the 1930 squad, and is in the Butler Hall of Fame.

== Baseball career ==
Hildebrand started his professional baseball career in 1930 with the American Association's Indianapolis Indians. In two seasons, he went just 14–18 but made it to the major leagues in late 1931.

Hildebrand broke into the Cleveland Indians' starting rotation in 1933. That season, he went 16–11, led the American League in shutouts with six, and was selected to the All-Star team. He pitched a one-hitter on April 26. From 1934 to 1936, he continued to pitch effectively for the Indians, going 30–28 in those years. Hildebrand also had several public disputes with manager Walter Johnson, which ended when Johnson was fired in 1935.

In 1937, Hildebrand was traded to the Browns in a blockbuster deal. He struggled in two seasons with St. Louis and was then traded again, to the Yankees. In 1939, he went 10–4 with a career-low 3.06 earned run average, helping the Yankees win the AL pennant. He started game 4 of the World Series and pitched four shutout innings, as the Yankees clinched the title.

Hildebrand went back to the minor leagues in 1941 and retired the following year.

== Later life ==
After his baseball career was over, Hildebrand became a tool and die maker for the Link-Belt Division of FMC Corporation. He retired in 1972.

Hildebrand died on September 7, 1977, at the age of 70. He was survived by his wife Frances and five children and was buried in the Forest Lawn Memory Gardens.

== See also ==
- List of Major League Baseball annual shutout leaders
- List of Cleveland Indians Opening Day starting pitchers
- List of St. Louis Browns Opening Day starting pitchers
