= Ollie Welf =

American baseball player (1889–1967)

- Pinch runner
- Born: January 17, 1889; Cleveland, Ohio
- Died: June 15, 1967 (aged 78); Cleveland, Ohio
- Batted: Right Threw: Left

MLB debut
- August 30, 1916, for the Cleveland Indians

Last MLB appearance
- August 30, 1916, for the Cleveland Indians

MLB statistics
- Plate appearances: 0
- Runs: 0
- Stats at Baseball Reference

Teams
- Cleveland Indians (1916)

Oliver Henry Welf (January 17, 1889 – June 15, 1967) was a Major League Baseball player who played for one season. He made one appearance for the Cleveland Indians as a pinch runner on August 30 during the 1916 Cleveland Indians season. He was an outfielder during his minor league career.

Welf attended Glenville High School in Cleveland where he once threw a no-hitter against Central High School.
