= Roy Hamey =

American Sporting Executive

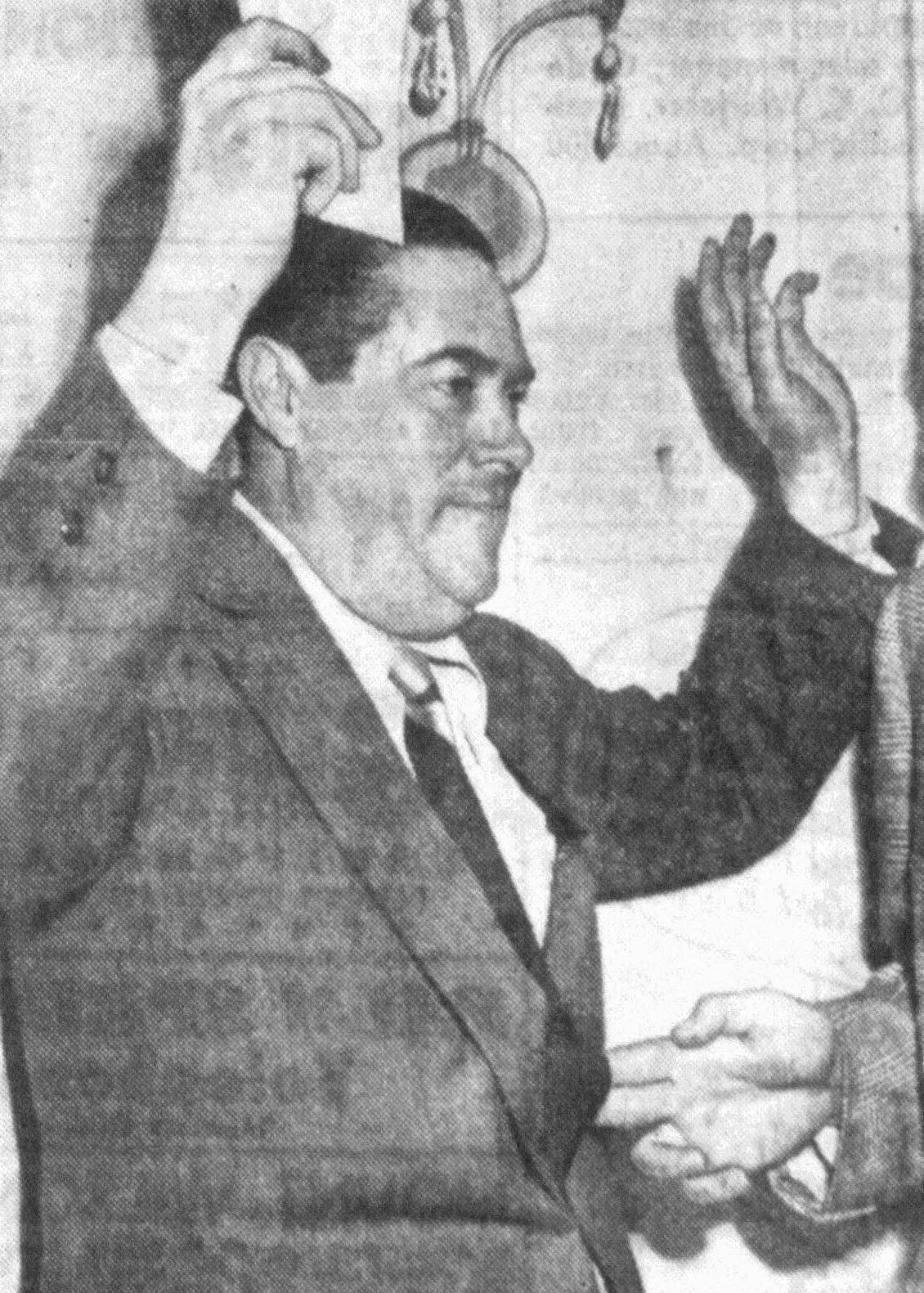
- Hamey, circa 1950
- Born: June 9, 1902; Havana, Illinois, U.S.
- Died: December 14, 1983 (aged 81); Tucson, Arizona, U.S.
- Occupations: Baseball executive, scout
- Years active: 1925–1983

Henry Roy Hamey (June 9, 1902 – December 14, 1983) was an American front-office executive in Major League Baseball (MLB). A longtime employee of the New York Yankees, he was appointed the club's general manager in November 1960. Inheriting a pennant-winner from his predecessor, George Weiss, he maintained the club's dynasty by producing three additional American League champions and two World Series champions in three full seasons before retiring in the autumn of 1963. Hamey also spent nine years as the general manager of two National League franchises, the Pittsburgh Pirates and Philadelphia Phillies, during the period between 1947 and 1958.

== Minor league career ==
A native of Havana, Illinois, Hamey's early employment included working in an office job with Standard Oil of Indiana and managing vaudeville theaters.

He entered minor league baseball in 1925 as business manager of Class B Springfield of the Three–I League. In 1934, Hamey joined the Yankees as front office boss of their Class A Binghamton Triplets club in the New York–Pennsylvania League. He arrived as George Weiss, then director of the Yankees' farm system, was building the team’s first minor league organization, modeled off the St. Louis Cardinals' minor league. After Hamey's success at Binghamton, Weiss transferred him to business manager of one of New York's two highest-tier farm clubs, the Kansas City Blues of the top-level (then called Double-A) American Association.

In 1945, Larry MacPhail, former general manager of the Cincinnati Reds and Brooklyn Dodgers, returned from United States Army service in World War II and formed an ownership syndicate that purchased the Yankees from the estate of Jacob Ruppert. MacPhail simultaneously installed himself as president and general manager, effectively blocking the career paths of both Weiss and Hamey. While Weiss chose to remain as New York's farm director and vice president, Hamey departed to become president of the American Association.

== General Manager in Pittsburgh and Philadelphia ==
At the close of the 1946 season, Hamey was rewarded with his first major league general manager portfolio as front-office chief of the Pittsburgh Pirates, hired by the Pirates' new ownership group led by Frank E. McKinney. Hamey recruited Billy Meyer out of the Yankee minor league system as the Bucs' manager and acquired several players, such as pitchers Tiny Bonham and Bob Chesnes and future Hall of Famer Hank Greenberg, to surround slugging outfielder Ralph Kiner, who led (or co-led) the National League in home runs every year between 1946 and 1952. But the Pirates did not build a successful farm system and, apart from a first-division finish in 1948, the team was an also-ran. In December 1950, the Pirates replaced Hamey with ousted Brooklyn president Branch Rickey.

Hamey then returned to the Yankees, where Weiss had been promoted to general manager in October 1947 after MacPhail's partners, Dan Topping and Del Webb, bought him out. Hamey served as Weiss's top assistant from 1951 through mid-April 1954.

On April 16 of that year, he joined the Philadelphia Phillies as general manager, effectively succeeding owner Robert R. M. Carpenter Jr., who was functioning as the team's GM-without-portfolio. The team saw mixed results under Hamey’s leadership. The Phillies could not repeat their 1950 "Whiz Kid" success, as key players aged. Philadelphia did introduce talented young pitchers like 1957 National League Rookie of the Year Jack Sanford and 1958 All-Star Turk Farrell. However, Hamey traded away Sanford, a future 24-game winner, after the 1958 season. Meanwhile, Farrell became more noted for his rowdy behavior off of the field than his pitching. While the Phils hovered around the .500 level, Hamey did bring to the club its first African-American player, infielder John Irvin Kennedy, who played five games in 1957. In a National League increasingly dominated by black players, the Phillies were the last club to integrate and only two American League teams—the Detroit Tigers and Boston Red Sox—were more steadfast in hewing to the baseball color line.

In 1958, however, the Phillies' fortunes began to decline precipitously. The club finished last in the National League, and Hamey lost his job. He was replaced in January 1959, by John Quinn, recruited from the Milwaukee Braves. Hamey then rejoined Weiss and the Yankees as assistant general manager for the full seasons of 1959 and 1960.

== Yankees General Manager ==
After a seven-game loss of the 1960 World Series to the Pirates, the Yankees faced difficult decisions. Manager Casey Stengel was 70 years of age and blocking the path of 41-year-old Ralph Houk, one of his coaches and considered a top managing prospect. When Stengel would not retire, Topping and Webb fired him—or "discharged" him, as Stengel would say. Concurrently, the team also needed a succession plan for Weiss, then 66. In a somewhat controversial decision, the Yankees forced Weiss into a temporary retirement, and promoted the 58-year-old Hamey to general manager on November 3, 1960. Both Stengel and Weiss would, however, resurface a year later as the first manager and president of the expansion New York Mets.

Hamey faced numerous challenges in keeping the Yankees at the top of the American League. He presided over the team's participation in the first expansion draft in December 1960, brought up pitcher Roland Sheldon, a rookie standout, from the minors, and swung a number of deals during 1961 that added supporting players to a team that would win 109 games and easily defeat Cincinnati in the 1961 World Series. He tweaked the Yankee roster again during the offseason, and promoted eventual Rookie of the Year Tom Tresh and freshman pitcher Jim Bouton to the 1962 club, which took the AL pennant by five games and outlasted the San Francisco Giants in the World Series.

In 1963, Hamey added more youth in left-handed pitcher Al Downing and first baseman Joe Pepitone. He made room for Pepitone through a controversial trade, sending longtime Yankee first baseman Bill Skowron to the Los Angeles Dodgers for pitcher Stan Williams. Skowron struggled mightily in the NL during 1963, while the Yankees won 104 games and gained their fourth straight AL title. But in the 1963 World Series, the Dodgers humbled the Yanks in four straight games—the first time the team had ever been swept in a Fall Classic—with Skowron the batting star.

In the weeks following the 1963 season, Topping and Webb, perhaps paving the way for the Yankees' sale to CBS in 1964, decided to shake up the front office: Hamey retired as general manager to become a scout, Houk was promoted to GM to succeed him, and Yogi Berra, a player-coach in 1963, became the team's manager.

The Yankees averaged 103 regular season victories during Hamey's three-year GM tenure and brought up many mid-level players. But they were unable to adequately replace the team's aging superstars - Mickey Mantle, Roger Maris, Berra, Whitey Ford, Elston Howard, Bobby Richardson and Tony Kubek. After one last pennant in 1964, the Yankees were a mediocre team for eleven years until they entered the George Steinbrenner era.

== Later Life and Death ==
Hamey's last high-profile job in baseball occurred during the winter of 1969–70, when AL president Joe Cronin appointed him caretaker chief executive of the Seattle Pilots as the team struggled to find new ownership. He relinquished that responsibility and returned to his scouting job with the Yankees when the Pilots were purchased by Bud Selig and moved to Milwaukee for the 1970 season.

Roy Hamey lived in retirement in Tucson, Arizona. He died there of a heart attack at age 81 on December 14, 1983, and is buried in Mattoon, Illinois, at Dodge Grove Cemetery.

== See also ==
- 1961 New York Yankees season
- 1962 New York Yankees season
- 1963 New York Yankees season

| Preceded by George Trautman | American Association President; 1946 | Succeeded by Frank Lane |
| Preceded by Ray Kennedy | Pittsburgh Pirates General manager 1946–1950 | Succeeded by Branch Rickey |
| Preceded by Bob Carpenter | Philadelphia Phillies General manager 1954–1959 | Succeeded by John Quinn |
| Preceded by George Weiss | New York Yankees General manager 1960–1963 | Succeeded by Ralph Houk |
