= Red Gunkel =

American baseball player (1894–1954)

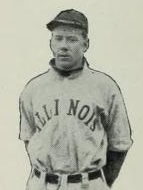
- Pitcher
- Born: April 15, 1894; Sheffield, Illinois
- Died: April 19, 1954 (aged 60); Chicago, Illinois
- Batted: Both Threw: Right

MLB debut
- June 18, 1916, for the Cleveland Indians

Last MLB appearance
- June 18, 1916, for the Cleveland Indians

MLB statistics
- Win–loss record: 0–0
- Innings pitched: 1.0
- Earned run average: 0.00
- Stats at Baseball Reference

Teams
- Cleveland Indians (1916)

Woodward William "Red" Gunkel (April 15, 1894 – April 19, 1954) was a Major League Baseball pitcher who appeared in one game for the Cleveland Indians during the 1916 season. He attended the University of Illinois at Urbana–Champaign.
