= 1916 Boston Red Sox season =

Major League Baseball season

1916 Boston Red Sox
- World Series champions American League champions
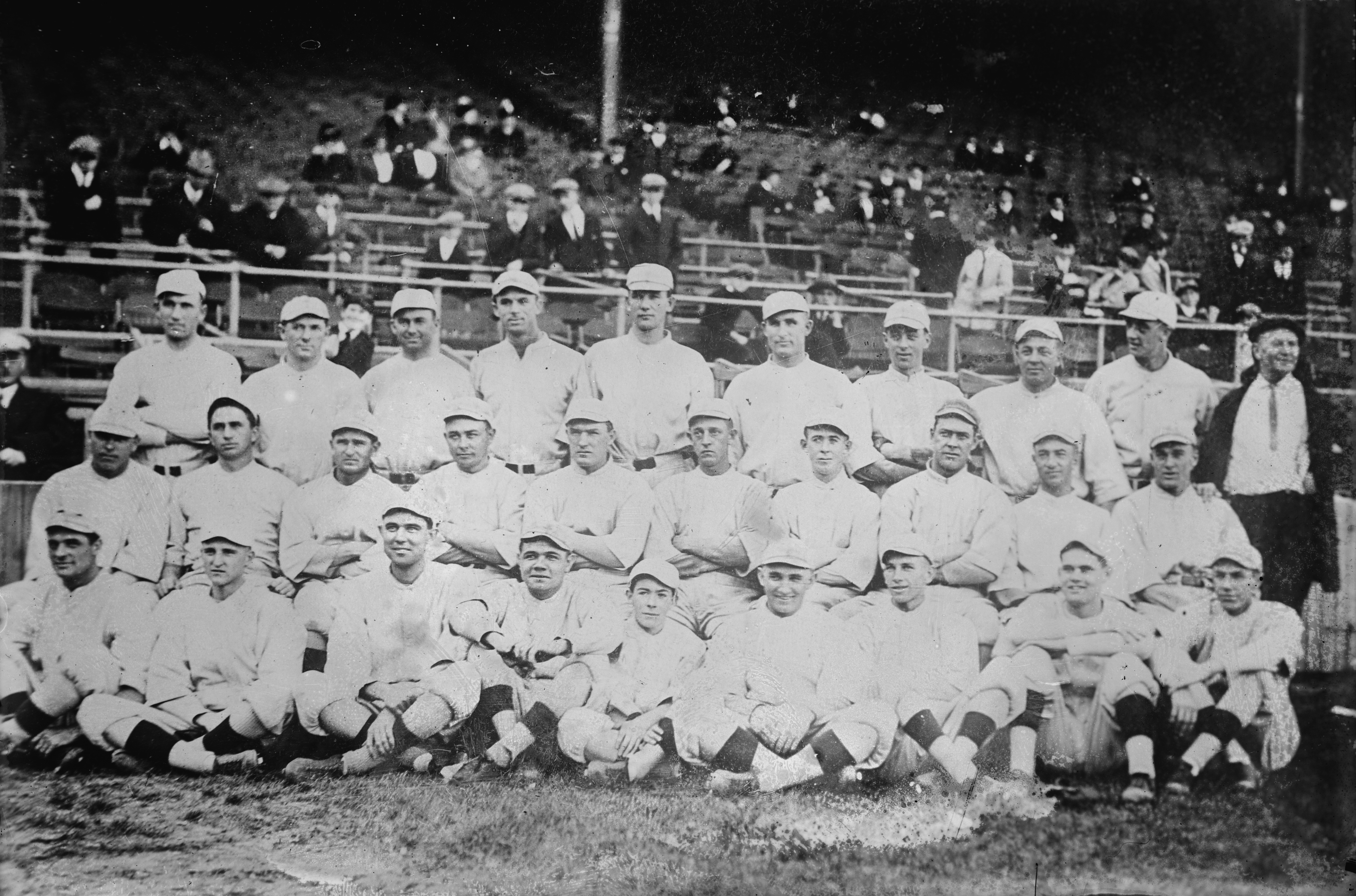
- 1916 Boston Red Sox team photo, with Babe Ruth fourth from left in bottom row
- League: American League
- Ballpark: Fenway Park
- City: Boston, Massachusetts
- Record: 91–63 (.591)
- League place: 1st
- Owners: Joseph Lannin
- Managers: Bill Carrigan
- Stats: ESPN.com; Baseball Reference

The 1916 Boston Red Sox season was the 16th season in the franchise's Major League Baseball history. The Red Sox finished first in the American League (AL) with a record of 91 wins and 63 losses. The team then faced the National League (NL) champion Brooklyn Robins in the 1916 World Series, which the Red Sox won in five games to capture the franchise's second consecutive and fourth overall World Series.

== Ballparks ==
While the Red Sox' home field was Fenway Park, their final two regular season games—a doubleheader against the Philadelphia Athletics—and their three home games of the World Series were played at Braves Field, due to its larger seating capacity.

Between the end of the regular season and the start of the World Series, Boston and Philadelphia played an exhibition game in Worcester, Massachusetts, on October 5. The game was played to raise money for a grave monument for former National League umpire John Gaffney, who had grown up in Worcester and died in 1913.

== Regular season ==
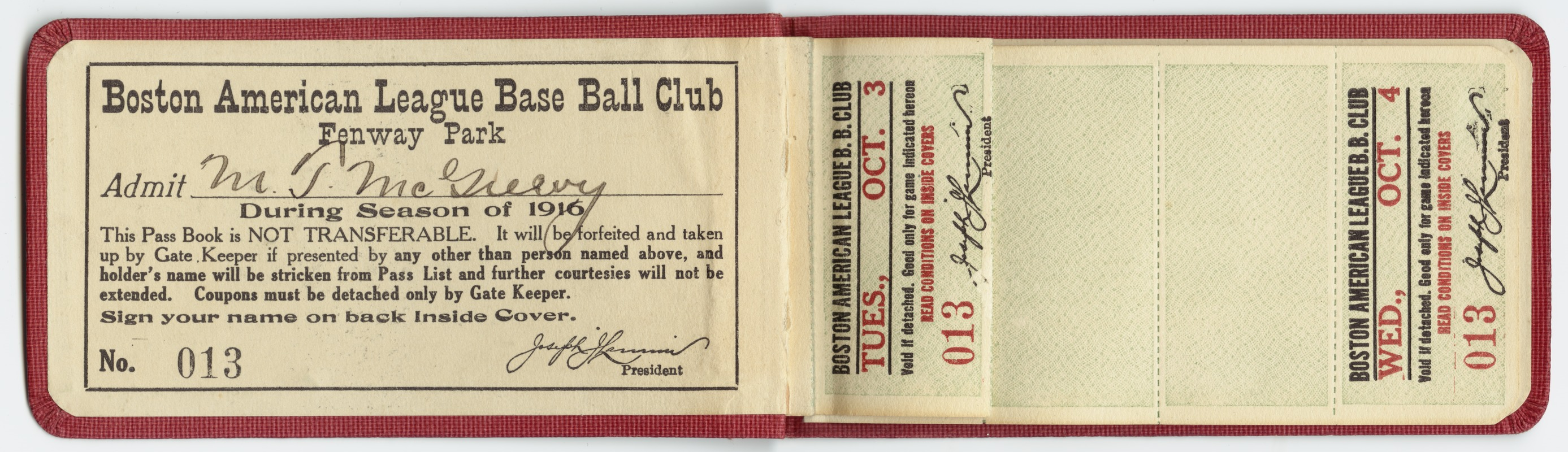
Passbook for the 1916 season

=== Season standings ===
American League
| Team | W | L | Pct. | GB | Home | Road |
|---|---|---|---|---|---|---|
| Boston Red Sox | 91 | 63 | .591 | — | 49‍–‍28 | 42‍–‍35 |
| Chicago White Sox | 89 | 65 | .578 | 2 | 49‍–‍28 | 40‍–‍37 |
| Detroit Tigers | 87 | 67 | .565 | 4 | 49‍–‍28 | 38‍–‍39 |
| New York Yankees | 80 | 74 | .519 | 11 | 46‍–‍31 | 34‍–‍43 |
| St. Louis Browns | 79 | 75 | .513 | 12 | 45‍–‍32 | 34‍–‍43 |
| Cleveland Indians | 77 | 77 | .500 | 14 | 44‍–‍33 | 33‍–‍44 |
| Washington Senators | 76 | 77 | .497 | 14½ | 49‍–‍28 | 27‍–‍49 |
| Philadelphia Athletics | 36 | 117 | .235 | 54½ | 23‍–‍53 | 13‍–‍64 |

=== Record vs. opponents ===
1916 American League record Sources:
| Team | BOS | CWS | CLE | DET | NYY | PHA | SLB | WSH |
|---|---|---|---|---|---|---|---|---|
| Boston | — | 14–8 | 15–7 | 14–8 | 11–11 | 16–6 | 10–12–1 | 11–11–1 |
| Chicago | 8–14 | — | 13–9 | 13–9 | 10–12 | 18–4 | 15–7 | 12–10–1 |
| Cleveland | 7–15 | 9–13 | — | 11–11 | 12–10 | 18–4 | 11–11–2 | 9–13–1 |
| Detroit | 8–14 | 9–13 | 11–11 | — | 14–8–1 | 18–4 | 13–9 | 14–8 |
| New York | 11–11 | 12–10 | 10–12 | 8–14–1 | — | 15–7 | 9–13 | 15–7–1 |
| Philadelphia | 6–16 | 4–18 | 4–18 | 4–18 | 7–15 | — | 5–17 | 6–15–1 |
| St. Louis | 12–10–1 | 7–15 | 11–11–2 | 9–13 | 13–9 | 17–5 | — | 10–12–1 |
| Washington | 11–11–1 | 10–12–1 | 13–9–1 | 8–14 | 7–15–1 | 15–6–1 | 12–10–1 | — |

=== Opening Day lineup ===
| Harry Hooper | RF |
| Everett Scott | SS |
| Dick Hoblitzel | 1B |
| Tilly Walker | CF |
| Chick Shorten | LF |
| Larry Gardner | 3B |
| Jack Barry | 2B |
| Pinch Thomas | C |
| Babe Ruth | P |

=== Notable transactions ===
- April 9, 1916: Tris Speaker was traded by the Red Sox to the Cleveland Indians for Sad Sam Jones, Fred Thomas, and $55,000.

=== Roster ===
1916 Boston Red Sox
Roster
| Pitchers: Rube Foster; Vean Gregg; Sad Sam Jones; Dutch Leonard; Carl Mays; Marty McHale; Herb Pennock; Babe Ruth; Ernie Shore; Weldon Wyckoff | Catchers: Sam Agnew; Hick Cady; Bill Carrigan; Pinch Thomas; Infielders: Jack Barry; Del Gainer; Larry Gardner; Dick Hoblitzel; Hal Janvrin; Mike McNally; Everett Scott; Heinie Wagner; Jimmy Walsh | Outfielders: Olaf Henriksen; Harry Hooper; Duffy Lewis; Chick Shorten; Tilly Walker; Other batters: Raymond Haley | Manager: Bill Carrigan |

== Player stats ==
=== Batting ===
==== Starters by position ====
Note: Pos=Position; G=Games Played; AB=At Bats; R=Runs; H=Hits; 2B=Doubles; 3B=Triples; HR=Home Runs; RBI=Runs Batted In; BB=Walks; AVG=Batting Average; OBP=On Base Percentage; SLG=Slugging Percentage

| Pos | Player | G | AB | R | H | 2B | 3B | HR | RBI | BB | AVG | OBP | SLG | Ref |
|---|---|---|---|---|---|---|---|---|---|---|---|---|---|---|
| C | Pinch Thomas | 100 | 217 | 21 | 57 | 10 | 1 | 1 | 21 | 33 | .263 | .363 | .332 | |
| 1B | Dick Hoblitzell | 130 | 417 | 56 | 108 | 17 | 1 | 0 | 44 | 47 | .259 | .340 | .305 | |
| 2B | Jack Barry | 94 | 332 | 29 | 67 | 6 | 1 | 0 | 22 | 17 | .202 | .276 | .226 | |
| SS | Everett Scott | 123 | 364 | 36 | 85 | 19 | 2 | 0 | 29 | 23 | .234 | .285 | .297 | |
| 3B | Larry Gardner | 150 | 499 | 49 | 155 | 20 | 7 | 2 | 61 | 51 | .311 | .377 | .391 | |
| OF | Tillie Walker | 128 | 467 | 68 | 124 | 29 | 11 | 3 | 44 | 24 | .266 | .304 | .394 | |
| OF | Duffy Lewis | 152 | 562 | 57 | 151 | 29 | 5 | 1 | 57 | 34 | .269 | .316 | .343 | |
| OF | Harry Hooper | 151 | 576 | 75 | 156 | 20 | 11 | 1 | 36 | 80 | .271 | .361 | .349 | |
| P | Babe Ruth | 68 | 138 | 18 | 37 | 5 | 3 | 3 | 16 | 9 | .268 | .313 | .413 | |

==== Other batters ====
Note: G=Games Played; AB=At Bats; R=Runs; H=Hits; 2B=Doubles; 3B=Triples; HR=Home Runs; RBI=Runs Batted In; BB=Walks; AVG=Batting Average; OBP=On Base Percentage; SLG=Slugging Percentage

| Player | G | AB | R | H | 2B | 3B | HR | RBI | BB | AVG | OBP | SLG | Ref |
|---|---|---|---|---|---|---|---|---|---|---|---|---|---|
| Hal Janvrin | 115 | 311 | 32 | 70 | 11 | 4 | 0 | 27 | 33 | .225 | .303 | .286 | |
| Hick Cady | 78 | 161 | 5 | 31 | 7 | 3 | 0 | 14 | 15 | .193 | .266 | .273 | |
| Del Gainer | 57 | 143 | 14 | 36 | 6 | 0 | 3 | 21 | 10 | .252 | .301 | .357 | |
| Mike McNally | 90 | 137 | 28 | 23 | 0 | 0 | 0 | 11 | 11 | .168 | .230 | .168 | |
| Chick Shorten | 54 | 113 | 15 | 33 | 2 | 1 | 0 | 11 | 9 | .292 | .344 | .327 | |
| Olaf Henriksen | 70 | 104 | 13 | 23 | 3 | 2 | 0 | 8 | 19 | .221 | .341 | .288 | |
| Sam Agnew | 40 | 67 | 4 | 14 | 2 | 1 | 0 | 5 | 6 | .209 | .293 | .269 | |
| Bill Carrigan | 33 | 63 | 7 | 17 | 2 | 1 | 0 | 11 | 11 | .270 | .378 | .333 | |
| Jimmy Walsh | 14 | 17 | 6 | 3 | 1 | 0 | 0 | 2 | 4 | .176 | .333 | .235 | |
| Heinie Wagner | 5 | 2 | 0 | 1 | 0 | 0 | 0 | 0 | 1 | .500 | .667 | .500 | |
| Raymond Haley | 1 | 1 | 0 | 0 | 0 | 0 | 0 | 0 | 0 | .000 | .000 | .000 | |

==== Pitchers ====
Note: G=Games Played; AB=At Bats; R=Runs; H=Hits; 2B=Doubles; 3B=Triples; HR=Home Runs; RBI=Runs Batted In; BB=Walks; AVG=Batting Average; OBP=On Base Percentage; SLG=Slugging Percentage

| Player | G | AB | R | H | 2B | 3B | HR | RBI | BB | AVG | OBP | SLG | Ref |
|---|---|---|---|---|---|---|---|---|---|---|---|---|---|
| Dutch Leonard | 48 | 83 | 2 | 17 | 3 | 0 | 0 | 10 | 6 | .205 | .258 | .241 | |
| Carl Mays | 48 | 77 | 8 | 18 | 1 | 2 | 0 | 8 | 16 | .234 | .366 | .299 | |
| Ernie Shore | 38 | 77 | 3 | 7 | 2 | 0 | 0 | 3 | 3 | .091 | .125 | .117 | |
| Rube Foster | 38 | 62 | 3 | 11 | 3 | 0 | 0 | 2 | 3 | .177 | .215 | .226 | |
| Vean Gregg | 21 | 19 | 0 | 2 | 1 | 0 | 0 | 0 | 0 | .105 | .105 | .158 | |
| Herb Pennock | 11 | 8 | 0 | 1 | 0 | 0 | 0 | 0 | 1 | .125 | .222 | .125 | |
| Sad Sam Jones | 13 | 6 | 0 | 2 | 0 | 0 | 0 | 0 | 0 | .333 | .333 | .333 | |
| Weldon Wyckoff | 9 | 7 | 1 | 1 | 0 | 0 | 0 | 0 | 0 | .143 | .143 | .143 | |
| Marty McHale | 2 | 0 | 0 | 0 | 0 | 0 | 0 | 0 | 1 | ─ | 1.000 | ─ | |

=== Pitching ===
Note: G=Games Played; GS=Games Started; IP=Innings Pitched; H=Hits; BB=Walks; R=Runs; ER=Earned Runs; SO=Strikeouts; W=Wins; L=Losses; SV=Saves; ERA=Earned Run Average

| Player | G | GS | IP | H | BB | R | ER | SO | W | L | SV | ERA | Ref |
|---|---|---|---|---|---|---|---|---|---|---|---|---|---|
| Babe Ruth | 44 | 40 | 323 2/3 | 230 | 118 | 83 | 64 | 169 | 23 | 12 | 1 | 1.78 | |
| Dutch Leonard | 48 | 35 | 273 | 242 | 66 | 86 | 71 | 145 | 18 | 12 | 6 | 2.34 | |
| Carl Mays | 44 | 24 | 245 | 208 | 74 | 80 | 66 | 77 | 18 | 13 | 3 | 2.42 | |
| Ernie Shore | 38 | 28 | 225 1/3 | 221 | 49 | 84 | 67 | 62 | 16 | 10 | 1 | 2.68 | |
| Rube Foster | 33 | 19 | 183 | 175 | 86 | 72 | 59 | 55 | 14 | 7 | 2 | 2.90 | |
| Vean Gregg | 21 | 7 | 77 1/3 | 72 | 30 | 32 | 26 | 42 | 2 | 5 | 0 | 3.03 | |
| Herb Pennock | 9 | 2 | 26 2/3 | 23 | 8 | 11 | 9 | 12 | 0 | 2 | 1 | 3.04 | |
| Sad Sam Jones | 12 | 0 | 26 2/3 | 25 | 10 | 12 | 9 | 7 | 0 | 1 | 1 | 3.04 | |
| Weldon Wyckoff | 8 | 0 | 22 2/3 | 18 | 18 | 13 | 12 | 18 | 0 | 0 | 1 | 4.76 | |
| Marty McHale | 2 | 1 | 6 | 7 | 4 | 7 | 2 | 1 | 0 | 1 | 0 | 3.00 | |

== 1916 World Series ==
AL Boston Red Sox (4) vs. NL Brooklyn Robins (1)

| Game | Score | Date | Location | Attendance |
|---|---|---|---|---|
| 1 | Robins – 5, Red Sox – 6 | October 7 | Braves Field | 36,117 |
| 2 | Robins – 1, Red Sox – 2 (14) | October 9 | Braves Field | 41,373 |
| 3 | Red Sox – 3, Robins – 4 | October 10 | Ebbets Field | 21,087 |
| 4 | Red Sox – 6, Robins – 2 | October 11 | Ebbets Field | 21,662 |
| 5 | Robins – 1, Red Sox – 4 | October 12 | Braves Field | 42,620 |
