= Milo Allison =

American baseball player (1890–1957)

- Outfielder
- Born: October 16, 1890; Elk Rapids, Michigan, U.S.
- Died: June 18, 1957 (aged 66); Kenosha, Wisconsin, U.S.
- Batted: Left Threw: Right

MLB debut
- September 26, 1913, for the Chicago Cubs

Last MLB appearance
- June 29, 1917, for the Cleveland Indians

MLB statistics
- Batting average: .217
- Hits: 13
- Runs batted in: 0
- Stats at Baseball Reference

Teams
- Chicago Cubs (1913–1914); Cleveland Indians (1916–1917)

Milo Henry Allison (October 16, 1890 – June 18, 1957) was an American professional baseball player from 1913 to 1917. As an outfielder, he played for the Chicago Cubs and Cleveland Indians. His career batting average was .217, with no extra-base hits in the major leagues.
