= Zeb Terry =

American baseball player (1891–1988)

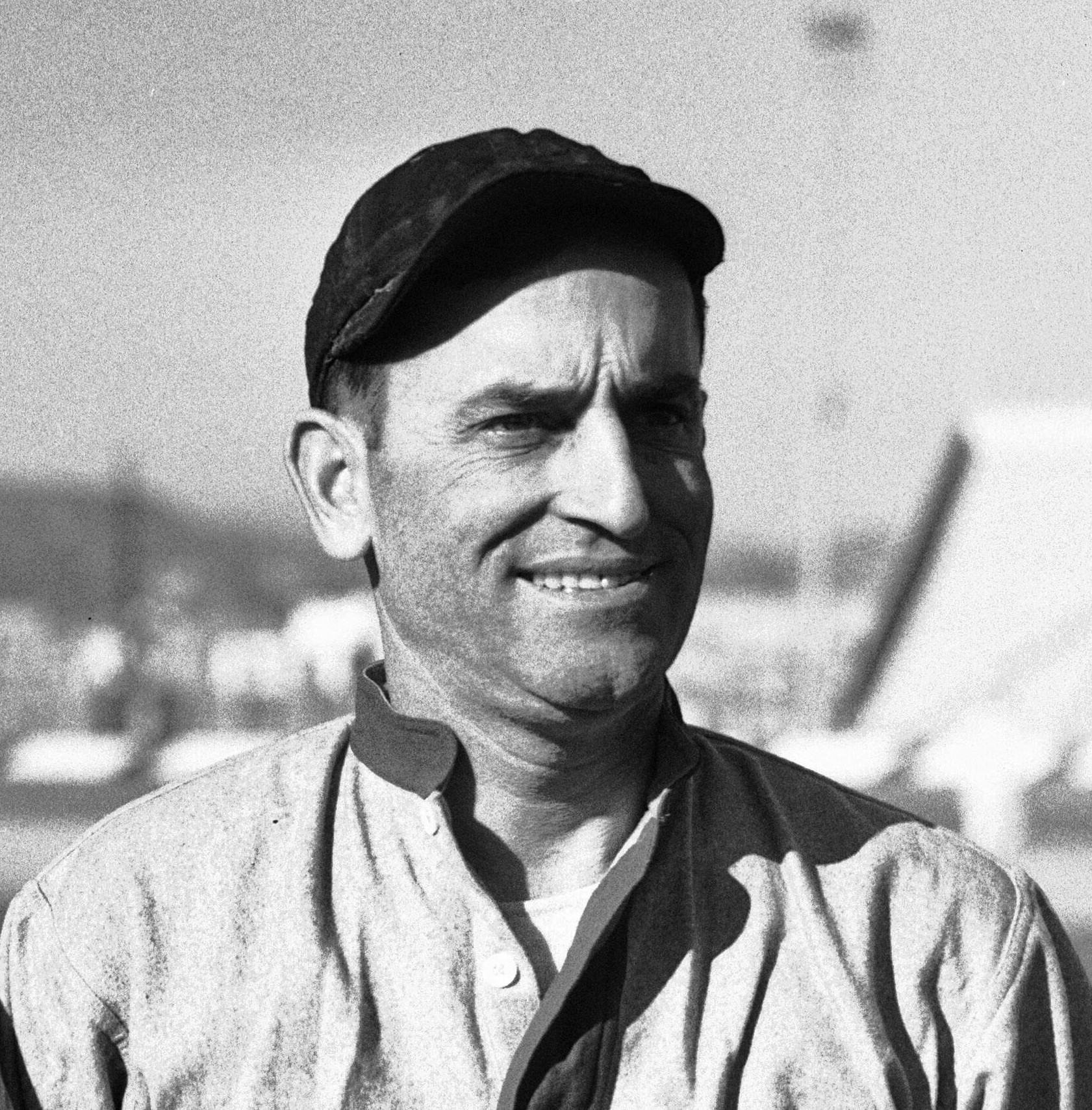
- Terry in 1936
- Infielder
- Born: June 17, 1891; Denison, Texas, U.S.
- Died: March 14, 1988 (aged 96); Los Angeles, California, U.S.
- Batted: Right Threw: Right

MLB debut
- April 12, 1916, for the Chicago White Sox

Last MLB appearance
- October 1, 1922, for the Chicago Cubs

MLB statistics
- Batting average: .260
- Home runs: 2
- Runs batted in: 216
- Stats at Baseball Reference

Teams
- Chicago White Sox (1916–1917); Boston Braves (1918); Pittsburgh Pirates (1919); Chicago Cubs (1920–1922)

Zebulon Alexander Terry (June 17, 1891 – March 14, 1988) was a professional baseball player who played infield in the Major Leagues from 1916–1922 for the Boston Braves, Chicago Cubs, Chicago White Sox, and Pittsburgh Pirates. He played college baseball at Stanford University.

Terry made his big-league debut on April 12, 1916, starting at shortstop for the White Sox against the Detroit Tigers in a game at Comiskey Park. He went hitless with a walk, but teammates didn't fare much better that day against Detroit's Harry Coveleski, who pitched a three-hit shutout.

Sparingly used by the Sox, and hitting just .190 as a rookie, Terry ended up changing teams in 1918, 1919 and 1920. He found his greatest success with the Cubs, getting most of his 605 career hits for them. In the 1922 season, his last in the majors, Terry led the National League in sacrifice hits with 22. Terry announced his "voluntary retirement" from baseball to pursue real estate in the Los Angeles area in early 1923

Born in Texas, he attended Long Beach Polytechnic High School in California, which by one recent count has produced 19 Major League Baseball players, including Tony Gwynn and brother Chris Gwynn, Milton Bradley, Rocky Bridges and Chase Utley.
