= Bill Fincher (baseball) =

American baseball player (1894-1946)

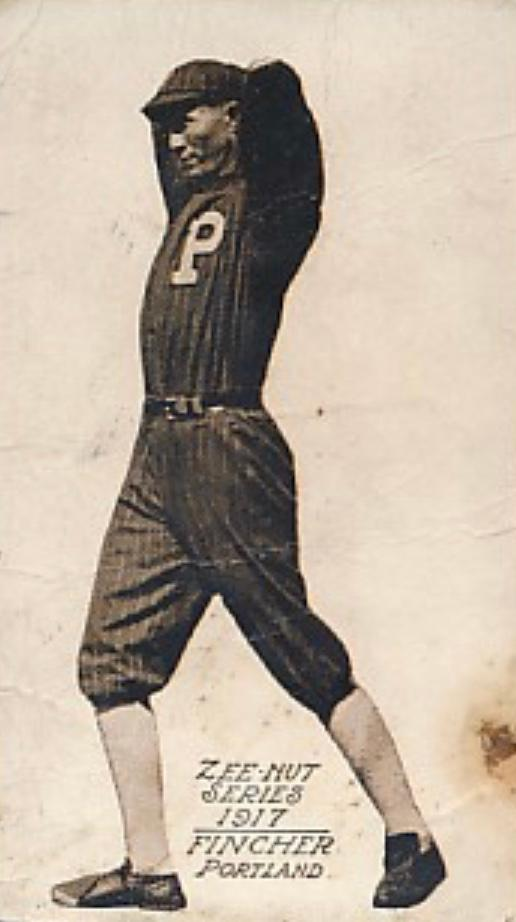
- Pitcher
- Born: May 26, 1894; Atlanta
- Died: May 7, 1946 (aged 51); Shreveport, Louisiana
- Batted: Right Threw: Right

MLB debut
- April 23, 1916, for the St. Louis Browns

Last MLB appearance
- April 23, 1916, for the St. Louis Browns

MLB statistics
- Win–loss record: 0–1
- Earned run average: 2.14
- Strikeouts: 5
- Stats at Baseball Reference

Teams
- St. Louis Browns (1916)

William Allen Fincher (May 26, 1894 – May 7, 1946) was a Major League Baseball pitcher who played for the St. Louis Browns in 1916. In 1946, Fincher committed suicide with a pistol in Shreveport, Louisiana.
