= Ray Kennedy (baseball) =

American baseball player (1895-1969)

- Pinch hitter
- Born: May 19, 1895; Pittsburgh, Pennsylvania, U.S.
- Died: January 18, 1969 (aged 73); Casselberry, Florida, U.S.
- Batted: Right Threw: Right

MLB debut
- September 8, 1916, for the St. Louis Browns

Last MLB appearance
- September 8, 1916, for the St. Louis Browns

MLB statistics
- Games played: 1
- At bats: 1
- Hit(s): 0
- Stats at Baseball Reference

Teams
- St. Louis Browns (1916)

Raymond Lincoln Kennedy (May 19, 1895 – January 18, 1969) was an American professional baseball player, scout and front office executive. He was born in Pittsburgh, Pennsylvania.

== Playing career: One MLB at-bat ==
Kennedy's professional playing career came almost exclusively at the minor league level. A catcher and second baseman, he played from 1915 to 1917 and in 1919–27, largely in the original Sally League. He made one appearance as a player in Major League Baseball as a pinch hitter for the 1916 St. Louis Browns on September 8, and went hitless in his only at bat against the Detroit Tigers. He had spent most of that season in the Class D Illinois State League.

== Executive career: First GM of Pirates (1946) ==
Kennedy was the first person to hold the title of general manager in the history of the Pittsburgh Pirates, spending one season, 1946, in the post. He had been hired from the New York Yankees organization, where he had previously been secretary and business manager of the Newark Bears, one of the Bombers' two top-level farm clubs. However, the Bucs were in the process of being sold after 46 years of ownership by the Barney Dreyfuss family. On August 8, 1946, the team was purchased by a consortium led by Indianapolis businessman Frank McKinney, Columbus, Ohio-based real estate developer John W. Galbreath, Pittsburgh attorney Thomas P. Johnson, and entertainer Bing Crosby.

The Pirates' new owners brought in their own general manager at the end of the season: Roy Hamey, who had been president of the Triple-A American Association. Ironically, Hamey had previously been Kennedy's peer as the business manager of the Yankees' other top farm team, the Kansas City Blues. In the front-office transition that followed, Kennedy remained with the Pirates as director of minor league clubs from 1947 to 1948. In 1949, Kennedy became minor league director of the Detroit Tigers, serving through 1951. In 1955, Kennedy was player personnel director of the Kansas City Athletics and was working as a scout for the New York Mets at the time of his death, at age 73, in Casselberry, Florida.

== See also ==
Preceded by William Benswanger (Club president)	Pittsburgh Pirates General Manager; 1946	Succeeded by Roy Hamey
