= Rip Hagerman =

American baseball player (1888–1930)

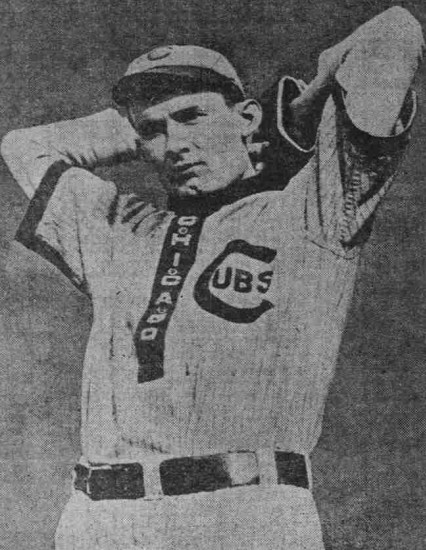
- Pitcher
- Born: June 20, 1886; Lyndon, Kansas, U.S.
- Died: January 30, 1930 (aged 43); Albuquerque, New Mexico, U.S.
- Batted: Right Threw: Right

MLB debut
- April 16, 1909, for the Chicago Cubs

Last MLB appearance
- May 11, 1916, for the Cleveland Indians

MLB statistics
- Win–loss record: 19–33
- Strikeouts: 214
- Earned run average: 3.09
- Stats at Baseball Reference

Teams
- Chicago Cubs (1909); Cleveland Naps/Indians (1914–1916)

Zerah Zequiel "Rip" Hagerman (June 20, 1888 – January 30, 1930) was an American Major League Baseball player who played pitcher from 1909–1916. He would play for the Chicago Cubs and Cleveland Indians.

Hagerman began his professional career in 1908, winning 30 games for the Class C Topeka White Sox. In 1909, he was signed by the Chicago Cubs and made his major league debut on April 16. He played on and off throughout the year, finishing the season with a 4–4 win–loss record and a 1.82 earned run average (ERA) in 13 games. After his first season in the major leagues, in May 1910, Hagerman signed with the Lincoln Railsplitters of the Western League. That same month, on May 17, Hagerman married Maude McQuade in Chicago, Illinois. He spent the next three years with Lincoln. His best season came in 1912, when he finished the season with a 23–18 record and a 3.31 ERA in 51 games.

On December 7, 1912, Hagerman was traded by the Railsplitters to the Portland Beavers of the Pacific Coast League. He spent the full season with Portland, finishing the season with a 14–9 record and a 3.13 RA in 44 games. The Cleveland Naps signed him for the 1914 season, and in 37 games he had a 9–15 record and a 3.09 ERA. In November 1914 the Chicago Whales of the Federal League and Hagerman negotiated a contract, but failed to come to an agreement.

He returned to Cleveland, where he remained for the next two seasons. After pitching in 29 games in 1915, he played in just two before being demoted to the Portland Beavers of the Pacific Coast League in May 1916. Before the 1917 season Portland traded Hagerman to the St. Paul Saints. At first he was reluctant to join the club and voiced his desire to return to the Pacific Coast League, however, he signed with St. Paul in March 1917. Hagerman spent the next two seasons in St. Paul. After the season ended, he took a job with Nash Motors rather than continue to play baseball, ending his professional career.
