= Joe Fautsch =

American baseball player (1887–1971)

- Pinch hitter
- Born: February 28, 1887; Minneapolis, Minnesota, U.S.
- Died: March 16, 1971 (aged 84); New Hope, Minnesota, U.S.
- Batted: Right Threw: Right

MLB debut
- April 24, 1916, for the Chicago White Sox

Last MLB appearance
- April 24, 1916, for the Chicago White Sox

MLB statistics
- Games played: 1
- At bats: 1
- Hits: 0
- Stats at Baseball Reference

Teams
- Chicago White Sox (1916)

Joseph Roamon Fautsch (February 28, 1887 – March 16, 1971) was an American pinch hitter in Major League Baseball. He played for the Chicago White Sox in 1916.
