= Joe Leonard (baseball) =

American baseball player (1894–1920)

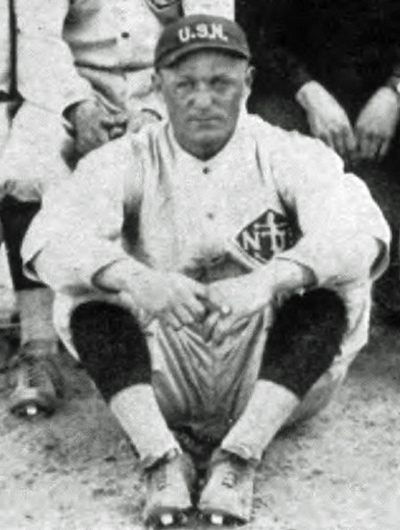
- Third Baseman
- Born: November 14, 1893; West Chicago, Illinois
- Died: May 1, 1920 (aged 26); Washington, D.C.
- Batted: Left Threw: Right

MLB debut
- April 24, 1914, for the Pittsburgh Pirates

Last MLB appearance
- April 23, 1920, for the Washington Senators

MLB statistics
- Batting average: .226
- Home Rus: 2
- Runs batted in: 61
- Stats at Baseball Reference

Teams
- Pittsburgh Pirates (1914); Cleveland Indians (1916); Washington Senators (1916–1917, 1919–1920)

Joseph Howard Leonard (November 15, 1894 – May 1, 1920) was an American Major League Baseball player, born in Chicago on November 15, 1894. He died in Washington, D.C., on May 1, 1920.

Leonard played in parts of five seasons (1914, 1916–1920) with the Pittsburgh Pirates, Cleveland Indians, and Washington Senators. He recorded 179 hits over 791 at-bats in 269 games during his career. Defensively, Leonard was primarily a third baseman.

In 1918 Leonard's career was interrupted while he served in World War I.

== See also ==
- List of baseball players who died during their careers
