= Jack Bradley (baseball) =

American baseball player (1893–1969)

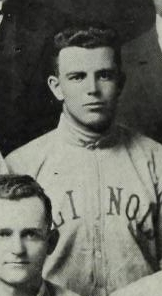
- Catcher
- Born: September 20, 1893; Denver, Colorado, U.S.
- Died: March 18, 1969 (aged 75); Tulsa, Oklahoma, U.S.
- Batted: Right Threw: Right

MLB debut
- June 18, 1916, for the Cleveland Indians

Last MLB appearance
- July 31, 1916, for the Cleveland Indians

MLB statistics
- Batting average: .000
- Hits: 0
- Runs: 0
- Stats at Baseball Reference

Teams
- Cleveland Indians (1916)

John Thomas Bradley (September 20, 1893 - March 18, 1969) was an American Major League Baseball catcher who played for one season. He played for the Cleveland Indians from June 18 to July 31, 1916 and had no hits in three at-bats.
