= Ivan Howard =

American baseball player (1882–1967)

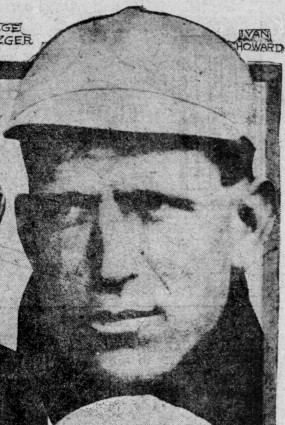
- Infielder
- Born: October 12, 1882; Kenney, Illinois, U.S.
- Died: March 30, 1967 (aged 84); Medford, Oregon, U.S.
- Batted: Switch Threw: Right

MLB debut
- April 25, 1914, for the St. Louis Browns

Last MLB appearance
- September 29, 1917, for the Cleveland Indians

MLB statistics
- Batting average: .233
- Home runs: 2
- Runs batted in: 86
- Stats at Baseball Reference

Teams
- St. Louis Browns (1914–1915); Cleveland Indians (1916–1917)

Ivan Chester Howard (October 12, 1882 – March 30, 1967) was an American professional baseball infielder who played for four seasons in Major League Baseball (MLB). Howard was the younger brother of major leaguer Del Howard. He played for the St. Louis Browns during 1914 and 1915, primarily as a first baseman, after which he was replaced by George Sisler, then was purchased by the Cleveland Indians on February 20, 1916, for whom he played chiefly at second base in the 1916 campaign. His career came to an end with 27 games played in 1917.

He was later the manager of the Oakland Oaks minor league team in the Pacific Coast League from 1923 to 1929.
