= Mike Cantwell =

American baseball player (1894-1953)

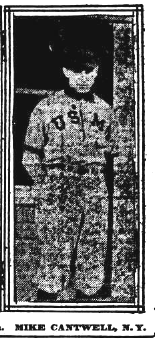
- Pitcher
- Born: June 15, 1894; Washington, D.C.
- Died: January 5, 1953 (aged 58); Asheville, North Carolina
- Batted: Right Threw: Right

MLB debut
- August 17, 1916, for the New York Yankees

Last MLB appearance
- May 22, 1920, for the Philadelphia Phillies

MLB statistics
- Win–loss record: 1–6
- Earned run average: 4.61
- Strikeouts: 14
- Stats at Baseball Reference

Teams
- New York Yankees (1916); Philadelphia Phillies (1919–1920)

Michael Joseph Cantwell (June 15, 1894 – January 5, 1953) was a Major League Baseball pitcher. A cousin of former Cincinnati Reds pitcher and paper company operator Tom Cantwell, Cantwell played for the New York Yankees in 1916 and the Philadelphia Phillies in 1919 and 1920. In 11 career games, he had a 1–6 record with a 4.61 ERA. He batted and threw left-handed.

Cantwell served in the United States Marines on multiple occasions, serving at Marine Corps Base Quantico during World War I and in China at the United States Embassy from 1935–1937. He coached the baseball team at Quantico in the 1930s. He also returned to Marine duty during World War II, serving on a platoon during the Guadalcanal campaign. At Guadalcanal, Cantwell was injured by a 500-pound (230 kg) bomb from the Imperial Japanese Armed Forces. Cantwell was getting treatment for lung complications from his injuries at the Oteen Veterans Administration Hospital in Asheville, North Carolina when he died on January 5, 1953. Prior to his death, he had shown interest in returning the Marines for more service. For his service, the Marines agreed to let him be buried at Arlington National Cemetery in uniform with full military honors.
