= Verne Clemons =

American baseball player (1891–1959)

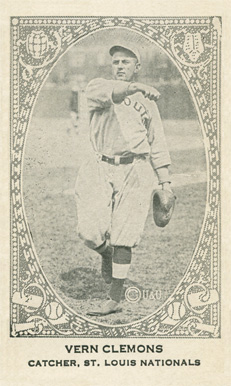
- Catcher
- Born: September 8, 1891; Clemons, Iowa, U.S.
- Died: May 5, 1959 (aged 67); Bay Pines, Florida, U.S.
- Batted: Right Threw: Right

MLB debut
- April 22, 1916, for the St. Louis Browns

Last MLB appearance
- September 28, 1924, for the St. Louis Cardinals

MLB statistics
- Batting average: .286
- Home runs: 5
- Runs batted in: 140
- Stats at Baseball Reference

Teams
- St. Louis Browns (1916); St. Louis Cardinals (1919–24)

Verne James Clemons (September 8, 1891 – May 5, 1959) was an American professional baseball player. He played all or part of seven seasons in Major League Baseball, primarily as a catcher. He made his major league debut for the St. Louis Browns in 1916, then returned to the majors for the St. Louis Cardinals for six seasons, from 1919 until 1924.

In 474 games over seven seasons, Clemons posted a .286 batting average (364-for-1271) with 78 runs, 5 home runs, 140 RBI and 119 bases on balls. He finished his career with a .983 fielding percentage playing every inning in the majors as a catcher.

== Sources ==
- Career statistics from Baseball Reference · Baseball Reference (Minors) · Retrosheet · Baseball Almanac
