= George Hale (baseball) =

American baseball player (1894-1945)

- Catcher
- Born: August 3, 1894; Dexter, Kansas, U.S.
- Died: November 1, 1945 (aged 51); Wichita, Kansas, U.S.
- Batted: Right Threw: Right

MLB debut
- August 24, 1914, for the St. Louis Browns

Last MLB appearance
- June 26, 1918, for the St. Louis Browns

MLB statistics
- Batting average: .175
- Home runs: 0
- Runs batted in: 9
- Stats at Baseball Reference

Teams
- St. Louis Browns (1914, 1916–1918)

George Wagner Hale (August 3, 1894 – November 1, 1945) was an American professional baseball player. Nicknamed "Ducky", he was a catcher over parts of four seasons (1914, 1916–18) with the St. Louis Browns. For his career, he compiled a .175 batting average in 103 at-bats, with nine runs batted in.

He was born in Dexter, Kansas and died in Wichita, Kansas at the age of 51.
