= Jess Buckles =

American baseball player (1890-1975)

- Pitcher
- Born: May 20, 1890; Lordsburg, California, U.S.
- Died: August 2, 1975 (aged 85); Westminster, California, U.S.
- Batted: Left Threw: Left

MLB debut
- September 17, 1916, for the New York Yankees

Last MLB appearance
- October 3, 1916, for the New York Yankees

MLB statistics
- Win–loss record: 0–0
- Earned run average: 2.25
- Strikeouts: 2
- Stats at Baseball Reference

Teams
- New York Yankees (1916)

Jesse Robert Buckles (May 20, 1890 – August 2, 1975), nicknamed "Jim", was an American Major League Baseball pitcher who appeared in two games, both in relief, for the New York Yankees near the end of the 1916 season.

Buckles made his major league debut on September 17, 1916, against the Cleveland Indians at League Park. His second and final appearance (October 3) was in a home game against the Washington Senators at the Polo Grounds. In his two games he pitched a total of four innings and gave up just one earned run, giving him an ERA of 2.25.
