= Earl Hamilton =

American baseball player (1891–1968)

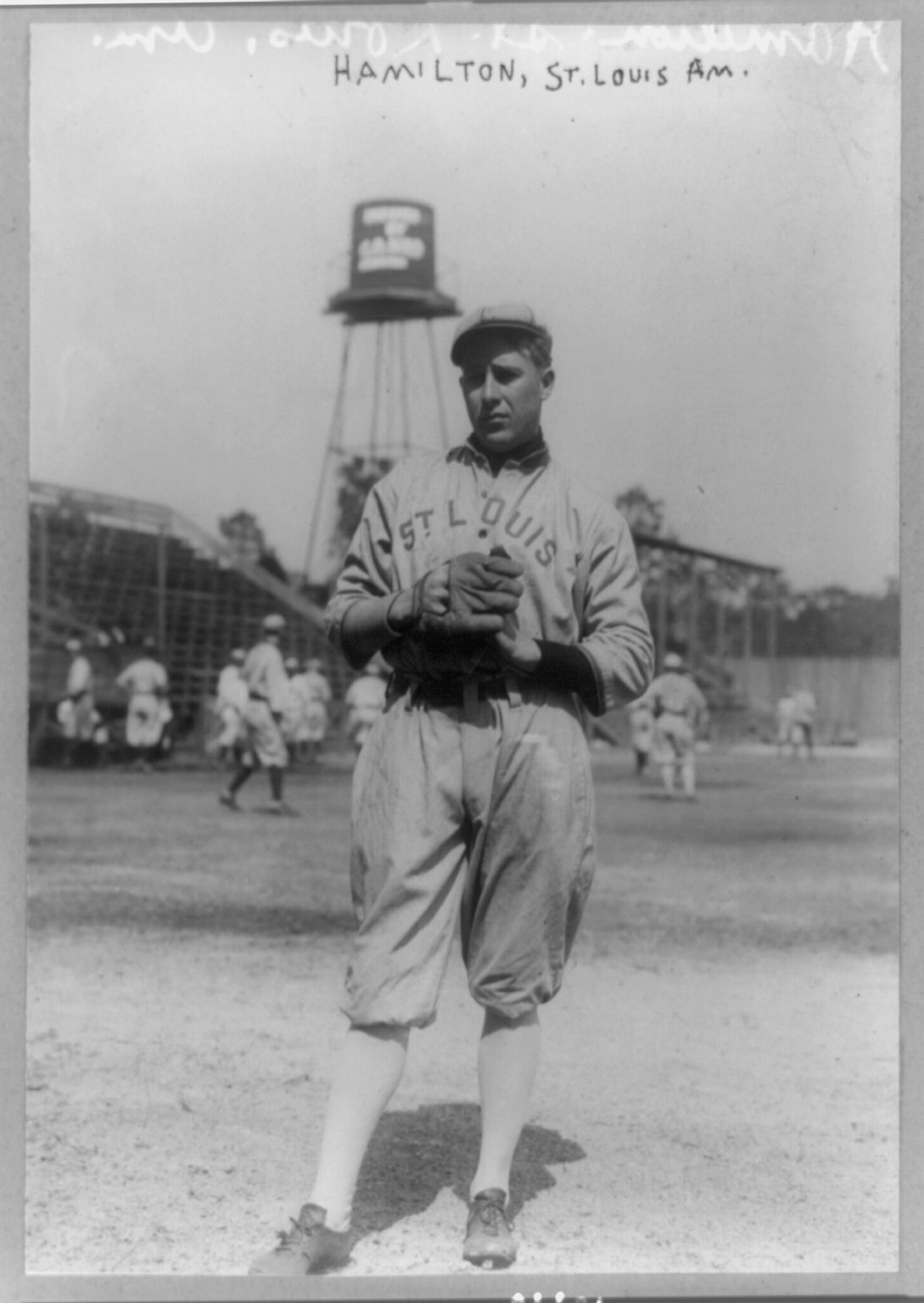
- Pitcher
- Born: July 19, 1891; Gibson City, Illinois, U.S.
- Died: November 17, 1968 (aged 77); Anaheim, California, U.S.
- Batted: Left Threw: Left

MLB debut
- April 14, 1911, for the St. Louis Browns

Last MLB appearance
- May 4, 1924, for the Philadelphia Phillies

MLB statistics
- Win–loss record: 115–147
- Earned run average: 3.16
- Strikeouts: 790
- Stats at Baseball Reference

Teams
- St. Louis Browns (1911–1916); Detroit Tigers (1916); St. Louis Browns (1916–1917); Pittsburgh Pirates (1918–1923); Philadelphia Phillies (1924)

Career highlights and awards
- Pitched a no-hitter on August 30, 1912

Earl Andrew Hamilton (July 19, 1891 – November 17, 1968) was an American left-handed pitcher for the St. Louis Browns (1911–16, later in 1916–17), Detroit Tigers (1916), Pittsburgh Pirates (1918–23), and the Philadelphia Phillies (1924) of Major League Baseball (MLB). He pitched a no-hitter against Detroit on August 30, 1912, becoming the first player to pitch a no-hitter without recording a strikeout. The Tigers did get a run on a Ty Cobb walk and an error, making the final score 5-1 Browns. Hamilton also batted left-handed and ended his career with an average pitcher's batting average of .153 in 733 at bats.

== Career overview ==
Born in Gibson City, Illinois, Hamilton played his first major league game on April 14, 1911. Through the early to mid-teens, Hamilton was considered a quality pitcher and was one of the better pitchers on some terrible Browns teams. In 1914, Hamilton had a very quality season, going 16–18 with a 2.50 ERA in 302 1/3 innings pitched.

After being purchased by Detroit in 1916, he was waived back to the Browns less than a month later. Then, in 1918, he finally left St. Louis for good after an 0–9 season, being purchased by Pittsburgh before the season began. That season, in 6 starts, he had one of the most amazing seasons ever recorded. Hamilton was 6–0 with a 0.83 ERA in 54 innings that year. He finished with 1 shutout in his 6 complete games. Hamilton had only given up 7 runs (5 earned) in 6 games. Oddly, he picked that season to enlist in the Navy. Hamilton returned for more fair seasons with the Pirates. Along with Wilbur Cooper, Whitey Glazner, and Babe Adams, he helped make up a good rotation for Pittsburgh, culminating with a second-place finish in 1921 (behind only the New York Giants, 4 games). However, they never made the World Series with Hamilton.

Before he retired in 1924, Hamilton was selected off waivers by the Phillies, and he went 0–1 with them, with a 10.50 ERA. Hamilton made sparse appearances on leaderboards throughout his career, such as a 9th-place finish in the ERA leaderboard (3.36, 1921) and tying for a 7th-place finish in wins in 1914, when he had 16. He also made the top 10 in losses three times (1914, 15, 21), and ended up finishing only two years of his career with a winning record; his 6–0 season of 1918 and 1922 (11–7).

Hamilton pitched 16 shutout innings on July 16, 1920, with the Pirates, before losing 7–0 against the New York Giants, clearly having run out of gas in the 17th. Rube Benton was the Giants' pitcher, also going 16 shutout innings. In 14 years, he was 115–147 with a solid 3.16 ERA in 410 games (261 starts). He pitched 140 complete games, 16 of them shutouts. Hamilton recorded 790 career strikeouts and allowed 1075 runs (822 earned) in 2342 2/3 innings pitched.

He died in Anaheim, California, at the age of 77.

== See also ==
- List of Major League Baseball no-hitters

== Sources ==
- Career statistics from Baseball Reference · Baseball Reference (Minors) · Retrosheet · Baseball Almanac
- Negro league baseball statistics and player information from Seamheads

| Preceded by George Mullin | No-hitter pitcher August 30, 1912 | Succeeded by Jeff Tesreau |
