= 1915 Philadelphia Athletics season =

1915 Philadelphia Athletics
- League: American League
- Ballpark: Shibe Park
- City: Philadelphia
- Record: 43–109 (.283)
- League place: 8th
- Owners: Connie Mack, Benjamin Shibe, Tom Shibe and John Shibe
- Managers: Connie Mack

The 1915 Philadelphia Athletics season was a season in American baseball. After the team won the American League pennant in 1914, the team dropped all the way to last place with a record of 43 wins and 109 losses.

== Offseason ==
- December 8, 1914: Eddie Collins was purchased from the Athletics by the Chicago White Sox.
- January 1915, Nap Lajoie was purchased by the Athletics from the Cleveland Indians.

== Regular season ==
The Federal League had been formed to begin play in 1914. As the A.L. had done 13 years before, the new league raided existing A.L. and N.L. teams for players. Athletics owner Connie Mack refused to match the offers of the F.L. teams, preferring to let the "prima donnas" go and rebuild with younger (and less expensive) players. The result was a swift and near-total collapse, a "first-to-worst" situation. The Athletics went from a 99–53 (.651) record and a pennant in 1914 to a record of 43–109 (.283) and 8th (last) place in 1915. At the time, it was the third-worst winning percentage in American League history. The infield of Whitey Witt, Charlie Pick and Nap Lajoie was derisively known as the "$10 Infield".

=== Season highlights ===
- June 23, 1915: Athletics pitcher Bruno Haas set an American League record by walking 16 Yankees in one game.

=== Season standings ===
American League
Team	W	L	Pct.	GB	Home	Road
Boston Red Sox	101	50	.669	—	55‍–‍20	46‍–‍30
Detroit Tigers	100	54	.649	2½	51‍–‍26	49‍–‍28
Chicago White Sox	93	61	.604	9½	54‍–‍24	39‍–‍37
Washington Senators	85	68	.556	17	50‍–‍29	35‍–‍39
New York Yankees	69	83	.454	32½	37‍–‍43	32‍–‍40
St. Louis Browns	63	91	.409	39½	35‍–‍38	28‍–‍53
Cleveland Indians	57	95	.375	44½	27‍–‍50	30‍–‍45
Philadelphia Athletics	43	109	.283	58½	19‍–‍53	24‍–‍56

=== Record vs. opponents ===
1915 American League record Sources:
Team	BOS	CWS	CLE	DET	NYY	PHA	SLB	WSH
Boston	—	12–10	16–4	14–8	10–12	17–5–1	17–5–2	15–6–1
Chicago	10–12	—	16–6	7–15	15–7	19–3	18–4	8–14–1
Cleveland	4–16	6–16	—	5–17	9–13–1	15–7–1	12–10	6–16
Detroit	8–14	15–7	17–5	—	17–5	17–5	13–9–2	13–9
New York	12–10	7–15	13–9–1	5–17	—	11–9	12–10–1	9–13
Philadelphia	5–17–1	3–19	7–15–1	5–17	9–11	—	6–16	8–14
St. Louis	5–17–2	4–18	10–12	9–13–2	10–12–1	16–6	—	9–13
Washington	6–15–1	14–8–1	16–6	9–13	13–9	14–8	13–9	—

=== Roster ===
1915 Philadelphia Athletics
Roster
Pitchers: Walter Ancker; Rube Bressler; Joe Bush; Bob Cone; Cap Crowell; Bud Davis; Harry Eccles; Dana Fillingim; Bruno Haas; Jack Harper; Tom Knowlson; Bill Meehan; Bill Morrisette; Elmer Myers; Jack Nabors; Herb Pennock; Bob Pepper; Squiz Pillion; Carl Ray; Jack Richardson; Bob Shawkey; Tom Sheehan; Joe Sherman; Tink Turner; Harry Weaver; Weldon Wyckoff	Catchers: Bill Haeffner; Jack Lapp; Wickey McAvoy; Cy Perkins; Ira Thomas; Infielders: Jack Barry; Henry Bostick; Owen Conway; Art Corcoran; Sam Crane; Harry Damrau; Buck Danner; Harry Davis; Edwards; Thomas Healy; Larry Kopf; Nap Lajoie; Fred Lear; Lew Malone; Sam McConnell; Stuffy McInnis; Wally Schang; Socks Seibold	Outfielders: Everett Bankston; Chick Davies; Eddie Murphy; Rube Oldring; Amos Strunk; Shag Thompson; Jimmy Walsh	Manager: Connie Mack

== Player stats ==
=== Batting ===
==== Starters by position ====
Note: Pos = Position; G = Games played; AB = At bats; H = Hits; Avg. = Batting average; HR = Home runs; RBI = Runs batted in

Pos	Player	G	AB	H	Avg.	HR	RBI
C	Jack Lapp	112	312	85	.272	2	31
1B	Stuffy McInnis	119	456	143	.314	0	49
2B	Nap Lajoie	129	490	137	.280	1	61
SS	Larry Kopf	118	386	87	.225	1	33
3B	Wally Schang	116	359	89	.248	1	44
OF	Rube Oldring	107	408	101	.248	6	42
OF	Amos Strunk	132	485	144	.297	1	45
OF	Jimmy Walsh	117	417	86	.206	1	20

==== Other batters ====
Note: G = Games played; AB = At bats; H = Hits; Avg. = Batting average; HR = Home runs; RBI = Runs batted in

Player	G	AB	H	Avg.	HR	RBI
Eddie Murphy	68	260	60	.231	0	17
Lew Malone	76	201	41	.204	1	17
Jack Barry	54	194	43	.222	0	15
Wickey McAvoy	68	184	35	.190	0	6
Chick Davies	57	135	24	.178	0	11
Thomas Healy	23	77	17	.221	0	5
Harry Damrau	16	56	11	.196	0	3
Bill Bankston	11	36	5	.139	1	2
Shag Thompson	17	33	11	.333	0	2
Socks Seibold	10	26	3	.115	0	2
Sam Crane	8	23	2	.087	0	1
Cy Perkins	7	20	4	.200	0	0
Bruno Haas	12	18	1	.056	0	0
Owen Conway	4	15	1	.067	0	0
Buck Danner	3	12	3	.250	0	0
Sam McConnell	6	11	2	.182	0	0
Henry Bostick	2	7	0	.000	0	2
Edwards	2	5	0	.000	0	0
Bill Haeffner	3	4	1	.250	0	0
Art Corcoran	1	4	0	.000	0	0
Harry Davis	5	3	1	.333	0	4
Fred Lear	2	2	0	.000	0	0
Ira Thomas	1	0	0	----	0	0

=== Pitching ===
==== Starting pitchers ====
Note: G = Games pitched; IP = Innings pitched; W = Wins; L = Losses; ERA = Earned run average; SO = Strikeouts

Player	G	IP	W	L	ERA	SO
Weldon Wyckoff	43	276.0	10	22	3.52	157
Joe Bush	25	145.2	5	15	4.14	89
Tom Sheehan	15	102.0	4	9	4.15	22
Bob Shawkey	17	100.0	6	6	4.05	56
Cap Crowell	10	54.1	2	6	5.47	15
Jack Nabors	10	54.0	0	5	5.50	18
Jack Richardson	3	24.0	0	1	2.63	11
Harry Weaver	2	18.0	0	2	3.00	1
Elmer Myers	1	9.0	0	0	0.00	12
Bill Meehan	1	4.0	0	1	22.50	0
Tink Turner	1	2.0	0	1	22.50	0
Bob Cone	1	0.2	0	0	40.50	0

==== Other pitchers ====
Note: G = Games pitched; IP = Innings pitched; W = Wins; L = Losses; ERA = Earned run average; SO = Strikeouts

Player	G	IP	W	L	ERA	SO
Rube Bressler	32	178.1	4	17	5.20	69
Tom Knowlson	18	100.2	4	6	3.49	24
Herb Pennock	11	44.0	3	6	5.32	24
Dana Fillingim	8	39.1	0	5	3.43	17
Chick Davies	5	23.1	1	3	8.87	8
Harry Eccles	5	21.0	0	1	4.71	13
Bill Morrisette	4	20.0	2	0	1.35	11
Walter Ancker	4	17.2	0	0	3.57	4
Joe Sherman	2	15.0	1	0	2.40	5
Bruno Haas	6	14.1	0	1	11.93	7
Carl Ray	2	7.1	0	1	4.91	6

==== Relief pitchers ====
Note: G = Games pitched; W = Wins; L = Losses; SV = Saves; ERA = Earned run average; SO = Strikeouts

Player	G	W	L	SV	ERA	SO
Bud Davis	17	0	1	0	3.38	12
Jack Harper	3	0	0	0	3.12	3
Squiz Pillion	2	0	0	0	6.75	0
Bob Pepper	1	0	0	0	1.80	0

== Awards and honors ==
=== League top five finishers ===
Rube Bressler

- #2 in AL in earned runs allowed (103)

Bullet Joe Bush

- #3 in AL in wild pitches (10)

Rube Oldring

- #2 in AL in home runs (6)

Weldon Wyckoff

- AL leader in losses (22)
- AL leader in earned runs allowed (108)
- AL leader in walks allowed (165)
- AL leader in wild pitches (14)
- #3 in AL in strikeouts (157)
