= 1915 St. Louis Browns season =

Major League Baseball season

1915 St. Louis Browns
- League: American League
- Ballpark: Sportsman's Park
- City: St. Louis, Missouri
- Record: 63–91 (.409)
- League place: 6th
- Owners: Robert Hedges
- Managers: Branch Rickey

The 1915 St. Louis Browns season involved the Browns finishing 6th in the American League with a record of 63 wins and 91 losses.

== Regular season ==
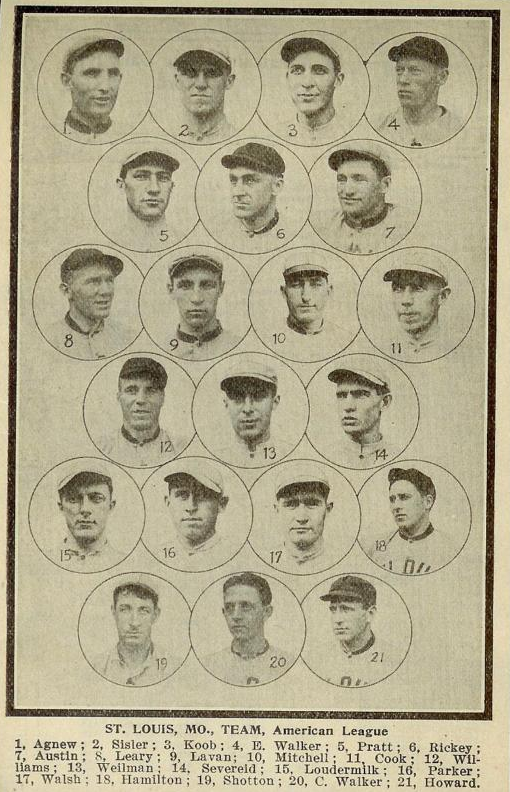
The 1915 St. Louis Browns.

=== Season standings ===
American League
| Team | W | L | Pct. | GB | Home | Road |
|---|---|---|---|---|---|---|
| Boston Red Sox | 101 | 50 | .669 | — | 55‍–‍20 | 46‍–‍30 |
| Detroit Tigers | 100 | 54 | .649 | 2½ | 51‍–‍26 | 49‍–‍28 |
| Chicago White Sox | 93 | 61 | .604 | 9½ | 54‍–‍24 | 39‍–‍37 |
| Washington Senators | 85 | 68 | .556 | 17 | 50‍–‍29 | 35‍–‍39 |
| New York Yankees | 69 | 83 | .454 | 32½ | 37‍–‍43 | 32‍–‍40 |
| St. Louis Browns | 63 | 91 | .409 | 39½ | 35‍–‍38 | 28‍–‍53 |
| Cleveland Indians | 57 | 95 | .375 | 44½ | 27‍–‍50 | 30‍–‍45 |
| Philadelphia Athletics | 43 | 109 | .283 | 58½ | 19‍–‍53 | 24‍–‍56 |

=== Record vs. opponents ===
1915 American League record Sources:
| Team | BOS | CWS | CLE | DET | NYY | PHA | SLB | WSH |
|---|---|---|---|---|---|---|---|---|
| Boston | — | 12–10 | 16–4 | 14–8 | 10–12 | 17–5–1 | 17–5–2 | 15–6–1 |
| Chicago | 10–12 | — | 16–6 | 7–15 | 15–7 | 19–3 | 18–4 | 8–14–1 |
| Cleveland | 4–16 | 6–16 | — | 5–17 | 9–13–1 | 15–7–1 | 12–10 | 6–16 |
| Detroit | 8–14 | 15–7 | 17–5 | — | 17–5 | 17–5 | 13–9–2 | 13–9 |
| New York | 12–10 | 7–15 | 13–9–1 | 5–17 | — | 11–9 | 12–10–1 | 9–13 |
| Philadelphia | 5–17–1 | 3–19 | 7–15–1 | 5–17 | 9–11 | — | 6–16 | 8–14 |
| St. Louis | 5–17–2 | 4–18 | 10–12 | 9–13–2 | 10–12–1 | 16–6 | — | 9–13 |
| Washington | 6–15–1 | 14–8–1 | 16–6 | 9–13 | 13–9 | 14–8 | 13–9 | — |

=== Roster ===
1915 St. Louis Browns
Roster
| Pitchers: George Baumgardner; Rollin Cook; Carl East; Earl Hamilton; Harry Hoch; Chet Hoff; Bill James; Ernie Koob; Walt Leverenz; Grover Lowdermilk; Tim McCabe; Reeve McKay; Jim Park; Scott Perry; Parson Perryman; Tom Phillips; Alex Remneas; Pete Sims; Allen Sothoron; Johnny Tillman; Carl Weilman | Catchers: Sam Agnew; Walt Alexander; George O'Brien; Muddy Ruel; Hank Severeid; Infielders: Jimmy Austin; Bill Dalrymple; Shorty Dee; Ivan Howard; Dick Kauffman; Doc Lavan; John Leary; Del Pratt; Ray Schmandt; George Sisler; Bobby Wallace | Outfielders: Baby Doll Jacobson; Billy Lee; Pat Parker; Burt Shotton; Ernie Walker; Tilly Walker; Dee Walsh; Gus Williams; Other batters: Chauncey Burkam | Manager: Branch Rickey |

== Player stats ==
=== Batting ===
==== Starters by position ====
Note: Pos = Position; G = Games played; AB = At bats; H = Hits; Avg. = Batting average; HR = Home runs; RBI = Runs batted in

| Pos | Player | G | AB | H | Avg. | HR | RBI |
|---|---|---|---|---|---|---|---|
| C | Sam Agnew | 104 | 295 | 60 | .203 | 0 | 19 |
| 1B | John Leary | 75 | 227 | 55 | .242 | 0 | 15 |
| 2B | Del Pratt | 159 | 602 | 175 | .291 | 3 | 78 |
| SS | Doc Lavan | 157 | 514 | 112 | .218 | 1 | 48 |
| 3B | Jimmy Austin | 141 | 477 | 127 | .266 | 1 | 30 |
| OF | Tillie Walker | 144 | 510 | 137 | .269 | 5 | 49 |
| OF | Dee Walsh | 59 | 150 | 33 | .220 | 0 | 6 |
| OF | Burt Shotton | 156 | 559 | 158 | .283 | 1 | 30 |

==== Other batters ====
Note: G = Games played; AB = At bats; H = Hits; Avg. = Batting average; HR = Home runs; RBI = Runs batted in

| Player | G | AB | H | Avg. | HR | RBI |
|---|---|---|---|---|---|---|
| Ivan Howard | 113 | 324 | 90 | .278 | 2 | 43 |
| George Sisler | 81 | 274 | 78 | .285 | 3 | 29 |
| Hank Severeid | 80 | 203 | 45 | .222 | 1 | 22 |
| Dick Kauffman | 37 | 124 | 32 | .258 | 0 | 14 |
| Gus Williams | 45 | 119 | 24 | .202 | 1 | 11 |
| Baby Doll Jacobson | 34 | 115 | 24 | .209 | 1 | 9 |
| Ernie Walker | 50 | 109 | 23 | .211 | 0 | 9 |
| Billy Lee | 18 | 59 | 11 | .186 | 0 | 4 |
| Muddy Ruel | 10 | 14 | 0 | .000 | 0 | 1 |
| Bobby Wallace | 9 | 13 | 3 | .231 | 0 | 4 |
| George O'Brien | 3 | 9 | 2 | .222 | 0 | 0 |
| Pat Parker | 3 | 6 | 1 | .167 | 0 | 1 |
| Ray Schmandt | 3 | 4 | 0 | .000 | 0 | 0 |
| Shorty Dee | 1 | 3 | 0 | .000 | 0 | 0 |
| Bill Dalrymple | 3 | 2 | 0 | .000 | 0 | 0 |
| Chauncey Burkam | 1 | 1 | 0 | .000 | 0 | 0 |
| Walt Alexander | 1 | 1 | 0 | .000 | 0 | 0 |

=== Pitching ===
==== Starting pitchers ====
Note: G = Games pitched; IP = Innings pitched; W = Wins; L = Losses; ERA = Earned run average; SO = Strikeouts

| Player | G | IP | W | L | ERA | SO |
|---|---|---|---|---|---|---|
| Carl Weilman | 47 | 295.2 | 18 | 19 | 2.34 | 125 |
| Grover Lowdermilk | 38 | 222.1 | 9 | 17 | 3.12 | 130 |
| Earl Hamilton | 35 | 204.0 | 9 | 17 | 2.87 | 63 |
| Tom Phillips | 5 | 27.1 | 1 | 3 | 2.96 | 5 |
| Jim Park | 3 | 22.2 | 2 | 0 | 1.19 | 5 |
| Carl East | 1 | 3.1 | 0 | 0 | 16.20 | 1 |
| Scott Perry | 1 | 2.0 | 0 | 0 | 13.50 | 0 |

==== Other pitchers ====
Note: G = Games pitched; IP = Innings pitched; W = Wins; L = Losses; ERA = Earned run average; SO = Strikeouts

| Player | G | IP | W | L | ERA | SO |
|---|---|---|---|---|---|---|
| Bill James | 34 | 170.1 | 6 | 10 | 3.59 | 58 |
| Ernie Koob | 28 | 133.2 | 4 | 5 | 2.36 | 37 |
| George Sisler | 15 | 70.0 | 4 | 4 | 2.83 | 41 |
| Red Hoff | 11 | 43.2 | 2 | 2 | 1.24 | 23 |
| Tim McCabe | 7 | 41.2 | 3 | 1 | 1.30 | 17 |
| Harry Hoch | 12 | 40.0 | 0 | 4 | 7.20 | 9 |
| George Baumgardner | 7 | 22.1 | 0 | 2 | 4.43 | 6 |
| Johnny Tillman | 2 | 10.0 | 1 | 0 | 0.90 | 6 |
| Walt Leverenz | 5 | 9.0 | 1 | 2 | 8.00 | 3 |
| Pete Sims | 3 | 8.1 | 1 | 0 | 4.32 | 4 |
| Allan Sothoron | 3 | 3.2 | 0 | 1 | 7.36 | 2 |

==== Relief pitchers ====
Note: G = Games pitched; W = Wins; L = Losses; SV = Saves; ERA = Earned run average; SO = Strikeouts

| Player | G | W | L | SV | ERA | SO |
|---|---|---|---|---|---|---|
| Parson Perryman | 24 | 2 | 4 | 0 | 3.93 | 19 |
| Rollin Cook | 5 | 0 | 0 | 0 | 7.24 | 7 |
| Alex Remneas | 2 | 0 | 0 | 0 | 1.50 | 5 |
| Dee Walsh | 1 | 0 | 0 | 0 | 13.50 | 0 |
| Reeve McKay | 1 | 0 | 0 | 0 | 9.00 | 0 |
