= 1915 Chicago White Sox season =

1915 Chicago White Sox
- League: American League
- Ballpark: Comiskey Park
- City: Chicago
- Record: 93–61 (.604)
- League place: 3rd
- Owners: Charles Comiskey
- Managers: Pants Rowland

The 1915 Chicago White Sox season involved the White Sox finishing third in the American League.

With the acquisitions of Eddie Collins (over the winter) and Joe Jackson (in August), Chicago now had the two hitters they needed to win the 1917 and 1919 AL pennants.

== Offseason ==
- December 8, 1914: Eddie Collins was purchased by the White Sox from the Philadelphia Athletics.

== Regular season ==
=== Season standings ===
American League
Team	W	L	Pct.	GB	Home	Road
Boston Red Sox	101	50	.669	—	55‍–‍20	46‍–‍30
Detroit Tigers	100	54	.649	2½	51‍–‍26	49‍–‍28
Chicago White Sox	93	61	.604	9½	54‍–‍24	39‍–‍37
Washington Senators	85	68	.556	17	50‍–‍29	35‍–‍39
New York Yankees	69	83	.454	32½	37‍–‍43	32‍–‍40
St. Louis Browns	63	91	.409	39½	35‍–‍38	28‍–‍53
Cleveland Indians	57	95	.375	44½	27‍–‍50	30‍–‍45
Philadelphia Athletics	43	109	.283	58½	19‍–‍53	24‍–‍56

=== Record vs. opponents ===
1915 American League record Sources:
Team	BOS	CWS	CLE	DET	NYY	PHA	SLB	WSH
Boston	—	12–10	16–4	14–8	10–12	17–5–1	17–5–2	15–6–1
Chicago	10–12	—	16–6	7–15	15–7	19–3	18–4	8–14–1
Cleveland	4–16	6–16	—	5–17	9–13–1	15–7–1	12–10	6–16
Detroit	8–14	15–7	17–5	—	17–5	17–5	13–9–2	13–9
New York	12–10	7–15	13–9–1	5–17	—	11–9	12–10–1	9–13
Philadelphia	5–17–1	3–19	7–15–1	5–17	9–11	—	6–16	8–14
St. Louis	5–17–2	4–18	10–12	9–13–2	10–12–1	16–6	—	9–13
Washington	6–15–1	14–8–1	16–6	9–13	13–9	14–8	13–9	—

=== Roster ===
1915 Chicago White Sox
Roster
Pitchers: Joe Benz; Eddie Cicotte; Dixie Davis; Red Faber; Hi Jasper; Ellis Johnson; Ed Klepfer; Reb Russell; Jim Scott; Ed Walsh; Mellie Wolfgang	Catchers: Tom Daly; Wally Mayer; Ray Schalk; Infielders: Lena Blackburne; Jim Breton; Bunny Brief; Eddie Collins; Jack Fournier; Pete Johns; Braggo Roth; Buck Weaver	Outfielders: Shano Collins; Ray Demmitt; Happy Felsch; Joe Jackson; Nemo Leibold; Eddie Murphy; Finners Quinlan; Other batters: Howard Baker; Larry Chappell; Charlie Jackson	Manager: Pants Rowland; Coaches: Kid Gleason

== Player stats ==
=== Batting ===
==== Starters by position ====
Note: Pos = Position; G = Games played; AB = At bats; H = Hits; Avg. = Batting average; HR = Home runs; RBI = Runs batted in

Pos	Player	G	AB	H	Avg.	HR	RBI
C	Ray Schalk	135	413	110	.266	1	54
1B	Jack Fournier	126	422	136	.322	5	77
2B	Eddie Collins	155	521	173	.332	4	77
3B	Lena Blackburne	96	283	61	.216	0	25
SS	Buck Weaver	148	563	151	.268	3	49
OF	Shano Collins	153	576	148	.257	2	85
OF	Happy Felsch	121	427	106	.248	3	53
OF	Eddie Murphy	70	273	86	.315	0	26

==== Other batters ====
Note: G = Games played; AB = At bats; H = Hits; Avg. = Batting average; HR = Home runs; RBI = Runs batted in

Player	G	AB	H	Avg.	HR	RBI
Braggo Roth	70	240	60	.250	3	35
Joe Jackson	45	158	43	.272	2	36
Bunny Brief	48	154	33	.214	2	17
Finners Quinlan	42	114	22	.193	0	7
Pete Johns	28	100	21	.210	0	11
Nemo Leibold	36	74	17	.230	0	11
Wally Mayer	64	54	12	.222	0	5
Tom Daly	29	47	9	.191	0	3
Jim Breton	16	36	5	.139	0	1
Ray Demmitt	9	6	0	.000	0	0
Howard Baker	2	2	0	.000	0	0
Charlie Jackson	1	1	0	.000	0	0
Larry Chappell	1	1	0	.000	0	0

=== Pitching ===
==== Starting pitchers ====
Note: G = Games pitched; IP = Innings pitched; W = Wins; L = Losses; ERA = Earned run average; SO = Strikeouts

Player	G	IP	W	L	ERA	SO
Red Faber	50	299.2	24	14	2.55	182
Jim Scott	48	296.1	24	11	2.03	120
Joe Benz	39	238.1	15	11	2.11	81
Eddie Cicotte	39	223.1	13	12	3.02	106
Ed Walsh	3	27.0	3	0	1.33	12

==== Other pitchers ====
Note: G = Games pitched; IP = Innings pitched; W = Wins; L = Losses; ERA = Earned run average; SO = Strikeouts

Player	G	IP	W	L	ERA	SO
Reb Russell	41	229.1	11	10	2.59	90
Hi Jasper	3	15.2	0	1	4.60	15
Ed Klepfer	3	12.2	1	0	2.84	3

==== Relief pitchers ====
Note: G = Games pitched; W = Wins; L = Losses; SV = Saves; ERA = Earned run average; SO = Strikeouts

Player	G	W	L	SV	ERA	SO
Mellie Wolfgang	17	2	2	0	1.84	21
Dixie Davis	2	0	0	0	0.00	2
Ellis Johnson	1	0	0	0	9.00	3

== Awards and honors ==
=== League top five finishers ===
Eddie Collins

- #2 in AL in batting average (.332)
- #2 in AL in on-base percentage (.460)
- #2 in AL in runs scored (118)
- #3 in AL in stolen bases (46)
- #4 in AL in RBI (85)

Red Faber

- #2 in AL in wins (24)
- #2 in AL in strikeouts (182)

Jack Fournier

- AL leader in slugging percentage (.491)
- #3 in AL in batting average (.322)
- #3 in AL in on-base percentage (.429)

Jim Scott

- #2 in AL in wins (24)
- #4 in AL in ERA (2.03)
