= Joe Sherman (baseball) =

American baseball player (1890–1987)

- Pitcher
- Born: November 4, 1890; Yarmouth, Massachusetts, U.S.
- Died: December 21, 1987 (aged 97); Cape Coral, Florida, U.S.
- Batted: Right Threw: Right

MLB debut
- September 24, 1915, for the Philadelphia Athletics

Last MLB appearance
- September 30, 1915, for the Philadelphia Athletics

MLB statistics
- Innings pitched: 15
- Win–loss record: 1–0
- Earned run average: 2.40
- Stats at Baseball Reference

Teams
- Philadelphia Athletics (1915)

Joel Powers Sherman (November 4, 1890 – December 21, 1987) was an American professional baseball pitcher. He played in Major League Baseball for the Philadelphia Athletics in 1915.

== Biography ==
A native of Yarmouth, Massachusetts, Sherman attended Barnstable High School, where he and his brother Fred played together on the school's football and baseball teams. Sherman went on to attend the University of Massachusetts Amherst, which was known at the time as "Massachusetts Agricultural College". There he played college baseball, and in 1914 was part of a team that featured three future major leaguers in Sherman, Chick Davies, and Lee King.

Sherman began his professional baseball career in 1915, pitching for the Jersey City Skeeters of the International League, where he posted an 11-11 record over 203.2 innings of work. In late September, Sherman was called to the major leagues to join Connie Mack's Philadelphia Athletics. The A's had won the American League pennant in 1914, but had dropped to last place in a historically bad 1915 season.

Sherman's major league debut came on September 24 in the second game of a doubleheader against the Chicago White Sox at Shibe Park. The A's lineup that day featured Baseball Hall of Famer Nap Lajoie at second base, and the White Sox lineup featured another Hall of Fame second baseman in Eddie Collins, as well as Shoeless Joe Jackson in left field. A's starter Tink Turner had lasted only two innings and allowed six runs. Turner had been relieved by Cap Crowell, who pitched the third inning and allowed another five runs. Down 11-0 after three, Mack brought in Sherman for the fourth. Sherman proceeded to pitch the final six innings, allowing only one run on four hits as Philadelphia was downed, 12-5. Sherman came to the plate three times, but did not reach base.

Sherman's second and final major league appearance came six days later on September 30, as the A's visited Griffith Stadium for a game with the Washington Senators. Sherman was the star of the game, as he got the start on the mound against Washington's Harry Harper and went the distance, allowing only one walk, and scattering 11 hits in Philadelphia's 4-3 win. At the plate, Sherman was the lone Athletic with a multi-hit day, recording two singles with a walk and one RBI in four plate appearances.

Sherman returned to the International League in 1916, playing for the Baltimore Orioles, where he posted a 19-16 record in 265 innings on the mound, and boasted a .270 batting average. He returned to Baltimore in 1917, then played for the Hartford Senators of the Eastern League in 1919 and 1920, but never returned to the majors. In his two-game major league career, Sherman posted an impressive 2.40 ERA in 15 innings with one victory on the mound, and a .333 batting average in seven plate appearances.

A Cape Cod native, Sherman pitched for the Hyannis town team in the Cape Cod Baseball League for many seasons. As a young man, he had played for the team from 1906 to 1913, prior to the formal organization of the Cape League in 1923. Then after a 14-year hiatus he returned to play again for Hyannis in the newly-formed league from 1927 to 1931. Sherman's long career with Hyannis, predating even the league itself, accounts for his being referred to by some as the "father of the [Cape] league."

Sherman married Ethel Hossman, a music instructor from Barnstable, and went on to teach and coach at Westerly High School in Westerly, Rhode Island. He died in 1987 in Cape Coral, Florida at the age of 97.
