= Damrau =

Damrau is a surname. Notable people with the surname include:

- Diana Damrau (born 1971), German opera singer
- Harry Damrau (1890–1957), American baseball player
