= Harry Eccles =

American baseball player (1893-1955)

- Pitcher
- Born: July 9, 1893; Kennedy, New York
- Died: June 2, 1955 (aged 61); Jamestown, New York
- Batted: Left Threw: Left

MLB debut
- September 13, 1915, for the Philadelphia Athletics

Last MLB appearance
- September 27, 1915, for the Philadelphia Athletics

MLB statistics
- Win–loss record: 0–1
- Earned run average: 4.71
- Strikeouts: 13
- Stats at Baseball Reference

Teams
- Philadelphia Athletics (1915)

Harry Josiah Eccles (July 9, 1893 – June 2, 1955), nicknamed "Bugs", was an American professional baseball pitcher. He appeared in five games for the Philadelphia Athletics of Major League Baseball during the 1915 season, with his only major league decision coming in what would also prove his only start, in his final appearance, against the Chicago White Sox on September 27, allowing all six runs over three innings in the 6–5 defeat. Eccles would go on to appear in the International League in 1916, compiling a mark of 3-3, but never appear in professional baseball thereafter.
