= Pete Sims =

Pete Sims may refer to:

- Pete La Roca (Pete Sims, 1938–2012), American jazz drummer
- Pete Sims (baseball) (1891–1968), Major League Baseball pitcher
