= Jack Fournier =

American baseball player (1889–1973)

- First baseman
- Born: September 28, 1889; Au Sable, Michigan, U.S.
- Died: September 5, 1973 (aged 83); Tacoma, Washington, U.S.
- Batted: Left Threw: Right

MLB debut
- April 13, 1912, for the Chicago White Sox

Last MLB appearance
- October 2, 1927, for the Boston Braves

MLB statistics
- Batting average: .313
- Home runs: 136
- Runs batted in: 859
- Stats at Baseball Reference

Teams
- Chicago White Sox (1912–1917); New York Yankees (1918); St. Louis Cardinals (1920–1922); Brooklyn Robins (1923–1926); Boston Braves (1927)

Career highlights and awards
- NL home run leader (1924)

John Frank Fournier (September 28, 1889 – September 5, 1973) was an American professional baseball first baseman. He played in Major League Baseball (MLB) for the Chicago White Sox, New York Yankees, St. Louis Cardinals, Brooklyn Robins, and Boston Braves from 1912 to 1927. Fournier was known for having outstanding batting abilities but subpar fielding abilities.

== MLB career ==
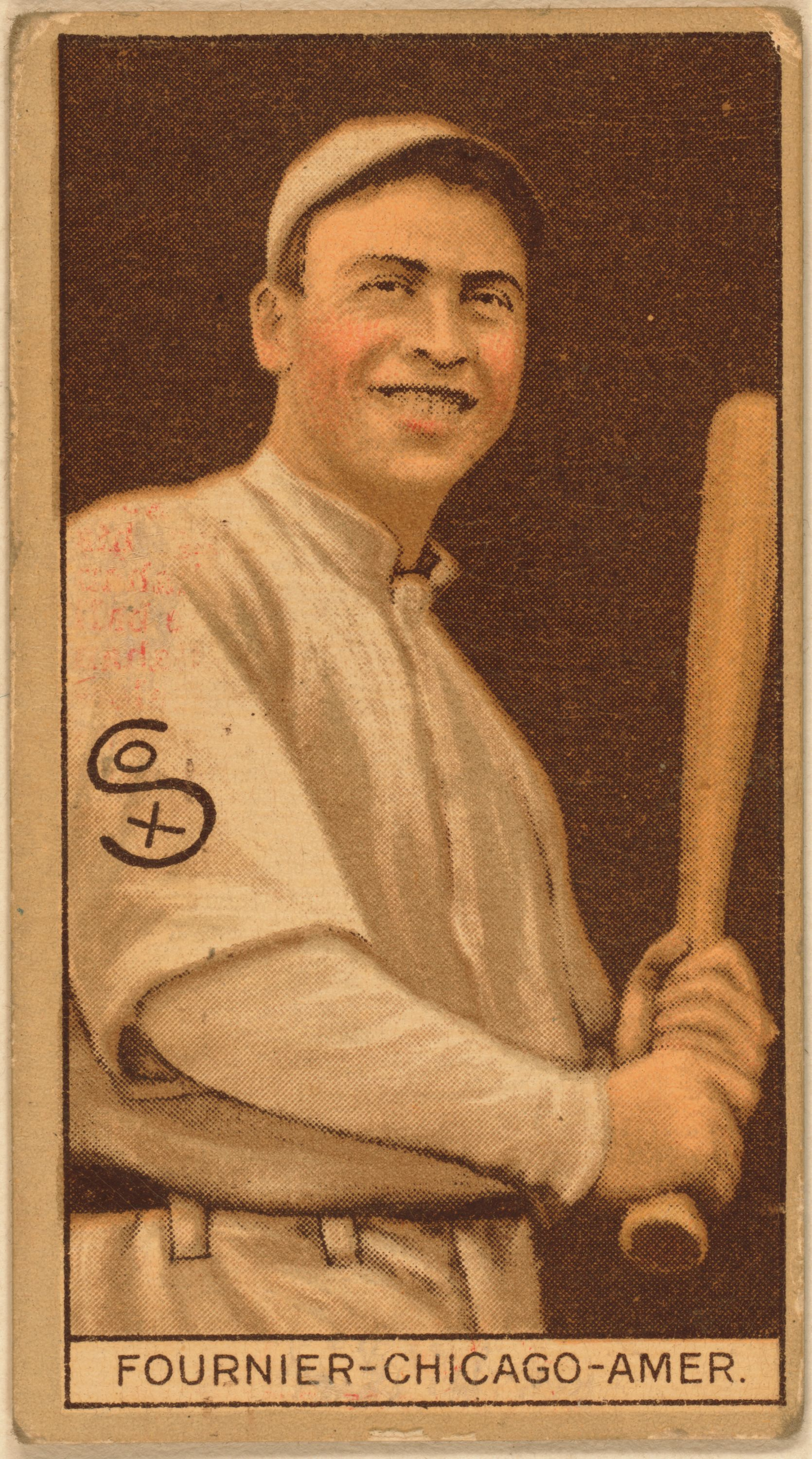
1912 baseball card of Fournier

When purchased by the White Sox from the Boston Red Sox in 1912, Fournier presented Pants Rowland and a half-dozen other managers with the dilemma of what to do with his pure hitting, but poor fielding abilities. Rowland solved that problem in 1916, a year after Fournier had led the AL in slugging, by replacing him at first base with the marginal Jack Ness. Before 1920, a first baseman was one of the key fielding positions because of the constant threat of the bunt; Fournier could not field the bunt.

Fournier hit .350 for the Yankees in limited duty in 1918 before they passed him off to the Cardinals. In 1921, he finished 3rd in the league with a .343 batting average while scoring a career-best 103 runs. After three productive years in St. Louis, Fournier was dealt to Brooklyn on February 15, 1923. Fournier said he would quit the game rather than leave St. Louis, but he eventually ended his holdout and reported to the Dodgers. Fournier had found his spot, among an offensive unit that included Zack Wheat, Milt Stock, and Zack Taylor. He turned in a six-for-six performance on June 29 of that year, hit .351, though committing a league-high 21 errors. In 1924, Fournier led the NL with 27 home runs and was second in the league with 116 runs batted in. He led the National League with 86 walks in 1925, batting .350 and finishing second in the league to Rogers Hornsby in both RBIs (130) and on-base percentage (.446, still the third-highest total in Dodgers history).

Fournier hit 136 career home runs in 14 seasons while batting .313 with a .392 on-base percentage and .483 slugging percentage. He also racked up three straight seasons (1923–1925) with 20+ home runs, 20+ doubles, a .400 or higher on-base percentage, a .330 plus batting average, and 90+ runs. Bill James ranked him as the 35th best first baseman of all time.

== Post-playing career ==
Following his playing career, Fournier was the head coach at UCLA from 1934 to 1936. He later scouted for the St. Louis Browns (1938–1942, 1944–1949), Chicago Cubs (1950–1957), Detroit Tigers (1960), and Cincinnati Reds (1961–1962).

== See also ==
- List of Major League Baseball career batting average leaders
- List of Major League Baseball career triples leaders
- List of Major League Baseball annual home run leaders
- List of Major League Baseball single-game hits leaders
