= Pete Shields =

American baseball player (1891–1961)

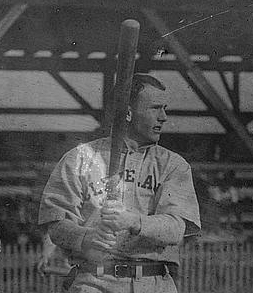
- First baseman
- Born: September 21, 1891; Swiftwater, Mississippi, U.S.
- Died: February 11, 1961 (aged 69); Jackson, Mississippi, U.S.
- Batted: Right Threw: Right

MLB debut
- April 14, 1915, for the Cleveland Indians

Last MLB appearance
- May 16, 1915, for the Cleveland Indians

MLB statistics
- Hits: 15
- Batting average: .208
- Stolen bases: 3
- Stats at Baseball Reference

Teams
- Cleveland Indians (1915)

Francis Leroy "Pete" Shields (September 21, 1891 – February 11, 1961) was an American Major League Baseball first baseman who played for one season. He played in 23 games for the Cleveland Indians during the 1915 season. Shields attended the University of Mississippi, where he played both football and baseball.
