= 1915 Cleveland Indians season =

1915 Cleveland Indians
- League: American League
- Ballpark: League Park II
- City: Cleveland, Ohio
- Record: 57–95 (.375)
- League place: 7th
- Owners: Charles Somers
- Managers: Joe Birmingham, Lee Fohl

The 1915 Cleveland Indians season was a season in American baseball, and the club's first under the new name "Indians". The team finished seventh in the American League with a record of 57–95, 44½ games behind the Boston Red Sox.

== Offseason ==
- January 1915: Nap Lajoie was purchased from the Indians by the Philadelphia Athletics.

== Regular season ==
=== Season standings ===
American League
Team	W	L	Pct.	GB	Home	Road
Boston Red Sox	101	50	.669	—	55‍–‍20	46‍–‍30
Detroit Tigers	100	54	.649	2½	51‍–‍26	49‍–‍28
Chicago White Sox	93	61	.604	9½	54‍–‍24	39‍–‍37
Washington Senators	85	68	.556	17	50‍–‍29	35‍–‍39
New York Yankees	69	83	.454	32½	37‍–‍43	32‍–‍40
St. Louis Browns	63	91	.409	39½	35‍–‍38	28‍–‍53
Cleveland Indians	57	95	.375	44½	27‍–‍50	30‍–‍45
Philadelphia Athletics	43	109	.283	58½	19‍–‍53	24‍–‍56

=== Record vs. opponents ===
1915 American League record Sources:
Team	BOS	CWS	CLE	DET	NYY	PHA	SLB	WSH
Boston	—	12–10	16–4	14–8	10–12	17–5–1	17–5–2	15–6–1
Chicago	10–12	—	16–6	7–15	15–7	19–3	18–4	8–14–1
Cleveland	4–16	6–16	—	5–17	9–13–1	15–7–1	12–10	6–16
Detroit	8–14	15–7	17–5	—	17–5	17–5	13–9–2	13–9
New York	12–10	7–15	13–9–1	5–17	—	11–9	12–10–1	9–13
Philadelphia	5–17–1	3–19	7–15–1	5–17	9–11	—	6–16	8–14
St. Louis	5–17–2	4–18	10–12	9–13–2	10–12–1	16–6	—	9–13
Washington	6–15–1	14–8–1	16–6	9–13	13–9	14–8	13–9	—

=== Roster ===
1915 Cleveland Indians
Roster
Pitchers: Abe Bowman; Lynn Brenton; Paul Carter; Allan Collamore; Fritz Coumbe; Clarence Garrett; Rip Hagerman; Oscar Harstad; Herbert Hill; Sam Jones; Ed Klepfer; Willie Mitchell; Guy Morton; Bill Steen; Roy Walker	Catchers: Josh Billings; Ben Egan; Howie Haworth; Steve O'Neill; Infielders: Walter Barbare; Ray Chapman; Joe Evans; Jack Hammond; Tex Hoffman; Jay Kirke; Bill Rodgers; Pete Shields; Terry Turner; Bill Wambsganss; Roy Wood	Outfielders: Jim Eschen; Jack Graney; Joe Jackson; Nemo Leibold; Braggo Roth; Elmer Smith; Billy Southworth; Denney Wilie; Other positions: Lee Gooch; Ben Paschal	Manager: Joe Birmingham; Lee Fohl

== Player stats ==
=== Batting ===
==== Starters by position ====
Note: Pos = Position; G = Games played; AB = At bats; H = Hits; Avg. = Batting average; HR = Home runs; RBI = Runs batted in

Pos	Player	G	AB	H	Avg.	HR	RBI
C	Steve O'Neill	121	386	91	.236	2	34
1B	Jay Kirke	87	339	105	.310	2	40
2B	Bill Wambsganss	121	375	73	.195	0	21
SS	Ray Chapman	154	570	154	.270	3	67
3B	Walter Barbare	77	246	47	.191	0	11
OF	Elmer Smith	144	476	118	.248	3	67
OF	Jack Graney	116	404	105	.260	1	56
OF	Nemo Leibold	57	207	53	.256	0	4

==== Other batters ====
Note: G = Games played; AB = At bats; H = Hits; Avg. = Batting average; HR = Home runs; RBI = Runs batted in

Player	G	AB	H	Avg.	HR	RBI
Joe Jackson	83	303	99	.327	3	45
Terry Turner	75	262	66	.252	0	14
Billy Southworth	60	177	39	.220	0	8
Braggo Roth	39	144	43	.299	4	20
Denney Wilie	45	131	33	.252	2	10
Ben Egan	42	120	13	.108	0	6
Joe Evans	42	109	28	.257	0	11
Jack Hammond	35	84	18	.214	0	4
Ron Wood	33	78	15	.192	0	3
Pete Shields	23	72	15	.208	0	6
Bill Rodgers	16	45	14	.311	0	7
Jim Eschen	15	42	10	.238	0	2
Josh Billings	8	21	4	.190	0	0
Tex Hoffman	9	13	2	.154	0	2
Ben Paschal	9	9	1	.111	0	0
Howie Haworth	7	7	1	.143	0	1
Lee Gooch	2	2	1	.500	0	0

=== Pitching ===
==== Starting pitchers ====
Note: G = Games pitched; IP = Innings pitched; W = Wins; L = Losses; ERA = Earned run average; SO = Strikeouts

Player	G	IP	W	L	ERA	SO
Guy Morton	34	240.0	16	15	2.14	134
Willie Mitchell	36	236.0	11	14	2.82	149
Rip Hagerman	29	151.0	6	14	3.52	69
Ed Klepfer	8	43.0	1	6	2.09	13
Clarence Garrett	4	23.1	2	2	2.31	5

==== Other pitchers ====
Note: G = Games pitched; IP = Innings pitched; W = Wins; L = Losses; ERA = Earned run average; SO = Strikeouts

Player	G	IP	W	L	ERA	SO
Sad Sam Jones	48	145.2	4	9	3.65	42
Roy Walker	25	131.0	4	9	3.98	57
Fritz Coumbe	30	114.0	4	7	3.47	37
Oscar Harstad	32	82.0	3	5	3.40	35
Allan Collamore	11	64.1	2	5	2.38	15
Lynn Brenton	11	51.0	2	3	3.35	18
Bill Steen	10	45.1	1	4	4.96	22
Paul Carter	11	42.0	1	1	3.21	14
Abe Bowman	2	1.1	0	1	20.25	0

==== Relief pitchers ====
Note: G = Games pitched; W = Wins; L = Losses; SV = Saves; ERA = Earned run average; SO = Strikeouts

Player	G	W	L	SV	ERA	SO
Herbert Hill	1	0	0	0	0.00	0
