= Clarence Garrett =

American baseball player (1891–1977)

- Pitcher
- Born: March 6, 1891; Reader, West Virginia, U.S.
- Died: February 1, 1977 (aged 85); Moundsville, West Virginia, U.S.
- Batted: Right Threw: Right

MLB debut
- September 13, 1915, for the Cleveland Indians

Last MLB appearance
- September 29, 1915, for the Cleveland Indians

MLB statistics
- Win–loss record: 2–2
- Earned run average: 2.31
- Strikeouts: 5
- Stats at Baseball Reference

Teams
- Cleveland Indians (1915)

Clarence Raymond Garrett (March 6, 1891 – February 11, 1977) was an American Major League Baseball pitcher who played for one season. Nicknamed "Laz", he pitched four games for the Cleveland Indians during the 1915 Cleveland Indians season. He went to school at West Liberty State College.
