= Howie Haworth =

American baseball player (1893–1953)

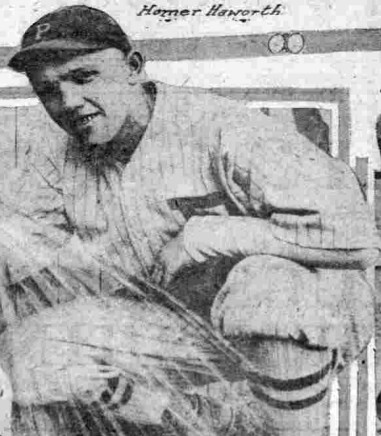
- Catcher
- Born: August 27, 1893; Newberg, Oregon, U.S.
- Died: January 28, 1953 (aged 59); Troutdale, Oregon, U.S.
- Batted: Left Threw: Right

MLB debut
- August 14, 1915, for the Cleveland Indians

Last MLB appearance
- August 28, 1915, for the Cleveland Indians

MLB statistics
- Batting average: .143
- Home runs: 0
- Runs batted in: 1
- Stats at Baseball Reference

Teams
- Cleveland Indians (1915)

Career highlights and awards

Homer Howard Haworth (August 27, 1893 – January 28, 1953) was an American Major League Baseball catcher who played for one season. He played seven games for the Cleveland Indians during the 1915 Cleveland Indians season.
