= Tex Hoffman =

American baseball player (1893–1947)

- Third baseman
- Born: November 30, 1893; San Antonio, Texas, U.S.
- Died: May 19, 1947 (aged 53); New Orleans, Louisiana, U.S.
- Batted: Left Threw: Right

MLB debut
- July 11, 1915, for the Cleveland Indians

Last MLB appearance
- July 20, 1915, for the Cleveland Indians

MLB statistics
- Batting average: .154
- Home runs: 0
- Runs scored: 1
- Stats at Baseball Reference

Teams
- Cleveland Indians (1915)

Edward Adolph Hoffman (November 30, 1893 – May 19, 1947) was an American Major League Baseball third baseman who played for one season. He played in nine games for the Cleveland Indians during the 1915 Cleveland Indians season. His minor league career lasted through 1935, after which he managed in the minor leagues from 1935–1937 for the Tallahassee, Florida team in the Georgia–Florida League.
