= Herbert Hill (baseball) =

American baseball player (1891–1970)

- Pitcher
- Born: August 19, 1891; Dallas, Texas, U.S.
- Died: September 2, 1970 (aged 79); Farmer's Branch, Texas, U.S.
- Batted: Right Threw: Right

MLB debut
- July 17, 1915, for the Cleveland Indians

Last MLB appearance
- July 17, 1915, for the Cleveland Indians

MLB statistics
- Win–loss record: 0–0
- Earned run average: 0.00
- Strikeouts: 0
- Stats at Baseball Reference

Teams
- Cleveland Indians (1915)

Herbert Lee Hill (August 19, 1891 – September 1, 1970) was an American Major League Baseball pitcher who played for one season. He pitched in one game for the Cleveland Indians on July 17 during the 1915 Cleveland Indians season, pitching two innings.
