= Bob Pepper (baseball) =

American baseball player (1895–1968)

- Pitcher
- Born: May 3, 1895; Rosston, Pennsylvania, U.S.
- Died: April 8, 1968 (aged 72); Ford Cliff, Pennsylvania, U.S.
- Batted: Right Threw: Right

MLB debut
- July 23, 1915, for the Philadelphia Athletics

Last MLB appearance
- July 23, 1915, for the Philadelphia Athletics

MLB statistics
- Win–loss record: 0-0
- Earned run average: 1.80
- Strikeouts: 0
- Stats at Baseball Reference

Teams
- Philadelphia Athletics (1915)

Robert Ernest Pepper (May 3, 1895 – April 8, 1968) was an American pitcher in Major League Baseball. He played one game for the Philadelphia Athletics in 1915.
