= Sam McConnell (third baseman) =

American baseball player

- Third baseman
- Born: June 8, 1895; Philadelphia, Pennsylvania, U.S.
- Died: June 27, 1981 (aged 86); Phoenixville, Pennsylvania, U.S.
- Batted: Left Threw: Right

MLB debut
- April 19, 1915, for the Philadelphia Athletics

Last MLB appearance
- May 17, 1915, for the Philadelphia Athletics

MLB statistics
- Batting average: .182
- Doubles: 1
- Runs scored: 1
- Stats at Baseball Reference

Teams
- Philadelphia Athletics (1915)

Samuel Faulkner McConnell (June 8, 1895 – June 27, 1981) was an American professional baseball player. He played in Major League Baseball for the Philadelphia Athletics during the 1915 season, primarily as a third baseman.
