= Reeve McKay =

American baseball player (1881-1946)

- Pitcher
- Born: November 16, 1881; Morgan, Texas, U.S.
- Died: January 18, 1946 (aged 64); Dallas, Texas, U.S.
- Batted: Right Threw: Right

MLB debut
- October 2, 1915, for the St. Louis Browns

Last MLB appearance
- October 2, 1915, for the St. Louis Browns

MLB statistics
- Games: 1
- Earned run average: 9.00
- Strikeouts: 0
- Stats at Baseball Reference

Teams
- St. Louis Browns (1915)

Reeve Stewart "Rip" McKay (November 26, 1881 – January 18, 1946) was an American Major League Baseball pitcher who played in one game for the St. Louis Browns on October 2, 1915.
