= Jack Harper (1915 pitcher) =

American baseball player (1893-1927)

- Pitcher
- Born: August 5, 1893; Hendricks, West Virginia, U.S.
- Died: June 18, 1927 (aged 33); Halstead, Kansas, U.S.
- Batted: Right Threw: Right

MLB debut
- April 17, 1915, for the Philadelphia Athletics

Last MLB appearance
- April 26, 1915, for the Philadelphia Athletics

MLB statistics
- Win–loss record: 0–0
- Strikeouts: 3
- Earned run average: 3.12
- Stats at Baseball Reference

Teams
- Philadelphia Athletics (1915)

John Wesley Harper (August 5, 1893 – June 18, 1927) was an American pitcher in Major League Baseball. He pitched in three games for the Philadelphia Athletics in 1915.

He was born in Hendricks, West Virginia, and died in Halstead, Kansas.

== Sources ==
- Career statistics from Baseball Reference · Baseball Reference (Minors) · Retrosheet · Baseball Almanac
