= Bruno Haas =

American baseball player (1891-1952)

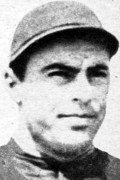
- Pitcher
- Born: May 5, 1891; Worcester, Massachusetts, U.S.
- Died: June 5, 1952 (aged 61); Sarasota, Florida, U.S.
- Batted: Switch Threw: Left

MLB debut
- June 23, 1915, for the Philadelphia Athletics

Last MLB appearance
- September 18, 1915, for the Philadelphia Athletics

MLB statistics
- Win–loss record: 0–1
- Strikeouts: 7
- Earned run average: 11.93
- Stats at Baseball Reference

Teams
- Philadelphia Athletics (1915)
American football career
Bruno Haas
Profile
- Position: Back
Personal information
- Listed height: 5 ft 10 in (1.78 m)
- Listed weight: 180 lb (82 kg)
Career information
- High school: Worcester Technical High School (Worcester, Massachusetts)
Career history
- Akron Pros (1921); Cleveland Indians (1921); Dayton Triangles (1922)
Career statistics
- Receiving touchdowns: 2
- Stats at Pro Football Reference

Bruno Philip Haas (May 5, 1891 – June 5, 1952) was an American Major League Baseball pitcher, minor league baseball executive, and a professional football player in the National Football League (NFL). His baseball career lasted 37 years.

At Worcester Academy, he met Roy McGillicuddy, the son of Connie Mack, and a month after his graduation, he joined the Philadelphia Athletics. He is most remembered for setting an American League record (tying the major league record held by Bill George and George Van Haltren) for most batters walked in one game with 15. He did this in his major league debut on June 23, 1915 for the Philadelphia Athletics. Following his inauspicious debut, Haas pitched in just five more major league games, all in 1915. He played in six other games, three as an outfielder and three as a pinch-hitter.

Haas is one only a few athletes to have played in both Major League Baseball and the NFL. Haas also played tailback in the NFL with the Akron Pros, Cleveland Indians and Dayton Triangles.

After his major league baseball career, Haas continued to play in the minor leagues until 1938, including a twelve-year stint with the St. Paul Saints from 1920 until 1931, during which he mostly played in the outfield. In 1933, he helped to found the fourth incarnation of the Northern League, joining the Winnipeg Maroons for the rest of his playing career. He also managed the Maroons from 1933 to 1935.

After his retirement as a player, Haas continued to work in baseball. He managed a number of different teams between 1939 and 1950, and in 1951 he returned to the Athletics to work as a scout. Haas married Martha of Sarasota, Florida. He had one daughter, Gloria. He died on June 5, 1952. He was buried in Hope Cemetery in Worcester.

== Sources ==
- Career statistics from Baseball Reference · Baseball Reference (Minors) · Retrosheet · Baseball Almanac
- Pro Football Reference: Bruno Haas
