= Charlie Jackson (baseball) =

American baseball player (1894–1968)

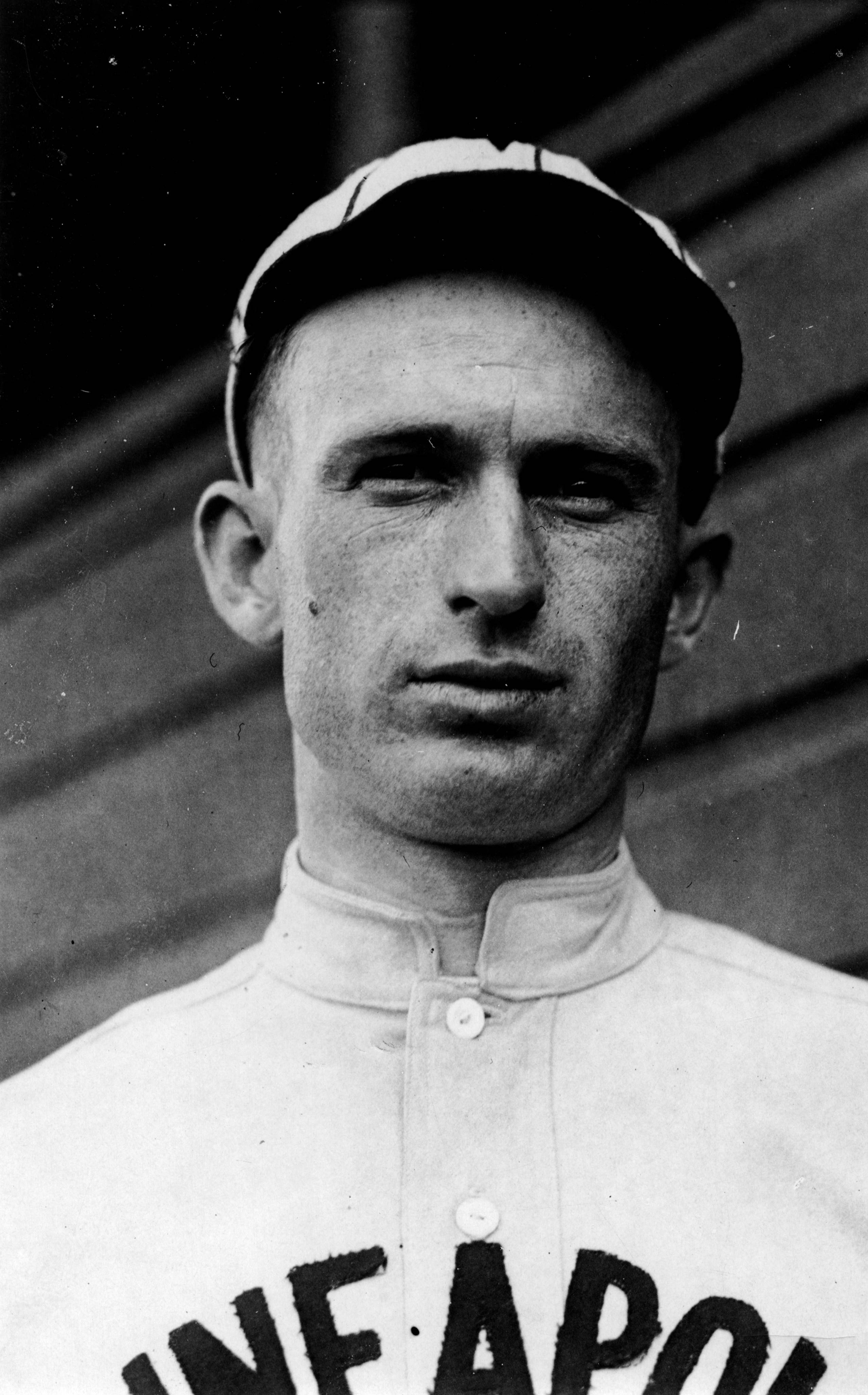
- Outfielder
- Born: February 7, 1894; Granite City, Illinois
- Died: May 27, 1968 (aged 74); Radford, Virginia
- Batted: Left Threw: Left

MLB debut
- August 20, 1915, for the Chicago White Sox

Last MLB appearance
- September 26, 1917, for the Pittsburgh Pirates

MLB statistics
- Batting average: .238
- Home runs: 0
- Runs batted in: 1
- Stats at Baseball Reference

Teams
- Chicago White Sox (1915); Pittsburgh Pirates (1917)

Charles Herbert "Lefty" Jackson (February 7, 1894 – May 27, 1968) was an outfielder in Major League Baseball. He played for the Chicago White Sox and Pittsburgh Pirates.

Jackson had been playing for the Bloomington Bloomers until his contract was sold to the Chicago White Sox in August 1915. He made his debut on August 20, 1915 as a pinch hitter for Lena Blackburne. He swung and missed at three pitches. He was returned to the Bloomers the following week after the White Sox acquired another outfielder named "Jackson": Shoeless Joe.

Jackson spent 1916 playing in Los Angeles and was slated to begin 1917 with the team too but was struck by malaria and sold to the Spokane team of the Northwestern League. Jackson was playing well in Spokane until the league disbanded and he was picked up by the Pittsburgh Pirates in August 1917. He so impressed manager Hugo Bezdek that he was assigned to the leadoff spot in the lineup and Lee King was forced to the bench.
