= Henry Bostick =

American baseball player (1895-1968)

- Third baseman
- Born: January 12, 1895; Boston, Massachusetts, U.S.
- Died: September 16, 1968 (aged 73); Denver, Colorado, U.S.
- Batted: Right Threw: Right

MLB debut
- May 18, 1915, for the Philadelphia Athletics

Last MLB appearance
- May 19, 1915, for the Philadelphia Athletics

MLB statistics
- Batting average: .000
- Home runs: 0
- Runs batted in: 2
- Stats at Baseball Reference

Teams
- Philadelphia Athletics (1915)

Henry Landers Bostick (born Henry Lipschitz) (January 12, 1895 – September 16, 1968) was an American Jewish Major League Baseball infielder who attended the University of Denver. He played for the Philadelphia Athletics during the 1915 season.
