= Chauncey Burkam =

American baseball player (1892–1964)

- Pinch hitter
- Born: October 13, 1892; Benton Harbor, Michigan
- Died: May 9, 1964 (aged 71); Kalamazoo, Michigan
- Batted: Left Threw: Right

MLB debut
- June 24, 1915, for the St. Louis Browns

Last MLB appearance
- June 24, 1915, for the St. Louis Browns

MLB statistics
- Games played: 1
- At bats: 1
- Hits: 0 (foul ball)
- Stats at Baseball Reference

Teams
- St. Louis Browns (1915)

Chauncey DePew Burkam (October 13, 1892 – May 9, 1964) was a pinch hitter in Major League Baseball. He played one game for the St. Louis Browns in 1915 and struck out in his only at bat.
