= Owen Conway =

American baseball player (1889-1942)

- Third baseman
- Born: October 23, 1889; Willow Creek, New Mexico Territory, U.S.
- Died: March 12, 1942 (aged 52); Philadelphia, Pennsylvania, U.S.
- Batted: Unknown Threw: Right

MLB debut
- June 21, 1915, for the Philadelphia Athletics

Last MLB appearance
- June 23, 1915, for the Philadelphia Athletics

MLB statistics
- Batting average: .067
- Home runs: 0
- Runs batted in: 0
- Stats at Baseball Reference

Teams
- Philadelphia Athletics (1915)

Owen Sylvester Conway (October 23, 1890 – March 12, 1942) was an American Major League Baseball infielder. He played for the Philadelphia Athletics during the 1915 season.
