= Dee Walsh =

American baseball player (1890-1971)

- Outfielder/Shortstop
- Born: March 28, 1890; St. Louis, Missouri, US
- Died: July 14, 1971 (aged 81); St. Louis, Missouri, US
- Batted: Both Threw: Right

MLB debut
- April 10, 1913, for the St. Louis Browns

Last MLB appearance
- August 24, 1915, for the St. Louis Browns

MLB statistics
- Batting average: .195
- Hits: 44
- Stats at Baseball Reference

Teams
- St. Louis Browns (1913–1915)

Leo Thomas "Dee" Walsh (March 28, 1890 – July 14, 1971) was a Major League Baseball outfielder and shortstop who played for three seasons. He played for the St. Louis Browns from 1913 to 1915, playing in 89 career games.
