= Bill Bankston =

American baseball player (1893-1970)

- Outfielder
- Born: May 25, 1893; Barnesville, Georgia, U.S.
- Died: February 26, 1970 (aged 76); Griffin, Georgia, U.S.
- Batted: Left Threw: Right

MLB debut
- August 5, 1915, for the Philadelphia Athletics

Last MLB appearance
- September 27, 1915, for the Philadelphia Athletics

MLB statistics
- Batting average: .139
- Home runs: 1
- Runs batted in: 2
- Stats at Baseball Reference

Teams
- Philadelphia Athletics (1915)

Wilborn Everett Bankston (May 25, 1893 – February 26, 1970) was an American Major League Baseball outfielder. He played for the Philadelphia Athletics during the 1915 season.
