= Pat Parker (baseball) =

American baseball player (1893-1967)

- Right fielder
- Born: May 22, 1893; Somerville, Massachusetts, U.S.
- Died: March 21, 1967 (aged 73); Claremont, New Hampshire, U.S.
- Batted: Right Threw: Right

MLB debut
- August 10, 1915, for the St. Louis Browns

Last MLB appearance
- August 11, 1915, for the St. Louis Browns

MLB statistics
- Games played: 3
- At bats: 6
- Hit(s): 1
- Stats at Baseball Reference

Teams
- St. Louis Browns (1915)

Clarence Perkins "Pat" Parker (May 22, 1893 – March 21, 1967) was an American Major League Baseball right fielder who played for the St. Louis Browns in 1915. He did not play much in the majors, only playing in three games in 1915. He made six plate appearances, going 1-6 (.167), with three strikeouts. He did not make an error in his three games.

He is in a selected group of players to play at Wahconah Park and go on to play in the Majors.
