= Lew Malone =

American baseball player (1897-1972)

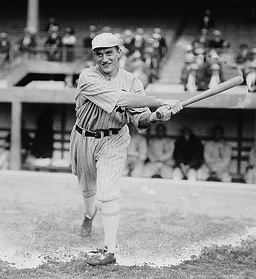
- Infielder
- Born: March 13, 1897; Baltimore, Maryland, U.S.
- Died: February 17, 1972 (aged 74); Brooklyn, New York, U.S.
- Batted: Right Threw: Right

MLB debut
- May 31, 1915, for the Philadelphia Athletics

Last MLB appearance
- September 27, 1919, for the Brooklyn Robins

MLB statistics
- Batting average: .202
- Home runs: 1
- Runs batted in: 28
- Stats at Baseball Reference

Teams
- Philadelphia Athletics (1915–1916); Brooklyn Robins (1917, 1919)

Lewis Aloysius Malone (March 13, 1897 – February 17, 1972) was an American professional baseball infielder. He played in Major League Baseball (MLB) from 1915 to 1919 for the Philadelphia Athletics and Brooklyn Robins. In 1918 Malone's career was interrupted while he served in World War I. After returning from World War I, Malone continued to play in the Minors until 1929.

His first (and last) major league home run came in 1915, at the age of 18. He is believed to be the youngest major leaguer ever to hit his last home run.

== Personal life ==
Malone was the youngest child of James Richard Malone and his wife, Catherine Cecilia Lewis Malone. His father was born in Maryland of Irish parents and worked as a dairyman as well as a baseball umpire. Malone's mother was born in County Kilkenny, Ireland—the daughter of a tailor, William Paul Lewis, and his wife, Margaret Broderick Lewis. The Lewis family emigrated from Ireland to Baltimore in the early 1860s. Lew Malone grew up on Pennsylvania Avenue in Baltimore where his parents lived until their deaths. Lew's siblings included Esther Malone Albaugh, Clarence "Cy" Malone, William A. Malone, Paul Malone, and James R. Malone. In addition to his career in Major and Minor League baseball, Lew Malone coached university baseball at Long Island University and also worked in wholesale sporting goods.
