= Harry Weaver =

American baseball player (1892–1983)

- Pitcher
- Born: February 26, 1892; Clarendon, Pennsylvania, U.S.
- Died: May 30, 1983 (aged 91); Rochester, New York, U.S.
- Batted: Right Threw: Right

MLB debut
- September 18, 1915, for the Philadelphia Athletics

Last MLB appearance
- May 4, 1919, for the Chicago Cubs

MLB statistics
- Earned run average: 3.64
- Win–loss record: 3-6
- Strikeouts: 21
- Stats at Baseball Reference

Teams
- Philadelphia Athletics (1915–1916); Chicago Cubs (1917–1919)

Harry Abraham Weaver (February 26, 1892 - May 30, 1983) was an American professional baseball player who played pitcher in the Major Leagues from 1915 to 1919. He played for the Chicago Cubs and Philadelphia Athletics. In 1918, Weaver's career was interrupted while he served in World War I.
