= Walter Ancker =

American baseball player (1893–1954)

- Pitcher
- Born: May 10, 1893; New York, New York, U.S.
- Died: February 13, 1954 (aged 60); Englewood, New Jersey, U.S.
- Batted: Right Threw: Right

MLB debut
- September 3, 1915, for the Philadelphia Athletics

Last MLB appearance
- September 14, 1915, for the Philadelphia Athletics

MLB statistics
- Win–loss record: 0–0
- Earned run average: 3.57
- Strikeouts: 4
- Stats at Baseball Reference

Teams
- Philadelphia Athletics (1915)

Walter Ancker (April 10, 1893 – February 13, 1954) was an American professional baseball player who played one season in Major League Baseball (MLB), with the Philadelphia Athletics in 1915.

== Baseball career ==
Ancker pitched at the amateur level for the Tenafly Base Ball Club of Tenafly, New Jersey. In mid-August 1915, he was signed to a professional baseball contract by Connie Mack of the Philadelphia Athletics.

Ancker made his professional debut with the Athletics on September 3, 1915, having gone directly from amateur baseball to the major leagues. In his only major-league season, Ancker had a 0–0 record with a 3.57 earned run average (ERA) in four games (one start).

Ancker did not play in MLB after 1915, but he did played in Minor League Baseball, with the Binghamton Bingoes during 1917 and 1919. Records of the era are incomplete, but he appeared in at least 30 games during 1917 and two games in 1919.

== Personal life ==
Ancker was born on April 10, 1893, in New York City to Edwin and Ancker and Augusta Goetger. After his retirement from professional baseball, Ancker worked on the Board of Chosen Freeholders of Bergen County, New Jersey. He was married to Viola Ancker, who survived him after his death on February 13, 1954.

== See also ==
- List of baseball players who went directly to Major League Baseball
