= Tom Knowlson =

American baseball player

- Pitcher
- Born: April 23, 1895; Ridgway, Pennsylvania, U.S.
- Died: April 11, 1943 (aged 47); Miami Shores, Florida, U.S.
- Batted: Both Threw: Right

MLB debut
- July 3, 1915, for the Philadelphia Athletics

Last MLB appearance
- September 23, 1915, for the Philadelphia Athletics

MLB statistics
- Earned run average: 3.49
- Record: 4-6
- Strikeouts: 24
- Stats at Baseball Reference

Teams
- Philadelphia Athletics (1915)

Thomas Herbert "Doc" Knowlson (April 23, 1895 – April 11, 1943) was an American baseball pitcher for the Philadelphia Athletics in 1915. He was 5 ft 11 in (1.80 m) and weighed 178 pounds.

He made his major league debut on July 3, 1915 at the age of 20. He appeared in 18 games for the Athletics that year, starting half of them, and going 4–6 with a 3.49 ERA. He complete eight of the games he started, and in 100 2/3 innings he had 60 walks and only 24 strikeouts. At the plate, he hit .083 in 36 at-bats. He played his final big league game on September 23.

Following his major league career, Knowlson pitched in the minors for three seasons, 1916, 1917 and 1920. He pitched for the Chattanooga Lookouts and Baltimore Orioles in 1916, going a combined 4–10 in 33 games. In 1917, he pitched for the Lookouts, going 5–10 in 31 games. He pitched for the Augusta Georgians in 1920, going 10–9 with a 2.25 ERA in 20 games. Overall, he went 19–29 in 84 minor league appearances.

Following his death, he was interred at Caballero Rivero Woodlawn Park North Cemetery and Mausoleum in Miami, Florida.
