= Bill Meehan =

American baseball player (1889-1982)

- Pitcher
- Born: September 4, 1889; Osceola Mills, Pennsylvania, U.S.
- Died: October 8, 1982 (aged 93); Douglas, Wyoming, U.S.
- Batted: Right Threw: Right

MLB debut
- September 17, 1915, for the Philadelphia Athletics

Last MLB appearance
- September 17, 1915, for the Philadelphia Athletics

MLB statistics
- Win–loss record: 0-1
- Earned run average: 11.25
- Strikeouts: 4
- Stats at Baseball Reference

Teams
- Philadelphia Athletics (1915)

William Thomas Meehan (September 4, 1889 – October 8, 1982) was an American Major League Baseball (MLB) pitcher. He played for the Philadelphia Athletics during the 1915 season.

A single in his only at-bat left Meehan with a rare MLB career batting average of 1.000.
