= Billy Lee (baseball) =

American baseball player (1894-1984)

- Outfielder
- Born: January 9, 1894; Bayonne, New Jersey, U.S.
- Died: January 6, 1984 (aged 89); West Hazleton, Pennsylvania, U.S.
- Batted: Right Threw: Right

MLB debut
- April 15, 1915, for the St. Louis Browns

Last MLB appearance
- September 30, 1916, for the St. Louis Browns

MLB statistics
- Batting average: .186
- Home runs: 0
- Runs batted in: 4
- Stats at Baseball Reference

Teams
- St. Louis Browns (1915–1916)

William Joseph Lee (January 9, 1894 – January 6, 1984) was an American Major League Baseball outfielder who played for the St. Louis Browns in 1915 and 1916.
