= Bill Dalrymple =

American baseball player (1891-1967)

- Third baseman
- Born: February 7, 1891; Baltimore, Maryland
- Died: July 14, 1967 (aged 76); San Diego
- Batted: Unknown Threw: Right

MLB debut
- July 6, 1915, for the St. Louis Browns

Last MLB appearance
- July 22, 1915, for the St. Louis Browns

MLB statistics
- At bats: 2
- RBI: 0
- Batting average: .000
- Stats at Baseball Reference

Teams
- St. Louis Browns (1915)

William Dunn Dalrymple (February 7, 1891 – July 14, 1967) was an American professional baseball player who played in three games for the St. Louis Browns in 1915. He was born in Baltimore, Maryland and died at the age of 76 in San Diego, California.
