= Dana Fillingim =

American baseball player (1893-1961)

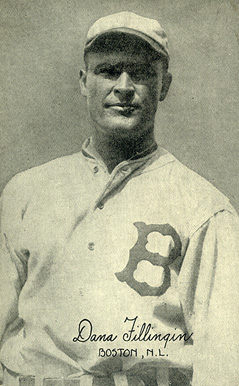
- Pitcher
- Born: November 6, 1893; Columbus, Georgia
- Died: February 3, 1961 (aged 67); Tuskegee, Alabama
- Batted: Left Threw: Right

MLB debut
- August 2, 1915, for the Philadelphia Athletics

Last MLB appearance
- May 12, 1925, for the Philadelphia Phillies

MLB statistics
- Win–loss record: 47–73
- Earned run average: 3.56
- Strikeouts: 270
- Stats at Baseball Reference

Teams
- Philadelphia Athletics (1915); Boston Braves (1918–1923); Philadelphia Phillies (1925)

Dana Fillingim (November 6, 1893 – February 3, 1961) was a pitcher in Major League Baseball. He played for the Philadelphia Athletics, Boston Braves, and Philadelphia Phillies. Fillingim's key pitch was the spitball, and he was one of the pitchers allowed to continue throwing the pitch after it was outlawed in 1921. His best season was in 1921, when he was 15-10 with the Boston Braves.

He was a good hitting pitcher in his 8-year major league career, recording a .209 batting average (77-for-368) with 2 home runs and 26 RBI. Fillingim was a good fielding pitcher in the majors, posting a .983 fielding percentage with only 6 errors in 350 chances, which was 26 points higher than the league average at his position.
