= Rollin Cook =

American baseball player (1890-1975)

- Pitcher
- Born: October 5, 1890; Toledo, Ohio
- Died: August 11, 1975 (aged 84); Toledo, Ohio
- Batted: Right Threw: Right

MLB debut
- July 6, 1915, for the St. Louis Browns

Last MLB appearance
- August 11, 1915, for the St. Louis Browns

MLB statistics
- Win–loss record: 0–0
- Earned run average: 7.24
- Strikeouts: 7

Teams
- St. Louis Browns (1915)

Rollin Edward Cook (October 5, 1890 – August 11, 1975) was a Major League Baseball pitcher who played for the St. Louis Browns in 1915.
