= Eddie Murphy (baseball) =

American baseball player (1891–1969)

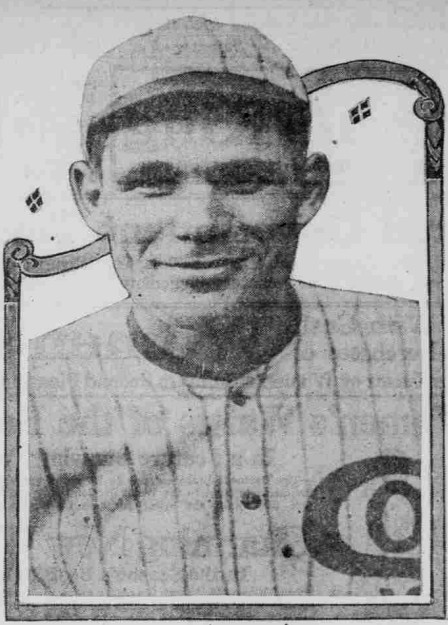
- Right fielder
- Born: October 2, 1891; Hancock, New York, U.S.
- Died: February 21, 1969 (aged 77); Dunmore, Pennsylvania, U.S.
- Batted: Left Threw: Right

MLB debut
- August 26, 1912, for the Philadelphia Athletics

Last MLB appearance
- September 13, 1926, for the Pittsburgh Pirates

MLB statistics
- Batting average: .287
- Home runs: 4
- Runs batted in: 195
- Stats at Baseball Reference

Teams
- Philadelphia Athletics (1912–1915); Chicago White Sox (1915–1921); Pittsburgh Pirates (1926)

Career highlights and awards
- 2× World Series champion (1913, 1917)

John Edward Murphy (October 2, 1891 – February 21, 1969), nicknamed "Honest Eddie", was an American professional baseball right fielder. He played in Major League Baseball for the Philadelphia Athletics, Chicago White Sox and Pittsburgh Pirates.

He appeared in three World Series. His first two were with the Athletics in 1913 and 1914 World Series. Murphy appeared in the 1919 World Series as a member of the Chicago White Sox, a series best known for the Black Sox Scandal. Murphy is also known for having the longest hitting streak to begin a career of any player under 21 years old in MLB history, having started his career with hits in 12 straight games in 1912. Jordan Walker of the St. Louis Cardinals tied this record on April 12, 2023 against the Colorado Rockies.

== Early life ==
Eddie Murphy was born on October 2, 1891, the youngest child of Charles and Theresa Murphy. Charles Murphy was a college educated man which afforded him the ability to stay out of the coal mines of Pennsylvania, which was considered dangerous work. Instead, he worked as a hotel manager which was located near a rail line. The education of his father also helped provide a future for young Eddie that kept him out of the coal mines.

== Professional baseball career ==
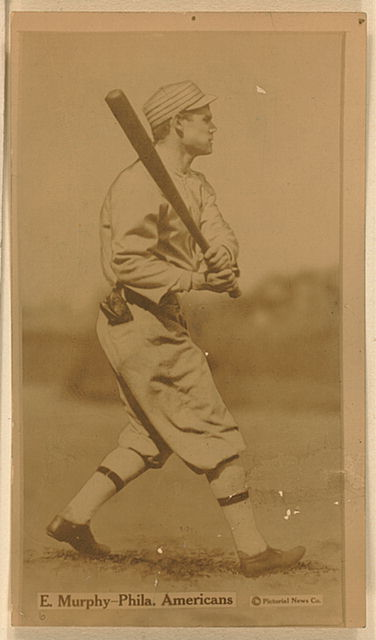
A baseball card featuring Murphy

Murphy began his professional baseball career with the Baltimore Orioles of the Eastern League, later named the International League. On August 24, 1912, the Orioles traded Murphy and Jimmy Walsh to the Philadelphia Athletics for Bris Lord, Claud Derrick, and cash.

Murphy made his professional debut at the age of nineteen for the Scranton Miners of the New York State League in 1911. The team was managed by former MLB star Monte Cross. After getting 97 hits with a .300 batting average, Murphy moved on to the Baltimore Orioles. Before he made his pro debut, Murphy played as a ringer, more or less, for the Honesdale of the semi-pro Anthracite League.

Murphy played in his first major league game on August 26, 1912. During his first season, he posted a batting average of .317 over 33 games, and he had a hit in each of his first 12 games, from August 26 to September 5, setting a record for rookies under 21 that still stands today after more than a century. During the 1913 season, he became a "regular" in the outfield and participated in the A's World Series contest against the New York Giants. In 1915, the Chicago White Sox purchased his contract. Murphy played the remainder of the 1915 and next six seasons for the White Sox.

Murphy was a base stealing threat in the early part of his career, finishing eighth in the American league in 1914 with 36 steals and ninth the following season with 33 stolen bases. He would go on steal 111 bases throughout his career in the majors.

Murphy had played for an A's team that was one of the best in the American League. However, after the underdog Boston Braves upset and swept the A's in the 1914 World Series, an angry Connie Mack sold off or outright released his best players. Murphy was one of the few hold overs on a depleted A's squad. However, his fortunes would change when Philadelphia went to Chicago to face the White Sox, and Murphy was informed by Mack that his contract had just been sold to the White Sox. Murphy was mainly a pinch hitter for most of his time in Chicago. In 1917, Murphy was on his third pennant winning team in five season, but did not appear in the World Series, as White Sox manager Clarence Rowland left Murphy off the play off roster in favor of Shano Collins.

With "Shoeless" Joe Jackson and Happy Felsch called up by the military to build ships in the shipyard, Murphy regained a starting role. The depleted White Sox fell to sixth place and Rowland was fired and replaced by Kid Gleason.

In 1919, Murphy appeared in 30 games and hit for a .486 batting average. That year, the White Sox made the World Series. It was an infamous series, and as a result of the Black Sox Scandal, six members of the White Sox were banned from Major League Baseball; Murphy was not one of those players. Consequently, he was given the nickname "Honest Eddie." Unlike before, Murphy was on the roster and made a few pinch hit appearances.

As the 1920 season rolled along, the White Sox were fighting with the Cleveland Indians and New York Yankees for the pennant. Rumors swirled around that the fix was in for that season just as it had been in the World Series. After seven players were implicated in the fix, Murphy replaced the now suspended Buck Weaver at third base. The suspension took its toll on the White Sox, who quickly fell out of contention. White Sox owner Charles Comiskey issued checks in the amount of $1,500 to the players like Murphy who did not partake in the fix, telling the players they were wronged out of money that should have been theirs under no fault of their own.

The saga of the Black Sox scandal didn't end there for Murphy. In 1926, Murphy was called to testify before the baseball Commissioner Landis. Swede Risberg and Chick Gandil claimed that in 1917, the Detroit Tigers threw a series and that the members of the White Sox paid them to do so. Eddie Collins admitted that a collection was taken up among the players of the White Sox, but it wasn't for the Tigers to throw the series, but it was as a "reward" for the Tigers beating the Red Sox. Murphy testified that he never gave money to the collection and that he had no clue of the reward money being collected. After a brief investigation, Landis cleared Murphy and the other white Sox players and dismissed the claims of Risberg and Gandil.

On June 1, 1921 the Cleveland Indians placed a waiver claim on Murphy and purchased his contract from the White Sox. From 1921 until 1925, Murphy played for the Columbus Senators of the International league. Through his stint with Columbus, Murphy continued to be an excellent hitter, hitting .397 in 1925 at the age of 33, which won him the league's batting title. In 1927, he played for the Rochester Tribe (who would later go on to be called the Rochester Red Wings), playing for manager George Stallings and alongside former MLB star Rabbit Maranville. At the age of 35, Murphy appeared in 83 games for the Tribe, again batting over three hundred, batting .341 for the season.

Murphy ended his MLB career with the Pittsburgh Pirates in 1926. In 11 years, he had 680 hits, scored 411 runs with 111 stolen bases, and a .287 lifetime batting average with four home runs and 195 RBI. In his final major league game, Murphy only had one at bat. Giants pitcher Jimmy Ring got Murphy to hit into a double play in the Pirates 9–5 loss to New York.

After his brief return to the majors, Murphy split the 1927 season between the Montreal Royals and Jersey City Skeeters before he retired for good.

== Post-MLB career ==
After retiring, Murphy relocated with his wife, son, and daughter to Dunmore, Pennsylvania. He managed the local semi-pro team and later worked as a supervisor with the Works Progress Administration and helped arrange exhibitions for visiting troops during World War II. Murphy died on February 21, 1969, at the age of 77. He was buried at Queen of Peace Cemetery in Hawley, Pennsylvania.
