= Pete Johns =

American baseball player (1888–1964)

- Infielder
- Born: January 17, 1888; Cleveland, Ohio, U.S.
- Died: August 9, 1964 (aged 76); Cleveland, Ohio, U.S.
- Batted: Right Threw: Right

MLB debut
- August 25, 1915, for the Chicago White Sox

Last MLB appearance
- September 1, 1918, for the St. Louis Browns

MLB statistics
- Batting average: .196
- Home runs: 0
- Runs batted in: 22
- Stats at Baseball Reference

Teams
- Chicago White Sox (1915); St. Louis Browns (1918)

William R. "Pete" Johns (January 17, 1888 – August 9, 1964) was an American infielder in Major League Baseball. He played for the Chicago White Sox and St. Louis Browns.

Johns died on August 9, 1964, and was buried at Knollwood Cemetery in Mayfield Heights, Ohio.

== Bibliography ==
- Lee, Bill (2009). The Baseball Necrology: The Post-Baseball Lives and Deaths of Over 7,600 Major League Players and Others. Jefferson, N.C.: McFarland & Co. ISBN 9780786442393.
