= Bob Cone =

American baseball player (1894-1955)

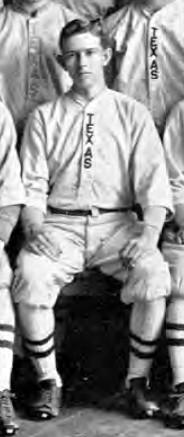
- Pitcher
- Born: February 27, 1894; Galveston, Texas
- Died: May 24, 1955 (aged 61); Galveston, Texas
- Batted: Right Threw: Right

MLB debut
- July 25, 1915, for the Philadelphia Athletics

Last MLB appearance
- July 25, 1915, for the Philadelphia Athletics

MLB statistics
- Win–loss record: 0–0
- Earned run average: 40.50
- Strikeouts: 0
- Stats at Baseball Reference

Teams
- Philadelphia Athletics (1915)

Robert Earl Cone (February 27, 1894 – May 24, 1955) was an American Major League Baseball pitcher and one of the early urologists in Texas.

== Biography ==
Cone was born in Galveston, Texas, where he attended Ball High School. He played baseball at the University of Texas at Austin from 1912 to 1915. He played for the Philadelphia Athletics during the 1915 season.

After his baseball career, Cone attended medical school, graduating from the University of Texas Medical Branch (UTMB) in 1919. He became a urologist affiliated with the same institution, establishing urology as a distinct surgical specialty at UTMB and remaining the urology chief until his death. The Texas Urological Society was formed at Cone's home in Galveston.

Cone married Mallie Parten in 1926. The couple had two children. Cone died in 1955.
