= Shorty Dee =

Canadian baseball player

- Shortstop
- Born: October 4, 1889; Halifax, Nova Scotia, Canada
- Died: August 12, 1971 (aged 81); Jamaica Plain, Massachusetts, U.S.
- Batted: Right Threw: Right

MLB debut
- September 14, 1915, for the St. Louis Browns

Last MLB appearance
- September 14, 1915, for the St. Louis Browns

MLB statistics
- Batting average: .000
- Home runs: 0
- Runs batted in: 0
- Stats at Baseball Reference

Teams
- St. Louis Browns (1915)

Maurice Leo (Shorty) Dee (October 4, 1889 – August 12, 1971) was a Canadian right-handed Major League Baseball shortstop. He played one game for the St. Louis Browns in the 1915 season. He had no hits in three at-bats, with one walk and a run scored.
