= Tom Phillips (baseball) =

American baseball player (1889–1929)

- Pitcher
- Born: April 5, 1889; Philipsburg, Pennsylvania
- Died: April 12, 1929 (aged 40); Philipsburg, Pennsylvania
- Batted: Right Threw: Right

MLB debut
- September 13, 1915, for the St. Louis Browns

Last MLB appearance
- July 10, 1922, for the Washington Senators

MLB statistics
- Win–loss record: 8–12
- Earned run average: 3.74
- Strikeouts: 44
- Stats at Baseball Reference

Teams
- St. Louis Browns (1915); Cleveland Indians (1919); Washington Senators (1921–1922)

Thomas Gerard Phillips (April 5, 1889 – April 12, 1929) was a Major League Baseball pitcher who played for four seasons. He played for the St. Louis Browns in 1915, the Cleveland Indians in 1919, and the Washington Senators from 1921 to 1922. In 1922, Tom Phillips played baseball in the American Association for the Minneapolis Millers. Manager Joe Cantillon led the Millers to a record of 92-75 to earn Second Place. Phillips's stats for 1922 are: 21 Games Played; 143 Innings Pitched; 9 Games Won; 7 Games Lost; and his Earned Run Average was 4.47.

In 1923, again with Manager Joe Cantillon, the Millers's record was 74-92 to earn Sixth Place. Phillips's stats are: 12 Games Played; 74 Innings Pitched; 4 Games Won; 4 Games Lost; and his Earned Run Average was 5.06. That year, Phillips hit 4 Home Runs and his RBI was 5.06. (Stats from Stew Thornley, author of On to Nicollett: The Glory and Fame of the Minneapolis Millers.) .

Phillips was well over six-feet tall, hence the nickname "Big Tom Phillips." The family considers him a hero as he was the first to make it "out of the mines." Although he never married, several relatives have been named "Thomas" in his honor.

According to an April 12, 1929 newspaper obituary clipping found on the back of a family portrait: "He broke into professional baseball with Wilkes-Barre in 1914, where his work attracted Connie Mack. During his best years he was a member of the [Philadelphia] Athletics, St. Louis [Browns], Cleveland [Indians] and Washington [Senators] in the American League. He was also with Little Rock and New Orleans of the Southern Association, pitching the latter team to a pennant in 1924. In 1925 Washington sent him to Minneapolis. The Millers recently sent him to Des Moines, in the Western Association, while he was ill at home in Philipsburg, Pennsylvania. He was about 38 years of age, and had lived here nearly all of his life. His best feat was a no-hit, no-run game while with New Orleans in 1924.

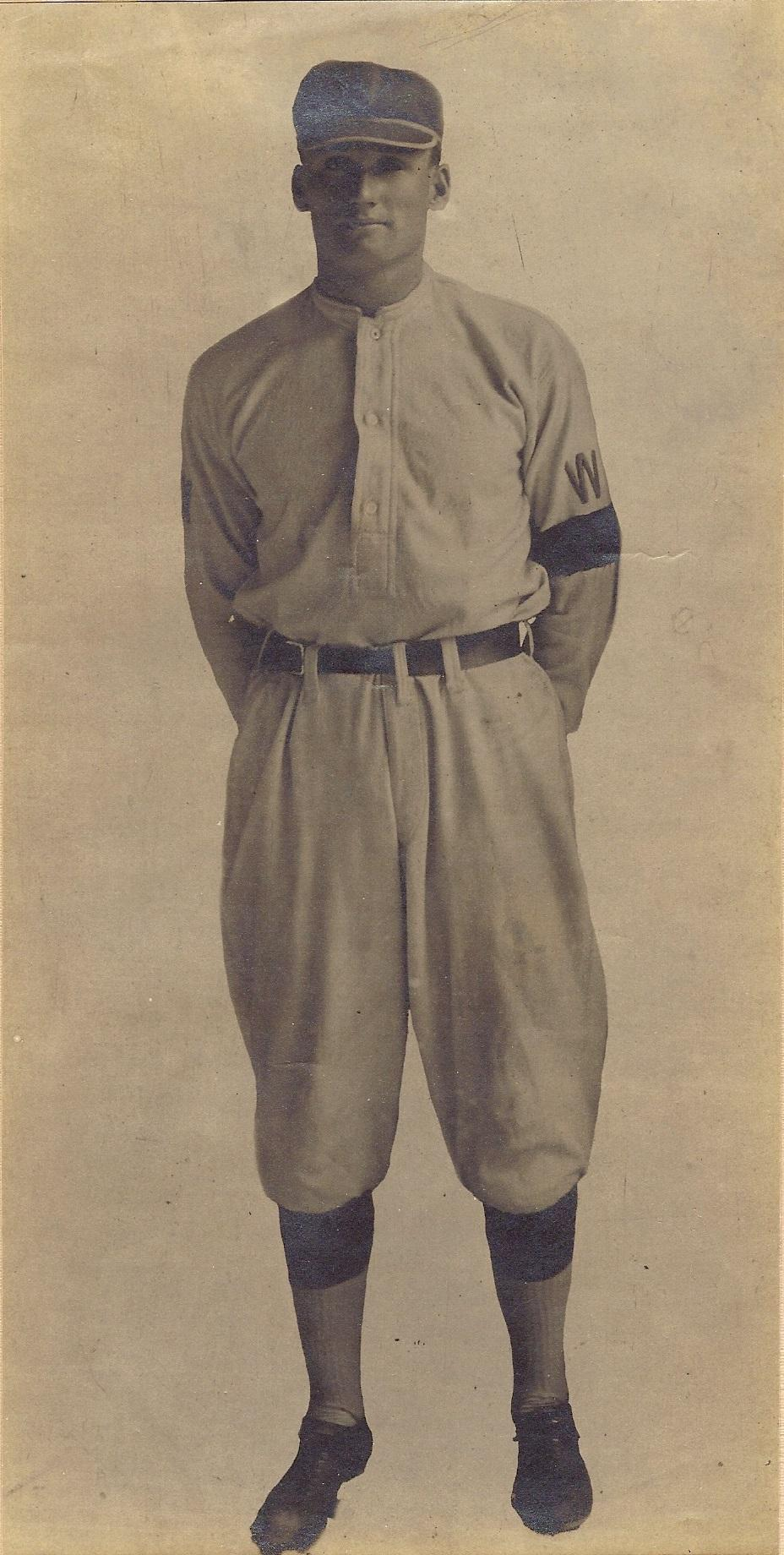
Phillips in his Washington uniform

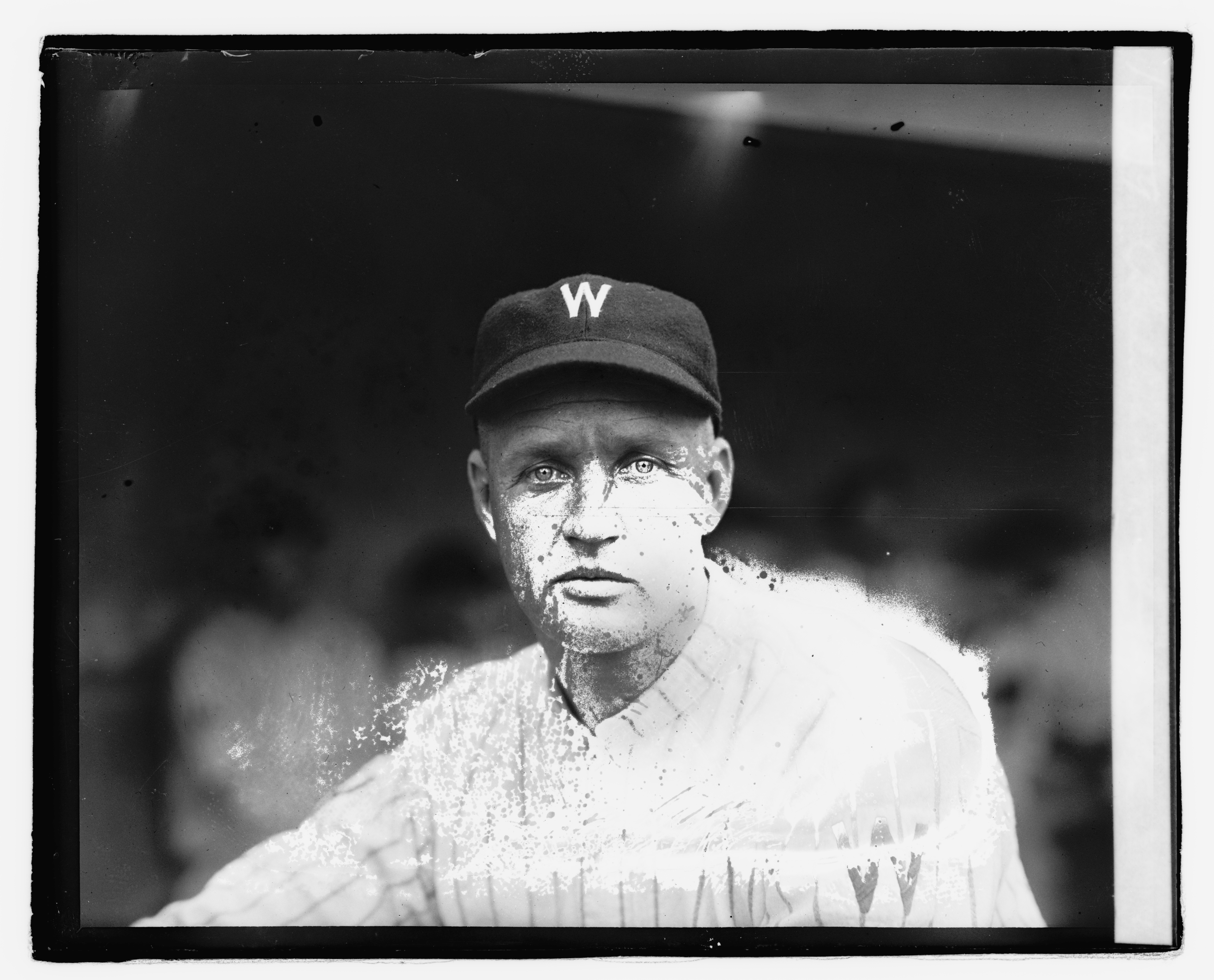
Tom Phillips, 1921

"Tom Phillips, former big league pitcher, died at the Philipsburg state hospital here today after a lingering illness from diabetes. He had recently returned from Hot Springs, where he had spent the winter in hopes of regaining his health."
