= Buck Danner =

American baseball player (1891-1949)

- Shortstop
- Born: June 8, 1891; Dedham, Massachusetts, U.S.
- Died: September 21, 1949 (aged 58); Boston, Massachusetts, U.S.
- Batted: Right Threw: Right

MLB debut
- September 17, 1915, for the Philadelphia Athletics

Last MLB appearance
- September 24, 1915, for the Philadelphia Athletics

MLB statistics
- Batting average: .250
- Home runs: 0
- Runs batted in: 0
- Stats at Baseball Reference

Teams
- Philadelphia Athletics (1915)

Henry Frederick "Buck" Danner (June 8, 1891 – September 21, 1949) was an American Major League Baseball infielder. He played for the Philadelphia Athletics during the 1915 season.

Danner was playing for an independent team in Rumford, Maine in September 1915 when he was scouted and signed by Harry Davis of the Athletics. After a brief trial in the majors, Connie Mack attempted to farm him out to a minor league club in Michigan for the 1916 season but, due to illness in his family, he chose to return to New England where he played for amateur teams.
