= Squiz Pillion =

American baseball player

- Pitcher
- Born: April 13, 1894; Hartford, Connecticut
- Died: September 30, 1962 (aged 68); Pittsburgh, Pennsylvania
- Batted: Left Threw: Left

MLB debut
- August 20, 1915, for the Philadelphia Athletics

Last MLB appearance
- August 26, 1915, for the Philadelphia Athletics

MLB statistics
- Win–loss record: 0–0
- Strikeouts: 0
- Earned run average: 6.75
- Stats at Baseball Reference

Teams
- Philadelphia Athletics (1915)

Cecil Randolph "Squiz" Pillion (April 13, 1894 – September 30, 1962) was a Major League Baseball pitcher. He appeared in two games over the course of one week in 1915 for the Philadelphia Athletics.

== Sources ==
- Career statistics from Baseball Reference, or Baseball Reference (Minors)
