= Harry Damrau =

American baseball player (1890-1957)

- Third baseman
- Born: September 11, 1890; Newburgh, New York, U.S.
- Died: August 21, 1957 (aged 66); Staten Island, New York, U.S.
- Batted: Right Threw: Right

MLB debut
- September 17, 1915, for the Philadelphia Athletics

Last MLB appearance
- October 6, 1915, for the Philadelphia Athletics

MLB statistics
- Games played: 16
- Batting average: .196
- Runs batted in: 3
- Stats at Baseball Reference

Teams
- Philadelphia Athletics (1915)

Harry Robert Damrau (September 11, 1890 – August 21, 1957) was an American Major League Baseball third baseman. He played for the Philadelphia Athletics during the 1915 season.
