= Pants Rowland =

American baseball manager

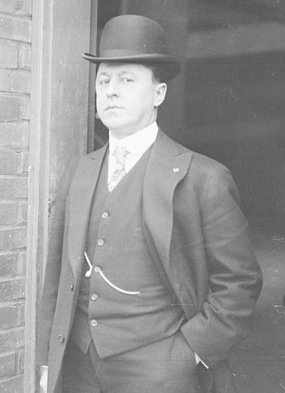
- Pants Rowland in 1915
- Manager
- Born: February 12, 1878; Platteville, Wisconsin, U.S.
- Died: May 17, 1969 (aged 91); Chicago, Illinois, U.S.
- Batted: Unknown Threw: Unknown

MLB statistics
- Games managed: 590
- Managerial record: 339–247
- Winning percentage: .578

Teams
- Chicago White Sox (1915–1918)

Career highlights and awards
- World Series champion (1917)

Clarence Henry "Pants" Rowland (February 12, 1878 – May 17, 1969) was an American Major League Baseball manager for the Chicago White Sox from 1915 through 1918 who went on to become a major figure in minor league baseball. He was born in Platteville, Wisconsin. In his varied career that spanned parts of six decades, he was a catcher, scout, major league umpire, minor and major league manager, and a boisterous baseball executive.

== Career ==
He started in baseball at age nine, where he earned his nickname, "Pants", from base-running antics while wearing his father's workday overalls at games of the Dubuque (Iowa) Ninth Street Blues.

Rowland served as a reserve catcher in the minor leagues. To find extra cash, he looked for other occupations.

Pants worked as a scout in the Illinois–Indiana–Iowa League—the so-called "Three-I" League—for the Dubuque Miners. He worked his way into a managerial job, which proved to be his early calling.

He then became the manager of the Three-I League Peoria Distillers in 1914. After the 1914 season, on December 17, Charles Comiskey, possibly as much for his legendary cheapness as for Rowland's talent, surprised White Sox fans and Chicago journalists when he called on Rowland to manage the White Sox.

In his first year, Rowland and the White Sox finished 93-61, third in the American League; the next year, he finished second. In 1917, he led them to a 100-54 record and a World Series title when they beat the New York Giants. Disagreements with Comiskey got him fired the following season, which, given the state of affairs on the White Sox leading up to the Black Sox Scandal, probably saved his reputation.

Rowland's all-time record was 339-247 in 591 games, a .591 winning percentage. Kid Gleason succeeded Rowland as the next manager of the White Sox.

Rowland served as an American League umpire for five years (1923-1927), calling games with the likes of Babe Ruth.

In 1938, as a scout for the Chicago Cubs, he was tasked with the unenviable job of obeying owner Phil Wrigley's orders to obtain Dizzy Dean's contract at any cost. Dean was acquired in a blockbuster trade with the St. Louis Cardinals on April 16, 1938 for three players and $185,000. However, the sore-armed, 28-year-old right-hander only was able to win 19 games (losing ten) in 39 appearances over 3+ seasons in Chicago.

Rowland returned to the front office during World War II. He was the president of the Los Angeles Angels in 1944, where he earned The Sporting News' title of No. 1 minor-league executive.

It was as president of the Pacific Coast League where Rowland came to new prominence.

"Pacific Coast baseball men are fed up with playing Santa Claus to the major leagues", said a TIME magazine article in December 1944, "...They do not like losing their Buck Newsomes, Joe Di Maggios and Ted Williamses. They think postwar air travel may well lure some big league club to pick up a Los Angeles franchise (the St. Louis Browns nibbled at it two years ago). Above all, they await the day when they can support a third big league of their own."

Rowland was the cheerleader for the PCL battle cry of independence. Air travel was still primitive, and the PCL teams had near major-league standing in the rapidly growing cities of the Western United States. He took on major league baseball commissioners Kenesaw Mountain Landis and Happy Chandler, trying to free the league from losing players to the American and National League for a minuscule $7,500 buyout of their contract.

He went to the 1944 winter meetings of the NABPL (National Association of Professional Baseball Leagues) in Buffalo with a two-plank agenda. He proposed that minor leagues get $10,000 (a compromise figure) instead of $7,500 when one of their players is drafted by a major-league club. He also suggested that if & when the major leagues invade minor-league territory, the incumbent minor-league owners should get first crack at the major franchise.

To his surprise, Rowland won support for both of his proposals. Landis opposed the PCL proposal and threatened to "outlaw" the league if it tried to move up in the world. The former judge, who had been brought in by the owners of baseball to clean up the mess from the 1919 Chicago scandal, held anyone connected with the organization at that time in particularly low esteem. Rowland's ties to the last season of pre-Black Sox ball tarred him with the same brush in the eyes of the man called the "baseball tyrant."

Rowland tried his hand at establishing the PCL as a major league after Chandler had succeeded Landis. Chandler and his fact-finding team, which included National League and American League presidents Ford Frick and Will Harridge, begged off again.

At a meeting in September 1951 in San Francisco, California, Rowland led the charge of the club owners, who voted to serve an ultimatum on the majors. If they did not receive an exemption from the player draft, the PCL would declare itself the third major league, operating as an "outlaw" league.

"We're all living or dying together in this deal, and if the majors won't go along, to hell with 'em", said C. L. "Brick" Laws, owner of the Oakland team in a TIME Magazine story on the PCL.

Without the blessings of major league baseball, and with the implied threat they could come into the PCL at any time with one of their clubs, or an expansion club, Rowland was not able to secure the backing for any of his teams which would bring both facilities and teams up to major league standards.

Rowland stepped down as PCL president at the close of the 1954 seasons after 11 seasons in office. He then returned to the Cubs as a vice president and was VP emeritus of the club at the time of his death at age 91.

== Managerial record ==
Team	Year	Regular season					Postseason			
Team	Year	Games	Won	Lost	Win %	Finish	Won	Lost	Win %	Result
CWS	1915	154	93	61	.604	3rd in AL	–	–	–	–
CWS	1916	154	89	65	.578	2nd in AL	–	–	–	–
CWS	1917	154	100	54	.649	1st in AL	4	2	.667	Won World Series (NYG)
CWS	1918	124	57	67	.460	6th in AL	–	–	–	–
Total		586	339	247	.578		4	2	.667	

== Death ==
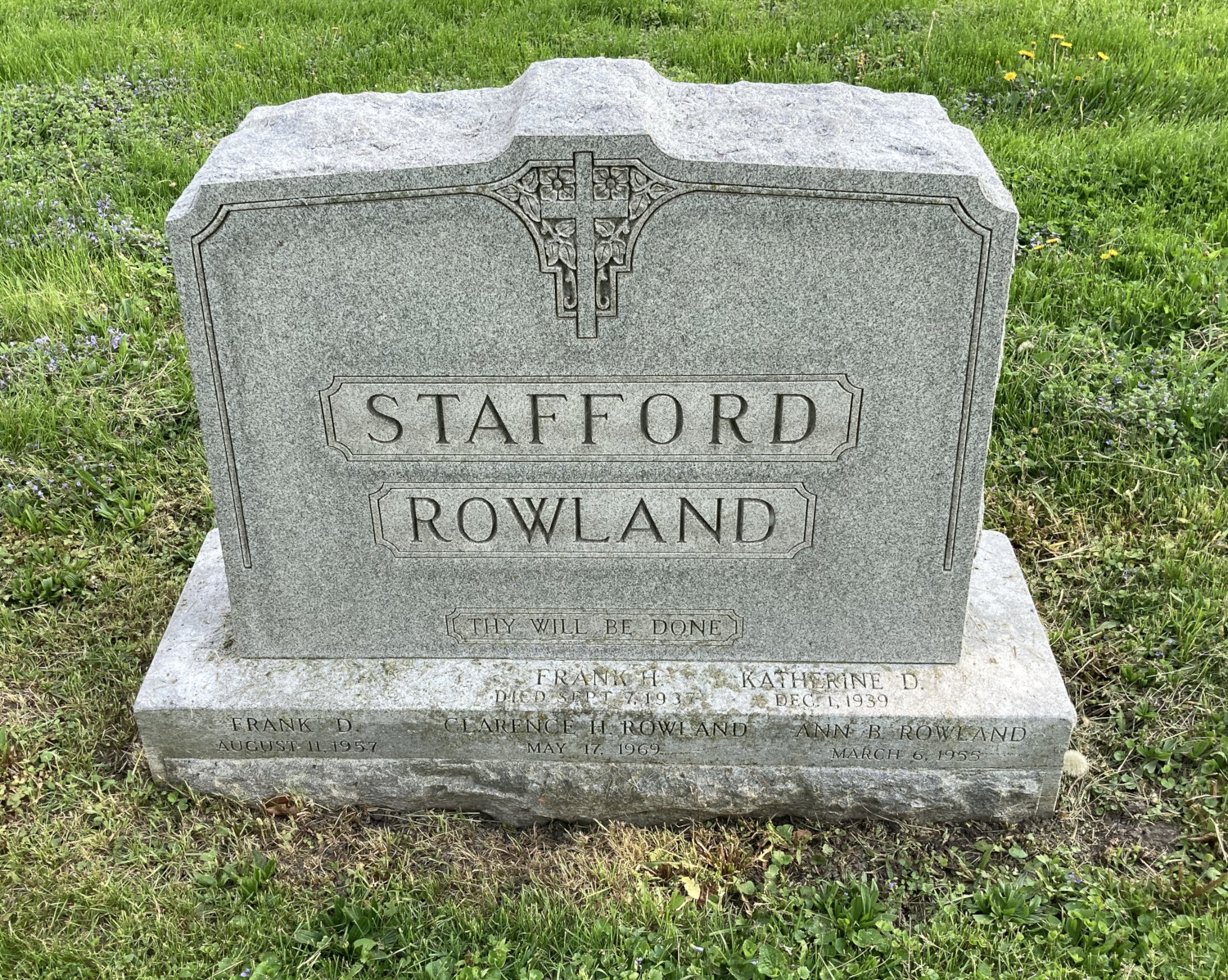
Rowland's grave at Holy Sepulchre Cemetery

Rowland died in Chicago, the hometown of the team he managed. He is interred in Holy Sepulchre Cemetery in Alsip, Illinois.

== Legacy ==
Rowland was a 1964 inductee in the Wisconsin Athletic Hall of Fame. He was posthumously inducted into the Pacific Coast League Hall of Fame in 2005.
