= Chick Davies =

American baseball player (1892–1973)

- Pitcher / Outfielder
- Born: March 6, 1892; Peabody, Massachusetts, U.S.
- Died: September 5, 1973 (aged 81); Middletown, Connecticut, U.S.
- Batted: Left Threw: Left

MLB debut
- July 11, 1914, for the Philadelphia Athletics

Last MLB appearance
- September 23, 1926, for the New York Giants

MLB statistics
- Win–loss record: 4-6
- Earned run average: 4.48
- Batting average: .193
- Stats at Baseball Reference

Teams
- Philadelphia Athletics (1914–1915); New York Giants (1925–1926)

Career highlights and awards
- Led NL in saves and games finished, 1926

Lloyd Garrison "Chick" Davies (March 6, 1892 – September 5, 1973) was an American professional baseball player who played for the Philadelphia Athletics (1914–1915) and the New York Giants (1925–1926) as a pitcher and outfielder. He led the National League in saves (6) and games finished (29) in 1926. Davies was an alumnus of the University of Massachusetts Amherst. He died September 5, 1973, in Middletown, Connecticut.

== See also ==
- List of Major League Baseball annual saves leaders
