= Pete Sims (baseball) =

American baseball player (1891-1968)

- Pitcher
- Born: May 24, 1891; Crown City, Ohio, U.S.
- Died: December 2, 1968 (aged 77); Dallas, Texas, U.S.
- Batted: Right Threw: Right

MLB debut
- September 16, 1915, for the St. Louis Browns

Last MLB appearance
- September 23, 1915, for the St. Louis Browns

MLB statistics
- Win–loss record: 1-0
- Earned run average: 4.32
- Strikeouts: 4
- Stats at Baseball Reference

Teams
- St. Louis Browns (1915)

Clarence "Pete" Sims (May 24, 1891 – December 2, 1968) was an American Major League Baseball pitcher who played for the St. Louis Browns in 1915.

A single in his only at-bat left Sims with a rare MLB career batting average of 1.000.
