= Cap Crowell =

American baseball player (1892-1962)

- Pitcher
- Born: September 5, 1892; Roxbury, Massachusetts, U.S.
- Died: September 30, 1962 (aged 70); Central Falls, Rhode Island, U.S.
- Batted: Right Threw: Right

MLB debut
- June 23, 1915, for the Philadelphia Athletics

Last MLB appearance
- June 10, 1916, for the Philadelphia Athletics

MLB statistics
- Win–loss record: 2–11
- Earned run average: 5.27
- Strikeouts: 30
- Stats at Baseball Reference

Teams
- Philadelphia Athletics (1915–1916)

Minot Joy "Cap" Crowell (September 5, 1892 – September 30, 1962) was an American Major League Baseball pitcher. He played for the Philadelphia Athletics during the 1915 and 1916 seasons. He attended Brown University.
