= Tink Turner =

American baseball player

- Pitcher
- Born: February 20, 1890; Swarthmore, Pennsylvania, U.S.
- Died: February 25, 1962 (aged 72); Philadelphia, Pennsylvania, U.S.
- Batted: Right Threw: Right

MLB debut
- September 24, 1915, for the Philadelphia Athletics

Last MLB appearance
- September 24, 1915, for the Philadelphia Athletics

MLB statistics
- Win–loss record: 0–1
- Strikeouts: 0
- Earned run average: 22.50
- Stats at Baseball Reference

Teams
- Philadelphia Athletics (1915)

Thomas Lovatt "Tink" Turner (February 20, 1890 – February 25, 1962) was an American Major League Baseball pitcher. He started one game for the Philadelphia Athletics in September 1915. In that game, Turner lasted just two innings, giving up 6 runs on five hits while taking the loss against the Chicago White Sox. After his playing career ended, Turner worked for the Athletics as a scout.

== See also ==
- List of St. Louis Cardinals coaches

== Sources ==
- Career statistics from Baseball Reference · Baseball Reference (Minors) · Retrosheet · Baseball Almanac
